= Monaco in the Eurovision Song Contest 1967 =

- Eurovision Song Contest 1967
- Participating broadcaster: Télé Monte-Carlo (TMC)
- Country: Monaco
- Selection process: Artist: Internal selection Song: National final

Competing entry
- Song: "Boum-Badaboum"
- Artist: Minouche Barelli
- Songwriters: Serge Gainsbourg

Placement
- Final result: 5th, 10 points

Participation chronology

Monaco was represented at the Eurovision Song Contest 1967 with the song "Boum-Badaboum", written by Serge Gainsbourg, and performed by Minouche Barelli. The Monégasque participating broadcaster, Télé Monte-Carlo (TMC), chose its entry through a public voting, after having previously selected the performer internally.

== Before Eurovision ==
=== Selection ===
According to a report, 19-year-old Minouche Barelli, a CBS singer, had already been chosen by TMC to represent Monaco by 25 February 1967. It was then announced that the artist would perform seven proposed songs, one each night, on television that same month, allowing viewers to determine the winner. This means that the selection process was open. "Boum-Badaboum" by Serge Gainsbourg was revealed as Monaco's official entry, first mentioned on at least 23 March. Media outlets called it atypical for the contest, which they considered a "temple of conformist songs", and compared it to the work of Bob Dylan.

Barelli herself had close ties to Monaco before competing in Eurovision, having sung in the orchestra of Aimé Barelli, her father who was well-known in France, in Monte Carlo.

=== Promotion ===
As part of the promotion of her participation in the contest, Barelli performed "Boum-Badaboum" on Claude Robert's show Rendez-vous à Luxembourg in Luxembourg City, Luxembourg, on Télé-Luxembourg on 31 March 1967. Entrants from France, Luxembourg, and Switzerland also appeared during the programme with their entries.

== At Eurovision ==
The Eurovision Song Contest 1967 took place on 8 April 1967 at the Großer Festsaal der Wiener Hofburg in Vienna, Austria.

Following a draw to determine the running order of the show, which was published earlier in March, Monaco was set to perform in position 14, after Norway and before Yugoslavia.

During Barelli's performance, the orchestra was conducted by her father. Eventually, Monaco finished fifth with 10 points.

=== Voting ===
Below is a breakdown of points awarded to and by Monaco in the final. The contest voting involved a ten-member jury from each country, each of whom could give one vote to their favourite song.

Points awarded to Monaco
Score	Country
5 points	Spain
2 points	Austria
1 point	France; Italy; Sweden

Points awarded by Monaco
Score	Country
3 points	United Kingdom
2 points	France; Ireland; Spain
1 point	Germany
