= Eurovision Song Contest 1967 =

International song competition

Date and venue
- Final: 8 April 1967
- Venue: Großer Festsaal der Wiener Hofburg; Vienna, Austria

Organisation
- Organiser: European Broadcasting Union (EBU)
- Scrutineer: Clifford Brown

Production
- Host broadcaster: Österreichischer Rundfunk (ORF)
- Director: Herbert Fuchs
- Executive producer: Karl Lackner
- Musical director: Johannes Fehring
- Presenter: Erica Vaal

Participants
- Number of entries: 17
- Non-returning countries: Denmark
- Participation map: Competing countries Countries that participated in the past but not in 1967

Vote
- Voting system: Ten-member juries in each country; each member gave one vote to their favourite song
- Winning song: United Kingdom "Puppet on a String"

The Eurovision Song Contest 1967 was the 12th edition of the Eurovision Song Contest, held on 8 April 1967 at the Großer Festsaal der Wiener Hofburg in Vienna, Austria, and presented by Erica Vaal. It was organised by the European Broadcasting Union (EBU) and host broadcaster Österreichischer Rundfunk (ORF), who staged the event after winning the 1966 contest for Austria with the song "Merci, Chérie" by Udo Jürgens. It was the first contest held in the month of April.

Broadcasters from seventeen countries participated in the contest, one fewer than the record eighteen that had competed in the 1965 and 1966 editions. Denmark decided not to enter and left the contest at this point, not returning until 1978.

The winner was the United Kingdom with the song "Puppet on a String", written and composed by Bill Martin and Phil Coulter, and performed by Sandie Shaw. This was the first British win and the entry had one of the widest margins of victory ever witnessed in the competition; it garnered more than twice as many votes as the runner up. Ireland, France, Luxembourg and Monaco rounded out the top five, with Ireland achieving their best result to date.

This was the last contest to be produced in black and white as it would begin to be produced in colour from the 1968 edition onwards.

== Location ==
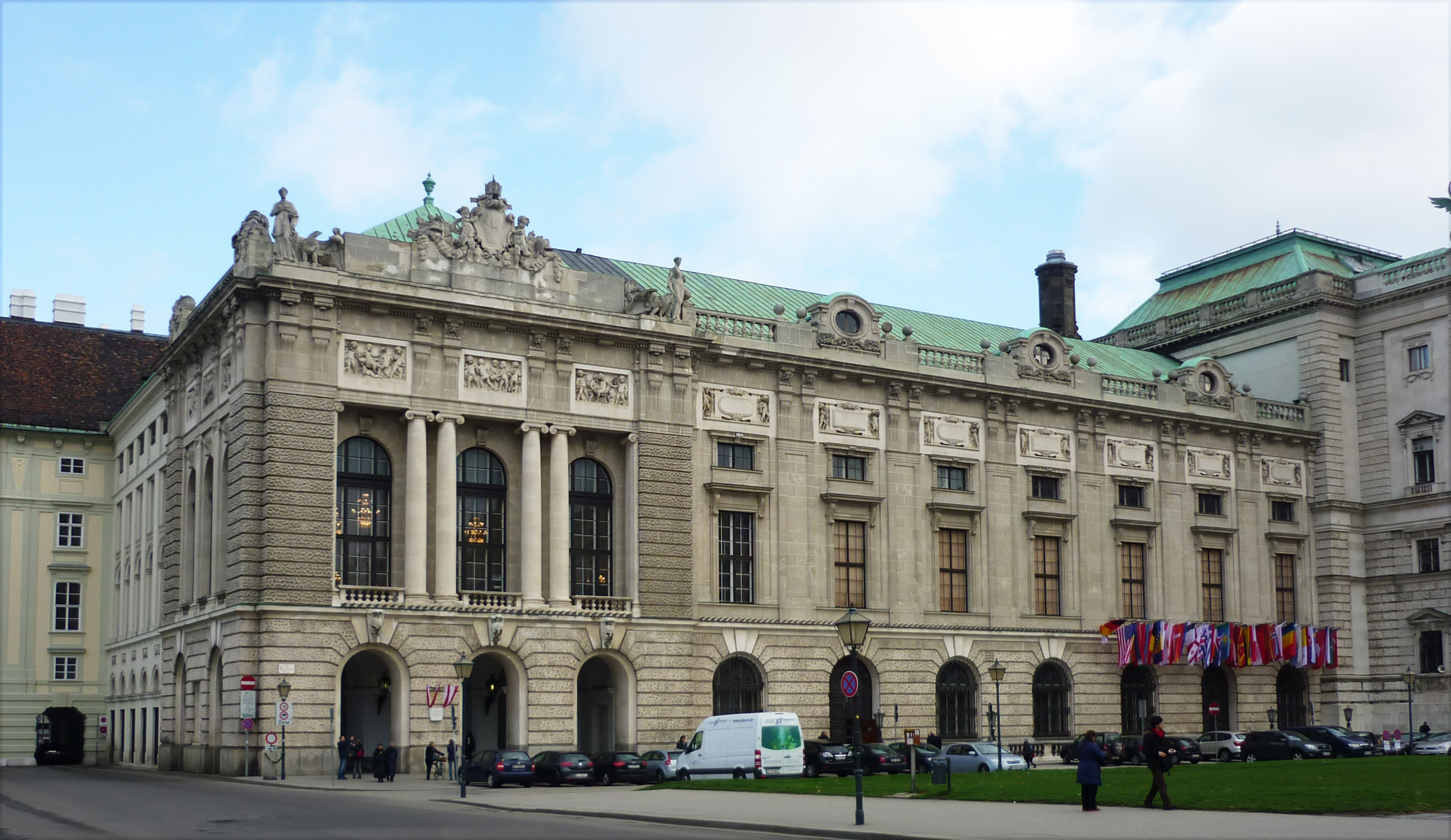
Großer Festsaal der Wiener Hofburg, Vienna – host venue of the 1967 contest

Österreichischer Rundfunk (ORF) staged the 1967 contest in Vienna, after winning the 1966 contest for Austria with the song "Merci, Chérie" by Udo Jürgens. The venue selected was the Festival Hall of the Hofburg Palace. With its 1,000 m^{2} (11,000 sq ft) of floor space, the Festival Hall is the largest room in the entire palace complex and was originally built as a throne room, but was never used as such. The Hofburg Palace was the principal winter residence of the Habsburg dynasty, rulers of the Austro-Hungarian empire, and it currently serves as the official residence of the President of Austria.

At early stages of production, the Ronacher was considered as venue for the 1967 contest.

== Participants ==
Eurovision Song Contest 1967 – Participation summaries by country
- Austria; Belgium; Finland; France; Germany; Ireland; Italy; Luxembourg; Monaco; Netherlands; Norway; Portugal; Spain; Sweden; Switzerland; United Kingdom; Yugoslavia

Broadcasters from seventeen countries participated in the 1967 contest. Of the eighteen countries that participated in 1966 only Denmark was absent. Danmarks Radio (DR) chose not to participate this year and left the contest at this point, not to be returning again until 1978. The reason was that the new director of the television entertainment department thought that the money could be spent in a better way.

The contest featured three representatives who had previously performed as lead artists for the same country. Claudio Villa had represented Italy in 1962, Kirsti Sparboe had represented Norway in 1965, and Raphael had represented Spain in 1966.

Despite being a popular winning song for the United Kingdom, singer Sandie Shaw intensely disliked the composition, though her attitude towards the song somewhat mellowed in later years, even releasing a new version in 2007.

The entry from Luxembourg, "L'amour est bleu", sung by Vicky Leandros, came in fourth; nonetheless, it went on to become one of the biggest hits of the 1967 contest, and a year later would be a big instrumental hit for French musician, Paul Mauriat, under the English title, "Love Is Blue". Portugal was represented by Eduardo Nascimento, who was the first black male singer in the history of the contest. After winning the Sanremo Music Festival 1967, Italian participant Claudio Villa was due to perform the song "Non pensare a me", but it was disqualified due to being commercially released before the deadline set by the EBU, and was replaced with "Non andare più lontano".

Eurovision Song Contest 1967 participants
Country	Broadcaster	Artist	Song	Language	Songwriter(s)	Conductor
Austria	ORF	Peter Horton	"Warum es hunderttausend Sterne gibt"	German	Karin Bognar; Kurt Peche	Johannes Fehring
Belgium	BRT	Louis Neefs	"Ik heb zorgen"	Dutch	Paul Quintens; Phil Van Cauwenbergh	Francis Bay
Finland	YLE	Fredi	"Varjoon – suojaan"	Finnish	Lasse Mårtenson; Alvi Vuorinen	Ossi Runne
France	ORTF	Noëlle Cordier	"Il doit faire beau là-bas"	French	Pierre Delanoë; Hubert Giraud	Franck Pourcel
Germany	HR (Note: On behalf of the German public broadcasting consortium ARD)	Inge Brück	"Anouschka"	German	Hans Blum	Hans Blum
Ireland	RTÉ	Sean Dunphy	"If I Could Choose"	English	Wesley Burrowes; Michael Coffey	Noel Kelehan
Italy	RAI	Claudio Villa	"Non andare più lontano"	Italian	Gino Mescoli; Vito Pallavicini	Giancarlo Chiaramello
Luxembourg	CLT	Vicky	"L'amour est bleu"	French	Pierre Cour; André Popp	Claude Denjean
Monaco	TMC	Minouche Barelli	"Boum-Badaboum"	French	Michel Colombier; Serge Gainsbourg	Aimé Barelli
Netherlands	NTS	Thérèse Steinmetz	"Ringe-dinge"	Dutch	Gerrit den Braber; Johnny Holshuysen	Dolf van der Linden
Norway	NRK	Kirsti Sparboe	"Dukkemann"	Norwegian	Tor Hultin; Ola B. Johannessen	Øivind Bergh
Portugal	RTP	Eduardo Nascimento	"O vento mudou"	Portuguese	Nuno Nazareth Fernandes; João Magalhães Pereira	Tavares Belo
Spain	TVE	Raphael	"Hablemos del amor"	Spanish	Manuel Alejandro	Manuel Alejandro
Sweden	SR	Östen Warnerbring	"Som en dröm"	Swedish	Patrice Hellberg; Marcus Österdahl; Curt Peterson	Mats Olsson
Switzerland	SRG SSR	Géraldine	"Quel cœur vas-tu briser ?"	French	Daniël Faure; Gérard Gray	Hans Moeckel
United Kingdom	BBC	Sandie Shaw	"Puppet on a String"	English	Phil Coulter; Bill Martin	Kenny Woodman
Yugoslavia	JRT	Lado Leskovar	"Vse rože sveta"	Slovene	Urban Koder; Milan Lindič	Mario Rijavec

== Format ==
Following the confirmation of the seventeen competing countries, the draw to determine the running order of the contest was held on 21 March 1967.

The stage setup was a little unusual this year. There was a staircase in the middle of the stage as well as two revolving mirrored walls on both ends of the stage; they began revolving at the start of each song, and stopped at its end. A change in rule also required half of every nation's jury to be less than 30 years old.

The presenter Erica Vaal became confused whilst the voting was taking place, and declared the United Kingdom's entry to be the winner before the last country, Ireland, had announced its votes. She also ended the programme by congratulating the winning song and country, and saying "goodbye" in several different languages.

== Contest overview ==
The contest took place on 8 April 1967, beginning at 22:00 CET.

Results of the Eurovision Song Contest 1967
R/O	Country	Artist	Song	Votes	Place
1	Netherlands	Thérèse Steinmetz	"Ringe-dinge"	2	14
2	Luxembourg	Vicky	"L'amour est bleu"	17	4
3	Austria	Peter Horton	"Warum es hunderttausend Sterne gibt"	2	14
4	France	Noëlle Cordier	"Il doit faire beau là-bas"	20	3
5	Portugal	Eduardo Nascimento	"O vento mudou"	3	12
6	Switzerland	Géraldine	"Quel cœur vas-tu briser ?"	0	17
7	Sweden	Östen Warnerbring	"Som en dröm"	7	8
8	Finland	Fredi	"Varjoon – suojaan"	3	12
9	Germany	Inge Brück	"Anouschka"	7	8
10	Belgium	Louis Neefs	"Ik heb zorgen"	8	7
11	United Kingdom	Sandie Shaw	"Puppet on a String"	47	1
12	Spain	Raphael	"Hablemos del amor"	9	6
13	Norway	Kirsti Sparboe	"Dukkemann"	2	14
14	Monaco	Minouche Barelli	"Boum-Badaboum"	10	5
15	Yugoslavia	Lado Leskovar	"Vse rože sveta"	7	8
16	Italy	Claudio Villa	"Non andare più lontano"	4	11
17	Ireland	Sean Dunphy	"If I Could Choose"	22	2

=== Spokespersons ===
Each participating broadcaster appointed a spokesperson who was responsible for announcing the votes for its respective country via telephone. Known spokespersons at the 1967 contest are listed below.

- Finland – Poppe Berg
- Ireland – Gay Byrne
- Luxembourg – Paul Ulveling
- Norway – Sverre Christophersen
- Spain – Margarita Nicola
- Sweden – Edvard Matz
- United Kingdom – Michael Aspel

== Detailed voting results ==
Every participating broadcaster assembled a jury panel of ten people. Every jury member could give one vote to his or her favourite song, except that representing their own country. This means that any song could receive a maximum of 10 votes from a national jury, but none achieved this. The highest number of votes a song received from a jury was seven, received by the song from the United Kingdom three times (from the juries of Norway, Switzerland, and France). The Portuguese jury gave eight songs only one vote, and one song (the Spanish one) two votes.

The voting sequence was one of the more chaotic in Eurovision history; the students from the University of Vienna who were operating the scoreboard made several errors during the telecast, which were corrected by the scrutineer. Hostess Erica Vaal also began to announce the winner before realising she had excluded the last jury to vote, the Irish jury.

Detailed voting results
		Total score	Netherlands	Luxembourg	Austria	France	Portugal	Switzerland	Sweden	Finland	Germany	Belgium	United Kingdom	Spain	Norway	Monaco	Yugoslavia	Italy	Ireland
Contestants	Netherlands	2											1						1
Contestants	Luxembourg	17	4							2		1	2	1		1	1	3	2
Contestants	Austria	2					1										1		
Contestants	France	20	1	2	1			1	4		2		2			2	4		1
Contestants	Portugal	3				1		1						1					
Contestants	Switzerland	0																	
Contestants	Sweden	7					1			1					2		1		2
Contestants	Finland	3	1				1											1	
Contestants	Germany	7					1		1			1	1		1			1	1
Contestants	Belgium	8					1			3	1		1				1		1
Contestants	United Kingdom	47	2	5	3	7	1	7	1	2	3	3			7	3		2	1
Contestants	Spain	9	1	1	1		2					1				2	1		
Contestants	Norway	2	1						1										
Contestants	Monaco	10			2	1			1					5				1	
Contestants	Yugoslavia	7		1		1	1					1		2				1	
Contestants	Italy	4						1					1	1					1
Contestants	Ireland	22		1	3		1		2	2	4	3	2			2	1	1	

== Broadcasts ==
Each participating broadcaster was required to relay the contest via its networks. Non-participating EBU member broadcasters were also able to relay the contest as "passive participants". Broadcasters were able to send commentators to provide coverage of the contest in their own native language and to relay information about the artists and songs to their television viewers. Reports estimated the global viewership to be 150 to 350 million viewers.

Known details on the broadcasts in each country, including the specific broadcasting stations and commentators are shown in the tables below. In addition to the participating countries, the contest was also reportedly broadcast in Czechoslovakia, East Germany, Poland and the Soviet Union via Intervision.

Broadcasters and commentators in participating countries
Country	Broadcaster	Channel(s)	Commentator(s)	Ref(s)
Austria	ORF	FS1	Emil Kollpacher	
Belgium	BRT	BRT	Herman Verelst	
Belgium	RTB	RTB	Paule Herreman	
Belgium	RTB	RTB 3		
Finland	YLE	TV-ohjelma 1, Yleisohjelma	Aarno Walli	
Finland	YLE	Ruotsinkielinen ulaohjelma		
France	ORTF	Première Chaîne, France Inter	Pierre Tchernia	
Germany	ARD	Deutsches Fernsehen	Hans-Joachim Rauschenbach	
Ireland	RTÉ	RTÉ	Brendan O'Reilly	
Ireland	RTÉ	RTÉ Radio	Kevin Roche	
Italy	RAI	Secondo Programma TV	Renato Tagliani	
Luxembourg	CLT	Télé-Luxembourg		
Netherlands	NTS	Nederland 1	Leo Nelissen	
Netherlands	VARA	Hilversum 1 (Note: Ten-minute summary broadcast at 23:45 (CET))		
Norway	NRK	NRK Fjernsynet, NRK	Erik Diesen	
Portugal	RTP	RTP		
Spain	TVE	TVE 1, TVE Canarias (Note: Deferred broadcast on TVE Canarias the following day at 23:00 (WET))	José Luis Uribarri	
Spain	RNE	RNE		
Spain	RNE	Radio Peninsular de Barcelona		
Spain	Radio España			
Sweden	SR	Sveriges TV, SR P3	Christina Hansegård	
Switzerland	SRG SSR	TV DRS		
Switzerland	SRG SSR	TSR, Radio Genève	Robert Burnier	
Switzerland	SRG SSR	TSI		
Switzerland	SRG SSR	Radio Bern (Note: Delayed broadcast on 11 April 1967 at 22:15 (CET))		
United Kingdom	BBC	BBC1	Rolf Harris	
United Kingdom	BFBS	BFBS Radio	Thurston Holland	
Yugoslavia	JRT	Televizija Beograd		
Yugoslavia	JRT	Televizija Ljubljana		
Yugoslavia	JRT	Televizija Zagreb		

Broadcasters and commentators in non-participating countries
Country	Broadcaster	Channel(s)	Commentator(s)	Ref(s)
Czechoslovakia	ČST	ČST (Note: Delayed broadcast on 9 April 1967 at 20:15 (CET))	Vladimír Dvořák	
Hungary	MTV	MTV		
Poland	TP	TV Polska		
Romania	TVR	TVR (Note: Delayed broadcast on 15 April 1967 at 22:15 (EET))		
