= Puppet on a String (Sandie Shaw song) =

1967 song by Sandie Shaw

- One of solid centre variants of the UK single

Single by Sandie Shaw

from the album Puppet on a String
- B-side: "Tell the Boys"
- Released: 7 March 1967
- Recorded: 1967
- Genre: Europop; easy listening
- Length: 2:21
- Label: Pye
- Songwriters: Bill Martin; Phil Coulter
- Producer: Ken Woodman

Sandie Shaw singles chronology
"I Don't Need Anything" (1967)	"Puppet on a String" (1967)	"Tonight in Tokyo" (1967)

Performance video
- "Puppet on a String" on YouTube at Beat-Club

Eurovision Song Contest 1967 entry
- Country: United Kingdom
- Artist: Sandie Shaw
- Language: English
- Composers: Bill Martin; Phil Coulter
- Lyricists: Bill Martin; Phil Coulter
- Conductor: Kenny Woodman

Finals performance
- Final result: 1st
- Final points: 47

Entry chronology
- ◄ "A Man Without Love" (1966)
- "Congratulations" (1968) ►

Official performance video
- "Puppet on a String" on YouTube

"Puppet on a String" is a song recorded by the English singer Sandie Shaw, written by Bill Martin and Phil Coulter. It represented the United Kingdom in the Eurovision Song Contest 1967, held in Vienna, winning the contest, becoming the first of the United Kingdom's five Eurovision wins.

As her thirteenth UK single release, "Puppet on a String" became a UK Singles Chart number one hit on 27 April 1967, staying at the top for a total of three weeks. On the Billboard charts in the United States, a 1967 version by Al Hirt went to number 18 on the Adult Contemporary chart and missed the main Hot 100 chart, though it appeared at number 129 on the Bubbling Under Hot 100 list of songs nearing the Hot 100.

== Background ==
=== Conception ===
"Puppet on a String" was written by Bill Martin and Phil Coulter, and recorded by Sandie Shaw.

=== Selection ===
The British Broadcasting Corporation (BBC) internally selected Shaw as their representative for the 12th edition of the Eurovision Song Contest. She had never been taken with the idea of taking part in the contest but her discoverer, Adam Faith, had talked her into it, saying it would keep her manager Eve Taylor happy. Taylor wanted to give Shaw a more cabaret appeal and felt that this was the right move – and also felt that it would get Shaw back in the public's good books as she had recently been involved in a divorce scandal.

Shaw performed the song as one of five prospective numbers for the contest on The Rolf Harris Show. Of the five songs, "Puppet on a String" was Shaw's least favourite. In her own words, "I hated it from the very first 'oompah' to the final 'bang' on the big bass drum. I was instinctively repelled by its sexist drivel and cuckoo-clock tune". On 25 February 1967, Shaw performed the five songs on A Song for Europe 1967, the national final organized by the BBC to select the song she would perform in the contest. The winner was chosen by postcard voting and on 4 March the BBC announced that "Puppet on a String" had won the competition becoming the British entry for Eurovision.

Shaw also recorded "Puppet on a String" in French –as "Un tout petit pantin"–, Italian –"La danza delle note"–, Spanish –"Marionetas en la cuerda"–, and German –"Wiedehopf im Mai"–.

=== Eurovision ===
On 8 April 1967, the Eurovision Song Contest was held at the Großer Festsaal der Wiener Hofburg in Vienna hosted by Österreichischer Rundfunk (ORF), and broadcast live throughout the continent. Shaw performed "Puppet on a String" eleventh on the night, following Belgium's "Ik heb zorgen" by Louis Neefs and preceding Spain's "Hablemos del amor" by Raphael. Kenny Woodman conducted the live orchestra in the performance of the British entry.

At the close of voting, the song had received 47 points, placing it first in a field of sixteen, and winning the contest

=== Aftermath ===
As a result of it winning the Eurovision Song Contest, "Puppet on a String" became Shaw's third number one hit in the UK –a record for a woman at the time– and was a big worldwide smash. Globally, the single achieved sales in excess of four million, making it the biggest-selling winning Eurovision track to date. Some estimates suggest this makes the track the biggest selling single by a British female artist of all time.

Shaw performed her song in the Eurovision twenty-fifth anniversary show Songs of Europe held on 22 August 1981 in Mysen.

== Chart history ==
=== Weekly charts ===
Chart (1967)	Peak position
Argentina (ACPVP)	1
Australia (Go-Set National Top 40)	2
Austria (Ö3 Austria Top 40)	1
Belgium (Ultratop 50 Flanders)	1
Belgium (Ultratop 50 Wallonia)	1
Canada (Canadian Singles Chart)	13
Denmark (Danish Singles Chart)	2
Finland (Suomen virallinen lista)	5
France (Institut français d'opinion publique)	2
Ireland (IRMA)	1
Italy (Musica e dischi)	8
Malaysia (Radio Malaysia)	2
Netherlands (Veronica Top 40)	1
Netherlands (Mega Top 30)	1
New Zealand (PPNZ)	2
Norway (VG-lista)	1
Singapore (Radio Singapore)	3
South Africa (Entertainment Monitoring Africa)	3
Spain (Cadena SER)	1
Sweden (Kvällstoppen)	1
Switzerland (Schweizer Hitparade)	1
UK Singles (OCC)	1
Venezuela	6
West Germany (Schallplatte)	1

=== Sales ===
Region	Copies
Belgium	45,000
Germany	750,000
Worldwide	4,000,000

== Legacy ==
=== Cover versions ===
The song was covered in over 200 versions in over 30 languages.

Covers include:

- Argentine: "Títere" (1967), by Violeta Rivas.
- Basque: "Txoriburuak Sokan" (1967), by Irune & Andoni Argoitia.
- Chilean: "Las Marionetas en la Cuerda" (1967), by Gloria Benavides.
- Chinese:
  - Betty Chung.
  - Singaporean singer Lara Tan.
- Czech: "Louka" (1967), by Yvonne Přenosilová.
- Danish - "Lille Marionet" (1967), by Grethe Sønck.
- Dutch: "Speelbal in de Wind" (1967), by Reggy van der Burgt and Anneke Grönloh.
- Estonian: "Hüpiknukk" (1967), by Heli Lääts.
- Finnish: "Sätkynukke" (1967), by Marja-Leena.
- French: "Un tout petit pantin" (1967), by Les Parisiennes, and Tonia.
- Hungarian: "Paprikajancsi" (1967), by Zsuzsa Koncz.
- Icelandic: "Þú kyssir mig" (1967), by Helena Eyjólfsdóttir.
- Lithuanian: "Lélé" (2006), by Violeta Riaubiškytė.
- Mexican: "Muñeco de Cuerda" (1967), by Los Rocking Devils.
- Norwegian: "Sprellemann" (1967), by Bente Aaseth.
- Polish: "Marionetka" (1967), by Halina Kunicka.
- Portuguese: "Marionette" (1967), by Simone de Oliveira "Feira Popular" (1990), by Ana Faria and children/teenpop group Onda Choc, on their eighth album with the same title.
- Brazilian Portuguese: "Estou Feliz" (1967), by Ed Carlos and Katia Cilene.
- Russian: "Ya ne kukla" (Я не кукла, "I am Not a Puppet"; 1968), by Emil Gorovets.
- Serbian: "Marioneta" ("Marionette", 1967), by Sanjalice.
- Slovak: "Ako malý psík" ("Like a puppy", 1967), by Tatjana Hubinská (0130166 Supraphon, mono); released on the day after the Eurovision Song Contest. Ako malý psík was also covered by Jana Procházková.
- Slovenian: "Marioneta" (1967), by Majda Sepe.
- Spanish: "Las Marionetas en la Cuerda" (1967), by Gloria Lasso.
- Swedish: "Sprattelgumma" (1967), by Siw Malmkvist.
- Tamil: by Nantha Balan Selvanayagam (1969).

=== In popular culture ===
The song was featured in the 1975 Bulgarian cartoon Buffo-Synchronists by Proiko Proikov and the soundtrack of the 2021 film Last Night in Soho. In July 2024, the song was sampled by English singer Jade, for her debut single titled "Angel of My Dreams".

Preceded by "Merci, Chérie" by Udo Jürgens	Eurovision Song Contest winners 1967	Succeeded by "La, la, la" by Massiel
