= L'amour est bleu =

1967 song by Vicky Leandros

Single by Vicky Leandros
- Language: French
- B-side: "Le Soleil A Quitté Ma Maison"
- Released: 1967
- Length: 2:59
- Composer: André Popp
- Lyricist: Pierre Cour

Eurovision Song Contest 1967 entry
- Country: Luxembourg
- Artist: Vicky Leandros
- As: Vicky
- Language: French
- Composer: André Popp
- Lyricist: Pierre Cour
- Conductor: Claude Denjean

Finals performance
- Final result: 4th
- Final points: 17

Entry chronology
- ◄ "Ce soir je t'attendais" (1966)
- "Nous vivrons d'amour" (1968) ►

"L'amour est bleu" (French pronunciation: [lamuʁ ɛ blø]; "Love Is Blue") is a song recorded by Greek singer Vicky Leandros with music composed by André Popp and French lyrics written by Pierre Cour. It represented Luxembourg in the Eurovision Song Contest 1967 held in Vienna, placing fourth.

It has since been recorded by many other musicians, most notably French orchestra leader Paul Mauriat, whose familiar instrumental version – recorded in late 1967 – became the first number-one by a French lead artist to top the Billboard Hot 100 in the United States.

== Background ==
=== Conception ===
"L'amour est bleu" was composed by André Popp with French lyrics by Pierre Cour. It describes the pleasure and pain of love in terms of colours (blue and grey) and elements (water and wind). The lyrics of the English version ("Blue, blue, my world is blue …") focus on colours only (blue, grey, red, green, and black), using them to describe components of lost love.

=== Eurovision ===
The Compagnie Luxembourgeoise de Télédiffusion (CLT) internally selected "L'amour est bleu" as its entry for the 12th edition of the Eurovision Song Contest, and a Greek-born 17-year-old Vicky Leandros, as Vicky.

In addition to the French-language original version, she recorded the song in English –as "Colours of Love" with lyrics by Bryan Blackburn–, German –as "Blau wie das Meer" with lyrics by Klaus Munro–, Italian –as "L'amore è blu"–, and Dutch –as "Liefde is zacht"–, that were released in nineteen countries.

On 8 April 1967, the Eurovision Song Contest was held at the Großer Festsaal der Wiener Hofburg in Vienna hosted by Österreichischer Rundfunk (ORF), and broadcast live throughout the continent. Vicky performed "L'amour est bleu" as the second song of the evening. Claude Denjean conducted the event's live orchestra in the performance of the entry.

At the close of voting, It had received 17 points, placing it fourth in a field of seventeen, behind "Il doit faire beau là-bas" (France), "If I Could Choose" (Ireland) and the winning song, "Puppet on a String" (United Kingdom). It was succeeded as Luxembourgian representative at the 1968 contest by "Nous vivrons d'amour" by Chris Baldo & Sophie Garel.

=== Aftermath ===
Vicky Leandros went on to win Eurovision five years later with the song "Après toi", again representing Luxembourg.

"L'amour est bleu" achieved greater success through cover versions of the song by other artists. Some forty years after its original release, "L'amour est bleu", along with Domenico Modugno's "Nel blu dipinto di blu" (better known as "Volare") and Mocedades' "Eres tú", still counts as one of very few non-winning Eurovision entries ever to become a worldwide hit. The song has since become a favourite of Contest fans, most notably appearing as part of a medley introducing the semi-final of the Eurovision Song Contest 2006 in Athens, one of only three non-winning songs to be involved (the others being "Dschinghis Khan" and "Nel blu dipinto di blu").

In 2026, Vicky Leandros returned to Eurovision to perform "L'amour est bleu" at the opening of the first semi-final as part of celebrations marking the 70th contest. Her performance was the culmination of a montage of past Eurovision moments as viewed by a man called Tony who was seen (portrayed by multiple actors) as a boy as the 1950s Eurovision moments played out, and was then seen moving through the various stages of his life as the moments from the contest being played moved through the decades and showed the contest moving through different stages of its own existence.

== Charts ==
The song was a modest hit in Europe, and had some success in Japan and Canada (No. 40).

=== Weekly charts ===
Chart (1967–1968)	Peak position
Austria (Ö3 Austria Top 40)	18
Belgium (Ultratop 50 Wallonia)	45
Canada Top Singles (RPM)	40
Japan	15
West Germany (GfK)	27

Chart (2026)	Peak position
Croatia International Airplay (Top lista)	63

== Legacy ==
=== Paul Mauriat version ===
"Love Is Blue (L'amour est bleu)"

Single by Paul Mauriat

from the album Le Grand Orchestre de Paul Mauriat – Volume 5
- B-side: "Alone in the World (Seuls Au Monde)" (most countries, including initial NA pressings); "Sunny" (NA, hit pressings); "Une Petite Cantate" (UK)
- Released: January 1968
- Recorded: Late 1967
- Genre: Easy listening; baroque pop; orchestral pop
- Length: 2:31
- Label: Philips
- Songwriters: André Popp, Pierre Cour

Paul Mauriat singles chronology
"Puppet on a String" (1967)	"Love Is Blue (L'amour est bleu)" (1968)	"Love in Every Room" (1968)

According to Paul Mauriat, who conducted/recorded an orchestral "easy listening" version of "Love Is Blue", he chose the song because it was published by his label, Philips Records, even though he was not fond of the song. A DJ in Minneapolis played the recording and asked the audience to respond, and was inundated with phone calls about the song, and interest in the song then quickly spread around the country.

The song became a number-one hit in the USA for five weeks in February and March 1968, the first recording by a French artist to top the Billboard Hot 100. (It remained the only French song to top the chart until 2017, when Daft Punk was a featured artist on Canadian artist The Weeknd's number-one hit "Starboy".) Mauriat's version became a gold record, and its five-week run at the top is the second longest of any instrumental of the Hot 100 era, after "Theme from A Summer Place". The song also spent 11 weeks atop Billboard's Easy Listening survey, and held the longest-lasting title honours on this chart for 25 years. Billboard ranked the record as the No. 2 song for 1968. It is the best-known version of the song in the United States. The Mauriat recording also reached No. 2 in Canada (No. 12 Year End), and No. 12 on the UK Singles Chart. The Mauriat album containing "Love Is Blue", Blooming Hits, also reached No. 1 on the Billboard Top LP's and Tapes chart for five weeks. The song sold fewer than 30,000 units in France, but 2 million singles and 800,000 LPs were sold in the US.

==== In popular culture ====
- Mauriat's version was featured repeatedly in an episode of Chris Carter's television series Millennium titled "A Room with No View", which originally aired on 24 April 1998 on the Fox Network. During the episode, the omnipresent melody is used by a kidnapper to brainwash a group of youths.
- It was played over the closing credits of Mad Men's sixth-season episode "The Flood", set in April 1968.
- Mauriat's version is used on the opening credits of the 2023 film The Last Stop in Yuma County.

==== Charts ====
===== Weekly charts =====
Chart (1968)	Peak position
Australia	1
Austria (Ö3 Austria Top 40)	19
Belgium (Ultratop 50 Wallonia)	45
Canada Top Singles (RPM)	2
Ireland (IRMA)	15
Italy (Musica e dischi)	4
Japan	18
Malaysia (Radio Malaysia)	1
Netherlands (Single Top 100)	15
New Zealand (Listener)	4
Norway (VG-lista)	6
South Africa (Springbok Radio)	1
UK Singles (Official Charts)	12
US Billboard Hot 100	1
West Germany (GfK)	32

===== All-time charts =====
Chart (1958-2018)	Position
US Billboard Hot 100	174

=== Other covers ===
- Three other recordings of the song charted on Billboard Hot 100 together with Paul Mauriat's version at the same time in 1968. Al Martino's "Love is Blue" peaked at No. 57 on the Billboard Hot 100 and No. 3 on the Billboard Adult Contemporary charts, and was the title song of one of his 1968 albums. Claudine Longet's "Love Is Blue (L'amour est bleu)" peaked at No. 71, while Manny Kellem's version reached No. 100.
- Jeff Beck recorded a rock interpretation of Mauriat's version in 1968. It reached No. 20 in Ireland, and No. 23 on the UK Singles Chart.
- The Dells recorded a soul medley, "I Can Sing a Rainbow/Love Is Blue", which reached No. 22 in the Billboard Hot 100 and No. 5 in the Billboard R&B Singles charts in the US, No. 10 in the Dutch chart, No. 18 in Ireland, and No. 16 in the UK charts, in 1969.
