= Portugal in the Eurovision Song Contest 1967 =

- Eurovision Song Contest 1967
- Participating broadcaster: Radiotelevisão Portuguesa (RTP)
- Country: Portugal
- Selection process: Grande Prémio TV da Canção Portuguesa 1967
- Selection date: 25 February 1967

Competing entry
- Song: "O vento mudou"
- Artist: Eduardo Nascimento
- Songwriters: Nuno Nazareth Fernandes; João Magalhães Pereira

Placement
- Final result: 12th, 3 points

Participation chronology

Portugal was represented at the Eurovision Song Contest 1967 with the song "O vento mudou", composed by Nuno Nazareth Fernandes, with lyrics by João Magalhães Pereira, and performed by Eduardo Nascimento. The Portuguese participating broadcaster, Radiotelevisão Portuguesa (RTP), selected its entry at the Grande Prémio TV da Canção Portuguesa 1967. Nascimento was the first black male singer in the history of Eurovision.

== Before Eurovision ==
=== Grande Prémio TV da Canção Portuguesa 1967 ===
Radiotelevisão Portuguesa (RTP) held the Grande Prémio TV da Canção Portuguesa 1967 at Tóbis studios in Lisbon, hosted by Isabel Wolmar and Henrique Mendes. For the first time, semi-finals where held, the first on 11 February at 22:25 UTC and the second on 18 February at 22:25 UTC. Each semi-final featured six competing entries from which three advanced to the final from each show. A total of twelve songs took part in the final. Armando Tavares Belo conducted all the songs. The results were determined by a distrital jury, composed by three members, each had 5 votes to be distributed among the songs it intended to award, making a total of 15 votes per district.

Semi-final 1 – 11 February 1967
R/O	Artist	Song	Votes	Place	Result
1	Rui Malhoa	"Balada da traição ao mar"	43	4	—N/a
2	Marco Paulo	"Sou tão feliz"	54	2	Qualified
3	Valério Silva	"Amor tens de voltar"	41	5	—N/a
4	Maria de Lurdes Resende	"Não quero o mundo"	53	3	Qualified
5	Duo Ouro Negro	"Quando amanhecer"	72	1	Qualified
6	Maria de Lurdes Resende	"Assim será o nosso amor"	7	6	—N/a

Semi-final 2 – 18 February 1967
R/O	Artist	Song	Votes	Place	Result
1	Duo Ouro Negro	"Livro sem fim"	76	2	Qualified
2	Eduardo Nascimento	"O vento mudou"	78	1	Qualified
3	Artur Garcia	"Porta secreta"	55	3	Qualified
4	António Calvário	"Deixa-me só"	44	4	—N/a
5	Eduardo Nascimento	"Um homem só"	9	5	—N/a
6	António Calvário	"Vencerás"	8	6	—N/a

Final – 25 February 1967
R/O	Artist	Song	Votes	Place
1	Duo Ouro Negro	"Quando amanhecer"	28	4
2	Eduardo Nascimento	"O vento mudou"	120	1
3	Marco Paulo	"Sou tão feliz"	5	6
4	Duo Ouro Negro	"Livro sem fim"	78	2
5	Maria de Lurdes Resende	"Não quero o mundo"	30	3
6	Artur Garcia	"Porta secreta"	9	5

Detailed Distrital Jury Votes
R/O	Song	Aveiro	Beja	Braga	Bragança	Castelo Branco	Coimbra	Évora	Faro	Guarda	Leiria	Lisbon	Portalegre	Porto	Santarém	Setúbal	Viana do Castelo	Vila Real	Viseu	Total
1	"Quando amanhecer"			1			15			5	1		1		2			3		28
2	"O vento mudou"	3	3	7	11	5		8	5	8	11	12	10	5	1	6	11	7	7	120
3	"Sou tão feliz"		2								1				2					5
4	"Livro sem fim"	11	5		3	10		1	10	1	1	3	3	10	1	7		5	7	78
5	"Não quero o mundo"		4	5				4			1		1		9	2	4			30
6	"Porta secreta"	1	1	2	1			2		1									1	9

== At Eurovision ==
On the night of the final Nascimento performed 5th in the running order, following France and preceding Switzerland. At the close of the voting the song had received 3 points, coming 12th in the field of 17 competing countries.

The orchestra during the Portuguese entry was conducted by Armando Tavares Belo.

=== Voting ===
Points awarded to Portugal
Score	Country
1 point	France; Spain; Switzerland

Points awarded by Portugal
Score	Country
2 points	Spain
1 point	Austria; Belgium; Finland; Germany; Ireland; Sweden; United Kingdom; Yugoslavia
