= Belgium in the Eurovision Song Contest 1967 =

- Eurovision Song Contest 1967
- Participating broadcaster: Belgische Radio- en Televisieomroep (BRT)
- Country: Belgium
- Selection process: Canzonissima 1967
- Selection date: 25 February 1967

Competing entry
- Song: "Ik heb zorgen"
- Artist: Louis Neefs
- Songwriters: Paul Quintens; Phil van Cauwenbergh

Placement
- Final result: 7th, 8 points

Participation chronology

Belgium was represented at the Eurovision Song Contest 1967 with the song "Ik heb zorgen", composed by Paul Quintens, with lyrics by Phil van Cauwenbergh, and performed by Louis Neefs. The Belgian participating broadcaster, Dutch-speaking Belgische Radio- en Televisieomroep (BRT), selected its entry through a national final. Neefs would represent Belgium again in 1969.

== Before Eurovision ==
=== Canzonissima ===
Canzonissima was the national final format developed by Dutch-speaking broadcaster Belgische Radio- en Televisieomroep (BRT) which determined the song that would represent Belgium at the Eurovision Song Contest 1967. This was the 2nd edition of Canzonissima, after previously being used to select BRT's 1963 entry. The competition consisted of nine semi-finals held between October 1966 and February 1967, and a final on 25 February 1967. All shows were held in the Amerikaans Theater in Brussels, and hosted by Jan Theys.

==== Format ====
Canzonissima 1967 consisted of nine semi-finals and a final. Ten artists competed in each semi-final and the top three songs would appear again in the next semi-final, while the other seven artists would have to select new songs. For a song to qualify to the final, it would have to get top three in three consecutive semi-finals.

==== Competing entries ====
BRT shortlisted 10 artists for Canzonissima 1967: Rita Deneve, Kalinka, Marva, Ann Soetaert, Chris Wijnen, Hugo Dellas, Jimmy Frey, Louis Neefs, Ronny Temmer, and Will Tura. However, Will Tura was eventually replaced by Johnny White for unknown reasons. A total of 70 songs took part in Canzonissima 1967.

Competing entries
Artist	Song	Songwriter(s)	
Artist	Song	Composer(s)	Lyricist(s)
Ann Soetaert	"Alles ben jij"	Johan Stollz	Mary Boduin
Ann Soetaert	"Daar in Wenen"	Johan Stollz	Henk André
Ann Soetaert	"Ik blijf bij jou"	Santiago Vasco	Dick Emcé
Ann Soetaert	"Rio de Janeiro"	Al Van Dam; Rudy Witt	Dick Emcé
Ann Soetaert	"Snoepie"	Santiago Vasco	Dick Emcé
Ann Soetaert	"Verlangen"	Johan Stollz	Mary Boduin
Chris Wijnen	"De tijd"	Armand Van de Walle	Will Ferdy
Chris Wijnen	"Ga naar huis"	Freddy Sunder	Toon Van Severen
Chris Wijnen	"Herfstregen"	Freddy Sunder; E. Wall	André Vélin
Chris Wijnen	"Tot wederziens"	Armand Van de Walle; Jean Evans	André Vélin
Chris Wijnen	"Want ik hield van jou"	Jean Evans; Armand Van de Walle	Lieven Paemen
Chris Wijnen	"Wondermooi"	Clem De Maeyer; E. Chantrain	Will Ferdy
Hugo Dellas	"Anne-Marieke"	André Deboeur	Simone Kaesen
Hugo Dellas	"De torens van Babel"	André Deboeur; Jean Roderès	Hugo Dellas
Hugo Dellas	"Familieportret"	André Deboeur; Jean Roderès	Hugo Dellas
Hugo Dellas	"Hoor je dat hart"	André Deboeur; Etienne Verschueren	Hugo Dellas
Hugo Dellas	"Israël"	André Deboeur; Jean Roderès	Hugo Dellas
Hugo Dellas	"Jazz met de muze"	André Deboeur; Jean Roderès	Hugo Dellas
Hugo Dellas	"Lina"	André Deboeur	Hugo Dellas
Hugo Dellas	"Zij"	André Deboeur; Jean Roderès	Hugo Dellas
Jimmy Frey	"De stad"	Rocco Granata; Dan Ellery	Phil Van Cauwenbergh
Jimmy Frey	"Eenzaam"	Johan Stollz	Jimmy Frey
Jimmy Frey	"Help me, o Heer"	José Veronne	Nelly Bijl
Jimmy Frey	"Ik geloof"	Bobbejaan Schoepen	Bobbejaan Schoepen; Louis Baret
Jimmy Frey	"In Lerida"	Ronny Sigo	Phil Van Cauwenbergh
Jimmy Frey	"Laat me maar dromen"	Bobbejaan Schoepen	
Jimmy Frey	"Stop"	Nelly Bijl	Jimmy Frey
Jimmy Frey	"Zal het morgen zijn"	Jacques Raymond; Gerd Frank	
Jimmy Frey	"Zomer, winter"	Bobbejaan Schoepen	Bobbejaan Schoepen; Louis Baret
Johnny White	"Als ik tussen de regels lees"	Al Van Dam	Dick Emcé
Johnny White	"Het sprookje"	Al Van Dam	Ernie Sons
Johnny White	"Hey, hey meisje"	Al Van Dam	Dick Emcé
Johnny White	"Ik ga niet weg"	Al Van Dam	Dick Emcé
Johnny White	"Ik kan zonder liefde niet gelukkig zijn"	Al Van Dam	Dick Emcé
Johnny White	"Mijn liefde"	Al Van Dam	Ria Denaro
Johnny White	"Regen"	Al Van Dam	Dick Emcé
Johnny White	"Waar ben je"	Paul Quintens	Phil Van Cauwenbergh
Kalinka	"De wind"	Frans l'Eglise; Lieve Willems	André Coucke
Kalinka	"Een strand vol eenzaamheid"	Jef Van den Berg	Phil Van Cauwenbergh
Kalinka	"Nerantsoula"	André Coucke	Phil Van Cauwenbergh
Kalinka	"Voorbij"	Paul Quintens	Phil Van Cauwenbergh
Kalinka	"Waar is de zomer"	Willy Crombé	Phil Van Cauwenbergh
Louis Neefs	"Alleen met z'n tweeën"	Freddy Sunder	Mary Boduin; Anton Peters
Louis Neefs	"Een huis in Attica"	Hans Flower	Phil Van Cauwenbergh
Louis Neefs	"Het ding in mijn dakgoot"	Gerd Frank	Phil Van Cauwenbergh
Louis Neefs	"Ik heb zorgen"	Paul Quintens	Phil Van Cauwenbergh
Louis Neefs	"Ik weet niet wat ik heb"	Gerd Frank	Phil Van Cauwenbergh
Louis Neefs	"Jij was zo mooi"	Paul Quintens	Phil Van Cauwenbergh
Marva	"Daar liep eens een meisje"	A. Poppe	Lia Cliquet-De Vos
Marva	"Denk je misschien"	Rocco Granata	Will Ferdy
Marva	"Een eiland in groen en blauw"	Rocco Granata	Phil Van Cauwenbergh
Marva	"Ergens vind ik je weer"	André Poppe	Lia Cliquet
Marva	"'t Is nooit te laat"	Gerd Frank	Ke Riema
Marva	"Uit rijden"	Gerd Frank	Phil Van Cauwenbergh
Marva	"Wij"	Rocco Granata	Ke Riema
Marva	"Zonder jou"	Jackie Jackson	André Simmoens
Rita Deneve	"De eerste kus"	Gerd Frank	Jacques Raymond
Rita Deneve	"De langste nacht"	Marco Varez	Dick Emcé
Rita Deneve	"Droombeeld"	Roger Mores	André Vélin
Rita Deneve	"Er is toch altijd ergens iemand"	Paul Quintens	Phil Van Cauwenbergh
Rita Deneve	"Je naam"	Peter Loland	Herman Bruggen
Rita Deneve	"Sinds ik jou heb ontmoet"	Paul Quintens	Phil Van Cauwenbergh
Rita Deneve	"'t Verlangen naar jou"	Raoul Claeys	Will Ferdy
Ronny Temmer	"De ranke roos"	Al Van Dam	Dick Emcé
Ronny Temmer	"De schone slaapster"	Al Van Dam	Dick Emcé
Ronny Temmer	"Ik droom van een lied"	Al Van Dam	Dick Emcé
Ronny Temmer	"Jij bent voor mij"	Al Van Dam; Marcel Mortier	Dick Emcé
Ronny Temmer	"Liefdesverdriet"	Al Van Dam	Dick Emcé
Ronny Temmer	"Nooit of nooit"	Al Van Dam	Dick Emcé
Ronny Temmer	"Zomerliefde"	Al Van Dam	André Vélin

==== Shows ====
===== Semi-finals =====
Voting in the semi-finals was done by a 10-member jury panel. Since songs introduced in semi-finals 8 or 9 could not get to the top 3 in 3 semi-finals and qualify for the final, the rules to qualify for the final were changed for semi-final 9. Songs had to receive at least 72.1 points, the average number of points that every song that qualified to the final got in their last semi-final.

Semi-final 1 – 22 October 1966
R/O	Artist	Song	Points	Place	Result
1	Johnny White	"Hey, hey meisje"	59.5	4	Advanced
2	Marva	"Uit rijden"	51.5	10	—N/a
3	Ronny Temmer	"De ranke roos"	63.0	3	Advanced
4	~~Chris Wijnen~~	~~"Wondermooi"~~	~~75.5~~	~~2~~	Disqualified
5	Jimmy Frey	"Stop"	57.0	6	—N/a
6	Rita Deneve	"Droombeeld"	55.5	7	—N/a
7	Louis Neefs	"Het ding in mijn dakgoot"	54.5	8	—N/a
8	~~Kalinka~~	~~"Waar is de zomer"~~	~~80.0~~	~~1~~	Disqualified
9	Hugo Dellas	"De torens van Babel"	52.5	9	—N/a
10	Ann Soetaert	"Rio de Janeiro"	59.5	4	Advanced

After semi-final 1, Louis van Rymenant, Ann Soetaert's producer, filed a complaint against "Waar is de zomer" and "Wondermooi" for lasting over 3 minutes during the show, despite lasting under 3 minutes during rehearsals. The two songs were disqualified and the two songs tied for 4th place qualified instead.

Semi-final 2 – 5 November 1966
R/O	Artist	Song	Points	Place	Result
1	Ronny Temmer	"De ranke roos"	67.0	2	Advanced
2	Ann Soetaert	"Rio de Janeiro"	55.5	10	—N/a
3	Louis Neefs	"Ik weet niet wat ik heb"	59.0	6	—N/a
4	Chris Wijnen	"De tijd"	68.0	1	Advanced
5	Jimmy Frey	"Ik geloof"	59.0	6	—N/a
6	Kalinka	"Nerantsoula"	66.5	4	—N/a
7	Hugo Dellas	"Israël"	56.0	9	—N/a
8	Marva	"'t Is nooit te laat"	63.5	5	—N/a
9	Johnny White	"Hey, hey meisje"	58.5	8	—N/a
10	Rita Deneve	"De eerste kus"	67.0	2	Advanced

Semi-final 2 was hosted by Willem Duys, as Jan Theys was sick.

Semi-final 3 – 19 November 1966
R/O	Artist	Song	Points	Place	Result
1	Hugo Dellas	"Lina"	64.0	6	—N/a
2	Chris Wijnen	"De tijd"	65.0	5	—N/a
3	Rita Deneve	"De eerste kus"	68.5	2	Advanced
4	Jimmy Frey	"Eenzaam"	59.0	7	—N/a
5	Ann Soetaert	"Snoepie"	47.5	9	—N/a
6	Ronny Temmer	"De ranke roos"	68.5	2	Qualified
7	Kalinka	"De wind"	73.0	1	Advanced
8	Johnny White	"Als ik tussen de regels lees"	51.5	8	—N/a
9	Marva	"Daar liep eens een meisje"	68.0	4	—N/a

Louis Neefs was absent from semi-final 3 as he was in Berlin for a TV programme and would have been too ill to return to Brussels in time.

Semi-final 4 – 3 December 1966
R/O	Artist	Song	Points	Place	Result
1	Rita Deneve	"De eerste kus"	74.0	2	Qualified
2	Louis Neefs	"Jij was zo mooi"	73.0	3	Advanced
3	Marva	"Zonder jou"	55.0	10	—N/a
4	Hugo Dellas	"Familieportret"	55.5	9	—N/a
5	Ann Soetaert	"Ik blijf bij jou"	65.5	5	—N/a
6	Jimmy Frey	"Zomer, winter"	57.0	8	—N/a
7	Kalinka	"De wind"	75.5	1	Advanced
8	Ronny Temmer	"Liefdesverdriet"	57.5	7	—N/a
9	Chris Wijnen	"Ga naar huis"	66.0	4	—N/a
10	Johnny White	"Mijn liefde"	61.5	6	—N/a

Semi-final 5 – 17 December 1966
R/O	Artist	Song	Points	Place	Result
1	Kalinka	"De wind"	69.5	2	Qualified
2	Johnny White	"Regen"	56.5	8	—N/a
3	Chris Wijnen	"Want ik hield van jou"	68.5	3	Advanced
4	Jimmy Frey	"Zal het morgen zijn"	66.5	5	—N/a
5	Rita Deneve	"Er is toch altijd ergens iemand"	63.5	6	—N/a
6	Ronny Temmer	"Zomerliefde"	57.0	7	—N/a
7	Marva	"Wij"	50.5	10	—N/a
8	Hugo Dellas	"Anne-Marieke"	67.5	4	—N/a
9	Ann Soetaert	"Daar in Wenen"	56.0	9	—N/a
10	Louis Neefs	"Jij was zo mooi"	74.0	1	Advanced

Semi-final 6 – 31 December 1966
R/O	Artist	Song	Points	Place	Result
1	Louis Neefs	"Jij was zo mooi"	75.0	1	Qualified
2	Ann Soetaert	"Verlangen"	74.5	2	Advanced
3	Ronny Temmer	"Jij bent voor mij"	54.0	8	—N/a
4	Marva	"Denk je misschien"	56.5	7	—N/a
5	Johnny White	"Ik ga niet weg"	54.0	8	—N/a
6	Kalinka	"Voorbij"	67.0	4	—N/a
7	Jimmy Frey	"In Lerida"	48.0	10	—N/a
8	Rita Deneve	"De langste nacht"	59.5	5	—N/a
9	Hugo Dellas	"Zij"	58.5	6	—N/a
10	Chris Wijnen	"Want ik hield van jou"	74.5	2	Advanced

Semi-final 6 was not broadcast live like the other eight semi-finals. It was recorded on the 30th December and broadcast on the 31st.

Semi-final 7 – 14 January 1967
R/O	Artist	Song	Points	Place	Result
1	Ann Soetaert	"Verlangen"	78.5	1	Advanced
2	Jimmy Frey	"Help me, o Heer"	62.0	5	—N/a
3	Chris Wijnen	"Want ik hield van jou"	74.0	2	Qualified
4	Johnny White	"Ik kan zonder liefde niet gelukkig zijn"	57.0	10	—N/a
5	Kalinka	"Een strand vol eenzaamheid"	65.5	3	Advanced
6	Hugo Dellas	"Jazz met de muze"	65.5	3	Advanced
7	Marva	"Ergens vind ik je weer"	63.0	5	—N/a
8	Louis Neefs	"Een huis in Attica"	60.0	9	—N/a
9	Rita Deneve	"Sinds ik jou heb ontmoet"	61.5	7	—N/a
10	Ronny Temmer	"De schone slaapster"	61.0	8	—N/a

Semi-final 8 – 28 January 1967
R/O	Artist	Song	Points	Place	Result
1	Chris Wijnen	"Herfstregen"	61.5	7	—N/a
2	Ronny Temmer	"Ik droom van een lied"	61.0	8	—N/a
3	Kalinka	"Een strand vol eenzaamheid"	67.5	3	Advanced
4	~~Louis Neefs~~	~~"Alleen met z'n tweeën"~~	~~73.0~~	~~2~~	Disqualified
5	Marva	"Een eiland in groen en blauw"	67.5	3	Advanced
6	Johnny White	"Het sprookje"	51.0	10	—N/a
7	Ann Soetaert	"Verlangen"	80.0	1	Qualified
8	Hugo Dellas	"Jazz met de muze"	66.5	5	—N/a
9	Rita Deneve	"'t Verlangen naar jou"	64.0	6	—N/a
10	Jimmy Frey	"Laat me maar dromen"	55.0	9	—N/a

After semi-final 8, Louis Neefs withdrew "Alleen met z'n tweeën" as he wanted to participate with a different song in semi-final 9.

Semi-final 9 – 11 February 1967
R/O	Artist	Song	Points	Place	Result
1	Marva	"Een eiland in groen en blauw"	72.0	2	—N/a
2	Jimmy Frey	"De stad"	64.5	6	—N/a
3	Ann Soetaert	"Alles ben jij"	68.0	4	—N/a
4	Johnny White	"Waar ben je"	64.0	7	—N/a
5	Kalinka	"Een strand vol eenzaamheid"	71.5	3	Qualified
6	Ronny Temmer	"Nooit of nooit"	53.0	8	—N/a
7	~~Rita Deneve~~	~~"Je naam"~~	—N/a	—N/a	Disqualified
8	Chris Wijnen	"Tot wederziens"	66.5	5	—N/a
9	Louis Neefs	"Ik heb zorgen"	78.0	1	Qualified
10	~~Hugo Dellas~~	~~"Hoor je dat hart"~~	—N/a	—N/a	Disqualified

After the songs were performed, "Je naam" and "Hoor je dat hart" were disqualified for lasting longer than 3 minutes.

===== Final =====
Even though eight songs qualified for the final, only seven songs took part, as Louis Neefs had decided to withdraw "Zij was zo mooi" in order not to run the risk of splitting his vote.

Voting was done by a 15-member jury who each gave one point to their favourite song. Only three of the songs registered any points on the board.

Final – 25 February 1967
R/O	Artist	Song	Points	Place
1	Ronny Temmer	"De ranke roos"	1	3
2	Kalinka	"De wind"	0	4
3	Rita Deneve	"Die eerste kus"	0	4
4	Kalinka	"Een strand vol eenzaamheid"	0	4
5	Louis Neefs	"Ik heb zorgen"	11	1
6	Ann Soetaert	"Verlangen"	3	2
7	Chris Wijnen	"Want ik hield van jou"	0	4

== At Eurovision ==
On the night of the final Neefs performed 10th in the running order, following Germany and preceding eventual contest winners the United Kingdom. At the close of the voting "Ik heb zorgen" had received 8 points (the highest being 3 from Finland), placing Belgium 7th of the 17 participating countries. The highest marks from the Belgian jury were 3s to Ireland and the United Kingdom.

=== Voting ===
Points awarded to Belgium
Score	Country
3 points	Finland
1 point	Germany; Ireland; Portugal; United Kingdom; Yugoslavia

Points awarded by Belgium
Score	Country
3 points	Ireland; United Kingdom
1 point	Germany; Luxembourg; Spain; Yugoslavia
