= Mollet =

Mollet may refer to:

== Places ==
- Mollet del Vallès, a municipality in Vallès Oriental Spain, Catalonia, Spain
- Mollet de Peralada, a municipality in Girona, Catalonia, Spain

== Persons with the surname ==
- Mollet family of gardeners:
  - Jacques Mollet, French gardener
  - Claude Mollet (circa 1564-shortly before 1649), French gardener to three French kings
  - André Mollet (died before 16 June 1665), French garden designer
- Clotilde Mollet, French actress
- Florent Mollet (born 1991), French footballer
- Guy Mollet (1905–1975), French politician and prime minister
- Marva Mollet (born 1943), Belgian singer
- Pierre Mollet (1920–2007), Swiss-Canadian operatic baritone
- Raoul Mollet (1912–2002), Belgian modern pentathlete
- Tommy Mollet (born 1979), Dutch taekwondo practitioner
