= Germany in the Eurovision Song Contest 1967 =

- Eurovision Song Contest 1967
- Participating broadcaster: ARD (Note: Arbeitsgemeinschaft der öffentlich-rechtlichen Rundfunkanstalten der Bundesrepublik Deutschland) – Hessischer Rundfunk (HR)
- Country: Germany
- Selection process: Internal selection
- Announcement date: 5 January 1967

Competing entry
- Song: "Anouschka"
- Artist: Inge Brück
- Songwriter: Hans Blum

Placement
- Final result: 8th, 7 points

Participation chronology

Germany was represented at the Eurovision Song Contest 1967 with the song "Anouschka", written by Hans Blum, and performed by Inge Brück. The German participating broadcaster on behalf of ARD, Hessischer Rundfunk (HR), internally selected its entry for the contest.

== Before Eurovision ==
=== Internal selection ===
145 songs were submitted to the selection. A jury presided by Hans-Otto Grünefeldt, television program director of HR, selected "Anouschka" at the Broadcasting House Dornbusch, the site which also served as venue for the Eurovision Song Contest 1957. The winning song was announced on 5 January 1967.

Song	Composer	Place
"Anouschka"	Hans Blum	1
"Die Nacht hat viele Gesichter"	Fred Strittmatter	2
"Das Glück dieser Welt"	Hubert Wolf	3

== At Eurovision ==
The contest was broadcast on Deutsches Fernsehen (with commentary by Hans-Joachim Rauschenbach).

On the evening of the final Brück performed ninth in the running order, following Finland and preceding Belgium. Voting in 1967 reverted to the system of 10-member national juries with one vote per member, and at the close of voting "Anouschka" had received 7 points (unusually, via 1 point apiece from seven different countries), placing Germany joint 8th (with Sweden and Yugoslavia) of the 17 entries. The German jury awarded its highest mark (4) to Ireland.

"Anouschka" was a sizeable hit in German-speaking markets, and remains one of the better-remembered German Eurovision entries of the 1960s.

=== Voting ===
Points awarded to Germany
Score	Country
1 point	Belgium; Ireland; Italy; Norway; Portugal; Sweden; United Kingdom

Points awarded by Germany
Score	Country
4 points	Ireland
3 points	United Kingdom
2 points	France
1 point	Belgium
