= Switzerland in the Eurovision Song Contest 1967 =

- Eurovision Song Contest 1967
- Participating broadcaster: Swiss Broadcasting Corporation (SRG SSR)
- Country: Switzerland
- Selection process: Grosser Preis der Eurovision 1967
- Selection date: 21 January 1967

Competing entry
- Song: "Quel coeur vas-tu briser ?"
- Artist: Géraldine
- Songwriters: Daniel Faure; Gérard Gray

Placement
- Final result: 17th, 0 votes

Participation chronology

Switzerland was represented at the Eurovision Song Contest 1967 with the song "Quel coeur vas-tu briser ?", composed by Daniel Faure, with lyrics by Gérard Gray, and performed by Géraldine. The Swiss participating broadcaster, the Swiss Broadcasting Corporation (SRG SSR), selected its entry through a national final.

== Before Eurovision ==
=== Grosser Preis der Eurovision 1967 ===
The Swiss Broadcasting Corporation (SRG SSR) held a national final to select its entry for the Eurovision Song Contest 1967. Six songs took part in the selection, with two songs being performed each in French, German, and Italian. Six artists took part to represent Switzerland, among whom was Anita Traversi— who represented Switzerland in 1960 and 1964.

Competing entries
Broadcaster	Artist	Song	Songwriter(s)		Language
Broadcaster	Artist	Song	Composer	Lyricist(s)	Language
TSR	Evelyne Arden	"Toi"	Marianne Gesseney		French
TSR	Géraldine	"Quel coeur vas-tu briser ?"	Daniel Faure	Gérard Gray	French
DRS	Brigitt Petry	"Karussell-Karussell"	Hazy Osterwald	Günter Loose	German
DRS	Elisa Gabbai	"Abendwind"	Dieter Klaus	Anton Peterer	German
TSI	Milena	"Farò come vuoi"	Mario Robbiani	Giorgio Calabrese; Ugo Mario Louera	Italian
TSI	Anita Traversi	"Non pensiamoci più"	Giovanni Pelli	Sanzio Chiesa	Italian

Swiss German and Romansh broadcaster Schweizer Fernsehen der deutschen und rätoromanischen Schweiz (SF DRS) staged the national final on 21 January 1967 at 20:45 CET at Theater 11 in Zürich. It was presented by Alfred Fetscherin, Madeleine Demartines, and Mascia Cantoni. Hans Moeckel served as the musical director and accompanied the orchestra. The national final was broadcast on TV DRS and TSR. Jo Roland, Ulla & Ulrik Neumann, the Horst Jankowski Choir, and Les Surfs made guest appearances.

The voting consisted of a twelve-member jury from the three regions of Switzerland, which featured six representatives from the Swiss-German and Romansh regions, four from Romandy (Swiss-French region), and two from Ticino (Swiss-Italian region). Each juror would give 3 points to their favorite song, 2 to their second favorite, and 1 to their third favorite. The winner was the song "Quel coeur vas-tu briser ?", written by Gérard Gray, composed by Daniel Faure, and performed by Géraldine.

Final – 21 January 1967
R/O	Artist	Song	Total	Place
1	Evelyne Arden	"Toi"	6	4
2	Brigitt Petry	"Karussell-Karussell"	12	3
3	Milena	"Farò come vuoi"	13	2
4	Géraldine	"Quel coeur vas-tu briser ?"	32	1
5	Elisa Gabbai	"Abendwind"	3	6
6	Anita Traversi	"Non pensiamoci più"	6	4

=== Releases ===
"Quel coeur vas-tu briser ?" by Géraldine was recorded and released on an EP under the same title in 1967. A Spanish version of the song titled "¿Que Corazon Romperas?" was later released in Spain that same year. In 1998, the song was featured in a CD compilation titled "Concours Eurovision De La Chanson 1956-1998: Schweizer Beiträge", which compiled every Swiss Eurovision entry at the time.

Apart from the winning song, the only other song from the selection that was recorded and released commercially was "Farò come vuoi" by Milena, which appeared on a single titled "Faro' Come Vuoi / Guai, Guai!" in 1967. A recording of "Non pensiamoci più" by Anita Traversi has been preserved in the Swiss National Sound Archives.

== At Eurovision ==
At the Eurovision Song Contest 1967 in Vienna, the Swiss entry was the sixth song of the night following Portugal and preceding Sweden. The Swiss entry was conducted by Hans Moeckel, who also conducted all of the songs in the national final. At the close of voting, Switzerland had received nul points, and the country finished last place among the seventeen participants.

The contest was broadcast on SRG SSR via TV DRS and Radio Bern (Note: Delayed broadcast on 11 April 1967 at 22:15 (CET)) in German-speaking Switzerland, TSR and Radio Genève (with commentary from Robert Burnier) in Romandy, and TSI in Ticino.

=== Voting ===
Each participating broadcaster assembled a ten-member jury panel. Every jury member could give one vote to their favourite song.

Switzerland did not receive any votes in the contest.

Votes awarded by Switzerland
Score	Country
7 votes	United Kingdom
1 votes	France; Italy; Portugal
