= Madalena Iglésias =

Portuguese actress and singer

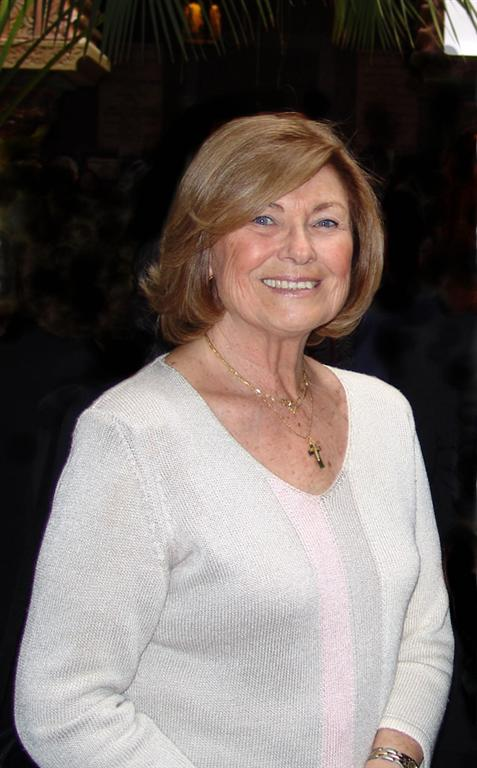
- Madalena Iglésias in 2010
- Born: Madalena Lucília Iglésias Doval; 24 October 1939; Santa Catarina, Lisbon, Portugal
- Died: 16 January 2018 (aged 78); Barcelona, Spain
- Other names: Madalena Lucília Iglésias do Vale de Oliveira
- Occupations: Actress, singer

Madalena Iglésias (24 October 1939 – 16 January 2018) was a Portuguese actress and singer. She represented Portugal at the Eurovision Song Contest 1966, with the song "Ele e ela".

== Biography ==
Madalena Lucília Iglésias Doval was born in the Santa Catarina neighborhood of Lisbon on 24 October 1939. She studied at the Conservatory and the School of Singing, and at the age of 15, she joined the Rádio e Televisão de Portugal's Center for Radio Artist Training, under the direction of Motta Pereira.

She died on January 16, 2018, in a clinic in Barcelona, Spain, at the age of 78.

== Career ==
Iglésias made her public debut in 1954 on both television and the national radio. Her international career began in 1959 with an appearance on Spanish television. In 1960, she was named "Queen of Radio and Television" in Portugal.

She participated in numerous national and international music festivals. In 1962, she represented Portugal at the Benidorm Festival. Two years later, she competed in the Festival da Canção with the songs "Balada das Palavras Perdidas" and "Na Tua Carta", placing fifth and tenth, respectively. That same year, she won the Spanish-Portuguese Festival of Aranda de Duero.

In 1966, Iglésias won the Festival da Canção with the song "Ele e Ela", written by Carlos Canelhas. She subsequently represented Portugal in the Eurovision Song Contest 1966 in Luxembourg, performing eighth in the running order and placing 13th with six points—the country's best result at the time. The song was later released in Spanish as "Él y Ella" and issued in Spain, France, and the Netherlands.

In the same year, she placed second at the Mediterranean Song Festival with "September" and won the Prémio da Hispanidade (Hispanic Prize) for the song "Vuelo 502". She was awarded the 1966 Casa da Imprensa prize the following year.

Iglésias was one of the most prominent voices of nacional-cançonetismo, a musical style that emphasized Portuguese cultural identity and was widely popular during the 1960s. Her repertoire included recordings with the Tecla label (owned by Jorge Costa Pinto) and a retrospective compilation issued by Movieplay in the series O Melhor dos Melhores.

== Filmography ==
- Uma hora de Amor (1964)
- Canção da Saudade (1964)
- Sarilho de fraldas (1966)

Preceded by Simone de Oliveira with Sol de inverno	Portugal in the Eurovision Song Contest; 1966	Succeeded by Eduardo Nascimento with O vento mudou
