= Luxembourg in the Eurovision Song Contest 1967 =

- Eurovision Song Contest 1967
- Participating broadcaster: Compagnie Luxembourgeoise de Télédiffusion (CLT)
- Country: Luxembourg
- Selection process: Internal selection
- Announcement date: 3 February 1967

Competing entry
- Song: "L'amour est bleu"
- Artist: Vicky
- Songwriters: André Popp; Pierre Cour

Placement
- Final result: 4th, 17 votes

Participation chronology

Luxembourg was represented at the Eurovision Song Contest 1967 with the song "L'amour est bleu", composed by André Popp, with lyrics by Pierre Cour, and performed by Vicky. The Luxembourgish participating broadcaster, the Compagnie Luxembourgeoise de Télédiffusion (CLT), selected its entry through an internal selection.

== Before Eurovision ==
=== Internal selection ===
Compagnie Luxembourgeoise de Télédiffusion (CLT) held an internal selection to select its entry for the Eurovision Song Contest 1967. About 24 songs were submitted to eight jurors in CLT consisting of Geoffrey Everitt, Gust Graas, Jean Roderès, Stoll, Ray Van Cant, Don Wardell, and two television producers. Among the known participants were Chris Baldo— who performed two submitted songs and Vicky— who performed six submitted songs. Among Vicky's songs was "Je vous aimes", which was eliminated by jurors due to sounding similar to another song.

After several hours of listening to and eliminating submissions, only two songs remained in the final round— Vicky with "L'amour est bleu" and Chris Baldo with an unknown song. On 3 February 1967, it was first reported that the jury selected "L'amour est bleu", written by André Popp, composed by Pierre Cour, and performed by Vicky to compete in Eurovision.

=== Controversy ===
The jury's decision to select Vicky to enter Eurovision was met wth criticism from Luxembourgish press. Many reporters complained that Vicky, a foreigner was chosen over Chris Baldo, a Luxembourgish native who lost in the final round of the selection, as well as the fact that CLT almost always chose foreign performers to represent Luxembourg in the contest.

To compensate for Baldo's rejection to Eurovision, he was swiftly chosen to represent Luxembourg at the Sopot International Song Festival 1967 with the songs "Quand vas-tu venir" and "Nostalgie". He would go on to represent Luxembourg in the Eurovision Song Contest 1968.

== At Eurovision ==
At the Eurovision Song Contest 1967 in Vienna, the Luxembourgish entry was the second song of the night following the Netherlands and preceding Austria. The Luxembourgish entry was conducted by Claude Denjean. At the close of voting, Luxembourg had received 17 votes, and the country finished fourth place among the seventeen participants.

=== Voting ===
Each participating broadcaster assembled a ten-member jury panel. Every jury member could give one point to their favourite song. The Luxembourgish jury met in Villa Louvigny and was composed of seven journalists, two disc jockeys, and a television script supervisor.

Known members of the jury include:

- Paul Ulveling – musicologist (chairperson)
- Chris Baldo – singer; represented Luxembourg in 1968
- Camillo Felgen – singer; represented Luxembourg in 1960 and 1962
- John Fisch – journalist for Tageblatt

Votes awarded to Luxembourg
Score	Country
4 votes	Netherlands
3 votes	Italy
2 votes	Finland; Ireland; United Kingdom
1 vote	Belgium; Monaco; Spain; Yugoslavia

Votes awarded by Luxembourg
Score	Country
5 votes	United Kingdom
2 votes	France
1 vote	Ireland; Spain; Yugoslavia

== After Eurovision ==
"L'amour est bleu" would go on to become an international success. Vicky's releases appeared in weekly charts across Europe and in Canada and Japan from 1967 to 1968 with moderate success. Vicky's version peaked at number 15 in Japanese charts.

Despite the success from Vicky's original release, the song achieved greater success through covers from other musicians. A notable example is Paul Mauriat's instrumental orchestral cover, who topped in charts worldwide. In 1968, Mauriat's cover peaked at number one in weekly charts in Australia, Malaysia, South Africa, and the United States.

The song would appear in the Eurovision Song Contest a few more times. In the semifinal of 2006 contest, it was performed in a medley of various other Eurovision songs. In the first semifinal of the 2026 contest— the contest's seventieth edition, Vicky performed the song herself as part of the opening act.
