= Netherlands in the Eurovision Song Contest 1967 =

- Eurovision Song Contest 1967
- Participating broadcaster: Nederlandse Televisie Stichting (NTS)
- Country: Netherlands
- Selection process: Artist: Internal selection Song: Nationaal Songfestival 1967
- Announcement date: 1 March 1967

Competing entry
- Song: "Ring-dinge-ding"
- Artist: Thérèse Steinmetz
- Songwriters: Johnny Holshuyzen; Gerrit den Braber

Placement
- Final result: 14th, 2 points

Participation chronology

The Netherlands was represented at the Eurovision Song Contest 1967 with the song "Ring-dinge-ding", composed by Johnny Holshuyzen, with lyrics by Gerrit den Braber, and performed by Thérèse Steinmetz. The Dutch participating Broadcaster, Nederlandse Televisie Stichting (NTS), selected its entry through a national final, after having previously selected the performer internally.

== Before Eurovision ==
=== Nationaal Songfestival 1967 ===
The national final was hosted by Leo Nelissen on 22 February from the Kloosterhoeve in Harmelen, the smallest town ever to play host to a Dutch final. The winning song was chosen by postcard voting, and on 1 March, this time from the Theater Orpheus in Apeldoorn, Steinmetz performed all six songs again before the results of the vote were announced. "Ring-dinge-ding" turned out to be the easy winner by a margin of well over 2,000 votes.

22 February 1967
R/O	Song	Votes	Place
1	"Waar ben je"	1,509	4
2	"Tornado"	422	6
3	"Sta stil bij mij"	1,304	5
4	"Zing"	3,231	2
5	"Hoor"	2,704	3
6	"Ring-dinge-ding"	5,550	1

== At Eurovision ==
On the night of the final Steinmetz performed first in the running order, preceding Luxembourg. At the close of voting "Ring-dinge-ding" had received only 2 points (1 each from Ireland and the United Kingdom), placing the Netherlands joint 14th (with Austria and Norway) of the 17 entries, ahead only of the zero points entry from Switzerland. This continued the string of bad results the Netherlands had suffered throughout the 1960s. However the song has remained quite well remembered, as it is often cited as one of the classic examples of the facile "ring-ding-bang-boom" school of bouncy Eurovision songs particularly prevalent in the 1960s and 1970s.

The Dutch conductor at the contest was Dolf van der Linden.

=== Voting ===
Points awarded to the Netherlands
Score	Country
1 point	Ireland; United Kingdom

Points awarded by the Netherlands
Score	Country
4 points	Luxembourg
2 points	United Kingdom
1 point	Finland; France; Spain; Norway
