= Minouche Barelli =

French and Monégasque singer

Mary-Pierre Barelli (13 December 1947 – 20 February 2004), better known as Minouche Barelli, was a French singer. She represented Monaco in the Eurovision Song Contest 1967.

Barelli was born in Paris, the daughter of singer Lucienne Delyle and jazz musician Aimé Barelli.

In 23–25 June 1966 Barelli took part in the Rose de France song festival in Antibes, which is also known as Rose d'Or music festival. She performed "Goualante 67" from her newly released EP. Barelli was one of 30 participants and she did not manage to take the winning place. First place went to Jacqueline Dulac. Second place went to Line and Willy who represented Monaco at Eurovision 1968,

She represented Monaco in the Eurovision Song Contest 1967 with the song "Boum-Badaboum", written by Serge Gainsbourg, and conducted on the night by her father. Barelli was the only artist participating for Monaco in Eurovision who ever lived in Monaco or had Monegasque citizenship, although she received this first 35 years after her participation. The song finished in fifth place of 17 entries.

In 1980 Barelli took part in the selection process for the French Eurovision entry with the song "Viens dans ma farandole", which only finished sixth in the second semi-final.

Barelli, a long-time announcer for Radio Montmartre, took out Monegasque citizenship in 2002, and died in the principality on 20 February 2004 at the age of 56.

Preceded by Tereza	Monaco in the Eurovision Song Contest; 1967	Succeeded by Line & Willy
