= Sean Dunphy =

Irish singer

Sean Dunphy (30 November 1937 – 17 May 2011) was an Irish singer. He represented Ireland at the Eurovision Song Contest 1967, achieving second place with "If I Could Choose". He was also the first Irish singer to record in Nashville.

== Career ==
Born in Whitehall, Dublin, Dunphy first became famous in his home country as lead singer with the Hoedowners, a showband led by trumpeter Earl Gill. Between 1966 and 1973, fourteen singles by Sean Dunphy and The Hoedowners entered the Irish charts, including in 1969 two number ones: "Lonely Woods of Upton" and "When The Fields Were White With Daisies".

In 1968, the Irish independent record label Dolphin Records' first issue was a single by Dunphy titled "Two Loves". The Cork Examiner states that it was a number one hit in Ireland; however, the song does not feature in the list of number-one singles of 1968 in Ireland.

In the late 1970s, Dunphy went on to have two further hits as a solo artist.

Despite undergoing a quadruple heart bypass operation in 2007, Sean Dunphy continued to give live performances. In March 2009, he sang many of his greatest hits in a one-off concert at Dublin's National Concert Hall. His last public engagement was at a charity event twenty-four hours before his death.

On May 17, 2011, Dunphy died at his home in Baldoyle, County Dublin. He is buried at Greenogue cemetery in Ashbourne, County Meath.

Sean Dunphy and his wife Lily had four children. His son Brian is a member of Irish band the High Kings.

== Discography ==
=== Sean Dunphy and the Hoedowners ===
Year	Single	Chart Positions
Year	Single	IRE
1966	"Wonderful World of My Dreams"	3
1966	"Showball Crazy"	2
1967	"4033"	17
1967	"If I Could Choose"	2
1967	"Talking Love"	13
1968	"Two Loves"	2
1968	"Christmas Polka"	2
1969	"Lonely Woods of Upton"	1
1969	"When the Fields Were White with Daisies"	1
1970	"The Old Fenian Gun"	5
1970	"The Old Refrain"	19
1972	"There's an Island in the Sun"	10
1972	"Michael Collins"	12
1973	"Pal of My Cradle Days"	3

=== Sean Dunphy solo ===
Year	Single	Chart Positions		
Year	Single	CAN Country	CAN AC	IRE
1972	"Fields of Green"	—	3	—
1972	"And the Old House Died"	47	—	—
1972	"The Great White Horse"	23	—	—
1977	"Santa Claus Is Coming Tonight"	—	—	14
1979	"Rosie"	—	—	30

Awards and achievements
Preceded by Dickie Rock with "Come Back to Stay"	Ireland in the Eurovision Song Contest; 1967	Succeeded by Pat McGeegan with "Chance of a Lifetime"
