= Norway in the Eurovision Song Contest 1967 =

- Eurovision Song Contest 1967
- Participating broadcaster: Norsk rikskringkasting (NRK)
- Country: Norway
- Selection process: Melodi Grand Prix 1967
- Selection date: 25 February 1967

Competing entry
- Song: "Dukkemann"
- Artist: Kirsti Sparboe
- Songwriters: Tor Hultin; Ola B. Johannessen

Placement
- Final result: 14th, 2 points

Participation chronology

Norway was represented at the Eurovision Song Contest 1967 with the song "Dukkemann", composed by Tor Hultin, with lyrics by Ola B. Johannessen, and performed by Kirsti Sparboe. The Norwegian participating broadcaster, Norsk rikskringkasting (NRK), organised the national final Melodi Grand Prix 1967 in order to select its entry for the contest. This was the second of Sparboe's three Eurovision appearances for Norway.

== Before Eurovision ==
=== Melodi Grand Prix 1967 ===
Norsk rikskringkasting (NRK) held the Melodi Grand Prix 1967 at Centralteatret in Oslo, hosted by Jan Voigt. Ten performers and five songs took part in the final with each song sung twice by different singers, once with a small combo and once with a full orchestra. The winning song was chosen by voting from ten regional juries.

MGP - 25 February 1967
R/O	Combo	Orchestra	Song	Points	Place
1	Laila Granum	Bente Aaseth	"Shake"	14	2
2	Torill Ravnås	Kirsti Sparboe	"Dukkemann"	24	1
3	Randi & Torill	Kari & Iva Medaas	"Jeg vet om en gutt/jente"	1	5
4	Karin Krog	Per Asplin	"Veslefrikk"	5	4
5	Torill Støa	Solfrid Heier	"Skitur"	6	3

== At Eurovision ==
On the evening of the final Sparboe performed 13th in the running order, following Spain and preceding Monaco. Each national jury had 10 points to distribute between the songs, and at the close "Dukkemann" had picked up 2 points (1 each from the Netherlands and Sweden), placing Norway joint 14th (with Austria and the Netherlands) of the 17 entries. The Norwegian jury awarded 7 of its 10 points to contest winners the United Kingdom.

=== Voting ===
Points awarded to Norway
Score	Country
1 point	Netherlands; Sweden

Points awarded by Norway
Score	Country
7 points	United Kingdom
2 points	Sweden
1 point	Germany
