= Eduardo Nascimento =

Angolan singer (1943–2019)

- Born: 26 June 1943; Luanda, Portuguese Angola
- Died: 22 November 2019 (aged 76) Lisbon, Portugal
- Genres: Pop
- Occupation: Singer

Eduardo Nascimento (26 June 1943 – 22 November 2019) was an Angolan singer. He represented Portugal in the Eurovision Song Contest 1967.

Nascimento was the leader of a five-member band, Os Rocks, formed in Luanda in 1962. The band travelled to mainland Portugal in the mid-1960s, participating in song festivals and releasing a well-received EP, "Wish I May", in 1966. In 1967, Nascimento entered the Portuguese Eurovision selection contest, the Festival da Canção, as a solo artist with the song "O vento mudou" ("The Wind Changed"). He won the event by a comfortable margin, and went forward to represent Portugal in the Eurovision Song Contest 1967, held on 8 April in Vienna, where "O vento mudou" finished in joint 12th place of the 17 entries. With Os Rocks, Nascimento released another EP, "Don't Blame Me", in 1968, before giving up his musical career and returning to Angola in 1969.

Nascimento is notable for being the first black male performer at Eurovision, the year after Milly Scott from the Netherlands became the first black female to sing at the Eurovision.

Nascimento died on 22 November 2019.

Awards and achievements
Preceded by Madalena Iglesias with "Ele e ela"	Portugal in the Eurovision Song Contest; 1967	Succeeded by Carlos Mendes with "Verão"
