= Peter Horton (guitarist) =

Austrian guitarist, singer, and writer (1941–2023)

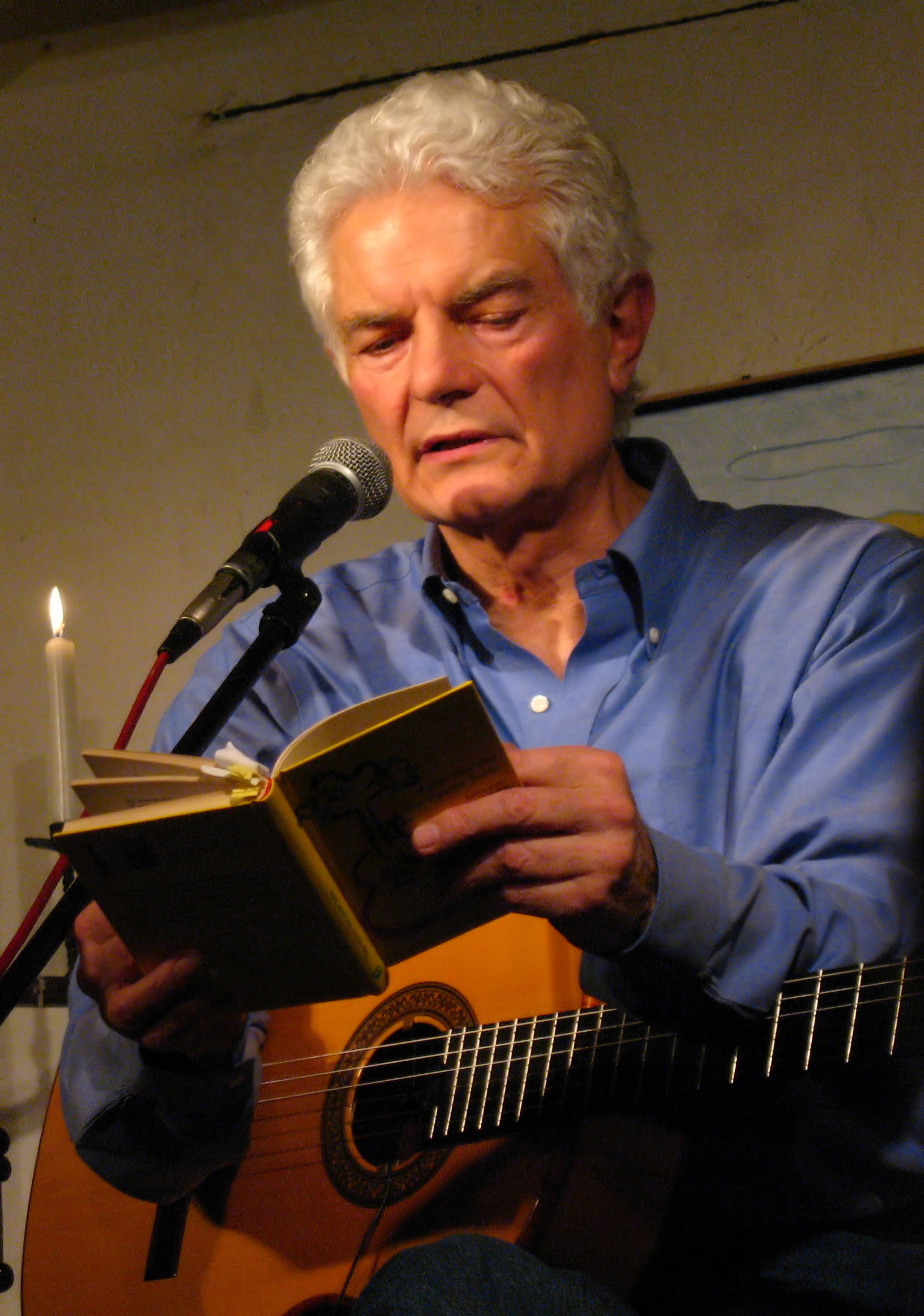
- Horton in 2015
- Born: Peter Müller; 19 September 1941; Feldsberg, Reichsgau Niederdonau, Germany
- Died: 22 September 2023 (aged 82)
- Education: Conservatory of Vienna
- Occupations: Guitarist; singer; writer

Peter Müller (19 September 1941 – 22 September 2023), better known by the stage name Peter Horton, was an Austrian guitarist, singer, composer, and writer, noted for representing Austria at the Eurovision Song Contest 1967 with the song "Warum es hunderttausend Sterne gibt". The song scored 2 points to finish joint 14th place out of 17 entries.

Horton died from Parkinson's disease in September 2023, shortly after his 82nd birthday.

== Discography ==
=== Studio albums ===
- Zwischen Himmel und Erde (1970)
- Intercontinental (1971)
- Horton's Erzählungen (1972)
- Irgendwie geht es immer (1975)
- Solang du in dir selber nicht zuhause bist (1975)
- Ein Mann geht auf dem Asphalt (1976)
- Lieder, die wie Falken sind (1978)
- Will Deine Seele mit Dir singen (1979)
- Vierzig Jahre Leben (1981)
- Komm näher (1984)
- Guitarero (1985)
- Im Dezember des Jahrtausends (1985)
- Oceans Inside / Meditative Musik für Gitarre und Synth. (2001)
- Wild Silence / Meditative Musik für Gitarre und Synth. (2001)
- Loving Hands / Meditative Musik für Gitarre und Synth. (2001)
- Wilde Gärten (2007)
- Personalissimo (2011)
- Winterflüstern (2011)
- Guitarissimo XL (2014)

=== Live albums ===
- Live – Schmunzellieder aus Wien (1977)
- Wer andern nie ein Feuer macht (1983)

=== Compilations ===
- Liederbuch (1976)

=== Singles ===
- "Das tut meine Mary nie" (1964)
- "Warum es hunderttausend Sterne gibt" (1967)
- "Perché le stelle" (1967)
- "Das kann uns nicht passieren" (1968)
- "Land so wunderbar" (1968)
- "Was geschieht" (1969)
- "He-Ho-Ho-A-He" (1970)
- "Den Schlüssel hast du" (1970)
- "Caroline" (1970)
- "Mrs. Robinson" (1971)
- "Wer hat den Eiffelturm geklaut?" (1972)
- "Es ist uns're Welt" (1972)
- "Wann komt der Morgen" (1972)
- "Der Kartendippler-Blues" (1972)
- "Komm in die Laube" (1973)
- "Ich kann machen was ich will" (1974)
- "Wenn du nichts hast als die Liebe" (1975)
- "Ein Schiff wird kommen" (1975)
- "Solang du in dir selber nicht zuhause bist" (1975)
- "Ich suchte wilde Rosen" (1976)
