= Thérèse Steinmetz =

Dutch singer

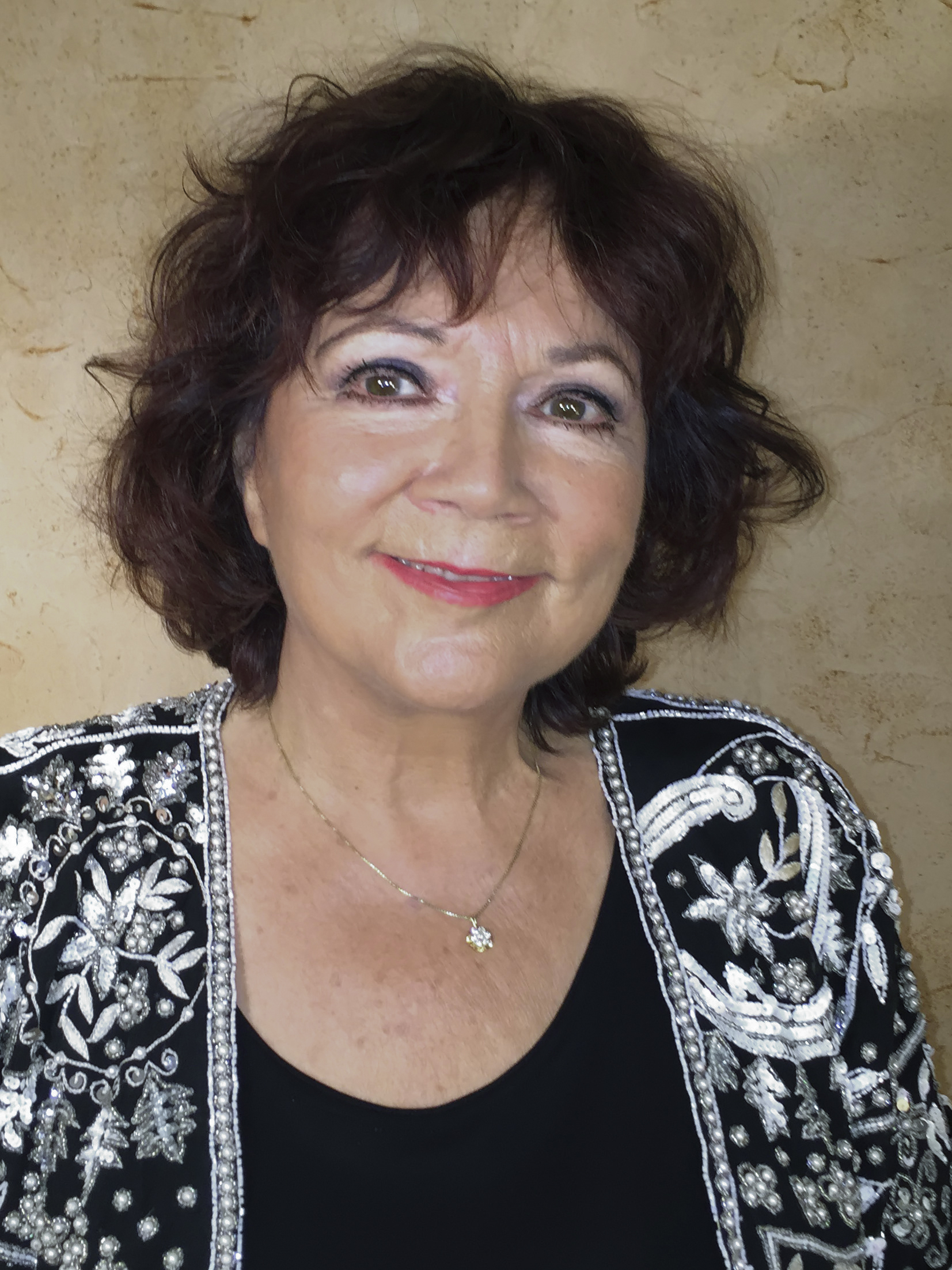
- Steinmetz in 2015

Background information
- Born: 17 May 1933 (age 93); Amsterdam, Netherlands
- Genres: Pop
- Occupations: Singer; painter

Thérèse Steinmetz (born 17 May 1933) is a Dutch singer, best known for her participation in the Eurovision Song Contest 1967.

== Career ==
=== Early career ===
Steinmetz studied at the Conservatorium van Amsterdam, and appeared in various theatre, television and film roles before being given her own TV series, Thérèse, in 1966

=== Eurovision Song Contest ===
In 1967, Steinmetz sang all six songs in the Dutch Eurovision selection, with "Ring-dinge-ding" being chosen by postcard voting as the winner. Steinmetz went forward to the 12th Eurovision Song Contest, held in Vienna on 8 April, where "Ring-dinge-ding" ended the evening in 14th place of 17 entries, continuing a run of poor Dutch results dating back to 1960.

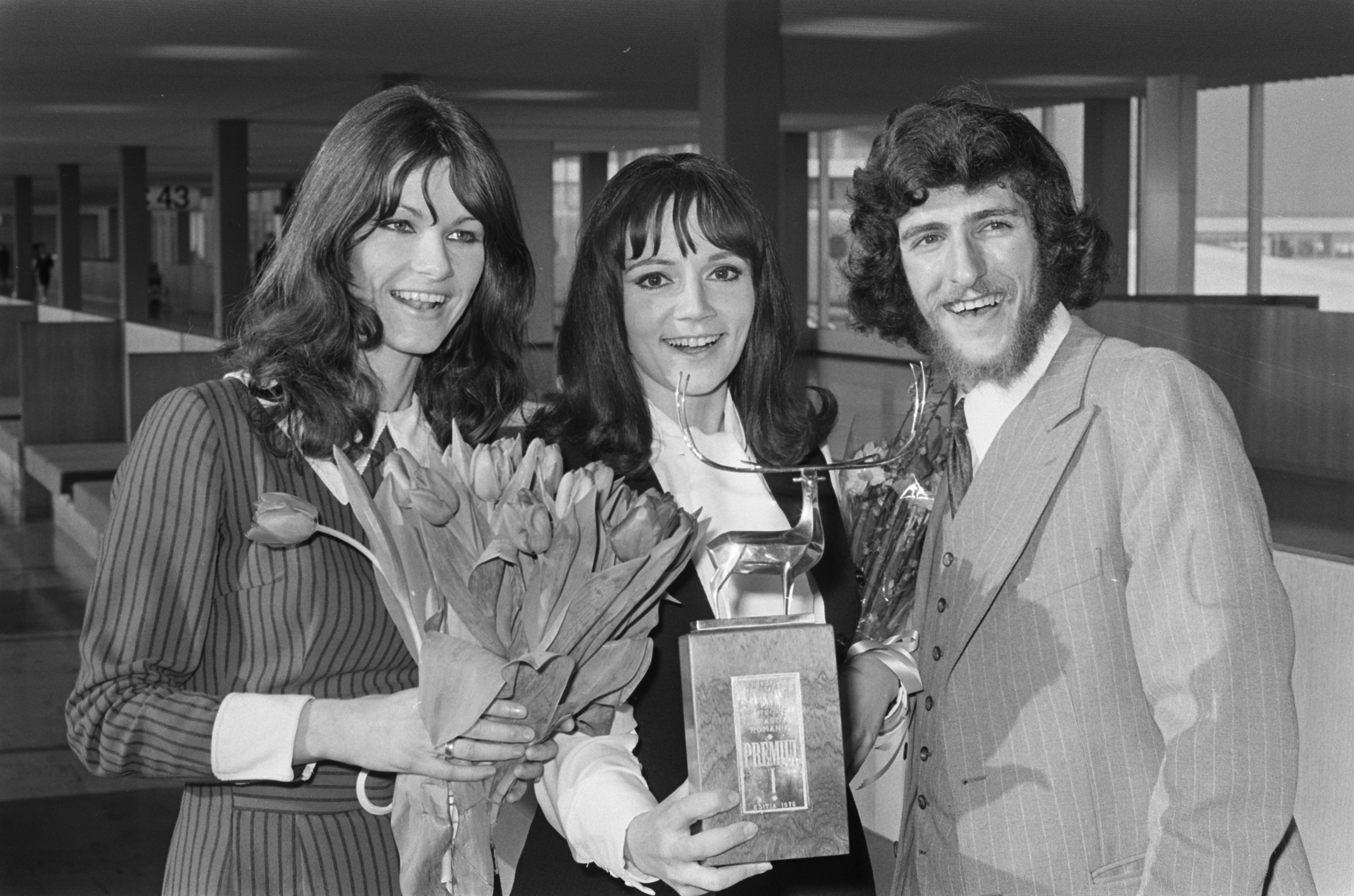
Steinmetz (centre) with the Golden Stag award in 1970

=== Later career ===
In 1970, Steinmetz won the Golden Stag Festival in Braşov, Romania, beating another former Eurovision singer, Lize Marke, into second place. The victory led to her becoming a popular singer in Romania, which she would visit several times, performing a folk music-based repertoire. She had a Top 40 hit, "Geef ze een kans", in the Netherlands in 1974 and made regular television appearances.

Steinmetz has lived for many years in the French Riviera city of Cannes, where she has become a painter and owns and runs an art gallery and workshop.

Awards and achievements
Preceded by Milly Scott with "Fernando en Filippo"	Netherlands in the Eurovision Song Contest; 1967	Succeeded by Ronnie Tober with "Morgen"
