= Marcos Paulo =

Marcos Paulo is a masculine Portuguese given name. Notable people with the name include:

- Marcos Paulo Alves (born 1977), Brazilian footballer
- Marcos Paulo Gelmini Gomes (born 1988), Brazilian footballer
- Marcos Paulo Souza Ribeiro, known as Marcos, (born 1974), Brazilian footballer
- Marcos Paulo Aguiar de Jesus, known as Pepe, (born 1983), Brazilian footballer
- Marcos Paulo Segobe da Silva, known as Careca, (born 1980), Brazilian footballer
- Marcos Paulo Simões (1951–2012), Brazilian actor
- Marcos Paulo (footballer, born 2001), Portuguese-Brazilian footballer
- Marcos Paulo (footballer, born 2003), Marcos Paulo Lima Batista Silva, Brazilian football left-back

== See also ==
- Marcos (disambiguation)
- Paulo
- Marco Paulo
- Paulo Marcos de Jesus Ribeiro, (born 1986), Brazilian footballer
