= Spain in the Eurovision Song Contest 1967 =

- Eurovision Song Contest 1967
- Participating broadcaster: Televisión Española (TVE)
- Country: Spain
- Selection process: Internal selection
- Announcement date: Artist: 24 January 1967; Song: 1 March 1967

Competing entry
- Song: "Hablemos del amor"
- Artist: Raphael
- Songwriter: Manuel Alejandro

Placement
- Final result: 6th, 9 votes

Participation chronology

Spain was represented at the Eurovision Song Contest 1967 with the song "Hablemos del amor", written by Manuel Alejandro, and performed by Raphael. The Spanish participating broadcaster, Televisión Española (TVE), internally selected its entry for the contest. Raphael had already represented Spain in 1966 with "Yo soy aquél". "Hablemos del amor", performed in position 12, placed sixth out of seventeen competing entries with 9 votes.

== Before Eurovision ==
Televisión Española (TVE) internally selected "Hablemos del amor" performed by Raphael as its entry for the Eurovision Song Contest 1967. The song was composed by Manuel Alejandro. The broadcaster announced Raphael as the performer on 24 January 1967. Los Brincos and Bruno Lomas had also been under consideration. The song title, songwriter, and lyrics were published on 8 February. TVE aired the song for the first time on 1 March. Raphael also recorded the song in English as "Please speak to me of love".

== At Eurovision ==
On 8 April 1967, the Eurovision Song Contest was held at the Großer Festsaal der Wiener Hofburg in Vienna hosted by Österreichischer Rundfunk (ORF), and broadcast live throughout the continent. Raphael performed "Hablemos del amor" 12th in the evening, following the United Kingdom and preceding Norway. Manuel Alejandro conducted the event's orchestra performance of the Spanish entry. At the close of voting Raphael had received 9 votes, placing 6th in a field of 17.

TVE broadcast the contest in Spain on TVE 1 and TVE Canarias (Note: Deferred broadcast on TVE Canarias the following day at 23:00 (WET)) with commentary by José Luis Uribarri. Before the event, TVE aired a talk show hosted by Jesús Álvarez introducing the Spanish jury from Prado del Rey, which continued after the contest commenting on the results.

=== Voting ===
TVE assembled a jury panel with ten members. The following members comprised the Spanish jury:

- María Teresa Salisachs – socialite
- Gemma Cuervo – actress
- Ana Diosdado – actress
- Rafael Ramos Losada
- Juan Munsó Cabús
- Juan Bautista Martí Belda – president of the Junta Central Fallera
- Ferenc Puskás – football player
- Emiliano Rodríguez – basketball player
- Pablito Calvo – actor
- Joaquín Pérez Navarro – captain of the winning team on the previous Cesta y puntos

The spokesperson who announced the Spanish votes was Margarita Nicola.

Votes awarded to Spain
Score	Country
2 votes	Monaco; Portugal
1 vote	Austria; Belgium; Luxembourg; Netherlands; Yugoslavia

Votes awarded by Spain
Score	Country
5 votes	Monaco
2 votes	Yugoslavia
1 vote	Italy; Luxembourg; Portugal
