= Inge Brück =

German singer and actress (1936–2025)

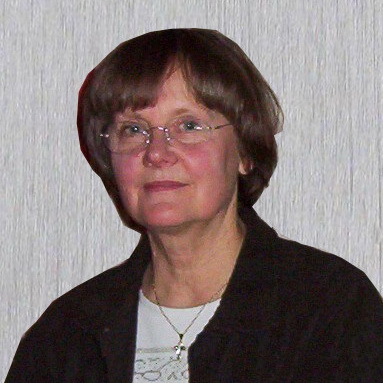
- Brück in 2004

Background information
- Born: 12 October 1936; Mannheim, Gau Baden, Germany
- Died: 8 September 2025 (aged 88)
- Occupation: Singer

Inge Brück (12 October 1936 – 8 September 2025) was a German singer and actress, best known internationally for her participation in the Eurovision Song Contest 1967. She starred in the title role of a popular 13-part series for ZDF, Miss Molly Mill, a cleaning lady and amateur detective. From the 1970s, she focused on performing songs with Christian content, co-founding with other Eurovision veterans such as Katja Ebstein an initiative Künstler für Christus.

== Life and career ==
Brück was born in Mannheim on 12 October 1936; Her father was a concert singer and her mother a pianist. She took acting lessons and began her singing career with the Erwin Lehn Dance Orchestra, where she was noticed by pianist Horst Jankowski, who arranged a television appearance with Hans-Joachim Kulenkampff, following which she was offered a recording contract. In 1957, she had a hit with "Peter, komm heut' abend zum Hafen", a version of "Green Door", which reached No. 7 in the German chart. In the late 1950s and early 1960s, she made numerous TV appearances, appeared in stage musicals and toured with orchestras including those of Jankowski and Hazy Osterwald. Following a 1966 victory in an International Song Festival in Brazil, Brück was selected by broadcaster NDR to be the German representative in the 1967 Eurovision Song Contest. The chosen song "Anouschka" was internally selected by the channel. Brück went forward to the 12th Eurovision, held on 8 April in Vienna, where "Anouschka" finished in joint eighth place of the 17 entries.

Following her Eurovision appearance, Brück decided to concentrate on acting, and in 1970 she starred in a 13-part series for ZDF called Miss Molly Mill in which she played the title role, a cleaning lady/amateur detective, which was a ratings hit and regularly drew audiences of over 20 million. She performed the theme song, of the series which was later released as a single.

From the 1970s, Brück focused on performing songs with Christian content. Along with fellow Eurovision veterans Katja Ebstein and Peter Horton, she was a founder and member of the initiative Künstler für Christus (Artists For Christ). The group toured to churches and festivals, and released a double album.

Brück was married to Michael Pfleghar, a television director. She was later married to Klaus Überall, but the marriage ended in divorce. She lived in Meschede.

Brück died on 8 September 2025, at the age of 88.

Preceded by Margot Eskens with Die Zeiger der Uhr	Germany in the Eurovision Song Contest; 1967	Succeeded by Wenche Myhre with Ein Hoch der Liebe
