= Elisa Gabbai =

Elisa Gabbai אליסה גבאי
- Born: December 31, 1933; Tel Aviv, Israel
- Died: December 14, 2010 (aged 76); Los Angeles
- Genres: Schlager, Cabaret songs, Jazz
- Occupation: Singer
- Years active: 1951–1975, 1998

Elisa Gabbai (Hebrew: אליסה גבאי) was an Israeli singer who became famous in the late 1960s. She interpreted songs in various languages, mainly in German but also in Hebrew. Her general genre is said to be Schlager.

== Biography ==
Elisa Gabbai's mother was an opera singer. Her father died very early in her life. She had her first small musical accomplishments in her homeland. In 1962, she shined in Israel with her first album containing 17 Israeli folk songs. In 1965, she became acknowledged as the singer of Switzerland, due to her extraordinary nightclub shows. There a music agent from Berlin heard her one night, with whom she signed a contract.

== Discography ==
- Songs of Old and New Tel Aviv (1953)
- A: Winter in Canada – B: Nach Tahiti, Hawaii und Jamaica (1966)
- A: Vorbei sind die Tränen – B: Was bin ich ohne dich (1966)
- A: Nur wenn du bei mir bist – B: Die Liebe ist ein Lied (1966)
- A: Zwei wie wir – B: Berge und Täler (1967)
- A: Mama – B: Meine kleine Minka (1967)
- A: Ein langes Leben lang – B: Tam-Tam-Tambourin (1967)
- A: Gar kein Problem – B: Laß die Träume (1968)
- במקצבים חדשים / New Rhythms (1968)
