= Ireland in the Eurovision Song Contest 1967 =

- Eurovision Song Contest 1967
- Participating broadcaster: Radio Telefís Éireann (RTÉ)
- Country: Ireland
- Selection process: National Song Contest
- Announcement date: 19 February 1967

Competing entry
- Song: "If I Could Choose"
- Artist: Sean Dunphy
- Songwriters: Michael Coffey; Wesley Burrowes

Placement
- Final result: 2nd, 22 points

Participation chronology

Ireland was represented at the Eurovision Song Contest 1967 with the song "If I Could Choose", composed by Michael Coffey, with lyrics by Wesley Burrowes, and performed by Sean Dunphy. It finished second in the contest which was won by the UK with "Puppet on a String" sung by Sandie Shaw and written by Phil Coulter from Derry and his songwriting partner Bill Martin. The Irish participating broadcaster, Radio Telefís Éireann (RTÉ), selected its entry through a national final.

== Before Eurovision ==
=== National Song Contest ===
==== Competing entries ====
Radio Telefís Éireann (RTÉ) asked thirty composers to submit entries, from which ten would be chosen to compete. RTÉ asked for songs with "a distinct Irish flavour with lyrics in Irish or English. Ultimately, only nine songs were chosen for the contest.

==== Final ====
The third edition of the National Song Contest was hosted by Brendan O'Reilly on 12 February 1967 at the television studios of RTÉ in Dublin. The winner was chosen by postcard voting and the results were revealed on 19 February 1967.

Final - 12 February 1967
R/O	Artist	Song	Songwriters	Votes	Place
1	Patricia Cahill	"Back to the Hills"	Sean Bonner	13,951	2
2	Johnny McEvoy	"Over the Hill"	Rick Walsh	2,920	5
3	Aedín Ní Choileáin	"Inisheer"	Gene Martin, Moira Moloney	457	8
4	Deirdre O'Callaghan	"The World Outside"	Bill Somerville-Large, Michael Bogdanov	1,182	7
5	Sean Dunphy	"If I Could Choose"	Wesley Burrowes, Michael Coffey	16,723	1
6	Patricia Cahill	"Canavaun"	Sheila Fawsitt-Stewart	3,172	4
7	Aedín Ní Choileáin	"Never More Be Leaving"	Bill Skinner, Carolyn Swift	1,677	6
8	Johnny McEvoy	"Somebody of My Own"	Jim Doherty	11,682	3
9	Deirdre O'Callaghan	"Far Away"	Ita Beausang	306	9

== At Eurovision ==
The contest was broadcast on RTÉ with commentary by Brendan O'Reilly, and on RTÉ Radio with commentary by Kevin Roche.

Ireland's song was the final song of the 17 entries performed in the contest (after Italy) and it finished in 2nd place with 22 points.

=== Voting ===
Points awarded to Ireland
Score	Country
4 points	Germany
3 points	Austria; Belgium
2 points	Finland; Monaco; Sweden; United Kingdom
1 point	Italy; Luxembourg; Portugal; Yugoslavia

Points awarded by Ireland
Score	Country
2 points	Luxembourg; Sweden
1 point	Belgium; France; Germany; Italy; Netherlands; United Kingdom
