= Géraldine Gogly =

French singer (born 1946)

Géraldine Gogly (born 18 April 1946 in Paris) is a French singer.

== Biography ==
She started her career in 1966 with the label Polydor, releasing a 45' EP La rivière me disait ("The river has said to me"). Guy Lux then invited her to perform in his show "Le Palmarès des chansons".

She has performed in the debut of Enrico Macias at L'Olympia. She represented Switzerland in the Eurovision Song Contest 1967 in Vienna with the song "Quel cœur vas-tu briser ?", finishing in last place with zero votes.

In 1968, she released another EP Les Chattes.
