= Lasse Mårtenson =

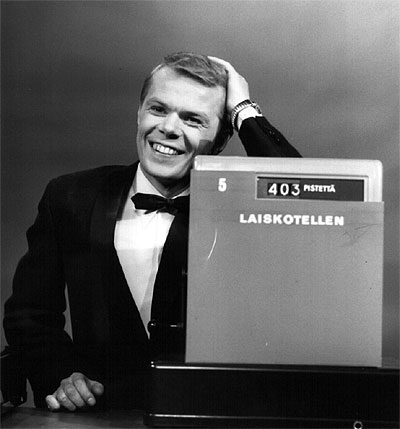
- Lasse Mårtenson after winning the Finnish national final in 1964

Background information
- Born: Lars Anders Fredrik Mårtenson; 24 September 1934; Helsinki, Finland
- Died: 14 May 2016 (aged 81) Espoo, Finland

Lars Anders Fredrik "Lasse" Mårtenson (24 September 1934 – 14 May 2016) was a Finnish singer, composer, actor, and theater conductor.

== Biography ==
Mårtenson was born in Helsinki. He grew up in a highly musical home; his father, Elis Mårtenson, was an organist and his mother Eini Mårtenson, née Stenfeldt, was a singing teacher. During the Continuation War, he was sent as a war child to Helgerum Castle in Västervik, Sweden, but returned to Helsinki in 1943. As a young man, Mårtenson devoted himself to jazz and won the soloist prize in an orchestral competition in 1949 and the jazz piano prize in the Nordic competition Ungdom med ton in 1952. Mårtenson formed his own trio, which he played in from 1952 to 1960.

He trained as a telegraph operator and then as an advertising illustrator. Parallel with his musical career, Mårtenson worked as an advertising illustrator at Stockmann's department store and for about twenty years as a freelance illustrator. Mårtenson initially played mainly in restaurants in Helsinki and at smaller events, until he met Vivica Bandler, who opened new doors for him in the world of theater. Mårtenson worked from 1956 to 1963 as a theatre conductor at the Lilla Teatern, Åbo Svenska Teater and the Swedish Theatre in Helsinki.

Mårtenson appeared as an actor in Å vilket härligt krig at the National Theatre in Sweden and as Henry Higgins in My Fair Lady at the Helsinki Operettiteatteri in 1970–1971. In 1972, Mårtenson also appeared in the television series Lehtori Musa where he played the lead role as a music lecturer.

He performed at the Eurovision Song Contest in 1964 with the song "Laiskotellen" ("Idling"), placing 7th with 9 points, and in 1967 he was the composer for "Varjoon – hooan", performed by Fredi.

He is best known in his home country as the composer of "Maija from the Storm Skerries", a lyrical tune arranged primarily for piano. His hits include the Finnish version of the song "Jackson" in duet with Carola Standertskjöld, which was included in the list of the songs played in the 2003 Men's World Ice Hockey Championships during the breaks.

Mårtenson's discography includes hits, ballads and music for television, film and theatre. He composed music for the musicals Smugglarkungen (1977 at the Swedish Theatre in Helsinki) and Prinsessan Törnrosa (1988) as well as for the films Den förtrollade vägen (1986) and Guldfeber i Lappland (1999). Mårtenson also ran the company Mårtensong Ab. Mårtenson was awarded the Svenska Kulturfonden's prize in 1989.

In 2011 he published his memoirs, Vågspel, in the Swedish language, and they were translated into Finnish in 2013.

Mårtenson was married four times: in 1956 to Carita Wilhelmsson, in 1963 to the Swedish singer Siw Malmkvist, in 1973 to Anna-Liisa Ehrnrooth, née Wallden, and in 1997 to Sari Angervo, née Varpukari. He died in Espoo in 2016, aged 81.

Preceded by Laila Halme with Muistojeni laulu	Finland in the Eurovision Song Contest; 1964	Succeeded by Viktor Klimenko with Aurinko laskee länteen
