= Marco Paulo =

Marco Paulo is a masculine Portuguese given name. Notable people with the name include:

- Marco Paulo Rebelo Lopes (born 1976), Angolan international footballer of Portuguese descent
- Marco Paulo Faria Lemos (born 1973), Portuguese footballer
- Marco Soares (football), full name Marco Paulo Silva Soares, Cape Verdean footballer
- Marco Abreu, full name Marco Paulo Coimbra Abreu, Angolan footballer
- Marco Paulo (singer), stage name of João Simão da Silva (1945–2024), Portuguese singer and television presenter

== See also ==
- Marco (given name)
- Paulo
- Marcos Paulo
