= Marcus Österdahl =

Swedish musical director and entrepreneur

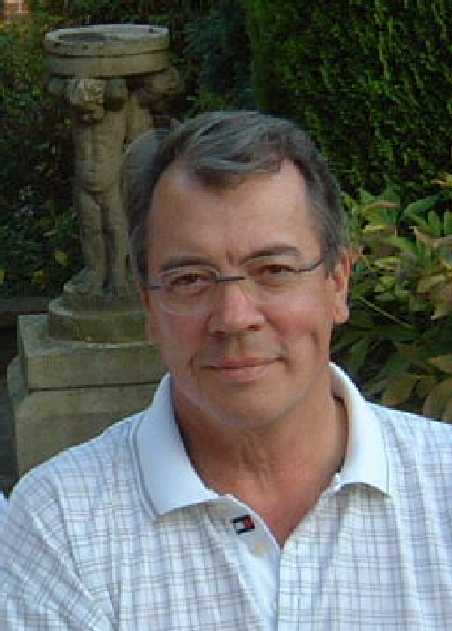
- Österdahl in 2003

Background information
- Born: 27 January 1943 (age 82); Stockholm, Sweden
- Genres: Jazz, pop, orchestral
- Occupation(s): Musician, songwriter, arranger, conductor, producer
- Instrument(s): Guitar, bass, piano
- Years active: 1959–1999

Marcus Österdahl (born 27 January 1943) is a Swedish musical director and entrepreneur.

== The Telstars ==
In 1963, Österdahl was one of the founder members of the Telstars, a pop-jazz group consisting of some of the most sought after session musicians in Sweden. They were the "house-band" in the monthly TV-Show Drop-In backing most artists in the show and were also the support act for the Beatles on their first tour of Sweden in 1963.

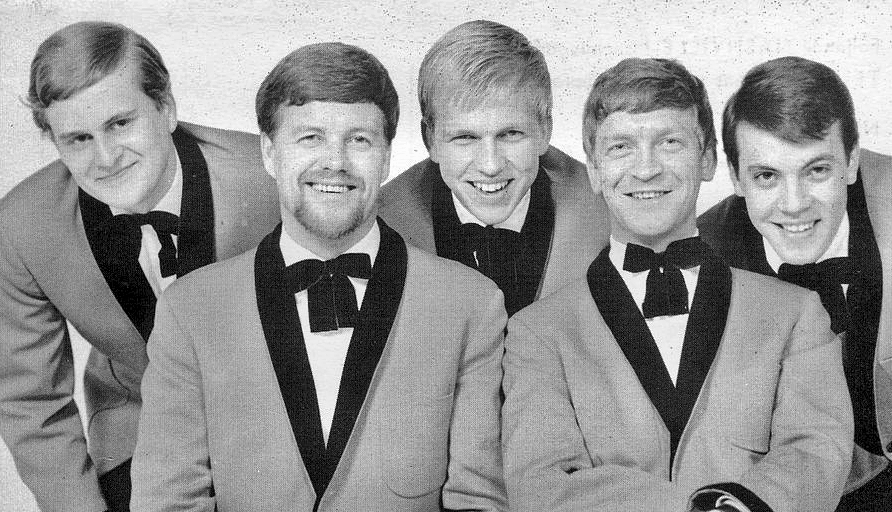
The Telstars in 1964 (pictured: Kjell Öhman, Gösta Nilsson, Douglas Westlund, Rolf Bäckman, Marcus Österdahl)

== Musical career ==
After leaving The Telstars in 1966, Österdahl mainly devoted his talent and time to working as an independent arranger/producer for the major record companies. Many well-known Swedish acts were accompanied by Marcus Österdahl's Choir & Orchestra, with about 30 tracks reaching number one on the charts.

Among Österdahl's hits as an arranger is "Du är den ende", the title track from singer Lill Lindfors' 1967 gold album. That same year, Marcus Österdahl composed, together with producer Curt Pettersson and lyricist Patrice Hellberg, the Swedish entry "Som en dröm" for the Eurovision Song Contest in Vienna.

Due to the constant demand for time in recording studios, Österdahl developed an interest in the business operation of these highly technical facilities and opened his first commercial recording studio in 1973. The independent studio, which was named Marcus Music, was equipped with the first 24-track tape recorder in Sweden and a few years later, the first computerised mixing desk in Scandinavia. ABBA were one of the many acts using the studio, recording most of ABBA – The Album at Marcus Music.

== Business development ==
Further associated business developments included an audio music cassette plant, a record label for new talent and publishing interests. By 1977 the Polygram Group offered to acquire the company, provided that Österdahl would accept a position as Head of A&R for the Nordic market. However, Österdahl planned to expand Marcus Music and decided to remain independent.

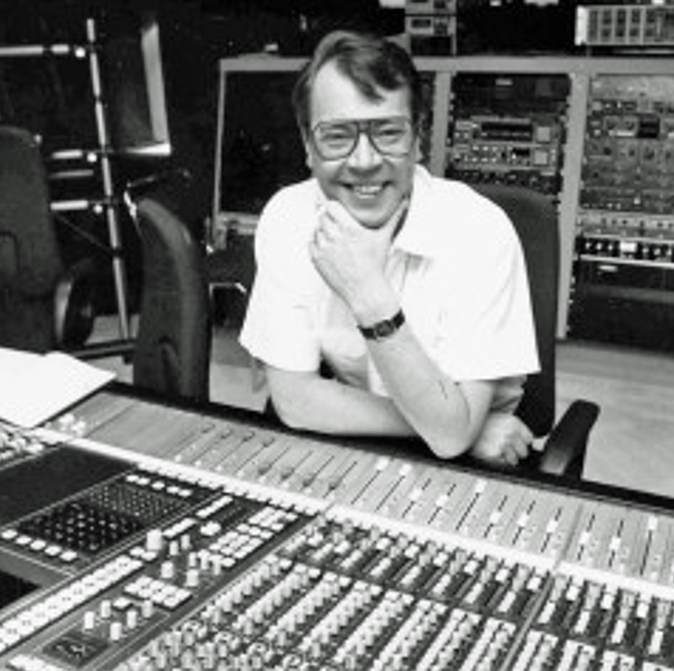
Marcus at London Studio ONE in 1990

The Swedish company established a UK subsidiary in 1978 and acquired the lease on the legendary CTS Studios off Westbourne Grove. It was a landmark home to most Star Wars and James Bond film scores, and Frank Sinatra recorded his 1962 album Sinatra Sings Great Songs from Great Britain in this studio. Following a substantial refurbishment of the premises, Marcus Recording Studios installed state-of-the-art equipment and the spacious Studio One featured the first 48-track facility in London.

Ten years later, the Virgin Group was expanding and Richard Branson invited Marcus Österdahl for lunch on his houseboat in Little Venice on 12 February 1988 to discuss the acquisition of Österdahl's business interests. Instead, Österdahl acquired a development property for a new studio complex in Fulham, West London. The purpose built facility provided for very different studios under the same roof and established the first residential London studio with a small hotel and licensed bar and restaurant for musicians, artists and their friends. The Swedish company was sold in 1981 to Soundtrade Studios and is a commercial recording complex in Stockholm.

In 1999 the Fulham studios were sold to Worldsport.com a start-up by Alan Callan, the former head of Led Zeppelin's Swan Song record label as well as Jimmy Page's business manager.

Marcus Österdahl Instrumentals, an orchestral double album from studio recordings produced and arranged in 1976/77 was released in 2023 for global streaming.
