= Pierre Cour =

French songwriter (1916–1995)

Pierre Cour (5 April 1916 – 22 December 1995) was a French songwriter who wrote songs for several generations of artists. He wrote a number of successful songs in the 1950s, 1960s and 1970s. Among those who recorded his songs are Dalida, Roger Whittaker, Petula Clark, Vicky Leandros, Paul Mauriat, Nana Mouskouri, Claudine Longet, German Montero, Jean-Claude Annoux and Enrico Macias.

In the 1960s, he co-wrote (with André Popp) three songs for the Eurovision Song Contest – "Tom Pillibi", which won the competition for France in 1960, "Le Chant de Mallory" which came fourth for France in 1964 and "L'Amour Est Bleu" ("Love is Blue") which came fourth for Luxembourg in 1967.

In the late 1960s he began a collaboration with Roger Whittaker which wrote the songs (English release): "Durham Town (The Leavin')" ("Mon Pays Bleu"), "Hello Good Morning Happy Day" ("Hello! Bonjour! Happy Day!"), "The Last Farewell" ("Le Dernier Adieu") and "I Don't Believe in If Anymore" ("Après La Guerre").
