= Duo Ouro Negro =

Kwela music group

- Genres: Kwela
- Years active: 1959–late 1980s

Duo Ouro Negro (also known as The Black Gold) was a kwela music group consisting of Raúl Indipwo and Milo MacMahon, formed in 1959. The music group was first a trio, but when Jose Alves Monteiro left, the band became a duo.

== Personal history ==
Milo MacMahon (1938–1985), whose full name is Emílio Vítor Caldeira MacMahon de Vitória Pereira, was born in Sá da Bandeira, Angola, on May 3, 1938. His early school years were attended at Liceu de Sá da Bandeira, moving later to Nova Lisboa and later to the Metropolis attending Escola de Regentes Agrícolas de Coimbra which he did not complete. He returned to Angola where he took a topographer course, having been placed in Carmona, where he found Raúl whom he had met in primary education. This reunion led to the idea of singing and playing the guitar together and thus Ouro Negro was born, later known as Duo Ouro Negro. Milo MacMahon played for Futebol Clube do Uíge, having been recommended to Benfica, but the Ouro Negro project spoke louder.

Raúl Indipwo(1933–2006), whose full name is Raúl José Aires Corte Peres Cruz Indipo, was born in Chibia, Angola, on November 30, 1933. Since his father was in the military he has to travel all through Angola. He attended Colégio D, Nuno Álvares Pereira, in Benguela and also D. João de Castro in Nova Lisboa. At 14 years of age he lost his father and has to abandon his studies in order to work. He worked at a fashion house for three years and during this time he was also a professional hunter. Later he was a cashier and assistant book keeper in Carmona, where he found his childhood friend Milo. This gave way to their reunion.

After Milo's death in 1985, Raúl continued with his solo project under the name Raúl Ouro Negro.

== History ==
Raúl and Milo met each other in childhood, in Benguela. At the beginning of their adulthood, they initiated a project, The Black Gold. The project centered on Angolan folklore. The Black Gold became an international expression, acting in Switzerland, France, Finland, Sweden, Denmark, Spain and Portugal. After Monteiro left the music group became known as Duo Ouro Negro. In the 1970s, the duo made performances in the United States, Australia, and France. Milo died in the late 1980s, which ended the career of the duo.

Initially their name was Ouro Negro, which was suggest by Maria Lucília Dias do Rádio Clube do Congo Português, this name was alluding to all that was precious, such as coffee, petroleum, and even a good football (soccer) player. Their success led them to various radio and television programs, in addition to countless shows, such as the television program of the Coronation of the Queen of Television in 1960 and the Rendez-vous avec Dany Kaye and the show celebrating the 20. Unicef's 7th anniversary, broadcast to more than 200 million viewers, which led to the duo's growing popularity internationally.

In 1962, Duo Ouro Negro released an EP that included their version of the theme "Mãe Preta", later banned by censorship because it addressed the issue of slavery. A theme by Piratine and Caco Velho, in an original interpretation by fado singer Maria da Conceição. Afterwards, this song was recovered with new lyrics by David-Mourão Ferreira, with the title Barco Negro para Amália Rodrigues. After April 25, 1974, this song was recreated by Dulce Pontes with the original lyrics, that is, Mãe Preta, and Romana also recorded a version of this theme on one of her records.

The Duo Ouro Negro, in addition to accompanying the dance rhythms of the time such as Twist, Madinson or Surf, introduced Kwéla to Europe, which in 1965 became the great musical trend. The year 1966 was marked by his performance at Olympia and the Alhambra in Paris. In the following year, this duo participates in the IV Grande Prêmio TV da Canção Portuguesa 1967 with the songs Livro Sem Fim and Quero Amanhecer, managing to reach the final with these two songs, ranking in 2nd and 4th places, respectively. Also, that year, they performed in the Sala Garnier of the Opera of Monte Carlo in front of the Princes of Monaco, within the scope of the celebrations of the 4th Centenary of the Principality. Also in 1967, they received the Portuguese Press Trophy. They returned to Olympia for three weeks in May and another three weeks in October, with great success.

In 1968, Duo Ouro Negro was successful in Canada and the United States, where in Chicago they signed a contract with Columbia Artists Management. Still on the American continent, the conquest of Latin America and later of Japan, in Asia, followed. Its success reached practically the whole world.

In the VI Grande Prêmio TV da Canção Portuguesa 1969, Duo Ouro Negro was ranked second with the song "Tenho Amor Para Amar".

On March 7, 1974, the Duo Ouro Negro appeared at the XI Grande Prêmio TV da Canção Portuguesa 1974 with Bailia dos Trovadores. After April 25, 1974, Duo Ouro Negro opted for more avant-garde musical approaches, ceasing to perform in Portugal with a stronger commitment to shows in the United States of America, Australia and Paris.

== Soundtrack ==
- "Kuríkutéla"
- "Muiowa"
- "Muxima"
- "Sylvie"
- "Maria Rita"
- "Blackground"
- "Empire of Yemanja"
- "Tomorrow"
- "I'll Take you with me"
