= Louis Neefs =

Belgian singer and presenter

- Louis Neefs, performing on TROS, 20 June 1972

Background information
- Born: Ludwig Adèle Maria Jozef Neefs; 8 August 1937; Gierle, Belgium
- Origin: Belgium
- Died: 25 December 1980 (aged 43) Lier, Belgium
- Genre: Pop
- Occupation: Singer

Louis Neefs (born Ludwig Adèle Maria Jozef Neefs, 8 August 1937 – 25 December 1980) was a Belgian singer and presenter, known for his participation in the Eurovision Song Contests of 1967 and 1969.

== Early career ==
Neefs was training for a career in technical drawing at college in Mechelen when he joined the college choir and started learning to play guitar. At first his musical activities were purely recreational, but by the late 1950s he had become a member of a group called Sun Spot. Via performances and talent competitions, Neefs' distinctive singing voice came to the notice of famous musical talent scout Jacques Kluger, who had also discovered, among others, Bobbejaan Schoepen. Kluger and Schoepen brought Neefs to the attention of record companies, and he was signed to a contract in 1958, releasing his first album in 1960. He achieved several top 20 singles in the Flemish chart, and a modicum of success in the Netherlands.

== Eurovision Song Contest ==
In 1967, Neefs was chosen, with the song "Ik heb zorgen" ("I Have Worries"), as the Belgian representative in the 12th Eurovision Song Contest, which took place on 8 April in Vienna. "Ik heb zorgen" finished in seventh place of 17 entrants.

In 1969, Neefs was again selected to represent Belgium, with the song "Jennifer Jennings" in the 14th Eurovision, held in Madrid on 29 March. This resulted in another seventh-place finish, of 16 entrants.

== Later career ==
Neefs continued to enjoy recording success, with the biggest hit of his career, "Margrietje", reaching No. 4 in 1972. He was also the "voice" of Thomas O'Malley in the Dutch-language version of Disney's The Aristocats.

In tandem with his musical career, Neefs was a presenter of television and radio shows for Flemish broadcaster VRT. He also became politically active, standing as a councillor in Mechelen.

== Death ==
Neefs was killed in a road accident in Lier on 25 December 1980, aged 43. His wife Liliane also died in the accident. They had two sons, Ludwig Neefs and Günther Neefs; the latter is now also a well-known singer in Belgium.

On 5 August 2007, a bust of Neefs was unveiled in his hometown of Gierle to honour what would have been his 70th birthday. Asteroid 38018 Louisneefs, discovered by Eric Elst at La Silla Observatory in 1998, was named in his memory.

Preceded by Tonia with "Un peu de poivre, un peu de sel"	Belgium in the Eurovision Song Contest; 1967	Succeeded by Claude Lombard with "Quand tu reviendras"
Preceded by Claude Lombard with "Quand tu reviendras"	Belgium in the Eurovision Song Contest; 1969	Succeeded by Jean Vallée with "Viens l'oublier"
