= United Kingdom in the Eurovision Song Contest 1967 =

- Eurovision Song Contest 1967
- Participating broadcaster: British Broadcasting Corporation (BBC)
- Country: United Kingdom
- Selection process: Artist: Internal selection Song: A Song for Europe 1967
- Selection date: 25 February 1967

Competing entry
- Song: "Puppet on a String"
- Artist: Sandie Shaw
- Songwriters: Bill Martin; Phil Coulter

Placement
- Final result: 1st, 47 points

Participation chronology

The United Kingdom was represented at the Eurovision Song Contest 1967 with the song "Puppet on a String", written by Bill Martin and Phil Coulter, and performed by Sandie Shaw. The British participating broadcaster, the British Broadcasting Corporation (BBC), selected its entry through a national final titled A Song for Europe 1967, after having previously selected the performer internally. The entry eventually won the Eurovision Song Contest.

== Before Eurovision ==
=== A Song for Europe 1967 ===
The British Broadcasting Corporation (BBC) held a national pre-selection to choose the song that would go to the Eurovision Song Contest 1967. It was held on 25 February 1967 and presented by Rolf Harris. Harris's weekly show had been the showcase for the five songs in the competition, which had been performed in successive weeks prior to the final.

The internal BBC selection of Sandie Shaw as the singer was something of a departure; in recognition of changing trends in the contest, she was arguably the first real "pop" star to be chosen as the British representative. Shaw and her manager Eve Taylor were permitted to select one of the finalists, submitting "Had a Dream Last Night", written by her regular songwriter and producer Chris Andrews, who had previously had a song in the 1965 national final, "One Day", performed by Kathy Kirby. Shaw had recorded a version of that track herself. Viewers voted on postcards via mail to decide the winner and the chosen song was "Puppet on a String".

A Song for Europe 1967
R/O	Song	Place
1	"Tell the Boys"	2
2	"I'll Cry Myself to Sleep"	5
3	"Had a Dream Last Night"	4
4	"Puppet on a String"	1
5	"Ask Any Woman"	3

Shaw released all five songs from the contest, with the winner featuring the runner up on the B-side of a single that reached No.1 in the UK singles chart for three weeks and selling in excess of 4,000,000 copies worldwide. Some estimates make this the biggest selling single globally by a British female artist. In Germany it sold in excess of 1,000,000 copies and was the biggest selling single of the year. Shaw also released an extended play maxi single featuring four of the five finalists, excluding the winner. This EP titled Tell The Boys, reached No.4 in the EP chart top 10. Shaw later recorded all five songs in Spanish, Italian, French and German. Eventually, all the various recordings of all five songs became available on various CD compilations.

== At Eurovision ==
After placing second five times, the United Kingdom finally won Eurovision ten years after its first entry in 1957. Harris himself would be the BBC's commentator for the final in Vienna. The show was seen by over 22 million viewers.

=== Voting ===
Every participating broadcaster assembled a jury panel of ten people. Every jury member could give one point to his or her favourite song.

Points awarded to the United Kingdom
Score	Country
7 points	France; Norway; Switzerland
5 points	Luxembourg
3 points	Austria; Belgium; Germany; Monaco
2 points	Finland; Italy; Netherlands
1 point	Ireland; Portugal; Sweden

Points awarded by the United Kingdom
Score	Country
2 points	France; Ireland; Luxembourg
1 point	Belgium; Germany; Italy; Netherlands
