= Rita Deneve =

Belgian singer (1944–2018)

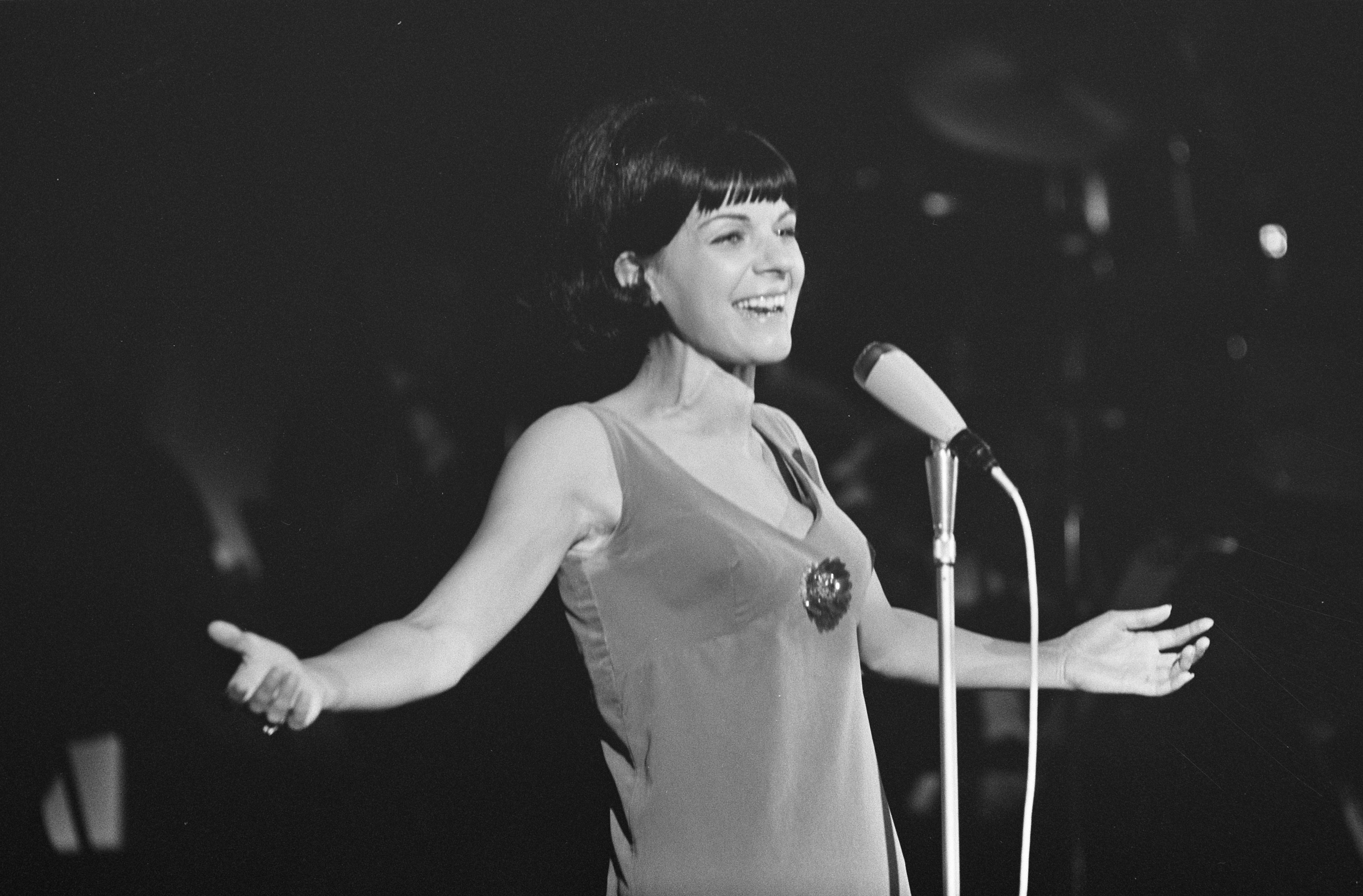
- Born: December 6, 1944; Liedekerke, Belgium
- Died: January 21, 2018 (aged 73); Mechelen, Belgium
- Occupation: Singer

Rita Deneve (December 6, 1944 – January 21, 2018) was a Belgian pop singer.

Deneve was born in Liedekerke. In 1969 she was part of the Belgian team competing at the Singing Europe '69 contest in Scheveningen, with the Wallace Collection and Joe Harris. In 1970 she performed at music festivals in Ostend and Middelkerke. She made Spanish-language and German-language recordings of some of her hits. She had a #1 hit in Flanders in 1971 with the song "De allereerste keer" ("The Very First Time"), and competed several times to be the Belgian entrant in the Eurovision Song Contest. She died in Mechelen in 2018, at the age of 73.
