= Sweden in the Eurovision Song Contest 1967 =

- Eurovision Song Contest 1967
- Participating broadcaster: Sveriges Radio (SR)
- Country: Sweden
- Selection process: Melodifestivalen 1967
- Selection date: 24 February 1967

Competing entry
- Song: "Som en dröm"
- Artist: Östen Warnerbring
- Songwriters: Marcus Österdahl; Curt Peterson; Patrice Hellberg

Placement
- Final result: 8th, 7 points

Participation chronology

Sweden was represented at the Eurovision Song Contest 1967 with the song "Som en dröm", written by Marcus Österdahl, Curt Peterson, and Patrice Hellberg, and performed by Östen Warnerbring. The Swedish participating broadcaster, Sveriges Radio (SR), selected its entry through a national final. The national final was named "Melodifestivalen" for the first time, the name still in use to the present day.

== Before Eurovision ==
=== Melodifestivalen 1967 ===
Melodifestivalen 1967 was the selection for the ninth song to represent Sweden at the Eurovision Song Contest. It was the eighth time that Sveriges Radio (SR) used this system of picking a song. Approximately 1,800 songs were submitted to SR for the competition. The final was held in the Cirkus in Stockholm on 24 February 1967, hosted by Maud Husberg and broadcast on Sveriges Radio TV but it was not broadcast on radio.

R/O	Artist	Song	Songwriters	Points	Place
1	Towa Carson	"Vem frågar vinden?"	Inger Berggren	11	5
2	Rolf Berg	"Ren vals"	Charlie Norman, Björn Lindroth	14	3
3	Marianne Kock	"Men vore du endast en visa"	Lennart Sjöberg, Carl-Olof Bergström	3	8
4	Östen Warnerbring	"En valsfan"	Gunnar Svensson, Hans Alfredson, Tage Danielsson	20	2
5	Ann-Louise Hanson	"Christina dansar"	Åke Hallgren	4	7
6	Svante Thuresson	"Förlåt min vän"	Johnny Carlsson	2	9
7	Towa Carson	"Alla har glömt"	Peter Himmelstrand	14	3
8	Sten Nilsson	"Svart-Olas polska"	Åke Hallgren	8	6
9	Ann-Louise Hanson	"Sjungas till sömns"	Mats Berthold, May-Brith Matson	0	10
10	Östen Warnerbring	"Som en dröm"	Curt Peterson, Marcus Österdahl, Patrice Hellberg	24	1

== At Eurovision ==
The entry finished 8th out of 17.

=== Voting ===
Points awarded to Sweden
Score	Country
2 points	Ireland; Norway
1 point	Finland; Portugal; Yugoslavia

Points awarded by Sweden
Score	Country
4 points	France
2 points	Ireland
1 point	Germany; Monaco; Norway; United Kingdom
