= Finland in the Eurovision Song Contest 1967 =

- Eurovision Song Contest 1967
- Participating broadcaster: Yleisradio (Yle)
- Country: Finland
- Selection process: National final
- Selection date: 11 February 1967

Competing entry
- Song: "Varjoon – suojaan"
- Artist: Fredi
- Songwriters: Lasse Mårtenson; Alvi Vuorinen

Placement
- Final result: 12th, 3 points

Participation chronology

Finland was represented at the Eurovision Song Contest 1967 with the song "Varjoon – suojaan", composed by Lasse Mårtenson, with lyrics by Alvi Vuorinen, and performed by Fredi. The Finnish participating broadcaster, Yleisradio (Yle), selected its entry through a national final.

== Before Eurovision ==
=== National final ===
Eight entries were selected for the competition from 240 received submissions. The selection jury also chose four singers (Danny, Fredi, Laila Kinnunen, and Marion Rung) to perform the songs, each with two songs. Yleisradio (Yle) held the national final on 11 February 1967 at its studios in Helsinki, hosted by Jaakko Jahnukainen. The final was not broadcast live since it had been recorded earlier in the afternoon. The winner was chosen by a professional jury consisting of twelve members. Each juror distributed their points as follows: either 1, 3 and 5 points for three songs, or 3 and 6 points for two songs. Since the first round did not end up in an absolute win, the second round was held between the top 3.

Advanced to second round

Final – 11 February 1967 – first round
R/O	Artist	Song	Songwriter(s)	Points	Place
1	Laila Kinnunen	"Revontuli"	Lasse Mårtenson; Lilli Fougstedt; Juha Vainio	8	6
2	Danny	"Sua kutsun, Maarit"	Lasse Mårtenson; Alvi Vuorinen	20	2
3	Marion Rung	"Kesän laulu"	Börje Sundgren	0	8
4	Fredi	"Varjoon – suojaan"	Lasse Mårtenson; Alvi Vuorinen	30	1
5	Laila Kinnunen	"Unohdusta ei ole"	Valto Laitinen	10	5
6	Danny	"Keskiyöllä"	Jorma Panula; Sauvo Puhtila	17	4
7	Marion Rung	"Goodbye"	Reino Markkula; Sauvo Puhtila	5	7
8	Fredi	"Oi tuntematon"	Börje Sundgren; Sauvo Puhtila	18	3

Final – 11 February 1967 – second round
Artist	Song	Songwriter(s)	Points	Place
Danny	"Sua kutsun, Maarit"	Lasse Mårtenson; Alvi Vuorinen	36	2
Fredi	"Varjoon – suojaan"	Lasse Mårtenson; Alvi Vuorinen	45	1
Fredi	"Oi tuntematon"	Börje Sundgren; Sauvo Puhtila	27	3

== At Eurovision ==
The contest was broadcast on TV-ohjelma 1 and on radio stations Yleisohjelma (both with commentary by Aarno Walli) and Ruotsinkielinen ulaohjelma.

On the night of the final Fredi performed eighth in the running order, following Sweden and preceding Germany. The Finnish entry was conducted by Ossi Runne. At the close of voting, Finland picked up three points and placed joint 12th with Portugal of the 17 entries.

=== Voting ===
Points awarded to Finland
Score	Country
1 point	Italy; Netherlands; Portugal

Points awarded by Finland
Score	Country
3 points	Belgium
2 points	Ireland; Luxembourg; United Kingdom
1 point	Sweden
