= Marva Mollet =

Belgian singer (born 1943)

Marva Mollet, known professionally as Marva (born 23 March 1943, in Vlissegem), is a Belgian singer who was very popular between 1963 and 1980 in Flanders. Her best-known songs are "Eiland in groen en blauw" ("Island Green and Blue"), "Oempalapapero" and "Rode rozen in de sneeuw" ("Red Roses in the Snow").

== Life ==
She was born Marva Mollet and grew up in Blankenberge. At age 20 she recorded her debut single, "Geef me nog een kans" ("Give me another chance") in 1963. In 1964 she married her manager and brought a son into the world.

Between 1963 and 1980 she scored hits in Flanders with "Eiland in groen en blauw" (1967), "Fiesta" (1969), "Niemand wil je als je ongelukkig bent" ("Nobody Wants You if You Are Unhappy") (1974), "Rode rozen in de sneeuw" ("Red Roses in the Snow") (1975) and "Oempalapapero" (1975).

In 1980 she left her audience and her music career with the song "Herinneringen" ("Memories"). She wanted some more time for her private life. Since then she has released no new songs. She began a new life as a shopkeeper in Blankenberge and Ostend.

Marva was also included in the Hall of Fame of Radio 2 for "A life of music" in 2006. Laura Lynn performed a virtual duet with her with the song "Rode rozen in de sneeuw". Marva's original recording of the song from 1975 was mixed, and once again became a hit.

On June 15, 2008, she was honored in De Haan, Belgium by hundreds of fans, on the occasion of her 65th birthday.

At the end of January 2015 at the Casino Kursaal in Ostend, Marva was honored by Flemish artists exactly 35 years after her retirement from show business.

== Trivia ==
- She finished at no. 359 in the Flemish version of De Grootste Belg
- She is referred to in the film Everybody's Famous! (2000) by Dominique Deruddere. The father calls his daughter Marva in the hope that someday she will be an equally successful singer. As he later told a manager says his daughter is named Marva the man asks skeptically: "Marva? Isn't she dead?"
- In 2010 the album "Goud van hier" with her biggest hits was released.
- In 2012 she released a two-CD set called "Alle 40 goed" with 40 of her best songs.

== Discography ==
=== Singles ===
Year	Single	Position		Album
Year	Single	Ultratop 50	Dutch Top 40	Album
2006	Rode rozen in de sneeuw (with Laura Lynn)	5	-	

== See also ==
- Music of Belgium
