= Yugoslavia in the Eurovision Song Contest 1967 =

- Eurovision Song Contest 1967
- Participating broadcaster: Jugoslavenska radiotelevizija (JRT)
- Country: Yugoslavia
- Selection process: Jugovizija 1967
- Selection date: 19 February 1967

Competing entry
- Song: "Vse rože sveta"
- Artist: Lado Leskovar
- Songwriters: Urban Koder; Milan Lindič

Placement
- Final result: 8th, 7 points

Participation chronology

Yugoslavia was represented at the Eurovision Song Contest 1967 with the song "Vse rože sveta", composed by Urban Koder, with lyrics by Milan Lindič, and performed by Lado Leskovar. The Yugoslav participating broadcaster, Jugoslavenska radiotelevizija (JRT), selected its entry through Jugovizija 1967.

== Before Eurovision ==
=== Jugovizija 1967 ===
The Yugoslav national final to select their entry, was held on 19 February at the RTV Ljubljana studios in Ljubljana and hosted by Tomaž Terček. There were 15 songs in the final, from the five subnational public broadcasters; RTV Ljubljana, RTV Zagreb, RTV Belgrade, RTV Sarajevo, and RTV Skopje. The winner was chosen by the votes of a jury of experts, one juror from each of the subnational public broadcasters of JRT. The winning song was "Vse rože sveta" performed by the Slovene singer Lado Leskovar, composed by Urban Koder and written by Milan Lindič. Lado Leskovar previously took part in the 1965 and 1966 Yugoslav finals.

Final – 19 February 1967
R/O	Broadcaster	Artist	Song	Points	Place
1	(Socialist Republic of Macedonia) RTV Skopje	Zafir Hadžimanov	"Me ostavaš nokva"	0	12
2	(Socialist Republic of Croatia) RTV Zagreb	Milan Bačić	"Meni nedostaješ ti"	1	9
3	(Socialist Republic of Bosnia and Herzegovina) RTV Sarajevo	Davorin Popović and Indeksi	"Pružam ruke"	5	5
4	(Socialist Republic of Serbia) RTV Belgrade	Zlatko Golubović	"Sam"	0	12
5	(Socialist Republic of Slovenia) RTV Ljubljana	Alenka Pinterič	"Tuje mesto"	6	4
6	(Socialist Republic of Macedonia) RTV Skopje	Zoran Milosavljević	"Glas od planinite"	5	5
7	(Socialist Republic of Croatia) RTV Zagreb	Zdenka Vučković and Ivica Šerfezi	"Malen je svijet"	15	3
8	(Socialist Republic of Bosnia and Herzegovina) RTV Sarajevo	Dragan Stojnić	"Za noć ili dan"	0	12
9	(Socialist Republic of Serbia) RTV Belgrade	Nada Knežević	"Suvišan pogled"	3	7
10	(Socialist Republic of Slovenia) RTV Ljubljana	Lado Leskovar	"Vse rože sveta"	25	1
11	(Socialist Republic of Macedonia) RTV Skopje	Dime Popovski	"Koga peam, koga ljubam"	0	12
12	(Socialist Republic of Croatia) RTV Zagreb	Zafir Hadžimanov	"Dođi noćas"	3	7
13	(Socialist Republic of Bosnia and Herzegovina) RTV Sarajevo	Kemal Monteno	"Ti si otišla"	16	2
14	(Socialist Republic of Serbia) RTV Belgrade	Zafir Hadžimanov	"Ceo svet je drugačiji"	1	9
15	(Socialist Republic of Slovenia) RTV Ljubljana	Marjana Deržaj	"Nebo na dlani"	1	9

== At Eurovision ==
The contest was broadcast on Televizija Beograd, Televizija Zagreb, and Televizija Ljubljana.

Vladimir "Lado" Leskovar performed 15th on the night of the Contest following Monaco and preceding Italy. At the close of the voting the song had received 7 points, coming 8th in the field of 17 competing countries.

=== Voting ===
Points awarded to Yugoslavia
Score	Country
2 points	Spain
1 point	Belgium; France; Italy; Luxembourg; Portugal

Points awarded by Yugoslavia
Score	Country
4 points	France
1 point	Austria; Belgium; Ireland; Luxembourg; Spain; Sweden
