= Spain in the Eurovision Song Contest 1965 =

- Eurovision Song Contest 1965
- Participating broadcaster: Televisión Española (TVE)
- Country: Spain
- Selection process: Eurofestival
- Selection date: 7 February 1965

Competing entry
- Song: "¡Qué bueno, qué bueno!"
- Artist: Conchita Bautista
- Songwriter: Antonio Figueroa Egea

Placement
- Final result: 15th, 0 points

Participation chronology

Spain was represented at the Eurovision Song Contest 1965 with the song "¡Qué bueno, qué bueno!", written by Antonio Figueroa Egea, and performed by Conchita Bautista. The Spanish participating broadcaster, Televisión Española (TVE), selected its entry through the national final Eurofestival. Bautista had already represented Spain in 1961 with "Estando contigo". "¡Qué bueno, qué bueno!", performed in position 3, placed fifteenth –tying for last place with the songs from Germany, Belgium, and Finland– out of eighteen competing entries with 0 points.

== Before Eurovision ==
=== Eurofestival ===
Televisión Española (TVE) organized a national selection process titled Eurofestival to choose its entry for the Eurovision Song Contest 1965. This selection had several phases, each culminating in a semi-final, and a final. The broadcaster received a total of 268 songs, from which it selected 54 candidates.

==== Preliminary phases ====
The 54 candidate songs were presented in turns to the audience in the weekly television show Eurofestival beginning on 4 October 1964. The half-hour shows were broadcast on TVE on Sunday mornings, and were hosted by José Luis Barcelona from the Miramar studios in Barcelona. At the end of each phase, a semi-final was held between the songs selected in that phase, with the top two songs in each semi-final going through the final.

First semi-final
Singer	Song	Songwriter(s)	Place	Result
Juan Carlos Monterrey	"Barco perdido"			Qualified
María del Carmen	"Yo me arrepentí"			Qualified

Second semi-final
Singer	Song	Songwriter(s)	Place	Result
Yoli	"Bajo un cielo español"	Mario Vas Ladredo	1	Qualified
Silvia Nelson	"Caballero andaluz"	Antonio Negreda; E. San Julián	2	Qualified
	"Vengo de lejos"		3	—N/a
	"El hombre sin pueblo"	Antonio Negreda; E. San Julián	4	—N/a
	"Vieja góndola"		5	—N/a
	"Cuando tú estás"		6	—N/a

Third semi-final
Singer	Song	Songwriter(s)	Place	Result
Dúo Dinámico	"Esos ojitos negros"	Manuel de la Calva; Ramón Arcusa		Qualified

==== Final ====
On the evening of 7 February 1965, TVE held the final at its Miramar studios in Barcelona, hosted by José Luis Barcelona and Irene Mir. In addition to the qualifiers in the semi-finals, TVE added additional songs, making a total of thirteen songs in the final.

The jury in the final consisted of sixteen members, a mixture of experts and television viewers: Jorge Arandes, Ramon Solanes, José María Quero, Artur Kaps, Jorge Alexandre, Julio Guíu, Joaquín Alfonso, Augusto Algueró, Enrique Galea, Manuel Salinger, and Enrique Galia were joined by five television viewers. Each juror voted on all songs except one; the song with the fewest votes was eliminated. This process was repeated until the winning song was left: "¡Qué bueno, qué bueno!", written by Antonio Figueroa Egea, and performed by Conchita Bautista.

Final – 7 February 1965
R/O	Singer	Song	Votes Final Round	Place
1	María del Carmen	"Yo me arrepentí"		13
2	Juan Carlos Monterrey	"Barco perdido"		12
3	Conchita Bautista	"¡Qué bueno, qué bueno!"	10	1
4	Santy	"Se lo he contado"		9
5	Luisita Tenor	"Caballero andaluz"		8
6	Dúo Dinámico	"Esos ojitos negros"	6	2
7	Yoli	"Bajo el cielo español"		6
8	Raphael	"Feriantes"		3
9	Adriangela	"Cantares"		4
10	Jaime Morey	"La bailaora"		10
11	Franciska	"El hombre y el toro"		11
12	Lorenzo Valverde	"Otra serenata"		7
13	Ángela	"Tengo miedo"		5

== At Eurovision ==
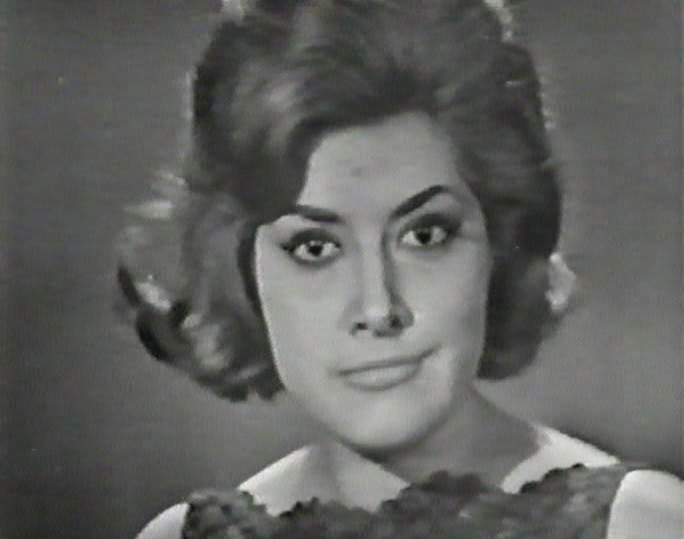
Conchita Bautista performing at Eurovision.

The Eurovision Song Contest 1965 was held on 20 March 1965 at the Sala di Concerto della RAI in Naples, Italy. Conchita Bautista performed "¡Qué bueno, qué bueno!" third in the running order, following the United Kingdom and preceding Ireland. Antonio Figueroa Egea conducted the event's orchestra performance of the Spanish entry. The song received nul point, sharing the last place with Germany, Belgium, and Finland.

TVE broadcast the contest in Spain on its television service with commentary by Federico Gallo. (Note: Deferred broadcast on TVE Canarias on 27 March 1965 at 21:50 (WET)) Radio Nacional de España (RNE) also aired the contest on Radio Nacional. Before the event, TVE aired a talk show introducing the Spanish jury.

=== Voting ===
Spain did not receive any points at the Eurovision Song Contest 1965.

Points awarded by Spain
Score	Country
5 points	United Kingdom
3 points	France
1 point	Luxembourg
