= I Belong (Kathy Kirby song) =

Song

- Cover of the Dutch release

Single by Kathy Kirby
- Released: 1965
- Composer: Peter Lee Sterling
- Lyricist: Phil Peters

Eurovision Song Contest 1965 entry
- Country: United Kingdom
- Artist: Kathy Kirby
- Language: English
- Composer: Peter Lee Sterling
- Lyricist: Phil Peters
- Conductor: Eric Robinson

Finals performance
- Final result: 2nd
- Final points: 26

Entry chronology
- ◄ "I Love the Little Things" (1964)
- "A Man Without Love" (1966) ►

"I Belong" is a song written by singer Daniel Boone (credited under his real name, Peter Lee Sterling), with lyrics by Phil Peters. It represented the United Kingdom in the Eurovision Song Contest 1965 performed by Kathy Kirby, where it came in 2nd place, losing to Luxembourg's "Poupée de cire, poupée de son", performed by France Gall. Kirby also recorded the song as a single, and it peaked on the music charts at No. 36 in Britain and No. 5 in Singapore.

== Lyrics ==
The song tells of the joy of finding true love for the first time, after a string of bad relationships:

But now my heart has recovered
From past affairs that turned wrong
All my dreams are uncovered
I belong, I belong, I belong

== At Eurovision ==
The song was performed by Kirby at Eurovision 1965, held in Naples on 21 March 1965. The song was performed second on the night, following the Netherlands' "'t Is genoeg" sung by Conny Vandenbos and preceding Spain's "¡Qué bueno, qué bueno!" sung by Conchita Bautista. By the close of voting, it had received 26 points, placing it 2nd in a field of 18.

== Other versions ==
Kirby also recorded a version of the song in Italian.

Preceded by "I Love the Little Things" by Matt Monro	United Kingdom in the Eurovision Song Contest; 1965	Succeeded by "A Man Without Love" by Kenneth McKellar
