= Germany in the Eurovision Song Contest 1965 =

- Eurovision Song Contest 1965
- Participating broadcaster: ARD (Note: Arbeitsgemeinschaft der öffentlich-rechtlichen Rundfunkanstalten der Bundesrepublik Deutschland) – Norddeutscher Rundfunk (NDR)
- Country: Germany
- Selection process: Ein Lied für Neapel
- Selection date: 27 February 1965

Competing entry
- Song: "Paradies, wo bist du?"
- Artist: Ulla Wiesner
- Songwriters: Barbara Kist; Hans Blum

Placement
- Final result: 15th, 0 points

Participation chronology

Germany was represented at the Eurovision Song Contest 1965 with the song "Paradies, wo bist du?", written by Barbara Kist and Hans Blum, and performed by Ulla Wiesner. The German participating broadcaster on behalf of ARD, Norddeutscher Rundfunk (NDR), selected its entry through a national final.

== Before Eurovision ==
=== Ein Lied für Neapel ===
Norddeutscher Rundfunk (NDR) held the national final at its studios in Hamburg, hosted by Henno Lohmeyer. Six songs took part, with the winning song chosen by an 11-member jury who each awarded one point to their favourite song. "Paradies, wo bist du?" was the choice of 8 of the jurors.

R/O	Artist	Song	Votes	Place
1	Ulla Wiesner	"Paradies, wo bist du?"	8	1
2	Peter Beil	"Nur aus Liebe"	0	4
3	Angelina Monti	"Robertino"	2	2
4	Leonie Brückner	"Auch Du wirst geh'n"	0	4
5	Nana Gualdi	"Wunder, die nie geschehen"	1	3
6	René Kollo	"Alles Glück auf dieser Welt"	0	4

== At Eurovision ==
On the night of the final Wiesner performed 5th in the running order, following Ireland and preceding Austria. Voting was by each national jury awarding 5-3-1 to their top 3 songs, and at the close "Paradies, wo bist du?" was one of four songs (along with the entries from Belgium, Finland, and Spain) which had failed to pick up a single point. This was the fourth consecutive contest in which four countries had failed to score, and a second consecutive nul-points for Germany, their last until 2015, 50 years later. The German jury awarded its 5 points to contest winners Luxembourg.

=== Voting ===
Germany did not receive any points at the Eurovision Song Contest 1965.

Points awarded by Germany
Score	Country
5 points	Luxembourg
3 points	France
1 point	Italy
