= Se piangi, se ridi =

1965 song by Bobby Solo

Single by Bobby Solo
- Language: Italian
- Released: 1965
- Composers: Gianni Marchetti; Roberto Satti
- Lyricists: Mogol; Roberto Satti

Eurovision Song Contest 1965 entry
- Country: Italy
- Artist: Roberto Satti
- As: Bobby Solo
- Language: Italian
- Composers: Gianni Marchetti; Roberto Satti
- Lyricists: Mogol; Roberto Satti
- Conductor: Gianni Ferrio

Finals performance
- Final result: 5th
- Final points: 15

Entry chronology
- ◄ "Non ho l'età" (1964)
- "Dio, come ti amo" (1966) ►

"Se piangi, se ridi" (English: "If you cry, if you laugh") is a song written by Gianni Marchetti, Bobby Solo and Mogol. It was first performed during the 15th edition of the Sanremo Music Festival, in January 1965, when Italian singer Bobby Solo and American folk band The New Christy Minstrels performed two different versions of the song, winning the competition.

The song went on to represent Italy in the Eurovision Song Contest 1965, performed in Italian by Bobby Solo. The song was performed thirteenth on the night, following Portugal's Simone de Oliveira with "Sol de inverno" and preceding Denmark's Birgit Brüel with "For din skyld". At the close of voting, it had received 15 points, placing 5th in a field of 18.

The song is a love ballad, with Solo telling his lover that he feels the same way she does because of the closeness of their relationship. As he expresses it in the lyrics, "always remember: what you do / you'll see it again in my face".

It was succeeded as Italian representative at the 1966 contest by Domenico Modugno with "Dio, come ti amo".

In 2005, the band Deerhoof released an electronic/experimental reworking of the song on a non-album single.

== Charts ==
Chart (1965)	Peak position
Argentina (CAPIF)	4
Belgium (Ultratop 50 Flanders)	2
Brazil (ABPD)	1
France (SNEP)	39
Italy (Musica e dischi)	1
Uruguay	3
