= Eurovision Song Contest 1965 =

International song competition

Date and venue
- Final: 20 March 1965
- Venue: Sala di Concerto della RAI; Naples, Italy

Organisation
- Organiser: European Broadcasting Union (EBU)
- Scrutineer: Miroslav Vilček

Production
- Host broadcaster: Radiotelevisione italiana (RAI)
- Director: Romolo Siena
- Musical director: Gianni Ferrio
- Presenter: Renata Mauro

Participants
- Number of entries: 18
- Debuting countries: Ireland
- Returning countries: Sweden
- Participation map: Participating countries

Vote
- Voting system: Each country awarded 5, 3 and 1 points (or combinations thereof) to their three favourite songs
- Winning song: Luxembourg "Poupée de cire, poupée de son"

The Eurovision Song Contest 1965 was the 10th edition of the Eurovision Song Contest, held on 20 March 1965 at the Sala di Concerto della RAI in Naples, Italy, and presented by Renata Mauro. It was organised by the European Broadcasting Union (EBU) and host broadcaster Radiotelevisione italiana (RAI), who staged the event after Italy's entry, "Non ho l'età" by Gigliola Cinquetti, won the 1964 contest.

Broadcasters from eighteen countries participated in the contest – a new record number of participants. Joining the sixteen countries which had participated in the previous year's event were Sweden, who returned after a one year absence, and Ireland, making its debut in the contest.

The winner was Luxembourg with the song "Poupée de cire, poupée de son", written by Serge Gainsbourg, and performed by the French singer France Gall. It was Luxembourg's second contest victory, following the nation's win in 1961. The United Kingdom, France, Austria and Italy rounded out the top five, with the United Kingdom finishing in second place for the fifth time, and Austria achieving its best-ever result with a fourth-place finish. A total of four countries received nul points and finished in joint last place.

With the winning song being of the pop genre, it marked the beginning of a sea change for the contest; it evolved from being an event dominated by chansons and ballads in its early years to one more greatly associated with schlager and pop music for the remainder of the 1960s and into the 1970s and 1980s.

== Location ==
The 1965 contest took place in Naples, Italy, following the country's victory at the 1964 contest with the song "Non ho l'età" performed by Gigliola Cinquetti. It was the first time that Italy had hosted the event. The chosen venue was the Sala di Concerto della RAI, in the Fuorigrotta suburb of the city. A part of the production centre of the Italian public broadcaster Radiotelevisione italiana (RAI) within the city, the auditorium was built between 1958 and 1963 and had space for an audience of around 1,000 people. Naples had been chosen by RAI as the host city due to the availability of the necessary equipment within the city's production facilities, as well as to honour Naples' history as a center for music in Europe, including the prestige which the canzone napoletana holds.

== Participants ==
Eurovision Song Contest 1965 – Participation summaries by country
- Austria; Belgium; Denmark; Finland; France; Germany; Ireland; Italy; Luxembourg; Monaco; Netherlands; Norway; Portugal; Spain; Sweden; Switzerland; United Kingdom; Yugoslavia

Broadcasters from a new record number of eighteen countries submitted entries for the contest. Sweden returned after a one-year absence, and Ireland made its first ever appearance. For the first time in the contest's history a competing entry was performed entirely in a language which was not the official language of the country it represented, namely the Swedish entry which was performed entirely in English.

Three of the competing artists at this year's event represented their countries for the second time: Conchita Bautista had represented Spain in 1961, Vice Vukov had represented Yugoslavia in 1963, and Udo Jürgens had represented Austria in 1964.

Eurovision Song Contest 1965 participants
Country	Broadcaster	Artist	Song	Language	Songwriter(s)	Conductor
Austria	ORF	Udo Jürgens	"Sag ihr, ich lass sie grüßen"	German	Frank Bohlen; Udo Jürgens	Gianni Ferrio
Belgium	BRT	Lize Marke	"Als het weer lente is"	Dutch	Jaak Dreesen; Jef Van den Berg	Gaston Nuyts
Denmark	DR	Birgit Brüel	"For din skyld"	Danish	Poul Henningsen; Jørgen Jersild	Arne Lamberth
Finland	YLE	Viktor Klimenko	"Aurinko laskee länteen"	Finnish	Reino Helismaa; Toivo Kärki	George de Godzinsky
France	ORTF	Guy Mardel	"N'avoue jamais"	French	Françoise Dorin; Guy Mardel	Franck Pourcel
Germany	NDR (Note: On behalf of the German public broadcasting consortium ARD)	Ulla Wiesner	"Paradies, wo bist du?"	German	Hans Blum; Barbara Kist	Alfred Hause
Ireland	RÉ	Butch Moore	"I'm Walking the Streets in the Rain"	English	Teresa Conlon; Joe Harrigan; George Prendergast	Gianni Ferrio
Italy	RAI	Bobby Solo	"Se piangi, se ridi"	Italian	Gianni Marchetti; Giulio Rapetti; Roberto Satti	Gianni Ferrio
Luxembourg	CLT	France Gall	"Poupée de cire, poupée de son"	French	Serge Gainsbourg	Alain Goraguer
Monaco	TMC	Marjorie Noël	"Va dire à l'amour"	French	Raymond Bernard; Jacques Mareuil	Raymond Bernard
Netherlands	NTS	Conny Vandenbos	"Het is genoeg"	Dutch	Johnny Holshuyzen; Joke van Soest	Dolf van der Linden
Norway	NRK	Kirsti Sparboe	"Karusell"	Norwegian	Jolly Kramer-Johansen	Øivind Bergh
Portugal	RTP	Simone de Oliveira	"Sol de inverno"	Portuguese	Jerónimo Bragança; Carlos Nóbrega e Sousa	Fernando de Carvalho
Spain	TVE	Conchita Bautista	"Qué bueno, qué bueno"	Spanish	Antonio Figueroa Egea	Adolfo Ventas Rodríguez
Sweden	SR	Ingvar Wixell	"Absent Friend"	English	Alf Henrikson; Dag Wirén	William Lind
Switzerland	SRG SSR	Yovanna	"Non, à jamais sans toi"	French	Bob Calfati; Jean Charles	Mario Robbiani
United Kingdom	BBC	Kathy Kirby	"I Belong"	English	Phil Peters; Peter Lee Sterling	Eric Robinson
Yugoslavia	JRT	Vice Vukov	"Čežnja" (Чежња)	Serbo-Croatian	Julio Marić; Žarko Roje	Radivoje Spasić

== Production and format ==
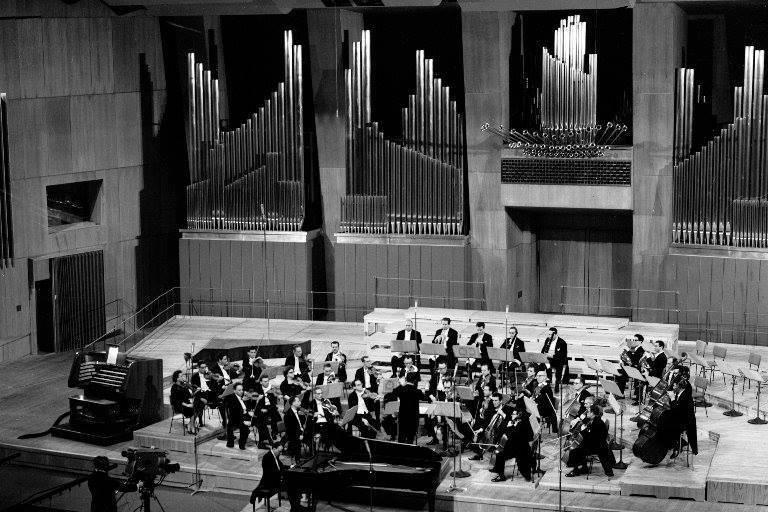
The stage of the Sala di Concerto (pictured in 1963 at its inauguration); the auditorium's pipe organ was prominently featured during the contest.

The contest was produced and broadcast by the Italian public broadcaster RAI. Romolo Siena served as director, Francesco De Martino served as designer, and Gianni Ferrio served as musical director of the RAI Orchestra comprising 48 musicians. Each participating delegation was allowed to nominate its own musical director to lead the orchestra during the performance of its country's entry, with the host musical director also conducting for those countries which did not nominate their own conductor. The event was presented by Renata Mauro and was overseen on behalf of the contest organisers, the European Broadcasting Union (EBU), by Miroslav Vilček as scrutineer.

The stage design within the venue had the orchestra situated in the centre, on top a transparent dais which allowed for special lighting effects to be made during the performances. Stage left was a performance area which the majority of artists used for their performances, with a backdrop featuring the Eurovision logo, while stage right was the scoreboard. The performance area was also used by Mauro in her opening and closing remarks, and introduce the competing acts. The large pipe organ within the RAI auditorium, with over 9,000 pipes, featured prominently behind the orchestra during the contest, as well as during the voting sequence when Mauro was pictured standing in front of it.

Each country, participating through a single EBU member broadcaster, was represented by one song performed by up to two people on stage. No entry was allowed to be commercially published before 10 February 1965; this caused an issue for the Italian entry, "Se piangi, se ridi" by Bobby Solo, which had won the 15th Sanremo Music Festival on 30 January, as around 240,000 copies of the single release had been available in Italy by the cut-off date. Although a small number of the other broadcasters participating in the event raised objections to the song competing, given that RAI was hosting the event, with disqualification of the host broadcaster considered impossible, and an understanding that there was little time available to select a new song, "Se piangi, se ridi" was ultimately allowed to compete.

The results of the event were determined through jury voting, with the same voting system introduced for the previous year's event retained. Each jury comprised ten individuals representing the average television viewer and radio listener; as such no individuals in the music industry, including composers, music publishers, and people employed by record companies, were able to sit on the jury. Each jury comprised twenty members, who each had three votes to award in total, which could be given to one song or divided across two or three songs. Jurors could not vote for their own country, and no abstentions were allowed. The song which was awarded the most votes received five points, the second-highest three points, and the third-highest one point. If only two songs had been awarded votes they would receive six and three points for first and second respectively, and if only one song was awarded votes they would receive nine points.

The draw to determine the running order took place on 9 February 1965 in Geneva, Switzerland. Each country's delegation was provided a 45-minute slot to rehearse with the orchestra in the contest venue. Rehearsals commenced on 17 March 1965, starting with Switzerland, followed by the UK, Spain, Italy, Germany and Austria also rehearsing on the first day. Rehearsals continued on 18 March for Norway, Portugal, Monaco, Sweden, France and Belgium, and on 19 March for Ireland, Denmark, Luxembourg, Finland, Yugoslavia and the Netherlands. Technical rehearsals were held on 20 March, followed by two full dress rehearsals ahead of the live broadcast that evening; the second dress rehearsal was also heard by the national juries.

== Contest overview ==
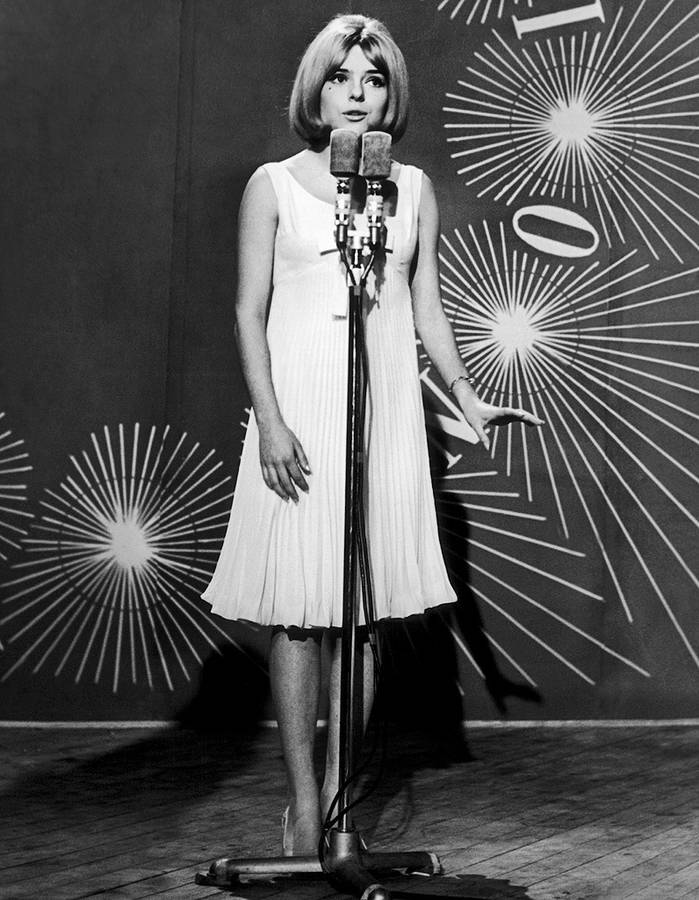
France Gall, the winning artist of the 1965 contest, during her Eurovision performance

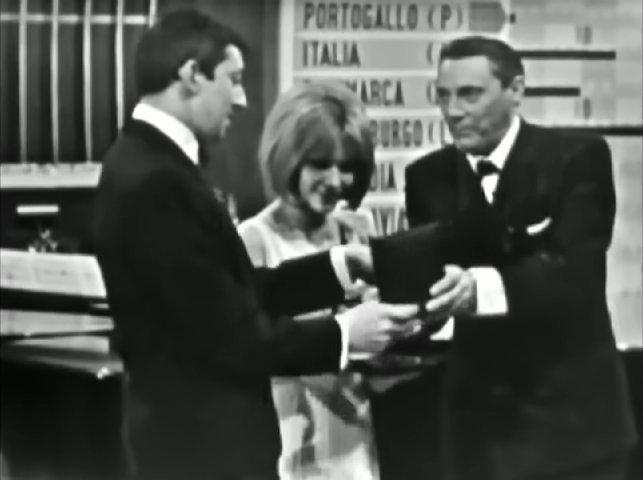
Mario Del Monaco (right) presenting the winners' medallions to Gall (center) and Serge Gainsbourg (left)

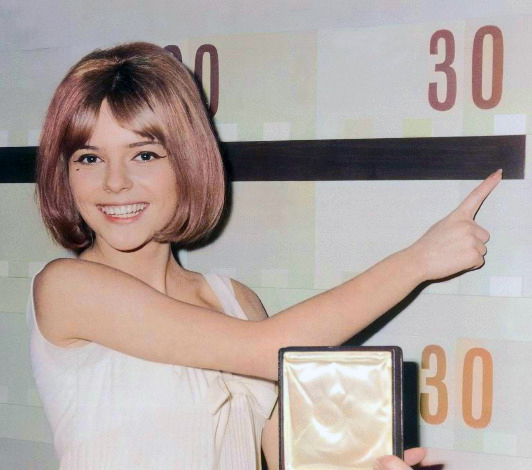
A colourised photo of Gall with her winner's medallion in front of the scoreboard

The contest was held on 20 March 1965 at 22:00 (CET) and lasted 1 hour and 38 minutes. The interval act was a performance by the Italian operatic tenor Mario Del Monaco, who gave a rendition of "O sole mio", although rather than singing live he mimed his performance to a previously recorded version. The prize for the winning artist and songwriters, a medallion engraved with the Eurovision logo designed by Hans Mettel, was presented by Del Monaco.

The winner was Luxembourg represented by the song "Poupée de cire, poupée de son", written by Serge Gainsbourg and performed by the French singer France Gall. It was Luxembourg's second contest win, following victory at the 1961 contest. The United Kingdom came in second for the fifth time, while France placed third. Austria, in fourth place, achieved its best-ever result, while four countries, namely Belgium, Finland, Germany and Spain, finished in joint last place with nul points.

The contest was a tumultuous experience for Gall who, at 17 years old, was the youngest competitor at this year's event. During rehearsals the musicians in the orchestra were displeased with the fast tempo of the song, resorting to booing and whistling towards Gall as a form of disrespect and protest. This infuriated Gainsbourg, who insulted the orchestra and stormed out while threatening to leave Naples entirely and return to Paris, leaving Gall alone with an angry orchestra to finish the rehearsal. While the fractious relationship between Gainsbourg and the orchestra was eventually settled, the experience had a continued impact on Gall's confidence during the contest; as Gall recounted in 2015, this led to what she perceived to be a shaky and nervy performance during the event, which she believed diminished her chances of doing well in the contest. When she looked for support over the telephone from her then-boyfriend, the French singer Claude François, he supposedly reinforced her doubts, telling her she sang out-of-key. Ultimately, however, Gall would take the lead from the first round of votes, and retain the lead until the very end, beating the UK's Kathy Kirby by six points. Upon her victory, before going out on stage for the award presentation and reprise performance of the winning song, Gall called François again, who broke up with her over the phone; Kirby meanwhile, who had been the pre-contest favourite to win, was upset at losing to the young Gall and stormed into the Luxembourgish delegation's dressing room, claiming the contest had been rigged in Gall's favour, and slapped her. Gall was subsequently in tears as she went back on stage, which were interpreted as tears of joy by the assembled press.

Results of the Eurovision Song Contest 1965
R/O	Country	Artist	Song	Points	Place
1	Netherlands	Conny Vandenbos	"Het is genoeg"	5	11
2	United Kingdom	Kathy Kirby	"I Belong"	26	2
3	Spain	Conchita Bautista	"Qué bueno, qué bueno"	0	15
4	Ireland	Butch Moore	"I'm Walking the Streets in the Rain"	11	6
5	Germany	Ulla Wiesner	"Paradies, wo bist du?"	0	15
6	Austria	Udo Jürgens	"Sag ihr, ich lass sie grüßen"	16	4
7	Norway	Kirsti Sparboe	"Karusell"	1	13
8	Belgium	Lize Marke	"Als het weer lente is"	0	15
9	Monaco	Marjorie Noël	"Va dire à l'amour"	7	9
10	Sweden	Ingvar Wixell	"Absent Friend"	6	10
11	France	Guy Mardel	"N'avoue jamais"	22	3
12	Portugal	Simone de Oliveira	"Sol de inverno"	1	13
13	Italy	Bobby Solo	"Se piangi, se ridi"	15	5
14	Denmark	Birgit Brüel	"For din skyld"	10	7
15	Luxembourg	France Gall	"Poupée de cire, poupée de son"	32	1
16	Finland	Viktor Klimenko	"Aurinko laskee länteen"	0	15
17	Yugoslavia	Vice Vukov	"Čežnja"	2	12
18	Switzerland	Yovanna	"Non, à jamais sans toi"	8	8

=== Spokespersons ===
Each participating broadcaster appointed a spokesperson, connected to the contest venue via telephone lines and responsible for announcing, in English or French, the votes for its respective country. Known spokespersons at the 1965 contest are listed below.

- Finland – Poppe Berg
- Netherlands – Dick van Bommel
- Sweden – Edvard Matz

== Detailed voting results ==
Jury voting was used to determine the points awarded by all countries. The announcement of the results from each country was conducted in the order in which they performed, with the spokespersons announcing their country's points in English or French in ascending order. The detailed breakdown of the points awarded by each country is listed in the tables below, with voting countries listed in the order in which they presented their votes.

Detailed voting results of the Eurovision Song Contest 1965
		Total score	Netherlands	United Kingdom	Spain	Ireland	Germany	Austria	Norway	Belgium	Monaco	Sweden	France	Portugal	Italy	Denmark	Luxembourg	Finland	Yugoslavia	Switzerland
Contestants	Netherlands	5							**5**											
Contestants	United Kingdom	26			**5**				1	**6**		3			1	**5**				**5**
Contestants	Spain	0																		
Contestants	Ireland	11												3	**5**				3	
Contestants	Germany	0																		
Contestants	Austria	16		3		**5**								**5**	3					
Contestants	Norway	1						1												
Contestants	Belgium	0																		
Contestants	Monaco	7		**5**															1	1
Contestants	Sweden	6														3		3		
Contestants	France	22	1		3	1	3				**5**						3	1	**5**	
Contestants	Portugal	1									1									
Contestants	Italy	15	3	1			1			3	3		3				1			
Contestants	Denmark	10										**5**					**5**			
Contestants	Luxembourg	**32**	**5**		1	3	**5**	**5**	3			1				1		**5**		3
Contestants	Finland	0																		
Contestants	Yugoslavia	2											1	1						
Contestants	Switzerland	8						3					**5**							

=== 5 points ===
The below table summarises how the maximum points available were awarded from one country to another. The winning country is shown in bold. Luxembourg and the UK each received the maximum score from four of the voting countries; Austria, Denmark and France received two sets of maximum scores each; and Ireland, Monaco, the Netherlands and Switzerland each received one maximum score.

Distribution of 5 points awarded at the Eurovision Song Contest 1965
N.	Contestant	Nation(s) giving 5 points
4	**Luxembourg**	Austria, Finland, Germany, Netherlands
4	United Kingdom	Belgium, (Note: Awarded 6 points as only two countries received votes among its jury) Denmark, Spain, Switzerland
2	Austria	Ireland, Portugal
2	Denmark	Luxembourg, Sweden
2	France	Monaco, Yugoslavia
1	Ireland	Italy
1	Monaco	United Kingdom
1	Netherlands	Norway
1	Switzerland	France

== Broadcasts ==
Broadcasters competing in the event were required to relay the contest via its networks; non-participating EBU member broadcasters were also able to relay the contest. Broadcasters were able to send commentators to provide coverage of the contest in their own native language and to relay information about the artists and songs to their television viewers. These commentators were typically sent to the venue to report on the event, and were able to provide commentary from small booths constructed at the back of the venue, with 20 booths ultimately constructed for the event.

For the first time the contest was broadcast by members of the International Radio and Television Organisation (OIRT), the counterpart of the EBU within Eastern European countries, via its Intervision network. In addition to the participating countries, the contest was reportedly broadcast in Czechoslovakia, East Germany, Hungary, Poland, Romania and the Soviet Union, with an expected global audience of 100 to 200 million. Known details on the broadcasts in each country, including the specific broadcasting stations and commentators, are shown in the tables below.

Broadcasters and commentators in participating countries
Country	Broadcaster	Channel(s)	Commentator(s)	Ref.
Austria	ORF	ORF		
Belgium	BRT	BRT		
Belgium	RTB	RTB, Premier Programme		
Denmark	DR	DR TV		
Finland	YLE	TV-ohjelma 1	Aarno Walli	
Finland	YLE	Yleisohjelma	Erkki Melakoski	
Finland	YLE	Ruotsinkielinen ula-ohjelma	Jerker Sundholm	
France	ORTF	Première Chaîne, France Inter	Pierre Tchernia	
Germany	ARD	Deutsches Fernsehen	Hermann Rockmann	
Ireland	RÉ	Telefís Éireann	Bunny Carr	
Ireland	RÉ	Radió Éireann	Kevin Roche	
Italy	RAI	Programma Nazionale TV, Secondo Programma	Renato Tagliani	
Luxembourg	CLT	Télé-Luxembourg		
Netherlands	NTS	Nederland 1	Teddy Scholten	
Netherlands	NRU	Hilversum 2		
Norway	NRK	NRK Fjernsynet, NRK	Erik Diesen	
Portugal	RTP	RTP		
Spain	TVE	TVE, TVE Canarias (Note: Deferred broadcast on TVE Canarias on 27 March 1965 at 21:50 (WET))	Federico Gallo	
Spain	RNE	RNE		
Sweden	SR	Sveriges TV, SR P1	Berndt Friberg	
Switzerland	SRG SSR	TV DRS		
Switzerland	SRG SSR	TSR	Jean Charles	
Switzerland	SRG SSR	TSI, Radio Monte Ceneri		
Switzerland	SRG SSR	Radio Sottens		
United Kingdom	BBC	BBC1	David Jacobs	
United Kingdom	BFBS	BFBS Radio	Ian Fenner	
Yugoslavia	JRT	Televizija Beograd		
Yugoslavia	JRT	Televizija Ljubljana		
Yugoslavia	JRT	Televizija Zagreb		

Broadcasters and commentators in non-participating countries
Country	Broadcaster	Channel(s)	Commentator(s)	Ref.
Czechoslovakia	ČST	ČST		
East Germany	DFF	DFF (Note: Delayed broadcast on 15 April 1965 at 22:15 (CET))		
Hungary	MTV	MTV (Note: Delayed broadcast on 11 September 1965 at 21:00 (CET))		
Malta	MBA	MTV	Victor Aquilina	
Poland	TP	TV Polska		

== Legacy ==
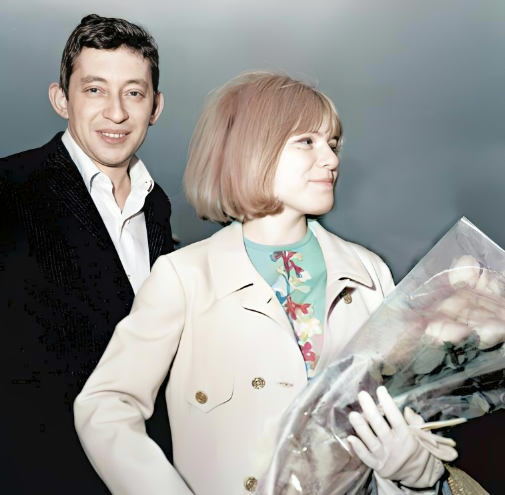
A colourised photo of Gall (right) and Gainsbourg (left) the day after the contest

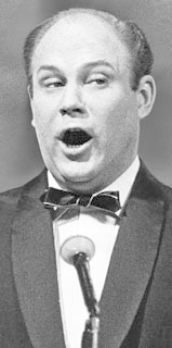
Ingvar Wixell, the Swedish entrant, performing at the Svensk sångfestival

The 1965 contest, and in particular its winner, has since been viewed as a monumental moment in the event's history. Although pop music had been present in the contest in past editions, the vast majority of songs and winners had fit more into the "chanson", "canzone" or ballad categories. "Poupée de cire, poupée de son", considered emblematic of the yé-yé genre, is thus commonly referred to as the contest's first pop winner, as well as the first winner which was more reflective of European popular music at the time, and its win had a big impact on the types of songs and performers which would be selected to compete in future contests. Following another pop winner in 1967, the UK's Sandie Shaw and "Puppet on a String", pop songs, and in particular schlager music, would go on to become a staple of future editions of the contest, with several winners from the 1970s onwards fitting into this genre.

Although past contest entries had achieved commercial success outside of their countries of origin, no previous winner had achieved the chart success that "Poupée de cire, poupée de son" went on to accomplish in the weeks and months after the contest, reaching the top 10 in singles charts in Belgium, Finland, France, Luxembourg, the Netherlands, Norway, Switzerland and West Germany, as well as in Argentina, French-speaking Canada, Japan, and Singapore. Gall became one of Eurovision's first breakthrough stars, and the commercial success of "Poupée de cire, poupée de son" helped pave the way for the contest to be seen as a platform to drive forward professional careers and achieve commercial success across Europe and worldwide.

Gall and Gainsbourg, who had first developed a creative partnership in 1964 with "N'écoute pas les idoles" ("English: Don't listen to idols"), continued to work together after the contest, spawning further hits including the controversial "Les sucettes ("English: Lollipops"); although on the surface it is a song about a girl who likes lollipops, just as with "Poupée de cire, poupée de son", Gainsbourg's lyrics were laced with subtext, in this case double meanings about fellatio. Although Gall claimed that she was too young to understand this when she recorded it, it dented her artistic image and led to a rift between herself and Gainsbourg and her career soon dipped. Upon meeting her future husband, the French singer Michel Berger, her career had a resurgence, and she only performed songs written by him in future years. This partnership led to her most successful album, Babacar, in 1987, which featured "Ella, elle l'a", which became a worldwide hit the same year. The ending of her previous relationship with Claude François would serve as inspiration for his 1967 song "Comme d'habitude"; Paul Anka would subsequently buy the rights to adapt the song into English, which would eventually become "My Way", a hit song for Frank Sinatra in 1969.

Gainsbourg returned to the contest two times as a songwriter: in 1967 he contributed another yé-yé song, "Boum-Badaboum", which represented Monaco at that year's contest where it was performed by Minouche Barelli and finished in fifth place; and in 1990 his song "White and Black Blues" performed by Joëlle Ursull came second for France. Also a singer, Gainsbourg gained notoriety himself in 1969 with his song "Je t'aime... moi non plus", a duet with his then-girlfriend Jane Birkin, which although a commercial success was controversial for its overly sexual content, leading it to be banned from radio play in several countries and denounced by the Vatican.

"Poupée de cire, poupée de son" was subsequently nominated in 2005 to compete in Congratulations: 50 Years of the Eurovision Song Contest, a special broadcast to determine the contest's most popular entry of its first 50 years as part of the contest's anniversary celebrations. One of 14 entries chosen to compete, "Poupée de cire, poupée de son" ultimately finished in fourteenth place.

Although the contest had no specific rules about the language in which a song should be performed in, there was an implicit understanding that each country should perform in the language, or one of the languages of that country. While some previous entries had been partly performed in a foreign language to that country, e.g. the 1960 and 1961 German entries, which had one verse each in French, and the 1963 Austrian entry, which had one verse in English, the Swedish entry at this year's entry was the first song to be performed entirely in a language other than that of the country it represented, in this case completely in English. This led to protest from several of the other broadcasters following the event, which led to a rule change being implemented for the 1966 contest, explicitly stating that all countries had to be represented by a song in one of that country's official languages. This language rule would remain until 1973, when freedom of language was once again permitted, only to be reintroduced ahead of the 1977 contest; the rule was finally abolished indefinitely for the 1999 edition and all future contests.

== Notes and references ==
=== Bibliography ===
- Murtomäki, Asko (2007). Finland 12 points! Suomen Euroviisut (in Finnish). Helsinki, Finland: Teos. ISBN 978-951-851-106-2.
- O'Connor, John Kennedy (2010). The Eurovision Song Contest: The Official History (2nd ed.). London: Carlton Books. ISBN 978-1-84732-521-1.
- Richard, Jean-Marc; Clapasson, Mary; Tanner, Nicolas (2017). La Saga Eurovision [The Eurovision Saga] (in French). Lausanne, Switzerland: Éditions Favre. ISBN 978-2828915490.
- Roxburgh, Gordon (2012). Songs for Europe: The United Kingdom at the Eurovision Song Contest. Vol. One: The 1950s and 1960s. Prestatyn, United Kingdom: Telos Publishing. ISBN 978-1-84583-065-6.
- Roxburgh, Gordon (2014). "Errata". Songs for Europe: The United Kingdom at the Eurovision Song Contest. Vol. Two: The 1970s. Prestatyn, United Kingdom: Telos Publishing. pp. 368–372. ISBN 978-1-84583-093-9.
- Thorsson, Leif; Verhage, Martin (2006). Melodifestivalen genom tiderna : de svenska uttagningarna och internationella finalerna [Melodifestivalen through the ages: the Swedish selections and international finals] (in Swedish). Stockholm, Sweden: Premium Publishing. ISBN 91-89136-29-2.
