= Tereza Kesovija =

Tereza Kesovija OFAL
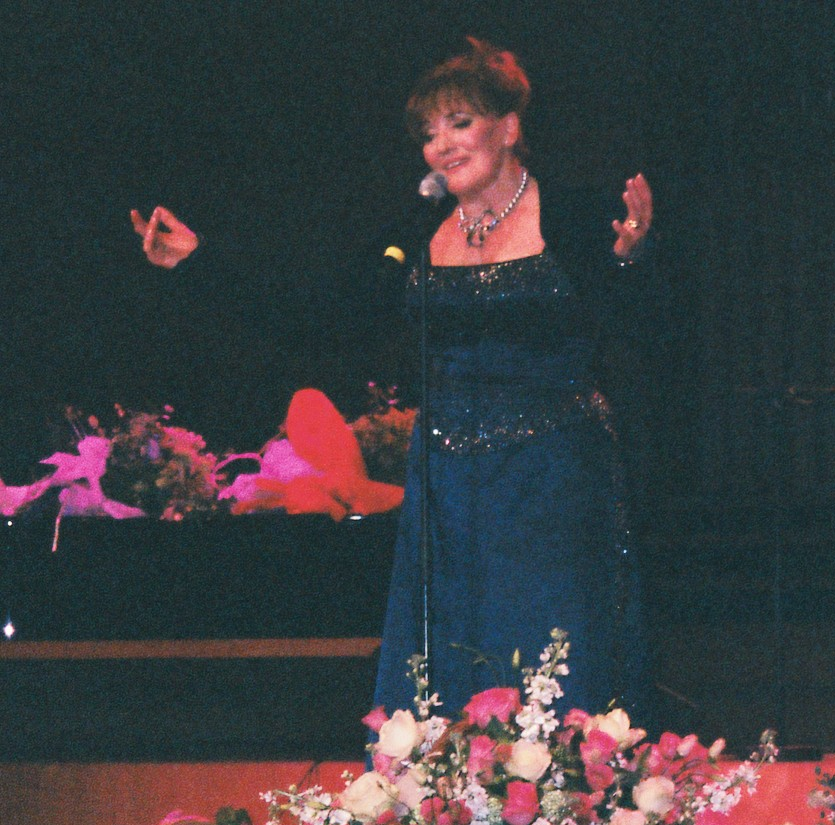
- Kesovija performing live in Vatroslav Lisinski, April 2009
- Born: Tereza Ana Kesovija; 3 October 1938 (age 88); Dubrovnik, Kingdom of Yugoslavia
- Occupation: Singer
- Spouses: Miro Ungar (m. 1962; div. 1973) Ronald Lopatny (m. 1974; div. 1990)
- Children: 1
- Musical career
- Genres: Pop; classical; adult contemporary; easy listening; chanson
- Years active: 1961–present
- Labels: Jugoton; PGP RTB; ZKP RTLJ; Croatia Records; Columbia Records; Dallas Records; EMI; Barclay Records; Hayat Production

Tereza Ana Kesovija (pronounced [terěːza âna kesǒʋija]; born 3 October 1938) is an internationally acclaimed Croatian recording artist. She was one of the most recognizable figures on the music scene in the former Yugoslavia and is renowned for her wide vocal range and operatic style. She also had a successful career in France. She has held many concerts around the world, being one of the few Yugoslav musicians to have sold out shows in The Royal Albert Hall, L'Olympia and Carnegie Hall. She appeared twice as an entrant in the Eurovision Song Contest, representing Monaco in 1966 and Yugoslavia in 1972.

== Early life ==
Kesovija was born in Dubrovnik and grew up in Konavle and Dubrovnik, where she received her early music education. She won a federal young musicians' competition in Ljubljana, Slovenia. Afterwards, she graduated from the flute program at the Zagreb Music Academy and began appearing in amateur music events as a student. In 1962, shortly after the start of her professional career, she won her first international contest in Saint-Vincent, Italy. Following this success, Tereza toured the USSR and recorded an EP of Italian songs for the major Russian music company, Melodiya. She spent 1963 and 1964 touring the USSR, Poland, Finland, Denmark, Germany, Switzerland, Norway, and Sweden, and made numerous TV appearances in these countries.

== Music career ==
=== France ===
In 1965, she moved to France, although she did not speak French. There, she obtained a great amount of popularity. She initially performed in cabarets, notably at the Carević cabaret. Reflecting on her early days in France, she said: "Six tough months, I used to remain in smoke until early in the morning. Waiting for my performances, I didn’t know what to do. I was sitting all alone smoking cigarette after cigarette." In 1967, she achieved her first major French success with the release of "La chanson de Lara" (Lara's Theme) from the film Doctor Zhivago.

The song was well-received, selling over 50,000 copies. Following the album La chanson de Lara, she recorded her second French album C’est ma chanson featuring the song "Je l'aime, je l'aime", which sold over 160,000 copies. Her recording of "Bien plus fort" led to her selection by Grace Kelly to represent Monaco in the Eurovision Song Contest 1966. She was frequently referred to as La bête de scène or Super-Dalida by the French press. In 1968, Kesovija performed with Enrico Macias at the L'Olympia in Paris. This marked her second appearance at the Olympia following her 1966 debut. She embarked on tours across France during this period.

=== 1970s ===
During the 1970s, Tereza became a globally recognized star, representing Yugoslav and French songs worldwide. In Yugoslavia, her song "Nono, moj dobri Nono" (Grandpa, My Dear Grandpa) gained popularity. Claudio Villa recorded "Il tuo mondo", an Italian version of Tereza's "Nono", while Mireille Mathieu recorded the French version, "Pour deux coeurs qui s'aiment". She performed at numerous prestigious festivals including those in Mexico City, Rio de Janeiro, Sopot, Palma de Majorca, Sofia, and Istanbul. In Yugoslavia, she was honored with the Best Female Singer of the Year Award six years in a row (1974–79).

Tereza continued to have success performing at Yugoslav festivals. She received numerous golden records and multiple times received the Yugoslav award for Best Record Seller – Golden Bird. In 1972, she represented Yugoslavia in the Eurovision Song Contest with "Muzika i ti" (The Music and You), achieving ninth place, and later recorded a French cover, "La Musique et toi". At the beginning of the 1970s, she relocated from Paris to Zagreb, the capital of Croatia, focusing more on her career in Yugoslavia. In 1978, she returned with her interpretation of "Je suis née ce jour-là".

She recorded several French records for EMI during this time and embarked on numerous tours across Russia, Egypt, Mexico, Japan, the United States, Germany, and Eastern Europe. By the late 1970s, she reached the peak of her fame. All her records received awards, she performed for Yugoslav president Josip Broz Tito, and she was Tito's favorite singer. Her biggest hits from the late 1970s include "Što je ostalo od ljubavi", "Zaboravi ako možeš", "Sviraj mi, sviraj", "Sve se vraća sve se plaća", and others.

=== 1980s ===
Throughout the 1980s, she continued to tour globally and recorded several albums in France. She remained successful, performing at many significant Yugoslav festivals in Split, Zagreb, Belgrade, among others. She received the Best Yugoslav Female Singer of the Year award multiple times and achieved golden, platinum, and diamond records. A notable event in 1988 was her performance at the Olympia Hall in Paris, heralded as the event of the season. Kesovija concluded the 1980s with tours in Scandinavia and representing the Yugoslavia national football team on Italian TV during the World Cup.

=== 1990s to present ===
In the decade following the breakup of Yugoslavia in 1991, wars erupted across the former Yugoslavia, including the Croatian War of Independence from 1991 to 1995. Kesovija expressed her support through song and held numerous concerts in Italy, France, and Germany to raise funds for Croatia's defense. She also performed in Zagreb with Serge Lama during this period. In 1999, Jacques Chirac honored Tereza with the Knighthood of High Decoration of Arts and Culture, along with the Golden Chart of Humanism. She began the reconstruction of an 18th-century house near Dubrovnik, formerly belonging to an old aristocratic family.

Entering the new millennium, she scored a major hit with "I ni me stra" (And I Don't Have Any Fear). In 2002, her Olympia concert was released on CD. This year marked a significant point in her career as she performed alongside Oscar and Grammy winner, Michel Legrand. Their rendition of Les parapluies de Cherbourgh was acclaimed as the concert of the year. In 2005, Kesovija celebrated her 45-year career with the concert Mojih 45 skalina at the Vatroslav Lisinski Concert Hall. She made her fourth appearance at the Olympia Concert Hall in 2007, marking her return to France.

She released her Croatian album Zaustavi vrijeme (Stop the Time), which became the third best-selling album in Croatia. After 2008, she toured Slovenia, Macedonia, Croatia, and Bosnia and Herzegovina. In 2010, she celebrated 50 years onstage with the concert "Još se srce umorilo nije" at Zagreb's Lisinski Concert Hall. Her press conference for her first post-war concerts in Serbia garnered significant media attention, with over 200 journalists in attendance. In 2011, she resumed performances in Serbia and Montenegro, participating in charity events including UNESCO's gala concerts. Her discography includes 12 records released by Columbia Records, along with approximately 30 LPs, 70 singles, and 12 CDs from other labels.

== Legacy ==
Tereza's songs are widely popular across the Yugoslav region. Her song "Moja posljednja i prva ljubavi" was covered by Serbian singer and guitar player Milja Smiljković and is included in her set list of concerts she holds at Knez Mihailova in Belgrade, Serbia.

== Discography ==
- La Chanson de Lara (EMI, 1967)
- C´est ma chanson (EMI, 1969)
- Tereza (Jugoton, 1971)
- Tereza & Julio Iglesias Live in Bulgaria (Balkanton, 1973)
- Tereza (PGP RTB, 1974)
- Tereza & Miro Ungar (Amiga, 1974)
- Nježne strune mandoline (Jugoton, 1975)
- Stare ljubavi (Jugoton, 1976)
- Tereza (Jugoton, 1978)
- Što je ostalo od ljubavi (Jugoton, 1978)
- Poljubi me (Jugoton, 1979)
- Moja splitska ljeta 1 (Jugoton, 1980)
- Sanjam (PGP RTB, 1981)
- Tereza (Jugoton, 1981)
- Sinoć, kad sklopih oči (ZKP RTLJ, 1982)
- Ja sam pjesma (PGP RTB, 1982)
- Prijatelji stari gdje ste (Jugoton, 1982)
- Na kušinu (PGP RTB, 1983)
- Spomenar (PGP RTB, 1983)
- Ponovni susret (PGP RTB, 1984)
- Koncert v Cankarjevem domu (RTVLj, 1984)
- Pronađi put (Jugoton, 1985)
- Bokelji i Tereza (PGP RTB, 1985)
- Molim te, ostani (Jugoton, 1986)
- Moja posljednja i prva ljubavi (Jugoton, 1987)
- Moja splitska ljeta 2 (Jugoton, 1988)
- Live `a l'Olympia (Jugoton, 1988)
- Nezaboravne melodije (Orfej RTZ, 1989)
- Ljubav je moj grijeh (Croatia Records, 1990)
- To sam ja (Tutico/Croatia Records, 1995)
- Gold Mix Tereza (Melody, 1995)
- Kad jednog dana prisjetim se svega (Croatia Records, 1997)
- Gdje ima srca tu sam i ja (Croatia Records, 1999)
- Samo malo intime (Croatia Records, 1999)
- Spomenar (compilation) (Taped Pictures, 2000)
- Ja sam pjesma (compilation) (Taped Pictures, 2001)
- Kronologija (Perfect Music/Croatia Records, 2002)
- S druge strane sna (live with Michel Legrand) (Croatia Records, 2003)
- Mojih 45 skalina (Croatia Records) (2005)
- Platinum collection (Croatia Records) (2007)
- Zaustavi vrijeme (Dallas Records)(2007)
- Live à l´Olympia (Dallas Records) (2008)
- Ja sam pjesma (PGP RTS) (2009)
- Najljepše ljubavne pjesme, Love Collection (Croatia Records, 2012)
- Parkovi, Tereza Kesovija pjeva Alfija Kabilja (Croatia Records, 2013)
- La chanson de Lara – EP (1966/Parlophone/Warner Music France, 2014)
- Grand prix Eurovision 1966 – EP (1966/Parlophone/Warner Music France, 2014)
- Oči duše (Dallas Records, 2016) - Porin Meilleur album de l'année
- To sam je (C'est moi) - Autobiographie 2014
- To sam je (C'est moi) Film documentaire sur la vie de TEREZA
- Ima te (Tu existes)

Preceded by Marjorie Noël with "Va dire à l'amour"	Monaco in the Eurovision Song Contest; 1966	Succeeded by Minouche Barelli with "Boum-Badaboum"
Preceded by Krunoslav Slabinac with "Tvoj dječak je tužan"	Yugoslavia in the Eurovision Song Contest; 1972	Succeeded by Zdravko Čolić with "Gori vatra"
