= Estando contigo =

1961 song by Conchita Bautista

Song by Conchita Bautista

from the EP Estando contigo
- Language: Spanish
- A-side: "Estando contigo" / "La niña de Embajadores"
- B-side: "Carnavalito gitano" / "Dama de España"
- Released: 1961
- Genre: Flamenco-yeyé
- Label: Toreador / Iberofon
- Composer: Augusto Algueró
- Lyricist: Antonio Guijarro

Eurovision Song Contest 1961 entry
- Country: Spain
- Artist: Conchita Bautista
- Language: Spanish
- Composer: Augusto Algueró
- Lyricist: Antonio Guijarro
- Conductor: Rafael Ferrer

Finals performance
- Final result: 9th
- Final points: 8

Entry chronology
- "Llámame" (1962) ►

"Estando contigo"

Song by Marisol

from the album Ha llegado un ángel
- Language: Spanish
- Released: 1961
- Label: Montilla
- Composer: Augusto Algueró
- Lyricist: Antonio Guijarro

Music video
- "Estando contigo" on YouTube

"Estando contigo" (Spanish pronunciation: [esˈtando konˈtiɣo]; "Being with You") is a song with music composed by Augusto Algueró and lyrics written by Antonio Guijarro for the 1961 Spanish musical film An Angel Has Arrived, where it is performed by Marisol. The song was first performed by Conchita Bautista, representing Spain at the Eurovision Song Contest 1961, placing ninth.

== Background ==
=== Conception ===
Augusto Algueró composed the music and Antonio Guijarro wrote the lyrics of "Estando contigo" for the 1961 musical film An Angel Has Arrived, to be performed by Marisol.

=== Eurovision ===
On 13–14 February 1961, "Estando contigo" performed by Conchita Bautista competed in the national final organized by Televisión Española (TVE) to select its first ever entrant in the Eurovision Song Contest. The song won the competition so it became the Spanish entry for the Eurovision Song Contest 1961.

On 18 March 1961, the Eurovision Song Contest was held at the Palais des Festivals et des Congrès of Cannes hosted by the Radiodiffusion-Télévision Française (RTF), and broadcast live throughout the continent. Conchita Bautista performed "Estando contigo" first on the night, preceding Monaco's "Allons, allons les enfants" performed by Colette Deréal. This was Spain's first appearance at the contest, and the first occasion on which a song was full performed in Spanish language. Rafael Ferrer conducted the event's orchestra in its performance.

At the close of voting, "Estando contigo" had received eight points, placing ninth in a field of sixteen. It was succeeded as Spanish entry at the 1962 contest by "Llámame" performed by Victor Balaguer. Conchita Bautista would return to the contest in 1965 with "Qué bueno, qué bueno".

=== Film ===
On 8 June 1961 the film An Angel Has Arrived starring Marisol premiered in Spain, in which she sings several songs composed especially for the film, including "Estando contigo".

== Releases ==
"Estando contigo" by Conchita Bautista was released in Spain by Toreador/Iberofon in a vinyl EP along with other three songs: "La niña de Embajadores", "Carnavalito gitano", and "Dama de España".

The soundtrack album of An Angel Has Arrived with the songs sung by Marisol was released in Spain by Montilla in a vinyl LP including "Estando contigo" as the first track of the B-side. Montilla subsequently released the album in different vinyl LP editions in Colombia, Mexico, Peru, the United States, and Venezuela. "Estando contigo" was also released by Montilla in Spain in a vinyl EP distributed by Zafiro titled Canciones de la película "Ha llegado un ángel" along with other three songs from the film: "Rumbita", "Canción de Marisol", and "Bulerías".

== Charts ==
=== Weekly charts ===
Chart	Version	Peak position	Date	R.
Spain (Discomania)	Marisol	6	24 July 1961	

== Legacy ==
=== Cover versions ===
The song was subsequently covered many times and released by different singers:

- José Guardiola covered the song in a 1961 EP.
- Los Cinco Latinos covered the song in a 1961 EP.
- La Lupe covered the song in her 1971 album La Lupe en Madrid.
- Paco Ortega e Isabel Montero covered the song in a 2003 compilation album tribute to Augusto Algueró.
- Celia Flores featuring Bebe covered the song in her 2016 album 20 años de Marisol a Pepa Flores.
- Maximiliano Calvo covered the song in 2020.

=== Other performances ===
- Carmen Sevilla performed the song in The Ed Sullivan Show aired on CBS on 3 January 1965.
- Marta Sánchez performed the song in the show Europasión, aired on La 1 of Televisión Española on 21 May 2008 to choose by popular vote the best song that Spain has sent to Eurovision.
- In the show La mejor canción jamás cantada aired on La 1 of Televisión Española to choose by popular vote the best Spanish song ever sung, Azúcar Moreno performed "Estando contigo" in the episode dedicated to the 1960s, aired on 22 February 2019.
- Gala 1 of the eleventh season of Operación Triunfo, aired on 19 January 2020 on La 1 of Televisión Española, opened with all its contestants paying tribute to Marisol performing the song in a group medley with "Ola, ola, ola" and "Tómbola".
- Celia Flores performed the song at the 34th Goya Awards ceremony held on 25 January 2020, in tribute to Marisol –her mother–, the 2020 Honorary Goya Award laureate.

=== Impersonations ===
Some performances of "Estando contigo" were recreated in different talent shows:

- In the seventh episode of the second season of Tu cara me suena aired on 12 November 2012 on Antena 3, Anna Simón impersonated Marisol singing "Estando contigo" replicating the performance she made on 19 October 1962 in VARA's Rudi Carrell Show.
- In the fifteenth episode of the sixth season of Tu cara me suena aired on 26 January 2018 on Antena 3, Lucía Jiménez impersonated Marisol singing "Estando contigo" replicating the performance she made on 12 October 1968 in TVE's Galas del sábado.
- In the opening number of the first episode of the eleventh season of Tu cara me suena aired on 12 April 2024 on Antena 3, Merche impersonated Carmen Sevilla singing "Estando contigo" replicating part of the performance she made in The Ed Sullivan Show.

=== In other media ===
"Estando contigo" is used as the theme song of a daily morning magazine television show that bears its name that has been broadcast since 29 February 2016 on CMM TV. A version of the song is used in an advertising campaign launched by CaixaBank in Spain on 13 January 2025.
