= Ann-Christine Nyström =

Finnish singer (1944–2022)

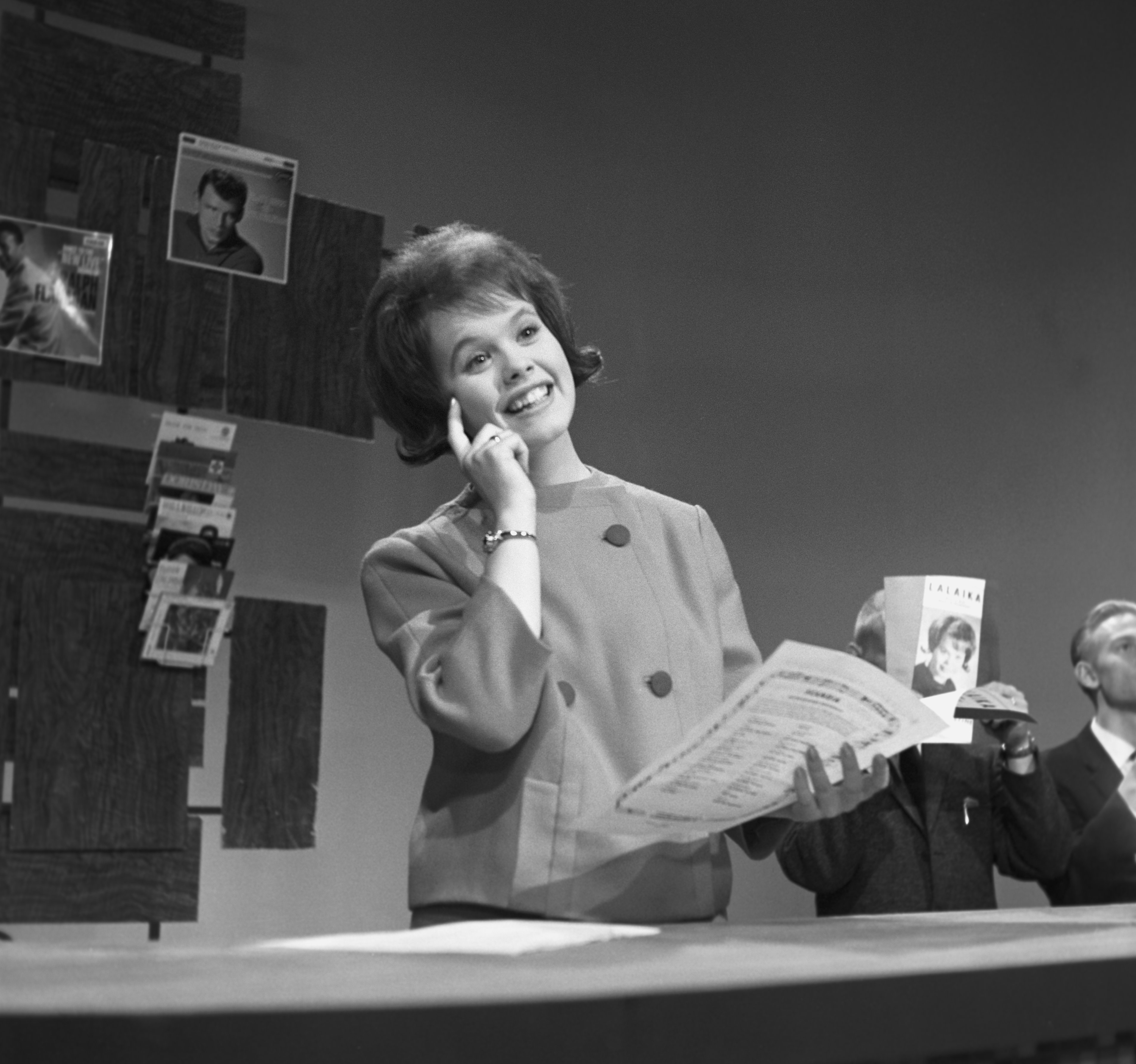
- Ann-Christine in 1962

Background information
- Also known as: Ann-Christine
- Born: Ann-Christine Nyström; 26 July 1944; Helsinki, Finland
- Died: 5 October 2022 (aged 78) Järfälla, Sweden
- Occupation: Singer
- Years active: 1962–1973

Ann-Christine Nyström-Silén (née Nyström; 26 July 1944 – 5 October 2022), also known by her stage name Ann-Christine, was a Finnish singer who performed in the Eurovision Song Contest 1966 for Finland with the song "Playboy".

== Career ==
Nyström with the Ulla Ja Tiina recorded the Jack Jordan and Barbara Ruskin composition, "Hail Love!" which was released in Finland as "Vie vaan!" on Sonet T 6538 in 1969.

Nyström chose to end her musical career in 1973 after 11 years in show business, and moved to Stockholm, Sweden, in 1976, where she lived until her death.

Nyström died in Stockholm on 5 October 2022, at the age of 78.

| Preceded by Viktor Klimenko with Aurinko laskee länteen | Finland in the Eurovision Song Contest; 1966 | Succeeded by Fredi with Varjoon – suojaan |
