= Sweden in the Eurovision Song Contest 1965 =

- Eurovision Song Contest 1965
- Participating broadcaster: Sveriges Radio (SR)
- Country: Sweden
- Selection process: Artist: Internal selection Song: National final
- Selection date: 13 February 1965

Competing entry
- Song: "Absent Friend"
- Artist: Ingvar Wixell
- Songwriters: Dag Wirén; Alf Henrikson

Placement
- Final result: 10th, 6 points

Participation chronology

Sweden was represented at the Eurovision Song Contest 1965 with the song "Absent Friend", composed by Dag Wirén, with lyrics by Alf Henrikson, and performed by Ingvar Wixell. The Swedish participating broadcaster, Sveriges Radio (SR), selected its entry through a national final titled Svensk sångfinal, after having previously selected the performer internally.

For the first time, one singer sang all the songs in the national final, and Ingvar was also the first male singer to represent Sweden. It was the first Eurovision entry that was not performed in the country's native language; this led to the introduction of a language restriction the following year. The song was originally titled "Annorstädes vals". At Eurovision, Sweden finished 10th out of 18.

== Before Eurovision ==
=== Svensk sångfinal ===
Svensk sångfinal (retroactively often referred to as Melodifestivalen 1965) was the selection for the seventh song to represent Sweden at the Eurovision Song Contest, held at the Cirkus in Stockholm on 13 February 1965. It was the sixth time that Sveriges Radio (SR) used this system of picking a song. Ingvar Wixell performed all of the songs. Eight songs were submitted to SR for the competition, of which two were turned down by Wixell. Regional juries selected the winning song. The final was held in the Cirkus in Stockholm on 13 February 1965, hosted by Birgitta Sandstedt and was broadcast on Sveriges Radio TV but was not broadcast on radio.

R/O	Song	Songwriters	Points	Place
1	"Stilla och tyst"	Owe Thörnqvist	28	2
2	"Kommer vår"	Bobbie Ericson, Bo Eneby	5	4
3	"Varm i dej"	Bo Nilsson	2	5
4	"Förtrollad stad"	Torbjörn Lundqvist, Bo Setterlind	14	3
5	"Väldigt vacker"	Georg Riedel, Berndt Rosengren	1	6
6	"Annorstädes vals"	Dag Wirén, Alf Henrikson	50	1

== At Eurovision ==
On the night of the final Wixell performed 10th in the running order, following Monaco and preceding France. Sweden gained 6 points and ranked 10th. The Swedish jury awarded its 5 points to Denmark.

=== Voting ===
Points awarded to Sweden
Score	Country
5 points	
3 points	Denmark; Finland
1 point	

Points awarded by Sweden
Score	Country
5 points	Denmark
3 points	United Kingdom
1 point	Luxembourg
