= Conchita Bautista =

Spanish singer and actress

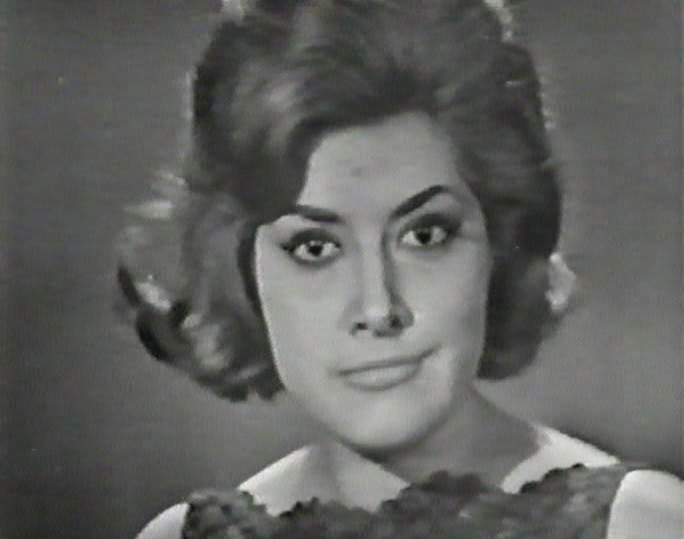
- Conchita Bautista at Eurovision 1965

Background information
- Born: María Concepción Bautista Fernández; 27 October 1936 (age 89)
- Origin: Seville, Spain
- Genres: Pop, Flamenco
- Occupation: Singer

María Concepción Bautista Fernández (born 27 October 1936), better known as Conchita Bautista (Spanish pronunciation: [konˈtʃita βawˈtista]), is a Spanish singer and actress. She represented Spain in the Eurovision Song Contest 1961 and 1965.

Bautista moved from her native Andalusia to Madrid in her teens and quickly established herself as an actress, appearing in a number of films in the 1950s. At the same time she was earning a reputation as an interpreter of Andalusian music and gained a recording contract with the Columbia label.

On 13–14 February 1961, Bautista took part in the Spanish selection for the Eurovision Song Contest 1961 with the song "Estando contigo", which was chosen as the Spanish debut entry in the contest. On 18 March, she performed "Estando contigo" as the opening song in Cannes, France, and at the end of voting she placed ninth of the 16 entries.

On 7 February 1965, Bautista came through a very convoluted selection process to win the Spanish ticket for a second time for the Eurovision Song Contest 1965 with "Qué bueno, qué bueno". On 20 March, in Naples, "Qué bueno, qué bueno" was one of four songs (along with those from Germany, Belgium, and Finland) which failed to score, representing Spain's second nul points following Víctor Balaguer in 1962.

In later years, Bautista forged a successful recording and touring career in Latin America, Italy, Greece, and Turkey as well as in Spain.

== Selected filmography ==
Year	Title	Role	Notes
1955	The Moorish Queen	Laura	
1958	Vengeance	Singer	
1958	La novia de Juan Lucero		
1962	Escuela de seductoras		
1964	La Boda		
1971	A mí las mujeres ni fu ni fa		

Preceded by Debut	Spain in the Eurovision Song Contest; 1961	Succeeded by Víctor Balaguer with "Llámame"
Preceded by Los TNT with "Caracola"	Spain in the Eurovision Song Contest; 1965	Succeeded by Raphael with "Yo soy aquél"
