= Luxembourg in the Eurovision Song Contest 1965 =

- Eurovision Song Contest 1965
- Participating broadcaster: Compagnie Luxembourgeoise de Télédiffusion (CLT)
- Country: Luxembourg
- Selection process: Artist: Internal selection Song: National final
- Selection date: 21 February 1965

Competing entry
- Song: "Poupée de cire, poupée de son"
- Artist: France Gall
- Songwriter: Serge Gainsbourg

Placement
- Final result: 1st, 32 points

Participation chronology

Luxembourg was represented at the Eurovision Song Contest 1965 with the song "Poupée de cire, poupée de son", written by Serge Gainsbourg, and performed by French singer France Gall. The Luxembourgish participating broadcaster, the Compagnie Luxembourgeoise de Télédiffusion (CLT), selected its entry through a national final, after having previously selected the performer internally. The song went on to win the contest, bringing Luxembourg their second Eurovision victory.

== National Final ==
=== Tiercé des Animatrices ===
Tiercé des Animatrices was the finale to a series organised by RTL to find the best television presenter out of three candidates. The finale of Tiercé des Animatrices was broadcast live on 21 February 1965 from the Grand Auditorium de la Villa Louvigny, Luxembourg City and was hosted by Jacques Navadic. Although the actual premise of the show was unrelated to the Eurovision Song Contest, France Gall performed an interval act during the show in which she performed four songs and one was chosen to represent Luxembourg at the Eurovision Song Contest 1965.

== At Eurovision ==
The contest was broadcast on Télé-Luxembourg.

On the night of the final Gall performed 15th in the running order, following Denmark and preceding Finland. In the voting Poupée de cire, poupée de son led from start to finish, gaining 32 points and winning by a 6-point margin over "I Belong" from the United Kingdom.

=== Voting ===
Points awarded to Luxembourg
Score	Country
5 points	Austria; Finland; Germany; Netherlands
3 points	Ireland; Norway; Switzerland
1 point	Denmark; Spain; Sweden

Points awarded by Luxembourg
Score	Country
5 points	Denmark
3 points	France
1 point	Italy

== Congratulations: 50 Years of the Eurovision Song Contest ==
"Poupee de cire, poupée de son" was one of the fourteen Eurovision songs chosen by fans to compete in the Congratulations 50th anniversary special in 2005. Gall did not appear at the event, nor did Luxembourg (who withdrew from competing in Eurovision after 1993) broadcast it. The song appeared ninth in the running order, following "Fly on the Wings of Love" by the Olsen Brothers and preceding "Everyway That I Can" by Sertab Erener. Like the other songs on the evening, it was represented by dancers performing alongside video footage of Gall's original performance. At the end of the first round, "Poupee de cire, poupee de son" was not announced as one of the five songs proceeding to the second round. It was later revealed that the song finished fourteenth and last, scoring 37 points.

=== Voting ===
Points awarded to "Poupee de cire, poupée de son" (Round 1)
Score	Country
12 points	
10 points	
8 points	Austria; Belgium
7 points	Monaco
6 points	
5 points	
4 points	
3 points	Israel
2 points	Finland; Russia; Ukraine
1 point	Croatia; Greece; Poland; Spain; Sweden
