= Augusto Algueró =

Spanish composer and music director (1934–2011)

- Born: Augusto Algueró Dasca; 23 February 1934; Barcelona, Spain
- Died: 16 January 2011 (aged 76); Torremolinos, Spain
- Other name: Gustavo Dasca
- Occupations: Composer and music director
- Spouses: Carmen Sevilla (m. 1961; div. 1974) Natividad Benito (m. 1986)

Augusto Algueró Dasca (23 February 1934 – 16 January 2011) was a Spanish composer, arranger and music director. He wrote more than 500 songs and about 200 musical scores for films and television.

== Career ==
Algueró was born in Barcelona, and studied both music and medicine. Among his most famous songs are "Penélope", which was performed by Joan Manuel Serrat, as well as "Noelia" by Nino Bravo, "Tómbola" by Marisol and "La chica yé-yé" by Concha Velasco.

He wrote the debut entry of Spain in the Eurovision Song Contest at the 1961 contest, "Estando contigo" by Conchita Bautista. He was the musical director of the 1969 contest, which was held in Madrid, and also conducted "Catherine", sung by Romuald Figuier, representing Luxembourg and "Vivo Cantando", sung by Salomé, representing Spain. "Vivo Cantando" tied for first place with other three songs with 18 points. This win marked Spain's second win in the contest and the first time that a country had won two years in a row. At the 1970 contest he conducted the Spanish entry, "Gwendolyne" sung by Julio Iglesias. He wrote and conducted the Spanish entry at the 1972 contest, "Amanece" sung by Jaime Morey.

He was also the musical director of the first OTI Festival, which was held in Madrid in 1972, and also conducted "Niña", sung by Marisol, representing Spain, "Busco mi destino", sung by Rona, representing Uruguay, "Sabes que aquí estamos América", sung by Victor Heredia, representing Argentina, "Glória Glória Aleluia", sung by Tonicha, representing Portugal, "Oh señor", sung by Basilio, representing Panama and "Siempre habrá en la luna una sonrisa", sung by Fernando Casado, representing the Dominican Republic. He conducted at the interval act an orchestral medley of two of his songs, "Penélope" and "Te Quiero, Te Quiero".

Algueró died at his home in Torremolinos, at the age of 76, after suffering a heart attack.

== Selected filmography ==
Year	Title	Notes
1950	Criminal Brigade	
1952	Persecution in Madrid	
1952	Forbidden Trade	
1952	The Pelegrín System	
1953	The Dance of the Heart	
1954	One Bullet Is Enough	
1955	Closed Exit	
1955	Three are Three	
1956	The Adventures of Gil Blas	
1958	The Nightingale in the Mountains	
1958	Red Cross Girls	
1959	Listen To My Song	
1960	An American in Toledo	
1961	An Angel Has Arrived	
1962	Tómbola	
1962	Canción de Juventud	
1963	Rocío from La Mancha	
1965	Television Stories	
1966	Road to Rocío	
1967	Historia de la frivolidad	
1968	Tuset Street	
1974	Cabaret Woman	

Preceded by (United Kingdom) Norrie Paramor	Eurovision Song Contest conductor 1969	Succeeded by (Netherlands) Dolf van der Linden
