= Yugoslavia in the Eurovision Song Contest 1965 =

- Eurovision Song Contest 1965
- Participating broadcaster: Jugoslavenska radiotelevizija (JRT)
- Country: Yugoslavia
- Selection process: Jugovizija 1965
- Selection date: 6 February 1965

Competing entry
- Song: "Čežnja"
- Artist: Vice Vukov
- Songwriters: Julio Marić; Žarko Roje

Placement
- Final result: 12th, 2 points

Participation chronology

Yugoslavia was represented at the Eurovision Song Contest 1965 with the song "Čežnja", composed by Julio Marić, with lyrics by Žarko Roje, and performed by Vice Vukov. The Yugoslav participating broadcaster, Jugoslavenska radiotelevizija (JRT), selected its entry through Jugovizija 1965. Vukov had already represented Yugoslavia in 1963.

== Before Eurovision ==
=== Jugovizija 1965 ===
The Yugoslav national final to select their entry, was held on 6 February at the Radnički Dom in Zagreb. The host was Željka Marković. There were 8 songs in the final, from five subnational public broadcasters. The subnational public broadcaster RTV Skopje made a comeback. The winner was chosen by the votes of an eight-member jury of experts, one juror for each of the six republics and the two autonomous provinces. The winning entry was "Čežnja" performed by Croatian singer Vice Vukov, composed by Julijo Marić and written by Žarko Roje. Vice Vukov had already won the national final two years earlier and had represented Yugoslavia in 1963.

Final – 6 February 1965
| R/O | Broadcaster | Artist | Song | Points | Place |
|---|---|---|---|---|---|
| 1 | (Socialist Republic of Bosnia and Herzegovina) RTV Sarajevo | Vice Vukov | "Čežnja" | 16 | 1 |
| 2 | (Socialist Republic of Slovenia) RTV Ljubljana | Marjana Deržaj | "Škrat pri klavirju" | 0 | 12 |
| 3 | (Socialist Republic of Macedonia) RTV Skopje | Đorđe Marjanović | "Proletni vetre" | 6 | 4 |
| 4 | (Socialist Republic of Bosnia and Herzegovina) RTV Sarajevo | Mara Popović & Trio Ivanović | "Osjećam se sam" | 0 | 12 |
| 5 | (Socialist Republic of Serbia) RTV Belgrade | Vice Vukov | "Putuju dani i reke" | 5 | 7 |
| 6 | (Socialist Republic of Croatia) RTV Zagreb | Gabi Novak | "Prvi snijeg" | 9 | 2 |
| 7 | (Socialist Republic of Slovenia) RTV Ljubljana | Marjana Deržaj | "To je moj zlati sin" | 3 | 10 |
| 8 | (Socialist Republic of Serbia) RTV Belgrade | Đorđe Marjanović | "Stari kraj" | 6 | 4 |
| 9 | (Socialist Republic of Croatia) RTV Zagreb | Lado Leskovar | "Sonata" | 0 | 12 |
| 10 | (Socialist Republic of Serbia) RTV Belgrade | Lado Leskovar | "Vetar s planine" | 5 | 7 |
| 11 | (Socialist Republic of Macedonia) RTV Skopje | Vice Vukov | "Leni" | 5 | 7 |
| 12 | (Socialist Republic of Macedonia) RTV Skopje | Vice Vukov | "O, drugar moj" | 3 | 10 |
| 13 | (Socialist Republic of Slovenia) RTV Ljubljana | Marjana Deržaj | "Vzemi moj nasmeh" | 6 | 4 |
| 14 | (Socialist Republic of Serbia) RTV Belgrade | Krsta Petrović | "U moru bih spavao" | 8 | 3 |

== At Eurovision ==
The contest was broadcast on Televizija Beograd, Televizija Zagreb, and Televizija Ljubljana.

Vice Vukov performed 17th on the night of the Contest following Finland and preceding Switzerland. At the close of the voting the song had received 2 points, coming 12th in the field of 18 competing countries.

=== Voting ===
Points awarded to Yugoslavia
| Score | Country |
|---|---|
| 5 points | |
| 3 points | |
| 1 point | France; Portugal |

Points awarded by Yugoslavia
| Score | Country |
|---|---|
| 5 points | France |
| 3 points | Ireland |
| 1 point | Monaco |
