= Guy Mardel =

French singer (born 1944)

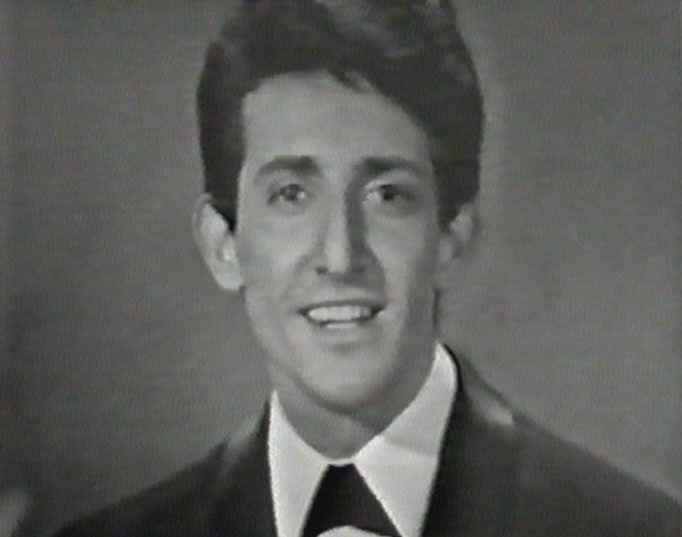
- Guy Mardel at Eurovision

Background information
- Born: Mardochée Elkoubi; 30 June 1944 (age 81)
- Origin: Oran, French Algeria
- Genres: Pop, Chanson
- Occupation: Singer

Guy Mardel (French pronunciation: [gi maʁdɛl], born Mardochée Elkoubi; 30 June 1944, in Oran, French Algeria) is a French singer, best known for his participation in the 1965 Eurovision Song Contest.

Mardel lived his first 15 years in Algeria before moving to France in 1959. He later enrolled in law school, while singing recreationally with a jazz band. He signed a contract with AZ Records in 1963 and released two singles before being chosen internally by channel ORTF in 1965 to represent France in that year's Eurovision Song Contest with the song "N'avoue jamais" ("Never admit"). At the contest, held in Naples on 20 March, "N'avoue jamais" finished in third place of the 18 entries. The single record was reportedly sold 400 000 times.

Mardel was unable to capitalise on his Eurovision success, despite releasing many singles until the 1980s. In the 1970s he moved into record production, setting up his own record label, MM, in 1977. Mardel now lives in Jerusalem.

Preceded by Rachel with Le Chant de Mallory	France in the Eurovision Song Contest; 1965	Succeeded by Dominique Walter with Chez nous
