= Norway in the Eurovision Song Contest 1965 =

- Eurovision Song Contest 1965
- Participating broadcaster: Norsk rikskringkasting (NRK)
- Country: Norway
- Selection process: Melodi Grand Prix 1965
- Selection date: 13 February 1965

Competing entry
- Song: "Karusell"
- Artist: Kirsti Sparboe
- Songwriter: Jolly Kramer-Johansen

Placement
- Final result: 13th, 1 point

Participation chronology

Norway was represented at the Eurovision Song Contest 1965 with the song "Karusell", written by Jolly Kramer-Johansen, and performed by Kirsti Sparboe. The Norwegian participating broadcaster, Norsk rikskringkasting (NRK), organised the national final Melodi Grand Prix 1965 in order to select its entry for the contest. This was the first of Sparboe's three Eurovision appearances for Norway.

== Before Eurovision ==
=== Melodi Grand Prix 1965 ===
Norsk rikskringkasting (NRK) held the Melodi Grand Prix 1965 at its studios in Oslo, hosted by Odd Grythe. Five songs took part in the final with each song sung twice by different singers, once with a small combo and once with a full orchestra. However Wenche Myhre, who had been due to perform a version of "Karusell", had to withdraw at the last minute through illness so Sparboe sang both versions of the song. The winning song was chosen by postcard voting.

The national final was broadcast on NRK Fjernsynet and NRK.

MGP - 13 February 1965
R/O	Artist 1 (Combo)	Artist 2 (Orchestra)	Song	Votes	Place
1	Nora Brockstedt	Grynet Molvig	"Med lokk og lur"	5,104	2
2	Jan Høiland	Per Asplin	"Jeg har en øy"	404	5
3	Kirsti Sparboe	Kirsti Sparboe	"Karusell"	9,886	1
4	Per Asplin	Ivar Medaas	"Jenteord"	1,349	4
5	Grynet Molvig	Nora Brockstedt	"Bare det aller, aller beste"	1,544	3

== At Eurovision ==
On the night of the final Sparboe performed 7th in the running order, following Austria and preceding Belgium. Each national jury awarded 5-3-1 to their top three songs, and at the close "Karusell" had picked up only 1 point (from Austria), placing Norway joint 13th (with Portugal) of the 18 entries. The Norwegian jury awarded its 5 points to the Netherlands.

=== Voting ===
Points awarded to Norway
Score	Country
5 points	
3 points	
1 point	Austria

Points awarded by Norway
Score	Country
5 points	Netherlands
3 points	Luxembourg
1 point	United Kingdom
