= Belgium in the Eurovision Song Contest 1965 =

- Eurovision Song Contest 1965
- Participating broadcaster: Belgische Radio- en Televisieomroep (BRT)
- Country: Belgium
- Selection process: Nationale Finale Songfestival
- Selection date: 13 February 1965

Competing entry
- Song: "Als het weer lente is"
- Artist: Lize Marke
- Songwriters: Jef van den Berg; Jaak Dreesen

Placement
- Final result: 15th, 0 points

Participation chronology

Belgium was represented at the Eurovision Song Contest 1965 with the song "Als het weer lente is", composed by Jef van den Berg, with lyrics by Jaak Dreesen, and performed by Lize Marke. The Belgian participating broadcaster, Dutch-speaking Belgische Radio- en Televisieomroep (BRT), selected its entry through a national final, after having previously selected the performer internally. Marke had previously finished second in the 1963 national final.

There was a minor controversy after the selection when it came to light that "Als het weer lente is" had previously been performed on television (by the following year's Belgian representative Tonia), but after some deliberation BRT decided not to disqualify the song, as none of the rules of the European Broadcasting Union in effect at the time regarding song selection had been broken.

== Before Eurovision ==
=== Artist selection ===
In December 1964, Dutch-speaking broadcaster Belgische Radio- en Televisieomroep (BRT) announced that they had internally selected Lize Marke to represent Belgium in the Eurovision Song Contest 1965.

=== Nationale Finale Songfestival ===
Nationale Finale Songfestival was the national final format developed by BRT in order to select the Belgian entry for the Eurovision Song Contest 1965.

==== Competing entries ====
Following the announcement of Marke as Belgian representative, a song submission period was opened, in which composers were able to submit their songs until 10 January 1965. BRT received 250 songs by the closing of the deadline, from which six were selected for the national final. The national final originally had eight songs, but two of them were dropped before rehearsals for unknown reasons.

Competing entries
Song	Songwriter(s)	
Song	Composer(s)	Lyricist(s)
"Als het weer lente is"	Jef Van den Berg	Jaak Dreesen
~~"Daar zong een herderinneke"~~	Unknown	
~~"Een nieuwe dag"~~	~~Jef Van den Berg~~	~~Will Ferdy~~
"Een wereld zonder jou"	Hans Flower	Louis Baret
"Jij alleen"	Jacques Raymond	Gilbert De Clerck
"Jij bent onmisbaar"	Armand van Steyvoort	
"Regenlied"	Nico Gomez, Peter Loland	Alice Toen, Jo Leemans
"Zoals"	Jef Van den Berg	Will Ferdy

==== Final ====
The final was held on 13 February 1965 at 20:50 CET at the Amerikaans Theater in Brussels and was hosted by Nand Baert. Six songs competed in the contest with the winner being decided upon by a 20-member jury, 10 members of which were "professionals", while another 10 were representatives of the Dutch-speaking public.

R/O	Song	Points	Place
1	"Als het weer lente is"	317	1
2	"Regenlied"	277	3
3	"Een wereld zonder jou"	285	2
4	"Jij alleen"	249	6
5	"Jij bent onmisbaar"	266	5
6	"Zoals"	270	4

== At Eurovision ==
On the evening of the final Marke performed 8th in the running order, following Norway and preceding Monaco. Voting was by each national jury awarding 5, 3 and 1 points to its three favourite songs. At the close of the voting "Als het weer lente is" was one of four songs (along with the entries from Finland, Germany, and Spain) which had failed to register a single point. This was the third time that Belgium had found itself at the foot of the Eurovision scoreboard, and the second (and to date last) time the country had finished with nul-points.

The Belgian jury vote was unique under this system, as only two songs had received any votes at all from the 10 jury members. Under the rules then in effect, this meant that they awarded 6 points (rather than the apparent maximum 5) to the United Kingdom and 3 points to Italy.

The contest was broadcast on BRT and RTB. It was also broadcast on radio station Premier Programme.

=== Voting ===
Belgium did not receive any points at the Eurovision Song Contest 1965.

Points awarded by Belgium
Score	Country
6 points	United Kingdom
3 points	Italy
