= Ingvar Wixell =

Swedish baritone

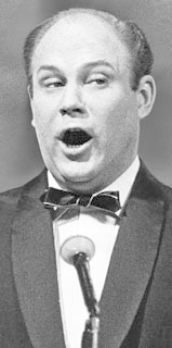
- Ingvar Wixell at the 1965 Melodifestivalen with the song "Absent Friend".

Background information
- Born: Karl Gustaf Ingvar Wixell; 7 May 1931; Luleå, Sweden
- Died: 8 October 2011 (aged 80) Malmö, Sweden
- Genres: Opera
- Occupation: Singer
- Years active: 1955–2003

Karl Gustaf Ingvar Wixell (7 May 1931 – 8 October 2011) was a Swedish baritone who had an active international career in operas and concerts from 1955 to 2003. He mostly sang roles from the Italian repertory, and, according to The New York Times, "was best known for his steady-toned, riveting portrayals of the major baritone roles of Giuseppe Verdi — among them Rigoletto, Simon Boccanegra, Amonasro in Aida, and Germont in La traviata". He was the Swedish entrant in the Eurovision Song Contest 1965.

== Life and career ==
Ingvar Wixell was born in Luleå in 1931. After studies at the Stockholm Academy of Music, he made his debut in Gävle in 1952, then in 1955 as Papageno in Mozart's The Magic Flute at the Royal Swedish Opera in Stockholm where he was member of the company until 1967.

He made his British debut during the Royal Swedish Opera's visit to the Edinburgh International Festival in 1959. Wixell returned with this company to Royal Opera House in 1960, and sang Guglielmo at Glyndebourne and at the Proms in 1962. For the Royal Opera, London he sang Boccanegra in 1972. In America he appeared at Chicago Lyric Opera (Belcore, 1967) and the Metropolitan Opera (Rigoletto, 1973).

He was engaged at the Deutsche Oper Berlin in 1967 where he was a member for more than 30 years. At Salzburg he sang a noted Pizarro at the Festival, where he appeared from 1966 to 1969, and at Bayreuth he sang the Herald in Lohengrin (1971).

Among other roles, Wixell sang Figaro in Rossini's The Barber of Seville, Escamillo in Bizet's Carmen, Amonasro in Verdi's Aida, Baron Scarpia in Puccini's Tosca, and the title roles in Verdi's Rigoletto, Simon Boccanegra, Mozart's Don Giovanni, Verdi's Falstaff and Tchaikovsky's Eugene Onegin.

Wixell performed all the songs in the competition to select Sweden's Eurovision Song Contest 1965 entry. The winning song was "Annorstädes Vals" (Elsewhere Waltz), which Wixell went on to perform at the international final in Naples. In a break from the then prevailing tradition, the song was sung in English (as "Absent Friend"). This led to the introduction from 1966 onwards of a rule stipulating that each country's entry must be sung in one of the languages of that country.

In 1991, he was awarded the Illis quorum by the government of Sweden.

Wixell ended his career in 2003 by singing the Music teacher in Richard Strauss's Ariadne auf Naxos at Malmö Opera.

Wixell died in Malmö on 8 October 2011, aged 80, survived by his wife, Margareta, and his two daughters, Marit and Jette.

== Selected recordings ==
- Mozart, Count Almaviva in The Marriage of Figaro, conducted by Sir Colin Davis, 1971, with Jessye Norman
- Larsson, Förklädd gud, conducted by Stig Westerberg, 1968–1974
- Mozart, Don Giovanni, conducted by Colin Davis, 1973
- Verdi, Cavaliere di Belfiore in Un giorno di regno, conducted by Lamberto Gardelli, 1973
- Puccini, Baron Scarpia in Tosca, conducted by Colin Davis, 1976, with Montserrat Caballé
- Verdi, Count di Luna in Il trovatore, conducted by Richard Bonynge, 1976, with Dame Joan Sutherland and Marilyn Horne
- Donizetti, Belcore in L'elisir d'amore, conducted by Sir John Pritchard, 1977, with Plácido Domingo
- Donizetti, Don Alfonso in Lucrezia Borgia, conducted by Richard Bonynge, 1977
- Leoncavallo, Tonio in Pagliacci, conducted by Giuseppe Patanè, 1977, with Mirella Freni
- Puccini, Michele in Il tabarro, conducted by Lorin Maazel, with Renata Scotto, 1977
- Puccini, Sharpless in Madama Butterfly, conducted by Lorin Maazel, 1978, with Renata Scotto, Plácido Domingo and Gillian Knight
- Verdi, Renato in Un ballo in maschera, conducted by Colin Davis, 1978–1979, with José Carreras
- Puccini, Marcello in La bohème, conducted by Colin Davis, 1979, with Katia Ricciarelli
- Sjöberg, Fridas Visor, conducted by Åke Jelving, 1960
- Verdi, Rigoletto in Rigoletto, conducted by Riccardo Chailly, 1983, with Edita Gruberová and Luciano Pavarotti, a film directed by Jean-Pierre Ponnelle
- Puccini, Baron Scarpia in Tosca, conducted by Daniel Oren, 1990, with Raina Kabaivanska
- Svenska ballader (Swedish ballads), by August Söderman, Wilhelm Peterson-Berger, Wilhelm Stenhammar and Ture Rangström, conducted by Johan Arnell, 1997

Preceded by Monica Zetterlund with "En gång i Stockholm"	Sweden in the Eurovision Song Contest; 1965	Succeeded by Lill Lindfors and Svante Thuresson with "Nygammal vals"
