= Marjorie Noël =

French singer (1945–2000)

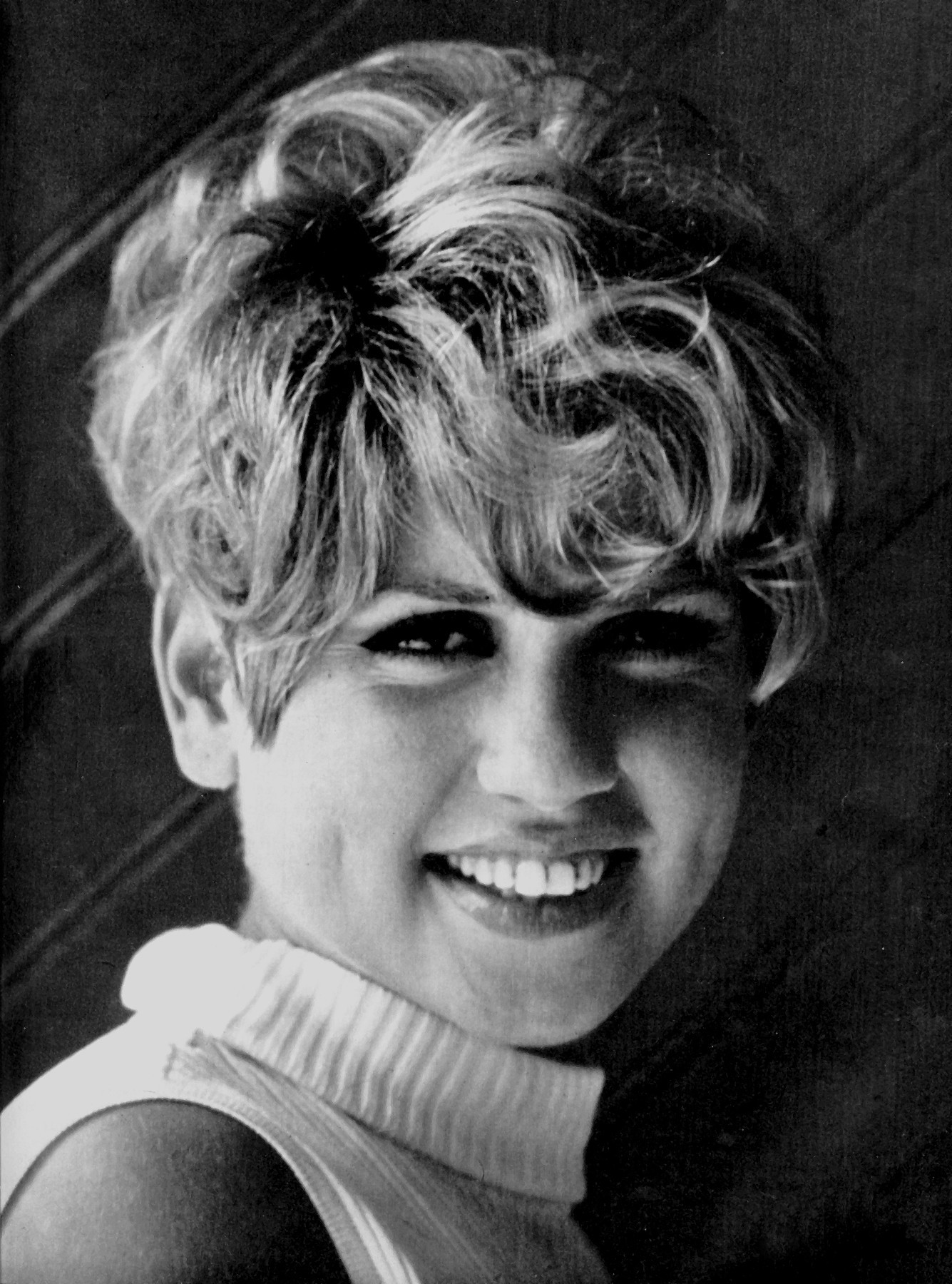
- Noël in 1966
- Born: Françoise Simone Monique Nivot; 29 December 1945; Bayeux, France
- Died: 30 April 2000 (aged 54); Paris, France
- Occupation: Singer
- Works: Marjorie Noël
- Musical career
- Instrument: Vocals
- Years active: 1964–1967

Françoise Simone Monique Nivot (29 December 1945 – 30 April 2000), known professionally as Marjorie Noël (French pronunciation: [maʁʒɔʁi nɔ.ɛl]), was a French singer who had a brief career in the mid-1960s, and is best known for her participation on behalf of Monaco in the Eurovision Song Contest 1965.

Noël was born in Bayeux, France. Her first recordings were released in 1964, and the following year she was invited to represent Monaco in the tenth Eurovision Song Contest, to take place in Naples, Italy on 20 March. The chosen song, "Va dire à l'amour", ended in ninth place out of 18 entries. The single record of "Va dire à l'amour" reportedly sold 20,000 times in France, and 300,000 in Japan. She would later take part in the 1965 La Rose d'Or festival in Antibes, and released in total seven EPs.

Noël retired from showbusiness in 1967 and spent the rest of her life in anonymity. She died of a stroke in Paris, on 30 April 2000, aged 54.

== Discography ==
- 1964: "Tu vas partir"
- 1964: "Si j'étais plus jolie qu'elle"
- 1965: "Va dire à l'amour"
- 1965: "Je te dis mon âge"
- 1965: "Fais attention"
- 1966: "Les portes-clefs"
- 1967: "Au temps des princes charmants"

Awards and achievements
Preceded by Romuald with "Où sont-elles passées ?"	Monaco in the Eurovision Song Contest; 1965	Succeeded by Téréza with "Bien plus fort"
