= United Kingdom in the Eurovision Song Contest 1965 =

- Eurovision Song Contest 1965
- Participating broadcaster: British Broadcasting Corporation (BBC)
- Country: United Kingdom
- Selection process: Artist: Internal selection Song: A Song for Europe 1965
- Selection date: 29 January 1965

Competing entry
- Song: "I Belong"
- Artist: Kathy Kirby
- Songwriters: Peter Lee Sterling; Phil Peters

Placement
- Final result: 2nd, 26 points

Participation chronology

The United Kingdom was represented at the Eurovision Song Contest 1965 with the song "I Belong", composed by Peter Lee Sterling, with lyrics by Phil Peters, and performed by Kathy Kirby. The British participating broadcaster, the British Broadcasting Corporation (BBC), selected its entry through a national final, after having previously selected the performer internally.

At the Eurovision final in Naples, the United Kingdom finished in 2nd place for a record fifth time.

== Before Eurovision ==
=== A Song for Europe 1965 ===
The British Broadcasting Corporation (BBC) held a national preselection to choose the song that would go to the Eurovision Song Contest 1965. It was held on 29 January 1965 and presented by David Jacobs.

The BBC internally selected the singer for the second time. They chose a solo female singer, Kathy Kirby, whose looks were compared to Marilyn Monroe and who had just scored four consecutive top 20 hit singles. The song was then selected by viewers of The Kathy Kirby Show on BBC1, casting votes on postcards via post, with the winner "I Belong", receiving 110,495 votes. Chris Andrews had written one of the six finalists, "One Day" which was recorded by Sandie Shaw with whom he regularly collaborated. Shaw would be the artist selected to represent the United Kingdom at the 1967 contest, when again Andrews submitted a song.

R/O	Song	Songwriter(s)	Votes	Place
1	"I Won't Let You Go"	Tony Hatch	22,567	5
2	"My Only Love"	Tom Springfield	61,993	3
3	"I'll Try Not to Cry"	Les Reed	96,252	2
4	"Sometimes"	Leslie Bricusse	9,678	6
5	"I Belong"	Peter Lee Sterling	110,945	1
6	"One Day"	Chris Andrews	55,156	4

Kirby released all six songs from the UK final on an Extended Play maxi single BBC TV's A Song for Europe, which reached number 9 in the UK EP top 20 chart. She subsequently re-recorded the winner and the runner up with different arrangements and released these tracks on a single, which peaked at number 36 in the UK singles chart.

== At Eurovision ==
"I Belong" won the national and went on to come 2nd in the contest.

At the Eurovision final the BBC TV commentary was provided by David Jacobs with David Gell providing the domestic BBC radio commentary. Ian Fenner provided radio commentary for British Forces Radio.

=== Voting ===
Points awarded to the United Kingdom
Score	Country
6 points	Belgium
5 points	Denmark; Spain; Switzerland
3 points	Sweden
1 point	Italy; Norway

Points awarded by the United Kingdom
Score	Country
5 points	Monaco
3 points	Austria
1 point	Italy
