= Portugal in the Eurovision Song Contest 1965 =

- Eurovision Song Contest 1965
- Participating broadcaster: Radiotelevisão Portuguesa (RTP)
- Country: Portugal
- Selection process: Grande Prémio TV da Canção Portuguesa 1965
- Selection date: 6 February 1965

Competing entry
- Song: "Sol de inverno"
- Artist: Simone de Oliveira
- Songwriters: Carlos Nóbrega e Sousa; Jerónimo Bragança

Placement
- Final result: 13th, 1 point

Participation chronology

Portugal was represented at the Eurovision Song Contest 1965 with the song "Sol de inverno", composed by Carlos Nóbrega e Sousa, with lyrics by Jerónimo Bragança, and performed by Simone de Oliveira. The Portuguese participating broadcaster, Radiotelevisão Portuguesa (RTP), selected its entry at the Grande Prémio TV da Canção Portuguesa 1965.

== Before Eurovision ==
=== Grande Prémio TV da Canção Portuguesa 1965 ===
Radiotelevisão Portuguesa (RTP) held the Grande Prémio TV da Canção Portuguesa 1965 on 6 February 1965 at 21:55 UTC in its Lumiar studios in Lisbon, hosted by Henrique Mendes. Eight songs took part in the final. Fernando de Carvalho conducted orchestra for all the songs. The winning song was chosen by a distrital jury, composed by three members, each had 5 votes to be distributed among the songs it intended to award, making a total of 15 votes per district.

Grande Prémio TV da Canção Portuguesa - 6 February 1965
R/O	Artist	Song	Votes	Place
1	António Calvário	"Por causa do mar"	13	6
2	Simone de Oliveira	"Silhuetas ao luar"	28	4
3	Artur Garcia	"Nasci, sonhei, cresci e amei"	18	5
4	António Calvário	"Você não vê"	2	8
5	Madalena Iglésias	"Silêncio entre nós"	46	3
6	Artur Garcia	"Amor"	66	2
7	Simone de Oliveira	"Sol de inverno"	91	1
8	António Calvário	"Bom Dia"	6	7

Detailed Distrital Jury Votes
R/O	Song	Aveiro	Beja	Braga	Bragança	Castelo Branco	Coimbra	Évora	Faro	Guarda	Leiria	Lisbon	Portalegre	Porto	Santarém	Setúbal	Viana do Castelo	Vila Real	Viseu	Total
1	"Por causa do mar"			1	1				2			6	1	1	1					13
2	"Silhuetas ao luar"	1				4	1	3	4	1	2				2	1	3		6	28
3	"Nasci, sonhei, cresci e amei"	4		3	3		2				2		1		3					18
4	"Você não vê"														1				1	2
5	"Silêncio entre nós"	1	1	4	3			2	1	4		3	11		6			9	1	46
6	"Amor"	9	11	4	5	5		8	7	3	2		2	2	1		2	4	1	66
7	"Sol de inverno"		2	3	2	6	12		1	6	9	6		12	1	14	10	1	6	91
8	"Bom Dia"		1		1			2		1								1		6

== At Eurovision ==
On the night of the final Oliveira performed 12th in the running order, following France and preceding Italy. Each national jury awarded 5-3-1 to their top three songs, and at the close "Sol de inverno" had picked up only 1 point (from Monaco), placing Portugal joint 13th (with Norway) of the 18 entries. The Portuguese jury awarded its 5 points to Austria.

The orchestra during the Portuguese entry was conducted by Fernando de Carvalho.

=== Voting ===
Points awarded to Portugal
Score	Country
5 points	
3 points	
1 point	Monaco

Points awarded by Portugal
Score	Country
5 points	Austria
3 points	Ireland
1 point	Yugoslavia
