= RAI Production Center, Naples =

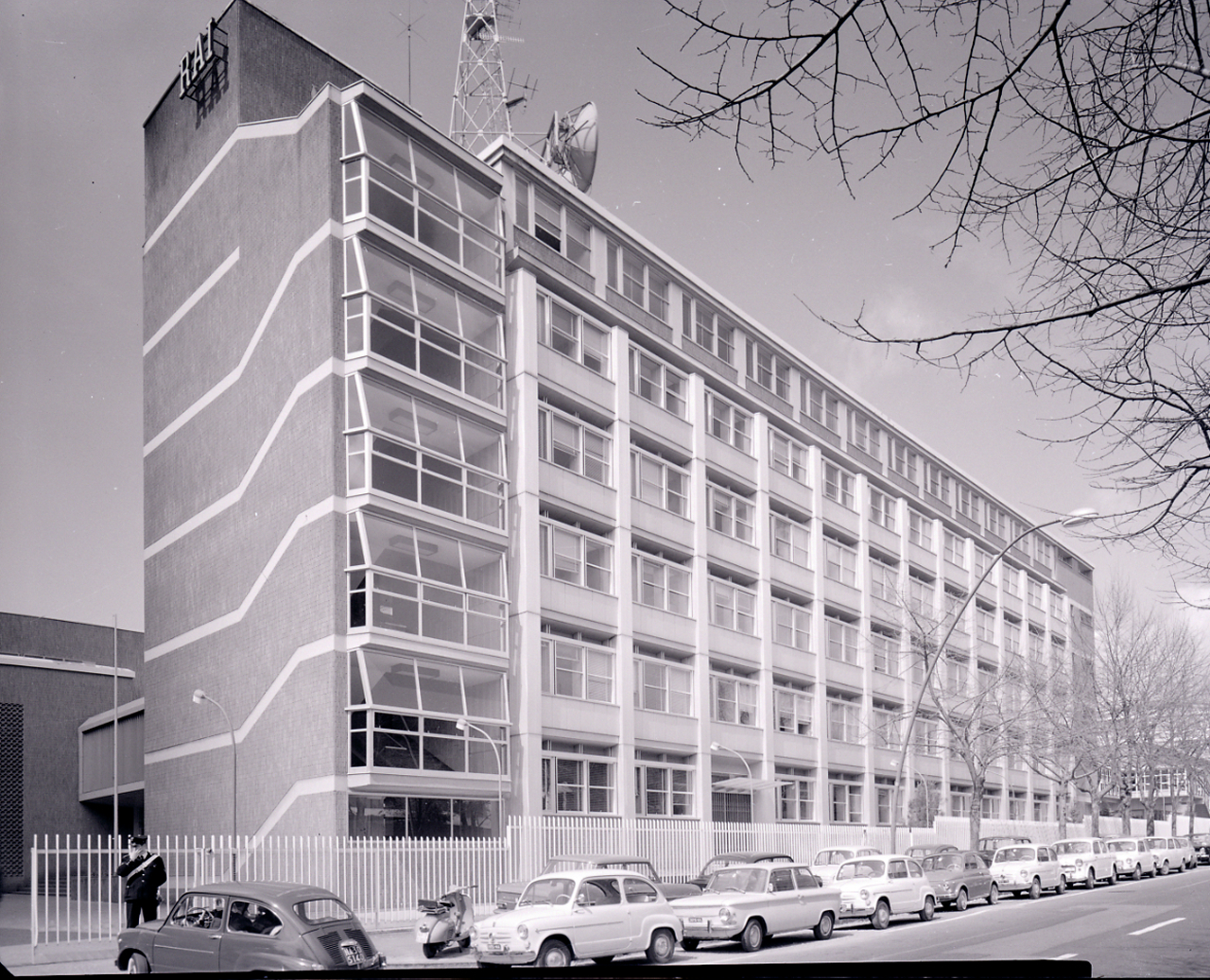
- The production center in 1966
- Interactive map of the RAI Production Center, Naples area

General information
- Type: Broadcasting Center
- Location: Fuorigrotta, Naples, Italy
- Coordinates: 40°49′37.21″N 14°11′22″E
- Inaugurated: 7 March 1963; 63 years ago
- Owner: RAI

RAI's production center in Naples (Italian: Centro di produzione Rai di Napoli) is one of four regional television and radio production centers belonging to the Italian public broadcaster RAI. The center is located in Naples in southern Italy, while the other three production centers are located in Rome, Milan and Turin. Construction began in the late 1950s, and the center was opened on 7 March 1963 by Prime Minister Amintore Fanfani.

== Venue and facilities ==
The center is located on Via Guglielmo Marconi near to San Paolo Stadium, in the Fuorigrotta district of Naples. The center has six TV studios with a total space of 1,227 square meters and room for 370 spectators. The studios are used to produce television programs, debates, drama series and soap operas which are then broadcast on the broadcaster Rai's channels.

The center's largest facility is the Auditorium Rai di Napoli, a concert hall with around 1,000 seats designed by artcitects Renato Avolio De Martino, Mario De Renzi and Raffaele Contigiani. The hall has a floor area of 800 square meters, and on the stage there is a large pipe organ. Rai has produced and recorded a number of radio and television concerts in the hall, including the 1965 Eurovision Song Contest. After a renovation of the auditorium in the 2000s by the Neapolitan studio Gnosis Architettura, the number of seats was reduced to 600 and the organ was renovated.

The center also houses the historical archives of the Canzone Napoletana, the traditional form of music performed in the local Neapolitan language. The archive contains over 50,000 classical Neapolitan songs.

== Bibliography ==
- Rai Eri (2007). La fabbrica televisiva. La RAI a Napoli. ISBN 8839714286.

Preceded by Tivolis Koncertsal; Copenhagen	Eurovision Song Contest; Venue; 1965	Succeeded by Villa Louvigny; Luxembourg City
