= Viktor Klimenko (singer) =

Viktor Savvich Klimenko
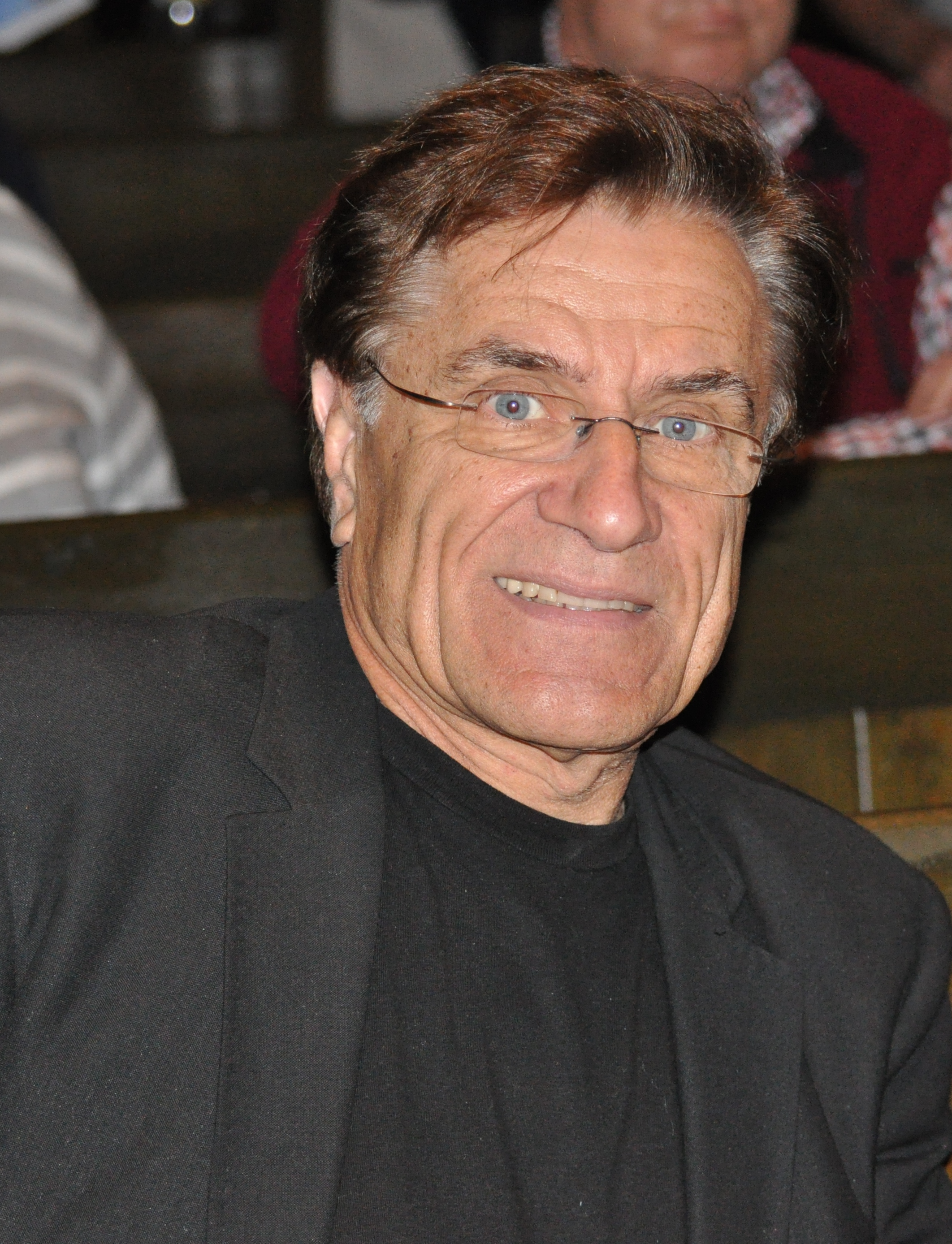
- Viktor Klimenko in 2011.

Background information
- Born: 24 November 1942 (age 83); Occupied Karelia
- Origin: Finland
- Genres: Gospel music
- Occupations: Singer, actor
- Years active: 1965–present
- Website: web.archive.org/web/20040603144938/http://www.viktorklimenko.com/english/index.html

Viktor Savvich Klimenko (born 24 November 1942) is a singer who made himself known as the "Singing Cossack".

== Biography ==
Klimenko was born in Karelia, to a Russian Kuban Cossack father, Savva Klimenko, and a Russian mother, Olga Glotova. A few years after his birth, his family moved to Finland. There, he became a musician and appeared in several films, mostly appearing as himself. The Eurovision Song Contest 1965 was his first appearance outside of Finland; his song didn't earn any points in the competition.

In 1970, Klimenko released the album Stenka Rasin across Europe. The album, containing Russian songs, went gold in the Finnish market—the first record to do so in Finland. Later, it was certified platinum. This success was followed by a decade of concerts around the world. Klimenko had nine more gold records and one more platinum record.

In 1973, he played in the Norwegian "comedy-humour-musical" Kofferten (Swedish: Ryck mig i vaskan), a co-operation between Sveriges Radio, BBC, YLE, and NRK.

Klimenko rebranded himself as a Gospel singer in 1980, after having a personal religious revelation.

== Selected filmography ==
- Vodkaa, komisario Palmu (1969)
- Sauna (2008)

Preceded by Lasse Mårtenson with Laiskotellen	Finland in the Eurovision Song Contest; 1965	Succeeded by Ann-Christine with Playboy
