= Denmark in the Eurovision Song Contest 1965 =

- Eurovision Song Contest 1965
- Participating broadcaster: Danmarks Radio (DR)
- Country: Denmark
- Selection process: Internal selection
- Announcement date: 18 February 1965

Competing entry
- Song: "For din skyld"
- Artist: Birgit Brüel
- Songwriters: Jørgen Jersild; Poul Henningsen

Placement
- Final result: 7th, 10 points

Participation chronology

Denmark was represented at the Eurovision Song Contest 1965 with the song "For din skyld", composed by Jørgen Jersild, with lyrics by Poul Henningsen, and performed by Birgit Brüel. The Danish participating broadcaster, Danmarks Radio (DR), internally selected its entry for the contest.

== Before Eurovision ==
=== Internal selection ===
Danmarks Radio (DR) held its internal selection on 18 February at the Studio 2 of Radiohuset in Copenhagen.

Internal selection – 18 February 1965
R/O	Artist	Song	Place
1	Birgit Brüel	"For din skyld"	1
2	Birgit Brüel	"Drømmefloden"	—N/a
3	Birgit Brüel	"Først nu"	—N/a
4	Bjørn Tidmand	"Forårsvise"	—N/a
5	Poul Bundgaard	"Erindring"	—N/a
6	Otto Brandenburg	"At give dig gaver"	—N/a
7	Daimi Gentle	"Hele verdens Jenka"	—N/a
8	Birthe Wilke	"Som du er"	—N/a

== At Eurovision ==
On the evening of the final Brüel performed 14th in the running order, following Italy and preceding eventual contest winners Luxembourg. In what is often considered the first contest in which a majority of the participants had attempted to submit songs in a style which could pass for contemporary music, "For din skyld" was conspicuous as an exceptionally plain, old-fashioned ballad. However, to the surprise of many, the song picked up two maximum five points votes from Luxembourg and Sweden, potentially due to its obvious feminist message. This was enough to place Denmark seventh of the 18 entries. The Danish jury awarded its five points to the United Kingdom.

The contest was televised on DR TV.

=== Voting ===
Points awarded to Denmark
Score	Country
5 points	Luxembourg; Sweden
3 points	
1 point	

Points awarded by Denmark
Score	Country
5 points	United Kingdom
3 points	Sweden
1 point	Luxembourg
