= Ulla Wiesner =

German singer (born 1940)

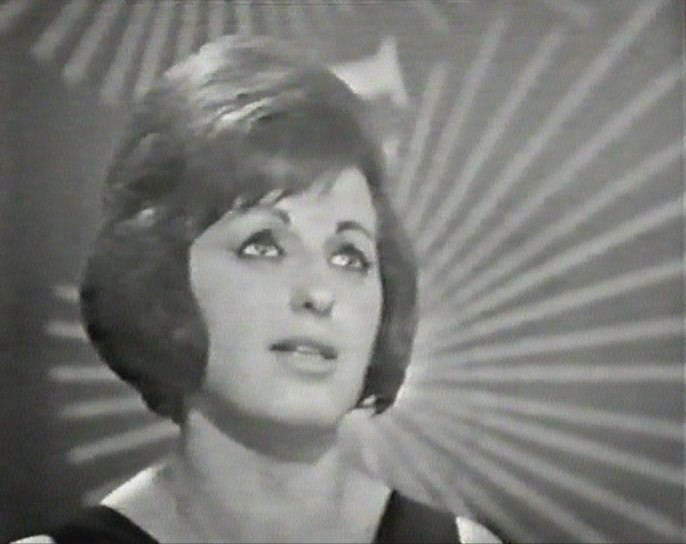
Eurovision Song Contest 1965 - Ulla Wiesner

Ulla Wiesner (born 12 December 1940) is a German singer who was active from 1963 to 2002.

In 1965, she represented West Germany in the Eurovision Song Contest, with "Paradies, wo bist du?" (Paradise, where are you?). The song scored zero points along with three other countries out of the total of eighteen countries that entered the contest. Other than the Eurovision Song Contest, where her zero-point result hurt her solo career before it had even fully begun, she was mainly active with the Botho-Lucas-Chorus, where she stayed as chorister for 30 years, notable for their musical accompaniment on the German TV show Musik ist Trumpf.

Wiesner is also the vocalist on several songs in the Brilliant-Musik archives, founded by Werner Tautz, who wrote several songs for her together with Heinz Kiessling and Hans Gerig. Wiesner released an album called Twilight Mood in 1970 with Addy Flor and his Orchestra. As one of Germany's busiest studio singers, she was assigned as backing vocalist for many popular artists, including Triumvirat's album Illusions on a Double Dimple in 1974. Since then, notable singles of hers include "Abends kommen die Sterne" ("In the evening the stars appear"), "Wenn dieser Tag zu Ende geht" ("When this day comes to an end") and "Charade".

== Personal life ==
Wiesner married the German TV producer and personality Alexander Arnz (1932–2004) in 1999.

== Discography ==
=== Singles ===
- 1964: "Charade" / "Joe oder Jonny"
- 1964: "Abends kommen die Sterne" / "Der rote Mohn"
- 1965: "Paradies, wo bist du?" / "Sag, weißt du denn, was Liebe ist?" (Love Is a Many-splendored Thing)
- 1965: "Wenn dieser Tag zu Ende geht" / "My Darling, My Love"
- 1967: "Das Wunder der Liebe" / "Mann der Träume" (Goin’ Out of My Head)
- 1973: "Blütenfest in Santa Fé" / "Träume von gestern" (reissued in 1980)
- 1974: "Chico de favella" (Fio Maravilla) / "Tristezza"
- 1975: "Tanz keinen Tango mit Django" / "Ich bin ein total moderner Typ" (Charleston)
- 1993: "Haut an Haut" / "Im Wartesaal zum großen Glück" / "Geh’ Deinen Weg" / "Die große Freiheit" / "Wiedermal verliebt"

=== Other releases ===
Album names in parentheses:

- 1964: Abends kommen die Sterne (Die große POLYDOR-Starparade)
- 1970: Vergessen und vorbei / So lang' die Welt sich für uns dreht / Sommer in Paris / Dieses Jahr (Die Orchester Addy Flor und Pete Jacques – Twilight Mood)
- Sprich dich mal Aus (Deutsche Schlagerparade)
- Niemandsland (Erwin Lehn und sein Südfunk-Orchester)
- 1990: Paradies, wo bist du? (Die Sieger des deutschen Grand Prix - 1956 - 1990)
- 1999: Dieses Jahr (Snowflakes)
- 1999: Die Träume von gestern (25 Schlager Mit Herz Folge 1)
- 2000: Vergessen und vorbei (Days of Summer: 27 Sensational Bossa Nova and Easy Tunes from the Brilliant-Musik Archive)
- 2001: Paradies, wo bist du? (Alle Sieger des deutschen Grand Prix 1956 - 2000)
- 2004: Charade / Joe oder Jonny (Vinyl Raritäten 13)
- 2006: Sommer in Paris / Dieses Jahr / Vergessen und vorbei (Days of Summer: 24 Dreamy Vocals & Bossa Nova Pearls)
- 2012: Träume von gestern (Träume von gestern)

== Collaboration ==
- 1974 : Illusions on a Double Dimple by Triumvirat
