= Ireland in the Eurovision Song Contest 1965 =

- Eurovision Song Contest 1965
- Participating broadcaster: Radio Éireann (RÉ)
- Country: Ireland
- Selection process: National Song Contest
- Selection date: 9 February 1965

Competing entry
- Song: "I'm Walking the Streets in the Rain"
- Artist: Butch Moore
- Songwriters: Teresa Conlon; Joe Harrigan; George Prendergast

Placement
- Final result: 6th, 11 points

Participation chronology

Ireland was represented at the Eurovision Song Contest 1965 with the song "I'm Walking the Streets in the Rain", composed by Joe Harrigan and George Prendergast, with lyrics by Teresa Conlon, and performed by Butch Moore. The Irish participating broadcaster, Radio Éireann (RÉ), selected its entry through a national final. This was the first-ever entry from Ireland in the Eurovision Song Contest.

== Before Eurovision ==
=== National Song Contest ===
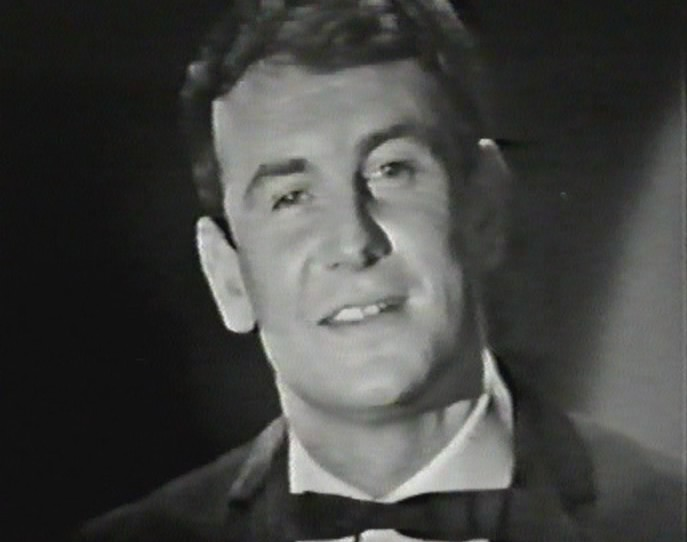
Butch Moore at Eurovision

On Tuesday 9 February 1965, Radio Éireann (RÉ) held the first edition of the National Song Contest at its studios in Dublin, hosted by Bunny Carr. Twelve songs took part, with the winner chosen by voting from six regional juries. Other participants included future Irish representative Dickie Rock (1966).

R/O	Artist	Song	Place
1	(Note: Additional artists were Austin Gaffney and Terri Nerney. The song they each sung is unknown.)	"House on the Hill"	
2	Paul Russell	"Concerto of Love"	
3	Joan Connolly	"Another Star, Another Tear"	3
4	Dickie Rock	"I Still Love You"	7
5	John Keogh	"Yesterday's Dream"	3
6	Brendan Bowyer	"Suddenly In Love"	5
7	Frances McDermott	"Another Day, Another Dream"	6
8	Patricia Cahill	"I Stand Still"	2
9		"On Such a Night"	
10	Butch Moore	"I'm Walking the Streets in the Rain"	1
11	Amy Hayden	"You Said You Loved Me"	
12	Jim Doherty Trio	"Love Me Truly"	

== At Eurovision ==
The contest was broadcast on Telefís Éireann with commentary by Bunny Carr, and on Radió Éireann.

Ireland performed 4th at the beginning of the start field. Ireland finished 6th with 11 points.

=== Voting ===
Points awarded to Ireland
Score	Country
5 points	Italy
3 points	Portugal; Yugoslavia
1 point	

Points awarded by Ireland
Score	Country
5 points	Austria
3 points	Luxembourg
1 point	France
