= RTVE Canarias =

RTVE Canarias is the production center of Radiotelevisión Española (RTVE) located in the Canary Islands. The center is in charge of the local programming of Televisión Española (TVE) and Radio Nacional de España (RNE), broadcast to the archipelago through their television channels and radio stations in regional variation, and of the news coverage of the region for the central news services. TVE's production center was inaugurated in 1964 and operated autonomously until 1971. RNE began broadcasting in the Canaries also in 1964.

Currently, RTVE Canarias has two production centers, one in Las Palmas de Gran Canaria and another in Santa Cruz de Tenerife, as well as newsrooms and a network of collaborators on the five remaining islands. Among its best-known television programs are the regional newscast Telecanarias and folkloric programs such as Tenderete. The headquarters and management are located at Las Palmas. All regional television and radio programs are available on RTVE Play.

== History ==
The Canary Islands were one of the last regions in Spain where the television arrived. At the beginning of the 1960s, the installation of the Televisión Española (TVE) territorial center at Casa del Marino in Las Palmas de Gran Canaria began and repeaters and other centers were developed later in the rest of the islands. Finally, at 7:00 p.m. on 12 February 1964, TVE began its television regular broadcasts to the archipelago. On 18 July 1964, Radio Nacional de España (RNE) began its radio test broadcasts from the Casino of Santa Cruz de Tenerife, with regular broadcasts beginning on 20 September.

From 1964 to 1971, TVE Canarias operated autonomously since there was no television link with peninsular Spain. Due to the distance and transportation difficulties, national programs arrived from Madrid by plane on tape and were broadcast on a delayed basis, days late. This forced the Canarian production center to develop its own programming, linked to local current affairs, with regional newscast, folklore programs, sports, and local entertainment.

On 25 April 1971, TVE Canarias' television signal began to broadcast to the archipelago the live signal of TVE's first channel received from Prado del Rey through the recently launched Intelsat IV F-2 satellite. The production center continued to produce local programming that was broadcast in regional variation on the channel. On 26 April 1971, TVE Canarias premiered locally the daily newscast Telecanarias, and on 7 September 1971, the weekly folkloric music show Tenderete. Both programs are still on the air, making them the second and third longest-running television programs in the history of television in Spain, just behind the national daily newscast Telediario. On 20–22 May 1971, TVE made its first live transmissions from the Canary Islands to the whole of Spain, broadcasting nationwide the 6th Atlantic Song Festival held in Puerto de la Cruz.

Connections between islands were improved, color television was introduced in 1976, and TVE inaugurated its production center in Santa Cruz de Tenerife in 1982. That same year, the archipelago was able to tune in to the live broadcasts of TVE's second channel, on the occasion of the 1982 FIFA World Cup, held in Spain. In 1978, RNE opened its production center in Las Palmas.

The arrival of the second channel caused many Canarian television programming to be moved there. However, TVE's programming in the Canary Islands in both channels maintained notable differences with respect to that of the rest of the country. By the mid-2000s, TVE Canarias had produced more than 200 television programs in more than forty years. The Canarian production centers also covered events such as the Green March in the Sahara, Los Rodeos accident, and all news related to the autonomous community for the central news services of TVE and RNE.

At the beginning of 2006, with the announcement of the restructuring that led to the incorporation of TVE and RNE into the current Radiotelevisión Española (RTVE) corporation on 1 January 2007, there was speculation about the closure of TVE and RNE territorial production centers in the Canary Islands. Finally, the corporation kept them but reduced the staff and the broadcast slots for regional programming, merging the structures of the former independent companies.

On 28 June 2010, RTVE inaugurated its new production facilities in Las Palmas, in a building shared with the EFE agency, where it centralized its television and radio productions and which replaced the old TVE and RNE facilities that had been separated until then.
