= Alf Henrikson =

Swedish author, poet and translator

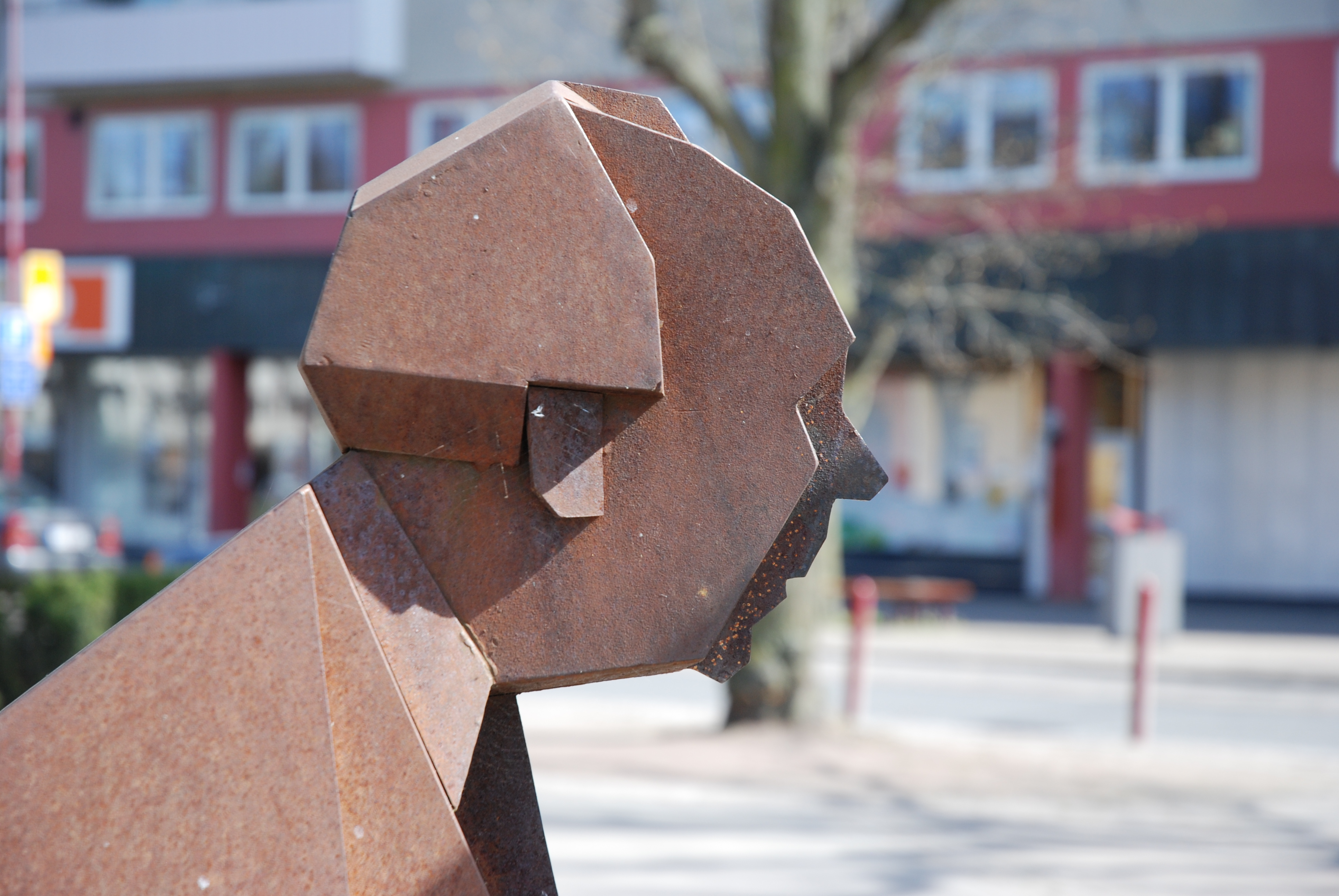
- Steel sculpture of Alf Henrikson
- Born: Alf Ragnar Sten Henrikson; 9 July 1905; Huskvarna, Sweden
- Died: 9 May 1995 (aged 89); Stockholm, Sweden
- Occupations: Author, poet, translator
- Writing career
- Pen name: H
- Notable awards: Litteris et Artibus; 1977

Alf Ragnar Sten Henrikson (9 July 1905 in Huskvarna – 9 May 1995 in Södra Ängby) was a Swedish writer, poet and translator, known for his interest in language and for his broad general knowledge. He wrote a number of books about popular science and history, and for many years he was part of the staff of Dagens Nyheter, where he published short poems about current events or other topics.

== Biography ==
Henrikson was born in Huskvarna, the eldest son of Arvid and Linnéa Henrikson. His father was a clerk at Husqvarna Vapenfabrik, a rifle manufacturer that also produced sewing machines and motorcycles. Alf Henrikson's mother also worked at the factory, where she painted decorative patterns and flowers on sewing machines, prior to her marriage.

Henrikson was a precocious child who learnt to read at an early age, something that was encouraged by his parents as well as his grandparents, who lived with the family. When he was five years old, his brother Stig was born, followed by the youngest sibling, Gerd; she was 13 years younger than Alf.

He studied Latin and Greek at secondary school, and graduated in 1925. When he had finished his military service he wanted to go to Lund university to study Latin, but as his parents could not afford to send him there, he got a job at the newspaper Jönköpings-Posten. In 1929, he was hired by Dagens Nyheter and moved to Stockholm.

Henrikson married Ebba Weck in 1931. They had two sons, Kjell (born 1933) and Lars (born 1938). The family moved to Södra Ängby in the Bromma borough of Stockholm in the mid-1930s, and Henrikson lived there until his death in 1995.

He is buried in Huskvarna.

== Production ==
All in all, over 20,000 of Henrikson's daily poems were published in Dagens Nyheter, some of which have subsequently been published in anthologies. Henrikson also wrote and published a number of other volumes of poetry, and a popular introduction to various metric forms and styles. His style was often humorous but could also be very serious; there were often several layers of meanings in Henrikson's texts.

Henrikson's published production includes over 100 books including collections of poetry, history books retelling the history of, among others, Sweden, Denmark, China, Iceland and ancient Greece and Rome, and a general encyclopedia, which Henrikson started writing at the age of 80. He also translated poetry, opera librettos and other texts from languages including French, English, and Chinese. His translation of the libretto of Mozart's The Magic Flute from German into Swedish in 1968 became a classic, which was also used in Ingmar Bergman's movie version of the opera from 1975.

== Awards and prizes ==
Henrikson received a number of literary and other awards for his writing and his work to further knowledge. Among the most important awards he received are

- Litteris et Artibus (1977)
- Order of Merit of the Italian Republic (1981)
- Vitterhetsakademien's silver medal (1982)

In 1967, he was elected a member of the Royal Swedish Academy of Letters, History and Antiquities (Vitterhetsakademien). In 1968, he was made an honorary doctor by Stockholm university. In 1980, the publishing house Bra Böcker AB created an award in Henrikson's name as a gift for his 75th birthday. Until his death, Henrikson himself chose the recipient of the annual award; after his death, there was a hiatus of a few years before the prize was again awarded, now by the Alf Henrikson Society. The prize sum varies; in 2018 it was 15,000 SEK.
