= Spain in the Eurovision Song Contest 1961 =

- Eurovision Song Contest 1961
- Participating broadcaster: Televisión Española (TVE)
- Country: Spain
- Selection process: National final
- Selection date: 14 February 1961

Competing entry
- Song: "Estando contigo"
- Artist: Conchita Bautista
- Songwriters: Augusto Algueró; Antonio Guijarro

Placement
- Final result: 9th, 8 votes

Participation chronology

Spain was represented at the Eurovision Song Contest 1961 with the song "Estando contigo", composed by Augusto Algueró, with lyrics by Antonio Guijarro, and performed by Conchita Bautista. The Spanish participating broadcaster, Televisión Española (TVE), selected its entry through a national final. The song, performed in position 1, placed ninth out of sixteen competing entries with 8 votes. This was the first-ever entry from Spain in the Eurovision Song Contest, and the first-ever entry performed fully in Spanish in the contest.

== Before Eurovision ==
=== National selection ===
The national selection took place at the studios of Radio Nacional de España (RNE) in Barcelona on 13–14 February 1961, hosted by Federico Gallo, Jorge Arandes, and María del Carmen García Lecha, and was aired through Radio Nacional. Ten songs competed over two shows, with the winning song being decided upon through jury voting.

==== Competing entries ====
Artist	Song	Songwriter(s)
Angelita Baidez	"Tempranito"	José Solá
Conchita Bautista	"Estando contigo"	Augusto Algueró; Antonio Guijarro
Coralito de Jaén	"Con los ojos, no"	Máximo Baratas
Jorge Miranda	"Betsabé"	Manuel Martínez Remis; Roberto García Morillo
José Cercós	"Serenata"	Mario Sellés
Ramón Calduch	"Carita morena"	Jorge Domingo
Ramón Calduch	"Eva María"	Rafael Ramírez
Santy	"La tormenta"	Josep Capell
Santy	"Sigo caminando"	Josefina Güell; Juan José Umbert
Víctor Balaguer	"Ba be bi bu bá"	José Pal Latorre

==== Semi-final ====
The semi-final took place on 13 February 1961. The ten competing songs were presented, and six of these songs went forward to the national final. The jury consisted of ten members, five music experts and five ordinary citizens. The music experts were:

- Sebastià Gasch – Journalist at RNE, writer, art critic
- Diego Ramírez Pastor – Journalist, president of the Barcelona Press Association
- Artur Kaps – Producer at TVE
- Alfonso Banda Moras – Director of current affairs at RNE for Barcelona
- Carlos Moltó Arniches – Delegate of the Sociedad General de Autores de España in Barcelona

The plain citizens were Alberto Rovira, María Amparo Gascón, Carmen Navarro, Joaquina Navarro, and Pilar Agudo Villegas.

Semi-final – 13 February 1961
R/O	Artist	Song	Result
1	Coralito de Jaén	"Con los ojos, no"	—N/a
2	José Cercós	"Serenata"	—N/a
3	Víctor Balaguer	"Ba be bi bu bá"	Qualified
4	Santy	"La tormenta"	—N/a
5	Santy	"Sigo caminando"	—N/a
6	Jorge Miranda	"Betsabé"	Qualified
7	Conchita Bautista	"Estando contigo"	Qualified
8	Angelita Baidez	"Tempranito"	Qualified
9	Ramón Calduch	"Carita morena"	Qualified
10	Ramón Calduch	"Eva María"	Qualified

==== Final ====
The final took place on 14 February 1961, with the same hosts and jury members. The winner was "Estando contigo", composed by Augusto Algueró, with lyrics by Antonio Guijarro, and performed by Conchita Bautista.

Final – 14 February 1961
R/O	Artist	Song	Points	Result
1	Ramón Calduch	"Eva María"	32	4
2	Angelita Baidez	"Tempranito"	13	6
3	Conchita Bautista	"Estando contigo"	49	1
4	Jorge Miranda	"Betsabé"	25	5
5	Víctor Balaguer	"Ba be bi bu bá"	48	2
6	Ramón Calduch	"Carita morena"	43	3

== At Eurovision ==
The Eurovision Song Contest 1961 was held on 18 March 1961 at the Palais des Festivals et des Congrès in Cannes, France. Conchita Bautista performed "Estando contigo" first in the running order, preceding Monaco. Rafael Ferrer conducted the event's orchestra performance of the Spanish entry. At the close of voting the song had received eight votes, placing ninth of the sixteen entries.

TVE broadcast the contest in Spain on its television service with commentary by Federico Gallo. RNE also aired the contest on Radio Nacional.

=== Voting ===
TVE assembled a jury panel with ten members, with each member giving one vote to their favourite song. The following members comprised the Spanish jury:

- Diego Ramírez Pastor – journalist (chairperson)
- Ms. Velayos
- Ms. Agramunt
- Ms. Castell
- Mr. Mendoza Gil
- Mr. Montó
- Mr. Gasa
- Mr. Banda
- Mr. Cuñat
- Artur Kaps – Producer at TVE

The jury awarded its highest mark (3) to the United Kingdom.

Votes awarded to Spain
Score	Country
2 votes	France; Norway
1 vote	Monaco; Netherlands; Sweden; United Kingdom

Votes awarded by Spain
Score	Country
3 votes	United Kingdom
2 votes	France; Luxembourg
1 vote	Monaco; Norway; Switzerland
