= Finland in the Eurovision Song Contest 1965 =

- Eurovision Song Contest 1965
- Participating broadcaster: Yleisradio (Yle)
- Country: Finland
- Selection process: National final
- Selection date: 13 February 1965

Competing entry
- Song: "Aurinko laskee länteen"
- Artist: Viktor Klimenko
- Songwriters: Toivo Kärki; Reino Helismaa

Placement
- Final result: 15th, 0 points

Participation chronology

Finland was represented at the Eurovision Song Contest 1965 with the song "Aurinko laskee länteen", composed by Toivo Kärki, with lyrics by Reino Helismaa, and performed by Viktor Klimenko. The Finnish participating broadcaster, Yleisradio (Yle), selected its entry through a national final.

== Before Eurovision ==
Ten entries were selected for the competition from 111 received submissions. The members of the selection jury were Heikki Annala, George de Godzinsky, Cay Idström, Erkki Melakoski, Kari Rydman, Markku Veijalainen, Lea Venkula, and Aarno Walli. The Finnish national selection composed of a semi final and a final.

=== Semi-final ===
The ten songs were played on radio and television test cards in late January and six finalists were chosen by postcard voting. The winner of the postcard voting was "Minne tuuli kuljettaa" performed by Katri Helena.

Semi-final – 19, 21 & 23 January 1965
R/O	Artist	Song	Songwriter(s)	Votes	Place
1	Marjatta Leppänen	"Iltaisin"	Lasse Mårtenson; Kari Tuomisaari	4,814	6
2	Pentti Lasanen	"Vanha kunnon dixieland"	Åke Granholm	4,112	7
3	Vieno Kekkonen	"Pavane itkevälle neidolle"	Ensio Kosta (Note: Lyricist unknown)	—N/a	
4	Eero and Jussi	"Tahdon saaren"	Erik Lindström; Hillevi	c. 9,000	2
5	Ritva Mustonen	"Lapin taikarummut"	Toivo Kärki; Reino Helismaa	—N/a	3
6	Carola	"Ge mig en grabb"	Lasse Mårtenson; Sauvo Puhtila	—N/a	
7	Viktor Klimenko	"Aurinko laskee länteen"	Toivo Kärki; Reino Helismaa	6,242	4
8	Katri Helena	"Minne tuuli kuljettaa"	Toivo Kärki; Juha Vainio	16,839	1
9	Kai Lind	"Mon amie, mon amour"	Åke Granholm; Sauvo Puhtila	—N/a	5
10	Tamara Lund	"Ota tai jätä"	Rauno Lehtinen; Sauvo Puhtila	—N/a	

=== Final ===
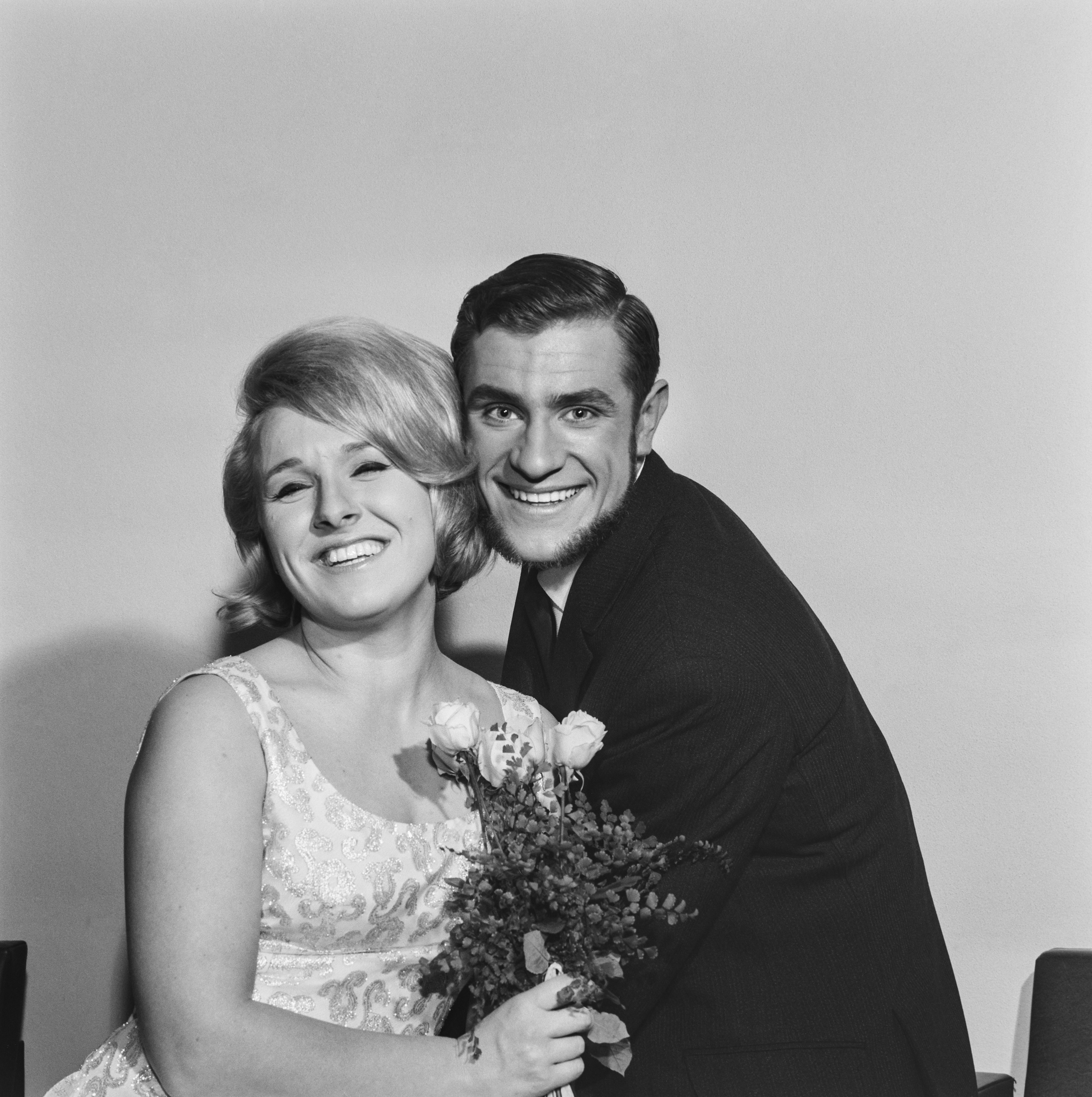
The winner of the regional jury vote, Marjatta Leppänen, and the winner of the Nordic jury vote, Viktor Klimenko

Yleisradio (Yle) held the national final on 13 February 1965 at its studios in Helsinki, hosted by Antti Einiö and Marion Rung. There were two juries, ten regional juries and a Nordic jury. Should both juries have the same favourite, it would be declared the winner. However, the favorite song of regional juries was "Iltaisin" performed by Marjatta Leppänen and of Nordic jury was "Aurinko laskee länteen" by Viktor Klimenko. Therefore the winner was chosen by Yle's administration and they chose "Aurinko laskee länteen" in favour of the Nordic jury.

Each regional jury group consisted of 10 members, and each juror distributed their points as follows: 1, 3 and 5 points.

Final – 13 February 1964
R/O	Artist	Song	Points (Note: Regional jury points)	Place
1	Marjatta Leppänen	"Iltaisin"	210	1
2	Eero and Jussi	"Tahdon saaren"	84	6
3	Ritva Mustonen	"Lapin taikarummut"	93	5
4	Viktor Klimenko	"Aurinko laskee länteen"	195	2
5	Katri Helena	"Minne tuuli kuljettaa"	186	3
6	Kai Lind	"Mon amie, mon amour"	133	4

== At Eurovision ==
On the evening of the final Viktor Klimenko performed 16th in the running order, following Luxembourg and preceding Yugoslavia. The Finnish entry was conducted by George de Godzinsky. Finland did not receive any points in the voting and therefore placed joint last with Spain, Germany and Belgium.

=== Voting ===
Finland did not receive any points at the Eurovision Song Contest 1965.

Points awarded by Finland
Score	Country
5 points	Luxembourg
3 points	Sweden
1 point	France
