= Yo soy aquél =

1966 song by Raphael

Single by Raphael
- Language: Spanish
- A-side: "Yo soy aquél" / "Es verdad"
- B-side: "La noche" / "Hasta Venecia"
- Released: 1966
- Genre: Latin ballad
- Label: Hispavox
- Songwriter: Manuel Alejandro
- Producer: Rafael Trabucchelli

Audio
- "Yo soy aquél" on YouTube

Eurovision Song Contest 1966 entry
- Country: Spain
- Artist: Raphael
- Language: Spanish
- Composer: Manuel Alejandro
- Lyricist: Manuel Alejandro
- Conductor: Rafael Ibarbia

Finals performance
- Final result: 7th
- Final points: 9

Entry chronology
- ◄ "¡Qué bueno, qué bueno!" (1965)
- "Hablemos del amor" (1967) ►

"Yo soy aquél" (Spanish pronunciation: [ˈɟʝo soj aˈkel]; "I am that one"), sometimes spelled as "Yo soy aquel", is a song recorded by Spanish singer Raphael, written by Manuel Alejandro. It represented Spain in the Eurovision Song Contest 1966, placing seventh, and over time it has become one of Raphael's signature songs.

== Background ==
=== Conception ===
Manuel Alejandro wrote several songs for Lucho Gatica, being one of them "Yo soy aquél", but Gatica's team prevented them from meeting. So, Alejandro included the song in the album he was producing for Raphael.

=== Eurovision ===
Televisión Española (TVE) addressed the Sociedad General de Autores de España (SGAE) requesting original songs to participate in the 11th edition of the Eurovision Song Contest, naming nine possible composers as an example, but leaving the SGAE freedom of choice. Since the SGAE did not consider appropriate to choose among its associates, TVE agreed to take into consideration all the works sent to them by SGAE's associated composers. Finally, TVE accepted songs from seven composers, among which "Yo soy aquél" sent by Manuel Alejandro and sung by Raphael was internally selected as its entrant in the contest. The public announcement of the song, singer, and composer selected was done without prior notice in a television broadcast on 14 January 1966, for which TVE had to ask permission from the head of the military garrison where Raphael was doing his compulsory military service, so that he could travel to Prado del Rey for the announcement.

On 5 March 1966, the Eurovision Song Contest was held at Villa Louvigny in Luxembourg hosted by the Compagnie Luxembourgeoise de Télédiffusion (CLT), and broadcast live throughout the continent. Manuel Fraga himself, the Minister of Information and Tourism, on whom TVE depended at that time, had to obtain special permission so that Raphael could leave the garrison for a few days to travel to Luxembourg. He performed "Yo soy aquél" eleventh on the evening, following Sweden's "Nygammal vals" by Lill Lindfors and Svante Thuresson and preceding Switzerland's "Ne vois-tu pas?" by Madeleine Pascal. Rafael Ibarbia made the orchestral arrangement of the Spanish entry and conducted the event's orchestra in its performance.

At the close of voting, "Yo soy aquél" received nine points –five points from Portugal, three from the United Kingdom and one from Yugoslavia–, placing seventh in a field of eighteen, in a tie with Yugoslavia's Berta Ambrož with "Brez Besed". This was the best result for Spain in the contest so far, which led TVE to select Raphael again as its representative at the 1967 contest, where he competed with "Hablemos del amor" placing sixth.

=== Film ===
On 12 December 1966, the film Cuando tú no estás starring Raphael premiered in Spain, in which he sings several songs including "Yo soy aquél". This song and some footage of his performance in this film were later used in the 1997 film Love Can Seriously Damage Your Health to portray one of the protagonists attending a Raphael recital of the time.

== Releases ==
"Yo soy aquél" was released in Spain by Hispavox in a vinyl single along with other three songs. It was subsequently released in different vinyl single editions in Argentina, Bolivia, Brazil, Ecuador, France, Germany, Greece, Italy, Lebanon, Mexico, the Netherlands, Peru, South Africa, Portugal, United Kingdom, United States, Uruguay, and Venezuela by different labels under license from Hispavox. Raphael also recorded a French language version of the song, with lyrics by Don Diego, with the title "Dis-moi lequel" that was released in France in a vinyl single by Disques Vogue under license from Hispavox.

"Yo soy aquél" was included in the album Canta... Raphael that Manuel Alejandro produced for Raphael, in which he wrote eight of the twelve songs, arranged other three songs by other composers, and conducted the orchestra on the recording. Another song on the album written by Antonio Areta was arranged and conducted by Frank Ferrer. Seven of Alejandro's songs were featured in the film Cuando tú no estás. The album released in Spain by Hispavox in 1966, was released in different vinyl editions internationally.

== Charts ==
=== Weekly charts ===
Chart	Peak position	Interval in peak position
Mexico (List)	1	26 August – 22 September 1967
Spain (List)	1	21 March – 24 April 1966; 2 May – 5 June 1966
Venezuela	4	12 – 18 August 1967

== Legacy ==
=== Cover versions ===
The song was subsequently covered many times and released by different singers:

- Simone de Oliveira covered the song in Portuguese with the title "Tu és aquele" in her 1966 album Música No Coração.
- Cherry Navarro covered the song in his 1966 album with Chelique Sarabia and Aníbal Abreu El Mismo Cherry.
- Willy Alberti covered the song as a single in 1966.
- Imelda Miller covered the song with the title "Tú eres aquél" in her 1967 album Presentando a Imelda Miller.
- Louie Ramirez and his orchestra with Ray de la Paz covered the song in salsa version in their 1984 album ¡Con Caché!.
- Los Panchos covered the song in their 1991 album Hoy.
- Chayanne covered the song in his 1994 album Influencias.
- El chaval de la peca covered the song in his 1999 album In Person.
- In 2006, Telefe commissioned David Bolzoni to cover the song to use it as the main theme for their telenovela Montecristo. This version was also used in the later Mexican, Chilean, and Colombian remakes of the telenovela. Bolzoni released the song that same year in his first solo album David Bolzoni.
- Fernando Villalona covered the song in merengue version in 2008.
- Ernesto D'Alessio covered the song in his 2009 album Enamorado de tí.
- Gerónimo Rauch covered the song in his 2018 album Porque yo te amo.

=== Other performances ===
- Gracita Morales, accompanied by José Luis López Vázquez on guitar, makes a comic performance of the song as "Tú eres aquél" in the 1967 film Operación cabaretera.
- David Bustamante performed the song in the show Europasión, aired on La 1 of Televisión Española on 21 May 2008 to choose by popular vote the best song that Spain has sent to Eurovision.
- Daniel Diges performed the song in Televisión Española's sixtieth anniversary gala 60 años juntos aired simultaneously on La 1 and La 2 on 18 December 2016.
- In the show La mejor canción jamás cantada aired on La 1 of Televisión Española to choose by popular vote the best Spanish song ever sung, Gerónimo Rauch performed "Yo soy aquél" in the episode dedicated to the 1960s, aired on 22 February 2019, winning the episode competition as the best song of that decade. In the grand final episode, aired on 5 April 2019, in which the winner song of each episode dedicated to each of the previous seven decades competed, the song was performed by Melody placing fifth in the overall competition.

=== Impersonations ===
Raphael performances singing "Yo soy aquél" have been recreated several times:

- In the two-episode television biographical miniseries Raphael: una historia de superación personal aired on 29 September and 6 November 2010 on Antena 3, actor Félix Gómez, who plays young Raphael, performs "Yo soy aquél". The miniseries also portrays Raphael's experience at Eurovision.
- In the eleventh episode of the fourth season of Tu cara me suena aired on 27 November 2015 on Antena 3, actor Edu Soto impersonated Raphael singing "Yo soy aquél" replicating the performance at Eurovision and winning the episode competition.
- In the grand final episode of the second season of Yo soy aired on 22 December 2020 on Chilevisión, Cristóbal Osorio impersonated Raphael singing "Yo soy aquél" replicating –and singing in duo– the performance at Eurovision and winning the overall competition.
- In the fourth episode of the second season of Tu cara me suena aired on 17 April 2022 on Univision and Las Estrellas, Kika Edgar impersonated Raphael singing "Yo soy aquél" and placed fifth in the episode competition.
- In the second episode of the first season of Tu cara me suena aired on 17 March 2025 on Teledoce, Christian Font impersonated Raphael singing "Yo soy aquél" and placed last in the episode competition.
- In the eight-episode television biographical series Aquel released on 9 October 2026 in Spain and Latin-America by Netflix, actor Javier Morgade, who plays young Raphael, performs "Yo soy aquél" replicating the performance at Eurovision and portrays Raphael's experience at the contest.
