= Spain in the Eurovision Song Contest 1966 =

- Eurovision Song Contest 1966
- Participating broadcaster: Televisión Española (TVE)
- Country: Spain
- Selection process: Internal selection
- Announcement date: 14 January 1966

Competing entry
- Song: "Yo soy aquél"
- Artist: Raphael
- Songwriter: Manuel Alejandro

Placement
- Final result: 7th, 9 points

Participation chronology

Spain was represented at the Eurovision Song Contest 1966 with the song "Yo soy aquél", written by Manuel Alejandro, and performed by Raphael. The Spanish participating broadcaster, Televisión Española (TVE), internally selected its entry for the contest. The song, performed in position 11, placed seventh –tying with the song from Yugoslavia– out of eighteen competing entries with 9 points.

== Before Eurovision ==
To select its entry for the Eurovision Song Contest 1966, a committee was created in Televisión Española (TVE) composed by Enrique de la Hoz, José María Quero, Rafael Ferrer, and Fernando Díaz Giles. The committee addressed the Sociedad General de Autores de España (SGAE) requesting original songs from which they could select one, naming nine possible composers as an example, but leaving the SGAE freedom of choice. Since the SGAE did not consider appropriate to choose among its associates, the committee agreed to take into consideration all the works sent to them by SGAE's associated composers.

The committee accepted twenty songs from seven composers. From those, they chose eight after studying them on score; they then reduced the list to five after hearing them recorded on piano, and those five were recorded with arrangements and orchestra. From those five, they chose unanimously "Yo soy aquél" wrote by Manuel Alejandro. They selected Raphael as its performer since the song was intended for him.

The public presentation of the song, songwriter, and performer was done without prior notice on a special broadcast on TVE on 14 January 1966, for which they had to ask permission from the head of the military garrison where Raphael was doing his compulsory military service, so that he could travel to Prado del Rey for the announcement and performance. Following a protest from Carmelo Larrea, one of the songwriters in the selection, who claimed that Raphael had been previously selected and that he had imposed the song, the broadcaster had to issue a statement denying the accusations.

== At Eurovision ==
On 5 March 1966, the Eurovision Song Contest was held at Villa Louvigny in Luxembourg hosted by the Compagnie Luxembourgeoise de Télédiffusion (CLT), and broadcast live throughout the continent. Manuel Fraga himself, the Minister of Information and Tourism, on whom TVE depended at that time, had to obtain special permission so that Raphael could leave the garrison for a few days to travel to Luxembourg. He performed "Yo soy aquél" 11th in the evening, following Sweden and preceding the Switzerland. Rafael Ibarbia made the orchestral arrangement of the Spanish entry and conducted the event's orchestra in its performance. At the close of voting "Yo soy aquél" had received 9 points, placing 7th in a field of 18, in a tie with the song from Yugoslavia.

TVE broadcast the contest in Spain on its television service with commentary by Federico Gallo. Before the event, TVE aired a talk show hosted by Eduardo Sancho introducing the Spanish jury from Prado del Rey, which continued after the contest commenting on the results.

=== Voting ===
TVE assembled a jury panel with ten members. The following members comprised the Spanish jury:

- Antoñita Moreno – copla singer
- Ana María Olaria – opera singer
- Matías Escribano
- Carlos Sentís – journalist
- Adolfo Marsillach – actor
- Joaquín Araujo
- Jaime de Armiñán – screenwriter
- Fernando García de la Vega – television camera director
- Raúl Matas – journalist
- Mariano Méndez

Points awarded to Spain
Score	Country
5 points	Portugal
3 points	United Kingdom
1 point	Yugoslavia

Points awarded by Spain
Score	Country
5 points	Portugal
3 points	Norway
1 point	Austria
