= A Man Without Love =

1966 song by Kenneth McKellar

Single by Kenneth McKellar
- Released: 1966
- Composer: Cyril Ornadel
- Lyricist: Peter Callander

Eurovision Song Contest 1966 entry
- Country: United Kingdom
- Artist: Kenneth McKellar
- Language: English
- Composer: Cyril Ornadel
- Lyricist: Peter Callander
- Conductor: Harry Rabinowitz

Finals performance
- Final result: 9th
- Final points: 8

Entry chronology
- ◄ "I Belong" (1965)
- "Puppet on a String" (1967) ►

"A Man Without Love" is a song written by Cyril Ornadel and Peter Callander and performed by Kenneth McKellar. It represented the United Kingdom in the Eurovision Song Contest 1966.

The song is a ballad, with McKellar comparing a man without love and a man with love. He explains that a man without love is "only half a man, this nothing", and a man "with love is everything in life".

== At Eurovision ==
For the performance of the song in Luxembourg, McKellar wore the traditional Scottish kilt. It was performed eighteenth and last on the night, following Ireland's Dickie Rock with "Come Back to Stay". At the close of voting, it had received eight points (five from Ireland and three from Luxembourg), placing ninth in a field of 18 (the worst placing for the United Kingdom until 1978).

It was succeeded as British representative at the 1967 contest by Sandie Shaw with "Puppet on a String".

== Charts ==
"A Man Without Love" peaked at No. 30 on the UK Singles Chart in March 1966.

Preceded by "I Belong" by Kathy Kirby	United Kingdom in the Eurovision Song Contest; 1966	Succeeded by "Puppet on a String" by Sandie Shaw
