= Dio, come ti amo =

1966 song by both Domenico Modugno and Gigliola Cinquetti

Single by Domenico Modugno
- Language: Italian
- B-side: Io di più
- Released: 1966
- Label: Curci
- Songwriter: Domenico Modugno

Eurovision Song Contest 1966 entry
- Country: Italy
- Artist: Domenico Modugno
- Language: Italian
- Composer: Domenico Modugno
- Lyricist: Domenico Modugno
- Conductor: Angelo Giacomazzi

Finals performance
- Final result: 17th
- Final points: 0

Entry chronology
- ◄ "Se piangi, se ridi" (1965)
- "Non andare più lontano" (1967) ►

"Dio, come ti amo"

Single by Gigliola Cinquetti
- Language: Italian
- B-side: Vuoi
- Released: 1966
- Label: CGD
- Songwriter: Domenico Modugno

"Dio, come ti amo" (Italian for 'God, How I Love You') is a song recorded by both Italian singers Domenico Modugno and Gigliola Cinquetti, composed and written by Modugno himself. The song won the Sanremo Music Festival 1966 and represented Italy – performed by Modugno – in the Eurovision Song Contest 1966, held in Luxembourg.

== Background ==
=== Conception ===
The song was composed by Domenico Modugno. It is a ballad, in which the singer tells his/her lover how he feels about her/him. The singer expresses his/her amazement at the depth of his/her own feelings, with the title phrase being used frequently.

=== Sanremo ===
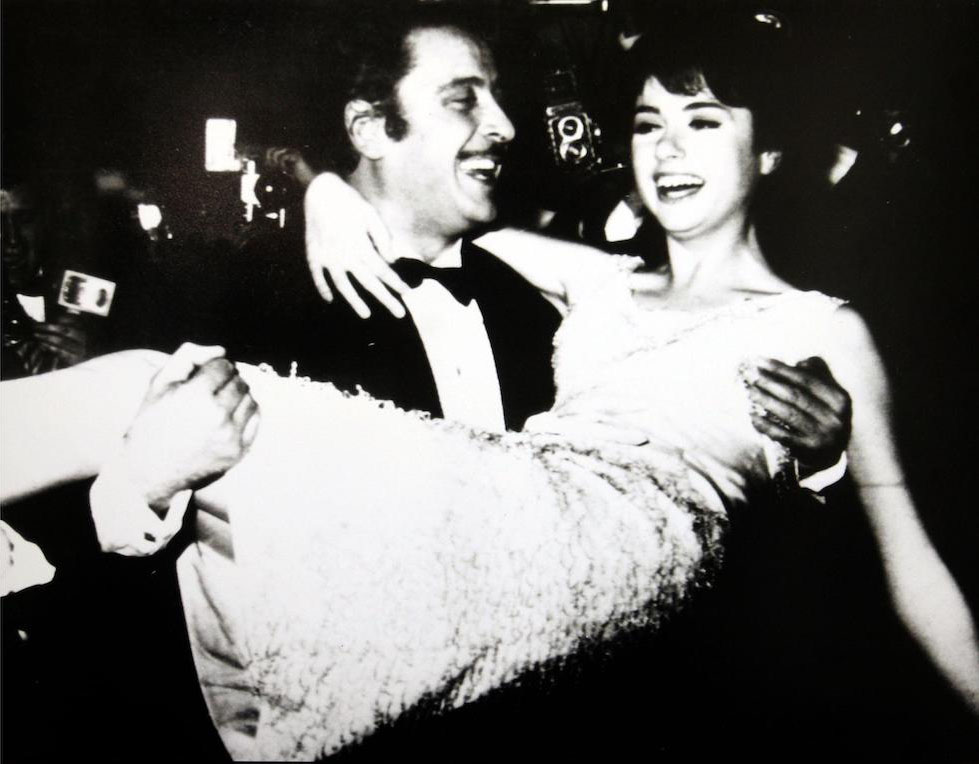
Modugno and Cinquetti celebrating their song's victory in Sanremo.

On 27–29 January 1966, "Dio, come ti amo" competed in the 16th edition of the Sanremo Music Festival performed by both Modugno and Gigliola Cinquetti, and winning the competition. As the festival was used by Radiotelevisione italiana (RAI) to select its song and performer for the 11th edition of the Eurovision Song Contest, the song became the Italian entry for the contest.

Modugno released then the song also in English (as "Oh, how much I love you"), German (as "Ich lieb' dich immer mehr"), and in two Spanish versions ("Dios mío, como te quiero" and "Dios, como te amo").

=== Eurovision ===
On 5 March 1966, the Eurovision Song Contest was held at Villa Louvigny in Luxembourg hosted by the Compagnie Luxembourgeoise de Télédiffusion (CLT), and broadcast live throughout the continent. Modugno performed "Dio, come ti amo" fourteenth on the evening, following Monaco's "Bien plus fort" by Téréza and preceding France's "Chez nous" by Dominique Walter.

The song had been rearranged since its performance at Sanremo. During rehearsals, mere hours before the live contest, Modugno performed the new arrangement with three of his own musicians as opposed to the orchestra, which went over the three minute time limit. This broke the European Broadcasting Union (EBU) rules stating that the arrangement should be communicated well in advance and should not be over three minutes. Following his rehearsal, Modugno was confronted by the show's producers about exceeding the time limit and was asked to use the original arrangement with the orchestra. Modugno was so dissatisfied with the orchestra that he threatened to withdraw from the contest. Both the producers and EBU scrutineer Clifford Brown felt it was too short notice to fly Cinquetti to Luxembourg to perform the song, so the EBU gave in and allowed Modugno to use his own ensemble instead of the orchestra. Despite news reports and the official programme listing Angelo Giacomazzi as the conductor, Giacomazzi actually played the piano for the entry.

At the close of voting, the song had received nul points (zero), for the first and also the only time in Italian Eurovision history, placing seventeenth (equal last) in a field of eighteen. It was succeeded as Italian representative at the 1967 contest by "Non andare più lontano" by Claudio Villa.

=== Aftermath ===
Cinquetti starred in a musicarello film titled Dio, come ti amo! released in 1966, accompanied by Mark Damon, Raimondo Vianello, and Nino Taranto.

== Charts ==
Chart (1966)	Peak position
Argentina (CAPIF) Gigliola Cinquetti Italian version	2
Brazil (IBOPE) Gigliola Cinquetti Italian version	6
Italy (Musica e dischi) Domenico Modugno Italian version	1
Peru (La Prensa) Gigliola Cinquetti Spanish version	1
Spain (AFYVE)	5

== Other versions ==
- Sergio Franchi recorded an English/Italian version titled "Oh How Much I Love You (Dio, come ti amo!)" in 1967 on his RCA Victor album From Sergio – With Love.
- Shirley Bassey recorded a version of the song titled "Dio, come ti amo (Oh God How Much I Love You)" for her 1991 album Keep the Music Playing.
- Spanish performer Vega recorded the song in 2017 accompanied by Elvis Costello. Both sang it in the original Italian.
