= Norway in the Eurovision Song Contest 1966 =

- Eurovision Song Contest 1966
- Participating broadcaster: Norsk rikskringkasting (NRK)
- Country: Norway
- Selection process: Melodi Grand Prix 1966
- Selection date: 5 February 1966

Competing entry
- Song: "Intet er nytt under solen"
- Artist: Åse Kleveland
- Songwriter: Arne Bendiksen

Placement
- Final result: 3rd, 15 points

Participation chronology

Norway was represented at the Eurovision Song Contest 1966 with the song "Intet er nytt under solen", written by Arne Bendiksen, and performed by Åse Kleveland. The Norwegian participating broadcaster, Norsk rikskringkasting (NRK), organised the national final Melodi Grand Prix 1966 in order to select its entry for the contest.

== Before Eurovision ==
=== Melodi Grand Prix 1966 ===
Norsk rikskringkasting (NRK) held the Melodi Grand Prix 1966 at Centralteatret in Oslo, hosted by Øivind Bergh. Five performers and songs took part in the final with each song performed twice by different singers, once with a small combo and once with a full orchestra. The winning song was chosen by voting from ten regional juries.

MGP - 5 February 1966
Letter	Combo		Orchestra		Song	Points	Place
Letter	R/O	Artist	R/O	Artist	Song	Points	Place
A	1	Wenche Myhre	8	Kirsti Sparboe	"Lørdagstripp"	6	4
B	7	Grynet Molvig	2	Anita Thallaug	"Ung og forelsket"	7	3
C	3	Kirsti Sparboe	6	Åse Kleveland	"Gi meg fri"	11	2
D	9	Åse Kleveland	4	Grynet Molvig	"Intet er nytt under solen"	22	1
E	5	Anita Thallaug	10	Wenche Myhre	"Vims"	4	5

== At Eurovision ==
On the evening of the final, Kleveland performed 6th in the running order, following Yugoslavia and preceding Finland. "Intet er nytt under solen" was an unusual and adventurous song for Eurovision at the time, with a sophisticated, atmospheric instrumental arrangement, and a 5/4 time signature. Kleveland was the first female performer in Eurovision to appear on stage with a guitar, and the first female performer to appear in trousers rather than a dress or skirt. Voting was by each national jury awarding 5-3-1 to their top 3 songs, and at the close "Intet er nytt under solen" had picked up 15 points (5 from Italy, 3s from Austria, Spain, and Sweden, and 1 from Germany), placing Norway third of the 18 entries. This was Norway's best Eurovision showing at the time, and would remain so until the victory of Bobbysocks! in 1985. Kleveland went on to present the 1986 contest in Bergen, the first to be hosted by Norway.

=== Voting ===
Points awarded to Norway
Score	Country
5 points	Italy
3 points	Austria; Spain; Sweden
1 point	Germany

Points awarded by Norway
Score	Country
5 points	Sweden
3 points	Finland
1 point	Denmark
