= Kenneth McKellar =

Kenneth McKellar may refer to:

- Kenneth McKellar (singer) (1927–2010), Scottish tenor
- Kenneth McKellar (politician) (1869–1957), United States senator and congressman from the state of Tennessee
