= Eurovision Song Contest 1966 =

International song competition

Date and venue
- Final: 5 March 1966
- Venue: Villa Louvigny; Luxembourg City, Luxembourg

Organisation
- Organiser: European Broadcasting Union (EBU)
- Scrutineer: Clifford Brown

Production
- Host broadcaster: Compagnie Luxembourgeoise de Télédiffusion (CLT)
- Directors: Jos Pauly; René Steichen
- Musical director: Jean Roderès
- Presenter: Josiane Shen

Participants
- Number of entries: 18
- Participation map: Participating countries

Vote
- Voting system: Each country awarded 5, 3 and 1 points (or combinations thereof) to their three favourite songs
- Winning song: Austria "Merci, Chérie"

The Eurovision Song Contest 1966, originally known as the Grand Prix Eurovision de la Chanson Européenne 1966 (English: Eurovision Song Contest Grand Prix 1966), was the 11th edition of the Eurovision Song Contest, held on 5 March 1966 at Villa Louvigny in Luxembourg City, Luxembourg, and presented by Josiane Shen. It was organised by the European Broadcasting Union (EBU) and host broadcaster Compagnie Luxembourgeoise de Télédiffusion (CLT), who staged the event after winning the 1965 contest for Luxembourg with the song "Poupée de cire, poupée de son" by France Gall.

Broadcasters from eighteen countries participated in the contest, the same countries that had competed the previous year.

The winner was Austria with the song "Merci, Chérie", performed and composed by Udo Jürgens, and written by Jürgens and Thomas Hörbiger. This was Udo Jürgens third consecutive entry in the contest, finally managing to score a victory for his native country. This was also the first winning song to be performed in German. Sweden, Norway, Belgium and Ireland rounded out the top five, with all achieving their best results up to that point.

== Location ==
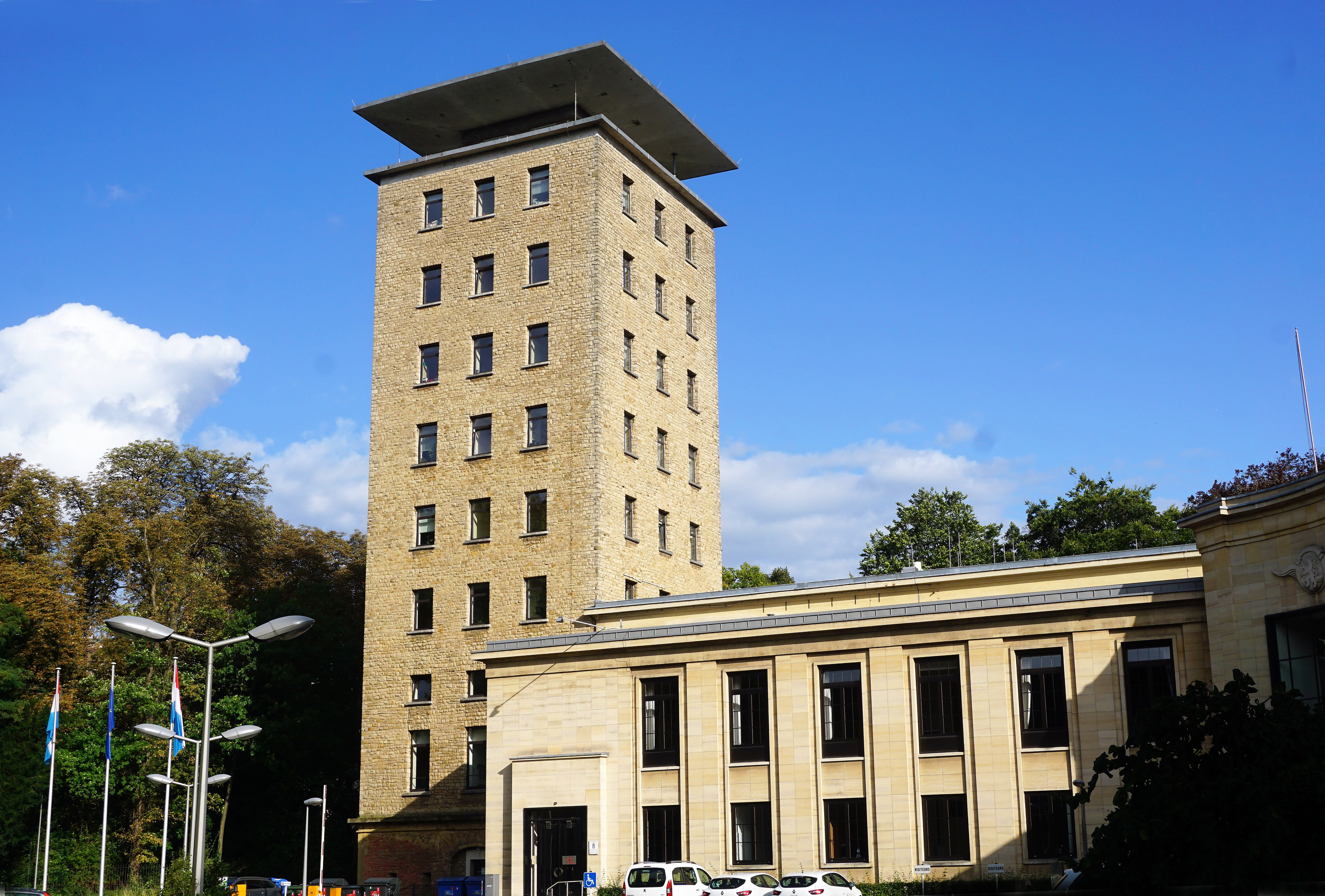
Villa Louvigny, Luxembourg – host venue of the 1966 contest

Compagnie Luxembourgeoise de Télédiffusion (CLT) staged the 1966 contest in Luxembourg City, after winning the 1965 contest for Luxembourg with the song "Poupée de cire, poupée de son" by France Gall. The venue selected was Villa Louvigny, which was also the venue for the 1962 edition. The building served as the headquarters of the broadcaster and housed its television studios. It is located in Municipal Park, in the Ville Haute district of the centre of the city.

== Participants ==
Eurovision Song Contest 1966 – Participation summaries by country
- Austria; Belgium; Denmark; Finland; France; Germany; Ireland; Italy; Luxembourg; Monaco; Netherlands; Norway; Portugal; Spain; Sweden; Switzerland; United Kingdom; Yugoslavia

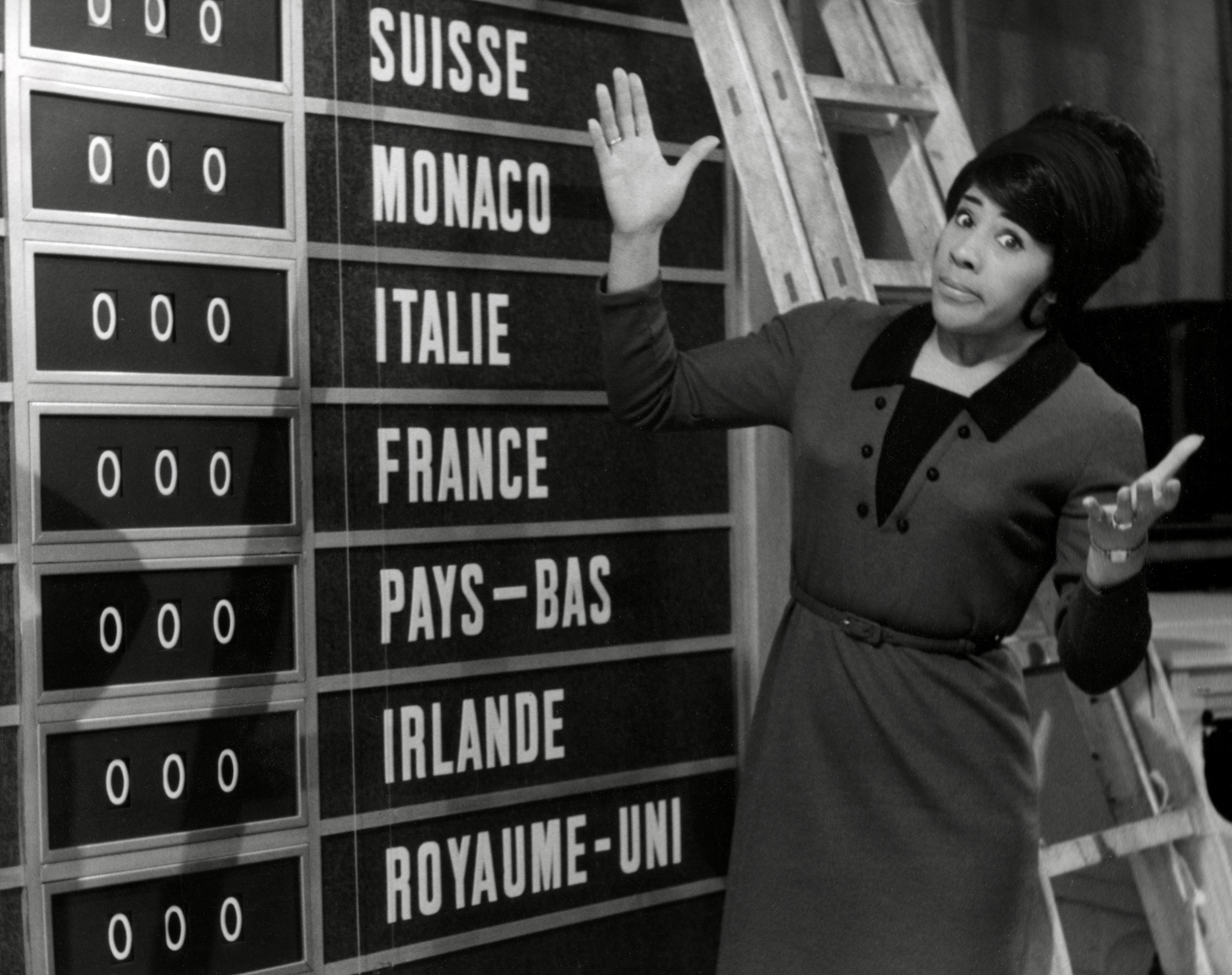
Dutch representative Milly Scott was the first black singer to compete in the contest

Broadcasters from eighteen countries participated in the 1966 contest, the same countries which had participated in the previous year's event.

The event featured two artists which had previously competed in the contest for their countries: Udo Jürgens made a third consecutive appearance in the contest, after previously representing Austria in 1964 and in 1965; and Domenico Modugno also participated in the contest a third time, after representing Italy in 1958 and in 1959. Also notable among the participants was Milly Scott, representing the Netherlands, who was the first black singer to compete in the Eurovision Song Contest.

Eurovision Song Contest 1966 participants
Country	Broadcaster	Artist	Song	Language	Songwriter(s)	Conductor
Austria	ORF	Udo Jürgens	"Merci, Chérie"	German	Thomas Hörbiger; Udo Jürgens	Hans Hammerschmid
Belgium	RTB	Tonia	"Un peu de poivre, un peu de sel"	French	Paul Quintens; Phil Van Cauwenbergh	Jean Roderès
Denmark	DR	Ulla Pia	"Stop – mens legen er go'"	Danish	Erik Kåre	Arne Lamberth
Finland	YLE	Ann-Christine	"Playboy"	Finnish	Ossi Runne	Ossi Runne
France	ORTF	Dominique Walter	"Chez nous"	French	Claude Carrère; Jacques Plante	Franck Pourcel
Germany	HR (Note: On behalf of the German public broadcasting consortium ARD)	Margot Eskens	"Die Zeiger der Uhr"	German	Hans Bradtke; Walter Dobschinski	Willy Berking
Ireland	RÉ	Dickie Rock	"Come Back to Stay"	English	Rowland Soper	Noel Kelehan
Italy	RAI	Domenico Modugno	"Dio, come ti amo"	Italian	Domenico Modugno	Angelo Giacomazzi
Luxembourg	CLT	Michèle Torr	"Ce soir je t'attendais"	French	Jacques Chaumelle; Bernard Kesslair	Jean Roderès
Monaco	TMC	Téréza	"Bien plus fort"	French	Gérard Bourgeois; Jean-Max Rivière	Alain Goraguer
Netherlands	NTS	Milly Scott	"Fernando en Philippo"	Dutch	Gerrit den Braber; Kees de Bruyn	Dolf van der Linden
Norway	NRK	Åse Kleveland	"Intet er nytt under solen"	Norwegian	Arne Bendiksen	Øivind Bergh
Portugal	RTP	Madalena Iglésias	"Ele e ela"	Portuguese	Carlos Canelhas	Jorge Costa Pinto
Spain	TVE	Raphael	"Yo soy aquél"	Spanish	Manuel Alejandro	Rafael Ibarbia
Sweden	SR	Lill Lindfors and Svante Thuresson	"Nygammal vals"	Swedish	Björn Lindroth; Bengt-Arne Wallin	Gert-Ove Andersson
Switzerland	SRG SSR	Madeleine Pascal	"Ne vois-tu pas ?"	French	Pierre Brenner; Roland Schweizer	Jean Roderès
United Kingdom	BBC	Kenneth McKellar	"A Man Without Love"	English	Peter Callander; Cyril Ornadel	Harry Rabinowitz
Yugoslavia	JRT	Berta Ambrož	"Brez besed"	Slovene	Elza Budau; Mojmir Sepe	Mojmir Sepe

== Production and format ==
The contest was organised and broadcast by CLT. The same production team which had worked on the 1962 contest returned to help stage this event, with Jos Pauly and René Steichen serving as producers and directors and Jean Roderès serving as musical director. Each participating broadcaster was allowed to appoint their own musical director to lead the orchestra during the performance of their entry, with the host musical director also conducting for those countries which did not nominate their own conductor. The contest was presented by Josiane Shen.

Following the confirmation of the eighteen competing countries, the draw to determine the running order of the contest was held on 13 January 1966.

New changes to the contest rules was introduced this year; The first allowed music experts to be present in the juries again, while the second rule change stated, that a country could only perform in any of its national languages. This came about after the 1965 Swedish entry was sung in English.

This was one of the first contests in which an entry was not accompanied by an orchestra. The Italian entry "Dio, come ti amo" performed by Domenico Modugno had been rearranged since its performance at the Sanremo Music Festival 1966 and officially broke the EBU rule that stated the arrangement should be finalised well in advance. During the Saturday afternoon rehearsal Modugno performed the new arrangement with three of his own musicians as opposed to the orchestra, which went over the three-minute time limit. Following his rehearsal Modugno was confronted by the show's producers about exceeding the time limit and was asked to use the original arrangement with the orchestra. Modugno was so dissatisfied with the orchestra that he threatened to withdraw from the contest. Both the producers and EBU scrutineer Clifford Brown felt it was too short notice to fly Gigliola Cinquetti to Luxembourg to represent Italy, so the EBU gave in and allowed Modugno to use his own ensemble instead of the orchestra. Despite websites and the official programme listing Angelo Giacomazzi as the conductor, Giacomazzi actually played the piano for the entry.

== Contest overview ==
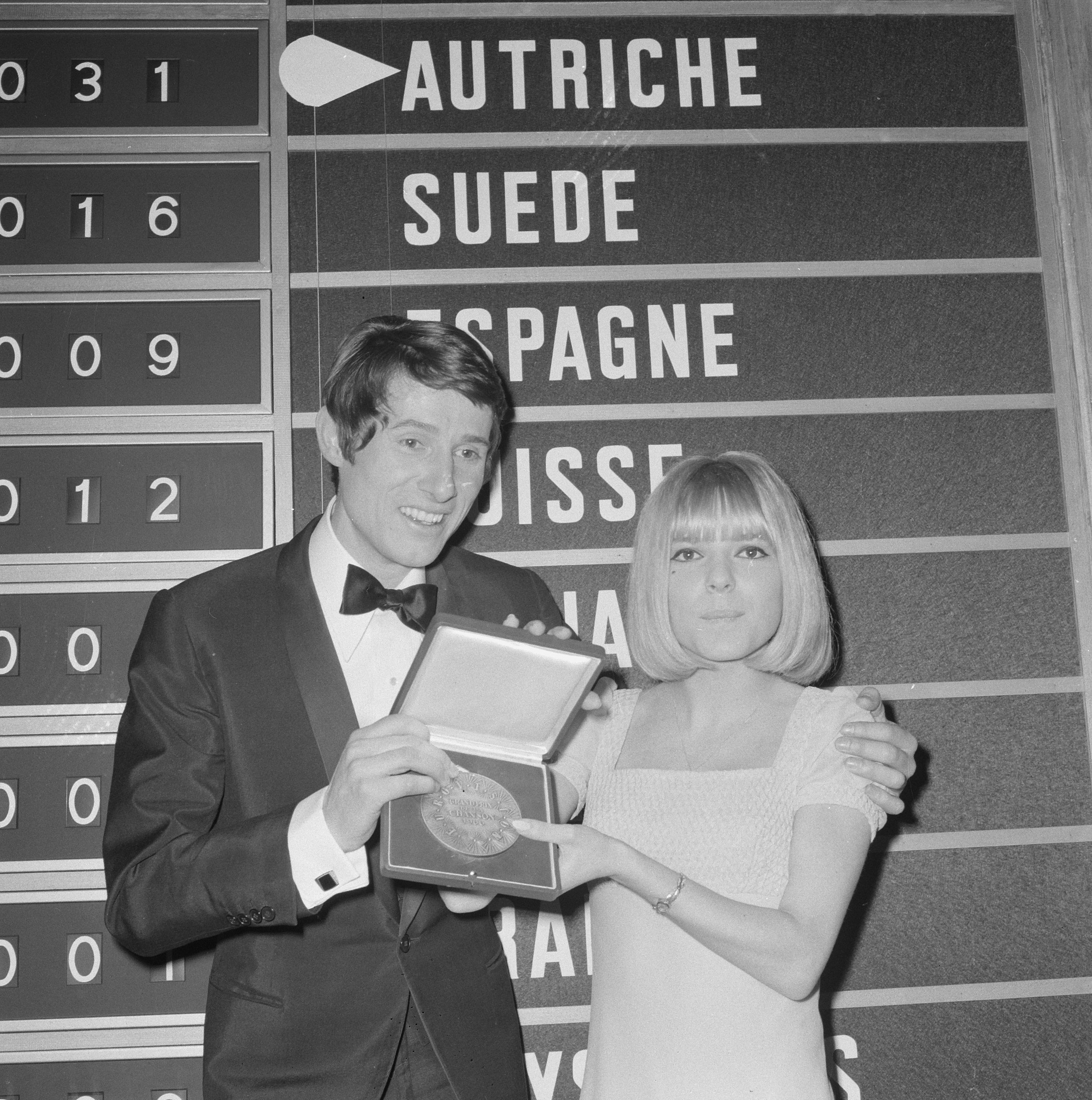
Udo Jürgens, 1966 winner, with his winner's medallion, presented by the previous year's winner France Gall

The contest was held at 5 March 1966 at 22:00 (CET) and lasted 1 hour and 27 minutes. The interval act was a performance by the French Dixieland jazz group Les Haricots rouges. The prize for the winning artist and songwriters, a medallion engraved with the Eurovision logo designed by Hans Mettel, was presented by the previous year's winning artist France Gall.

The contest is noted for its historic results for several countries. Austria who came first, Sweden who came second, Norway who came third and Belgium who came fourth all achieved their best results up until then, some of which would stand for several decades. In contrast, traditional Eurovision heavyweights such as France, United Kingdom, and Italy all achieved their worst result by far up till that point, with the general public in the aforementioned countries meeting these results with a degree of consternation.

Results of the Eurovision Song Contest 1966
R/O	Country	Artist	Song	Points	Place
1	Germany	Margot Eskens	"Die Zeiger der Uhr"	7	10
2	Denmark	Ulla Pia	"Stop – mens legen er go'"	4	14
3	Belgium	Tonia	"Un peu de poivre, un peu de sel"	14	4
4	Luxembourg	Michèle Torr	"Ce soir je t'attendais"	7	10
5	Yugoslavia	Berta Ambrož	"Brez besed"	9	7
6	Norway	Åse Kleveland	"Intet er nytt under solen"	15	3
7	Finland	Ann-Christine	"Playboy"	7	10
8	Portugal	Madalena Iglésias	"Ele e ela"	6	13
9	Austria	Udo Jürgens	"Merci, Chérie"	31	1
10	Sweden	Lill Lindfors and Svante Thuresson	"Nygammal vals"	16	2
11	Spain	Raphael	"Yo soy aquél"	9	7
12	Switzerland	Madeleine Pascal	"Ne vois-tu pas ?"	12	6
13	Monaco	Téréza	"Bien plus fort"	0	17
14	Italy	Domenico Modugno	"Dio, come ti amo"	0	17
15	France	Dominique Walter	"Chez nous"	1	16
16	Netherlands	Milly Scott	"Fernando en Philippo"	2	15
17	Ireland	Dickie Rock	"Come Back to Stay"	14	4
18	United Kingdom	Kenneth McKellar	"A Man Without Love"	8	9

=== Spokespersons ===
Each participating broadcaster appointed a spokesperson, connected to the contest venue via telephone lines and responsible for announcing, in English or French, the votes for their respective country. Known spokespersons at the 1966 contest are listed below.

- Finland – Poppe Berg
- Ireland – Frank Hall
- Luxembourg – Camillo Felgen (Note: Confirmed by host Josiane Shen during the broadcast.)
- Netherlands – Herman Brouwer
- Norway – Erik Diesen
- Sweden – Edvard Matz
- United Kingdom – Michael Aspel

== Detailed voting results ==
Detailed voting results
		Total score	Germany	Denmark	Belgium	Luxembourg	Yugoslavia	Norway	Finland	Portugal	Austria	Sweden	Spain	Switzerland	Monaco	Italy	France	Netherlands	Ireland	United Kingdom
Contestants	Germany	7			1									5		1				
Contestants	Denmark	4						1	3											
Contestants	Belgium	14	5							3		1						5		
Contestants	Luxembourg	7									1	5					1			
Contestants	Yugoslavia	9	3						1											5
Contestants	Norway	15	1								3	3	3			5				
Contestants	Finland	7		3				3										1		
Contestants	Portugal	6		1									5							
Contestants	Austria	31			5	5	5			1			1	3	5	3	3			
Contestants	Sweden	16		5				5	5					1						
Contestants	Spain	9					1			5										3
Contestants	Switzerland	12				1					5				3				3	
Contestants	Monaco	0																		
Contestants	Italy	0																		
Contestants	France	1													1					
Contestants	Netherlands	2																	1	1
Contestants	Ireland	14			3		3										5	3		
Contestants	United Kingdom	8				3													5	

=== 5 points ===
Below is a summary of all 5 points in the final:

N.	Contestant	Nation(s) giving 5 points
4	Austria	Belgium, Luxembourg, Monaco, Yugoslavia
3	Sweden	Denmark, Finland, Norway
2	Belgium	Germany, Netherlands
1	Germany	Switzerland
1	Ireland	France
1	Luxembourg	Sweden
1	Norway	Italy
1	Portugal	Spain
1	Spain	Portugal
1	Switzerland	Austria
1	United Kingdom	Ireland
1	Yugoslavia	United Kingdom

== Broadcasts ==
Each participating broadcaster was required to relay the contest via its networks. Non-participating EBU member broadcasters were also able to relay the contest as "passive participants". Broadcasters were able to send commentators to provide coverage of the contest in their own native language and to relay information about the artists and songs to their television viewers.

The contest was reportedly broadcast in 25 countries, including in the participating countries and Morocco; and in Czechoslovakia, East Germany, Hungary, Poland, Romania, and the Soviet Union via Intervision; with an estimated global audience of 500 million viewers. Known details on the broadcasts in each country, including the specific broadcasting stations and commentators are shown in the tables below.

Broadcasters and commentators in participating countries
Country	Broadcaster	Channel(s)	Commentator(s)	Ref(s)
Austria	ORF	ORF	Hans-Joachim Rauschenbach	
Belgium	RTB	RTB, Premier Programme		
Belgium	BRT	BRT		
Denmark	DR	DR TV	Skat Nørrevig	
Finland	YLE	TV-ohjelma 1, Yleisohjelma	Aarno Walli	
Finland	YLE	Ruotsinkielinen ula-ohjelma		
France	ORTF	Première Chaîne	François Deguelt	
France	ORTF	France Inter		
Germany	ARD	Deutsches Fernsehen	Hans-Joachim Rauschenbach	
Ireland	RÉ	Telefís Éireann	Brendan O'Reilly	
Ireland	RÉ	Radió Éireann	Kevin Roche	
Italy	RAI	Secondo Programma TV	Renato Tagliani	
Luxembourg	CLT	Télé-Luxembourg, Radio Luxembourg		
Netherlands	NTS	Nederland 1	Teddy Scholten	
Netherlands	KRO	Hilversum 1		
Norway	NRK	NRK Fjernsynet, NRK	Sverre Christophersen	
Portugal	RTP	RTP		
Spain	TVE	TVE	Federico Gallo	
Spain	RNE	Radio Peninsular de Barcelona		
Sweden	SR	Sveriges TV, SR P1	Sven Lindahl	
Switzerland	SRG SSR	TV DRS	Hans-Joachim Rauschenbach	
Switzerland	SRG SSR	TSR, Radio Sottens		
Switzerland	SRG SSR	TSI		
United Kingdom	BBC	BBC1	David Jacobs	
United Kingdom	BFBS	BFBS Radio	Ian Fenner	
Yugoslavia	JRT	Televizija Beograd		
Yugoslavia	JRT	Televizija Ljubljana		
Yugoslavia	JRT	Televizija Zagreb		

Broadcasters and commentators in non-participating countries
Country	Broadcaster	Channel(s)	Commentator(s)	Ref(s)
Czechoslovakia	ČST	ČST	Vladimír Dvořák	
Hungary	MTV	MTV		
Poland	TP	TV Polska		
Romania	TVR	TVR		

== Notes and references ==
=== Bibliography ===
- Murtomäki, Asko (2007). Finland 12 points! Suomen Euroviisut (in Finnish). Helsinki, Finland: Teos. ISBN 951-851-106-3.
- O'Connor, John Kennedy (2010). The Eurovision Song Contest: The Official History (2nd ed.). London: Carlton Books. ISBN 978-1-84732-521-1.
- Richard, Jean-Marc; Clapasson, Mary; Tanner, Nicolas (2017). La Saga Eurovision [The Eurovision Saga] (in French). Lausanne, Switzerland: Éditions Favre. ISBN 978-2828915490.
- Roxburgh, Gordon (2012). Songs for Europe: The United Kingdom at the Eurovision Song Contest. Vol. One: The 1950s and 1960s. Prestatyn, United Kingdom: Telos Publishing. ISBN 978-1-84583-065-6.
- Roxburgh, Gordon (2014). "Errata". Songs for Europe: The United Kingdom at the Eurovision Song Contest. Vol. Two: The 1970s. Prestatyn, United Kingdom: Telos Publishing. pp. 368–372. ISBN 978-1-84583-093-9.
- Thorsson, Leif; Verhage, Martin (2006). Melodifestivalen genom tiderna : de svenska uttagningarna och internationella finalerna [Melodifestivalen through the ages: the Swedish selections and international finals] (in Swedish). Stockholm, Sweden: Premium Publishing. ISBN 91-89136-29-2.
