= Josiane Shen =

Luxembourgish television presenter

- Occupation: Television presenter
- Known for: Presenting the Eurovision Song Contest in 1966

Josiane Shen, also known as Josiane André, is a Luxembourgish former television presenter. She is best known for hosting the Eurovision Song Contest in 1966.

== Career ==
Having earned a degree in journalism, Shen spent her entire career as a television presenter with Télé-Luxembourg.

She is best known for presenting the Eurovision Song Contest in Luxembourg in 1966, which she presented entirely in French with the exception of the voting procedure. Shen is best remembered for accidentally greeting the United Kingdom during the voting procedure with "Good night, London", before correcting herself to "Good evening, London", to which the British spokesperson, Michael Aspel, replied "Good morning, Luxembourg".

She also co-hosted two editions of the short-lived Grand Prix RTL International in 1970 and 1971.

== Filmography ==
=== Television ===
Year	Title	Role
1966	Eurovision Song Contest 1966	Presenter
1970	Grand Prix RTL International	Presenter (as Josiane)
1971	Grand Prix RTL International	Presenter (as Josiane)

== See also ==
- List of Eurovision Song Contest presenters

Preceded by (Italy) Renata Mauro	Eurovision Song Contest presenter 1966	Succeeded by (Austria) Erica Vaal
