= Netherlands in the Eurovision Song Contest 1966 =

- Eurovision Song Contest 1966
- Participating broadcaster: Nederlandse Televisie Stichting (NTS)
- Country: Netherlands
- Selection process: Nationaal Songfestival 1966
- Selection date: 5 February 1966

Competing entry
- Song: "Fernando en Filippo"
- Artist: Milly Scott
- Songwriters: Kees de Bruyn; Gerrit den Braber

Placement
- Final result: 15th, 2 points

Participation chronology

The Netherlands was represented at the Eurovision Song Contest 1966 with the song "Fernando en Filippo", composed by Kees de Bruyn, with lyrics by Gerrit den Braber, and performed by Milly Scott. The Dutch participating Broadcaster, Nederlandse Televisie Stichting (NTS), selected its entry through a national final. Scott became the first black performer to appear on stage in Eurovision.

Five acts participated in the Dutch preselection, which consisted of five qualifying rounds, followed by the final on 5 February. All the shows were held at the Tivoli in Utrecht, hosted by the 1959 Eurovision winner Teddy Scholten.

== Before Eurovision ==
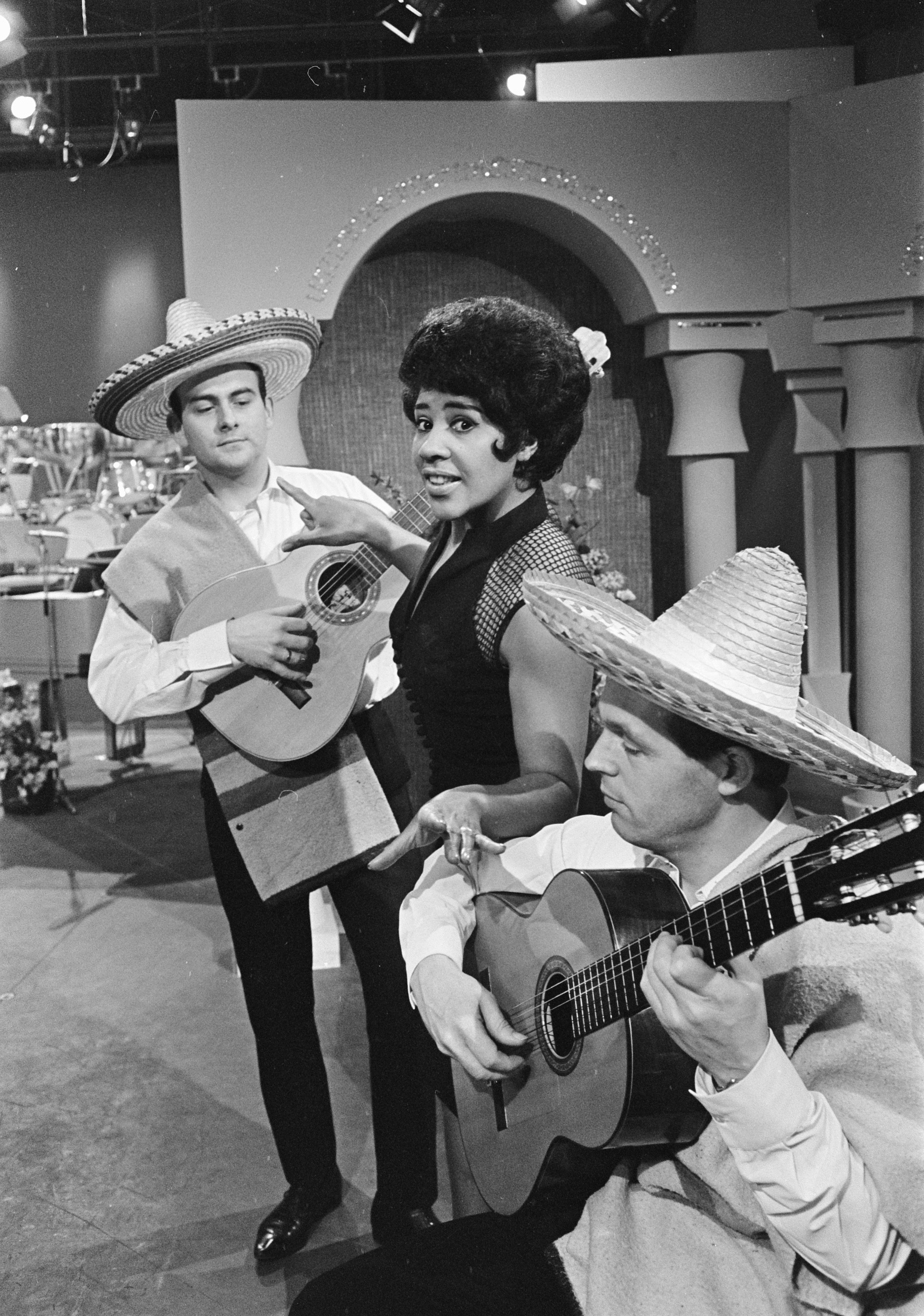
Milly Scott (in center) was selected to represent the Netherlands in 1966

=== Nationaal Songfestival 1966 ===
==== Heats ====
Five qualifying heats took place on consecutive evenings between 31 January and 4 February. Each involved one of the selected acts performing three songs, with the jury winner from each act going forward to the final. A different jury of 15 was used each evening. The format was the same used in the 1965 national final, and would be used again 30 years later in the 1996 national final.

Heat 1 – Helen Shepherd – 31 January 1966
R/O	Song	Place
1	"Over de horizon"	2
2	"Wereld"	1
3	"Ver hier vandaan"	3

Heat 2 – Piet Sybrandi – 1 February 1966
R/O	Song	Place
1	"Ergens in de west"	3
2	"In een battledress"	2
3	"Ik heb je lief"	1

Heat 3 – The Luckberries – 2 February 1966
R/O	Song	Place
1	"Dromen zijn bedrog"	1
2	"Mijn hart klopt alleen maar voor jou"	2
3	"Land der liefde"	3

Heat 4 – Bob Bouber – 3 February 1966
R/O	Song	Place
1	"Nog wel bedankt"	1
2	"Jouw eerste concert"	2
3	"Jij bent een raadsel"	3

Heat 5 – Milly Scott – 4 February 1966
R/O	Song	Place
1	"Fernando en Filippo"	1
2	"De onvoltooide symphonie"	2
3	"Graag of niet"	3

==== Final ====
The final was held on 5 February at 22:00 CET. It was broadcast on Nederland 1 and on radio station Hilversum 2. The winning song was chosen by the same five juries who had each individually chosen one of the songs for the final. Each jury member gave 1 point to their favourite song, and "Fernando en Filippo" was the choice of 52 of the 75 members.

Final – 5 February 1966
R/O	Artist	Song	Points	Place
1	Helen Shepherd	"Wereld"	3	3
2	Piet Sybrandi	"Ik heb je lief"	2	5
3	The Luckberries	"Dromen zijn bedrog"	15	2
4	Bob Bouber	"Nog wel bedankt"	3	3
5	Milly Scott	"Fernando en Filippo"	52	1

== At Eurovision ==
On the night of the final Scott performed 16th in the running order, following France and preceding Ireland. Voting was by each national jury awarding 5-3-1 to its top three songs, and at the close of the voting "Fernando en Filippo" had received 2 points, placing the Netherlands 15th of the 18 entries. During most of the voting procedure "Fernando en Filippo" had appeared to be heading for nul-points, until the last two countries to vote (Ireland and the United Kingdom) each awarded 1 point to the song. The Dutch jury awarded its 5 points to Belgium.

The Dutch conductor at the contest was Dolf van der Linden.

Scott earned a place in Eurovision history as the first black performer to appear on stage, and would later state that she believed her poor result at Eurovision was attributable, at least in part, to racism.

=== Voting ===
Points awarded to the Netherlands
Score	Country
5 points	
3 points	
1 point	Ireland; United Kingdom

Points awarded by the Netherlands
Score	Country
5 points	Belgium
3 points	Ireland
1 point	Finland
