= Milly Scott =

Dutch singer and actress (born 1933)

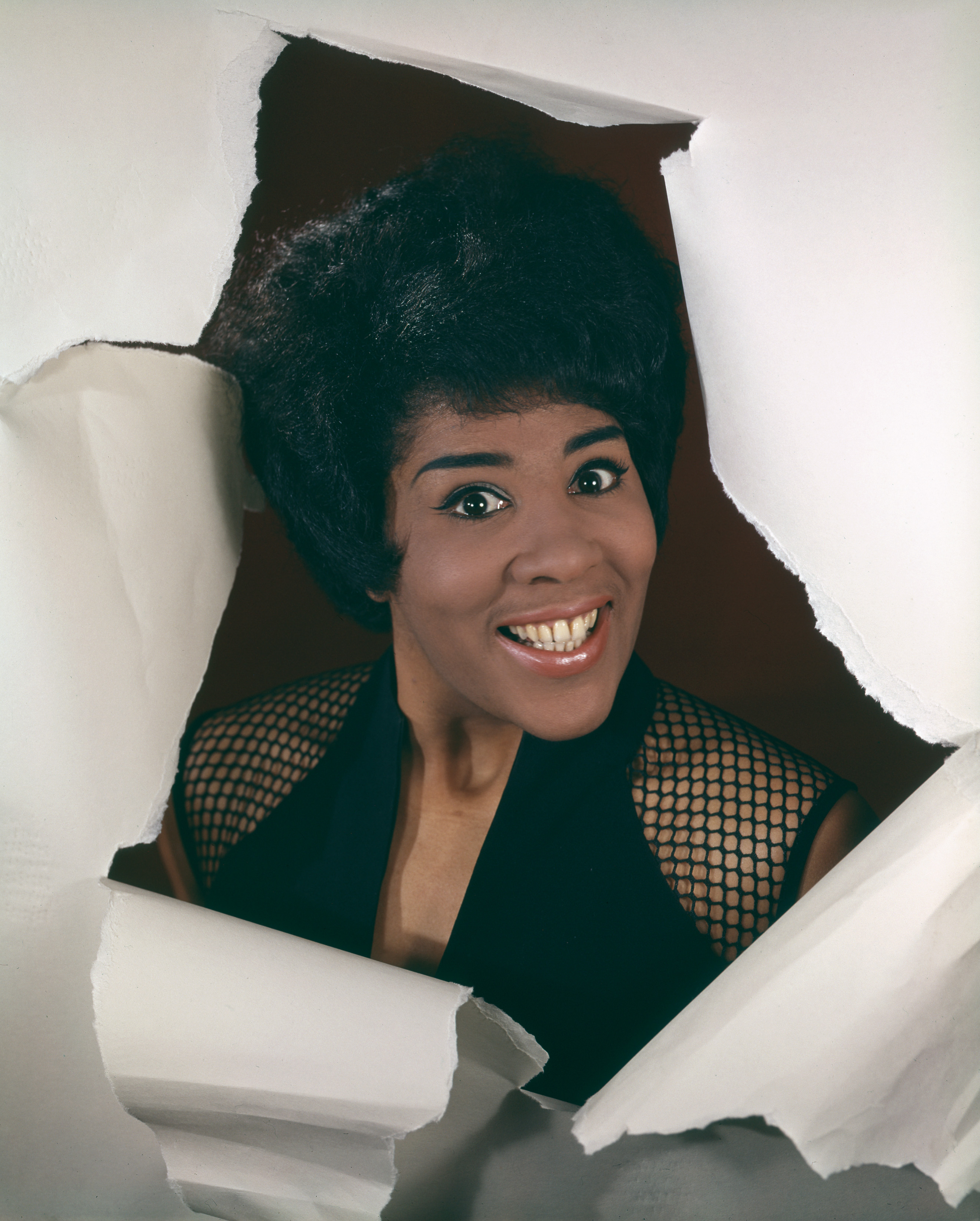
- Scott in the 1960s

Background information
- Born: Marion Henriëtte Louise Molly; 29 December 1933 (age 92); Den Helder, Netherlands
- Occupations: Singer; actress
- Website: www.millyscott.nl

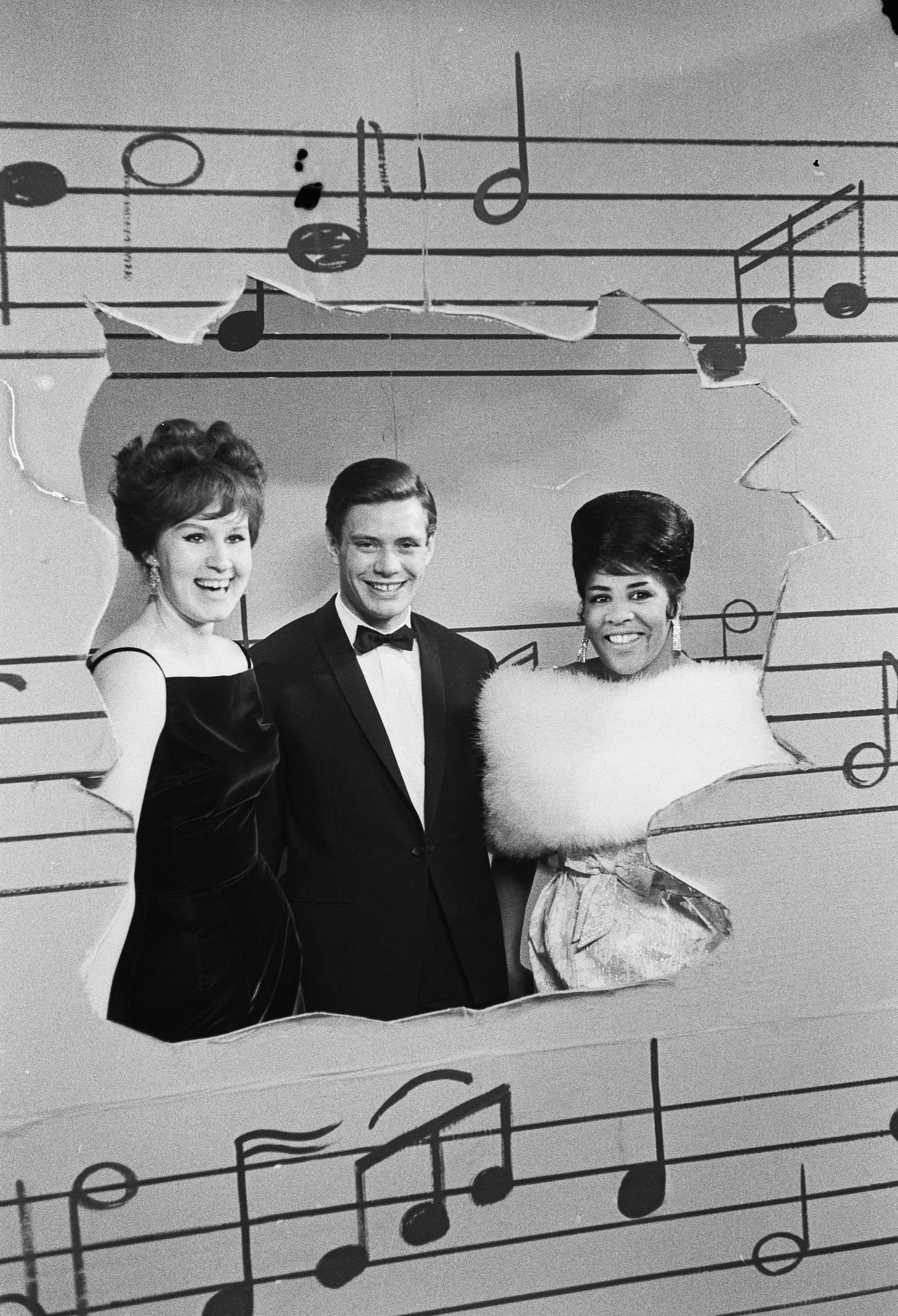
Scott (right) with Jennie Veeninga and Rob de Nijs during a television broadcast in 1963

Marion Henriëtte Louise Molly (born 29 December 1933), known professionally as Milly Scott, is a Dutch singer and actress of Surinamese origin, best known for her participation in the Eurovision Song Contest 1966. She is recognised as the first Black singer to take part in the Eurovision Song Contest.

== Early life ==
Scott was born in Den Helder, the main base of the Royal Netherlands Navy, where her father was stationed as a marine. Both her parents were immigrants from the colony of Surinam: her father, Harry Molly (1941–1943), was born in Commewijne as the illegitimate child of a washerwoman, while her mother, Lien Bruininger (1903–1986), was born in Paramaribo. The couple had five children, of which Scott is the eldest. She was one of only few Black children living in Den Helder at the time, and regularly faced xenophobia while growing up.

During the German invasion of the Netherlands in 1940, the ship HNLMS Johan Maurits van Nassau was bombed near Callantsoog, severely wounding Scott's father. Upon his recovery, the family moved to Amsterdam. In 1942, Scott's father was summoned and taken to Germany as a prisoner of war. He died of abdominal tuberculosis in Ludwigsburg the following year.

Scott's mother was supported in the upbringing of her children by a befriended couple, with whom Scott lived in Westerblokker for some time. Having learned to play the piano during the war, she started giving performances to financially support her mother after her father's death. At the age of 14, she began singing in amateur bands and was eventually given a scholarship to study at the conservatory in Amsterdam. However, she dropped out due to intense racism and bullying she experienced during her studies.

== Career ==
=== Early career ===
In 1953, at the age of 19, Scott was asked by Dutch comedian Toon Hermans to perform in one of his shows. According to Hermans, the name Milly suited her better than her birth name Marion. Following her mother's advice not to use her real surname, she then came up with the stage name Milly Scott. After performing in front of a big audience for the first time, she quickly built up a career as a jazz singer, with Lou van Rees as her impresario.

Working as a singer, she lived in Hamburg, West Germany from 1954, and later moved to Sweden where she stayed for five years. In Gothenburg and Stockholm, she shared the stage with world-famous artists, such as Judy Garland and Quincy Jones. Furthermore, she maintained a close friendship with Swedish-Dutch singer Cornelis Vreeswijk, whom she regularly visited at his home in Lidingö.

=== Return to the Netherlands and Eurovision Song Contest ===
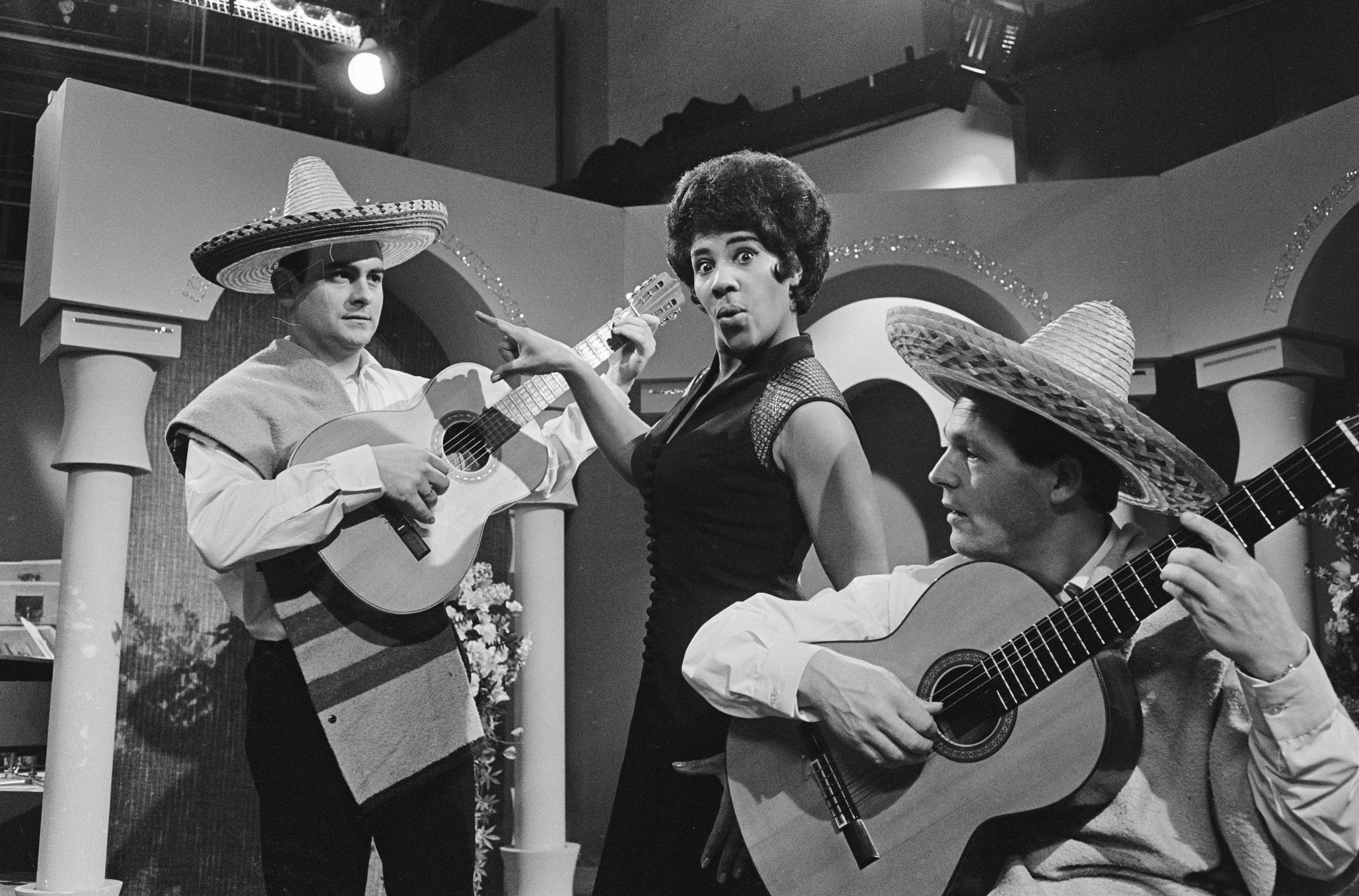
Scott performing "Fernando en Filippo" at the Nationaal Songfestival in 1966

Scott was rediscovered in the Netherlands following her participation in the Knokke Song Festival of 1962, alongside Anneke Grönloh, Max Woiski Jr., Mieke Telkamp, José Marcello and Joke Copier. She subsequently made frequent appearances in Dutch television shows, including Johnny & Rijk and Zo is het toevallig ook nog 's een keer, and was later given her own programme by VARA, titled Scott in de roos (after the phrase schot in de roos, meaning 'bullseye').

In 1966, Scott was asked to participate in the Nationaal Songfestival, the Dutch national selection for the Eurovision Song Contest. She went on to win the national final with the song "Fernando en Filippo", written by Gerrit den Braber and composed by Kees de Bruyn. This gave her the right to represent the Netherlands in the eleventh edition of the Eurovision Song Contest, held in Luxembourg City. Her entry received a total of two points from the international juries, placing fifteenth out of eighteen songs.

Although "Fernando en Filippo" was a novelty song (and was also performed as such) at a time when ballads dominated in the competition, Scott would later claim that her disappointing result was attributable, at least in part, to racism on the part of the voting jurors.

=== Career after Eurovision ===
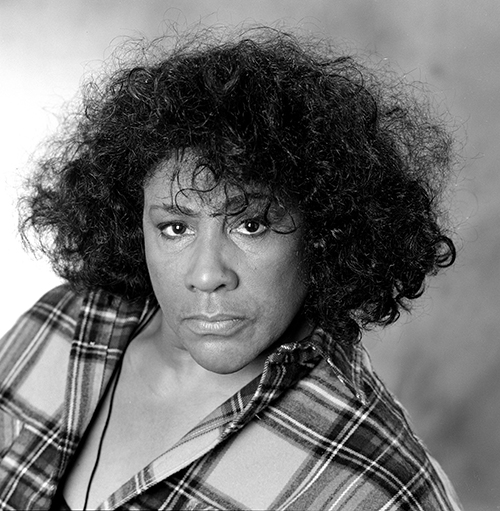
Scott as Baby Miller in 1994

Although Scott never produced any hit records, she managed to maintain a successful career as a jazz singer, performing in various countries across Europe. She also branched out into acting and featured in a number of theatre and television productions, including the Snip en Snap-revue (1970) and West Side Story (1974). Her best-known role was in the RTL 4 drama series Vrouwenvleugel (1993–1995) in which she played Baby Miller, a prisoner trying to come to terms with her racial identity.

== Personal life ==
Scott married and divorced three times, repeatedly experiencing domestic violence in her marriages. She has lived in Hoorn since 2002.

== Discography ==
=== Albums ===
Title	Details
Spotlight on Milly Scott	Released: 1966; Label: CNR; Format: LP
Trouble in Mind	Released: 2025; Label: Nederlands Jazz Archief; Format: LP, CD

=== Extended plays ===
Title	Details
Fernando en Filippo	Released: 1966; Label: CNR; Format: EP

=== Singles ===
==== As solo artist ====
Title	Year	B-side
"Rock-A-Beatin' Boogie" (with Rocky Roll and his Rock 'n' Rollers)	1957	"Short'nin' Bread Rock" (with Rocky Roll and his Rock 'n' Rollers)
"Melodie d'amour"	1958	"Africa"
"Up a Lazy River" (with the Beale Street Jazzband)	1963	"Crawdad Song" (with the Beale Street Jazzband)
"Je hebt m'n leven stukgemaakt"	1963	"Ik kus jouw ring"
"Kom huil dan"	1964	"Ik moet verder"
"Zonder jou ben ik niets"	1964	"Nee..."
"Hello Dolly"	1964	"Hush-A-By Ma Baby"
"Als een kind"	1965	"Zeg 's eerlijk"
"Fernando en Filippo (Tong-tiki-tong)"	1966	"Graag of niet"
"Fernando en Filippo"	1966	"Onvoltooide symfonie"
"Fernando y Felipe"	1966	"Ya no me quieres"
"Fernando and Filippo"	1966	"Don't Make a Fool of Me"
"Liefde smeult, liefde groeit, liefde bloeit, liefde stoeit"	1966	"B.B. met R."
"Guantanamera"	1966	"La Bamba"
"Who Cares"	1967	"I'm Laughing Up the Sleeve"
"Get High on Jesus"	1971	"Sunshine in My Rainy Day Mind"
"Spanish Harlem"	1972	"Zeg hem dat de sneeuw valt"
"Pata Pata"	1979	"I Was Just Like a Child"

==== As part of Milly and the Sisters Scott ====
Title	Year	B-side
"Come Over to My Place"	1965	"Silver Dollar"
"Baby, Did I Do You Right"	1966	"St. Louis Blues"

== Acting credits ==
=== Film ===
- De vuurproef, 1968 – Tituba
- The Fox and the Hound, 1981 – Big Mama (Dutch voice)

=== Television ===
- Die Affäre Lerouge, 1976 – Juliette Chaffour's Maid
- Vrouwenvleugel, 1995 (season 3; 22 episodes) – Baby Miller
- Goede tijden, slechte tijden, 2005 (season 15; 3 episodes) – Dorothea

=== Theatre ===
Title	Year	Role	Location	Ref.
Sweet Charity	1968	Helene	Netherlands	
Snip en Snap-revue	1970	Vedette	Netherlands	
West Side Story	1974	Anita	West Germany, including Gelsenkrichen and Kaiserlautern	
Gypsy	1976	Extase	Netherlands	
Rise and Fall of the City of Mahagonny	1978	Jenny Smith	Staatstheater Braunschweig	
Het dispuut	1982	Carise	Koninklijke Schouwburg, The Hague	
Nunsense	1987	Sister Mary Clementine	Netherlands	

Awards and achievements
Preceded by Conny Vandenbos with "'t Is genoeg"	Netherlands in the Eurovision Song Contest; 1966	Succeeded by Thérèse Steinmetz with "Ring-dinge-ding"
