= Song of the Clyde =

Song by R.Y. Bell and Ian Gourley
- Composers: R.Y. Bell; Ian Gourley

The Song of the Clyde is a song by R.Y. Bell and Ian Gourley.

== Background and Composition ==
Popularised by Kenneth McKellar (although covered by various Scottish singers) it is an affectionate tribute to the River Clyde in Scotland, name-checking the majority of towns and villages on its banks. Although its opening verse includes the line From Glasgow to Greenock with towns on each side, the song includes references to Lanark so fair on the river's upper reaches and Arran on the Firth of Clyde's southernmost outflow. The penultimate verse is a tongue twister meant to be sung in Glasgow vernacular.

== In popular culture ==
The song (McKellar's version) was used on the opening credits of the 1963 film Billy Liar and at the opening of Radio Clyde in 1973.

In a British House of Commons debate in 1994, Labour Member of Parliament Jimmy Hood (Clydesdale) recalled the song in a debate about coal mining, however refrained from acceding to members' requests that he sing it.

It was once parodied by Stanley Baxter, who played "Kenneth McColour" singing "The Pong of the Clyde".

Scottish Professional Football League side Clyde F.C. play Song of the Clyde before the team runs out onto the pitch, though this version has different lyrics. The lyrics were written by local singer Fraser Bruce.

It was partially covered by Belle and Sebastian as the opener to their 2020 live album What to Look for in Summer. This version was recorded in their studio in Glasgow, rather than played live on tour.
