= Portugal in the Eurovision Song Contest 1966 =

- Eurovision Song Contest 1966
- Participating broadcaster: Radiotelevisão Portuguesa (RTP)
- Country: Portugal
- Selection process: Grande Prémio TV da Canção Portuguesa 1966
- Selection date: 15 January 1966

Competing entry
- Song: "Ele e ela"
- Artist: Madalena Iglésias
- Songwriter: Carlos Canelhas

Placement
- Final result: 13th, 6 points

Participation chronology

Portugal was represented at the Eurovision Song Contest 1966 with the song "Ele e ela", written by Carlos Canelhas, and performed by Madalena Iglésias. The Portuguese participating broadcaster, Radiotelevisão Portuguesa (RTP), selected its entry at the Grande Prémio TV da Canção Portuguesa 1966.

== Before Eurovision ==
=== Grande Prémio TV da Canção Portuguesa 1966 ===
Radiotelevisão Portuguesa (RTP) held the Grande Prémio TV da Canção Portuguesa 1966 on 15 January 1966 at 22:00 UTC at Tóbis studios in Lisbon, hosted by Maria Fernanda and Henrique Mendes. Eight songs took part in the final. Jorge Costa Pinto conducted all the songs. The winning song was chosen by a distrital jury, composed by three members, each had 5 votes to be distributed among the songs it intended to award, making a total of 15 votes per district.

Grande Prémio TV da Canção Portuguesa - 15 January 1966
R/O	Artist	Song	Votes	Place
1	João Maria Tudela	"Outono"	35	4
2	Madalena Iglésias	"Ele e ela"	81	1
3	Sérgio Borges	"Eu nunca direi adeus"	52	2
4	João Maria Tudela	"Ai, gracinha"	10	7
5	Madalena Iglésias	"Rebeldia"	42	3
6	António Calvário	"Encontro para amanhã"	26	5
7	Madalena Iglésias	"Caminhos perdidos"	19	6
8	Tony de Matos	"Nada e ninguém"	5	8

Detailed Distrital Jury Votes
R/O	Song	Aveiro	Beja	Braga	Bragança	Castelo Branco	Coimbra	Évora	Faro	Guarda	Leiria	Lisbon	Portalegre	Porto	Santarém	Setúbal	Viana do Castelo	Vila Real	Viseu	Total
1	"Outono"	1	4	4			1		1		4			12	2	1	1		4	35
2	"Ele e ela"	4	5	1	5	7	9	8	1	2	4	8		1	6	12	1	3	4	81
3	"Eu nunca direi adeus"	1	2		5	7		3	2	1	3	7	13				2		6	52
4	"Ai, gracinha"	4		1	1									2			1		1	10
5	"Rebeldia"		4			1	5	1	11	6	1				3		4	6		42
6	"Encontro para amanhã"	5		1	1			2		6					4	2	4	1		26
7	"Caminhos perdidos"			8	3			1									2	5		19
8	"Nada e ninguém"										3		2							5

== At Eurovision ==
On the night of the final Iglésias performed 8th in the running order, following Finland and preceding Austria. At the close of the voting the song had received 6 points, coming 13th in the field of 18 competing countries. The Portuguese jury awarded its 5 points to Spain.

The orchestra during the Portuguese entry was conducted by Jorge Costa Pinto.

=== Voting ===
Points awarded to Portugal
Score	Country
5 points	Spain
3 points	
1 point	Denmark

Points awarded by Portugal
Score	Country
5 points	Spain
3 points	Belgium
1 point	Austria
