= Erica Vaal =

Austrian actress, writer, radio host and presenter

- Born: 16 November 1927; Vienna, Austria
- Died: 17 October 2013 (aged 85); Staatz, Austria
- Education: Academy of Music and Expressive Arts
- Occupations: Actress, writer and presenter
- Spouse(s): Victor Pahlen (divorced); Robert Roberts (until her death)
- Children: 1 daughter

Erica Vaal (16 November 1927 – 17 October 2013) was an Austrian actress, writer, radio host and presenter. She was born in Vienna. She was best known for her work as an Austrian radio host. She was also a photographer.

== Education ==
She finished high school and her studies in acting at the Academy of Music and Expressive Arts in Vienna, the Reinhart Seminar.

== Career ==
=== Acting and Eurovision ===
She then moved to Rome where she performed in various theatres, TV plays, and international films such as The Journey (1959) directed by Anatole Litvak, Thunderstorm (1956) and various Italian films such as The Firemen of Viggiù (a film with Toto) and "Adam and Eve" (1949 film) as Ricky Denver. Acting engagements in Mexico, Spain, and Germany followed thereafter.

When she returned to Vienna, the Austrian Television chose her to host the “Grand Prix d’Eurovision de la Chanson 1967”, the Eurovision Song Contest 1967, speaking in seven languages. Erica Vaal continued her acting career in theaters throughout Germany and Austria.

Following the successful Eurovision broadcast, Ö3 the Austrian Television contracted Vaal to create and present programming, which included the radio hit “Musik aus Lateinamerica” among others. “Musik aus Lateinamerica” went on air to span 25 years. During her research for content, Vaal travelled frequently to Latin America and the Caribbean islands. She grasped and documented the mentality of the people, their customs, their music and their religions in depth and detail. Her radio show made her the unofficial coordinator and cultural representative of most Spanish speaking countries in Austria, mostly by the Embassies and Cultural Centres. Many Spanish speaking music related personality at that time were in her company throughout their Austrian stay - interviewed, escorted by, and translated for - by Vaal. She compiled an extensive body of research on Latin American culture and all music and religion related knowledge - ranging across the Latin American Countries, the Islands, and including Africa. In 1992 and 1993, she studied the dances of the African Gods at the University of Havana (“Instituto Superior de Arte”).

Vaal also wrote and moderated the international "Evergreens," "Musicals,""Stars von Druben," and 1 hour shows on Pop Musik for the Austrian Radio. "Evergreens" featured extensive German/Austrian. Her shows were broadcast in Austria, Germany, partly in the CH, and probably in northern Italy

=== Writing ===
Her experience took the literary form of “Where the sun dances”, ("Wo Die Sonne Tanzt") which was published by Austria Press. Her second book “Jineteras, a New Form of Prostitution in Cuba,” was published in Austria and Germany.

=== Photography ===
Vaal's first exhibition of photography, “The Flowers of the Fifth Avenue” (in black & white) was exhibited in the Museum of Ethnology (the “Völkerkundemuseum”) in Vienna, from December 1999 to February 2000. In November 2000, she created a calendar in colour, featuring Cuban Art which she named “Sabor Cubano”.

She devoted 2000-2010 to her experiences of Cuba.

== Personal life ==
Vaal married Victor Pahlen, a film producer. They have a daughter, Kyra Pahlen. Vaal then divorced Victor Pahlen. Vaal married Robert Roberts (a.k.a. Paul Roberts), an actor.

On 17 October 2013, Vaal died in Staatz, Austria, at the age of 86, 7 months before Austria's Eurovision Song Contest victory in Copenhagen.

== Filmography ==
- 1953 Ivan, Son of the White Devil - Myriam.
- 1956 Thunderstorm - Juana.
- 1957 Dort in der Wachau - Gelina
- 1959 The Journey - Donatella Calucci

== Additional sources ==
- http://www.reichhold.tv/erica_vaal.html
- http://www.musikergilde.at/index.php?cccpage=coda_aktuell_archiv_detail&set_z_m_coda_aktuell=139
- ^ O'Connor, John Kennedy. The Eurovision Song Contest - The Official History. Carlton Books, UK. 2007. ISBN 978-1-84442-994-3

| Preceded by (Luxembourg) Josiane Shen | Eurovision Song Contest presenter 1967 | Succeeded by (United Kingdom) Katie Boyle |
