= Belgium in the Eurovision Song Contest 1966 =

- Eurovision Song Contest 1966
- Participating broadcaster: Radiodiffusion-télévision belge (RTB)
- Country: Belgium
- Selection process: Artist: Internal selection Song: Avant-première Eurovision 1966
- Selection date: 25 January 1966

Competing entry
- Song: "Un peu de poivre, un peu de sel"
- Artist: Tonia
- Songwriters: Paul Quintens; Phil van Cauwenbergh

Placement
- Final result: 4th, 14 points

Participation chronology

Belgium was represented at the Eurovision Song Contest 1966 with the song "Un peu de poivre, un peu de sel", composed by Paul Quintens, with lyrics by Phil van Cauwenbergh, and performed by Tonia. The Belgian participating broadcaster, French-speaking Radiodiffusion-télévision belge (RTB), selected its entry through a national final, after having previously selected the performer internally.

== Before Eurovision ==
=== Artist selection ===
French-speaking broadcaster Radiodiffusion-télévision belge (RTB) internally selected Tonia to represent Belgium in the Eurovision Song Contest 1966. RTB asked her to represent Belgium in 1966 during the Knokke Cup in July 1965.

=== Avant-première Eurovision 1966 ===
Avant-première Eurovision was the national final format developed by RTB in order to select the Belgian entry for the Eurovision Song Contest 1966. The competition was held on 25 January 1966 and was broadcast on RTB.

==== Competing entries ====
Following announcement of Tonia as Belgian representative, song submission period was opened where composers were able to submit their songs. A professional jury along with Tonia shortlisted eight songs from 163 received songs, which were then whittled down to four for the contest.

==== Final ====
The final was held on 25 January 1966 from 20:30 to 21:10 CET, hosted by Jean-Claude Mennessier. Four songs competed in the contest with the winner being decided upon by public postcard voting.

Final – 25 January 1966
| R/O | Song | Songwriter(s) | | Votes | Place |
| R/O | Song | Composer | Lyricist | Votes | Place |
|---|---|---|---|---|---|
| 1 | "Un peu de poivre, un peu de sel" | Paul Quintens | Phil van Cauwenbergh | 3,765 | 1 |
| 2 | "Petite fleur de Chine" | Johnny Hot | | 2,498 | 4 |
| 3 | "Tu pourrais m'emmener danser" | Hector Delfosse | C. Runbel | 2,501 | 3 |
| 4 | "Un petit rien" | Roland Thyssen | Francis Etienne | 2,757 | 2 |

== At Eurovision ==
The contest was broadcast on RTB, BRT and radio station Premier Programme.

On the evening of the final Tonia performed 3rd in the running order, following Denmark and preceding Luxembourg. Each national jury awarded 5-3-1 point(s) to their top three songs, and at the close of the voting "Un peu de poivre, un peu de sel" had received 14 points (5 from Germany and the Netherlands, 3 from Portugal, and 1 from Sweden), placing Belgium joint 4th (with Ireland) of the 18 competing entries. This was Belgium's highest Eurovision finish to date, and would remain so until Jean Vallée's second place in 1978. The Belgian jury awarded its 5 points to contest winners Austria.

=== Voting ===
Points awarded to Belgium
| Score | Country |
|---|---|
| 5 points | Germany; Netherlands |
| 3 points | Portugal |
| 1 point | Sweden |

Points awarded by Belgium
| Score | Country |
|---|---|
| 5 points | Austria |
| 3 points | Ireland |
| 1 point | Germany |
