= Machrie Mhor =

Architectural structure in East Dunbartonshire, Scotland

Coordinates: 55.9171°N 4.1534°W

- Interactive map of the Machrie Mhor area

General information
- Architectural style: Queen Anne Revival
- Location: Lenzie, East Dunbartonshire, Scotland

Listed Building – Category C(S)
- Designated: 1977
- Reference no.: LB4410

Machrie Mhor is a villa on Victoria Road in Lenzie, East Dunbartonshire, Scotland. Built around 1920, the villa was once home to the Scottish tenor Kenneth McKellar (1927–2010).

The villa is built in the "Queen Anne Revival-style." The exterior is harled, with ashlar quoins and dressings. The double-fronted south facade has a Doric portico. Post 1997, the house has been extended to a total floor area of over 5,000 square feet (460 m^{2}). It has been a category C listed building since 17 August 1977.
