= Tonia (singer) =

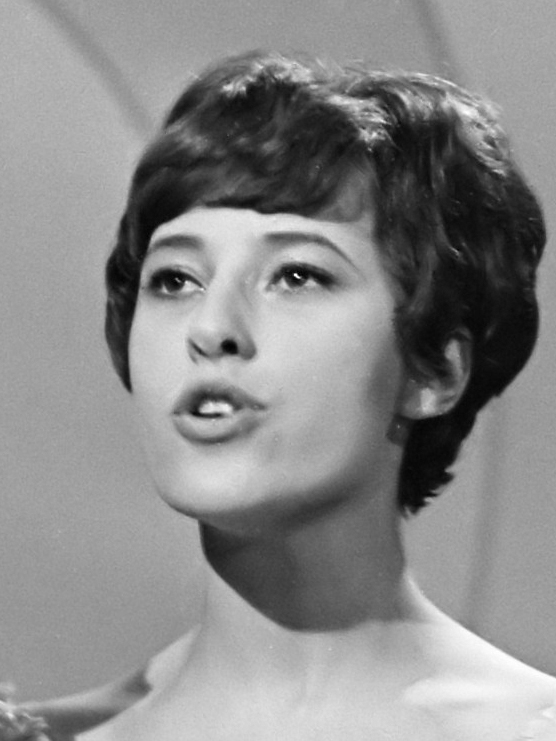
- Tonia (1968)

Background information
- Born: Arlette Antoine Dominicus; 25 July 1947 (age 79)
- Origin: Anderlecht, Belgium
- Genres: Pop
- Occupation: Singer

Tonia (born Arlette Antoine Dominicus, 25 July 1947, Anderlecht) is a Belgian singer, best known for her participation in the 1966 Eurovision Song Contest.

== Early career ==
Tonia released her first single, "Mon p'tit copain de vacances", in 1963, and went on to release numerous further singles. She would often record both Dutch and French cover versions of popular German songs.

== Eurovision Song Contest ==
In the 1966 Belgian Eurovision selection, Tonia performed four songs and the winner, "Un peu de poivre, un peu de sel" ("A Little Pepper, A Little Salt"), was chosen by postcard voting as the representative for the 11th Eurovision Song Contest, which took place on 5 March in Luxembourg City. "Un peu de poivre, un peu de sel" finished in fourth place of 18 entries, Belgium's highest placing in Eurovision to that date, which would not be bettered until 1978. In 1968, Tonia again participated in the Belgian selection with the song "Il y avait", but failed to place in the top two.

In 1973, Tonia took part in the German Eurovision national final with two songs, and narrowly missed out on a second Eurovision appearance when her song '"Sebastian" finished in second place, just one point behind the winning song "Junger Tag" by Gitte Hænning. Tonia's other song, "Mir gefällt diese Welt", came seventh.

== Later career ==
After her 1966 Eurovision appearance, Tonia turned her attention to the German market, where she enjoyed a measure of success for several years. By the mid-1970s her career was winding down and releases became sporadic. Her last recordings date from the early 1980s, although a compilation CD of her most successful tracks was released in 1990.

Tonia has been married twice, to musicians Albert Mertens and Paul Bourdiaudhy.

== Discography ==
Singles

- 1963 "Mon p'tit copain de vacances"
- 1963 "Avant de t'embrasser"
- 1963 "L'école est finie"
- 1963 "Trois mousquetaires"
- 1964 "La fin d'un amour n'est pas un drame"
- 1964 "Pour mon anniversaire je voudrais un beatle"
- 1965 "Wie heeft"
- 1965 "Ce n'est pas loin, domani"
- 1965 "Toujours les beaux jours"
- 1965 "Ist denn alles aus?"
- 1966 "Un peu de poivre, un peu de sel"
- 1966 "Un grand bateau"
- 1966 "Vorbei sind die Tränen"
- 1967 "Un tout petit pantin"
- 1967 "Joli petit poisson"
- 1967 "Der Gedanke an Dich"
- 1967 "Bonsoir, Chéri"
- 1968 "Karussell"
- 1968 "Weiter, immer weiter"
- 1969 "Texascowboypferdesattelverkäuferin"
- 1969 "Wenn die Nachtigall singt"
- 1971 "Ich will leben nur mit Dir"
- 1972 "Ein grünes Kleeblatt"
- 1973 "Sebastian"
- 1974 "Iedere Nacht is..."
- 1976 "Jahrmarkt der Eitelkeit"
- 1977 "Schönes Theater"
- 1980 "Warum rufst Du mich nicht an?"
- 1982 "Ich will nach Afrika"

Albums

- 1981 This Is My Day
- 1990 Les plus grand succès de Tonia

Preceded by Lize Marke with "Als het weer lente is"	Belgium in the Eurovision Song Contest; 1966	Succeeded by Louis Neefs with "Ik heb zorgen"
