= Denmark in the Eurovision Song Contest 1966 =

- Eurovision Song Contest 1966
- Participating broadcaster: Danmarks Radio (DR)
- Country: Denmark
- Selection process: Dansk Melodi Grand Prix 1966
- Selection date: 6 February 1966

Competing entry
- Song: "Stop – mens legen er go'"
- Artist: Ulla Pia
- Songwriter: Erik Kåre

Placement
- Final result: 14th, 4 points

Participation chronology

Denmark was represented at the Eurovision Song Contest 1966 with the song "Stop – mens legen er go'", written by Erik Kåre, and performed by Ulla Pia. The Danish participating broadcaster, Danmarks Radio (DR), organised the Dansk Melodi Grand Prix 1966 in order to select its entry for the contest.

DR withdrew from Eurovision following the 1966 contest, and would not return to the fold until 1978.

== Before Eurovision ==
=== Melodi Grand Prix 1966 ===
Danmarks Radio (DR) held its national final titled Melodi Grand Prix at the Tivoli Concert Hall in Copenhagen on 6 February 1966 at 21:00 CET (20:00 UTC). It was broadcast on DR TV. The national final was hosted by Sten Jørgensen, in collaboration with Liselotte Winkel. The artists were accompanied by a orchestra under the direction of Arne Lamberth. The winner was chosen by voting from seven regional juries. Former Danish representatives Gustav Winckler (1957) and Dario Campeotto (1961) were among the participants, although they ended up sharing last place.

Melodi Grand Prix – 6 February 1966
R/O	Artist	Song	Songwriter(s)	Points	Place
1	Gustav Winckler	"Salami"	Gunner Møller Pedersen	1	5
2	Anette Blegvad	"Melodien kan findes"	Vilfred Kjær	9	3
3	Sussie Faber	"Mon cœur"	Kurt Ard	16	2
4	Dario Campeotto	"Hjerte for hjerte"	Georg Lemke; Susanne Palsbo	1	5
5	Ib Hansen	"Lille veninde"	Helge Hampe; Herman Hoffmark	9	3
6	Ulla Pia	"Stop – mens legen er go'"	Erik Kåre	27	1

== At Eurovision ==
The contest was broadcast on DR TV, with commentary by Skat Nørrevig.

On the evening of the final Ulla Pia performed second in the running order, following Germany and preceding Belgium. "Stop – mens legen er go'" had a contemporary sound and featured an instrumental break during which two dancers performed an energetic routine. Each national jury awarded 5-3-1 to their top three songs, and at the close "Stop – mens legen er go'" had received 4 points (3 from Finland and 1 from Norway), placing Denmark 14th of the 18 entries. The Danish jury awarded its 5 points to Sweden.

=== Voting ===
Points awarded to Denmark
Score	Country
5 points	
3 points	Finland
1 point	Norway

Points awarded by Denmark
Score	Country
5 points	Sweden
3 points	Finland
1 point	Portugal
