= Dominique Walter =

French singer (1942–2013)

- Birth name: Dominique Gruère
- Born: 22 May 1942; Paris, France
- Died: 26 August 2013 (aged 71)
- Occupation: Singer
- Years active: 1965–1970

Dominique Walter (born Dominique Gruère, 22 May 1942 – 26 August 2013) was a French singer. He was born in Paris and is the son of singer Michèle Arnaud. In 1966, he represented France at the Eurovision Song Contest with the song Chez Nous. At the close of voting, it had received just 1 point, placing it 16th in a field of 18 competitors. Despite its poor performance at Eurovision, the record reportedly sold 100 000 times.

Serge Gainsbourg wrote seven songs for him between 1966 and 1969. For example, the title of 'Les Petits Boudins' (1967).

Preceded by Guy Mardel with N'avoue jamais	France in the Eurovision Song Contest; 1966	Succeeded by Noëlle Cordier with Il doit faire beau là-bas
