= Lill Lindfors =

Finnish-Swedish singer (born 1940)

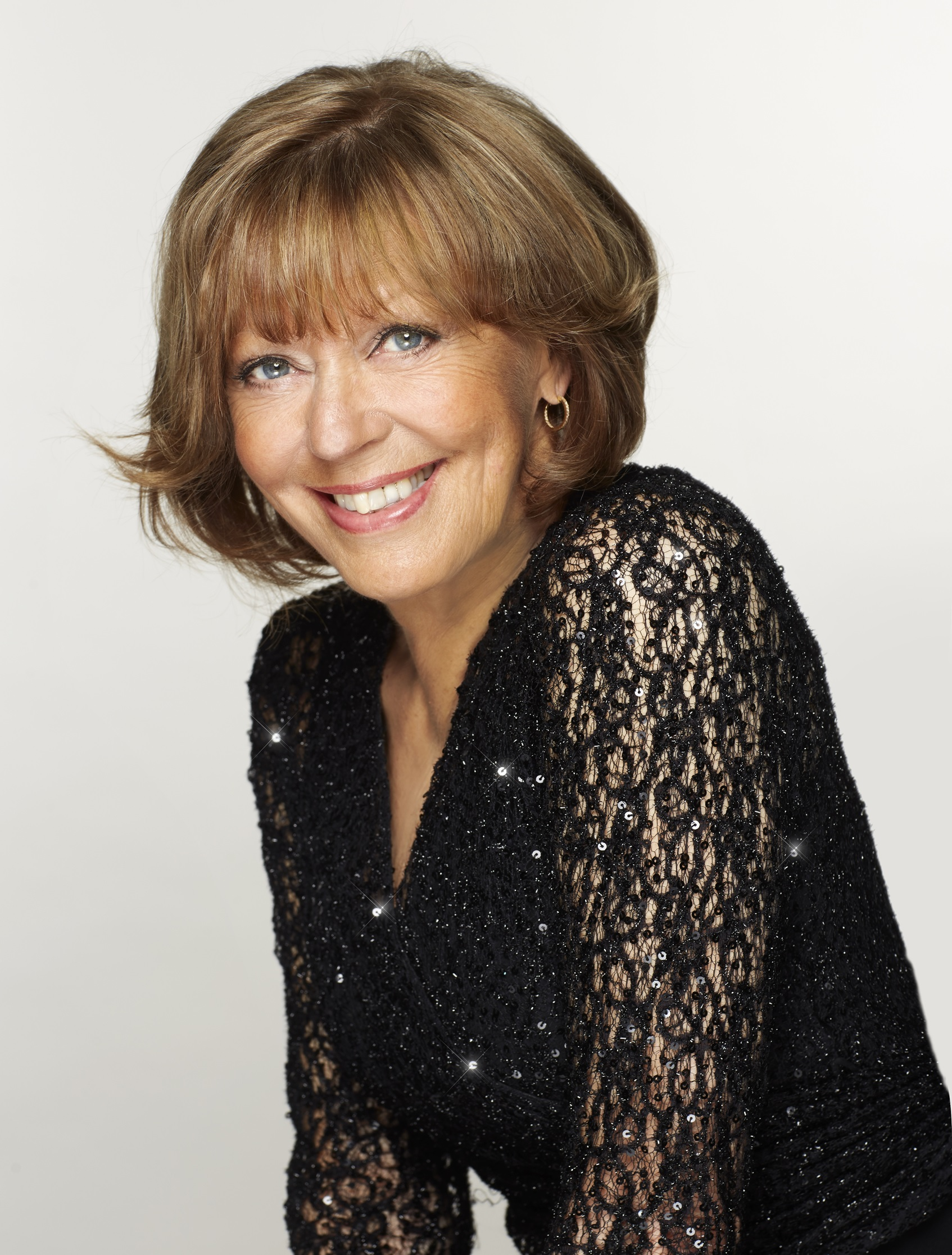
- Lindfors in 2013
- Born: Maj Lillemor Lindfors; 12 May 1940 (age 85); Helsinki, Finland
- Occupations: Singer; songwriter; musician
- Years active: 1960–present
- Spouses: Peter Wester (m. 1969; div. 1974); Anders Byström (m. 1991)
- Partner: Brasse Brännström (1974–1984)
- Children: 1
- Musical career
- Genres: Jazz; schlager; folk
- Instrument: Vocals

Maj Lillemor "Lill" Lindfors (born 12 May 1940) is a Swedish singer who has performed in Scandinavia since the 1960s. She and Svante Thuresson performed the song "Nygammal Vals" ("New, yet familiar waltz") as the Swedish entrants in the Eurovision Song Contest 1966.

== Career ==
Lindfors was born into a Swedish-speaking Finnish family in Helsinki, Finland, and she moved to Sweden with her family when she was eight years old. She made her debut as a revue actress in Uddevalla in 1960. The following year she made her first recording. In the most recent decades, Lindfors has been known in Scandinavia for her "one-woman shows" in which she mixes music with a lot of comedy. She was one of the first artists who sang samba in Sweden, and she was also one of the first Swedish performers who did stand-up comedy in her shows.

Eurovision Song Contest

Lindfors's performance of "Nygammal Vals" ("New, yet familiar waltz") with Svante Thuresson took second place in the Eurovision Song Contest 1966.

She was the presenter of the Eurovision Song Contest 1985 in Gothenburg, Sweden, and was most famous for (seemingly) having a wardrobe malfunction live, during the contest, after passing through a part of the elaborate set. She later admitted it was a gag, but that it had not been rehearsed beforehand. The EBU was reportedly not pleased with the stunt. It remains one of the most iconic moments in the contest's history. She also performed "Musik ska byggas utav glädje" ("My Joy Is Building Bricks of Music") as the contest's major opener.

Others

She has starred in several Swedish TV shows which have won awards in Montreux.

In 1998, she became Sweden's Goodwill Ambassador to UNICEF.

== Personal life ==
Lindfors lives in Stockholm, Sweden. She married director Peter Wester in 1969 and they had a daughter Petronella. They were divorced in 1974. She was then in relationship with the actor Brasse Brännström from 1974 to 1984. Since 1991 she has been married to the director Anders Byström.

== Discography ==
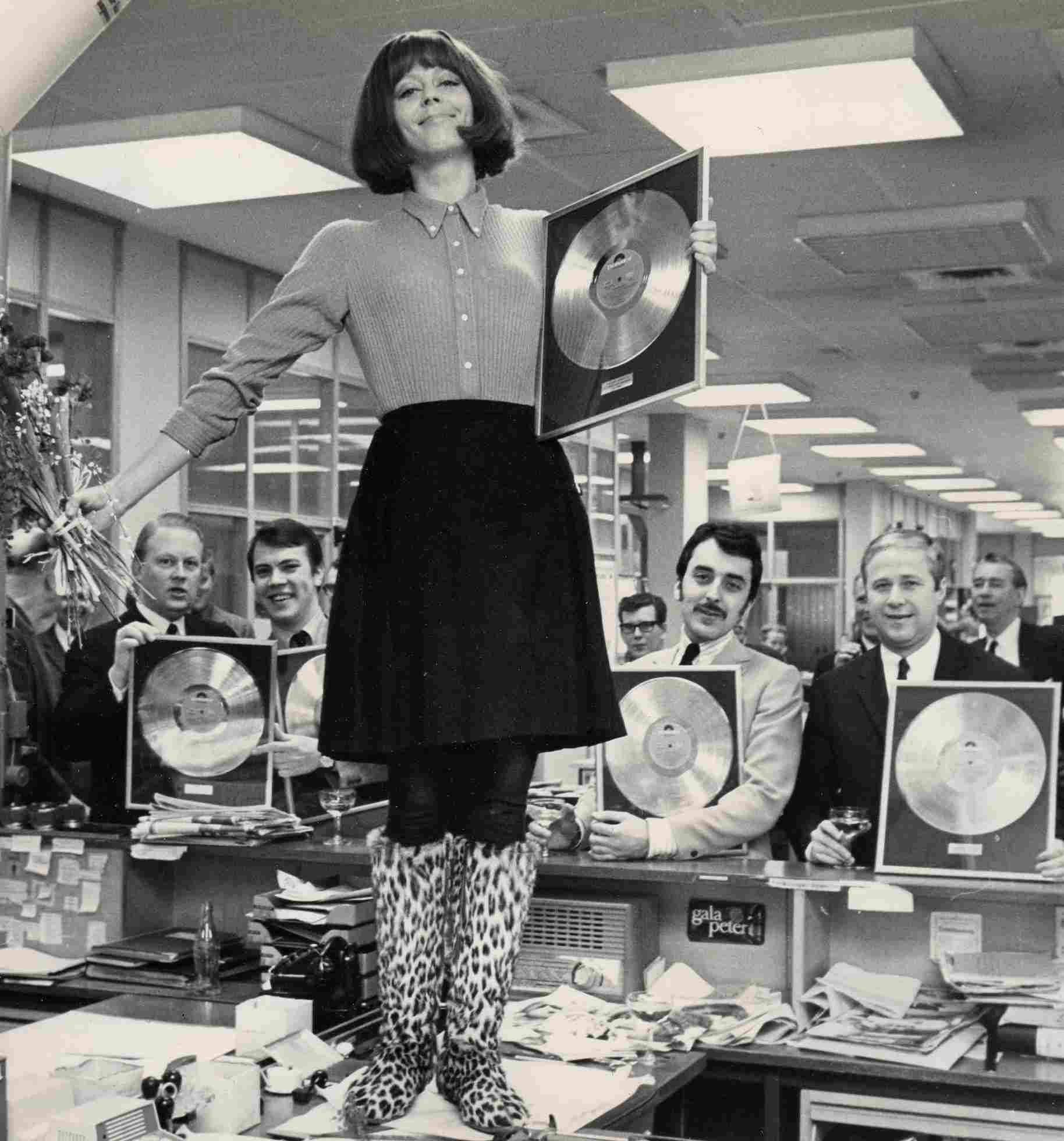
Lill Lindfors showing her gold record alongside Bo Setterlind, Marcus Österdahl, Curt Peterson & Ivan Nordström (3 May 1968)

=== Albums ===
- 1964: Adam och Eva (with Owe Thörnqvist)
- 1967: Påsen (with Anders Linder)
- 1967: Du är den ende
- 1968: Kom i min värld
- 1970: Albin & Greta (with Svante Thuresson)
- 1970: Vi har varann
- 1970: Mellan dröm och verklighet
- 1971: Sång
- 1973: Kom igen!

Year	Album	Peak positions
Year	Album	SWE
1975	"Fritt Fram"	16
1976	En sång att ta hem	16
1978	Du är det varmaste jag har	2
1980	Och människor ser igen	34
1984	Jag vill nå dig	19
1986	Om du var här	27
1990	Glädjor	43
1997	Utan gränser	42
2002	Ingen är så go' som du	15
2004	Lills bästa	20
2006	Här är den sköna sommaren	12
2013	Det bästa med Lill	17

=== Singles ===
(Selective)

- 1966: "Du är den ende" ("Romance")
- 1967: "En sån karl" ("Just Like a Man")
- 1967: "Hör min samba"
- 1968: "En man i byrån" ("If You Can Put That in a Bottle")
- 1968: "Teresa"
- 1969: "Mellan dröm och verklighet"
- 1970: "Axel Öhman" (duet with Svante Thuresson)
- 1973: "Månskugga"
- 1973: "Sången han sjöng var min egen" ("Killing Me Softly with His Song")
- 1978: "Om du nånsin kommer fram till Samarkand"
- 1978: "Tillsammans är ett sätt att finnas till"
- 1984: "Marias första dans"

== See also ==
- List of Eurovision Song Contest presenters

Preceded by (Luxembourg) Désirée Nosbusch	Eurovision Song Contest presenter 1985	Succeeded by (Norway) Åse Kleveland
Preceded by Ingvar Wixell with "Absent Friend"	Sweden in the Eurovision Song Contest (with Svante Thuresson); 1966	Succeeded by Östen Warnerbring with "Som en dröm"
