= United Kingdom in the Eurovision Song Contest 1966 =

- Eurovision Song Contest 1966
- Participating broadcaster: British Broadcasting Corporation (BBC)
- Country: United Kingdom
- Selection process: Artist: Internal selection Song: A Song for Europe 1966
- Selection date: 27 January 1966

Competing entry
- Song: "A Man Without Love"
- Artist: Kenneth McKellar
- Songwriters: Cyril Ornadel; Peter Callander

Placement
- Final result: 9th, 8 points

Participation chronology

The United Kingdom was represented at the Eurovision Song Contest 1966 with the song "A Man Without Love", composed by Cyril Ornadel, with lyrics by Peter Callander, and performed by Kenneth McKellar. The British participating broadcaster, the British Broadcasting Corporation (BBC), selected its entry through a national final, after having previously selected the performer internally.

== Before Eurovision ==
=== A Song for Europe 1966 ===
The British Broadcasting Corporation (BBC) held a national preselection to choose the song that would go to the Eurovision Song Contest 1966, with the BBC selecting Kenneth McKellar to perform all the entries under consideration. After performing the five shortlisted songs weekly on BBC1's Kenneth McKellar's A Song For Everyone, the final was held on 27 January 1966 and presented by David Jacobs. McKellar released an extended play maxi single featuring the five songs, subsequently releasing a single featuring the winner and the runner up, which reached number 30 in the UK Singles Chart.

Viewers cast votes on postcards via mail to choose the winning song, which was "A Man Without Love". At the Eurovision Song Contest, McKellar performed last in the contest, finishing ninth out of 18 entries, the worst showing to date for a British entry; a record maintained until 1978.

R/O	Song	Place
1	"Country Girl"	3
2	"As Long As the Sun Shines"	2
3	"Comes the Time"	4
4	"A Touch of the Tartan"	5
5	"A Man Without Love"	1

== At Eurovision ==
"A Man Without Love" won the national and went on to come ninth in the contest.

For the sixth and final time, David Jacobs provided the commentary for BBC Television. British Forces Radio also broadcast the contest with commentary provided by Ian Fenner. The BBC appointed Michael Aspel as its spokesperson to announce the British jury vote.

=== Voting ===
Points awarded to the United Kingdom
Score	Country
5 points	Ireland
3 points	Luxembourg
1 point	

Points awarded by the United Kingdom
Score	Country
5 points	Yugoslavia
3 points	Spain
1 point	Netherlands
