= Svante Thuresson =

Swedish jazz musician (1937–2021)

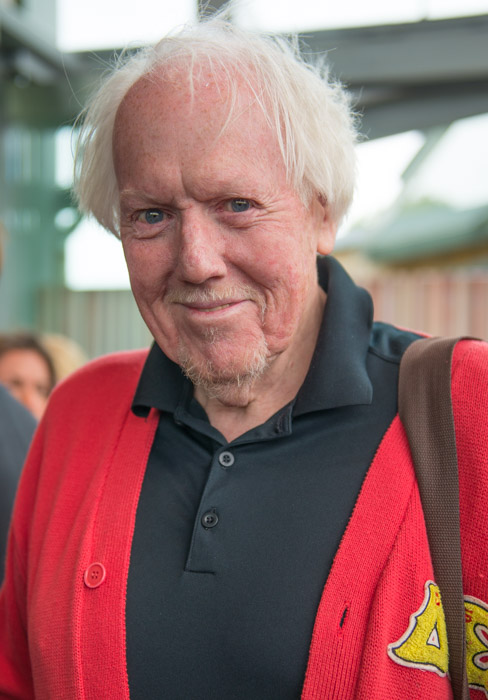
- Thuresson in June 2015

Background information
- Born: 7 February 1937; Stockholm, Sweden
- Died: 10 May 2021 (aged 84) Stockholm, Sweden
- Genres: Jazz, Schlager, soul
- Occupation: Singer
- Years active: 1963–2021
- Label: Metronome

Svante Thuresson (7 February 1937 – 10 May 2021) was a Swedish jazz musician. He started his career as a drummer before joining the band Gals and Pals in 1963. Svante won the national selection and represented Sweden in the Eurovision song contest in 1966 with Nygammal vals ("New, Old-Fashioned Waltz") and came in second place; he performed with Lill Lindfors.

In 2007, Thuresson and Anne-Lie Rydé performed at Melodifestivalen 2007 as a duo in hopes of represent Sweden in the Eurovision, but failed to make it to the final.

He died from a long-term illness on 10 May 2021, at the age of 84.

== Discography ==
- 1967 – Doktor Dolittle with Siw Malmkvist, Per Myrberg and Fred Åkerström
- 1968 – Du ser en man
- 1969 – Nyanser
- 1970 – Noaks ark
- 1970 – Albin och Greta with Lill Lindfors
- 1972 – Danspartaj 1
- 1975 – Den första valsen
- 1978 – Discohits
- 1979 – Den är till dej
- 1982 – Just in time with Hector Bingert
- 1986 – Pelle Svanslös
- 1993 – Live
- 1993 – En salig man
- 1995 – Jag är hip, baby
- 1998 – Vi som älskar och slåss
- 2000 – Guldkorn (Samling)
- 2002 – Nya kickar
- 2004 – Svante Thuressons bästa
- 2005 – Box of pearls with Katrine Madsen
- 2007 – Svante Thuresson & Vänner
- 2011 – Regionala Nyheter: Stockholmsdelen
- 2011 – En cool jul

== Singles and EPs for the Metronome label (1966–73) ==
- 1966 – Nygammal vals (med Ulla Hallin)– Hej systrar, hej bröder
- 1966 – Jag har nära nog nästan allt – Mulliga Maj
- 1966 – Hej systrar hej bröder – Nygammal vals (With Ulla Hallin) – Mulliga Maj – Jag har nära nog nästan allt
- 1967 – Fem minuter till – Nära mej
- 1967 – Den sista valsen – Vintervalsen
- 1968 – Du vet så väl (att jag behöver dej) – Från och med nu
- 1968 – Min Rockefeller – Var finns det ord (with Siw Malmkvist)
- 1968 – Du är en vårvind i April – Det känns skönt – det känns bra
- 1968 – Baby I need your lovin' – Just one word from you
- 1968 – Leva mitt liv – Du ser en man
- 1968 – Jag vill ha all din kärlek – Maria Marlene
- 1969 – Under sol, under hav – Simma (Promo)
- 1969 – Vackraste paret i världen – Jag är kvinna, du är man with Siw Malmkvist
- 1969 – Sommarflicka – Under sol, över hav
- 1969 – Jag tror att jag är kär i dej, Maria – Det svänger om det mesta
- 1970 – Nyanser – Kärlekens fjäril
- 1970 – Noaks ark – Vill hellre ha en sommar
- 1970 – Håll mig nära – Ingen gör någonting
- 1970 – När jag putsar fönster – Det svänger så skönt om barockens musik
- 1971 – En sommardag – Vem kan svara på min fråga (Promo)
- 1971 – Soldater som vill va' hjältar – Jag ska vara hos dej i kväll
- 1973 – Vår egen gata – Dröm ur dina drömmars glas

== Filmography ==
- 1961 – Åsa–Nisse bland grevar och baroner
- 1986 – Bambi (Swedish voice)
- 1993–1995 – De vilda djurens flykt (Swedish voice)
- 1994 – The Lion King (Swedish voice of Rafiki)
- 2005 – Robots (Swedish voice)

Awards and achievements
Preceded by Ingvar Wixell with "Absent Friend"	Sweden in the Eurovision Song Contest (with Lill Lindfors); 1966	Succeeded by Östen Warnerbring with "Som en dröm"
