= Ossi Runne =

Finnish trumpeter (1927–2020)

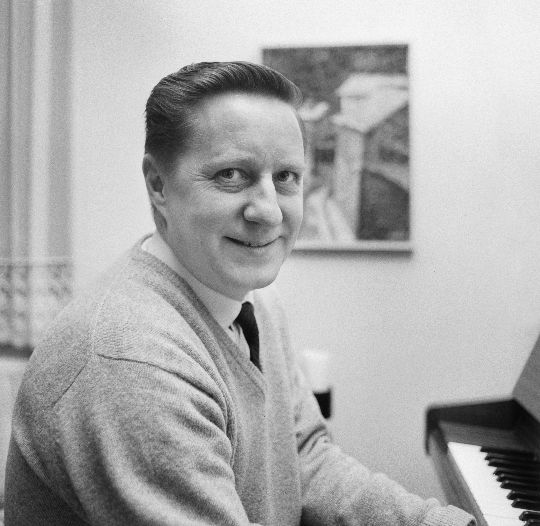
- Ossi Runne in 1966
- Born: Yrjö Osvald Rundberg; 23 April 1927; Viipuri, Finland
- Died: 5 November 2020 (aged 93); Helsinki, Finland
- Occupation: conductor

Ossi Runne (23 April 1927 – 5 November 2020) was a Finnish trumpeter, orchestra leader, composer, and record producer.

== Career ==
He changed his name to Runne in 1936, and in the early part of his career was known as a trumpeter and an orchestra leader. Upon his return to Finland from the post of conductor for the China Variety Orchestra in Stockholm in 1957, he joined the Musiikki-Fazer company as a studio manager. In 1965 he moved to Yleisradio and became head conductor of the national radio orchestra; later he led the TV 1 orchestra as well. He retired from both positions in 1992.

He is most recognized for conducting Finland's entries at the Eurovision Song Contest. He first conducted the entry "Playboy" (which he also composed) at Luxembourg in 1966. Runne would go on to conduct 22 Finnish entries, ending in 1989. In addition, he was also the Yleisradio Eurovision commentator in 1981 and 1990.

He wrote an autobiography, Trumpetilla ja tahtipuikolla (“With the trumpet and the baton”) in 2003.

== List of bands affiliated with Runne ==
- Ossi Runne Quintet (director, trumpeter 1944–1945)
- Ossi Aalto Orchestra (trumpeter 1945–1948)
- Toivo Kärki (trumpeter 1948–1949)
- Olle Lindström Orchestra (trumpeter 1950–1951)
- Erkki Aho Orchestra (trumpeter 1951–1953)
- Ossi Runne Orchestra (band leader, trumpeter 1954–1955)
- Al Stefano Orchestra (trumpeter 1955–1956)
- China Variety Orchestra (conductor 1956–1957)
- Yleisradio Orchestra (conductor 1965–1992)
- Karelia Wind Band (band director 1986–2003)
