= Dickie Rock =

Irish singer (1936–2024)

- Born: Richard Rock; 10 October 1936; Dublin, Ireland
- Died: 6 December 2024 (aged 88) Dublin, Ireland
- Occupations: Singer; songwriter
- Instrument: Vocals
- Years active: 1963–2021
- Spouse: Judy Murray (m. 1966; died 2022)

Richard Rock (10 October 1936 – 6 December 2024) was an Irish singer. Chiefly associated with the era of showbands in Ireland, Rock came to prominence as a member of The Miami Showband in the 1960s, subsequently becoming a solo artist in 1973. He represented Ireland in the Eurovision Song Contest 1966. Rock continued to tour for several decades until his retirement in 2021.

== Early career ==
Rock was born on 10 October 1936 in the North Strand, Dublin, and raised in Cabra on Dublin's Northside.

Between 1963 and 1972, he was one of the frontmen of the Miami Showband, who were later in the headlines due to the Miami Showband killings incident. He had 13 top-ten hits with the Miami Showband, including seven number ones. Dickie Rock and the Miami Showband were the first Irish artists to go straight into the number one spot with "Every Step of the Way" in 1965. During his time with the Miami Showband, Rock attracted the kind of mass hysteria normally reserved for the Beatles.

In 1966, he sang for Ireland in the Eurovision Song Contest 1966 with the song, "Come Back to Stay". He entered as a solo artist and finished joint fourth (with Belgium). This song also became a number one hit in Ireland.

== Solo years ==
Rock went solo in 1973, although he still performed occasionally with the Miami Showband after this.

== Later years ==
Rock continued to tour well into his eighties. Following a third RTÉ documentary (one in the 1960s, another in the 1980s and another in 2006) about Rock and his place at the forefront of the Irish showband scene, he received a lifetime achievement award in October 2009. In 2019, he announced his final tour would be held in October that year. In 2021, at the age of 84, Rock retired from showbusiness, suffering from hearing problems.

== Personal life and death ==
Rock married Judy Murray in 1966. She died in April 2022, several weeks after contracting COVID-19.

Rock died at St. Vincent's University Hospital in Dublin, on 6 December 2024, at the age of 88. He was buried in Cabra on 12 December 2024, after a funeral mass celebrated by Brian D'Arcy at the Church of the Most Precious Blood.

== Discography ==
Irish chart singles

- 1963 "There's Always Me" (IR #1)
- 1964 "I'm Yours" (#1)
- 1964 "From the Candy Store On the Corner" (#1)
- 1965 "Just for Old Time's Sake" (#2)
- 1965 "Round and Round" (#2)
- 1965 "Every Step of the Way" (#1)
- 1965 "I Left My Heart in San Francisco" (#4)
- 1965 "Wishing it Was You" (#1)
- 1966 "Come Back to Stay" (#1)
- 1966 "Darling I Love You" (#4)
- 1967 "When You Cry" (#7)
- 1967 "Baby I'm Your Man" (#13)
- 1968 "Simon Says" (#1)
- 1968 "Christmas Time and You" (#10)
- 1969 "Emily" (#12)
- 1970 "When My Train Comes In" (#15)
- 1971 "My Heart Keeps Telling Me" (#7)
- 1971 "Cathedral in the Pines" (#15)
- 1972 "Till (Mini Monster)" (#9)
- 1973 "The Last Waltz" (#15) – first solo single
- 1973 "Maxi single" (#11)
- 1977 "Back Home Again" (#1)
- 1978 "It's Almost Like a Song" (#18)
- 1980 "Coward of the County" (#11)
- 1982 "When the Swallows Come Back from Capistrano" (#24)
- 1988 "The Wedding" (#18)
- 1989 "I'll Never Stop Wanting You" (#10)
- 1989 "Come Home to Ireland for Christmas" (#25)

Awards and achievements
Preceded by Butch Moore with "Walking the Streets in the Rain"	Ireland in the Eurovision Song Contest; 1966	Succeeded by Sean Dunphy with "If I Could Choose"
