= Finland in the Eurovision Song Contest 1966 =

- Eurovision Song Contest 1966
- Participating broadcaster: Yleisradio (Yle)
- Country: Finland
- Selection process: National final
- Selection date: 22 January 1966

Competing entry
- Song: "Playboy"
- Artist: Ann-Christine
- Songwriter: Ossi Runne

Placement
- Final result: 10th, 7 points

Participation chronology

Finland was represented at the Eurovision Song Contest 1966 with the song "Playboy", written by Ossi Runne, and performed by Ann-Christine. The Finnish participating broadcaster, Yleisradio (Yle), selected its entry through a national final.

== Before Eurovision ==
=== National final ===
Nine entries were selected for the competition from 200 received submissions. Yleisradio (Yle) held the national final on 22 January 1966 at its studios in Helsinki. The final was not broadcast live since it had been recorded earlier in the afternoon. The show was hosted by Tuula Ignatius and Risto Vanari. The winner was chosen by a professional jury consisting of twelve members. Each juror distributed their points as follows: either 1, 3 and 5 points for three songs, or 3 and 6 points for two songs. Since the first round did not end up in an absolute win, the second round was held between the top 3.

Advanced to second round

Final – 22 January 1966 – first round
R/O	Artist	Song	Songwriter(s)	Points	Place
1	Tamara Lund	"Märkää asfalttia"	Toivo Kärki; Terttu Suni	8	6
2	Ilkka Rinne	"Syysromanssi"	Börje Sundgren	1	9
3	Carola	"Meren laulu"	Matti Murto; Ritva Murto	11	5
4	Viktor Klimenko	"Vieras rakastettuni"	Jaakko Borg; Tuula Valkama	20	2
5	Laila Kinnunen	"Muistojen bulevardi"	Börje Sundgren; Solja Tuuli	20	2
6	Danny	"Pieni sana"	Lasse Mårtenson; Sauvo Puhtila	5	8
7	Marjatta Leppänen	"Aamuyön tanssi"	Åke Granholm; Sauvo Puhtila	8	6
8	Lasse Mårtenson	"Ken hän on?"	Lasse Mårtenson; Sauvo Puhtila	13	4
9	Ann-Christine Nyström	"Playboy"	Ossi Runne	22	1

Final – 22 January 1966 – second round
Artist	Song	Songwriter(s)	Points	Place
Viktor Klimenko	"Vieras rakastettuni"	Jaakko Borg, Tuula Valkama	25	3
Laila Kinnunen	"Muistojen bulevardi"	Börje Sundgren; Solja Tuuli	29	2
Ann-Christine Nyström	"Playboy"	Ossi Runne	45	1

== At Eurovision ==
On the evening of the final Ann-Christine performed seventh in the running order, following Norway and preceding Portugal. It was the first Finnish entry conducted by Ossi Runne, who would conduct the Finnish Eurovision entry 22 times. At the close of voting, Finland picked up seven points and placed joint 10th with Germany and Luxembourg of the 18 entries.

The 10-member Finnish jury comprised Cay Idström (chairperson), Benedict Zilliacus, Jutta Zilliacus, Esko Mustonen, Juhani Valsta, Antti Wahlström, Mrs. Bojen Huldén, Albert Pelli, Leena Lehtonen, and Anssi Sinnemäki.

The contest was broadcast on TV-ohjelma 1 and on radio station Yleisohjelma, both with commentary by Aarno Walli. It was also broadcast on Swedish-language radio station Ruotsinkielinen ula-ohjelma.

=== Voting ===
Points awarded to Finland
Score	Country
5 points	
3 points	Denmark; Norway
1 point	Netherlands

Points awarded by Finland
Score	Country
5 points	Sweden
3 points	Denmark
1 point	Yugoslavia
