= Ireland in the Eurovision Song Contest 1966 =

- Eurovision Song Contest 1966
- Participating broadcaster: Radio Éireann (RÉ)
- Country: Ireland
- Selection process: National Song Contest
- Selection date: 25 January 1966

Competing entry
- Song: "Come Back to Stay"
- Artist: Dickie Rock
- Songwriter: Rowland Soper

Placement
- Final result: 4th, 14 points

Participation chronology

Ireland was represented at the Eurovision Song Contest 1966 with the song "Come Back to Stay", written by Rowland Soper, and performed by Dickie Rock. The Irish participating broadcaster, Radio Éireann (RÉ), selected its entry through a national final.

== Before Eurovision ==
=== National Song Contest ===
The second edition of the National Song Contest was held on Tuesday 25 January 1966 by RÉ TV in Dublin. 12 songs were drawn out of the 500 songs that were submitted. Brendan O'Reilly was the host. The national final was broadcast on Telefís Éireann and Radió Éireann.

R/O	Artist	Song	Points	Place
1	Deirdre Wynne	"There's No Sense In Being A Fool"	4	5
2	Dickie Rock	"Come Back to Stay"	20	1
3	The Ludlows	"A Sailor Will Sail"	3	8
4	Butch Moore	"I See Your Face"	0	10
5	Sonny Knowles	"The Menace From Ennis"	0	10
6	Deirdre Wynne	"Why Don't You Say It's So?"	8	3
7	Dickie Rock	"Can't Make Up My Mind"	4	5
8	Butch Moore	"Why Don't I Believe In Her?"	7	4
9	Sonny Knowles	"Chuaigh Mé Suas Don Chluiche Mór"	0	10
10	The Ludlows	"The Winds Thro' The Rafters"	9	2
11	Dickie Rock	"Oh! Why?"	1	9
12	Deirdre Wynne	"Haven't You?"	4	5

== At Eurovision ==
Ireland started at placement 17th at the end of the start field and finished 4th place with 14 points.

=== Voting ===
Points awarded to Ireland
Score	Country
5 points	France
3 points	Belgium; Netherlands; Yugoslavia
1 point	

Points awarded by Ireland
Score	Country
5 points	United Kingdom
3 points	Switzerland
1 point	Netherlands
