= Berta Ambrož =

Yugoslav Slovene singer

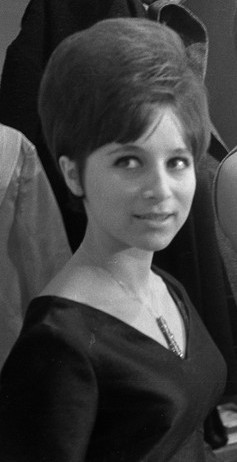
- Ambrož in 1965
- Born: 29 October 1944; Krainburg, Operational Zone of the Adriatic Littoral
- Died: 1 July 2003 (aged 58); Ljubljana, Slovenia
- Occupation: Soundtrack
- Years active: 1966-1966

Berta Ambrož (29 October 1944 – 1 July 2003) was a Yugoslav Slovene singer. She is best known for representing Yugoslavia in the Eurovision Song Contest 1966 with the song "Brez besed" (Without Words).

Preceded by Vice Vukov with Brodovi	Yugoslavia in the Eurovision Song Contest; 1966	Succeeded by Lado Leskovar with Vse rože sveta
