= Kenneth McKellar (singer) =

Scottish tenor

- Born: Kenneth McKellar; 23 June 1927; Paisley, Renfrewshire, Scotland
- Died: 9 April 2010 (aged 82) South Lake Tahoe, California, United States
- Genres: Comedy music Folk music
- Occupations: Singer
- Years active: 1947–1996
- Labels: Parlophone; Decca Records

Kenneth McKellar (23 June 1927 – 9 April 2010) was a Scottish tenor.

== Career ==
McKellar studied forestry at the University of Aberdeen and after graduating he worked for the Scottish Forestry Commission. He later trained at the Royal College of Music as an opera singer. He did not enjoy his time with the Carl Rosa Opera Company and left them to pursue a career singing traditional Scottish songs and other works.

From 1959 to 1977 he frequently toured the United States and Canada with other Scottish entertainers such as Helen McArthur, often appearing in small local venues.

From 1957 he starred each year in innovative pantomimes by Howard & Wyndham Ltd notably at their Alhambra Theatre Glasgow. In 1958–59 he played Jacob Bray in a successful revival of 'Old Chelsea' by Richard Tauber, along with Vanessa Lee and Peter Graves, which opened in Glasgow and then toured. For a decade from 1960 he starred as Jamie in the new pantomimes devised around him, starting with A Wish For Jamie, followed by A Love For Jamie, which ran at the Alhambra in each of five years, accompanied by Rikki Fulton, and moved after to Edinburgh, Aberdeen and Newcastle. He described these years as the most fulfilling of his stage life outside his international recording career.

McKellar toured New Zealand in 1964. On many occasions in the 1960s and 1970s he appeared on the BBC Television Hogmanay celebration programme, alongside Jimmy Shand, Andy Stewart and Moira Anderson. He also made numerous appearances on the popular White Heather Club television series (1959–1968), hosted by Andy Stewart. His last Hogmanay Show appearance was on STV in 1991.

In 1965, the BBC selected McKellar to represent the UK in the Eurovision Song Contest in Luxembourg. He sang five titles from which viewers selected "A Man Without Love" as the 1966 entry. According to the author and historian John Kennedy O'Connor's The Eurovision Song Contest – The Official History, the Scottish tenor – who had changed into a kilt at the last moment – drew gasps from the audience when he appeared on stage. The song was placed ninth of the eighteen entries, making it the least successful UK placing in the contest until 1978. McKellar received scores from only two countries. The Irish jury gave the UK song top marks, one of only two occasions the Irish have done so in Eurovision history.

"A Man Without Love" peaked at #30 in the UK Singles Chart in March 1966. His albums The World of Kenneth McKellar (1969), and Eco Di Napoli (1970), had a total of ten weeks presence in the UK Albums Chart. McKellar starred in a BBC TV film in 1969 Eco Di Napoli on which the album was based. This was filmed in Italy, with McKellar singing in Italian and Neapolitan.

He also recorded an album in Afrikaans, entitled Kuier By Ons, which was released just before his tour of South Africa in October 1970.

On 31 December 1973, the first Scottish commercial radio station Radio Clyde began broadcasting to Glasgow. The first record they played was "Song of the Clyde" sung by Kenneth McKellar. The same recording featured over the opening titles of the 1963 film Billy Liar.

McKellar lived in Lenzie, Glasgow in a house called "Machrie Mhor".

Outside music, McKellar wrote a sketch, involving a blindfolded man trying to identify the name of the celebrity beating him up, which was performed by the Monty Python team at The Secret Policeman's Ball. This was the only time they performed a sketch written by a non-member.

McKellar made most of his recordings on the Decca Records label. He also recorded several classical works, including Handel's Messiah alongside Joan Sutherland in a performance conducted by Sir Adrian Boult. After he left Decca in the 1970s he recorded from 1983 to 1996 for Lismor records, recording several albums, including Songs of the Jacobite Risings, before retiring in the late 1990s.

McKellar also recorded the musical Kismet with Robert Merrill. He was also notable for his recordings of Gaelic songs in translation such as the Songs of the Hebrides arrangements by Marjory Kennedy-Fraser.

In 1992 McKellar was offered an OBE, but declined it. During his lifetime he chose not to make public the news of the offer, nor his reasons for refusing it.

== Death ==
McKellar died of pancreatic cancer, at the age of 82, at his daughter's home in South Lake Tahoe in the United States, on 9 April 2010. His funeral was in Paisley.

== Selected discography ==
- Kenneth McKellar 1958 Decca LK 4203
- Roamin' In The Gloamin' 1959 Decca LK 4295
- Songs of the Outer Hebrides 1961 Decca Lk 4399
- Scottish Saturday Night 1962 Decca SKL 4502
- Songs of Ireland 1964 TW 91321

Awards and achievements
Preceded by Kathy Kirby with "I Belong"	United Kingdom in the Eurovision Song Contest; 1966	Succeeded by Sandie Shaw with "Puppet on a String"
