= Sweden in the Eurovision Song Contest 1966 =

- Eurovision Song Contest 1966
- Participating broadcaster: Sveriges Radio (SR)
- Country: Sweden
- Selection process: National final
- Selection date: 29 January 1966

Competing entry
- Song: "Nygammal vals"
- Artist: Lill Lindfors and Svante Thuresson
- Songwriters: Bengt-Arne Wallin; Björn Lindroth

Placement
- Final result: 2nd, 16 points

Participation chronology

Sweden was represented at the Eurovision Song Contest 1966 with the song "Nygammal vals", composed by Bengt-Arne Wallin, with lyrics by Björn Lindroth, and performed by Lill Lindfors and Svante Thuresson. The Swedish participating broadcaster, Sveriges Radio (SR), selected its entry through a national final titled Svensk sångfinal.

Sweden scored 16 points and finished in 2nd place at the contest in Luxembourg, its highest ever placement at the time.

== Before Eurovision ==
=== Svensk sångfinal ===
Svensk sångfinal (retroactively often referred to as Melodifestivalen 1966) was the selection for the eighth song to represent Sweden at the Eurovision Song Contest, held at the Cirkus in Stockholm on 29 January 1966. It was the seventh time that Sveriges Radio (SR) used this system of picking a song. 898 songs were submitted to SR for the competition. Regional juries selected the winning song. The show was hosted by Sven Lindahl and was broadcast on Sveriges Radio TV but was not broadcast on radio.

R/O	Artist	Song	Songwriters	Points	Place
1	Svante Thuresson	"Hej systrar, hej bröder"	Åke Gerhard	6	7
2	Monica Nielsen	"En röd vals"	Jan Johansson; Kerstin Bergström	5	8
3	Carli Tornehave	"Monte Carlo"	Bengt-Arne Wallin; Carl Gyllenberg	19	2
4	Gunilla af Malmborg	"Var finns du?"	Ulf Björlin; Lars Forssell	8	5
5	Gunnar Wiklund	"Vinterrosor"	Britt Lindeborg	14	3
6	Lill Lindfors and Svante Thuresson	"Nygammal vals"	Bengt-Arne Wallin; Björn Lindroth	26	1
7	Ann-Louise Hanson	"En ballad om för längesen"	Robert Meyer; Gösta Rybrant	9	4
8	Carli Tornehave	"Härliga Söndag"	Bo-Göran Edling; Peter Himmelstrand	8	5
9	Gunwer Bergqvist	"Vårens vindar"	Torbjörn Lundqvist; Maud Lundqvist	4	9
10	Gunnar Wiklund	"Vad har jag kvar"	Berndt Öst; Peter Himmelstrand	0	10

== At Eurovision ==
=== Voting ===
Points awarded to Sweden
Score	Country
5 points	Denmark; Finland; Norway
3 points	
1 point	Switzerland

Points awarded by Sweden
Score	Country
5 points	Luxembourg
3 points	Norway
1 point	Belgium
