= Yugoslavia in the Eurovision Song Contest 1966 =

- Eurovision Song Contest 1966
- Participating broadcaster: Jugoslavenska radiotelevizija (JRT)
- Country: Yugoslavia
- Selection process: Jugovizija 1966
- Selection date: 23 January 1966

Competing entry
- Song: "Brez besed"
- Artist: Berta Ambrož
- Songwriters: Mojmir Sepe; Elza Budau

Placement
- Final result: 7th, 9 points

Participation chronology

Yugoslavia was represented at the Eurovision Song Contest 1966 with the song "Brez besed", composed by Mojmir Sepe, with lyrics by Elza Budau, and performed by Berta Ambrož. The Yugoslav participating broadcaster, Jugoslavenska radiotelevizija (JRT), selected its entry through Jugovizija 1966. This was the first-ever entry performed in Slovene in the Eurovision Song Contest.

== Before Eurovision ==
=== Jugovizija 1966 ===
The Yugoslav national final to select their entry, was held on 23 January at the Dom Sindikata in Belgrade. The host was Mića Orlović. There were 14 songs in the final, from the six subnational public broadcasters; RTV Ljubljana, RTV Zagreb, RTV Belgrade, RTV Sarajevo, RTV Skopje and RTV Titograd. The winner was chosen by the votes of an eight-member jury of experts, one juror for each of the six republics and the two autonomous provinces. The winning entry was "Brez besed" performed by Slovene singer Berta Ambrož, composed by Mojmir Sepe and written by Elza Budau. The composer was awarded 250 million dinars. Vice Vukov had represented Yugoslavia in 1963 and 1965.

Final – 23 January 1966 (Note: The running order and results are unknown)
Broadcaster	Artist	Song	Result
(Socialist Republic of Croatia) RTV Zagreb	Berta Ambrož	"Sanjala sam"	—N/a
(Socialist Republic of Slovenia) RTV Ljubljana	Berta Ambrož	"Brez besed"	1
(Socialist Republic of Bosnia and Herzegovina) RTV Sarajevo	Dragan Stojnić	"Duga je noć"	—N/a
(Socialist Republic of Bosnia and Herzegovina) RTV Sarajevo	Dragan Stojnić	"Dva novčića"	—N/a
(Socialist Republic of Bosnia and Herzegovina) RTV Sarajevo	Dragan Stojnić	"Priča"	—N/a
(Socialist Republic of Serbia) RTV Belgrade	Đorđe Marjanović	"Najlepši dan"	—N/a
(Socialist Republic of Slovenia) RTV Ljubljana	Elda Viler	"Ko si z menoj"	—N/a
(Socialist Republic of Croatia) RTV Zagreb	Gabi Novak	"Prvo pismo"	—N/a
(Socialist Republic of Serbia) RTV Belgrade	Lado Leskovar	"Tvoj osmeh"	—N/a
(Socialist Republic of Macedonia) RTV Skopje	Nina Spirova	"Devojka i pesna"	—N/a
(Socialist Republic of Montenegro) RTV Titograd	Slobodan Ristelić	"Izgubljeni koraci"	—N/a
(Socialist Republic of Montenegro) RTV Titograd	Slobodan Ristelić	"Ti si tu"	—N/a
(Socialist Republic of Macedonia) RTV Skopje	Vice Vukov	"Od ova nebo ti zede del"	—N/a
(Socialist Republic of Croatia) RTV Zagreb	Zdenka Vučković	"Rezervirano za ljubav"	—N/a

== At Eurovision ==
The contest was broadcast on Televizija Beograd, Televizija Zagreb, and Televizija Ljubljana.

Berta Ambrož performed 5th on the night of the Contest following Luxembourg and preceding Norway. At the close of the voting the song had received 9 points, coming 7th in the field of 18 competing countries.

=== Voting ===
Points awarded to Yugoslavia
Score	Country
5 points	United Kingdom
3 points	Germany
1 point	Finland

Points awarded by Yugoslavia
Score	Country
5 points	Austria
3 points	Ireland
1 point	Spain
