= Villa Louvigny =

Building in Luxembourg City, Luxembourg

Coordinates: 49°36′41″N 06°07′21″E

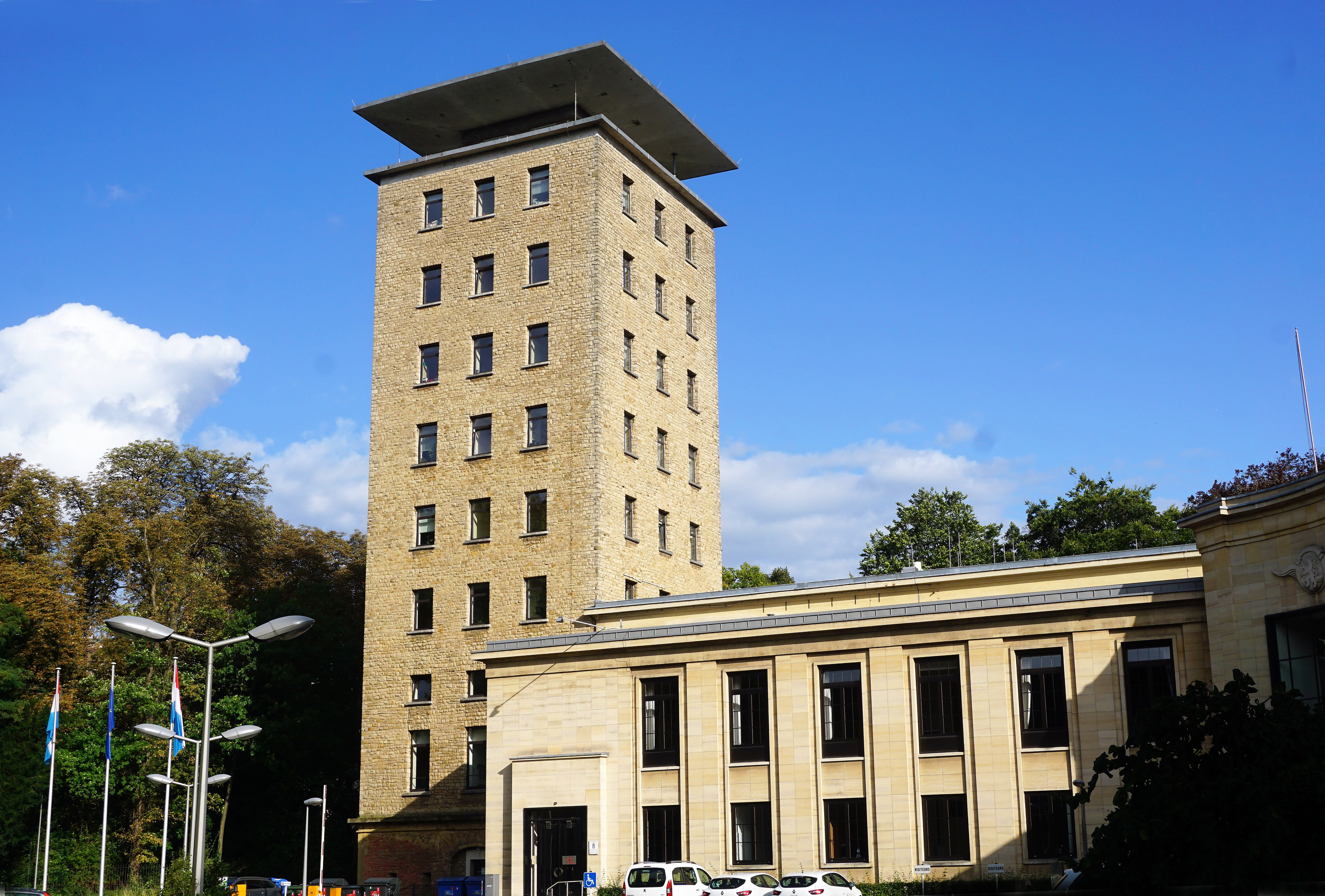
- Villa Louvigny (2017)

General information
- Location: All. Marconi, 1840 Ville-Haute, Luxembourg City, Luxembourg

Design and construction
- Architects: Pierre Reuter; Nicolas Schmit-Noesen; Hubert Schumacher; Pierre Schaack

Villa Louvigny is a building in Luxembourg City, in southern Luxembourg, that served as the headquarters of Compagnie Luxembourgeoise de Télédiffusion, the forerunner of RTL Group. It is located in the Municipal Park, in the Ville Haute district of the city.

== History ==
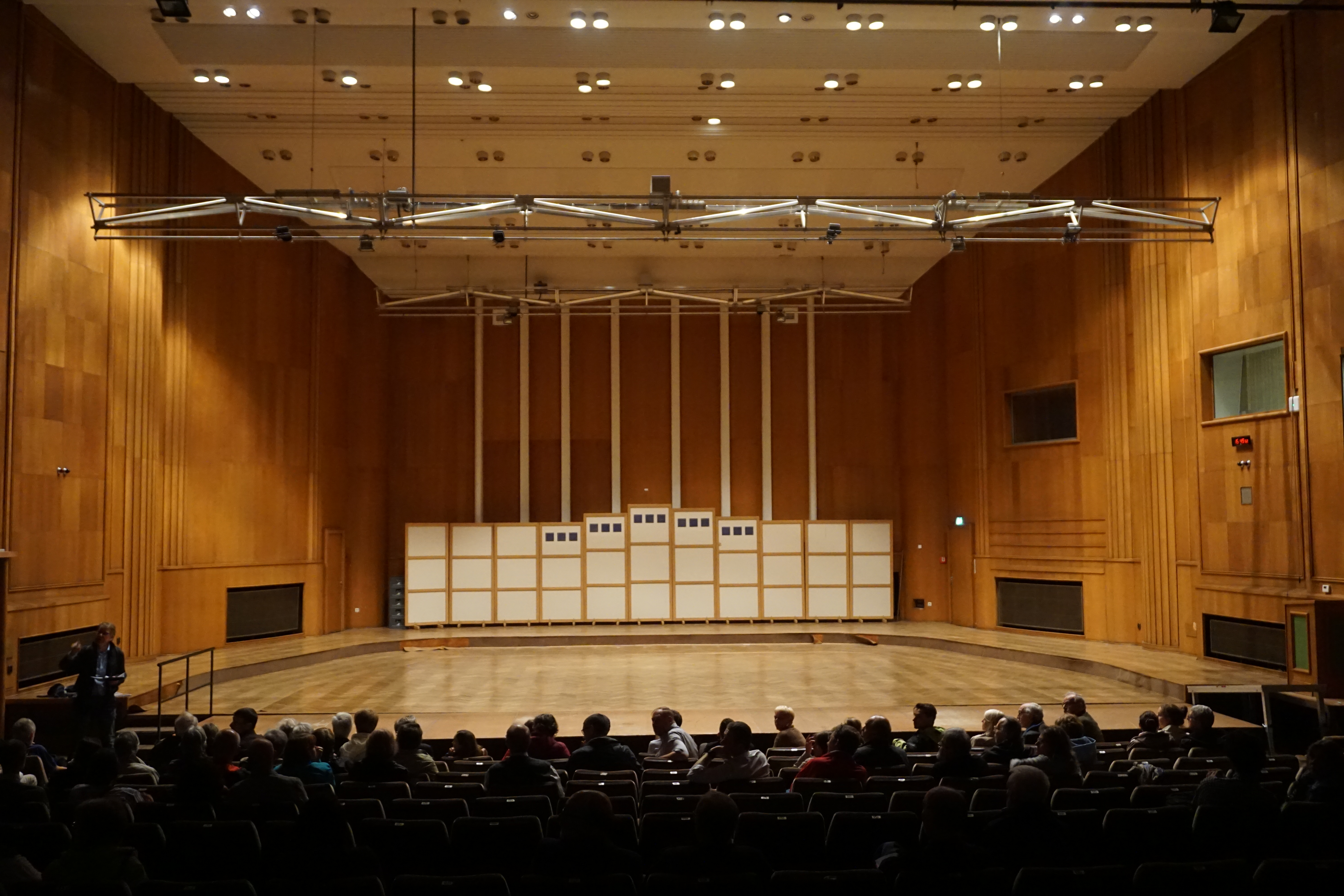
The Villa Louvigny auditorium

Built in 1920 on a site that before had been the Louvigny fort of the old fortress of Luxembourg, it was named after Jean Charles de Landas, Count of Louvigny, who was chief engineer and interim governor of the fortress in the 1670s.

The building was rented to the Compagnie Luxembourgeoise de Télédiffusion, who eventually bought the building in 1936. In 1991, the administrative offices moved to a new building on the Kirchberg plateau, followed by the technical installations in 1996. The Luxembourg Philharmonic Orchestra remained in the facilities until 2005 when the Philharmonie Luxembourg building was finished.

Villa Louvigny has hosted the Eurovision Song Contest twice, in 1962 and 1966.

Since 2000, the Villa Louvigny has been the main seat of the Ministry of Health.

== See also ==
- Radio Luxembourg

Preceded by Palais des Festivals; Cannes	Eurovision Song Contest; Venue; 1962	Succeeded by BBC Television Centre; London
Preceded by Sala di Concerto della RAI; Naples	Eurovision Song Contest; Venue; 1966	Succeeded by Hofburg Imperial Palace; Vienna
