= Eurovision Song Contest 1968 =

International song competition

Coordinates: 51°30′03.40″N 00°10′38.77″W

Date and venue
- Final: 6 April 1968
- Venue: Royal Albert Hall; London, United Kingdom

Organisation
- Organiser: European Broadcasting Union (EBU)
- Scrutineer: Clifford Brown

Production
- Host broadcaster: British Broadcasting Corporation (BBC)
- Director: Stewart Morris
- Executive producer: Tom Sloan
- Musical director: Norrie Paramor
- Presenter: Katie Boyle

Participants
- Number of entries: 17
- Participation map: Competing countries Countries that participated in the past but not in 1968

Vote
- Voting system: Ten-member juries in each country; each member gave one vote to their favourite song
- Winning song: Spain "La La La"

The Eurovision Song Contest 1968 was the 13th edition of the Eurovision Song Contest, held on 6 April 1968 at the Royal Albert Hall in London, United Kingdom, and presented by Katie Boyle. It was organised by the European Broadcasting Union (EBU) and host broadcaster the British Broadcasting Corporation (BBC), who staged the event after winning the 1967 contest for the United Kingdom with the song "Puppet on a String" by Sandie Shaw. Despite being the UK's first win at the contest, it was actually the third time that the BBC had hosted the competition, having previously done so in 1960 and 1963, both of which also took place in London and were presented by Katie Boyle. It was the first time the event was broadcast in colour.

Broadcasters from seventeen countries participated in the contest, the same countries that had participated the previous year.

The winner was Spain with the song "La La La", written by Manuel de la Calva and Ramón Arcusa, and performed by Massiel. This was Spain's first victory, and first ever top five placing, in the contest; their win over runners-up United Kingdom by a single point marked the closest finish in the contest up to that point. France, Ireland and Sweden rounded out the top five.

== Location ==
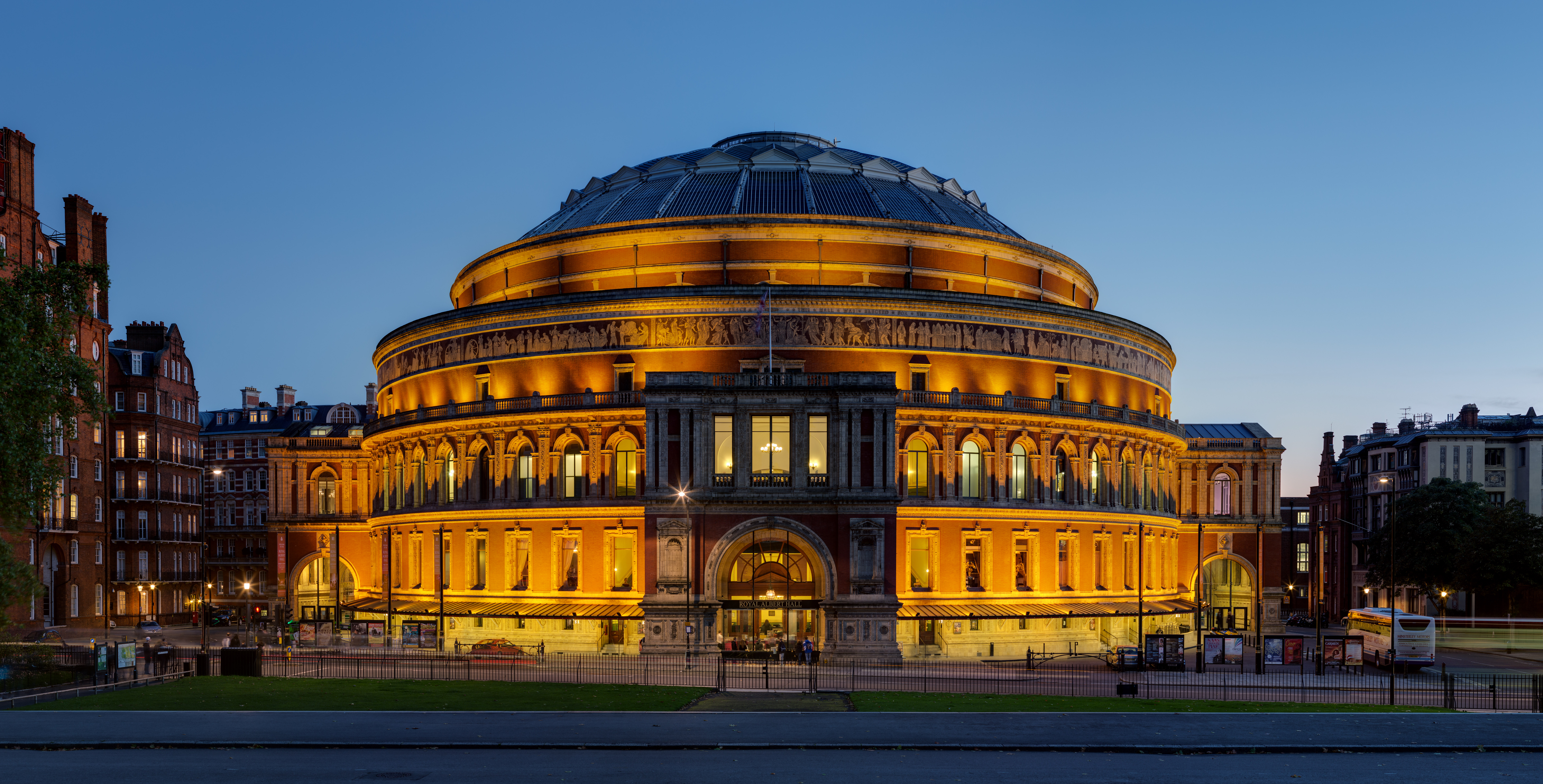
Royal Albert Hall, London - host venue of the 1968 contest.

The British Broadcasting Corporation (BBC) staged the 1968 contest in London, after winning the 1967 contest for the United Kingdom with the song "Puppet on a String" by Sandie Shaw. The venue selected was the Royal Albert Hall. This concert hall is known for hosting the world's leading artists from several performance genres, sports, award ceremonies, the annual summer Proms concerts and other events since its opening in 1871, and has become one of the United Kingdom's most treasured and distinctive buildings. At the time of the contest in 1968, the venue had a capacity of 7,000 seats.

== Participants ==
Eurovision Song Contest 1968 – Participation summaries by country
- Austria; Belgium; Finland; France; Germany; Ireland; Italy; Luxembourg; Monaco; Netherlands; Norway; Portugal; Spain; Sweden; Switzerland; United Kingdom; Yugoslavia

Broadcasters from seventeen countries participated in the 1968 contest, the same countries that had participated in 1967.

The contest featured one representative who had previously performed as lead artists for the same country. Isabelle Aubret had won Eurovision for France in 1962.

Originally Spanish broadcaster Televisión Española (TVE) entered Joan Manuel Serrat to sing "La La La", but after he demanded to sing the song in Catalan at the contest, Massiel, who was on tour in Mexico, was brought in as a late replacement. In just two weeks, she had to rush back to Spain, learn the song, record it in several languages, travel to Paris to get a dress and go to London for rehearsals. She sang the song in the contest in Spanish with a new arrangement made to fit her. In her winning reprise, she performed part of her song in English, in addition to the original version, becoming the first winner to do so. The Norwegian national selection, Melodi Grand Prix 1968, ended with the song "Jeg har aldri vært så glad i noen som deg" winning performed by both Kirsti Sparboe and Odd Børre. However the composer, Kari Diesen withdrew the song due to receiving multiple accusations of plagiarism of the song "Summer Holiday" by Cliff Richard. Norsk rikskringkasting (NRK) internally selected the runner-up song in the selection, "Stress" to participate in the contest instead, and Odd Børre was chosen as the singer.

Eurovision Song Contest 1968 participants
Country	Broadcaster	Artist	Song	Language	Songwriter(s)	Conductor
Austria	ORF	Karel Gott	"Tausend Fenster"	German	Walter Brandin; Udo Jürgens	Robert Opratko
Belgium	RTB	Claude Lombard	"Quand tu reviendras"	French	Roland Dero; Jo Van Wetter	Henri Segers
Finland	YLE	Kristina Hautala	"Kun kello käy"	Finnish	Esko Linnavalli; Juha Vainio	Ossi Runne
France	ORTF	Isabelle Aubret	"La Source"	French	Guy Bonnet; Henri Dijan; Daniël Faure	Alain Goraguer
Germany	HR (Note: On behalf of the German public broadcasting consortium ARD)	Wencke Myhre	"Ein Hoch der Liebe"	German	Horst Jankowski; Carl J. Schäuble	Horst Jankowski
Ireland	RTÉ	Pat McGeegan	"Chance of a Lifetime"	English	John Kennedy	Noel Kelehan
Italy	RAI	Sergio Endrigo	"Marianne"	Italian	Sergio Endrigo	Giancarlo Chiaramello
Luxembourg	CLT	Chris Baldo and Sophie Garel	"Nous vivrons d'amour"	French	Jacques Demarny; Carlos Leresche	André Borly
Monaco	TMC	Line and Willy	"À chacun sa chanson"	French	Jean-Claude Olivier; Roland Valade	Michel Colombier
Netherlands	NTS	Ronnie Tober	"Morgen"	Dutch	Joop Stokkermans; Theo Strengers	Dolf van der Linden
Norway	NRK	Odd Børre	"Stress"	Norwegian	Tor Hultin; Ola B. Johannessen	Øivind Bergh
Portugal	RTP	Carlos Mendes	"Verão"	Portuguese	José Alberto Diogo; Pedro Osório	Joaquim Luís Gomes
Spain	TVE	Massiel	"La La La"	Spanish	Ramón Arcusa; Manuel de la Calva	Rafael Ibarbia
Sweden	SR	Claes-Göran Hederström	"Det börjar verka kärlek, banne mej"	Swedish	Peter Himmelstrand	Mats Olsson
Switzerland	SRG SSR	Gianni Mascolo	"Guardando il sole"	Italian	Sanzio Chiesa; Aldo D'Addario	Mario Robbiani
United Kingdom	BBC	Cliff Richard	"Congratulations"	English	Phil Coulter; Bill Martin	Norrie Paramor
Yugoslavia	JRT	Lući Kapurso and Hamo Hajdarhodžić	"Jedan dan" (Један дан)	Serbo-Croatian	Đelo Jusić; Stipica Kalogjera; Stijepo Stražičić	Miljenko Prohaska

== Format ==
This was the first Eurovision Song Contest produced and broadcast in colour. The countries in which it was broadcast in colour were France, Germany, the Netherlands, Norway, Switzerland, Sweden, and the United Kingdom. (Note: In the UK the contest was broadcast live in black and white on BBC One, then repeated in colour on BBC Two the next day.) In other countries, the competition was still only broadcast in black and white because their television networks were not yet equipped for colour. Despite this, national juries in countries such as Spain were able to watch it in colour directly from the Eurovision network signal, which was already reaching its broadcaster's studios.

== Contest overview ==
Prior to the contest, the bookmakers were sure of another British victory, as the English singer Cliff Richard, who was already dominating the music charts at that time, was hotly tipped as the favourite to win, but in the end he lost out to Spain's song by a margin of just one vote. This was the closest finish in any contest up to this point and would remain so until twenty years later.

Results of the Eurovision Song Contest 1968
R/O	Country	Artist	Song	Votes	Place
1	Portugal	Carlos Mendes	"Verão"	5	11
2	Netherlands	Ronnie Tober	"Morgen"	1	16
3	Belgium	Claude Lombard	"Quand tu reviendras"	8	7
4	Austria	Karel Gott	"Tausend Fenster"	2	13
5	Luxembourg	Chris Baldo and Sophie Garel	"Nous vivrons d'amour"	5	11
6	Switzerland	Gianni Mascolo	"Guardando il sole"	2	13
7	Monaco	Line and Willy	"À chacun sa chanson"	8	7
8	Sweden	Claes-Göran Hederström	"Det börjar verka kärlek, banne mej"	15	5
9	Finland	Kristina Hautala	"Kun kello käy"	1	16
10	France	Isabelle Aubret	"La Source"	20	3
11	Italy	Sergio Endrigo	"Marianne"	7	10
12	United Kingdom	Cliff Richard	"Congratulations"	28	2
13	Norway	Odd Børre	"Stress"	2	13
14	Ireland	Pat McGeegan	"Chance of a Lifetime"	18	4
15	Spain	Massiel	"La La La"	29	1
16	Germany	Wencke Myhre	"Ein Hoch der Liebe"	11	6
17	Yugoslavia	Lući Kapurso and Hamo Hajdarhodžić	"Jedan dan"	8	7

=== Spokespersons ===
Each participating broadcaster appointed a spokesperson who was responsible for announcing the votes for its respective country via telephone. Known spokespersons at the 1968 contest are listed below.

- Finland – Poppe Berg
- Ireland – Gay Byrne
- Sweden – Edvard Matz
- Spain – Ramón Rivera
- United Kingdom – Michael Aspel

== Detailed voting results ==
Every participating broadcaster assembled a jury panel of ten people. Every jury member could give one vote to his or her favourite song, except that representing their own country. This means that any song could receive a maximum of 10 votes from a national jury, but none achieved this. The highest number of votes a song received from a jury was six, received by the songs of Spain, Ireland, Sweden, and France.

Due to a misunderstanding by the hostess, Katie Boyle, Switzerland was erroneously awarded 3 votes by Yugoslavia, instead of 2. The scrutineer asked for the Yugoslav votes to be announced a second time.

Detailed voting results
		Total score	Portugal	Netherlands	Belgium	Austria	Luxembourg	Switzerland	Monaco	Sweden	Finland	France	Italy	United Kingdom	Norway	Ireland	Spain	Germany	Yugoslavia
Contestants	Portugal	5													2		3		
Contestants	Netherlands	1											1						
Contestants	Belgium	8	1								1	1	3	1			1		
Contestants	Austria	2																2	
Contestants	Luxembourg	5		1		1			1			1		1					
Contestants	Switzerland	2																	2
Contestants	Monaco	8		2			1				3			1		1			
Contestants	Sweden	15	1	1							1			2	6	4			
Contestants	Finland	1													1				
Contestants	France	20		3	6	2	3	3		1			2						
Contestants	Italy	7	1					2									2		2
Contestants	United Kingdom	28	1	2	2		1	4	5	3	2	4	1			1		2	
Contestants	Norway	2					1										1		
Contestants	Ireland	18	1	1	1	4	1			4									6
Contestants	Spain	29	4			2	1		4		3	4	3		1	1		6	
Contestants	Germany	11					1	1		2				5			2		
Contestants	Yugoslavia	8	1		1	1	1									3	1		

== Broadcasts ==
Each participating broadcaster was required to relay the contest via its networks. Non-participating EBU member broadcasters were also able to relay the contest as "passive participants". Broadcasters were able to send commentators to provide coverage of the contest in their own native language and to relay information about the artists and songs to their television viewers. In addition to the participating countries, the contest was also reportedly broadcast in Tunisia, and in Bulgaria, Czechoslovakia, East Germany, Hungary, Poland, Romania and the Soviet Union via Intervision, with an estimated global audience of between 150 and 200 million.

Known details on the broadcasts in each country, including the specific broadcasting stations and commentators are shown in the tables below.

Broadcasters and commentators in participating countries
Country	Broadcaster	Channel(s)	Commentator(s)	Ref(s)
Austria	ORF	FS1		
Belgium	RTB	RTB	Paule Herreman	
Belgium	RTB	RTB 1		
Belgium	BRT	BRT	Herman Verelst	
Finland	YLE	TV-ohjelma 1	Aarno Walli	
Finland	YLE	Ruotsinkielinen ulaohjelma		
France	ORTF	Deuxième Chaîne	Pierre Tchernia	
France	ORTF	France Inter		
Germany	ARD	Deutsches Fernsehen		
Ireland	RTÉ	RTÉ	Brendan O'Reilly	
Ireland	RTÉ	RTÉ Radio	Kevin Roche	
Italy	RAI	Secondo Programma TV	Renato Tagliani	
Luxembourg	CLT	Télé-Luxembourg		
Netherlands	NTS	Nederland 1	Elles Berger	
Norway	NRK	NRK Fjernsynet, NRK (Note: Deferred broadcast on NRK at 22:30 (CET))	Roald Øyen	
Portugal	RTP	RTP		
Spain	TVE	TVE 1, TVE Canarias (Note: Deferred broadcast on TVE Canarias the following day at 22:35 (WET))	Federico Gallo	
Spain	RNE	Radio Peninsular de Barcelona	José María Íñigo	
Sweden	SR	Sveriges TV	Christina Hansegård	
Switzerland	SRG SSR	TV DRS	Theodor Haller	
Switzerland	SRG SSR	TSR	Georges Hardy	
Switzerland	SRG SSR	TSI		
Switzerland	SRG SSR	Radio Beromünster (Note: Delayed broadcast on 8 April at 22:30 (CET))	Albert Werner	
United Kingdom	BBC	BBC1 (Note: Re-broadcast in colour on BBC2 the following day at 16:30 (BST))	No commentator	
United Kingdom	BBC	BBC Radio 1, BBC Radio 2	Pete Murray	
United Kingdom	BFBS	BFBS Radio	Thurston Holland	
Yugoslavia	JRT	Televizija Beograd		
Yugoslavia	JRT	Televizija Ljubljana		
Yugoslavia	JRT	Televizija Zagreb		

Broadcasters and commentators in non-participating countries
Country	Broadcaster	Channel(s)	Commentator(s)	Ref(s)
Czechoslovakia	ČST	ČST	Miroslav Horníček	
Hungary	MTV	MTV	András Kalmár	
Malta	MBA	MTS, National Network		
Poland	TP	Telewizja Polska		
Puerto Rico	WKAQ (Note: Delayed broadcast on 30 April 1968 at 20:30 (AST))			
Romania	TVR	TVR		
