= Kristina Hautala =

Swedish-Finnish singer (born 1948)

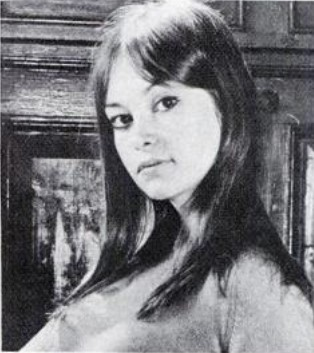

Background information
- Born: 28 June 1948 (age 77); Stockholm, Sweden
- Instrument: Vocals
- Years active: 1966–1972; 2003

Kristina Hautala (born 28 June 1948) is a Swedish-Finnish former singer who rose to success in Finland in the late 1960s.

== Early career ==
Born in Stockholm of Finnish descent, Hautala was still living in her native city when she made her recording debut with "En koskaan", a Finnish rendering of "You Don't Have to Say You Love Me", recorded 24 May 1966. Entering the Finnish Top Ten in November 1966, "En koskaan" spent 11 weeks there, peaking at #6. Hautala resultantly became an in-demand television and live performer in Finland: she toured nationally in the summer of 1967 with Johnny and that autumn and winter she headlined with Lasse Mårtenson in a two-month engagement that set a new box-office record for the Café Adlon, Helsinki's premier entertainment venue. Hautala continued her recording career with 11 singles released by 1969, her recording output typified by Finnish covers of English-language recordings such as "Rakkautta vain" (The Beatles' "All You Need is Love") and covers of international hits such as "Voinko luottaa", whose original, "Io ti darò di più" was an Italian hit for Ornella Vanoni.

== Eurovision 1968 ==
On 10 February 1968, Hautala appeared in the televised Finnish preliminary round for the Eurovision Song Contest as one of six singers competing to represent Finland at Eurovision 1968. 1968 marked the first time the Eurovision entry for Finland, a contender since 1961, was selected by the votes of the television viewing audience who were asked to mail in ballots: the result, announced 17 February 1968, was that Kristina Hautala's number, "Kun kello käy", was the top vote-getter and would be Finland's entrant at Eurovision 1968 held 6 April 1968 at the Royal Albert Hall in London.

Hautala's performance on the competition night drew a single vote with a resultant finish ranked 16th of 17, tied for last place with the Netherlands' entrant "Morgen" by Ronnie Tober. While two of Finland's prior Eurovision bids had received zero points, in neither instance had the relevant song been viewed as a real contender: "Kun kello käy"'s poor showing at Eurovision 1968 consolidated the long-standing perception of that nation's Eurovision participation being risible.

"Kun kello käy" was a chart disappointment for Hautala in Finland, failing to reach the Top Ten there although it did reach #12: an attempt was made to bolster the song's popularity by having Hautala cut a Swedish version, "Vänta och se" whose lyrics were written by Stig Anderson.

== Later life ==
In 1970 Hautala left her longtime label Scandia and debuted on EMI-Columbia with "Kop kop, ken lie?", a Finnish cover of "Knock, Knock Who's There?", which proved to be her last evident release as a career recording artist. In 1972 she returned to her native Stockholm to attend university, subsequently working as a psychologist and art therapist. She making a one-off return to singing in 2003 with the album Hetki tää, a collaboration with the Matti Viita-aho Group.

== Singles discography ==
Year of release	catalog#/ Tracks	Songwriting credit (l=lyrics m=music)	Details includes date of recording if known
1966	Scandia KS 650; A "En Koskaan"; B "Divarin helmi"	A Juha Vainio (l); Pino Donaggio (m); B Kari Tuomisaari (l); J F Hanley (m)	A/B 24 May 1966; A cover of "You Don't Have to Say You Love Me" by Dusty Springfield; B cover of "Second Hand Rose" by Barbra Streisand
1967	Scandia KS 678; A "Jokainen hetki" B "Sä oot vain työtä räätälin"	A Juha Vainio (l); Clive Westlake (m); B Juha Vainio (l); Victor Young (m)	A 12 December 1966; A cover of "All I See is You" by Dusty Springfield; B cover of "Sam, You Made the Pants Too Long" by Barbra Streisand
1967	Scandia KS 691; A "Raudanluja"; B "Voinko luottaa"	B Raul Reiman (l); Memo Remigi (m)	A 22 February 1967 B 1 March 1967; B cover of "Io ti darò di più" by Ornella Vanoni an English language hit for the Bachelors as "Can I Trust You"
1967	Scandia KS 708; A "Rakkautta vain" B "Sain sulta sanan"	A Pertti Reponen (l); Lennon/McCartney (m); B Juha Vainio (l); Georges Liferman (m)	A 23 August 1967; A cover of "All You Need is Love" by The Beatles; B 1962 original "Et C'Est Bien Mieux Comme Ca" by Les Chaussettes Noires was remade in 1966 by Liz Brady
1967	Scandia KS 722; A "Kuinkas hurisee?" B "En katso naamion taa"	A Saukki (l); John Pisano (m); B Pertti Reponen (l); Chico Buarque (m)	A 7 November 1967 B 18 October 1967; A introduced as "So What's New?" by Peggy Lee in 1967; B introduced as "A banda" by Nara Leão in 1966
1967	Scandia 730; A "Entinen jää" B "Kenen syy, kenen syy?"	A Bernard Gérard; Michel Delancray; Mya Simille; B Tony Hatch	A 16 June 1967 B 31 December 1966; A introduced as "Partie de dames" by Liz Brady in 1966; B cover of "Love Is Me, Love Is You" by Connie Francis
1968	Scandia KS 739; A "Tienristeyksessä"; B "Näen silmistäsi sen?"	A/B Saukki (l); Leslie Bricusse (m)	A 31 January 1968 B 13 February 1968; A introduced on the soundtrack of Doctor Dolittle as "At the Crossroads"; B introduced on the soundtrack of Doctor Dolittle as "When I Look in Your Eyes"
1968	Scandia KS 742; A "Kun kello käy" B "Kielletyt käskyt"	A Juha Vainio (l); Esko Linnavalli (m); B Jukka Virtanen (l); Lasse Mårtenson (m)	A 21 February 1968; A Eurovision 1968 entrant for Finland – finished 16th
1968	Scandia KS 762; A "Kysyn vaan" B "Muistot vain jää"	A Pertti Reponen (l); Tony Hazzard (m); B Pertti Reponen (l); Mark London (m)	A cover of "Me, the Peaceful Heart" by Lulu cover of "Best of Both Worlds" by Lulu
1968	Polar POS 1053; A "Vänta och se" B "Svart på vitt"	A Stig Anderson (l); Esko Linavalli (m); B Bengt Haslum (l); Lasse Mårtenson (m)	A/B Swedish language remakes of tracks released on Scandia KS 742
1969	Scandia KS 794 [A "Judy – Ystäväni"] B "Oi Oi Oi"	B Pertti Reponen (l); Arne Bendiksen (m)	[A recording by Johnny does not feature Kristina Hautala] B 2 April 1969; B cover of "Oj, oj, oj, så glad jeg skal bli" by Kirsti Sparboe
1970	EMI-Columbia 5E006-34135; A "Vain hän " B "Kop kop, ken lie?"	A Kristina Hautala (l); Peter Moesser (m); B Reino Bäckman (l); John Carter (m)	A/B arranged and conducted by Seppo Paakkunainen; A introduced by Katja Ebstein as "Ich Will Ihn" in 1970; B cover of "Knock, Knock Who's There?" by Mary Hopkin
Unless otherwise indicated all tracks are tracks arranged and conducted by Esko Linnavalli and feature his orchestra

Preceded by Fredi with Varjoon - suojaan	Finland in the Eurovision Song Contest; 1968	Succeeded by Jarkko & Laura with Kuin silloin ennen
