= Norway in the Eurovision Song Contest 1968 =

- Eurovision Song Contest 1968
- Participating broadcaster: Norsk rikskringkasting (NRK)
- Country: Norway
- Selection process: Internal selection among Melodi Grand Prix 1968 entries
- Selection date: 7 March 1968

Competing entry
- Song: "Stress"
- Artist: Odd Børre
- Songwriters: Tor Hultin; Ola B. Johannessen

Placement
- Final result: 13th, 2 points

Participation chronology

Norway was represented at the Eurovision Song Contest 1968 with the song "Stress", composed by Tor Hultin, with lyrics by Ola B. Johannessen, and performed by Odd Børre. The Norwegian participating broadcaster, Norsk rikskringkasting (NRK), organised the national final Melodi Grand Prix 1968 to select its entry for the contest. The national final was won by the song "Jeg har aldri vært så glad i noen som deg," performed by Kirsti Sparboe and Odd Børre, but when the song's composer withdrew, NRK internally selected the runner-up as its entry for the contest.

== Before Eurovision ==
=== Melodi Grand Prix 1968 ===
Norsk rikskringkasting (NRK) held the Melodi Grand Prix 1968 on 3 March 1968 at its studios in Oslo, hosted by Jan Voigt.

Five performers and songs took part in the final, with each song sung twice by different singers, once with a small combo and once with a full orchestra. The winning song was chosen by voting from ten regional juries. The winning song was "Jeg har aldri vært så glad i noen som deg" performed by both Kirsti Sparboe and Odd Børre.

Winner

MGP – 3 March 1968
R/O	Artist		Song	Points	Place
R/O	Combo	Orchestra	Song	Points	Place
1	Per Asplin	Nora Brockstedt	"Nysgjerrig-Per"	4	4
2	Kirsti Sparboe	Odd Børre	"Stress"	14	2
3	Nora Brockstedt	Per Müller	"Nordlys"	10	3
4	Kirsti Sparboe	Odd Børre	"Jeg har aldri vært så glad i noen som deg"	20	1
5	Per Müller	Per Asplin	"Ingenmannsland"	2	5

=== Internal selection ===
On 7 March, four days after Melodi Grand Prix was held, "Jeg har aldri vært så glad i noen som deg" was withdrawn by its composer Kari Diesen amid persistent allegations that it plagiarised the 1963 hit "Summer Holiday" by Cliff Richard (who would go on to represent the United Kingdom at the contest), which prompted NRK to instead select the runner-up, "Stress", as its entry for Eurovision. Odd Børre was also internally selected as the performer.

== At Eurovision ==
On the evening of the contest, Børre performed 13th in the running order, following the United Kingdom and preceding Ireland. Each national jury had 10 points to distribute between the songs, and at the close, "Stress" had picked up 2 points (1 each from Luxembourg and Spain), placing Norway joint 13th (with Austria and Switzerland) out of 17 entries. The Norwegian jury awarded 6 of its 10 points to Sweden.

The conductor of the Norwegian entry was Øivind Bergh.

=== Voting ===
Points awarded to Norway
Score	Country
1 point	Luxembourg; Spain

Points awarded by Norway
Score	Country
6 points	Sweden
2 points	Portugal
1 point	Finland; Spain
