= Spain in the Eurovision Song Contest 1968 =

- Eurovision Song Contest 1968
- Participating broadcaster: Televisión Española (TVE)
- Country: Spain
- Selection process: Internal selection
- Announcement date: Song: 10 March 1968; Artist: 25 March 1968

Competing entry
- Song: "La, la, la"
- Artist: Massiel
- Songwriters: Manuel de la Calva; Ramón Arcusa

Placement
- Final result: 1st, 29 points

Participation chronology

Spain was represented at the Eurovision Song Contest 1968 with the song "La, la, la", written by Manuel de la Calva and Ramón Arcusa of Dúo Dinámico, and performed by Massiel. The Spanish participating broadcaster, Televisión Española (TVE), internally selected its entry for the contest. The song eventually won the competition, becoming the first song from Spain to achieve this.

Massiel was not the song's original performer as the initial Spanish representative Joan Manuel Serrat was removed after recording, releasing, and promoting the entry for his demand to sing it in Catalan in the contest.

== Before Eurovision ==
In late 1967, Televisión Española (TVE) contacted several record labels requesting original songs to participate in the 13th edition of the Eurovision Song Contest to be held in London. Zafiro-Novola sent them a tape with three songs: "Nos falta fe" by Juan y Junior, "Tirititero" by Joan Manuel Serrat, and "La, la, la" by Dúo Dinámico. The broadcaster internally selected "La, la, la" but preferred Serrat as performer. On 15 January 1968, Serrat was asked to go to Prado del Rey to be informed, after which he accepted to sing "La, la, la" written by Manuel de la Calva and Ramón Arcusa at the contest. His appointment was made public that same day. He recorded the Spanish-language version of the song, arranged by Bert Kaempfert and produced by Juan Carlos Calderón, at the Polydor Records studios in Hamburg. In addition, he recorded the song in Catalan (with lyrics by Serrat himself), English (with lyrics by Michael Julien), Portuguese, and Italian, and made a promotion tour throughout Europe.

On 8 March, TVE dedicated to Serrat a special program which showed him singing six of his songs, three in Catalan and three in Spanish, on video clips filmed for the occasion. (Note: The six songs were: "Cançó de matinada", "Palabras de amor", "El titiritero", "La gaviota", "Poemas de amor", and "Ahora que tengo veinte años".) On 10 March, on the evening edition of Telediario, the song "La, la, la" was aired for the first time.

Serrat was under pressure from a number of Catalanists who labeled him a traitor if he did not sing the entire song in Catalan (a language repressed under the Francoist dictatorship until shortly before). On 25 March, he demanded TVE in an open letter to sing the song in Catalan at the contest as he considering himself above all a Catalan singer, and that, in the event that this was not possible, required TVE to accept his irrevocable resignation. (Note: Singing the song in Catalan in the contest was unfeasible since Zafiro-Novola, which made all the financial contribution, would lose its investment because it had sold the rights of the Catalan version to another company. To please both parties, Serrat's agent had the idea of Serrat singing the song in Spanish but with a verse in Catalan. To pressure TVE to accept the introduction of the verse in Catalan, they issued this ultimatum. But TVE canceled Serrat's participation without even negotiating. Furthermore, the contest rules specified that the songs had to be performed in an official language of the country they represented, and the right for regional languages to become co-official was not achieved in Spain until the promulgation of the Constitution of 1978.) TVE released an answering press note denying any discrimination against Catalan in the network, considering Serrat's decision incorrect and unacceptable since he sought to give a political meaning to his participation, and removed him as their representative.

Therefore, Massiel, who was under contract with Zafiro-Novola and was on tour in Mexico, was brought in as a late replacement. She landed in Madrid on 26 March, where she recorded the Spanish-language version of the song as soon as she arrived, immediately after which she flew to Paris to record the French, English, and German versions. During her 36-hour stay in Paris she bought a Courrèges dress which she would wear to the contest. Before going to London for the contest rehearsals, she travel to several European cities for promotion, which included Belgrade and Zagreb in Yugoslavia.

== At Eurovision ==
On 6 April 1968, the Eurovision Song Contest was held at the Royal Albert Hall in London hosted by the British Broadcasting Corporation (BBC), and broadcast live throughout the continent. Massiel performed "La, la, la", the 15th song that evening, accompanied by Trío La La La (María Jesús Aguirre, María Dolores Arenas, and Mercedes Valimaña) as backing singers, following Ireland's "Chance of a Lifetime" by Pat McGeegan and preceding Germany's "Ein Hoch der Liebe" by Wencke Myhre. Rafael Ibarbia made the orchestral arrangement of the Spanish entry and conducted the event's orchestra in its performance.

At the close of voting, the song had received 29 points winning the competition, beating the favorite, the United Kingdom's "Congratulations" by Cliff Richard, by just a single point. Bill Martin (cowriter of the British entry) called the Spanish song "a piece of rubbish". In Spain, Massiel's triumph against the British was compared to that of Agustina de Aragón against the French Army. This triumph was the first of Spain's two Eurovision wins to date. In her winning reprise, Massiel performed part of the song in English, in addition to the original version, becoming the first winner to do so.

The contest was broadcast on TVE 1 and TVE Canarias, (Note: Deferred broadcast on TVE Canarias the following day at 22:35 WET) with commentary by Federico Gallo. It was also aired on Radio Peninsular de Barcelona with commentary by José María Íñigo. Before the event, TVE aired a talk show hosted by Jesús Álvarez introducing the Spanish jury from Prado del Rey, which continued after the contest commenting on the results. Although the contest was broadcast in Spain in black and white, since TVE was not yet ready to broadcast in colour, the jury was able to watch it in colour directly from the Eurovision network signal that reached the TVE studios.

=== Voting ===
TVE assembled a jury panel with ten members, with each member giving one vote to their favourite song. The following members comprised the Spanish jury:

- Pilar Miró – multicamera director at TVE
- Feliciano Rivilla – Atlético Madrid football player
- Natalia Figueroa – journalist
- Jesús María Arozamena – director of the Sociedad General de Autores de España
- Ana Maria Badell Lapetra – writer and illustrator of children's stories (chairperson)
- José María Forqué – film director
- María Rosa Zumárraga – contestant of Un millón para el mejor
- Juan Van-Halen Acedo – poet
- Mara Recatero – continuity supervisor
- Rafael Cano – Spanish decathlon champion

The secretary of the jury and the spokesperson who announced the Spanish votes was Ramón Rivera.

Points awarded to Spain
Score	Country
6 points	Germany
4 points	France; Monaco; Portugal
3 points	Finland; Italy
2 points	Austria
1 point	Ireland; Luxembourg; Norway

Points awarded by Spain
Score	Country
3 points	Portugal
2 points	Germany; Italy
1 point	Belgium; Norway; Yugoslavia

== After Eurovision ==
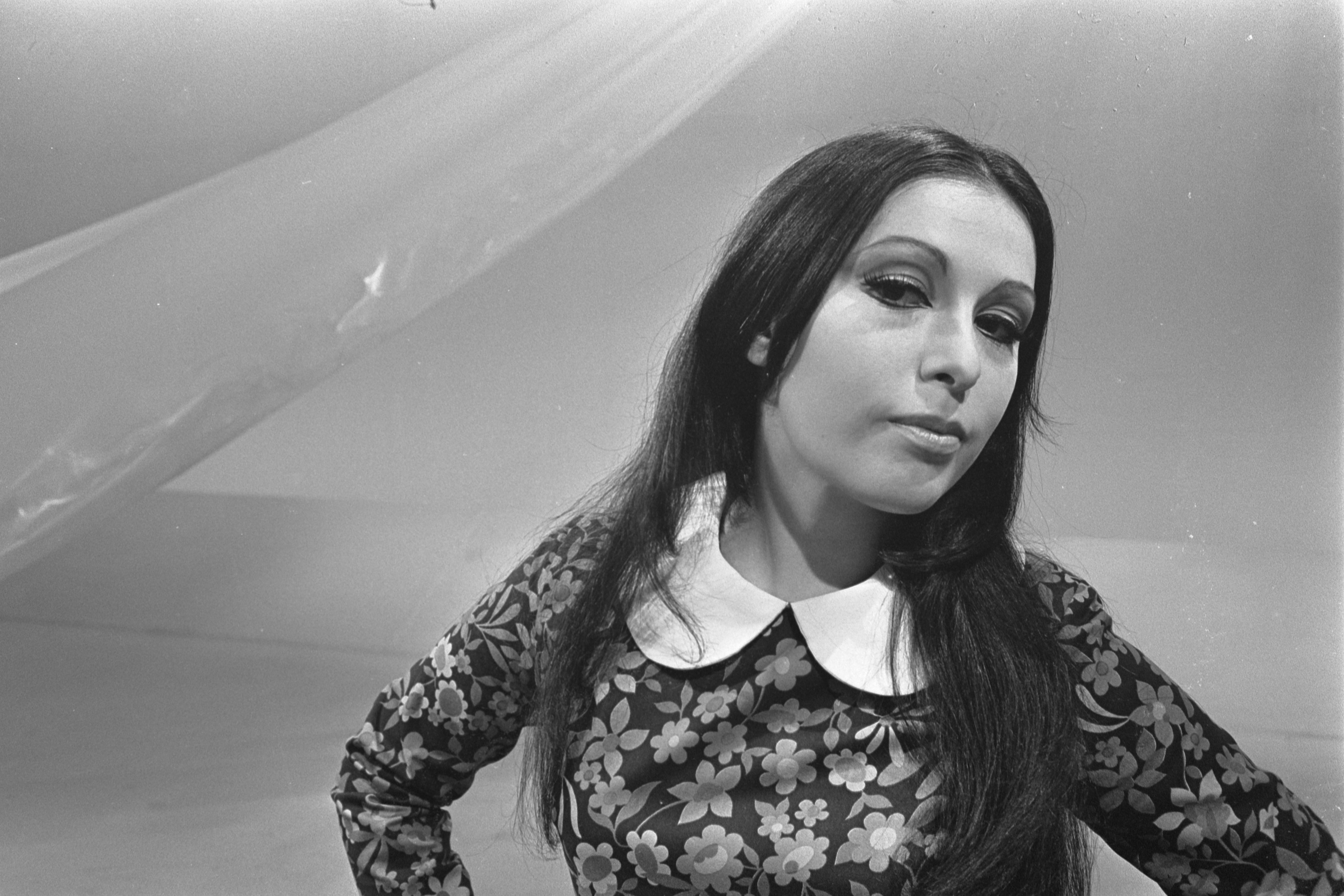
Massiel at the KRO studios in the Netherlands on 19 April 1968.

Immediately after the contest, Massiel went on tour to several European television and radio stations where she sang the song. It was not until 22 April that she arrived in Madrid, where a large crowd welcomed her at Madrid–Barajas Airport; after which she went to Prado del Rey, where she was received by the TVE workers with applause. There, she gave with the songwriters a crowded press conference at Studio 1, which was broadcast by TVE later that same day.

Zafiro-Novola held a gala dinner to honor Massiel and TVE, presided over by Manuel Fraga, the Minister of Information and Tourism on whom TVE depended at the time. The regime awarded her the Ribbon of Dame of the Order of Isabella the Catholic, but she refused to be decorated by Franco himself, so they sent it to her by mail.

All the events related to this participation were dramatized in the Movistar Plus+ television miniseries La canción, starring Carolina Yuste as Massiel and Marcel Borràs as Joan Manuel Serrat, which premiered on 8 May 2025. The Eurovision performances and rehearsals were recreated in a full-scale replica of the Eurovision stage at the Royal Albert Hall, which was built in a studio specifically for the filming.
