= Yugoslavia in the Eurovision Song Contest 1968 =

- Eurovision Song Contest 1968
- Participating broadcaster: Jugoslavenska radiotelevizija (JRT)
- Country: Yugoslavia
- Selection process: Jugovizija 1968
- Selection date: 25 February 1968

Competing entry
- Song: "Jedan dan"
- Artist: Luci Capurso and Hamo Hajdarhodžić
- Songwriters: Đelo Jusić; Stipica Kalogjera; Stijepo Stražičić

Placement
- Final result: 7th, 8 points

Participation chronology

Yugoslavia was represented at the Eurovision Song Contest 1968 with the song "Jedan dan", composed by Đelo Jusić and Stipica Kalogjera, with lyrics by Stijepo Stražičić, and performed by Luci Capurso and Hamo Hajdarhodžić. The Yugoslav participating broadcaster, Jugoslavenska radiotelevizija (JRT), selected its entry through Jugovizija 1968.

== Before Eurovision ==
=== Jugovizija 1968 ===
The Yugoslav national final to select their entry, was held on 25 February at the RTV Skopje studios in Skopje. There were six hosts in the contest; Vesna Nestorović, Kristina Remskar, Dubravka Ćećez, Snežana Lipkovska, Rosanda Kovijanić, and Helga Vlahović. There were 15 songs in the final, from six subnational public broadcasters of JRT. RTV Titograd made a comeback, after their first participation in 1963 Yugoslav finals. The winner was chosen by the votes of a mixed jury of experts and citizens, one juror from each of the subnational public broadcasters of JRT, and three non-experts - citizens. The winning song was "Jedan dan" performed by the Croatian group Dubrovački trubaduri, written by Stijepo Stražičić and composed by Đelo Jusić and Stipica Kalogjera. Lola Novaković represented Yugoslavia in 1962.

Final – 25 February 1968
R/O	Broadcaster	Artist	Song	Points	Place
1	(Socialist Republic of Serbia) RTV Belgrade	Đorđe Marjanović	"Ne verujem ti više"	3	6
2	(Socialist Republic of Serbia) RTV Belgrade	Radmila Mikić	"Važi"	1	10
3	(Socialist Republic of Serbia) RTV Belgrade	Lola Jovanović	"Pesnik mira"	3	6
4	(Socialist Republic of Croatia) RTV Zagreb	Dubrovački trubaduri	"Jedan dan"	36	1
5	(Socialist Republic of Croatia) RTV Zagreb	Zvonko Špišić	"Ne pričaj o ljubavi"	0	12
6	(Socialist Republic of Croatia) RTV Zagreb	Hrvoje Hegedušić	"Bilo je i bit će"	2	9
7	(Socialist Republic of Slovenia) RTV Ljubljana	Žarko Dančuo	"Balada o povratku"	0	12
8	(Socialist Republic of Slovenia) RTV Ljubljana	Elda Viler	"Če bi teden stel osem dni"	12	2
9	(Socialist Republic of Slovenia) RTV Ljubljana	Tatjana Gros	"Luči v oknih so se utrnile"	0	12
10	(Socialist Republic of Bosnia and Herzegovina) RTV Sarajevo	Kemal Monteno	"Kad se vratim kući"	10	3
11	(Socialist Republic of Bosnia and Herzegovina) RTV Sarajevo	Kemal Monteno	"Negdje"	5	4
12	(Socialist Republic of Montenegro) RTV Titograd	Vlado Mračević	"Odnesi kišni dan"	0	12
13	(Socialist Republic of Macedonia) RTV Skopje	Dime Popovski	"Znam den"	1	10
14	(Socialist Republic of Macedonia) RTV Skopje	Nina Spirova	"Elegija"	5	4
15	(Socialist Republic of Macedonia) RTV Skopje	Zoran Milosavljević	"I utre ke bide den"	3	6

== At Eurovision ==
The contest was broadcast on Televizija Beograd, Televizija Zagreb, and Televizija Ljubljana.

Because groups weren't allowed at the ESC, Dubrovački trubaduri had to perform under the name of two of its singers - Luci Capurso & Hamo Hajdarhodžić. Dubrovački trubaduri performed 17th (last) on the night of the Contest. At the close of the voting the song had received 8 points, coming 7th in the field of 17 competing countries.

=== Voting ===
Points awarded to Yugoslavia
Score	Country
3 points	Ireland
1 point	Austria; Belgium; Luxembourg; Portugal; Spain

Points awarded by Yugoslavia
Score	Country
6 points	Ireland
2 points	Italy; Switzerland
