= Congratulations (Cliff Richard song) =

1968 single by Cliff Richard

Single by Cliff Richard
- B-side: "High 'n' Dry" (Cook-Greenaway)
- Released: 15 March 1968
- Recorded: 3 February 1968
- Studio: EMI Studios, London
- Genre: Pop music; schlager
- Length: 2:33
- Label: Columbia DB8376
- Songwriters: Bill Martin; Phil Coulter
- Producer: Norrie Paramor

Cliff Richard singles chronology
"All My Love (Solo Tu)" (1967)	"Congratulations" (1968)	"I'll Love You Forever Today" (1968)

Eurovision Song Contest 1968 entry
- Country: United Kingdom
- Artist: Cliff Richard
- Language: English
- Composers: Bill Martin, Phil Coulter
- Lyricists: Bill Martin, Phil Coulter
- Conductor: Norrie Paramor

Finals performance
- Final result: 2nd
- Final points: 28

Entry chronology
- ◄ "Puppet on a String" (1967)
- "Boom Bang-a-Bang" (1969) ►

Official performance video
- "Congratulations" on YouTube

"Congratulations" is a song recorded by British singer Cliff Richard written by Bill Martin and Phil Coulter. It represented the United Kingdom in the Eurovision Song Contest 1968, held in London placing second behind the Spanish entry, "La, la, la".

The song went on to reach number 1 in many countries including Spain. He released the song in English, French, German, Spanish, and Italian.

== Background ==
=== Conception ===
Phil Coulter originally wrote the song as "I Think I Love You", but was unsure of the lyrics and got together with Bill Martin –the same team that wrote "Puppet on a String"–, who changed it to "Congratulations".

=== Eurovision ===
On 5 March 1968, "Congratulations " performed by Cliff Richard –who had already been internally selected– competed in the national final organized by the British Broadcasting Corporation (BBC) to select the song he would perform in the Eurovision Song Contest. The song won the competition so it became the British entry for the Eurovision Song Contest 1968, to be held in London. In addition to the English language version, he released the song in French, German, Spanish, and Italian.

The song was immediately popular in the UK and became a number one single. On the day of the contest, it was the favourite to win, so much so that the British press were posing the question: "What will come second to 'Congratulations'?".

On 6 April 1968, the Eurovision Song Contest was held at the Royal Albert Hall in London hosted by the BBC, and broadcast live throughout the continent. Cliff Richard performed "Congratulations" twelfth on the night following Italy's "Marianne" by Sergio Endrigo and preceding Norway's "Stress" by Odd Børre. The song was arranged, conducted and produced by Norrie Paramor who was also musical director for the event.

During the voting, "Congratulations" was leading for much of the way until the penultimate vote when Germany gave Spain six points, putting them one point ahead of the United Kingdom. It finished second just behind Spain's entry "La, la, la" by Massiel by just one point.

=== Aftermath ===
"Congratulations" went on to become a huge hit throughout Europe. In July 1968, the song was included on the six-track Columbia EP Congratulations: Cliff Sings 6 Songs for Europe.

The song is still popular and was chosen to lead the show which celebrated 50 years of Eurovision and which was named after it: Congratulations: 50 Years of the Eurovision Song Contest. Richard also performed the song as part of the commemorations for the 50th anniversary of VE Day in 1995, despite it having been written long after the end of World War II.

George Harrison's song "It's Johnny's Birthday" from his 1970 album All Things Must Pass is based on this song. The writers Martin and Coulter filed a claim in December 1970 against Harrison for royalties, and subsequent pressings of the album credit their contribution.

The song is used twice in season 3 of Squid Game.

== Chart performance ==
Chart (1968)	Peak position
Australia (Kent Music Report)	4
Austria (Ö3 Austria Top 40)	2
Belgium (Ultratop 50 Flanders)	1
Belgium (Ultratop 50 Wallonia)	1
Canada RPM Top Singles	32
Denmark	1
Finland (IFPI Finland)	3
France (SNEP)	20
Germany (GfK)	3
Ireland (IRMA)	1
Netherlands (Single Top 100)	1
New Zealand	2
Norway (VG-lista)	1
Spain (Promusicae)	1
South Africa (Springbok Radio / Radio Orion)	4
Switzerland (Schweizer Hitparade)	2
UK Singles (Official Charts)	1
US Billboard Hot 100	99

== Sales ==
Sales for Congratulations
Region	Sales
Germany	150,000
Worldwide	1,000,000

== See also ==
- Congratulations: 50 Years of the Eurovision Song Contest
