= Berntzen =

Berntzen is a surname. Notable people with the surname include:

- Einar Berntzen (born 1955), Norwegian political scientist
- Julian Berntzen (born 1981), Norwegian vocalist, pianist, violinist, and composer
- Rolf Berntzen (1918–2005), Norwegian actor, grandfather of Julian

== See also ==
- Berntsen
