= Mona Wessman =

- Born: March 24, 1948 (age 77); Nora Parish, Sweden
- Genres: Schlager
- Occupation: Singer
- Years active: 1967–1984

Mona Wessman, born 24 March 1948 in Nora Parish in Sweden, is a Swedish singer.

Her breakthrough came together with Nina Lizell and Claes-Göran Hederström in the Minishow TV show, which aired on Pentecost Saturday 1967. Her definitive breakthrough as a recording artist was Gå och göm dej, Åke Tråk, participating at Melodifestivalen 1968, ending up third, and becoming a Svensktoppen hit peaking at third position. The same year, she toured the folkparks of Sweden together with Nina and Claes-Göran. Sven Lindahl wrote another of her more successful songs, Hambostinta i kortkort.

During the autumn of 1968, she toured with Lenne Broberg, Claes-Göran Hederström and Hipp Happy Band, consisting of Mats Westman, Lasse Sandborg, Stefan Möller and Bertil Bodahl.

Scoring several Svensktoppen hits by the late 1960s, she also appeared in the 1968 film Åsa-Nisse och den stora kalabaliken. She also participated at Melodifestivalen 1973 where the song she performed, Helledudane en sån karl, ended up last.
