= Berndtsson =

Berndtsson or Berntsson is a Swedish surname. Notable people with the surname include:

== Berndtsson ==
- Bengt Berndtsson (1933–2015), Swedish football winger
- Berndt Berndtsson, Swedish sprint canoer
- Bo Berndtsson (born 1950), Swedish mathematician
- Karl Berndtsson (1892–1943), Swedish chess player
- Peter Berndtsson (born 1965), Swedish ice hockey centre

== Berntsson ==
- Åke Berntsson (1934–2016), Swedish rower
- Alexander Berntsson (born 1996), Swedish football player
- Billy Berntsson (born 1984), Swedish football player
- Johnie Berntsson (born 1972), Swedish sailor
- Kristoffer Berntsson (born 1982), Swedish figure skater
- Lena Berntsson (born 1978), Swedish athlete
- Stig Berntsson (1930–2011), Swedish sports shooter

== See also ==
- Berntson
