= Belgium in the Eurovision Song Contest 1968 =

- Eurovision Song Contest 1968
- Participating broadcaster: Radiodiffusion-télévision belge (RTB)
- Country: Belgium
- Selection process: Avante-Première Eurovision
- Selection date: 13 February 1968

Competing entry
- Song: "Quand tu reviendras"
- Artist: Claude Lombard
- Songwriters: Jo van Wetter; Roland Dero

Placement
- Final result: 7th, 8 points

Participation chronology

Belgium was represented at the Eurovision Song Contest 1968 with the song "Quand tu reviendras", composed by Jo van Wetter, with lyrics by Roland Dero, and performed by Claude Lombard. The Belgian participating broadcaster, French-speaking Radiodiffusion-télévision belge (RTB), selected its entry through a national final.

== Before Eurovision ==
=== Avante-Première Eurovision ===
La Sélection Belge pour le Concours Eurovision de la Chanson 1968 was the national final format developed by French-speaking broadcaster Radiodiffusion-télévision belge (RTB) in order to select the Belgian entry for the Eurovision Song Contest 1968. The competition was held on 13 February 1968.

==== Competing entries ====
RTB, in collaboration with SABAM, selected 10 artists to participate in the contest, who each submitted their own song.

==== Final ====
The final was held on 13 February 1968, in the Studio Mathonet, in Evere, Brussels, from 20:30 to 21:20 (CET), and was hosted by Paule Herreman. Ten songs competed in the contest, with the winner being decided upon by regional public juries from 4 French-speaking provinces; Brussels, Liège, Mons, and Namur. The four juries each had 10 points which they could hand out to the songs. Former Belgian representative Tonia (1966) and future participant Nicole Josy (1973, as one half of Nicole & Hugo) took part in the final.

At the close of the voting, "La boîte à musique", performed by Serge Davinac, was erroneously declared the winner before the votes were corrected, leading to Claude Lombard's victory.

Final – 13 February 1968
R/O	Artist	Song	Songwriter(s)		Points	Place
R/O	Artist	Song	Composer(s)	Lyricist(s)	Points	Place
1	André Brasseur	"Écoute le vent"	André Brasseur	Ch. Pheeuws	1	5
2	Serge Davignac	"La boîte à musique"	Roland Thyssen; Serge Davignac		14	2
3	Eddy Pauly	"Et je crie"	Robert Dewasme		0	7
4	Delphine	"Quand un garçon vous écrit"	David Bee; Robert Bichon		0	7
5	Tonia	"Il y avait"	Paul Quintens	Ph. Verdon	2	4
6	Jean Delsart	"Toi"	Gillis Remy		0	7
7	Rosy Dany	"Une tête renversée"	Tony Talado; C. Cremers		6	3
8	Claude Lombard	"Quand tu reviendras"	Jo Van Wetter	Roland Dero	16	1
9	Nicole Josy	"À la Nouvelle-Orléans"	Louis Noël; Jean Iliano	Louis Noël	1	5
10	Nathalie	"Goutte à goutte"	Tony Talado; Serge Chazaryzan		0	7

== At Eurovision ==
On the night of the final Lombard performed 3rd in the running order, following the Netherlands and preceding Austria. At the close of the voting "Quand tu reviendras" had received 8 points (3 from Italy and 1 apiece from Finland, France, Luxembourg, Portugal, and the United Kingdom), placing Belgium joint 7th (with Monaco and Yugoslavia) of the 17 participating countries. The Belgian jury awarded 6 of its 10 points to France.

=== Voting ===
Points awarded to Belgium
Score	Country
3 points	Italy
1 point	Finland; France; Portugal; Spain; United Kingdom

Points awarded by Belgium
Score	Country
6 points	France
2 points	United Kingdom
1 point	Ireland; Yugoslavia
