= Berntson =

Berntson is a surname. Notable people with the surname include:

- Eric Berntson (1941–2018), Canadian politician
- Gary Berntson (born 1945), American professor of psychology
- Sofia Berntson (born 1979), Swedish singer

== See also ==
- Berntsen
- Berntsson
