= Netherlands in the Eurovision Song Contest 1968 =

- Eurovision Song Contest 1968
- Participating broadcaster: Nederlandse Televisie Stichting (NTS)
- Country: Netherlands
- Selection process: Nationaal Songfestival 1968
- Selection date: 28 February 1968

Competing entry
- Song: "Morgen"
- Artist: Ronnie Tober
- Songwriters: Joop Stokkermans; Theo Strengers

Placement
- Final result: 16th, 1 point

Participation chronology

The Netherlands was represented at the Eurovision Song Contest 1968 with the song "Morgen", composed by Joop Stokkermans, with lyrics by Theo Strengers, and performed by Ronnie Tober. The Dutch participating Broadcaster, Nederlandse Televisie Stichting (NTS), selected its entry through a national final. Tober had previously finished second in the 1965 national final.

== Before Eurovision ==
=== Nationaal Songfestival 1968 ===
The national final was held at the Tivoli in Utrecht, hosted by Elles Berger. Six songs were originally lined up for the final, but singers Tante Leen and Trea Dobbs both withdrew, leaving a field of just four.

The song was reportedly chosen by a 325-piece public jury from different provinces of the country as well as a small professional jury. Tober received 117 votes from the public jury and 5 from the professional jury.

28 February 1968
R/O	Artist	Song	Points	Place
1	René Frank	"Annemarie"	75	3
2	Gonnie Baars	"Ik wil van alles"	47	4
3	Ronnie Tober	"Morgen"	122	1
4	Conny Vink	"Hé, moet je bij mij zijn"	78	2

== At Eurovision ==
On the night of the final Tober performed second in the running order, following Portugal and preceding Belgium. At the close of voting "Morgen" had received just 1 point (from Italy), placing the Netherlands joint last (with Finland) of the 17 entries. This was the fourth (and to date last in the finals) time the Netherlands ended the evening at the bottom of the scoreboard.

The Dutch conductor at the contest was Dolf van der Linden.

=== Voting ===
Points awarded to the Netherlands
Score	Country
1 point	Italy

Points awarded by the Netherlands
Score	Country
3 points	France
2 points	Monaco; United Kingdom
1 point	Ireland; Luxembourg; Sweden
