= Luxembourg in the Eurovision Song Contest 1968 =

- Eurovision Song Contest 1968
- Participating broadcaster: Compagnie Luxembourgeoise de Télédiffusion (CLT)
- Country: Luxembourg
- Selection process: DiscActualités
- Selection date: 4 February 1968

Competing entry
- Song: "Nous vivrons d'amour"
- Artist: Chris Baldo and Sophie Garel
- Songwriters: Jacques Demarny; Carlos Leresche

Placement
- Final result: 11th, 5 votes

Participation chronology

Luxembourg was represented at the Eurovision Song Contest 1968 with the song "Nous vivrons d'amour", composed by Carlos Leresche, with lyrics by Jacques Demarny, and performed by Chris Baldo and Sophie Garel. The Luxembourgish participating broadcaster, Compagnie Luxembourgeoise de Télédiffusion (CLT), selected its entry through a national final. The song, performed in position 5, placed eleventh tying with the song from Portugal, out of seventeen competing entries with 5 votes.

== Before Eurovision ==
=== DiscActualités ===
Radio Luxembourg (RTL) held a national final to select its entry for the Eurovision Song Contest 1968. RTL received 44 submissions and jurors in Villa Louvigny selected four songs to take part in the selection, with the running order being decided by a draw. Among the participants was Guy Bonnet, who would later represent France in 1970 and 1983. Competing artists had the option to add up to three additional singers to their songs. Chris Baldo chose Sophie Garel to sing with him shortly before the selection, while the remaining singers sang by themselves.

RTL held the song presentation on 29 January 1968 at 19:25 CET during the DiscActualités program. The show was hosted by René Guitton, the show's regular presenter.

The selected song was revealed six days after the show and was chosen by votes from the RTL jury and public listeners who voted via postcard. The winner, which was first reported on 4 February, was the song "Nous vivrons d'amour", composed by Carlos Leresche, with lyrics by Jacques Demarny, and performed by Chris Baldo and Sophie Garel.

Song presentation – 29 January 1968
Artist(s)	Song	Songwriter(s)
Chris Baldo and Sophie Garel	"Nous vivrons d'amour"	Carlos Leresche; Jacques Demarny
Guy Bonnet	"La mer et le vent"	Guy Bonnet; Henri Djian; Serge Lebrail
Patricia	"L'enfant qui venait pour jouer"	Unknown
Patricia	"La baleine bleue"	Unknown

== At Eurovision ==
At the Eurovision Song Contest 1968 in London, the Luxembourgish entry was the fifth song of the night following Austria and preceding Switzerland. The Luxembourgish entry was conducted by André Borly. At the close of voting, the song had received five votes and finished eleventh, tying with the song from Portugal, among the seventeen competing entries.

=== Voting ===
Each participating broadcaster assembled a ten-member jury panel. Every jury member could give one vote to their favourite song.

Votes awarded to Luxembourg
Score	Country
1 vote	Austria; France; Monaco; Netherlands; United Kingdom

Votes awarded by Luxembourg
Score	Country
3 votes	France
1 vote	Germany; Ireland; Monaco; Norway; Spain; United Kingdom; Yugoslavia
