= Sweden in the Eurovision Song Contest 1968 =

- Eurovision Song Contest 1968
- Participating broadcaster: Sveriges Radio (SR)
- Country: Sweden
- Selection process: Melodifestivalen 1968
- Selection date: 9 March 1968

Competing entry
- Song: "Det börjar verka kärlek, banne mej"
- Artist: Claes-Göran Hederström
- Songwriter: Peter Himmelstrand

Placement
- Final result: 5th, 15 points

Participation chronology

Sweden was represented at the Eurovision Song Contest 1968 with the song "Det börjar verka kärlek, banne mej", written by Peter Himmelstrand, and performed by Claes-Göran Hederström.The Swedish participating broadcaster, Sveriges Radio (SR), selected its entry through Melodifestivalen 1968. The entry finished 5th (out of 17) with 15 points, including 6 from Norway, the highest number of votes awarded that year.

== Before Eurovision ==
=== Melodifestivalen 1968 ===
Melodifestivalen 1968 was the selection for the 10th song to represent Sweden at the Eurovision Song Contest. It was the ninth time that Sveriges Radio (SR) used this system of picking a song. 2233 songs were submitted to SR for the competition. The final was held in the Cirkus in Stockholm on 9 March 1968, hosted by Magnus Banck and was broadcast on Sveriges Radio TV but was not broadcast on radio.

R/O	Artist	Song	Songwriters	Points	Place
1	Svante Thuresson	"Du är en vårvind i April"	Staffan Ehrling; Bo-Göran Edling	21	2
2	Anna-Lena Löfgren	"Jag vill tro"	Britt Lindeborg	5	6
3	Claes-Göran Hederström	"Det börjar verka kärlek, banne mej"	Peter Himmelstrand	23	1
4	Towa Carson	"Du vet var jag finns"	Peter Himmelstrand	15	3
5	Svante Thuresson and Östen Warnerbring	"Här kommer pojkar"	Sven Bergcrantz; Östen Warnerbring	13	5
6	Britt Bergström	"Fri hos dig"	Marcus Österdahl; Patrice Hellberg	1	9
7	Gunnar Wiklund	"Jag ser en värld"	Marcus Österdahl; Bengt Sundström	3	7
8	Cecilia Stam	"Låt mig få va' ifred"	Marcus Österdahl; Patrice Hellberg	3	7
9	Lars Lönndahl	"Du och jag och våren"	Thore Skogman	0	10
10	Mona Wessman	"Gå och göm dig, Åke Tråk"	Peter Himmelstrand	15	3

== At Eurovision ==
=== Voting ===
Points awarded to Sweden
Score	Country
6 points	Norway
4 points	Ireland
2 points	United Kingdom
1 point	Finland; Netherlands; Portugal

Points awarded by Sweden
Score	Country
4 points	Ireland
3 points	United Kingdom
2 points	Germany
1 point	France
