= Östen Warnerbring =

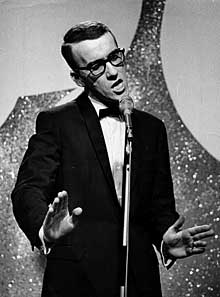
- Warnerbring in 1962

Background information
- Also known as: Östen med Rösten
- Born: 22 November 1934; Malmö, Sweden
- Died: 18 January 2006 (aged 71); San Agustín, Spain
- Genres: Jazz; schlager
- Occupations: Singer; songwriter; composer; musician
- Instruments: Vocals; saxophone; clarinet
- Years active: 1952–2005

Östen Warnerbring (22 November 1934 – 18 January 2006), also known as Östen med Rösten (lit. "Östen with the Voice"), was a Swedish singer, musician, composer, and lyrics writer who mastered several musical genres. He started as a jazz musician but over the years, he became known as a singer of other popular music, such as schlager music, and of Swedish poetry put into music by himself. In 1967, he represented Sweden at Eurovision Song Contest 1967 with the song ’’Som en dröm’’. In the 1970s, he became one of the first Swedish artists to use his native accent, of the province of Scania (Skåne) in the south of Sweden, also while singing.

== Early life ==
Warnerbring was born in Malmö. His family lived near the race track Jägersro, and as a child, Warnerbring entertained the racing audience by playing the harmonica to them. During his childhood and as a young man he had a variety of jobs, working as a messenger boy at Sydsvenska Dagbladet, as a tinsmith for a local roofing company, as a salesman, as a manager at the record company Oktav, and as a journalist at Skånska Dagbladet. Eventually, he had to choose between a career as a journalist or as a musician, and chose the latter. He lived most of his life in Skåne, in Skanör, Vellinge, Helsingborg, and Malmö.

== Career ==
Warnerbring's career started as a member of various orchestras playing at dances. His first record was released in 1952. His talents as a singer were discovered by Arne Domnérus in the mid-1950s, and in 1964 he started touring folkparks. His breakthrough came in 1965, when he sang En röd blomma till en blond flicka, a Swedish version of Red Roses for a Blue Lady. He was a popular cabaret artist, and also performed in musicals and on television.

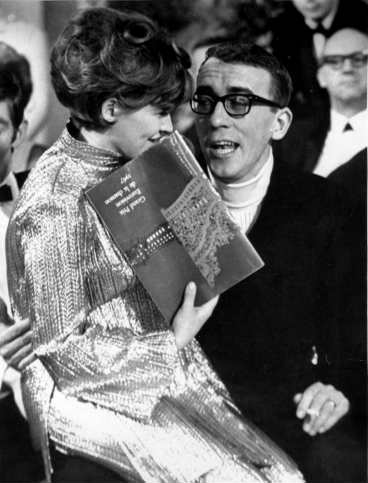
Warnerbring at Eurovision Song Contest 1967

Warnerbring participated eleven times in Melodifestivalen, the Swedish qualifying competition of the Eurovision Song Contest. His first appearance was in the 1959 contest with the song Kungsgatans blues which finished in fourth place. In 1960, he sang Alla andra får varann; the song won, and was performed by Siw Malmkvist at the Eurovision finals in London. Warnerbring sang two songs in the 1962 contest. Lolo Lolita placed fourth and Trollen ska trivas sixth. In 1967, Warnerbring won Melodifestivalen with ’’Som en dröm’’, and performed the song at that year's finals in Vienna, coming in eighth position out of 17. His final appearance in Melodifestivalen was in 1974, when En mysig vals, written by himself, was placed tenth and last.

== Later life ==
Warnerbring died in San Augustin, Canary Islands.

Preceded by Lill Lindfors and Svante Thuresson with "Nygammal vals"	Sweden in the Eurovision Song Contest; 1967	Succeeded by Claes-Göran Hederström with "Det börjar verka kärlek, banne mig"
