= Tommy Drennan =

Irish singer (1941/1942–2024)

Thomas Drennan (12 October 1941 – 11 July 2024) was an Irish classically trained lyric tenor and recording artist. Associated for the most part with the showband era, his discography includes fourteen Top 20 singles and nine Top 10 singles in the Irish Charts. His rendition of O Holy Night on the Columbia Records (EMI) label, became the Irish Christmas No.1 single for 1971.

== Life and career ==
Drennan was born in October 1941, in the Janesboro area of Limerick and was educated at Presentation Convent before moving to Limerick CBS. He was first introduced to singing when he joined the Redemptorists church choir as an 11-year-old boy soprano. Drennan's 1953 rendition of O Holy Night brought him to prominence. He later studied voice at the Royal Irish Academy of Music. During this time Drennan was first prize winner at the Feis Ceoil, appeared on several half-hour programmes of classical songs for Radio Éireann, and also appeared regularly on Ulster Television in Teatime With Tommy.

Drennan toured as lead singer with The Freshmen before later becoming lead singer with the Limerick-based showband The Monarchs. The band released several albums under the EMI label and had numerous hit singles which reached number one in the Irish Charts, including a 1971 version of O Holy Night which merged his original 1953 recording with a contemporary version. Drennan also reached the semi-finals of the 1968 National Contest.

Drennan died at the age of 82 at Milford Care Centre on 11 July 2024.
