= Ireland in the Eurovision Song Contest 1968 =

- Eurovision Song Contest 1968
- Participating broadcaster: Radio Telefís Éireann (RTÉ)
- Country: Ireland
- Selection process: National Song Contest
- Selection date: 3 March 1968

Competing entry
- Song: "Chance of a Lifetime"
- Artist: Pat McGeegan
- Songwriter: John Kennedy

Placement
- Final result: 4th, 18 points

Participation chronology

Ireland was represented at the Eurovision Song Contest 1968 with the song "Chance of a Lifetime", written by John Kennedy, and performed by Pat McGeegan. The Irish participating broadcaster, Radio Telefís Éireann (RTÉ), selected its entry through a national final.

The contestants in the Irish National Final were decided by two semi-finals, where three were chosen from the first which was held on 6 February with the second being held on 20 February. The Final was held on 3 March 1968 and was broadcast on RTÉ TV from Dublin. All three shows were hosted by Brendan O'Reilly.

== Before Eurovision ==
=== National Song Contest ===
The fourth National Song Contest consisted of two semi-finals and a final, held by Radio Telefís Éireann (RTÉ) in its studios in Dublin, hosted by Brendan O'Reilly. This was the first time that an Irish national final had a semi-final and remained the only time until 1996.

==== Competing entries ====
RTÉ opened a submission period for composers to submit songs between 27 October 1967 and 1 January 1968. Composers had to be Irish-born or live in Ireland and could only submit a maximum of two songs each. RTÉ selected 16 songs from the received submissions.

Artist	Song	Songwriter(s)
Alma Carroll	"Give Me All Your Love"	Joe Burkett
Anna McGoldrick	"Gleann na Smól"	Stephen Redmond S.J.
Anne Bushnell	"Ballad to a Boy"	Frank Dunne; Dolores Rockett
Dawn Knight	"Why?"	Mary MacDonagh
Deirdre Wynne	"Woman Beside the Phone"	Sean Fitzpatrick
Frances McDermott	"Since the Spring"	Sean Byrne
Frankie McBride	"You're Not There at All"	Hedley Kay
Gregory	"You Can't Have Everything"	John McBreen; Eamon O'Shea
Joan Connolly	"Grown Up World"	Séamus Fox
Leslie Cooke	"Happy"	Peter O'Brien
Pat Lynch	"Kinsale"	Jack Brierley; George Crosbie
Pat McGeegan	"Chance of a Lifetime"	John Kennedy
Roly Daniels	"Look for Love"	Andrew Dunne
Tina	"One Love Two"	Jim Doherty
Tommy Drennan	"If You Love Me"	Michael Reade
Tony Kenny	"Bright Butterfly"	Helen Dunne; Dolores Rockett

==== Semi-finals ====
The exact results for the semi-finals are unknown. Although three songs were intended to qualify from each semi-final, a mistake where song 'M' ("Gleann na Smól") was accidentally announced as having qualified instead of song 'N' ("Chance of a Lifetime"), meant that both songs qualified from the second semi-final.

Semi-Final 1 – 6 February 1968
R/O	Artist	Song	Result
1	Leslie Cooke	"Happy"	—N/a
2	Deirdre Wynne	"Woman Beside the Phone"	—N/a
3	Pat Lynch	"Kinsale"	Qualified
4	Joan Connolly	"Grown Up World"	—N/a
5	Tony Kenny	"Bright Butterfly"	Qualified
6	Dawn Knight	"Why?"	—N/a
7	Frankie McBride	"You're Not There at All"	—N/a
8	Tina	"One Love Two"	Qualified

Semi-Final 2 – 20 February 1968
R/O	Artist	Song	Result
1	Gregory	"You Can't Have Everything"	—N/a
2	Frances McDermott	"Since the Spring"	Qualified
3	Tommy Drennan	"If You Love Me"	—N/a
4	Anna McGoldrick	"Gleann na Smól"	Qualified
5	Pat McGeegan	"Chance of a Lifetime"	Qualified
6	Alma Carroll	"Give Me All Your Love"	Qualified
7	Roly Daniels	"Look for Love"	—N/a
8	Anne Bushnell	"Ballad to a Boy"	—N/a

==== Final ====
The final was held on 3 March 1968 at the RTÉ studios in Dublin, hosted by Brendan O'Reilly. The results were decided by 10 regional juries.

Final – 3 March 1968
R/O	Artist	Song	Points	Place
1	Anna McGoldrick	"Gleann na Smól"	4	5
2	Tony Kenny	"Bright Butterfly"	0	7
3	Frances McDermott	"Since the Spring"	2	6
4	Pat McGeegan	"Chance of a Lifetime"	15	1
5	Tina	"One Love Two"	13	3
6	Pat Lynch	"Kinsale"	14	2
7	Alma Carroll	"Give Me All Your Love"	12	4

== At Eurovision ==
Ireland started at number 14 in the startfield and finished 4th with 18 points.

=== Voting ===
Points awarded to Ireland
Score	Country
6 points	Yugoslavia
4 points	Austria; Sweden
1 point	Belgium; Luxembourg; Netherlands; Portugal

Points awarded by Ireland
Score	Country
4 points	Sweden
3 points	Yugoslavia
1 point	Monaco; Spain; United Kingdom
