= Dubrovački trubaduri =

Yugoslavian band

Dubrovački trubaduri (Croatian for "Dubrovnik Troubadours") was a Croatian beat, folk and pop band from Dubrovnik formed in 1961 by Đelo Jusić, main composer, guitar and mandolin player and leader of the group. They were very popular in Yugoslavia during the 1960s and 1970s for their mixture of pop music and medieval folk traditions of their native ancient city on the Adriatic coast. Internationally also known as 'Dubrovnic Troubadours or The Troubadours Of Dubrovnik, they enjoyed brief popularity across Western Europe having appeared at the Eurovision Song Contest 1968 in London. Their song "Jedan dan" was performed by their singers Luciano "Lući" Capurso and Hamo Hajdarhodžić and it scored 7th position. Their other major hits include "Dok Palme Njišu Grane" from 1971, and the Italian-influenced "Noćna Muzika" from 1972. The group, in different line-ups, existed until the early 1980s when they broke up.

== Band members ==
- Đelo Jusić – guitar, mandolin, piano, organ, vocals
- Luciano Capurso Lući – clarinet, saxophone, flute, vocals
- Marko Brešković – bass, vocals
- Slobodan Berdović Bobo – piano, organ, vocals
- Ladislav Pađen Laci – drums, vocals
- Hamo Hajdarhodžić – vocals, guitar
- Hrvoje Filičić - drums
- Đoni Trbuhović - piano
- Vladimir Ruspudić - drums
- Miro Kerner - keyboards
- Milo Hrnić - vocals
- Oliver Dragojević - keyboards
- Goran Baranović - guitar
- Dragomir-Dragan Đorđević, guitar and vocal
- Zoran Vlaović - guitar
- Srećko Kljunak - guitar
- Mujica Jusić - drums /
- Mime Šime Restović - drums
- Mladen Vučić - drums
- Mladen Špilj Papan - drums
- Braco Tepšić - keyboards
- Nevio Končić - keyboards

== Discography ==
=== Albums ===
- Jedan Dan (EMI/Columbia, 1968)
- Mi prepuni smo ljubavi (Jugoton, 1970)
- Pusti da ti leut svira (Jugoton, 1971)
- Dubrovački trubaduri (RTV Ljubljana, 1971)
- Recital At The Festival «The Golden Orpheus '72», split-LP w/ Ben Cramer (Balkanton, 1972)
- 12 velikih uspjeha (Jugoton, 1980)
- Pusti da ti leut svira (Croatia Records, 1993)
- Zlatna kolekcija (Croatia Records, 2008)

=== EPs ===
- "Oj djevojko, dušo moja" / "Trubadurska serenada" / "Djevojka mlada" / "Serenada Dubrovniku" (1966)
- "Auto-Stop" / "Dundo pero" / "Linđo" / "Ljuven zov" (1967)
- "Jedan dan" / "Moja je djevojka obična" / "Mi prepuni smo ljubavi" / "Luda mladost" (1968)

=== Singles ===
- "Jedan dan" / "Trubadurska serenada" (1968) (Najpoznatija)
- "Jedan dan" / "Luda mladost" (1968)
- "Lero" / "Linđo" (1968)
- "A Day Or Two" (1968)
- "Ima sunca za sve nas" / "Kad se jednom rastanemo" (1969)
- "Pusti da ti leut svira" / "Ona i prijatelj moj" (1970)
- "Marijana" / "Luda pjesma" (1970)
- "Lijepo ime vino" / "Pjesma puni život moj" (1970)
- "Znam da ima jedna staza" / "Sve do jučer" (1970)
- "U ranu zoru" / "Anđele moj" (1971)
- "Dok palme njišu grane" / "Kako djeca spavaju" (1971)
- "Noćna muzika" / "U mome gradu" (1972)
- "Mi smo dečki, kaj pijemo stoječki" / "Ljubav je bol na srcu mom" (1972)
- "Plakala djevojka mlada" / "Repetaši" (1973)
- "Spavaj, spavaj draga" / "Marijana" (1973)
- "Bundeve i tikve" / "Ovo je naš grad" (1973)
- "Vudrimo, dečki" / "Adio, Mare" (1974)
- "Moj je otac bio partizan" / "Ako voliš iskreno" (1974)
- "Laku noć, trubaduri" / "Oprosti, dušo" (1974)
- "Mirno spavaj dušo" / "Sviramo, pjevamo, muzika smo mi" (1975)
- "Luna" / "Zeleni se ružmarin" (1976)
- "Tiho je negdje svirala mandolina" / "Naranče su procvjetale" (1976)
- "Ljubavni jadi jednog trubadura" / "Najljepši si cvijet u vrtu punom ruža" (1977)
- "Mala Nera" / "Ča će mi slava" (1978)
- "Ka' san bija mali" / "Da nije ljubavi" (1979)
