= Claude Lombard =

Belgian singer (1945–2021)

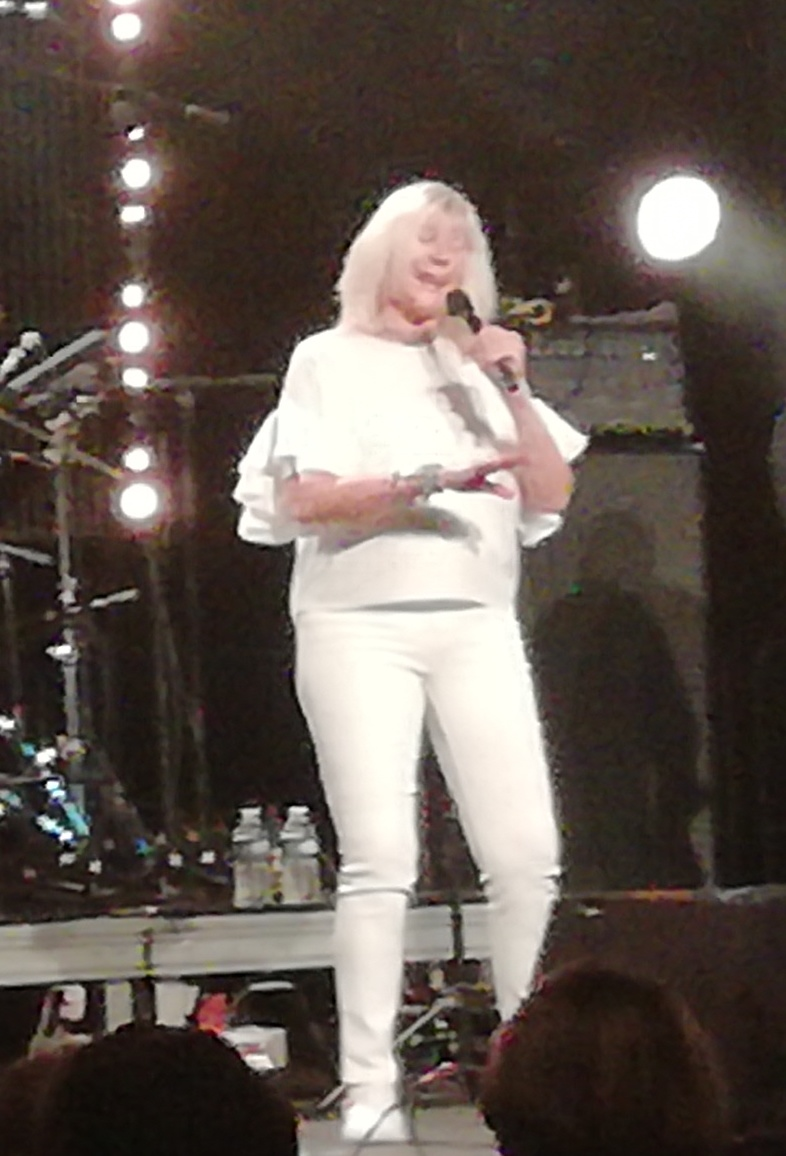

Background information
- Born: 25 February 1945
- Origin: Brussels, Belgium
- Died: 20 September 2021 (aged 76)
- Genres: Pop
- Occupation: Singer
- Years active: 1968–2021

Claude Lombard (25 February 1945 – 20 September 2021) was a Belgian singer, best known internationally for her participation in the 1968 Eurovision Song Contest.

== Early career ==
Lombard studied at INSAS, a college of film, theatre and television studies in Brussels. She learned to play piano and guitar, and began composing music.

== Eurovision Song Contest ==
In 1968, Lombard's song "Quand tu reviendras" ("When You Come Back") was chosen by jury voting from ten songs as the Belgian representative in the 13th Eurovision Song Contest, which took place on 6 April in London. "Quand tu reviendras" finished in joint seventh place (with Monaco and Yugoslavia) of 17 entries.

Lombard returned to Eurovision in 1973, albeit as a backing singer, for that year's Belgian entry "Baby, Baby" performed by Nicole & Hugo. Although this finished in last place in the voting, the song, and particularly the performance, has since assumed iconic status in the Eurovision fan community.

== Later career ==
Lombard moved to France in the 1970s. She co-wrote a successful musical called Attention – fragile, and had gone on to enjoy a successful career as a musical voiceover artist in film and television, with many credits to her name. Films and shows she had worked on include Beauty and the Beast, its live action remake, The Prince of Egypt and Fraggle Rock. She also sang the French version of the Ai no Wakakusa Monogatari theme song in 1988, entitled Les quatre filles du docteur March.

| Preceded by Louis Neefs with "Ik heb zorgen" | Belgium in the Eurovision Song Contest; 1968 | Succeeded by Louis Neefs with "Jennifer Jennings" |
