= Sophie Garel =

French radio and television personality and singer (1942–2026)

- Born: Lucienne Gabrielle Garcia; 22 April 1942; Oran, French Algeria
- Died: 14 May 2026 (aged 84)
- Occupations: Radio and television presenter; singer

Lucienne Gabrielle Garcia (22 April 1942 – 14 May 2026), better known by the stage name Sophie Garel, was a French radio and television personality and singer.

She represented Luxembourg in the Eurovision Song Contest 1968, finishing in eleventh place with the duet "Nous vivrons d'amour" alongside Chris Baldo. In media, she was most well-known for her work on RTL's Les Grosses Têtes.

Garel died on 14 May 2026, at the age of 84.
