= Gianni Mascolo =

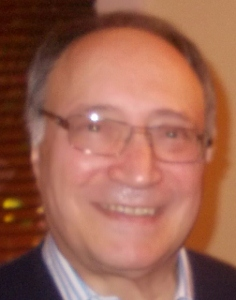
- Mascolo in 2012

Background information
- Born: 3 November 1940; Milan, Italy
- Origin: Milan, Italy
- Died: 21 December 2016 (aged 76); London, United Kingdom
- Genres: Pop
- Occupation: Singer

Gianni Mascolo (3 November 1940 – 21 December 2016) was an Italian singer, best known for his participation on behalf of Switzerland in the 1968 Eurovision Song Contest.

At the age of 10, Mascolo joined the chorus of La Scala in Milan, remaining there for five years until his voice broke. He then studied at the Milan Conservatory, and graduated in pianoforte. He started singing in the Milan area, and was offered a recording contract with local label Ariston in 1964. The following year he participated in the San Remo Festival, duetting with Dusty Springfield on the song "Di fronte all'amore", composed by Umberto Bindi, which failed to progress to the final.

Following participation in several other music festivals, Mascolo was invited to take part in the Swiss Eurovision selection in 1968 with the song "Guardando il sole" ("Looking at the Sun"), which won the competition and went forward to the 13th Eurovision Song Contest, held in London on 6 April. The arrangement for his song was written by Giampiero Reverberi and adapted by Mario Robbiani; on the night, Robbiani also conducted the orchestra. "Guardando il sole" only picked up two points (both from Yugoslavia), to finish in joint 13th place of 17 entries.

Mascolo released his last single in 1969, before retiring from the music industry as the 1970s dawned. Moving to Britain, he ran a restaurant in Sydenham, London, with his English wife.

Preceded by Géraldine with "Quel cœur vas-tu briser ?"	Switzerland in the Eurovision Song Contest; 1968	Succeeded by Paola Del Medico with "Bonjour, bonjour"
