= United Kingdom in the Eurovision Song Contest 1968 =

- Eurovision Song Contest 1968
- Participating broadcaster: British Broadcasting Corporation (BBC)
- Country: United Kingdom
- Selection process: Artist: Internal selection Song: A Song for Europe 1968
- Announcement date: 12 March 1968

Competing entry
- Song: "Congratulations"
- Artist: Cliff Richard
- Songwriters: Bill Martin; Phil Coulter

Placement
- Final result: 2nd, 28 points

Participation chronology

The United Kingdom was represented at the Eurovision Song Contest 1968 with the song "Congratulations", written by Bill Martin and Phil Coulter, and performed by Cliff Richard. The British participating broadcaster, the British Broadcasting Corporation (BBC), selected its entry through a national final, after having previously selected the performer internally. In addition, the BBC was also the host broadcaster and staged the event at the Royal Albert Hall in London, after winning the previous edition with the song "Puppet on a String" by Sandie Shaw.

== Before Eurovision ==
=== Artist selection ===
Cilla Black had been the BBC's first choice to sing the 1968 British entry, but she had turned it down as she did not believe any nation was likely to win back-to-back contests. As in 1967 when the UK won with Sandie Shaw, a current pop singer, Cliff Richard, was chosen to sing the song.

=== A Song for Europe 1968 ===
The show was held on 5 March 1968 and presented by Cilla Black as a special edition of her debut BBC1 TV series Cilla. Unlike the last three UK selections, the songs were not presented at all before the final. Instead, for the first time, the songs were broadcast twice in the final, with the performances repeated immediately after Richard had sung them successively. Viewers cast votes by postcard via mail to choose the winner and 171,300 chose Congratulations, a catchy party song, with the runner up over 140,000 behind in the poll. The result was broadcast one week later on 12 March 1968. The votes presented below were only announced rounded up.

A Song for Europe 1968 – 5 March 1968
| R/O | Song | Votes | Place |
|---|---|---|---|
| 1 | "Wonderful World" | 19,990 | 3 |
| 2 | "Do You Remember?" | 4,200 | 6 |
| 3 | "High 'n' Dry" | 30,500 | 2 |
| 4 | "The Sound of the Candyman's Trumpet" | 11,200 | 4 |
| 5 | "Congratulations" | 171,300 | 1 |
| 6 | "Little Rag Doll" | 10,400 | 5 |

=== Chart success ===
Richard released all six short listed songs on an Extended Play maxi single titled Congratulations: Cliff sings 6 Songs for Europe, with the winner and the runner up being released on a standard single that spent two weeks at No.1 in the UK Singles Chart. This was the first of only two tracks from the Eurovision Song Contest that topped the UK chart without winning the competition. Cliff recorded French, German, Italian and Spanish versions of the winning song, as well as a German version of Wonderful World, which was also recorded (in English) by Elvis Presley.

== At Eurovision ==
"Congratulations" won the national and went on to come a close second in the contest, losing only to Spain by one point.

The contest was broadcast on BBC1, with a colour re-broadcast on BBC2 the next day at 16:30 (BST). It was also broadcast on BBC Radio 2 (with commentary by Pete Murray), which was also simulcast on BBC Radio 1. The show was seen by 23.5 million viewers.

The BBC appointed Michael Aspel as its spokesperson to announce the British jury's votes.

=== Voting ===
Points awarded to the United Kingdom
| Score | Country |
|---|---|
| 5 points | Monaco |
| 4 points | France; Switzerland |
| 3 points | Sweden |
| 2 points | Belgium; Finland; Germany; Netherlands |
| 1 point | Ireland; Italy; Luxembourg; Portugal |

Points awarded by the United Kingdom
| Score | Country |
|---|---|
| 5 points | Germany |
| 2 points | Sweden |
| 1 point | Belgium; Luxembourg; Monaco |

== Congratulations: 50 Years of the Eurovision Song Contest ==
In 2005, "Congratulations" was one of fourteen songs chosen by Eurovision fans and an EBU reference group to participate in the Congratulations anniversary competition. It was one of two British entries to appear in the main competition (along with "Save Your Kisses for Me"). The song was drawn to perform first, preceding "What's Another Year" by Johnny Logan.

At the end of the first round, "Congratulations" was not among the five songs proceeding to the final round. It was later revealed that "Congratulations" finished eighth with 105 points.

=== Voting ===
Points awarded to "Congratulations" (Round 1)
| Score | Country |
|---|---|
| 12 points | |
| 10 points | Austria; Malta |
| 8 points | Andorra; Cyprus |
| 7 points | Poland; Sweden |
| 6 points | Denmark |
| 5 points | Croatia; Iceland; Ireland; Latvia; Ukraine |
| 4 points | Norway; Romania |
| 3 points | Greece; Netherlands |
| 2 points | Germany; Portugal; Spain |
| 1 point | Bosnia and Herzegovina; Finland; Serbia and Montenegro; Slovenia |
