= Berntsen =

Berntsen may refer to:

- Aage Berntsen (1885–1952), Danish doctor, fencer and writer
- Annie Skau Berntsen (1911–1992), Norwegian missionary
- Bernt Berntsen (1863–1933), Norwegian-American missionary
- Bjarne Berntsen (born 1956), Norwegian footballer
- Carl Berntsen (1913–2004), Danish sailor
- Daniel Berntsen (born 1993), Norwegian footballer
- Einar Berntsen (1891–1965), Norwegian sailor
- Espen Berntsen (born 1967), Norwegian football referee
- Gary Berntsen, American intelligence officer
- Gunnar Berntsen (born 1977), German footballer
- Harald Berntsen (born 1945), Norwegian historian
- Hedda Berntsen (born 1976), Norwegian skier
- Ingrid Berntsen (born 1978), Norwegian skier
- Jack Berntsen (1940–2010), Norwegian musician
- Jan Erik Berntsen (1944–2025), Norwegian actor and singer
- Jostein Berntsen (1943–2024), Norwegian politician
- Klaus Berntsen (1844–1927), Danish politician
- Mona-Jeanette Berntsen, Norwegian hip-hop dancer
- Ole Berntsen (1915–1996), Danish sailor
- Oluf Berntsen (1891–1987), Danish fencer
- Parelius Hjalmar Bang Berntsen (1910–1995), Norwegian politician
- Robin Berntsen (born 1970), Norwegian footballer
- Simen Berntsen (born 1976), Norwegian ski jumper
- Søren Berntsen (1880–1940), whaler
- Thomas Berntsen (born 1970), Norwegian footballer
- Thorbjørn Berntsen (born 1935), Norwegian politician
- Tommy Berntsen (born 1973), Norwegian footballer
- William Berntsen (1912–1994), Danish sailor
