= Peter Berndtsson =

Swedish ice hockey centre (born 1965)

- Born: January 28, 1965 (age 61) Grums, SWE
- Height: 6 ft 2 in (188 cm)
- Weight: 189 lb (86 kg; 13 st 7 lb)
- Position: Centre
- Shot: Right
- Played for: Färjestads BK; Örebro IK; HV71; Västra Frölunda; JYP; Linköpings HC
- Playing career: 1983–2002

Peter Berndtsson (born January 28, 1965) is a Swedish retired ice hockey centre. He spent ten seasons with Västra Frölunda from 1989 to 1996 and then again from 1997 to 2000. He also played for Färjestads BK, Örebro IK, HV 71 and Linköpings HC and also had a spell in Finland's SM-liiga for JYP.

== Career statistics ==
			Regular season					Playoffs
Season	Team	League	GP	G	A	Pts	PIM	GP	G	A	Pts	PIM
1980–81	Grums IK	Division 2	3	1	0	1	—	—	—	—	—	—
1981–82	Grums IK	Division 2	22	13	9	22	—	—	—	—	—	—
1982–83	Färjestad BK J18		—	—	—	—	—	—	—	—	—	—
1982–83	Färjestad BK J20	Juniorserien	—	—	—	—	—	—	—	—	—	—
1983–84	Färjestad BK J20	Juniorserien	—	—	—	—	—	—	—	—	—	—
1983–84	Färjestad BK	Elitserien	6	0	0	0	0	—	—	—	—	—
1984–85	Färjestad BK J20	Juniorserien	—	—	—	—	—	—	—	—	—	—
1984–85	Färjestad BK	Elitserien	18	2	2	4	2	2	0	0	0	0
1985–86	Örebro IK	Division 1	32	17	18	35	20	—	—	—	—	—
1986–87	Örebro IK	Division 1	32	20	21	41	14	6	4	4	8	2
1987–88	HV71	Elitserien	36	15	16	31	8	2	0	0	0	4
1988–89	HV71	Elitserien	40	17	18	35	14	3	2	0	2	0
1989–90	Västra Frölunda HC	Elitserien	40	4	8	12	30	—	—	—	—	—
1990–91	Västra Frölunda HC	Elitserien	22	7	4	11	4	—	—	—	—	—
1990–91	Västra Frölunda HC	Allsvenskan D1	18	10	7	17	20	10	5	9	14	6
1991–92	Västra Frölunda HC	Elitserien	39	12	19	31	34	3	2	1	3	2
1992–93	Västra Frölunda HC	Elitserien	22	8	5	13	26	—	—	—	—	—
1992–93	Västra Frölunda HC	Allsvenskan D1	18	4	8	12	20	3	2	2	4	0
1993–94	Västra Frölunda HC	Elitserien	40	8	14	22	24	4	0	3	3	2
1994–95	Västra Frölunda HC	Elitserien	21	4	3	7	10	—	—	—	—	—
1994–95	Västra Frölunda HC	Allsvenskan D1	18	9	11	20	6	5	1	1	2	8
1995–96	Västra Frölunda HC	Elitserien	40	9	13	22	32	13	5	3	8	12
1996–97	JYP Jyväskylä	SM-liiga	50	14	24	38	22	4	1	2	3	6
1997–98	Västra Frölunda HC	Elitserien	45	6	18	24	34	7	0	1	1	2
1998–99	Västra Frölunda HC	Elitserien	50	11	17	28	32	4	0	1	1	2
1999–00	Västra Frölunda HC	Elitserien	49	2	5	7	16	5	1	1	2	2
2000–01	Linköping HC	Allsvenskan	41	15	18	33	18	10	3	4	7	6
2001–02	Linköping HC	Elitserien	41	5	6	11	14	—	—	—	—	—
Elitserien totals			509	110	148	258	280	43	10	10	20	26
