= Switzerland in the Eurovision Song Contest 1968 =

- Eurovision Song Contest 1968
- Participating broadcaster: Swiss Broadcasting Corporation (SRG SSR)
- Country: Switzerland
- Selection process: Gran Premio Eurovisione della canzone 1968
- Selection date: 27 January 1968

Competing entry
- Song: "Guardando il sole"
- Artist: Gianni Mascolo
- Songwriters: Aldo D'Addario; Sanzio Chiesa

Placement
- Final result: 13th, 2 votes

Participation chronology

Switzerland was represented at the Eurovision Song Contest 1968 with the song "Guardando il sole", composed by Aldo D'Addario, with lyrics by Sanzio Chiesa, and performed by Gianni Mascolo. The Swiss participating broadcaster, the Swiss Broadcasting Corporation (SRG SSR), selected its entry through a national final.

== Before Eurovision ==
=== Gran Premio Eurovisione della canzone 1968 ===
The Swiss Broadcasting Corporation (SRG SSR) held a national final to select its entry for the Eurovision Song Contest 1968. Six songs took part in the selection, with two songs being performed each in French, German, and Italian. Six artists took part in the selection, among whom was Paola del Medico— who would later represent Switzerland in 1969 and 1980.

Competing entries
Broadcaster	Artist	Song	Songwriter(s)		Language
Broadcaster	Artist	Song	Composer	Lyricist	Language
TSR	Charles Level	"Il n'y a pas trente-six façons"	Roland Vincent	Pierre Alain	French
TSR	Irène Berthier	"Le bonheur connaît plus"	Bernhard Kessler	Gérard Grey	French
DRS	Paola del Medico	"Für alle Zeiten"	Ed Viller	Fini Busch	German
DRS	Bea Abrecht	"Gefährlich"	Julius Schmid		German
TSI	Gianni Mascolo	"Guardando il sole"	Aldo D'Addario	Sanzio Chiesa	Italian
TSI	Ricky Gianco	"Passo di danza"	Mario Robbiani	Giorgio Calabrese	Italian

Swiss Italian broadcaster Televisione svizzera di lingua italiana (TSI) staged the national final on 27 January 1968 at 21:30 CET in a television studio in Paradiso, Lugano. It was presented by Mascia Cantoni. Mario Robbiani served as the musical director and accompanied the orchestra. Quartetto Cetra also performed at the event. The final was broadcast by TV DRS, TSR (with commentary by Georges Hardy), and TSI.

The voting consisted of a twelve-member jury from the three regions of Switzerland, which featured four members per region; the Swiss-German region, Romandy (Swiss-French region), and Ticino (Swiss-Italian region). Each juror would give 3 points to their favourite song, 2 to their second favourite, and 1 to their third favourite. The winner was the song "Guardando il sole", written by Aldo D'Addario, composed by Sanzio Chiesa, and performed by Gianni Mascolo. It is reported that "Il n'y a pas trente-six façons" by Charles Level was favoured by the Ticinese jury. Ricky Gianco also reportedly finished with a low score. Known results are listed in the chart below.

Final – 27 January 1968
R/O	Artist	Song	Total	Place
1	Charles Level	"Il n'y a pas trente-six façons"	18	2
2	Paola del Medico	"Für alle Zeiten"	15	3
3	Gianni Mascolo	"Guardando il sole"	19	1
4	Irène Berthier	"Le bonheur connaît plus"	Unknown	
5	Bea Abrecht	"Gefährlich"	Unknown	
6	Ricky Gianco	"Passo di danza"	Unknown	

=== Releases ===
"Guardando il sole" by Gianni Mascolo was recorded and released on a single under the same title in 1968. In 1998, the song was featured in a CD compilation titled "Concours Eurovision De La Chanson 1956-1998: Schweizer Beiträge", which compiled every Swiss Eurovision entry at the time.

Apart from the winning song, the only other song from the selection that was recorded and released commercially was "Für alle Zeiten" by Paola del Medico, which first appeared on a single as the B-side titled "Er Kam Mit Einem Roten Rosenstrauß" in 1968.

A recording of "Il n'y a pas trente-six façons" by Charles Level and a cover of "Passo di danza", sung by Gianni Mascolo have been preserved in the Swiss National Sound Archives.

== At Eurovision ==
At the Eurovision Song Contest 1968 in London, the Swiss entry was the sixth song of the night following Luxembourg and preceding Monaco. It was conducted by Mario Robbiani, who previously conducted the Swiss entries in 1960, "Cielo e terra" by Anita Traversi, and 1965, "Non, à jamais sans toi" by Yovanna; the first one was written by him. At the close of voting, Switzerland had received two votes and finished thirteenth among the seventeen participants.

The contest was broadcast on SRG SSR via TV DRS (with commentary from Theodor Haller) and Radio Beromünster (Note: Delayed broadcast on 8 April at 22:30 (CET)) (with commentary from Albert Werner) in German-speaking Switzerland, TSR (with commentary from Georges Hardy) in Romandy, and TSI in Ticino.

=== Voting ===
Each participating broadcaster assembled a ten-member jury panel. Every jury member could give one point to their favourite song.

Votes awarded to Switzerland
Score	Country
2 votes	Yugoslavia

Votes awarded by Switzerland
Score	Country
4 votes	United Kingdom
3 votes	France
2 votes	Italy
1 votes	Germany
