= Finland in the Eurovision Song Contest 1968 =

- Eurovision Song Contest 1968
- Participating broadcaster: Yleisradio (Yle)
- Country: Finland
- Selection process: National final
- Announcement date: 2 March 1968

Competing entry
- Song: "Kun kello käy"
- Artist: Kristina Hautala
- Songwriters: Esko Linnavalli; Juha Vainio

Placement
- Final result: 16th, 1 point

Participation chronology

Finland was represented at the Eurovision Song Contest 1968 with the song "Kun kello käy", composed by Esko Linnavalli, with lyrics by Juha Vainio, and performed by Kristina Hautala. The Finnish participating broadcaster, Yleisradio (Yle), selected its entry in the contest through a national final.

== Before Eurovision ==
=== National final ===
Six entries were selected for the competition from over 200 received submissions. Yleisradio (Yle) held the Finnish national final on 10 February 1968 at its television studios in Helsinki, hosted by Liisa Horelli. Public got to decide the representant for the first time. The winner was chosen by postcard voting where each voter awarded 5, 3, and 1 points to their three favorite songs. The voting ended on 16 February 1968, and results were announced on 2 March 1968.

Final – 10 February 1968
R/O	Artist	Song	Songwriter(s)	Votes	Place
1	Inga Sulin	"Niin kuin jokainen"	Åke Granholm; Sauvo Puhtila	—N/a	5
2	Aarno Raninen	"On hetki"	Rauno Lehtinen	60,279	3
3	Anki Lindqvist	"Sanoja kuulemaan jään"	Åke Granholm	—N/a	6
4	Kristina Hautala	"Kun kello käy"	Esko Linnavalli; Juha Vainio	159,667	1
5	Johnny	"Kissankellojen aikaan"	Åke Granholm; Sauvo Puhtila	113,067	2
6	Irina Milan	"Pois kuihtuu ruusu kaunein"	Aarno Raninen; Jussi Raittinen	51,697	4

== At Eurovision ==
On the night of the final Kristina Hautala performed ninth in the running order, following Sweden and preceding France. The entry was conducted by Ossi Runne. At the close of voting, Finland picked up one point from Norway and placed joint last with the Netherlands of the 17 entries.

Points awarded to Finland
Score	Country
1 point	Norway

Points awarded by Finland
Score	Country
3 points	Monaco; Spain
2 points	United Kingdom
1 point	Belgium; Sweden
