= Claes-Göran Hederström =

Swedish singer (1945–2022)

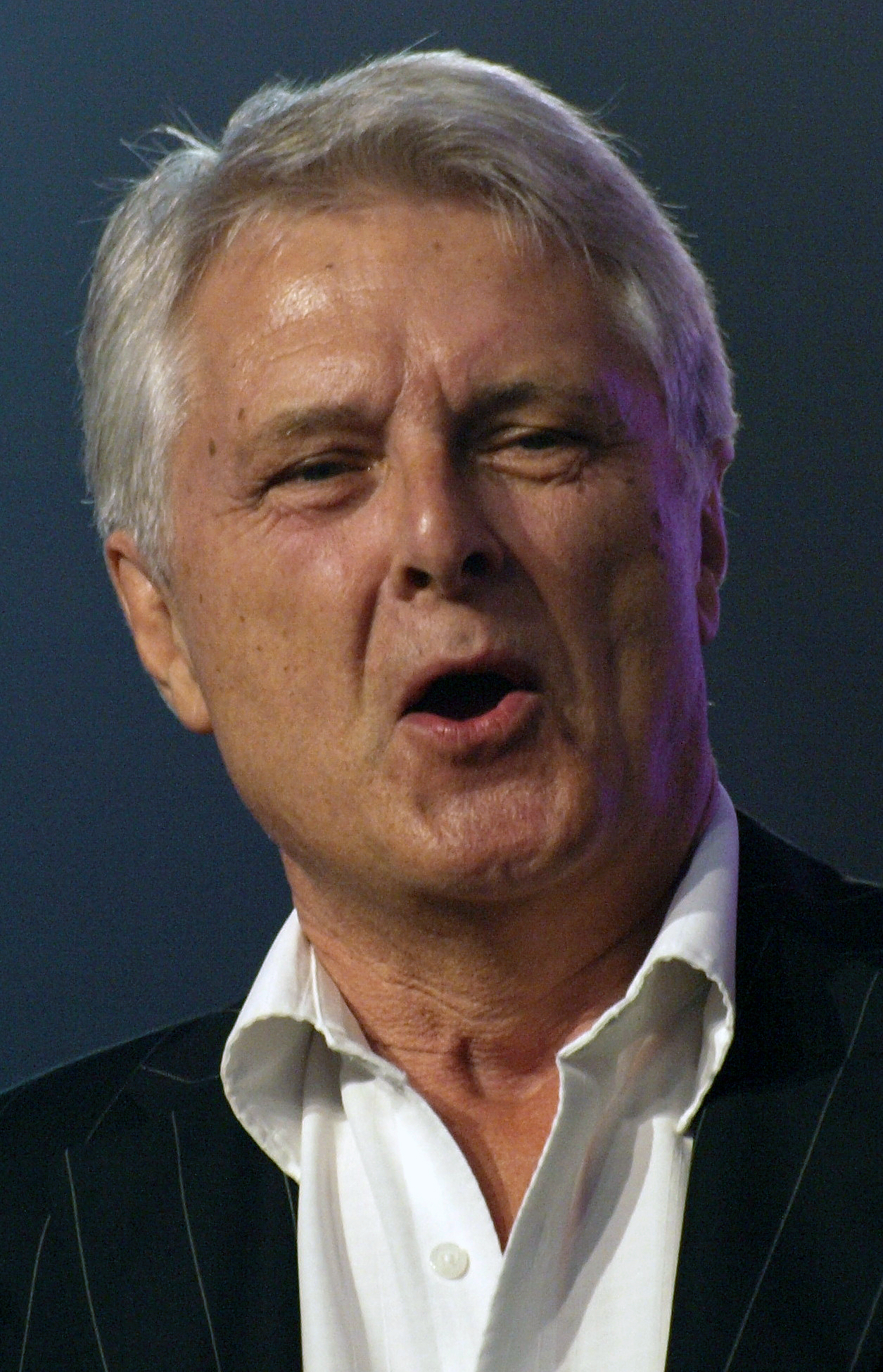
- Hederström in 2010

Background information
- Birth name: Claes-Göran Hederström
- Born: 20 October 1945; Danderyd, Sweden
- Died: 8 November 2022 (aged 77)
- Occupation: Singer
- Years active: 1967–2022
- Musical career
- Genres: Pop; schlager
- Instrument: Vocals

Claes-Göran Hederström (20 October 1945 – 8 November 2022) was a Swedish singer. He made his musical debut on Swedish television in 1967. In 1968 he represented Sweden in the Eurovision Song Contest with Det börjar verka kärlek, banne mej ("It's Beginning To Look Like Love, I'll Be Damned", English version named "My time has come") placing 5th. The song subsequently topped Swedish top 20 charts and today it is still his most recognised song.

Hederström died on 8 November 2022, at the age of 77.

Awards and achievements
Preceded by Östen Warnerbring with "Som en dröm"	Sweden in the Eurovision Song Contest; 1968	Succeeded by Tommy Körberg with "Judy, min vän"
