= Brendan O'Reilly =

Irish journalist and presenter (1929–2001)

- Born: 14 May 1929; Granard, County Longford, Ireland
- Died: 1 April 2001 (aged 71–72); Dublin, Ireland
- Education: University of Michigan
- Occupations: Sports broadcaster, journalist, actor, singer, songwriter (best known for 'The Ballad of Michael Collins' and the Olympic Song 'Let the Nations Play'
- Years active: 1962–1994
- Notable credit(s): The Life of O'Reilly; Sports Stadium, 'Flight of the Doves'. First non-political figure to give the annual Michael Collins oration at Beal na mBlath
- Spouse: DrJohanna Lowry O'Reilly
- Children: Hannah Lowry O'Reilly BL, Kelan (Lowry) O'Reilly, Rossa (Lowry) O'Reilly, Myles O'Reilly
- Sports career
- Sport: Athletics
- Event: high jump

Brendan O'Reilly (14 May 1929 – 1 April 2001) was an Irish Olympic athlete, broadcaster, journalist, actor, singer and songwriter (best known for the 'Ballad of Michael Collins' and the Olympic song, 'Let the Nations Play'. He is best known as presenter of the long-running Sports Stadium. Between 1966 and 1968, O'Reilly had the honour of commentating for Ireland at the Eurovision Song Contest, as well as presenting the National Song Contest (to select Ireland's Eurovision entry) from 1966 to 1970.

== Biography ==
=== Athletics career ===
O'Reilly studied in America at the University of Michigan and was a high jumper. He set the Irish high jump record and also set the Irish javelin record. He finished second behind Derek Cox in the high jump event at the British 1953 AAA Championships. The following year he claimed the title at the 1954 AAA Championships.

He represented Ireland at the 1956 Olympic Games in Melbourne.

=== Professional career ===
O'Reilly studying drama at the University of Michigan and acted in the 1971 film Flight of the Doves playing Police Inspector Michael Roark, and also played roles in After Midnight (1990) and the television series Mystic Knights of Tir Na Nog

He is survived by his wife Dr Johanna Lowry O'Reilly, historian and author, eldest son, musician and film maker Myles O'Reilly, restaurant general manager and musician Kelan (Lowry) O'Reilly, Dublin, Rossa (Lowry) O'Reilly, hospitality investment and Hannah Lowry BL.

Preceded by Bunny Carr	Eurovision Song Contest Ireland Commentator; 1966–1968	Succeeded by Gay Byrne
