= Jan Erik Berntsen =

Norwegian actor and singer (1944–2025)

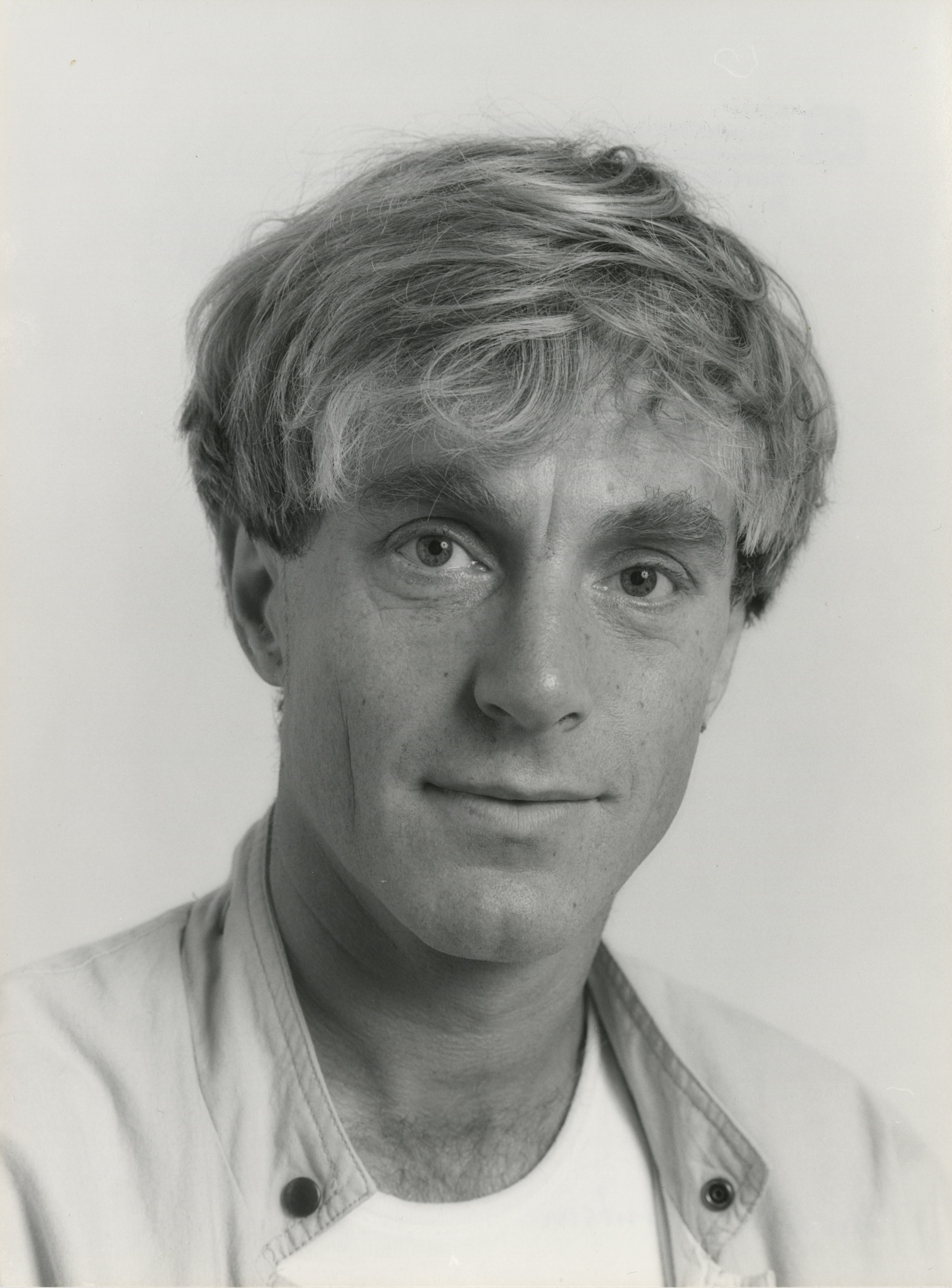
- Berntsen c. 1979
- Born: 24 December 1944; Lillehammer, Norway
- Died: 21 August 2025 (aged 80)
- Occupation(s): Actor, singer
- Spouse: Su'udah Berntsen (m. 2003)
- Children: 1

Jan Erik Berntsen (24 December 1944 – 21 August 2025) was a Norwegian actor and singer. He made his acting debut at Trøndelag Teater in 1964 and participated in over 130 productions at the theatre before retiring in 2014. At the Melodi Grand Prix 1971, he and Odd Børre performed "Ironside" and finished as runners-up.

== Early life ==
Berntsen was born on 24 December 1944 in Lillehammer. According to VG, Berntsen began performing in restaurants in Skien and Porsgrunn as a teenager. At 14, he sang as part of a travelling funfair, where his talent was noticed, and he was subsequently given the opportunity to perform at the 1958 Brussels World's Fair.

== Career ==
Berntsen trained as an actor at Trøndelag Teater's student school before making his acting debut in 1964. In December 1964, he released his debut single "Jeg vil komme når du ber meg", a Norwegian version of the Italian song "Una lacrima sul viso" on Jørg-Fr. Ellertsen's record company Troll Records. In 1968, he released his single "Bli her hos meg" on NorDisc. He starred in the 1970 NRK music program Nye ansikter (lit. '"New Faces"'), which showcased emerging singers.

Berntsen submitted two songs to the Melodi Grand Prix 1971: "Enkle ord", performed solo, which placed eleventh, and "Ironside", performed with Odd Børre, which came second. At the Melodi Grand Prix 1972, he sang "Et hus på landet" with Eli Tanja, which placed fifth.

In the 2006 stage adaptation of Anne B. Ragde's novel Berlinerpoplene, Berntsen played Krumme, the partner of Erlend (Øyvind Brandtzæg). In the 2008 stage adaption of its sequel Ligge i grønne enger, Krumme and Erlend plan to start a family with a lesbian couple. Berntsen noted that the characters helped to normalise same-sex relationships.

In 2014, Berntsen was honoured with a Christmas performance called JEB Show featuring guests from across his stage career. The show marked the end of his tenure as a permanent actor, during which he participated in over 130 productions at the Trøndelag Teater, though he continued to perform in productions such as The Sound of Music and I grevens tid.

== Personal life and death ==
Berntsen was married to prompter Gerd Aaker for seven years before they divorced. They had one son together called Jeppe Lund Aaker. Berntsen moved to Bali, Indonesia in 1998 where he lived with his partner Leif, a Swedish man who worked at a hospital in Trondheim. Berntsen ran an art gallery and was involved in supporting refugees in Timor. In Bali, he met Su'udah, a woman from Java, 30 years his junior. When Leif died, he returned to Norway with Su'udah on 1 August 2002. They married on 3 March 2003 and settled in Fagerlia, Trondheim with Su'udah working as a cleaner at the theatre.

Berntsen died on 21 August 2025, at the age of 80.
