= Ronnie Tober =

Dutch singer (born 1945)

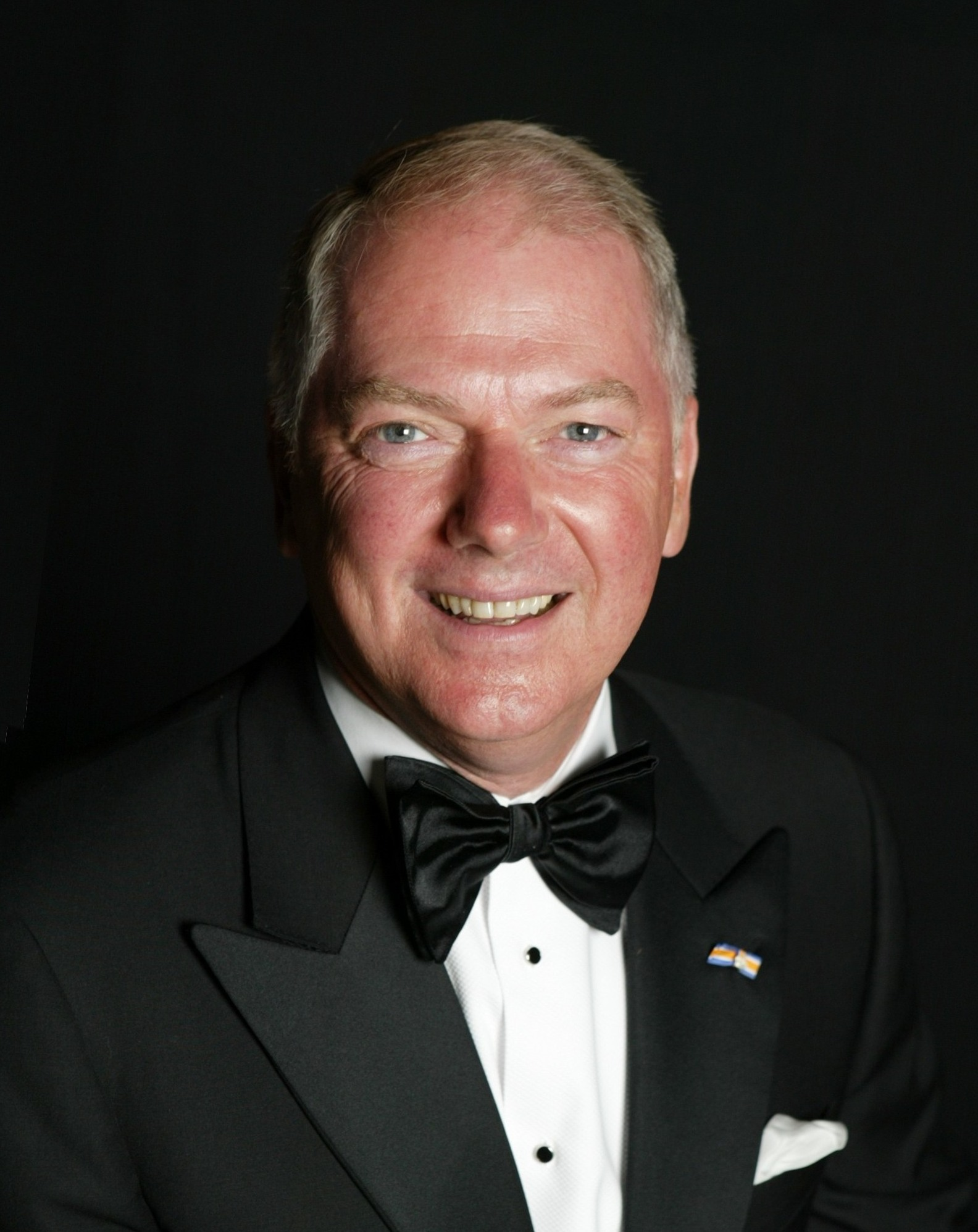

Background information
- Born: Ronald Edwin Tober; 21 April 1945 (age 81); Bussum, Netherlands
- Occupation: Singer

Ronald Edwin Tober (born 21 April 1945) is a Dutch singer, known for representing the Netherlands in the Eurovision Song Contest 1968 with the song "Morgen".

== Early life ==
Tober was born in Bussum, Netherlands, but moved to the United States with his family at the age of three. He grew up in Albany, New York.

== Career ==
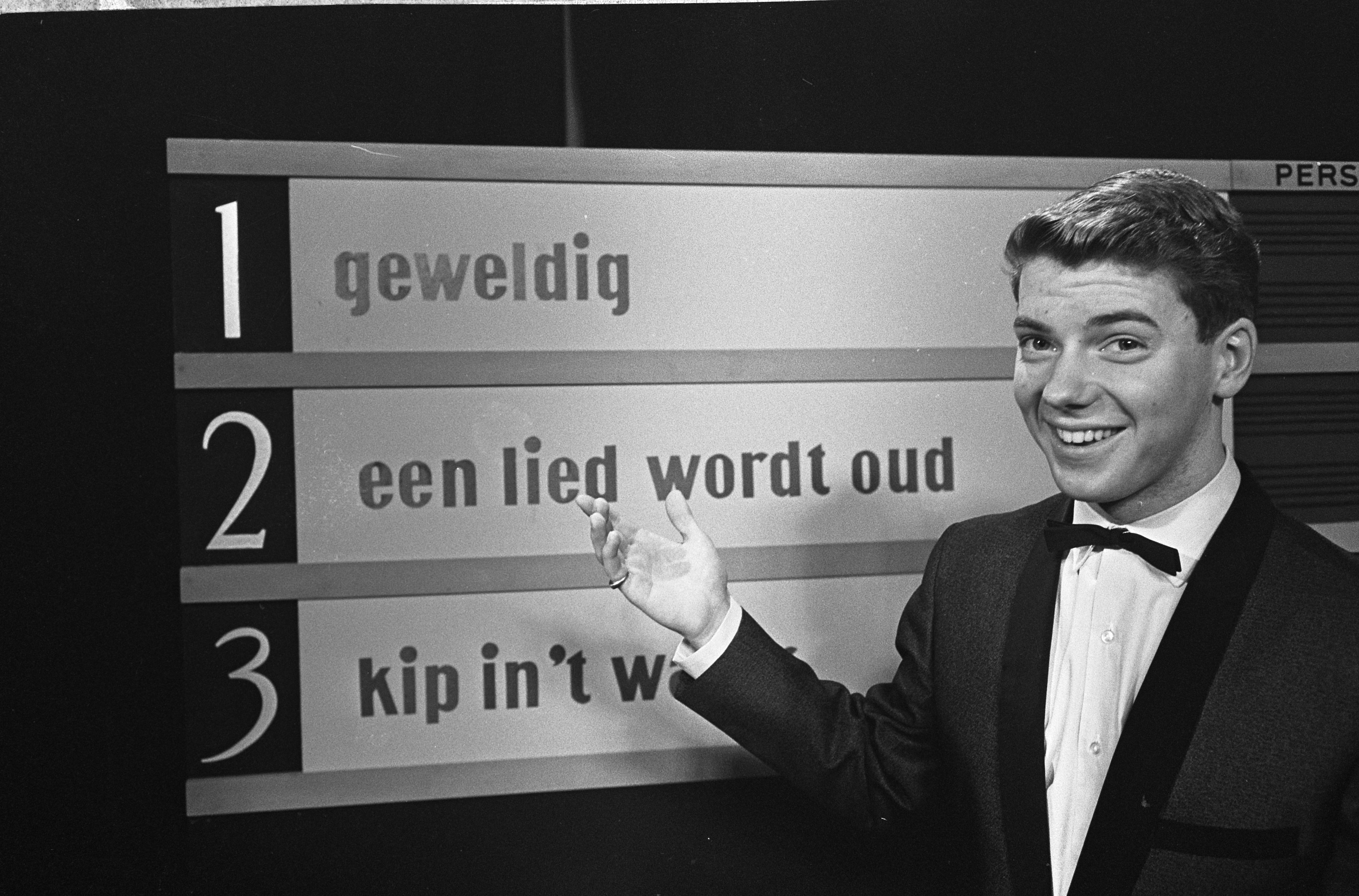
Tober in 1965

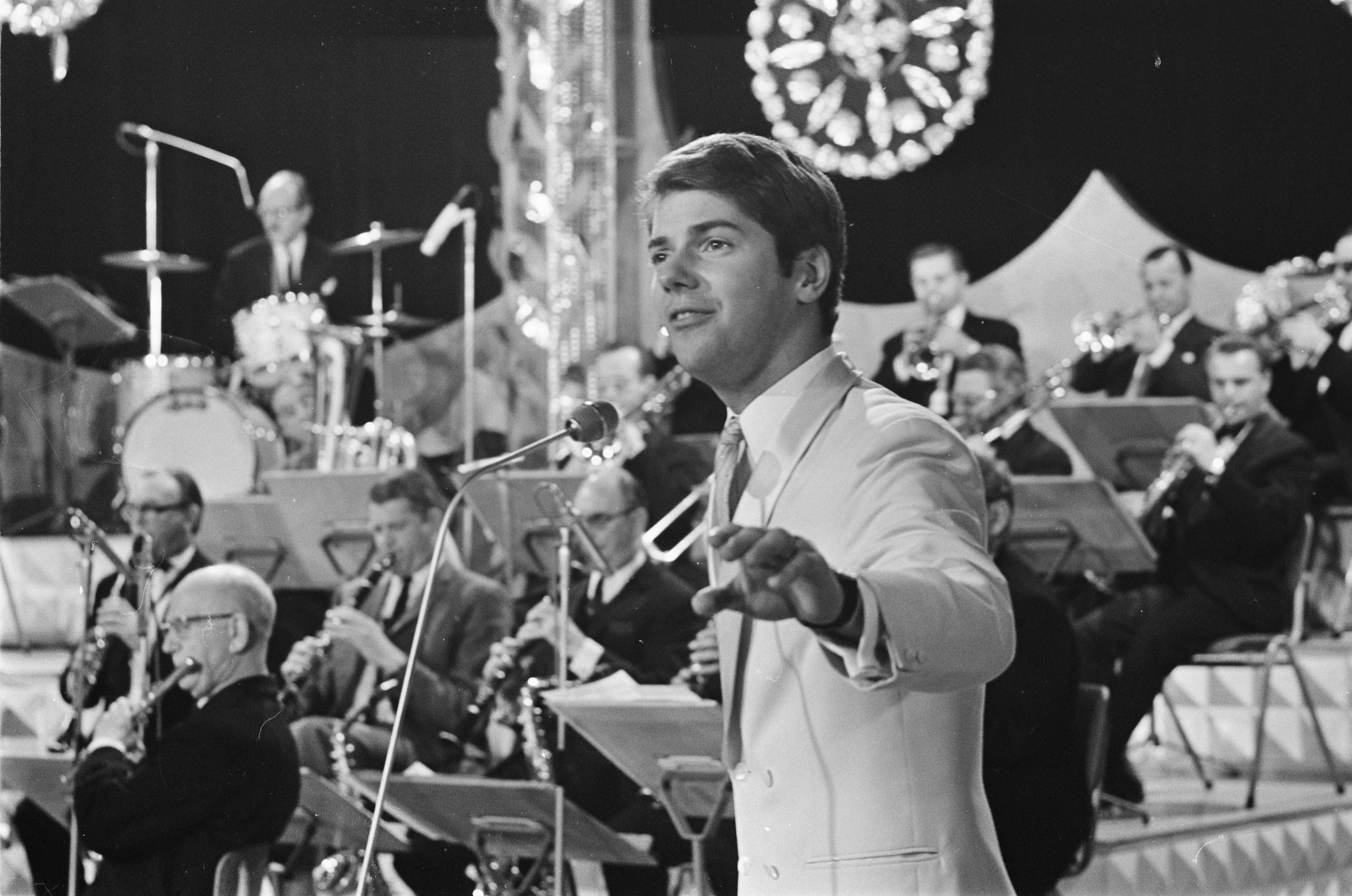
Tober at the Nationaal Songfestival in 1968

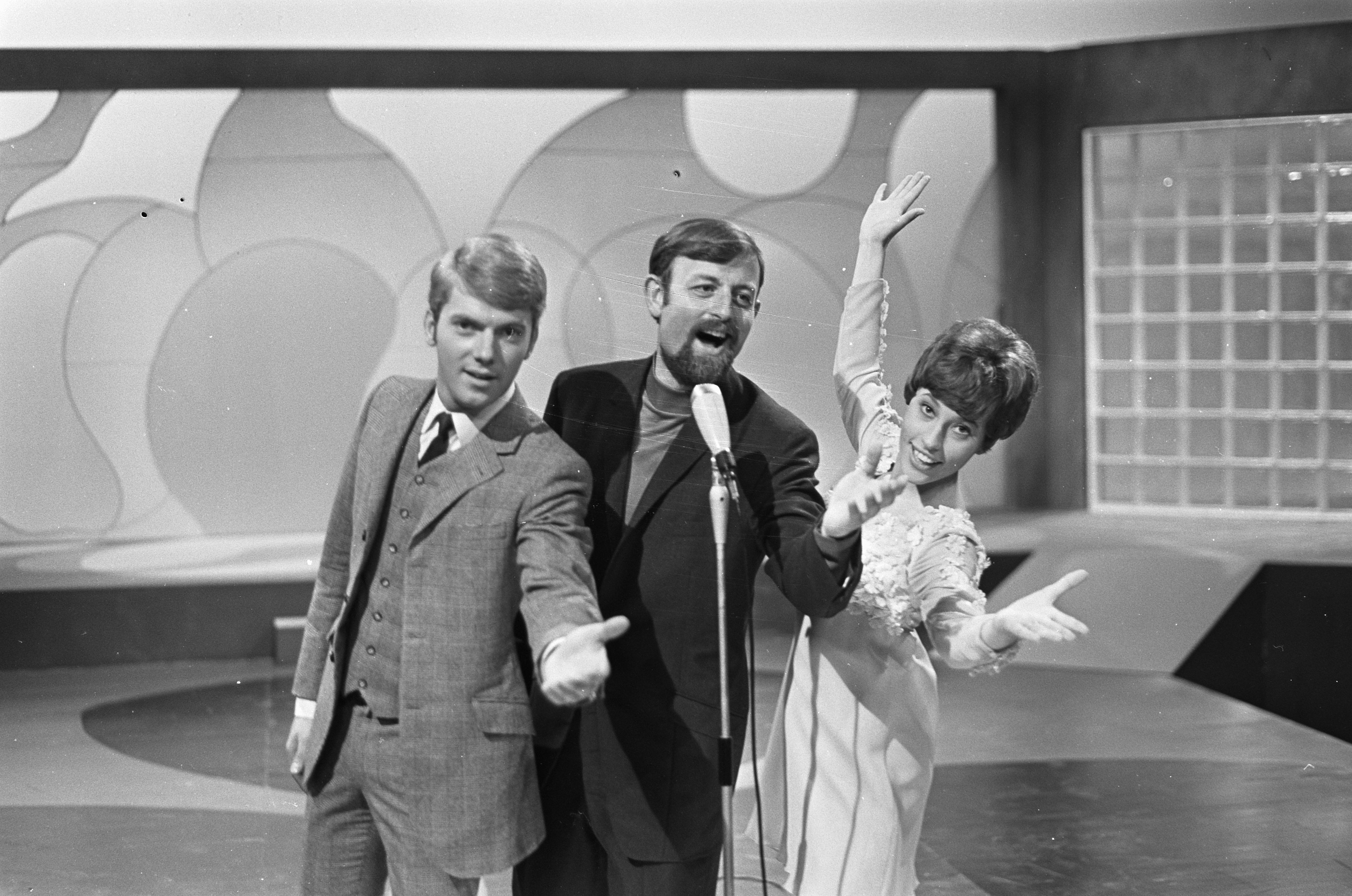
Ronnie Tober performing with Roger Whittaker and Tonia in 1968

=== Early career ===
Invited to appear on "The Teen Age Barn", a television show on the channel WRGB, he performed every week for several years. During this time, he appeared on television as a guest of singer Perry Como, performing "O Holy Night" together. He was also a guest star on the CBS series Route 66 with George Maharis and Martin Milner, and appeared on The Ed Sullivan Show.

Tober went on to perform for several notable people, including Senator John F. Kennedy, Vice-President Richard Nixon, and Governors W. Averell Harriman and Nelson Rockefeller.

Tober played the role of Tony in the musical The Boy Friend and Billy Jester in Little Mary Sunshine. After being introduced to songwriter and record producer Bob Crewe, Tober recorded his first record in 1959 entitled "Who Taught You How To Love".

=== Return to the Netherlands ===
In 1963, while in the Netherlands to visit his grandmother, he appeared on Voor de vuist weg, a television show hosted by Willem Duys. Based on the positive reactions to his performance, he decided to move back to the Netherlands. He signed with Phonogram/Philips and produced his first Dutch record "Iedere avond" in 1964.

In 1966, he participated in the Sopot International Song Festival in Sopot, Poland, with the medley "Showtime on Broadway".

In 1968, he won the Dutch national selection for the Eurovision Song Contest and represented the Netherlands in the Eurovision Song Contest 1968 held in London, England, with the song "Morgen". He finished in sixteenth place with only one point.

Tober has had TV shows with the broadcasting organizations AVRO and KRO, and his guests have included Vikki Carr, Roger Whittaker and Nancy Wilson.

== Personal life ==
Tober married Jan Jochems, who he had been in a relationship with since 1968, on 24 February 1998. In 1999, Tober was diagnosed with bladder cancer and underwent chemotherapy.

On 27 December 2003, during his 40th year in show business, Tober was invested as a Knight of the Order of Orange-Nassau by Queen Beatrix of the Netherlands. Tober's name is also inscribed on the Wall of Fame in the Zuiderkerk in Amsterdam.

=== Philanthropy ===
In 2002, Tober founded the Ronnie Tober Foundation to help assist people with a developmental disability through cultural and musical works. In 2007, Tober, his husband, and their friends raised €10,000 for his foundation by completing the International Four Days Marches Nijmegen.

== Discography ==
- Who Taught You How To Love – 1959
- Iedere Avond – 1964
- Al Jolson Hits − 1965
- Geweldig − 1965
- Geweldig/Iedere Avond − 1965
- Marijke Uit Krabbendijke – 1965
- Verboden Vruchten – 1965
- Wat Was Jouw Bedoeling – 1965
- The Ronnie Tober Show – 1965
- Tunes van Toen – 1965
- Merci Cherie – 1966
- More Than Love – 1966
- Niets Dan Zorgen Geeft Zij Mij – 1966
- Zij Draagt Mijn Naam – 1966
- De Beste van Ronnie Tober – 1966
- Sopot 1966 – 1966
- Onbereikbaar Ver – 1967
- Put Your Head on My Shoulder – 1967
- Alleluja No. 1 – 1968
- Mexico – 1968
- Morgen – 1968
- Someday – 1968
- Ronnie's Songparade – 1968
- Ronnie's Songparade 2 – 1968
- Arrivederci Ans – 1969
- M'n Papegaai – 1969
- Wiederseh'n – 1969
- Waar Zijn de Dagen – 1969
- Ronnie Tober Successen – 1969
- Christina – 1970
- Carmen – 1971
- Laat Me Niet Alleen – 1971
- Voor Sandra – 1971
- Kerstfeest Met Ronnie Tober – 1971
- Een Vuist Vol Hollandse Hits! – 1971
- Alle 13 Goed deel 1 – 1971
- Met Een Roos in Je Blonde Haren – 1972
- Joseph, Joseph – 1972
- Petite Mademoiselle – 1972
- Ronnie & Gonnie – Met liedjes het land in – 1972
- Alweer Alle 13 Goed – 1972
- Het Beste Uit...Muziek in uw Straatje – 1972
- Gitte, Bitte – 1973
- Petites Mesdemoiselles – 1973
- Yesterdays Dreams – 1973
- Hollands Kwartet – 1973
- Vol Met Super! deel 1–1973
- Een Witte Eend – 1974
- Mama Weet Wat Goed Is – 1974
- Koelewijk Behoeft Geen Frans – 1974
- Met Vlag en Wimpel! – 1974
- Prima! Prima! – 1974
- Alleen – 1975
- Een Heel Gelukkig Kerstfeest – 1975
- Een Witte Eend – 1975
- Naar de Kermis – 1975
- Petite Mademoiselle – 1975
- Alle 13 Goed! deel 8 – 1975
- Liedjes van Johnny Holshuysen – 1975
- Tanz Mit Mir Samba Margarita – 1976
- Pootje Baaien – 1977
- Rosemarie – 1977
- Speel Nog Een Liedje Orgelman – 1977
- Dat Was 'n Kus – 1978
- 15 Jaar Ronnie Tober – 1978
- De Zon in M'n Hart – 1979
- Glory Glory Halleluja – 1979
- You Are My Sunshine – 1979
- Love me with all of your heart – 1980
- De Zon in M'n Hart – 1980
- Ik Ben Zo Eenzaam Zonder Jou – 1981
- Dubbel Goud – 1981
- Christmas Around The World – 1981
- Olé Espana – 1982
- Zomer, Zon en Witte Stranden – 1983
- Leven Met Jou – 1986
- Afscheid Nemen Doet Pijn – 1987
- Lolita – 1987
- De Nacht Van M'n Dromen – 1988
- Holland Amerika Story – 1988
- Voor Altijd en Eeuwig – 1988
- 25 Jaar Ronnie Tober – 1988
- Zilver – 1988
- 4 Gouden Hits – 1989
- Morgen Schijnt de Zon Voor Jou – 1989
- Jij Bent 't Helemaal – 1990
- Zoals ik ben – 1990
- 'n Lange Hete Zomer – 1991
- Ronnie Tober & Gonnie Baars – 28 Populaire Liedjes – 1991
- Ronnie Tober Nu – 2008
- Ronnie Tober & Willeke D'estell – Kom in m'n armen – 2010
- Ronnie Tober & Willeke D'estell – De zomer komt weer gauw – 2011
- De Mooiste Duetten Aller Tijden – 2011
- Terug in de Tijd – 2011
- Er is niemand zoals jij – 2012
- Ronnie Tober & Belinda Kinnaer – Het zijn van die kleine dingen – 2012
- Marco de Hollander & Ronnie Tober – Twee artiesten, hand in hand – 2012
- Kom in mijn armen vannacht – 2012
- Altijd – 2012
- Dank U Majesteit – 2013
- Duet with René Riva
- Majesteit, ik vind u geweldig – 2013
- Van Toen naar het Heden – 2013
- Duet with Edwin van Hoevelaak
- Ronnie Tober & Friends – 2013
- Ronnie Tober & Belinda Kinnaer – Geluk − 2014
- Vaarwel, Adios... – 2015

== Other information ==
In the Dutch army, one of the standard bags is called a ROTOTA (Ronnie Tober Tasje). In an instruction-video from 2014 Ronnie Tober can be seen claiming this bag.

Awards and achievements
Preceded by Thérèse Steinmetz with "Ring-dinge-ding"	Netherlands in the Eurovision Song Contest; 1968	Succeeded by Lenny Kuhr with "De troubadour"
