= Portugal in the Eurovision Song Contest 1968 =

- Eurovision Song Contest 1968
- Participating broadcaster: Radiotelevisão Portuguesa (RTP)
- Country: Portugal
- Selection process: Grande Prémio TV da Canção Portuguesa 1968
- Selection date: 4 March 1968

Competing entry
- Song: "Verão"
- Artist: Carlos Mendes
- Songwriters: Pedro Vaz Osório; José Alberto Diogo

Placement
- Final result: 11th, 5 points

Participation chronology

Portugal was represented at the Eurovision Song Contest 1968 with the song "Verão", composed by Pedro Vaz Osório, with lyrics by José Alberto Diogo, and performed by Carlos Mendes. The Portuguese participating broadcaster, Radiotelevisão Portuguesa (RTP), selected its entry at the Grande Prémio TV da Canção Portuguesa 1968.

== Before Eurovision ==
=== Grande Prémio TV da Canção Portuguesa 1968 ===
Radiotelevisão Portuguesa (RTP) held the Grande Prémio TV da Canção Portuguesa 1968 at its Lumiar studios in Lisbon on 4 March 1968, hosted by Maria Fernanda and Henrique Mendes. Unlike the previous year, no semi-finals where held, returning to the single-night model. Ten songs took part in the final. During the interpretation of her second theme, Simone de Oliveira felt sick and was unable to complete it, being removed from the stage to receive medical attention. Joaquim Luís Gomes conducted all the songs. The results were determined by a distrital jury, composed of three members which each had 5 votes to be distributed among the songs it intended to award, making a total of 15 votes per district.

Grande Prémio TV da Canção Portuguesa - 4 March 1968
R/O	Artist	Song	Votes	Place
1	Mirene Cardinalli	"Vento não vou contigo"	11	8
2	Tonicha	"Fui ter com a madrugada"	59	2
3	Nicolau Breyner	"Pouco mais"	33	4
4	João Maria Tudela	"Ao vento e às andorinhas"	24	5
5	Carlos Mendes	"Verão"	61	1
6	José Cid	"Balada para D. Inês"	43	3
7	António Calvário	"O nosso mundo"	2	10
8	Tonicha	"Calendário"	12	7
9	Simone de Oliveira	"Dentro de outro mundo"	11	8
10	Simone de Oliveira	"Canção ao meu piano velho"	14	6

Detailed Distrital Jury Votes
R/O	Song	Aveiro	Beja	Braga	Bragança	Castelo Branco	Coimbra	Évora	Faro	Guarda	Leiria	Lisbon	Portalegre	Porto	Santarém	Setúbal	Viana do Castelo	Vila Real	Viseu	Total
1	"Vento não vou contigo"			1			5					1	1		1			1	1	11
2	"Fui ter com a madrugada"	7		9	2	8		4	2	10	13				1			3		59
3	"Pouco mais"	2	5		3		1	8	2	1				2			5	3	1	33
4	"Ao vento e às andorinhas"	2		1	1	2				2	2				1	4		3	6	24
5	"Verão"		1	4	5	4	2		5	1		9	7	8	3	4		1	7	61
6	"Balada para D. Inês"	2			1	1	2		5			5		5	7	5	10			43
7	"O nosso mundo"									1								1		2
8	"Calendário"	1	9															2		12
9	"Dentro de outro mundo"				3			3					5							11
10	"Canção ao meu piano velho"	1					5		1				2		2	2		1		14

== At Eurovision ==
On the night of the final Mendes performed 1st in the running order, preceding Netherlands. At the close of the voting the song had received 5 points, coming 11th in the field of 17 competing countries.

The orchestra during the Portuguese entry was conducted by Joaqium Luis Gomes.

The national jury which awarded the points from Portugal comprised Maria Helena Oliveira Simões (housewife), Madalena Iglésias (singer), Maria João Aguiar (TV and radio presenter), Isabel Maria Spencer Vieira Martins (college student), António Reis (publishing director), José Joaquim Machado Leite (office secretary), António Moniz Pereira (member of the group Quarteto 1111), Bernardo Manuel Palma Mira Delgado (mechanical engineer), Luís Fernando Cardoso Nandim de Carvalho (university student), and Pedro Manuel Mota Vaz do Castelo (radio presenter).

=== Voting ===
Points awarded to Portugal
Score	Country
3 points	Spain
2 points	Norway

Points awarded by Portugal
Score	Country
4 points	Spain
1 point	Belgium; Ireland; Italy; Sweden; United Kingdom; Yugoslavia
