= Odd Børre =

Norwegian singer (1939–2023)

Background information
- Born: Odd Børre Sørensen; 9 August 1939; Harstad, Norway
- Died: 28 January 2023 (aged 83)
- Genres: Pop
- Instrument: Solo singer
- Years active: 1962–1970
- Formerly of: Kjell Karlsen's Orchestra

Odd Børre Sørensen (9 August 1939 – 28 January 2023) was a Norwegian pop singer. Internationally, he is best known for the song "Stress", which he performed in the 1968 Eurovision Song Contest. He sang in Kjell Karlsen's Orchestra (1962–70) and was releasing singles during that period. He retired from full-time professional singing in 1970 and became an insurance company agent (although he did perform in the Norwegian national finals in 1971 and 1977 and was one of the judges in the 1978 final). After retiring in the early 2000s, Odd Børre teamed up again with Kjell Karlsen and performed with him.

Børre died on 28 January 2023, at the age of 83.

== Melodi Grand Prix entries ==
Year	Song	Placing in national final	Placing in the Eurovision song contest
1964	"La meg være ung" *	3rd	
1968	"Stress"	2nd	13th
1968	"Jeg har aldri vært så glad i noen som deg" **	1st	
1969	"Lena"	2nd	
1971	"Ironside" ***	2nd	
1977	"Make love, not war"	6th	

- * Odd Børre & The Cannons
- ** The winner, which was written by Kari Nergaard, was accused of being a copy of Cliff Richard's "Summer Holiday"" and it was withdrawn prior to NRK investigating the accusations. The second-place song "Stress" was substituted.
- *** Along with Jan Erik Berntsen

Awards and achievements
Preceded by Kirsti Sparboe with "Dukkemann"	Norway in the Eurovision Song Contest; 1968	Succeeded by Kirsti Sparboe with "Oj, oj, oj, så glad jeg skal bli"
