= Pat McGuigan =

Irish singer (1935–1987)

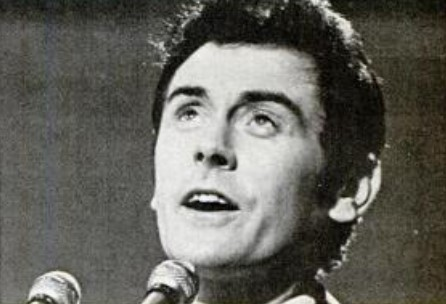

Background information
- Born: Patrick McGuigan; 10 February 1935; Clones, County Monaghan
- Died: 27 June 1987 (aged 52)
- Occupation: Singer
- Instrument: Vocals

Patrick McGuigan (10 February 1935 – 27 June 1987) was an Irish singer from Clones, County Monaghan. McGuigan, who spelled his name McGeegan for the stage, first came to prominence in Ireland when his single with the Big Four reached number 7 in the Irish charts in 1963. Five years later he was again in the spotlight when he competed (as Pat McGeegan) for Ireland at the Eurovision Song Contest in London on 6 April 1968. His song Chance of a Lifetime came fourth. The song spent one week at no. 1 in the Irish Singles Chart in April 1968. Subsequently, he made some albums and released many singles, but never reached the Irish top twenty again. McGuigan was also a songwriter.

His son, Barry, was world featherweight boxing champion in 1985–1986. Pat McGuigan became known in the United States after his son's world title winning victory over Eusebio Pedroza. On 13 June 1986, he sang the American national anthem before the world championship bout between Carlos Santos and Buster Drayton in New Jersey. His rendition of Danny Boy when his son fought became well known.

Pat McGuigan died after a period of illness in 1987. He was 52 years old.

Awards and achievements
Preceded by Sean Dunphy with "If I Could Choose"	Ireland in the Eurovision Song Contest; 1968	Succeeded by Muriel Day with "The Wages of Love"
