= Đelo Jusić =

Croatian musician (1939–2019)

- Also known as: Đelo
- Born: 26 January 1939; Dubrovnik, Littoral Banovina, Kingdom of Yugoslavia
- Died: 31 May 2019 (aged 80) Zagreb, Croatia
- Occupations: composer; arranger; conductor; guitarist

Đelo Jusić (born 26 January 1939 – 31 May 2019) was a Croatian composer, arranger, conductor and guitarist.

Jusić was born in Dubrovnik and began composing in the 1960s, founding the successful band Dubrovački trubaduri. His musical works drew inspiration from his native town and contributed significantly to the Mediterranean circle of Croatian popular music. He was a winner of the 2007 Porin Lifetime Achievement Award.

His children, Dubravka Jusić, is also a Croatian pop star and Đelo Jr. Jusić is composer and producer

He died on 31 May 2019 in Zagreb, at the age of 80.
