= Kirsti Sparboe =

Norwegian singer and actress (1946–2026)

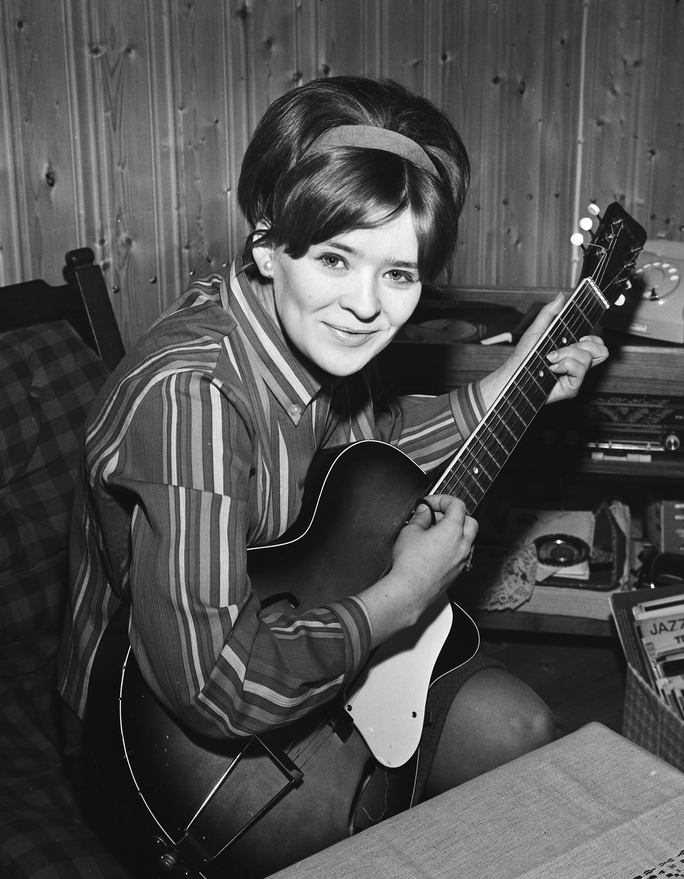
- Sparboe in 1967
- Born: 7 December 1946; Tromsø, Norway
- Died: 19 June 2026 (aged 79)
- Occupations: Singer; actress
- Years active: 1964–2026
- Spouses: Stein Nordtvedt (m. 1966; div. 1968); Benny Borg (m. 1972; div. 1978); Terje Dahl (m. 1989; died 2017)
- Children: 1
- Awards: Spellemannprisen for Female Artist of the Year (1972)

Kirsti Sparboe (7 December 1946 – 19 June 2026) was a Norwegian singer and actress. Most of her musical career was built upon participation in the Eurovision Song Contest, in which she competed three times and scored a total of four points.

== Life and career ==
Kirsti Sparboe was born on 7 December 1946 in Tromsø, Norway. She first participated in the Eurovision Song Contest in 1965 when she was 18, with the song "Karusell", which came in 13th place. She then participated in the 1966 Norwegian pre-selection for the Eurovision Song Contest, with the song "Gi Meg Fri", which came in second. In 1967, her song "Dukkemann" won the pre-selection, and came in 14th place in Eurovision.

She also participated in the 1968 Norwegian pre-selection, and would have gone on to represent Norway in 1968, but the song she performed ("Jag har aldri vært så glad i no'en som deg") was disqualified after there were accusations that it was a plagiarism of a popular Cliff Richard song called "Summer Holiday". She also covered the winning song of that year, Spain's "La La La", in Norwegian.

Sparboe represented Norway once more in 1969 with the song "Oj, oj, oj, så glad jeg skal bli", which finished in last place. This song was recorded in four languages (Norwegian, Swedish, German, and French), and years later a "Grand Jubilee" version entitled "Oj Oj Oj, Grand Prix Jubilee", was released.

She participated in the 1970 German selection for the Eurovision Song Contest after Norway, Finland, Portugal, and Sweden refused to participate for that year. She sang "Pierre Der Clochard", and ended in fourth place. Sparboe also covered 1971's winning song "Un Banc, Un Arbre, Une Rue" in Norwegian, and also 1970's winning song, "All Kinds of Everything", in Swedish and Norwegian.

She would later try to represent Norway in the Eurovision Song Contest 1974 as part of the group Kjersti & Kirsti with the song "Yo-Yo" and in the Eurovision Song Contest 1977 with the song "Sang" along with Benny Borg, who was her husband at the time.

After the Eurovision Song Contest, she released singles mostly in Germany, where she found moderate success. She also showed off her acting talents for a one-off BBC TV Show, Jon, Brian, Kirsti And Jon, in 1980.

Sparboe died on 19 June 2026, at the age of 79.

== Other sources ==
- Short Bio of Kirsti Sparboe in German
- Archived Eurovision National Finals 1956–1969
- BBC Comedy Guide - "Jon, Brian, Kirsti And Jon"

Awards and achievements
Preceded by Arne Bendiksen with "Spiral"	Norway in the Eurovision Song Contest; 1965	Succeeded by Åse Kleveland with "Intet er nytt under solen"
Preceded by Åse Kleveland with "Intet er nytt under solen"	Norway in the Eurovision Song Contest; 1967	Succeeded by Odd Børre with "Stress"
Preceded by Odd Børre with "Stress"	Norway in the Eurovision Song Contest; 1969	Succeeded by Hanne Krogh with "Lykken er"
