= Eurovision Song Contest 1973 =

International song competition

Date and venue
- Final: 7 April 1973
- Venue: Nouveau Théâtre; Luxembourg City, Luxembourg

Organisation
- Organiser: European Broadcasting Union (EBU)
- Scrutineer: Clifford Brown

Production
- Host broadcaster: Compagnie Luxembourgeoise de Télédiffusion (CLT)
- Producer: Paul Ulveling
- Director: René Steichen
- Musical director: Pierre Cao
- Presenter: Helga Guitton

Participants
- Number of entries: 17
- Debuting countries: Israel
- Non-returning countries: Austria; Malta
- Participation map: Competing countries Countries that participated in the past but not in 1973

Vote
- Voting system: Two-member juries from each country; each juror scored each song between one and five
- Winning song: Luxembourg "Tu te reconnaîtras"

The Eurovision Song Contest 1973 was the 18th edition of the Eurovision Song Contest, held on 7 April 1973 at the Nouveau Théâtre in Luxembourg City, Luxembourg, and presented by Helga Guitton. It was organised by the European Broadcasting Union (EBU) and host broadcaster Compagnie Luxembourgeoise de Télédiffusion (CLT), who staged the event after winning the 1972 contest for Luxembourg with the song "Après toi" by Vicky Leandros.

Broadcasters from a total of eighteen countries signed up to enter the contest, with Israel competing for the first time, while Austria pulled out after taking part in 1972 due to disputes between the broadcaster Österreichischer Rundfunk (ORF) and Austrian record labels. However Malta's planned participation ultimately failed to materialise, after the Maltese Broadcasting Authority (MBA) deemed the quality of the songs that it had received of too low quality, leaving seventeen countries to participate.

The winner was Luxembourg, represented by the song "Tu te reconnaîtras", composed by Claude Morgan, with lyrics by Vline Buggy, and performed by Anne-Marie David. This was Luxembourg's fourth contest victory, matching the record number of contest wins previously set by France, and marked the second time that a country had won the contest two years in succession, previously set by Spain in 1969. Spain, the United Kingdom, Israel, and Sweden rounded out the top five positions, with Israel achieving the best performance for a debut nation since 1957.

With 129 votes out of a possible maximum score of 160, "Tu te reconnaîtras" remains as of 2026 the best-ever scoring song when compared to the potential maximum available, receiving 80.63% of the maximum vote.

== Location ==
Nouveau Théâtre, Luxembourg City – host venue of the 1973 contest

The 1973 contest took place in Luxembourg City, Luxembourg, following the country's victory at the 1972 contest with the song "Après toi" performed by Vicky Leandros. It was the third time that the event was hosted in Luxembourg, following the contests held in 1962 and 1966.

Within days of winning the 1972 contest the Luxembourgish broadcaster Compagnie Luxembourgeoise de Télédiffusion (CLT) had confirmed its intent to stage the event. CLT proposed the Nouveau Théâtre (also known as the Grand Théâtre or Théâtre Municipal), an arts venue inaugurated in 1964, as the venue and suggested either 28 April or 5 May 1973 as the date of the event, the latest calendar dates proposed for the contest since its first edition in 1956. A revised date of 7 April was subsequently accepted by the European Broadcasting Union (EBU), and announced during the 1972 edition of the Rose d'Or festival in Montreux, Switzerland. The venue's usual capacity of 800 seats was reduced by about 100 to allow space for technical equipment.

== Participants ==
Eurovision Song Contest 1973 – Participation summaries by country
- Belgium; Finland; France; Germany; Ireland; Israel; Italy; Luxembourg; ~~Malta~~; Monaco; Netherlands; Norway; Portugal; Spain; Sweden; Switzerland; United Kingdom; Yugoslavia

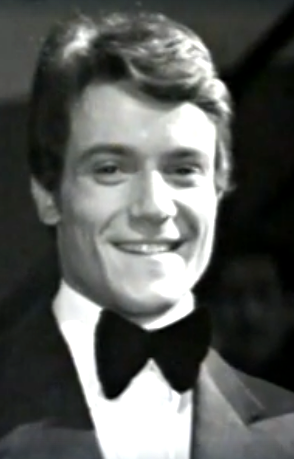
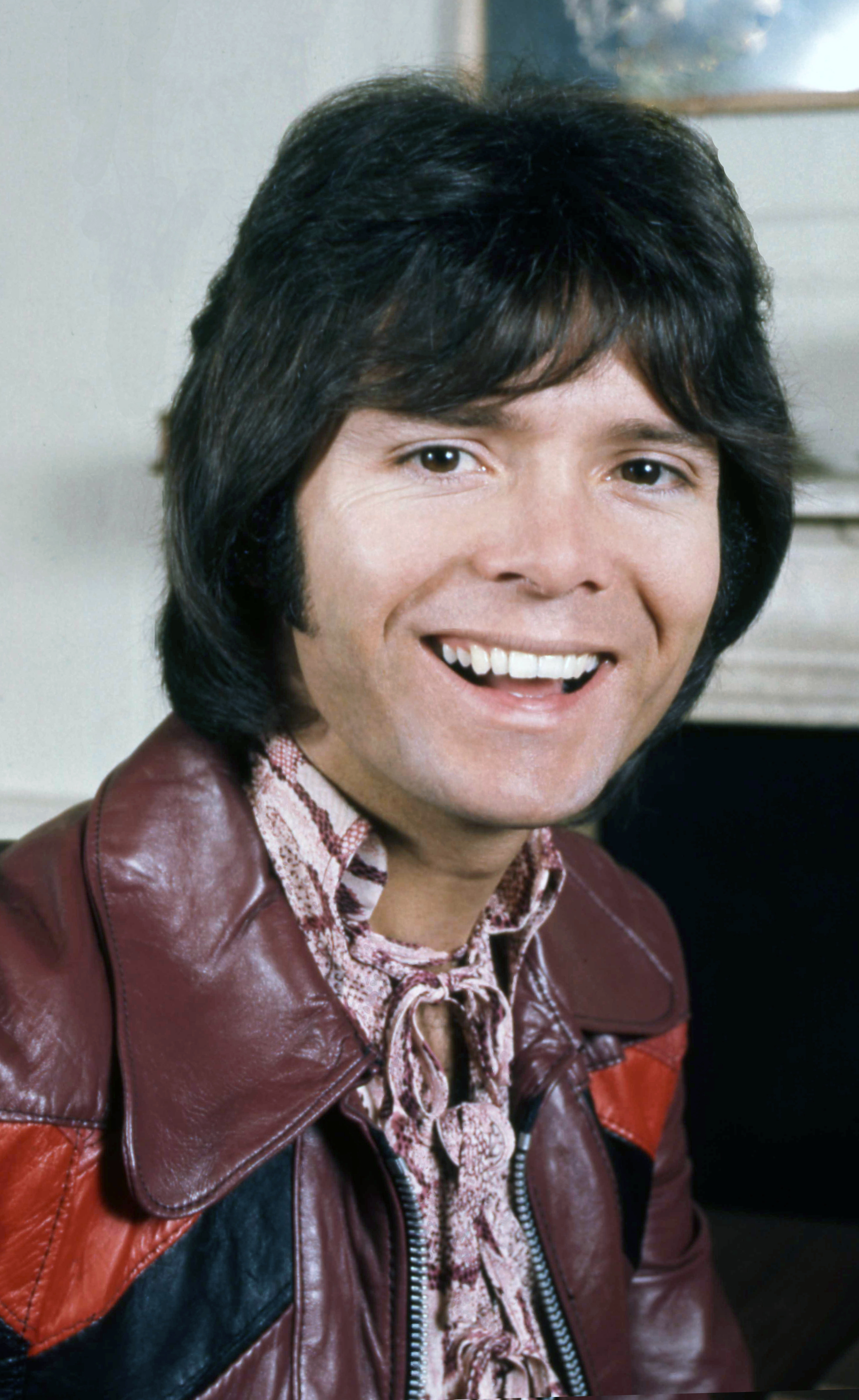
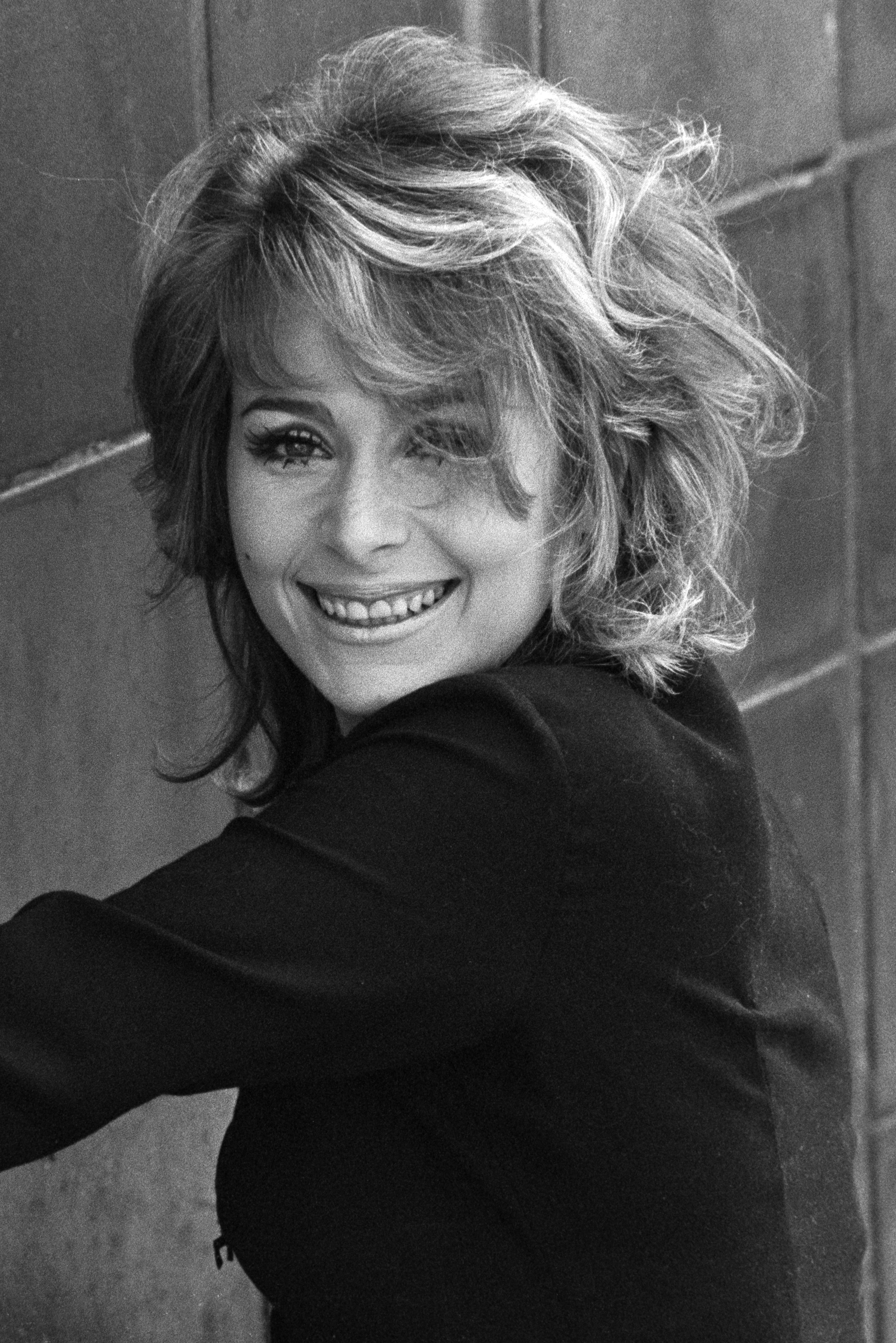
Massimo Ranieri, Cliff Richard, and Marion Rung respectively represented Italy, the United Kingdom, and Finland, each for a second time

Broadcasters from a total of eighteen countries initially signed up for the 1973 event. Seventeen of the eighteen which had participated in 1972 were set to return – with Austria being the only absence – and were joined by Israel in its contest debut. The Israel Broadcasting Authority (IBA), which was eligible to participate as a member of the EBU, became the first broadcaster to enter the contest representing a non-European country. The Austrian broadcaster, Österreichischer Rundfunk (ORF), refused to send an entry, reportedly due to disputes between its head of entertainment and Austrian record labels. In October 1972 the Greek broadcaster, the National Radio Television Foundation (EIRT), also enquired about entering the contest, however this was past the EBU's cut-off date; it would ultimately enter for the first time at the following year's event. Malta was among the eighteen countries initially scheduled to compete, however the Maltese Broadcasting Authority (MBA) withdrew its planned participation at a late stage, considering the standard of songs that it had received to be of too low quality for the contest; this left seventeen countries in the contest.

Three artists who had previously competed in the contest returned to represent their countries again: Marion Rung who had represented Finland in 1962, Cliff Richard who had represented the United Kingdom in 1968, and Massimo Ranieri who had represented Italy in 1971, appeared in the contest for the second time. Additionally, Nicole and Hugo had originally been selected to represent Belgium in 1971, however the duo were replaced after Nicole contracted jaundice; among the Belgian duo's 1973 backing singers was Claude Lombard, who had represented the nation in 1968. Sweden's group had originally performed in the Swedish selection, Melodifestivalen 1973, as Malta; however to avoid confusion with the country, the group performed at Eurovision as "the Nova". Monica Dominique was the first female conductor in the contest's history when she led the orchestra during the Swedish entry; she was shortly followed by the second female conductor, Nurit Hirsh for Israel, a few songs later.

Eurovision Song Contest 1973 participants
Country	Broadcaster	Artist	Song	Language	Songwriter(s)	Conductor
Belgium	BRT	Nicole and Hugo	"Baby Baby"	Dutch	Ignace Baert; Erik Marijsse	Francis Bay
Finland	YLE	Marion Rung	"Tom Tom Tom"	English	Bob Barratt; Rauno Lehtinen	Ossi Runne
France	ORTF	Martine Clémenceau	"Sans toi"	French	Anne Grégory; Paul Koulak	Jean Claudric
Germany	HR (Note: On behalf of the German public broadcasting consortium ARD)	Gitte	"Junger Tag"	German	Stephan Lego; Günther-Eric Thöner	Günther-Eric Thöner
Ireland	RTÉ	Maxi	"Do I Dream"	English	Jack Brierley; George F. Crosby	Colman Pearce
Israel	IBA	Ilanit	"Ey Sham" (אי שם)	Hebrew	Nurit Hirsh; Ehud Manor	Nurit Hirsh
Italy	RAI	Massimo Ranieri	"Chi sarà con te"	Italian	Giancarlo Bigazzi; Enrico Polito; Gaetano Savio	Enrico Polito
Luxembourg	CLT	Anne-Marie David	"Tu te reconnaîtras"	French	Vline Buggy; Claude Morgan	Pierre Cao
Monaco	TMC	Marie	"Un train qui part"	French	Boris Bergman; Bernard Liamis	Jean-Claude Vannier
Netherlands	NOS	Ben Cramer	"De oude muzikant"	Dutch	Pierre Kartner	Harry van Hoof
Norway	NRK	Bendik Singers	"It's Just a Game"	English, French	Arne Bendiksen; Bob Williams	Carsten Klouman
Portugal	RTP	Fernando Tordo	"Tourada"	Portuguese	José Carlos Ary dos Santos; Fernando Tordo	Jorge Costa Pinto
Spain	TVE	Mocedades	"Eres tú"	Spanish	Juan Carlos Calderón	Juan Carlos Calderón
Sweden	SR	The Nova	"You're Summer"	English	Carl-Axel Dominique; Monica Dominique; Lars Forssell	Monica Dominique
Switzerland	SRG SSR	Patrick Juvet	"Je vais me marier, Marie"	French	Pierre Delanoë; Patrick Juvet	Hervé Roy
United Kingdom	BBC	Cliff Richard	"Power to All Our Friends"	English	Guy Fletcher; Doug Flett	David Mackay
Yugoslavia	JRT	Zdravko Čolić	"Gori vatra" (Гори ватра)	Serbo-Croatian	Kemal Monteno	Esad Arnautalić

== Production and format ==
The Eurovision Song Contest 1973 was produced by the Luxembourgish public broadcaster Compagnie Luxembourgeoise de Télédiffusion (CLT), with some technical assistance provided by the German public broadcaster ARD. Paul Ulveling served as producer, René Steichen served as director, Joachim Dzierzenga served as designer, and Pierre Cao served as musical director, leading the 46-piece Radio Télé Luxembourg orchestra. A separate musical director could be nominated by each participating delegation to lead the orchestra during its country's performance, with the host musical director also available to conduct for those countries which did not nominate their own conductor. On behalf of the EBU, the event was overseen by Clifford Brown as scrutineer. The contest was presented by the German radio and television presenter Helga Guitton, a regular presenter on the German-language Radio Luxemburg and the French-language Télé-Luxembourg. The preparation and production activities of the contest coincided with the introduction of colour television on Télé-Luxembourg in late 1972.

Each participating broadcaster submitted one song, which was required to be no longer than three minutes in duration. A maximum of six performers were allowed on stage during each country's performance. Following the confirmation of the eighteen planned participating countries, the draw to determine the running order of the contest was held on 8 January 1973 at the Villa Louvigny television studios in Luxembourg City, conducted by Jacques Harvey and Helga Guitton in the presence of Clifford Brown for the EBU and Gust Graas and Camille Ernster for CLT; had Malta competed as expected, they would have performed in sixth position, between the entries from Norway and Monaco.

The voting system used for the previous two years returned: each participating broadcaster appointed two individuals – one below the age of 25, the other above, and with at least 10 years between their ages – who awarded each song a score between one and five votes, except for the song from their own country. The jurors were situated within Villa Louvigny, where they followed the contest on television, and after each country had performed were required to record their votes, so that they could not be altered later. The jurors were shown on screen during the voting sequence, with the scores being announced on screen by the jurors in blocks of three countries, with the final two countries voting as a block of two; the jurors were accommodated in a hotel in Mondorf-les-Bains, 28 kilometres (17 mi) from Luxembourg City, and were forbidden from mixing with the competing delegations.

Songs were permitted for the first time to be performed in any language, and not solely the official or national language or languages of the country they represented. The countries which opted to take advantage of this new-found freedom were Finland and Sweden, who sang in English, and Norway, whose song was primarily in English and French but also featured lyrics in multiple other European languages. This edition was the first to feature pre-recorded backing tracks, which could be used either with or without supplementation by the orchestra; any backing tracks were however required to include only the sound of instruments featured on stage being mimed by the performers. The first entry to be performed with a backing track accompaniment was that of the United Kingdom.

Rehearsals for the participating artists began on 4 April 1973, with each delegation receiving one 45-minute slot on stage between 4 and 6 April. The order in which the countries rehearsed was determined by how close they were to Luxembourg. Rehearsals of the interval act and presenter in the contest venue, and the juries in the television studio, were also conducted on 6 April, followed by a full dress rehearsal. Technical rehearsals and further rehearsals for the juries were held in the morning of 7 April, followed by another full dress rehearsal in the afternoon ahead of the live transmission.

With Israel participating for the first time, and with the contest being held only months after an attack on the Israeli team at the 1972 Summer Olympics in Munich, West Germany, Luxembourg mounted extensive security arrangements for the contest: the Nouveau Théâtre was sealed off for the duration of the contest's preparation, and when not required at the contest venue the Israeli delegation were isolated on the top floor of the Holiday Inn protected by armed guards. Audience members were instructed not to stand up during the contest itself at the risk of being shot by armed security within the venue, while Israeli entrant Ilanit was rumoured to have worn a bulletproof vest underneath her outfit during her performance.

== Contest overview ==
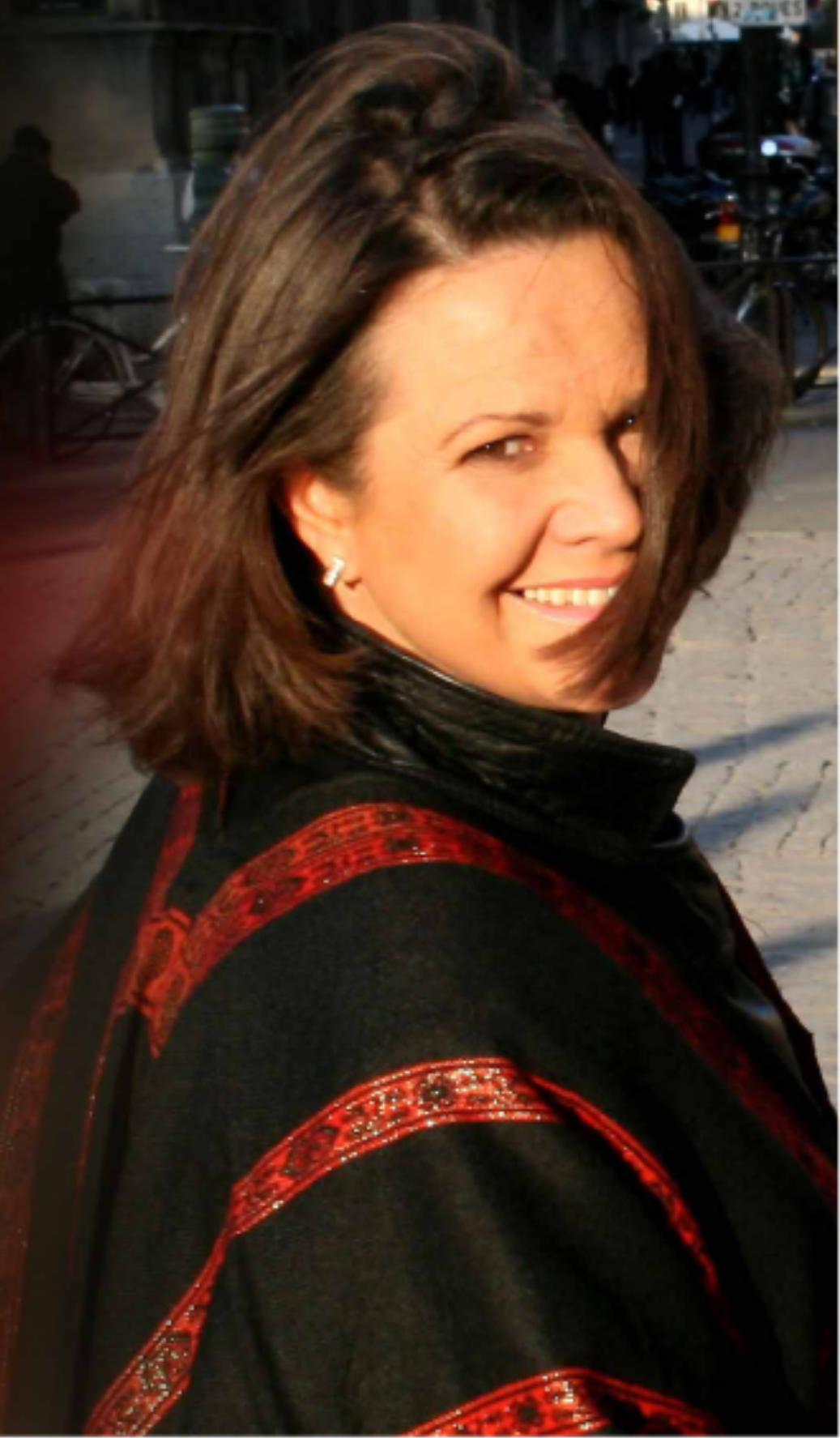
Host country Luxembourg achieved back-to-back wins courtesy of the French singer Anne-Marie David (pictured in 2008)

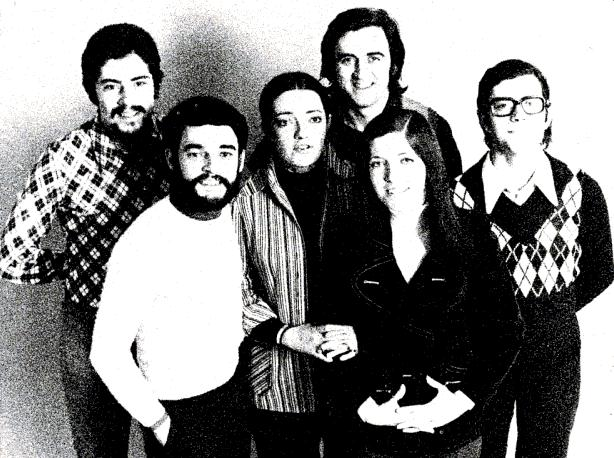
The Spanish group Mocedades went on to achieve global success with their Eurovision entry "Eres tú", one of only a handful of non-English songs to chart within the top 10 of the United States' Billboard Hot 100.

The contest was held on 7 April 1973, beginning at 21:30 (CET) and lasting 1 hour and 40 minutes. In attendance for the contest were Princess Marie-Astrid, Princess Margaretha and Prince Jean of the grand ducal family of Luxembourg.

The interval act was a performance by the Spanish clown Charlie Rivel, introduced by Guitton as "la grande diva Carlotta Rivello", who performed a comedic routine in drag as an operatic prima donna. It was the first occurrence of a drag performance at the Eurovision Song Contest, predating the first appearance of drag artists in a competing entry by thirteen years, and the first drag act to compete as the main performers for a country by twenty-nine years. The prize for the winning artist and songwriters was presented by the previous year's winning artist Vicky Leandros.

The winner was Luxembourg represented by the song "Tu te reconnaîtras", composed by Claude Morgan, written by Vline Buggy and performed by the French singer Anne-Marie David. It was Luxembourg's fourth contest victory, following wins in 1961, 1965 and 1972, becoming the first to achieve two outright wins in a row, and the second country to win twice in a row after Spain, which had achieved back-to-back wins in 1968 and 1969, the latter of which as part of a four-way tie. With four wins David's victory also brought Luxembourg level for most wins overall, tied with France who held three outright wins in 1958, 1960, and 1962 and one shared win in 1969. Spain and the United Kingdom finished in second and third, respectively, with the top three separated by only six votes. Israel placed fourth, the best result for a debuting entry since Denmark's third place in 1957, and Sweden placed fifth, despite some consternation over the lyrics of its entry, including: "Oh your breasts are like swallows a-nestling". Finland also achieved its best-ever result to that point, with a sixth-place finish. In addition to the traditional full reprise of the winning song by Anne-Marie David, a shorter version of the song was performed by her during the closing credits.

Following the contest, the top three songs, "Tu te reconnaîtras", the Spanish entry "Eres tú", written by Juan Carlos Calderón and performed by the group Mocedades, and the UK entry "Power to All Our Friends" by Cliff Richard, all achieved considerable success on European music charts. "Eres tú" went on to global success, charting within the top 10 on the US Billboard Hot 100 in 1974, one of only a handful of non-English-language songs to have achieved this feat. "Eres tú" was subsequently nominated in 2005 to compete in Congratulations: 50 Years of the Eurovision Song Contest, a special broadcast to determine the contest's most popular entry of its first 50 years as part of the contest's anniversary celebrations, as one of fourteen entries chosen to compete, and ultimately finished in eleventh place.

Results of the Eurovision Song Contest 1973
R/O	Country	Artist	Song	Votes	Place
1	Finland	Marion Rung	"Tom Tom Tom"	93	6
2	Belgium	Nicole and Hugo	"Baby Baby"	58	17
3	Portugal	Fernando Tordo	"Tourada"	80	10
4	Germany	Gitte	"Junger Tag"	85	8
5	Norway	Bendik Singers	"It's Just a Game"	89	7
6	Monaco	Marie	"Un train qui part"	85	8
7	Spain	Mocedades	"Eres tú"	125	2
8	Switzerland	Patrick Juvet	"Je vais me marier, Marie"	79	12
9	Yugoslavia	Zdravko Čolić	"Gori vatra"	65	15
10	Italy	Massimo Ranieri	"Chi sarà con te"	74	13
11	Luxembourg	Anne-Marie David	"Tu te reconnaîtras"	129	1
12	Sweden	The Nova	"You're Summer"	94	5
13	Netherlands	Ben Cramer	"De oude muzikant"	69	14
14	Ireland	Maxi	"Do I Dream"	80	10
15	United Kingdom	Cliff Richard	"Power to All Our Friends"	123	3
16	France	Martine Clémenceau	"Sans toi"	65	15
17	Israel	Ilanit	"Ey Sham"	97	4

== Detailed voting results ==
Jury voting was used to determine the votes awarded by all countries. The announcement of the results from each country's two jury members was conducted in the order in which their nation performed; the jurors were shown on camera when presenting their scores, with each juror using small boards in front of their desks with numbers 1 to 5 which they flipped up to reveal their votes for the country being awarded. The results of three countries at a time were totalled and presented as one score, with all seventeen countries receiving their scores before moving on to the next three countries to award their scores. The detailed breakdown of the votes awarded by each country is listed in the tables below, with voting countries listed in the order in which they presented their votes.

With 129 votes "Tu te reconnaîtras" is the highest-scoring song under the voting system used between 1971 and 1973; additionally, with 80.63% of the maximum votes available, this win represents, as of 2026, the most successful score for any winning entry when compared to the potential maximum score on offer.

Detailed voting results
		Total score	Finland	Belgium	Portugal	Germany	Norway	Monaco	Spain	Switzerland	Yugoslavia	Italy	Luxembourg	Sweden	Netherlands	Ireland	United Kingdom	France	Israel
Contestants	Finland	93		9	5	6	6	5	6	6	7	2	6	7	5	5	9	4	5
Contestants	Belgium	58	4		3	4	3	6	6	4	4	2	4	2	3	4	5	2	2
Contestants	Portugal	80	4	6		5	5	4	8	8	6	3	4	2	5	4	5	6	5
Contestants	Germany	85	2	5	6		4	5	9	7	4	3	7	6	5	6	5	7	4
Contestants	Norway	89	8	5	5	6		7	6	7	6	5	7	3	3	3	3	6	9
Contestants	Monaco	85	6	3	2	4	3		6	5	9	8	6	4	5	6	9	5	4
Contestants	Spain	125	3	8	9	9	4	9		8	9	**10**	8	7	**10**	**10**	4	9	8
Contestants	Switzerland	79	4	3	3	4	7	5	7		6	4	6	3	8	7	7	2	3
Contestants	Yugoslavia	65	5	3	3	4	2	5	8	6		2	4	2	4	5	4	4	4
Contestants	Italy	74	2	5	3	5	5	5	5	7	5		5	5	4	4	5	5	4
Contestants	Luxembourg	**129**	6	6	8	7	8	7	6	**10**	9	9		8	9	8	**10**	**10**	8
Contestants	Sweden	94	8	4	4	5	8	5	7	9	6	5	6		6	5	7	4	5
Contestants	Netherlands	69	4	4	2	5	5	4	5	5	5	4	7	3		5	3	6	2
Contestants	Ireland	80	3	7	2	4	6	6	7	5	5	5	6	5	6		5	4	4
Contestants	United Kingdom	123	9	6	6	7	7	8	4	8	8	5	**10**	9	**10**	9		8	9
Contestants	France	65	4	3	2	4	4	5	5	4	7	2	3	5	5	5	5		2
Contestants	Israel	97	6	6	5	7	5	7	4	6	7	7	8	6	6	7	5	5	

=== 10 votes ===
The below table summarises where the potential maximum of 10 votes were awarded from one country to another. The winning country is shown in bold. Luxembourg and Spain each received the maximum score of 10 votes from three of the voting countries, and the United Kingdom received two sets of 10 votes.

Distribution of 10 votes awarded at the Eurovision Song Contest 1973
No.	Contestant	Nation(s) giving 10 votes
3	**Luxembourg**	France, Switzerland, United Kingdom
3	Spain	Ireland, Italy, Netherlands
2	United Kingdom	Netherlands, Luxembourg

== Broadcasts ==
In addition to the participating nations, the contest was also reportedly aired, live or deferred, by broadcasters in Algeria, Austria, Greece, Iceland, Malta, Morocco, Tunisia, and Turkey, in Bulgaria, Czechoslovakia, East Germany, Hungary, Poland, Romania and the Soviet Union via Intervision, and in the Middle East and Japan, with an estimated global audience of 400 million. Known details on the broadcasts in each country, including the specific broadcasting stations and commentators are shown in the tables below.

Broadcasters and commentators in participating countries
Country	Broadcaster	Channel(s)	Commentator(s)	Ref(s)
Belgium	BRT	BRT, BRT 1		
Belgium	RTB	RTB	Paule Herreman	
Belgium	RTB	RTB 1		
Finland	YLE	TV1		
Finland	YLE	Yleisohjelma	Erkki Melakoski	
Finland	YLE	Ruotsinkielinen ohjelma		
France	ORTF	Première Chaîne	Pierre Tchernia	
Germany	ARD	Deutsches Fernsehen		
Ireland	RTÉ	RTÉ	Mike Murphy	
Ireland	RTÉ	RTÉ Radio	Liam Devally	
Israel	IBA	Israeli Television		
Italy	RAI	Programma Nazionale TV	Renato Tagliani	
Luxembourg	CLT	RTL Télé Luxembourg		
Luxembourg	CLT	RTL	Raym	
Luxembourg	CLT	Radio Luxembourg		
Netherlands	NOS	Nederland 1	Pim Jacobs	
Norway	NRK	NRK Fjernsynet, NRK (Note: Deferred broadcast on NRK at 23:00 (CET))	John Andreassen	
Portugal	RTP	I Programa	Artur Agostinho	
Spain	TVE	TVE 1	Miguel de los Santos	
Spain	RNE	Radio Nacional		
Spain	RNE	Centro Emisor del Atlántico		
Spain	RNE	Radio Peninsular de Huelva		
Spain	Cadena SER (Note: Simulcast on Radio Castellón, Radio San Sebastián, Radio Valladolid, and Radio Zaragoza. Delayed broadcast on Radio Lérida at 23:00 (CET).)			
Sweden	SR	TV1	Alicia Lundberg	
Sweden	SR	SR P3	Ursula Richter	
Switzerland	SRG SSR	TV DRS	Theodor Haller	
Switzerland	SRG SSR	TSR	Georges Hardy	
Switzerland	SRG SSR	TSI		
Switzerland	SRG SSR	DRS 1 (Note: Delayed broadcast on 9 April 1973 at 22:30 (CET))		
Switzerland	SRG SSR	RSR 1	Robert Burnier	
Switzerland	SRG SSR	Radio Monte Ceneri		
United Kingdom	BBC	BBC1	Terry Wogan	
United Kingdom	BBC	BBC Radio 2 (Note: Simulcast on BBC Radio 1, BBC Radio Birmingham, BBC Radio Blackburn, BBC Radio Derby, BBC Radio Humberside, BBC Radio Leicester, BBC Radio London, BBC Radio Newcastle, BBC Radio Nottingham, BBC Radio Oxford, BBC Radio Stoke, and BBC Radio Teesside.)	Pete Murray	
United Kingdom	BFBS	BFBS Radio	Richard Astbury	
Yugoslavia	JRT	TV Beograd 1		
Yugoslavia	JRT	TV Koper-Capodistria		
Yugoslavia	JRT	TV Ljubljana 1		
Yugoslavia	JRT	TV Skopje (Note: Deferred broadcast at 23:00 (CET))		
Yugoslavia	JRT	TV Zagreb 1		

Broadcasters and commentators in non-participating countries
Country	Broadcaster	Channel(s)	Commentator(s)	Ref(s)
Austria	ORF	FS2	Ernst Grissemann	
Czechoslovakia	ČST	II. program	J. Šrámek	
Greece	EIRT	EIRT		
Hungary	MTV	MTV (Note: Delayed broadcast on 8 May 1973 at 21:15 (CET))		
Iceland	RÚV	Sjónvarpið (Note: Delayed broadcast on 29 April 1973 at 21:30 (WET))	Jón O. Edwald	
Malta	MBA	MTS, National Network	Victor Aquilina	
Netherlands Antilles	ATM	TeleCuraçao (Note: Delayed broadcast on 14 May 1973 at 22:30 (ADT))		
Romania	TVR	Programul 1 (Note: Deferred broadcast in a shortened format on 29 April 1973 at 00:20 (EET))		
Turkey	TRT	TRT Televizyon		

== Notes and references ==
=== Bibliography ===
- O'Connor, John Kennedy (2010). The Eurovision Song Contest: The Official History (2nd ed.). London, United Kingdom: Carlton Books. ISBN 978-1-84732-521-1.
- Roxburgh, Gordon (2014). Songs for Europe: The United Kingdom at the Eurovision Song Contest. Vol. Two: The 1970s. Prestatyn, United Kingdom: Telos Publishing. ISBN 978-1-84583-093-9.
- Richard, Jean-Marc; Clapasson, Mary; Tanner, Nicolas (2017). La saga Eurovision [The Eurovision saga] (in French). Lausanne, Switzerland: Éditions Favre. ISBN 978-2-8289-1549-0.
- Thorsson, Leif; Verhage, Martin (2006). Melodifestivalen genom tiderna : de svenska uttagningarna och internationella finalerna [Melodifestivalen through the ages: the Swedish selections and international finals] (in Swedish). Stockholm, Sweden: Premium Publishing. ISBN 91-89136-29-2.
- Vermeulen, André (2021). Van Canzonissima tot Eurosong: 65 jaar Belgische preselecties voor het Eurovisiesongfestival [From Canzonissima to Eurosong: 65 years of Belgian pre-selections for the Eurovision Song Contest]. Leuven, Belgium: Uitgeverij Kritak. ISBN 9789401476096.
