= Switzerland in the Eurovision Song Contest 1973 =

- Eurovision Song Contest 1973
- Participating broadcaster: Swiss Broadcasting Corporation (SRG SSR)
- Country: Switzerland
- Selection process: Concours Eurovision de la Chanson 1973
- Selection date: 16 February 1973

Competing entry
- Song: "Je vais me marier, Marie"
- Artist: Patrick Juvet
- Songwriters: Patrick Juvet; Pierre Delanoë

Placement
- Final result: 12th, 79 points

Participation chronology

Switzerland was represented at the Eurovision Song Contest 1973 with the song "Je vais me marier, Marie", written by Pierre Delanoë, and performed and composed by Patrick Juvet. The Swiss participating broadcaster, the Swiss Broadcasting Corporation (SRG SSR), selected its entry for the contest through a national final.

== Before Eurovision ==
=== Concours Eurovision de la Chanson 1973 ===
The Swiss Broadcasting Corporation (SRG SSR) held a national final to select its entry for the Eurovision Song Contest 1973. The broadcaster received 61 total song submissions, and ultimately selected ten to take part in the selection, with five songs being performed in French, three in German, one in Italian, and one in all three languages. Among the participants were Henri Dès— who represented Switzerland in 1970– and Peter, Sue and Marc— who represented Switzerland in 1971, and would repeat this in 1976, 1979, and 1981. On 30 January, "Bitte glaub es nicht" by Monica Morell, who was drawn to perform as the tenth song, was disqualified due to its songwriter, Pepe Ederer, not having Swiss citizenship.

Swiss German broadcaster TV DRS staged the national final on 9 February 1973 at 21:00 CET in Zurich, presented by Regina Kempf. The nine participating songs were broadcast on television in the form of music videos, with the public being able to vote via postcard until 12 February at midnight. The songs were broadcast the following day on Télévision suisse romande (TSR), with presentation by Georges Hardy.

Participating entries
Broadcaster	Artist(s)	Song	Songwriter(s)		Language
Broadcaster	Artist(s)	Song	Composer(s)	Lyricist(s)	Language
TSR	Mady Rudaz	"Le vent qui soufflait ce matin"	Stuff Combe	Jean-Jacques Egli	French
TSR	Michel Bühler	"L'amour s'en vient, l'amour s'en va"	Michel Bühler		French
TSR	Henri Dès	"Quand on revient d'ailleurs"	Henri Dès		French
TSR	Patrick Juvet	"Je vais me marier, Marie"	Patrick Juvet	Pierre Delanoë	French
TSR	Claude Prélo	"Si tu t'en vas"	Claude Prélo; Mirta Campana	Claude Prélo	French
DRS	Britt Tobler	"Lass der Jugend ihre Liebe"	Pepe Ederer	Britt Tobler	German
DRS	Peter, Sue and Marc	"Es kommt ein Tag"	Peter Reber		German
DRS	~~Monica Morell~~	~~"Bitte glaub es nicht"~~	~~Pepe Ederer~~		German
TSI	Gil & Leonia	"Brakata-Tunga"	Mario Robbiani	François Heller; Georges Pilloud; Marzio Negrini	Italian, German, French
TSI	Yor Milano	"Il vecchio orologio"	Mario Robbiani	Yor Milano	Italian

The voting consisted of public votes, a press jury, and a jury of music experts. The votes, which were delivered in rankings, rather than points, were announced on 16 February in Bern by SRG SSR chairman Frank Tappolet. If a tie were to take place, the song with the best score from the public would be selected. An estimate of 40,000 votes from the public were cast. The winner was the song "Je vais me marier, Marie" performed by Patrick Juvet, written by Pierre Delanoë, and composed by Juvet himself.

Final — 16 February 1973
R/O	Artist(s)	Song	Public	Press Jury	Expert Jury	Total	Place
1	Mady Rudaz	"Le vent qui soufflait ce matin"	9	7	7	23	8
2	Michel Bühler	"L'amour s'en vient, l'amour s'en va"	6	2	5	13	5
3	Henri Dès	"Quand on revient d'ailleurs"	5	3	3	11	3
4	Patrick Juvet	"Je vais me marier, Marie"	3	1	1	5	1
5	Britt Tobler	"Lass der Jugend ihre Liebe"	2	4	4	10	2
6	Peter, Sue and Marc	"Es kommt ein Tag"	4	5	2	11	3
7	Claude Prélo	"Si tu t'en vas"	8	8	6	22	7
8	Gil & Leonia	"Brakata-Tunga"	1	6	8	15	6
9	Yor Milano	"Il vecchio orologio"	7	9	9	25	9

=== Releases ===
Patrick Juvet would record and release "Je vais me marier, Marie" in a titular single in 1973. He would also release the song in Spanish as "Sonia / Me Voy A Casar Maria" in a single that same year. In 1998, the song was featured in a CD compilation titled "Concours Eurovision De La Chanson 1956-1998: Schweizer Beiträge", which compiled every Swiss Eurovision entry at the time.

Most of the remaining songs from the selection, including Monica Morell's song, were commercially released that same year, with the exceptions of Mady Rudaz and Peter, Sue and Marc's songs. All of the presented music videos have been archived by SRG SSR.

== At Eurovision ==
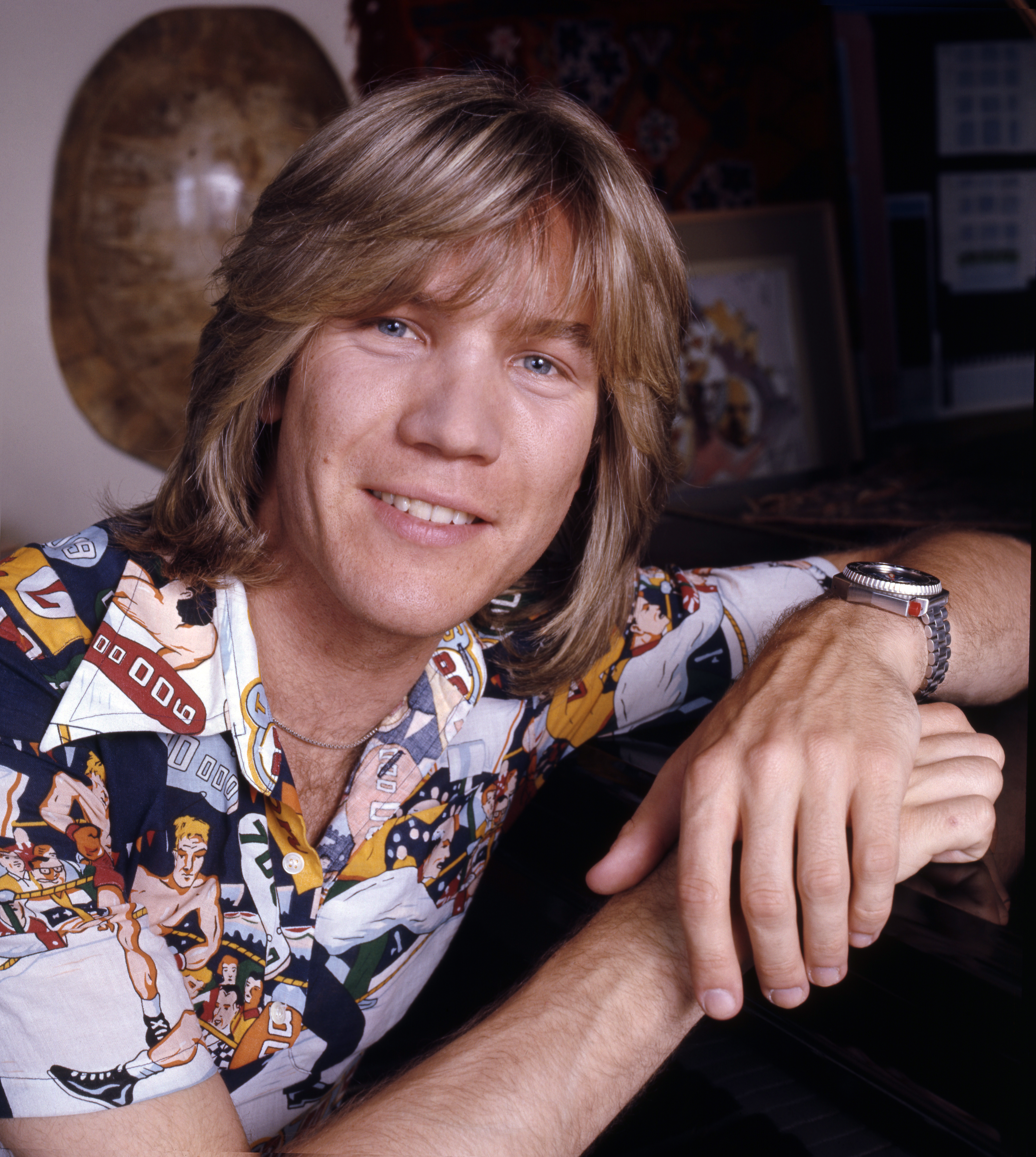
Patrick Juvet (pictured in 1976) represented Switzerland in the Eurovision Song Contest 1973

At the Eurovision Song Contest 1973, held at the Grand Théâtre in Luxembourg, the Swiss entry was the eighth entry of the night following Spain and preceding Yugoslavia. The Swiss conductor at the contest was Hervé Roy. At the close of voting, Switzerland had received 79 points in total; finishing in twelfth place out of eighteen countries.

The contest was broadcast on SRG SSR via TV DRS (with commentary from Theodor Haller) and DRS 1 (Note: Delayed broadcast on 9 April 1973 at 22:30 (CET)) in German-speaking Switzerland, TSR (with commentary from Georges Hardy) and RSR 1 (with commentary from Robert Burnier) in Romandy, and TSI and Radio Monte Ceneri in Ticino.

=== Voting ===
Each participating broadcaster appointed two jury members, one aged between 16 and 25 and one aged between 26 and 55, with at least 10 years between their ages. They each awarded 1 to 5 points for each song (other than the song from their own country) immediately after it was performed and the votes were collected and counted as soon as they were cast. All jury members were located at the CLT studios in Villa Louvigny, watched the show on television from there, and appeared on screen to confirm their scores after all songs were performed. The Swiss jury members were Paola del Medico and Yor Milano.

Points awarded to Switzerland
Score	Country
10 points	
9 points	
8 points	Netherlands
7 points	Ireland; Norway; Spain; United Kingdom
6 points	Luxembourg; Yugoslavia
5 points	Monaco
4 points	Finland; Germany; Italy
3 points	Belgium; Israel; Portugal; Sweden
2 points	France

Points awarded by Switzerland
Score	Country
10 points	Luxembourg
9 points	Sweden
8 points	Portugal; Spain; United Kingdom
7 points	Germany; Italy; Norway
6 points	Finland; Israel; Yugoslavia
5 points	Ireland; Monaco; Netherlands
4 points	Belgium; France
3 points	
2 points	
