= Finland in the Eurovision Song Contest 1973 =

- Eurovision Song Contest 1973
- Participating broadcaster: Yleisradio (Yle)
- Country: Finland
- Selection process: National final
- Selection date: 3 February 1973

Competing entry
- Song: "Tom Tom Tom"
- Artist: Marion Rung
- Songwriters: Rauno Lehtinen; Bob Barratt

Placement
- Final result: 6th, 93 points

Participation chronology

Finland was represented at the Eurovision Song Contest 1973 with the song "Tom Tom Tom", written by Rauno Lehtinen and Bob Barratt, and performed by Marion Rung. The Finnish participating broadcaster, Yleisradio (Yle), selected its entry through a national final.

== Before Eurovision ==
=== National final ===
Yleisradio (Yle) invited twelve composers for the competition. Since the songs were allowed to be performed in any language, this was the first time the Finnish national final featured songs entirely in other language than Finnish or Swedish (with two songs entirely in English). The national final was held on 3 February 1973 at Finlandia Hall in Helsinki, hosted by Alpo "Apeli" Halinen. The winner was chosen by a professional jury consisting of ten members. Each juror distributed their points between 1–10 points for each song. The best and worst points received by each song were ignored in the voting.

In addition to the performances of the competing entries, the interval act featured Päivi Paunu and Kim Floor performing their 1972 entry "Muistathan".

Final – 3 February 1973
R/O	Artist	Song	Songwriter(s)	Points	Place
1	Seija Simola and Paradise	"One, Two, Three"	Esko Linnavalli; Pertti Reponen	65	2
2	Jukka Kuoppamäki and Castanja	"Onnenmaa"	Jukka Kuoppamäki	51	6
3	Maarit	"Ampukaa pianisti"	Eero Koivistoinen; Jarkko Laine	51	6
4	Irina Milan	"Song for a Dove"	Frank Robson	53	4
5	Cumulus	"Noustaan perhosilla lentämään"	Valto Laitinen; Jyrki Lindström	48	9
6	Danny	"Galileo Galilei"	Jaakko Salo; Kari Tuomisaari	52	5
7	Aarno Raninen	"Odotan"	Aarno Raninen; Juha Vainio	39	11
8	Marion Rung	"Tom Tom Tom"	Rauno Lehtinen	69	1
9	Sammy Babitzin and Koivistolaiset	"Riviera"	Kari Kuuva	47	10
10	Nina	"Super-Extra-Wonder-Shop"	Esa Pethman; Tupuna Vaissi	39	11
11	Maarit	"Life Is a Jigsaw"	Seppo Paakkunainen; Jim Pembroke	58	3
12	Lasse Mårtenson and Cay Karlsson	"Hän on mennyt vuorten taa"	Lasse Mårtenson; Jukka Virtanen	49	8

Scoreboard
R/O	Song	Päivi Perkiö	Pirkko-Liisa Tikka	Marjut Siren	Jussi Tiainen	Erkki Melakoski	Kari Tikka	Heikki Sarmanto	Esa Helasvuo	Kristiina Kauhtio	Tuomo Tanska	Total
1	"One, Two, Three"	7	~~10~~	~~5~~	8	7	9	8	10	7	9	65
2	"Onnenmaa"	7	7	7	~~9~~	4	7	6	~~3~~	9	4	51
3	"Ampukaa pianisti"	5	~~8~~	~~4~~	7	6	6	7	7	5	8	51
4	"Song for a Dove"	~~4~~	7	6	5	8	~~9~~	7	8	8	4	53
5	"Noustaan perhosilla lentämään"	7	~~9~~	5	~~2~~	4	8	7	7	7	3	48
6	"Galileo Galilei"	6	~~9~~	6	6	~~4~~	8	5	7	9	5	52
7	"Odotan"	~~3~~	5	3	4	5	~~6~~	6	5	5	6	39
8	"Tom Tom Tom"	~~10~~	8	9	8	~~6~~	9	8	8	10	9	69
9	"Riviera"	6	6	~~3~~	6	5	5	7	6	~~8~~	6	47
10	"Super-Extra-Wonder-Shop"	~~3~~	5	6	3	4	7	5	~~9~~	4	5	39
11	"Life is a Jigsaw"	6	7	8	~~9~~	7	8	7	8	~~5~~	7	58
12	"Hän on mennyt vuorten taa"	8	5	~~9~~	~~2~~	8	4	6	7	6	5	49

The highest and lowest score received by each song were ignored and are ~~stricken through~~.

The winning song "Tom Tom Tom" was performed in Finnish in the national selection but translated into English for Eurovision. The English lyrics were written by Bob Barratt. However, the song title didn't change.

== At Eurovision ==
On the night of the final Marion Rung performed first in the running order, preceding Belgium. The entry was conducted by Ossi Runne. At the close of voting, Finland picked up 93 points and placed 6th of the 17 entries. It was Finland's best placing in the contest by then and would remain so for the next 33 years, until Lordi won the contest for Finland in 2006.

Each participating broadcaster appointed two jury members, one below the age of 25 and the other above, who voted by giving between one and five points to each song, except that representing their own country. All jury members were colocated in a television studio in Luxembourg. The Finnish jury members were Kristiina Kauhtio and Heikki Sarmanto.

=== Voting ===
Points awarded to Finland
Score	Country
10 points	
9 points	Belgium; United Kingdom
8 points	
7 points	Yugoslavia; Sweden
6 points	Luxembourg; Norway; Germany; Switzerland; Spain
5 points	Monaco; Ireland; Netherlands; Israel; Portugal
4 points	France
3 points	
2 points	Italy

Points awarded by Finland
Score	Country
10 points	
9 points	United Kingdom
8 points	Norway; Sweden
7 points	
6 points	Luxembourg; Monaco; Israel
5 points	Yugoslavia
4 points	France; Portugal; Switzerland; Netherlands; Belgium
3 points	Ireland; Spain
2 points	Germany; Italy
