= Portugal in the Eurovision Song Contest 1973 =

- Eurovision Song Contest 1973
- Participating broadcaster: Radiotelevisão Portuguesa (RTP)
- Country: Portugal
- Selection process: Grande Prémio TV da Canção Portuguesa 1973
- Selection date: 26 February 1973

Competing entry
- Song: "Tourada"
- Artist: Fernando Tordo
- Songwriters: Fernando Tordo; José Carlos Ary dos Santos

Placement
- Final result: 10th, 80 points

Participation chronology

Portugal was represented at the Eurovision Song Contest 1973 with the song "Tourada", composed by Fernando Tordo, with lyrics by José Carlos Ary dos Santos, and performed by Tordo himself. The Portuguese participating broadcaster, Radiotelevisão Portuguesa (RTP), selected its entry at the Grande Prémio TV da Canção Portuguesa 1973.

== Before Eurovision ==
=== Grande Prémio TV da Canção Portuguesa 1973 ===
Radiotelevisão Portuguesa (RTP) held the Grande Prémio TV da Canção Portuguesa 1973 at the Teatro Maria Matos in Lisbon on 26 February 1973, hosted by Alice Cruz and Artur Agostinho. Ten songs took part in the final. This event was also marked by the return of Simone de Oliveira to the songs, after being unable to sing for about 3 years. De Oliveira was awarded the Interpretation Award for her performance in "Apenas o meu povo". The results were determined by a distrital jury, that had 20 votes each, and a selection jury, composed of nine elements, to vote, each one with 10 votes to distribute among the songs in the contest.

Grande Prémio TV da Canção Portuguesa - 26 February 1973
| R/O | Artist | Song | Conductor | Jury | | Votes | Place |
| R/O | Artist | Song | Conductor | Distrital | Selection | Votes | Place |
|---|---|---|---|---|---|---|---|
| 1 | Tonicha | "A rapariga e o poeta" | José Calvário | 4 | 1 | 5 | 9 |
| 2 | Mini-pop | "Menina de luto" | Thilo Krassmann | 12 | 2 | 14 | 7 |
| 3 | Fernando Tordo | "Tourada" | Jorge Costa Pinto | 110 | 5 | 115 | 1 |
| 4 | Luís Duarte | "Minha senhora das dores" | Pepe Nieto | 1 | 2 | 3 | 10 |
| 5 | Paco Bandeira | "É por isso que eu vivo" | Igor Raymond | 103 | 9 | 111 | 2 |
| 6 | Paulo de Carvalho | "Semente" | Thilo Krassmann | 16 | 46 | 62 | 4 |
| 7 | Improviso | "Cantiga" | Thilo Krassmann | 16 | 3 | 19 | 6 |
| 8 | Duarte Mendes | "Gente" | José Calvário | 85 | 6 | 91 | 3 |
| 9 | Fernando Tordo | "Carta de longe" | Jorge Costa Pinto | 8 | 15 | 23 | 5 |
| 10 | Simone de Oliveira | "Apenas o meu povo" | Igor Raymond | 6 | 1 | 7 | 8 |

Detailed Distrital Jury Votes
| R/O | Song | Aveiro | Beja | Braga | Bragança | Castelo Branco | Coimbra | Évora | Faro | Guarda | Leiria | Lisbon | Portalegre | Porto | Santarém | Setúbal | Viana do Castelo | Vila Real | Viseu | Total |
|---|---|---|---|---|---|---|---|---|---|---|---|---|---|---|---|---|---|---|---|---|
| 1 | "A rapariga e o poeta" | | 1 | | | | | | 1 | | | | | | | 1 | 1 | | | 4 |
| 2 | "Menina de luto" | | 3 | | | | | | 1 | 1 | | | | | | | 3 | 1 | 3 | 12 |
| 3 | "Tourada" | 7 | 6 | 9 | 9 | 5 | 3 | | | | 15 | 10 | 16 | 6 | | 12 | 5 | 4 | 3 | 110 |
| 4 | "Minha senhora das dores" | | | | | | | | | | | | | | | | 1 | | | 1 |
| 5 | "É por isso que eu vivo" | 5 | 4 | 7 | 5 | 4 | 4 | 15 | 17 | 18 | 2 | | | | | 2 | 6 | 9 | 4 | 103 |
| 6 | "Semente" | 1 | 1 | | | 1 | 2 | | | | | | | 2 | 3 | | 2 | 1 | 3 | 16 |
| 7 | "Cantiga" | 3 | 3 | 1 | | 1 | | | | | | | | | | | 1 | 2 | 5 | 16 |
| 8 | "Gente" | 3 | 2 | 3 | 6 | 9 | 11 | 3 | | 1 | 3 | 10 | 3 | 5 | 17 | 5 | 1 | 3 | 2 | 86 |
| 9 | "Carta de longe" | | | | | | | | | | | | 1 | 5 | | | | | | 6 |
| 10 | "Apenas o meu povo" | 1 | | | | | | 2 | 1 | | | | | 2 | | | | | | 6 |

Detailed Selection Jury Votes
| R/O | Song | B. Domingues | I. Cruz | P. Rodrigues | M. Pereira | F. Teixeira | L. Andrade | F. D'Orey | A. Andrade | H. Mendes | Total |
|---|---|---|---|---|---|---|---|---|---|---|---|
| 1 | "A rapariga e o poeta" | | | 1 | | | | | | | 1 |
| 2 | "Menina de luto" | | | | | | | 2 | | | 2 |
| 3 | "Tourada" | | | | | | | | 5 | | 5 |
| 4 | "Minha senhora das dores" | 2 | | | | | | | | | 2 |
| 5 | "É por isso que eu vivo" | | | 4 | | | | 3 | 2 | | 9 |
| 6 | "Semente" | 2 | 4 | 1 | 5 | 10 | 10 | 3 | 1 | 10 | 46 |
| 7 | "Cantiga" | | | 1 | | | | 2 | | | 3 |
| 8 | "Gente" | 4 | | | | | | | 2 | | 6 |
| 9 | "Carta de longe" | 2 | 6 | 2 | 5 | | | | | | 15 |
| 10 | "Apenas o meu povo" | | | 1 | | | | | | | 1 |

=== Controversy ===
"Tourada" became very controversial after the night of the Festival because it was much more than a song with a bullfighting content, its lyrics cheated the regime of the time, insofar as it was a sharp criticism of the prevailing political and social regime. The possibility was still raised of not allowing "Tourada" to go to Eurovision, but the fears of the negative repercussions that this attitude would have internationally spoke louder and so the political power let Fernando Tordo take Tourada" to Eurovision.

== At Eurovision ==
On the night of the final Tordo performed 3rd in the running order, following Belgium and preceding Germany. At the close of the voting the song had received 80 points, coming 10th in the field of 17 competing countries. The orchestra during the Portuguese entry was conducted by Jorge Costa Pinto.

=== Voting ===
Points awarded to Portugal
| Score | Country |
|---|---|
| 10 points | |
| 9 points | |
| 8 points | Spain; Switzerland |
| 7 points | |
| 6 points | Belgium; France; Yugoslavia |
| 5 points | Germany; Israel; Netherlands; Norway; United Kingdom |
| 4 points | Finland; Ireland; Luxembourg; Monaco |
| 3 points | Italy |
| 2 points | Sweden |

Points awarded by Portugal
| Score | Country |
|---|---|
| 10 points | |
| 9 points | Spain |
| 8 points | Luxembourg |
| 7 points | |
| 6 points | Germany; United Kingdom |
| 5 points | Finland; Israel; Norway |
| 4 points | Sweden |
| 3 points | Belgium; Italy; Switzerland; Yugoslavia |
| 2 points | France; Ireland; Monaco; Netherlands |
