= Ireland in the Eurovision Song Contest 1973 =

- Eurovision Song Contest 1973
- Participating broadcaster: Radio Telefís Éireann (RTÉ)
- Country: Ireland
- Selection process: National Song Contest
- Selection date: 25 February 1973

Competing entry
- Song: "Do I Dream"
- Artist: Maxi
- Songwriters: Jack Brierley; George F. Crosbie

Placement
- Final result: 10th, 80 points

Participation chronology

Ireland was represented at the Eurovision Song Contest 1973 with the song "Do I Dream", written by the Cork songwriting team of Jack Brierley and George F. Crosbie, and performed by Maxi. The Irish participating broadcaster, Radio Telefís Éireann (RTÉ), selected its entry through a national final. The song eventually finished in equal tenth place (with Portugal) in the international final held at what was then the Nouveau Theatre, now the Grand Théâtre de Luxembourg, in Luxembourg City.

== Before Eurovision ==
=== National Song Contest ===
The ninth National Song Contest was held on Sunday 25 February 1973, and was broadcast live from Studio 1 in RTÉ, Dublin on RTÉ Television and RTÉ Radio, hosted by 1971 Eurovision mistress of ceremonies Bernadette Ní Ghallchóir. This year, the number of songs in the national final reverted to eight. The winning song was decided by 10 regional juries, each consisting of six members, throughout Ireland.

Alma Carroll had previously participated in the Irish national final in 1968, and finished in fourth place. Maxi and Barbara ('Dick') Dixon had both appeared in the 1970 national final as part of the girl trio Maxi, Dick and Twink, who finished in second place behind Dana. Danny Doyle had previously taken part in the 1971 National Song Contest, finishing in fourth place.

| R/O | Artist | Song | Songwriter(s) | Points | Place |
|---|---|---|---|---|---|
| 1 | Golden Dawn | "An Spéirling" | Eugene Moloney; Gabriel Rosenstock | 5 | 5 |
| 2 | Maxi | "Do I Dream" | Jack Brierley; George F. Crosbie | 23 | 1 |
| 3 | An Clannad | "An Pháirc" | Michael Hanly | 3 | 6 |
| 4 | Danny Doyle | "Colours of Our Mind" | Tony McNeive | 9 | 3 |
| 5 | Barbara Dixon | "An Chéad Ghrádh" | Chris Drummond | 1 | 8 |
| 6 | Family Pride | "I'll Remember" | Dermot Rattigan; Larry Moran Jr. | 3 | 6 |
| 7 | The Branagans | "Fadó, Fadó" | Donald Martin | 6 | 4 |
| 8 | Alma Carroll | "Love Is Grand" | Richard Billings | 10 | 2 |

== At Eurovision ==
=== Voting ===
Mike Murphy commentated for RTÉ Television viewers, and Liam Devally provided commentary for RTÉ Radio listeners. For the third (and final) time, each of the 17 participating countries sent two jury members to the venue to cast their votes in vision, awarding between 1 and 5 points to each song, with the exception of their own country's entry. The criteria was that one juror from each country had to be over 25 years of age while the other had to be under 25 years, with a gap of at least ten years between their ages. Three countries voted together in six rounds of voting with the remaining two, France and Israel, casting their votes together as there were only 17 countries instead of 18, as in the previous two years.

=== Voting ===
Points awarded to Ireland
| Score | Country |
|---|---|
| 10 points | |
| 9 points | |
| 8 points | |
| 7 points | Belgium; Spain |
| 6 points | Norway; Monaco; Luxembourg; Netherlands |
| 5 points | Switzerland; Yugoslavia; Italy; Sweden; United Kingdom |
| 4 points | Germany; France; Israel |
| 3 points | Finland |
| 2 points | Portugal |

Points awarded by Ireland
| Score | Country |
|---|---|
| 10 points | Spain |
| 9 points | United Kingdom |
| 8 points | Luxembourg |
| 7 points | Switzerland; Israel |
| 6 points | Germany; Monaco |
| 5 points | Finland; Yugoslavia; Sweden; Netherlands; France |
| 4 points | Belgium; Portugal; Italy |
| 3 points | Norway |
| 2 points | |
