= Netherlands in the Eurovision Song Contest 1973 =

- Eurovision Song Contest 1973
- Participating broadcaster: Nederlandse Omroep Stichting (NOS)
- Country: Netherlands
- Selection process: Artist: Internal selection Song: Nationaal Songfestival 1973
- Selection date: 28 February 1973

Competing entry
- Song: "De oude muzikant"
- Artist: Ben Cramer
- Songwriters: Pierre Kartner

Placement
- Final result: 14th, 69 points

Participation chronology

The Netherlands was represented at the Eurovision Song Contest 1973 with the song "De oude muzikant", written by Pierre Kartner, and performed by Ben Cramer. The Dutch participating broadcaster, Nederlandse Omroep Stichting (NOS), selected its entry through a national final, after having previously selected the performer internally.

The Netherlands was considered one of the most contemporary-minded countries when it came to choosing Eurovision entries, so the choice in 1973 of a stylistically and lyrically very old-fashioned song, which would not have sounded out of place in a 1950s contest, was widely regarded as rather strange.

== Before Eurovision ==
=== Nationaal Songfestival 1973 ===
The final was held on 28 February 1973 at the Theater Carré in Amsterdam, hosted by Viola van Emmenes and Simon van Collem. Four songs were performed and voting was by eleven regional juries with 10 points each to divide between the songs. "De oude muzikant" emerged the clear winner.

Final – 28 February 1973
| R/O | Song | Points | Place |
|---|---|---|---|
| 1 | "Kom met me mee" | 15 | 3 |
| 2 | "Melodie" | 14 | 4 |
| 3 | "Kom Sylvia dans met mij" | 19 | 2 |
| 4 | "De oude muzikant" | 62 | 1 |

== At Eurovision ==
On the night of the final Cramer performed 13th in the running order, following Sweden and preceding Ireland. At the close of voting "De oude muzikant" had received 69 points, placing the Netherlands 14th of the 17 entries.

The Dutch conductor at the contest was Harry van Hoof.

=== Voting ===
Points awarded to the Netherlands
| Score | Country |
|---|---|
| 10 points | |
| 9 points | |
| 8 points | |
| 7 points | Luxembourg |
| 6 points | France |
| 5 points | Germany; Ireland; Norway; Spain; Switzerland; Yugoslavia |
| 4 points | Belgium; Finland; Italy; Monaco |
| 3 points | Sweden; United Kingdom |
| 2 points | Israel; Portugal |

Points awarded by the Netherlands
| Score | Country |
|---|---|
| 10 points | Spain; United Kingdom |
| 9 points | Luxembourg |
| 8 points | Switzerland |
| 7 points | |
| 6 points | Ireland; Israel; Sweden |
| 5 points | Finland; France; Germany; Monaco; Portugal |
| 4 points | Italy; Yugoslavia |
| 3 points | Belgium; Norway |
| 2 points | |
