= Germany in the Eurovision Song Contest 1973 =

- Eurovision Song Contest 1973
- Participating broadcaster: ARD (Note: Arbeitsgemeinschaft der öffentlich-rechtlichen Rundfunkanstalten der Bundesrepublik Deutschland) – Hessischer Rundfunk (HR)
- Country: Germany
- Selection process: Ein Lied für Luxemburg
- Selection date: 21 February 1973

Competing entry
- Song: "Junger Tag"
- Artist: Gitte Hænning
- Songwriters: Günther-Eric Thöner; Stephan Lego

Placement
- Final result: 8th, 85 points

Participation chronology

Germany was represented at the Eurovision Song Contest 1973 with the song "Junger Tag", composed by Günther-Eric Thöner, with lyrics by Stephan Lego, and performed by Danish singer Gitte Hænning. The German participating broadcaster on behalf of ARD, Hessischer Rundfunk (HR), selected its entry through a national final.

== Before Eurovision ==
=== Ein Lied für Luxemburg ===
The final was held at the television studios in Frankfurt, hosted by Edith Grobleben. Six acts took part, each performing two songs. Songs were voted on by a 10-member jury who each awarded between 1 and 5 points per song. Unlike in the previous year's final, the result of which had caused a degree of controversy, there was no elimination and revote on the top songs. "Junger Tag" emerged the winner by just 1 point over "Sebastian" performed by Tonia, who had represented Belgium in 1966.

R/O	Artist	Song	Songwriters	Points	Place
1	Michael Holm	"Das Beste an Dir"	Michael Holm	25	9
2	Tonia	"Mir gefällt diese Welt"	Ralf Arnie; Fred Weyrich	30	7
3	Inga & Wolf	"Manchmal"	Wolfgang Preuß	32	6
4	Roberto Blanco	"Ich bin ein glücklicher Mann"	Christian Bruhn; Günter Loose	34	4
5	Gitte Hænning	"Junger Tag"	Günther-Eric Thöner; Stephan Lego	40	1
6	Cindy & Bert	"Wohin soll ich geh'n"	Klaus Munro	26	8
7	Michael Holm	"Glaub daran"	Wolfgang Rödelberger; Walter Buscher	19	12
8	Tonia	"Sebastian"	Heinz Kiessling; Carl J. Schäuble	39	2
9	Inga & Wolf	"Schreib ein Lied"	Wolfgang Scholz	36	3
10	Roberto Blanco	"Au revoir, auf wiedersehen"	Karl Götz; Kurt Hertha	24	11
11	Gitte	"Hallo! Wie geht es Robert?"	Georg Moslener; Walter Maidorn	33	5
12	Cindy & Bert	"Zwei Menschen und ein Weg"	Werner Scharfenberger; Kurt Feltz	25	9

== At Eurovision ==
On the night of the final Gitte performed 4th in the running order, following Portugal and preceding Norway. At the close of voting "Junger Tag" had received 85 points, placing Germany joint 8th (with Monaco) of the 17 entries.

=== Voting ===
Points awarded to Germany
Score	Country
10 points	
9 points	Spain
8 points	
7 points	France; Luxembourg; Switzerland
6 points	Ireland; Portugal; Sweden
5 points	Belgium; Monaco; Netherlands; United Kingdom
4 points	Israel; Norway; Yugoslavia
3 points	Italy
2 points	Finland

Points awarded by Germany
Score	Country
10 points	
9 points	Spain
8 points	
7 points	Israel; Luxembourg; United Kingdom
6 points	Finland; Norway
5 points	Italy; Netherlands; Portugal; Sweden
4 points	Belgium; France; Ireland; Monaco; Switzerland; Yugoslavia
3 points	
2 points	
