= Belgium in the Eurovision Song Contest 1973 =

- Eurovision Song Contest 1973
- Participating broadcaster: Belgische Radio- en Televisieomroep (BRT)
- Country: Belgium
- Selection process: Liedje voor Luxemburg
- Selection date: 25 February 1973

Competing entry
- Song: "Baby, Baby"
- Artist: Nicole and Hugo
- Songwriters: Ignace Baert; Erik Marijsse

Placement
- Final result: 17th, 58 points

Participation chronology

Belgium was represented at the Eurovision Song Contest 1973 with the song "Baby, Baby", composed by Ignace Baert, with lyrics by Erik Marijsse, and performed by Nicole and Hugo. The Belgian participating broadcaster, Flemish Belgische Radio- en Televisieomroep (BRT), selected its entry through a national final. Nicole and Hugo had won the 1971 national final with the song "Goeiemorgen, morgen", but days before the contest Nicole had fallen ill and was unable to travel to host city Dublin, so Jacques Raymond and Lily Castel had been drafted in as last-minute replacements.

== Before Eurovision ==
=== Liedje voor Luxemburg ===
The final took place on 25 February 1973, held in the Amerikaans Theater in Brussels and hosted by Jan Theys, with five acts performing two songs apiece. The contest was pre-recorded on 24 February and broadcast the following day. The winner was chosen by seven expert jurors who each named their favourite song, and "Baby, Baby" was the choice of four of them.

Final – 25 February 1973
R/O	Artist	Song	Songwriter(s)		Points	Place
R/O	Artist	Song	Composer(s)	Lyricist(s)	Points	Place
1	Rita Deneve	"Ga met me mee"	Jaak Horckmans	Rita Deneve; David Best	0	4
2	Nicole and Hugo	"Jij en ik en wij"	Paul Quintens	Phil Van Cauwenbergh	0	4
3	Ann Christy	"Bye Bye"	B. Richardson	Mary Boduin	1	3
4	Kalinka	"Nooit ga ik van je heen"	Willy Van Cauwenbergh	Luk Bral	0	4
5	Liliane Dorekens	"Morgen"	Al Van Dam		0	4
6	Rita Deneve	"Vrede voor iedereen"	Jaak Horckmans	Rita Deneve; David Best	2	2
7	Nicole and Hugo	"Baby, Baby"	Ignace Baert	Erik Marijsse	4	1
8	Ann Christy	"Meeuwen"	Adam Hoptman	Mary Boduin	0	4
9	Kalinka	"Home Sweet Home"	Paul de Coignies	Greta Bogaert; Marc Mory	0	4
10	Liliane Dorekens	"Kus, kiss, kuss"	Al Van Dam		0	4

== At Eurovision ==
On the night of the final Nicole and Hugo performed second in the running order, following Finland and preceding Portugal. Among their backing singers was Claude Lombard, who represented Belgium in 1968. At the close of the voting "Baby, Baby" had received 58 points, placing Belgium last of the 17 entries, the fourth time the country had finished at the foot of the Eurovision scoreboard.

Notwithstanding the bad result however, the couple's outrageously camp styling and performance have ensured that "Baby, Baby" has over the years gained cult status amongst Eurovision fans. Several clips from the performance were shown during Eurovision's 50th anniversary TV gala Congratulations in 2005, culminating in a live appearance by the pair, wearing their infamous purple 1973 outfits and performing an abridged version of the song. "Baby, Baby" remains an iconic Eurovision performance, far better remembered than hundreds of songs which finished much higher up the scoreboard.

=== Voting ===
Points awarded to Belgium
Score	Country
10 points	
9 points	
8 points	
7 points	
6 points	Monaco; Spain
5 points	United Kingdom
4 points	Finland; Germany; Ireland; Luxembourg; Switzerland; Yugoslavia
3 points	Netherlands; Norway; Portugal
2 points	France; Israel; Italy; Sweden

Points awarded by Belgium
Score	Country
10 points	
9 points	Finland
8 points	Spain
7 points	Ireland
6 points	Israel; Luxembourg; Portugal; United Kingdom
5 points	Germany; Italy; Norway
4 points	Netherlands; Sweden
3 points	France; Monaco; Switzerland; Yugoslavia
2 points	
