= Norway in the Eurovision Song Contest 1973 =

- Eurovision Song Contest 1973
- Participating broadcaster: Norsk rikskringkasting (NRK)
- Country: Norway
- Selection process: Melodi Grand Prix 1973
- Selection date: 17 February 1973

Competing entry
- Song: "It's Just a Game"
- Artist: Bendik Singers
- Songwriters: Arne Bendiksen; Bob Williams

Placement
- Final result: 7th, 89 points

Participation chronology

Norway was represented at the Eurovision Song Contest 1973 with the song "It's Just a Game", written by Arne Bendiksen and Bob Williams, and performed by the Bendik Singers. The Norwegian participating broadcaster, Norsk rikskringkasting (NRK), selected its entry through the Melodi Grand Prix 1973.

== Before Eurovision ==
=== Melodi Grand Prix 1973 ===
Norsk rikskringkasting (NRK) held the Melodi Grand Prix 1973 at the Château Neuf in Oslo, hosted by Vidar Lønn-Arnesen. Five songs were presented in the final with each song sung twice by different singers, once with a small combo and once with a full orchestra. The winning song was chosen by voting from a 14-member public jury who each awarded between 1 and 5 points per song. "It's Just a Game" was performed in Norwegian at the Melodi Grand Prix titled "Å for et spill", but with the introduction of the free-language rule in 1973 Norway was one of three countries (along with Finland and Sweden) who took the opportunity to translate their entry into English before the Eurovision final. The Bendik Singers included past and future Norwegian representatives Arne Bendiksen (1964), Anne-Karine Strøm (1974 and 1976) and Ellen Nikolaysen (1975).

MGP - 17 February 1973
R/O	Combo	Orchestra	Song	Points	Place
1	Gro Anita Schønn	Stein Ingebrigtsen	"Rett deg opp"	29	5
2	Anne-Karine Strøm	Benny Borg	"Det var jo sant"	40	2
3	Ellen Nikolaysen	Anne Lise Gjøstøl	"Om du kunne"	40	2
4	Ola Neegaard, Gro Anita Schønn, Stein Ingebrigtsen & Inger Lise Rypdal	Bendik Singers	"Å for et spill"	50	1
5	Lillian Harriet	Inger Lise Rypdal	"Alternativ"	36	4

== At Eurovision ==
On the night of the final the Bendik Singers performed 5th in the running order, following Germany and preceding Monaco. "It's Just a Game" was an unusually structured song for Eurovision, featuring jazz-influenced freestyle vocal interplay, and proved distinctive enough to earn Norway its first top 10 placing since 1966, finishing the evening in 7th place with 89 points. This proved to be Norway's only top 10 ranking of the 1970s, and would not be bettered until the victory of Bobbysocks! in 1985.

Each participating broadcaster appointed two jury members, one below the age of 25 and the other above, who voted by giving between one and five points to each song, except that representing their own country. All jury members were colocated in a television studio in Luxembourg. The Norwegian jury members were Inger Ann Folkvord and Johannes Bergh.

=== Voting ===
Points awarded to Norway
Score	Country
10 points	
9 points	Israel
8 points	Finland
7 points	Luxembourg; Monaco; Switzerland
6 points	France; Germany; Spain; Yugoslavia
5 points	Belgium; Italy; Portugal
4 points	
3 points	Ireland; Netherlands; Sweden; United Kingdom
2 points	

Points awarded by Norway
Score	Country
10 points	
9 points	
8 points	Luxembourg; Sweden
7 points	Switzerland; United Kingdom
6 points	Finland; Ireland
5 points	Israel; Italy; Netherlands; Portugal
4 points	France; Germany; Spain
3 points	Belgium; Monaco
2 points	Yugoslavia
