= Monica Dominique =

Swedish actor

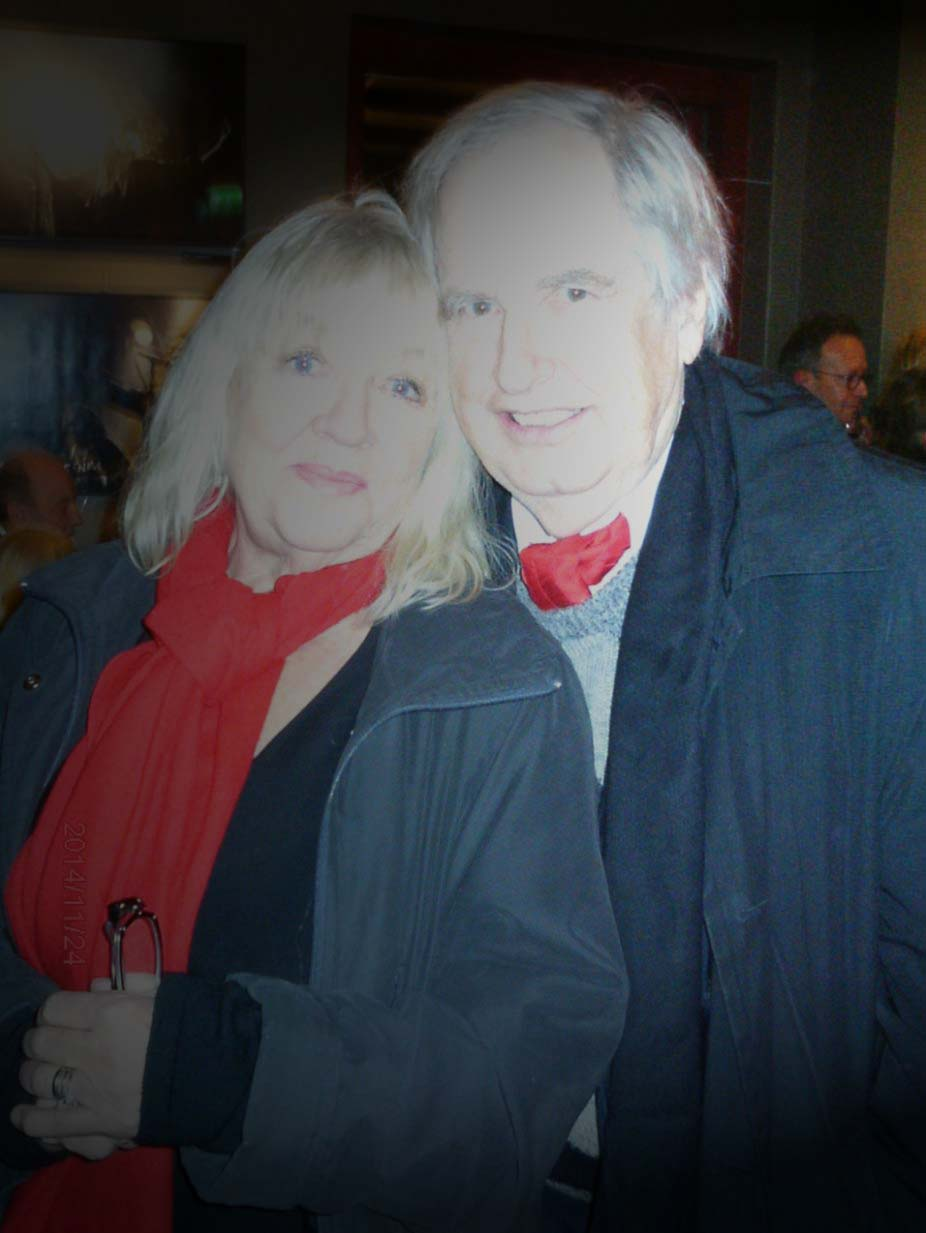

Background information
- Born: 20 July 1940 (age 86); Västerås, Sweden
- Instrument: piano
- Formerly of: Solar Plexus

Monica Dominique (née Danielsson; born 20 July 1940) is a Swedish pianist, composer, and actress. As a musician, she is primarily a jazz pianist, and she has composed with her husband, who is also a pianist. The two often perform piano four hands together in concert. Dominique acted from 1969 until the 1990s. Her brother was the jazz musician Palle Danielsson. She was inducted into the Swedish Music Hall of Fame in 2016.

== Life ==
As a child Dominique was able to play melodies from the radio on the piano, and played Donauwellen by the Romanian composer Ion Ivanovici as a four-year-old. As a student Monica Dominique attended the Adolf Fredrik's Music School in Stockholm. She was educated at the Royal College of Music, Stockholm, and has been active as a versatile but mainly jazz musician since the 1960s. In the early 1970s, she co-founded and played in the group Solar Plexus, where she was known for playing for the hammond organ. She started her career as an actress in 1969, playing the character Lotten in the TV movie Spader, Madame. She continued her acting career well into the late 1990s.

She and her husband, pianist and composer Carl-Axel Dominique, composed the song "You're Summer" for the Swedish group Nova to perform at the Eurovision Song Contest in Luxembourg in 1973, which she also conducted herself. The Dominique couple often perform together, playing piano four hands. Dominique has composed music for film and theatre, choral works, songs and big band suites. She was inducted into the Swedish Music Hall of Fame in 2016.

Her brother was the jazz musician Palle Danielsson.

== Discography ==
=== Albums ===
- 1988: Inside the Rainbow
- 1996: En flygel – fyra händer with Carl-Axel Dominique
- 1997: So Nice with Carol Rogers
- 2000: Mitt i mej
- 2003: Bird Woman (as Monica Dominique Quintet)
- 2004: Säg vad ni vill... men först kommer käket with Monica Nielsen
- 2006: Jösses flickor – Återkomsten
- 2009: Monica & Monica tolkar Beppe, Olle, Allan with Monica Nielsen
- 2011: Fingers Unlimited with Carl-Axel Dominique
- 2012: Togetherness with Palle Danielsson

== Filmography ==
- 1979: Repmånad
- 1979: Linus eller Tegelhusets hemlighet
- 1980: Räkan från Maxim (TV)
- 1981: Höjdhoppar'n
- 1982: Gräsänklingar
- 1990: Macken – Roy's & Roger's Bilservice
- 1996: Monopol

Soundtracks

- 1970: Förpassad
- 1970: Jänken
- 1983: Med Lill-Klas i kappsäcken (TV)
- 1983: Kärleken
- 1991: Sanna kvinnor (TV)
- 1996: Alla dagar, alla nätter (TV)
