= Spain in the Eurovision Song Contest 1973 =

- Eurovision Song Contest 1973
- Participating broadcaster: Televisión Española (TVE)
- Country: Spain
- Selection process: Internal selection
- Announcement date: Artist: 12 December 1972; Song: 5 March 1973

Competing entry
- Song: "Eres tú"
- Artist: Mocedades
- Songwriter: Juan Carlos Calderón

Placement
- Final result: 2nd, 125 points

Participation chronology

Spain was represented at the Eurovision Song Contest 1973 with the song "Eres tú", written by Juan Carlos Calderón, and performed by the vocal group Mocedades. The Spanish participating broadcaster, Televisión Española (TVE), internally selected its entry for the contest. The song, performed in position 7, placed second out of seventeen competing entries with 125 points. It was the best-scoring song in Spain's history at the Eurovision Song Contest until Chanel finished in 3rd place at the 2022 Contest with the song SloMo.

== Before Eurovision ==
Televisión Española (TVE) internally selected "Eres tú" performed by the vocal group Mocedades as its entry for the Eurovision Song Contest 1973. The song was written by Juan Carlos Calderón. Mocedades were announced as the performers on 12 December 1972, and a song was chosen for them later. The members of the group were Amaya Uranga, Izaskun Uranga, Roberto Uranga, Javier Garay, José Ipiña, and Carlos Zubiaga. The title of the song and the songwriter were announced on 2 February 1973. The song was released on 5 March.

On 8 March 1973, Mocedades participated in the Sanremo Music Festival 1973 with the song "Addio amor" singing in Italian. On 12 March, TVE broadcast on TVE 1 a special program dedicated to the group, directed by Miguel Lluch, filmed on location in Bilbao and in villages in Santander and Asturias, and in which they performed nine songs.

== At Eurovision ==
The Eurovision Song Contest 1973 was held on 7 April 1973 at the Grand Théâtre in Luxembourg. Mocedades performed "Eres tú" seventh in the running order, following Monaco and preceding Switzerland. Juan Carlos Calderón conducted the performance of the Spanish entry. At the close of voting the song had received 125 points, placing second in a field of seventeen.

TVE broadcast the contest in Spain on TVE 1 with commentary by Miguel de los Santos.

=== Voting ===
Each participating broadcaster appointed two jury members, one below the age of 25 and the other above, with at least 10 years between their ages, who voted by giving between one and five votes to each song, except that representing their own country. All jury members were located in a television studio at Villa Louvigny and showed their votes on screen during the voting sequence. The Spanish jury members were Teresa González and José Luis Balbín, who was TVE's delegate in Paris at that time.

Points awarded to Spain
Score	Country
10 points	Ireland; Italy; Netherlands
9 points	France; Germany; Monaco; Portugal; Yugoslavia
8 points	Belgium; Israel; Luxembourg; Switzerland
7 points	Sweden
6 points	
5 points	
4 points	Norway; United Kingdom
3 points	Finland
2 points	

Points awarded by Spain
Score	Country
10 points	
9 points	Germany
8 points	Portugal; Yugoslavia
7 points	Ireland; Sweden; Switzerland
6 points	Belgium; Finland; Luxembourg; Monaco; Norway
5 points	France; Italy; Netherlands
4 points	Israel; United Kingdom
3 points	
2 points	

== Congratulations: 50 Years of the Eurovision Song Contest ==
In 2005, "Eres tú" was one of fourteen songs chosen by Eurovision fans and a European Broadcasting Union (EBU) reference group to participate in the Congratulations anniversary competition. It was the only Spanish entry featured, as well as one of three entries featured that did not actually win the contest the year it competed (the others being "Nel blu, dipinto di blu" by Domenico Modugno and "Congratulations" by Cliff Richard). The special was broadcast live on La Primera of Televisión Española, with commentary by Beatriz Pécker and José María Íñigo.

"Eres tú" appeared fourth in the running order, following "Diva" by Dana International and preceding "Ein bißchen Frieden" by Nicole. Like the majority of entries that night, the performance was mostly by a group of dancers alongside footage of Mocedades' Eurovision performance, with the group themselves appearing toward the end of the performance (notably, appearing very moved at the warm reception they received from the audience in Copenhagen). At the end of the first round, "Eres tú" was not one of the five entries announced as proceeding to the second round. It was later revealed that the song finished eleventh with 90 points. In spite of this, it was also the only entry in the first round to receive multiple sets of twelve points without making it to the next round: one from the Netherlands (where the song had charted at #3 in 1973) and one from Spain themselves, who had the opportunity to vote for their own entry. In the second round, without their own entry to vote for, Spain's twelve points were awarded to ABBA's "Waterloo," which ultimately won.

=== Voting ===
Points awarded to "Eres tú" (Round 1)
Score	Country
12 points	Netherlands; Spain
10 points	Andorra; Belgium; Finland; Israel
8 points	
7 points	
6 points	Portugal
5 points	Bosnia and Herzegovina
4 points	Germany
3 points	Denmark; Slovenia; Ukraine
2 points	
1 point	Macedonia; Turkey
