= France in the Eurovision Song Contest 1973 =

- Eurovision Song Contest 1973
- Participating broadcaster: Office de Radiodiffusion Télévision Française (ORTF)
- Country: France
- Selection process: National final
- Selection date: 6 March 1973

Competing entry
- Song: "Sans toi"
- Artist: Martine Clemenceau
- Songwriters: Paul Koulak; Anne Grégory

Placement
- Final result: 15th, 65 points

Participation chronology

France was represented at the Eurovision Song Contest 1973 with the song "Sans toi", composed by Paul Koulak, with lyrics by Anne Grégory, and performed by Martine Clemenceau. The French participating broadcaster, Office de Radiodiffusion Télévision Française (ORTF), selected its entry through a national final.

== Before Eurovision ==
=== National final ===
Office de Radiodiffusion Télévision Française (ORTF) held the national final on 6 March 1973 at the Buttes-Chaumont TV studios in Paris. Six songs took part with the winner chosen by three juries made up of "experts", press and members of the public. Anne-Marie Godart had represented Monaco in 1972.

Final – 6 March 1973
R/O	Artist	Song	Points	Place
1	Martine Clemenceau	"Je suis venue de loin"	12	5
2	Martine Clemenceau	"L'arlequin"	8	6
3	Martine Clemenceau	"Sans toi"	21	1
4	Anne-Marie Godart	"Pas un mot, pas une larme"	15	3
5	Anne-Marie Godart	"Lui, il ne saura jamais"	14	4
6	Jean-Pierre Savelli	"Oui, je t'aime"	16	2

== At Eurovision ==
On the night of the final Clemenceau performed 16th in the running order, following the United Kingdom and preceding Israel. At the close of voting "Sans toi" had received 65 points, placing France joint 15th (with Yugoslavia) of the 17 entries – the only time that France finished outside the top 10 during the 1970s. Finished tied second-last was the nearest to last result for France from 1956 to 1997.

=== Voting ===
Points awarded to France
Score	Country
10 points	
9 points	
8 points	
7 points	Yugoslavia
6 points	
5 points	Ireland; Monaco; Netherlands; Spain; Sweden; United Kingdom
4 points	Finland; Germany; Norway; Switzerland
3 points	Belgium; Luxembourg
2 points	Israel; Italy; Portugal

Points awarded by France
Score	Country
10 points	Luxembourg
9 points	Spain
8 points	United Kingdom
7 points	Germany
6 points	Netherlands; Norway; Portugal
5 points	Israel; Italy; Monaco
4 points	Finland; Ireland; Sweden; Yugoslavia
3 points	
2 points	Belgium; Switzerland
