= Guitton =

Guitton or Guiton is a French surname. Notable persons with that surname include:

== Persons with the surname Guitton ==
- Abraham Duquesne-Guitton (1648–1724), French naval commander
- Helga Guitton (born 1942), German radio and TV presenter
- Jean Guitton (1901–1999), French Catholic philosopher

== Persons with the surname Guiton ==
- Jean Guiton (1585–1654), Mayor of La Rochelle and naval commander
