= Sweden in the Eurovision Song Contest 1973 =

- Eurovision Song Contest 1973
- Participating broadcaster: Sveriges Radio (SR)
- Country: Sweden
- Selection process: Melodifestivalen 1973
- Selection date: 10 February 1973

Competing entry
- Song: "You're Summer"
- Artist: The Nova
- Songwriters: Monica Dominique; Carl-Axel Dominique; Lars Forssell

Placement
- Final result: 5th, 94 points

Participation chronology

Sweden was represented at the Eurovision Song Contest 1973 with the song "You're Summer", composed by Monica Dominique and Carl-Axel Dominique, with lyrics by Lars Forssell, and performed by "Nova and the Dolls" consisting of Claes af Geijerstam och Göran Fristorp. The group was normally known under the name Malta. To avoid being confused with the country of Malta (even though Malta did not participate in that year's contest), they changed their name to "Nova" (with their backing group The Dolls) for the contest.

The song "You're Summer" contains the line "your breasts are like swallows anestling" ('Dina bröst är som svalor som häckar'), which went on to become one of the most known and most notorious text lines in Swedish music history.

The Swedish participating broadcaster, Sveriges Radio (SR), selected its entry through Melodifestivalen 1973. Malta the band won with the song "Sommaren som aldrig säger nej". The song was translated into English with the title "You're Summer" for Eurovision.

A then little-known competitor of the 1973 Melodifestivalen, a group of four called "Agnetha, Anni-Frid, Björn, and Benny", finished third with "Ring Ring". This group would return the following year under their new moniker ABBA.

== Before Eurovision ==
=== Melodifestivalen 1973 ===
Melodifestivalen 1973 was the selection for the 14th song to represent Sweden at the Eurovision Song Contest. It was the 13th time that Sveriges Radio (SR) used this system of picking a song. 10 songwriters were selected by SR for the competition. SR held the final in its television studios in Stockholm on 10 February 1973, presented by Alicia Lundberg and was broadcast on TV1 but was not broadcast on radio.

R/O	Artist	Song	Songwriter(s)	Points	Place
1	Lasse Berghagen	"Ding-Dong"	Lasse Berghagen	3	7
2	Ted Gärdestad	"Oh, vilken härlig dag"	Ted Gärdestad, Kenneth Gärdestad	7	4
3	Inga-Lill Nilsson	"En frusen ros"	Mats Olsson, Karin Stigmark	0	9
4	Björn and Benny, Agnetha and Anni-Frid	"Ring Ring"	Benny Andersson, Björn Ulvaeus, Stig Anderson	8	3
5	Glenmarks	"En liten sång som alla andra"	Östen Warnerbring	7	4
6	Kerstin Aulén and Mona Wessman	"Helledudane en sån karl"	Peter Himmelstrand	0	9
7	Claes-Göran Hederström	"Historien om en vän"	Claes Dieden, Anders Henriksson, Karin Stigmark	1	8
8	Lill-Babs	"Avsked från en vän"	Peter Totth, Britt Lindeborg	7	4
9	Malta	"Sommaren som aldrig säger nej"	Monica Dominique, Carl-Axel Dominique, Lars Forssell	37	1
10	Ann-Kristin Hedmark	"I våran värld"	Bengt-Arne Wallin, Anja Notini-Wallin	29	2

== At Eurovision ==
The contest was held in Luxembourg and Sweden was drawn into spot 12. They finished 5th (out of 17).

Each participating broadcaster appointed two jury members, one below the age of 25 and the other above, who voted by giving between one and five points to each song, except that representing their own country. All jury members were colocated in a television studio in Luxembourg. The Swedish jury members were Lena Andersson and Lars Samuelson.

=== Voting ===
Points awarded to Sweden
Score	Country
10 points	
9 points	Switzerland
8 points	Finland; Norway
7 points	Spain; United Kingdom
6 points	Luxembourg; Netherlands; Yugoslavia
5 points	Germany; Ireland; Israel; Italy; Monaco
4 points	Belgium; France; Portugal
3 points	
2 points	

Points awarded by Sweden
Score	Country
10 points	
9 points	United Kingdom
8 points	Luxembourg
7 points	Finland; Spain
6 points	Germany; Israel
5 points	France; Ireland; Italy
4 points	Monaco
3 points	Netherlands; Norway; Switzerland
2 points	Belgium; Portugal; Yugoslavia
