= United Kingdom in the Eurovision Song Contest 1973 =

- Eurovision Song Contest 1973
- Participating broadcaster: British Broadcasting Corporation (BBC)
- Country: United Kingdom
- Selection process: Artist: Internal selection Song: A Song for Europe 1973
- Selection date: 24 February 1973

Competing entry
- Song: "Power to All Our Friends"
- Artist: Cliff Richard
- Songwriters: Guy Fletcher; Doug Flett

Placement
- Final result: 3rd, 123 points

Participation chronology

The United Kingdom was represented at the Eurovision Song Contest 1973 with the song "Power to All Our Friends", written by Guy Fletcher and Doug Flett, and performed by Cliff Richard. The British participating broadcaster, the British Broadcasting Corporation (BBC), selected its entry through a national final, after having previously selected the performer internally. Richard had previously represented the United Kingdom in 1968.

== Before Eurovision ==
=== A Song for Europe 1973 ===
The show was held on 24 February 1973 and presented by Cilla Black as part of her BBC1 series Cilla. Cliff Richard performed all of the six finalists in the final, where the performances were then immediately repeated. He had previously performed one of the songs weekly in the run up to the final. Richard had been permitted to choose two songs for the shortlist of 12 entries, from which a panel including his manager and producer selected the final six. Viewers cast votes by postcards through the mail to choose the winning song and "Power to All Our Friends" was the winner with 125,505 votes, very nearly four times the score of the runner-up "Come Back Billie-Jo" which polled 34,209.

A Song for Europe 1973 – 24 February 1973
R/O	Song	Songwriter(s)	Votes	Place
1	"Come Back, Billie Jo"	Mitch Murray; Tony Macaulay	34,209	2
2	"Ashes to Ashes"	Tony Cole	17,116	6
3	"Tomorrow Rising"	Mike Hawker; Brian Bennett	21,868	4
4	"The Days of Love"	Dougie Wright; Alan Hawkshaw	18,304	5
5	"Power to All Our Friends"	Guy Fletcher; Doug Flett	125,505	1
6	"Help It Along"	Christopher Neil	25,369	3

=== Chart success ===
Both of the Top 2 songs were released as the A & B-Sides of a single, which reached No.4 in the UK singles chart, Cliff's first top 5 hit since "Congratulations" in 1968 and his last until 1979. For the first and only time in the history of the contest, all the entries from the UK final reached the UK singles chart. Following the release of the top two songs, the remaining four were issued as an extended play Eurovision Special single, which reached No.29 in the charts later in the year. The lead track, "Help It Along" was later released as the title track of Cliff's 1974 live album of Christian gospel music. All six songs were eventually made available on CD compilations. Richard recorded German, Spanish and French versions of the winning song. Eurovision Song Contest 1971 winner Séverine reached No.46 in the French singles chart with her French-language version of the song, "Il faut chanter la vie".

== At Eurovision ==
"Power to All Our Friends" placed 3rd in the Eurovision Song Contest. The 1973 contest became the most watched Eurovision Song Contest in the UK, with 23.54 million watching Cliff Richard perform in Luxembourg, almost 1 million more viewers than the record set in 1972. For the second year running, the contest was the No.1 rated TV show for the entire year in the UK.

This was also the first Eurovision Song Contest where Terry Wogan provided the BBC television commentary, having previously provided the BBC radio commentary for the 1971 Contest. Pete Murray returned for the fourth time to provide the radio commentary for BBC Radio 1 and 2 listeners. The contest was seen by about 9.8 million viewers.

Each participating broadcaster appointed two jury members, one below the age of 25 and the other above, who voted by giving between one and five points to each song, except that representing their own country. All jury members were colocated in a television studio in Luxembourg. The jury members from the United Kingdom were Catherine Woodfield and Pat Williams.

=== Voting ===
Points awarded to the United Kingdom
Score	Country
10 points	Luxembourg; Netherlands
9 points	Finland; Ireland; Israel; Sweden
8 points	France; Monaco; Switzerland; Yugoslavia
7 points	Germany; Norway
6 points	Belgium; Portugal
5 points	Italy
4 points	Spain
3 points	
2 points	

Points awarded by the United Kingdom
Score	Country
10 points	Luxembourg
9 points	Finland; Monaco
8 points	
7 points	Sweden; Switzerland
6 points	
5 points	Belgium; France; Germany; Ireland; Israel; Italy; Portugal
4 points	Spain; Yugoslavia
3 points	Netherlands; Norway
2 points	
