= Malta in the Eurovision Song Contest 1973 =

- Eurovision Song Contest 1973
- Participating broadcaster: Maltese Broadcasting Authority (MBA)
- Country: Malta
- Selection process: Song for Europe 1973

Placement
- Final result: Withdrawn

Participation chronology

Malta was to be represented at the Eurovision Song Contest 1973. The Maltese participating broadcaster, the Maltese Broadcasting Authority (MBA), was to select its entry through a national final. Deeming the quality level of the songs in the pre-selection for the national final to be too low, MBA opened a new submission period to find new songs. These new songs also didn't meet MBA's required level, so the broadcaster withdrew from the contest. Malta was drawn to perform in 6th place.

== Before Eurovision ==
=== Song for Europe 1973 ===
Song for Europe 1973 was the national final format developed by the Maltese Broadcasting Authority (MBA) which determined the song that would represent Malta at the Eurovision Song Contest 1973. The competition consisted of two parts, and was almost identical in format to their 1971 and 1972 national finals. The first part was the Malta Song Festival 1972, where the top 6 songs would then go on to the Song for Europe contest. The two contests were organised by two separate organisations; the Malta Song Festival was organised by the Malta Song Festival Board, while Song for Europe was organised by MBA. The use of Malta Song Festival as part of the Maltese national final was a cooperation between the two organisations, which lead to the broadcaster not actually being in control of the songs in its own national final. A new rule in Malta Song Festival gave MBA the right to decide after Malta Song Festival 1972, whether the songs are of high enough quality to be sent to the Eurovision Song Contest, and allowed them to withdraw their participation if they felt the song quality was too low.

==== Competing entries ====
The Malta Song Festival Board received 62 submissions, of which 2 were invalid, and were tasked with selecting 14 to compete in Malta Song Festival 1972. The composers of the chosen songs would then select a singer out of a pool of shortlisted singers that the Malta Song Festival organisers chose, but no singer could be chosen to sing two different songs. Already, during the selection period, MBA was having doubts that the song quality of Malta Song Festival 1972 was high enough, but since the Malta Song Festival 1972 rules stated that a decision on participating had to be taken after the contest, no action was taken. Evident of MBA's doubts about the song quality is that only 13 songs were chosen to compete in Malta Song Festival 1972 by the Malta Song Festival Board, instead of the intended 14.

Jon Lukas was meant to participate with "Issebbaħ il-jiem" but was replaced with Marika Bugeja as he was unable to be in Malta at the time.

Artist	Song	Songwriter(s)
Carmelo Borg	"Vagabond"	Unknown
Carmen Vella	"X'ħajja din"	Unknown
Carmen Xerry	"Nibdew mill-ġdid"	R. Agius, A. Sant
Doreen Galea	"Hawn u hemm"	Unknown
Edwin Galea	"Konna kuntenti t-tnejn"	F.X. Pisani, A.M. Cassola
Enzo Gusman	"Mal-jum il-ħsieb"	Unknown
Joe Cutajar	"Mingħajr imħabba"	R. Agius, A. Sant
Marika Bugeja	"Issebbaħ il-jiem"	Unknown
Mary Rose Mallia	"Iż-żernieq"	M. Rose Pisani
Merga	"Bħal fjuri"	E. Cassar
Pauline Grech Galdes	"Infittxek"	Unknown
The Links	"Viva l-karnival"	E. Vella
Vanna Bugelli	"Fjur taħt il-qatra"	Unknown

==== Malta Song Festival 1972 ====
Malta Song Festival 1972 was held on 23 September 1972 at the Corinthia Palace Hotel, hosted by Mary Grech and Norman Hamilton, and the top six, as voted by a jury, qualified to Song for Europe 1973.

R/O	Artist	Song	Result
1	Carmen Xerry	"Nibdew mill-ġdid"	Qualified
2	Marika Bugeja	"Issebbaħ il-jiem"	—N/a
3	Carmen Vella	"X'ħajja din"	—N/a
4	Joe Cutajar	"Mingħajr imħabba"	Qualified
5	Mary Rose Mallia	"Iż-żernieq"	Qualified
6	Pauline Grech Galdes	"Infittxek"	—N/a
7	The Links	"Viva l-karnival"	Qualified
8	Vanna Bugelli	"Fjur taħt il-qatra"	—N/a
9	Merga	"Bħal fjuri"	Qualified
10	Carmelo Borg	"Vagabond"	—N/a
11	Doreen Galea	"Hawn u hemm"	—N/a
12	Enzo Gusman	"Mal-jum il-ħsieb"	—N/a
13	Edwin Galea	"Konna kuntenti t-tnejn"	Qualified

==== Cancellation of Song for Europe 1973 ====
Shortly after Malta Song Festival 1972, MBA announced that they would not use the six songs that qualified from Malta Song Festival in Song for Europe 1973, as they deemed that the standard of songs was below the European standard, and instead would open a new submission period to find six new songs. MBA received 35 submissions, but after an evaluation of the songs, it was deemed that they were also of a not high enough standard and decided to not go ahead with Song for Europe 1973. Eventually MBA decided to withdraw from the Eurovision Song Contest 1973.

The contest was seen on MTS, and National Network radio, both with commentary by Victor Aquilina.
