= Ilanit =

Israeli musical artist

Ilanit אילנית
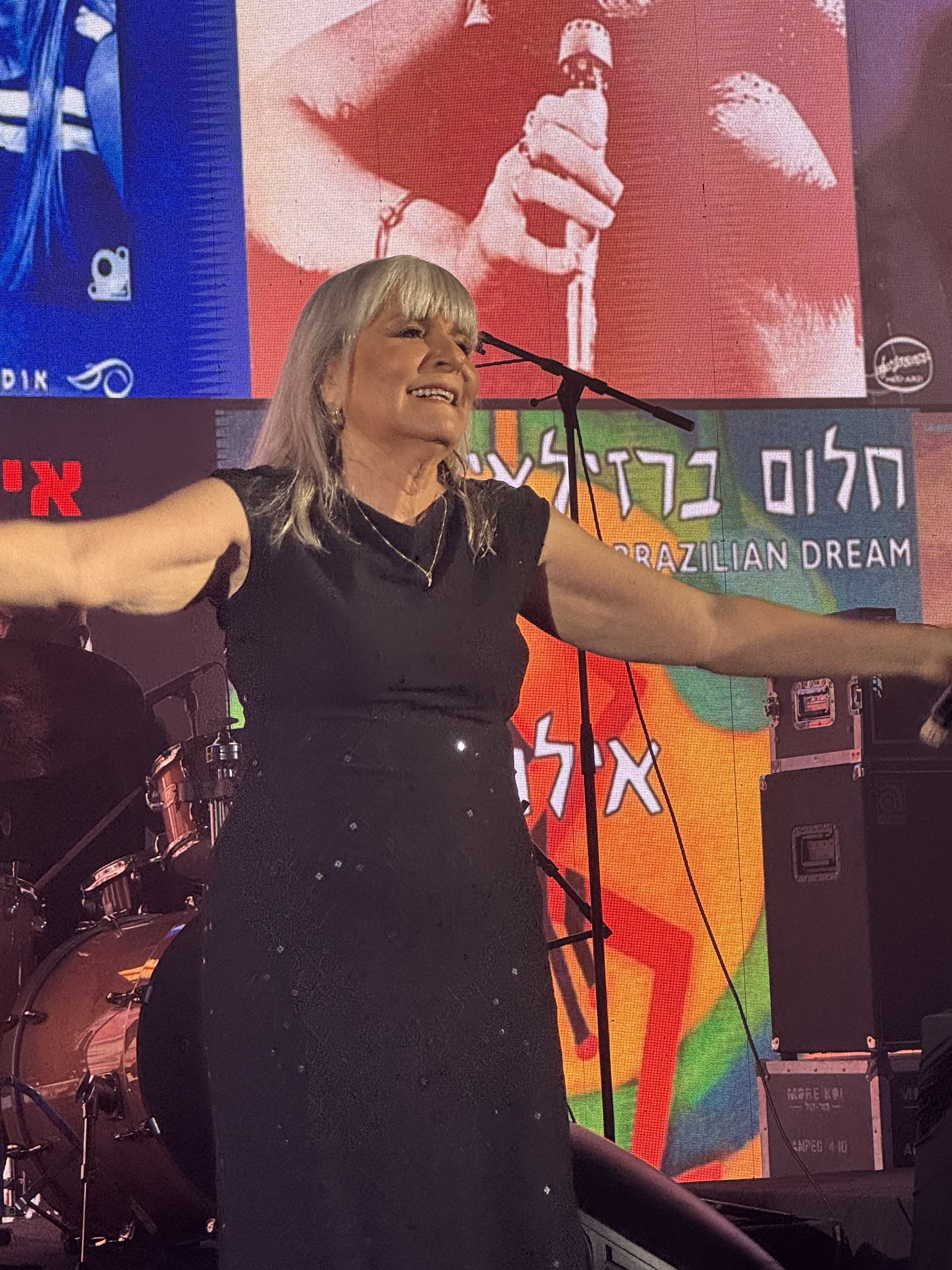

Background information
- Born: Hanna Dresner-Tzakh; 17 September 1947 (age 79); Tel Aviv, Mandatory Palestine
- Genres: Pop; Israeli music
- Occupation: Singer
- Years active: 1962–present
- Labels: NMC; Hed Arzi; Phonokol

Hanna Dresner-Tzakh (Hebrew: חנה דרזנר; born 17 September 1947), known by her stage name Ilanit (אילנית, Hebrew pronunciation: [ilaˈnit]), is an Israeli singer. She was one of Israel's most popular singers from the late 1960s to the 1980s, both as a soloist and in the duo Ilan & Ilanit. Ilanit also represented Israel twice in the Eurovision Song Contest, in 1973 with "Ey Sham" (Israel's debut entry in the competition) and in 1977 with "Ahava Hi Shir Lishnayim". In a career spanning over four decades, Ilanit has recorded and produced over 600 songs and more than 30 albums.

== Childhood ==
Hanna Dresner was born in Tel Aviv in 1947, after her parents had fled Poland in 1939. In 1953, at the age of 5, the family moved to Brazil where they joined several South American acts, at which point Dresner adopted the stage name Ilanit. She moved back to Israel in 1960, at age 12. In 1962, Ilanit was discovered in a youth talent contest organized by WIZO and the magazine Ma'ariv Youth.

== Music career ==
=== Ilan and Ilanit ===
Shlomo Zach, an Israeli singer whom she later married, formed a trio that was later known as Gidi, Zach, and Hanna (Hebrew: גידי, צח וחנה). The trio became a duo, renamed Ilan & Ilanit, and released their self-titled debut album in 1967. Two of their songs, "Lekol Adam Kochav" (לכל אדם כוכב) and "Boi Senyorina" (בואי סניורינה) became hits. Their 1971 song "Shuv Itkhem" (שוב אתכם) was covered by Turkish singer Şenay as "Sev Kardeşim".

=== Emerging as a soloist ===
In 1968, Ilanit released her first solo single, featuring the songs "Kvar Acharei Chatzot" (כבר אחרי חצות) and "Bo VeNishtage'a BaCholot" (בוא ונשתגע בחולות). She sang "Shir Be'Arba'a Batim" (שיר בארבעה בתים) in the 1969 Israel Song Festival.

=== Peaking in the 1970s ===
Ilanit represented Israel in its 1973 debut in the Eurovision Song Contest, hosted in Luxembourg. She finished in fourth place, performing the song "Ey Sham" (אי שם), composed by Ehud Manor and Nurit Hirsh, and conducted by the latter.

In 1974, Ilanit represented Israel at the World Popular Song Festival in Tokyo, performing the song "Shiru Shir LaShamesh" (שירו שיר לשמש), and finished in ninth place.

Ilanit represented Israel in the Eurovision Song Contest a second time in 1977, performing the song "Ahava Hi Shir Lishnayim" (אהבה היא שיר לשניים) and finishing in 11th place.

=== 1980s and 1990s ===
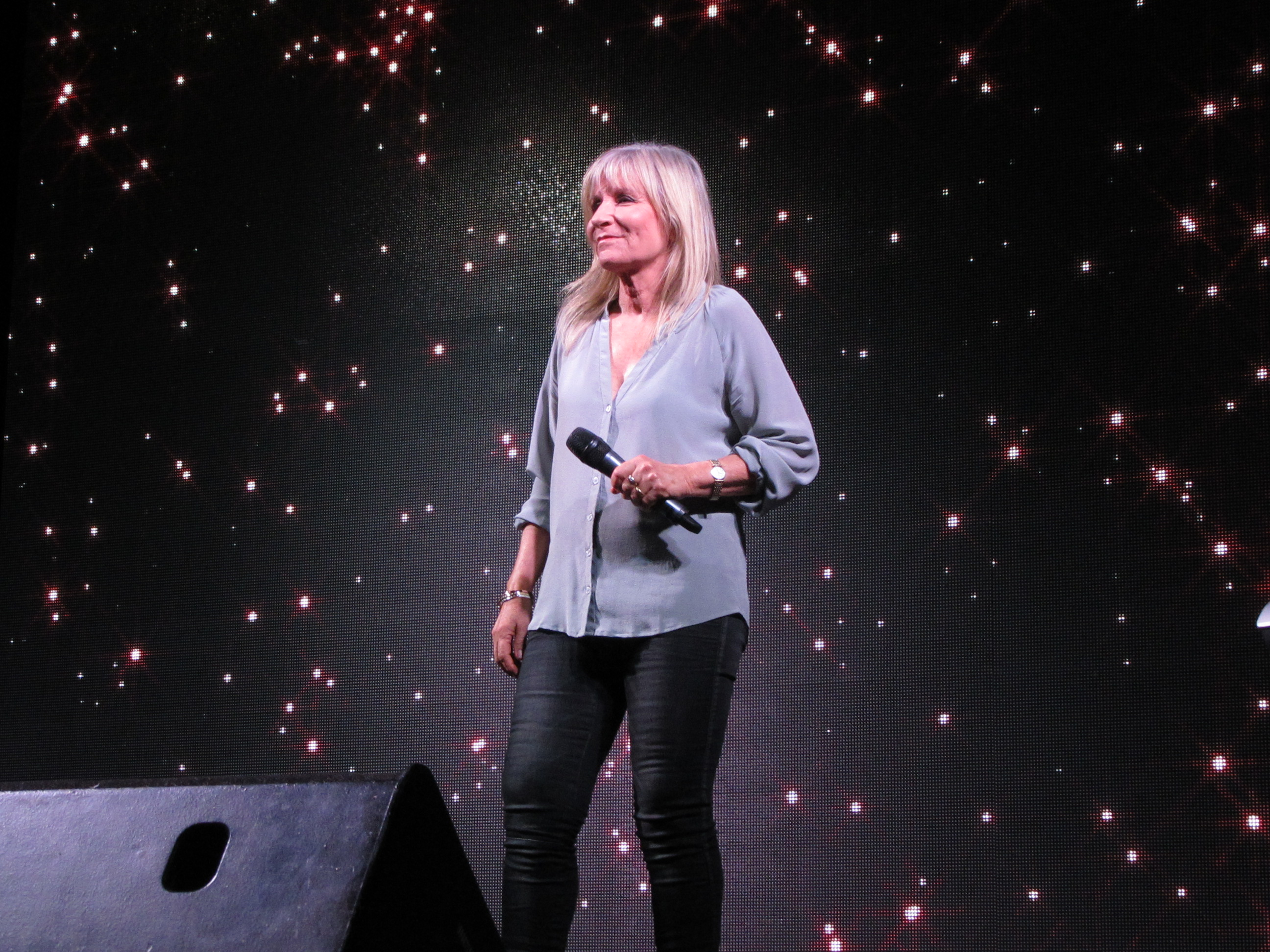
Ilanit performing, 2016

In 1984, Ilanit was approached by producer Shlomo Zach and offered to represent Israel in the Eurovision for a third time. She declined, and instead released the song outside of the contest. Israel did not participate in the contest that year due to a conflict with its Memorial Day. After the release of "Brazilian Dream" in 1996, Ilanit didn't record a new album for 12 years.

=== 21st century ===
Together with other established Israeli artists, Ilanit took part in a tour through North America in 2005. In 2008, Ilanit released the album "Israelit". She performed at the Hadassah centennial in October 2012. Ilanit also appeared at the opening of the final of the Eurovision Song Contest 2019 in Tel Aviv, where she performed the chorus of "Ey Sham". She also announced Israel's jury points at the Eurovision Song Contest 2023.

== See also ==
- Music of Israel

Awards and achievements
Preceded by Debut entry	Israel in the Eurovision Song Contest; 1973	Succeeded by Kaveret with Natati La Khayay
Preceded by Chocolate, Menta, Mastik with Emor Shalom	Israel in the Eurovision Song Contest; 1977	Succeeded by Izhar Cohen & Alphabeta with A-Ba-Ni-Bi
