= Nicole and Hugo =

Belgian singing duo (1971–2017)

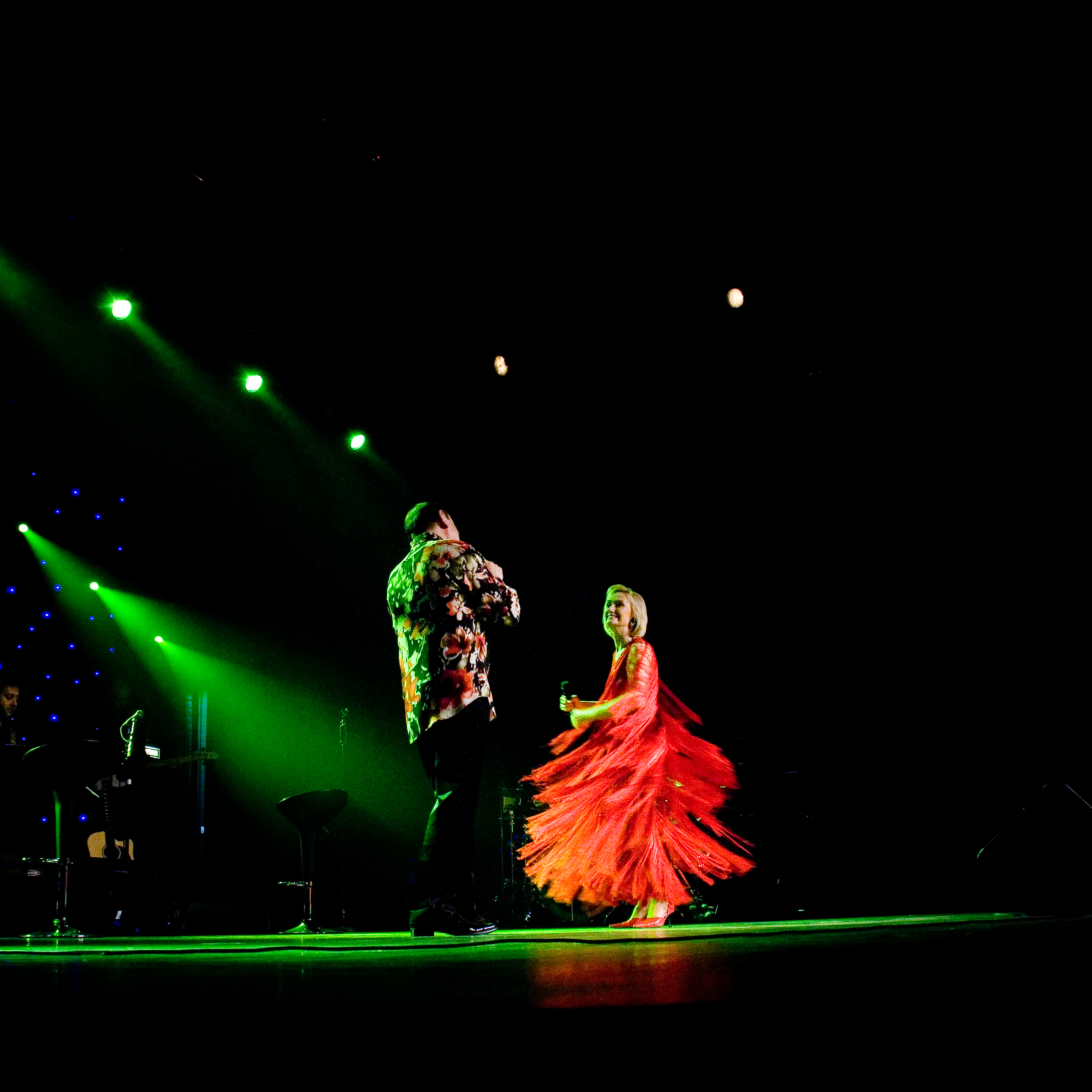
- Nicole and Hugo (2009)

Background information
- Origin: Belgium
- Genres: Pop
- Years active: 1970–2017
- Members: Hugo Sigal
- Past members: Nicole Van Pamel

Nicole and Hugo were a Belgian singing duo of Nicole Josy (born Nicole Van Pamel; 21 October 1946 – 4 November 2022) and Hugo Sigal (born 10 November 1947 as Hugo Verbraeken).

== Beginnings ==
The duo met in 1970 and became romantically involved and formed a singing duet. On 1 December 1971, Nicole and Hugo got married at Wemmel.

== Eurovision Song Contest 1971 and 1973 ==
In 1971, they entered into the Belgian national final for the Eurovision Song Contest and they won the Belgian final with "Goeiemorgen, morgen" (meaning "Good morning, morning" in Dutch). Prior to their departure to Dublin for the international competition, Nicole fell ill with jaundice and the duo were unable to attend. They were replaced in their absence by Jacques Raymond and Lily Castel. Jacques and Lily finished in 14th position from a field of 18 contestants.

Two years later they succeeded in participating in the Eurovision Song Contest finals when "Baby, Baby" won the Belgian national pre-selection. The song became a hit in the Flanders region of Belgium, but it was not a success in the rest of Europe. At the Eurovision Song Contest (held in Luxembourg on 7 April 1973) they finished in last place. Their performance was memorable, however, because of their purple flared jump suits and their dance routine.

== After Eurovision ==
In the 1974 World Popular Song Festival in Tokyo, Japan, their fortunes improved. They came second with the song "With the Summer". They also received the Outstanding Composition Award at the same festival. During the 1970s, they toured extensively internationally.

In 1984, they accepted an offer to entertain on cruise ships, sailing around the world in the process and on 20 October 1990, they were awarded a medal by the Belgian Authors Society SABAM for their contributions to the Flemish entertainment industry.

In 2004, they tried again, after 29 years, at the Eurovision Song Contest. They entered the Flemish pre-selections, with "Love is all Around". They placed second in the first round, but scored lowly with the jury, so failed to make it to the final round.

In 2005, they appeared on Congratulations: 50 Years of the Eurovision Song Contest, the 50th anniversary show of the Eurovision Song Contest. They appeared in all of the compilation videos and finally appeared on stage in the 1973 costumes. They then sang a shortened version of "Baby, Baby".

In 2008 the couple released their latest album Eeuwig Geluk including the hit singles "Pastorale", "Olé Ola" and others. Most of the lyrics have been written by singer/songwriter Hans Lambrechts.

Nicole Josy died on 4 November 2022, at the age of 76, after falling down the stairs in her home. She had been diagnosed with cancer twice and suffered from Alzheimer's disease.

== Discography ==
=== Albums ===
| Year | Album | Peak positions |
| Year | Album | BEL (Vl) |
|---|---|---|
| 2005 | Het beste uit 35 jaar | 43 |
| 2008 | Eeuwig geluk | 9 |
| 2012 | Bedankt Vlaanderen | 35 |
| 2014 | Voor het doek valt - het allerbeste van Nicole & Hugo | 20 |

=== Singles ===
| Year | Album | Peak positions |
| Year | Album | BEL (Vl) |
|---|---|---|
| 1971 | "Goeiemorgen, morgen" | 9 |
| 1973 | "Baby, baby" | 28 |
| 2004 | "Love Is All Around" | 42 |
| 2005 | "Ik denk aan jou" | 37 |
| 2005 | "Verliefd" | 40 |
| 2008 | "Pastorale" | 17 |
| 2011 | "Schietgebed" | 34 |

Other hits

- 2009: "Hier in mijn hart"
- 2012: "Vuurwerk"
- 2012: "Goeiemorgen morgen"
- 2012: "Dans de wereld rond"
- 2013: "Hier in mijn Vlaamse land"
- 2013: "Blijf bij mij"
- 2014: "Hou van mij"
- 2014: "Muziek is ons leven"
- 2015: "We gaan nog even door"
- 2016: "Hoe zal het zijn"
- 2017: "Alles komt terug"
- 2018: "Stay"

| Preceded by Serge and Christine Ghisoland with "À la folie ou pas du tout" | Belgium in the Eurovision Song Contest; 1973 | Succeeded by Jacques Hustin with "Fleur de liberté" |
