= Alicia Lundberg =

Swedish journalist (1933–2017)

Alicia Ivarsdotter Lundberg, (1933–2017) was a Swedish TV journalist and author, specialising in nature photography.

== Career ==
Lundberg started working as a host and presenter at the Swedish National Radio in 1959.

The year 1973, she was the host of the Swedish competition of Eurovision Song Contest as well as the commentator for the European show.

== Gorillas ==
Lundberg made more than 30 trips to Rwanda to document the Gorilla beringei beringei.

Her documentaries on the mountain gorillas of Rwanda have been shown many times on Swedish TV and are considered classics. She has also written a book on them, Bergsgorillornas rike. In an article for Dagens Nyheter, she has described how she could never forget the look in the eye of the young gorilla male who approached her, grabbed her arm, looked her in the eye and walked off. "It looked like he wanted to say: Who are you? I've never seen anyone like you before!"

Her knowledge of Rwanda led her to engaging against the Rwanda genocide in 1994, trying to raise awareness and managed to convince clothing company H&M to donate clothing.
