= Monica Morell =

Monica Morell (born Monica Wirz-Römer; 6 August 1953 in Menziken, Switzerland – 12 February 2008 in Zurich, Switzerland) was a Swiss singer.

She had a string of hits in Germany throughout the 1970s. Her biggest hit was "Ich fange nie mehr was an einem Sonntag an" which sold 1.5 million copies in 1973. In this song is mentioned a boy "Tommy", who died. In reality, ten years later, her son, also called Tommy, died. By the end of the 1970s, she quit the music business. She died of cancer in 2008, aged 54.
