= Michel Bühler =

Swiss singer-songwriter and playwright (1945–2022)

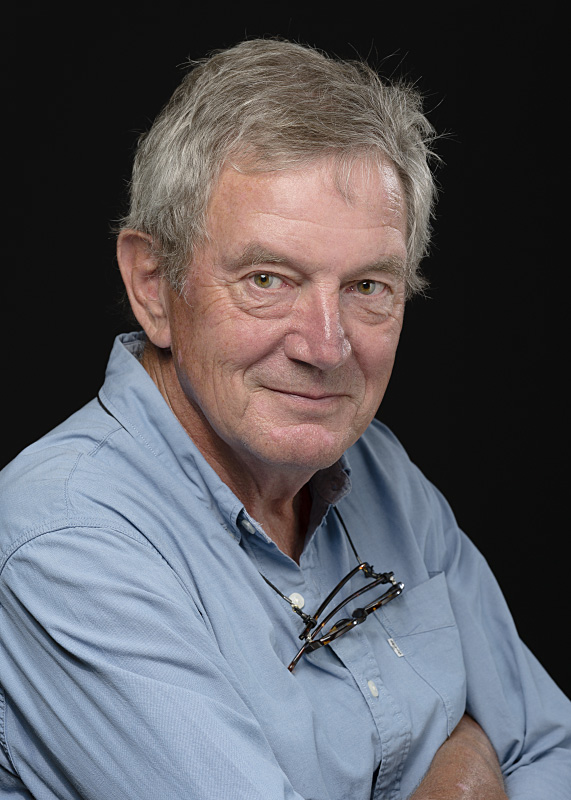
- Bühler in 2015
- Born: 30 April 1945; Bern, Switzerland
- Died: 7 November 2022 (aged 77); Lausanne, Switzerland
- Occupations: Singer-songwriter; Playwright

Michel Bühler (30 April 1945 – 7 November 2022) was a Swiss singer-songwriter, playwright, composer, actor, and teacher.

== Biography ==
Bühler spent his childhood and secondary studies in Sainte-Croix before attending normal school in Lausanne, where he obtained his teaching license in 1965.

Bühler then released albums and went on tours in Switzerland, France, and other French-speaking countries. Although primarily dedicated to music, he began a literary career in 1970, publishing two science fiction novels and several collections of stories and songs. He also wrote the screenplay of the telefilm Charmants voisins, with Daniel Prévost in the lead role.

Bühler took part in solidarity for oppressed people, singing his support for the Palestinian people in the song En Palestine. The death of a friend inspired him to write his third novel, Cabarete, in 1992. In 2003, he published Lettre à Menétrey.

In 2013, Bühler received the Prix Jacques Douai. In 2018, he participated in a mission to El Salvador as an election observer at the municipal and national level.

For 20 years, he was a member of the municipal council of Sainte-Croix with the Swiss Socialist Party and the Swiss Party of Labour.

Michel Bühler died of a heart attack in Lausanne, on 7 November 2022, at the age of 77.

== Discography ==
- Helvétiquement vôtre (1969)
- Michel Bühler (1971)
- Vivre nus (1973)
- Immigré (1976)
- Ici (1977)
- Simple histoire (1978)
- La belle folie (1980)
- Tendre Bühler (1981)
- Rasez les Alpes... qu'on voie la mer (1986)
- Il aimait les rires (1987)
- Le retour du major Davel (1988)
- L'autre chemin (1993)
- En public (1995)
- La Fête à Bühler (1995)
- Cuvée 90 (1996)
- Rue de la Roquette (1997)
- Comme un goût de solitude (1997)
- Jusqu'à quand? (1997)
- Voisins... (2000)
- Chansons têtues (2004)
- Passant (2008)
- Les Trois Cloches (2008)
- Voyageur (2009)
- Et voilà ! (2012)
- La vague (2016)
- Rouge (2021)

== Publications ==
- Avril 1990 (1973)
- La Parole volée (1987)
- La Véritable Histoire de Guillaume Tell (1989)
- L'Affaire Elvira Sanchez (1990)
- Cabarete (1992)
- L'Ombre du Zèbre (1994)
- Un Notable (1995)
- Charmants Voisins (1996)
- Le Temps du Plus (2006)
- La chanson est une clé à molette (2011)
- Retour à Cormont (2018)
