= Helga Guitton =

German radio and television presenter (born 1942)

- Born: 18 December 1942 (age 83); Königsberg, East Prussia, Germany (now Kaliningrad, Russia)
- Occupations: Disc jockey, television presenter
- Years active: 1965–present

Helga Guitton (born 18 December 1942) is a German radio and television presenter. She was a disc jockey and interviewer for RTL and was presenter of the 1973 Eurovision Song Contest.

== Biography ==
Guitton worked for RTL from 1964 to 1994. On Radio Luxemburg she co-hosted Tag Schatz, Tag Scherz with Jochen Pützenbacher, who later recalled that they worked so well together, there were rumours they were romantically involved. In 1983 she insisted on co-hosting a memorial programme for a colleague who had died of cancer, to give him moral support, but broke down crying. She hosted the weekday evening programme Viva – die Lust, zu leben, which included quizzes and interviews as well as music.

In the 1990s she worked for RTL plus, now RTL television; in 1988 she was engaged with Rainer Holbe to moderate a sexy interview show, "Kopfkissen-Gespräche bei Prominenten" (Pillow talk with VIPs); she later called these "Liebe ist..." interviews her most successful and enjoyable work, while she called Radio Telex her greatest failure. Her 1985 interview with a combative Klaus Kinski, who ate and drank throughout, only half an hour of which was broadcast, appears on the DVD Kinski Talks I, issued by WDR in 2010.

On 7 April 1973, she was the presenter for the Eurovision Song Contest.

After leaving broadcasting, Guitton became a style and behaviour coach.

== See also ==
- List of Eurovision Song Contest presenters

Preceded by (United Kingdom) Moira Shearer	Eurovision Song Contest presenter 1973	Succeeded by (United Kingdom) Katie Boyle
