= Bob Barratt =

- Born: Denis Mervyn Barratt; 22 March 1938; Croydon, Greater London, England
- Died: 30 January 2004 (aged 65) Southwark, London, England
- Occupation: Producer / A&R
- Years active: 1960–2002
- Label: EMI

Denis Mervyn "Bob" Barratt (22 March 1938 – 30 January 2004) was an English record producer for EMI and founder of record-label Grasmere Records.

Barratt died of liver cancer on 30 January 2004, leaving his wife and three daughters.

== Career ==
Barratt started working at Abbey Road studios in 1960 for Norman Newell as an "office boy" at the age of 22, as Newell found Barratt to be particularly polite during their previous interactions. During the following years, he worked with a number of the studio's most famous personnel, including Norrie Paramor and Tim Rice, and worked with a number of well-known artists, including Vince Hill, producing his cover version of the song "Edelweiss"; Max Boyce and The Wurzels, including their 1976 UK number one single "Combine Harvester (Brand New Key)".

In 1985, Barratt started Grasmere Records, a label specialising in brass band and organ music.

== Award honour ==
After chairing the Gold Badge award committee for the British Academy of Songwriters, Composers and Authors for some years, he was himself awarded one in 2002.
