= Liam Devally =

Irish radio and TV host (1933–2018)

Liam Devally (1933, Cahir, County Tipperary, Ireland – 9 April 2018, Dublin) was an Irish radio and television host and singer, and later a barrister and judge. Born in Cahir, the son of a Garda, the family moved to Mullingar, Co. Westmeath when Liam was young. Liam won a scholarship and attended St Enda's College, Galway.

Devally was known for hosting various programmes for Ireland, he was a radio host on RTÉ Radio 1, he was best known for Irish listeners between 1972 and 1979 when he commentated for RTÉ Radio listeners at the Eurovision Song Contest. He also recorded a number of songs including My Lagan Love and Eileen Aroon. Devally sang on the Ed Sullivan Show, in America, in 1959, he also played irish revolutionary Eamon Ceant in the dramatisation Insurrection in 1966.

He married Mairead Connaghton, who he met at RTE, and they lived in Blackrock, Co. Dublin.

Liam was also a Barrister and served as a judge of the Circuit Court from 1991 until his retirement. He died in Dublin on 9 April 2018, at the age of 85, and is buried in Kilmacanogue Cemetery, Co. Wicklow.
