= Fernando Tordo =

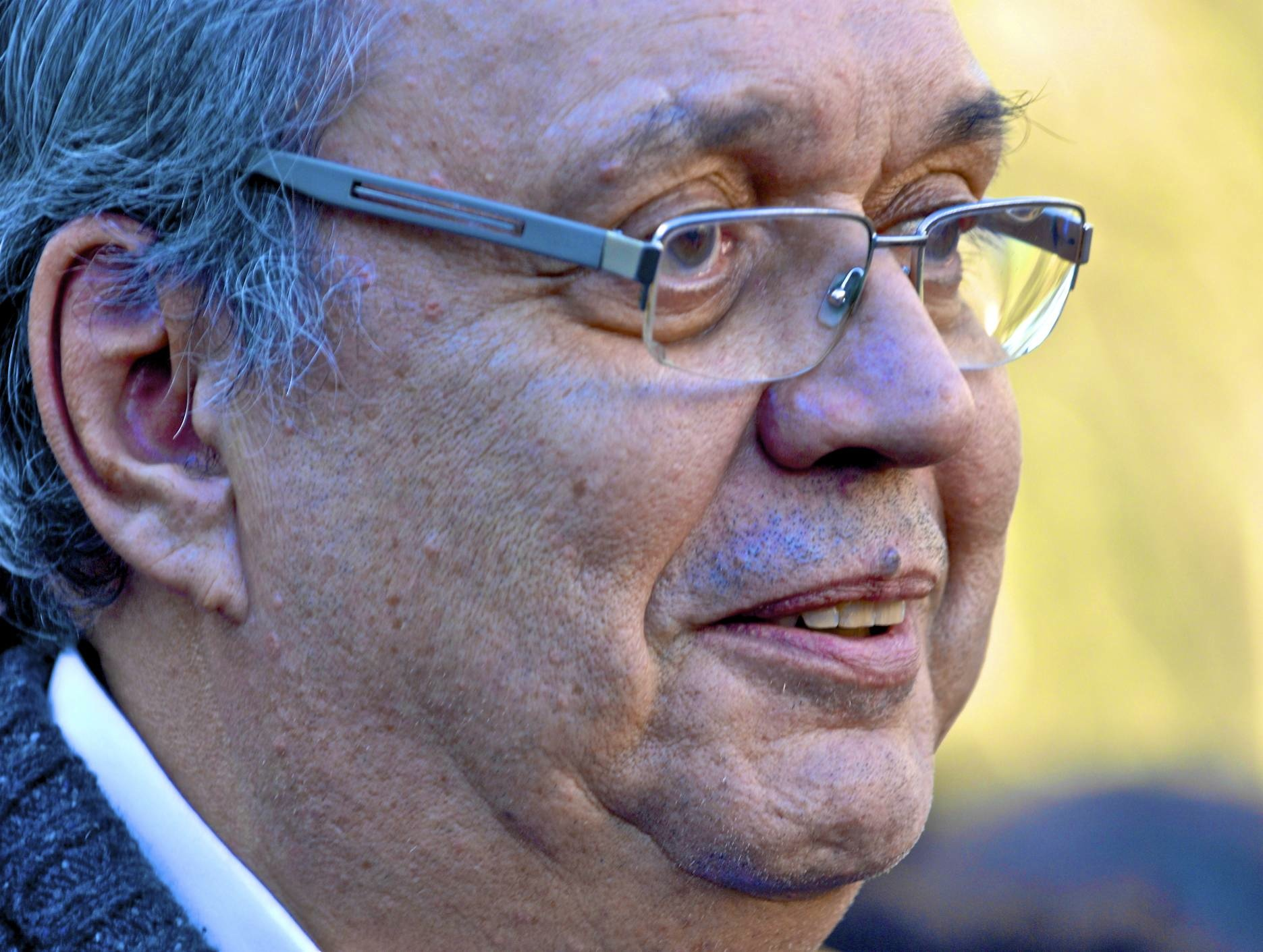

Background information
- Born: 29 March 1948 (age 78); Lisbon, Portugal
- Occupations: Singer, songwriter

Fernando Travassos Tordo (born 29 March 1948) is a Portuguese singer and songwriter. Since 2003, he has been a Commander of the Order of Merit, an honor bestowed on him by the Portuguese President Jorge Sampaio.

Considered one of the most prolific songwriters of the Portuguese songbook, he is deemed by critics as a key figure in Portuguese contemporary music for the extension and originality of his work. Both as a singer and as a songwriter, Fernando Tordo has worked in the realms of fado, música ligeira and political intervention arts.

His lengthy work collaboration with poet José Carlos Ary dos Santos was a mark that propelled him to fame, resulting in songs such as "Tourada", "Estrela da Tarde", "Lisboa Menina e Moça", "Cavalo à Solta", "Balada para os Nossos Filhos", "O Amigo que eu canto", "Meu Corpo" and "Novo Fado Alegre".

As an author and songwriter, he has collaborated with numerous Portuguese and international singers, such as Carlos do Carmo, Mariza, Carminho, Amor Electro, Simone de Oliveira, Beatriz da Conceição, Ana Moura, António Zambujo, Ivan Lins and Dulce Pontes.

As a singer, he represented Portugal at the Eurovision Song Contest in 1973, due to national victory at the Festival RTP da Canção with the songs "Tourada". He won the contest with 115 votes and placed 10th at Eurovision with 80 points.

He celebrated his 77th birthday by releasing a new album, “Tordo com a Banda Sinfónica Portuguesa” which included songs composed over 60 years. He was part of the concert that celebrated the 50th anniversary of the Carnation Revolution at the Coruche Municipal Museum Patio in April 2025.
