= Malta (band) =

Swedish duo

- Origin: Sweden
- Genres: Pop; schlager
- Years active: 1973–2009
- Labels: EMI
- Past members: Claes af Geijerstam; Göran Fristorp

Malta was a Swedish pop duo consisting of Claes af Geijerstam and Göran Fristorp. In 1973, they had to change their band name to the Nova in order to perform at the Eurovision Song Contest 1973 due to potential confusion with the country Malta. They performed the song "You're Summer" in Luxembourg, which achieved 5th place in the contest, with 94 points.

Göran Fristorp died on 3 September, 2024.

Preceded by Family Four with "Härliga sommardag"	Sweden in the Eurovision Song Contest; 1973	Succeeded by ABBA with "Waterloo"
