= Rauno Lehtinen =

Finnish conductor and composer

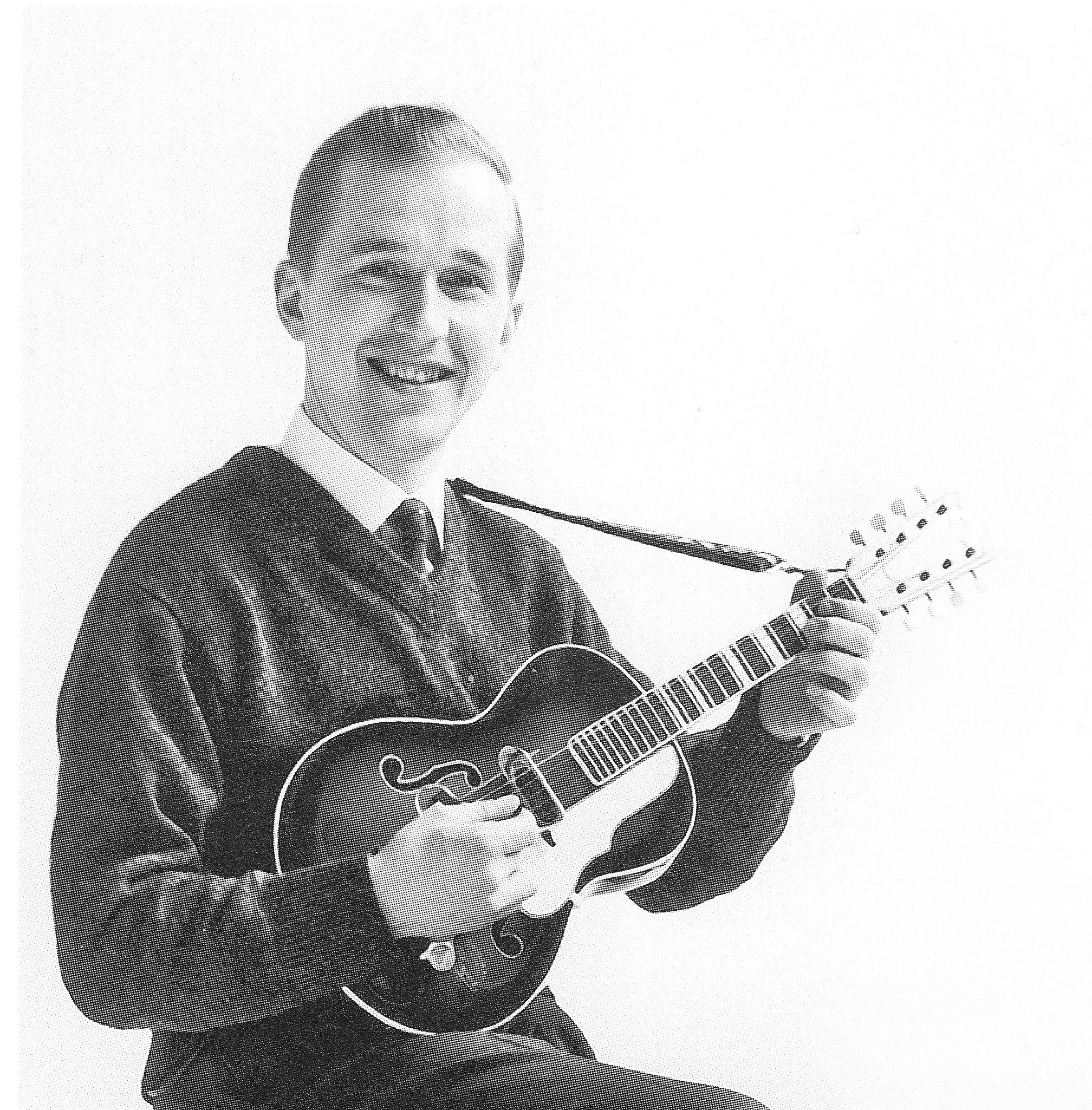
Rauno Lehtinen

Rauno Väinämö Lehtinen (7 April 1932 – 1 May 2006) was a Finnish conductor and composer. He composed the 1960s hit "Letkis" which was based on a folk-dance. "Letkis" was recorded in over 92 countries.

Lehtinen, who was born in Tampere, was also the man behind Tom-tom-tom, which was the most successful Finnish participant (6th) in the Eurovision song contest until 2006. The song was performed by Marion Rung in 1973. He was also the composer of the music to the ident of MTV in 1975. He died in Helsinki.
