= Tu te reconnaîtras =

1973 song by Anne-Marie David

Single by Anne-Marie David

from the album Tu te reconnaîtras
- Language: French
- Released: 1973
- Length: 2:40
- Label: Epic
- Composer: Claude Morgan
- Lyricist: Vline Buggy

Eurovision Song Contest 1973 entry
- Country: Luxembourg
- Artist: Anne-Marie David
- Language: French
- Composer: Claude Morgan
- Lyricist: Vline Buggy
- Conductor: Pierre Cao

Finals performance
- Final result: 1st
- Final points: 129

Entry chronology
- ◄ "Après toi" (1972)
- "Bye Bye I Love You" (1974) ►

Official performance video
- "Tu te reconnaîtras" on YouTube

"Tu te reconnaîtras" (French pronunciation: [ty tə ʁəkɔnɛtʁa]; "You'll Recognise Yourself"), is a song recorded by French singer Anne-Marie David, with music composed by Claude Morgan and lyrics written by Vline Buggy. It represented Luxembourg in the Eurovision Song Contest 1973 held in Luxembourg, winning the contest.

== Background ==
=== Conception ===
"Tu te reconnaîtras" was composed by Claude Morgan with lyrics by Vline Buggy. Anne-Marie David recorded the song in five languages: French, English as "Wonderful Dream", German as "Du bist da", Spanish as "Te reconocerás", and in two entirely different Italian versions entitled "Il letto del re" and "Non si vive di paura" respectively.

=== Eurovision ===
The Compagnie Luxembourgeoise de Télédiffusion (CLT) internally selected "Tu te reconnaîtras" as its entry for the 18th edition of the Eurovision Song Contest.

On 7 April 1973, the Eurovision Song Contest was held at Grand Théâtre in Luxembourg hosted by CLT and broadcast live throughout the continent. Anne-Marie David performed "Tu te reconnaîtras" eleventh on the evening, following Italy's "Chi sarà con te" by Massimo Ranieri and preceding Sweden's "You're Summer" by The Nova. Pierre Cao conducted the event's live orchestra in the performance of the Luxembourgian entry.

At the close of voting, the song had received 129 points, winning the contest in a field of seventeen, and beating the second-placed Spain's entry by 4 points and the United Kingdom's by another 2 points. Spain's "Eres tú" performed by Mocedades and UK's "Power to All Our Friends" by Cliff Richard, would go on to become major hit singles in 1973 –in the case of "Eres tú" worldwide– and are today both widely considered Eurovision classics.

"Tu te reconnaîtras" is the only winning entry of Luxembourg with some level of local involvement. Although both Anne-Marie David, the composer Claude Morgan, and the lyricist Vline Buggy, were all French, the conductor Pierre Cao was Luxembourgish. It was also the first time a country won the contest two years in succession without sharing the victory, as Spain in 1969. It was succeeded as Luxembourg's entry in the 1974 contest by "Bye Bye, I Love You", performed by Ireen Sheer.

=== Aftermath ===
Anne Marie David is one of the few Eurovision winners to return to the contest; in 1979 she represented her native France singing the song "Je suis l'enfant soleil" in Jerusalem and finished in third place after Israel's "Hallelujah" and Spain's "Su canción". David performed "Tu te reconnaîtras" in the Eurovision twenty-fifth anniversary show Songs of Europe held on 22 August 1981 in Mysen. In the Eurovision fiftieth anniversary competition Congratulations: 50 Years of the Eurovision Song Contest, held on 22 October 2005 in Copenhagen, she performed the song as part of the interval acts. She performed the song in the Eurovision sixtieth anniversary show Eurovision Song Contest's Greatest Hits held on 31 March 2015 in London.

== Chart history ==
=== Weekly charts ===
Chart (1973)	Peak position
Belgium (Ultratop 50 Flanders)	6
Belgium (Ultratop 50 Wallonia)	1
Netherlands (Single Top 100)	2
Norway (VG-lista)	2
Switzerland (Schweizer Hitparade)	7
West Germany (GfK)	40

2026 weekly chart performance
Chart (2026)	Peak position
Israel International Airplay (Media Forest)	16

== Legacy ==
In 1973 Turkish pop singer Nilüfer Yumlu brought out a Turkish-language version of the song, entitled "Göreceksin kendini". The song had great success in Turkey. The same year, Finnish singer Katri Helena published a Finnish-language version of the song, "Nuoruus on seikkailu" ("Being Young is an Adventure"). In 1973 singer Věra Špinarová published a Czech-language version of the song, "Zpívej jak já" ("Sing like me") In 1974 singer Irena Jarocka published a Polish-language version of the song, "Ty i ja – wczoraj i dziś" ("You and I – Yesterday and Today").

Preceded by "Après toi" by Vicky Leandros	Eurovision Song Contest winners 1973	Succeeded by "Waterloo" by ABBA
