= Ey Sham =

1973 song by Ilanit

Single by Ilanit
- Language: Hebrew
- Released: 1973
- Composer: Nurit Hirsh
- Lyricist: Ehud Manor

Eurovision Song Contest 1973 entry
- Country: Israel
- Artist: Ilanit
- Language: Hebrew
- Composer: Nurit Hirsh
- Lyricist: Ehud Manor
- Conductor: Nurit Hirsh

Finals performance
- Final result: 4th
- Final points: 97

Entry chronology
- "Natati La Khayay" (1974) ►

"Ey Sham" (Hebrew: אי שם, lit. "Somewhere") is a song by Israeli singer Ilanit, with lyrics by Ehud Manor and music composed by Nurit Hirsh. The song was Israel's debut entry in the Eurovision Song Contest, competing in the 1973 edition, where it achieved 4th place with 97 points. The song also gained popularity in Israel, reaching high positions on the Hebrew national charts and being recorded in multiple languages.

== Lyrics ==
The song is a dramatic ballad, with Ilanit singing about the sudden realization of what she must do with her lover. She suggests that they "go now," in the hope that "somewhere / there together we'll find the garden / the garden of love." With the lyrics "there / I saw a rainbow... the morning rises in white" and "we fly beyond the clouds... we'll ask for the azure gardens," she alludes to a heavenly garden. From the tone of the performance, it appears that this represents a hope for the pair to be themselves without pressure from others.

Ilanit recorded an English-language version of the song entitled "All Make Believe," an Italian version called "Lei," and a German version entitled "Weit so weit der Regenbogen reicht."

== Eurovision Song Contest ==
The song is Israel's debut entry in the annual Eurovision Song Contest and the first occasion on which a country from outside geographical Europe had competed in the contest. This apparent anomaly is explained by the fact that the contest is open to all members of the European Broadcasting Union, an organization that extends beyond Europe.

Written by Ehud Manor and composed by Nurit Hirsh, the two musicians also collaborated to produce the 1978 edition's winning Israeli entry, with Manor producing six more Israeli Eurovision entries. At the contest, the song was also conducted by Hirsh, who, along with the conductor for Sweden, showcased the first Eurovision edition to feature a female conductor for a competing entry.

At the contest, the song was performed seventeenth and last, following France's Martine Clémenceau with "Sans toi." At the close of voting, it had received 97 points, placing fourth in a field of 17, which, for the next 20 years, held the contest's record for the highest placement of a debuting country.

Despite this achievement, Ilanit stated she feels the song could have placed higher, as she discussed an argument over her desire for a composition that "attacks" the listener by starting with the refrain, exploiting the three-minute limitation rule of the contest's entries. This was in contrast to composer Hirsh's decision to arrange the intro as "something artistic and mysterious."

As Israel's first-ever Eurovision entry, Ilanit performed the first part of the song during the opening segment of the final of the 2019 contest in Tel Aviv. The song was succeeded as Israel's representative at the 1974 contest by Poogy with "Natati La Khayay."

== Chart positions ==
"Ey Sham" ranked among the top songs for weeks during 1973 and was a contender for Song of the Year on the two main national Israeli charts for Hebrew songs. These charts included the official one on the radio channel Reshet Gimmel, operated by Kol Yisrael, and the other on the popular radio channel Galgalatz, operated by the Israel Defense Forces Radio, Galei Tzahal.

=== Year-end charts ===
Chart (1973)	Position
Kol Yisrael	2
Galei Tzahal	2
