= I See a Star =

1974 single by Mouth & MacNeal

Single by Mouth & MacNeal
- Released: 1974
- Composer: Hans van Hemert
- Lyricist: Gerrit den Braber

Eurovision Song Contest 1974 entry
- Country: Netherlands
- Artists: Sjoukje Smit-van 't Spijker, Willem Duyn
- As: Mouth & MacNeal
- Language: English
- Composer: Hans van Hemert
- Lyricist: Gerrit den Braber
- Conductor: Harry van Hoof

Finals performance
- Final result: 3rd
- Final points: 15

Entry chronology
- ◄ "De oude muzikant" (1973)
- "Ding-A-Dong" (1975) ►

"I See a Star" (original Dutch title: "Ik zie een ster") is a song written by Hans van Hemert and Gerrit den Braber, and performed by Mouth & MacNeal. It represented the Netherlands in the Eurovision Song Contest 1974, performed in English (the first time the Dutch entry was not entirely in Dutch).

The song was composed by Hans van Hemert and written by Gerrit den Braber, a duo with several previous entries to their credit. Lyrically, the song is a love duet, with the singers telling each other that their love has helped them see the world in a new way. The "star" of the title is in other words to be found in one's lover's eyes. Musically it is a simple melody, which is embellished by a number of different instruments, including a barrel organ with a collection of puppets on it.

The brightly coloured performance has become a favourite among Contest fans, with the song being selected as one of the non-winning "classics" to appear on the double-CD and double-DVD sets produced to support the Congratulations special of late 2005. At one point in the performance, Mouth in fact played the barrel organ himself – something referenced in the Dutch lyrics (dan speel ik er een stukkie orgel bij "then I'll add some organ"). Contest historian and author John Kennedy O'Connor argues in his book The Eurovision Song Contest – The Official History that the "antics" involved in the presentation may ultimately have hurt the song's chances of winning. The winning song at this Contest was "Waterloo" by Sweden's ABBA.

Besides the Dutch and English versions, Mouth & MacNeal also recorded the song in German and French, entitled "Ein goldner Stern" and "L'amour au pas" respectively.

The song was performed twelfth on the night, following Belgium's Jacques Hustin with "Fleur de liberté" and preceding Ireland's Tina Reynolds with "Cross Your Heart". At the close of voting, it had received 15 points, placing third in a field of 17.

It was succeeded as Dutch representative at the 1975 contest by Teach-In with "Ding-A-Dong". Maggie MacNeal returned to the Contest as a solo artist in 1980 with "Amsterdam".

== Charts ==
| Chart (1974) | Peak position |
|---|---|
| Belgium (Ultratop 50 Flanders) | 4 |
| Ireland (IRMA) | 1 |
| Netherlands (Dutch Top 40) | 3 |
| Norway (VG-lista) | 3 |
| UK Singles (Official Charts) | 8 |
