= Long Live Love (Olivia Newton-John song) =

1974 song by Olivia Newton-John

- Cover of the Belgian release

Single by Olivia Newton-John

from the album Long Live Love
- B-side: "Angel Eyes"
- Released: March 1974
- Genre: Pop
- Length: 2:46
- Label: Pye International; EMI
- Songwriters: Valerie Avon; Harold Spiro
- Producer: John Farrar

Olivia Newton-John singles chronology
"Let Me Be There" (1973)	"Long Live Love" (1974)	"If You Love Me (Let Me Know)" (1974)

Eurovision Song Contest 1974 entry
- Country: United Kingdom
- Artist: Olivia Newton-John
- Language: English
- Composers: Valerie Avon; Harold Spiro
- Lyricists: Valerie Avon; Harold Spiro
- Conductor: Nick Ingman

Finals performance
- Final result: 4th
- Final points: 14

Entry chronology
- ◄ "Power to All Our Friends" (1973)
- "Let Me Be the One" (1975) ►

Official performance video
- "Long Live Love" on YouTube

"Long Live Love" is a song by British and Australian singer, songwriter, and actress Olivia Newton-John composed and written by Valerie Avon and Harold Spiro. It represented the United Kingdom in the Eurovision Song Contest 1974 held in Brighton.

== Background ==
=== Conception ===
The song's composers, Valerie Avon and Harold Spiro, had worked together as staff writers for Belwin Mills Publishing since 1970 and had placed songs with several artists: Newton-John had recorded the Avon/Spiro composition "Don't Move Away" as a duet with Cliff Richard, the track serving as B-side to Richard's 1971 hit "Sunny Honey Girl".

=== National selection ===
"Long Live Love" was the third time Avon and Spiro had submitted a co-composition of theirs to the British Broadcasting Corporation (BBC) for consideration for A Song For Europe, its national selection for the Eurovision Song Contest, having finished fourth in a field of six in 1970 with "Can I Believe", and having finished sixth in a field of six in 1971 with "In My World of Beautiful Things".

The BBC had internally selected Olivia Newton-John as its performer for the 19th edition of the Eurovision Song Contest. She introduced one of each of the six nominated songs on a broadcast of Jimmy Savile's Clunk Click television show on BBC One; on 23 February 1974 a television broadcast entitled A Song For Europe 1974 announced the tally of viewers' mailed-in ballots, with "Long Live Love" the clear victor at 27,387 votes, becoming the British entrant for Eurovision. The runner-up, "Angel Eyes" –which was Newton-John's favourite– gained 18,018 votes.

Newton-John made recorded versions of all the songs she had performed for consideration for Eurovision, these tracks making up half of Long Live Love, a December 1974 Olivia Newton-John album release, with "Angel Eyes" being utilized as the B-side of the single release of "Long Live Love." She also recorded a German-language version of "Long Live Love".

=== Eurovision ===
On 6 April 1974, the Eurovision Song Contest was held at The Dome in Brighton hosted by the BBC, and broadcast live throughout the continent. Considered a strong contender, Newton-John performed "Long Live Love" second on the evening, following Finland's "Keep Me Warm" by Carita Holmström and preceding Spain's "Canta y sé feliz" by Peret. The conductor for the British entrant was Nick Ingman and Newton-John was backed by a five-woman chorale which included the Ladybirds, the trio who had sung backup for Sandie Shaw on her victorious performance of "Puppet on a String" in the 1967 contest.

At the close of voting, "Long Live Love" had received 14 points to place in a three-way tie for fourth in a field of 17, with "Bye Bye I Love You" by Ireen Sheer singing for Luxembourg and "Celui qui reste et celui qui s'en va" by Romuald singing for Monaco also having accrued 14 points. Newton-John admitted post-contest: "I was never really happy with the song I had to sing."

"Long Live Love" was succeeded as British entrant at the 1975 contest by "Let Me Be the One" by The Shadows. Olivia Newton-John would be the last solo act to represent the UK at Eurovision until the 1985 contest.

=== Aftermath ===
On 10 August 2022, the Eurovision's official YouTube channel, with permission of the BBC, uploaded the song's Eurovision performance in Brighton in tribute to Newton-John after her death.

== Chart performance ==
In the British Isles "Long Live Love" charted in the UK with a #11 peak and reached #9 in Ireland: the track also afforded Newton-John a #11 hit in her adopted homeland of Australia. In anticipation of a boost from its expected strong Eurovision showing, "Long Live Love" was widely released throughout mainland Europe with the track having its highest global impact in Norway with a three-week chart peak tenure at #3, being kept from #1 by the chart-topping 1974 Eurovision victor "Waterloo" (ABBA) with first "Devil Gate Drive" (Suzi Quatro) and then "Seasons in the Sun" (Terry Jacks) at #2. However "Long Live Love" did not afford Newton-John widespread European success, otherwise charting only on Belgium's Dutch chart (#7) and in Finland (#9).

=== Weekly charts ===
Chart (1974)	Peak position
Australia (Kent Music Report)	11
Belgium (Ultratop 50 Flanders)	7
Belgium (Ultratop 50 Wallonia)	9
Finland (Suomen virallinen lista)	10
Ireland (IRMA)	9
Norway (VG-lista)	3
UK Singles (Official Charts)	11

=== Year-end charts ===
Chart (1974)	Position
Australia (Kent Music Report)	87
Belgium (Ultratop 50 Flanders)	71

== Legacy ==
Renderings of "Long Live Love" in Norwegian and Finnish were recorded by respectively Gluntan ("Det er et sted") and Päivi Paunu ("Kun rakastaa"). Anthony Newley covered the song and it was issued as a single (MGM M12744) in the U.S. in 1974
