= Portugal in the Eurovision Song Contest 1974 =

- Eurovision Song Contest 1974
- Participating broadcaster: Radiotelevisão Portuguesa (RTP)
- Country: Portugal
- Selection process: Grande Prémio TV da Canção Portuguesa 1974
- Selection date: 7 March 1974

Competing entry
- Song: "E depois do adeus"
- Artist: Paulo de Carvalho
- Songwriters: José Calvário; José Niza

Placement
- Final result: 14th, 3 points

Participation chronology

Portugal was represented at the Eurovision Song Contest 1974 with the song "E depois do adeus", composed by José Calvário, with lyrics by José Niza, and performed by Paulo de Carvalho. The Portuguese participating broadcaster, Radiotelevisão Portuguesa (RTP), selected its entry at the Grande Prémio TV da Canção Portuguesa 1974.

== Before Eurovision ==
=== Grande Prémio TV da Canção Portuguesa 1974 ===
Radiotelevisão Portuguesa (RTP) held the Grande Prémio TV da Canção Portuguesa 1974 at the Teatro Maria Matos in Lisbon on 7 March 1974, hosted by Glória de Matos and Artur Agostinho. Ten songs took part in the final. The results were determined by a distrital jury, that had 20 votes each, and a selection jury, composed of nine elements, to vote, each one with 10 votes to distribute among the songs in the contest. For the first time, Funchal was called to vote.

Grande Prémio TV da Canção Portuguesa - 7 March 1974
R/O	Artist	Song	Conductor	Jury		Votes	Place
R/O	Artist	Song	Conductor	Distrital	Selection	Votes	Place
1	Green Windows	"Imagens"	Jorge Machado	39	1	40	3
2	Duo Ouro Negro	"Bailia dos trovadores"	Jorge Machado	28	0	28	4
3	Verónica	"Canção por todos vós"	Jorge Machado	0	0	0	8
4	José Cid	"A rosa que te dei"	Jorge Machado	10	0	10	5
5	Paulo de Carvalho	"E depois do adeus"	José Calvário	159	86	245	1
6	Artur Garcia	"Dona e senhora da boina"	Rafael Ibarbia	0	0	0	8
7	Green Windows	"No dia em que o rei fez anos"	Jorge Machado	141	3	144	2
8	Fernanda Farri	"Cantiga ao vento"	Joaquim Luís Gomes	0	0	0	8
9	Helena Isabel	"Canção solidão"	Thilo Krassmann	2	0	2	6
10	Xico Jorge	"Temos de cantar"	Thilo Krassmann	1	0	1	7

Detailed Distrital Jury Votes
R/O	Song	Aveiro	Beja	Braga	Bragança	Castelo Branco	Coimbra	Évora	Faro	Funchal	Guarda	Leiria	Lisbon	Portalegre	Porto	Santarém	Setúbal	Viana do Castelo	Vila Real	Viseu	Total
1	"Imagens"	2		5	4			3	7			9					2	5	2	9	39
2	"Bailia dos trovadores"	4			4		2	2			7	4		3			2			4	28
3	"Canção por todos vós"																				0
4	"A rosa que te dei"			2				1		4						3					10
5	"E depois do adeus"	8	19	1	4	10	3	9	10	14	6	7	10	7	16	11	8		9	7	159
6	"Dona e senhora da boina"																				0
7	"No dia em que o rei fez anos"	6	1	12	8	10	15	5	2	2	7		10	10	4	6	6	15	9		141
8	"Cantiga ao vento"																				0
9	"Canção solidão"								1								1				2
10	"Temos de cantar"																1				1

Detailed Selection Jury Votes
R/O	Song	A. Andrade	H. Mendes	L. Andrade	M. Pereira	J. M. Santana	P. Rodrigues	I. Cruz	F. Teixeira	B. Domingues	Total
1	"Imagens"	1									1
2	"Bailia dos trovadores"										0
3	"Canção por todos vós"										0
4	"A rosa que te dei"										0
5	"E depois do adeus"	6	10	10	10	10	10	10	10	10	86
6	"Dona e senhora da boina"										0
7	"No dia em que o rei fez anos"	3									3
8	"Cantiga ao vento"										0
9	"Canção solidão"										0
10	"Temos de cantar"										0

== At Eurovision ==
On the night of the final Carvalho performed 16th in the running order, following Switzerland and preceding Italy. The voting system tried between 1971 and 1973 was abandoned, and for 1974 returned to the previous system of ten jury members in each country awarding one vote each.

At the close of the voting the song had received 3 points, placing joint last (along with Germany, Norway, and Switzerland). The orchestra during the Portuguese entry was conducted by José Calvário.

=== Voting ===
Points awarded to Portugal
Score	Country
2 points	Switzerland
1 point	Spain

Points awarded by Portugal
Score	Country
2 points	Israel; Spain
1 point	Greece; Italy; Monaco; Netherlands; Sweden; Yugoslavia

== Aftermath ==
Despite the modest showing in Brighton at the Contest itself, the song achieved considerable fame as one of the two signals to launch the Carnation Revolution in Portugal against the Estado Novo regime of Marcelo Caetano - the other being the folk song "Grândola Vila Morena" by Zeca Afonso, which was the signal for the coup leaders to announce that they had taken control of strategic parts of the country. It was broadcast at 22.55 on 24 April 1974 by 'Emissores Associados de Lisboa'.

Histories of the Contest tend to take a facetious view of this fact. In his Official History of The Eurovision Song Contest author John Kennedy O'Connor, for example, describes it as "the only Eurovision entry to have actually started a revolution", while Des Mangan suggests that other Portuguese entries (he mentions 1998's "Se eu te pudesse abraçar") would not be likely to inspire coups.
