= Netherlands in the Eurovision Song Contest 1974 =

- Eurovision Song Contest 1974
- Participating broadcaster: Nederlandse Omroep Stichting (NOS)
- Country: Netherlands
- Selection process: Artist: Internal selection Song: Nationaal Songfestival 1974
- Selection date: 27 February 1974

Competing entry
- Song: "I See a Star"
- Artist: Mouth and MacNeal
- Songwriters: Hans van Hemert; Gerrit den Braber

Placement
- Final result: 3rd, 15 points

Participation chronology

The Netherlands was represented at the Eurovision Song Contest 1974 with the song "I See a Star", composed by Hans van Hemert, with lyrics by Gerrit den Braber, and performed by duo Mouth and MacNeal (Willem Duyn and Maggie MacNeal). The Dutch participating broadcaster, Nederlandse Omroep Stichting (NOS), selected its entry through a national final, after having previously selected the performer internally.

== Before Eurovision ==
=== Nationaal Songfestival 1974 ===
The final was held on 27 February 1974 at the Jaarbeurs in Utrecht, hosted by Willem Duys. Only three songs were performed and voted on by a jury. "Ik zie een ster" emerged the runaway winner.

Final – 27 February 1974
R/O	Song	Points	Place
1	"Liefste"	19	2
2	"Zoals de oudjes zongen"	12	3
3	"Ik zie een ster"	79	1

== At Eurovision ==
The free-language rule applied in 1974, so prior to the contest the song was translated into English as "I See a Star" and performed in English at the final. On the evening of the final Mouth and MacNeal performed 12th in the running order, following Belgium and preceding Ireland. In 1974, the voting system reverted to the ten jury members in each country with one vote each model, and at the close of voting "I See a Star" had received 15 points from ten countries, placing the Netherlands 3rd of the 17 entries. The Dutch jury awarded its highest score (4) to Greece.

Mouth and MacNeal's upbeat and engaging performance at Eurovision proved memorable, and following the contest "I See a Star" went on to become a major hit across Europe. It reached number 8 on the UK Singles Chart, making it one of only four non-UK / non-winning Eurovision entries to have reached the British top 10 performed by its original artists (the others being "Volare" by Domenico Modugno, third in 1958, and Gigliola Cinquetti's runner-up "Sì", also from 1974, and 2014's "Calm After the Storm" by The Common Linnets, also Dutch).

The Dutch conductor at the contest was Harry van Hoof.

=== Voting ===
Points awarded to the Netherlands
Score	Country
3 point	Sweden; Yugoslavia
2 points	Greece
1 point	Belgium; Finland; Germany; Ireland; Israel; Norway; Portugal

Points awarded by the Netherlands
Score	Country
4 points	Greece
3 points	Sweden
2 points	Israel
1 point	Spain
