= Finland in the Eurovision Song Contest 1974 =

- Eurovision Song Contest 1974
- Participating broadcaster: Yleisradio (Yle)
- Country: Finland
- Selection process: National final
- Selection date: 16 February 1974

Competing entry
- Song: "Keep Me Warm"
- Artist: Carita Holmström
- Songwriters: Eero Koivistoinen; Frank Robson

Placement
- Final result: 13th, 4 points

Participation chronology

Finland was represented at the Eurovision Song Contest 1974 with the song "Keep Me Warm", composed by Eero Koivistoinen, with lyrics by Frank Robson, and performed by Carita Holmström. The Finnish participating broadcaster, Yleisradio (Yle), selected its entry through a national final.

== Before Eurovision ==
Yleisradio (Yle) invited 16 composers for the competition. The Finnish national selection consisted of two semi finals and a final. The shows were hosted by Matti Paalosmaa.

=== Semi-finals ===
The semi-finals were held on 19 and 26 January 1974 at Finlandia Hall in Helsinki. In both semi-finals eight songs competed and four songs qualified for the final. The finalists were chosen by four regional juries. Each jury group consisted of 20 members. In the first semi-final, the regional juries were from Vaasa, Oulu, Simpele and Helsinki. In the second semi-final, the regional juries were from Helsinki, Kauhajoki, Tampere, Jyväskylä.

Semi-final 1 – 19 January 1974
R/O	Artist	Song	Songwriter(s)	Points	Place	Result
1	Eero Raittinen and Jukka Tolonen	"Shangri-La"	Jukka Tolonen; Hector	233	5	—N/a
2	Kisu	"Kun sinä jäät"	Heikki Sarmanto; Chrisse Johansson	215	7	—N/a
3	Eija Ahvo and Harri Saksala	"Häät"	Toni Edelmann; Marja-Kaarina Mykkänen	228	6	—N/a
4	Pepe Willberg	"Sinä ja minä"	Markku Johansson; Vexi Salmi	259	1	Qualified
5	Jukka Kuoppamäki	"Aurinkomaa"	Jukka Kuoppamäki; Ture Ara	247	2	Qualified
6	Markku Aro	"Anna kaikkien kukkien kukkia"	Toivo Kärki; Vexi Salmi	237	4	Qualified
7	Danny	"Jos maailmassa vain ois kahva"	Jaakko Salo; Jukka Virtanen	242	3	Qualified
8	Irwin Goodman	"Se on minimaalista"	Irwin Goodman; Vexi Salmi	195	8	—N/a

Semi-final 2 – 26 January 1974
R/O	Artist	Song	Songwriter(s)	Points	Place	Result
1	Muska and George	"Senhän sanoo järkikin"	Erik Lindström; Sauvo Puhtila	254	2	Qualified
2	Marion Rung	"Icing"	Kari Kuuva; Juha Vainio	238	6	—N/a
3	Anneli Sari	"Jäähyväiset"	Kaj Chydenius; Marja-Leena Mikkola	251	3	Qualified
4	Seija Simola and Lasse Mårtenson	"Laulun kuulen"	Lasse Mårtenson; Pertti Reponen	164	8	—N/a
5	Ritva Oksanen	"Musta tango"	Jorma Panula; M. A. Numminen	250	4	Qualified
6	Carita Holmström	"Älä mene pois"	Eero Koivistoinen; Hector	256	1	Qualified
7	Kirka	"Energia"	Rauno Lehtinen	244	5	—N/a
8	Marjo-Riitta Kervinen	"Voin elää paremmin"	Frank Robson; Ritva Paakkunainen	176	7	—N/a

=== Final ===
The final was held on 16 February 1974 at Finlandia Hall in Helsinki. The winner was chosen by a professional jury consisting of 20 members. Each juror distributed their points between 1–5 points for each song.

In addition to the performances of the competing entries, the interval act featured British singer-songwriter Roger Whittaker performing "Finnish Whistler" (theme song to Patakakkonen, a long-running Finnish cooking show) and "Mamy Blue.

Final – 16 February 1974
R/O	Artist	Song	Points	Place
1	Muska and George	"Senhän sanoo järkikin"	42	6
2	Ritva Oksanen	"Musta tango"	70	2
3	Danny	"Jos maailmassa vain ois kahva"	40	7
4	Pepe Willberg	"Sinä ja minä"	66	3
5	Jukka Kuoppamäki	"Aurinkomaa"	64	4
6	Markku Aro	"Anna kaikkien kukkien kukkia"	37	8
7	Carita Holmström	"Älä mene pois"	83	1
8	Anneli Sari	"Jäähyväiset"	63	5

Detailed Jury Votes
R/O	Song	Martti Lappalainen	Isa Uusisaari	Lauri Karvonen	Klaus Järvinen	Merja Ollakka	Jyrki Kangas	Kauko Kojonen	Kaarlo Kaartinen	Helena Dunkel	Eero Tuominen	Teuvo Salminen	Leena Siniranta	Tuomo Tanska	Per Snellman	Jouko Kykkänen	Seppo Vuorikivi	Matti Rosvall	Anja-Maija Leppänen	Karri Kaksonen	Antti Välikangas	Total
1	"Senhän sanoo järkikin"	2	1	1	2	2	2	2	2	4	2	2	2	2	4	3	4	2	1	1	1	42
2	"Musta tango"	4	4	3	4	4	4	3	4	5	3	4	4	3	3	1	3	2	4	5	3	70
3	"Jos maailmassa vain ois kahva"	3	1	1	3	2	1	3	3	3	3	1	1	3	3	1	1	1	1	2	3	40
4	"Sinä ja minä"	4	1	2	3	5	2	3	5	2	5	4	3	5	1	5	2	3	4	3	4	66
5	"Aurinkomaa"	3	2	1	4	5	3	2	4	3	3	3	3	3	5	3	5	4	1	4	3	64
6	"Anna kaikkien kukkien kukkia"	2	3	2	2	1	1	2	2	1	4	1	2	2	2	2	3	1	1	2	1	37
7	"Älä mene pois"	5	3	3	4	4	4	4	5	4	5	5	4	4	3	4	3	5	4	5	5	83
8	"Jäähyväiset"	3	5	5	3	2	3	2	4	3	1	3	5	4	1	2	4	3	5	4	1	63

The winning song "Älä mene pois" was performed in Finnish in the national selection shows but it was translated into English for the Eurovision Song Contest as "Keep Me Warm". The English lyrics were written by Frank Robson.

== At Eurovision ==
On the night of the final Carita Holmström performed first in the running order, preceding United Kingdom. The entry was conducted by Ossi Runne. At the close of voting, Finland picked up four points and placed 13th of the 17 entries.

=== Voting ===
Points awarded to Finland
Score	Country
2 points	Israel
1 point	Ireland; United Kingdom

Points awarded by Finland
Score	Country
5 points	Sweden
2 points	Italy
1 point	Netherlands; Yugoslavia; United Kingdom
