= Eurovision Song Contest 1974 =

International song competition

Date and venue
- Final: 6 April 1974
- Venue: Brighton Dome; Brighton, United Kingdom

Organisation
- Organiser: European Broadcasting Union (EBU)
- Scrutineer: Clifford Brown

Production
- Host broadcaster: British Broadcasting Corporation (BBC)
- Director: Michael Hurll
- Executive producer: Bill Cotton
- Musical director: Ronnie Hazlehurst
- Presenter: Katie Boyle

Participants
- Number of entries: 17
- Debuting countries: Greece
- Non-returning countries: France
- Participation map: Competing countries Countries that participated in the past but not in 1974

Vote
- Voting system: Ten-member juries in each country; each member gave one vote to their favourite song
- Winning song: Sweden "Waterloo"

The Eurovision Song Contest 1974 was the 19th edition of the Eurovision Song Contest, held on 6 April 1974 at the Brighton Dome in Brighton, United Kingdom, and presented by Katie Boyle. It was organised by the European Broadcasting Union (EBU) and host broadcaster the British Broadcasting Corporation (BBC), who staged the event after Compagnie Luxembourgeoise de Télédiffusion (CLT), which had won the 1973 contest for Luxembourg, declined hosting responsibilities as it had staged the competition in 1973. The BBC took over as host after Televisión Española (TVE), which had finished second for Spain in 1973, declined the offer when approached, with the EBU ultimately choosing the BBC over bids from the Israel Broadcasting Authority (IBA) and the BBC's commercial rival ITV. This was the fourth time that the BBC had staged the contest after another broadcaster declined – following the 1960, 1963 and 1972 contests – and the fifth time overall including 1968.

Entries representing eighteen countries were submitted for the contest, with Greece making its first appearance. However, France ultimately did not participate as the contest coincided with the death of French president Georges Pompidou, and with a national day of mourning scheduled for the date of the contest the French broadcaster, Office de Radiodiffusion Télévision Française (ORTF), deemed participating in the event to be inappropriate. The voting system used between 1971 and 1973 was scrapped, and was replaced by the system last used in 1970, with ten people in each country awarding one vote to their favourite song.

The winner was Sweden, with the song "Waterloo", composed by Benny Andersson and Björn Ulvaeus, written by Stig Anderson and performed by ABBA. Italy and the Netherlands finishing second and third respectively, followed by a three-way tie for fourth place between Luxembourg, Monaco and the United Kingdom. It was Sweden's first contest win. After previous success within European markets with "Ring Ring", with which ABBA had attempted to represent Sweden in 1973, "Waterloo" gave the group their first global hit, and their Eurovision win was a launching point for ABBA to become one of the world's best-selling music artists. Olivia Newton-John, who represented the United Kingdom at this event, would also go on to achieve worldwide success in the years following the contest.

== Location ==
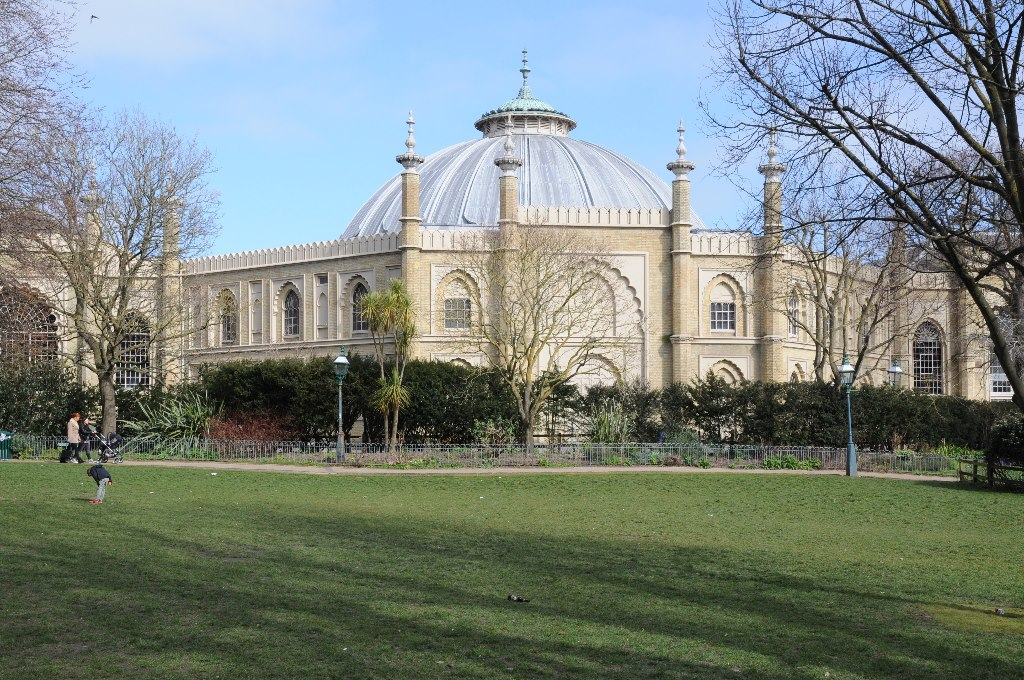
The Concert Hall of the Brighton Dome, Brighton – host venue of the 1974 contest

The 1974 contest was held in Brighton, United Kingdom. It was the fifth time that the United Kingdom had hosted the contest, having previously done so in 1960, 1963, 1968, and 1972. The selected venue was the Dome, completed in 1805 and originally built for the Prince Regent as stables and a riding school for his personal use. Sold by Queen Victoria in 1850, the stables were converted into a concert hall and assembly rooms in 1867, and the riding school into a market for corn merchants in 1868. The concert hall could normally seat up to 2,102 people, but for the contest some seating was removed for the commentator booths and technical equipment, leaving space for an audience of just over 1,000 people.

Among the other venues considered to stage the event by the BBC were the Royal Opera House and Royal Albert Hall in London, the latter of which had previously staged the 1968 contest. Both venues proved to be unavailable however, with the broadcaster then looking outside of the capital for potential venues. The Dome was then ultimately selected, and this choice was announced publicly by the BBC and EBU in July 1973.

=== Host selection ===
The 1973 contest was won by Luxembourg, represented by Compagnie Luxembourgeoise de Télédiffusion (CLT), with the song "Tu te reconnaîtras" performed by Anne-Marie David, which according to Eurovision tradition made CLT the presumptive host of the 1974 contest. The broadcaster had staged the event on three previous occasions, in 1962, 1966, and 1973, each time in Luxembourg City. As CLT had hosted the event the previous year, it declined the opportunity to stage the event for a second consecutive year due to the financial strain such an undertaking would entail. Spain, which had come second in 1973, was also considered as a potential host for the event, however Televisión Española (TVE) also turned down the opportunity to stage the 1974 contest; TVE had previously hosted the event in 1969.

The European Broadcasting Union (EBU) originally asked the British Broadcasting Corporation (BBC), as the participating broadcaster which came third the previous year, not to make an offer at this initial stage in order to determine if other participating broadcasters were willing to stage the event. Of the four previous events held by the BBC three of these had been staged in place of the previous year's winning broadcaster, specifically the 1960, 1963, and 1972 events. Two offers were subsequently made, from the Israel Broadcasting Authority (IBA) and from the BBC's commercial rival ITV. Concerns were raised about the prospect of hosting the event in Israel; they had just joined the contest in 1973 and it was felt some countries would not be prepared to accept an Israeli-held contest. Israel was also some distance geographically from the core of Western European nations which participated in the event at this time, and IBA still lagged behind many European broadcasters from a technological perspective. A successful ITV bid would have effectively barred the BBC from participating, as only one entry from a given country can participate in the event, resulting in the BBC submitting a counter-offer which the EBU accepted on 7 June 1973.

== Participants ==
Eurovision Song Contest 1974 – Participation summaries by country
- Belgium; Finland; ~~France~~; Germany; Greece; Ireland; Israel; Italy; Luxembourg; Monaco; Netherlands; Norway; Portugal; Spain; Sweden; Switzerland; United Kingdom; Yugoslavia

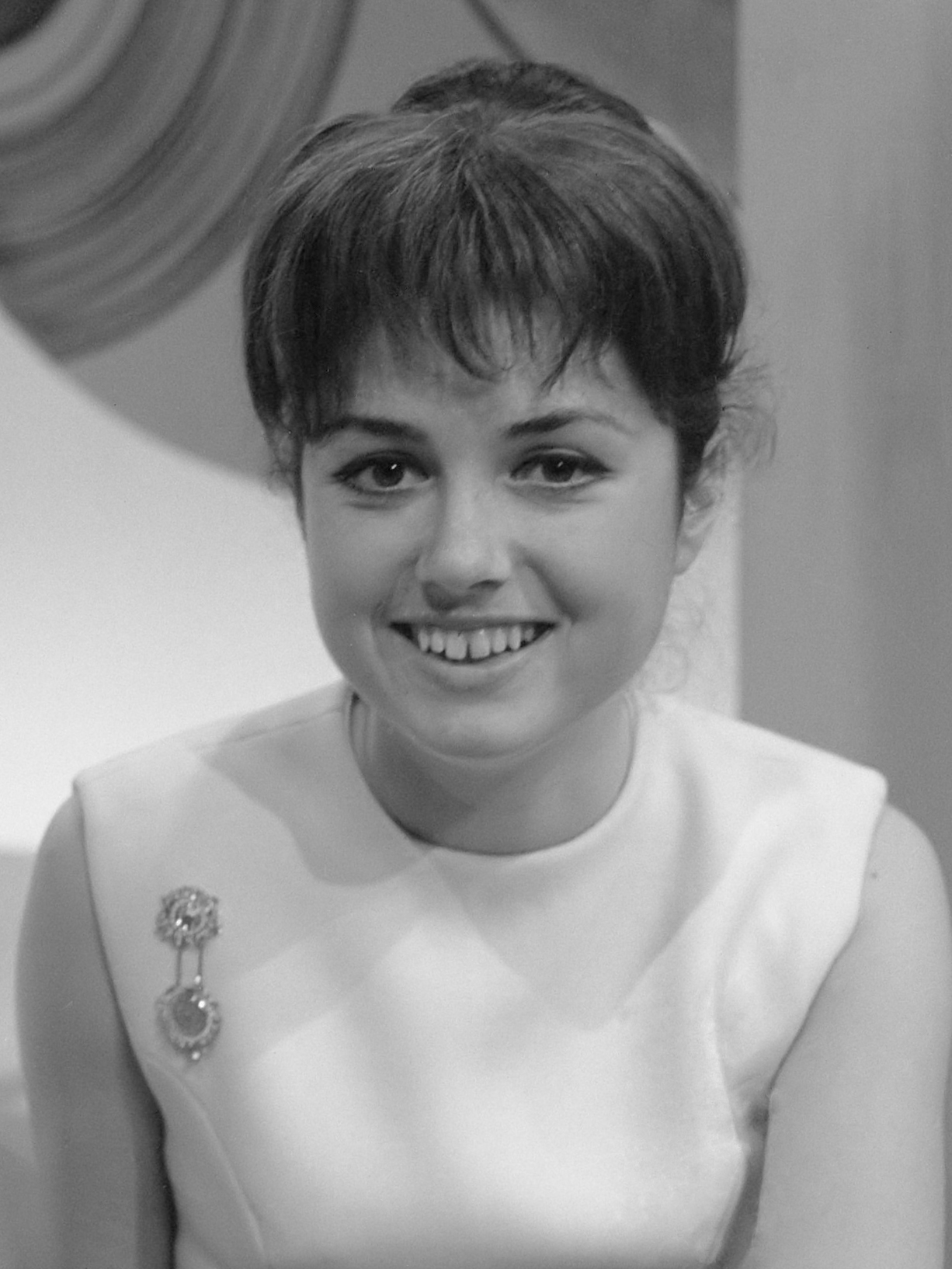
Gigliola Cinquetti (pictured in 1966) who had won the contest for Italy in 1964, participated again this year.

Broadcasters from a total of eighteen countries submitted entries to compete in this edition of the contest, comprising all seventeen countries which had participated in 1973, and Greece, which was making its first appearance in the contest. Turkish broadcaster, the Turkish Radio and Television Corporation (TRT), had also expressed an interest in competing but it had been too late in submitting its request to the EBU and was subsequently informed that, as the scoreboard with space for eighteen countries had already been constructed, its planned entry would not have been possible. Ultimately, however, only seventeen participating entries were performed at the contest, as French broadcaster, Office de Radiodiffusion Télévision Française (ORTF), made the decision to withdraw from the event due to the death of French president Georges Pompidou on 2 April. With the state memorial service and a national day of mourning scheduled to be held on the same day as the contest, it was deemed by ORTF that competing in and broadcasting the contest would be inappropriate. France would have been represented by the song "La vie à vingt-cinq ans", written by Christine Fontaine and to have been performed by Dani, with Jean-Claude Petit scheduled to conduct the orchestra during the performance.

Among the participating artists were a number of acts which had competed in the Eurovision Song Contest in previous years: Italy's Gigliola Cinquetti had previously won the contest for Italy in 1964 with the song "Non ho l'età"; Romuald, representing Monaco, had previously represented both Monaco in 1964 and Luxembourg in 1969; and Norway's Bendik Singers, supporting Anne-Karine Strøm at this event, had represented Norway in 1973, with Strøm having also been a member of the group in that contest.

Eurovision Song Contest 1974 participants
Country	Broadcaster	Artist	Song	Language	Songwriter(s)	Conductor
Belgium	RTB	Jacques Hustin	"Fleur de liberté"	French	Franck F. Gérald; Jacques Hustin	Pierre Chiffre
Finland	YLE	Carita	"Keep Me Warm"	English	Eero Koivistoinen; Frank Robson	Ossi Runne
Germany	HR (Note: On behalf of the German public broadcasting consortium ARD)	Cindy and Bert	"Die Sommermelodie"	German	Kurt Feltz; Werner Scharfenberger	Werner Scharfenberger
Greece	EIRT	Marinella	"Krassi, thalassa ke t' agori mu" (Κρασί, θάλασσα και τ' αγόρι μου)	Greek	Giorgos Katsaros; Pythagoras	Giorgos Katsaros
Ireland	RTÉ	Tina Reynolds	"Cross Your Heart"	English	Paul Lyttle	Colman Pearce
Israel	IBA	Poogy	"Natati La Khaiai" (נתתי לה חיי)	Hebrew	Alon Oleartchik; Danny Sanderson	Yonatan Rechter
Italy	RAI	Gigliola Cinquetti	"Sì"	Italian	Corrado Conti; Daniele Pace; Mario Panzeri; Lorenzo Pilat	Gianfranco Monaldi
Luxembourg	CLT	Ireen Sheer	"Bye Bye I Love You"	French	Humbert Ibach; Michael Kunze; Ralph Siegel	Charles Blackwell
Monaco	TMC	Romuald	"Celui qui reste et celui qui s'en va"	French	Jean-Pierre Bourtayre; Michel Jourdan	Raymond Donnez
Netherlands	NOS	Mouth and MacNeal	"I See a Star"	English	Gerrit den Braber; Hans van Hemert	Harry van Hoof
Norway	NRK	Anne-Karine and the Bendik Singers	"The First Day of Love"	English	Philip Kruse; Frode Thingnæs	Frode Thingnæs
Portugal	RTP	Paulo de Carvalho	"E depois do adeus"	Portuguese	José Calvário; José Niza	José Calvário
Spain	TVE	Peret	"Canta y sé feliz"	Spanish	Pedro Pubill Calaf	Rafael Ibarbia
Sweden	SR	ABBA	"Waterloo"	English	Stig Anderson; Benny Andersson; Björn Ulvaeus	Sven-Olof Walldoff
Switzerland	SRG SSR	Piera Martell	"Mein Ruf nach dir"	German	Pepe Ederer	Pepe Ederer
United Kingdom	BBC	Olivia Newton-John	"Long Live Love"	English	Valerie Avon; Harold Spiro	Nick Ingman
Yugoslavia	JRT	Korni Grupa	"Generacija '42" (Генерација '42)	Serbo-Croatian	Kornelije Kovač	Zvonimir Skerl

== Production and format ==
The Eurovision Song Contest 1974 was produced by the BBC. Bill Cotton served as executive producer, Michael Hurll served as producer and director, John Burrowes served as designer, and Ronnie Hazlehurst served as musical director, leading the BBC Concert Orchestra. A separate musical director could be appointed by each participating delegation to lead the orchestra during its country's performance, with the host musical director also available to conduct for those which did not appoint their own conductor. On behalf of the EBU, the event was overseen by Clifford Brown as scrutineer.

Each participating broadcaster submitted one song, which was required to be no longer than three minutes in duration. As with the previous year's event, artists were able to perform in any language, and not necessarily that of the country they represented. A maximum of six performers were allowed on stage during each country's performance. Each entry could utilise all or part of the live orchestra and could use instrumental-only backing tracks, however any backing tracks used could only include the sound of instruments featured on stage being mimed by the performers.

Rehearsals in the contest venue began on Tuesday 2 April, involving technical rehearsals with the production team, the orchestra, and tests of the voting system and scoreboard. This was followed by rehearsals with the competing acts over subsequent days. The first rehearsals for all countries were held over two days on 3 and 4 April, with each participating act having a 50-minute slot on stage to perform through their entry with the orchestra without stage costumes. A second round of rehearsals, this time in costume, was held for all acts on 5 April, with each country given 20 minutes on stage, followed that evening by a complete run-through of the whole show, including dummy voting. Further technical rehearsals were held on the morning of 6 April, and a second full dress rehearsal was held that afternoon; this rehearsal was also recorded for use as a back-up in case technical failure meant the contest could not go ahead as planned.

Security in Brighton was tight in the lead-up to, and during, the contest, due to the threat of actions by Irish republican militants. There was an increased police presence, and tanks could be seen in the streets of Brighton during the week of the contest. The contest presenter Katie Boyle also recalled being ferried in bulletproof coaches between the hotel and the contest venue, each time taking a different route.

=== Voting procedure ===
Due in part to the closeness of the voting in the previous year's contest, a new voting system was planned to be introduced for this event, which incorporated elements from the two previous voting systems used in the contest: each participating broadcaster would assemble a jury comprising ten members, which would be based in their own country, with each member awarding between one and five votes for each song, with no abstentions allowed and without the option to vote for their own country's entry. This would have resulted in each country potentially awarding a maximum of 50 votes and a minimum of 10 votes to any other country's song; with eighteen planned participating countries, this would have meant that the highest possible score any country could have received was 850, and the lowest possible score was 170. In case of a tie between two or more countries for first place, these acts would have performed again and each country not involved in the tie would have had one vote each to determine the winner. A lottery element to the voting, in order to add greater suspense, was also devised: the order of the voting would have been determined on stage during the voting segment, with cards being drawn at random to decide the order in which countries would vote.

During rehearsals however, it quickly became apparent to the organisers that they had misjudged how long it would take to conduct this new voting system, as well as mounting concerns that any issues with totalling the scores live could exacerbate the problems. Although a computerised system to calculate each country's total had been investigated, this was rejected for cost reasons. Ultimately the contest's executive producer Bill Cotton took the unilateral decision to abandon the proposed voting system and, given the jury structure of ten people had already been established and jury members had most likely already been recruited by the broadcasters, determined that the only alternative was to revert to the scoring system last used in 1970: each of the ten jury members had one vote to award to their favourite song. The lottery aspect of the voting system was, however, retained, although due to timing and sound quality reasons this draw was held before the contest by the EBU's scrutineer Clifford Brown.

== Contest overview ==
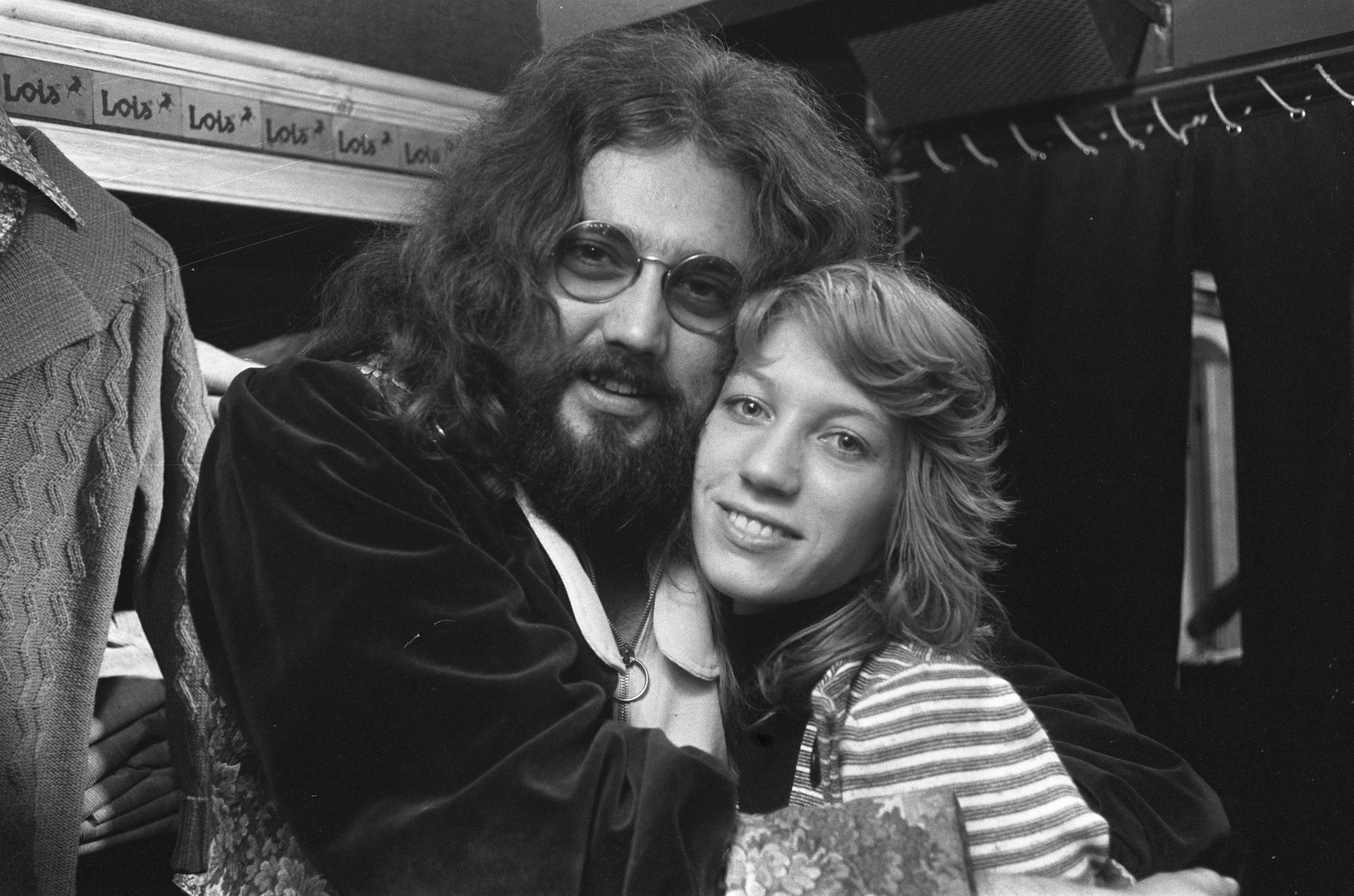
Prior to the event, Dutch duo Mouth and MacNeal were considered among the favourites to win the contest.

The contest was held on 6 April 1974, beginning at 21:30 (BST) and lasting 1 hour and 49 minutes. The contest was presented by the British television presenter and actress Katie Boyle, who had previously presented the contest in 1960, 1963 and 1968. Having hosted the contest four times, Boyle holds the record for most contest appearances as a presenter as of 2025. Following the confirmation of the eighteen planned participating countries, the draw to determine the running order (R/O) of the contest was held on 5 December 1973; prior to its withdrawal, France was scheduled to perform in fourteenth position, between the entries from Ireland and Germany.

The interval act was a pre-recorded video montage featuring the Wombles, a novelty pop band based on the children's characters, in various locations across Brighton. The medallions awarded to the winning songwriters were presented by the Director-General of the BBC and the President of the EBU, Charles Curran.

The winner was Sweden represented by the song "Waterloo", composed by Benny Andersson and Björn Ulvaeus, written by Stig Anderson and performed by ABBA. It was Sweden's first contest win.

Results of the Eurovision Song Contest 1974
R/O	Country	Artist	Song	Votes	Place
1	Finland	Carita	"Keep Me Warm"	4	13
2	United Kingdom	Olivia Newton-John	"Long Live Love"	14	4
3	Spain	Peret	"Canta y sé feliz"	10	9
4	Norway	Anne-Karine and the Bendik Singers	"The First Day of Love"	3	14
5	Greece	Marinella	"Krassi, thalassa ke t' agori mou"	7	11
6	Israel	Poogy	"Natati La Khaiai"	11	7
7	Yugoslavia	Korni Grupa	"Generacija '42"	6	12
8	Sweden	ABBA	"Waterloo"	24	1
9	Luxembourg	Ireen Sheer	"Bye Bye I Love You"	14	4
10	Monaco	Romuald	"Celui qui reste et celui qui s'en va"	14	4
11	Belgium	Jacques Hustin	"Fleur de liberté"	10	9
12	Netherlands	Mouth and MacNeal	"I See a Star"	15	3
13	Ireland	Tina Reynolds	"Cross Your Heart"	11	7
14	Germany	Cindy and Bert	"Die Sommermelodie"	3	14
15	Switzerland	Piera Martell	"Mein Ruf nach dir"	3	14
16	Portugal	Paulo de Carvalho	"E depois do adeus"	3	14
17	Italy	Gigliola Cinquetti	"Sì"	18	2

=== Spokespersons ===
Each participating broadcaster appointed a spokesperson, connected to the contest venue via telephone lines and responsible for announcing, in English or French, the votes for its respective country. Known spokespersons at the 1974 contest are listed below.

- Finland – Aarre Elo
- Ireland – Brendan Balfe
- Monaco – Sophie Hecquet
- Sweden – Sven Lindahl
- United Kingdom – Colin Ward-Lewis
- Yugoslavia – Helga Vlahović

== Detailed voting results ==
Jury voting was used to determine the votes awarded by all countries. The announcement of the results from each country was conducted in a predetermined order chosen at random, with the spokespersons announcing their country's votes in English or French in performance order. The detailed breakdown of the votes awarded by each country is listed in the tables below, with voting countries listed in the order in which they presented their votes.

Detailed voting results of the Eurovision Song Contest 1974
		Total score	Finland	Luxembourg	Israel	Norway	United Kingdom	Yugoslavia	Greece	Ireland	Germany	Portugal	Netherlands	Sweden	Spain	Monaco	Switzerland	Belgium	Italy
Contestants	Finland	4			2		1			1									
Contestants	United Kingdom	14	1					4	1	1	2						1	1	3
Contestants	Spain	10		1		2					1	2	1			3			
Contestants	Norway	3												1		1		1	
Contestants	Greece	7										1	4	2					
Contestants	Israel	11					2			1		2	2	1					3
Contestants	Yugoslavia	6	1									1			1			1	2
Contestants	Sweden	24	5	1	2	2		1		1	2	1	3		1		5		
Contestants	Luxembourg	14			2			2	1	3	1				1	1		1	2
Contestants	Monaco	14		2	1	1				1	2	1		1	2		1	2	
Contestants	Belgium	10		3		2			5										
Contestants	Netherlands	15	1		1	1		3	2	1	1	1		3				1	
Contestants	Ireland	11		2	1	2	1							2	2	1			
Contestants	Germany	3							1								1	1	
Contestants	Switzerland	3					1				1							1	
Contestants	Portugal	3													1		2		
Contestants	Italy	18	2	1	1		5			1		1			2	4		1	

== Broadcasts ==
Broadcasters competing in the event were required to relay the contest via its networks; non-participating EBU member broadcasters were also able to relay the contest. Broadcasters were able to send commentators to provide coverage of the contest in their own native language and to relay information about the artists and songs to their television viewers.

In addition to the participating nations, which, with the exception of Italy, all broadcast the contest live on television, the contest was also reportedly aired, live or deferred, by broadcasters in Algeria, Austria, Bulgaria, Cyprus, Czechoslovakia, France, Hungary, Japan, Jordan, Iceland, Morocco, Poland, South Korea, the Soviet Union and Tunisia. In addition to television coverage, participating broadcasters in Belgium, Finland, Germany, Ireland, Norway, Spain, Sweden, Switzerland and the United Kingdom were also reported to have relayed the contest via radio. Although the script for the contest's opening remarks by Katie Boyle and the press suggested that around 500 million viewers were expected to watch and listen to the contest, the EBU later put the actual estimated figure for the total audience at 231 million.

Known details on the broadcasts in each country, including the specific broadcasting stations and commentators are shown in the tables below.

Broadcasters and commentators in participating countries
Country	Broadcaster	Channel(s)	Commentator(s)	Ref.
Belgium	RTB	RTB	Paule Herreman	
Belgium	RTB	RTB 1		
Belgium	BRT	BRT, BRT 1	Herman Verelst	
Finland	YLE	TV1, Yleisohjelma	Matti Paalosmaa	
Finland	YLE	Ruotsinkielinen ohjelma	Åke Grandell	
Germany	ARD	Deutsches Fernsehen		
Greece	EIRT	EIRT		
Ireland	RTÉ	RTÉ	Mike Murphy	
Ireland	RTÉ	RTÉ Radio		
Israel	IBA	Israeli Television		
Italy	RAI	Secondo Programma TV, (Note: Delayed broadcast on 6 June 1974 at 21:15 (CEST)) Secondo Programma	Rosanna Vaudetti	
Luxembourg	CLT	RTL Télé-Luxembourg		
Netherlands	NOS	Nederland 2	Willem Duys	
Norway	NRK	NRK Fjernsynet	John Andreassen	
Norway	NRK	NRK (Note: Deferred broadcast at 23:00 (CET))	Erik Heyerdahl	
Portugal	RTP	I Programa	Artur Agostinho	
Portugal	ENR	Emissora Nacional Programa 1		
Spain	TVE	TVE 1	José Luis Uribarri	
Spain	RNE	Radio Nacional	Carlos Tena	
Spain	RNE	Radio Peninsular de Huelva		
Spain	Cadena SER (Note: Simulcast on Radio Castellón, Radio Girona, Radio Murcia, Radio San Sebastián, Radio Sevilla, and Radio Valladolid.)			
Sweden	SR	TV1	Johan Sandström	
Sweden	SR	SR P3	Ursula Richter	
Switzerland	SRG SSR	TV DRS	Theodor Haller	
Switzerland	SRG SSR	TSR	Georges Hardy	
Switzerland	SRG SSR	TSI		
Switzerland	SRG SSR	DRS 1 (Note: Delayed broadcast on 9 April 1974 at 21:30 (CET))	Max Rüeger	
Switzerland	SRG SSR	RSR 1	Robert Burnier	
Switzerland	SRG SSR	Radio Monte Ceneri		
United Kingdom	BBC	BBC1	David Vine	
United Kingdom	BBC	BBC Radio 2 (Note: Simulcast on BBC Radio 1, BBC Radio Birmingham, BBC Radio Blackburn, BBC Radio Carlisle, BBC Radio Cleveland, BBC Radio Derby, BBC Radio Humberside, BBC Radio Leicester, BBC Radio London, BBC Radio Newcastle, BBC Radio Nottingham, BBC Radio Oxford, and BBC Radio Stoke.)	Terry Wogan	
United Kingdom	BFBS	BFBS Radio	Richard Astbury	
Yugoslavia	JRT	TV Beograd 1		
Yugoslavia	JRT	TV Koper-Capodistria		
Yugoslavia	JRT	TV Ljubljana 1		
Yugoslavia	JRT	TV Zagreb 1		

Broadcasters and commentators in non-participating countries
Country	Broadcaster	Channel(s)	Commentator(s)	Ref.
Austria	ORF	FS2	Ernst Grissemann	
France	ORTF	Première Chaîne (Note: Delayed shortened broadcast on 9 April 1974 at 20:30 (CET), lasting one hour and ten minutes and featuring only the participating entries, with no postcards, voting sequence or winner's reprise, followed by the announcement of the winner by Pierre Tchernia and a pre-recorded presentation of the planned French entry, "La Vie à vingt-cinq ans" by Dani.)	Pierre Tchernia	
Hungary	MTV	MTV1 (Note: Delayed broadcast on 25 May 1974 at 21:45 (CET))		
Iceland	RÚV	Sjónvarpið (Note: Delayed broadcast on 22 April 1974 at 20:30 (WET))	Kristmann Eiðsson	
Japan	Fuji Television (Note: Delayed broadcast on 29 April 1974)		Shizue Abe and Ben Okano	
Malta	MBA	National Network	Victor Aquilina	
Netherlands Antilles	Voz di Aruba (Note: Delayed broadcast on 5 May 1974 at 17:00 (ADT))			
Poland	TP	TP1 (Note: Delayed broadcast on 11 January 1975 at 23:15 (CET))		
Poland	PR	PR1 (Note: Delayed broadcast in a shortened format on 5 May 1974 at 21:00 (CET))		
South Korea	KBS	KBS (Note: Delayed broadcast on 19 June 1974 at 19:45 (KST))		
Romania	TVR	Programul 1 (Note: Delayed broadcast on 20 April 1974 at 22:15 (EET))		
Turkey	TRT	TRT Televizyon, Radyo 2		

== Legacy ==
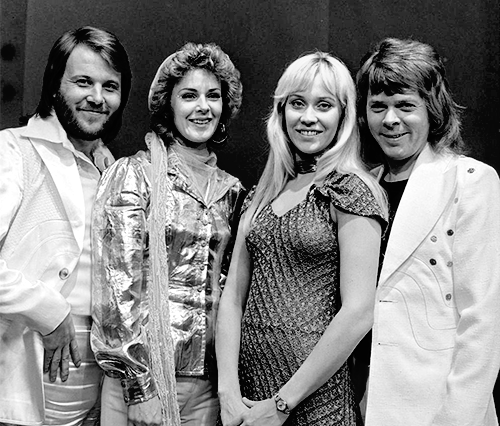
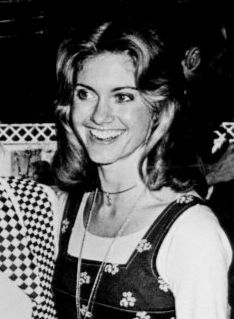
ABBA (left) and Olivia Newton-John (right) both achieved considerable worldwide success after representing Sweden and the United Kingdom, respectively, in the 1974 contest.

The 1974 contest has retrospectively gained notability for a number of aspects, particularly due to the success of some of the competing acts, as well as political developments within Europe that have indirect links to this edition of the event. Two competing artists at this year's event, in particular, went on to sustained worldwide success after the contest: Sweden's ABBA and the United Kingdom's Olivia Newton-John.

The individual members of ABBA had made previous attempts to reach Eurovision, participating in Sweden's national selection, Melodifestivalen, several times, both as a group and individually. Anni-Frid Lyngstad participated in Melodifestivalen 1969, placing fourth with the song "Härlig är vår jord", while Benny Andersson competed in the same edition as a songwriter, placing second with the song "Hej clown" performed by Jan Malmsjö. Andersson and Björn Ulvaeus subsequently competed as a songwriting partnership in 1972, penning the Lena Andersson song "Säg det med en sång", which placed third. Following the formation of ABBA, the group (performing under the name "Björn & Benny, Agnetha & Anni-Frid") competed in Melodifestivalen 1973 with the song "Ring Ring", which ultimately placed third. While "Ring Ring" was popular within European markets, wider success for the group, particularly in English-speaking markets, proved elusive, and the group saw Eurovision as a launchpad for exposure among these markets, resulting in a further attempt to get to the contest in 1974. Although "Waterloo" had been written with Eurovision in mind, the group also considered submitting the song "Hasta Mañana" to Swedish broadcaster Sveriges Radio (SR), as the latter song was felt to be more in-line with the songs that had done well in Eurovision in previous years. Ultimately, however, "Waterloo" was chosen, given it was more likely to be unlike other entries submitted, and therefore would stand out more; "Hasta Mañana" was also mainly sung only by Agnetha Fältskog, whereas with "Waterloo" all four members of the group could give their vocals to the song.

Following the group's win, "Waterloo" went on to top the charts in multiple European countries, including the UK singles chart, as well as reaching the top ten in the Billboard Hot 100. Long-term success for the group, however, did not materialise until the release of "SOS" in 1975, which allowed the group to shrug off a perception of being "one-hit wonders" and led to a string of hits through the rest of the 1970s and early 1980s, which catapulted the foursome to become one of the best-selling music groups of all time. ABBA's international success within the global music scene, starting from their Eurovision win, additionally led to a large growth in the accessibility of Swedish pop music worldwide, with Sweden often considered a superpower in the realm of music export and claims made by the 2000s of being the third-largest exporter of music globally, behind only the United States and the United Kingdom.

Olivia Newton-John was in the early stages of her career when she was approached by the BBC to represent the United Kingdom at Eurovision; she had achieved previous success in the charts in both the UK and US, particularly with country pop songs, and had been a frequent guest on the It's Cliff Richard show, fronted by two-time Eurovision entrant for the United Kingdom Cliff Richard. Newton-John had performed six songs at that year's A Song for Europe contest, with "Long Live Love" being chosen by the viewing public through postcard voting; although it was considered a favourite to win the contest, she later told the press after placing fourth that she felt the wrong song had been chosen and that she would have preferred to have performed a ballad. Newton-John subsequently achieved considerable success in the United States and global recognition after starring in the musical films Grease (1978) and Xanadu (1980).

Following the contest, the Portuguese entry, "E depois do adeus" by Paulo de Carvalho, played a large part in the launching of the Carnation Revolution, which ultimately led to the overthrow of the authoritarian Estado Novo regime, setting Portugal along a path towards the reestablishment of democracy and ending the country's war with its African colonies. The radio broadcast of the song on the evening of 24 April 1974 was used as a signal to alert rebelling officers in the Portuguese army to begin the coup, which kicked off overnight following the playing of another song, "Grândola, vila morena" by José Afonso, in the early hours of 25 April.

The Italian broadcaster, Radiotelevisione italiana (RAI), did not air the contest for two months due to the content of its own entry. The contest coincided with the campaigning period for a referendum on abolishing divorce within the country, which was held a month after the contest, and there were fears that the Italian entry, "Sì" ("Yes") by Gigliola Cinquetti, could have been seen as an attempt to sway the result of the vote. The contest was, however, available to watch in parts of northern Italy where transmissions of Swiss and Yugoslav Italian-language television were accessible. The contest was eventually broadcast on RAI on 6 June 1974, a month after the referendum.

"Waterloo" was subsequently nominated in 2005 to compete in Congratulations: 50 Years of the Eurovision Song Contest, a special broadcast to determine the contest's most popular entry of its first 50 years as part of the contest's anniversary celebrations. One of 14 entries chosen to compete, "Waterloo" was ultimately declared the winner of the competition over two rounds of jury and public voting.

== Notes and references ==
=== Bibliography ===
- Johansson, Ola (December 2010). "Beyond ABBA: The Globalization of Swedish Popular Music". Focus on Geography. 53 (4): 134–141. doi:10.1111/j.1949-8535.2010.00016.x.
- Murtomäki, Asko (2007). Finland 12 points! Suomen Euroviisut (in Finnish). Helsinki, Finland: Teos. ISBN 978-951-851-106-2.
- O'Connor, John Kennedy (2010). The Eurovision Song Contest: The Official History (2nd ed.). London, United Kingdom: Carlton Books. ISBN 978-1-84732-521-1.
- Roxburgh, Gordon (2014). Songs for Europe: The United Kingdom at the Eurovision Song Contest. Vol. Two: The 1970s. Prestatyn, United Kingdom: Telos Publishing. ISBN 978-1-84583-093-9.
- Thorsson, Leif; Verhage, Martin (2006). Melodifestivalen genom tiderna : de svenska uttagningarna och internationella finalerna [Melodifestivalen through the ages: the Swedish selections and international finals] (in Swedish). Stockholm, Sweden: Premium Publishing. ISBN 91-89136-29-2.
- West, Chris (April 2020). Eurovision! A History of Modern Europe Through the World's Greatest Song Contest (Updated ed.). London, United Kingdom: Melville House UK. ISBN 978-1-911545-55-2.
