= E depois do adeus =

1974 song by José de Carvalho

Single by Paulo de Carvalho

from the album Paulo
- Language: Portuguese
- B-side: "Versão orquestral"
- Released: 1974
- Genre: Ballad
- Length: 3:18
- Label: Ofreu
- Composer: José Calvário
- Lyricist: José Niza
- Producers: José Calvário; José Niza

Paulo de Carvalho singles chronology
"I'll Be There With You" (1973)	"E depois do adeus" (1974)	"Dia a Dia" (1974)

Eurovision Song Contest 1974 entry
- Country: Portugal
- Artist: Paulo de Carvalho
- Language: Portuguese
- Composer: José Calvário
- Lyricist: José Niza
- Conductor: José Calvário

Finals performance
- Final result: 14th
- Final points: 3

Entry chronology
- ◄ "Tourada" (1973)
- "Madrugada" (1975) ►

"E depois do adeus" (English: "And After the Farewell") is a song recorded by Portuguese singer Paulo de Carvalho, with music composed by José Calvário and lyrics by José Niza. It represented Portugal in the Eurovision Song Contest 1974, held in Brighton, having previously won that year's Grande Prémio TV da Canção Portuguesa.

The song's airing on 24 April 1974 at 10:55 p.m. on Emissores Associados de Lisboa Radio Station was one of the two secret signals which alerted the rebel captains and soldiers to begin the Carnation Revolution.

== Background ==
=== Conception ===
"E depois do adeus" was composed by José Calvário with lyrics by José Niza, and recorded by Paulo de Carvalho. The song is a ballad, with him taking the role of a man who is faced with the end of a relationship. He tells his lover how he feels, likening her to "a flower that I picked", implying that the relationship was of a comparatively short duration. He also comments on the nature of love itself, singing that it is "winning and losing".

De Carvalho also recorded an English-language version of the song titled "(And then) After love".

=== Eurovision ===
On 7 March 1974, "E depois do adeus" performed by de Carvalho competed in the 11th edition of the Grande Prémio TV da Canção Portuguesa. It received 245 points, winning the competition. As the festival was used by Radiotelevisão Portuguesa (RTP) to select their song and performer for the 19th edition of the Eurovision Song Contest, the song became the Portuguese entry, and de Carvalho the performer, for Eurovision.

On 6 April 1974, the Eurovision Song Contest was held at The Dome in Brighton hosted by the British Broadcasting Corporation (BBC), and broadcast live throughout the continent. De Carvalho performed "E depois do adeus" sixteenth on the night, following Switzerland's "Mein Ruf nach dir" by Piera Martell and preceding Italy's "Sì" by Gigliola Cinquetti. José Calvário conducted the live orchestra in the performance of the Portuguese entry.

At the close of voting, it had received 3 points, placing fourteenth –tying for last with Switzerland, Norway, and Germany– in a field of 17. It was succeeded as Portuguese entry at the 1975 contest by "Madrugada" by Duarte Mendes.

== Carnation revolution ==
Despite the modest placing in Eurovision, the song achieved considerable fame as one of the two signals to launch the Carnation Revolution in Portugal against the Estado Novo regime under Américo Tomás and Marcello Caetano – the other being the folk song "Grândola, Vila Morena" by Zeca Afonso, which was the signal for the coup leaders to announce that they had taken control of strategic parts of the country. "E depois do adeus" was broadcast at 22.55 on 24 April 1974 by Emissores Associados de Lisboa.

Histories of the contest tend to take a facetious view of this fact. In his The Eurovision Song Contest: The Official History, author John Kennedy O'Connor, for example, describes it as "the only Eurovision entry to have actually started a revolution", while Des Mangan suggests that other Portuguese entries (he mentions 1998's "Se eu te pudesse abraçar") would not be likely to inspire coups.
