= Long Live Love =

Long Live Love may refer to:

- Long Live Love, a 1923 painting by Max Ernst
- Long Live Love (album), a 1974 album by Olivia Newton-John
  - "Long Live Love" (Olivia Newton-John song), title track from the album
- "Long Live Love" (Chris Andrews song), a hit single for Sandie Shaw
- "Long Live Love" (LeAnn Rimes song), a 2016 single from Remnants
- Long, Live, Love, a 2019 album by Kirk Franklin
- Vive l'amour, a 1994 Taiwanese romantic film by Tsai Ming-liang
