= United Kingdom in the Eurovision Song Contest 1974 =

- Eurovision Song Contest 1974
- Participating broadcaster: British Broadcasting Corporation (BBC)
- Country: United Kingdom
- Selection process: Artist: Internal selection Song: A Song for Europe 1974
- Selection date: 23 February 1974

Competing entry
- Song: "Long Live Love"
- Artist: Olivia Newton-John
- Songwriters: Valerie Avon; Harold Spiro

Placement
- Final result: 4th, 14 points

Participation chronology

The United Kingdom was represented at the Eurovision Song Contest 1974 with the song "Long Live Love", written by Valerie Avon and Harold Spiro, and performed by Olivia Newton-John. The British participating broadcaster, the British Broadcasting Corporation (BBC), selected its entry through a national final, after having previously selected the performer internally. In addition, the BBC was also the host broadcaster and staged the event at the Dome in Brighton, after the winner of the previous edition, the Compagnie Luxembourgeoise de Télédiffusion (CLT) from Luxembourg, opted not to host the event.

== Before Eurovision ==
=== A Song for Europe 1974 ===
The show was held on 23 February 1974 and presented by Jimmy Savile as part of the BBC1 TV series Clunk, Click... As It Happens, with Olivia Newton-John selected to perform all of the entries, in part due to the recommendation of her close friend Cliff Richard. Originally, as with 1973, Cilla Black's 1974 nine-part BBC series was scheduled to feature the 'Song for Europe' process, but Black was uncomfortable at promoting another female singer (Newton-John) each week throughout the series' run and in a rather last minute decision, the BBC arranged to move the process to another show. This necessitated a truncating of the regularly established format of the chosen artist performing one song a week on the given series, so it was planned that Newton-John would perform two songs a week for three weeks once the series started. However, a BBC strike led to the cancellation of the first show, so another revision was needed and Olivia performed three songs a show over two programmes. In the final, her performances were immediately repeated before viewers were asked to cast votes via postcards through the mail to choose the winner. An extremely low postal vote led to "Long Live Love" winning with just 27,387 votes.

A Song for Europe 1974 – 24 February 1974
| R/O | Song | Songwriter(s) | Votes | Place |
|---|---|---|---|---|
| 1 | "Have Love, Will Travel" | Roger Greenaway; Geoff Stephens | 15,266 | 4 |
| 2 | "Lovin' You Ain't Easy" | Stuart Leathwood; Bob Saker; Gary Sulsh | 5,905 | 5 |
| 3 | "Long Live Love" | Valerie Avon; Harold Spiro | 27,387 | 1 |
| 4 | "Someday" | Gary Benson; David Mindel | 5,520 | 6 |
| 5 | "Angel Eyes" | Tony Macaulay; Keith Potger | 18,108 | 2 |
| 6 | "Hands Across the Sea" | Ben Findon; Geoff Wilkins | 15,365 | 3 |

=== Chart success ===
The top two songs from the contest were released on single, reaching No. 11 in the UK Singles Chart, the first UK entry since 1966 not to reach the top ten, or indeed, the top four. Newton-John had just signed a new international recording contract with EMI, who released the single in most territories, but it was released on Pye International in the UK as the final commitment of her previously existing contract. All six songs were included on her debut EMI album Long Live Love released later in 1974, although these tracks were dropped from the US release If You Love Me, Let Me Know. Subsequently, all six songs became available on CD compilations. Newton-John recorded a German version of the winning song and Marion Rung recorded a Finnish version "Kun rakastaa". Marie Toland and 'Stephanie' recorded French versions of the winner and several others from the UK selection. Dana, Jimmy Jones and The Dooleys recorded other tracks from the UK final.

== At Eurovision ==
"Long Live Love" went on to tie for fourth place in the contest.

The Eurovision Song Contest was broadcast live on BBC 1 with sports presenter David Vine undertaking the television commentary, whilst Terry Wogan returned to providing the radio commentary on BBC Radio 2. British Forces Radio also provided a broadcast with commentary provided by Richard Astbury. The contest was seen by over 8 million viewers.

=== Voting ===
Points awarded to the United Kingdom
| Score | Country |
|---|---|
| 4 points | Yugoslavia |
| 3 points | Italy |
| 2 points | Germany |
| 1 point | Belgium; Finland; Greece; Ireland; Switzerland |

Points awarded by the United Kingdom
| Score | Country |
|---|---|
| 5 points | Italy |
| 2 points | Israel |
| 1 point | Finland; Ireland; Switzerland |
