= Senlis (disambiguation) =

Senlis is a commune in the Oise département of France.

Senlis may also refer to:

== Places ==
- Senlis, Pas-de-Calais, France
- Senlis-le-Sec, France

== People ==
- Simon I de Senlis, Earl of Huntingdon-Northampton (died c. 1111), Norman nobleman
- Simon II de Senlis, Earl of Huntingdon-Northampton (c. 1098–1153), Norman nobleman
- Michelle Senlis (1933–2020), French lyricist

== See also ==
- The International Council on Security and Development, formerly known as the Senlis Council, an international think tank
- Treaty of Senlis, 1493
