= Maxi (singer) =

Irish musician and radio presenter (born 1950)

- Born: Irene McCoubrey; 23 February 1950 (age 76)
- Occupations: Musician (1964–2011); Radio presenter (1985–2015)
- Musical career
- Instruments: Violin; singing
- Years active: 1964–2011
- Formerly of: Maxi, Dick and Twink; Sheeba; The Concerned

Maxi (born Irene McCoubrey, 23 February 1950) is a former musician and radio presenter in Ireland. Maxi performed with two girl groups and the Irish supergroup The Concerned in the 1970s–80s, also representing Ireland at the 1973 and 1981 Eurovision Song Contests. After an automobile accident left her hospitalised, she focused on presenting for RTÉ; she retired from the broadcaster in 2015 after 30 years.

== Personal life ==
The third and final child of Madge and Sam, Maxi was born Irene McCoubrey on 23 February 1950. She grew up in Harold's Cross, and was given her nickname due to the letters "McC" in her surname. As of February 2015, she had only been married once, from 1973 to 1979, and bore no children. In addition to her work in media, Maxi was a UNICEF Ireland representative. As of December 2011, she lived in Blackrock.

== Music ==
As a child, Maxi and Sam played the violin, and Madge played the piano. In addition to singing with the Little Dublin Singers and Young Dublin Singers, Maxi sang in the school choir at St Louis High School, Rathmines.

When Eamonn Andrews wanted to create a girl group to sing backing vocals for his recording studio, he chose Maxi, Adele King, and Barbara Dixon because of how the combined singing voices sounded; the girls became Maxi, Dick and Twink based on all their respective nicknames. Maxi credited this imposed friendship with drawing 14-year-old McCoubrey out of her shyness. The group proved very popular outside Andrews' studio, and toured internationally (once to Mainz with chaperone Maeve Binchy). After seven years performing together, the group disbanded when they began developing conflicting goals. In 2015, Maxi told the Irish Independent that the three "are still getting along today. [...] We're still friends, and chat and e-mail all the time."

At 23 years old, Maxi was chosen to represent Ireland at the Eurovision Song Contest 1973, performing "Do I Dream". At the competition in Luxembourg, Maxi and the Irish delegation disagreed on the arrangement of the song. When Maxi refused to perform, RTÉ panicked and sent Tina Reynolds to compete in her stead, giving the replacement singer only the flight from Ireland to rehearse the song. Ultimately, Maxi performed and received tenth place. Reynolds would represent Ireland the following year with "Cross Your Heart", placing seventh.

In the late 1970s, Maxi applied to join the new girl group Sheeba. Though she was initially turned down due to her age (28), she eventually joined Marion Fossett and Frances Campbell as the third member of "Ireland's first sexy girl group." At Eurovision 1981, Sheeba came in fifth, singing "Horoscopes". After traveling to Holland and London to record tracks for a new album, the three women of Sheeba were hospitalized at Mayo University Hospital after a traffic collision in Castlebar; Maxi's head injury caused amnesia and needed more than 100 surgical sutures, Fossett received facial injuries, and Campbell had a collapsed lung. Sheeba were dropped by their record label after their recovery took too long, and though the three tried to succeed independently, the group ultimately broke up.

In 1985, Maxi joined the Irish supergroup The Concerned to perform and record the charity record "Show Some Concern" in support of Concern Worldwide; the song was a number-one hit in March and April 1985. The Concerned also included Dave Fanning, Pat Kenny, Gerry Ryan, Linda Martin, Christy Moore, Mary Black, Adele King, Maura O'Connell, Freddie White, Eamon Carr, Johnny Duhan, Dave King, Clannad, The Blades, Stockton's Wing, The Golden Horde, and Those Nervous Animals. The music video was filmed at Windmill Lane Recording Studios.

While she was bedridden in 2010–11, Maxi wrote 26 songs with Charlie McGettigan; McGettigan later recorded two, while Clara Rose Monahan recorded a third.

== Radio ==
Maxi was fascinated by radio since childhood. After the traffic accident that caused the fall of Sheeba, Maxi ventured into radio presenting on two inspirations. Firstly, Pete Murray had told a younger Maxi that "she had a beautiful radio voice"; secondly, medical treatment after the crash required shaving her head, and working on radio afforded her the opportunity to perform without being seen.

In autumn 1994, Maxi hosted a BBC Radio 2 programme on Saturdays. Maxi presented Late Date (from midnight until 2 a.m.) on RTÉ 2fm for eleven years, worked on Thames' Name That Tune, was the first woman presenter of Rapid Roulette, and for the eleven years prior to October 2011—when she fell ill—she had hosted Risin' Time on RTÉ Radio 1 from 5:30–7 a.m. After 30 years of employment, Maxi officially retired from RTÉ on 23 February 2015.

Awards and achievements
Preceded by Sandie Jones with "Ceol an Ghrá"	Ireland in the Eurovision Song Contest; 1973	Succeeded by Tina Reynolds with "Cross Your Heart"
