= Spain in the Eurovision Song Contest 1974 =

- Eurovision Song Contest 1974
- Participating broadcaster: Televisión Española (TVE)
- Country: Spain
- Selection process: Internal selection
- Announcement date: Artist: 14 February 1974; Song: 4 March 1974

Competing entry
- Song: "Canta y sé feliz"
- Artist: Peret
- Songwriter: Pedro Pubill Calaf

Placement
- Final result: 9th, 10 points

Participation chronology

Spain was represented at the Eurovision Song Contest 1974 with the song "Canta y sé feliz", written and performed by Peret. The Spanish participating broadcaster, Televisión Española (TVE), internally selected its entry for the contest. The song, performed in position 3, placed ninth –tying with the song from Belgium– out of seventeen competing entries with 10 points.

== Before Eurovision ==
Televisión Española (TVE) internally selected "Canta y sé feliz" written and performed by Peret as its entry for the Eurovision Song Contest 1974. Peret was announced as the performer on 14 February 1974. The song was released on 4 March.

On 3 April 1974, TVE broadcast on TVE 1 a special program dedicated to Peret, directed by Miguel Lluch, filmed on location in Madrid and in La Mancha.

== At Eurovision ==
On 6 April 1974, the Eurovision Song Contest was held at The Dome in Brighton hosted by the British Broadcasting Corporation (BBC), and broadcast live throughout the continent. Peret performed "Canta y sé feliz" 3rd in the evening, following the United Kingdom and preceding Norway. He was accompanied on stage by Consuelo Pubill, Teresa Pubill, Antonio Valentí, Juan Calabuch, and Pedro Reyes as backing singers and palmeros. Since his hands were full playing guitar into a standing microphone, Peret had to sing into a handheld microphone attached to his tie. Rafael Ibarbia conducted the event's orchestra performance of the Spanish entry. At the close of voting "Canta y sé feliz" had received 10 points, placing 9th in a field of 17 –tying with the song from Belgium–.

TVE broadcast the contest in Spain on TVE 1 with commentary by José Luis Uribarri. Before the event, TVE aired a talk show hosted by Antolín García introducing the Spanish jury from Prado del Rey.

=== Voting ===
TVE assembled a jury panel with ten members, with each member giving one vote to their favourite song. The following members comprised the Spanish jury:

- Analía Gadé – actress (chairperson)
- Paloma Aleixandre – conference hostess
- Gonzalo Tormos – sales manager
- Cionín Villagrá – figure skating champion
- Diego Serrano – theatre director
- Gabriel de la Casa – bullfighter
- Elisa Ramírez – actress
- Tomy Osinaga – dressmaker
- José Ramón Ortiz – student
- Gracia María González – student

Votes awarded to Spain
| Score | Country |
|---|---|
| 3 votes | Monaco |
| 2 votes | Norway; Portugal |
| 1 vote | Germany; Luxembourg; Netherlands |

Votes awarded by Spain
| Score | Country |
|---|---|
| 2 votes | Ireland; Italy; Monaco |
| 1 vote | Luxembourg; Portugal; Sweden; Yugoslavia |
