= Rafael Ibarbia =

Spanish composer and music director (1931–2003)

- Born: Rafael Ibarbia Serra; 1931; Barcelona, Spain
- Died: 13 January 2003 (aged 71–72); Madrid, Spain
- Occupations: Conductor, composer, arranger, pianist, and music director
- Spouse: Adelaida Ruiz Cárdenas

Rafael Ibarbia Serra (1931 – 13 January 2003), was a Spanish conductor, composer, pianist, and music director. He worked for twenty-seven years in Televisión Española (TVE) as music director, conductor, and arranger.

== Career ==
He conducted the Spanish winning entry in the Eurovision Song Contest at the 1968 contest, "La La La" sung by Massiel. The orchestral arrangement he made was totally right as it accelerated the pace of the song gaining strength. He also conducted another five Spanish entries in the contest in different years: At the 1963 contest he conducted "Algo prodigioso" sung by José Guardiola, at the 1964 contest he conducted "Caracola" sung by Nelly with Tim and Tony, at the 1966 contest he conducted "Yo soy aquél" sung by Raphael, at the 1974 contest he conducted "Canta y sé feliz" sung by Peret, and at the 1977 contest he conducted "Enséñame a cantar" sung by Micky.

He conducted the Spanish winning entry in the OTI Festival at the 1976 contest, "Canta cigarra" sung by María Ostiz. He was the musical director of the 1977 contest, which was held in Madrid, and conducted "Al nacer cada enero", sung by Fernando Casado, representing the Dominican Republic, "Enséñame a vivir", sung by Ana Marcela D'Antonio, representing El Salvador, "El verbo amar", sung by Mildred y Manolo, representing Guatemala, "El hombre", sung by Tony Morales, representing Honduras, "Gente eres tú", sung by Ced Ride, representing the Netherlands Antilles, and "Canta a la vida", sung by Leopoldo Hernández, representing Panama. He also conducted the Spanish entry at the 1974 contest, "Lapicero de madera" sung by Lia Uyá.

He was the musical director of numerous Televisión Española (TVE) shows, such as Gente joven and Gran parada. He was also the musical director of the Benidorm Song Festival in several editions. He made more than 3,000 music recordings of various genres, from classical music to flamenco. He recorded several albums with the RTVE Symphony Orchestra.

== Selected filmography ==
Year	Title	Notes
1958	Habanera	
1964	La chica del gato	
1971	El armario del tiempo	
