= Sweden in the Eurovision Song Contest 1974 =

- Eurovision Song Contest 1974
- Participating broadcaster: Sveriges Radio (SR)
- Country: Sweden
- Selection process: Melodifestivalen 1974
- Selection date: 9 February 1974

Competing entry
- Song: "Waterloo"
- Artist: ABBA
- Songwriters: Benny Andersson; Björn Ulvaeus; Stig Anderson

Placement
- Final result: 1st, 24 points

Participation chronology

Sweden was represented at the Eurovision Song Contest 1974 with the song "Waterloo", composed by Benny Andersson and Björn Ulvaeus, with lyrics by Stig Anderson, and performed by the group ABBA, comprising Andersson, Ulvaeus, Anni-Frid Lyngstad, and Agnetha Fältskog. The Swedish participating broadcaster, Sveriges Radio (SR), selected its entry for the contest through Melodifestivalen 1974. The song, that was originally performed in Swedish in the national final, was translated into English for Eurovision, something the rules allowed between 1973 and 1976.

ABBA was one of the favourites to win the 1974 contest, held in Brighton, United Kingdom. They sang in slot No. 8. In the voting, they received high points from the first jury to vote (Finland), but it was a close race until the third last jury, Switzerland, gave Sweden enough points to secure victory. Sweden received a total of 24 points, compared to runner-up Italy's 18. This was the first victory for Sweden. In 2005, in the 50th anniversary show Congratulations, Waterloo was chosen the best Eurovision song ever.

== Before Eurovision ==
=== Melodifestivalen 1974 ===
Melodifestivalen 1974 (on-screen title Melodifestival 1974) was the selection for the 15th song to represent Sweden at the Eurovision Song Contest. It was the 14th time that Sveriges Radio (SR) used this system of picking a song. Ten songwriters were selected by SR for the competition. The final was held in the SR television studios in Stockholm on 9 February 1974, presented by Johan Sandström and was broadcast on TV1 but was not broadcast on radio. ABBA went on to win that year's Eurovision Song Contest in Brighton, Sweden's first Eurovision victory.

R/O	Artist	Song	Songwriter(s)	Points	Place
1	Lena Ericsson	"En enda jord"	Håkan Elmquist	185	3
2	Östen Warnerbring	"En mysig vals"	Bengt Hallberg, Östen Warnerbring	10	10
3	Göran Fristorp	"Jag minns dej nog"	Georg Riedel, Stig Claesson	16	7
4	Titti Sjöblom	"Fröken Ur sång"	Torgny Söderberg	148	4
5	ABBA	"Waterloo"	Benny Andersson, Björn Ulvaeus, Stig Anderson	302	1
6	Lasse Berghagen	"Min kärlekssång till dig"	Lasse Berghagen	211	2
7	Inger Öst	"En grön dröm om dej"	Bo Sylvén, Bo Carlgren, Bitte Carlgren	61	5
8	Sylvia Vrethammar and Göran Fristorp	"En dröm är en dröm"	Lars Färnlöf, Lasse Bagge	31	6
9	Lena Bergqvist	"Den sista sommaren av mitt liv"	Björn Isfält, Lena Bergqvist	11	9
10	Glenmarks	"I annorlunda land"	Bengt-Arne Wallin, Anja-Notini-Wallin	15	8

==== Voting ====
R/O	Song	Luleå	Falun	Karlstad	Gothenburg	Umeå	Örebro	Norrköping	Malmö	Sundsvall	Växjö	Stockholm	Total
1	"En enda jord"	10	20	15	6	11	10	30	21	15	24	23	185
2	"En mysig vals"	5	0	0	0	0	0	0	4	1	0	0	10
3	"Jag minns det nog"	7	0	0	1	0	2	0	0	0	0	6	16
4	"Fröken Ur sång"	12	18	19	14	14	20	10	12	7	15	7	148
5	"Waterloo"	26	27	24	35	41	26	34	16	32	24	17	302
6	"Min kärlekssång till dej"	26	21	20	25	17	18	12	14	22	18	18	211
7	"En grön dröm om dej"	2	1	9	3	4	9	4	11	9	3	6	61
8	"En dröm är en dröm"	1	0	0	5	0	1	0	9	3	4	8	31
9	"Den sista sommaren av mitt liv"	0	0	2	0	3	4	0	0	0	0	2	11
10	"I annorlunda land"	1	3	1	1	0	0	0	3	1	2	3	15

== At Eurovision ==
=== Voting ===
Each participating broadcaster assembled a jury of ten people. Every jury member could give one point to his or her favourite song.

Points awarded to Sweden
Score	Country
5 points	Finland; Switzerland
3 points	Netherlands
2 points	Germany; Israel; Norway
1 point	Ireland; Luxembourg; Portugal; Spain; Yugoslavia

Points awarded by Sweden
Score	Country
3 points	Netherlands
2 points	Greece; Ireland
1 point	Israel; Monaco; Norway

== Congratulations: 50 Years of the Eurovision Song Contest ==
"Waterloo" was one of fourteen Eurovision songs chosen by fans to compete in the Congratulations 50th anniversary special in 2005. The contest was broadcast on SVT with commentary by Pekka Heino. It was the only Swedish entry featured in the show, although several Swedish entrants were featured (including Swedish winners Carola and Richard Herrey of Herreys). "Waterloo" appeared seventh in the running order, following "Nel blu dipinto di blu" by Domenico Modugno and preceding "Fly on the Wings of Love" by the Olsen Brothers. At the end of the first round, it was announced that "Waterloo" had advanced to the second round along with four other songs. It was later revealed that "Waterloo" won the first round with 331 points. This included 18 sets of the maximum twelve points, including from Sweden (who, unlike in usual contests, were allowed to vote for their own entry). Coincidentally, the first proper competing Eurovision song to receive a record 18 top marks was a Swedish entry: "Euphoria" by Loreen, the winning song of the 2012 contest.

"Waterloo" went on to win the second round and the anniversary contest as a whole, scoring 329 points.

=== Voting ===
Points awarded to "Waterloo" (Round 1)
Score	Country
12 points	Andorra; Austria; Belgium; Croatia; Denmark; Finland; Germany; Latvia; Lithuania; Monaco; Norway; Poland; Portugal; Russia; Serbia and Montenegro; Slovenia; Sweden; Ukraine
10 points	Cyprus; Iceland; Ireland; Netherlands; Spain; Switzerland
8 points	Bosnia and Herzegovina; Israel; Macedonia; Malta; Romania; Turkey
7 points	Greece
6 points	
5 points	
4 points	
3 points	
2 points	
1 points	

Points awarded to "Waterloo" (Round 2)
Score	Country
12 points	Andorra; Austria; Belgium; Denmark; Finland; Iceland; Latvia; Monaco; Netherlands; Norway; Poland; Russia; Slovenia; Spain; Sweden; Switzerland; Ukraine
10 points	Croatia; Cyprus; Ireland; Israel; Lithuania; Macedonia; Malta; Serbia and Montenegro
8 points	Bosnia and Herzegovina; Romania; Turkey
7 points	Germany; Greece; Portugal
6 points	
