= Sì (Gigliola Cinquetti song) =

1974 song by Gigliola Cinquetti

Single by Gigliola Cinquetti

from the album Gigliola Cinquetti
- Language: Italian
- B-side: "Il Pappagallo Verde"
- Released: 1974
- Label: CGD
- Songwriters: Mario Panzeri; Daniele Pace; Lorenzo Pilat; Corrado Conti

Eurovision Song Contest 1974 entry
- Country: Italy
- Artist: Gigliola Cinquetti
- Language: Italian
- Composers: Mario Panzeri; Daniele Pace; Lorenzo Pilat; Corrado Conti
- Lyricists: Mario Panzeri; Daniele Pace; Lorenzo Pilat; Corrado Conti
- Conductor: Gianfranco Monaldi

Finals performance
- Final result: 2nd
- Final points: 18

Entry chronology
- ◄ "Chi sarà con te" (1973)
- "Era" (1975) ►

"Sì" ("Yes") is a song recorded by Italian singer Gigliola Cinquetti, with music composed and Italian lyrics written by Mario Panzeri, Daniele Pace, Lorenzo Pilat, and Corrado Conti. It represented Italy in the Eurovision Song Contest 1974 held in Brighton, placing second. In order not to interfere with the campaigning for the 1974 Italian divorce referendum, the song was censored in Italy for several months.

== Background ==
=== Conception ===
The music of "Sì" was composed, and the Italian lyrics written, by Mario Panzeri, Daniele Pace, Lorenzo Pilat, and Corrado Conti. It was recorded by Gigliola Cinquetti.

The song is sung in the first person where she reflects and describes her love for a man, and the exhilaration she feels when she finally says "yes" to him, which signifies that they can start the rest of their lives together. Throughout the song, the word "sì" is repeated sixteen times.

=== Eurovision ===
Radiotelevisione italiana (RAI) internally selected "Sì" as its entrant for the 19th edition of the Eurovision Song Contest. In addition to the Italian original version, Cinquetti recorded the song in English –as "Go (Before You Break My Heart)" with lyrics by Norman Newell–, French –as "Lui"–, German –as "Ja" with lyrics by Michael Kunze–, and Spanish –as "Sí"–, which were released and promoted across Europe. RAI filmed a promo video with Cinquetti singing the song alone in a dark room that was distributed to the other participant broadcasters on the Eurovision Song Contest Previews. (Note: It was filmed in black and white as RAI did not move to full colour broadcasts until 1977.)

On 6 April 1974, the Eurovision Song Contest was held at The Dome in Brighton hosted by the British Broadcasting Corporation (BBC), and broadcast live throughout the continent. Cinquetti performed "Sì" seventeenth and final song of the evening, following Portugal's "E depois do adeus" by Paulo de Carvalho. (Note: Which would later be used as a signal in Portugal to begin the Carnation Revolution.) Gianfranco Monaldi conducted the event's live orchestra in the performances of the Italian entry. Cinquetti performed the ballad in a blue dress, accompanied by four teenage female backing singers, dressed in light yellow blouses and autumnal floral skirts.

Under the scoring system of the time, each country had ten jurors, each of whom allocated one point to the song which they deemed to be the best. "Sì" received 18 votes in this manner, including 5 from the United Kingdom, 4 from Monaco, 2 each from Finland and Spain, and single votes from Israel, Luxembourg, Belgium, Ireland. It finished second just behind the Swedish entry "Waterloo" by ABBA. It was Italy's second best result until then, with Cinquetti having won the contest with "Non ho l'età" in the 1964 contest.

=== Censorship ===
RAI delayed the broadcast of the contest in Italy until 6 June 1974 as the event partially coincided with the campaigning for the 1974 Italian divorce referendum which was held on 12 May. RAI censored its own entrant due to concerns the name and lyrics of the song –which constantly repeated the word "SI"– could be accused of being a subliminal message and a form of propaganda to influence the Italian voting public to vote "YES" in the referendum. The song remained censored on most Italian state television and radio stations for over a month after the referendum. As a consequence, the song failed to enter the Top 40 chart in Italy, and still remains one of the lesser known Eurovision entries in the country, despite its good placing. The contest was, however, available to watch in parts of northern Italy where transmissions of Swiss and Yugoslav Italian-language television were accessible.

== Commercial performance ==
As opposed to "Non ho l'età", "Sì" also failed to make a significant impact on the charts in Continental Europe and Scandinavia – with one notable exception: the English version "Go (Before You Break My Heart)" reached eighth position in the British charts in June 1974 –with the original Italian version on the B-side–, making it one of the very few non-winning Eurovision entries to become a commercial success in the United Kingdom.

=== Weekly charts ===
Chart (1974)	Peak position
Belgium (Ultratop 50 Flanders) Italian-language version	30
Germany (Media Control AG) Italian-language version	13
Germany (Media Control AG) German-language version	45
UK Singles (Official Charts Company) English-language version	8

== Legacy ==
A Finnish rendering, "Niin", was recorded by Lea Laven and became a Top Ten hit in Finland.

The song is used in the third episode of the Netflix series Halston.
