= Nice One Cyril =

Single by Cockerel Chorus
- B-side: "Cyril Marches On"
- Released: February 1973
- Genre: Singalong, Football, Novelty song
- Label: Young Blood International
- Songwriters: Harold Spiro, Helen Clarke
- Producer: Martin Clarke

"Nice One Cyril" is a single by Cockerel Chorus written by Harold Spiro and Helen Clarke. The song title is a reference to Cyril Knowles, a left back who played for Tottenham Hotspur. It was released before the 1973 Football League Cup Final where Tottenham played Norwich City. It reached No. 14 on the UK Singles Chart, after Tottenham won, and its writers Spiro and Clarke received an Ivor Novello Award for Best Novel or Unusual Song in 1974.

== Origin ==
In 1972, Wonderloaf Bread created a television advertising campaign written by Peter Mayle with the slogan "Nice one, Cyril", where the slogan was used to congratulate a baker named Cyril for baking a good loaf of bread. The slogan was picked by fans of the football club Tottenham Hotspur, who chanted "Nice one Cyril" to praise a Tottenham player named Cyril Knowles. Harold Spiro, a fan of the club, wrote the song with Helen Clarke based on the slogan. They also used the tune of the folk song "Farewell, Ladies" for the chorus. The song was performed by the Cockerel Chorus (the cockerel is the emblem of Tottenham Hotspur) fronted by Spiro, with Jamie Phillips singing the opening operatic part. The future Iron Maiden drummer Nicko McBrain played on the drum on the song, which was one of his earliest professional recordings.

== Chart performance ==
The song was released in 1973 before Tottenham reached the League Cup Final. It entered the UK Singles Chart at No. 43 on 24 February 1973. It peaked at No. 14 a month later after Tottenham won the League Cup 1–0 against Norwich on 3 March 1973.

== Popular culture ==
Due to the popularity of the TV slogan and the song, "Nice one Cyril" became a popular catchphrase in the 1970s used to praise someone. In Cockney rhyming slang it was adopted to mean "squirrel", and it was the title of the autobiography of Cyril Fletcher. The phrase continued to be used in later decades, but limited to those named Cyril or similar; the refrain of the song "Nice one Cyril, nice one son" was used as a tribute to another footballer Cyrille Regis in 2018.

The "Nice one Cyril" chant used by Tottenham fans for Cyril Knowles was also used for another Tottenham player Son Heung-min, reworded as "Nice one, Sonny, nice one Son / Nice one, Sonny, let’s have another one."
