= Pepe Willberg =

Finnish singer and songwriter

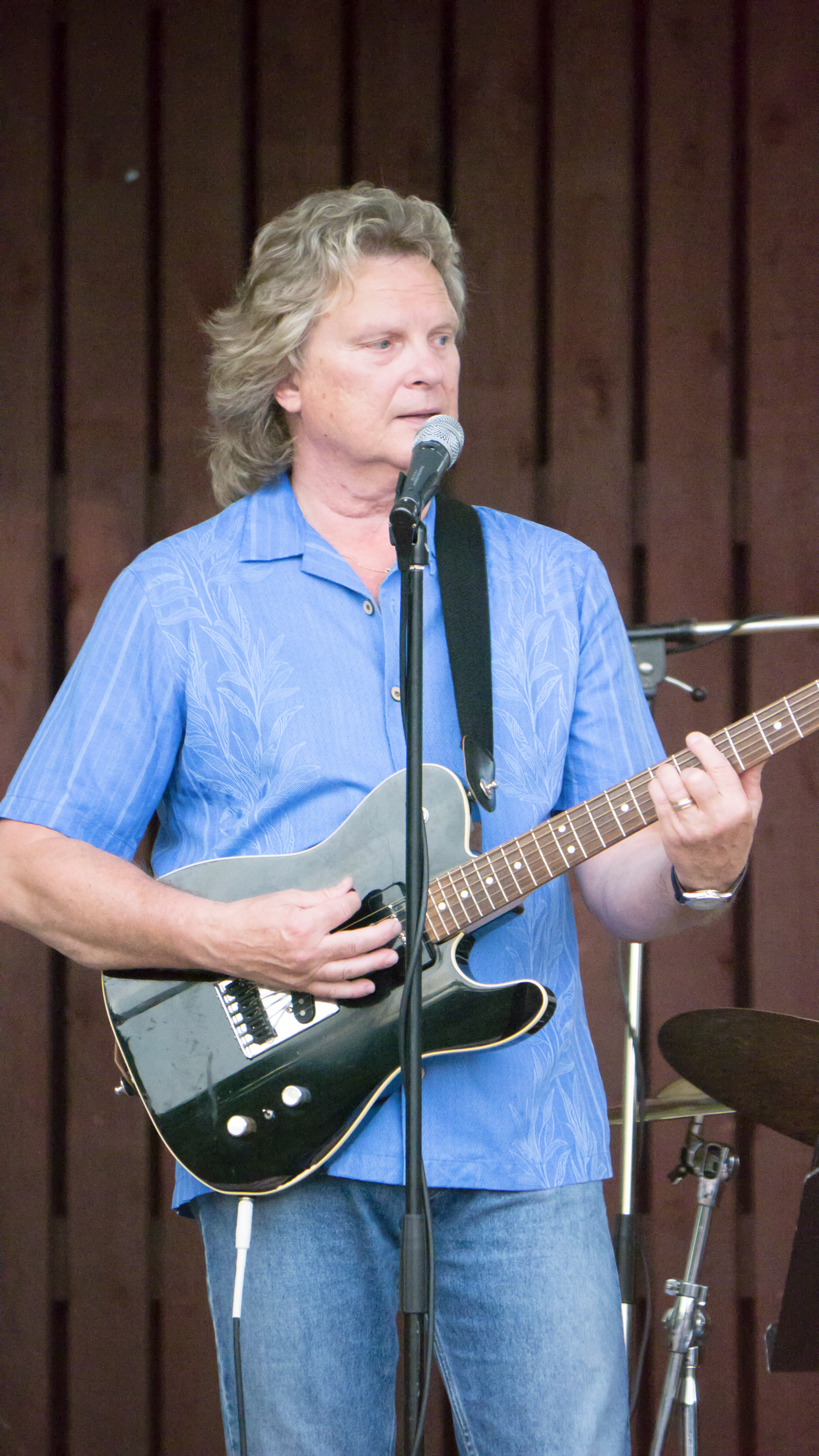
- Pepe Willberg in 2011

Background information
- Born: Toivo Pertti Uolevi Kaukonen; 17 December 1946 (age 78); Turku, Finland
- Origin: Helsinki, Finland
- Genres: schlager
- Occupation(s): Singer, songwriter, guitarist
- Years active: 1962–present
- Website: pepewillberg.com

Pertti "Pepe" Willberg (formerly Toivo Pertti Uolevi Willberg, till 1955 Kaukonen; born 17 December 1946) is a Finnish singer, songwriter and guitarist.

== Biography ==
Willberg was born in Turku and started his musical career in the beginning of the 1960s, playing the rhythm guitar in a Lauttasaari (Helsinki) based band called the Islanders. Since then he has performed, for example as the lead singer for the bands Jormas and Pepe & Paradise. In addition to his solo career Willberg has also appeared with groups such as the Finntastic, Mestarit (Masters), and Poptenorit (Poptenors). His tenth solo album Pepe & Saimaa was nominated for IMPALA's European Independent Album of the Year Award.

== Discography ==
=== Solo albums ===
- Sinulle (1976)
- Päivä tuskin päättyis kauniimmin (1979)
- 20 vuotta (1984)
- Kun joulu on (albumi) (1986)
- Yksi ruusu (1986)
- Tulit valona maailmaan (1990)
- Syliisi aamuun jään (1999)
- Kynttilöiden syttyessä (2005)
- Kaukaa kaipaan (2007)
- Pepe & Saimaa (2014)

=== Co-operative albums ===
- Jormas: Jormas (album) (1966)
- M. A. Numminen ystävineen: M. A. Numminen In memoriam (1967) (vocal in "Viiskulmassa on viisi kulmaa")
- Jormas: Sincerely! (1968)
- Pepe & Paradise: Niin vähän on aikaa (1972)
- Pepe & Paradise: Pepe & Paradise (album) (1973)
- Pepe & Paradise: Pepe & Paradise 2 (1975)
- Hukkaputki: Hukkaa päälle! (1983)
- Mestarit: Mestarit Areenalla (1999)
- Tommy Tabermann & Olli Ahvenlahti: Kaksi ihoa (2007)

=== Collections ===
- Pepe Willberg & Jormas: Pepen parhaat - The Best of Pepe (1972)
- Parhaat päältä - The top of the tops (1978)
- Parhaat (Pepe Willberg/Overdisc) - The Best (1987)
- Parhaat (Pepe Willberg/Fazer Finnlevy) - The Best (1989)
- Toivotut - The Most Wanted (1992)
- 20 suosikkia – Rööperiin - 20 Favourites – To Rodberg (1996)
- Jormas: 20 suosikkia – Saat miehen kyyneliin - 20 Favourites – You Make a Man Cry (1996)
- 20 suosikkia – Lady Madonna- 20 Favourites – Lady Madonna (1998)
- 14 suomalaista kestosuosikkia - 14 All Time Favourites of Finland (1998)
- 14 rakastettua kansanlaulua - 14 Loved Folk Songs (1998)
- Elämältä kaiken sain - I Got Everything from My Life (1999)
- Pepe & Paradise: 70's Radio Hits (2000)
- Jormas: Saat miehen Rööperiin - You'll Get a Man to Rodberg (2001)
- Lauluja rakkaudesta (Pepe Willberg) - Songs of Love (2006)
- Luokses palaan taas (2CD) - I'll Come Back to You (2006)

== Charts ==
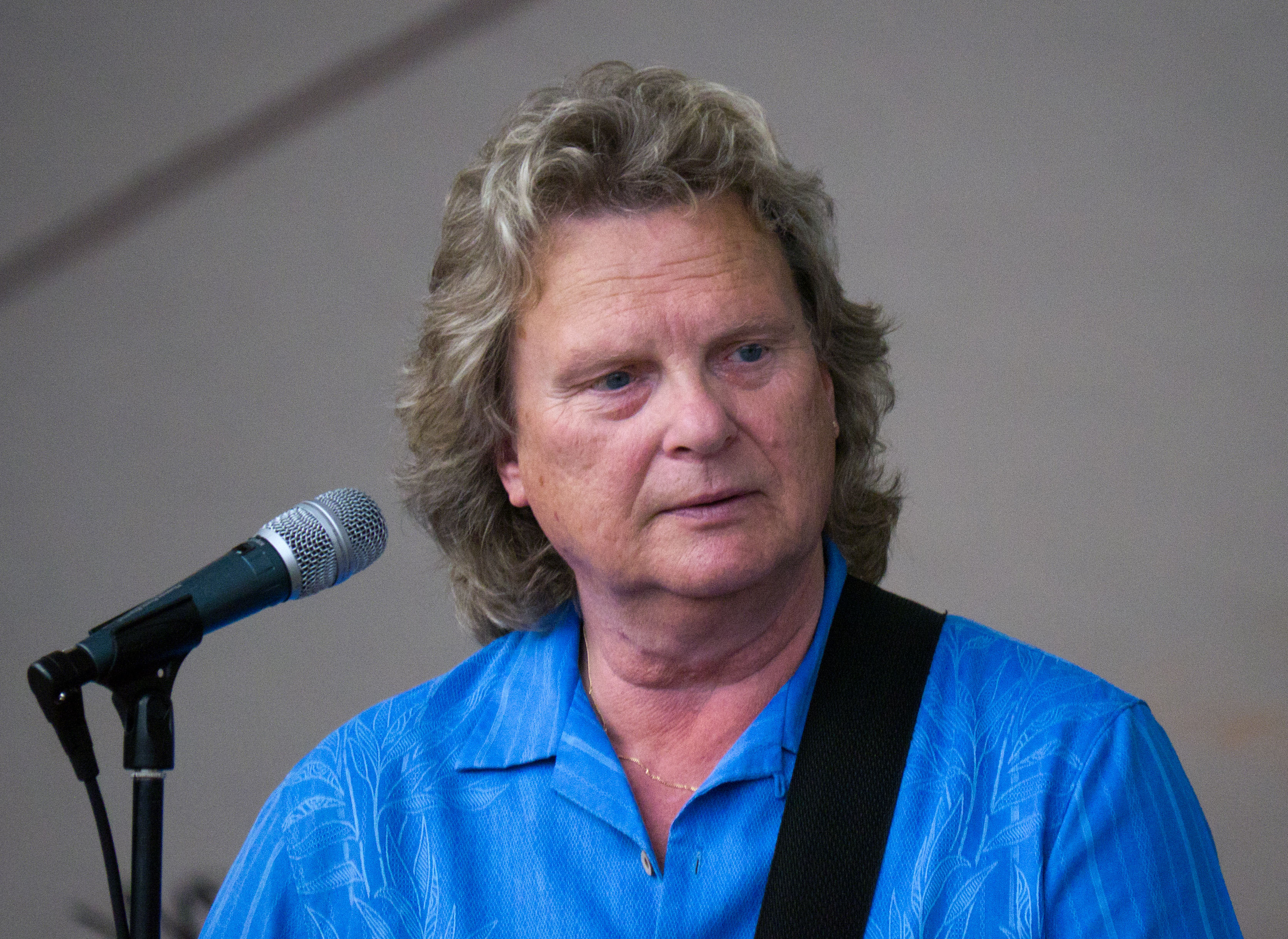
Pepe Willberg

(Albums appearing in Suomen virallinen lista)

Year	Album	Peak positions
Year	Album	FIN
1999	Mestarit Areenalla (Kirka, Hector, Pave Maijanen & Pepe Willberg)	1
1999	Syliisi aamuun jään	34
1999	Elämältä kaiken sain - 18 suosituinta	22
2014	Pepe & Saimaa	1

== See also ==
- Official website
- Unofficial webpage for Pepe Willberg
- Pepe Willberg in Pomus.net
- Jormas & Pepe Willberg. YLE Elävä arkisto. (The tape archives of the Finnish Broadcasting Company.)
