= Ireland in the Eurovision Song Contest 1974 =

- Eurovision Song Contest 1974
- Participating broadcaster: Radio Telefís Éireann (RTÉ)
- Country: Ireland
- Selection process: Artist: Internal selection Song: National Song Contest
- Selection date: 10 February 1974

Competing entry
- Song: "Cross Your Heart"
- Artist: Tina
- Songwriter: Paul Lyttle

Placement
- Final result: 7th, 11 points

Participation chronology

Ireland was represented at the Eurovision Song Contest 1974 with the song "Cross Your Heart", written by Paul Lyttle, and performed by showband singer Tina. The Irish participating broadcaster, Radio Telefís Éireann (RTÉ), selected its entry through a national final, after having previously selected the performer internally.

For the first time since joining Eurovision in 1965, RTÉ pre-selected Tina as its performer rather than holding a multi-artist selection. It is generally believed that this was in acknowledgement of Tina's co-operation with RTÉ during the well-publicised controversies and disagreements which had dogged the Irish participation in 1973.

== Before Eurovision ==
=== National Song Contest ===
Radio Telefís Éireann (RTÉ) held the tenth edition of the National Song Contest at its studios in Dublin on the entertainment show The Likes Of Mike, hosted by Mike Murphy. Tina performed the eight songs on Saturday 2 February 1974, with the winner chosen by postcard voting, the results of which were announced on Sunday 10 February.

Final – 10 February 1974
| R/O | Song | Votes | Place |
|---|---|---|---|
| 1 | "Tiocfaidh mé ar ais" | 3,738 | 4 |
| 2 | "Music Man" | 2,317 | 5 |
| 3 | "Cinnte" | 930 | 7 |
| 4 | "Never Again" | 1,012 | 6 |
| 5 | "Is liom é" | 5,044 | 2 |
| 6 | "Cross Your Heart" | 16,686 | 1 |
| 7 | "Nach aisteach mar éalaíonn an grá" | 564 | 8 |
| 8 | "My World" | 4,729 | 3 |

Irish Army soldiers were stationed outside the studio after a bomb threat was called in to RTÉ seven minutes before the show, which took place during the most violent period of The Troubles. Four more bomb threats were called in during the programme.

== At Eurovision ==
On the night of the final Reynolds performed 13th in the running order, following the Netherlands and preceding Germany. At the close of voting "Cross Your Heart" had picked up 11 points, placing Ireland joint 7th (with Israel) of the 17 entries.

=== Voting ===
Points awarded to Ireland
| Score | Country |
|---|---|
| 2 points | Luxembourg; Norway; Spain; Sweden |
| 1 point | Israel; Monaco; United Kingdom |

Points awarded by Ireland
| Score | Country |
|---|---|
| 3 points | Luxembourg |
| 1 point | Finland; Israel; Italy; Monaco; Netherlands; Sweden; United Kingdom |
