= Belgium in the Eurovision Song Contest 1974 =

- Eurovision Song Contest 1974
- Participating broadcaster: Radiodiffusion-télévision belge (RTB)
- Country: Belgium
- Selection process: Artist: Internal selection Song: National final
- Selection date: 14 January 1974

Competing entry
- Song: "Fleur de liberté"
- Artist: Jacques Hustin
- Songwriters: Jacques Hustin; Franck F. Gérald

Placement
- Final result: 9th, 10 points

Participation chronology

Belgium was represented at the Eurovision Song Contest 1974 with the song "Fleur de liberté", composed by Jacques Hustin, with lyrics by Franck F. Gérald, and performed by Hustin himself. The Belgian participating broadcaster, Walloon Radiodiffusion-télévision belge (RTB), selected its entry through a national final, after having previously selected the performer internally.

== Before Eurovision ==
=== Jacques Hustin ===
Jacques Hustin was the name of the national final developed by Walloon broadcaster Radiodiffusion-télévision belge (RTB) to select the Belgian entry for the Eurovision Song Contest 1974. Six songs, all performed by Jacques Hustin, competed in the final which was hosted by Paule Herreman, and the winner was chosen by postcard voting.

Final – 14 January 1974
R/O	Song	Songwriter(s)		Place
R/O	Song	Composer(s)	Lyricist(s)	Place
1	"Chanson pour un grain de riz"	Jacques Hustin	Bourdet	5
2	"Sur les chemins du monde"	Jacques Hustin		4
3	"Étranger, baladin, voyageur"	Jacques Hustin	Michelle Senlis	3
4	"Fleur de liberté"	Jacques Hustin	Frank Gérald	1
5	"Le foulard gris"	Jacques Hustin; Roland Thyssen	Michelle Senlis	6
6	"On dit de toi, on dit de moi"	Jacques Hustin; Frank Gérald; Boris Bergman		2

== At Eurovision ==
On the night of the final Hustin performed 11th in the running order, following Monaco and preceding the Netherlands. The voting system tried between 1971 and 1973 was abandoned, and for 1974 returned to the previous system of ten jury members in each country awarding one vote each. At the close of the voting "Fleur de liberté" had received 10 points, placing Belgium 9th of the 17 competing entries.

=== Voting ===
Points awarded to Belgium
Score	Country
5 points	Greece
3 points	Luxembourg
2 points	Norway

Points awarded by Belgium
Score	Country
2 points	Monaco
1 point	Germany; Italy; Luxembourg; Netherlands; Norway; Switzerland; United Kingdom; Yugoslavia
