= Michelle Senlis =

French lyricist (1933–2020)

- Born: Michelle Jacqueline Jeanne Fricault; 20 July 1933; Montgeron, France
- Died: 21 July 2020 (aged 87); Paris, France
- Occupation: Lyricist

Michelle Senlis (20 July 1933 – 21 July 2020) was a French lyricist and songwriter. She notably wrote songs for Jean Ferrat, Juliette Gréco, Fabienne Thibeault, and Hugues Aufray.

== Biography ==
Édith Piaf was the first singer to perform a song written by Senlis. She wrote Les Amants d'un jour in 1956 and Comme moi 1958 for Marguertie Monnot. She co-wrote numerous songs with her partner, Claude Delécluse, including La Belle Amour for Léo Ferré in 1959.

In 1963, among others, Senlis wrote C'est un jour à Naples for Dalida, Rachel for Juliette Gréco, and Quatre cents Enfants noirs Christine Sèvres. In 1967, with Fracis Lai, she wrote a song, titled Venise sous la neige and sung by Jacqueline Dulac. However, it was with Jean Ferrat that her career was most fruitful. She wrote thirty songs for Ferrant. Other performers she wrote for included Noëlle Cordier, Georgette Lemaire, Mireille Mathieu, Régine Zylberberg, and Jacques Hustin.

For the last twenty years of her life, Senlis left the songwriting industry and took up painting. However, she made a return one last time in 2016, writing the song Elle a refermé le piano for Isabelle Aubret. In 2016, she published a collection of poems, titled Du cœur à l'aubier and dedicated to her longtime companion, Claude Delécluse.

Michelle Senlis died in Paris on 21 July 2020 at the age of 87.
