= Tina Reynolds =

- Also known as: Tina
- Born: Philomena Quinn; 1949/50; Greystones, County Wicklow, Ireland
- Origin: Greystones
- Genres: showband, pop
- Occupation: Singer
- Years active: 1966–1978
- Labels: Ruby Records, Pye Records, Play Records, Polydor, Release Records, Target Records

Philomena "Phil" Tully (née Quinn; born 1949/50), known by the stage name Tina Reynolds or simply Tina, is an Irish singer.

== Early life ==
Born Philomena Quinn, she has tuberculosis from a young age and grew up in hospitals.

== Career ==
Tina's career began after winning a talent contest at Butlins Skegness. She sang with the Mexicans showband from 1966 to 1968.

Having taken part in the 1972 National Song Contest to choose Ireland's Eurovision song singing Don't Need Your Sympathy, she represented Ireland in the Eurovision Song Contest 1974. Her song Cross Your Heart came seventh but was a number 1 hit in the Irish charts. Prior to this Tina had hits in Ireland with I Don't Know How to Love Him, number 1, 1971; Tell Me What's the Matter, number 15, 1972 and When Morning Has Come, number 20, 1973. Tina almost represented Ireland at the Eurovision in 1973 as she was flown out to Luxembourg to replace singer Maxi when a dispute about the live arrangement of the song had arisen in rehearsals. Ultimately, Maxi agreed to perform the preferred arrangement by RTE musical director Colman Pearce and Tina was offered the 1974 contest.

After her Eurovision appearance Tina remained a popular live and TV performer in Ireland and had further hits with All Through the Night (a duet with Glen Curtin), number 20 in 1975 and I'll Do It All Again which reached number 3 in 1976.

Tina's German-language version of her Eurovision entry Hand auf's Herz is available on the various artists CD 1000 Nadelstiche Vol 8 issued on Bear Family records.

== Personal life ==
Tina married Mexicans bandmate Desi Reynolds but they later divorced; she married Eamon Tully in 1990 and the couple live in Edenderry, Ireland.

Awards and achievements
Preceded by Maxi with "Do I Dream"	Ireland in the Eurovision Song Contest; 1974	Succeeded by The Swarbriggs with "That's What Friends Are For"
