= Harold Spiro =

- Also known as: Hoagy Pogey
- Born: Harold Jacob Spiro; 25 June 1925; London, England
- Died: 11 December 1996 (aged 71) Cyprus
- Genres: Pop music
- Occupation: Songwriter
- Years active: 1960s–1996

Harold Jacob Spiro (25 June 1925 – 11 December 1996) was an English songwriter. He is best known for his co-writing with Valerie Avon, particularly the song "Long Live Love" (1974) performed by Olivia Newton-John, which was the UK's entry in the Eurovision Song Contest 1974.

He won an Ivor Novello Award for Best Novel or Unusual Song for co-writing "Nice One Cyril".

== Early days ==
His interest in music began at an early age, in London's East End, where his uncle regularly took him to the Music hall.

It was here that he first met Tony Hiller, (who helped create Brotherhood of Man) and so began a lifelong friendship. Years later Hiller gave Spiro his first publishing deal, and later still was to be involved in producing him in his singing career as 'Hoagy Pogey'.

In 1944, aged 18, Spiro volunteered for the Royal Navy and did his training in Chatham, Kent, where he qualified as a nurse, and was sent to Iceland to work on an American naval base.

After the World War II ended, he knew that he wanted a career in the music industry, rather than taking over the family shop. He enrolled at Carnegie Hall, where he studied musical theory and conducting. However, popular music became his main interest. Continuing to work in the shop, he wrote songs in his spare time, inspired by the works of George Gershwin and Hoagy Carmichael.

In 1954 his father died, and he met his future wife, Barbara, and they married the following year. In 1956, their first child, Judith, was born. Their daughter Lorraine, was born in 1959, and Spiro started a wholesale greeting cards business, where he wrote the verses for the cards he sold. In 1961, their son, Russell, was born.

== Musical years ==
Spiro decided to enter the music business full-time after a discussion with Eddie Cantor. He got his first publishing deal, and also supported his wife's cousin, Phil Wainman, who was later to become the producer for The Bay City Rollers and The Boomtown Rats. Together, they wrote for Mike and Bernie Winters and they also initially worked together with a band, later to become The Sweet, who first rehearsed in the Spiro's living room.

Spiro was the co-writer (with Wainman) behind The Yardbirds' hit, "Little Games" (1967), successful on both sides of the Atlantic. It was one of the first songs of that era to use a sitar in the recording mix.

In the 1970s, Spiro met Valerie Avon, his most significant songwriting partner, when he was working at Belwin Mills Publishing. During that time, they wrote many songs together, including tracks recorded by Roger Cook and Roger Greenaway, as The Pipkins, Georgie Fame, Tina Charles, Peter Noone, "Desdemona" by The Searchers, "Easy Loving", a hit for The Troggs and the track, "Don't Move Away", for both Cliff Richard and Olivia Newton-John.

They were involved in the Eurovision Song Contest for two consecutive years with, "Can I Believe", for Mary Hopkin and "In My World of Beautiful Things", for Clodagh Rodgers. This culminated in representing the UK with "Long Live Love", performed by Olivia Newton-John in 1974, which went on to be recorded worldwide by more than 50 artists.

Valerie Avon was also instrumental in helping to create a performing image for Spiro. From 1973, as 'Hoagy Pogey', he worked with Jamie Philips and Dougie Squires and the Second Generation, touring Europe, making stage and television appearances. He also had an interview on the Russell Harty show.

== Football ==
Spiro loved football and was a season ticket holder at Tottenham Hotspur F.C. This led him to compose "Nice One Cyril", winning him an Ivor Novello Award. The song, performed by Cockerel Chorus, was inspired by Cyril Knowles who was widely regarded as the greatest left-back in the club's history. The song peaked at number 14 in the UK Singles Chart in March 1973.

Spiro, with Jamie Philips singing the operatic introduction, fronted the group, which then went on to record an album. Throughout his life, Spiro wrote many other football songs, recorded by major teams, including "Here We Go" for Everton; and "Nice One Gazza", as well as "Tribute to Ardiles and Villa" again for Spurs.

Spiro also formed a partnership with Alan A. Freeman, well known as a record producer and for establishing Pye Records. Together, they created Spiral Records and later on, a music publishing company, Trekfarm. Jointly they discovered Red Box, who went on to have success with "Lean on Me (Ah-li-ayo)", a song which reached number three in the UK Singles Chart.

== Kenny Ball and his Jazzmen ==
The partnership also recorded Kenny Ball and his Jazzmen, with Spiro writing the theme music for Ball's television show, Saturday Night at the Mill. Spiro and Freeman also recorded Barbara Woodhouse, famous for her dog-training skills, "Diddy" David Hamilton and Les Dawson.

== Latter years ==
After his success in the 1970s and early 1980s, Spiro became a financial consultant with the insurance company, Sun Alliance. He later moved home to Westgate-on-Sea, and bought a holiday home in Cyprus. He worked with Cypriot writers and musicians, and appeared on Cyprus television. One of the last songs he ever wrote was dedicated to peace and unity there, entitled, "Only One Sky".

When back in England, Spiro continued with his projects, involving local musicians and writers, including the novelist, Peter Corey. He later worked on a musical for children.

More recently, thanks to his son Russell, now director of Trekfarm, Spiro's song "We're on the Ball" became the official World Cup song for 2002, and with Ant and Dec became a success.

Harold Spiro died on 11 December 1996 in Cyprus, where he was buried.

== See also ==
- United Kingdom in the Eurovision Song Contest
