= Norway in the Eurovision Song Contest 1974 =

- Eurovision Song Contest 1974
- Participating broadcaster: Norsk rikskringkasting (NRK)
- Country: Norway
- Selection process: Melodi Grand Prix 1974
- Selection date: 16 February 1974

Competing entry
- Song: "The First Day of Love"
- Artist: Anne-Karine Strøm
- Songwriters: Frode Thingnæs; Philip A. Kruse

Placement
- Final result: 14th, 3 points

Participation chronology

Norway was represented at the Eurovision Song Contest 1974 with the song "The First Day of Love", composed by Frode Thingnæs, with lyrics by Philip A. Kruse, and performed by Anne-Karine Strøm. The Norwegian participating broadcaster, Norsk rikskringkasting (NRK), organised the national final Melodi Grand Prix 1974 in order to select its entry for the contest. Strøm had already represented Norway at the 1973 contest as a member of the Bendik Singers, whose other three members provided backing vocals in the 1974 contest.

== Before Eurovision ==
=== Melodi Grand Prix 1974 ===
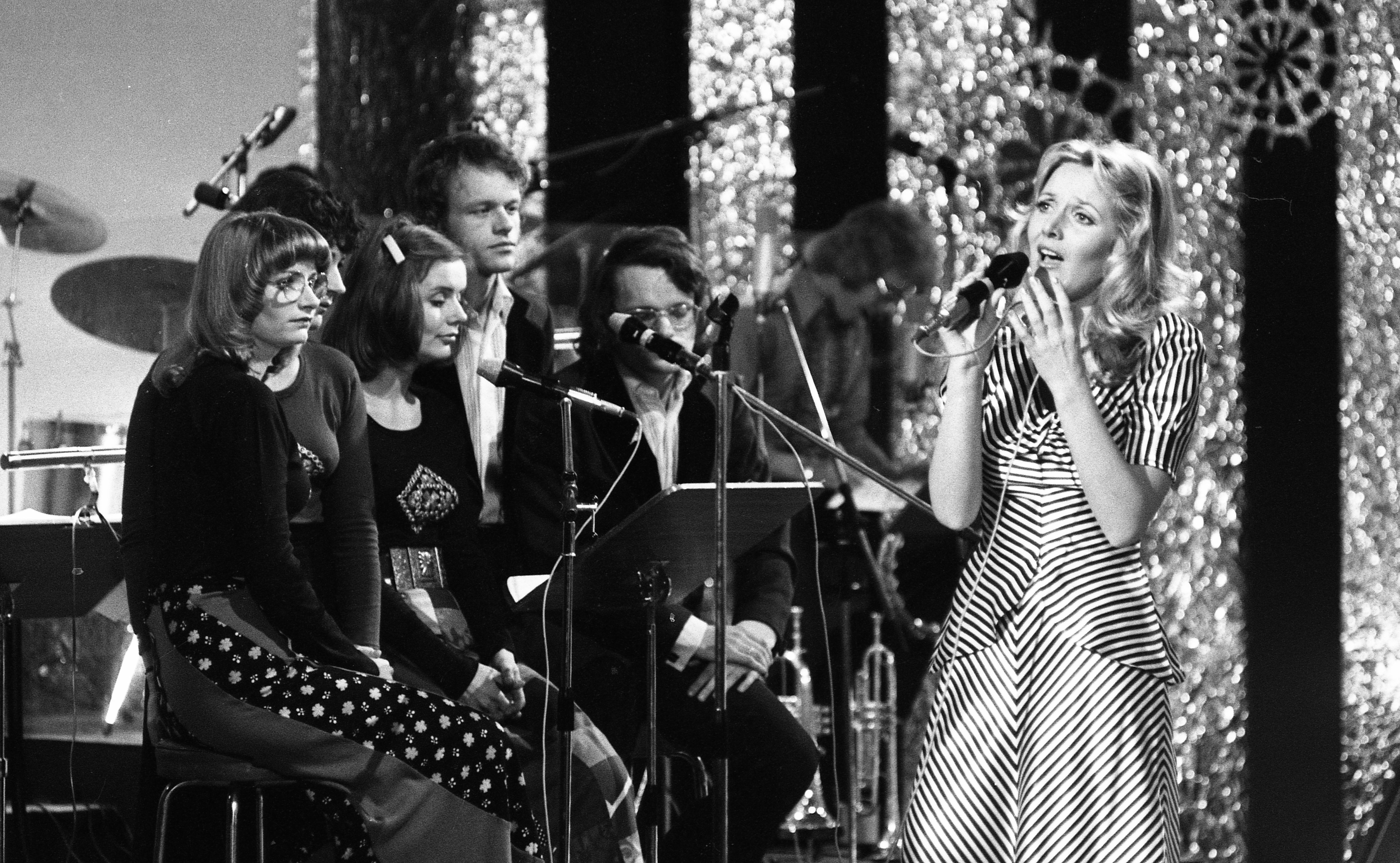
Strøm performing "Hvor er du" at the Melodi Grand Prix final.

Norsk rikskringkasting (NRK) held the Melodi Grand Prix 1974 at its studios in Oslo, hosted by Vidar Lønn-Arnesen. Five songs were presented in the final with each song sung twice by different singers, once with a small combo and once with a full orchestra. The winning song was chosen by voting from a 14-member public jury who each awarded between 1 and 5 points per song. "The First Day of Love" was performed in Norwegian as "Hvor er du" at the national final and was translated into English before going to Eurovision.

MGP - 16 February 1974
R/O	Combo	Orchestra	Song	Points	Place
1	Jahn Teigen	Anne-Karine Strøm	"Hvor er du"	48	1
2	Dag Spantell	Ellen Nikolaysen	"Lys og mørke"	44	3
3	Anne Lise Gjøstøl	Dizzie Tunes	"Syng en liten melodi"	46	2
4	Lillian Harriet	Gro Anita Schønn	"Hvem"	29	5
5	Kjersti and Kirsti	Stein and Inger Lyse	"Yo-Yo"	34	4

== At Eurovision ==
On the evening of the final Strøm performed 4th in the running order, following Spain and preceding Greece. The voting for 1974 reverted to the one-point-per-jury-member system and at the close of voting "The First Day of Love" had picked up only 3 points, placing Norway joint last (with Germany, Portugal, and Switzerland) of the 17 entries, the third time the country ended the evening at the foot of the scoreboard.

=== Voting ===
Points awarded to Norway
Score	Country
1 point	Belgium; Monaco; Sweden

Points awarded by Norway
Score	Country
2 points	Belgium; Ireland; Spain; Sweden
1 point	Monaco; Netherlands
