= José Calvário =

Portuguese songwriter and composer (1951–2009)

José Carlos Barbosa Calvário (1951, Porto – 17 June 2009, Oeiras) was a Portuguese songwriter and conductor.

He was also a composer, and conducted at many Portuguese festivals.

In the Eurovision Song Contest he was the composer, lyricist and conductor of five Portuguese entries, "A festa da vida" (1972), "E depois do adeus" (1974), "Portugal no coração" (1977), "Penso em ti, eu sei" (1985) and "Voltarei" (1988).

== Death ==
He died on 17 June 2009, aged 58, following a heart attack.
