= Peret =

Catalan Romani singer, guitar player and composer (1935–2014)

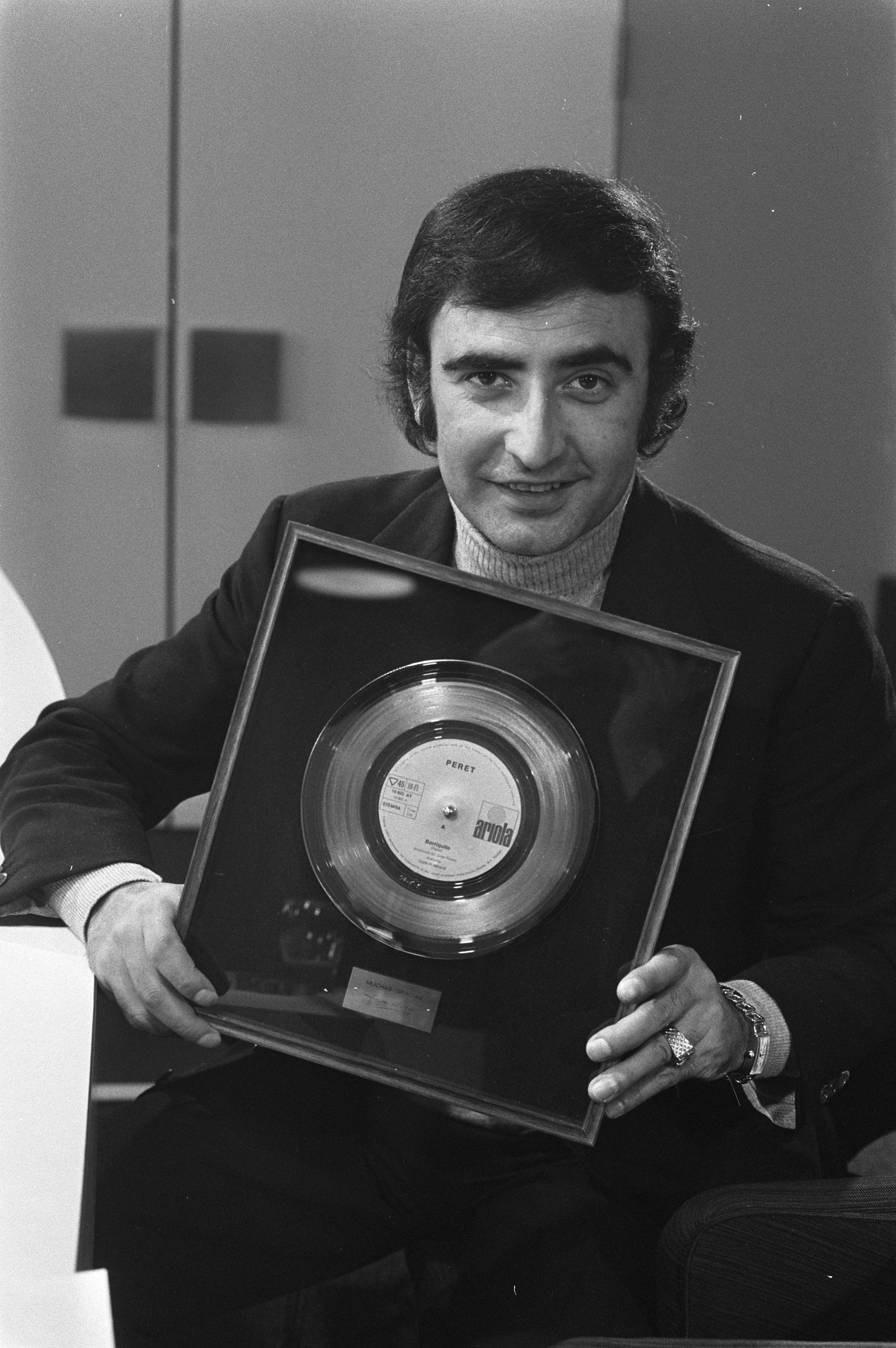
- Peret in 1971

Background information
- Born: Pedro Pubill Calaf; 24 March 1935; Mataró (Barcelona), Spain
- Died: 27 August 2014 (aged 79) Barcelona, Spain
- Genre: Catalan rumba
- Occupations: Singer-songwriter; composer; musician; actor
- Instruments: Vocals; guitar
- Years active: 1957–2014

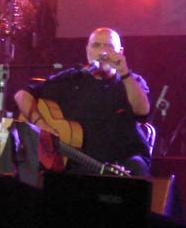
Peret performing in 2007

Pedro Pubill Calaf (Spanish: [ˈpeðɾo puˈβil kaˈlaf], Catalan: [puˈβiʎ kəˈlaf]; 24 March 1935 – 27 August 2014), better known as Peret, was a Catalan Romani singer, guitar player and composer of Catalan rumba from Mataró (Barcelona).

== Career ==
Known for his 1971 single, "Borriquito" (Ariola Records), Peret represented Spain at the Eurovision Song Contest 1974 with the song "Canta y sé feliz" and performed during the closing ceremony at the 1992 Summer Olympics in Barcelona. In 2001, Peret recorded and released Rey De La Rumba (King of the Rumba) an album of updated versions of his older songs with guest musicians including Jarabe de Palo, El Gran Silencio, David Byrne of Talking Heads, and more.

In 1982, Peret withdrew from the music industry, joining the Iglesia Evangélica de Filadelfia, a large religious community of the Spanish Roma (gypsies) devoting himself in the following years exclusively to preaching and religious activities. After leaving the church in 1991, he resumed his music activity and recorded new albums. In 1992, he was honored for all his body of work when he sang as representative of Catalonia at the Olympic Games in Barcelona during the closing ceremonies.

== Death ==
Peret died in Barcelona in 2014 from lung cancer, aged 79.

== Discography ==
=== Vinyl albums ===
- 1967: Peret (Discophon)
- 1968: Rumba pa'ti (Discophon)
- 1968: Una lágrima (Vergara)
- 1969: Lamento gitano (Discophon)
- 1969: Gipsy Rhumbas (Discophon)
- 1970: Canta para el cine (Vergara)
- 1971: Borriquito (Ariola)
- 1972: Una lágrima (Ariola)
- 1973: Mi santa (Ariola)
- 1974: Lo mejor de Peret (Ariola)
- 1974: Peret y sus gitanos (EMI)
- 1974: Canta y sé feliz (Ariola)
- 1978: Saboreando (Ariola)
- 1978: Lágrimas negras (Ariola)
- 1978: El joven Peret (CBS)
- 1980: El jilguero (Belter)
- 1981: De cap a la palla (Belter)
- 1988: De coco a la paja (Belter)

=== CD albums ===
- 1991: No se pué aguantar (PDI)*
- 1992: Gitana hechicera (PDI)*
- 1992: Rumbas de la clausura a co-album with Los Manolos and Los Amaya (PDI)*
- 1993: Cómo me gusta (PDI)*
- 1995: Que disparen flores (PDI)*
- 1996: Jesús de Nazareth (PDI)*
- 2000: Rey de la Rumba (Virgin)
- 2007: Que levante el dedo (K Industria Cultural)
- 2009: De los cobardes nunca se ha escrito nada (Universal Music)

*Re-released in 2008 by Picap

=== Posthumous albums ===
- 2014: Des del Respecte / Desde el Respeto (Satélite K)

=== Compilation albums ===
- 1979: El cancionero nº 1 (Belter)
- 1982: El forat (Impacto) (Cassette release - Side A in Catalan, side B tracks from De cap a la palla and De coco a la paja)
- 1989: Rumbas de oro (Divucsa)
- 1990: Peret es la rumba (Ariola)
- 1994: La vida por delante (Sony/BMG)
- 1996: Siempre Peret (PDI)
- 1998: Sus grabaciones en Discophon (Rama Lama/Blanco y Negro)
- 2000: Don Toribio Carambola (Arcade)
- 2000: Chica Vaivén (Sony/BMG)
- 2000: Número 1 en rumba (PDI)
- 2001: La salsa de la rumba (Sony/BMG)
- 2004: Singles Collection (Divucsa)
- 2006: Mano a mano (Divucsa)
- 2008: Sus 20 grandes éxitos (O.K.)

=== Singles ===
(Selective international hits)

- 1971: "Borriquito"
- 1971: "Voy voy"
- 1972: "Ni fu ni fa"
- 1973: "El mosquito"
- 1974: "Canta y sé feliz"
- 1988: "Borriquito" (Mix)

other hits:

- 1964: "Sapore di sale" / "Salomé" / "Qué suerte" / "Si yo fuera" (Discophon), 1964)
- 1965: "Jugando" / "Caliente" (Ariola, 1975)
- 1978: "Saboreando"
- 1980: "Pa amb oli" / "De cap a la palla" (Belter)
- 1982: "El forat" / "Estem fotuts"
- 2001: "Marujas asesinas" (Virgin)

== Charts ==
Year	Single	Peak positions			Certification	Album
Year	Single	NED Dutch Top 40	NED Single Top 100	GER	Certification	Album
1971	"Borriquito"	1	1	1		Borriquito
1971	"Voy voy"	22	16	-		
1974	"Canta y sé feliz"		Tip			Canta y sé feliz

== Filmography ==
- 1969: Amor a todo gas
- 1970: El meson del gitano
- 1971: A mi las mujeres ni fu ni fa
- 1973: Que cosas tiene el amor
- 1974: Si fulano fuese mengano

Various supporting roles and extras

- 1963: Los Tarantos
- 1967: Las cuatro bodas de Marisol
- 1968: El taxi de los conflictos
- 1968: Un dia despues de agosto
- 1969: Alma gitana
- 2001: Marujas asesinas
- 2008: Lazos rotos

== Related bibliography ==
- Peret, l'ànima d'un poble., by Cèlia Sànchez-Mústich. Edicions 62 (2005)
- Peret: Biografía de la Rumba Catalana., by Juan Puchades. Global Rhythm Press (2011).

Preceded by Mocedades with "Eres tú"	Spain in the Eurovision Song Contest; 1974	Succeeded by Sergio y Estíbaliz with "Tú volverás"
