= Gerrit den Braber =

Dutch songwriter and lyricist

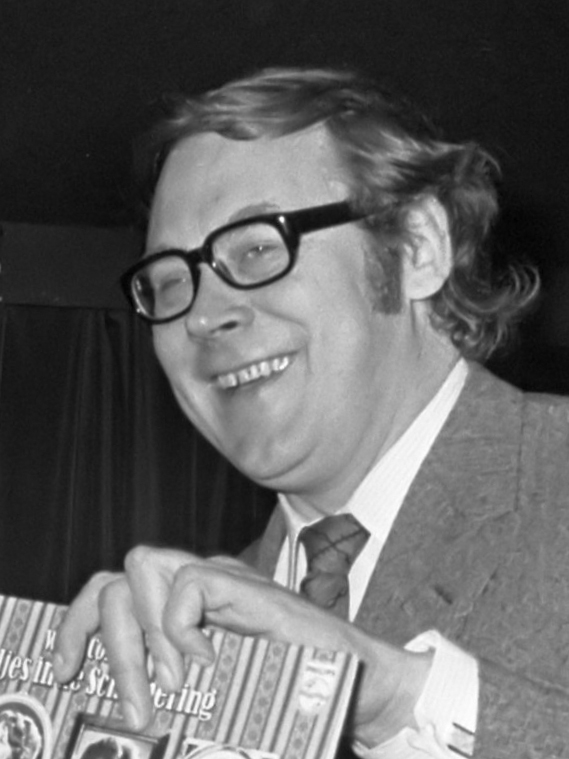
Gerrit den Braber (1972)

Gerrit den Braber (23 March 1929 – 3 May 1997) was born in Rotterdam and was a Dutch songwriter and lyricist.

== Career ==
Braber took music lessons in Rotterdam and Hilversum. He then went into Hospital Radio and joined the Dutch radio and television company VARA in 1955. He wrote the lyrics for three Eurovision Song Contest songs Fernando en Filippo, Ring-dinge-ding and I See a Star, he has also worked with former contestants Willeke Alberti, Corry Brokken, Anneke Grönloh, Lenny Kuhr and Conny Vandenbos as well as providing Dutch commentary for the 1985 Eurovision Song Contest.

== Personal Life and Death ==
He was married to the mother of his children but they divorced and he went to live with Dutch artist Thérèse Steinmetz. He had three children and five grandchildren with his ex-wife. He died from a stroke in 1997.

== Discography ==
Songs written or performed by Braber

- "Mirror"
- "Morgen ben ik de bruid" (Willeke Alberti)
- "De glimlach van een kind" (Willy Alberti)
- "La Mamma" (Corry Brokken)
- "Mijn gebed" (DC Lewis)
- "Sophietje" (zij dronk ranja met een rietje) (Johnny Lion)
- "Paradiso" (Anneke Grönloh)
- "De Generaal" (Lenny Kuhr)
- "Aan de andere kant van de heuvels" (Liesbeth List)
- "Laat me alleen" (Rita Hovink)
- "Ritme van de regen" (Rob de Nijs)
- "Een roosje, m'n roosje"
- "Sjakie van de hoek" (Conny Vandenbos)
