= Carita Holmström =

Finnish pianist, singer and songwriter (born 1954)

Carita Elisabeth Holmström (born 10 February 1954) is a Finnish pianist, singer and songwriter, born in Helsinki. She has written and played jazz and classical music during her career. She also formed half of a duo, Carita & Marianne, with Marianne "Maru" Nyman. She represented Finland in the Eurovision Song Contest 1974 with the song "Keep Me Warm", finishing 13th.

== Discography ==
- We Are What We Do (1973)
- Toinen levy (1974)
- Two Faces (1980)
- Aquamarin (1984)
- Time of Growing (1990)
- DUO! (1994)
- Jos tänään tuntis' huomisen 1973–1974 (If Today Would Know Morrow) (2004)
- My Diary of Songs (2010)

Preceded by Marion Rung with Tom Tom Tom	Finland in the Eurovision Song Contest; 1974	Succeeded by Pihasoittajat with Old Man Fiddle
