= Jacques Hustin =

- Jacques Hustin in 1974

Background information
- Born: 15 March 1940
- Origin: Liège, Belgium
- Died: 6 April 2009 (aged 69)
- Genre: Pop
- Occupation: Singer-songwriter
- Website: users.skynet.be/jacques.hustin/ (in French)

Jacques Hustin (15 March 1940 – 6 April 2009) was a Belgian singer-songwriter and artist who was successful in his homeland in both fields, and is best known internationally for his participation in the 1974 Eurovision Song Contest.

== Early career ==
Hustin was born in Liège. From an early age, Hustin was interested in both music and painting. He studied art and design, and worked at various times as an illustrator, stage designer and composer of incidental music. He released his first album in 1966 and moved to Paris, where he lived for several years. In 1968, he was winner of the first edition of the musical contest "Cerbul de aur" ("Golden Dear"), in the city of Brasov, Romania. His song was "Camelias". He imposed himself on the scene where well-known singers were also performing during the festival: Los Machucambos, Hugues Aufray, Caterina Caselli, Edita Piekha, Amália Rodrigues, Rika Zarai, Rita Pavone, Maria Mitiieva, Bobby Solo, Jean-Claude Pascal. Second place was Czech singer Josef Laufer. Third place was another Belgian singer, Kalinka.

== Eurovision Song Contest ==
In 1974 Hustin's self-penned song "Fleur de liberté" ("Flower of Liberty") was chosen as Belgium's representative in the nineteenth Eurovision Song Contest, which took place on 6 April in Brighton, England. The 1974 contest is notable for the participation of a number of artists who were already internationally known names (Olivia Newton-John, Gigliola Cinquetti, Mouth & MacNeal), also as the contest which served to launch the winning group, ABBA, into global superstardom. In this very competitive field, "Fleur de liberté" finished in ninth place of 17 entries.

In 1978, Hustin took part in the Belgian Eurovision selection for a second time, but on that occasion his song "L'an 2000 c'est demain" ("The Year 2000 is Tomorrow") lost out to "L'amour ça fait chanter la vie" by Jean Vallée (which went on to finish second in the 1978 contest, Belgium's highest placing to that date).

== Later career ==
In 1975 Hustin hosted a series of programmes called La Guimbarde for Belgian television channel RTBF, which featured singers and musicians from Wallonia.

Hustin continued recording and performing until the late 1980s, when he decided to bring his musical career to a close in order to concentrate on painting. He ran an art workshop in the Belgian Ardennes for ten years, and continued to paint up until his death.

== Death ==
Hustin died of undisclosed causes on 6 April 2009, aged 69.

Preceded by Nicole & Hugo with "Baby, Baby"	Belgium in the Eurovision Song Contest; 1974	Succeeded by Ann Christy with "Gelukkig zijn"
