= Natati La Khayay =

1974 song by Kaveret

Single by Poogy
- Language: Hebrew
- Released: 1974
- Composer: Danny Sanderson
- Lyricists: Danny Sanderson; Alon Oleartchik

Eurovision Song Contest 1974 entry
- Country: Israel
- Artist: Kaveret
- As: Poogy
- Language: Hebrew
- Composer: Danny Sanderson
- Lyricists: Danny Sanderson; Alon Oleartchik
- Conductor: Yoni Rechter

Finals performance
- Final result: 7th
- Final points: 11

Entry chronology
- ◄ "Ey Sham" (1973)
- "At Va'Ani" (1975) ►

"Natati La Khayay" (Hebrew script: נתתי לה חיי, lit. 'I gave her my life'; the translation used by the band is "She looked me in the eye") is a song performed in Hebrew by the Israeli band Kaveret, conveying both romantic and political message. The song represented Israel in the Eurovision Song Contest 1974 which was recorded in several other languages, including a cover by internationally known Joe Dassin.

A musical featuring Kaveret's songs, which ran at Israel's national theatre Habima, is titled after the song. A cover version by one of Israel's most popular singers Sarit Hadad resulted in controversy over music styles and ethnicity, involving one of the band's members, other artists and Israeli parliament figures. The original version topped Israel's national Hebrew chart in 1974 as the song of the year.

== Lyrics and political context ==
Typically for the band, the lyrics are full of unusual imagery. With humour and irony, the song deals, at least in part, with the power of love and its failure, as in lines such as "if she refused / there's no hope", and "Someone says that his sky is ending/When there’s enough air for a nation or two". It has been first suggested, and since confirmed by band member Danny Sanderson, that the song also contained a veiled political protest against then-prime minister Golda Meir, and in favour of the creation of a Palestinian state alongside Israel.

A double-track record containing the song with English lyrics under the title "She Looked Me in the Eye", and another successful song of the band in an English cover, was released to the European market. Internationally known French singer Joe Dassin recorded and performed a French version entitled "Le service militaire" which deals with the experience of military service.

== Eurovision Song Contest ==
The members of "Kaveret", the Hebrew-meaning for "beehive", performed under the name Poogy for the occasion as well as on their other performances abroad, after their nickname to band drummer, Meir Fenigstein. As Kaveret included seven members while the rules of the competition allowed a maximum of six performers on the stage, the band's keyboard player Yoni Rechter served as the orchestra conductor.

The song was performed sixth on the night, following Greece's Marinella with "Krasi, thalassa kai t' agori mou" and preceding Yugoslavia's Korni Grupa with "Moja generacija". At the close of voting, it had received 11 points, placing seventh in a field of 17. It was succeeded as Israeli representative at the 1975 contest by Shlomo Artzi with "At Va'Ani".

== Sarit Hadad cover controversy ==
Sarit Hadad, one of Israel's most popular singers and also the country's representative, at the 2002 edition of the Eurovision Song Contest, covered the song in 2018 in a different music style, which resulted in feuds between one of the band members and other artists and Israeli parliament figures who spoke against him.

Hadad was approached with the idea to renew an Israeli classic, and thought it needs to be something from Kaveret's repertoire. A Caucasus Jew, Hadad focuses her performance and recording in Mizrahi-eastern styles, including her cover version for the song, which incorporates instrumentation of clapping and goblet drumming with vocal of trill timbre, focusing on oriental dissonant arrangement compared to the Kaveret's original.

The cover received both positive and negative views. Kaveret member Efraim Shamir opined by comparing it to the militant Sunni Islamist group, saying: "Disgusting, Isil with a song", added that she "ruined the song" and mocked that the medical situation of another Kaveret member, Yitzhak Klepter "may have deteriorated after hearing this atrocity". Following previous remarks of Shamir dismissing Israeli eastern styles, his reaction to Hadad's version caused uproar across the Israeli music scene.

Soon after the publication of his views, many Israelis went out to Hadad's defense, as well as Minister of Culture and Sports, Miri Regev who claimed that Shamir is "racist and embarrassing" while adding that Hadad's interpretation is "perfect". Shamir replied to Regev: "You are an uncivilized, loudmouth, liar and a proud vulgar". On the other hand, Kaveret's other Member, Danny Sanderson opined that "the interpretation of Hadad is neat. Respect".

== Chart positions ==
"Natati la khayay" was voted the most popular song in Israel in 1974, as it topped the official Israeli annual Hebrew song chart, on the radio channel Reshet Gimmel which was operated by Kol Yisrael.

=== Year-end charts ===
Chart (1974)	Position
Kol Yisrael	1
