= Switzerland in the Eurovision Song Contest 1966 =

- Eurovision Song Contest 1966
- Participating broadcaster: Swiss Broadcasting Corporation (SRG SSR)
- Country: Switzerland
- Selection process: Finale suisse du Grand Prix Eurovision
- Selection date: 5 February 1966

Competing entry
- Song: "Ne vois-tu pas ?"
- Artist: Madeleine Pascal
- Songwriters: Pierre Brenner; Roland Schweizer

Placement
- Final result: 6th, 12 points

Participation chronology

Switzerland was represented at the Eurovision Song Contest 1966 with the song "Ne vois-tu pas ?", composed by Pierre Brenner, with lyrics by Roland Schweizer, and performed by Madeleine Pascal. The Swiss participating broadcaster, the Swiss Broadcasting Corporation (SRG SSR), selected its entry through a national final.

== Before Eurovision ==
=== Finale suisse du Grand Prix Eurovision ===
The Swiss Broadcasting Corporation (SRG SSR) held a national final to select its entry for the Eurovision Song Contest 1966. The broadcaster received 26 submissions and ultimately selected six songs to take part in the selection, with two songs being performed each in French, German, and Italian.

Competing entries
Broadcaster	Artist	Song	Songwriter(s)		Language
Broadcaster	Artist	Song	Composer(s)	Lyricist(s)	Language
TSR	Madeleine Pascal	"Ne vois-tu pas ?"	Pierre Brenner	Roland Schweizer	French
TSR	Joël Holmès	"Je reviendrai, Sylvie"	Antonio D'Addario	Charles Brunschwiler; Georges Chorafas	French
TSI	Anna Identici	"Uno ha bisogno dell'altro"	Mario Robbiani	Giorgio Calabrese	Italian
TSI	Gino	"Impara e tacere"	Grytzko Mascioni; Iller Pattacini		Italian
DRS	Peter & Alex	"Die Strasse voller Lichter"	Hazy Osterwald	Kurt Feltz	German
DRS	Brigitt Petry	"Glücklich sein"	Hans Moeckel	Ernest Amort	German

Swiss French broadcaster Télévision suisse romande (TSR) staged the national final on 5 February 1966 at 20:20 CET (19:20 UTC) in Geneva. It was presented by Heidi Abel, Mascia Cantoni, and Madeleine Demartines. Joe Waldys made a guest appearance.

The voting consisted of 12 national juries, whose members gave 3 points to their favorite song, 2 to their second favorite, and 1 to their third favorite. The winner was the song "Ne vois-tu pas ?" composed by Pierre Brenner, written by Roland Schweizer, and performed by Madeleine Pascal, who reportedly won by a landslide.

Final – 5 February 1966
R/O	Artist(s)	Song
1	Madeleine Pascal	"Ne vois-tu pas ?"
2	Joël Holmès	"Je reviendrai, Sylvie"
3	Anna Identici	"Uno ha bisogno dell'altro"
4	Gino	"Impara e tacere"
5	Peter & Alex	"Die Strasse voller Lichter"
6	Brigitt Petry	"Glücklich sein"

=== Releases ===
"Ne vois-tu pas ?" by Madeleine Pascal was recorded and released on an EP under the same title in 1966. A Spanish version of the song titled "¿Tu No Ves?" was later released in a single titled "¿Tu No Ves? / Elegí La Libertad" that same year. In 1998, the song was featured in a CD compilation titled "Concours Eurovision De La Chanson 1956-1998: Schweizer Beiträge", which compiled every Swiss Eurovision entry at the time.

Apart from the winning song, both of the Italian songs in the selection were recorded and released commercially; "Uno ha bisogno dell'altro" by Anna Identici, which first appeared on an album named after her and in the B-side of a single titled "Una Rosa Da Vienna" in 1966., and "Impara e tacere" by Gino, which appeared on a single titled "Un Uomo Un Mestiere".

== At Eurovision ==
At the Eurovision Song Contest 1966 in Luxembourg, the Swiss entry was the twelfth song of the night following Spain and preceding Monaco. The Swiss entry was conducted by Jean Roderès, who reprised his role as the musical director of the contest after doing the same in 1962. At the close of voting, Switzerland had received twelve points and finished sixth among the eighteen participants.

The contest was broadcast on SRG SSR via TV DRS (with commentary from Hans-Joachim Rauschenbach) in German-speaking Switzerland, TSR and Radio Sottens in Romandy, and TSI in Ticino.

=== Voting ===
Each participating broadcaster assembled a ten-member jury panel. Every jury member could distribute 9 points in 3 different ways depending on how the jurors voted; 5, 3, and 1 points to their 3 favorite songs, 6 and 3 points to their 2 favorite songs, or 9 points to a single song. The 1966 contest was the last edition to utilize this voting system, as the voting system from 1967 to 1970 reused the 10-member expert jury system.

Points awarded to Switzerland
Score	Country
5 points	Austria
3 points	Ireland; Monaco
1 point	Luxembourg

Points awarded by Switzerland
Score	Country
5 points	Germany
3 points	Austria
1 point	Sweden
