= Switzerland in the Eurovision Song Contest =

- Eurovision Song Contest
- Participating broadcaster: Swiss Broadcasting Corporation (SRG SSR)

Participation summary
- Appearances: 66 (54 finals)
- First appearance: 1956
- Highest placement: 1st: 1956, 1988, 2024
- Host: 1956, 1989, 2025
- Participation history: 1956; 1957; 1958; 1959; 1960; 1961; 1962; 1963; 1964; 1965; 1966; 1967; 1968; 1969; 1970; 1971; 1972; 1973; 1974; 1975; 1976; 1977; 1978; 1979; 1980; 1981; 1982; 1983; 1984; 1985; 1986; 1987; 1988; 1989; 1990; 1991; 1992; 1993; 1994; 1995; 1996; 1997; 1998; 1999; 2000; 2001; 2002; 2003; 2004; 2005; 2006; 2007; 2008; 2009; 2010; 2011; 2012; 2013; 2014; 2015; 2016; 2017; 2018; 2019; ~~2020~~; 2021; 2022; 2023; 2024; 2025; 2026

External links
- SRF page; RTS page; RSI page
- Switzerland's page at Eurovision.com
- For the most recent participation see Switzerland in the Eurovision Song Contest 2026

Switzerland has been represented at the Eurovision Song Contest 66 times since its debut at the first contest in 1956, missing only four contests because of being relegated due to poor results the previous year: 1995, 1999, 2001, and 2003. Switzerland hosted the inaugural contest in 1956 in Lugano, where it also won. The country claimed its second victory in 1988, 32 years after the first, and its third in 2024, 36 years after the second win. The Swiss participating broadcaster in the contest is the Swiss Broadcasting Corporation (SRG SSR).

"Refrain" performed by Lys Assia won the inaugural contest in 1956 for Switzerland; she returned to place second in 1958 with "Giorgio". The country achieved second place with "T'en va pas" by Esther Ofarim (1963) and "Pas pour moi" by Daniela Simmons (1986), and third place with "Nous aurons demain" by Franca di Rienzo (1961) and "Amour on t'aime" by Arlette Zola (1982). It won for the second time in 1988 with "Ne partez pas sans moi" performed by Céline Dion. "Moi, tout simplement" by Annie Cotton secured Switzerland's 15th top-five finish by placing third in 1993.

Since the introduction of the qualifying round in 1993, Switzerland has reached the top ten six times. Since the semi-final round's inception in 2004, the country has failed to reach the final in 12 of 19 contests, finishing last in the semi-final on four occasions.Since 2019, qualified for the final every year until 2026, when it did not qualify. Switzerland returned to the top five after 26 years when "She Got Me" by Luca Hänni finished fourth in 2019, achieving the country's 16th top-five result. This was followed by "Tout l'univers" by Gjon's Tears placing third in 2021, marking the 17th top-five finish. Switzerland won the contest for the third time in 2024, with "The Code" by Nemo. The country has also finished last in the semi-finals four times since 2004, with "Celebrate" by Piero and the MusicStars (2004), "Il pleut de l'or" by Michael von der Heide (2010), "Time to Shine" by Mélanie René (2015), and "The Last of Our Kind" by Rykka (2016).

== Participation overview ==
Table key
1	First place
2	Second place
3	Third place
◁	Last place
◇	Entry selected but did not compete
†	Upcoming event

Year	Artist	Song	Language	Final	Points	Semi	Points
1956	Lys Assia	"Das alte Karussell"	German	—N/a (Note: The 1956 contest had secret voting and, apart from the winner, no results were released.)	—N/a	No semi-finals	
1956	Lys Assia	"Refrain"	French	1	—N/a	No semi-finals	
1957	Lys Assia	"L'Enfant que j'étais"	French	8	5	No semi-finals	
1958	Lys Assia	"Giorgio"	German, Italian	2	24	No semi-finals	
1959	Christa Williams	"Irgendwoher"	German	4	14	No semi-finals	
1960	Anita Traversi	"Cielo e terra"	Italian	8	5	No semi-finals	
1961	Franca di Rienzo	"Nous aurons demain"	French	3	16	No semi-finals	
1962	Jean Philippe	"Le Retour"	French	10	2	No semi-finals	
1963	Esther Ofarim	"T'en va pas"	French	2	40	No semi-finals	
1964	Anita Traversi	"I miei pensieri"	Italian	13 ◁	0	No semi-finals	
1965	Yovanna	"Non, à jamais sans toi"	French	8	8	No semi-finals	
1966	Madeleine Pascal	"Ne vois-tu pas ?"	French	6	12	No semi-finals	
1967	Géraldine	"Quel cœur vas-tu briser ?"	French	17 ◁	0	No semi-finals	
1968	Gianni Mascolo	"Guardando il sole"	Italian	13	2	No semi-finals	
1969	Paola	"Bonjour, bonjour"	German	5	13	No semi-finals	
1970	Henri Dès	"Retour"	French	4	8	No semi-finals	
1971	Peter, Sue and Marc	"Les Illusions de nos vingt ans"	French	12	78	No semi-finals	
1972	Véronique Müller	"C'est la chanson de mon amour"	French	8	88	No semi-finals	
1973	Patrick Juvet	"Je vais me marier, Marie"	French	12	79	No semi-finals	
1974	Piera Martell	"Mein Ruf nach dir"	German	14 ◁	3	No semi-finals	
1975	Simone Drexel	"Mikado"	German	6	77	No semi-finals	
1976	Peter, Sue and Marc	"Djambo Djambo"	English	4	91	No semi-finals	
1977	Pepe Lienhard Band	"Swiss Lady"	German	6	71	No semi-finals	
1978	Carole Vinci	"Vivre"	French	9	65	No semi-finals	
1979	Peter, Sue and Marc, Pfuri, Gorps and Kniri	"Trödler und Co."	German	10	60	No semi-finals	
1980	Paola	"Cinéma"	French	4	104	No semi-finals	
1981	Peter, Sue and Marc	"Io senza te"	Italian	4	121	No semi-finals	
1982	Arlette Zola	"Amour on t'aime"	French	3	97	No semi-finals	
1983	Mariella Farré	"Io così non ci sto"	Italian	15	28	No semi-finals	
1984	Rainy Day	"Welche Farbe hat der Sonnenschein"	German	16	30	No semi-finals	
1985	Mariella Farré and Pino Gasparini	"Piano, piano"	German	12	39	No semi-finals	
1986	Daniela Simons	"Pas pour moi"	French	2	140	No semi-finals	
1987	Carol Rich	"Moitié moitié"	French	17	26	No semi-finals	
1988	Céline Dion	"Ne partez pas sans moi"	French	1	137	No semi-finals	
1989	Furbaz	"Viver senza tei"	Romansh	13	47	No semi-finals	
1990	Egon Egemann	"Musik klingt in die Welt hinaus"	German	11	51	No semi-finals	
1991	Sandra Simó	"Canzone per te"	Italian	5	118	No semi-finals	
1992	Daisy Auvray	"Mister Music Man"	French	15	32	No semi-finals	
1993	Annie Cotton	"Moi, tout simplement"	French	3	148	Kvalifikacija za Millstreet	
1994	Duilio	"Sto pregando"	Italian	19	15	No semi-finals	
1996	Kathy Leander	"Mon cœur l'aime"	French	16	22	8	67
1997	Barbara Berta	"Dentro di me"	Italian	22	5	No semi-finals	
1998	Gunvor	"Lass ihn"	German	25 ◁	0	No semi-finals	
2000	Jane Bogaert	"La vita cos'è?"	Italian	20	14	No semi-finals	
2002	Francine Jordi	"Dans le jardin de mon âme"	French	22	15	No semi-finals	
2004	Piero and the MusicStars	"Celebrate"	English	Failed to qualify		22 ◁	0
2005	Vanilla Ninja	"Cool Vibes"	English	8	128	8	114
2006	six4one	"If We All Give a Little"	English	16	30	Top 11 in 2005 final (Note: According to the then-Eurovision rules, the top ten non-Big Four countries from the previous year along with the Big Four automatically qualified for the grand final without having to compete in semi-finals. For example, if Germany and France placed inside the top ten, the 11th and 12th spots were advanced to the next year's grand final along with all countries ranked in the top ten.)	
2007	DJ BoBo	"Vampires Are Alive"	English	Failed to qualify		20	40
2008	Paolo Meneguzzi	"Era stupendo"	Italian	Failed to qualify		13	47
2009	Lovebugs	"The Highest Heights"	English	Failed to qualify		14	15
2010	Michael von der Heide	"Il pleut de l'or"	French	Failed to qualify		17 ◁	2
2011	Anna Rossinelli	"In Love for a While"	English	25 ◁	19	10	55
2012	Sinplus	"Unbreakable"	English	Failed to qualify		11	45
2013	Takasa	"You and Me"	English	Failed to qualify		13	41
2014	Sebalter	"Hunter of Stars"	English	13	64	4	92
2015	Mélanie René	"Time to Shine"	English	Failed to qualify		17 ◁	4
2016	Rykka	"The Last of Our Kind"	English	Failed to qualify		18 ◁	28
2017	Timebelle	"Apollo"	English	Failed to qualify		12	97
2018	Zibbz	"Stones"	English	Failed to qualify		13	86
2019	Luca Hänni	"She Got Me"	English	4	364	4	232
2020	Gjon's Tears ◇	"Répondez-moi" ◇	French ◇	Contest cancelled (Note: The 2020 contest was cancelled due to the COVID-19 pandemic.)			
2021	Gjon's Tears	"Tout l'univers"	French	3	432	1	291
2022	Marius Bear	"Boys Do Cry"	English	17	78	9	118
2023	Remo Forrer	"Watergun"	English	20	92	7	97
2024	Nemo	"The Code"	English	1	591	4	132
2025	Zoë Më	"Voyage"	French	10	214	Host country	
2026	Veronica Fusaro	"Alice"	English	Failed to qualify		11	108
2027	Confirmed intention to participate †						

=== Congratulations: 50 Years of the Eurovision Song Contest ===
Artist	Song	Language	At Congratulations				At Eurovision		
Artist	Song	Language	Final	Points	Semi	Points	Year	Place	Points
Céline Dion	"Ne partez pas sans moi"	French	Failed to qualify		10	98	1988	1	137

== Trivia ==
The Swiss Broadcasting Corporation (SRG SSR) is a full member of the European Broadcasting Union (EBU), thus eligible to participate in the Eurovision Song Contest. It has participated in the contest representing Switzerland since the first contest in 1956.

Switzerland has four official languages, French, German, Italian, and Romansh. For intermittent periods prior to its abolition in 1999, the rules stated that the song had to be performed in an official language, which gave SRG SSR leeway as it could submit entries in any of the four languages. Out of its 65 appearances in the contest, it has sent 66 songs, 25 of which were in French, (Note: The selected Swiss entry for the cancelled 2020 contest was also sung in French.) 12 in German, 18 in English, 10 in Italian, and one in Romansh. The first two of Switzerland's winning songs were sung in French, with the third being sung in English.

=== Selection methods ===
SRG SSR has used a mix of different selection processes to determine its entry in each year's contest. Since 2019, it has used an internal selection process, although televised national finals were used in previous years, held under various names including Concours Eurovision from the 1950s to 2000s, and Die Grosse Entscheidungsshow between 2011 and 2018. Starting in 1986, the Swiss national finals tended to have ten participating songs each year: three in French, three in German, three in Italian, and one in Romansch.

1. National selection: (62.7%)
2. Internal selection: (35.8%)
3. Internal selection among songs from national selection: (1.49%)

Songs	Selection methods	Years
42	Artist and song with national selections	1956, 1957, 1959, 1960, 1961, 1963, 1964, 1965, 1966, 1967, 1968, 1973, 1974, 1975, 1976, 1977, 1978, 1979, 1981, 1982, 1983, 1984, 1985, 1986, 1987, 1988, 1989, 1990, 1991, 1993, 1998, 2000, 2002, 2004, 2011, 2012, 2013, 2014, 2015, 2016, 2017, 2018
24	Artist and song with internal selections	1958, 1962, 1969, 1970, 1971, 1972, 1980, 1994, 1996, 1997, 2005, 2006, 2007, 2008, 2009, 2010, 2019, ~~2020~~, 2021, 2022, 2023, 2024, 2025, 2026
1	Internally selection among songs from national selection after being held	1992

=== Songs by language ===
1. French (38.2%)
2. English (27.9%)
3. German (16.5%)
4. Italian (15.8%)
5. Romansh (1.47%)

Songs	Language	Years
26	French	1956, 1957, 1961, 1962, 1963, 1965, 1966, 1967, 1970, 1971, 1972, 1973, 1978, 1980, 1982, 1986, 1987, 1988, 1992, 1993, 1996, 2002, 2010, ~~2020~~, 2021, 2025
19	English	1976, 2004, 2005, 2006, 2007, 2009, 2011, 2012, 2013, 2014, 2015, 2016, 2017, 2018, 2019, 2022, 2023, 2024, 2026
12	German	1956, 1958, 1959, 1969, 1974, 1975, 1977, 1979, 1984, 1985, 1990, 1998
11	Italian	1958, 1960, 1964, 1968, 1981, 1983, 1991, 1994, 1997, 2000, 2008
1	Romansh	1989

== Hostings ==
Year	Location	Venue	Presenter(s)
1956	Lugano	Teatro Kursaal	Lohengrin Filipello
1989	Lausanne	Palais de Beaulieu	Lolita Morena and Jacques Deschenaux
2025	Basel	St. Jakobshalle	Hazel Brugger, Sandra Studer (all shows) and Michelle Hunziker (final)

== Awards ==
=== Marcel Bezençon Awards ===
Year	Category	Song	Composer(s) lyrics (l) / music (m)	Performer	Final	Points	Host city	Ref.
2021	Composer Award	"Tout l'univers"	Gjon Muharremaj, Xavier Michel, Wouter Hardy & Nina Sampermans (m & l)	Gjon's Tears	3	432	(Netherlands) Rotterdam	
2024	Composer Award; Artistic Award (Note: Voted by the national commentators.)	"The Code"	Benjamin Alasu, Lasse Midtsian Nymann, Linda Dale, & Nemo Mettler (m & l)	Nemo	1	591	(Sweden) Malmö	
2025	Composer Award	"Voyage"	Emily Middlemas, Tom Oehler, & Zoë Anina Kressler (m & l)	Zoë Më	10	214	(Switzerland) Basel	

== Related involvement ==
=== Conductors ===
Year	Conductor (Note: All conductors are of Swiss nationality unless otherwise noted.)	Notes	Ref.
1956	Fernando Paggi	(Note: Also conducted the Dutch and German entries.)	
1957	(Germany) Willy Berking	(Note: Host conductor)	
1958	Paul Burkhard		
1959	(France) Franck Pourcel	(Note: Host conductor)	
1960	Cédric Dumont		
1961	Fernando Paggi		
1962	Cédric Dumont		
1963	(United Kingdom) Eric Robinson	(Note: Host conductor)	
1964	Fernando Paggi		
1965	Mario Robbiani		
1966	(Luxembourg) Jean Roderes	(Note: Host conductor)	
1967	Hans Moeckel		
1968	Mario Robbiani		
1969	(Germany) Henry Mayer		
1970	(France) Bernard Gérard		
1971	Hardy Schneiders		
1972	(France) Jean-Pierre Festi		
1973	(France) Hervé Roy		
1974	(Germany) Pepe Ederer		
1975	Peter Jacques		
1976	Mario Robbiani		
1977	Peter Jacques		
1978	(France) Daniel Janin		
1979	(Germany) Rolf Zuckowski		
1980	Peter Reber		
1981	(Germany) Rolf Zuckowski		
1982	(Spain) Joan Amils		
1983	Robert Weber	(Note: Conducted at the national final by Hans Moeckel)	
1984	Mario Robbiani		
1985	Anita Kerr		
1986	(Turkey) (Switzerland) Atilla Şereftuğ		
1987	No conductor		
1988	(Turkey) (Switzerland) Atilla Şereftuğ		
1989	(France) Benoît Kaufman	(Note: Also conducted the Luxembourgish entry and half of the Danish entry.)	
1990	Bela Balint		
1991	(Italy) Flaviano Cuffari		
1992	Roby Seidel		
1993	Marc Sorrentino		
1994	(Italy) Valeriano Chiaravalle		
1996	(Portugal) (Switzerland) Rui dos Reis		
1997	(Italy) Pietro Damiani		
1998	No conductor		

=== Heads of delegation ===
Each participating broadcaster in the Eurovision Song Contest assigns a head of delegation as the EBU's contact person and the leader of their delegation at the event. The delegation, whose size can greatly vary, includes a head of press, the performers, songwriters, composers, and backing vocalists, among others.

Year	Head of delegation	Ref.
2016–2021	Reto Peritz	
2022–2024	Yves Schifferle	
2025	Daniel Meister	
2026	Yves Schifferle	

=== Commentators and spokespersons ===
SRG SSR has broadcast the contest in Switzerland on its three television stations: German-language Schweizer Radio und Fernsehen (SRF), French-language Radio Télévision Suisse (RTS), and Italian-language Radiotelevisione svizzera di lingua italiana (RSI). Additionally, the final of the 2025 contest was broadcast on Romansh-language Radio RTR.

Television broadcasts, commentators and spokespersons
Year	Swiss German (SRF)		Swiss French (RTS)		Swiss Italian (RSI)		Spokesperson	Ref.
Year	Channel	Commentator(s)	Channel	Commentator(s)	Channel	Commentator(s)	Spokesperson	Ref.
1956	SRG	Fritz Schäuffele	TSR	Raymond Colbert	No television broadcast		No spokesperson	
1957	SRG	Unknown	TSR	Robert Beauvais (Note: Commentary provided by France's RTF)	No television broadcast		Unknown	
1958	TV DRS	Unknown	TSR	Georges Hardy	No television broadcast		Unknown	
1959	TV DRS	Unknown	TSR	Unknown	TSI	Unknown	Unknown	
1960	TV DRS	Theodor Haller	TSR	Unknown	TSI	Unknown	Unknown	
1961	TV DRS	Unknown	TSR	Robert Beauvais	TSI	Unknown	Unknown	
1962	TV DRS	Unknown	TSR	Pierre Tchernia	TSI	Giovanni Bertini	Unknown	
1963	TV DRS	Theodor Haller	TSR	Georges Hardy	TSI	Renato Tagliani (Note: Commentary provided by Italy's RAI)	Unknown	
1964	TV DRS	Unknown	TSR	Robert Burnier	TSI	Unknown	Unknown	
1965	TV DRS	Unknown	TSR	Jean Charles	TSI	Unknown	Unknown	
1966	TV DRS	Hans-Joachim Rauschenbach (Note: Commentary provided by Germany's ARD)	TSR	Unknown	TSI	Unknown	Unknown	
1967	TV DRS	Unknown	TSR	Robert Burnier	TSI	Unknown	Unknown	
1968	TV DRS	Theodor Haller	TSR	Georges Hardy	TSI	Unknown	Unknown	
1969	TV DRS	Unknown	TSR	Georges Hardy	TSI	Unknown	Unknown	
1970	TV DRS	Unknown	TSR	Georges Hardy	TSI	Unknown	Unknown	
1971	TV DRS	Theodor Haller	TSR	Georges Hardy	TSI	Unknown	No spokesperson	
1972	TV DRS	Theodor Haller	TSR	Georges Hardy	TSI	Unknown	No spokesperson	
1973	TV DRS	Theodor Haller	TSR	Georges Hardy	TSI	Unknown	No spokesperson	
1974	TV DRS	Theodor Haller	TSR	Georges Hardy	TSI	Unknown	Unknown	
1975	TV DRS	Unknown	TSR	Georges Hardy	TSI	Unknown	Unknown	
1976	TV DRS	Theodor Haller	TSR	Georges Hardy	TSI	Unknown	Unknown	
1977	TV DRS	Theodor Haller	TSR	Georges Hardy	TSI	Unknown	Unknown	
1978	TV DRS	Theodor Haller	TSR	Georges Hardy	TSI	Unknown	Unknown	
1979	TV DRS	Max Rüeger	TSR	Georges Hardy	TSI	Unknown	Unknown	
1980	TV DRS	Theodor Haller	TSR	Georges Hardy	TSI	Unknown	Unknown	
1981	TV DRS	Theodor Haller	TSR	Georges Hardy	TSI	Giovanni Bertini	Unknown	
1982	TV DRS	Theodor Haller	TSR	Georges Hardy	TSI	Giovanni Bertini	Unknown	
1983	TV DRS	Theodor Haller	TSR	Georges Hardy	TSI	Giovanni Bertini	Unknown	
1984	TV DRS	Bernard Thurnheer	TSR	Serge Moisson	TSI	Unknown	Unknown	
1985	TV DRS	Bernard Thurnheer	TSR	Serge Moisson	TSI	Unknown	Unknown	
1986	TV DRS	Bernard Thurnheer	TSR	Serge Moisson	TSI	Unknown	Unknown	
1987	SRG Sportkette	Bernard Thurnheer	SSR Chaîne Sportive	Serge Moisson	SSR Canale Sportivo	Unknown	Unknown	
1988	SRG Sportkette	Bernard Thurnheer	SSR Chaîne Sportive	Serge Moisson	SSR Canale Sportivo	Giovanni Bertini	Unknown	
1989	TV DRS	Bernard Thurnheer	TSR	Thierry Masselot	TSI	Giovanni Bertini	Unknown	
1990	SRG Sportkette	Bernard Thurnheer	SSR Chaîne Sportive	Unknown	SSR Canale Sportivo	Unknown	Unknown	
1991	TV DRS	Bernard Thurnheer	TSR Chaîne nationale	Lolita Morena	TSI Canale nationale	Unknown	Unknown	
1992	TV DRS	Mariano Tschuor	TSR Chaîne nationale	Ivan Frésard	TSI Canale nationale	Unknown	Unknown	
1993	SF DRS	Bernard Thurnheer	TSR Chaîne nationale	Jean-Marc Richard	TSI Canale nationale	Emanuela Gaggini	Unknown	
1994	SF DRS	Bernard Thurnheer	TSR Chaîne nationale	Jean-Marc Richard	TSI Canale nationale	Unknown	Sandra Studer	
1995	Schweiz 4	Heinz Margot	Suisse 4	Jean-Marc Richard	Unknown		Did not participate	
1996	Schweiz 4	Heinz Margot	TSR	Pierre Grandjean	Unknown		Yves Ménestrier	
1997	Schweiz 4	Sandra Studer	TSR	Pierre Grandjean	TSI	Unknown	Sandy Altermatt	
1998	SF 2	Unknown	TSR 1	Jean-Marc Richard	TSI 1	Jonathan Tedesco	Regula Elsener	
1999	SF 2	Sandra Studer	TSR 1	Jean-Marc Richard	TSI 2	Unknown	Did not participate	
2000	SF 2	Sandra Studer	TSR 1	Jean-Marc Richard	TSI 1	Jonathan Tedesco	Astrid von Stockar	
2001	SF 2	Sandra Studer	TSR 1	Phil Mundwiller	TSI 1	Unknown	Did not participate	
2002	SF 2	Sandra Studer	TSR 1	Phil Mundwiller	TSI 1	Jonathan Tedesco	Diana Jörg	
2003	SF 2	Roman Kilchsperger	TSR 1	Jean-Marc Richard and Alain Morisod	TSI 1	Daniele Rauseo	Did not participate	
2004	SF 2 (Semi-final); SF 1 (Final)	Marco Fritsche (Semi-final); Sandra Studer (Final)	TSR 2 (Semi-final); TSR 1 (Final)	Jean-Marc Richard and Alain Morisod	TSI 1	Unknown	Emel Aykanat	
2005	SF 2 (Semi-final); SF 1 (Final)	Sandra Studer	TSR 2 (Semi-final); TSR 1 (Final)	Jean-Marc Richard and Marie-Thérèse Porchet	TSI 2 (Semi-final); TSI 1 (Final)	Daniela Tami and Claudio Lazzarino	Cécile Bähler	
2006	SF 2 (Semi-final); SF 1 (Final)	Sandra Studer	TSR 2 (Semi-final); TSR 1 (Final)	Jean-Marc Richard and Alain Morisod	TSI 2 (Semi-final); TSI 1 (Final)	Unknown	Jubaira Bachmann	
2007	SF 2 (Semi-final); SF 1 (Final)	Bernard Thurnheer	TSR 2	Nicolas Tanner (Semi-final); Henri Dès (Final); Jean-Marc Richard (All shows)	TSI 2 (Semi-final); TSI 1 (Final)	Unknown	Sven Epiney	
2008	SF zwei (SF2/Final); HD suisse (Final)	Sven Epiney	TSR 2 (SF2/Final)	Jean-Marc Richard and Nicolas Tanner	TSI 2 (SF2); TSI 1 (Final)	Sandy Altermatt	Cécile Bähler	
2009	SF zwei (SF1/Final)	Sven Epiney	TSR 2 (SF1/Final)	Jean-Marc Richard (SF1/Final); Nicolas Tanner (Final)	RSI La 2 (SF1); RSI La 1 (Final)	Sandy Altermatt	Cécile Bähler	
2010	SF zwei	Sven Epiney	TSR 2	Jean-Marc Richard and Nicolas Tanner	RSI La 1	Sandy Altermatt	Christa Rigozzi	
2011	SF zwei (SF1/Final)	Sven Epiney	TSR 2 (SF1/Final)	Nicolas Tanner (Semi-final); Henri Dès (Final); Jean-Marc Richard (All shows)	RSI La 2 (Semi-finals); RSI La 1 (Final)	Jonathan Tedesco	Cécile Bähler	
2012	SF zwei (SF1/Final)	Sven Epiney	RTS Deux (SF1/Final)	Jean-Marc Richard and Nicolas Tanner	RSI La 2 (SF1); RSI La 1 (Final)	Clarissa Tami and Paolo Meneguzzi	Sara Hildebrand	
2013	SF zwei (SF2); SRF 1 (Final)	Sven Epiney	RTS Deux (SF2/Final)	Jean-Marc Richard and Nicolas Tanner	RSI La 2 (SF2); RSI La 1 (Final)	Alessandro Bertoglio	Mélanie Freymond	
2014	SF zwei (Semi-finals); SRF 1 (Final)	Sven Epiney	RTS Deux (SF2); RTS Un (Final)	Jean-Marc Richard and Valérie Ogier	RSI La 2 (SF2); RSI La 1 (Final)	Sandy Altermatt and Alessandro Bertoglio	Kurt Aeschbacher	
2015	SF zwei (Semi-finals); SRF 1 (Final)	Peter Schneider and Gabriel Vetter (Final); Sven Epiney (All shows)	rts.ch (SF1); RTS Deux (SF2); RTS Un (Final)	Jean-Marc Richard and Nicolas Tanner	RSI La 2 (SF2); RSI La 1 (Final)	Clarissa Tami and Paolo Meneguzzi	Laetitia Guarino	
2015	srf.ch	Sign language interpreters	rts.ch (SF1); RTS Deux (SF2); RTS Un (Final)	Jean-Marc Richard and Nicolas Tanner	RSI La 2 (SF2); RSI La 1 (Final)	Clarissa Tami and Paolo Meneguzzi	Laetitia Guarino	
2016	SF zwei (Semi-finals); SRF 1 (Final)	Peter Schneider and Gabriel Vetter (Final); Sven Epiney (All shows)	RTS Deux (SF2/Final)	Jean-Marc Richard and Nicolas Tanner	RSI La 2 (SF2); RSI La 1 (Final)	Michele "Cerno" Carobbio (Final); Clarissa Tami (All shows)	Sebalter	
2017	SF zwei (Semi-finals); SRF 1 (Final)	Sven Epiney	RTS Deux (Semi-finals); RTS Un (Final)	Jean-Marc Richard and Nicolas Tanner	RSI La 2 (Semi-finals); RSI La 1 (Final)	Clarissa Tami and Sebalter	Luca Hänni	
2018	SF zwei (Semi-finals); SRF 1 (Final)	Sven Epiney	RTS Deux (SF2); RTS Un (Final)	Jean-Marc Richard and Nicolas Tanner	RSI La 2 (Semi-finals); RSI La 1 (Final)	Clarissa Tami	Letícia Carvalho	
2019	SF zwei (Semi-finals); SRF 1 (Final)	Sven Epiney	RTS Deux (Semi-finals); RTS Un (Final)	Bastian Baker (Final); Jean-Marc Richard and Nicolas Tanner (All shows)	RSI La 2 (SF2); RSI La 1 (Final)	Clarissa Tami and Sebalter	Sinplus	
~~2020~~	~~SF zwei (SF2)~~; ~~SRF 1 (Final)~~; ~~SRF info (All shows)~~	~~Sven Epiney~~	Not announced before cancellation					
2021	SF zwei (Semi-finals); SRF 1 (Final)	Sven Epiney	RTS 2 (Semi-finals); RTS 1 (Final)	Joseph Gorgoni (Final); Jean-Marc Richard and Nicolas Tanner (All shows)	RSI La 2 (SF2); RSI La 1 (Final)	Sebalter (Final); Clarissa Tami (All shows)	Angélique Beldner	
2022	SF zwei (Semi-finals); SRF info (SF2); SRF 1 (Final)	Sven Epiney	RTS 2 (Semi-finals); RTS 1 (Final)	Nicolas Tanner (Semi-finals); Gjon's Tears (Final); Jean-Marc Richard (All shows)	RSI La 2 (Semi-finals); RSI La 1 (Final)	Francesca Margiotta (SF1/Final); Boris Piffaretti (SF2/Final); Clarissa Tami (All shows)	Julie Berthollet	
2023	SF zwei (Semi-finals); SRF 1 (Final)	Sven Epiney	RTS 2 (Semi-finals); RTS 1 (Final)	Jean-Marc Richard, Nicolas Tanner and Priscilla Formaz	RSI La 2 (Semi-finals); RSI La 1 (Final)	Ellis Cavallini and Gian-Andrea Costa	Chiara Dubey	
2024	SF zwei (Semi-finals); SRF 1 (Final)	Sven Epiney	RTS 2 (Semi-finals); RTS 1 (Final)	Julie Berthollet (Final); Jean-Marc Richard and Nicolas Tanner (All shows)	RSI La 2 (Semi-finals); RSI La 1 (Final)	Ellis Cavallini and Gian-Andrea Costa	Jennifer Bosshard	
2025	SRF 1	Sven Epiney	RTS 1	Jean-Marc Richard and Nicolas Tanner	RSI La 2 (Semi-finals); RSI La 1 (Final)	Ellis Cavallini and Gian-Andrea Costa	Mélanie Freymond and Sven Epiney	
2025	SRF Play	Patti Basler	RTS 1	Jean-Marc Richard and Nicolas Tanner	RSI La 2 (Semi-finals); RSI La 1 (Final)	Ellis Cavallini and Gian-Andrea Costa	Mélanie Freymond and Sven Epiney	
2025	SRF info	Sign language interpreters	RTS 1	Jean-Marc Richard and Nicolas Tanner	RSI La 2 (Semi-finals); RSI La 1 (Final)	Ellis Cavallini and Gian-Andrea Costa	Mélanie Freymond and Sven Epiney	
2026	SF zwei (Semi-finals); SRF 1 (Final)	Sven Epiney	RTS 2 (Semi-finals); RTS 1 (Final)	Victoria Turrian and Nicolas Tanner	RSI La 1	Ellis Cavallini and Gian-Andrea Costa	Livio Chistell	

== Photo gallery ==
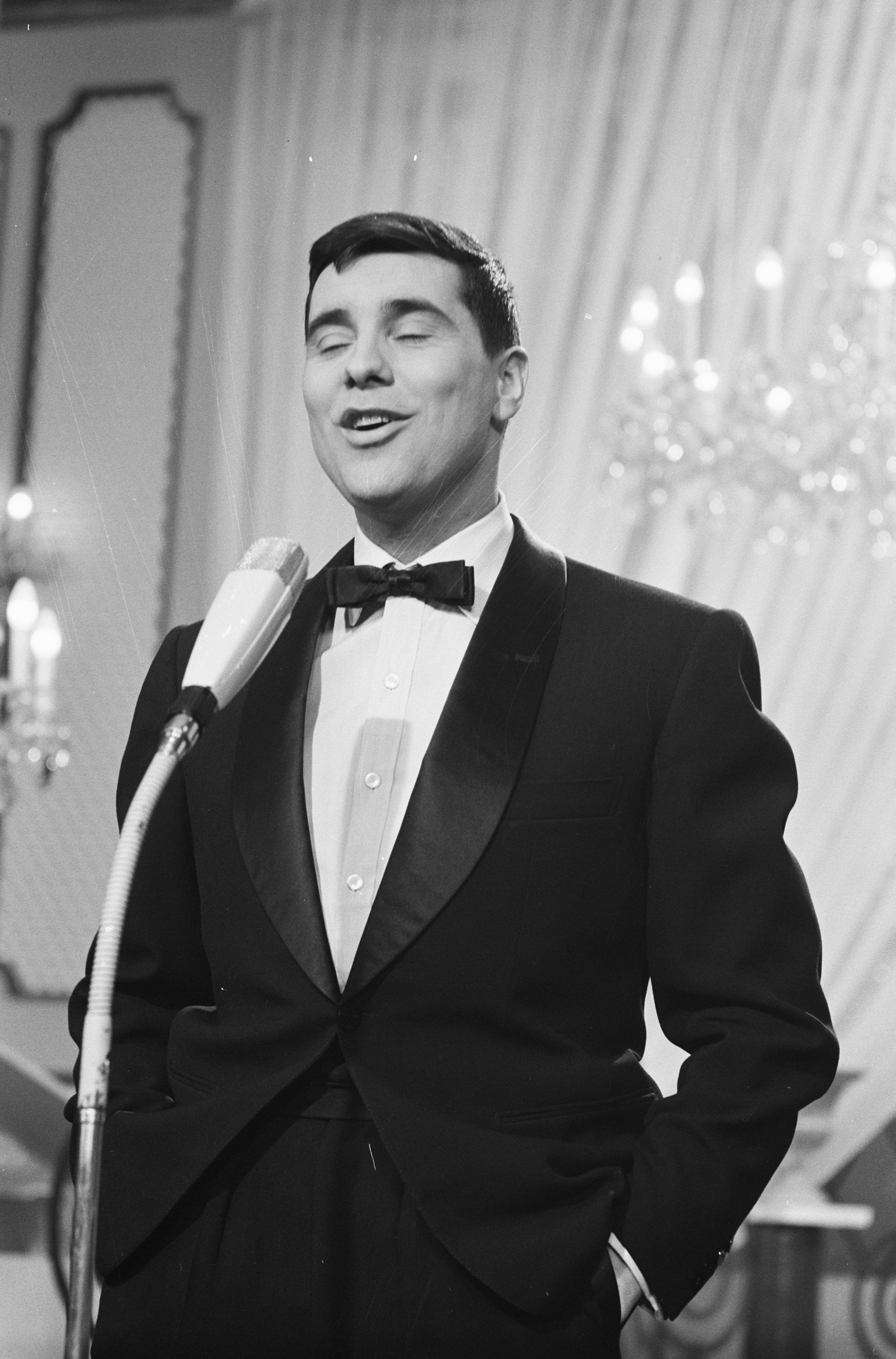
Jean Philippe in Luxembourg (1962)

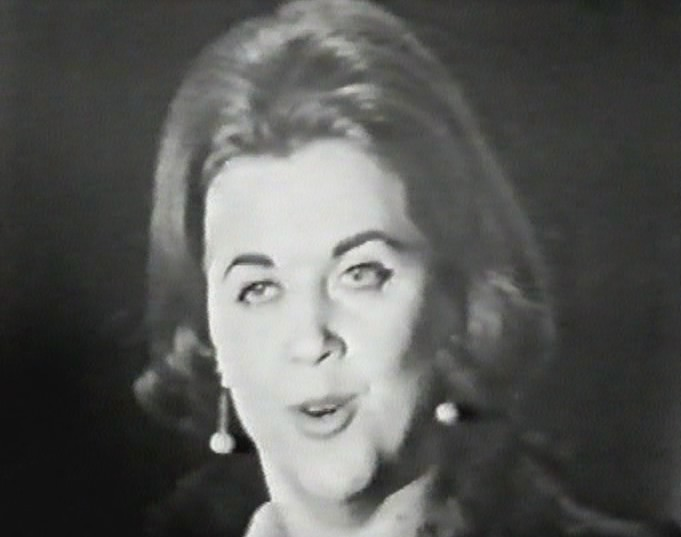
Yovanna in Naples (1965)

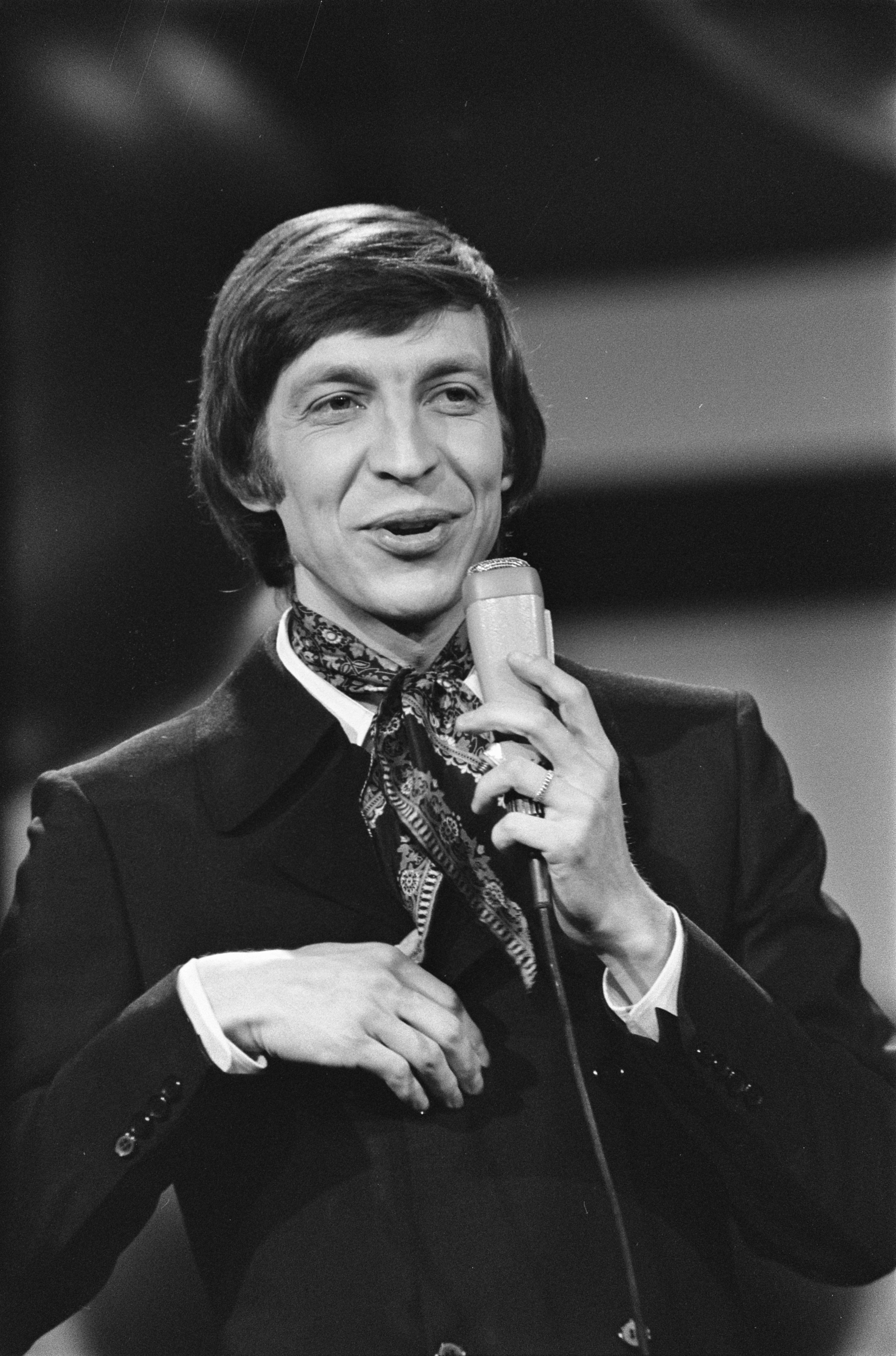
Henri Dès in Amsterdam (1970)

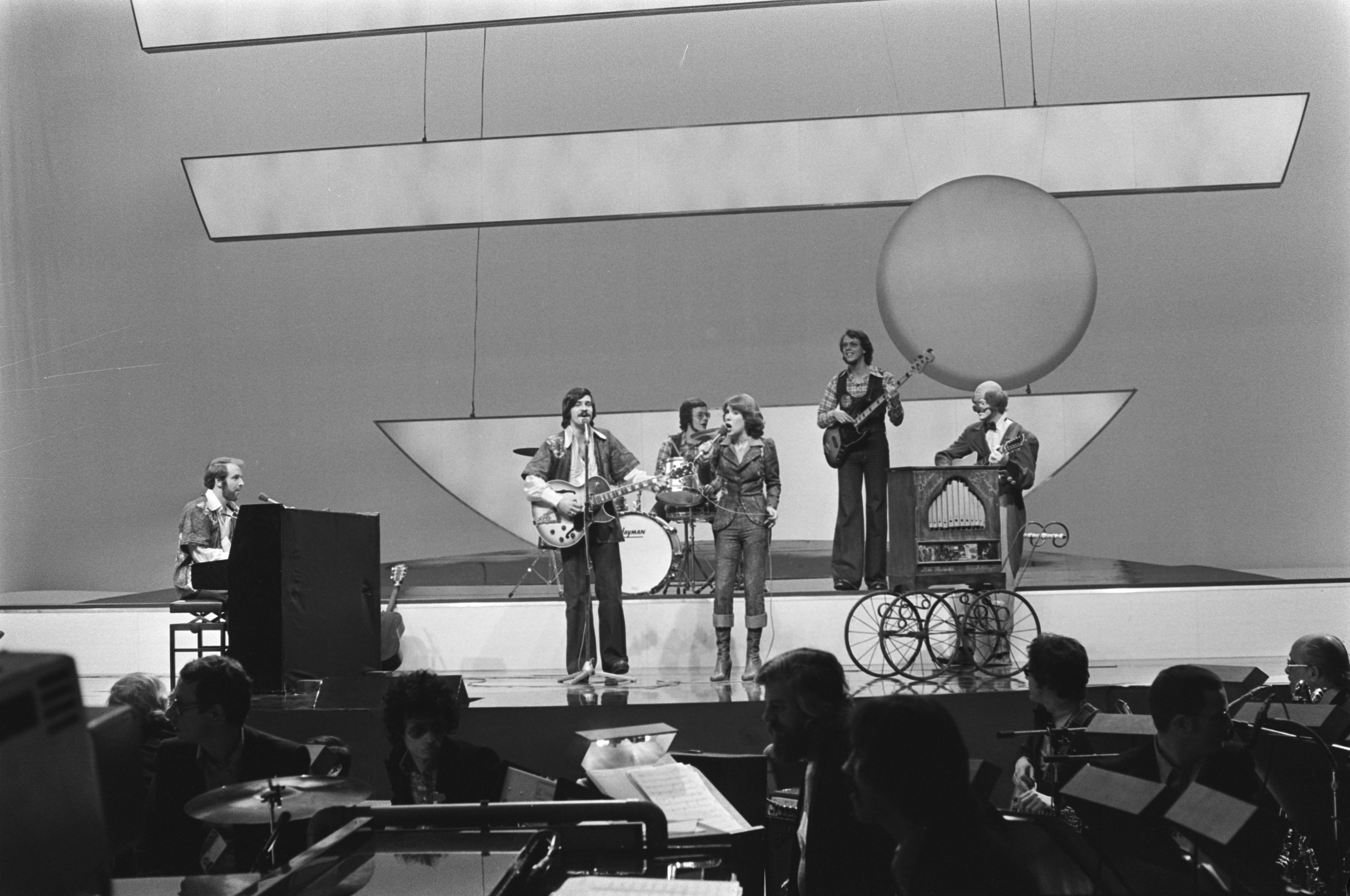
Peter, Sue and Marc in The Hague (1976)

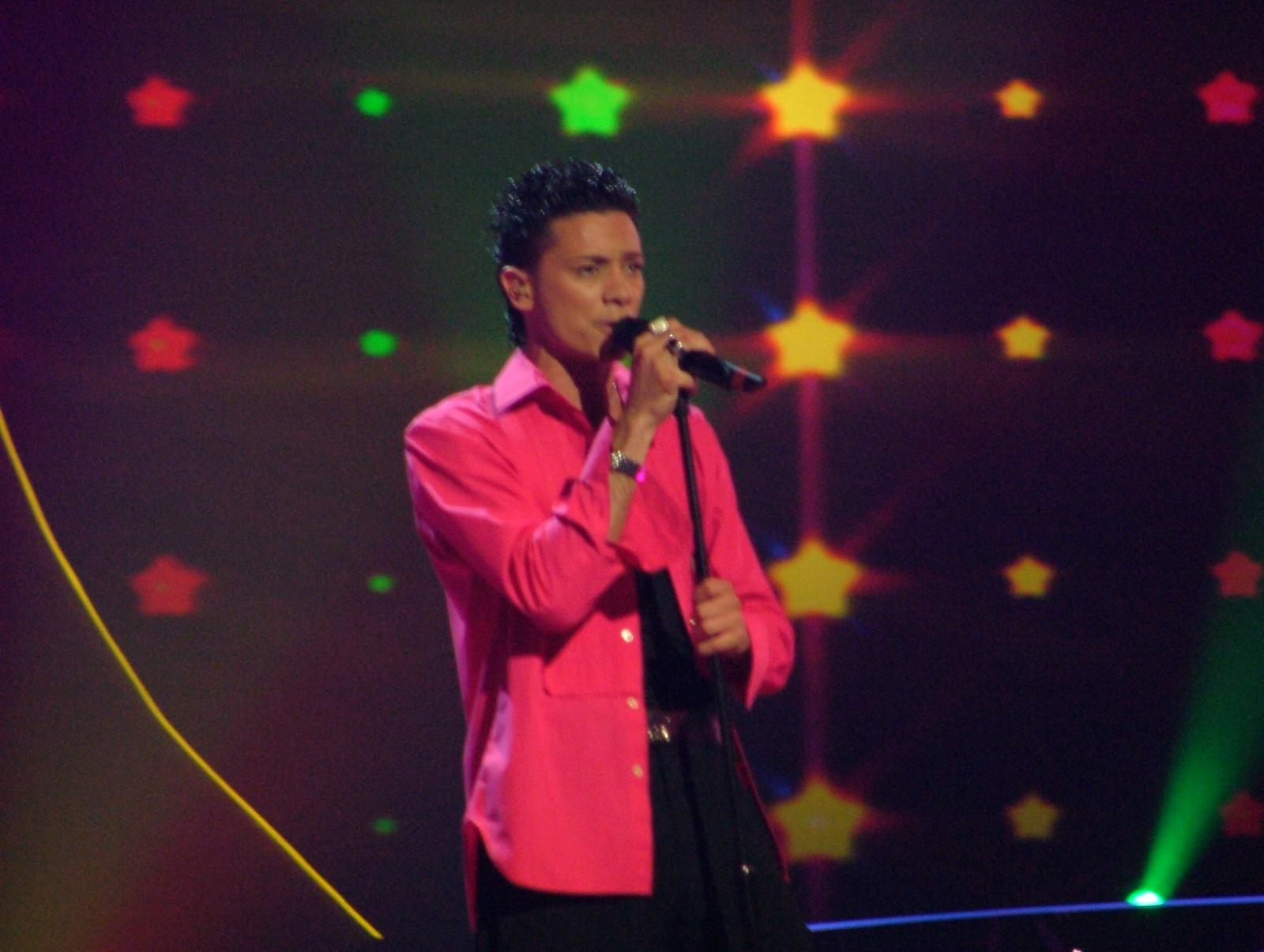
Piero and the MusicStars in Istanbul (2004)

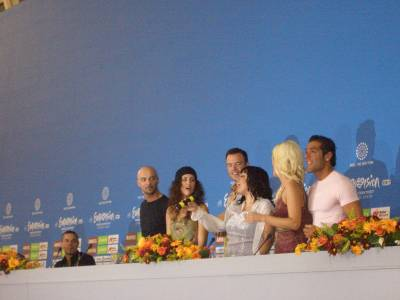
Six4one during a press conference in Athens (2006)

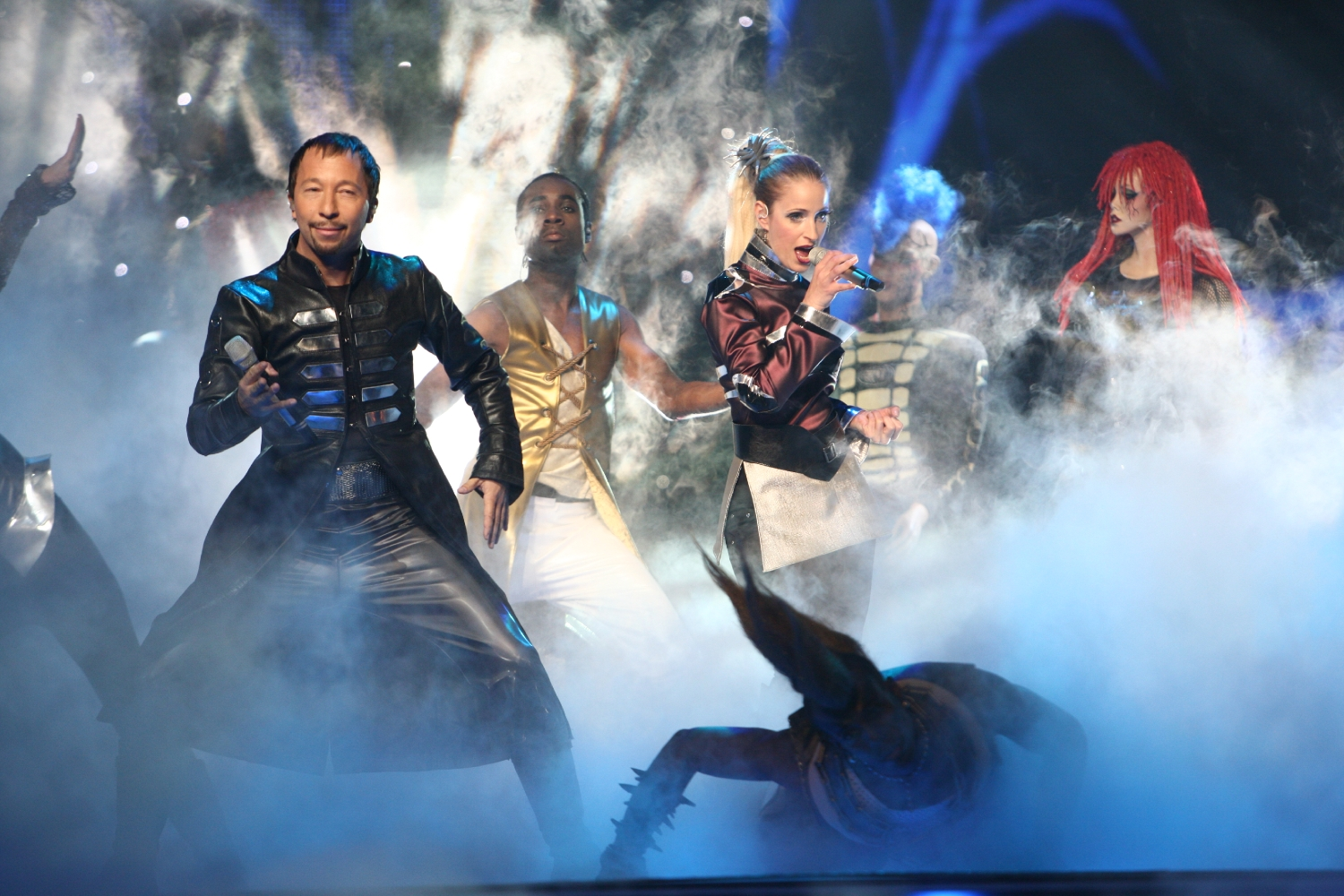
DJ BoBo in Helsinki (2007)

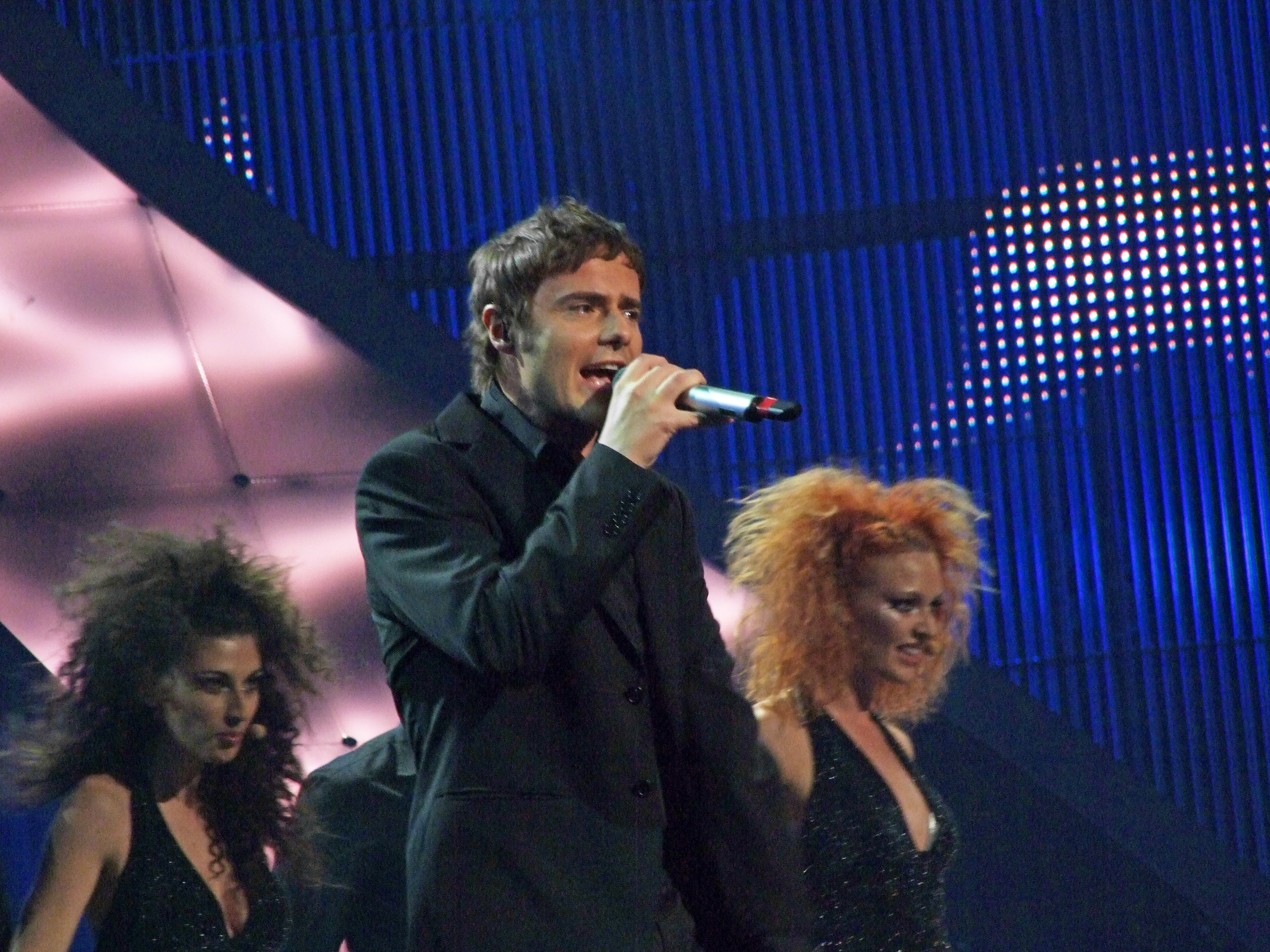
Paolo Meneguzzi in Belgrade (2008)

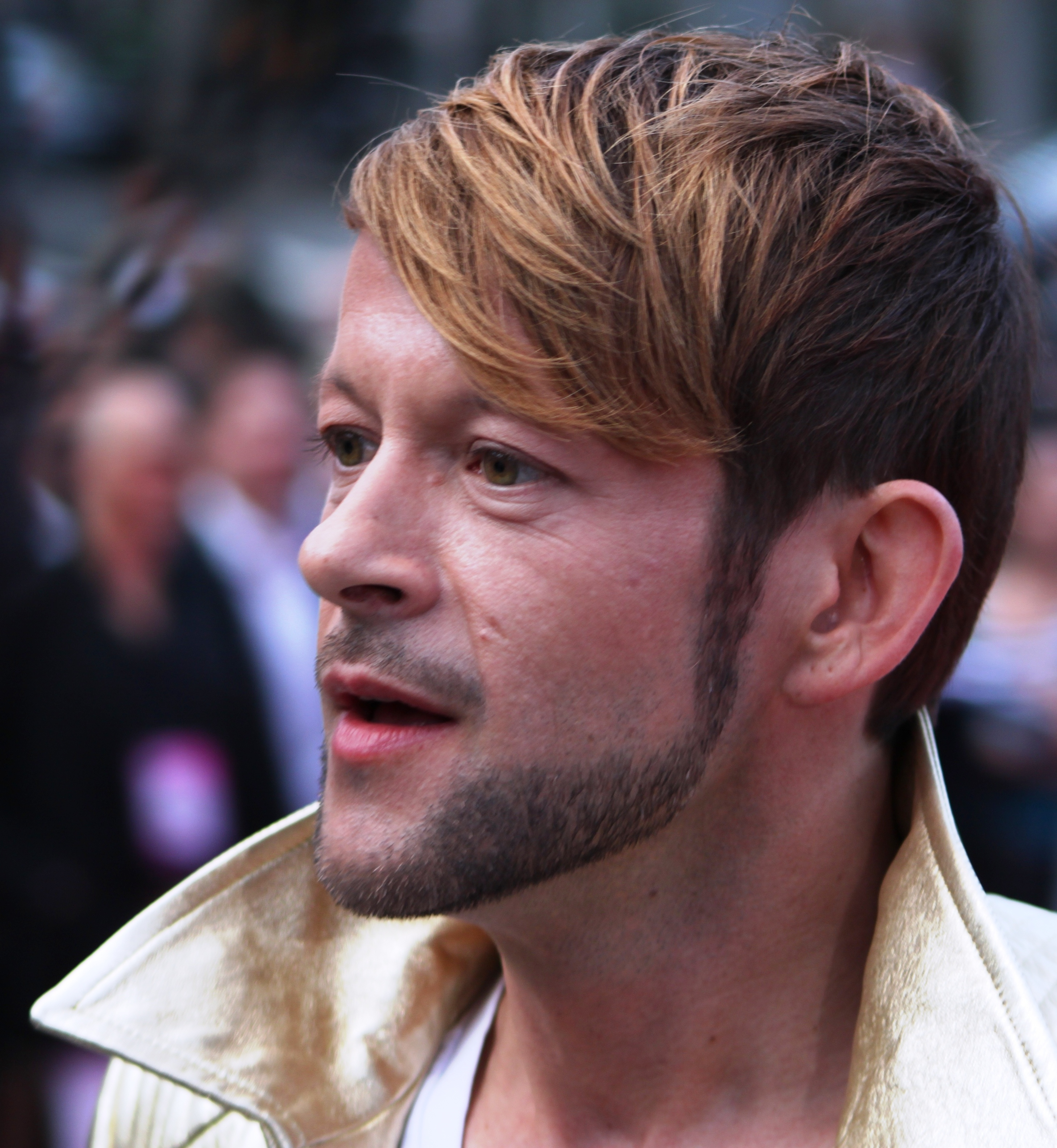
Michael von der Heide in Oslo (2010)

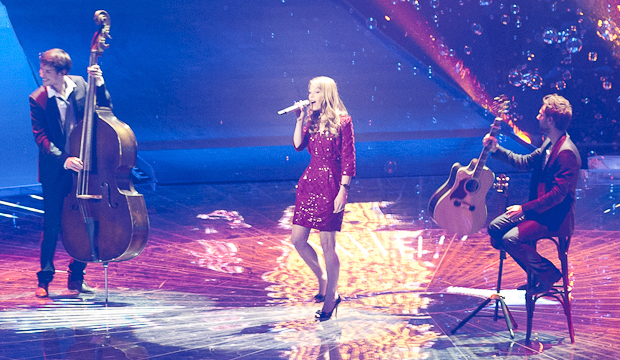
Anna Rossinelli in Düsseldorf (2011)

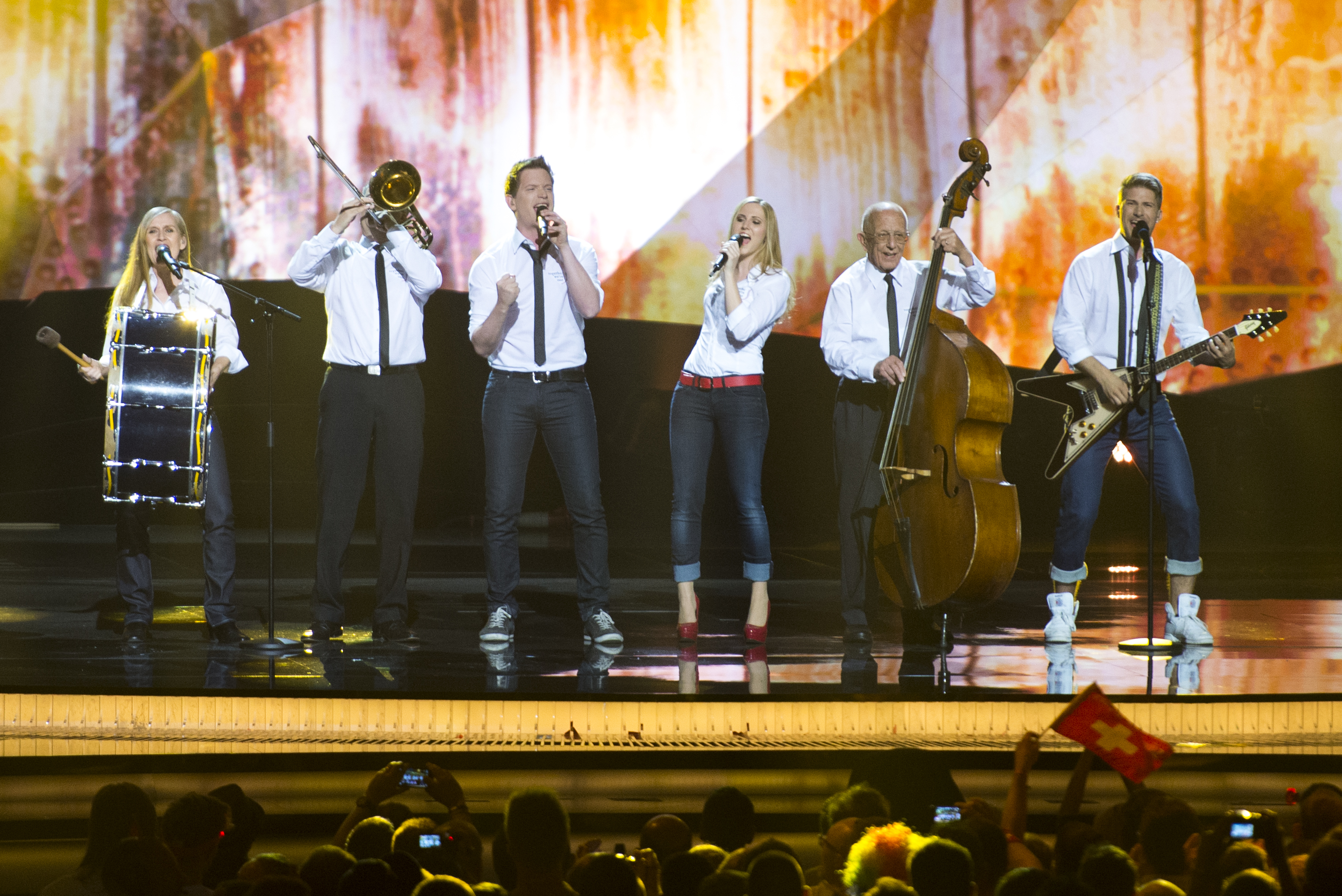
Takasa in Malmö (2013)

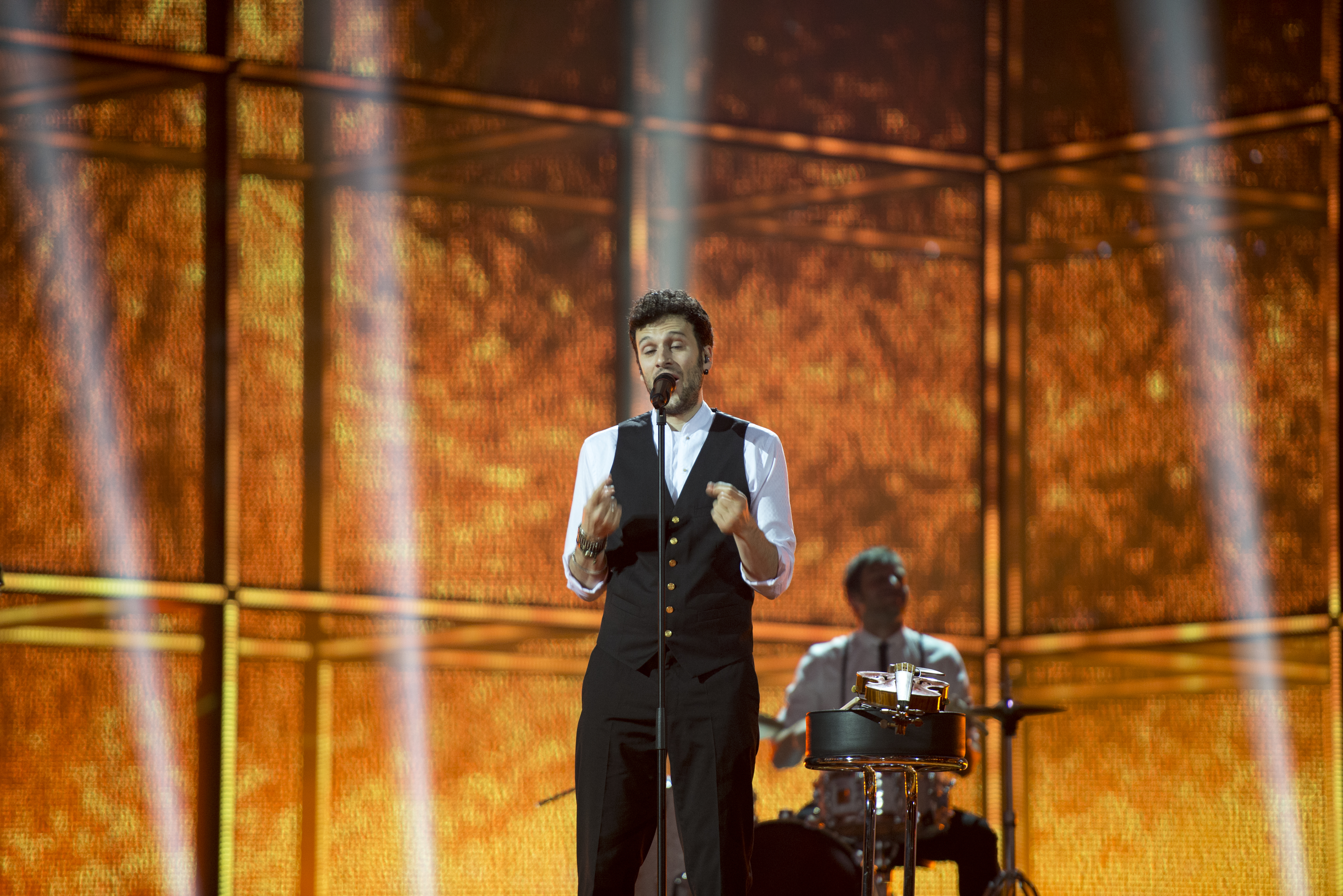
Sebalter in Copenhagen (2014)

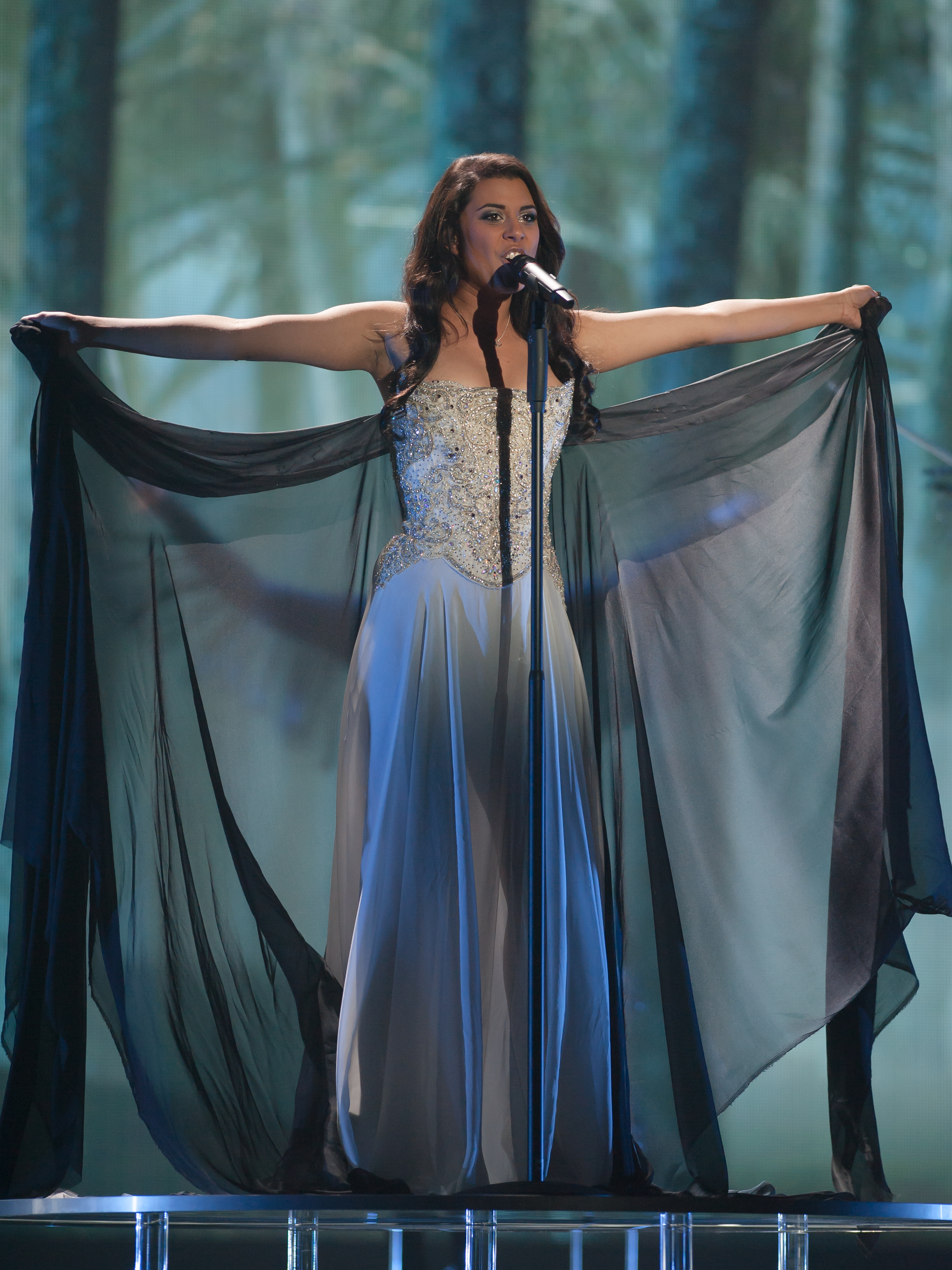
Mélanie René in Vienna (2015)

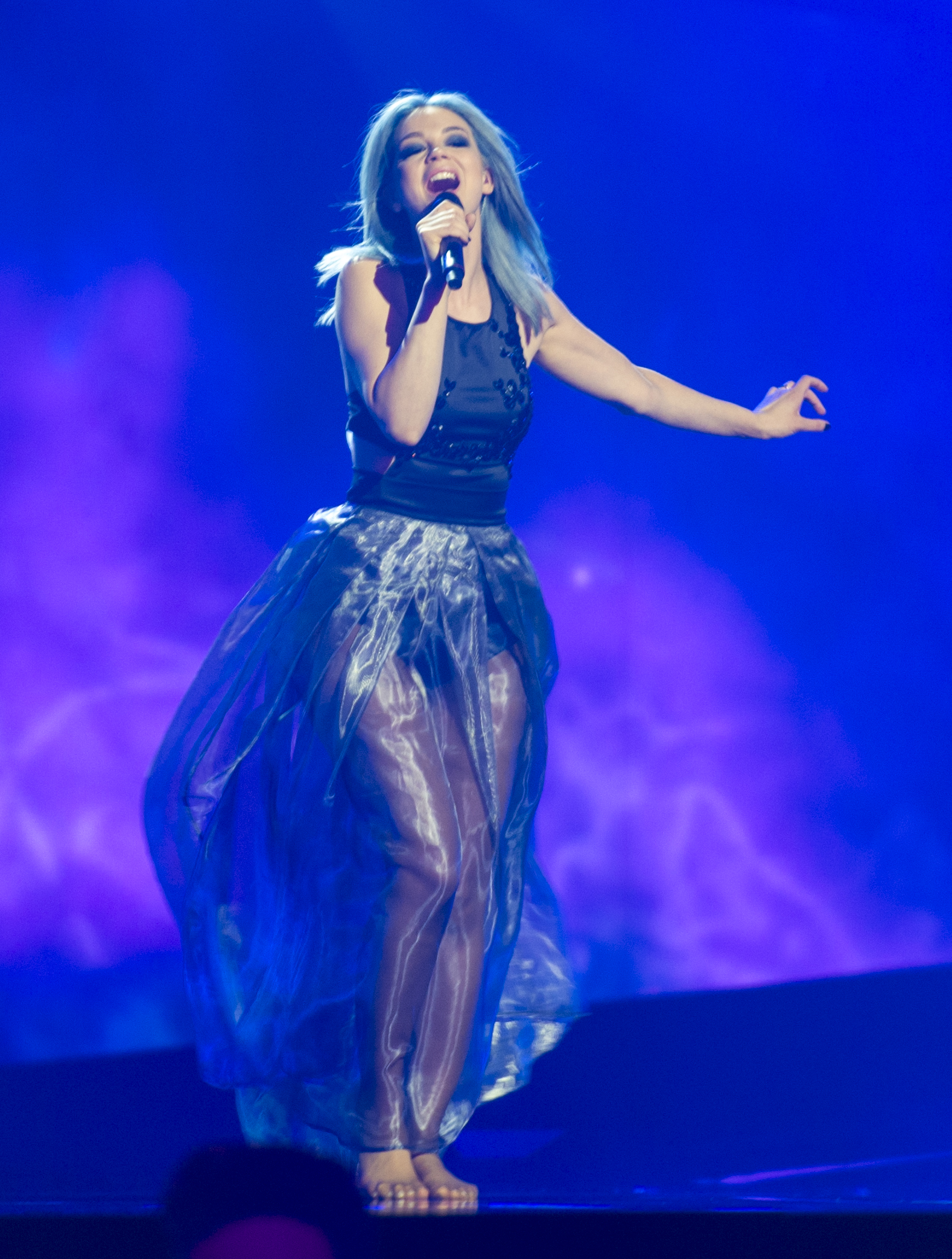
Rykka in Stockholm (2016)

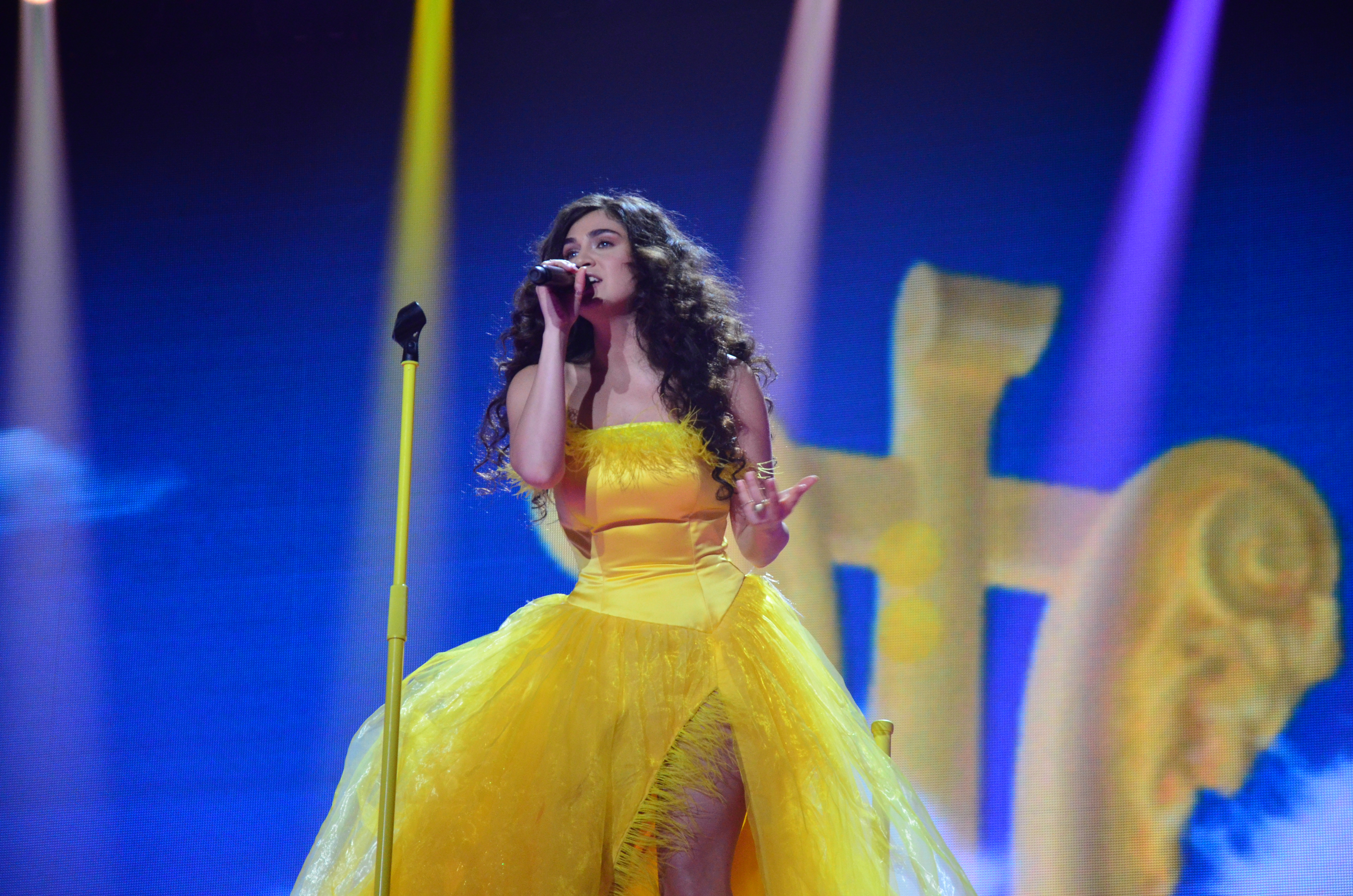
Timebelle in Kyiv (2017)

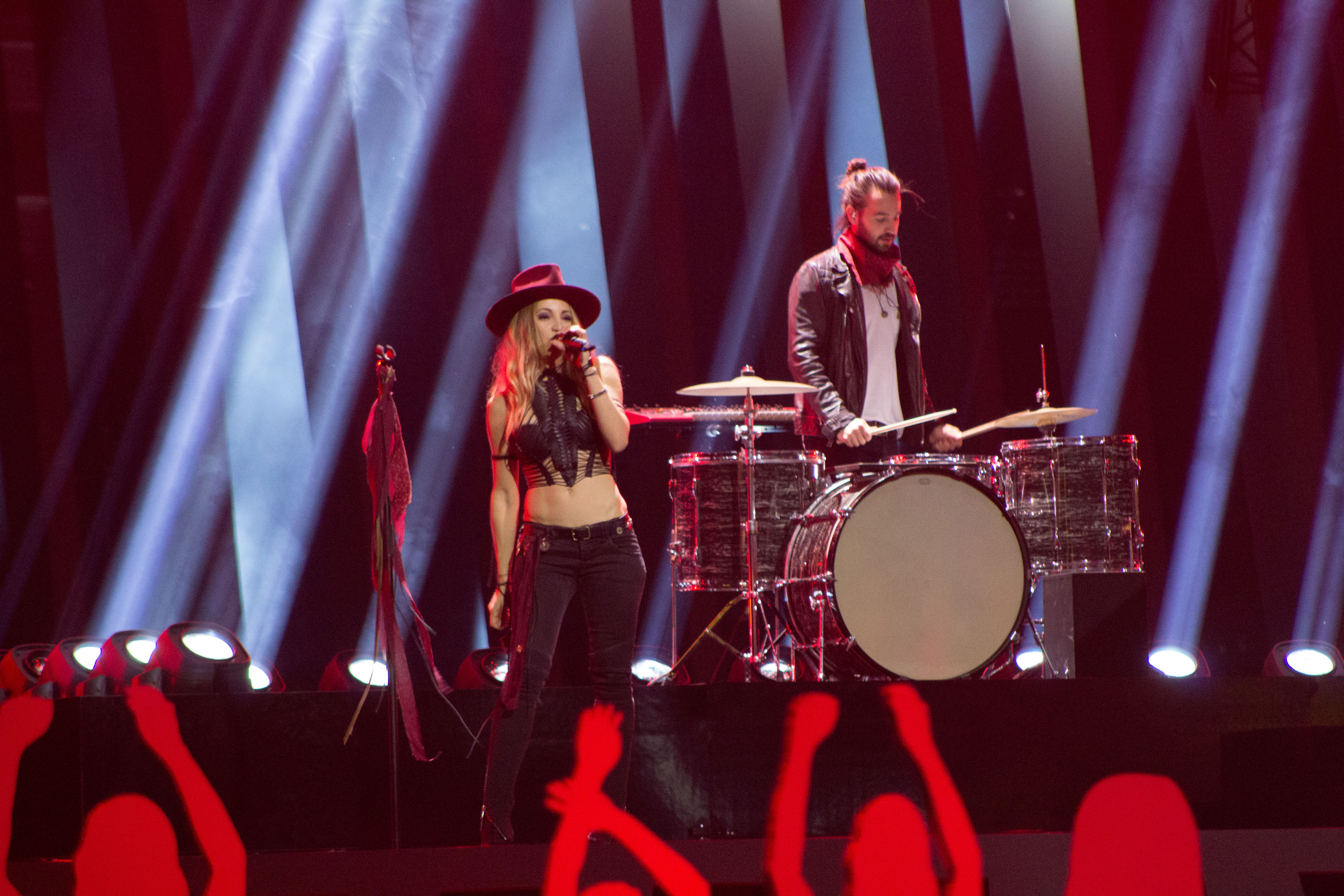
Zibbz in Lisbon (2018)

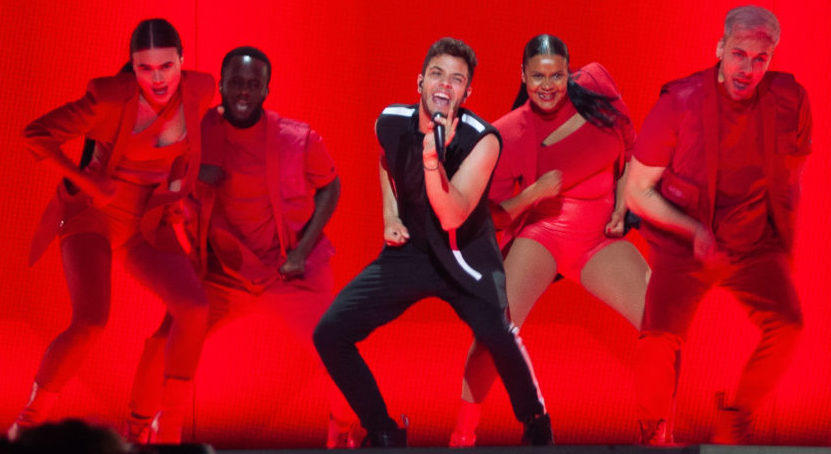
Luca Hänni in Tel Aviv (2019)

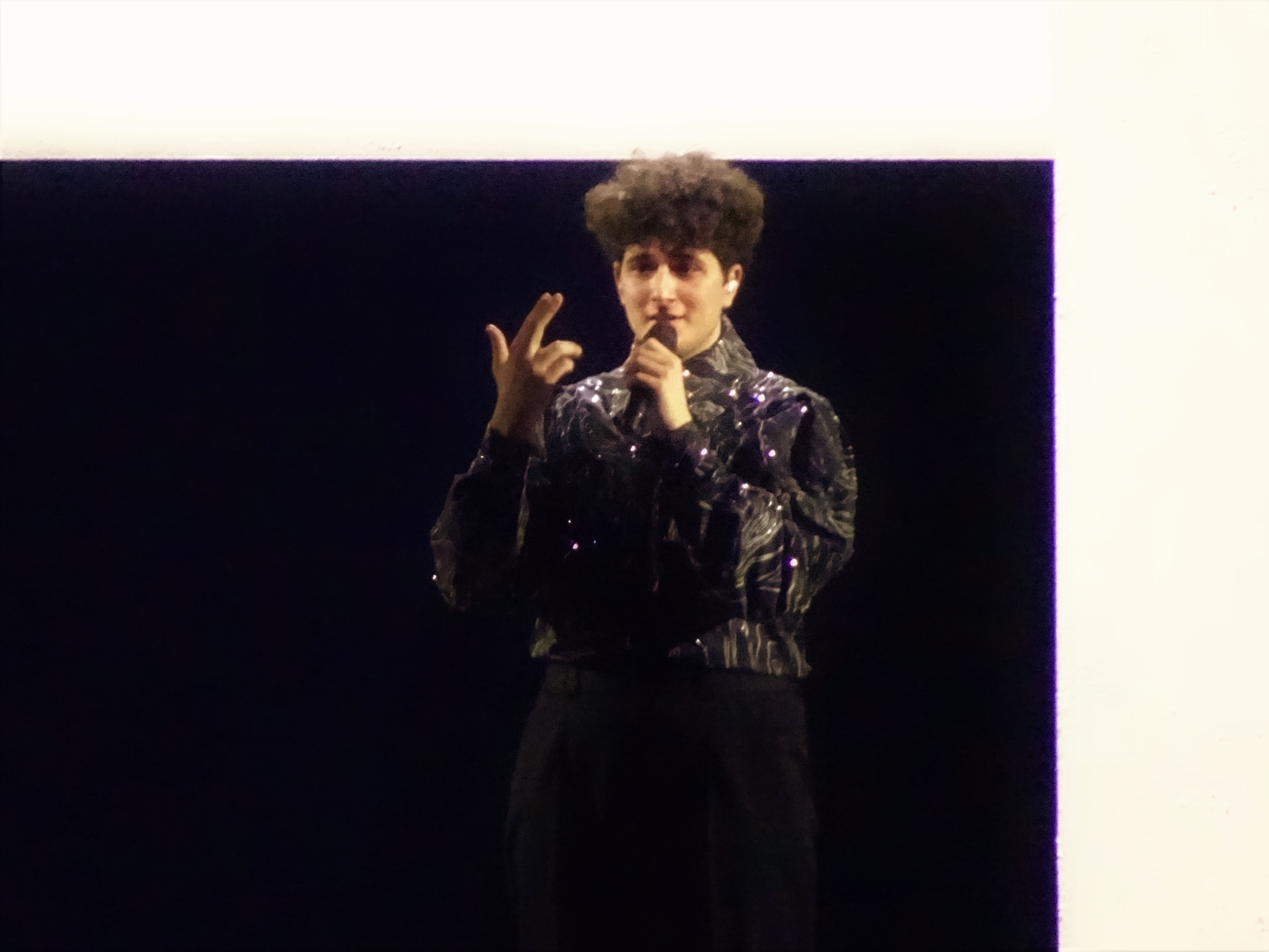
Gjon's Tears in Rotterdam (2021)

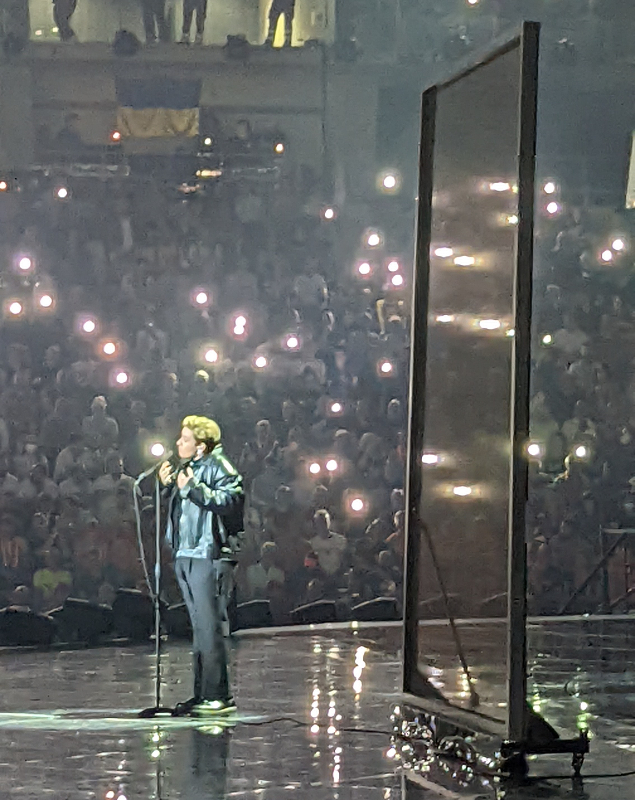
Marius Bear in Turin (2022)

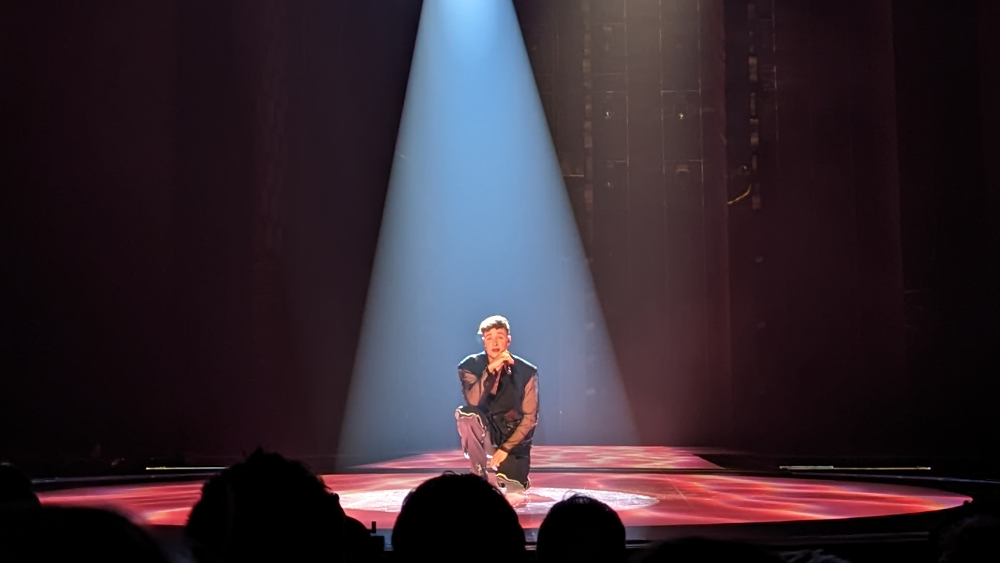
Remo Forrer in Liverpool (2023)

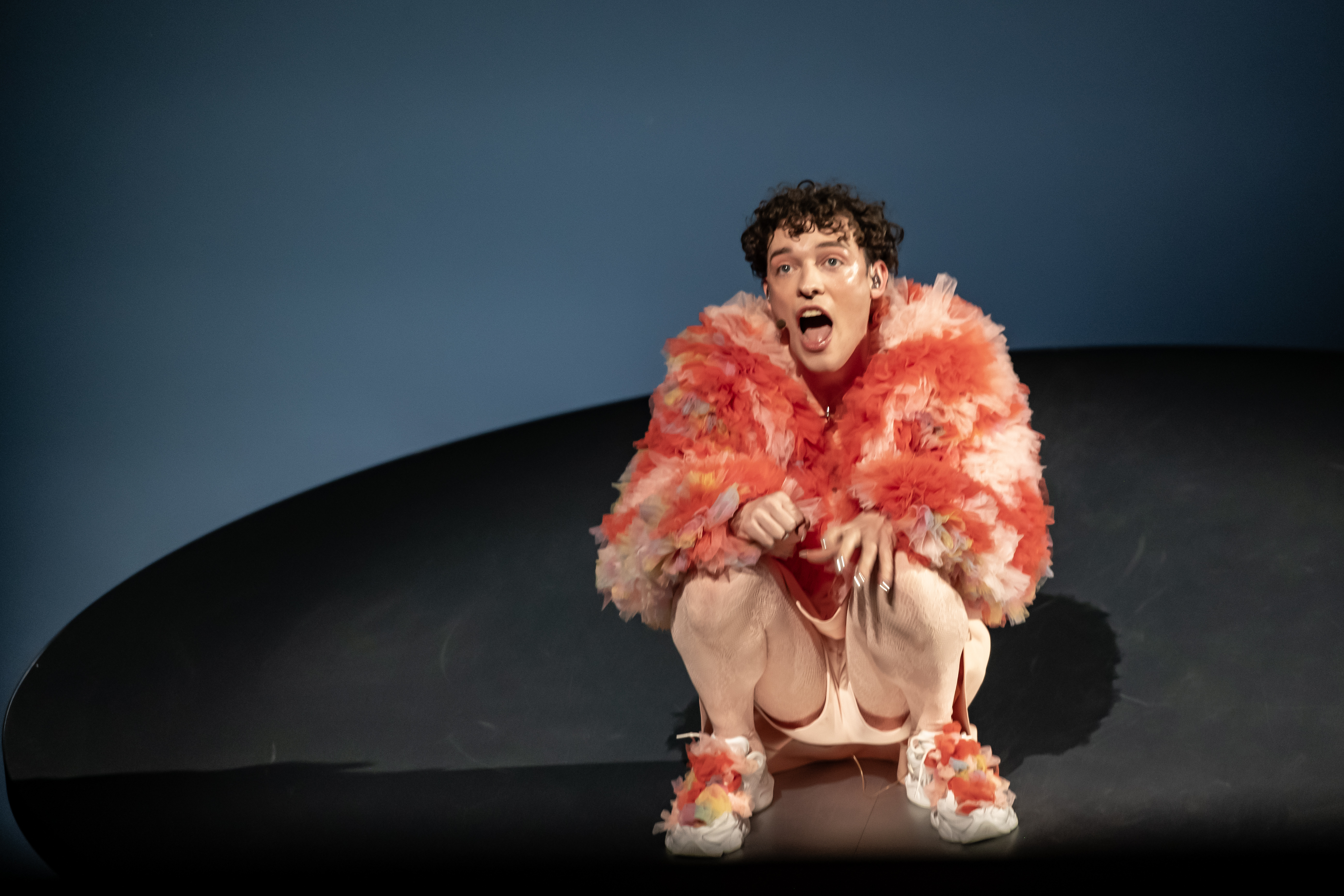
Nemo in Malmö (2024)

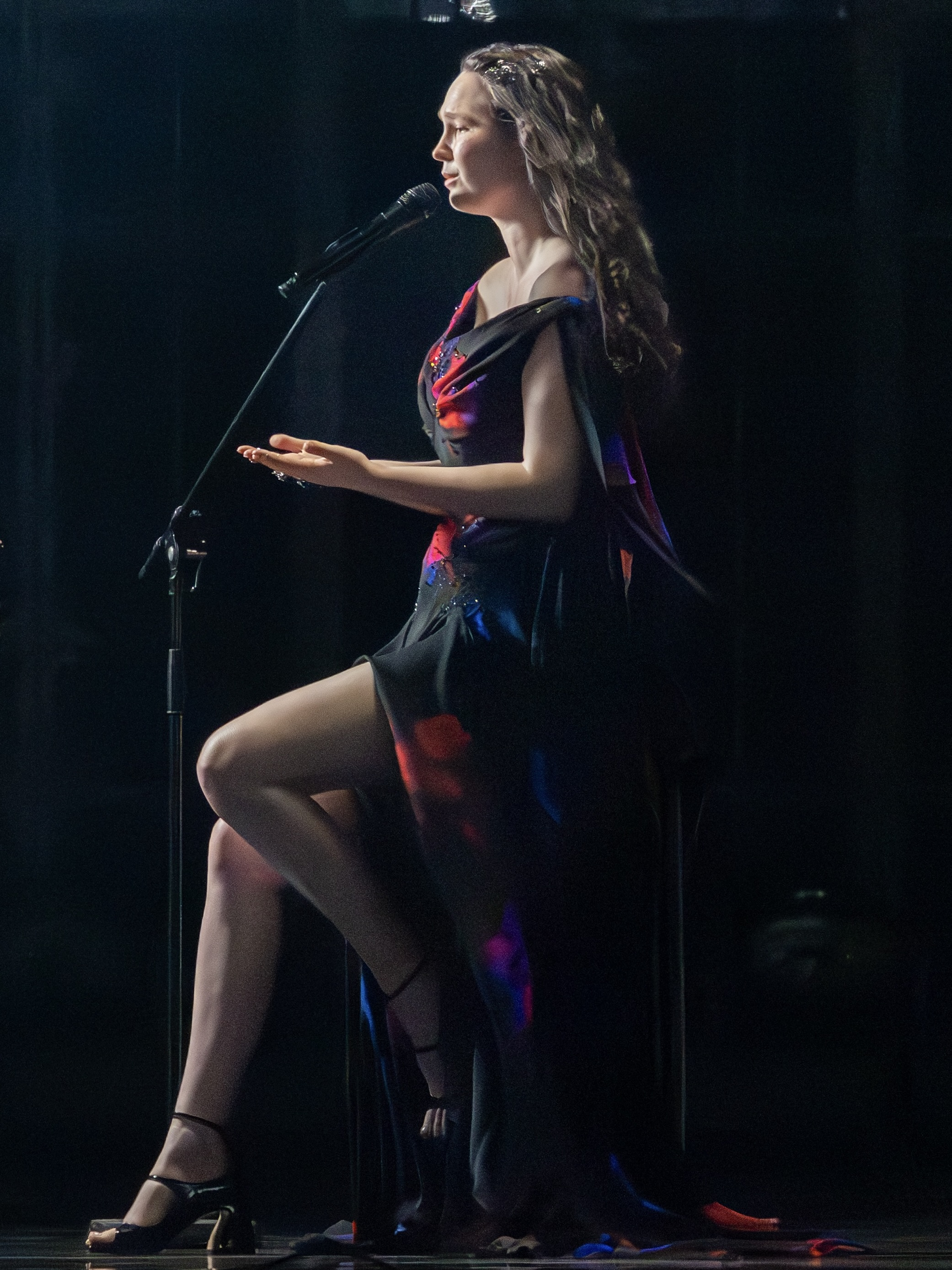
Zoë Më in Basel (2025)

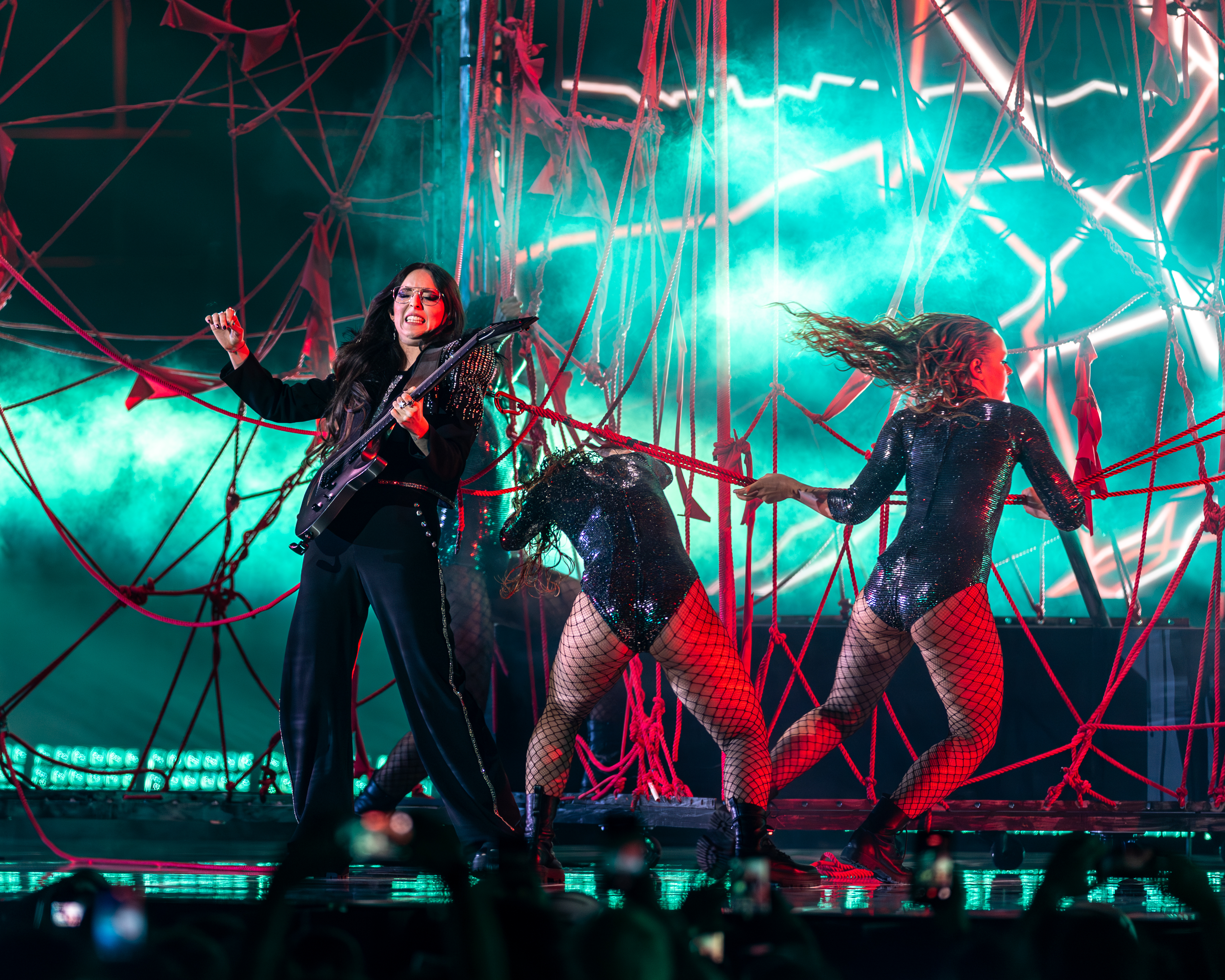
Veronica Fusaro in Vienna (2026)

== See also ==
- Switzerland in the Junior Eurovision Song Contest – Junior version of the Eurovision Song Contest.
