= Michael von der Heide =

Swiss musician, singer, and actor (born 1971)

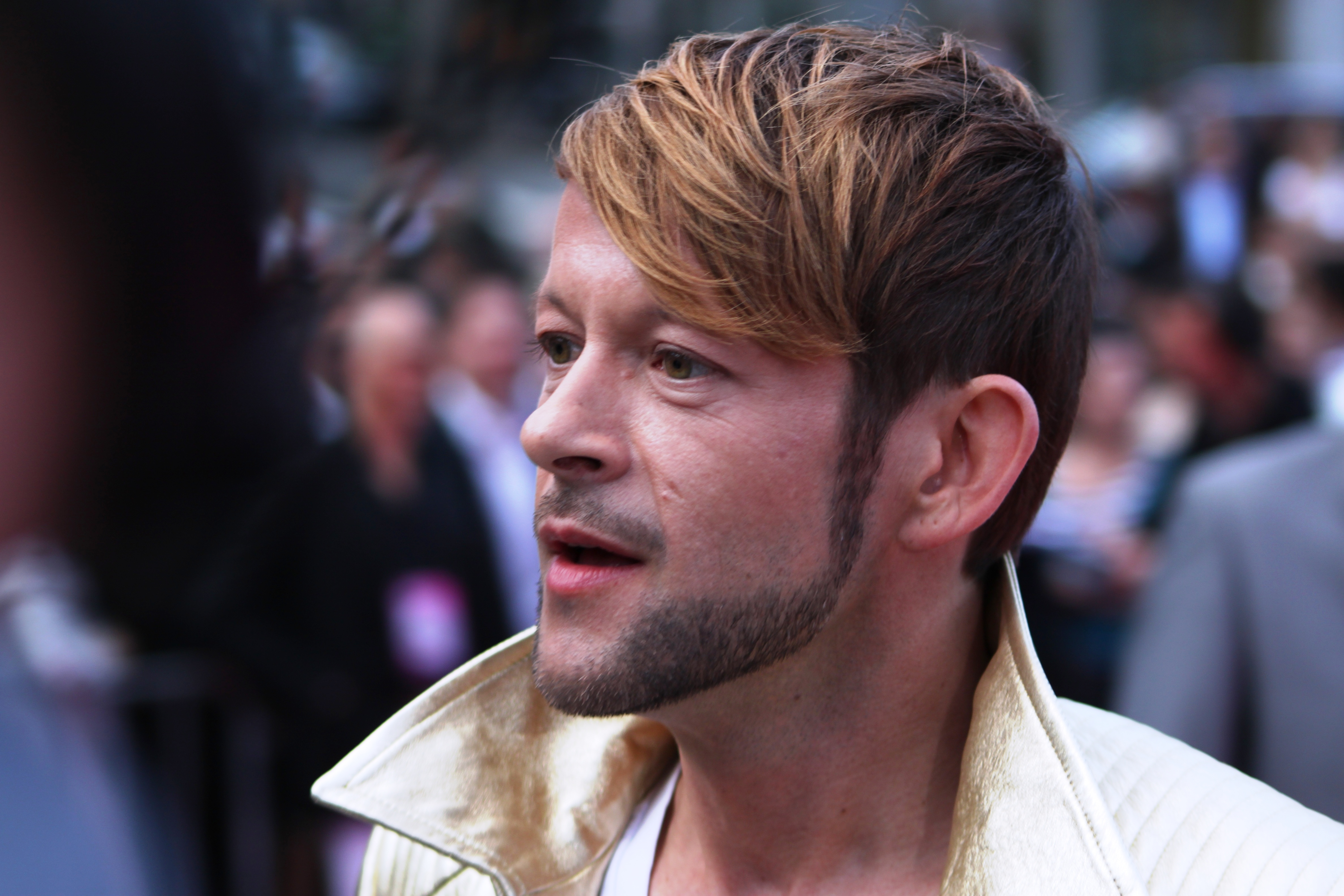

Background information
- Born: 16 October 1971 (age 54); Amden, Switzerland
- Occupation: Singer
- Years active: 1996-

Michael von der Heide (born 16 October 1971) is a Swiss musician, singer, and actor.

== Early life ==
Von der Heide was born the son of a German father and a Swiss mother.

== Eurovision Song Contest ==
=== Eurovision Song Contest 1999 ===
In 1999, Von der Heide participated in the German national final with the song "Bye Bye Bar", eventually finishing fifth, and did not go on to represent Germany in the Eurovision Song Contest 1999.

=== Eurovision Song Contest 2009 ===
Von der Heide played a small part as one of the Swiss jurors.

=== Eurovision Song Contest 2010 ===
On 18 December 2009, it was announced that Von der Heide will represent Switzerland in the Eurovision Song Contest 2010 with the song "Il pleut de l'or". He participated in the second semi-final but finished last in a field of 17 with 2 points and did not qualify to the final.

== Personal life ==
Von der Heide was awarded 5,000 francs by the Federal Court in 2010. The court determined that coverage of his musical career by the Zürich-based tabloid Blick had been homophobic. He has stated in interviews that he does not feel the need to discuss his personal life in public.

== Discography ==
=== Albums ===
Year	Title	Peak chart positions		
Year	Title	SWI	AUT	GER
1996	Michael von der Heide	−	−	−
1998	30°	18	−	−
2000	Tourist	5	−	−
2001	Hildegard	−	−	−
2002	Frisch	44	−	−
2003	Helvetia	−	−	−
2005	2pièces	72	−	−
2008	Freie Sicht	39	−	−
2011	Lido	25	−	−
2015	Bellevue	19	−	−
2016	Paola	22	−	−
2019	Rio Amden Amsterdam	24	−	−
2020	Echo	17	−	−
2021	Echo (Live)	−	−	−
2023	Nocturne	9	−	−
2024	Noël Noël	7	−	−
2025	Michael von der Heide singt Knef	45	−	−

=== Singles ===
- 1996 – "Erfolg"
- 1996 – "Mit dir leben"
- 1998 – "Jeudi amour"
- 1998 – "Bad Hair Days"
- 1998 – "Bye Bye Bar"
- 2000 – "Je suis seul"
- 2000 – "Where the Wild Roses Grow" – Duet with Kuno Lauener
- 2000 – "Paradies"
- 2002 – "Kriminaltango" – Duet with Nina Hagen
- 2003 – "La solitude"
- 2005 – "Paris c'est toi (toujours)"
- 2005 – "Ich bi wie du"
- 2006 – "Ruggewind"
- 2006 – "Elodie"
- 2008 – "Immer wenn du denkst" (Online single in Germany)
- 2008 – "Tout un été / Einen Sommer lang"
- 2009 – "Gib mir was von dir"
- 2010 – "Il pleut de l'or"
- 2011 – "J'ai perdu ma jeunesse"
- 2011 – "Reste"
- 2012 – "La nuit dehors"
- 2015 – "Pas vu le temps passer"
- 2015 – "Hinderem Berg"
- 2015 – "Rien que des amis" – Duet with Sina
- 2016 – "Paola et moi"
- 2016 – "Cinéma"
- 2016 – "Wo ist das Land" – Duet with Paola
- 2017 – "Solo por ti"
- 2019 – "Ce soir" – Duet with Daniela Simmons
- 2019 – "Tüüf underem Schnee"
- 2020 – "Abschied von der Nacht" – Duet with Heidi Happy
- 2021 – "SOS"
- 2021 – "Le paradis blanc"
- 2022 – "Mini Wiehnacht"
- 2023 – "Hole In My Heart" – Duet with Eve Gallagher
- 2023 – "Hole In My Heart – Juiceppe's Deep House Mix" – with Eve Gallagher & Juiceppe
- 2023 – "Träne im Wind"
- 2024 – "Liechtli"
- 2024 — “Jour de Neige”
- 2024 — “Schnee vo geschter”
- 2025 — “Blatt im Wind” Duet with Florian Ast

Awards and achievements
Preceded by Lovebugs with The Highest Heights	Switzerland in the Eurovision Song Contest; 2010	Succeeded by Anna Rossinelli with In Love for a While
