= Piera Martell =

Swiss singer (born 1943)

- Born: 2 July 1943 (age 82)
- Origin: Jona, Switzerland
- Genres: Pop, Schlager
- Occupation: Singer

Piera Martell (born 2 July 1943 in Jona, St. Gallen) is a Swiss singer. She represented Switzerland in the Eurovision Song Contest 1974.

In 1974, Martell took part in the Swiss Eurovision selection with the song "Mein Ruf nach dir" ("My Call to You"), which won the competition and went forward to the 19th Eurovision Song Contest, held on 6 April in Brighton, United Kingdom. In what is considered one of the strongest Eurovisions, won by ABBA and featuring already internationally known performers such as Olivia Newton-John, Gigliola Cinquetti, and Mouth & MacNeal, "Mein Ruf nach dir" picked up only three points, finishing in joint last place (with the songs from Germany, Norway, and Portugal) of the 17 entries.

Martell went on to make three further attempts to perform at Eurovision, without success. She entered the German selection in 1976 ("Ein neuer Tag" – 11th), followed by two more participations in the Swiss selection in 1977 ("Aldo Rinaldo" – 4th) and in 1978 ("Hier, Pierre" – 6th). She continued performing and releasing singles periodically until her retirement from the music industry in 1981.

Awards and achievements
Preceded by Patrick Juvet with "Je vais me marier, Marie"	Switzerland in the Eurovision Song Contest; 1974	Succeeded by Simone Drexel with "Mikado"
