= Yovanna =

Greek singer, novelist, and poet (born 1938)

Yovanna Ιωάννα Φάσσου Καλπαξή
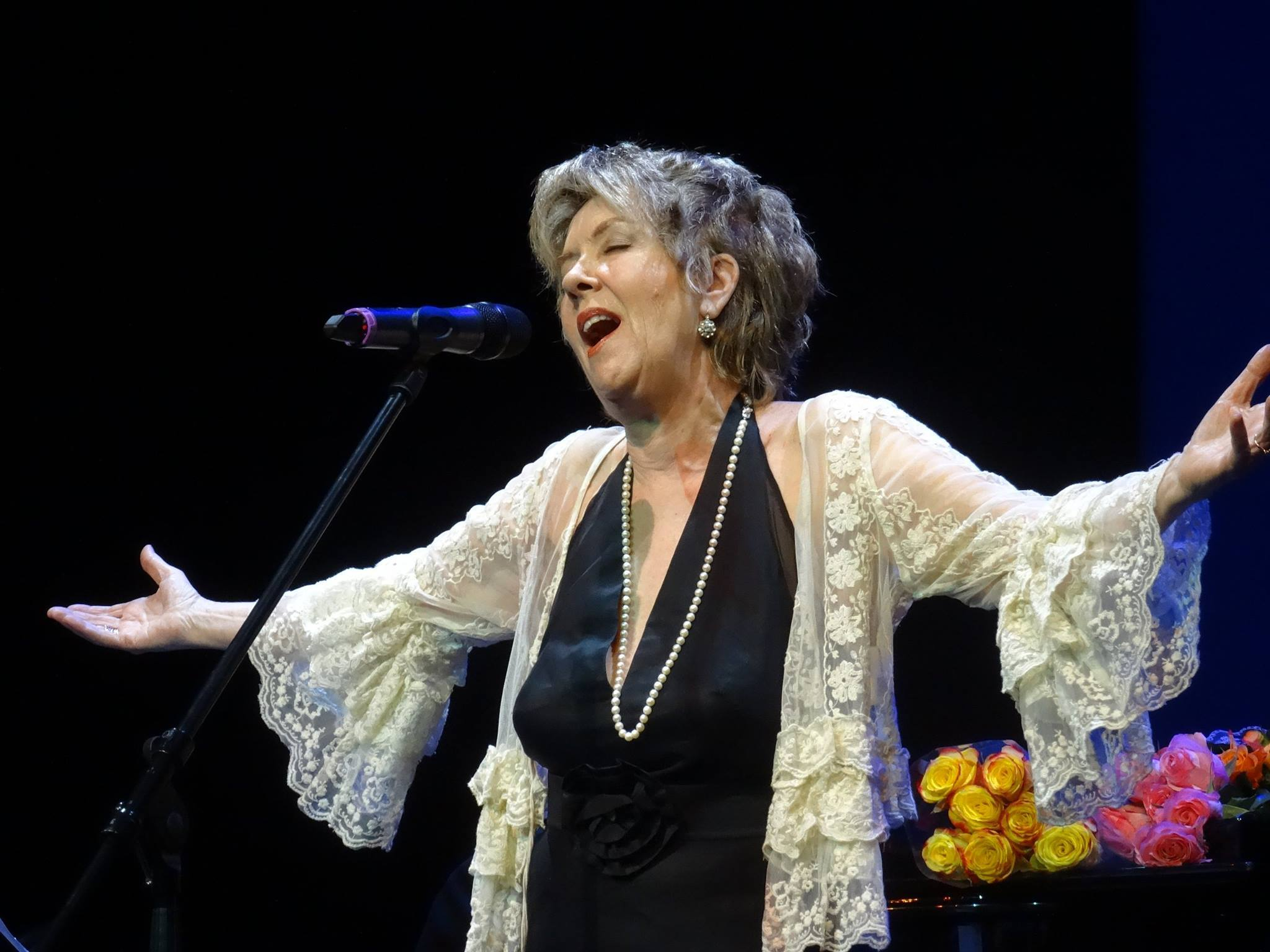
- Yovanna in Moscow in 2015

Background information
- Born: Ioanna Fassou Kalpaxi; 14 November 1938 (age 87)
- Origin: Amaliada, Greece
- Genre: Pop
- Occupations: Singer, novelist, poet
- Website: https://yovannakalpaxi.wixsite.com/official

Ioanna Fassou Kalpaxi (Greek: Ιωάννα Φάσσου Καλπαξή; born 14 November 1938), known professionally as Yovanna, is a Greek singer, novelist and poet known for her participation in the 1965 Eurovision Song Contest representing Switzerland.

== Early life and education ==
At the age of 14, she started her vocal studies at the Athens Conservatoire and trained as an opera singer, namely a lyric soprano. Concurrently, using the stage name "Yovanna", she was broadcasting on the National Radio with the Greek Radio Light Music Orchestra, thereby putting in jeopardy the scholarship that the Athens Conservatoire had awarded her, as this sort of activity was strictly forbidden. In a graduate contest with fifty contestants, and just one year before obtaining her diploma, she won the leading role of Margit in the operetta "Where the Lark Sings" by Franz Lehár. The following year, she took her degree with honours and was awarded a state scholarship to continue her studies in Rome at the Accademia Nazionale di Santa Cecilia. However, this never materialized as the scholarship was finally given to another applicant for some unspecified reason. It was then that Yovanna decided to move into popular music.

== Career ==
She started participating in Greek and international song festivals in the early 1960s and after receiving the first prize in the Sopot International Song Festival in Poland she launched her international career, becoming extremely popular in the Soviet Union and particularly the Republic of Georgia, giving hundreds of sold-out concerts at theatres and sports arenas and selling millions of records.

At about that time Yovanna began collaborating with the Radio of Geneva, Switzerland, and as its representative, she gave concerts named "Musique aux Champs-Élysées" at many concert halls all over Europe (France, Italy, Switzerland, Germany, Belgium).

In 1965, Yovanna took part in the Swiss Eurovision selection event with the song "Non, à jamais sans toi" and was chosen as the country's representative in the tenth Eurovision Song Contest, held in Naples on 20 March. Performed as the last song in the contest, "Non, à jamais sans toi" finished in eighth place of the 18 competing entries.

Yovanna continued recording and performing, mainly in Greece and Germany, until the early 1980s, when she made the decision to devote herself to writing. She initially wrote volumes of poetry, and in 1986 published her first novel "Άντε γεια" (pronounced: Ande yiá, translated as "Take care") which became a bestseller in Greece and was subsequently made into a successful film and a theatre play. Up to now she has published twelve novels, some of which have also been adapted for television, and five poetry collections.

In Georgia and Russia, Yovanna is still considered a living legend. In 2011, during a solemn ceremony at the Rustaveli National Theatre the Mayor of Tbilisi bestowed honorary citizenship on Yovanna. In 2017, the Georgian Ambassador in Greece awarded Yovanna with a state certificate of appreciation in recognition of her extraordinary contribution to strengthening historical ties between Georgian and Greek Peoples. In 2015, Yovanna returned to Moscow after 30 years of absence and participated in a concert at the Moscow International House of Music performing to a full house of enthusiastic audience.

Awards and achievements
Preceded by Anita Traversi with "I miei pensieri"	Switzerland in the Eurovision Song Contest; 1965	Succeeded by Madeleine Pascal with "Ne vois-tu pas ?"
