= Anita Traversi =

- Born: 25 July 1937
- Origin: Giubiasco, Switzerland
- Died: 25 September 1991 (aged 54)
- Genres: Pop
- Occupation: Singer

Anita Traversi (25 July 1937 – 25 September 1991) was a Swiss singer, best known for her participation in the Eurovision Song Contests of 1960 and 1964.

== Early career ==
Born in Giubiasco, Traversi was encouraged by her father, a musician, and started singing with an orchestra in the mid-1950s, including with the orchestra of the Italian language Swiss radio channel. In 1956, she took part in the Swiss selection for the first Eurovision Song Contest, but "Bandanelle Ticinese" was not chosen. The same year she was a member of the Quintetta Radiosa, who sung the backing vocals for both of Lys Assia's entries, including the winner "Refrain". In 1959, Traversi obtained a recording contract in Italy, and went on to record a number of songs with Adriano Celentano, including the top 10 hit "Piccola". Anita Traversi represented Switzerland at several Song Festivals in the world with great success, as the Sopot International Song Festival (Poland), Rio de Janeiro (Brazil), "Golden Orpheus" (Bulgaria). She appeared to the Song Festival in Sopot twice, first in 1962 with a song "Una certa sera" (A.Scotti) and with a Polish song "Jesienna rozłąka" ("Dis-moi, dis-moi") (Gert-Brok). She was awarded with the First Prize for best performance. In 1968, she was in Sopot for the second time singing for Switzerland. In "Polish Day" she performed a Polish song "Odra rzeka" ("Odra") (Pałasz-Fiszer) and this time she was placed second after Annarita Spinaci (Italy). During the festival she performed a fantastic song "Balalaika" which was one of the favourites of that festival. In 1970 she was one of the big stars at "Golden Orpheus" in Bulgaria with a great performance of the Bulgarian song "Edna bylgarska roza" ("One Bulgarian rose"). And in Rio de Janeiro she was among the rewarded singers too.

== Eurovision Song Contest ==
In 1960, Traversi's second attempt at Eurovision was successful when her song "Cielo e terra" ("Heaven and Earth") was chosen as the Swiss entry for the fifth Eurovision Song Contest, which took place in London on 29 March. A dramatic orchestral ballad, very typical of early Eurovision, "Cielo e terra" finished in eighth place of 13 entries.

Traversi tried again to represent Switzerland in Eurovision in 1961 ("Finalmente") and 1963 (with three songs, including her first attempt in the German language), but did not make it in either year. She finally got her second chance in 1964, with "I miei pensieri" ("My Thoughts") being selected to go forward to the ninth Eurovision, held on 21 March in Copenhagen. However, this ballad did not find favour, being one of four songs to finish tied last at the bottom of the scoreboard, having failed to receive points.

== Later career ==
From the mid-1960s, Traversi's career foundered as her recordings met with little success. In 1967 she featured again, unsuccessfully, in the Swiss Eurovision heat. By the early 1970s she had effectively retired from showbusiness to devote herself to family life. She did however make one final appearance, with two songs, in the Swiss Eurovision selection of 1976, once more without success.

== Death ==
Traversi died of undisclosed causes in Bellinzona on 25 September 1991, aged 54.

Preceded by Christa Williams with "Irgendwoher"	Switzerland in the Eurovision Song Contest; 1960	Succeeded by Franca Di Rienzo with "Nous aurons demain"
Preceded by Esther Ofarim with "T'en va pas"	Switzerland in the Eurovision Song Contest; 1964	Succeeded by Yovanna with "Non, à jamais sans toi"
