= Madeleine Pascal =

1960s French singer

- Born: 1946 (age 79–80); Paris, France
- Occupation: Singer
- Years active: 1965-1966
- Notable work: Ne vois-tu pas?

Madeleine Pascal (born 1946) is a French singer who represented Swizerland at the Eurovision Song Contest 1966.

== Career ==
Madeleine Pascal begins by learning the guitar, then sings at the age of 13 years. In 1965, she performed the song La Vérité by Jacques Datin and Jacques Pezet.

From 1965 to 1966, she published several singles with Polydor and CBS Records such as La vérité, Oh quelle chance on a, François, and Que chantait grand’mère..

== Eurovision Song Contest ==
In 1966, Madeleine Pascal represented Switzerland at the Eurovision Song Contest 1966 with song Ne vois-tu pas?, composed by Pierre Brenner and written by Roland Schweizer. It is a mixture between waltz and fashion pop that insists on the theme of a young woman whom her beloved sees as a girl.

Her performance, the most yé-yé of the evening, reached sixth position with 12 points, 5 from Austria, 3 from Monaco and Ireland and 1 from Luxembourg. Jean Roderes conducted the orchestra for the third time at the gala, after doing so with Belgian and Luxembourg tickets. The festival was the end of her short-lived musical career.

== Discography ==
- La vérité; Oh quelle chance on a/Sur ce quai; Tout paraît possible (45 T Polydor 27.186)
- Qui m'aurait dit ça?; Ma chanson d'amour/Le ballet des essuie-glaces; Avec ses yeux (45 T Polydor 27.208)
- Ne vois-tu pas?; François/Aux amoureux du monde; Le jour où il va m'embrasser (45 T CBS EP 5670)
- J'ai choisi la liberté; Dieu n'est pas vieux/ J'aime les oignons; Que chantait grand'mère (45 T CBS EP 5743)

Preceded by Yovanna with "Non, à jamais sans toi"	Switzerland in the Eurovision Song Contest; 1966	Succeeded by Géraldine with "Quel cœur vas-tu briser?"
