= Switzerland in the Eurovision Song Contest 1974 =

- Eurovision Song Contest 1974
- Participating broadcaster: Swiss Broadcasting Corporation (SRG SSR)
- Country: Switzerland
- Selection process: Concours Eurovision de la Chanson 1974
- Selection date: 11 February 1974

Competing entry
- Song: "Mein Ruf nach dir"
- Artist: Piera Martell
- Songwriter: Pepe Ederer

Placement
- Final result: 14th, 3 votes

Participation chronology

Switzerland was represented at the Eurovision Song Contest 1974 with the song "Mein Ruf nach dir", written by Pepe Ederer, and performed by Piera Martell. The Swiss participating broadcaster, the Swiss Broadcasting Corporation (SRG SSR), selected its entry for the contest through a national final.

== Before Eurovision ==
=== Concours Eurovision de la Chanson 1974 ===
The Swiss Broadcasting Corporation (SRG SSR) held a national final to select its entry for the Eurovision Song Contest 1974. The broadcaster received 68 total song submissions (four of which were invalid), and ultimately selected eight to take part in the selection, with three being performed in French and German, and two in Italian. Among the participants were Peter, Sue & Marc— who represented Switzerland in 1971, and would repeat this in 1976, 1979, and 1981.

Swiss German and Romansh broadcaster Schweizer Fernsehen der deutschen und rätoromanischen Schweiz (SF DRS) staged the national final on 24 January 1974 at 21:00 CET in Zürich. It was presented by Liselotte Pulver and Guido Baumann, with Hans Moeckel conducting the orchestra.

Participating entries
Broadcaster	Artist(s)	Song	Songwriter(s)		Language
Broadcaster	Artist(s)	Song	Composer	Lyricist	Language
TSR	Pierre Bardin	"Je veux vivre"	Beat Graf	Michel Neuville	French
TSR	Françoise Rime	"On se dira toujours 'je t'aime'"	Pierre Alain		French
TSR	Tatjana	"La vague de la mer"	Eugène Tiel	François Heller	French
TSI	Marisa Frigerio	"È l'amore"	Marisa Frigerio		Italian
TSI	Gil & Leonia	"A Tucicabu"	Mario Robbiani		Italian
DRS	Peter, Sue & Marc	"Frei"	Peter Reber		German
DRS	Linda	"Ein Wort von dir, ein Wort von mir"	Arthur Paul Huber		German
DRS	Piera Martell	"Mein Ruf nach dir"	Pepe Ederer		German

The voting consisted of regional public votes which were sent as postcards to the three divisions of SRG SSR (DRS, TSR, TSI: German, French and Italian speaking, respectively), a press jury, and an "expert" jury. The votes were delivered in rankings, rather than points. The postcards from the public vote were required to be handwritten, and 800 postcards were declared invalid due to being typewritten. Overall, an estimate of 30,000 votes from the public were accepted.

The results and winner were announced live on television on 11 February by Liselotte Pulver and Michel Stocker, head of SRG SSR. The winner was the song "Mein Ruf nach dir" performed by Piera Martell, written by Pepe Ederer.

Final — 24 January 1974
R/O	Artist(s)	Song	Regional Juries			Press Jury	Expert Jury	Total	Place
R/O	Artist(s)	Song	DRS	TSR	TSI	Press Jury	Expert Jury	Total	Place
1	Pierre Bardin	"Je veux vivre"	4	2	7	2	5	20	4
2	Marisa Frigerio	"È l'amore"	8	8	2	6	7	31	7
3	Peter, Sue & Marc	"Frei"	2	4	4	1	2	13	2
4	Françoise Rime	"On se dira toujours 'je t'aime'"	5	1	6	4	8	24	5
5	Gil & Leonia	"A Tucicabu"	3	6	1	6	3	19	3
6	Linda	"Ein Wort von dir, ein Wort von mir"	7	7	8	8	4	34	8
7	Tatjana	"La vague de la mer"	6	5	5	4	6	26	6
8	Piera Martell	"Mein Ruf nach dir"	1	3	3	2	1	10	1

=== Releases ===
Piera Martell recorded and released "Mein Ruf nach dir" in a titular single in 1974. She would also release the song in English as "My Ship of Love" and French as "Il Faut Partir" that same year. In 1998, the song was featured in a CD compilation titled "Concours Eurovision De La Chanson 1956-1998: Schweizer Beiträge", which compiled every Swiss Eurovision entry at the time.

All of the other songs from the selection were also commercially released, with the majority being released in 1974. Additionally, Gil & Leonia released "A Tucicabu" in English as "Holiday in Tucicabu". Marisa Frigerio would later release "È l'amore" in 1975 on the B-side of a single featuring and titled after her 1975 Swiss selection song.

== At Eurovision ==
At the Eurovision Song Contest 1974, held at The Dome in Brighton, the Swiss entry was the eighth entry of the night following Germany and preceding Portugal. The Swiss conductor at the contest was Pepe Ederer, the composer of the song. At the close of voting, Switzerland had received three votes in total; finishing in joint fourteenth (last) place out of seventeen countries.

The contest was broadcast on SRG SSR via TV DRS (with commentary from Theodor Haller) and DRS 1 (Note: Delayed broadcast on 9 April 1974 at 21:30 (CET)) (with commentary from Max Rüeger) in German-speaking Switzerland, TSR (with commentary from Georges Hardy) and RSR 1 (with commentary from Robert Burnier) in Romandy, and TSI and Radio Monte Ceneri in Ticino.

=== Voting ===
Each participating broadcaster assembled a ten-member jury panel. Every jury member could give one point to their favourite song. This would be the last time this voting system was used, as the 12, 10, 8-1 voting system would be introduced the following year.

Points awarded to Switzerland
Score	Country
1 point	Belgium; Germany; United Kingdom

Points awarded by Switzerland
Score	Country
5 points	Sweden
2 points	Portugal
1 point	Germany
