= Gino (singer) =

Gino Cudsi credited as "Gino" or "Georgino Cudsi" [1940 - 1992] was a Greek (mother's side) and Syrian (father's side) singer who had a string of successful singles in Greece, the UK, Italy, Spain, and Germany during the 1960s. Contestant at Sanremo Song Festival 1966 (singing "Dipendesse Da Me")

== Discography ==
Singles

- "Proesthanome"
- "Orfanos"
- "Et maintenant"
- "The Secret / Big Wide World" 1963
- "Il Primo Bacio / Signora Simpatica" 1964
- "Ma cosa sai/Dipendesse da me" 1966
- "Missirlù", rebetiko song sung in Italian [as "Gino e Dorine", Ricordi Rec.] 1967
- "Neanderthal Man, [as Gino & Lucille] 1970
- "Χτύπησαν Εννιά (Sono Gia Le Tre) / Σε Φωνάζω Να Γυρίσης (Senza Amore)" 1970
- "Montego Bay / Yellow River" 1970
- "Luiza Luiza / Sing My Heart Sing" 1970
- "We'll Make It Someday / I'm A Boy In Love" 1971
- "Give A Hand / You Are My Everything" 1972
- "Let's Try Once Again (Se Mi Lasci) / Light My Fire (Ma Tu)" 1976 [as Gino and Lucille]
