= Switzerland in the Eurovision Song Contest 1965 =

- Eurovision Song Contest 1965
- Participating broadcaster: Swiss Broadcasting Corporation (SRG SSR)
- Country: Switzerland
- Selection process: Gran Premio Eurovisione della canzone
- Selection date: 6 February 1965

Competing entry
- Song: "Non, à jamais sans toi"
- Artist: Yovanna
- Songwriters: Bob Calfati; Jean Charles

Placement
- Final result: 8th, 8 points

Participation chronology

Switzerland was represented at the Eurovision Song Contest 1965 with the song "Non, à jamais sans toi", composed by Bob Calfati, with lyrics by Jean Charles, and performed by Greek singer Yovanna. The Swiss participating broadcaster, the Swiss Broadcasting Corporation (SRG SSR), selected its entry through a national final.

== Before Eurovision ==
=== Gran Premio Eurovisione della canzone ===
The Swiss Broadcasting Corporation (SRG SSR) held a national final to select its entry for the Eurovision Song Contest 1965. Six songs took part in the selection, with two songs being performed each in French, German, and Italian. Five artists took part to represent Switzerland, among whom was Carmela Corren who had represented Austria in 1963. Audrey was supposed to perform the song "Douce", but withdrew last minute due to falling ill with appendicitis. She was replaced by Marianne Gesseney.

Competing entries
Broadcaster	Artist	Song	Songwriter(s)		Language
Broadcaster	Artist	Song	Composer	Lyricist	Language
DRS	Carmela Corren	"Eines Tages"	Cédric Dumont	Kurt Hertha	German
DRS	Carmela Corren	"Ay ay lachende Sonne"	Hazy Osterwald	Kurt Hertha	German
TSR	Marianne Gesseney	"Douce"	Géo Voumard	Emile Gardaz	French
TSR	Yovanna	"Non" (Note: Consistently titled as such in reports referring to the selection, but renamed to "Non, à jamais sans toi" following the event.)	Bob Calfati	Jean Charles	French
TSI	Bruna Lelli	"Tu sei"	Giovanni Pelli	Alberto Testa	Italian
TSI	Wilma Goich	"Un bacio sulle dita"	Iller Pattacini	Grytzko Mascioni	Italian

Swiss Italian broadcaster Televisione svizzera di lingua italiana (TSI) staged the national final on 6 February 1965 at 21:00 CET (20:00 UTC) in the Kursaal Theater in Locarno. It was presented by Mascia Cantoni. For the first 21 minutes of the broadcast, a technical malfunction in the transmission delayed the performances until it was fixed. The whole broadcast reportedly lasted for only forty minutes.

The voting consisted of a twelve-member jury from the three regions of Switzerland, which featured six representatives from the Swiss-German and Romansh regions, four from Romandy (Swiss-French region), and two from Ticino (Swiss-Italian region). The jury was presided over by Paul Henri Jaccard. Each juror would give 3 points to their favorite song, 2 to their second favorite, and 1 to their third favorite. The winner was the song "Non, à jamais sans toi", written by Jean Charles and composed by Bob Calfati— who were both reportedly absent from the event, and performed by Yovanna.

Final – 6 February 1965
R/O	Artist	Song	Total	Place
1	Carmela Corren	"Eines Tages"	5	5
2	Marianne Gesseney	"Douce"	4	6
3	Bruna Lelli	"Tu sei"	11	3
4	Yovanna	"Non"	23	1
5	Wilma Goich	"Un bacio sulle dita"	20	2
6	Carmela Corren	"Ay ay lachende Sonne"	9	4

=== Releases ===
Despite winning the selection and participating in Eurovision, Yovanna would not release "Non, à jamais sans toi" until 1995 in a compilation named after her. In 1998, the song was featured in a CD compilation titled "Concours Eurovision De La Chanson 1956-1998: Schweizer Beiträge", which compiled every Swiss Eurovision entry at the time.

Apart from the winning song, the only other song in the selection was recorded and released commercially by its performer was "Un bacio sulle dita" by Wilma Goich, which first appeared on several releases in 1965, including on an album, EPs, and a compilation.

A cover of "Tu sei", sung by Anita Traversi, has been preserved in the Swiss National Sound Archives. In 1969, an instrumental version of "Eines Tages" was first released by Cédric Dumont, under the pseudonym "Charles Vanberg".

== At Eurovision ==
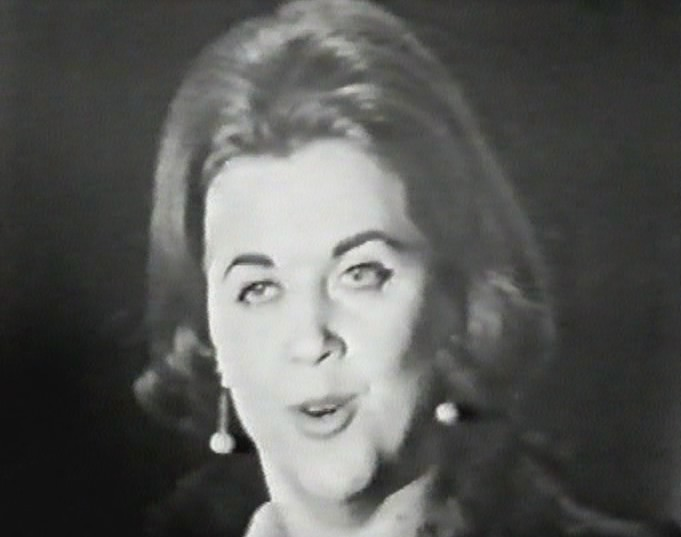
Screenshot of Yovanna performing "Non, à jamais sans toi" at Eurovision

At the Eurovision Song Contest 1965 in Naples, the Swiss entry was the eighteenth and last song of the night following Yugoslavia. The Swiss entry was conducted by Mario Robbiani, who previously composed and conducted the 1960 Swiss entry, "Cielo e terra" by Anita Traversi. At the close of voting, Switzerland had received eight points in total; the country finished eighth among the eighteen participants.

The contest was broadcast on SRG SSR via TV DRS in German-speaking Switzerland, TSR (with commentary from Jean Charles) and Radio Sottens in Romandy, and TSI and Radio Monte Ceneri in Ticino.

=== Voting ===
Each participating broadcaster assembled a ten-member jury panel. Every jury member could distribute 9 points in 3 different ways depending on how the jurors voted; 5, 3, and 1 points to their 3 favorite songs, 6 and 3 points to their 2 favorite songs, or 9 points to a single song.

Points awarded to Switzerland
Score	Country
5 points	France
3 points	Austria

Points awarded by Switzerland
Score	Country
5 points	United Kingdom
3 points	Luxembourg
1 point	Monaco
