= Joël Holmès =

French singer-songwriter (1928–2009)

Background information
- Born: Joël Covrigaru; 1 August 1928; Tighina, Romania
- Died: 2 September 2009 (aged 81) Créteil, Île-de-France, France
- Occupations: Singer-songwriter; composer

Joël Holmès (born Joël Covrigaru; 1 August 1928 – 2 September 2009) was a Romanian-born French singer-songwriter.

== Biography ==
Joël Covrigaru was born on 1 August 1928 in Tighina, then part of the Kingdom of Romania. His father had moved there from the city of Izmail, while his mother was from the village of Talmaza, then part of the Russian Empire. In 1934, Joël moved to France with his parents. During World War II, his parents, Michel Covrigaru (1892–1942) and Hana Ehrlich (1898–1942), foreign nationals of Jewish origin, were interned in the Drancy concentration camp. On 28 September 1942, they were deported to Auschwitz, where they were murdered upon arrival on 3 October. Joel himself was sheltered by a family known to him until the end of the occupation.

After the war, he changed several professions (including working as an electrician and a photographer), then entered the theater department of Le Petit Conservatoire de la chanson Mireille Artyush. Since 1954 he has performed in various Parisian cabarets (Milord l'Arsouille, Cabaret L'Écluse) with Pia Colombo, Maurice Fanon, Georges Moustaki and Jean Ferrat.

After winning the broadcast Numéros 1 de demain of radio Europe 1 in 1958, the name of Joël Holmès gained fame and he recorded his first album. In total, since 1959, 9 albums by J. Holmes have been released with the performance of his own songs (some of which were created with co-authors).

Received the Grand Prix of the Académie Charles-Cros in 1960 (the song was co-written with Georges Mustaki). In 1965 he took part in the Sopot International Song Festival (song "L'amour", lyrics by J. Holmès, music by B. Kesler).

Holmès' most famous songs include "La mer m'a donné" (written with Georges Moustaki), "Jean-Marie de Pantin" (written with Maurice Fanon), "La vie s'en va", "Il y a du chambard dans les marguerites", "Au quai du point du jour". The last album was released in 1966, after which he unexpectedly finished his career. Holmès' songs were subsequently recorded by various performers. The song "La vie s'en va" was translated into Russian by Boris Poloskin and became very popular in the USSR under the name "I Love" («Я люблю») performed by Sergei and Tatiana Nikitin.

He was married to film producer and screenwriter Véra Belmont. His son Stefan was a cameraman.

== Discography ==
=== EP ===
- 1959 – La pierre (Le bal de quartier, La vieille musique, Sur un bord de rive, La pierre)
- 1959 – La grande foraine (La grande foraine, Il y a du chambard dans les marguerites, Dis-donc Pierrot, Au Quai du Point du Jour, Muguet frais)
- 1960 – Le cœur de Julie (Le cœur de Julie, Les souvenirs, La fille du meunier, Un océan d’amour)
- 1960 – La mer m’a donné (La mer m’a donné, C’était Johnny, Jean-Marie de Pantin, Brève rencontre)
- 1962 – La vie s’en va (La vie s’en va, Jupon vole, Le valet, Triste guitare)
- 1963 – Trois branches de lilas blanc (Trois branches de lilas blanc, La noce à Eugène, L’étang, Gardez vos filles)
- 1963 – Fromlock (La romance, À tout choisir, La carriole, Fromlock)
- 1965 – Qu’est-ce qui fait courir le monde? (Qu’est-ce qui fait courir le monde?, Je reviens, Quand deux enfants s’aiment, L’amour)
- 1966 – Les chemins de Rome (Je suis avec toi, Les chemins de Rome, Si je m’écoutais, On n’a donc rien appris)

=== LP ===
- 1963 – Joël Holmes 1963
- 1963 – Mes premières chansons (1958—1963)
- 1964 – Joël Holmes
- 1965 – 12 chansons françaises
