= Knesseth Israel =

Knesseth Israel may refer to:

- Congregation Knesseth Israel (Toronto)
- Congregation Knesseth Israel (Ellington, Connecticut)
- Knesseth Israel Congregation (Birmingham, Alabama)
- Yeshivas Knesses Yisrael (Slabodka)
- Knesset Yisrael, a historical courtyard neighborhood in Jerusalem, Israel
