= List of places with eruvin =

Places containing Jewish Sabbath boundaries

A mechitza (halachik wall) together with an eruv chatzerot (Hebrew: עירוב חצרות), commonly known in English as a community eruv, is a symbolic boundary that allows Jews who observe the religious rules concerning Shabbat to carry certain items outside of their homes that would otherwise be forbidden during Shabbat. An eruv accomplishes this by integrating a number of private and public properties into one larger private domain, thereby avoiding restrictions on carrying objects from the private to the public domain on the Sabbath and holidays.

This is a list of places that have eruvin, both historic and modern, that are or were rabbinically recognized.

== Argentina ==
Buenos Aires

== Australia ==
- Melbourne
- Sydney:
  - Eastern Suburbs
- Perth

== Austria ==
- Vienna

== Belarus ==
- Drahichyn (not functional)

== Belgium ==
- Antwerp

== Brazil ==
- São Paulo (some quarters)
- Rio de Janeiro (some quarters)

== Canada ==
=== British Columbia ===
- Vancouver

=== Nova Scotia ===
- Halifax

=== Ontario ===
- London
- Ottawa
- Toronto
- Hamilton
- Kitchener

=== Quebec ===
- Montreal
  - De Vimy
  - Dollard-des-Ormeaux
  - Hampstead / Côte Saint-Luc / Snowdon
  - Outremont
  - Westmount

== Chile ==
Santiago

== France ==
- Strasbourg
- Metz
- Reims

== Gibraltar ==
- Gibraltar

== Hong Kong ==
- Hong Kong

== Hungary ==
- Budapest

== Israel ==
While this list includes some eruvin in Israel for which references have been found on the Internet, virtually every community in Israel where observant Jews live has an eruv. In many Israeli cities there are multiple eiruvin. For example, in Jerusalem, the Jerusalem rabbinate maintains an eiruv around the whole city, the Edah HaChareidis maintains its own eiruv around major portions of the city, and most chareidi neighborhoods have their own small eiruv with higher standards, some of which do not rely on the above-mentioned leniency of 600,000. Those which lack eruvin include non-Jewish communities like Arab, Bedouin or Druze towns, and some non-religious kibbutzim.

- Acre
- Afula
  - Giv`at HaMoreh
- Ahuzat Barak
- Aminadav
- Arad
- Ashdod
  - Rovas Gimel, Vav, Zayin and Het-Assuta
- Ashkelon
- Avi'ezer
- Azor
- Balfouria
- Bat Yam
- Beersheba
- Beit Ezra
- Beit Hilkia
- Beit Meir
- Beit Nekofa
- Beit She`an
- Beit Shemesh
  - Ramat Bet Shemesh
- Beit Shikma
- Beit Uziel
- Beko'a
- Binyamina-Giv'at Ada
- Bnei Ayish
- Bnei Brak (many neighbourhood eruvim)
- Bnei Re'em
- Dimona
- Ein Harod
- Eilat
- Eitan
- El'ad
- Eshtaol
- Even Sapir
- Gan Yavne
- Ganei Hadar
- Ganei Tikva
- Gedera
- Giv'at Ye'arim
- Giv'at Shmuel
- Giv'atayim
- Gizo
- Hadera
- Hafetz Haim
- Haifa
  - Hadar
- Hatzor HaGlilit
- Hemed
- Herzliya
- Hod HaSharon
- Holon
- Hoshaya
- Jerusalem
  - Arzei Habira
  - Bayit VeGan
  - Givat Shaul and Kiryat Moshe
  - Har Nof
  - Katamon (Erloy)
  - Kiryat HaYovel
  - Romema
  - Sha`arei Chesed
- Kadima-Zoran
- Karmiel
- Kfar Chabad
- Kfar Ma'as
- Kfar Saba
- Kfar Shmaryahu
- Kfar Tavor
- Kfar Yona
- Kerem B'Yavneh
- Kiryat Ata
- Kiryat Bialik
- Kiryat Ekron
- Kiryat Gat
- Kiryat Malakhi
- Kiryat Motzkin
- Kiryat Ono
- Kiryat Shmona
- Kiryat Tiv'on
- Kiryat Yam
- Kiryat Ye'arim
- Lehavim
- Lod
- Ma'alot-Tarshiha
- Mahseya
- Mata
- Matzliah
- Mazkeret Batya
- Meitar
- Mevo Beitar
- Meron
- Metula
- Migdal HaEmek
- Mitzpe Ramon
- Mevaseret Zion
- Migdal
- Modi'in
- Naham
- Na'an
- Nahariya
- Neve Michael
- Nes Harim
- Ness Ziona
- Nehusha
- Netanya
  - City Centre
  - Kiryat Sanz
- Netivot
- Netzer Hazani
- No'am
- Nof HaGalil
- Ofakim
  - Hareidi Community
- Omer
- Or Yehuda
- Pardes Hanna-Karkur
- Petah Tikva
- Ramat Gan
- Ramat HaSharon
- Ramat Yishai
- Ramla
- Ra'anana
- Rekhasim
- Rehovot
- Rishon LeZion
- Rosh HaAyin
- Rosh Pinna
- Ramat HaSharon
- Safed
- Savyon
- Sderot
- Shoham
- Shlomi
- Tarum
- Ta'oz
- Talmei Yehiel
- Tel Aviv
- Tiberias
- Tirosh
- Tzafria
- Tzelafon
- Tzur Hadassah
- Yashresh
- Yavne
- Yavne'el
- Yehud–Monosson
- Yokneam Illit
- Zanoah
- Zekharya
- Zeitan
- Zikhron Ya'akov
  - Ramat Tzvi

== Italy ==
- Venice

== Lithuania ==
- Vilnius (not functional)

== Mexico ==
- Mexico City

== Netherlands ==
- Amsterdam

== Palestine (Israeli settlements) ==
- Ahiya
- Ariel
- Avnei Hefetz
- Beit El
- Beitar Illit
- Bnei Adam
- East Jerusalem
  - Gilo
  - Ma`alot Dafna
  - Neve Yaakov
  - Ramot Aleph
  - Ramot Gimel
  - Ramat Shlomo
- Einav
- Eli
- Elon Moreh
- Esh Kodesh
- Evyatar
- Geva Binyamin (Adam)
- Givat Harel
- Har Brakha
- Harasha
- Hinanit
- Itamar
- Kedem Arava
- Kockav HaShahar
- Kokhav Yaakov-Tel Tzion
  - Tel Tzion
- Kfar Tapuach
- Ma'ale Adumim
- Maoz Tzvi
- Mitzpe Yeriho
- Modi'in Illit
- Leshem
- Mevo Dotan
- Mevo Horon
- Neveh Erez
- Neve Tzuf
- Peduel
- Rehelim
- Revavah
- Rotem
- Selait
- Shaked
- Shilo
- Shvut Rahel
- Tal Menashe
- Talmon
- Tzofim
- Yitzhar

== Poland ==
- Kraków (not functional)

== Portugal ==
- Belmonte

== Russia ==
- Moscow

== Slovakia ==
- Bratislava (not functional)

== South Africa ==
- Cape Town
  - Sea Point
- Johannesburg
  - Edenvale
  - Gallo Manor
  - Glenhazel
  - Illovo
  - Linksfield
  - Morningside
  - Morningside Manor
  - Oaklands
  - Oxford
  - Strathavon
  - Victory Park
  - Waverley
- Pretoria

== Spain ==
Melilla

== Switzerland ==
- Zurich

== Syria (Israeli settlements) ==
- Katzrin

== Ukraine ==
- Odesa (not functional)
- Uman

== United Kingdom ==
- Canvey Island
- London
  - Belmont
  - Brondesbury Park
  - Bushey
  - Chigwell
  - Edgware
  - Elstree/Borehamwood
  - Mill Hill
  - North West London (Hendon, Golders Green, Hampstead Garden Suburb)
  - New Barnet
  - Pinner
  - St John's Wood
  - South Hampstead
  - Stamford Hill
  - Stanmore
  - Woodside Park
- Manchester:
  - Hale (not yet completed)
  - North Manchester (Prestwich, Crumpsall and Broughton)
    - Whitefield (joined to main eruv but independent)
- Westcliff-on-Sea

== United States ==
=== Alabama ===
- Mountain Brook / Cahaba Heights (suburbs of Birmingham).

=== Arizona ===
- Chandler, Guadalupe, Tempe
- Phoenix, Scottsdale
- Tucson

=== California ===
- Albany/Berkeley
- Irvine
- Long Beach
- Los Angeles:
  - Agoura Hills, Beverly Hills, Hancock Park, Pico-Robertson, West Hollywood, and Westwood
  - Chatsworth, Granada Hills, North Hills, and Northridge
  - North Hollywood, Valley Village, Van Nuys, Sherman Oaks, Sherman Village, and Panorama City
  - Woodland Hills/West Hills
- Oakland
- Palo Alto
- San Diego:
  - College Area
  - La Jolla
  - University City
- San Francisco:
  - Noe Valley/Mission
  - Sunset
  - Richmond
- San Jose

=== Colorado ===
- Denver:
  - East side
  - West side
  - Southeast

=== Connecticut ===
- Bridgeport/Fairfield
- New Haven:
  - Yale University
- Norwich
- Stamford
- Waterbury
- West Hartford

=== District of Columbia ===
- Barnaby Woods, Brightwood Park, Chevy Chase, Hawthorne, and Rock Creek Gardens
- Adams Morgan, Burleith, Capitol Hill, Cleveland Park, Crestwood, Downtown, Dupont Circle, Foggy Bottom, Georgetown, Le Droit Park, Mount Pleasant, Navy Yard/Near Southeast, Petworth, Trinidad, and Woodley Park

=== Florida ===
- Aventura
- Bal Harbour
- Boca Raton
- Boca Raton North
- Boynton Beach
- Coconut Grove
- Cooper City
- Coral Springs
- Deerfield Beach
- Delray Beach
- Ft. Lauderdale
- Hallandale
- Highland Lakes
- Hollywood/Fort Lauderdale
- Jacksonville
- Miami
- Miami Beach
- North Miami Beach
- Ormond Beach
- Parkland
- Sunny Isles Beach
- Tampa:
  - Carrollwood (current map)
  - Temple Terrace (archived map)
  - Tampa Palms (Tampa Torah Academy)

=== Georgia ===
- Atlanta:
  - Virginia Highland eruv (also includes parts of the Morningside-Lenox Park neighborhood)
  - North Druid Hills
  - Dunwoody
  - Sandy Springs (Inside the Perimeter)
  - Sandy Springs (Downtown)
  - Alpharetta
- Savannah

=== Illinois ===
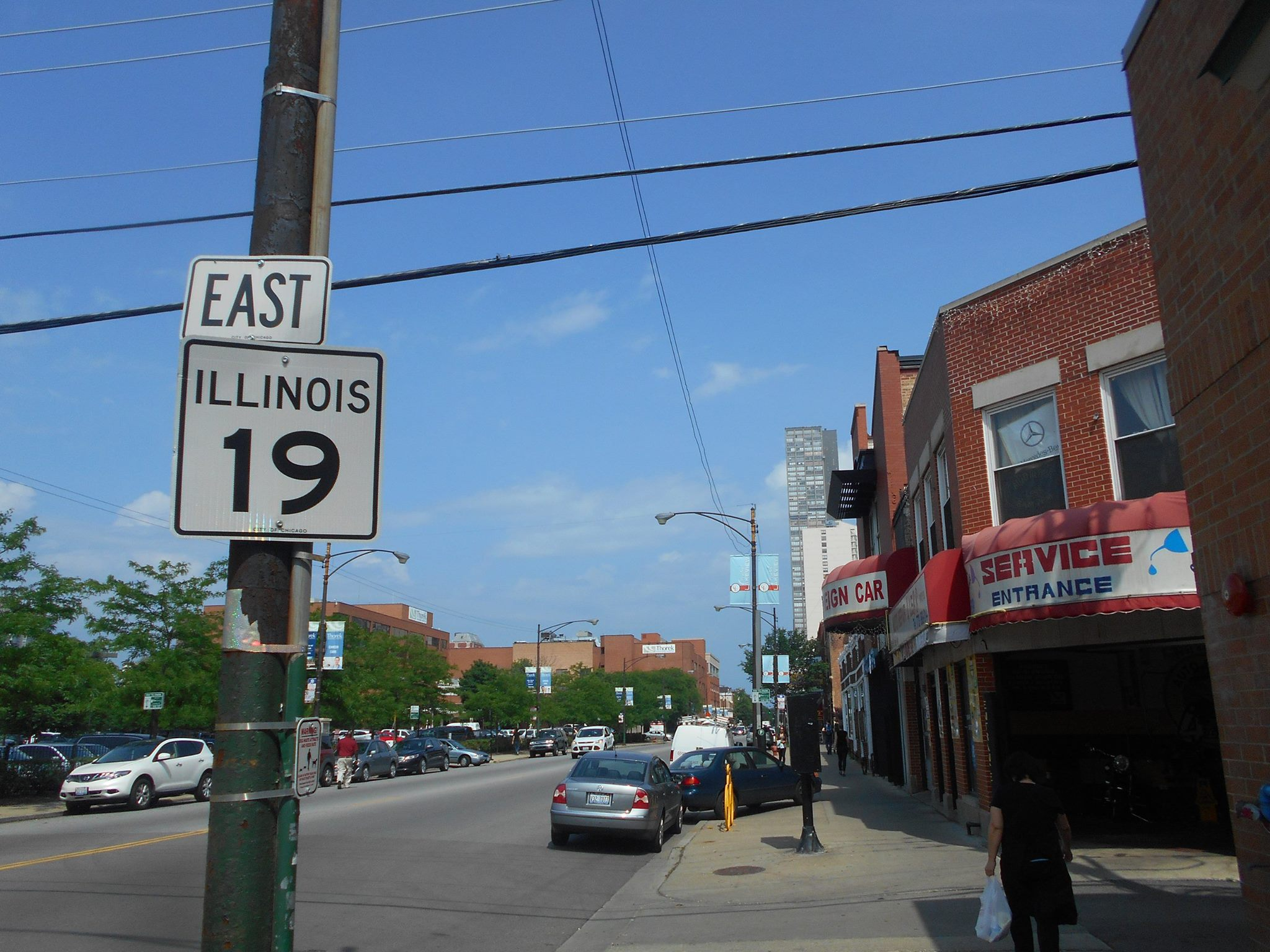
Irving Park Road in Chicago, showing the northern boundary of the city's Lakeview eruv

- Buffalo Grove
- Champaign-Urbana
- Chicago:
  - West Rogers Park (also includes a very small part of the Evanston suburb)
  - Lincolnwood/Peterson Park
  - Lakeview
  - Hyde Park/Woodlawn/Washington Park
- Evanston (Under Construction)
- Glenview/Northbrook
- Highland Park
- Skokie

=== Indiana ===
- Indianapolis
- South Bend

=== Kansas ===
- Overland Park

=== Kentucky ===
- Louisville

=== Louisiana ===
- Metairie
- New Orleans

=== Maryland ===
- Annapolis
- Baltimore
- Bethesda (Conservative)
- Brookeville/Olney
- Chevy Chase
- Glyndon, Owings Mills, and Reisterstown
- Potomac
- Rockville/North Bethesda
- Silver Spring:
  - Colesville, Hillandale, White Oak, Woodmoor, Northwood, Kemp Mill, and Wheaton
  - Woodside Park
- University of Maryland, College Park
- Johns Hopkins University, Homewood Campus.

=== Massachusetts ===
- Brighton, Brookline, Newton, South Newton, and West Newton
- Brandeis University (Waltham).
- Cambridge/Somerville
- Longmeadow/Springfield
- Malden
- Sharon
- Amherst (Downtown, UMass, and Amherst College)

=== Michigan ===
- Ann Arbor
- Southfield
- Oak Park
- West Bloomfield Township

=== Minnesota ===
- Minneapolis/St. Louis Park
- Highland Park, Saint Paul

=== Missouri ===
- Chesterfield
- St. Louis

=== Nebraska ===
- Omaha

=== Nevada ===
- Las Vegas

=== New Jersey ===
- Aberdeen Township
- Bergen County
  - Englewood
  - Fair Lawn
  - New Milford
  - Paramus
  - Tenafly
- Bradley Beach
- Cherry Hill
- Clark
- Cranford
- East Brunswick
- Elizabeth
- Fort Lee
- Jersey City
- Lakewood Township
- Linden
- Livingston
- Long Branch
- Manalapan Township
- Maplewood
- Marlboro Township
- Monroe Township
- Morristown
- New Brunswick
- Parsippany
- Passaic
- Princeton
- Rahway
- Roselle
- Rutherford
- Springfield (Union County)
- West Orange

=== New York ===
- Albany
- Amherst
- Binghamton
- Hudson Valley:
  - Mount Vernon
  - New Rochelle
  - Poughkeepsie
  - Ramapo
  - Scarsdale
  - South Blooming Grove
  - White Plains
  - Yonkers
- Ithaca (Cornell University)
- Nassau County (Long Island):
  - Cedarhurst/Woodmere
  - Great Neck
  - Lawrence
  - Long Beach
  - Merrick
  - North Bellmore
  - Oceanside
  - Plainview
  - Roslyn
  - Valley Stream
  - West Hempstead-Franklin Square
- New York City
  - The Bronx
    - Albert Einstein College of Medicine
    - Kingsbridge
    - Riverdale
  - Brooklyn
    - Brooklyn Eruv, Brooklyn
    - Borough Park
    - Brooklyn Heights
    - Crown Heights Eruv map includes Brownsville & East Flatbush
    - Flatbush has three overlapping eruvin – Haredi, Sefardi, and Modern Orthodox
    - Manhattan Beach
    - Park Slope
    - Williamsburg
  - Manhattan:
    - Midtown Manhattan's eruv spans a large part of the island, but circumvents western Midtown and Hell's Kitchen. It extends to the Upper West Side and Morningside Heights to the northwest; the Upper East Side to the northeast; Greenwich Village to the southwest; and East Village to the southeast. There are also extensions of the eruv to Harlem and Hudson Square/Chelsea.
    - Washington Heights
    - Yeshiva University
  - Queens:
    - Bayswater
    - Briarwood
    - Far Rockaway
    - Forest Hills
    - Hillcrest
    - Jamaica Estates/ Holliswood
    - Kew Gardens
    - Kew Gardens Hills
    - New York Hospital Medical Center of Queens
    - Sunnyside
    - Windsor Park/Bayside
  - Staten Island:
    - Eltingville
    - Willowbrook
- Rochester
- Suffolk County (Long Island):
  - East Northport
  - Stony Brook
  - Westhampton Beach
- Syracuse
- Vestal (Binghamton University)
- Wingdale (Camp Ramah in the Berkshires)

=== North Carolina ===
- Charlotte
- Durham
- Sparta

=== Ohio ===
- Cincinnati
- Columbus
- University Heights

=== Oregon ===
- Eugene
- Portland

=== Pennsylvania ===
- Allentown
- Bensalem
- Elkins Park
- Harrisburg
- Lancaster
- Lower Merion Township has two eruvin, the Lower Merion eruv, in Bala Cynwyd and Merion Station and another eruv in Wynnewood. The two eruvin connect in a few places.
- Narberth (The Lower Merion eruv extends into Narberth, Narberth does not have its own eruv.)
- Philadelphia:
  - Center City
  - Northeast Philadelphia
  - Overbrook
  - University City
- Pittsburgh
- Scranton
- Wilkes-Barre

=== Rhode Island ===
- Providence

=== South Carolina ===
- Charleston
- Columbia
- South Windermere
- West Ashley

=== Tennessee ===
- Memphis
- Nashville:
  - Bellevue
  - Green Hills

=== Texas ===
- Austin
- Dallas:
  - Far North Dallas
  - North Dallas
  - Plano
  - Richardson
- Houston:
  - Fondren Southwest
  - Meyerland
  - Willow Meadows

=== Utah ===
- Encompasses part of the Canyons Resort in Park City

=== Vermont ===
- Burlington

=== Virginia ===
- Encompasses parts of the City of Fairfax and Fairfax County
- Richmond
- Norfolk

=== Washington ===
- Seattle:
  - Seward Park
  - Wedgwood–View Ridge–Ravenna–Laurelhurst
- Mercer Island

=== Wisconsin ===
- Glendale
- Mequon
- Milwaukee

== Uruguay ==
- Montevideo
- Punta Del Este
