= Nurit Hirsh =

Israeli composer, arranger and conductor

Nurit Hirsh נורית הירש
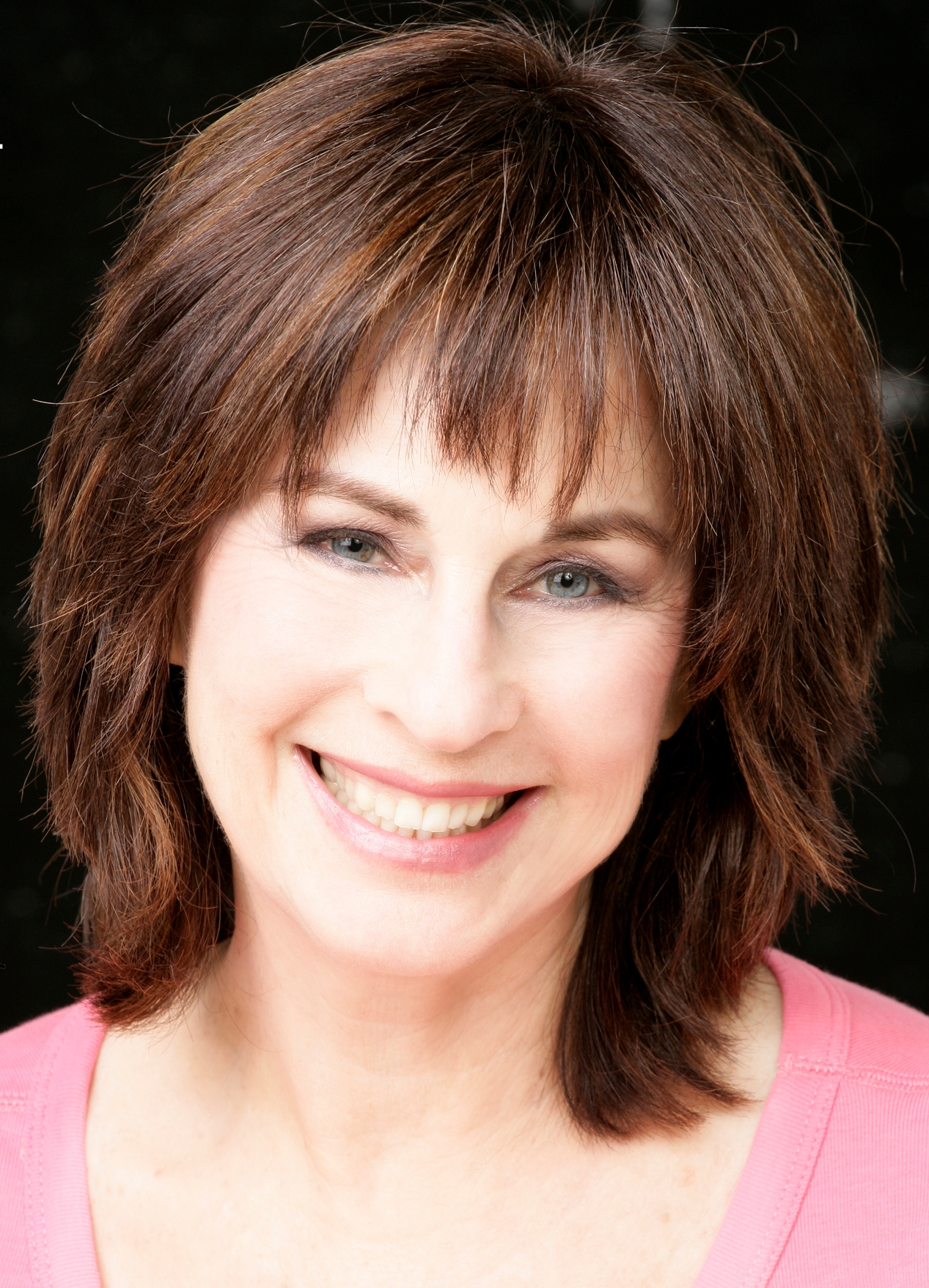
- Nurit Hirsh

Background information
- Born: 13 August 1942 (age 84); Mandatory Palestine
- Occupation: Film composer

Nurit Hirsh (Hebrew: נורית הירש; born August 13, 1942) is an Israeli composer, arranger and conductor who has written over a thousand Hebrew songs. Three of her most famous and widely known songs are Ba-Shanah ha-Ba'ah (Next Year, lyrics by Ehud Manor), Oseh Shalom bi-Meromav (text from the Kaddish prayer). and A-Ba-Ni-Bi, the winning entry in the Eurovision Song Contest 1978.

== Biography ==
Nurit Hirsh (Rosenfeld) studied at the Academy of Music in Tel Aviv, majoring in piano. She also studied composition with Mordecai Seter, orchestration with Noam Sheriff and conducting with László Roth. She studied clarinet with Yaacov Barnea of the Israel Philharmonic Orchestra. Hirsh did her IDF military service with the entertainment troupe of the armored corps. She began composing upon completion of her service, debuting with Perach Halilach, composed in 1965 to lyrics by Uri Asaf and which was made famous by singer Chava Alberstein.

== Music career ==
In 1971 her song "Bashana Haba'a" was covered by Joy as "Next Year" produced by Rod McBrien.

With Ilanit she participated in the Athens song contest. Also in 1971 she represented Israel in the Split Song Festival (Yugoslavia) with ‘Na’ari bayam beito’, performed by Edna Goren, in a Serbo-Croatian version (‘Moren plovi dragi tvoj’), by Ibrica Jusić. In the Viña del Mar Song Festival in Chile she obtained the second prize with ‘Hora nova’ performed by Aliza Azikri. She obtained first prize in the 1972 Malta Children's Song Festival with ‘Makhela Aliza’.

In 1973, her song Ey Sham, performed by Ilanit, placed fourth in the Eurovision Song Contest 1973 in Luxembourg. She orchestrated the song and conducted the orchestra. She was the second female conductor in the contest after Monica Dominique, who conducted the Swedish entry You're Summer the same year.

She won the IBA Children's Festival in 1976 with ‘Lassie shuvi habaita’ sung by Edna Lev.

In the Eurovision Song Contest 1978, again she conducted the orchestra for the Israeli entry A-Ba-Ni-Bi, which she had composed, and which won first prize.

In 1979 she wrote ‘Papa Popeye’ which won the Portuguese Children's Song Festival of Figueira da Foz. In the same year she wrote ‘I want to tell the world about you’ which came second in the Castlebar Song Festival (Ireland).

She won the IBA Children's Festival with ‘Shuvi harmonica’ in 1984 and ‘Lo na’atsor’ in 1985, both sung by Yardena Arazi .

Hirsh wrote the film scores for fourteen Israeli movies, among them Lupo!, Katz and Karasso, Behind Walls and the Ephraim Kishon movie, The Policeman, which was nominated for best foreign picture at the 1972 Academy Awards. She conducted the musical Sallah Shabati during its three-year run at Israel's national theater Habima.

In February 2000, she was the guest of honor at a special tribute concert at the Mann Auditorium in Tel Aviv, where she played piano with the Israel Philharmonic. She has performed together with her daughter, Ruth Rosenfeld, an opera singer, at venues around the world.

She regularly collaborated with Ehud Manor and set many of his songs to music, among them Habatim Shenigmeru Leyad Hayam, Bashanah Haba'ah, Lalechet Shevi Acharayich and tens of other hits, the majority of which were performed by Ilanit, Ofra Fuchs and Rivka Zohar. Hirsh is also known for Oseh Shalom Bimromav, which was composed for the first Hasidic Song Festival, held in 1969, and which took third prize. Her melody has since become part of the liturgy in synagogues and Jewish communities worldwide.

== Awards and recognition ==
- 2001: ACUM life achievement award for songwriting
- 2006: lifetime achievement award from Bar-Ilan University
- 2006: Woman of the Year award from Lions Club Israel.
- 2016:
  - Israel Prize in the field of Hebrew singing and folk art
  - Israeli Artists' Association Lifetime Achievement Award
  - ACUM Levin Kipnis award for children's creative works
- July 2018: the "Hallel v'Zimrah" award at the 29th North American Jewish Choral Festival
