= Stanton Street Synagogue =

Orthodox synagogue in Manhattan, New York

- Yiddish: קאנגרעגיישאן בני יעקב אנשי ברזעזאן
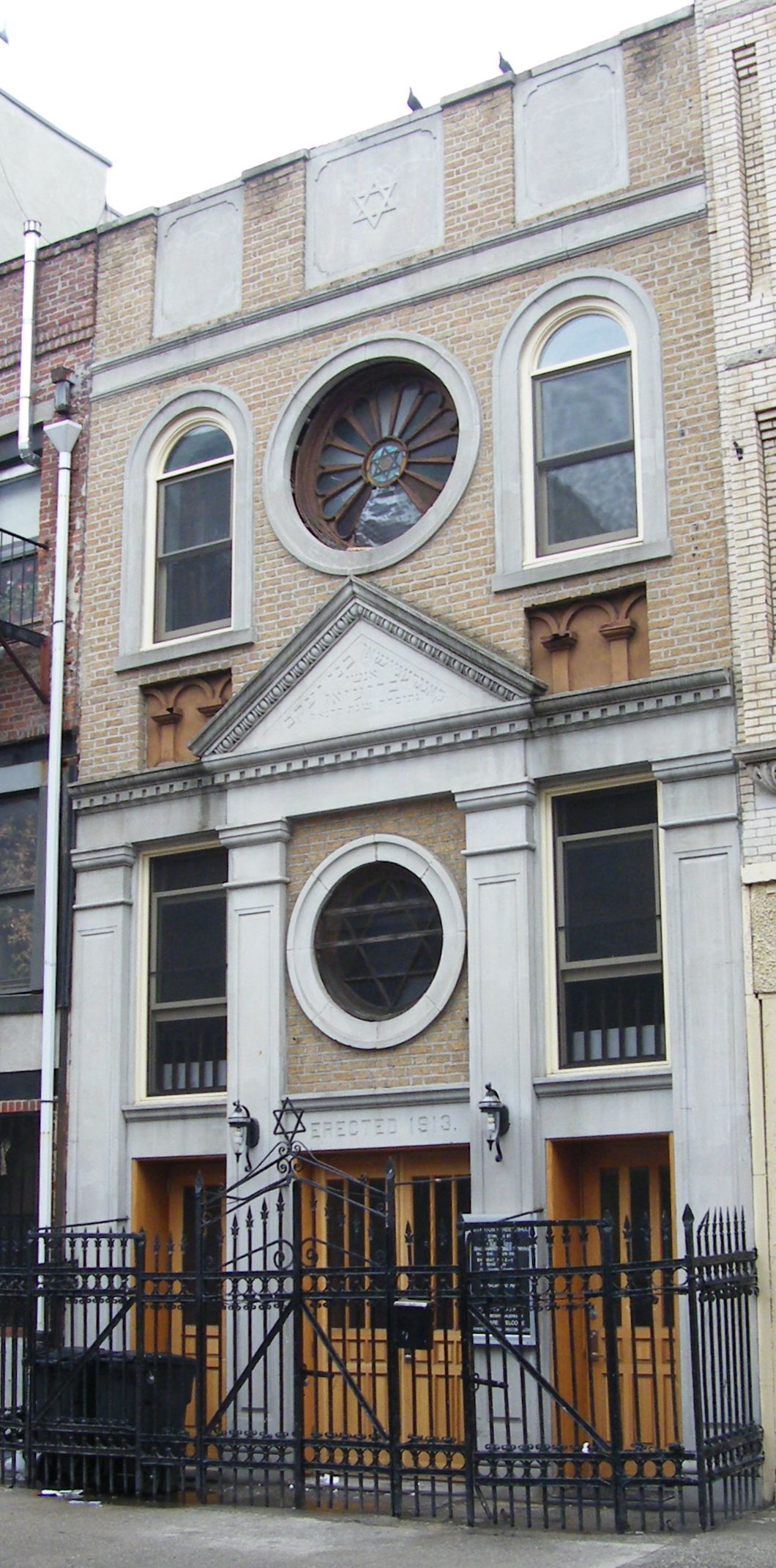
- Stanton Street Shul in 2009

- Location in Lower Manhattan

Religion
- Affiliation: Orthodox Judaism
- Ecclesiastical or organisational status: Synagogue
- Leadership: Rabbi Ben Birkeland
- Status: Active

Location
- Location: 180 Stanton Street, Lower East Side, Manhattan, New York City, New York 10002
- Country: United States
- Coordinates: 40°43′13″N 73°59′02″W

Architecture
- Architect: Louis A. Sheinart
- Type: Synagogue
- Style: Neoclassical
- Established: 1894 (as a congregation)

Specifications
- Length: 100 feet (30 m)
- Width: 20 feet (6.1 m)
- Materials: Stone and brick
- Stanton Street Synagogue
- U.S. National Register of Historic Places
- New York State Register of Historic Places
- Built: 1913
- Restored: 2006–2007
- NRHP reference No.: 02001116
- NYSRHP No.: 06101.012686

Significant dates
- Added to NRHP: October 10, 2002
- Designated NYSRHP: July 24, 2002

Stanton Street Synagogue (also known as Stanton Street Shul and Congregation Bnai Jacob Anshei Brzezan; Yiddish: קאנגרעגיישאן בני יעקב אנשי ברזעזאן, lit. 'Congregation Sons of Jacob, People of Brzezan'), is an Orthodox Jewish synagogue located at 180 Stanton Street on the Lower East Side of Manhattan, in New York City, New York, United States.

The synagogue was constructed in 1913 by a landsmanshaft from the town of Brzeżany in southeast Galicia. The first Rabbi of the congregation, in their first building, was Rabbi Judah Leib Rose (1867-1946). He had arrived in New York in 1909 and encouraged the congregation to build the Shul on Stanton Street.

One of the few surviving tenement-style synagogues, it was listed on the National Register of Historic Places in 2002. That same year, the synagogue's congregants went to court over an attempt by its rabbi and board members to sell the aging structure to an organization run by a Jesuit priest. The resultant settlement and media attention led to a resurgence in interest in the synagogue. In 2012 its membership stood at about 100 congregants, representing a wide, intergenerational mix. The Stanton Street Synagogue was founded as an Orthodox congregation.

== History ==
Jewish immigrants from the Galician town of Brzeżany organized Congregation Bnai Jacob Anshei Brzezan as a mutual aid society in 1894. They built their synagogue on Stanton Street in 1913, with the encouragement of Rabbi Judah Leib Rose. He was to be the first Rabbi of their new building. . The tenement-style synagogue incorporated two existing structures dating to the 1840s, a three-story wood-frame front house and a brick back house, at a cost of $10,000.

A decline in the Jewish population of the Lower East Side beginning in the 1930s and accelerating after World War II led to a decline in synagogue membership. In 1952 the synagogue merged with Bnai Joseph Dugel Macheneh Ephraim, founded by Polish-Jewish immigrants from Rymanów and Błażowa.

In 1964 the congregation appointed Rabbi Joseph Singer, the Pilzner Rav, as its spiritual leader. Singer, a native of Pilzno, Poland, who had fled the Nazis in 1939 and settled on the Lower East Side, served in this capacity until 2002, mostly without pay. Singer, who was also an employee of the United Jewish Council of the East Side, was known as a dedicated advocate for the poor elderly of the neighborhood.

=== Aborted sale ===
Under Singer's leadership, the synagogue served as a prayer and meeting place for immigrants and working poor of the Lower East Side, most of them elderly, such as "former sanitation workers, bakers, rag vendors in their seventies and eighties". By 2000, most of the membership had died or moved away, and it was often difficult to gather a minyan (ten-man quorum) for prayer services. Rabbi Singer would arrange for food to entice potential congregants. While this led to a decent group at the post prayer kiddush, it did not attract more service attendees.

In June 2000, Singer met with the synagogue's board, which congregants alleged largely comprised Singer's own family members. They arranged to sell the run-down building to the National Theatre Workshop of the Handicapped, founded and run by a Jesuit priest, for $1.2 million, a reflection of the rising cost of housing in the neighborhood. Singer did not tell his congregation about the sale until March 2001, when he urged them to merge with a nearby congregation. He was met with fierce resistance. In the ensuing conflict, Singer's family members removed the Torah scrolls from the synagogue. The congregants took the matter to a beis din (rabbinical court), which ruled that the sale could go through and part of the proceeds be used to pay Singer's pension. The congregants then took the case to the New York State Supreme Court. On October 29, 2002, the parties settled with an agreement under which Singer would not try to sell the building and the congregants would not demand a financial accounting of the synagogue's revenues. Singer's family was also ordered to return the Torah scrolls. A supporter of the synagogue provided a three-year annuity to serve as Singer's pension.

=== Synagogue rebirth ===
This episode fueled new interest in the aging synagogue and an influx of younger members to its ranks. New synagogue officers were appointed and grants were sought for repairs. By 2004 membership had topped 100, comprising "an intergenerational mix of Yiddish-speaking Holocaust survivors, middle-aged empty-nesters and twenty- and thirty-something couples and families". In 2012 the majority of members were under the age of 35.

In 2002 the synagogue named Rabbi Akiva Herzfeld as part-time rabbi. He was succeeded in 2006 by Rabbi Yossi Pollak, a student of Open Orthodoxy advocate Rabbi Avi Weiss. In mid-2008, Rabbi Josh Yuter succeeded Pollak. In addition to his rabbinic ordination from the Rabbi Isaac Elchonon Theological Seminary at Yeshiva University, Yuter has a B.A. in computer science and an M.A. in Talmudic studies from Yeshiva University, and an M.A. in social sciences from the University of Chicago. He previously worked as an applications developer for JPMorgan Chase and Information Builders. Yuter has applied his computer programming background to his rabbinic duties, posting his synagogue on Foursquare, a social networking site, in 2011 and maintaining a Twitter feed and personal blog called Yutopia. In March 2014 Yuter announced that he would be stepping down as rabbi and moving to Israel. In November 2014, Rabbi Aviad Bodner succeeded Yuter. Bodner, who received his rabbinic ordination from the Chief Rabbinate of Israel, graduated from Bar-Ilan University and worked as a corporate lawyer in Tel Aviv before joining Stanton. Under Bodner's leadership, synagogue membership increased from about 30 member units to over 100.

== Design ==
Stanton Street Synagogue is one of the last surviving examples of tenement-style synagogue architecture on the Lower East Side. The three-story building, constructed of stone and brick, is situated on a standard 20 feet (6.1 m) by 100 feet (30 m) tenement lot.

Its neoclassical façade has a tripartite design with a central entrance. Four cast-stone pilasters, each two stories high, support an entablature and a pediment upon which the Yiddish name of the synagogue and its date of construction are engraved. The Star of David appears in four places: in an oculus over the main entrance; in a large, circular, stained-glass window over the pediment; engraved onto a stone tablet on the parapet; and atop the stylized wrought-iron gate in front of the building. While the original Star of David design is still visible in the circular windows, most of the original colored glass has broken or fallen out.

Behind the front entrance are stairs leading down to the main sanctuary and Kiddush hall. A wooden bimah (reader's platform) stands in the center of the sanctuary; the wooden Ark is placed to the north. The sanctuary has a tin ceiling and two skylight domes. The women's gallery, situated on two sides of the sanctuary, is no longer in use. Instead of pews, congregants sit in wood and cast-iron school desk-chairs produced in the early 1900s.

Wall paintings around the main sanctuary depict the Zodiac signs for the twelve Hebrew months. Zodiac motifs were once common in synagogues on the Lower East Side, but with the demolition of most of these historic buildings, they are only seen at the Stanton Street Synagogue and the Bialystoker Synagogue. The zodiac paintings are framed by marble pillars, which are in fact trompe-l'œil art. The wall around the Ark is decorated with folk art paintings of the Tower of David and Rachel's Tomb.

The roof and fire escape were renovated by Li/Saltzman Architects in 2006–2007, and the main sanctuary was renovated by architect Ilan Ohayon in 2007.

In 2018, with donations from community members and the synagogue fund, lay leadership, spearheaded by Jeff Katz, made urgent repairs and additional renovations to the roof, back wall, main sanctuary, and women's balcony. Community members and local artists Dory Bergman and David Wander restored several of the wall paintings in the main sanctuary with community member and volunteer Billy Bergman. While the synagogue is now considered viable, its aging structure is in continuous need of repair.

== Activities ==
In keeping with its open door approach, welcoming lively Jewish culture of all kinds, the synagogue schedules frequent musical performances and events. These include "traditional Jewish music...Jewish rock 'n' roll, klezmer and avant-garde jazz" performances. The synagogue has also hosted art exhibitions. For Shavuot 2004, it commissioned artist David Friedman to produce "Borsch and Coffee: Floral Abstractions", an exhibition of 16 paintings in the downstairs Kiddush hall. Friedman incorporated "pigment, acrylic, ink, spray paint, marker, gold powder and, yes, borsch juice and coffee grounds" into his art, the latter as a tribute to one of the nonagenarian congregants who sets up the coffee and Kiddush on Shabbat mornings.

Since 2004, the synagogue has held an annual event, either a Kiddush or sidewalk chalking gathering, memorializing the victims of the Triangle Shirtwaist Factory fire of March 25, 1911. Artists and synagogue board members inscribe the victims' names in chalk in front of the victims' former homes.

In 2015, the Stanton Street Shul launched its monthly Stanton Kids tefila, which includes guided prayers for kids, singing, kid-friendly foods, and a special dvar torah by the rabbi.

== In popular culture ==
In the 1970s, The Village Voice reporter Paul Cowan came across the synagogue and included it in his book, The Tribes of America. Cowan went on to write a best-selling book about the synagogue and its rabbi, Rabbi Joseph Singer, titled An Orphan in History: One man's triumphant search for his Jewish roots. On May 6, 2015, Jewish musical artists Shlock Rock and The Maccabeats released a music video remake of Minyan Man, shot in large part at the Stanton Street Synagogue.

The Stanton Street Synagogue was also featured in a scene of the 1979 movie Last Embrace, starring Roy Scheider and Janet Margolin, and the CBS TV movie Kojak: The Belarus File (1985).
