= Schlock =

Schlock may refer to:

- Schlock (film), a 1973 film by John Landis
- Shlock Rock, a Jewish rock band formed in 1985
- Dr. Irving Schlock, a character in the 1997 webcomic Sluggy Freelance
- Schlock Mercenary, a webcomic by Howard Tayler created in 2000
