= Werfel =

Werfel is a German and Jewish surname, mentioned in Denmark, Poland, Czech Republic. Notable people with the surname include:

- Alma Werfel (1879–1964, Alma Maria Mahler Gropius Werfel, née Schindler), wife of Gustav Mahler, Walter Gropius, Franz Werfel
- Daniel Werfel (born 1971), American administrator
- Franz Werfel (1890–1945), Jewish Bohemian-Austrian novelist, playwright, and poet
- Hanna Werfel (1896–1964), sister of Franz Werfel, wife of Herbert Fuchs-Robettin, mistress of Alban Berg
- Holger Werfel Scheuermann (1877–1960), Danish surgeon; Scheuermann's disease was named after him
- Johan Werfel (1764–1831), Danish writer, translator and magazine publisher
- Louis Werfel (1916–1943), American Orthodox rabbi, military rabbi, The Flying Rabbi
- Roman Werfel (1906–2003), Polish communist apparatchik
- Rudolf Werfel, father of Franz Werfel
- Wayne Werfel, world skip catching champion from Wick in Scotland

Other

- 12244 Werfel (1988 RY2), a main-belt asteroid discovered on 1990
