= Acheinu =

Jewish prayer for those in distress or captivity

Acheinu (Hebrew: אַחֵינוּ, Our brothers) is a Jewish prayer for those who are in distress or captivity.

== History ==
The Acheinu prayer first appears in the Mahzor Vitry, a siddur authored in the 11th century,

== Composition and use ==
Acheinu is a request to God to have mercy on captives and facilitate their redemption and release. It is akin to similar calls to liberate captives on other Jewish occasions, such as the Passover seder.

In the 1980s, songwriter Abie Rotenberg composed a niggun based on the Acheinu prayer text, which he included on his 1990 album Lev V’Nefesh. Released at the height of the First Intifada, Rotenberg's version became one the most widely used versions of Acheinu as an anthem.

During the Gaza war and the enduring hostage crisis, "Acheinu" became a common anthem for Jewish communities alongside the more upbeat "Am Yisrael Chai", with "Acheinu" sung more frequently at funerals, shivas, and prayer times. Jewish a cappella group The Maccabeats sung "Acheinu" at the March for Israel, and political commentator Ben Shapiro sang the song during his syndicated radio show.

== Liturgy ==
Ashkenazic Jews say Acheinu on Mondays and Thursdays, after the reading of the Torah, when the Torah is out of the ark. Sephardic Jews recite it as an introduction to Birkat Hachodesh, recited on the Sabbath before Rosh Chodesh.

== See also ==
- Mi Sheberach, Jewish prayer to request a blessing from God
