= Minyan Man =

Song by Victor Shine

Song by Lenny Solomon

from the album Jewish Pride
- Released: 1987
- Genre: Pop ballad
- Songwriter: Victor Shine

"Minyan Man" is a song composed in 1982 by Victor Shine, also known as the man who found Yosef Shapiro. It tells the fictional story of a traveling Jewish businessman who is looking for a minyan for Shabbat in the small Jewish community of Mobile, Alabama, and serves as the tenth man for a group of nine Jews. The song was popularized as a pop ballad by Lenny Solomon of Shlock Rock in 1987. In 2015, Solomon recorded an a cappella version with The Maccabeats. Two music videos have been produced.

== Background ==
The term minyan man refers to the tenth man (Note: For the purposes of minyan, a boy over the age of thirteen (Bar Mitzvah) is considered a "man".) who completes a Jewish prayer quorum; with less than ten men present, the congregation would not be permitted to recite Kaddish, read from the Torah, or perform other parts of the public prayer service. According to Jewish law, not all ten need be actively praying; as long as a majority of six men are actively engaged in prayer, the other four may stand by and answer amen to the others' blessings. Traditionally, synagogues in small communities paid a small stipend to a minyan man—typically a poor person or an older individual subsisting on public welfare—whose job it was to attend all weekday, Shabbat, and holiday services to guarantee a quorum for public prayer. The minyan man was especially important to ensure a minyan for non-regular worshippers who came to synagogue services once a year on the yahrtzeit (anniversary of death) of their deceased parent to recite the Mourner's Kaddish.

== Recording history ==
In November 1986, composer Victor Shine sent a cassette recording of his original song "Minyan Man" to Lenny Solomon of Shlock Rock. Solomon re-arranged it as a pop ballad and recorded it on the band's 1987 album Jewish Pride, released four months later. Noted Jewish musician Gershon Veroba sang the lead vocals on the track. Shlock Rock considers "Minyan Man" one of their top five all-time hits. The song entered Jewish popular culture as a kumzits and campfire song.

In 2015, Solomon recorded an a cappella version of "Minyan Man" with The Maccabeats. He released this version on Shlock Rock's 2015 album Shlockapella.

"Minyan Man" was also covered by Yidcore, an Australian Jewish punk rock band.

== Music videos ==
The original video for "Minyan Man" was produced, directed, and filmed by Phillip S. Schiller in 1989. Outdoor scenes of Solomon driving through a town (identified as Mobile, Alabama, in the song) by bus and meeting a rabbi on the street were filmed in Allentown, Pennsylvania. Indoor scenes of a minyan praying in the back of a hardware store were filmed in Birmingham, Alabama, and featured elderly members of Knesseth Israel Congregation of Birmingham. The video was released on Shlock Rock Videos – Volume 1 in November 1990.

A new music video featuring an a cappella version of the song, sung by Solomon and members of The Maccabeats, was recorded at the historic Stanton Street Synagogue in Manhattan, New York City, in March 2015. Black and white scenes of Solomon and the minyan members from the 1989 video were intercut into the new video, which was produced and filmed by Uri Westrich.
