= Lenny Solomon =

Lenny Solomon may refer to:

- Lenny Solomon (American-Israeli musician) (born 1960 or 1961)
- Lenny Solomon (Canadian musician) (born 1952)
