= Redhill School (Johannesburg) =

Location
- 20 Summit Road, Morningside, Sandton, Gauteng; South Africa

Information
- School type: Private
- Motto: Free to Build
- Established: 1904; 122 years ago
- School district: District 9
- School number: 011 783 4707
- Headmaster: Mr Joseph Gerassi
- Exam board: IEB, IB
- Grades: 000–12
- Gender: Boys & Girls
- Age: 3 to 18
- Enrollment: 1,000 pupils
- Language: English
- Schedule: 08:00 - 15:00
- Campus: Urban Campus
- Campus type: Suburban
- Houses: Brooks; Kriel; Miller; Thompson
- Colours: Grey; Red; White
- Nickname: Red Radio; The Reds
- School fees: Gr 000 - R86 970 Gr 00 - R86 970; Gr 0 - R93 989; Gr 1 - R104 528; Gr 2 - R104 528; Gr 3 - R111 948; Gr 4 - R111 948; Gr 5 - R126 371; Gr 6 - R126 371; Gr 7 - R143 818; Gr 8 - R143 818; Gr 9 - R143 818; Gr 10 - R148 981; Gr 11 - R148 981; Gr 11IB - R163 880; Gr 12 - R148 981 Gr 12IB - R163 880
- Alumni: Old Redhillians
- Website: www.redhill.co.za

Redhill School is a private English medium co-educational multi-faith day school located in Morningside, Sandton, Gauteng, South Africa. The school's motto is 'Free to Build'.

It was founded in 1907 and has over a thousand pupils from pre-primary (3 years) to high school (grade 12) enrolled. The school is part of ISASA (the Independent Schools Association of Southern Africa) and matriculants write the South African IEB examinations. In 2018, the school also introduced the IB (International Baccalaureate) Diploma Program as an optional parallel program to the IEB.

The school is divided into a Redhill Early Learning Center, Redhill Preparatory School, Redhill Middle School and Redhill High School. All four schools share a campus and facilities.

== Architecture ==
The campus is primarily made up of red-brick buildings with green corrugated iron roofing. The older buildings on the campus are a set of thatched rondavels in a typical African style.
