= Knesseth Israel Congregation (Birmingham, Alabama) =

Orthodox synagogue in Birmingham, Alabama

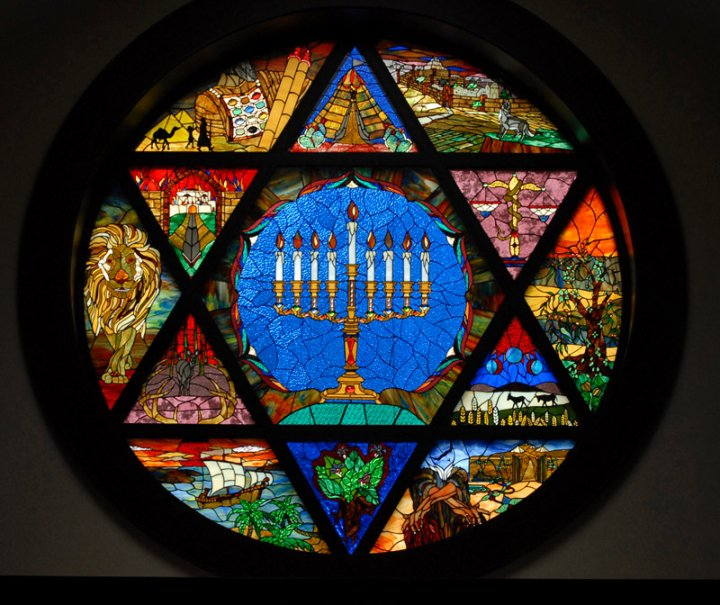

- Location in Alabama

Religion
- Affiliation: Orthodox Judaism
- Rite: Nusach Ashkenaz
- Ecclesiastical or organizational status: Synagogue
- Status: Active

Location
- Location: 3793 Crosby Drive Mountain Brook, Birmingham, Alabama 35243
- Country: United States
- Interactive map of Knesseth Israel Congregation
- Coordinates: 33°28′03″N 86°44′10″W

Architecture
- Architects: Jeffrey S. Fowler, Evan Terry Associates
- Type: Synagogue
- General contractor: Birmingham Hallmark Builders
- Established: 1889 (as a congregation)
- Completed: 2007
- Demolished: 2024

Website
- kicong.org

Knesseth Israel Congregation (abbreviated as KI) is an Orthodox Jewish synagogue, located at 3793 Crosby Drive Mountain Brook, in Birmingham, Alabama, in the United States. The congregation was formed in 1889. Eytan Yammer, a graduate of Yeshivat Chovevei Torah, served as rabbi from 2010 through 2016 and was named by The Forward as one of its 33 most inspiring American rabbis in 2015.

Since 2022, the congregation has been led by lay members.

== History ==
After incorporating in 1889, the first building for the congregation was constructed in 1903 at cost of $15,000 on the southwest corner of 17th Street North and 7th Avenue North, Birmingham at the heart of what was then a Jewish neighborhood populated by immigrants from Russia and Eastern Europe.

In 1955 the congregation moved to a then-remote site at 3225 Montevallo Road in what is now Mountain Brook. A pillar erected in the yard of the $200,000 synagogue on Montevallo Road (which was considered incomplete, with further plans for a 1200-1500 seat sanctuary) was intended to serve as the cornerstone of a more permanent building. A second phase, adding a social and recreational wing, was undertaken in 1969.

In May, 1984, then Rabbi Harry (Tzvi) Rosen (who went on to edit Kashrus Kurrents for the Star-K) discovered that one of the torahs had been stolen from the synagogue. While talking with local police about the theft, he received a phone call asking for ransom money to return the torah scroll, at which point the police called in the FBI. While the investigation was ongoing, early the following month the Rabbi received another phone call indicating that the missing torah had been found in a Salvation Army donation bin.

Knesseth Israel, facing deteriorating conditions in their synagogue, began moving forward with plans for a new building in 2003, taking up the suggestion of relocating to the site of the former Our Savior Evangelical Lutheran Church on Overton Road. The congregation hoped to take advantage of the high value of the Montevallo Road property, which faces the Birmingham Country Club golf course, to help finance the move, which brought them within a few blocks of the Bais Ariel Chabad Center and strengthening ties within Birmingham's Orthodox Jewish community. The congregation voted in December 2005 to make the move and raised $5.4 million in donations. Of the nearly 100 families in Knesseth Israel at the time, many walked to Sabbath services so the decision required them to find new homes in the Overton neighborhood straddling Mountain Brook and Cahaba Heights.

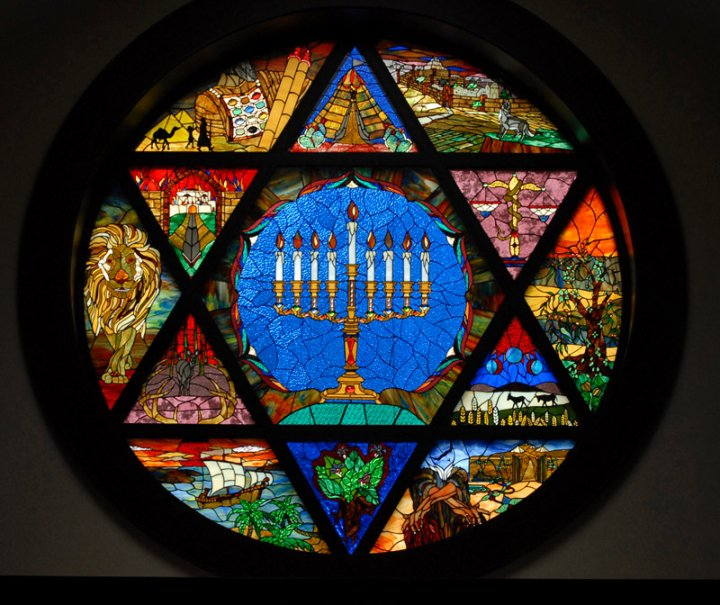
Stained-glass window of Knesseth Israel Congregation, Birmingham, AL by Andrea Lucas

The new 18,000-square-foot (1,700 m^{2}) brick building was completed in Fall 2007. On November 11, 2007, the congregation held a celebratory procession to the new building, carrying the congregation's six Torah scrolls. The new facility included a sanctuary, a smaller chapel, a mikvah for ritual immersion, an outdoor permanent Sukkah structure, offices, classrooms, library, social hall, playground, and two separate kitchens for the preparation of kosher meals. It also featured a 50 square foot rose style stained glass window designed and fabricated by local artist Andrea Lucas. Across the street a new house was also built for the KI rabbi.

However, in July 2012 the congregation, faced with debts arising from a disappointing return on their former property (which was only sold after the nationwide collapse of the real estate market during the 2008 financial crisis), put the new Overton Road building up for sale. Birmingham Jewish Federation president Jimmy Filler contacted prominent community members Fred and Brenda Friedman about the possibility of helping the congregation remain in place by purchasing the building. The result was the establishment of the Fred and Brenda Friedman Center for Jewish Life which hosts events and programs for several Jewish organizations while also providing a temporary home for Knesseth Israel.

In June 2022, the building was sold to the City of Mountain Brook to be the site for a new fire station. The congregation moved all its operations into the nearby rabbi's house in August of that year. The building was razed and the new fire station built. It opened in May 2025.

== Services and programs ==
In February 2012, an eruv covering two square miles of Mountain Brook and Cahaba Heights was erected by Rabbi Yammer (with the Halachic guidance of Rabbi Yaakov Love). As of January 2015, the congregation has a daily morning Shacharit service in combination with the Chabad Center (Sundays, Mondays, and Thursdays at Chabad; Tuesdays, Wednesdays, and Fridays at KI), regular Shabbat and Holiday services followed by a full kiddush lunch, and Friday night Kabbalat Shabbat services weekly. There is also an education program for young children held on Sunday mornings and multiple weekly adult learning programs.

== In popular culture ==
Elderly members of the Knesseth Israel Congregation appeared in the 1990 music video for "Minyan Man", recorded by Lenny Solomon and Shlock Rock.

== Leadership ==
=== Rabbis ===
The following individuals have served as rabbis:

Ordinal	Office holder	Term begin	Term end	Time in office	Notes
1	Rev. M. Herman	1891	1891	0 year	
2	M. Grosberg	1897	1899	1–2 years	
3	Rev. Rabbi Yasgour	1904	1904	0 year	
4	J. T. Loeb	1909	1913	3–4 years	
5	Rev. A. Feinsilver	1913	1918	4–5 years	
6	Rev. Jacob Mendelsohn	1918	1920	1–2 years	
7	Solomon Katz	1921	1922	0–1 year	
8	Rev. David Stein	1923	1924	0–1 year	
9	Abraham Chaimovitz	1925	1926	0–1 year	
10	H. A. Laibovitz	1926	1930	3–4 years	
11	Abraham Bengis	1930	1933	2–3 years	
−	Isadore Sperling	1933	1934	0–1 year	Lay leader
12	Alex Klein	1937	1941	2–3 years	
13	Louis Werfel	1942	1943	0–1 year	
14	Joseph Goldberg	1943	1946	2–3 years	
15	Jonathan Silberberg	1949	1955	5–6 years	
16	David Tamarkin	1955	1957	1–2 years	
17	Seymour Atlas	1959	1962	2–3 years	
18	Nahum Ben Nathan	1963	1967	3–4 years	
19	Moshe Stern	1968	1980	11–12 years	
20	Harry (Tzvi) Rosen	1980	1987	6–7 years	
21	Reuven Tradburks	1987	1994	6–7 years	
22	Meir Rosenberg	1995	1997	1–2 years	
23	Avraham Shmidman	1998	2007	8–9 years	
24	Karmi Ingber	2007	2009	1–2 years	
−	Eldad Zamir	2009	2009	0 years	visiting Rabbi for High Holidays
25	Eytan Yammer	2010	2016	5–6 years	
26	Moshe Rube	2017	2022	4–5 years	

== Notable members ==
- Philip Birnbaum

== See also ==
- List of synagogues in the United States
- List of places with eruvin
