= Petervale =

- Location within Gauteng Location within South Africa
- Coordinates: 26.037°S 28.039°E
- Country: South Africa
- Province: Gauteng
- Municipality: City of Johannesburg
- Main Place: Sandton

Area
  - Total: 0.72 km^{2} (0.28 sq mi)

Population (2011)
  - Total: 928
  - Density: 1,300/km^{2} (3,300/sq mi)

Racial makeup (2011)
  - Black African: 33.4%
  - Coloured: 4.3%
  - Indian/Asian: 7.4%
  - White: 51.7%
  - Other: 3.1%

First languages (2011)
  - English: 63.6%
  - Afrikaans: 8.6%
  - Zulu: 4.7%
  - Xhosa: 3.4%
  - Other: 19.6%
- Time zone: UTC+2 (SAST)
- Postal code (street): 2191
- PO box: 2151

Petervale is a suburb of Johannesburg, South Africa. It is located in Region E of the City of Johannesburg Metropolitan Municipality.

Petervale is located next to the N1 highway and is bounded by the suburbs of Rivonia, Bryanston and Paulshof. It is further close to Sunninghill and Morningside Manor. In Petervale there is a small shopping centre and a clinic, a block of flats, a bakery, a garage (petrol station), a laundromat, a post-office, a DVD rental franchise outlet.
