= Mike Tompkins =

Mike Tompkins may refer to:

- Mike Tompkins (politician)
- Mike Tompkins (musician)
