= BaShana HaBa'a =

Israeli song

External videos
- BaShana Ha-Ba'ah – Ilan e Ilanit
- Kochooloo عارف - کوچولو – Aref
- Başıma Gelenler – Nilüfer
- Kaplumbağa Çocuk Şarkısı – Onur Erol
- Göksel – Başıma Gelenler

"BaShana HaBa'a" (Hebrew: בשנה הבאה, lit. 'Next Year') is a 1970 Israeli song with music by Nurit Hirsch and lyrics by Ehud Manor. The song was first performed by the duo Ilan & Ilanit.

== Background ==
The song was written by Ehud Manor in memory of his younger brother Yehuda Weiner, who was killed during his military service in 1968. The song describes Manor's dream to spend more time with his late brother.

Manor asked Nurit Hirsch to orchestrate his lyrics, at the request of Shlomo Zach, the manager of the singer Ilanit. Hirsch composed the song with a melodic and melancholic tune, in a 6/8 rhythm. Zach believed that the song did not suit Ilanit's career at that point, and he requested both Hirsch and Manor to create a version that was joyful and filled with hope. Hirsch adjusted the melody accordingly, changing the rhythm to 4/4. In parallel, Manor made changes to the lyrics. Originally, Manor concluded the song with the words: "Anafa levana tifros ba or knafayim, vehashemesh tishka b'tochan" – "A white heron will spread its wings in the light, and the sun will set within them"; a description of the reality seen from the balcony of his home, facing from the Carmel mount to the west. At the request of Hirsch, Manor chose the alternative and optimistic wording, "Hashemesh tizrach b'tochan" – "The sun will rise within them."

== Versions of the song ==
=== In Israel ===
The song was first performed by the duo Ilan & Ilanit and had many versions over the years by different singer including Rinat Gabay, Gitit Shoval and Ron Druyan, Uzi Hitman, Gali Atari and Hani Nahmias, Yaffa Yarkoni, Dalia Cohen, Hovi Star, Israel Gurion, Sarai Tzuriel, Shiri Maimon and Ido Maimon.

=== In the world ===
The song became popular among Jewish communities in the world. In 2020, the Jewish A Capella group the Maccabeats released a cover for the song. Steve Lawrence and Eydie Gorme featuring The Mike Curb Congregation also made a cover to the song.

The same melody was arranged and sung by Iranian singer Aref as "Kochooloo" (K"uchulu)", and by Turkish singer Nilüfer as "Başıma gelenler". Julius Wechter and the Baja Marimba Band covered the song on their 1971 album Julius Wechter and the Baja Marimba Band's Back under the title "Anytime of the Year (Bashana Haba'ah)". Claudine Longet recorded it in 1971 as "Anytime of the Year," but with the Hebrew lyrics. Roberto Blanco performed a German version of the song called "Dieses Jahr" (1971).
