= March for Israel =

2023 demonstration in Washington, D.C., U.S.

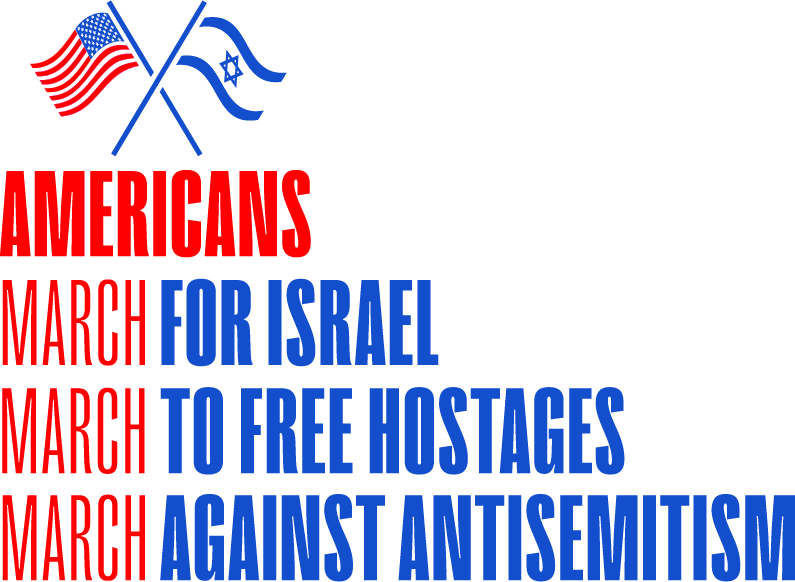

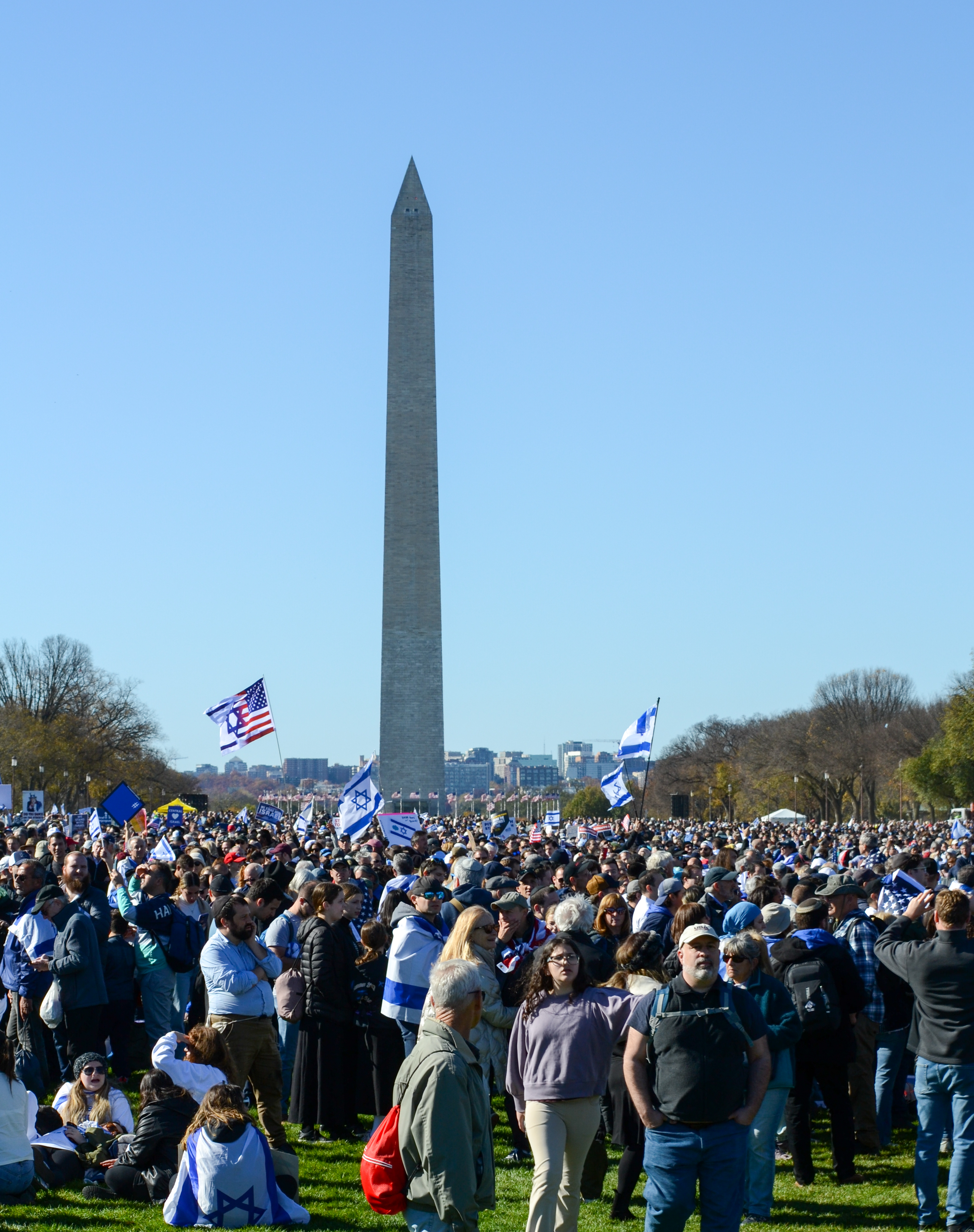
- Date: November 14, 2023
- Venue: National Mall
- Location: Washington, D.C., United States
- Cause: Response to Gaza war
- Participants: 290,000 (claimed by organizers)
- Website: marchforisrael.org

The March for Israel was a pro-Israel demonstration that took place at the National Mall in Washington, D.C., on November 14, 2023. The rally was organized by the Conference of Presidents of Major American Jewish Organizations (CoP) and the Jewish Federations of North America in solidarity with Israel during the Gaza war.

Initially, the number of attendees was predicted to be 60,000. Event organizers said the final turnout was much higher, estimating that 290,000 people attended the rally and an additional 250,000 joined via livestream. Organizers said the March for Israel was "the largest pro-Israel gathering in US history" and "the largest Jewish gathering in US history."

The stated goals of the rally were to support Israel, call for the release of hostages taken by Hamas, and to combat antisemitism.

== Background ==
The Gaza war has sparked numerous protests, demonstrations, and vigils across the world. The protests have focused on a variety of issues related to the conflict and have been held on varying scales since the October 7 Hamas attacks.

According to March for Israel website, the rally had three main objectives. In addition to standing in support of Israel, the other two goals were to raise awareness for and demand the release of the more than 240 hostages still being held by Hamas after over a month since the October 7 attacks. The rally was also aimed at condemning a rise in antisemitism following the start of the war, during which the New York City Police Department reported a 164 percent increase in New York City, and the Los Angeles Police Department reported a 140 percent increase in Los Angeles.

== Attendees and speakers ==
The organizers, Jewish Federations of North America and Conference of Presidents of Major American Jewish Organizations, initially estimated 60,000 people would attend the event, according to the permit they filed to hold the event. However, that evening, organizers said the total turnout was much higher, estimating that 290,000 people took part. They further reported that 250,000 people joined via live stream. That number of attendees would make the March for Israel the largest pro-Israel and the largest Jewish gathering in US history.

The Homeland Security Department designated the event as a "level 1" security event, that required substantial law enforcement assistance from federal agencies. While the FBI and Homeland Security had sent out a joint bulletin to law enforcement agencies prior to the march warning about potential violence, the bulletin did indicate that no specific actionable threat had been identified. Many attendees came by charter buses organized by their Jewish communities. Groups came from New York, New Jersey, Los Angeles, Houston, Miami, Boston, Kansas City, Philadelphia, Birmingham, Alabama and other domestic and international locations. Attendees who flew in from Detroit, including Michigan state senator Jeremy Moss, were unable to attend when bus drivers scheduled to take them from Dulles International Airport staged a walk-off.

Speakers at the rally included Senate Majority Leader Chuck Schumer, House Speaker Mike Johnson, House Minority Leader Hakeem Jeffries, senator Joni Ernst, Montana Tucker, televangelist John Hagee, Israeli president Isaac Herzog (via video from Jerusalem), and U.S. envoy on antisemitism Deborah Lipstadt. Other notable speakers included Natan Sharansky actress Debra Messing, actor and comedian Michael Rapaport, and family members of hostages kidnapped by Hamas. Organizers told The New York Times that the diverse speaker roster was intended to reach "across divisions" and be bipartisan, reflecting broad support by the United States Congress. Several musicians also performed at the event, including Ishay Ribo, Omer Adam, Matisyahu, and the acapella group The Maccabeats. The Maccabeats performed Acheinu, the Jewish prayer calling for the release of captives, and the group joined Matisyahu for a rendition of Matisyahu's hit song "One Day."

According to Eric Fingerhut, President and CEO of Jewish Federations of North America, President Joe Biden was unable to speak at the rally as he was traveling to San Francisco that day for the 2023 APEC Summit.

Political analyst Van Jones called for a ceasefire in the war between Israel and Hamas.

=== Criticism of John Hagee's attendance ===
John Hagee's presence at the demonstration was criticized by progressive Jewish organizations such the Jewish Council for Public Affairs, J Street, and IfNotNow, and by the Council on American–Islamic Relations. The leader of one such Jewish organization said he was blindsided by the apparent last minute decision to include Hagee, claiming his inclusion had been shot down before the march as organizers wanted to ensure a big-tent protest.

Hagee has a history of making controversial remarks; writing in MSNBC, Emily Tamkin highlighted how Hagee had previously stated that Adolf Hitler was sent by God to carry out the Holocaust to "help Jews reach the promised land". The Council on American–Islamic Relations said that Hagee had a history of "Islamophobia and antisemitism" and should not have been invited to speak, arguing it was hypocritical to invite Hagee while accusing pro-Palestinian marches of being antisemitic. Congresswoman Summer Lee wrote: "I'm deeply concerned that members of both parties shared a stage yesterday with noted antisemitic bigot John Hagee. This must be condemned."

In defense of Hagee's attendance at the rally, one of the organizers stated: "The comments that people object to from Pastor Hagee are older, and he has disavowed these comments, and they have not recurred," and "I think we all believe that people can grow and learn and evolve."

== See also ==
- National March on Washington: Free Palestine
- List of rallies and protest marches in Washington, D.C.
