= StandFour =

American a capella group

- Origin: New York, New York, United States
- Genres: A cappella
- Years active: 2012–2015
- Spinoff of: The Maccabeats
- Members: David Block; Noey Jacobson; Nachum Joel; Immanuel Shalev

StandFour is an American a cappella group from New York City made up of four former members of Yeshiva University's all-male a cappella group The Maccabeats. Formed in November 2012, the group is composed of four graduates of the university: David Block, Noey Jacobson, Nachum Joel, and Immanuel Shalev. StandFour is largely popular among the American Jewish community and the related blogosphere.

Their first song/video was released immediately after their formation, entitled "Eight Nights," and is a Hanukkah parody/mashup of three songs: "Some Nights" by Fun, "Die Young" by Ke$ha, and "Live While We're Young" by One Direction. As of November 9, 2019, "Eight Nights" has been viewed over 1,627,265 times on YouTube.
