= Candlelight (The Maccabeats song) =

Single by The Maccabeats
- Released: November 26, 2010
- Genre: Pop, rhythm and blues
- Length: 3:42
- Songwriters: Immanuel Shalev and David Block

"Candlelight" is a song by the band The Maccabeats that was released in November 2010. It achieved viral status. The song is a transformation of Mike Tompkins's a cappella cover of the Taio Cruz song "Dynamite" to lyrics about the holiday of Hanukkah. The Maccabeats are an all-male Jewish a cappella student group that formed at Yeshiva University.

The lyrics were written by Immanuel Shalev and David Block; Uri Westrich, a medical student and alumnus, made the video.

The song reached #1 on Billboard magazine's Comedy Digital Tracks chart in December 2010.

This song led to many more Hanukkah parody and cover music videos being made by Jewish music groups.
