= Lenny Solomon (American-Israeli musician) =

Israel-American entertainer

Lenny Solomon (born 1960 or 1961) is an American-Israeli musician and founder of Jewish rock band Shlock Rock.

== Early life and education ==
Solomon was born in New York to a family with cantors on both sides going back generations. He studied music and accounting at Queens College. Solomon joked that he wanted to be an accountant, but his parents pressured him to go to Juilliard and become a musician.

== Career ==
In 1985, after three years as an accountant, Solomon "looked at the rest of my life as an accountant and decided that I should at least give music a chance." He chose the band's name because "'Shlock' means secondhand, and half the music we play is secondhand rock with new words." Shlock Rock's first album, "Learning is Good", was released in 1986. Their 1990 original song, "Minyan Man", was described as Shlock Rock's "most enduring hit" and was later remade with the Maccabeats.

Shlock Rock parodies popular secular songs, substituting new, Jewish religious-themed lyrics for the originals, and is "best known for songs that educate and entertain through parody." According to Solomon, the band pays licensing fees to originators for every parody album, though it is unclear if this is legally required. Solomon has viewed his impact as helping teach Jewish concepts, promoting positive feelings about Judaism, and inspiring people to learn more about their Jewish heritage. After moving to Israel in 1996, Solomon continued to perform in North America as well as in Israel.

In 2011, Shlock Rock released Shabbat in Liverpool, "adapting Shabbat services to the tunes of Lennon and McCartney." In its 25th anniversary year, the band released a Broadway compilation called “Still Not Quite on Broadway” that features songs from “Wicked,” “Hairspray,” “Rent” and “The Sound of Music.”

A 2024 documentary about Solomon, “The King of Shlock", won best short at Jerusalem's Maale Film School's festival. Though Solomon was absent for health reasons, the win was received by the crowd with cheers of “Keep on Shlockin’!” The film was featured at the 2025 Doc Aviv film festival. In the film, Jewish rapper Etan G. says Solomon belongs in the 'Mount Rushmore of Jewish music' with Mordechai Ben David, Avraham Fried, and Shlomo Carlebach.

== Personal life ==
Solomon has four children and is a grandfather. He lives in the Israeli city of Bet Shemesh.
