= Pilzno (Hasidic dynasty) =

Polish Hasidic dynasty

Pilzno is a Hasidic dynasty named for the town of Pilzno in Southern Poland. It was founded by Rabbi Gershon Adler. Rabbi Joseph Singer, a grand son of Adler was the Pilzno Rav in America. He was a refugee who was the spiritual leader of the Stanton Street Synagogue on the Lower East Side of Manhattan, New York, from 1964 to 2002. Rabbi Singer appointed his disciple, Rabbi Yehoshua Gerzi, to build and carry on the Chasidus. Gerzi was sent to open a branch of Pilzno Hasidut in Israel. Rabbi Singer has a great grandson Rabbi Mattisyahu Braver who will become the Pilzno Rav in New York.

== Leadership ==
=== Rabbi Joseph Singer ===
Rabbi Joseph Singer (1915–1 October 2006), a native of Pilzno and an eighth-generation descendant of Rabbi Abraham Gershon of Kitov, the brother-in-law of the Baal Shem Tov, founder of the Hasidic movement. Rabbi Singer's father, Rabbi David Singer, had served as Rav of Pilzno from 1898 to 1914.

Singer fled Nazi and Communist persecution in 1939, emigrating to New York's Lower East Side. He worked as a diamond cutter and as an employee of the United Jewish Council of the East Side while volunteering as an advocate for the poor elderly of the neighborhood. He was appointed as spiritual leader of the Stanton Street Synagogue in 1964 and served in this capacity until 2002, mostly without pay.

=== Rabbi Yehoshua Gerzi ===
Rabbi Gerzi is the Rav of Beis Dovid Pilzno in Ramat Shilo, a subdistrict of Ramat Bet Shemesh, Israel, and the founder and dean of the Pilzno Institute for Higher Learning in that city. He is also the rabbinic coordinator for the International Kosher Organization kosher certifying agency.

== Philosophy ==
The four main pillars of the Pilzno philosophy, as developed by Rabbi Gerzi under the guidance of Rabbi Singer, are:

- Guidance – the importance of having one or several mentors to influence and guide one's growth and development (corresponding to the י in God's name, and our spiritual state)
- Knowledge – the importance of creatively acquiring and applying knowledge (corresponding to the first ה in God's name, and one's mental and creative state)
- Relationships – the importance of surrounding oneself with a supportive network of friends (corresponding to the ו in God's name, and one's social and emotional state)
- Physical and financial health – the importance of expending the necessary effort to be physically healthy and financially responsible (corresponding to the final ה in God's name, and one's physical and financial state).
