= Mike Tompkins (musician) =

Canadian musician

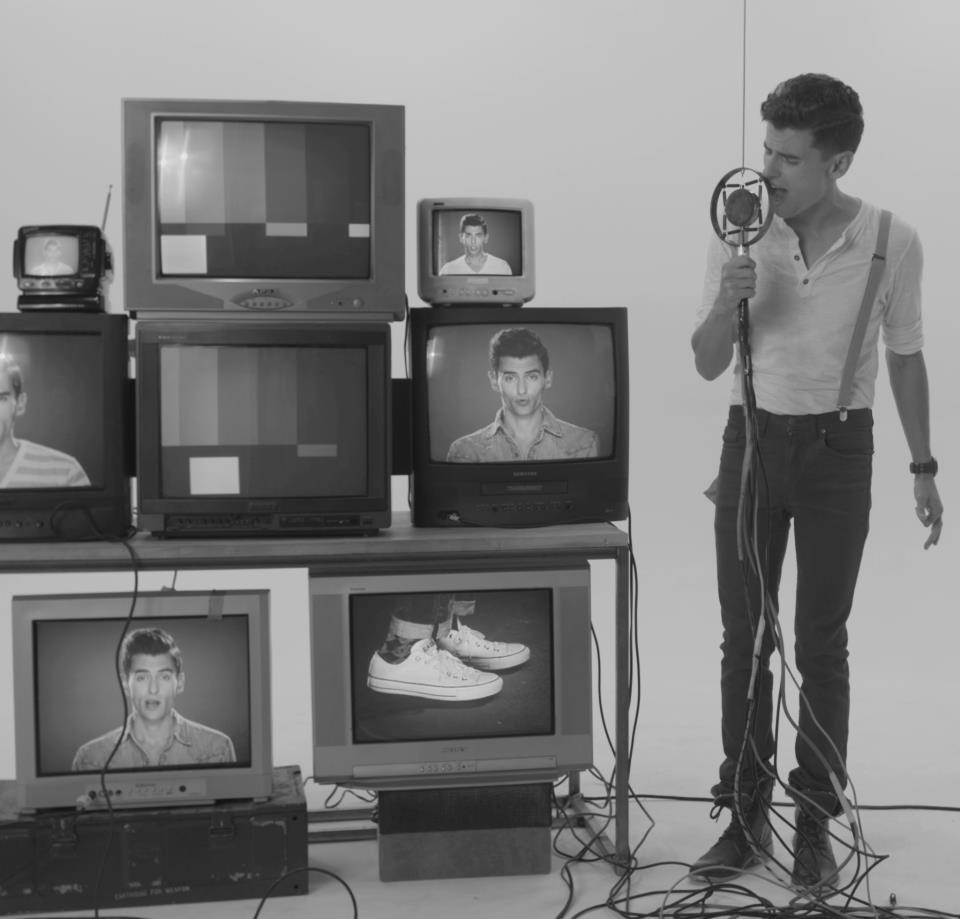
- Tompkins in 2013

Background information
- Also known as: pbpproductions / Mike Tompkins (channel name)
- Born: July 31, 1987 (age 39); Edmonton, Alberta, Canada
- Origin: Ilderton, Ontario
- Genres: Pop, Cover songs
- Occupation: Acapella singer / youtuber
- Instruments: Vocals, beatboxing
- Years active: 2006–present
- Website: www.tompkins.life

Mike Tompkins (born July 31, 1987) is a Canadian musician from Ilderton, Ontario. He primarily records acapella covers and original songs, using only his mouth and voice. He has been partnered with Maker Studios, but is now an independent artist. He has been featured on both the Today Show and The Ellen DeGeneres Show.

== Career ==
Tompkins was born in Edmonton, Alberta, on July 31, 1987. He graduated from the Ontario Institute of Audio Recording Technology. He graduated with a diploma in music production, receiving honours distinction and two awards. He started his musical career on YouTube in 2009. Since then, he has amassed more than 2.4 million subscribers to his channel and over 320 million views on his videos. He has collaborated with artists including Peter Hollens, the cast of Pitch Perfect, Glenn Morrison, Christina Grimmie, Karmin, Bonnie McKee, Tessa Violet, t.A.T.u., Max Schneider, Bethany Mota, and The Muppets. He held 29 concerts in 2014. He has toured Los Angeles 3 times, Pittsburgh 2 times, Bridgeport, Dublin, and Philadelphia once. He has appeared with Lindsey Stirling 13 times, Heffron Drive 9 times, and Kendall Schmidt 2 times.

== Covers ==
Tompkins has done acapella covers of "Forever", "Party in the USA", "Paradise", "Firework", "Rolling in the Deep", "Cool Kids", "Teenage Dream", "Dynamite", "Starships", "We Are Young", "Just the Way You Are", "Uptown Funk", "Shut Up and Dance", "Acapella", "Closer", "Cold Water", "Cheap Thrills", "Drag Me Down", "Don't Let Me Down", "Love Myself", "See You Again", "Want to Want Me", "Fireflies", "Where Are Ü Now", "Sugar", "Thunder" and many others. Tompkins' music video for Taio Cruz's "Dynamite" was itself parodied by The Maccabeats, a Jewish a cappella group from Yeshiva University, in their cover version of "Dynamite" called "Candlelight" (2010).

The very first cover that Tompkins did was the song Party in the USA.

== Personal life ==
Tompkins has another YouTube channel together with his wife, Kayla Tompkins, and their puppy Jackson and their son titled "Tompkins Life". The couple has one son, Dash Michael Tompkins, born on Mike's birthday. The channel has newly uploaded videos every Monday, Wednesday, and Friday. Tompkins has also moved house to Nashville, Tennessee.

Tompkins also has a sibling named Bryan Tompkins.

== Discography ==
=== Studio albums ===
- 2015: Season One
- 2016: Season Two

=== EPs ===
- 2020: THEN & NOW
