= Rock Creek Gardens =

Neighborhood of Washington, D.C., United States

Coordinates: 38.9887°N 77.0455°W

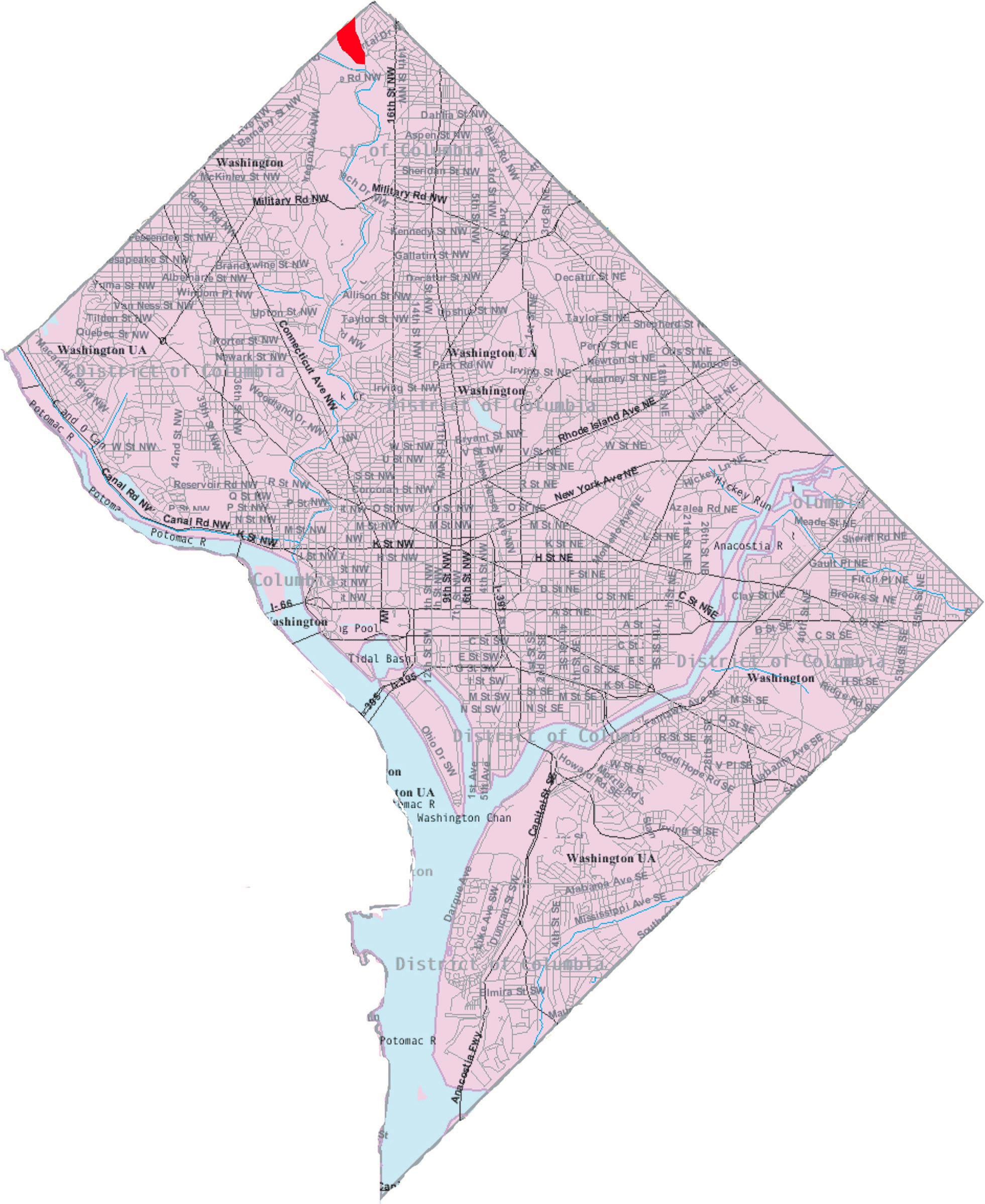
Map of Washington, D.C., with Rock Creek Gardens highlighted in red

Rock Creek Gardens is an affluent residential condominium neighborhood in Northwest, Washington, D.C..

It is bounded by West Beach Drive to the east and northeast, Parkside Drive to the south and southwest, and Rock Creek Park to the northeast.

== Description ==
West Beach and Parkside also abut the park, making Rock Creek Gardens the only neighborhood in the city to be surrounded entirely by Rock Creek Park, hence its name. It is not set on or adjacent to any major thoroughfare in the city: the only access to the neighborhood is by taking Portal or North Portal Drive via the rotary intersection on 16th Street NW; turning south on East Beach Drive; west on a short strip joining East and West Beach Drives; then turning either direction on West Beach.

Because of its isolation via the park and lack of major streets, the neighborhood is extraordinarily suburban in character, full of winding streets, detached houses on large lots, and open space.

Rock Creek Gardens and the rest of Ward 4 are represented in the Council of the District of Columbia by Janeese Lewis George.

Rock Creek Gardens is also the name of two condominium complexes, one immediately adjacent to the neighborhood but in Maryland, which also borders the park (on Washington Avenue and Grubb Road), and another in Georgetown (on Q Street NW).
