= Ehud Manor =

Israeli lyricist, translator, poet, and radio and television personality (1941-2005)

- אהוד מנור
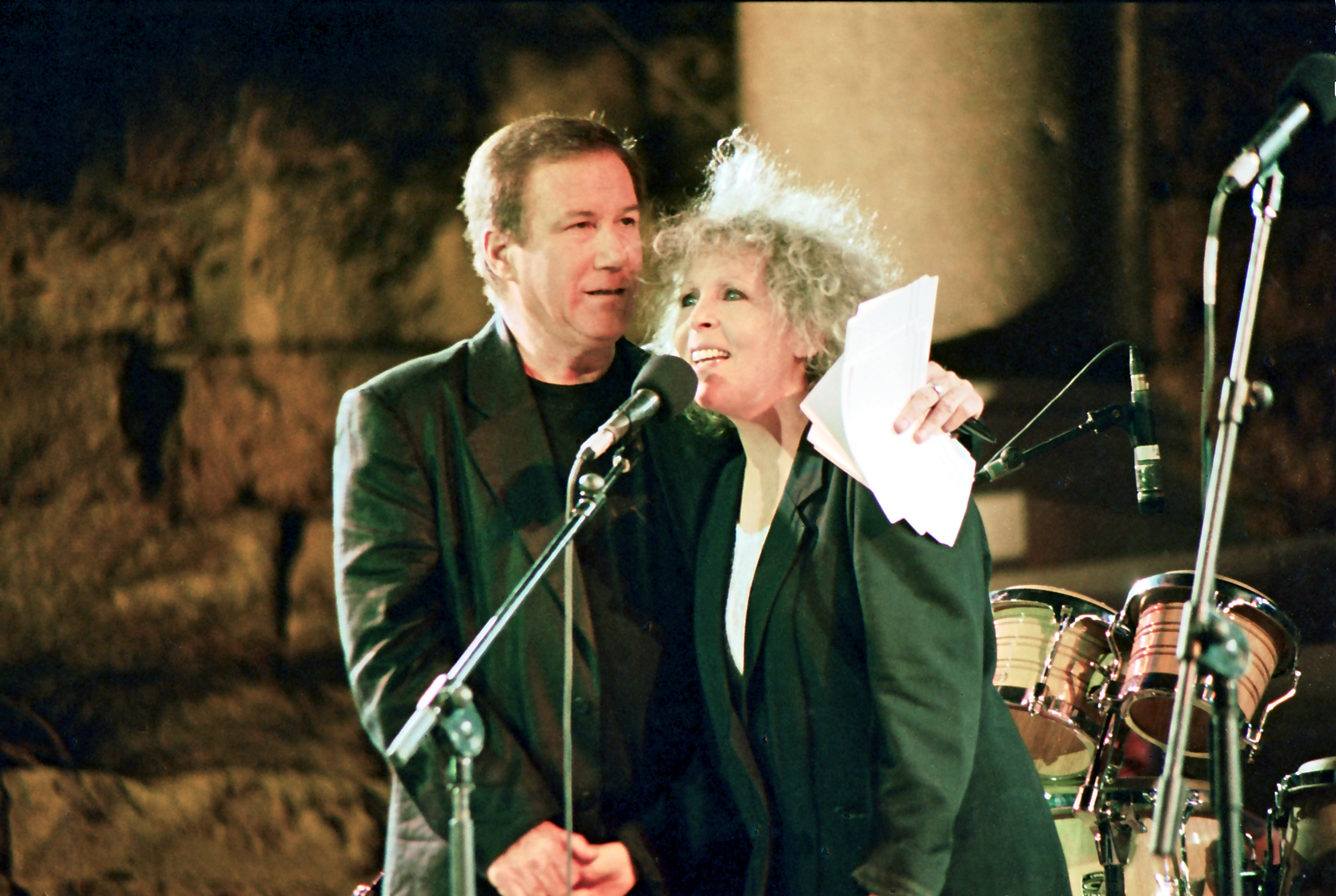
- Manor with his wife Ofra Fuchs
- Born: Ehud Weiner; July 13, 1941; Binyamina, Mandatory Palestine (now Israel)
- Died: April 12, 2005 (aged 63)
- Citizenship: Israeli
- Occupations: lyricist, translator, and radio and TV personality
- Awards: 1998 Israel Prize

Ehud Manor (Hebrew: אהוד מנור; born Ehud Weiner; July 13, 1941 – April 12, 2005) was an Israeli lyricist, translator, poet and radio and TV personality. He is widely considered to have been Israel's most prolific lyricist of all time, having written or translated over 1,000 songs. In 1998, he was awarded the Israel Prize for his exceptional contributions to Israeli music.

== Biography ==
Ehud Weiner (who later changed his name to Manor) was born in Binyamina, in what is now Israel. He had two brothers, Ze'ev and Yehuda. He graduated from the Hebrew Reali School in Haifa in 1959. He was married to actress Ofra Fuchs for 40 years; together, they had three children: Gali, Libby and Yehuda (Yadi), who was named after Manor's late brother, a fallen soldier in the War of Attrition in 1968. Ehud's other brother, Ze'ev, committed suicide in 2003 as a result of financial trouble.

Ehud Manor, who had been a heavy smoker earlier in his life, was diagnosed with lung cancer in the early 2000s. Although he recovered, the cancer treatment weakened his heart, and he died suddenly on April 12, 2005, aged 63, of cardiac arrest.

== Music and songwriting career ==
Ehud Manor began working for Israel radio in the 1960s as a musical editor. He changed his surname to Manor as it was customary at the time for radio announcers to adopt Hebrew names.

During his career, he wrote lyrics for over 1,250 Hebrew songs, including "Ein Li Eretz Acheret" (I Have No Other Country), "Brit Olam" (Everlasting Covenant), "Ba-Shanah ha-Ba'ah" (Next Year) which became an international standard, "Zo Yalduti HaShniya" (This Is My Second Childhood), and "Ahi HaTza'ir Yehuda" (My Younger Brother Yehuda). The latter was written in memory of his brother, who was killed during his military service in 1968.

Ehud Manor wrote the lyrics to several Israeli Eurovision Song Contest entries, including the 1978 winner "Abanibi", the 1975 entry "At Va'Ani (You and Me)" with its singer Shlomo Artzi, the 1983 entry "Chai" (Alive) and the 1992 song "Ze Rak Sport" (It's Just Sports).

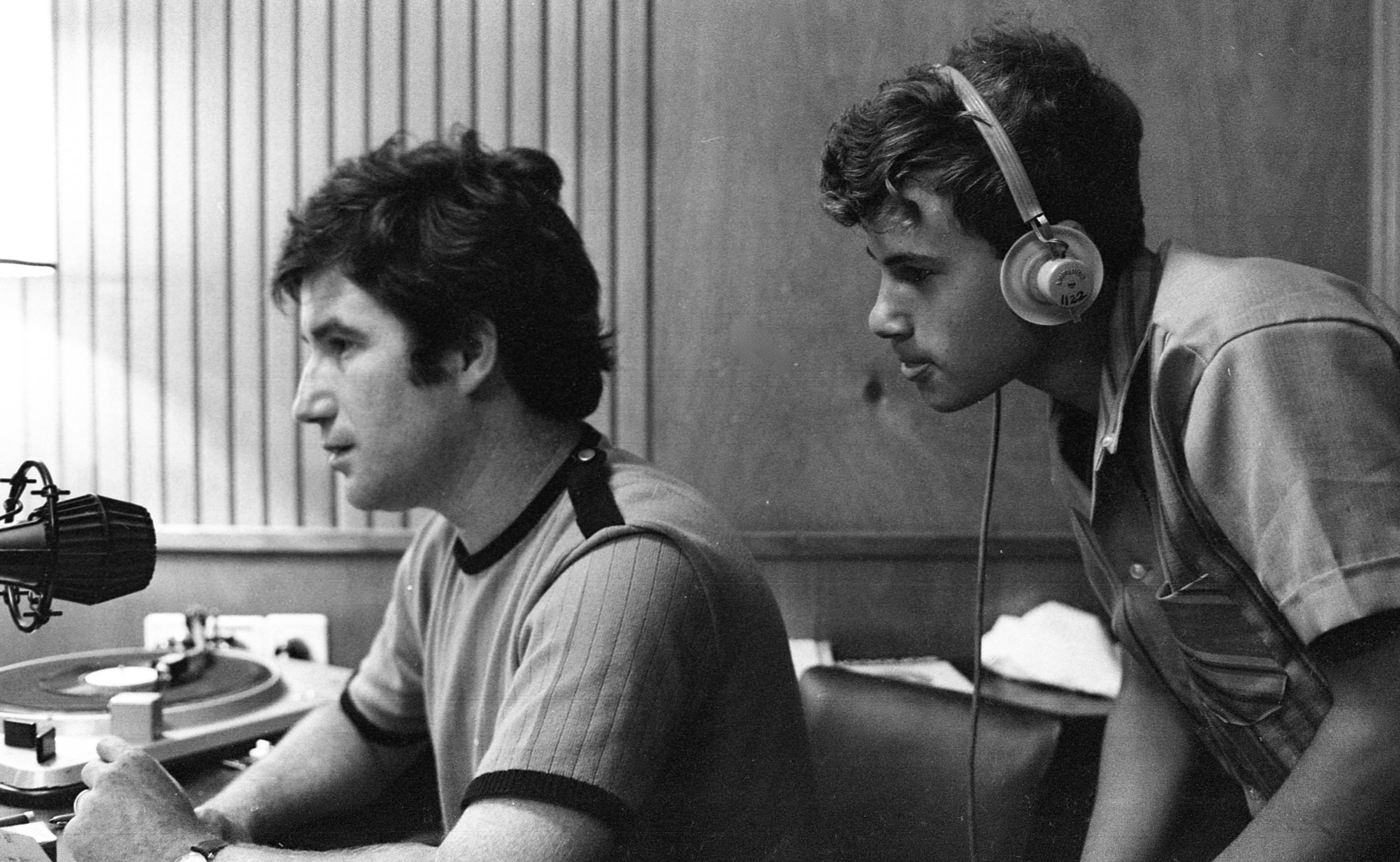
Ehud Manor in his night radio show, 1969

Several of his songs commemorate his fond memories of his childhood in Binyamina, the most famous of which is "Yam'ei Binyamina" (Binyamina Days). Several streets and roundabouts in his native town are named after him and his songs.

== Literary career ==
Also a successful translator, Manor translated more than 600 works into Hebrew, including such Broadway hits as Cabaret, Hair, and Les Misérables. In addition, he translated Barney songs into Hebrew for the Israeli coproduction "Hachaverim Shel Barney".

Other famous Manor translations were the 1977 musical program "Eretz Tropit Yafa" (lit. "A Beautiful Tropical Country", the theme of which was a translation of Jorge Ben's "País Tropical") which consisted of his translations of famous Brazilian songs, several of which became huge hits in Israel; and the 1982 Israeli television show "Red River Valley" in which he translated famous country songs, one of which – "John Biryon" (lit. "John the Strongman", a translation of Jimmy Dean's "Big Bad John") – also became a huge hit.

== Awards and recognition ==
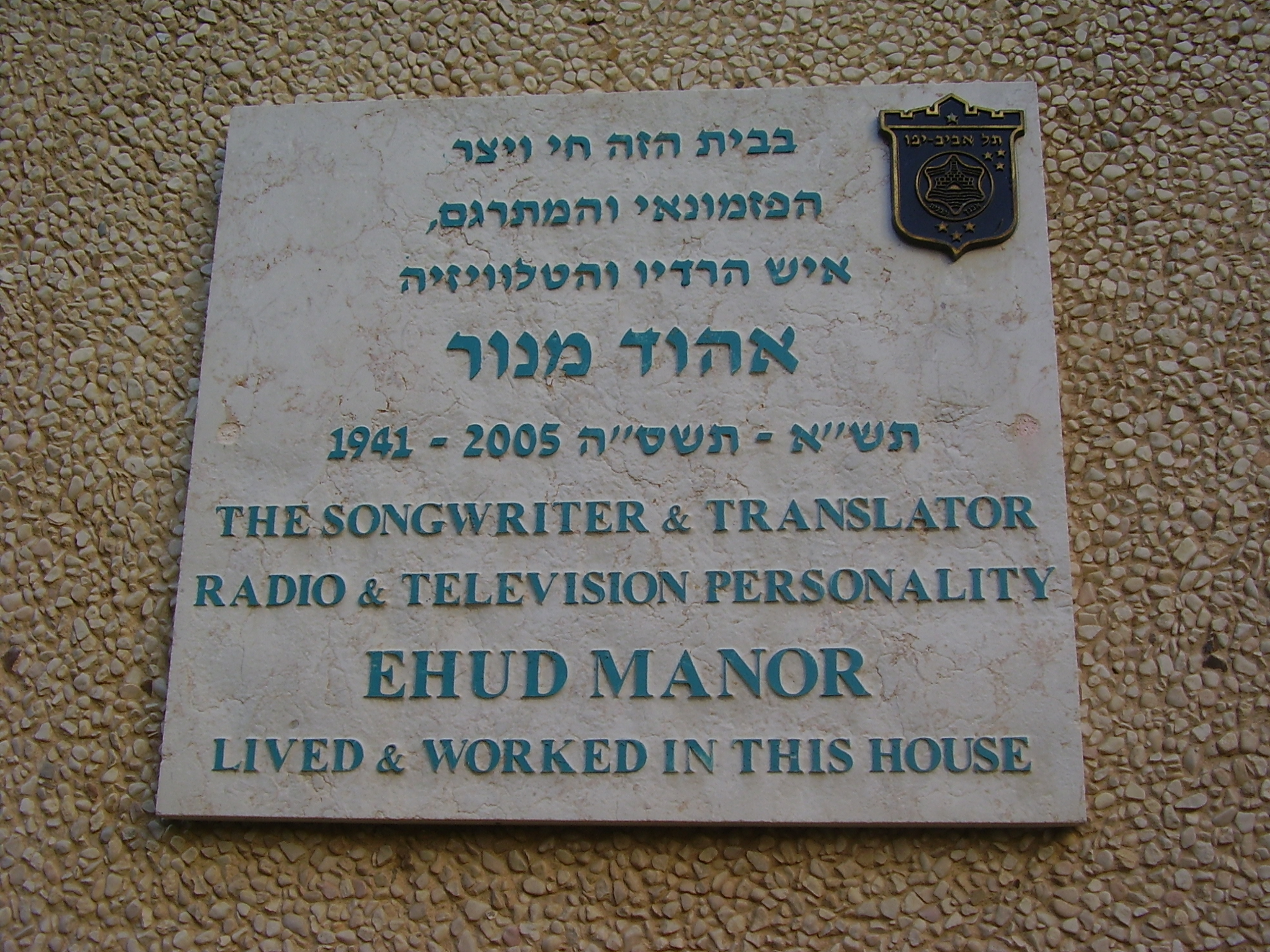
A memorial plaque on the building in Tel Aviv where Manor lived and worked

In 1998, Manor was awarded the Israel Prize for Hebrew song. The prize committee noted that "For the past 30 years, he has expressed our mood through the hundreds of songs he has written together with the finest composers. The man who declared that he had no other country is the laureate of the Israel Prize." The words of the committee refer to one of his most famous songs, Ein Li Eretz Acheret (I Have No Other Country), which is considered a patriotic classic in Israel – the lyrics outline a man who loves Israel and the Hebrew language, despite criticism he has toward his country.

Shortly before he died, Manor was chosen to receive an honorary doctorate from Bar-Ilan University in recognition of his prolific activity in the field of Hebrew music.

Manor's songs are the most played on Israeli radio.

On April 22 2009, the Israeli Stamp Service issued a series of 12 postal stamps on the subject of Israeli music. One of the stamps in this collection was dedicated in memory of Manor. The stamp, with a portrait of Manor, was designed by the artist Miri Nestor Sofer. The stamp's tab included a line from Manor's song "Ein Li Eretz Aheret" (I Have No Other Country) - "I Have No Other Country".

On October 28, 2019, U.S. House Speaker Nancy Pelosi recited a passage from I Have No Other Country during a J Street gala. On January 13, 2021, she again recited lines from the song urging her "Republican colleagues to finally open their eyes" regarding president Donald Trump. On June 24, 2022, she once again recited lines from the song following the Supreme Court's ruling in Dobbs v. Jackson Women's Health Organization, which overruled two important cases (Roe v Wade and Planned Parenthood v. Casey) regarding Abortion in the United States. She learned about the song from Isaac Herzog, then the leader of the Israeli Labor Party in December 2016.

== See also ==
- List of Israel Prize recipients
- Music of Israel
- Culture of Israel
