= Uri Asaf =

Israeli poet, songwriter, and playwright

- אורי אסף
- Born: August, 1936; Kfar Menahem, Mandatory Palestine
- Died: March 11, 2025; Gan Yavne, Israel
- Education: University of Tel Aviv
- Occupations: poet, songwriter, playwright
- Years active: 1952-2025

Uri Asaf (Hebrew: אורי אסף; August 1936 - March 11, 2025) was an Israeli poet, songwriter, and playwright.

== Biography ==
Asaf was born and raised in Kibbutz Kfar Menahem, where his parents were among the kibbutz's founders. He began writing songs in his youth, adapting them to well-known melodies. He served in the Israel Defense Forces as a reconnaissance and intelligence officer and took part in the Suez Crisis with the 51st Battalion of the Golani Brigade, under the command of Meir Pa'il.

After his military service, Asaf began writing his own songs. The songs that he wrote were composed by Shlomo Biderman, and through him, Asaf came to know leading singers of the early 1960s, such as Nechama Hendel and Esther Ofarim. The song “Shadows,” performed by Nechama Hendel, was his first to be played on the radio.

At the age of 40, he left the kibbutz and lived for several years in Kfar Mordechai before moving to Gan Yavne. He held a master's degree in Hebrew literature and theater from Tel Aviv University.

Asaf died on March 11, 2025.

== Discography ==
Asaf wrote 78 songs, some of which became well-known in the 1960s and 1970s. For example, his song "Perah Haliah" (פרח הלילך) was performed by Chava Alberstein and Arik Einstein.
