= Congregation Knesseth Israel (Toronto) =

Orthodox Jewish congregation in Toronto, Ontario, Canada

Congregation Knesseth Israel ק"ק כנסת ישראל
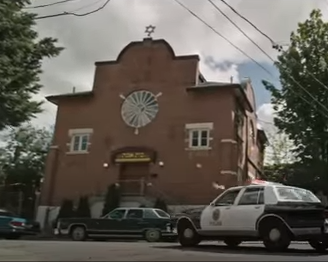

Religion
- Affiliation: Orthodox Judaism
- Rite: Nusach Ashkenaz
- Status: Active

Location
- Location: 56 Maria Street; Toronto, Ontario; M6P 1W2
- Interactive map of Congregation Knesseth Israel ק"ק כנסת ישראל
- Coordinates: 43.666354°N 79.475527°W

Architecture
- Architect: James Augustus Ellis
- Style: Byzantine Revival
- Groundbreaking: 1912
- Completed: 1913

Specifications
- Direction of façade: East
- Materials: brick, wood

Website
- junctionshul.org

Congregation Knesseth Israel, also known as the Junction Shul, is an Orthodox Jewish congregation in Toronto, Ontario, Canada. Its synagogue building is the oldest surviving in Toronto that is still in use, and was designated an Ontario Heritage site in 1984 under the Ontario Heritage Act.

Located at 56 Maria Street, in Toronto's Junction neighbourhood, the congregation was established in 1909 by Jewish immigrants, largely from Russia and Poland. Services were originally held at a home at 303 Maria Street. In 1911, the tract of land on which the synagogue was built was purchased for $520 with construction beginning shortly thereafter.

The Knesseth Israel Jewish Synagogue, Maria Street at Shipman Street, (1911) was designed by James Augustus Ellis (architect) of the firm Ellis and Connery. It was built with the bartered labour and donated funds of the founding members and their families. The building was dedicated on September 8, 1912, and services began in 1913. At its peak, in the 1920s, the temple served more than 200 Jewish residents in the neighbourhood, with the presence of the synagogue contributing to a dramatic rise in Jewish migrants to the neighbourhood.

The building has a modest red brick facade with minimal ornamentation or detail. A double-side staircase leads to two heavy wooden doors. Circular windows on three sides of the building are divided into eighteen segments to symbolize the Hebrew word chai (life). Its interior is decorative and elegant in a traditional Eastern European style. The women's gallery on the top floor is a three-sided upper-level balcony. The lower level of the sanctuary has three sides of seating facing the centre. The ark housing the Torah scrolls is situated against the eastern wall.

Many of the congregants were artisans, peddlers, shopkeepers or scrap and metal collectors while a large number of residents who were carpenters or cabinet makers found work at the nearby Heintzman & Co. piano factory on Keele Street. A number of these cabinet makers carved much of the synagogue's interior wooden architectural details.

The synagogue's only rabbi was Mordechai Langner who served the congregation from 1924 until 1939. Subsequently, services were conducted by a cantor or congregants.

Toronto's Jewish population migrated north after World War Two, resulting in the synagogue remaining largely closed except for holidays and special events since the 1950s. Nevertheless, it has a congregation of 80 full-time and 300 associate members most of whom grew up in the area or are descended from the founding members.

Philanthropist and arts patron Joey Tanenbaum is the grandson of one of the synagogue's founders and attended services as a boy. He remains a member and funded the synagogue's restoration in the 1990s.

The synagogue was used as a filming location for the 2017 movie It.

In 1910, the congregation founded Lambton Hills Cemetery.
