= Louis Werfel =

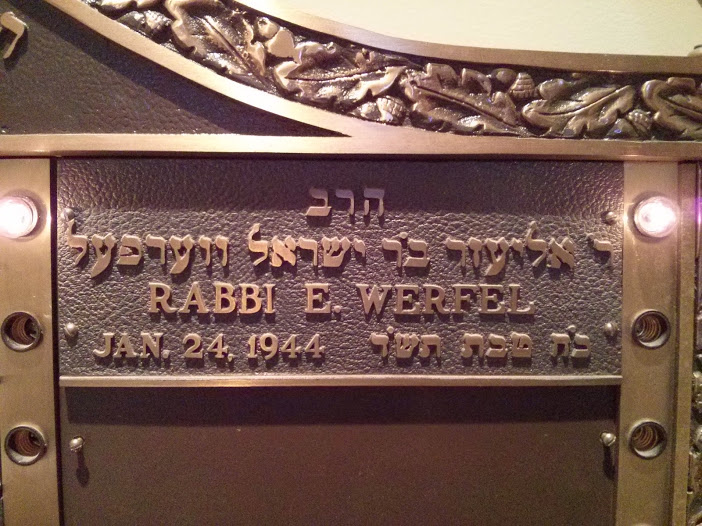
Louis (Eliezar) Werfel's memorial plaque at Knesseth Israel Congregation, Birmingham, AL.

Chaplain Louis (Eliezer) Werfel (1916 – 25 December 1943) was an American Orthodox Rabbi and Jewish chaplain who was one of only six Jewish Chaplains and the only Orthodox Rabbi killed in action during World War II. Werfel's fellow soldiers gave him the nickname "The Flying Rabbi" because he traveled to remote locations throughout North Africa by plane.

Werfel attended Yeshiva University, graduating from its Yeshiva College for Men in 1937, and earning rabbinic ordination from its Rabbi Isaac Elchanan Theological Seminary in 1940. After enlisting in the Army in August 1942, he trained at the Chaplain’s Center at Harvard.

He died on December 25, 1943, when the plane he was travelling on crashed into a mountain in Algeria.

He was initially buried in North Africa, but army regulations in 1950 required that his body be sent back to the United States. After the return of Werfel's body to the United States, his wife arranged for his burial in the cemetery of the religious kibbutz Tirat Zvi in northern Israel.
