= Strathavon =

- Location within Gauteng Location within South Africa
- Coordinates: 26.096°S 28.067°E
- Country: South Africa
- Province: Gauteng
- Municipality: City of Johannesburg
- Main Place: Sandton

Area
  - Total: 1.38 km^{2} (0.53 sq mi)

Population (2011)
  - Total: 3,297
  - Density: 2,390/km^{2} (6,190/sq mi)

Racial makeup (2011)
  - Black African: 30.1%
  - Coloured: 2.2%
  - Indian/Asian: 9.0%
  - White: 56.7%
  - Other: 2.1%

First languages (2011)
  - English: 69.5%
  - Afrikaans: 6.3%
  - Zulu: 5.6%
  - Tswana: 3.3%
  - Other: 15.2%
- Time zone: UTC+2 (SAST)
- Postal code (street): 2196
- PO box: 2031

Strathavon is a suburb of Johannesburg, South Africa. It is located in Region E of the City of Johannesburg Metropolitan Municipality. Strathavon is a sought after area due to its convenient location and close proximity to the Sandton CBD, and the M1 motorway. The Chabad movement has a centre in Strathavon.
