= Shlock Rock =

American-Israeli Jewish rock band

- Origin: United States
- Genres: Jewish rock; rock; pop
- Years active: 1985–present
- Members: Lenny Solomon; Assorted "Shlockers"
- Website: shlockrock.com

Shlock Rock is an American-Israeli Jewish rock band put together in December 1985 and officially founded in 1986, led by singer Lenny Solomon. The band parodies popular secular songs, substituting Jewish religious-themed lyrics. To date they have released 39 albums. Shlock Rock continues to record albums and perform live as of 2015, and to date has sold more than 200,000 CDs, tapes and DVDs in the contemporary Jewish rock arena. Their music is a mix of pop-rock song parodies and original rock songs in English and Hebrew. The stated purpose of the band is to spread Jewish pride, identity and awareness throughout the Jewish community, for Jewish continuity. Solomon and Shlock Rock tour around the world, playing at concerts, schools, and Jewish events. They are thought to be the only Jewish music band to play a concert in all 50 states.

== History ==
Logo

Prior to the band's formation, the term "shlock rock" had been used ironically in a "rock-and-roll glossary" and to describe shock rocker Alice Cooper. Solomon chose the band's name because "'Shlock' means secondhand, and half the music we play is secondhand rock with new words."

According to Solomon, in December 1985, Lenny and the band "rented the 39th Street Music studio in New York for two weeks from midnight to 8:00am as it was the only time slot they could afford." The first album by Shlock Rock was titled Learning is Good. It was released in January 1986.

The original Shlock Rock band consisted of Lenny Solomon (keyboards, vocals), Yonah Lloyd (guitar), Gary Wallin (drums), Mark Skier (bass), Mark Infield (saxophone, keyboards, percussion), and Danny Block (saxophone, violin). It has since gone on to include the "Jewish Rapper" Etan G, as well as Roy Weinberger on drums, Mo Shapiro on guitar and Rami Strosberg on saxophone. On tour, the band uses local musicians, except for Solomon and Etan G.

In March 2009, Shlock Rock released their 31st album, No Limits, online. It was offered in a pay-what-you-want format at a minimum download price of $1 for the twelve-song album. Customers who paid the retail price ($15), or more, also received the CD upon its release in December 2009. The album was recorded in Haworth, New Jersey. "I wrote twelve songs in four days from my house in Israel," Solomon stated, "I love these songs and want everyone to have them." The offer ran until March 28 (Passover of that year). The band released its official video for "Another Door Opens" from the album in July.

In 2011, the band released Shabbat in Liverpool, "adapting Shabbat services to the tunes of Lennon and McCartney."

A 2024 documentary about the band and its leader, The King of Shlock, won best short at Jerusalem's Maale Film School's festival. Though Solomon was absent for health reasons, the win was received by the crowd with cheers of "Keep on Shlockin'!" The film was featured at the 2025 Doc Aviv film festival. In the film, Jewish rapper Etan G. says Solomon belongs in the 'Mount Rushmore of Jewish music' with Mordechai Ben David, Avraham Fried, and Shlomo Carlebach.

== Musical style and hit songs ==
Shlock Rock parodies popular secular songs, substituting new, Jewish religious-themed lyrics for the originals, and is "best known for songs that educate and entertain through parody." According to Solomon, the band pays licensing fees to originators for every parody album, though it is unclear if this is legally required.

Hit songs include "We've Got a Strong Desire" (sung to the tune of Billy Joel's "We Didn't Start the Fire"), "Abarbanel" (sung to the tune of the Beach Boys' "Barbara Ann"), "Achashverosh" (sung to the tune of Falco's "Rock Me Amadeus"" (the Salieri Club Mix), and "My Bekeshe Needs Cleaning" (sung to the tune of the Mamas & the Papas' "California Dreamin'"). A 1990 original song, "Minyan Man", was described as Shlock Rock's "most enduring hit" and was later remade with the Maccabeats.

Other songs by Shlock Rock include:

- "Old Time Torah Scroll" to the tune of "Old Time Rock & Roll" by Bob Seger
- "Rashi" to the tune of "Windy" by the Association
- "Under the Chupah" to the tune of "Under the Boardwalk" by the Drifters
- "Sweet Aroma of the Challah" to the tune of "Sweet Home Alabama" by Lynyrd Skynyrd
- "Tshuvah" to the tune of "Good Lovin'" by the Rascals
- "(It's My Lulav, it's) All Shook Up" to the tune of "All Shook Up" by Elvis Presley
- "Hanukah Night's Alright for Lighting" to the tune of "Saturday Night's Alright for Fighting" by Elton John
- "All Night Long" to the tune of "All Night Long (All Night)" by Lionel Richie
- "Learning Is Good" to the tune of "Johnny B. Goode" by Chuck Berry
- "Havdalah" to the tune of "Ob-La-Di, Ob-La-Da" by the Beatles
- "My Menorah" to the tune "La Bamba" by Ritchie Valens
- "Amen" to the tune of "Cocaine" by JJ Cale (made famous by Eric Clapton)
- "Tefillah" to the tune of Thriller by Michael Jackson

(The following songs are from the Showtune-based album "Almost on Broadway")

- "Soup and Challah" to the tune of "Supercalifragilisticexpialidocious" from Mary Poppins
- "Tekiah" to the tune of "Maria" from West Side Story
- "Succot Nights" to the tune of "Summer Nights" from Grease
- "Come Round He's Makin' a Boat" to the tune of "Sit Down You're Rockin' the Boat" from Guys and Dolls
- "Gabbai of the Shul" to the tune of "Master of the House" from Les Misérables
- "Do You Know Your Hebrew Name" to the tune of "There Is Nothing Like a Dame" from South Musical
- "Bavel" to the tune of "Belle" from Beauty and the Beast
- "To Ma'ariv" to the tune of "Tomorrow" from Annie
- "Passed the Test" to the tune of "SOS" from Mamma Mia!
- "Get Me to the Shul on Time" to the tune of "Get Me to the Church on Time" from My Fair Lady
- "Hello Mohel, Hello Kvater" to the tune of "Hello Muddah, Hello Faddah" by Allan Sherman
- "Learning to Dance the Hora" to the tune of "Livin' la Vida Loca" by Ricky Martin

== Discography ==
Shlock Rock releases from 1986 to 2019 include 39 albums, 3 music video compilations and 1 songbook.

- Learning is Good (1986)
- Purim Torah (1987)
- Jewish Pride (1987)
- Emunah (1988)
- To Unite All Jews (1988)
- Songs of the Morning (1989)
- Lenny and the Shlockers (1990)
- Shlock Rock Videos, Volume 1 (1990)
- Sgt. Shlockers Magical History Tour (1991)
- Shlock Rock Videos Volume 2 (1992)
- The Kosher Police (1992)
- We're Coming Back (1992)
- Bring Back That Shabbos Feeling (1993)
- Manual For The Moral Minded (1994)
- Woodshlock (1995)
- Shlock Rock For Kids Volume 1 (1995)
- Shlock Rock Songbook (1996)
- Stories From the Holy Land (1997)
- Shlock Rock Greatest Hits Volume 1 – The Early Years 1986–1990
- Mikdash (1997)
- Shlock Rock For Kids Sing Together (1998)
- Menchville The Musical (1998)
- Shlock Rock Meets The Prophets (1999)
- Shlock Rock JMTV – Videos Volume 3 (2000)
- God Sent Us Email (2001)
- Rock Moshiach/Bitah Achishenah (2002)
- Almost on Broadway (2003)
- Tnu Lanu Siman/Give Us A Sign (2004)
- Shlock Rock For Kids Volume 3 We're In The Band (2005)
- J-Rap City – Shlock Rock Rap Compilation – Feat. Etan G November (2005)
- ReJewVenated (2006)
- Shlock Rock Music Videos (on DVD)
- Shlock Rock GH2 – Greatest Hits Volume 2 – 1991–1996
- Osher V'Osher (2008)
- Shlock Rock For Kids Party Time (2008)
- No Limits (2009)
- A Shabbat in Liverpool (2010)
- Kosher Cake (January 2012)
- Still Not Quite on Broadway (2012)
- Derech Haor (2012)
- Shlockapella (March 2015)
- Simchat Chayim (August 2016)
- "The Lenny Solomon Project" – Shira Yetaira (August 2018)
- Shlock Rock New Shul (March 2019)

== Bibliography ==
- Shlock Rock (1997). The Shlock Rock Songbook. Tara Publications. ISBN 978-0-933676-58-9.
- Retting, Nechama; Greenberg, Tobey (December 1, 2009). Morah, Morah Teach Me Torah. Torah Aura Productions. ISBN 978-1-934527-26-9. - Contributed lyrics for many Torah-related songs
