= Morningside Manor =

- Location within Gauteng Location within South Africa
- Coordinates: 26°03′59″S 28°04′27″E
- Country: South Africa
- Province: Gauteng
- Municipality: City of Johannesburg
- Main Place: Sandton

Area
  - Total: 1.59 km^{2} (0.61 sq mi)

Population (2011)
  - Total: 2,098
  - Density: 1,320/km^{2} (3,420/sq mi)

Racial makeup (2011)
  - Black African: 35.5%
  - Coloured: 2.7%
  - Indian/Asian: 8.3%
  - White: 50.1%
  - Other: 3.4%

First languages (2011)
  - English: 68.5%
  - Afrikaans: 6.0%
  - Zulu: 5.2%
  - Northern Sotho: 3.7%
  - Other: 16.6%
- Time zone: UTC+2 (SAST)
- Postal code (street): 2196
- PO box: 2057

Morningside Manor is a suburb of Johannesburg, South Africa. It is located in Johannesburg Region E.
