= The Maccabeats =

American Jewish singing group

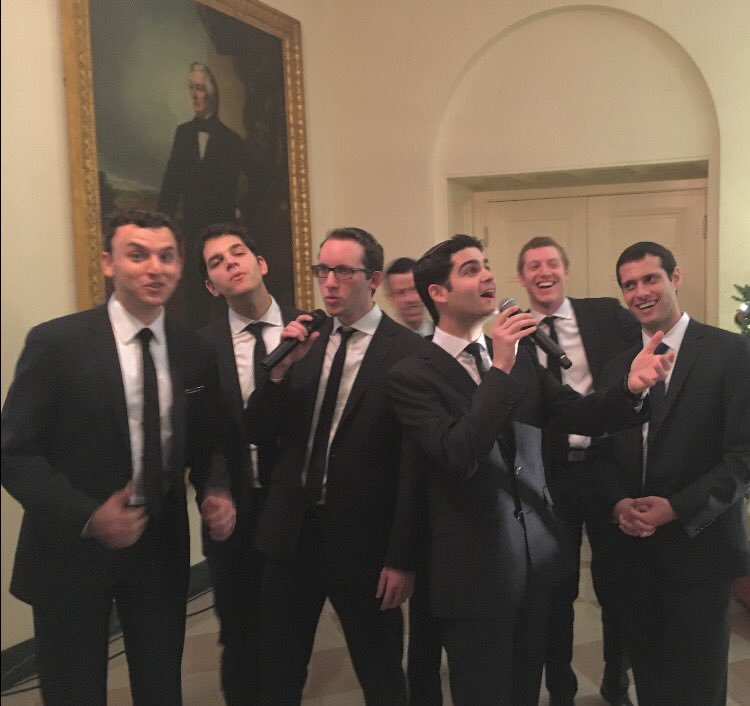
- The Maccabeats performing at the White House in 2015

Background information
- Origin: New York City
- Genres: A cappella, beatboxing, covers, parody
- Years active: 2007–present
- Members: Chanina Abramowitz; David Block; Michael Greenberg; Julian (Chaim) Horowitz; Noah "Noey" Jacobson; Joshua Jay; Nachum Joel; Ari Lewis; Mordechai Prus; Jeffrey Ritholtz; Buri Rosenberg; George Rubin; Yona Saperstein; Joey Senders; Immanuel Shalev; Meir Shapiro; Yonatan Shefa; Ely Shestack
- Website: www.maccabeats.com

The Maccabeats are an American Orthodox Jewish all-male a cappella group. Founded in 2007 at Yeshiva University, Manhattan, New York, the 14+ member group specializes in covers and parodies of hits using Jewish-themed lyrics. Their breakout 2010 Hanukkah music video for "Candlelight", a parody of Mike Tompkins' a cappella music video for Taio Cruz's "Dynamite", logged more than two million hits in its first ten days; the video has been viewed more than 17 million times as of 2025. They have recorded three albums and one EP, and frequently release music videos in conjunction with Jewish holidays. and have performed at the White House and the Knesset.

== History ==
The Maccabeats were founded in 2007 at Yeshiva University in Manhattan. The group adapted their name from that of the university's sports teams, "The Maccabees". The original group was composed of full-time undergraduate students, many of them alumni of Bnei Akiva North America. The group sang together privately for the first year, developing their repertoire, and then began appearing at campus events. They eventually hired themselves out to perform at bar mitzvahs, weddings, and other events in the New York Orthodox Jewish community.

The Maccabeats released their first album, Voices from the Heights, in March 2010. This album, funded by a grant from the university, sold about 5,000 copies. In November 2010, they released "Candlelight", a Hanukkah-themed cover of Taio Cruz's "Dynamite" with a music video directed by Uri Westrich, a Yeshiva University graduate. The video, a parody of Mike Tompkins' a cappella music video for "Dynamite", was intended for the group's target audience in the New York Orthodox Jewish community but it quickly went viral, being viewed more than 2 million times in ten days. As of December 2018, it had logged more than 14 million views. The song entered Billboard's Comedy Digital Tracks chart at #2 and the Billboard Holiday Digital Songs chart at #19. That same month, the song rose to #1 on the Comedy Digital Tracks chart.

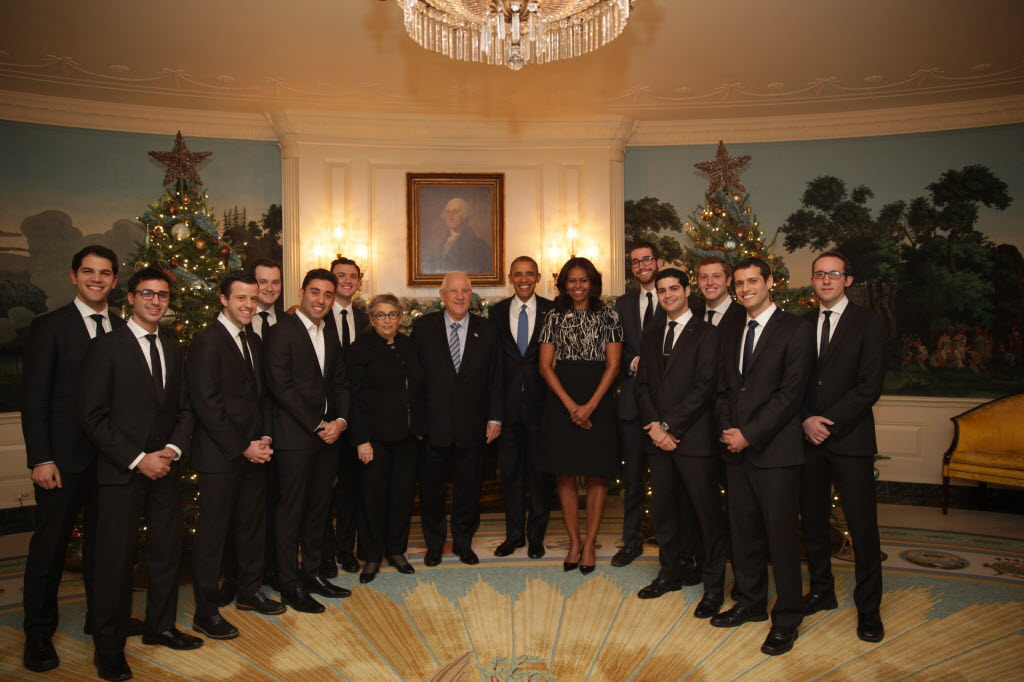
The Maccabeats with United States President Barack Obama and First Lady Michelle Obama, Israeli President Reuven Rivlin and First Lady Nechama Rivlin, in the White House in December 2015

As a result of the video, The Maccabeats received major media coverage and requests for bookings nationwide. In January 2011 they performed at the Knesset. On May 17, 2011, they were invited to sing at the White House's Jewish American Heritage Month gala. President Barack Obama commended "their outstanding performance", in which they performed a barbershop quartet. The Maccabeats returned to the White House on December 9, 2015 to perform at the afternoon reception of the White House Hanukkah Party.

The Maccabeats have attracted both Jewish and non-Jewish fans via the Internet and on tour. In addition to the United States, they have performed in China, New Zealand, Hong Kong, Mexico, Chile, South Africa, London, and Italy. Members of the group lead Shabbat synagogue services for host communities.

As of 2018, the group is no longer officially affiliated with Yeshiva University.

== Holiday songs ==
The Maccabeats are best known for their Jewish holiday songs. These cover and parody contemporary hits while adding original lyrics written by group members. The lyrics are often educational, recounting the history of the holiday, mentioning pertinent symbols and customs, and using Hebrew phrases known to Jewish celebrants.

=== Hanukkah ===
Since 2010, the group has produced an annual Hanukkah music video. These include a cover of Matisyahu's "Miracle" (2011), with self-professed fan and Orthodox Jewish actress Mayim Bialik and her two sons appearing in the music video; "All About That Neis" (2014), a parody of Meghan Trainor's "All About That Bass", and "Latke Recipe" (2015), a parody of "Shut Up and Dance" by Walk the Moon.

For Hanukkah 2016, the group produced a musical theatre parody called "Hasmonean: A Hamilton Hanukkah", featuring songs and music based on the musical Hamilton, rewritten with a Hanukkah theme. The video covers the songs "Alexander Hamilton" (with changed lyrics referring to the Hanukkah hero Judah Maccabee), "You'll Be Back", "My Shot", and "The Story of Tonight".

For Hanukkah 2017, the group released a music video marking the 10th anniversary since their formation. The holiday-themed song, "Candles on the Sill", parodied Ed Sheeran's 2017 release, "Castle on the Hill".

For Hanukkah 2018, the group released "I Have a Little Dreidel", a cover of the famous "I Have a Little Dreidel" tune, sung using the methods of various musical genres. The lyrics were slightly modified in each genre, to better fit the theme. Musical genres included in this video are big band, bluegrass, hip hop, the 80's, blues, classical, reggaetón, and gospel.

Since 2019, the group has gone back to releasing annual parody videos, including "Pan Fry" (2019), a parody of Billy Eilish's "Bad Guy" and Lil Nas X's "Old Town Road", "Candlelight 2020" (2020), a parody of BTS's "Dynamite", and "Illuminating" (2021), a parody of Dua Lipa's "Levitating".

=== Purim ===
"Purim Song" (2011) covers Pink's "Raise Your Glass". "Purim Song" charted in the top 10 of Billboard's Comedy Digital Songs.

"An Encanto Purim (We Don't Talk About Haman)" (2022) covers Encanto's "We Don't Talk About Bruno" and "Surface Pressure".

=== Passover ===
A 2013 music video featured a medley of songs from the musical Les Misérables, performed over reenactments of scenes from the Passover story. The video included covers of "Work Song" (over a reenactment of the Jews' lives as slaves in Egypt), "At the End of the Day" (Jochebed putting the baby Moses in a basket in the Nile), "I Dreamed a Dream", "Who Am I?" (Moses questioning if he is worthy to lead the Jews out of Egypt), the Thénardiers' section and the students' section of "One Day More" (the Ten Plagues and Moses speaking to Pharaoh), and the finale of "Do You Hear the People Sing?".

A 2015 Passover mashup of "Dayenu" included eight different musical motifs, including doo-wop, polka, heavy metal, funk, hip-hop, "island", dubstep, and barbershop quartet.

The 2016 Passover mashup included parodies of Justin Bieber's "Love Yourself", "Sorry" and "What Do You Mean?".

=== Sukkot ===
In 2012 The Maccabeats released a video parody of Psy's "Gangnam Style" titled, "What's next? Sukkos Style?"

== Other covers ==
The group has also covered Leonard Cohen's "Hallelujah", incorporating the Hebrew lyrics of "Lekha Dodi"; Anna Kendrick's "Cups", set to the Shabbat morning table song "D'ror Yikra"; Ellie Goulding's "Burn"; and Sara Bareilles' "Brave". Their 2014 music video mashup "Home", filmed in New York and Jerusalem, covers songs by One Direction, Andy Grammer, Chris Daughtry, and Phillip Phillips.

In January 2016 the group covered James Taylor's "Shed a Little Light" in a joint performance with beatboxing vocal group Naturally 7 in commemoration of Martin Luther King Jr. Day. The music video was filmed at the Lincoln Memorial in Washington, D.C., where King delivered his "I Have a Dream" speech. Taylor called the performance "one of the best covers of 'Shed a Little Light' I've ever heard".

In September 2020 the group released a COVID-19 lockdown-themed music video in which they covered the traditional Rosh Hashana song "BaShana HaBa'a" with additional original English-language lyrics. The members were individually filmed in their homes accompanied by their young children.

== Original songs ==
For Hanukkah 2012, the Maccabeats released their first original song, "Shine". "Hanerot Hallalu" ("These Candles") is their bluegrass-inspired rendition of the hymn traditionally sung after lighting the Hanukkah candles. In June 2020 four members of the group released the song "Say Your Name" in honor of African-American police victim George Floyd. On December 3, 2023, the Maccabeats released "We're Still Here (Am Yisrael Chai)" to honor Israel's response to the October 7, 2023 terror attack. The song was written by Noah Jacobson and its video includes footage from the band's performance at the November, 2023 March for Israel in Washington, D.C.

== Music style ==
While performing a range of musical styles, the Maccabeats' performance is strictly vocal. Members do beatboxing to imitate synthesizer, drums, and other instruments.

== Personnel ==
Founding member Julian (Chaim) Horowitz is The Maccabeats' musical director and manager. The group was initially composed of undergraduate students, but by 2012 all members were in graduate school, most of them pursuing studies in fields other than music. Members have continued with the group after entering a profession, marrying, and moving out of New York. While all the members practice together weekly, only half the group travels to live performances, as their music is arranged in seven- and eight-part harmony.

Music video director Uri Westrich is a Yeshiva University graduate. Following the success of his 2010 video for "Candlelight", he left medical school to pursue a career in filmmaking. He has directed all of The Maccabeats' music videos.

The Maccabeats have a "clean-cut" look, performing in white dress shirts, skinny black ties, dress slacks, and knit yarmulkes. In keeping with the philosophical tenets of Yeshiva University, the group sees its mission as a fulfillment of Torah Umadda (Torah and secular knowledge). In the words of group member Ari Lewis, the group embraces the ideal of "living a life of Torah and Judaism, and simultaneously a successful secular life".

== Associated acts ==
In 2012 four members of The Maccabeats – David Block, Noey Jacobson, Nachum Joel, and Immanuel Shalev – formed the short-lived a cappella group StandFour. In 2014 Jacobson launched a solo career, while still performing with The Maccabeats.

== Discography ==
=== Albums ===
- Voices from the Heights (2010)
- Out of the Box (2012)
- One Day More (2014)
- Hanukkah Anthology (2020)

=== EPs ===
- A Maccabeats Hanukkah (2015)

== See also ==
- StandFour
