= Music of Portugal =

Portuguese music includes many different styles and genres, as a result of its history. These can be broadly divided into classical music, traditional/folk music and popular music and all of them have produced internationally successful acts, with the country seeing a recent expansion in musical styles, especially in popular musi still the most recognizable Portuguese name in music, and with more recent acts, like Dulce Pontes and Mariza.

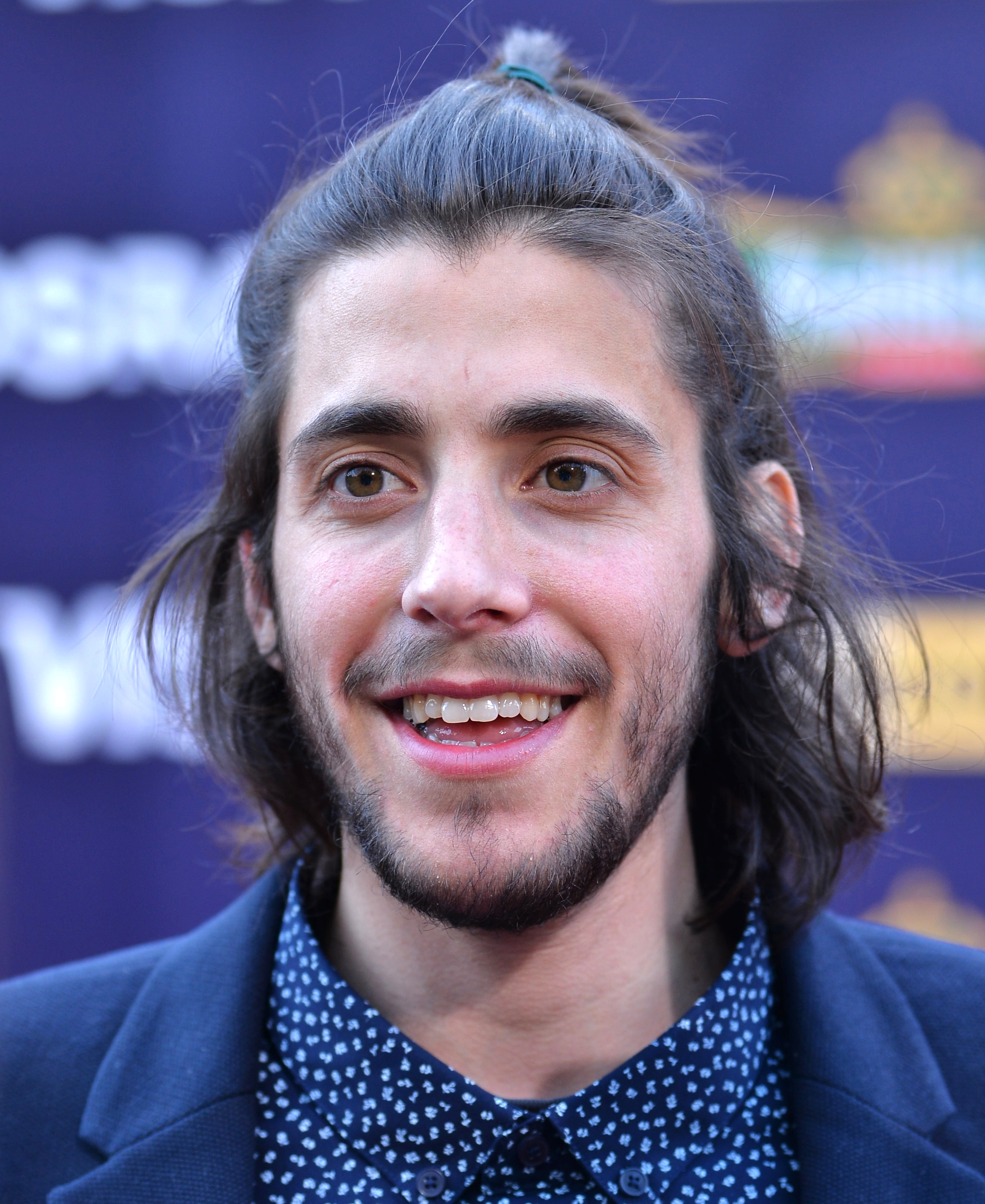
Barcelona-based Portuguese singer Salvador Sobral, winner of Eurovision 2017

In popular music, there is a significant number of popular genres. These include rock, with popular acts including Xutos & Pontapés, The Gift (alternative rock), Fingertips (pop rock), Blasted Mechanism (experimental electro-rock), Noctivagus (gothic rock) and Wraygunn (rock, blues). Also hip-hop, with acts such as Boss AC, Da Weasel, Ithaka, Mind Da Gap and Sam the Kid. Acts such as Moonspell and Heavenwood (metal) and Buraka Som Sistema (electro/kuduro/breakbeat) have had significant international success. Other popular modern genres in Portugal include dance, house, kizomba, pimba, pop, reggae, ska and zouk.

== History ==
Portugal has had a history of receiving different musical influences from around the Mediterranean Sea, across Europe and former colonies. In the two centuries before the Christian era, Ancient Rome brought with it Greek influences; early Christians, who had their differing versions of church music arrived during the height of the Roman Empire; the Visigoths, a Romanized Germanic people, who took control of the Iberian Peninsula following the fall of the Roman Empire; the Moors and Jews in the Middle Ages. Hence, there have been more than two thousand years of internal and external influences and developments. Its genres range from classical to popular music. Portugal's music history includes musical history from the medieval Gregorian chants through Carlos Seixas' symphonies era to the composers of the modern era. The musical history of Portugal can be divided in different ways. Portuguese music encompasses musical production of the Middle Ages, Renaissance, Baroque, Classical, Romantic and Modern eras, especially from Angola with Kizomba. Portugal has very good dancing clothes making Portuguese dancing famous.

== Classical music ==
Portuguese music gets its rich history from its privileged geographical location. These are evidenced in the music history of Portugal, which despite its firm European roots, nevertheless reflects the intercontinental cultural interactions begun in the Portuguese discoveries.

A short list of past and present Portuguese musicians with important contributions must necessarily include the names of composers Manuel Cardoso, Duarte Lobo, Filipe de Magalhães, Carlos Seixas, Pedro de Escobar, Diogo Dias Melgás, João Domingos Bomtempo, Marcos Portugal, José Vianna da Motta, Luís de Freitas Branco, António Fragoso, Joly Braga Santos, Fernando Lopes-Graça, and Emmanuel Nunes; organists such as António Carreira and Manuel Rodrigues Coelho; singers Luísa Todi, Elisabete Matos and José Carlos Xavier; pianists Maria João Pires and Sequeira Costa; violinists Elmar Oliveira and Carlos Damas; and cellists such as Guilhermina Suggia.

== Traditional music ==
=== Fado ===
Fado is a musical style, which arose in Lisbon as the music of the urban poor. Fado songs are typically lyrically harsh, accompanied by a wire-strung acoustic guitar or the Portuguese Guitar. It is usually sung by solo performers, with the singer resigned to sadness, poverty, and loneliness, but remaining dignified and firmly controlled. It is claimed that fado's origins are older, going back to the 15th century, when women cried with longing for their husbands that sailed to the never-ending seas.

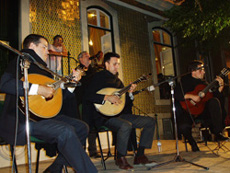
Fado group Verdes Anos (Coimbra fado)

Late in the 19th century, the city of Coimbra developed a distinctive scene. Coimbra, a literary capital for the country, is now known for being more refined and majestic. The sound has been described as "the song of those who retain and cherish their illusions, not of those who have irretrievably lost them" by Rodney Gallop in 1936. A related form is the guitarradas of the 1920s and 30s, best known for Dr. Antonio Menano and a group of virtuoso musicians he formed, including Artur Paredes and José Joaquim Cavalheiro. Student fado, performed by students at Coimbra University, has maintained a tradition since it was pioneered in the 1890s by Augusto Hilário.

Starting in 1939 with the career of Amália Rodrigues, fado was an internationally popular genre. A singer and film actress, Rodrigues made numerous stylistic innovations that have made her probably the most influential fadista of all time.

A new generation of musicians have contributed to the social and political revival of fado music, adapting and blending it with new trends. Contemporary fado musicians of note include Carminho, Mariza, Mísia and Camané. Notable female fadistas (fado singers) include Maria Ana Bobone, Cuca Roseta, Cristina Branco, Ana Moura, Katia Guerreiro, and Mariza. Mísia, Carlos do Carmo, Ricardo Ribeiro and Miguel Capucho are also well-known fado singers.

It was included in the UNESCO Intangible Cultural Heritage Lists in 2011.

=== Regional folk music ===
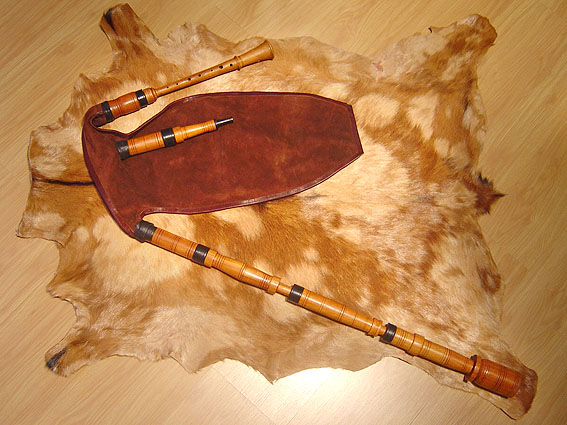
Transmontana Bagpipe

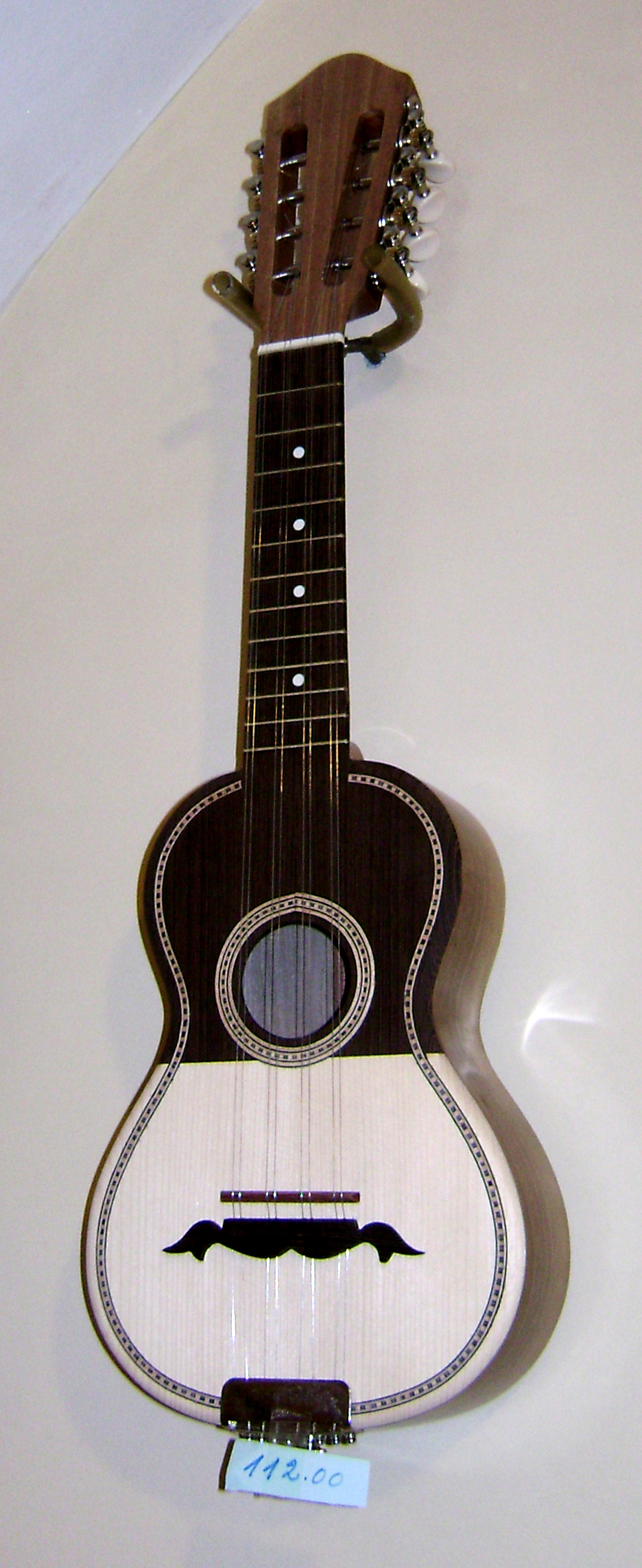
The Portuguese musical instrument Cavaquinho used in traditional music

Recent events have helped keep Portuguese regional folk (rancho folclórico) traditions alive, most especially including the worldwide roots revival of the 1960s and 70s.

Cante Alentejano, from the Alentejo region, was included in the UNESCO Intangible Cultural Heritage Lists in 2014.

The people of the Azores islands maintain some distinct musical traditions, such as the traditionally fiddle-driven chamarrita dance.

Music in Madeira is widespread and mainly uses local musical instruments such as the Machete, rajao, Brinquinho and Cavaquinho, which are used in traditional Folklore dances like the Bailinho da Madeira. One of the island's most celebrated folklorists was Maria Ascensão (1926–2001). Famous performers of contemporary music include Max, Luís Jardim and Vânia Fernandes.

Trás-os-Montes' musical heritage is closely related to the traditional music of Galicia, Cantabria and Asturias. Traditional bagpipes (gaita-de-fole transmontana), a cappella vocals and a unique musical scale with equal semitones have kept alive a vital tradition. (Miranda de I Douro), some artists such as Galamdum Galundaina sing in Mirandese language. Also, the Pauliteiros folk dance is popular. Some residents sing in both Portuguese and Mirandese.

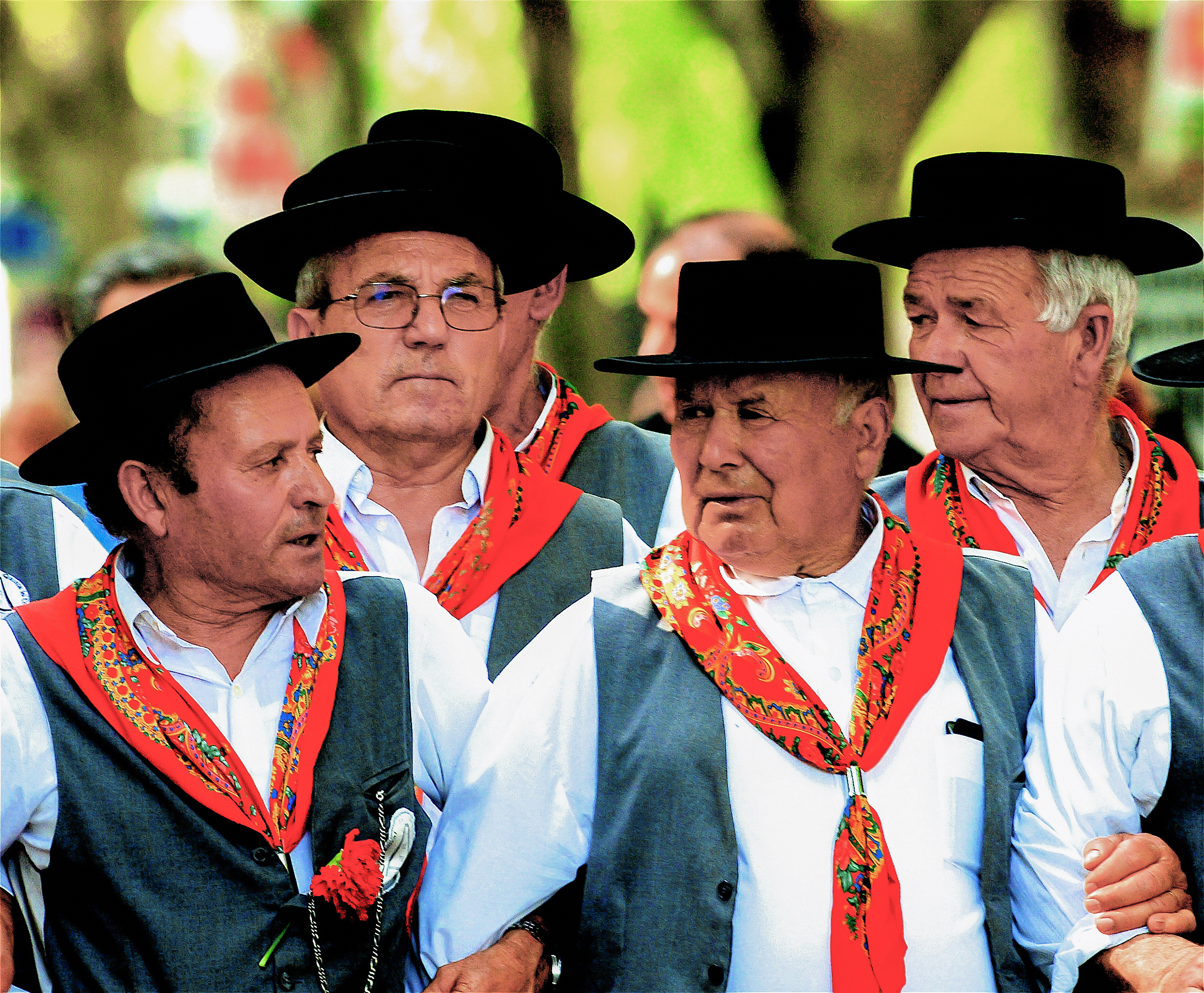
A group of Cante Alentejano

Folk/traditional music acts include: Dazkarieh, Cornalusa, Gaitúlia, Strella do Dia, Fausto, Notas e Voltas, Roberto Leal, Ronda dos Quatro Caminhos, Terra a Terra, Tonicha, Cândida Branca Flor, Óióai, Janita Salomé, Uxukalhus, Frei Fado D'el Rei, Gaiteiros de Lisboa, Roncos do Diabo, Dâna, Luís Peixoto, Dulce Pontes, Sangre Cavallum, Teresa Salgueiro, Vitorino and Xaile.

== Pop music ==
Famous artists and bands included in the past are José Afonso, Fausto Bordalo Dias, José Mário Branco, Manuel Freire, Cândida Branca Flor, Tonicha, Paco Bandeira, Clã, Paulo de Carvalho, José Cid, Linda de Suza, Madalena Iglésias, António Variações, Duo Ouro Negro, Roberto Leal (singer), Peste & Sida and Ornatos Violeta. Nowadays some of the most popular acts are Virgem Suta, HMB, Aurea, Amor Electro, GNR, Xutos & Pontapés, The Gift, David Fonseca, Diogo Piçarra, Os Quatro e Meia and Capitão Fausto. Portugal has been participating in the Eurovision Song Contest since 1964; its best result before 2017 was the 6th place achieved by Lucia Moniz's folk inspired song "O meu coração não tem cor" in 1996, penned by Pedro Vaz Osorio. Portugal gained no further Top 10 place until Salvador Sobral's first place in the 2017 contest with the song Amar Pelos Dois, which gained a record 758 points.

=== Folk-pop ===
In 2019, contemporary folk singer-songwriter Ana Mariano from Aveiro was featured on the compilation Novos Talentos FNAC 2019 (New Talents of Fnac 2019) with her Folk-pop debut single "Ordinary View", (written and performed in the English language.) In February 2020, she released her debut e.p. Everything I Touch which included the songs, "Insomnia" and "Plastic Wings" (featuring Ithaka), among others.

=== Electronic music ===
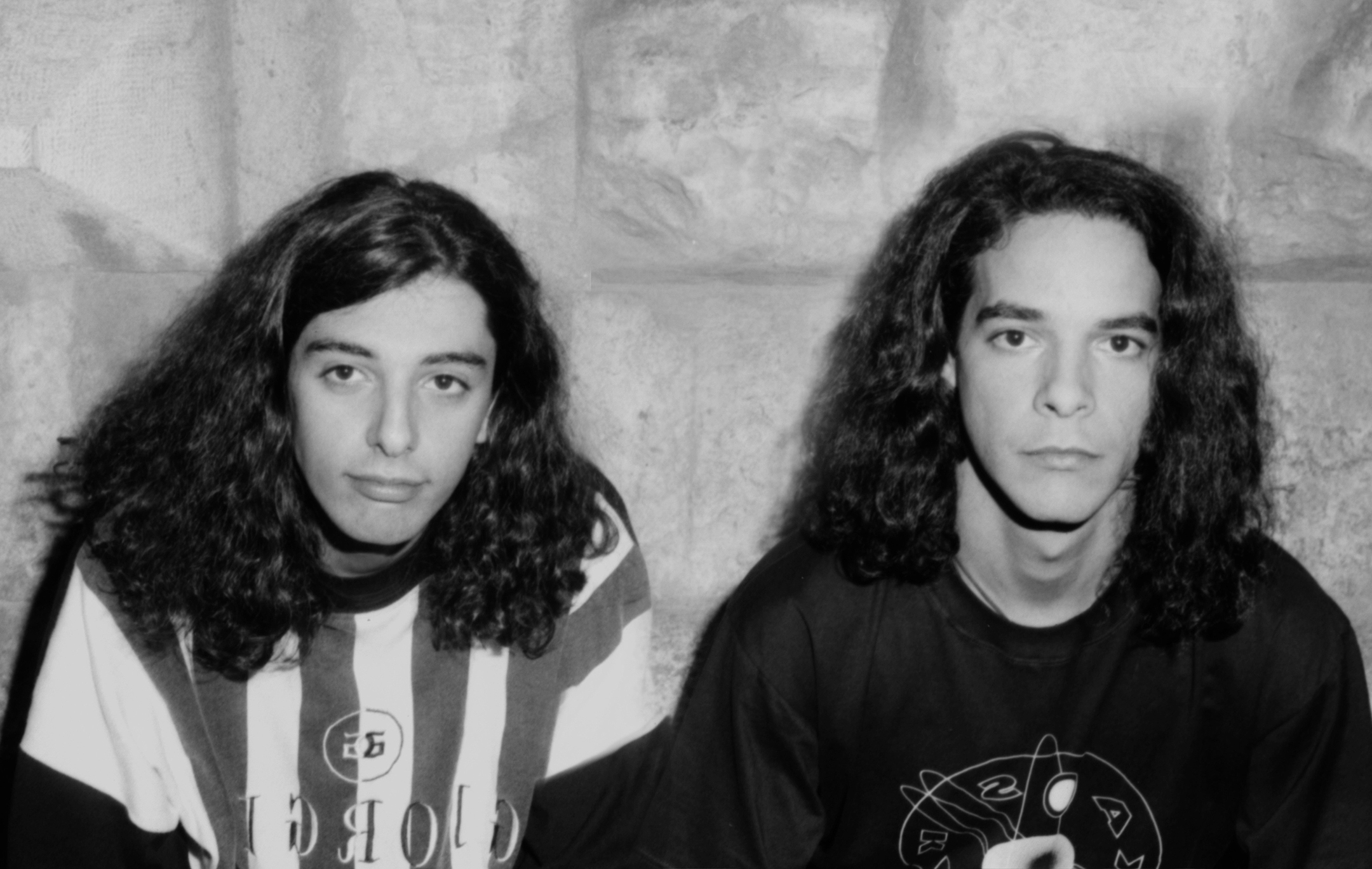
Underground Sound of Lisbon in 1994

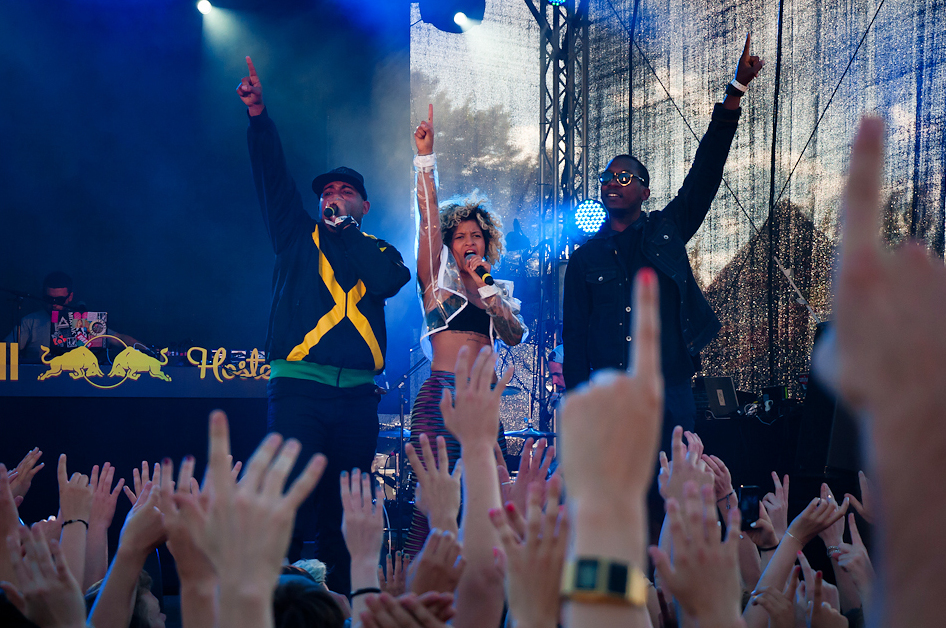
Buraka Som Sistema

In electronica, Underground Sound of Lisbon with their 1994 progressive house remix of the 1992 spoken word song So Get Up by Ithaka Darin Pappas (lyrics/vocals), was a musical project that brought international attention to Portuguese DJs, namely Rui da Silva (the only Portuguese musician to reach #1 on the UK charts), DJ Vibe, Pete tha Zouk and Yen Sung.

Some other names in the genre are Buraka Som Sistema, Branko, Sensible Soccers, Conan Osiris, Micro Audio Waves and KURA, with this last one being the highest-ranked Portuguese of all time on the annual's Top 100 Dj's by Dj Mag. In Porto, hometown of acts such as Nuno Forte, Drum n' Bass styles are popular, and the city has hosted various international names in the genre including Noisia and The Panacea. In the Psychedelic Trance genre there is a worldwide famous project: Paranormal Attack.

In February 2020, internationally recognized DJ-producer-musician, Armando Mendes, from northern Portugal released Parallel Universe on cd and a double-vinyl 12" set for Turquoise Records (one of the only full-length albums by any Portuguese electronic artist), collaborating with several worldwide vocalists/lyricists.

=== Experimental and avantgarde ===
Portuguese music has a striving experimental underground music scene since the '80s, with some exponents attaining international attention. Notable groups and musicians in this genre are Osso Exótico, Ocaso Épico, Telectu, Carlos Zíngaro, Pedro INF, Favela Discos, If Lucy Fell.

=== Heavy metal ===
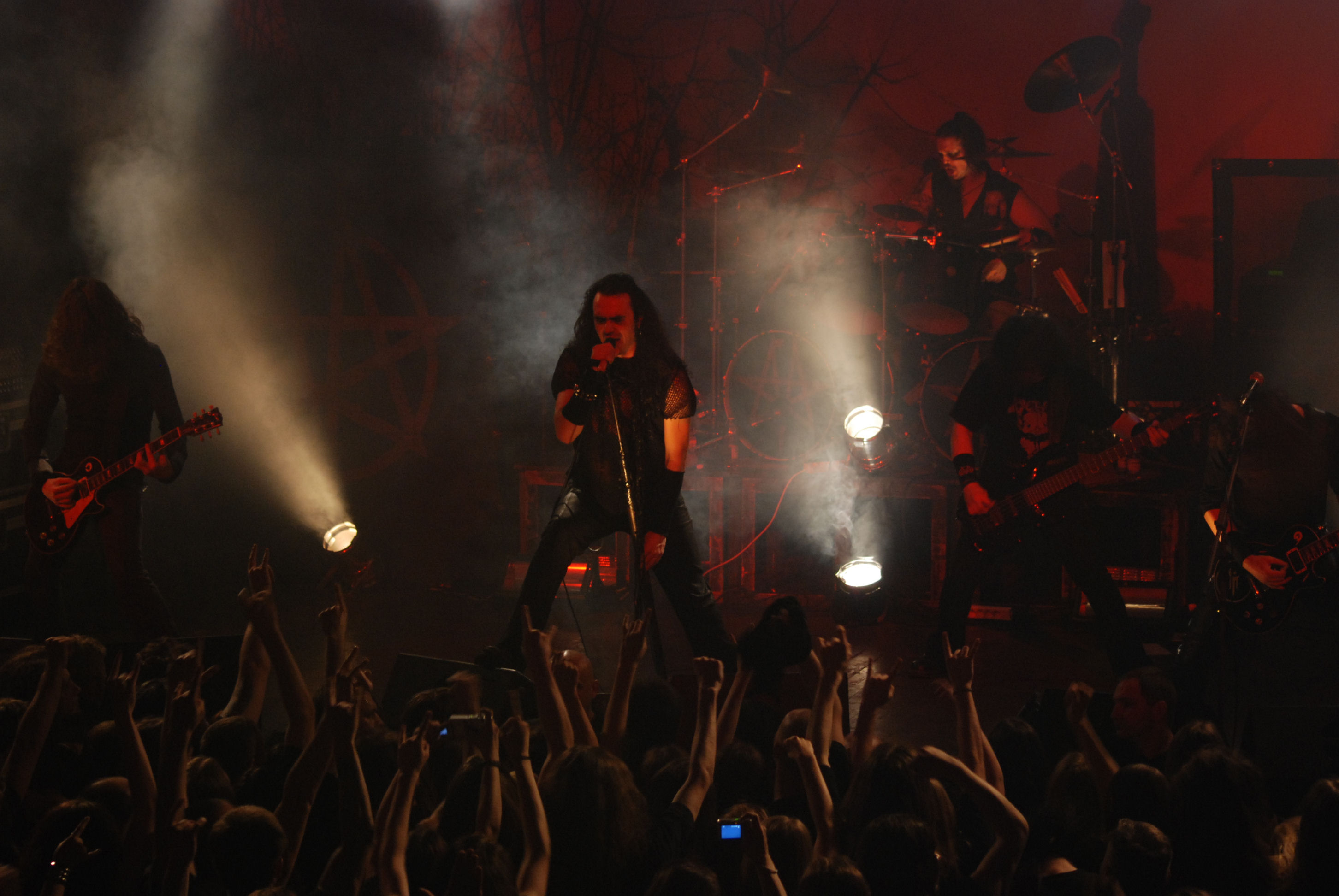
Moonspell live in Kraków, Poland in 2007

The biggest exponent of heavy metal music in Portugal are the bands Moonspell, Ava Inferi, Ramp, Heavenwood, Corpus Christii, Reaktor, W.C. Noise, Tarantula and Attick Demons, which have achieved international recognition, and have signed record deals with some of the most important international Heavy Metal Labels such as Century Media and Napalm Records for Moonspell, Massacre Records and Listenable Records for Heavenwood, Season of Mist for Ava Inferi, Pure Steel Records for Attick Demons, Candlelight Records for Corpus Christii, Nuclear Blast Records for Reaktor and AFM Records for Tarantula.

Heavy metal made by Portuguese bands is sold in all major records / music shops in all European countries such as Finland, Germany, the Netherlands, Italy, France, Poland and Turkey. Moonspell, Heavenwood and Attick Demons achieved markets such as East Europe / Russia, Asia, North, and South America, furthermore Attick Demons achieved recognition in Japan by being the only Portuguese heavy metal band to have a Japanese release to date, through a Japanese label.

Others bands like Miss Lava, Holocausto Canibal, Thirdsphere, Sirius, Sacred Sin, Factory of Dreams, Decayed, Filli Nigratium Infernallium, Morte Incandescente, Gwydion, Switchtense, Grog, Bizarra Locomotiva, Thee Orakle, More Than a Thousand and Oratory also achieved some international recognition.

=== Hip hop ===
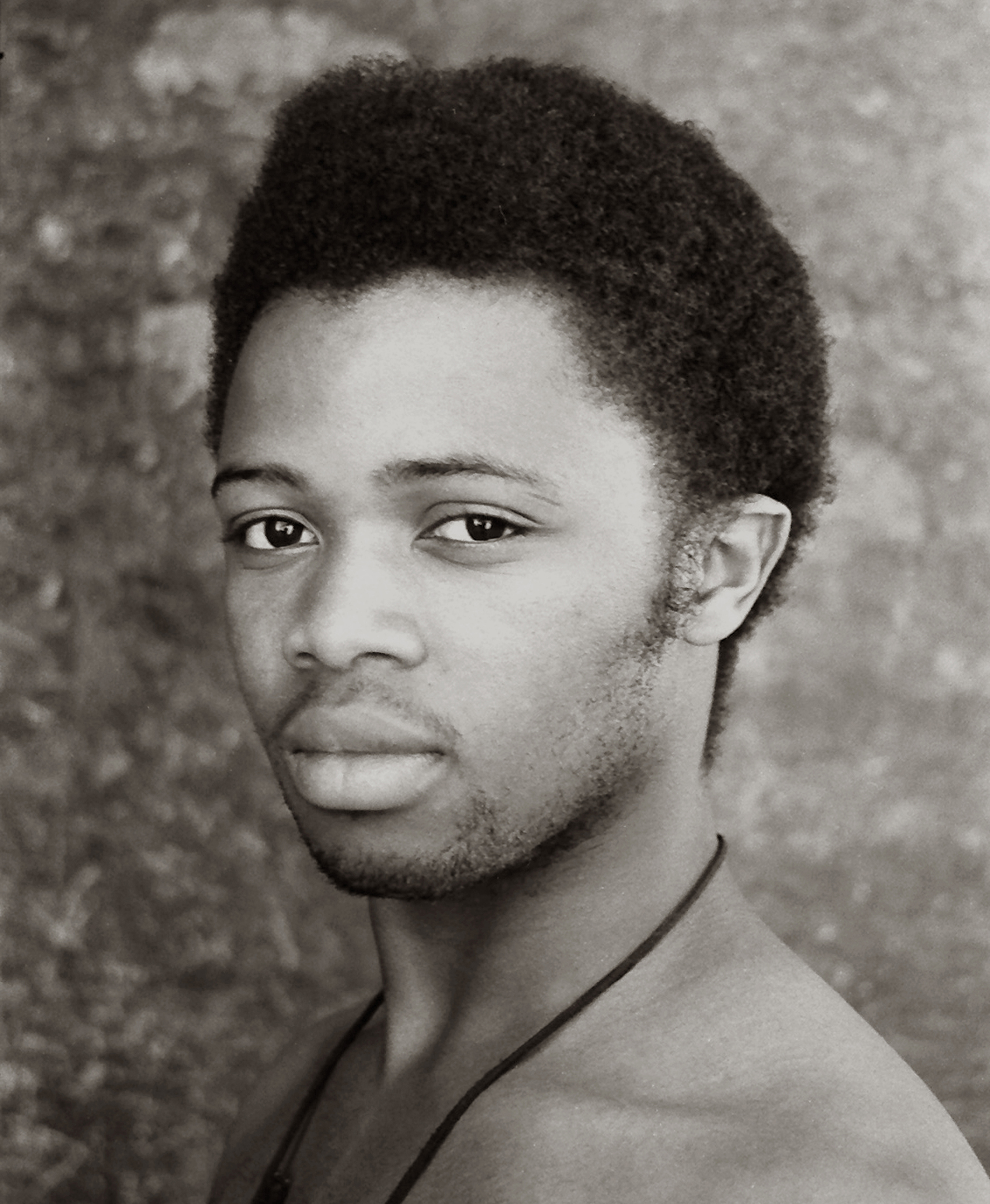
General D, The Godfather of Portuguese hip hop, in Lisbon 1993 (photo by Ithaka)

Hip hop began in Portugal in the early 1990s. The first artist to sign a major record deal was General D with EMI Records. Other important artists from the Hip hop tuga genre include; Sam the Kid, Slow J, Papillon, Da Weasel, Dealema, Valete, Regula, Boss AC, Mind the Gap, Bob Da Rage Sense, Dillaz.

=== Jazz ===
People such as Mário Barreiros, Mário Laginha, Carlos Barretto, Carlos Bica, João Paulo Esteves da Silva, António Pinho Vargas and the singer Maria João have careers in the field, despite experimenting, sometimes with success, other genres of music, and a more recent generation is following their footsteps, including the pianist Bernardo Sassetti, Júlio Resende, Carlos Bica, João Paulo, and the singers Salvador Sobral, João Barradas, Jacinta, Vânia Fernandes and Luísa Sobral.

=== Latin ===
Although it is an Iberian country, Portugal never had clear influences from Latin America, though Portuguese musical traditions have had an influence on Latin American music, particularly in Brazil and through instruments such as the cavaquinho and its descendent instruments like the cuatro. Nonetheless, the Latin music industry sometimes includes music sung in Portuguese from Portugal. This style came to the country in the 1990s, following a Spanish and world trend. Examples of Latin music singers in Portuguese are Ana Malhoa and Mil i Maria. The Latin Academy of Recording Arts & Sciences, the organization responsible for the Latin Grammy Awards, encompasses music from Portugal and has voting members who live in the country. Carlos do Carmo became the first Portuguese artist to win a Latin Grammy award upon receiving the Lifetime Achievement Award.

=== Pimba ===
Pimba music is the Portuguese version of the euro Schlager or the Balkan Turbo-Folk. It is named after the 1995 hit Pimba Pimba, by Emanuel. Some of its biggest names are Emanuel, Ágata, Suzana, Micaela, Ruth Marlene and Quim Barreiros. This genre mixes traditional sounds with accordion, Latin beats and funny or religious (mainly kitch) lyrics.

=== Folk and political (Música de Intervenção) ===
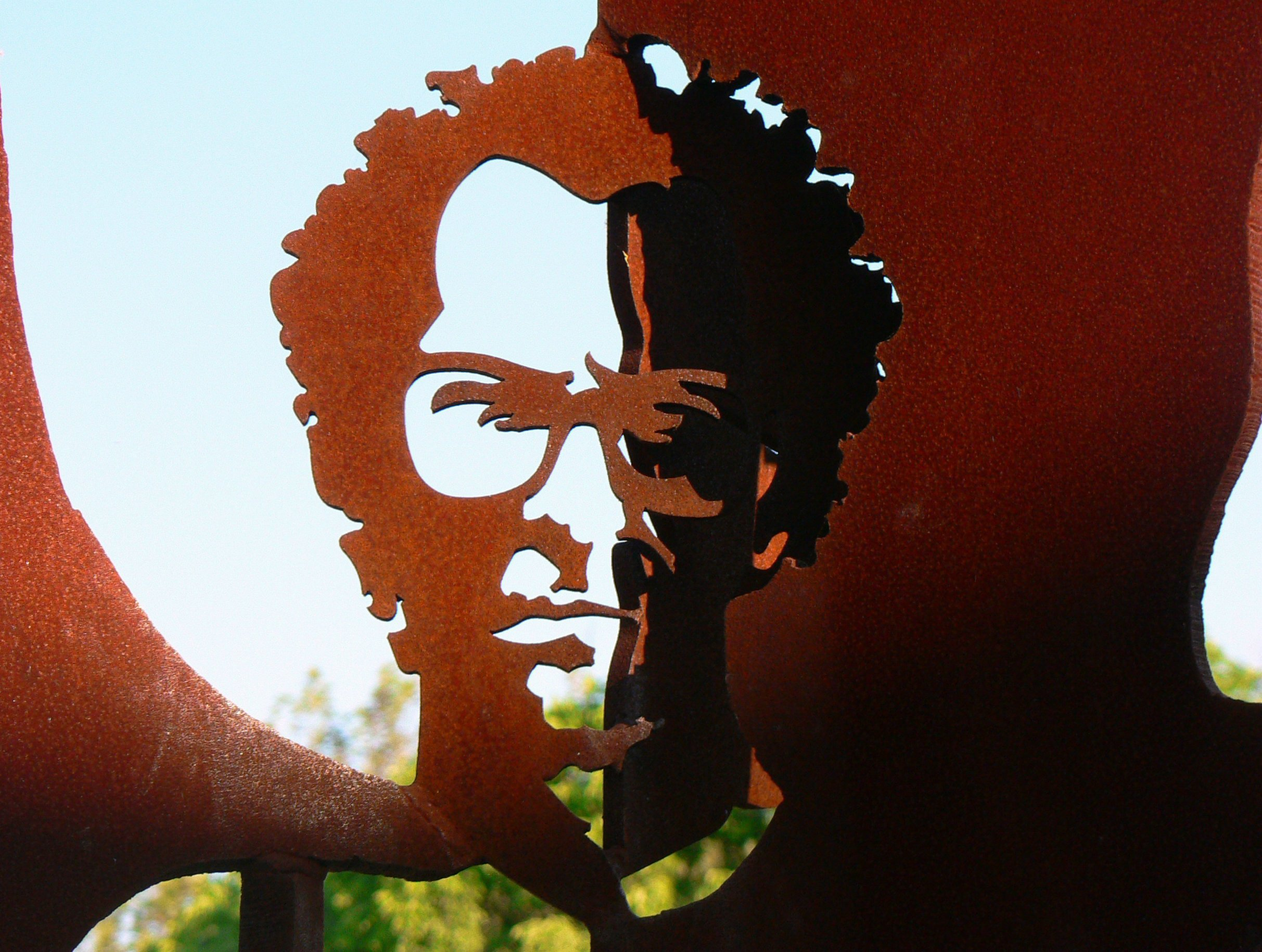
Sculpture of José Afonso in Grândola

During the Estado Novo authoritarian regime, music was widely used by the left-wing resistance as a way to say what could not be said, singing about freedom, equality, and democracy, mainly through metaphors and symbols. Many composers and singers became famous and persecuted by the political police, some of them being arrested or exiled, such as José Afonso, Paulo de Carvalho, José Mário Branco, Sérgio Godinho, Adriano Correia de Oliveira, Manuel Freire, Pedro Barroso, Fausto, Vitorino, Júlio Pereira and some others. Their music was (and remains) mostly based on Portuguese folk music and elements of European-style singer-songwriter genres.

José Afonso began performing in the 1950s; he was a popular roots-based musician that led the Portuguese roots revival. With artists like Sérgio Godinho and Luís Cília, Afonso helped form nova canção music, which, after the 1974 revolution, gained socially-aware lyrics and became canto livre. The biggest names in canto livre were Banda do Casaco and Brigada Víctor Jara, groups that seriously studied and were influenced by Portuguese regional music. The poet-singer-songwriter was also a significant contributor to the modern romance genre, can be compared to Leonard Cohen.

After the Carnation Revolution, that same music was used to support left-wing parties. Political ideas and causes, like the agrarian reform, socialism, equality, democratic elections, free education and many other were a constant presence in these songs lyrics, often written by well-known poets like José Barata-Moura, Manuel Alegre or Ary dos Santos.

=== Reggae and ska ===
More underground but very prominent are Portuguese reggae and ska. Unregarding some 2 Tone and reggae-influenced singles in the late 70s by bands like Roquivários or early 80s mod outfit Táxi, it was only in the early 1990s when the first Portuguese roots reggae band, Kussondulola reached the mainstream public.

Best known Portuguese reggae singers include Richie Campbell, Mercado Negro, Prince Wadada and Freddy Locks, while some of the more famous bands of these types include Terrakota, Primitive Reason, Sativa, One Sun Tribe, One Love Family, Arsha, Three and a Quarter, Purocracy, Chapa Dux and Souls of Fire. This music is popular among young people, with its main roots based in Lisbon and the surrounding areas.

Earlier ska bands in Portugal included Despe&Siga and Contratempos, while The Ratazanas can be considered the best known Portuguese Early reggae and Rocksteady band. They recorded for German label Grover Records and toured throughout Europe on their own right as well as backing Jamaican singers like Susan Cadogan. Skarmiento, Skalibans, and Skamioneta do Lixo are other Portuguese ska bands.

=== Rock ===
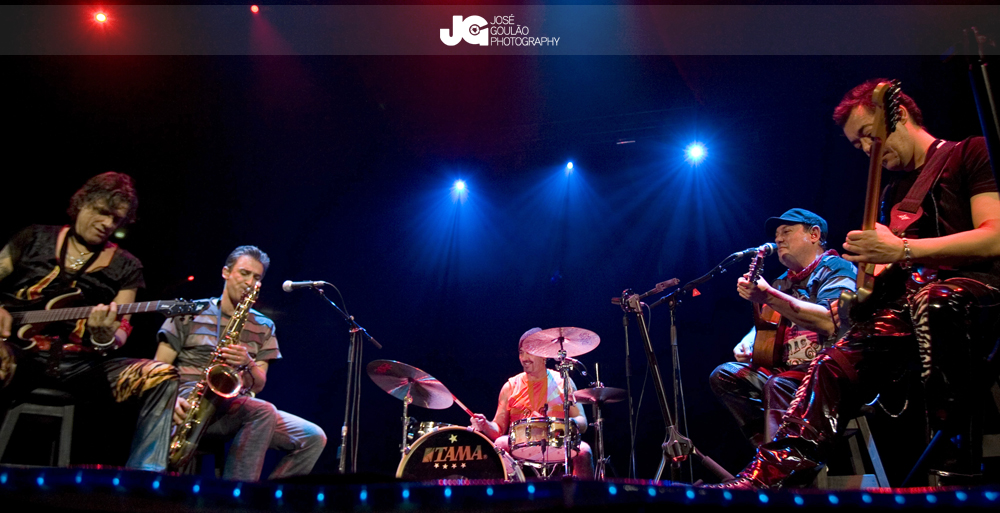
Xutos & Pontapés

Portuguese rock was born in the 1980s, with acts like Rui Veloso and Jorge Palma. Examples of popular Portuguese rock bands, having a long history, are Xutos & Pontapés and UHF who have been playing for over 30 years and are known widely throughout Portugal, as well as Mão Morta, a unique and controversial Portuguese band with decades-long activity. Well known solo singers include Rui Veloso, Jorge Palma, and Pedro Abrunhosa. Clã (pop rock), Grupo Novo Rock (pop rock and rock), Fingertips, (pop rock), Blasted Mechanism (electro-rock and dub/reggae fusion), Suspiria Franklyn (punk-rock/new wave), Linda Martini (post/noise rock), peixe : aviao (post-rock), Ornatos Violeta (indie rock), A Book in the Shelf (grunge rock), Dream Circus (grunge rock), Decreto 77, (punk rock), or Mazgani (alternative), are other important acts.

The indie and alternative rock movements are also popular in Portugal. Some indie and alternative bands and artists from Portugal are Os Pontos Negros, Memória de Peixe, Linda Martini, The Glockenwise, Capitão Fausto, Frankie Chavez, Stereoboy, Quelle Dead Gazelle, B Fachada, Noiserv, Golden Slumbers (band) as well as the Luso-Brazilian group Banda do Mar.

=== Romantic ===
The highest exponents of this kind of music in Portugal are Tony Carreira and Marco Paulo (both, and even other performers, have a certain level of overlap with the Pimba genre, even partial or just in certain songs).

== Singers of Portuguese descent ==
There are several popular musicians of Portuguese descent. Luso-francofonic artists include Linda de Suza (Portuguese born and later an immigrant in France) and Marie Myriam, winner of the Eurovision Song Contest in 1977. Nelly Furtado reflected some of her Portuguese origins, especially in lesser-known songs in her first albums (songs like "Scared" sung by Furtado in English and Portuguese, "Nas Horas do Dia" and "Força"). Portugal-born Nuno Bettencourt's heritage is also reflected in the title of Extreme's 2008 album Saudades de Rock. Steve Perry, former lead singer of rock group Journey is American of Portuguese ancestry, as is Aerosmith's Joe Perry (both their original paternal family names being Pereira). The lead singer from Jamiroquai, Jay Kay has Portuguese descent through his father. Ana da Silva, a founding member of the cult post-punk band The Raincoats is also of Portuguese origin. Also Mia Rose, which has collaborations with Portuguese artists and even songs in the Portuguese language, was a juror at The Voice Portugal. Others include Katy Perry, Shawn Mendes, Mishlawi and DEV.

== See also ==
- Category:Portuguese musical instruments
