= Canto livre =

Protest music style

Canto livre is a kind of protest music infused with traditional folk and Western music, predominantly supportive of ideas from left-wing political parties, especially the Communist Party, arising after the 1974 Carnation Revolution in Portugal. Notable artists and lyricists from the genre included José Barata-Moura, Manuel Alegre, Ary dos Santos, and Zeca Afonso.

Canto livre was originally nova canção, but after the collapse of the Portuguese dictatorship, artists such as Sérgio Godinho and Luís Cília had a need to explore democracy and its possibilities, and so it evolved into canto livre. Different artists drew upon various influences; Vitorino drew on surrealist ideas, while his brother Janita Salomé drew on Arabic influences, both known as solo artists and for their work with Zeca Afonso in Lua Extravagante.
