= Grândola, Vila Morena =

- 1973 EP cover

Song by José Afonso

from the album Cantigas do Maio
- Language: Portuguese
- Recorded: October 1971
- Studio: Château d'Hérouville, Hérouville, France
- Genre: Folk
- Length: 3:33
- Label: Orfeu
- Songwriter: José Afonso

"Grândola, Vila Morena" (English: Grândola, Swarthy Town) is a Portuguese song by singer-songwriter José Afonso, recorded in 1971. It was originally released in Afonso's 1971 album Cantigas do Maio and later released in an EP of the same name in 1973, and as a single in 1977.

"Grândola, Vila Morena" became an iconic song in Portugal after being used as a radio-broadcast signal by the Portuguese Armed Forces Movement during their military coup operation on the morning of 25 April 1974, which led to the Carnation Revolution and the transition to democracy in Portugal. It has since been considered a symbol of the revolution and anti-fascism.

== Composition and structure ==
José Afonso was inspired to write a song about the town of Grândola after performing at the Sociedade Musical Fraternidade Operária Grandolense, a working-class musical fraternity in Grândola, on 17 May 1964. Afonso created the lyrics and melody while driving back home from Grândola. In the car with him were guitarists Carlos Paredes and Fernando Alvim.

"Grândola, Vila Morena" is an a cappella song, sung in the style of cante alentejano, which tells about the fraternity among the people of Grândola, a town in the Alentejo region of Portugal. Each quatrain of the song is first sung solo, and is followed by a quatrain that repeats the same lines in reverse order, this time sung by a choir.

== Recording ==
The recording of the album Cantigas do Maio, in which "Grândola, Vila Morena" was included, took place at the Strawberry Studio in Château d'Hérouville, in Hérouville, France, in October 1971. It was arranged and produced by José Mário Branco, another famous Portuguese singer-songwriter of canções de intervenção (Portuguese protest songs), whom Afonso had met and befriended in 1969, in France.

The footsteps that can be heard throughout the song marking the rhythm were recorded on an early morning, on a gravel floor outside of the studio building. Branco, Afonso and two other musicians, Francisco Fanhais and Carlos Correia, went out at 3 a.m. to do the recording, in order to avoid the noise caused by passing cars on a nearby road. Later that day, in the afternoon, the vocals were recorded in the studio.

== Live performances ==
The song was performed live by José Afonso for the first time at a show in Santiago de Compostela, Galicia, on 10 May 1972. The show was part of an event organized by students involved in anti-Francoism.

On 29 March 1974, Afonso participated in a concert event at the Coliseu dos Recreios in Lisbon, called "First Meeting of the Portuguese Song" (Portuguese: Primeiro Encontro da Canção Portuguesa). This was an event sponsored by Casa da Imprensa in which several folk singer-songwriters and musicians with anti-Estado Novo inclinations participated. The state censorship still operated in the event, and Afonso was forbidden from performing some of his songs with more political messages, such as "Venham Mais Cinco" and "A Morte Saiu à Rua". "Grândola, Vila Morena", however, was not seen as a subversive song and was allowed to be performed.

Afonso was the last performer of the evening and sang "Grândola, Vila Morena", which was received with enthusiasm by the audience. In a report covering the event, agents of the State Secretariat of Information and Tourism who were in the attendance described Afonso's performance:

Finally José Afonso also sang. But first all the artists joined their arms and began swinging their bodies from left to right, to which they were joined by the audience. He performed "Grândola, Vila Morena" and "Milho Verde" and again "Grândola", accompanied by the audience, who shouted the line "o povo é quem mais ordena" ("the people are in command"). The ending can be considered apotheotic, with light effects focusing on the artists and the audience.

== Role in the Carnation Revolution ==
In the early 1970s, a number of José Afonso's songs were banned by the Estado Novo censors from being publicly played or broadcast, as they were considered to be associated with Communism. "Grândola, Vila Morena" was not one of the banned songs.

Otelo Saraiva de Carvalho, the chief strategist of the military coup by the Armed Forces Movement (MFA), needed a signal that could be transmitted nationwide via radio to all the military officers of the MFA, to indicate the start of their operation. His initial idea was to transmit Afonso's song "Venham Mais Cinco", but João Paulo Diniz, a radio host who participated in the planning, convinced Saraiva de Carvalho that it was not a good idea since the song was forbidden by censors and that would raise suspicion.

Two signals were then decided: the first would be Paulo de Carvalho's "E Depois do Adeus" (which was the Portuguese entry in the Eurovision Song Contest of 1974) and the second would be Afonso's "Grândola, Vila Morena". The plan was to transmit the first signal at 22:55 on 24 April, and the second signal between 00:00 and 01:00 on 25 April.

"E Depois do Adeus" was aired by the Emissores Associados de Lisboa at 22:55, on 24 April 1974. "Grândola, Vila Morena" was afterwards aired by Rádio Renascença, at 00:20 on 25 April 1974. None of the radio hosts involved were aware that there was a plan for a coup d'état.

After the broadcasts, strategic points in Portugal were occupied by the MFA troops. The military coup operation was successful and resulted in the Carnation Revolution, which overthrew the dictatorship of the Estado Novo regime and marked the beginning of the transition to democracy in Portugal.

== Legacy ==
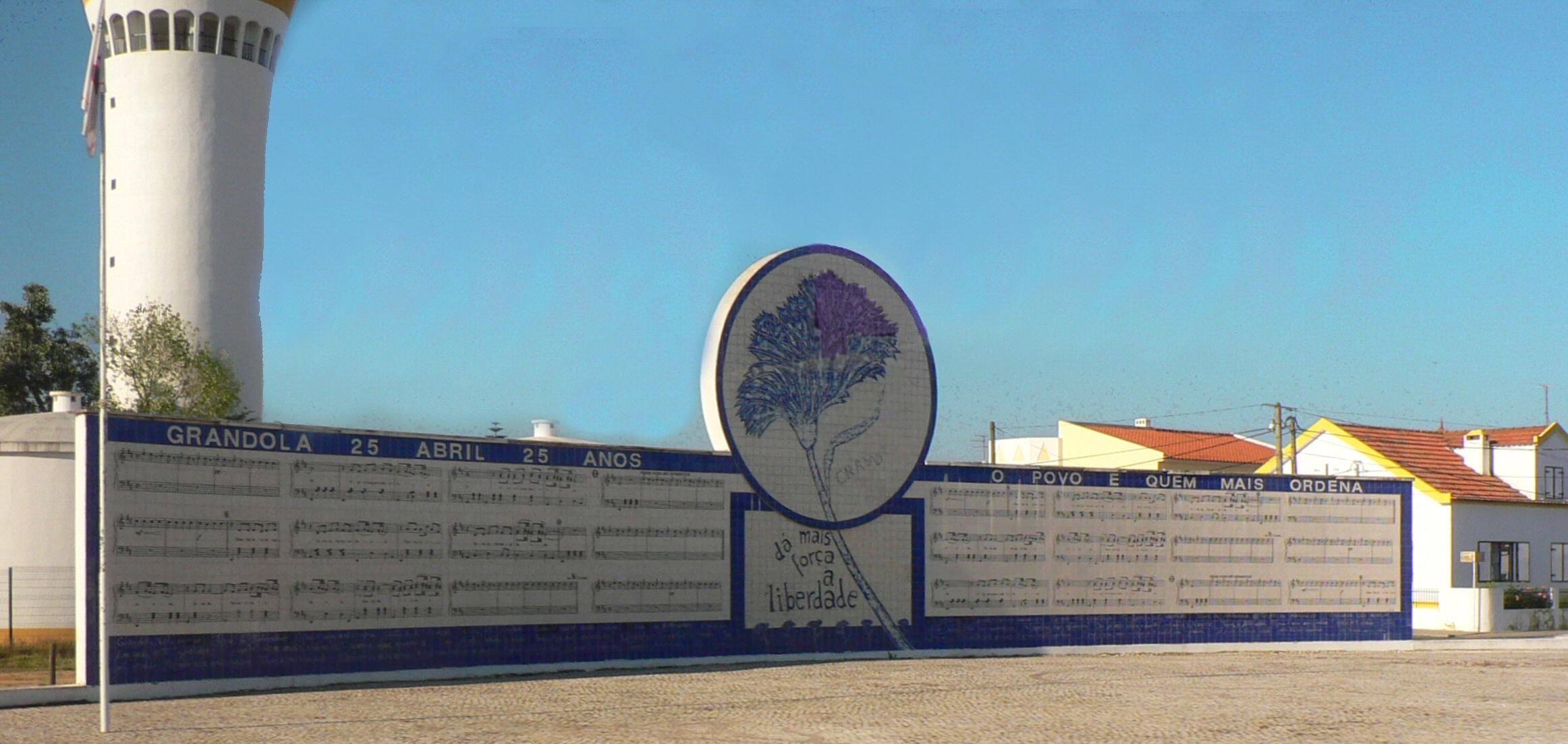
Monument in Grândola in celebration of "Grândola, Vila Morena". The full score and lyrics are painted on the wall.

=== Political legacy ===
"Grândola, Vila Morena" continues to be sung in celebrations of the Carnation Revolution every year in Portugal, on 25 April.

On 15 February 2013, Portuguese prime minister Pedro Passos Coelho was interrupted by a rendition of the song in the Assembly of the Republic (Portuguese Parliament). Protesters in the Assembly's public galleries, unhappy with the contemporary social and economic policies, expressed their discontent through the song.

In September 2020, protests against the Portuguese far-right party Chega in Évora were marked by crowds singing "Grândola, Vila Morena".

=== Cover versions ===
Various artists from around the world have recorded cover versions of "Grândola, Vila Morena". Portuguese artists who have covered the song include Amália Rodrigues, Dulce Pontes, Roberto Leal, María do Ceo and UHF. Internationally, it has been covered by Nara Leão, Franz Josef Degenhardt, Charlie Haden, Agit-Prop, Betagarri, Autoramas, Reincidentes and Garotos Podres.

A version by Spanish singers Cecilia Krull and Pablo Alborán is included in Season 5 of the Netflix series Money Heist.

There also exists an Esperanto version by singer-songwriter Gianfranco Molle, in his 1979 album ´Horo da opozicio´, titled 'Grandula, Urbeto Bruna´.

== Track listing ==
Grândola, Vila Morena (1973 EP)

- A1: "Grândola, Vila Morena"
- A2: "Moda do Entrudo"
- B1: "Traz Outro Amigo Também"
- B2: "Carta a Miguel Djéje"

Grândola, Vila Morena (1977 single)

- A1: "Grândola, Vila Morena"
- B1: "Traz Outro Amigo Também"

== See also ==
- Carnation Revolution
- Armed Forces Movement
