= Cantigas do Maio =

Studio album by José Afonso
- Released: December 1971
- Recorded: October–November 1971
- Studio: Château d'Hérouville, Hérouville, France
- Genre: Folk
- Length: 34:50
- Label: Orfeu

José Afonso chronology
Traz Outro Amigo Também (1970)	Cantigas do Maio (1971)	Eu Vou Ser Como a Toupeira (1972)

Cantigas do Maio (English: "Songs of May") is the fifth studio album by Portuguese singer-songwriter José Afonso. It was released in December 1971 by the Portuguese label Orfeu.

The album is widely considered the best of Afonso's career and one of the all-time greatest albums of Portuguese music. It contains Afonso's most iconic song, "Grândola, Vila Morena", which was used as a radio-broadcast signal by the Portuguese Armed Forces Movement during their military coup operation on the morning of 25 April 1974, which led to the Carnation Revolution and the transition to democracy in Portugal.

== Recording ==
Cantigas do Maio was recorded between 11 October and 4 November 1971 at the Strawberry Studio in Château d'Hérouville, in Hérouville, France.

== Release ==
The album was released in Portugal during the Christmas season of 1971. It was re-released on CD and vinyl, and made available for the first time on streaming services, in April 2022.

== Legacy ==
In 1978, the Portuguese weekly-magazine SETE awarded Cantigas do Maio the "Award for Greatest Album Ever of Portuguese Folk Music" (Prémio Melhor Disco de Sempre da Música Popular Portuguesa).

In 2009, Portuguese music magazine Blitz named Cantigas do Maio the greatest Portuguese album of the 1970s, in a list ranking the best Portuguese albums of the past four decades.

== Track listing ==
All songs written by José Afonso, except where noted.

No.	Title	Lyrics	Music	Length
1.	"Senhor Arcanjo"			3:50
2.	"Cantigas do Maio"			5:50
3.	"Milho Verde"		Popular, arranged by José Mário Branco	2:15
4.	"Cantar Alentejano"			5:30
5.	"Grândola, Vila Morena"			3:30
6.	"Maio Maduro Maio"			3:15
7.	"Ronda das Mafarricas"	António Quadros		2:50
8.	"Mulher da Erva"			2:55
9.	"Cora da Primavera"			4:55
Total length:				34:50

== Personnel ==
Credits are adapted from the album's inner notes.

- José Afonso – vocals
- Carlos Correia (Bóris) – guitar, chorus, steps
- Michel Delaporte – darbuka, Berber bongo, tumbas, Brazilian tamborim, adufe
- Christian Padovan – bass guitar
- Tony Branis – trumpet
- Jacques Granier – flute
- Francisco Fanhais – chorus, steps, whistles, Jew's harp
- José Mário Branco – chorus, steps, accordion, Hammond organ, Fender piano

Production

- José Mário Branco – arrangements, musical direction
- Gilles Sallé – recording, mixing
- Christian Gence – recording, mixing
- José Santa-Bárbara – cover, graphic design
- Patrick Ulmann – photography

== Charts ==
Weekly chart performance for Cantigas do Maio
Chart (2022)	Peak position
Portuguese Albums (AFP)	1

2022 year-end chart performance for Cantigas do Maio
Chart (2022)	Position
Portuguese Albums (AFP)	10
