= Vitorino =

Portuguese singer (born 1942)

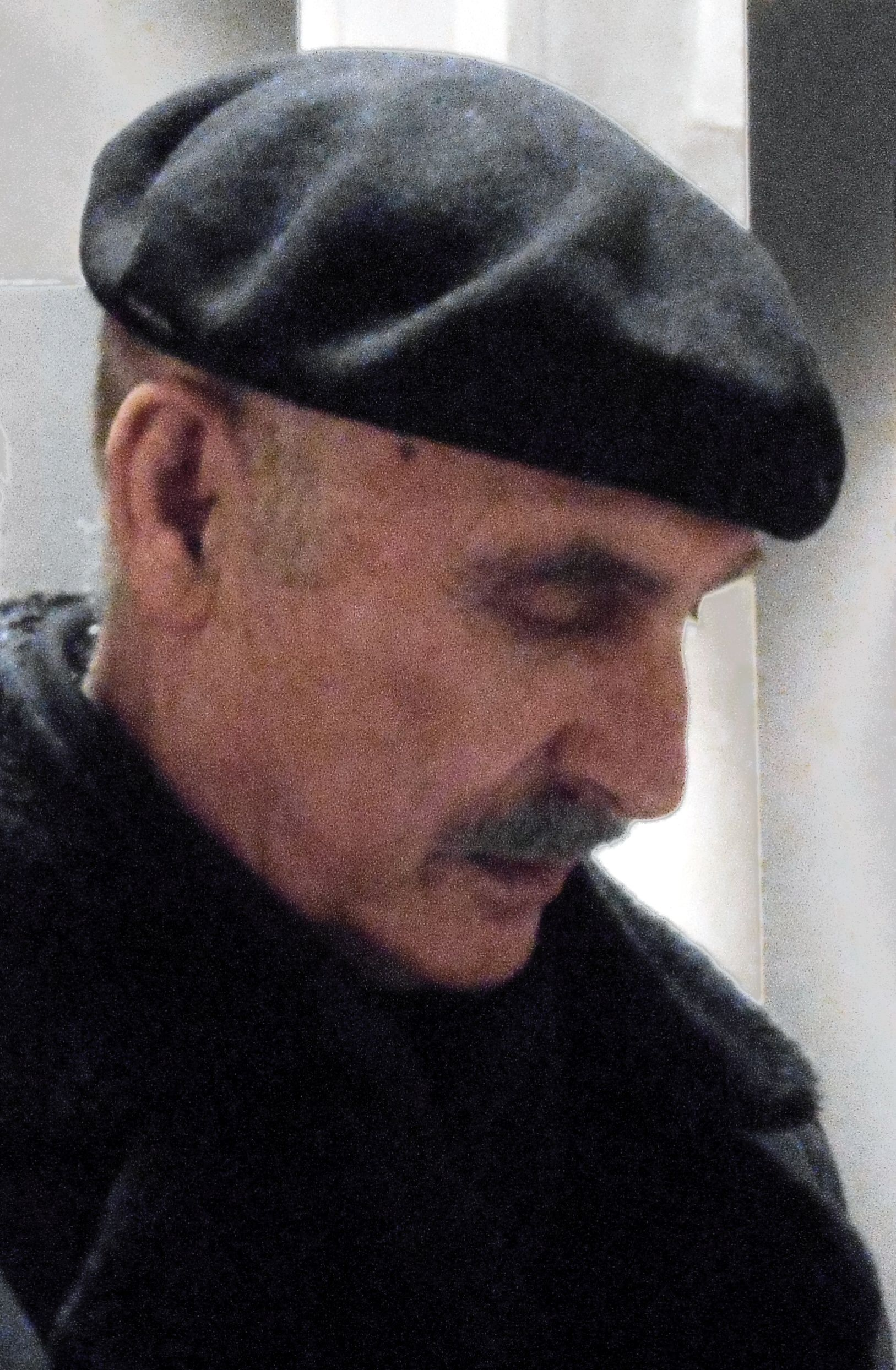
- Vitorino in March 2014

Background information
- Born: Vitorino Salomé Vieira; 11 July 1942 (age 84); Redondo, Portugal
- Origin: Portugal
- Occupation: Singer-songwriter
- Website: www.vitorinosalome.pt

Vitorino Salomé Vieira (born 11 July 1942), commonly known simply as Vitorino, is a Portuguese singer-songwriter. His music combines the traditional music of his native region of Alentejo and urban popular song.

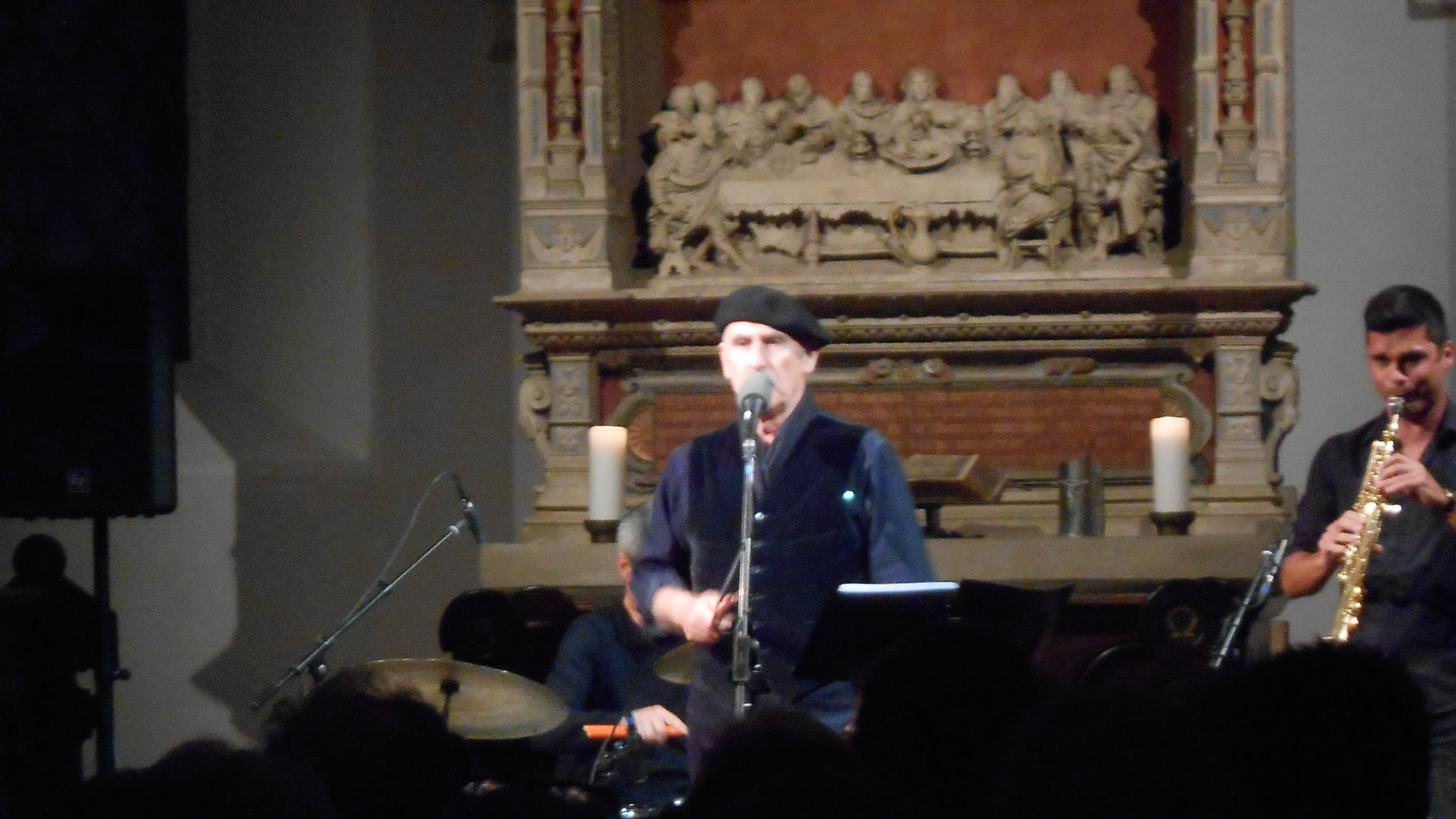
Vitorino singing in the Bleckkirche, the most historic church of Gelsenkirchen.

== Biography ==
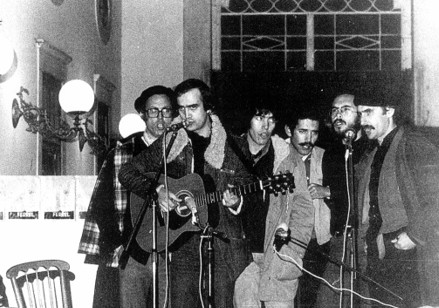
Vitorino in 1979 (on the right, with José Afonso, Fausto, and Sérgio Godinho

Vitorino was born in 1942 in Redondo, to a family of musicians. His father was a Fado de Coimbra singer and mandolin player, as did his grandfather. Vitorino's uncle meanwhile was active in the Lisbon Fado scene. His younger brother, Janita Salomé, is also a musician.

At the age of 11 Vitorino started learning the piano at a monastery in his home town, although he quickly abandoned it and did not go back to formal musical training afterwards. Instead, he sang in local choirs and associations and at private gatherings.

In 1968 he went to Lisbon in pursuit of his artistic studies, where he soon became acquainted with, and became part of, a group of friends encompassing José Afonso, Adriano Correia de Oliveira, Fausto and José Mário Branco. Together with Branco, he left Lisbon in 1969 for Paris, where he, like his friend, began his career as a song writer and protest singer. A notable concert was his appearance at the Théâtre de la Mutualité, where Vitorino joined José Afonso, José Mário Branco, Luís Cília, Sérgio Godinho and Tino Flores in what became one of the most prolific concerts of Portuguese dissidents against the Estado Novo dictatorship.

In 1973 Vitorino returned to Portugal, where he continued his career as a singer. He also joined José Afonso as a guitarist at the I. Encontro da Canção Portuguesa on March 29, 1974 at the Coliseu dos Recreios. His first official release, an 7"-EP named Morra Quem não Tem Amores, was published after the Carnation Revolution in April 1974.

His first album, Semear Salsa Ao Reguinho, was released in 1975. Produced by Fausto and featuring José Afonso and Sérgio Godinho, this album is notable for Vitorino's arrangements of traditional folk songs, like Menina estás à janela, which later became a staple of his live concerts, and for songs Cante Alentejano, a traditional style of music from his home region. Until the 1980s Vitorino often relied on rearranging traditional tunes with help from Pedro Caldeira Cabral; after that the amount of own compositions in his repertoire grew, influenced by different genres, from jazz to classical music and world music.

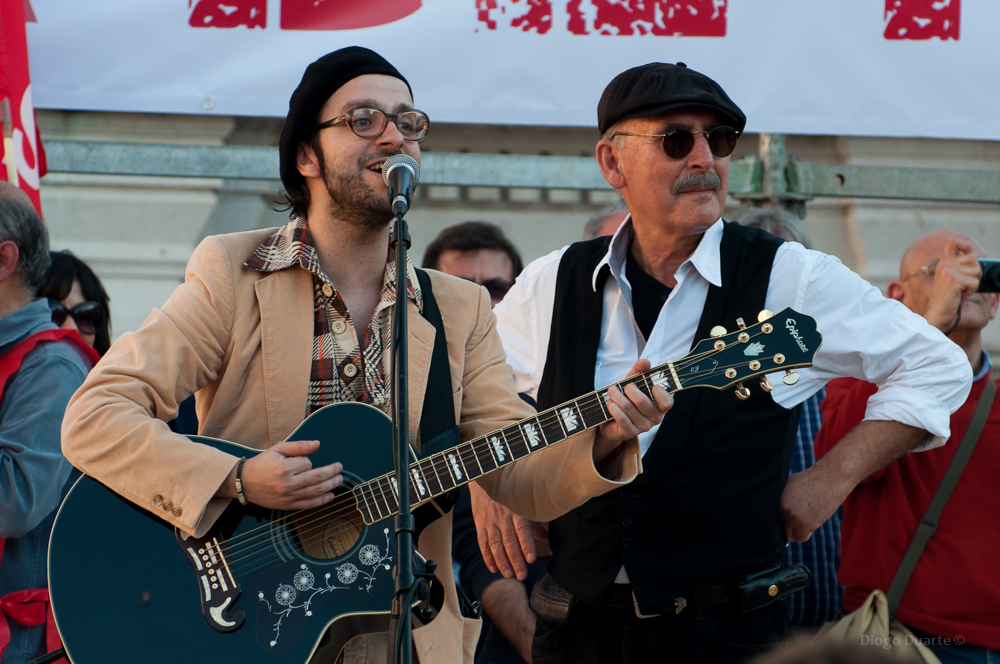
Vitorino (with sun glasses) and Homens da Luta at Occupy protest in Lisbon in 2011.

Vitorino is a founding member of the 1990 Lua Extravagante project, and participated the band Rio Grande, a Portuguese supergroup active from 1996 to 1998 and featuring Portuguese stars like Rui Veloso, Xutos & Pontapés singer Tim, Jorge Palma, and João Gil of Trovante.

For his album Eu Que Me Comovo Por Tudo E Por Nada he received 1993 the José Afonso award, and during the same year he released his Best of album named As Mais Bonitas.

In 1994, Vitorino received the Order of Liberty in the rank of Official.

== Discography ==
=== Albums ===
- Semear Salsa ao Reguinho (LP, Orfeu, 1975) co-produced with Fausto Bordalo Dias
- Se fores ao Alentejo
- Semear salsa ao reguinho
- Cantiga dum marginal do séc.XIX
- A Primavera do Outono
- Ó patrão dê-me um cigarro
- São saias, senhor, são saias
- Dizem p'ra 'í que chegou
- Cantiga de uma greve de Verão
- Temos a força dos ventos
- O tudo é todo nosso
- Menina estás à janela
- Morra quem não tem amores
- Vou-me embora vou partir
- Os Malteses (LP, Orfeu, 1977)
- Alentejo és nossa terra
- Rouxinol repenica o cante
- Oh Beja, terrível Beja
- Barrancos és minha terra
- Saias da União Cooperativa do Redondo
- O maltês
- Cantares do mês d' Outubro
- Fui colher uma romã
- Marcha da patuleia
- Chamaste-me extravagante
- Maio
- Lindo ramo verde escuro
- Não Há Terra Que Resista – Contraponto (LP, Orfeu, 1979)
- Delicada da cintura
- Não há terra que resista
- Litania para um amor ausente
- Contos do príncipe real
- Maria dos mil sorrisos
- Maria da Fonte
- Dá-me cá os braços teus
- Porque me não vês Joana
- Quadras soltas (de embalar)
- Viva a rainha do sul
- Diz a laranja ao limão
- Sedas a vento
- Romances (LP, Orfeu, 1981)
- Catrapiado
- Laurinda
- Dona Filomena
- Bela Nau Catarineta
- Eu hei-de amar uma pedra
- Em 25 de Março
- Senhora Maria
- Levantar ferros
- Mana Isabel
- Sospirastes baldovinos
- Indo eu por 'í abaixo
- Oh! que janela tão alta
- Flor de La Mar (LP, EMI, 1983)
- Leitaria Garrett (LP, EMI, 1984)
- Abertura
- Saias da vila do Redondo
- Menina estás à janela
- Postal para D.João III (ao Zeca Afonso)
- Cantiga partindo-se
- Poema
- Ai os modos de ser lágrima
- Confissões (Nunca fui além)
- Leitaria Garrett
- Andando pela vida (a Lia Gama)
- Tragédia da rua das Gáveas
- Tinta verde
- Carbonárias (final)
- Sul (LP, EMI, 1985)
- Negro Fado (LP, EMI, 1988) PJA
- Cantigas de Encantar (Cassette, EMI, 1989)
- Eu Que Me Comovo Por Tudo e Por Nada (CD, EMI, 1992) PJA
- As Mais Bonitas (Compilação, EMI, 1993)
- A Canção do Bandido (CD, EMI, 1995) CAND PJA
- Fado alexandrino
- Tocador da concertina
- Fado triste
- Fado da prostituta da rua S. António da Glória
- Nasci para morrer contigo
- Fado do pedinte da Igreja dos Mártires
- Cruel vento
- Fado Isabel
- Veste de noite este quarto
- Fado da pré-reforma
- Rigoroso do pescador da marginal
- Fado do jovem velho
- Os nomes do amor
- La Habana 99 (CD, EMI, 1999) with Septeto Habanero
- Alentejanas e Amorosas (CD, EMI, 2001)
- As Mais Bonitas 2 – Ao Alcançe da Mão (Compilation, EMI, 2002)
- Utopia (CD, EMI, 2004) with Janita Salomé
- Ninguém Nos Ganha Aos Matraquilhos! (CD, EMI, 2004)
- Tudo (Compilation, EMI, 2006)
- Abril, Abrilzinho (CD, Público/Praça das Flores, 2006)
- Ao Vivo- Vitorino a preto e branco (CD, Magic Music/Vitorino, 2007)
- Tango (CD, Magic Music/Vitorino, 2009)
- Viva a República (CD de dois originais, comemoração centenário implantação da República, Diário de Notícias/Montepio, 2010)

=== Other compilations ===
- Queda do Império – Colecção Caravela (Compilation, EMI, 1997)
- O Melhor dos Melhores nº 43 (Compilation, Movieplay, 1996)
- Clássicos da Renascença nº 84 (Compilation, Movieplay, 2000)
- Menina Estás À Janela – Colecção Caravelas (Compilation, EMI, 2004)
- Grandes Êxitos (Compilation, EMI, 2006)

=== Singles ===
- Morra Quem Não Tem Amores (Single, 1974)
- Menina Estás À Janela/Tinta Verde dos Teus Olhos (Single, Orfeu, 1983)
- Joana Rosa (Máxi, EMI, 1986)
