= Favela Discos =

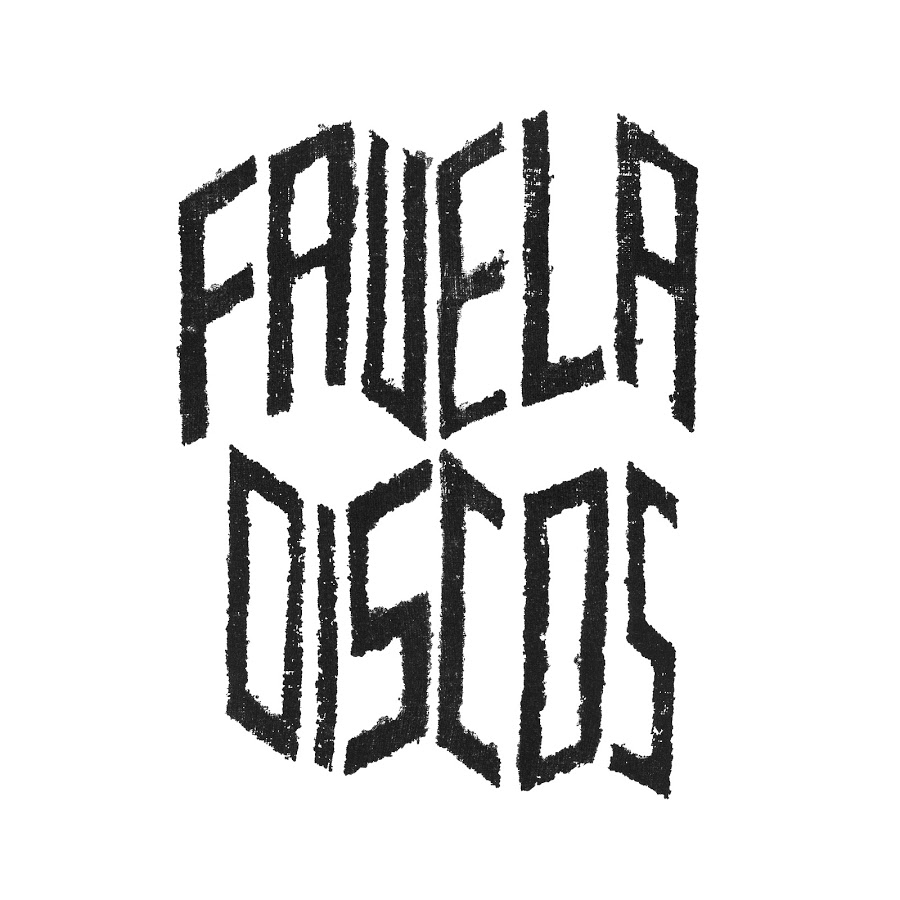
- 'the wording "FAVELA DISCOS" is stylized as a three dimensional object in a two dimensional field.'
- Founded: 2013
- Genre: Electronic; experimental
- Country of origin: Portugal
- Location: Porto
- Official website: faveladiscos.pt

Favela Discos (sometimes referred to as Favela) is a Portuguese electronic music and experimental music record label founded in 2013 as an artists and intellectuals collective based in Porto. It focuses on experimental music, particularly game piece, as well as transethnicism, free improvisation, fluxus, noise, and vaporwave, among other styles. They are considered among others as the future of portuguese music.

== Artists ==
- Batsaykhan
- Bezbog
- David Ole
- Diana Wellington
- Dies Lexic
- Dora Vieira
- Favela Live System
- Guadalupe Fiasco
- Inês Castanheira
- Inês Tartaruga Água
- Jomi
- José Pinhal Post-Mortem Experience
- Judas Triste
- Lorr No
- Max Potion
- Milteto
- MotoRotos
- Nuno O
- Pepe Marcio
- Rita Laranja
- Sarnadas
- Tito Frito
- Vasco Da Ganza
- Vive Les Cônes
- Well
- Xavier Paes

Guest artists:

- Drvg Cvltvre
- Evamuss

Past members:

- Airlift
- Arzemnieks
- ASPHALTO
- Carocho
- Claiana
- Das monstrvm
- Desgrace
- Dizmental
- Dj Campanhã
- Gabriel Ferrandini & Pedro Sousa
- Mada Treku
- Moleke$
- Os Canto-Esquina
- Olumarak
- Pai Inválido
- Psyderman
- SMOP
- The 1969 Revolutionary Orgy
- úlfr
- Xamano
- XTRMNTR_VKTR

== See also ==
- List of record labels
- Fado
- sardine
