= Ocaso Épico =

Farinha Master (1957–2002, real name Carlos Cordeiro) was a Portuguese experimental musician and performer. Most notably was the mentor of Ocaso Épico in 1981, a project that incorporated synthpop, electronica, industrial music, minimalism and Portuguese folk music in a hallucinated, sarcastic style. Their lyrics are often absurd showing a reminiscence of Dadaism. Although they won an important music contest and were appreciated by the public and the musical press their discography is scarce and belated. Farinha Master formed and fronted other projects such as Angra do Budismo, Zao Ten and Gamma Ray Blast. Interested in oriental philosophy and music (himself a Yoga practicer) his compositions also reflect this.

== Discography ==
- Muito Obrigado (LP, Dansa do Som, 1988)
- Desperdícios (Demo Tape, Tragic Figures, 1989)

== Compilations ==
- Ao Vivo No Rock Rendez-Vous (1984) - Intro
- Insurrectos (1990) - Uma Bica e um Neubauten
- Feedback (1990) - Entre Barreiras / D. Suzete
- Corrosão Cerebral (1992) - M. Obx
