= Fausto Bordalo Dias =

Portuguese singer and composer (1948–2024)

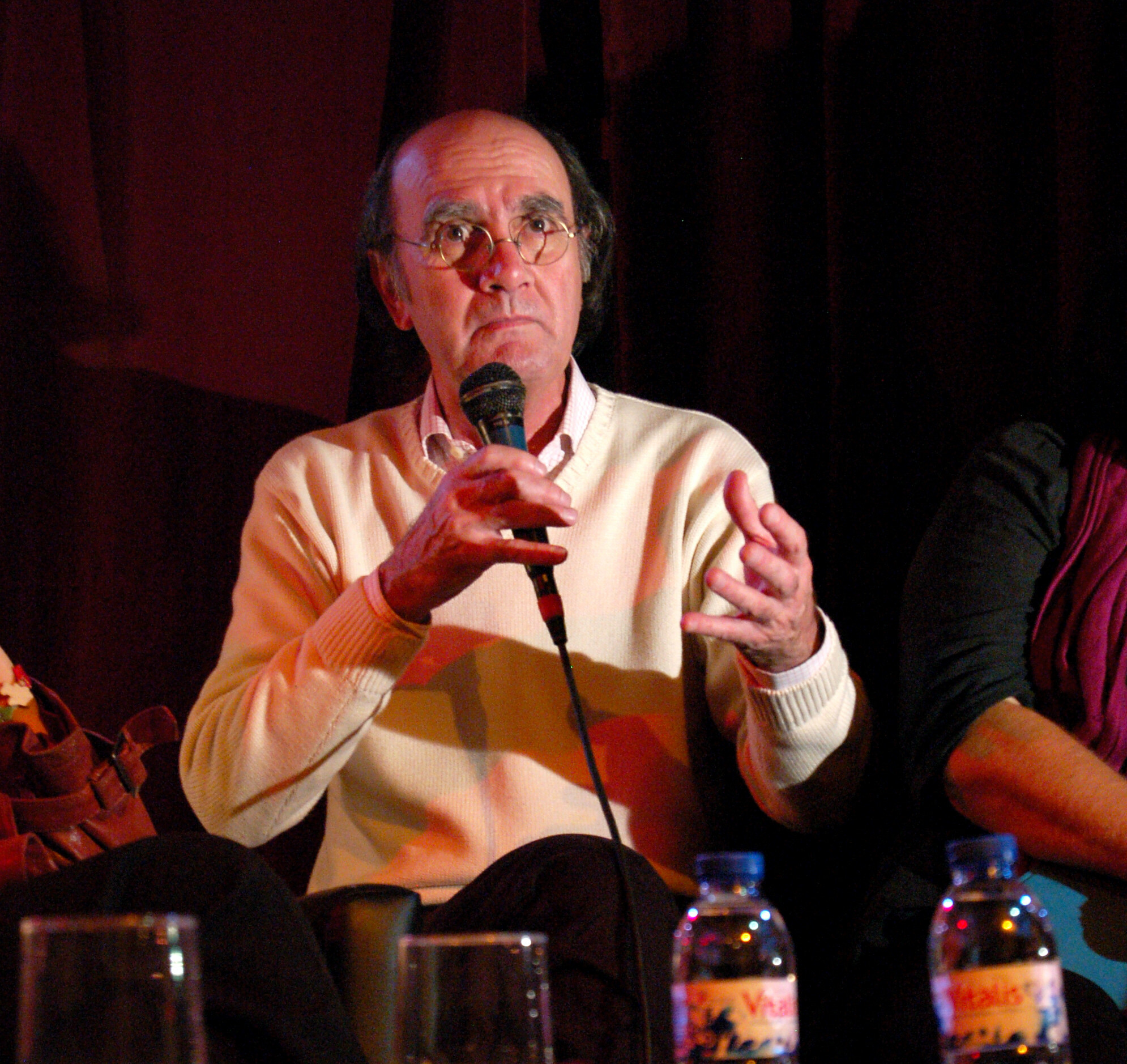
- Fausto in 2010

Background information
- Birth name: Carlos Fausto Bordalo Gomes Dias
- Also known as: Fausto
- Born: 26 November 1948; Atlantic Ocean
- Origin: Portugal
- Died: 1 July 2024 (aged 75); Lisbon, Portugal
- Genres: Folk, progressive folk
- Occupation(s): Singer, composer
- Instrument(s): Vocals, guitar
- Years active: 1969–2024
- Labels: Universal Music

Carlos Fausto Bordalo Gomes Dias OL (26 November 1948 – 1 July 2024), known as Fausto Bordalo Dias or simply Fausto, was a Portuguese composer, guitarist and singer.

== Biography ==
Although he was born aboard the ship Pátria when traveling between mainland Portugal and then Portuguese Angola, Fausto Bordalo Dias was registered in Vila Franca das Naves, Trancoso. It was in the former Portuguese overseas province of Angola that he formed his first band, Os Rebeldes. There, to the musicality of his Beira origin, he assimilated African rhythms. At 20, in Lisbon, where he settled in order to continue his studies - he graduated in political and social sciences at the then called Instituto Superior de Ciências Sociais e Política Ultramarina, later renamed to Instituto Superior de Ciências Sociais e Políticas which belongs now to University of Lisbon - he released his first album, Fausto, with which he won the Revelation Award in 1969.

Within the associative movement in Lisbon, he got close to names like José Afonso, Adriano Correia de Oliveira, Manuel Freire, together with José Mário Branco or Luís Cília, who were living in exile. During the Portuguese Colonial War he was conscripted to the theatre of military operations in Portuguese Guinea and by refusing to perform military service he became a military absentee. After the Carnation Revolution of 1974, he distanced himself from PREC-inspired protest song and embraced Portuguese traditional music with strong influences from traditional music of Minho, Beira and Trás-os-Montes e Alto Douro regions.

Fausto died after battling an undisclosed illness, in Lisbon, on 1 July 2024. He was 75.

== Discography ==
=== Studio albums ===
- Fausto (1970)
- P'ró Que Der e Vier (1974)
- Beco com saída (1975)
- Madrugada dos Trapeiros (1977)
- Histórias de Viajeiros (1979)
- Por Este Rio Acima (1982)
- O despertar dos alquimistas (1985)
- Para além das cordilheiras (1987)
- A preto e branco (1988)
- Crónicas da terra ardente (1994)
- A Ópera Mágica do Cantor Maldito (2003)
- Em Busca das Montanhas Azuis (2011)

=== Singles and EPs ===
- Fausto (EP) (1969)
- Guerra do Mirandum (1984)

=== Compilation albums ===
- O Melhor dos Melhores (1994)
- Atrás dos Tempos Vêm Tempos (1996)
- Grande Grande É a Viagem (live) (1999)
- 18 canções de amor e mais uma de ressentido protesto (2007)

=== Collaborations ===
- Três Cantos (live) with José Mário Branco and Sérgio Godinho (2009)

== Awards ==
- 1988 – José Afonso award
- 9 June 1994 – Order of Liberty
