= Amélia Muge =

Mozambique-born Portuguese singer

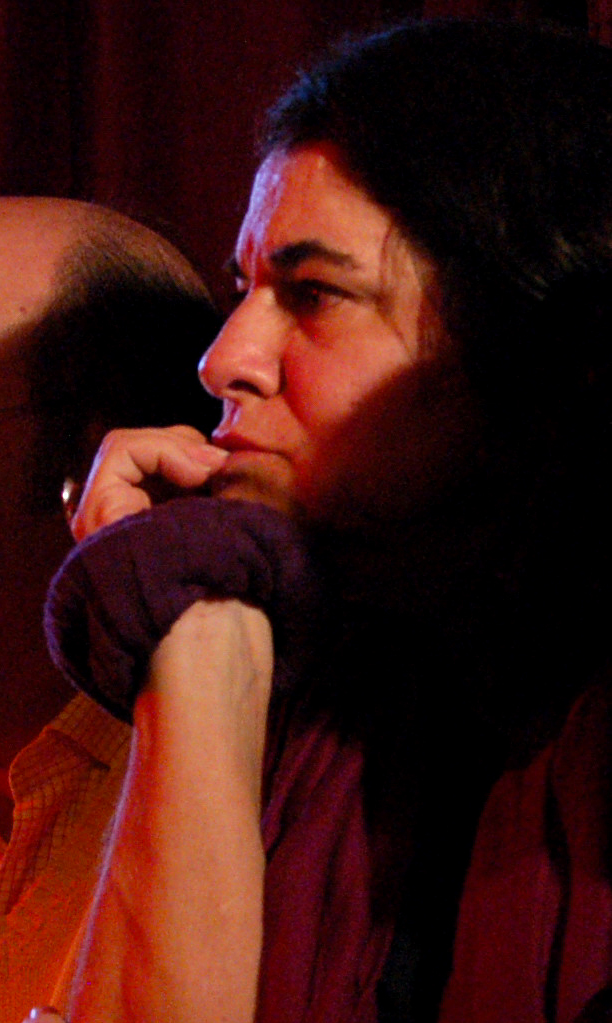

Amélia Muge (full name is Maria Amélia Salazar Muge, born 1952) is a Mozambique-born Portuguese singer, instrumentalist, composer, and lyricist. She is noted for her fado voice and poetic lyrics.

== Discography ==
- Múgica (UPAV, 1992)
- Todos os Dias (Sony, 1994)
- Maio Maduro Maio - with João Afonso and José Mário Branco (Sony, 1995)
- Taco a taco (Polygram, 1998)
- Novas vos Trago (1998)
- A Monte (Vachier, 2002)
- Não Sou Daqui (Vachier, 2007)
- Uma Autora, 202 Canções (Character Ediora, 2009)
- Periplus (2012)
