= Château d'Hérouville =

French château in Hérouville, France

Coordinates: 49°6′5.8″N 2°7′59″E

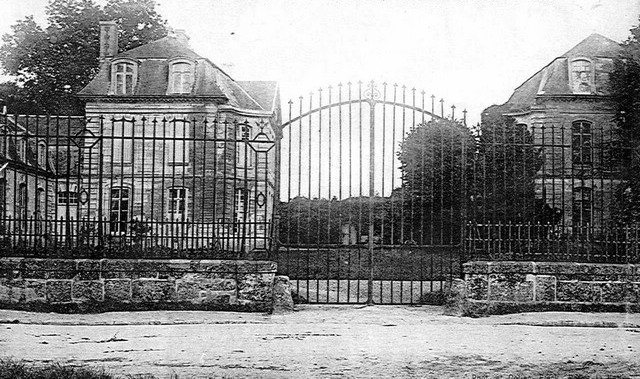
Château d'Hérouville

The Château d'Hérouville (commonly referred to as Honky Château) is a French 18th-century château located in the village of Hérouville, in the Val-d'Oise département of France, near Paris. The château was built in 1740 by "Gaudot", an architect of the school of Rome, from the remains of an earlier 16th-century château. In the 19th century, it was used as a courier relay station (between Versailles and Beauvais) and stabled hundreds of horses.

Several accounts, including one by the BBC, suggest that in the mid-19th century, composer Frédéric Chopin conducted his love affair with the writer George Sand there. The château was painted by Vincent van Gogh, who is buried nearby. The estate also doubled as a recording studio starting in the late 1960s, producing iconic hit records throughout the 1970s, until its closure in 1985. The studio reopened in 2020.

== Architecture ==
The château comprises two wings, plus a number of outbuildings. It has 30 rooms, a swimming pool and a tennis court and is set in 1.7 hectares of parkland. An octagonal stone drinking trough in the courtyard is a protected historical monument.

== History of recording studio ==
The composer Michel Magne purchased the chateau in 1962. He was best known for having been nominated in 1962 by the Academy of Motion Picture Arts and Sciences for Best Music, Scoring of Music, Adaptation or Treatment for Gigot. He converted the building into a residential recording studio after a fire devastated its left wing in 1969. The musician, director and sound engineer Laurent Thibault took over management of the studio in June 1974.

The studio has been referred to by many names in album credits including Studio Hérouville, Château d'Hérouville, Michel Magne Studios, Strawberry Studios, and by the nickname Honky Chateau.

Rex Foster's Roads of Tomorrow was the first album recorded at Château in 1969–70, and released in 1971. On his website, Foster claims that during the Roads session he gave it the nickname "the Honky Château."

The Grateful Dead were at the château on 21 June 1971. Jerry Garcia tells the story:

We went over there to do a big festival, a free festival they were gonna have, but the festival was rained out. It flooded. We stayed at this little chateau which is owned by a film score composer who has a 16-track recording studio built into the chateau, and this is a chateau that Chopin once lived in; really old, just delightful, out in the country near the town of Auvers-sur-Oise, which is where Vincent van Gogh is buried.

We were there with nothing to do: France, a 16-track recording studio upstairs, all our gear, ready to play, and nothing to do. So, we decided to play at the chateau itself, out in the back, in the grass, with a swimming pool, just play into the hills. We didn't even play to hippies, we played to a handful of townspeople in Auvers. We played and the people came — the chief of police, the fire department, just everybody. It was an event and everybody just had a hell of a time — got drunk, fell in the pool. It was great.

A recording of the Grateful Dead's performance is available online.

During the first years of the studio, in 1971 and 1972, some important records of political Portuguese folk music (Música de Intervenção) were recorded at Château d'Hérouville. These included the seminal record Cantigas do Maio by singer-songwriter José Afonso in 1971. Also in 1971, José Mário Branco recorded his debut album Mudam-se os tempos mudam-se as vontades and Sérgio Godinho recorded Os Sobreviventes. Sérgio Godinho would also record his second album Pré-Histórias at the chateau in 1972.

Many other artists recorded at the château including Elton John, who recorded his albums Honky Château (the title inspired by the house), Don't Shoot Me I'm Only the Piano Player (both in 1972) and Goodbye Yellow Brick Road (1973) at the studio. Pink Floyd recorded their seventh studio album, Obscured by Clouds (which also served as the soundtrack to the French film La Vallée), there in February 1972.

Jethro Tull attempted to record their sixth studio album at the château in late 1972, but the band was displeased with the studio and so the sessions were ultimately abandoned, with the band referring to the Château as the "Château d'Isaster". Three tracks from the band's sessions at the Château were later released on their seventh studio album War Child (1974) and several more were released on the compilation album Nightcap (1993).

Chris Bell, of the Memphis-based cult band Big Star, recorded solo tracks with Apple Records engineer Claude Harper at the studio in September and October 1974. The songs, recorded along with drummer Richard Rosebrough, would be released on his now acclaimed I Am the Cosmos LP. The posthumously released record saw its first release in 1992, nearly 13 years after Bell's death in December 1978.

Sweet recorded part of their final album by their classic lineup, Level Headed, there as a four-piece group as Brian Connolly later left. The single "Love Is Like Oxygen" was taken from this recording, and was a top ten hit around the world and nominated for an Ivor Novello Award.

Uriah Heep recorded their album Sweet Frredom there in June–July 1973.

During David Bowie's time spent at the château whilst recording Low with Tony Visconti and Brian Eno, the three claimed to have felt supernatural, or 'haunting' experiences. Visconti stated:

There was certainly some strange energy in that Château. On the first day David took one look at the master bedroom and said, 'I'm not sleeping in there!' He took the room next door. The master bedroom had a very dark corner, right next to the window, ironically, that seem to just suck light into it. It was colder in that corner too.

Eno also claimed to have been awoken early every morning with someone shaking his shoulder. When he opened his eyes no one was there.

Bowie previously recorded his album Pin Ups at the studio in 1973.

In 1977, the Bee Gees recorded at the château to avoid the high tax rate of Britain, where they laid down the tracks for the soundtrack to Saturday Night Fever.

=== 1985 closure ===
Legal and financial problems surrounded Magne's sale of the château in 1984. The studio closed on 25 July 1985, one year after Magne's suicide, Thibault and his team having been expelled by the liquidator of Michel Magne's estate. The château and its gardens were abandoned to squatters and overgrowth. In 2013, the château was put up for sale with an asking price of €1.29m, needing an estimated €300,000 of renovations.

=== Reopening of recording studio ===
In 2015 a group of audio engineers, including Stéphane Marchi, rebuilt the recording studios and started the Sup HD audio audio recording master classes.

According to the BBC, the studio was due to re-open in 2016.

Four years after the planned opening date the renovations were complete and the Château was opened again in September 2020.

== Selected discography ==
- Gong – Camembert Electrique (1971)
- José Afonso – Cantigas do Maio (1971)
- Elton John – Honky Château (1972), Don't Shoot Me I'm Only the Piano Player (1973), Goodbye Yellow Brick Road (1973)
- Pink Floyd – Obscured by Clouds (1972)
- Joan Armatrading & Pam Nestor – Whatever's for Us (1972)
- T. Rex – The Slider (1972), Tanx (1973)
- Jethro Tull – Nightcap: The Unreleased Masters 1972–1991 (recorded 1972, released 1993), A Passion Play – An Extended Performance (recorded 1972, released 2014)
- Cat Stevens – Catch Bull at Four (1972)
- Uriah Heep – Sweet Freedom (1973)
- Chris Bell – I Am the Cosmos (recorded 1974–75, released 1992/reissued 2017)
- David Bowie – Pin Ups (1973), Low (1977)
- Nektar – Recycled (1975)
- Rick Wakeman – No Earthly Connection (1976)
- Bad Company – Burnin' Sky (1977)
- Iggy Pop – The Idiot (1977)
- Bee Gees – "How Deep Is Your Love" and "Stayin' Alive" from Saturday Night Fever (1977)
- Jacques Higelin – Alertez les bébés ! (1976), No Man's Land (1977), Champagne pour tout le monde, Caviar pour les autres... (1979)
- Rainbow – Long Live Rock 'n' Roll (1978)
- Sweet – Level Headed (1978)
- Sham 69 – The Adventures of the Hersham Boys (1979)
- Fleetwood Mac – Mirage (1982)
- Michael Schenker Group – Assault Attack (1982)
- Brion Starr – A Night To Remember (2021)

=== Selected artists ===
- José Mário Branco (1971)
- Sérgio Godinho (1971–1972)
- MC5 (1972)
- Alain Kan (1974)
- New Trolls (1978)
- Claudio Baglioni (1979)
- Kazuhiko Katō (1981)
- Sparks (2022)
- Texas (2023)
