= Adriano Correia de Oliveira =

Portuguese musician (1942 - 1982)

Background information
- Born: 9 April 1942; Avintes, Vila Nova de Gaia
- Origin: Portugal
- Died: 16 October 1982 (aged 40); Avintes, Vila Nova de Gaia
- Genres: Fado, protest music
- Occupation: Singer
- Years active: 1960s–1970s

Adriano Maria Correia Gomes de Oliveira, GCIH, ComL, or just Adriano (9 April 1942 – 16 October 1982) was a Portuguese musician, born to a conservative Roman Catholic family in Porto. His family moved to Avintes after his birth. He went to Coimbra to study at the University of Coimbra, and eventually dropped out, albeit being involved in the student activism and Coimbra fado music.

Adriano was part of a generation of composers and singers of political songs that used music and lyrics to fight against the Estado Novo dictatorial regime. For that, he became famous among the pro-democratic resistance and was persecuted by the political police, PIDE, for his anti-dictatorial actions. Adriano was a personal friend of musicians Zeca Afonso, Padre Fanhais, Sérgio Godinho, and Luísa Basto, with whom he collaborated in the recording of many albums.

His first recording, Fado de Coimbra, was released in 1963, accompanied by António Portugal and Rui Pato. In this record he performs the first rendition of Trova do Vento Que Passa, with poetry by Manuel Alegre, which would become a sort of anthem of resistance to the dictatorship. In 1967 he recorded the album Adriano Correia de Oliveira with, among other songs, "Canção com Lágrimas".

During his military service in 1969, O Canto e as Armas, with poetry by Manuel Alegre, was released followed in 1970 by Cantaremos and Gente de Aqui e de Agora in 1971. After the Carnation Revolution, the single "Que Nunca Mais" with poems by Manuel da Fonseca was released. The record, directed and produced by Fausto Bordalo Dias, includes a rare participation of guitarist Carlos Paredes. That year, he was nominated artist of the year by Musicweek.

Adriano was also a member of the Portuguese Communist Party and participated many times in the Avante! Festival annual fest. He was a close friend of the socialist Manuel Alegre, who wrote many of his lyrics. He died in Avintes at the age of 40 due to a vascular accident.

== Albums ==
- 1967 – "Adriano Correia de Oliveira"
- 1969 – O canto e as armas
  - E de súbito um sino
  - Raiz
  - E a carne se fez verbo
  - E o bosque se fez barco
  - Peregrinação
  - A batalha de Alcácer-Quibir
  - Regresso
  - Canção da fronteira
  - Por aquele caminho
  - Canto da nossa tristeza
  - Trova do vento que passa N.2
  - As mãos
  - Post-scriptum
- 1970 – Cantaremos
  - Cantar de emigração
  - Saudade pedra e espada
  - Fala do homem nascido
  - O Sol p'rguntou à Lua
  - Canção para o meu amor não se perder no mercado da concorrência
  - Lágrima de preta
  - Canção com lágrimas
  - Cantar para um pastor
  - Como hei-de amar serenamente
  - Sapateia
  - A noite dos poetas
- 1971 – Gente de aqui e de agora
  - Emigração
  - E alegre se fez triste
  - O senhor morgado
  - Cana verde
  - A vila de Alvito
  - Canção tão simples
  - Cantiga de amigo
  - Para Rosalia
  - Roseira brava
  - História do quadrilheiro Manuel Domingos Louzeiro
- 1975 – Que nunca mais
  - Tejo que levas as águas
  - O senhor gerente
  - As balas
  - No vale escuro
  - Tu e eu meu amor
  - Recado a Helena
  - Dona Abastança
  - Cantiga de Montemaior
  - P'ra a frente
- 1980 – Cantigas Portuguesas
