= José Afonso =

Portuguese singer-songwriter (1929–1987)

- José Afonso

Background information
- Also known as: Zeca Afonso
- Born: José Manuel Cerqueira Afonso dos Santos; 2 August 1929; Aveiro, Portugal
- Died: 23 February 1987 (aged 57) Setúbal, Portugal
- Genres: Folk; Protest song; Coimbra fado
- Occupations: Singer, songwriter, teacher, activist
- Instruments: Vocals, guitar
- Years active: 1953–1987

José Manuel Cerqueira Afonso dos Santos (2 August 1929 – 23 February 1987), known professionally as José Afonso and also popularly known as Zeca Afonso, was a Portuguese singer-songwriter. He is widely regarded as one of the most influential figures in the history of Portugal's folk and protest music scene. His music played a significant role in the resistance against the dictatorial Estado Novo regime, making him an icon in Portugal.

Afonso's song "Grândola, Vila Morena" was used as a radio-broadcast signal by the Armed Forces Movement during their military coup operation in the morning of 25 April 1974, which led to the Carnation Revolution and the transition to democracy in Portugal. Subsequently, Afonso's music, along with "Grândola, Vila Morena," became emblematic of the revolution, anti-fascism, the Portuguese labor movement, and the political left.

== Biography ==
=== 1929–1940: Early life ===
José Afonso was born in Aveiro on 2 August 1929. His parents were José Nepomuceno Afonso dos Santos, a magistrate, and Maria das Dores Dantas Cerqueira, a primary school teacher.

In 1930, his parents travelled to Angola, a Portuguese colony at the time, where his father had been placed as a judge in the city of Silva Porto (present-day Cuíto). For health reasons, Afonso stayed in Aveiro, in a house near the Fonte das Cinco Bicas, with his aunt Gigé and his uncle Xico, a "republican and anticlerical" man. In 1933 Afonso travelled to Angola at his mother's request. On the ship he met a missionary who became his companion during the voyage. Afonso stayed for three years in Angola, where he began his primary education.

In 1936, he returned to Aveiro. In 1937 he went to live overseas for the second time, this time to Mozambique, another Portuguese colony in Africa, where his parents were then living with his siblings João and Mariazinha.

He returned to Portugal in 1938, this time to the house of his uncle Filomeno, mayor of the town of Belmonte. There he finished the fourth grade. His uncle, a fierce fascist supporter, made him a join the "Mocidade Portuguesa", a paramilitary style political indoctrination youth organization conceived by the right-wing regime of Salazar and the Estado Novo, to provide regime aligned cadres and future leaders.

=== 1940–1956: The Coimbra years ===
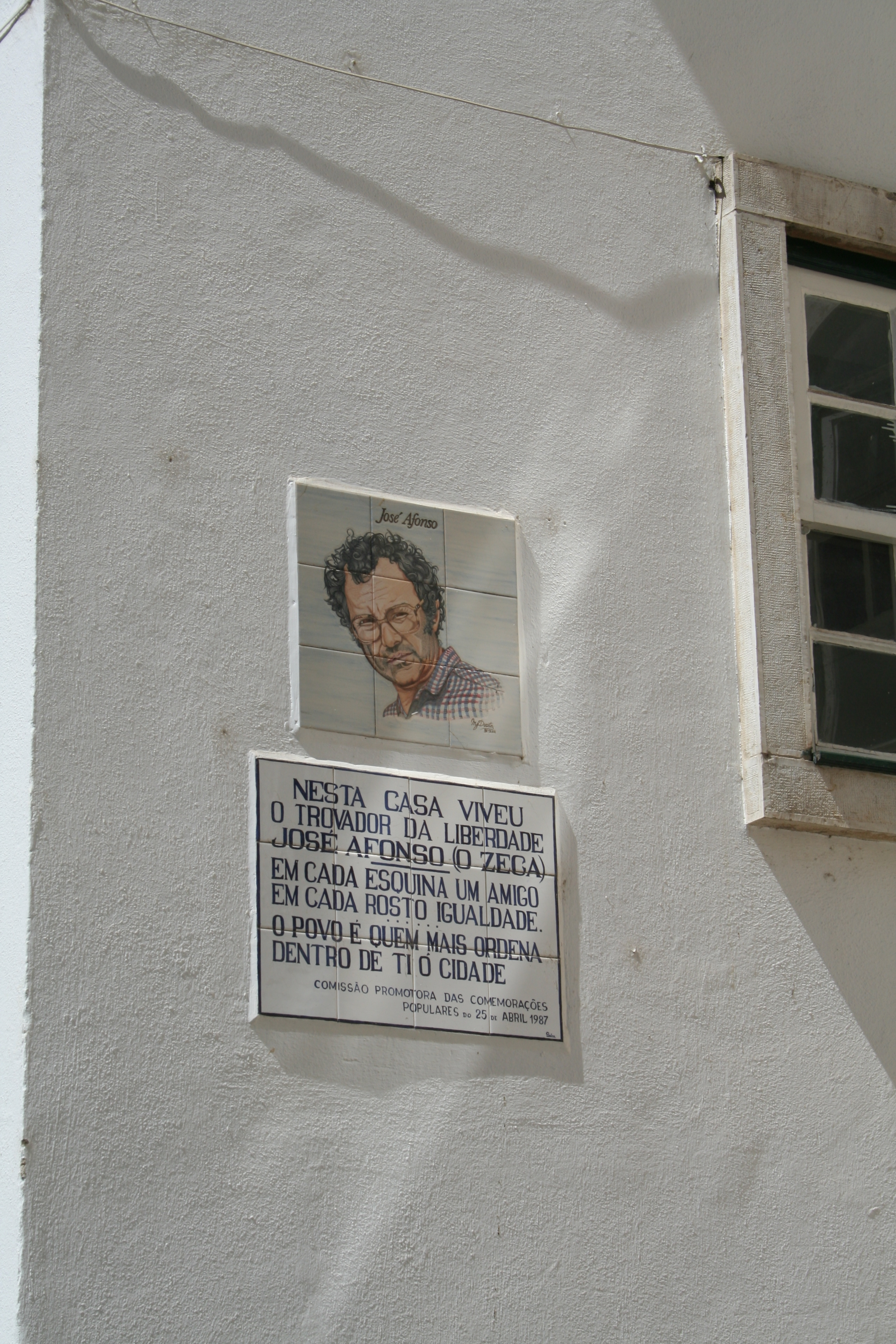
Homage azulejo at the house where José Afonso lived in Coimbra

He went to Coimbra in 1940 to continue his studies. He studied in the D. João III Lyceum and lived with his aunt Avrilete. His family went from Mozambique to East Timor, also a Portuguese overseas territory at that time, where his father continued his job as a judge. Mariazinha went with them while his brother João returned to Portugal. After the occupation of Timor by the Japanese, Afonso received no news from his parents for three years, until the end of World War II in 1945.

When he was in his 5th year of lyceum studies, Afonso started singing seranades as a bicho (meaning a non-human ugly or scary creature), a rank used in the University of Coimbra praxe for lyceum students. He became known as the "bicho-cantor" (singing creature).

From 1946 to 1948 he worked to finish his lyceum studies, after failing two years. He met Maria Amália de Oliveira, whom he married secretly due to his parents' opposition. He traveled with some of the most important university musical groups, such as Orfeon Académico de Coimbra, and played football for Associação Académica de Coimbra.

In 1949 he started studying History and Philosophy at Coimbra University. With the Orfeon Académico de Coimbra, he travelled to Angola and Mozambique.

In January 1953, his first son José Manuel was born. Later that year, his first recordings were released. These were two 78-rpm records of Coimbra fado songs, of which no copies exist today.

Between 1953 and 1955, he served compulsory military service. He was mobilized to Macau, a Portuguese territory at the time, but due to health problems he was discharged. He was afterwards stationed in Coimbra until completing military service. His first son José Manuel (Zé Manel) was born in january 1953, his elder daughter Helena in december 1953. During this time he experienced many economic difficulties and eventually divorced his wifei.

=== 1956–1968: Work as a teacher, first albums and early political action ===
In 1956 Afonso released his first EP, Fados de Coimbra. After his military service, he started working as a teacher. From January to September 1957 he worked at a private school in Mangualde and afterwards worked at the Industrial and Commercial School of Lagos between October 1957 and July 1959. Due to his financial problems, he sent his children to the Portuguese overseas territory of Mozambique in 1958, to live with his parents. In that year he became enthralled by Humberto Delgado's presidential campaign; Delgado lost due to massive electoral fraud perpetrated by the authoritarian Estado Novo regime.

Between October 1959 and July 1960 he worked at the Technical School of Alcobaça. It was during 1959 and 1960 that he started singing in his trademark musical style, coloured with political and social connotations, touring with many popular groups around the country and gradually becoming a favourite among the working class and the rural population. He toured for a month in Angola with the Orfeon Académico de Coimbra. In 1960 he released another EP, Balada do Outono.

From 1961 to 1962 he followed the pro-democracy student strikes and demonstrations demanding the end of the authoritarian Estado Novo regime, which were brutally repressed by the police. He continued releasing many of his songs and introduced important new guitar arrangements. He played in Switzerland, Germany and Sweden, with a fado guitar group that included Adriano Correia de Oliveira, José Niza, Jorge Godinho, Durval Moreirinhas and the singer Esmeralda Amoedo.

He released a new EP, named Baladas de Coimbra, in 1962. He completed his university studies in 1963 with a thesis about Jean-Paul Sartre, which got a grade of 11 out of 20. That year he also finalized his divorce from his wife Maria Amália.

In 1964 he released his first studio album, Baladas e Canções ("Ballads and Songs"). In May 1964, Afonso performed at the Sociedade Musical Fraternidade Operária Grandolense (Workers' Fraternity Musical Society of Grândola) in Grândola, where he found the inspiration to compose his most famous song, "Grândola, Vila Morena". The song would be recorded years later for his album Cantigas do Maio, and would become one of signals for the start of the Carnation Revolution in April 1974.

From 1964 to 1967, Afonso was in Lourenço Marques (now Maputo) and Beira, in Mozambique, with his second wife Zélia, where he reunited with his children. In his last two years in the overseas province, he taught in Beira and composed music for the Bertolt Brecht play The Exception and The Rule. In 1965 his daughter Joana was born and by 1967, marked by the colonial reality and the Portuguese Colonial War, he returned to Lisbon. He left his older son, José Manuel, with his grandparents in Mozambique.

Back in Portugal, Afonso took up a secondary school teacher position in Setúbal, where he developed a severe health crisis which left him hospitalized for 20 days. After receiving hospital discharge, he found out that he had been expelled from public school teaching because the regime censors disapproved of his leftist political ideals and considered his songs highly subversive. Later, the book Cantares de José Afonso (Songs of José Afonso) was published. The Portuguese Communist Party leadership invited him to become a party member but Afonso refused. He signed a contract with the record label Orfeu, which would record 70% of his works.

=== 1968–1974: Prolific period and anti-regime activities ===
In 1968, after being dismissed from the government teaching job, Afonso became a private tutor and started singing more regularly with popular groups from the south bank of the Tagus river, a region which had a stronger influence of the Portuguese Communist Party. Around Christmas, Afonso released the album Cantares do Andarilho ("Songs of the Wanderer"), in collaboration with Rui Pato, the first album recorded for the label Orfeu. Afonso had a special contract with Orfeu, for he was paid 15,000 escudos per month, a princely sum at the time, under the condition that he recorded an album per year.

In 1969, with the replacement of hardliner António de Oliveira Salazar by the more moderate Marcelo Caetano as head of the Estado Novo regime, the nation got a slight taste of democracy, such as permission to rebuild a democratic Labour Union movement. José Afonso joined the movement and supported it by all the means he could while also taking part in the second wave of student rebellion against the regime in the university town of Coimbra. That year, his album Contos Velhos Rumos Novos ("Old Tales New Courses") was released. For the first time an instrument other than the guitar was used on a José Afonso album. For this album he was awarded the prize for best album of the year by Casa da Imprensa, a distinction he would repeat in 1970 and 1971. His fourth and last son, Pedro, was also born in 1969.

In 1970, Afonso released the album Traz Outro Amigo Também ("Bring Another Friend as Well"), which was recorded in London at the Pye Studios. It was the first album without frequent collaborator Rui Pato, who had been forbidden to travel by the Portugal's secret police. On 21 March, Casa da Imprensa (representing the Portuguese press) gave Afonso an honorary award for his "high quality work as a singer and composer and for his decisive influence upon Portuguese popular music". He participated in an international festival in Cuba.

At the end of 1971, the album Cantigas do Maio ("Songs of May") was released. The album was recorded at Château d'Hérouville, near Paris. This album is generally considered the best album of his career. In 1972, he released the album Eu Vou Ser Como a Toupeira ("I Will Be Just Like The Mole"), recorded in Madrid at the Cellada Studios.

In 1973, José Afonso continued his "pilgrimage", singing all over Portugal. Many of his appearances were forcibly cancelled by the PIDE/DGS. In April he was arrested and sentenced to 20 days in the Caxias prison (a facility used mostly to jail political prisoners). In the prison he wrote the poem Era Um Redondo Vocábulo. For Christmas, he released the album Venham Mais Cinco ("Let Five More Come"), recorded in Paris and on which José Mário Branco collaborated. Janine de Waleyne from the Blue Stars of France, a prominent vocalist in French chanson, guested on the title track.

On 29 March 1974, Afonso participated in a concert event at the Coliseu dos Recreios in Lisbon, called "First Meeting of the Portuguese Song" (Portuguese: Primeiro Encontro da Canção Portuguesa). This was an event sponsored by Casa da Imprensa in which several folk singer-songwriters and musicians with anti-Estado Novo inclinations participated. The state censorship still operated in the event, and Afonso was forbidden from performing some of his songs with more political messages, such as "Venham Mais Cinco" and "A Morte Saiu à Rua". "Grândola, Vila Morena", however, was not seen as a subversive song and was allowed to be performed. Almost one month later, on 25 April 1974, the Portuguese Estado Novo regime was overthrown in a nearly bloodless military coup, known as the Carnation Revolution. "Grândola, Vila Morena" was one of the two songs used as a radio-broadcast signal by the Portuguese Armed Forces Movement during their coup operation and is considered ever since the anthem of the revolution.

=== 1974–1980: Revolutionary period ===
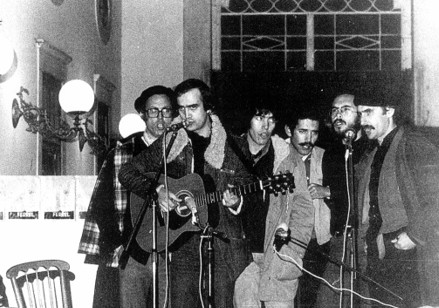
José Afonso (first from the left), alongside Fausto Bordalo Dias, Sérgio Godinho, Vitorino and others, in 1979

In December 1974, Afonso released the album Coro dos Tribunais ("Courthouse Chorus"), which was recorded in London, again at the Pye Studios, with musical arrangements by Fausto Bordalo Dias. The album includes two Brechtian songs, composed in Mozambique in the period between 1964 and 1967: "Coro dos Tribunais" and "Eu Marchava de Dia e de Noite".

From 1974 to 1975 he became directly involved in the popular revolutionary movements. The PREC (Ongoing Revolutionary Process) became his passion. He performed on 11 March 1975 (the day of a failed coup led by António de Spínola) in the RALIS, a leftist military stronghold. Afonso established a collaboration with the far-left movement LUAR (Revolutionary Action and Unity League). LUAR released his single "Viva o Poder Popular" (Hail to the People's Power). In Italy, the revolutionary organizations Lotta Continua, Il Manifesto and Avanguardia Operaia released the album República, recorded in Rome on 30 September and 1 October 1975. The money received from the sales of the album went to support the striking workers of the newspaper República.

In 1976 he supported Otelo Saraiva de Carvalho's presidential candidacy. Otelo was an important commander of the Carnation Revolution military operations, and Afonso would support him again in 1980. He released the album Com as Minhas Tamanquinhas ("With My Little Clogs").

The album Enquanto Há Força ("While There is Strength"), released in 1978, another collaboration with Fausto, shows some of Afonso's concerns about colonialism and imperialism and is also a critique of the Catholic Church. It includes the participation of other Portuguese artists such as Adriano Correia de Oliveira and Sérgio Godinho.

In 1979 the album Fura Fura ("Drill Drill") was released, with the collaboration of Júlio Pereira and the band Trovante. It contains eight songs that were meant for theater plays. He participated in the Anti-Eurovision Festival in Brussels.

=== 1980–1987: Final years ===
In 1981, after two years out of the spotlight, Afonso returned to his Coimbra roots with the album Fados de Coimbra e Outras Canções ("Coimbra fados and other songs"). He played in Paris at the Théâtre de la Ville.

In 1982 he started developing the first symptoms of amyotrophic lateral sclerosis, a severe disease that would affect him for the rest of his life. He played in Bruges at the Printemps Festival.

On 23 January 1983, Afonso, already weakened by the disease, played a sold-out show at the Coliseu dos Recreios in Lisbon. This show was recorded and immortalized in the live album Ao Vivo no Coliseu, released later that year. Afonso's last concert was on 25 May 1983, at the Coliseu do Porto, in Porto. At the end of 1983 he released the album Como Se Fora Seu Filho ("As If He Was His Son") The city of Coimbra awarded him its Golden Medal of the City. "Thank you Zeca, come back whenever you wish, this is your home", the mayor of Coimbra, Mendes Silva, told him; to which Afonso replied "I don't want to become an institution, but I feel very grateful for the homage". The President of Portugal Ramalho Eanes wanted to bestow upon him the Order of Liberty, but Afonso refused to fill in the papers. Also in 1983 Afonso was reinstated in his official teaching position, whence he had been expelled in 1968; he was sent to a school in Azeitão to teach History and Portuguese. His disease worsened.

In 1985 his last album, Galinhas do Mato ("Guineafowls"), was released. Afonso was unable to sing all the songs on the album, being replaced by Luís Represas, Helena Vieira, Janita Salomé, José Mário Branco, Né Ladeiras and Marta Salomé. Musical arrangements were done by Júlio Pereira and Fausto.

In 1986 he supported the presidential candidacy of Maria de Lourdes Pintasilgo, a progressive Catholic woman; she was not elected.

José Afonso died in Setúbal at 3 a.m. on 23 February 1987, aged 57, from complications of his sclerosis. His funeral in Setúbal occurred the following day and was attended by more than 30,000 people. The procession took two hours to cover 1,300 meters. His coffin was covered with a red flag with no symbols, as he had wished, and it was borne by, among others, his fellow musicians Sérgio Godinho, Júlio Pereira, José Mário Branco, Luís Cília and Francisco Fanhais. Afonso is buried in the Nossa Senhora da Piedade cemetery in Setúbal.

== Legacy ==
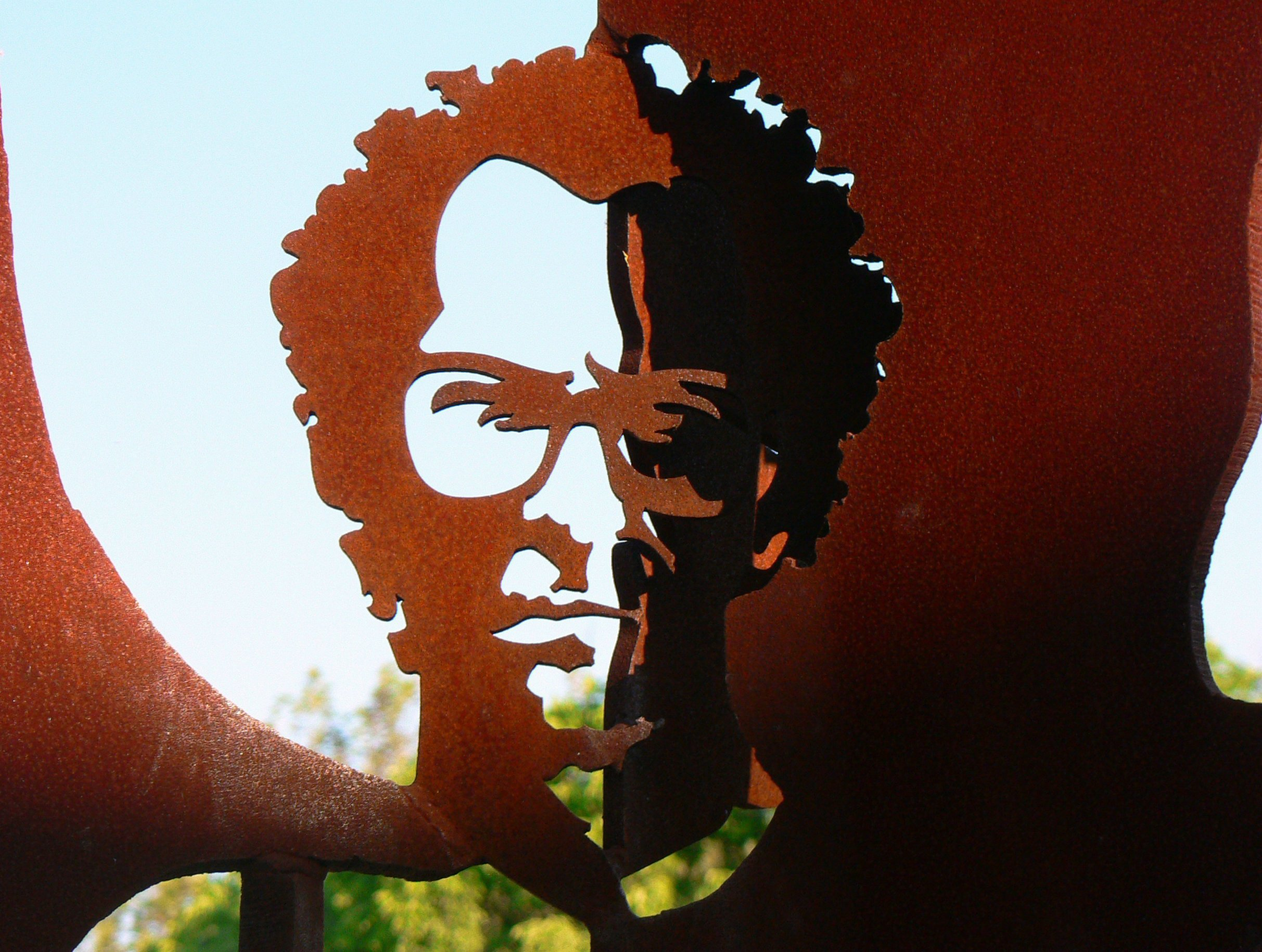
Monument in homage to Zeca in Grândola

On 18 November 1987, the Associação José Afonso was created with the objective of fulfilling Afonso's intentions in the areas of Portuguese music and art.

In 1991, the city of Amadora inaugurated a 3.7 metres (12 ft) statue of José Afonso in the city's Central Park.

On 30 June 1994, as part of Lisboa-94, European Capital of Culture, a festival in homage to José Afonso took place. Many Portuguese musicians, both veterans and younger artists, joined in the tribute festival, called "Filhos da Madrugada" ("Children of Dawn", the title of one of Afonso's most famous songs). Earlier that year, BMG had released an album with the same title as the festival, and with the same artists performing their own versions of Afonso's songs. Performers at this event included Brigada Victor Jara, Censurados, Delfins, Diva, Entre Aspas, Essa Entente, Frei Fado D'El Rei, GNR, Madredeus, Mão Morta, Opus Ensemble, Peste & Sida, Resistência, Ritual Tejo, Sérgio Godinho, Sétima Legião, Sitiados, Tubarões, UHF, Vozes da Rádio, and Xutos & Pontapés. Thirteen years earlier, Afonso had remarked that "If rock is the musical style that the young prefer, then we should ask for good quality rock music".

In 1995 José Mário Branco, Amélia Muge, and João Afonso, José Afonso's nephew, released another album in homage to Afonso, called Maio, Maduro Maio, that included many of his songs and two previously unreleased ones, "Entre Sodoma e Gomorra" and "Nem Sempre os Dias São Dias Passados".

For the 10th anniversary of Afonso's death, in 1997, EMI released for the first time in CD format the 1964 album Baladas e Canções.

In 1998, Vitorino and Janita Salomé took part in a concert in homage to José Afonso, included in Expo'98's programme.

In 2007 he was elected the 29th Greatest Portuguese.

== Discography ==
=== Studio albums ===
- Baladas e Canções (1964)
- Cantares do Andarilho (1968)
- Contos Velhos Rumos Novos (1969)
- Traz Outro Amigo Também (1970)
- Cantigas do Maio (1971)
- Eu Vou Ser Como a Toupeira (1972)
- Venham Mais Cinco (1973)
- Coro dos Tribunais (1974)
- Com as Minhas Tamanquinhas (1976)
- Enquanto Há Força (1978)
- Fura Fura (1979)
- Fados de Coimbra e Outras Canções (1981)
- Como Se Fora Seu Filho (1983)
- Galinhas do Mato (1985)

=== Live albums ===
- José Afonso in Hamburg (1982)
- Ao Vivo no Coliseu (1983)

=== Extended plays ===
- Fados de Coimbra (1956)
- Balada do Outono (1960)
- Baladas de Coimbra (1962)
- Dr. José Afonso em Baladas de Coimbra (1963)

=== Posthumous releases ===
- Os Vampiros (1987)
- De Capa e Batina (1996)
