= Sérgio Godinho =

Portuguese singer-songwriter, composer, actor, poet and author (born 1945)

Sérgio Godinho OL
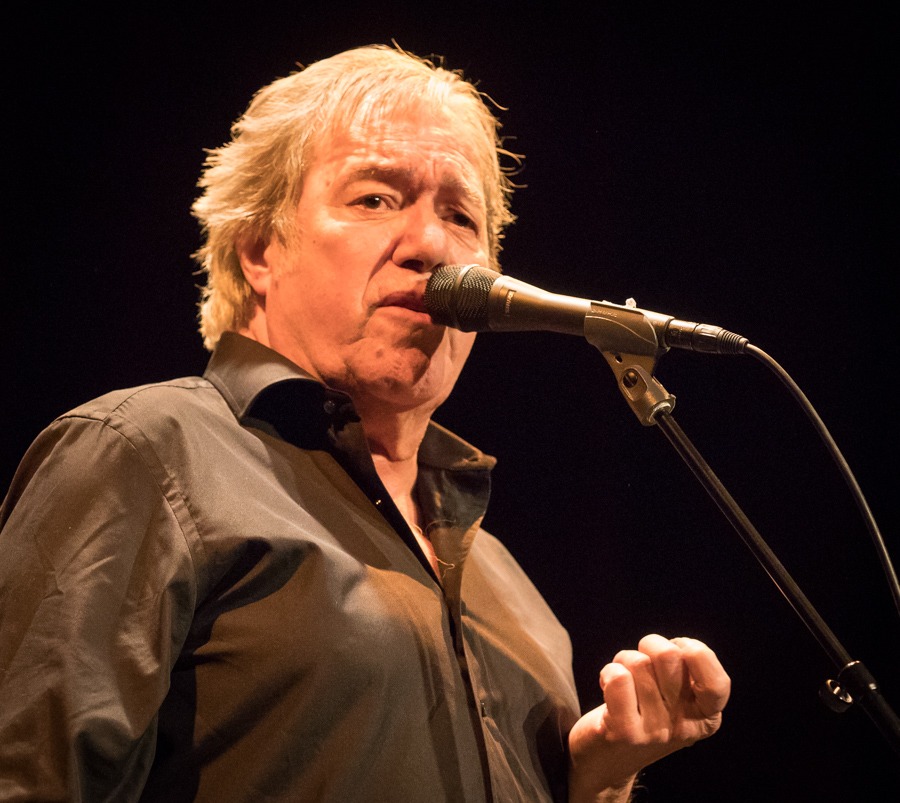
- Sérgio Godinho in Oslo, in 2017

Background information
- Born: Sérgio de Barros Godinho; 31 August 1945 (age 81); Porto, Portugal
- Genres: Folk; protest song; folk rock; rock
- Instruments: Vocals, guitar
- Years active: 1971–present
- Labels: Guilda da Música; Orfeu; Diapasão; Philips Records; Polygram; EMI; Universal Music

Sérgio de Barros Godinho OL (Portuguese pronunciation: [ˈsɛɾʒiu ɣuˈðiɲu]; born 31 August 1945) is a Portuguese singer-songwriter, composer, actor, poet and author.

Considered one of the most influential popular musicians in Portugal, Godinho started his music career singing folk songs of música de intervenção (Portuguese protest songs) while in exile, in the years preceding the Carnation Revolution of 1974 in Portugal, and is regarded as one of the genre's major figures.

Besides his music career, Godinho is also a stage and film actor, and has released poetry and fiction books.

== Early life ==
Sérgio Godinho was born in Porto on 31 August 1945. He bought his first acoustic guitar when he was 15 years-old.

He lived in Porto during his youth. He started by studying economics in university, by recommendation from his father, but decided to quit on his second year. At the age of 20, he decided to leave Portugal, motivated by a desire of emancipation and also to avoid the conscription for the Portuguese Colonial War. He went to study psychology in Geneva, where he had Jean Piaget as one of his professors. After two years, in 1967, still unsatisfied with the path chosen, Godinho left the course and decided to dedicate himself to the arts.

In the following months, Godinho traveled across different places in France, Italy and the Netherlands. He then moved to Paris, where he worked as a stage actor, being cast for the French version of the musical Hair, and started writing songs. In Paris, he befriended José Mário Branco, a fellow Portuguese songwriter, who is nowadays also regarded as one of the greatest singer-songwriters of música de intervenção. He also there met his first wife, Sheila, while working on Hair. He was living in Paris during the May 68 protests.

After his first recordings in 1971, he did more travels in the Netherlands, Canada and Brazil. In Brazil, he joined the theater group Living Theatre, and was arrested for two and a half months after taking part in a protest show in Minas Gerais. He returned to Paris to perform in another season of Hair and then moved to the Netherlands for a short time.

Godinho lived in Canada, specifically in Montreal and Vancouver, from 1972 to 1974, with his partner Sheila. He returned to Portugal in September 1974, some months after the Carnation Revolution in Portugal.

== Music career ==
=== 1971–1974: The exile years ===
Sérgio Godinho started his music career in Paris, composing and recording with José Mário Branco in 1971. Both Godinho and Branco's first albums were recorded at the same time, at the Strawberry Studio in Château d'Hérouville. Godinho wrote the lyrics to four tracks in Branco's first album, Mudam-se os Tempos, Mudam-se as Vontades, released that same year. Branco produced and played in Godinho's first EP and first album.

Godinho's first release was the EP Romance de um Dia na Estrada in 1971. The four songs in this EP would also appear in his first album, Os Sobreviventes, which was recorded in April 1971 and was released in 1972 in Portugal. He recorded his second album Pré-Histórias in 1972, and it was likewise released in the following year in Portugal.

Because of the political messages in some of its lyrics, Os Sobreviventes and Pré-Historias were targeted by the censorship of the Estado Novo regime, at a time in which the censorship from Marcelo Caetano's administration paradoxically wished to become softer but also more controlling of pop music that criticized the regime. Os Sobreviventes was removed from stores several times.

Godinho was living in Canada when the Carnation Revolution happened in Portugal. He started the recording of his third album in Canada and later finished it in Portugal.

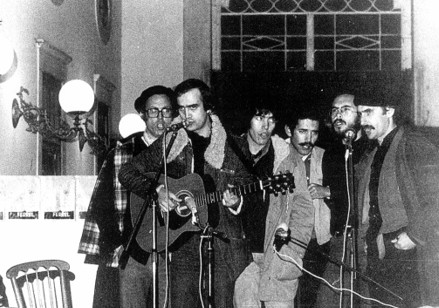
Sérgio Godinho (third from the left), alongside José Afonso, Fausto Bordalo Dias, Vitorino and others, in 1979

=== 1974–1980: Return to Portugal ===
Godinho returned to Portugal in September 1974. He finished and released his third album, À Queima-Roupa, that year.

In 1976, he released De Pequenino Se Torce O Destino, an album with production by Fausto Bordalo Dias, with lyrics marked by Portugal's transition to democracy in 1975.

His last albums in the 1970s are Pano-Cru, from 1978, and Campolide, from 1979. In these albums, Godinho starts a transition to less politically charged lyrics and singing more about everyday life.

=== 1980–2000 ===
Godinho composed the soundtrack for José Fonseca e Costa's film Kilas, o Mau da Fita (1980), which was released in 1980.

In 1981 he released Canto da Boca. The album was an award-winning success.

Godinho wished to collaborate with Brazilian musicians in his following album, whom he considered a source of inspiration. His 1983 album Coincidências features the Brazilian musicians Milton Nascimento, Chico Buarque and Ivan Lins.

In 1984 Godinho released the album Salão de Festas, where he started to incorporate elements of light jazz in his songs. The exploration of jazz sounds continued in his following album, Na Vida Real (1986), which contained a more nocturnal ambiance.

In 1988 he released his first and only album of children's music, titled Sérgio Godinho Canta Com Os Amigos do Gaspar, containing songs he created for RTP's children show Os Amigos do Gaspar.

In 1989 he released Aos Amores. It was followed by his first live album, Escritor de Canções, in 1990.

In the 1990s Godinho started to reduce the pace at which he released studio albums. In 1993 he released the album Tinta Permanente. In this album, Godinho takes a step towards a more modern sound, bringing his music to a new generation. It can be considered the beginning of his "modern era".

Godinho began collaborations with Portuguese artists of a newer generation during the 1990s. He shared the stage with bands such as Sitiados and Da Weasel. His 1997 album Domingo no Mundo had contributions by Sitiados, Rádio Macau and Kalu from Xutos & Pontapés.

=== 2000–present ===
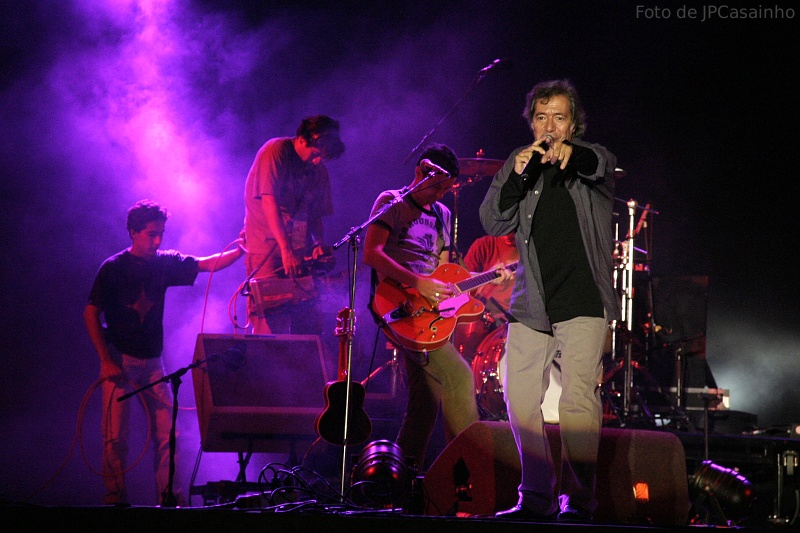
Sérgio Godinho performing at the Avante! Festival in 2004

In 2000 Godinho released the album Lupa. In 2001 he released a collaboration album with the band Clã, with songs from both parts. Another collaboration album with various artists followed in 2003, titled O Irmão do Meio. This album revisited several of Godinho's classics and included contributions by Brazilian and Portuguese artists such as Caetano Veloso, Gabriel o Pensador, Rui Veloso, Jorge Palma, Xutos & Pontapés, Teresa Salgueiro and Camané.

In 2006 he released the album Ligação Directa. In 2009, Godinho reunited with José Mário Branco and Fausto Bordalo Dias for the a series of concerts named Três Cantos. The trio did two shows at the Campo Pequeno in Lisbon, and two other at the Coliseu do Porto in Porto. Recordings of the Campo Pequeno shows were released in the live album Três Cantos: Ao Vivo.

In 2011 Godinho released the album Mútuo Consentimento. During 2015 and 2016, Godinho played shows together with Jorge Palma. The show at the Theatro Circo in Braga was released in the live album Juntos – Ao Vivo no Theatro Circo, in 2015.

His latest studio album, Nação Valente, was released in 2018. He has continued to perform including at Paredes de Coura Festival in 2026.

== Personal life ==
Sérgio Godinho has three children.

== Discography ==
=== Studio albums ===
- Os Sobreviventes (1972)
- Pré-Histórias (1973)
- À Queima-Roupa (1974)
- De Pequenino Se Torce O Destino (1976)
- Pano Cru (1978)
- Campolide (1979)
- Kilas o Mau da Fita (original soundtrack) (1980)
- Canto da Boca (1981)
- Coincidências (1983)
- Salão de Festas (1984)
- Na Vida Real (1986)
- Sérgio Godinho Canta Com Os Amigos do Gaspar (1988)
- Aos Amores (1989)
- Tinta Permanente (1993)
- Domingo no Mundo (1997)
- Lupa (2000)
- Ligação Directa (2006)
- Mútuo Consentimento (2011)
- Nação Valente (2018)

=== Extended plays ===
- Romance de um Dia na Estrada (1971)

=== Live albums ===
- Escritor de Canções (1990)
- Noites Passadas: O Melhor De Sérgio Godinho Ao Vivo (1995)
- Rivolitz: O Melhor De Sérgio Godinho Ao Vivo 2 (1998)
- Nove e Meia no Maria Matos (2008)
- Ao Vivo no São Luiz (2020)

=== Collaboration albums ===
- A Confederação (original soundtrack, with José Mário Branco and Fausto) (1978)
- Afinidades (live album, with Clã) (2001)
- O Irmão do Meio (with various artists) (2003)
- Três Cantos: Ao Vivo (with José Mário Branco and Fausto) (2009)
- Caríssimas Canções (live album, with Hélder Gonçalves, Manuela Azevedo and Nuno Rafael) (2013)
- Juntos - Ao Vivo no Theatro Circo (live album, with Jorge Palma) (2015)

=== Compilation albums ===
- Era Uma Vez Um Rapaz (1985)
- Biografias do Amor (2001)
- Setenta e Um - Oitenta e Seis: O Melhor de Sérgio Godinho (2004)
- 1989 - 2014: O Melhor de Sérgio Godinho (2017)

== Bibliography ==
- O Pequeno Livro dos Medos (1991)
- A Caixa (1993)
- O Sangue Por Um Fio (2009)
- O Primeiro Gomo da Tangerina (with Madalena Matoso) (2010)
- Vidadupla (2014)
- Coração Mais Que Perfeito (2017)
- Estocolmo (2019)
