= José Mário Branco =

Portuguese singer-songwriter (1942–2019)

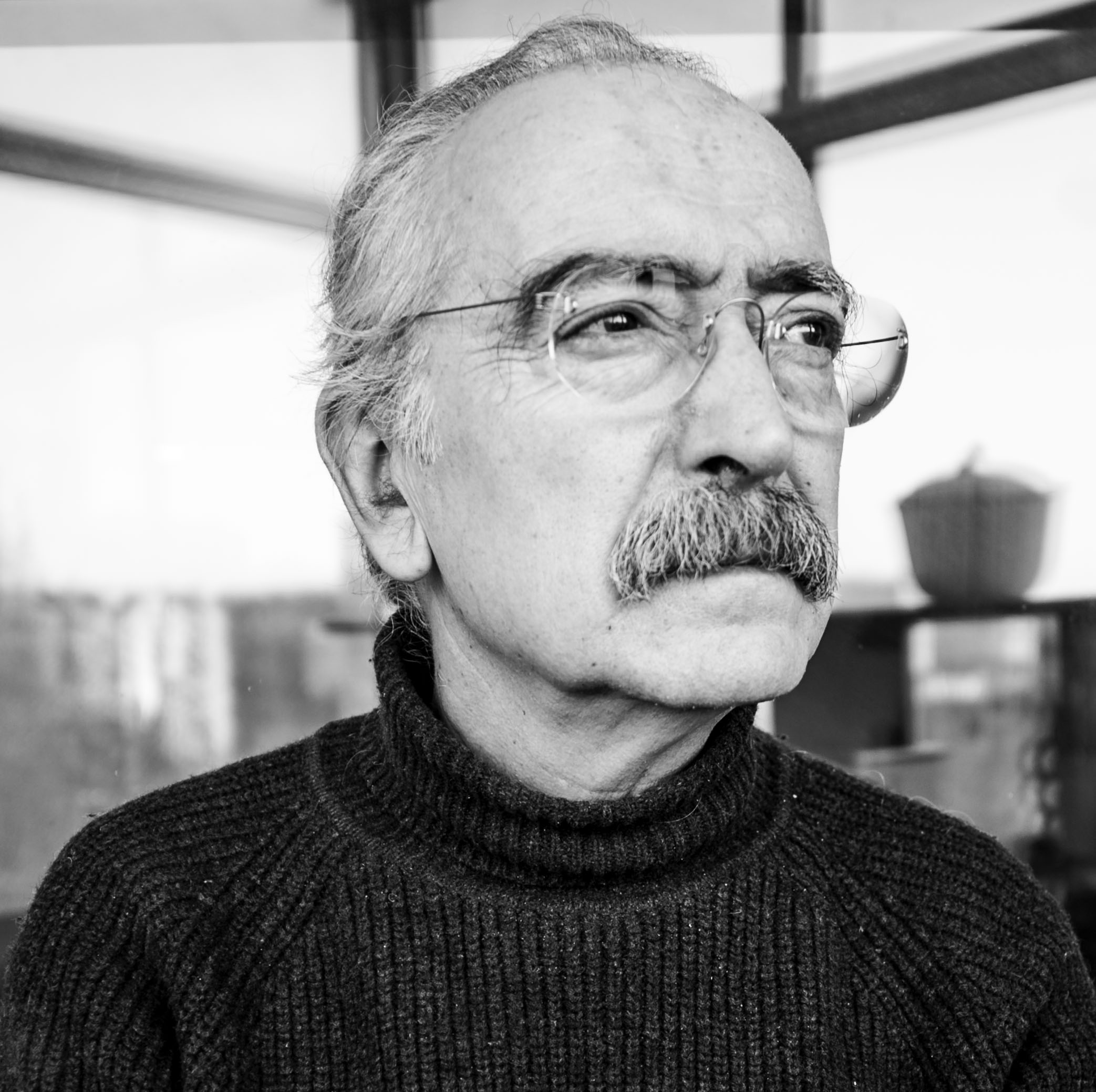
- Branco in 2011
- Born: José Mário Monteiro Guedes Branco; 25 May 1942; Porto, Portugal
- Died: 19 November 2019 (aged 77); Lisbon, Portugal
- Occupations: Singer; songwriter; composer; actor; record producer
- Years active: 1963–2019
- Musical career
- Genres: Folk; Protest song
- Instruments: Vocals; guitar; piano

José Mário Branco (25 May 1942 – 19 November 2019) was a Portuguese singer-songwriter, actor, and record producer.

== Biography ==
José Mário Branco was born in Porto, the son of primary school teachers, and became politically involved in the early 1960s. This political activity during the dictatorship in Portugal and his opposition to the colonial war led him to seek exile in France in 1963. There he would eventually meet and collaborate with musicians such as Sérgio Godinho and Zeca Afonso, whose records he produced and recorded at the Château d'Hérouville studios.

After the 1974 revolution Branco returned to Portugal and was the founder of the music ensemble GAC – Grupo de Acção Cultural. He composed a number of music scores for theatre plays.

Branco died of a stroke on 19 November 2019 at the age of 77.

== Discography ==
- Seis cantigas de Amigo (EP, Arquivos Sonoros Portugueses, 1969) EP
- Ronda do Soldadinho (Single, Ed. Autor, 1970) Single
- Mudam-se os tempos, mudam-se as vontades (LP, Guilda da Música, 1971) LP/CD
- Margem de Certa Maneira (LP, Guilda da Música, 1972) LP/CD
- A Mãe (LP, 1978) LP
- O Ladrão do Pão (EP, Diapasão, 1978)
- Ser solidário (2LP, Edisom, 1982)
- FMI (Maxi, Edisom, 1982)
- Qual é a tua ó meu / S. João do Porto (Single, Edisom, 1982)
- A Noite (LP, UPAV, 1985)
- Correspondências (LP, UPAV, 1990) LP/CD
- José Mário Branco ao vivo em 1997 (CD, 1997) CD
- Canções escolhidas 71/97 (CD, 1999) CD (Colectânea)
- Resistir é vencer (CD, 2004) CD
- Inéditos (1967–1999) (CD, 2018)

=== As a producer ===
- José Afonso – Cantigas do Maio (1971) LP, Arnaldo Trindade, Orfeu
- José Afonso – Venham mais cinco (1973) LP, Arnaldo Trindade, Orfeu
- José Afonso – Fura Fura (1979) LP, Arnaldo Trindade, Orfeu
- Quarteto Música Em Si – Página em branco (1980) Songle, Arnaldo Trindade, Orfeu
- José Afonso – Galinhas do mato (1985) LP, Transmedia, Schiu!(Em colaboração com Júlio Pereira e José Afonso).
- Janita Salomé – Olho de fogo (1987) LP, Transmedia, Schiu!
- Carlos do Carmo – Que se fez homem de cantar (1990) LP, Polygram, Philips (2 temas)
- Amélia Muge – Todos os dias... (1994) CD, Sony Música, Columbia
- Gaiteiros de Lisboa – Invasões bárbaras (1995) CD, Farol
- Camané – Uma Noite de Fados (1995) CD, EMI – Valentim de Carvalho
- Vários Artistas – Bom dia, Benjamim (1995) CD, Movieplay (José Mário Branco foi responsável pela orquestração, sonoplastia e direcção musical do álbum, sendo que também foi o author da introdução. "Emprestou" também a sua voz à personagem do avô de Benjamim. Foi também responsável pela orquestração e direcção musical do espectáculo apresentado no CCB, em 1998.)
- Amélia Muge – Taco a taco (1998) CD, Polygram, Mercury(6 temas)
- Camané – Na Linha da Vida (1998) CD, EMI – Valentim de Carvalho
- Camané – Esta Coisa da Alma (2000) CD, EMI – Valentim de Carvalho.
- Camané – Pelo Dia Dentro (2001) CD, EMI
- Canto Nono – O Porto a 8 vozes (2003) CD, EMI
- Camané – Sempre de Mim (2008) CD, EMI
- Camané – Do amor e dos dias (2010) CD, EMI
