= Globe de Cristal Awards =

French art and culture awards

Globes de Cristal Awards
- Awarded for: Excellence in art and culture
- Country: France
- Presented by: Press Association
- First award: 2006
- Website: globesdecristal.com

The Globes de Cristal Awards (English: Crystal Globe Awards) is a set of awards bestowed by members of the French Press Association recognizing excellence in home art and culture. The annual formal ceremony and dinner at which the awards are presented happens each February.

The 1st Globes de Cristal were in 2006 in Paris. The 2014 ceremony was held at Le Lido cabaret on 10 March 2014 and was hosted by Valérie Bénaïm, who is the first woman to host the show, without being a co-host.

== Background ==
The "Globe de Cristal Awards" categories are: movies, actors, actresses, theater, concerts, novels, singers, TV series, exhibitions and fashion designers.

=== Categories ===
==== Cinema and television ====
- Best Film
- Best TV movie/TV Series
- Best Actor
- Best Actress
- Best TV Show

==== Music ====
- Best Male Singer
- Best Female Singer

==== Scene ====
- Best Play (Including Dance)
- Best Musical Play (Including Opera)
- Best One-Man-Show

==== Literature ====
- Best Literary Piece

==== Architecture, paint, sculpture and fashion ====
- Best Exposition
- Best Fashion Designer

==== Honorary ====
- Honor Globe (Globe d'Honneur)

== Ceremonies ==
Edition	Date	President(s)	Host(s)	Channel
1st Globes de Cristal Award	13 March 2006	Patrick Poivre d'Arvor	Patrick Poivre d'Arvor	/
2nd Globes de Cristal Award	5 February 2007	Pierre Lescure	André Manoukian & Élisabeth Quin	Paris Première
3rd Globes de Cristal Award	11 February 2008	Bernard-Henri Lévy	Xavier de Moulins & Élisabeth Quin	Paris Première
4th Globes de Cristal Award	2 February 2009	Jacques Attali	Jean-Luc Delarue & Carole Gaessler	France 3
5th Globes de Cristal Award	8 February 2010	Denis Olivennes	Anne Roumanoff & Patrick Poivre d'Arvor	Virgin 17
6th Globes de Cristal Award	7 February 2011	Franz-Olivier Giesbert	Yves Lecoq	France 3
7th Globes de Cristal Award	6 February 2012	Nicolas Demorand	Julien Lepers	France 3
8th Globes de Cristal Award	4 February 2013	Hervé Bourges	Véronique Mounier & Yves Lecoq	Chérie 25
9th Globes de Cristal Award	10 March 2014	Guillaume Durand	Valérie Bénaïm	D17
10th Globes de Cristal Award	13 April 2015	Christine Kelly	Justine Fraioli & Bernard Montiel	D17
Canceled	8 February 2016	/	/	/
11th Globes de Cristal Award	30 January 2017	Catherine Deneuve	Estelle Denis & Artus	C8
12th Globes de Cristal Award	12 February 2018	Isabelle Huppert		

=== 2009 ===
The ceremony takes place at the Lido and is broadcast live on France 3, February at 11PM

- President of the jury : Jacques Attali

Honor Globe (Globe d'honneur)

- Roberto Alagna

Special mention from the jury

- Guillaume Depardieu (posthumous)

Film/ Television

- Best Film : Mesrine : L'Instinct de mort
- Best actor : Vincent Cassel for Mesrine : L'Instinct de mort
- Best actress : Sylvie Testud for Sagan
- Best TV movie or TV show : Sagan
- Best documentary : 9/3 : Mémoire d'un territoire by Yamina Benguigui

Music

- Best female performer : Anaïs
- Best male performer : Julien Doré

Theater

- Best opera dance performance : Blanche-Neige by Angelin Preljocaj
- Best play : La Vie devant soi, staging by Didier Long at the théâtre de l'Œuvre
- Best musical : Le Soldat rose by Louis Chedid and Dominique Burgaug
- Best one-man-show : Valérie Lemercier at the Palace

Literature

- Best novel or essay : Où on va, papa ? by Jean-Louis Fournier
- Best graphic novel : Une vie de chat by Philippe Geluck

Arts

- Best exhibit : Picasso et les Maîtres at the Grand Palais
- Best architect or designer : Andrée Putman
- Best fashion designer : Isabelle Marant

The ceremony was replayed in the media especially for its controversy concerning a joke, considered vulgar, by Jean-Luc Delarue. At the moment he handed Yamina Benguigui her award, he asked the director: "Would you like for me to hold your globe?" adding afterwards "or your globes?" (her wearing a low-cut black dress that showed off part of her chest) along with a grimace. The public services host gave his apologies several days later

=== 2010 ===
The ceremony takes place at the Lido and is broadcast live on Virgin 17, February at 8:50PM.

- Chairman of the board : Denis Olivennes
- Masters of ceremony : Anne Roumanoff and Patrick Poivre d'Arvor

Honor globe (Globe d'honneur)
- Danielle Darrieux
- Crystal nugget : Alain Passard (chef)

Film

- Best Film : Un prophète by Jacques Audiard
- Best actor : Tahar Rahim for Un prophète
- Best actress : Isabelle Adjani for La Journée de la jupe
- Best TV movie or TV show : Pigalle, la nuit (Canal+)
- Best documentary : Apocalypse, la Seconde Guerre mondiale

Theater

- Best opera dance performance : La Flûte enchantée
- Best play : Des gens by Raymond Depardon and Zabou Breitman at the théâtre du Petit-Montparnasse
- Best musical : La Mélodie du bonheur at the théâtre du Châtelet
- Best one-man-show : Mother Fucker by Florence Foresti

Music

- Best female performer : Olivia Ruiz
- Best male performer : Benjamin Biolay

Literature

- Best novel : D'autres vies que la mienne by Emmanuel Carrère
- Best graphic novel : Happy sex by Zep

Arts

- Best exhibit : Pierre Soulages at the Centre Georges-Pompidou
- Bestdesigner, architect or photographer : Philippe Starck
- Best fashion designer : Stefano Pilati for Yves Saint-Laurent

=== 2011 ===
The ceremony takes place at the Lido and is retransmitted in almost live recording on France 3, February at 8:45PM

- Chairman of the board : Franz-Olivier Giesbert
- Masters of ceremonies : Yves Lecoq

Honor globe (Globe d'honneur)
- Pierre Arditi

Film / Television

- Best film : L'Arnacœur by Pascal Chaumeil
- Best actor : Michael Lonsdale for Des hommes et des dieux
- Best actress : Kristin Scott Thomas for Elle s'appelait Sarah
- Best TV movie or TV show : Carlos by Olivier Assayas

Theater

- Best play : Miam-miam by Édouard Baer
- Best musical : Mamma Mia ! at the théâtre Mogador
- Best one-man-show : Dernière avant Vegas by Audrey Lamy

Music

- Best female performer : Yael Naïm
- Best male performer : Ben l'Oncle Soul

Literature

- Best novel or essay : Le Quai de Ouistreham by Florence Aubenas

Arts

- Best exhibit : Basquiat at the Musée d'art moderne de la ville de Paris
- Best fashion designer : Jean-Paul Gaultier

=== 2012 ===
The ceremony was broadcast live from Lido on France 3, February at 11:40PM.

- Chairman of the board : Nicolas Demorand
- Masters of ceremony : Julien Lepers

Honor globe (Globe d'honneur)

- Éric Reinhardt

Film / Television

- Best Film : Intouchables by Olivier Nakache and Éric Toledano
- Best actor : Omar Sy for Intouchables
- Best actress : Karin Viard and Marina Fois for Polisse
- Best TV movie or TV show : Flics by Thierry Petit, Simon Jablonka and Olivier Marchal

Theater

- Best play : Un fil à la patte by Georges Feydeau, staging by Jérôme Deschamps at the Comédie-Française
- Bestmusical : Dracula, l'amour plus fort que la mort, staging by Kamel Ouali at the Palais des Sports de Paris
- Best one-man-show : Liberté (très) surveillée by Stéphane Guillon

Music

- Best female performer : Izia
- Best male performer : Louis Bertignac

Literature

- Best novel or essay : Tout, tout de suite by Morgan Sportès

Arts

- Best exhibit : Exhibitions : L'Invention du sauvage at the musée du quai Branly
- Best fashion designer : Guillaume Henry for Carven

=== 2013 ===
The ceremony was broadcast live from Lido on Chérie 25, February at 8:45PM.

- Chairman of the board : Hervé Bourges
- Master of ceremonies : Véronique Mounier and Yves Lecoq

Honor globe (Globe d'honneur)
- Abdou Diouf

Film/ Television

- Best film :
- Rust and Bone by Jacques Audiard
  - Les Adieux à la reine by Benoît Jacquot
  - Amour by Michael Haneke
  - Holy Motors by Leos Carax
  - Thérèse Desqueyroux by Claude Miller
- Best TV movie or TV show :
- Les Revenants by Fabrice Gobert (Canal+)
  - Bref by Kyan Khojandi (Canal+)
  - Engrenages by Alexandra Clert (Canal+)
  - Les Hommes de l'ombre by Dan Franck (France 2)
  - Kaboul Kitchen by Marc Victor, Allan Mauduit and Jean-Patrick Benes (Canal+)
- Best actor :
- Jérémie Renier for Cloclo
  - Gilles Lellouche for Thérèse Desqueyroux
  - Vincent Lindon for Quelques heures de printemps
  - Matthias Schoenaerts for Rust and Bone
  - Jean-Louis Trintignant for Amour
- Best actress :
- Marion Cotillard for Rust and Bone
  - Émilie Dequenne for À perdre la raison
  - Déborah François for Populaire
  - Izïa Higelin for Bad Girl
  - Emmanuelle Riva for Amour

Theater

- Best play :
- Inconnu à cette adresse, staging by Michèle Lévy-Braun at the théâtre Antoine
  - Les Liaisons dangereuses, staging by John Malkovich at the théâtre de l'Atelier
  - Le Père, staging by Ladislas Chollat at the théâtre Hébertot
  - Race, staging by Pierre Laville at the Comédie des Champs-Élysées
  - Un chapeau de paille d'Italie, staging by Giorgio Barberio Corsetti at the Comédie-Française
- Best one-man-show :
- Michael Gregorio for En concerts at the Bataclan
  - Florence Foresti for Foresti Party at Bercy
  - Bérengère Krief at the théâtre du Point-Virgule
  - Alex Lutz at the Point-Virgule theater
  - Gaspard Proust at the théâtre du Rond-Point
- Best musical :
- 1789: Les Amants de la Bastille by Giuliano Peparini, Dove Attia and Albert Cohen at the Palais des Sports de Paris
  - Avenue Q, adaptation by Bruno Gaccio and Dominique Guillo at Bobino
  - Billie Holiday by Éric-Emmanuel Schmitt and Viktor Lazlo at the Théâtre Rive Gauche
  - Salut les copains by Stéphane Jarny and Pascal Forneri at the Folies Bergère
  - Sister Act by Carline Brouwer at the théâtre Mogador

Music

- Best female performer :
- Olivia Ruiz for Le Calme et la Tempête (Polydor)
  - Daphné for Treize chansons by Barbara (Naïve Records)
  - Lou Doillon for Places (Universal Music Group)
  - Imany for The Shape of a Broken Heart (Think Zik)
  - Nolwenn Leroy for Ô filles de l'eau (Universal Music Group)
- Best male performer :
- Raphaël for Super-Welter (EMI Group)
  - Benjamin Biolay for Vengeance (Naïve Records)
  - Stephan Eicher for L'Envolée (Disques Barclay)
  - Johnny Hallyday for L'Attente (Warner Music Group)
  - Sexion d'Assaut for L'Apogée (Wati B)

Literature

- Best novel or essay :
- Les Pays by Marie-Hélène Lafon (Buchet/Chastel)
  - Les Lisières by Olivier Adam (Flammarion)
  - La Liste de mes envies by Grégoire Delacourt (published by Jean-Claude Lattès)
  - Les Proies : Dans le harem de Kadhafi by Annick Cojean (published Grasset & Fasquelle)
  - La Vérité sur l'affaire Harry Quebert by Joël Dicker (éditions de Fallois)

Arts

- Meilleur créateur de mode :
- Barbara Bui
  - Barbara Boccara et Sharon Krief
  - André Courrèges
  - Raf Simons
  - Hedi Slimane
- Best exhibit :
- Salvador Dalí at the Centre Georges-Pompidou
  - Adel Abdessemed at the Centre Georges-Pompidou
  - Canaletto at the Jacquemart-André museum
  - Design en Afrique, s'asseoir, se coucher et rêver at the musée Dapper
  - Edward Hopper at the Grand Palais

=== 2014 ===
The ceremony is broadcast live from Lido on D17, le March at 10:30PM. It got together viewers (0.5% on either side of the audience)

- President of the jury : Guillaume Durand
- Master of ceremonies : Valérie Bénaïm

Honor globe (Globe d'honneur)

Yan Pei-Ming

Film/ Television

- Best film :
- 9 mois ferme by Albert Dupontel
  - Les Garçons et Guillaume, à table ! by Guillaume Gallienne
  - Grand Central by Rebecca Zlotowski
  - Suzanne by Katell Quillévéré
  - La Vie d'Adèle by Abdellatif Kechiche
- Best TV movie or TV show :
- Tunnel by Dominik Moll and Ben Richards (Canal+)
  - Fais pas ci, fais pas ça by Anne Giafferi and Thierry Bizot (France 2)
  - Falco by Clothilde Jamin (TF1)
  - Tout est bon dans le cochon by Saïda Jawad (France 3)
  - Un village français by Frédéric Krivine, Philippe Triboit and Emmanuel Daucé (France 5)
- Best actor :
- Guillaume Gallienne for Les Garçons et Guillaume, à table !
  - Niels Arestrup for Quai d'Orsay
  - Albert Dupontel for 9 mois ferme
  - Grégory Gadebois for Mon âme par toi guérie
  - Fabrice Luchini for Alceste à bicyclette
- Best actress :
- Adèle Exarchopoulos for La Vie d'Adèle
  - Emmanuelle Seigner for La Vénus à la fourrure
  - Sandrine Kiberlain for 9 mois ferme
  - Bernadette Lafont for Paulette

Theater

- Best play :
- Nos femmes, staging by Richard Berry at the théâtre de Paris
  - La Liste de mes envies, staging by Anne Bouvier at the Ciné 13 Théâtre
  - La Locandiera, staging by Marc Paquien at the théâtre de l'Atelier
  - Nina, staging by Bernard Murat at the théâtre Édouard VII
  - Une heure de tranquillité, staging by Ladislas Chollat at the théâtre Antoine
- Best musical :
- Disco, staging by Agnès Boury and Stéphane Laporte at the Folies Bergère
  - Airnadette, staging by Pierre-François Martin-Laval at the Olympia
  - La Belle et la Bête, staging by Glenn Casale at the théâtre Mogador
  - My Fair Lady, staging by Robert Carsen at the théâtre du Châtelet
  - Spamalot, staging by Eric Idle at Bobino
- Best one-man-show :
- Gad Elmaleh for Sans tambour at the théâtre Marigny
  - Olivier de Benoist for Fournisseur d'excès at La Cigale
  - Bérengère Krief for théâtre du Point-Virgule
  - Alex Lutz at the Point-Virgule theater
  - Muriel Robin for Muriel Robin revient... tsoin tsoin ! (at the Palais des sports

Music

- Best female performer :
- Ayọ for Ticket to the World (Mercury Records)
  - Carla Bruni for Little French Songs (Universal Music Group)
  - HollySiz for My Name Is (East West)
  - Vanessa Paradis for Love Songs (Universal Music Group)
  - Zaz for Recto verso (EMI Group)
- Best male performer :
- Stromae for Racine carrée (Universal Music Group)
  - Bernard Lavilliers for Baron Samedi (Disques Barclay)
  - Julien Doré for LØVE (Columbia Records)
  - Vincent Delerme for Les Amants parallèles (Tôt ou tard)
  - Yodelice for Square Eyes (Mercury Records)

Literature

- Best novel or essay :
- La Cuisinière d'Himmler by Franz-Olivier Giesbert (éditions Gallimard)
  - Au revoir là-haut by Pierre Lemaitre (published by Albin Michel)
  - Le Cas Édouard Einstein by Laurent Seksik (Flammarion)
  - L'Invention de nos vies by Karine Tuil (published by Grasset & Fasquelle)
  - Sulak by Philippe Jaenada (published by Julliard)

Arts

- Best exhibit :
- Edward Hopper at the Grand Palais
  - Frida Kahlo / Diego Rivera, l'art en fusion at the Musée de l'Orangerie
  - Georges Braque at the Grand Palais
  - La Renaissance et le rêve at the Palais du Luxembourg
  - Roy Linchtenstein at the Centre Georges-Pompidou
- Best fashion designer :
- Isabel Marant
  - Jean-Charles de Castelbajac
  - Stephanie Renoma
  - Maxime Simoëns
  - Alexandre Vauthier

=== 2015 ===
The 10th edition of the awards ceremony took place on 13 April 2015 at the Lido in Paris. The ceremony was broadcast live on D17. It attracted 49,000 viewers in France (constituting 0.4% of the audience share).

- President of the Jury: Christine Kelly
- Hosts: Justine Fraoli and Bernard Montiel

==== Honorary Globe (Globe d'honneur) ====
- Charlie Hebdo

==== Film/ Television ====
Best Film

- Timbuktu by Abderrahmane Sissako
  - Two Days, One Night by Jean-Pierre and Luc Dardenne
  - Hippocrate by Thomas Lilti
  - La Famille Bélier by Eric Lartigau
  - Les Combattants by Thomas Cailley

Best TV movie or TV show

- Spiral (Season 5) — created by Alexandra Clert (Canal+)
  - La Loi — created by Fanny Burdino, Mazarine Pingeot and Samuel Doux, directed by Christian Faure (France2)
  - Mafiosa (Season 5) — created by Hugues Pagan and directed by Pierre Leccia (Canal+)
  - P'tit Quinquin — created by Bruno Dumont (Arte)
  - Résistance (Season 1) — created by Dan Franck, directed by David Delrieux and Miguel Courtois (TF1)

Best Actor

- Pierre Niney — Yves Saint Laurent
  - François Damiens – La Famille Bélier
  - Gaspard Ulliel – Saint Laurent
  - Guillaume Canet – Next Time I'll Aim for the Heart
  - Reda Kateb – Hippocrate

Best Actress

- Aïssa Maïga — Anything for Alice
  - Adèle Haenel – Les Combattants
  - Émilie Dequenne – Not My Type
  - Marion Cotillard – Two Days, One Night
  - Sandrine Kiberlain – Elle l'adore

==== Theatre ====
Best Play

- Ouh Ouh – Isabelle Mergault and Daive Cohen, staging by Patrice Leconte (Théâtre des Variétés)
  - La Colère du Tigre – by Philippe Madral, staging by Christophe Lidon (Théâtre Montparnasse)
  - Lucrèce Borgia — based on the play by Victor Hugo, staging by Denis Podalydès (Comédie Française)
  - Un dîner d'adieu – by Alexandre de La Patellière and Matthieu Delaporte, staging by Bernard Murat (Théâtre Edouard VII)
  - Trahisons – by Harold Pinter, staging by Frédéric Bélier-Garcia (Théâtre du Vieux Colombier/Comédie Française)

Best Musical

- Les Parapluies de Cherbourg – by Jacques Demy, staging by Vincent Vittoz, musical direction by Michel Legrand (Théâtre du Châtelet)
  - Le Bal des Vampires — by Michael Kunze and Jim Steinman, staging by Roman Polanski (Théâtre Mogador)
  - Love Circus – by Agnès Boury and by Stéphane Laporte, staging by Stéphane Jarny (Folies Bergère)
  - Mistinguett, reine des années folles — by Albert Cohen, Jacques Pessis and Ludovic-Alexandre Vidal, staging by François Chouquet (Casino de Paris)
  - Un Américain à Paris — adaptation and staging by Christopher Wheeldon (Théâtre du Châtelet)

Best One-Man-Show

- Nawell Madani — C'est moi la plus belge (Trianon)
  - Alex Lutz – (Bobino)
  - Florence Foresti – Madame Foresti (Théâtre du Chatelet)
  - Gad Elmaleh – 20 ans sur scène (Palais des sports)
  - Gaspard Proust – Gaspard Proust tapine (Théâtre de la Madeleine)

Best Actor

- Éric Elmosnino — Un dîner d'adieu by Alexandre de La Patellière and Matthieu Delaporte, staging by Bernard Murat (Théâtre Edouard VII)
  - Claude Brasseur – La Colère du Tigre by Philippe Madral, staging by Christophe Lidon (Théâtre Montparnasse)
  - Francis Huster – Le Joueur d'échecs by Stefan Zweig, adaptation by Eric-Emmanuel Schmitt, staging Steve Suissa (Théâtre Rive Gauche)
  - Grégory Gadebois – Des fleurs pour Algernon after the work by Daniel Keyes, adaptation by Gérald Sibleyras, staging by Anne Kessler (Théâtre Hébertot)
  - Jacques Weber – Gustave by Arnaud Bedouët, staging by Jacques Weber (Théâtre de l'Atelier)

Best Actress

- Elsa Zylberstein — Splendour by Géraldine Maillet, staging Catherine Schaub (Théâtre de Paris)
  - Audrey Fleurot – Un dîner d'adieu by Alexandre de La Patellière and Matthieu Delaporte, staging by Bernard Murat (Théâtre Edouard VII)
  - Béatrice Dalle – Lucrèce Borgia after the play by Victor Hugo, staging by David Bobée (Château de Grignan)
  - Isabelle Adjani – Kinship by Carey Perloff, staging by Dominique Borg (Théâtre de Paris)
  - Marie Gillain – La Vénus à la fourrure by David Ives, staging by Jérémie Lippmann (Théâtre Tristan Bernard)

==== Music ====
Best Female Performer

- Brigitte — À bouche que veux-tu (Columbia)
  - Carla Bruni – À l'Olympia (Barclay)
  - Christine and the Queens – Chaleur Humaine (Because Music)
  - Indila – Mini World (Capitol)
  - Zaz – Paris (Play On)

Best Male Performer

- Alain Souchon and Laurent Voulzy — Alain Souchon & Laurent Voulzy (Parlophone- Warner Music and Sony Music)
  - Black M – Les Yeux plus gros que le monde (Wati B)
  - Calogero – Les Feux d'artifice (Universal)
  - Johnny Hallyday – Rester Vivant (Warner Music)
  - Kendji Girac – Kendji (Mercury)

==== Literature ====
Best Novel or Essay

- Charlotte by David Foenkinos (Éditions Gallimard)
  - La Petite communiste qui ne souriait jamais by Lola Lafon (Éditions Actes Sud)
  - Le Chardonneret by Donna Tartt (Éditions Plon)
  - Le Royaume by Emmanuel Carrère (P.O.L)
  - Réparer les vivants by Maylis de Kerangal (Éditions Gallimard)

==== Arts ====
Best Exhibit

- Niki de Saint Phalle (Grand Palais)
  - Jeff Koons (Centre Pompidou)
  - Marcel Duchamp – La peinture même (Centre Pompidou)
  - Sonia Delaunay – Les couleurs de l'abstraction (Musée d'art moderne de la ville de Paris)
  - Hokusai (Grand Palais)

Best Fashion Designer

- Yiqing Yin
  - Alber Elbaz (Lanvin)
  - Sylvia Sermenghi (Legends Monaco)
  - Inès de La Fressange
  - Raf Simons (Dior)
