= Inédits 1970 =

Compilation album by Jacques Higelin
- Released: 1980
- Recorded: Studio des Abesses
- Genre: Experimental
- Length: 38:53
- Label: Saravah

Jacques Higelin chronology
La Bande du Rex (1980)	Inédits 1970 (1980)	Higelin à Mogador (1981)

Inédits 1970 (Unreleased 1970) is a compilation album by French rock singer Jacques Higelin, released in 1980. It is made from unreleased tracks from 1969 to 1971, recorded during the Jacques "Crabouif" Higelin sessions. Only the track "Nini" was released as a single back then. The instrumental parts were re-recorded in 1980 for this release, while the vocal track is the original one.

== Track listing ==
No.	Title	Writer(s)	Length
1.	"Sa dernière cigarette"	Jacques Higelin	3:36
2.	"Buster K"	Higelin	3:10
3.	"Nini"	Higelin	4:18
4.	"Seul dans notre chambre"	Higelin	4:57
5.	"L'Idiot"	Higelin	3:36
6.	"À moi les monstres"	Higelin	20:05
