= Alfred Dan Moussa =

Ivorian journalist

- Born: 1955 (age 70–71)
- Occupation: Journalist

Alfred Dan Moussa (born 1955) is an Ivorian journalist. As of August 2008, Dan Moussa is the president of the International Francophone Press Union. He came to this post in 2007, succeeding Hervé Bourges, a former president of Radio France Internationale.
