= Champagne et Caviar =

- Cover art for Champagne et Caviar and Champagne pour tout le monde,.

Studio album by Jacques Higelin
- Released: December 1979
- Recorded: Studio in the country, Bogalusa, Louisiana; Château d'Hérouville
- Genre: French rock
- Length: 39:30 (Champagne pour tout le monde); 38:48 (Caviar pour les autres)
- Label: Pathé-Marconi/EMI
- Producer: Jacques Higelin

Jacques Higelin chronology
No Man's Land (1978)	Champagne et Caviar (1979)	La Bande du Rex (1980)

Alternative cover
- Cover art for Caviar pour les autres....

Champagne et Caviar (Champagne and Caviar) is the eighth album by French rock singer Jacques Higelin, released in December 1979. It was initially released simultaneously as two separate albums titled Champagne pour tout le monde, (Champagne for everyone,) and Caviar pour les autres... (Caviar for everyone else...), but has since been released as a double album under its current title.

== Reception ==
=== Commercial performance ===
Both halves of the album were commercially successful, being certified Gold the following year, in 1980.

=== Critical reception ===
The French edition of Rolling Stone magazine named it the 35th greatest French rock album.

== Track listing ==
Champagne pour tout le monde,
No.	Title	Writer(s)	Length
1.	"Champagne"	Jacques Higelin	4:15
2.	"Cayenne c'est fini"	Higelin	4:55
3.	"Tête en l'air"	Higelin	3:37
4.	"Dans mon aéroplane blindé"	Higelin	4:43
5.	"Ah la la quelle vie qu'cette vie"	Higelin	4:03
6.	"L'Attentat à la pudeur (with Élisabeth Wiener and Serge Derrien)"	Higelin	4:00
7.	"Hold Tight (Sea Food)"	Lenny Kent, Gerry Brandon	2:02
8.	"Captain Bloody Samouraï"	Higelin, Micky Finn	3:47
9.	"Vague à l'âme"	Higelin	4:33

Caviar pour les autres...
No.	Title	Writer(s)	Length
1.	"Mama Nouvelle Orléans"	Higelin, Finn	4:40
2.	"Trois tonnes de T.N.T."	Higelin	2:37
3.	"Ci-git une star"	Higelin, Robbi Finkel	4:11
4.	"Avec la rage en d'dans"	Higelin	3:17
5.	"Je ne peux plus dire je t'aime"	Higelin	4:31
6.	"Beau, beau ou laid"	Higelin	3:35
7.	"Entre deux gares"	Higelin	2:26
8.	"Le Fil à la patte du caméléon"	Higelin, Laurent Thibault	4:31
9.	"Rappelle-moi"	Higelin	4:21
10.	"On a Rainy Sunday Afternoon"	Higelin	4:38

== Personnel ==
=== Musicians ===
- Jacques Higelin: vocals, piano, clavinets, mandocello, salt box, sanza, accordion, banjo, guitar, synthesizer, organ, keyboards.
- Bernard Paganotti: bass guitar.
- Mickey Finn: guitars.
- Freddy Wall: guitars.
- Robbi Finkel: piano, keyboards.
- Bruce Yaw: bass guitar.
- Michael Suchorsky: drums.
- Laurent Thibault: synths, water drops.
- Ken Higelin: The Little Prince.
- Dominique Bouvier: drums, percussions.
- Richard Raux: brass.
- Les Frères Guillard: brass.
- Serge Derrien: mandolin, bel canto vocals.
- Élisabeth Wiener: vocals, background vocals.
- Geneviève McLaughlin: alto.
- Anny Flamer: violin.
- Earl Tubington: saxophone.
- Birds of the Château d'Hérouville: background chirps…
- Random noises: Concorde, toad of the Château d'Hérouville and Omer the myna.

=== Production ===
- Jacques Higelin: production.
- Laurent Thibault: recording, mixing and direction.
- Christian Orsini: mastering.
- David Farell: engineering.
- Étienne Dolet: direction.
- Bernard Prim: cover picture.
- Jean-Félix Galletti: cover design and concept.
