= Christine Kelly =

French journalist, television presenter and writer (born 1969)

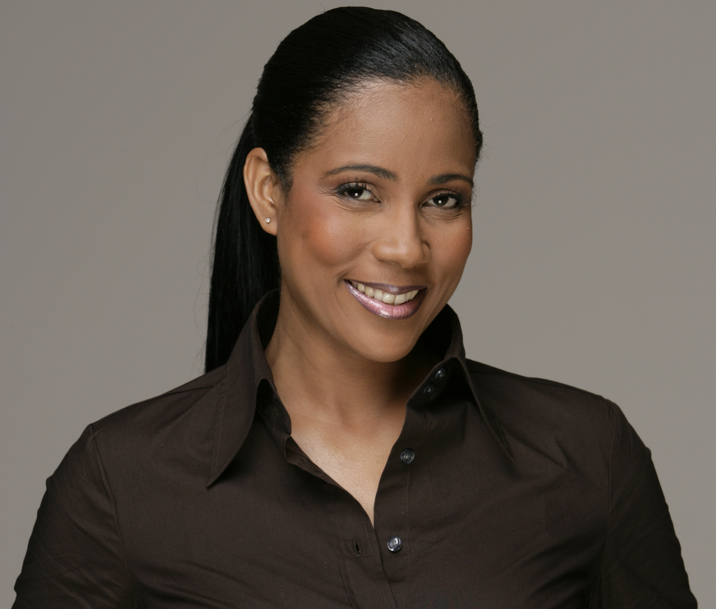
- Kelly in 2005
- Born: Christine Eugénie Tigiffon; 13 July 1969 (age 56); Lamentin, Guadeloupe
- Occupations: Journalist, television presenter, writer

Christine Eugénie Kelly (French pronunciation: [kʁistin keli]; née Tigiffon, July 13, 1969) is a French radio and television presenter, journalist, and writer.

Kelly began working in media in 1992, first in Guadeloupe, and later in metropolitan France. She was a member of the Conseil supérieur de l'audiovisuel (CSA) from 2009 to 2015. She then chaired the Alice Millat Foundation, a European foundation for women's sports.

She has hosted Face à l'info on the TV channel CNews since 2019.

== Biography ==
=== Early life ===
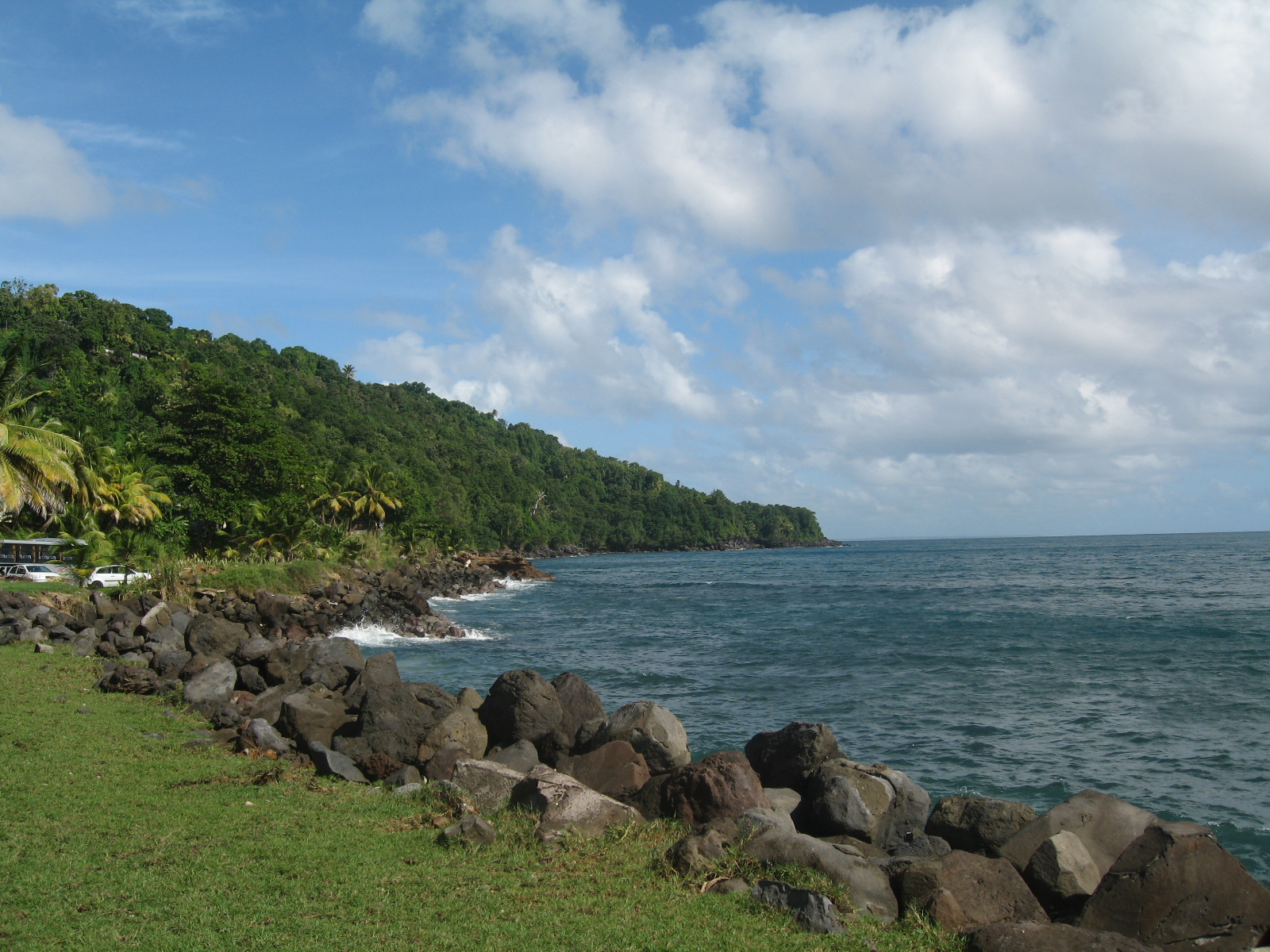
View of the coast in Lamentin.

Christine Kelly was born on 13 July 1969 in Lamentin, Guadeloupe, France. Both her parents were schoolteachers who lived in a tied cottage in a school. They then lived in a house built by her parents in Lamentin. She is the second of four children.

Her mother was violent and her father was an alcoholic. She was physically abused during her childhood. Her mother left Guadeloupe to settle in Paris. Her father joined them a year later after she stopped drinking.

After multiple suicide attempts, Kelly left home when she was 20.

=== Professional career ===
After a scientific education, Kelly considered becoming a flight attendant but decided on a career in television.

==== TV hosting in Guadeloupean media (1992–1996) ====
In 1992, Kelly joined the private channel Archipel 4, to host Caribscope, a (French-English) bilingual TV show. At the same time, she hosted a free broadcast on K’danse FM. Two years later, she became a host on RFO Guadeloupe.

==== Beginnings in France (1996–2000) ====
In 1996, at the age of 27, Kelly gave up hosting to become a journalist. She trained at the Institut national de l'audiovisuel then at the Institut de journalisme Bordeaux-Aquitaine. She then reported for different regional stations of France 3, while working for the political service of RFO, the radio station Chérie FM and the newspaper Sud Ouest. In 1997, she participated to the creation of Demain.TV, a channel that covers employment and professional training and is owned by the Canal+ Group. In 1999, she worked on La Chaîne Météo and Voyage.

==== Journalist at LCI (2000–2009) ====
In February 2000, Kelly joined the 24-hour news channel LCI, hosting its morning journal, while also hosting a monthly program on RFO and consulting for UNESCO. She was the first Black women to host a show on TV in metropolitan France. From March 2005 to July 2006, she was editor-in-chief and host of a show on sustainable development, Le Magazine, on Ushuaïa TV.

After six months conducting research for a biography of François Fillon, she returned to television in February 2008 to host the afternoon Jnews on LCI and co-host Terre-Mère, a weekly show on the environment.

In September 2008, she started hosting LCI Matin week-end on Fridays from 6 to 9 a.m. and the Saturday and Sunday news programs from 6:30 to 10:30 a.m.

==== Member of the CSA (2009–2015) ====
On January 24, 2009, without having applied, she was appointed to the Conseil supérieur de l'audiovisuel (CSA), the regulatory body for audiovisual content in France, by Gérard Larcher, the Speaker of the Senate. She was the youngest member of the CSA and the first from an overseas territory. There were recommendations from Nicolas Sarkozy to give her a governmental mission or even the ministry of the overseas, but she opted to finish her term at the CSA.

At the CSA, Kelly persuaded the television channels to include subtitles on their programs for the deaf and lower the sound level of ads after 20 years of campaigning in France, a world first. She also asked information channels to include news broadcasting in sign language, a first in France.

In 2009, a law project was discussed in the parliament to regulate food ads during children's programs. To face the risks of an interdiction, the CSA established a « food charter » in which the advertisers formulated commitments. As the chief of the mission « Santé et développement durable » (health and sustainable development) of the CSA, Kelly defended this text. The charter is considered inefficient by the UFC-Que Choisir, a consumer organization and by nutrition experts because it is non-binding and favoring, according to them, media financing of the fight against obesity. The regulation of advertising of fatty, sweet and salty foods to minors has been shown to be effective in scientific studies and implementation in other countries.

In 2012, she advocated for reducing the mandate on broadcasters to enforce an equal speaking time of presidential candidates from five to two weeks before an election.

In 2013, Kelly made it possible to cite Facebook and Twitter on television, which had been forbidden until then. She also defined the rules about product placement in fiction, which was also forbidden until then in television.

To address the lack of attention to women's sports, Kelly, who was also president of the sports mission of the CSA, created the first international day of women's sports in the media: 24 heures du sport féminin (2013). She organized a second such day on January 24, 2015.

==== After the CSA (2015–2018) ====
In 2015 she launched a project of European museum of medias called Villa Média, which was supposed to be opened to the public in 2019 in Saint-Denis, and of which she became president. In line with this project, she organizes days of debate and reflection devoted to media education, a program many celebrity personalities have participated in. In 2015, she was also elected as chief of the 2015 jury of the Globe de Cristal Awards, a reward awarded by récompenses décernées par la French press in the domains of art and culture.

Until October 2020 she was president of the Alice Milliat foundation, the only European foundation for women's sport, launched in 2016 in the presence of François Hollande, the President of France at that time. She is an ambassador of the Euro 2016, nominated by François Hollande.

In March 2018 she joined the team of Touche pas à mon poste !, on the channel C8, as a chronicler. During the summer of 2018, she presented a program in which she retraces the journey of a guest every Sunday on RTL. She also hosted a daily debate segment on CNews, where she appeared on the program Punchline alongside Laurence Ferrari. Following the 2018 media season, she joined Cyril Hanouna’s new show, Balance ton post !, on C8, as a regular columnist.

==== Presenter of Face à l'info (since 2019) ====
Since her return to TV in 2019, Kelly hosts Face à l'info on CNews, from 7 to 8 p.m. from Monday to Friday.

The program drew controversy for providing a platform to the writer and polemist Éric Zemmour. Upon its launch, several public figures announced a boycott of the channel; concurrently, Kelly received death threats.. She faced significant criticism and pressure from detractors who accused her of being too complacent toward Zemmour's views. She has since publicly distanced herself from his opinions.

Face à l’info quickly became CNews’s flagship program, achieving record ratings with nearly one million viewers in 2021. These figures propelled CNews to the top of the news channel rankings for its time slot, fueling the channel's competitive growth against BFM TV.

Since January 2021, Kelly hosts the CNews program La Belle Histoire de France (The Beautiful History of France) every Sunday with Franck Ferrand and Marc Menant.

In November 2021, Kelly filed a police complaint after receiving death threats via text message on her phone. The case was taken up by the Paris public prosecutor's office in January 2022. In October of that year, the harasser was sentenced to 18 months of suspended imprisonment and ordered to complete a 'citizenship course' (stage de citoyenneté) focused on cyberharassment. Additionally, the court imposed a five-year restraining order, prohibiting any direct or indirect contact with Kelly.

In April 2023, Kelly sponsored the online media Factuel, politically oriented to the right.

On January 17, 2024, Arcom imposed a €50,000 fine on CNews for an episode of the program Face à l'Info broadcast on September 26, 2022, and hosted by Kelly. The sanction was due to a violation of the obligation to ensure honesty and rigor in the presentation and processing of information. At issue was Kelly saying that France ranked behind Mexico in terms of insecurity, citing an unreliable source, with the approval of her guests on set.

This kind of fine is the second time CNews was sanctioned for this reason. The first time was in 2022 when they were fined for €1.

=== Associative commitments ===
Kelly is a member of the Reporters d'Espoirs agency's steering committee since 2006.

In April, 2010 Kelly founded the la Foundation K d’urgences – under the aegis of the Fondation de France – a foundation dedicated to helping single-parent families. Kelly suffered from child abuse and her father was absent during part of her childhood. The foundation has established a free "speed-dating" system connecting bailiffs (Huissier de justice) with single-parent families to assist them in recovering unpaid alimony. It is supported by, among others, Charles Aznavour, Claire Chazal and Michel Drucker. The foundation also organizes an annual "Journée K" (K Day), which attracts nearly 3,000 families and is the largest gathering for single-parent families in France. In 2017, the fifth annual Journée K was sponsored by Valérie Pécresse, president of the région Île-de-France region.

At the beginning of 2013, Kelly presented ten proposals to support single-parent families to President François Hollande. In June 2014, she launched the Single-Parent Families Charter, which was signed by 22 companies committed to promoting employment opportunities for single-parent families.

In 2015, she was appointed as an administrator of the Engie Foundation by Gérard Mestrallet. The foundation supports projects aimed at benefiting young people and promoting employment.

== Summary of professional activities ==
=== Publications ===
- L'Affaire Flactif: enquête sur la tuerie du Grand-Bornand. Paris: éditions Calmann-Lévy. 11 May 2006. ISBN 2-7021-3655-9.
- François Fillon: le secret et l'ambition. Paris: éditions du Moment. 15 November 2007. ISBN 978-2-35417-020-2.
- La Parole est à la défense. Paris: éditions du Moment. Cowriter: William Gallas. 21 November 2008. ISBN 978-2-35417-035-6.
- Le Scandale du silence: familles monoparentales. Paris: éditions Léo Scheer. 14 March 2012. ISBN 978-2-7561-0368-6.
- Invitée surprise. Paris: éditions du Moment. 18 November 2015. ISBN 978-2-35417-455-2.
- François Fillon: les coulisses d'une ascension. L'Archipel. 11 January 2017. ISBN 2809822026.
- Libertés sans expression. Cherche Midi. 9 June 2022. ISBN 978-2-7491-7219-4.

=== Media journey ===
- 1992–1996: Caribscope sur Archipel 4
- 1997: presenter on Demain TV
- 1999: presenter on La Chaîne Météo
- 1999: presenter on Voyage
- 2000: presenter on RFO
- 2000–2007: Morning journals on LCI
- 2005–2006: Le Magazine on Ushuaïa TV
- 2008–2009: LCI Matin week-end sur LCI
- 2008–2009: Journals of the Saturdays and Sundays from 6:30 to 10:30 am on LCI
- 2018–2019: Touche pas à mon poste ! on C8
- 2018–2019: Débat sur CNews
- 2018–2020: Balance ton post ! sur C8
- 2019: Présumé innocent sur C8
- Since 2019: Face à l'info on CNews
- Since 2021: La Belle Histoire de France sur CNews
- 2023: Mourir n'est pas tuer: le débat on C8

== Distinctions ==
- 2010: Chevalier de l'Ordre national du Mérite.
- 2021: Officier de l'Ordre national du Mérite.
