= 4th Globes de Cristal Awards =

- Date: 2 February 2009
- Site: Le Lido, Paris, France
- Hosted by: Jean-Luc Delarue; Carole Gaessler

Television coverage
- Network: France 3

The 4th Globes de Cristal Award ceremony honoured the best French movies, actors, actresses, plays, concerts, novels, singers, TV series, exhibitions and fashion designers of 2008 and took place on 2 February 2009 at Le Lido in Paris. The ceremony was chaired by Jacques Attali.

== Winners and nominees ==
The winners are denoted in bold.

=== Cinema ===
Best Film
- **Mesrine** – **Jean-François Richet**
- The Class – Laurent Cantet
- Love Me No More – Jean Becker
- A Christmas Tale – Arnaud Desplechin
- The First Day of the Rest of Your Life – Rémi Bezançon
Best Actor
- **Vincent Cassel** – **Mesrine**
- Albert Dupontel – Love Me No More
- Mathieu Amalric – Mesrine
- Roschdy Zem – The Girl from Monaco
- Kad Merad – Bienvenue chez les Ch'tis
Best Actress
- **Sylvie Testud** – **Sagan**
- Catherine Deneuve – A Christmas Tale
- Nathalie Baye – A French Gigolo
- Catherine Frot – Mark of an Angel
- Yolande Moreau – Séraphine

=== Television ===
Best TV Series / TV Movie
- **Sagan** – **Diane Kurys**
- Résolution 819 – Giacomo Battiato
- Plus belle la vie – Hubert Besson
- Mafiosa – Hugues Pagan
- Hard – Cathy Verney
Best Documentary
- **9/3 Mémoire d'un territoire** – **Yamina Benguigui**

=== Theater ===
Best Play
- **The Life Before Us** – **Didier Long**
Best Musical
- **Le soldat rose** – **Louis Chedid & Dominique Burgaug**
Best One Man Show
- **Valérie Lemercier** – **Valérie Lemercier au Palace**
Best Opera – Dance
- **Blanche Neige** – **Angelin Preljocaj**

=== Literature ===
Best Novel or Essay
- **Où on va, papa ?** – **Jean-Louis Fournier**
Best Comic Book
- **Une vie de chat** – **Philippe Geluck**

=== Music ===
Best Female Singer
- **Anaïs Croze** – **The Love Album**
Best Male Singer
- **Julien Doré** – **Ersatz**

=== Others ===
Best Exhibition
- **Picasso et les Maîtres au Grand Palais**
Best Architect or Designer
- **Andrée Putman**
Best Fashion Designer
- **Isabel Marant**

=== Special ===
Honorary Globe
- **Roberto Alagna**

== See also ==
- 34th César Awards
