= Saint-Basile, Ardèche =

Saint-Basile
- Commune
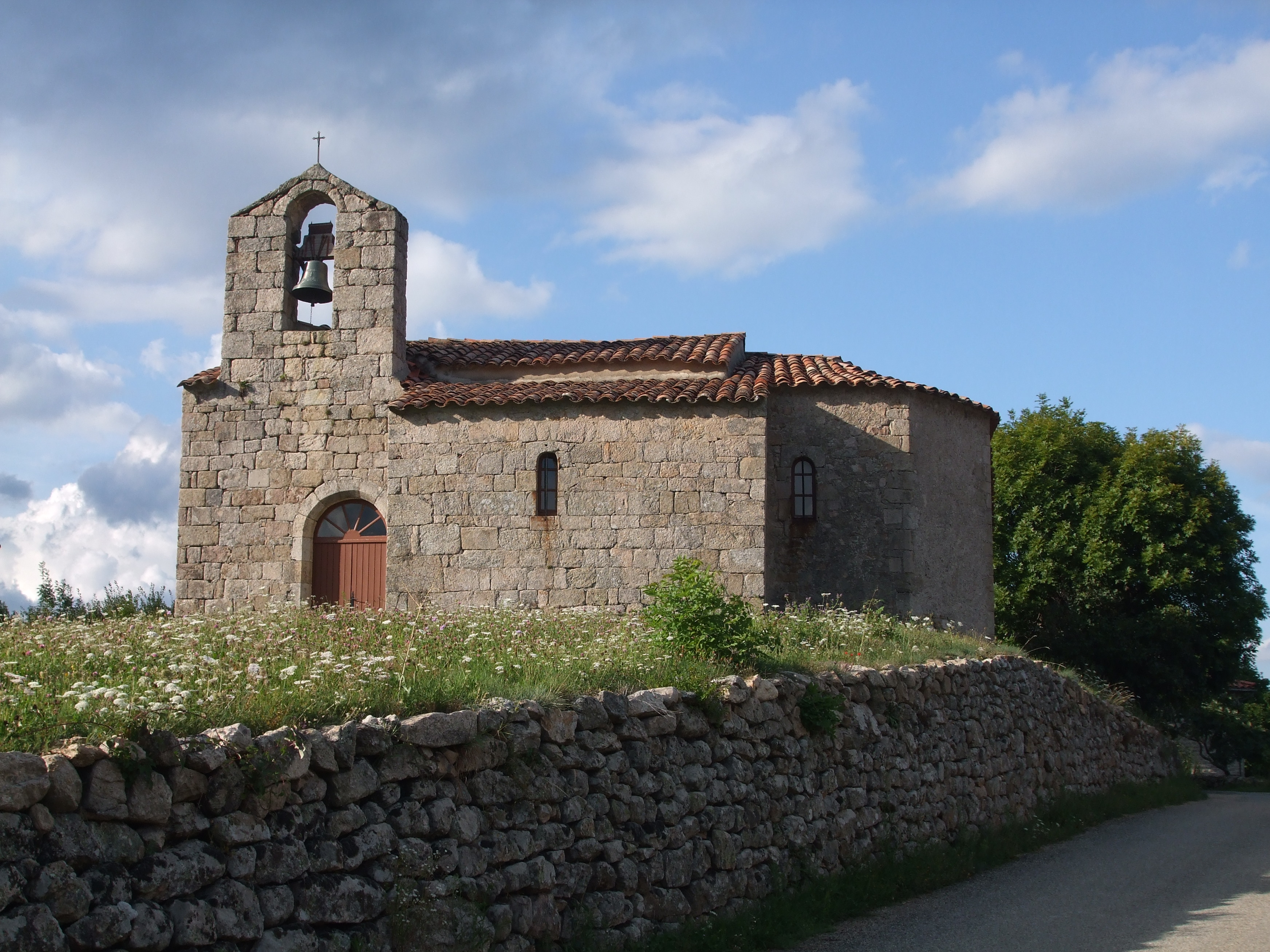
- The church of Mounens, in the commune of Saint-Basile
- Location of Saint-Basile
- Location within France Location within Auvergne-Rhône-Alpes
- Coordinates: 44°57′25″N 4°34′19″E
- Country: France
- Region: Auvergne-Rhône-Alpes
- Department: Ardèche
- Arrondissement: Tournon-sur-Rhône
- Canton: Haut-Vivarais

Government
  - Mayor (2021–2026): Michel Landrein
- Area^{1}: 17.85 km^{2} (6.89 sq mi)
- Highest elevation: 878 m (2,881 ft)
- Lowest elevation: 413 m (1,355 ft)
- Population (2023): 356
  - Density: 19.9/km^{2} (51.7/sq mi)
- Time zone: UTC+01:00 (CET)
  - Summer (DST): UTC+02:00 (CEST)
- INSEE/Postal code: 07218 /07270
- ^{1} French Land Register data, which excludes lakes, ponds, glaciers > 1 km^{2} (0.386 sq mi or 247 acres) and river estuaries.

Saint-Basile (French pronunciation: [sɛ̃ bazil]; Occitan: Sant Basile) is a commune in the Ardèche department in southern France. The commune consists of four hamlets: Saint-Basile, Mounens, Laprans, and Cluac. A castle in the commune is owned by French comedian Yves Lecoq.

== Population ==
Historical population
Year	Pop.	±% p.a.
1968	416	—
1975	367	−1.77%
1982	314	−2.20%
1990	273	−1.73%
1999	279	+0.24%
2007	318	+1.65%
2012	323	+0.31%
2017	353	+1.79%
2023	356	+0.14%
Source: INSEE

Inhabitants of Saint-Basile are called Basiliens in French.

== See also ==
- Communes of the Ardèche department
