= BBH 75 =

Studio album by Jacques Higelin
- Released: December 1974
- Recorded: Studio Pathé-Marconi, Paris
- Genre: French rock
- Length: 34:44
- Label: EMI, Pathé Marconi
- Producer: Jacques Higelin

Jacques Higelin chronology
Jacques "Crabouif" Higelin (1971)	BBH 75 (1974)	Irradié (1976)

BBH 75 is the fourth album by French rock singer Jacques Higelin, released in 1974 on the Pathé Marconi label. It is a radical departure from his previous works with the Saravah label, as it is entirely a rock album. The album would bring Higelin commercial success and critical recognition from French rock circles, and the album is considered influential on the future of French rock.

== History ==
The title of the album is the initials of the three musicians from the album: Charles Bennaroch, Simon Boissezon and Jacques Higelin. The album was initially titled BBH 74, but as it was released near the end of 1974, it was finally retitled BBH 75. A rare promotional vinyl released back then bore the original title.

== Critical reception ==
The French edition of Rolling Stone magazine named it the 5th greatest French rock album. It's also included in the book Philippe Manœuvre présente : Rock français, de Johnny à BB Brunes, 123 albums essentiels. It is certified gold for 100,000 copies sold.

== Track listing ==
Side A
No.	Title	Length
1.	"Paris-New York, N.Y.-Paris"	4:20
2.	"Cigarette"	4:29
3.	"Mona Lisa Klaxon"	3:15
4.	"Chaud, chaud, bizness show"	4:15

Side B
No.	Title	Length
5.	"Est-ce que ma guitare est un fusil ?"	5:40
6.	"Une mouche sur ma bouche"	4:20
7.	"Œsophage boogie, cardiac' blues"	4:24
8.	"Boxon"	3:30

== Personnel ==
=== Musicians ===
- Charles Bennaroch - drums, percussion, harmonica.
- Simon Boissezon - bass guitar, guitars.
- Jacques Higelin - vocals.

=== Production ===
- Jacques Higelin - producer.
- Roger Ducourtieux - recording.
- Claude Dejacques - artistic direction.
- Patrice Duchemin, Yves Van Waerbeke - photographs.
- Norman Mongan - design.

== Certifications ==
Region	Certification	Certified units/sales
France (SNEP)	Gold	100,000^{*}
^{*} Sales figures based on certification alone.
