= Charles Dantzig =

French author

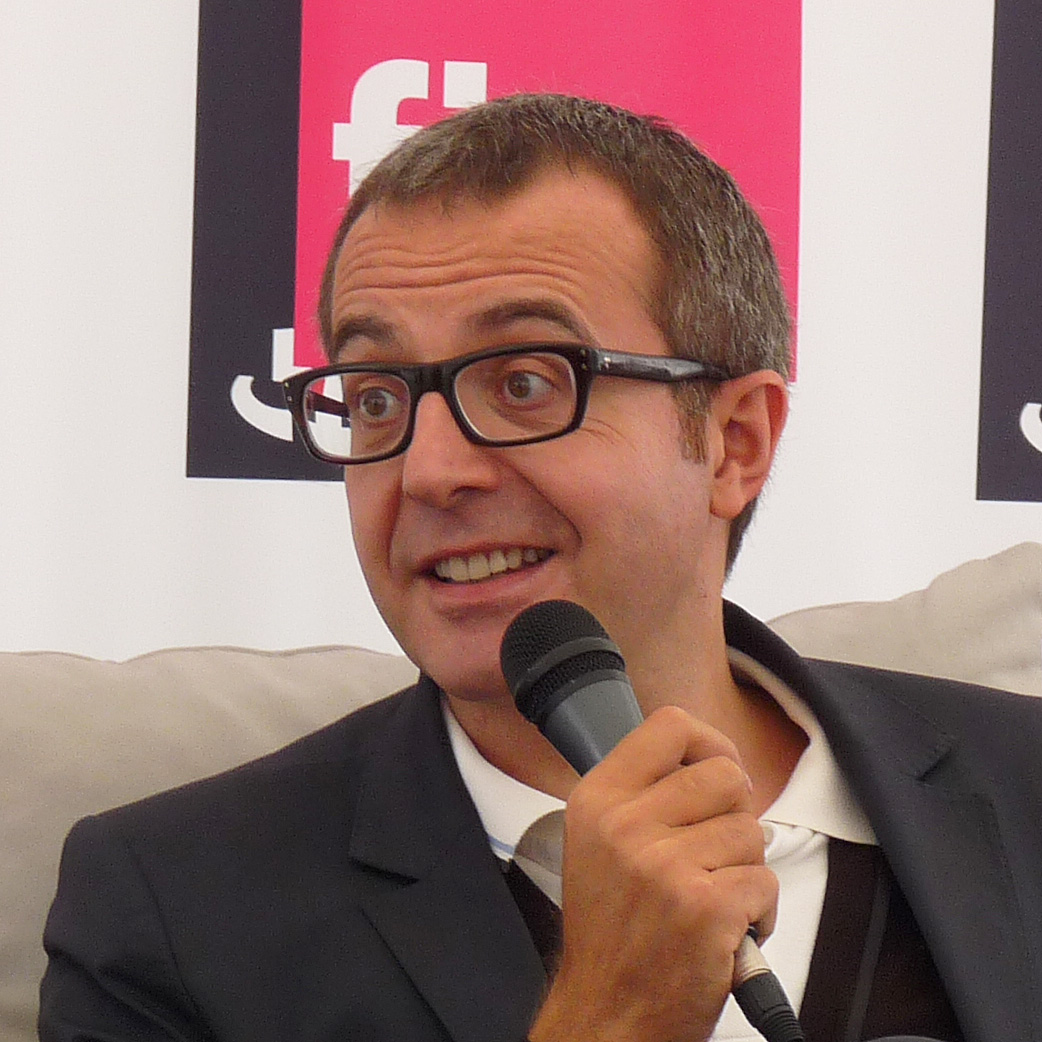
Charles Dantzig, 2011

Charles Dantzig is a French author, born in Tarbes (France) on October 7, 1961.

== Early life and career ==
Charles Dantzig decided to study Law after his baccalauréat. Having completed a doctorate in Law from the university of Toulouse, he moved to Paris.

A few years later, at the age of twenty-eight, he published an essay on Remy de Gourmont entitled Remy de Gourmont, Cher Vieux Daim ! (Le Rocher, 1990), soon followed by his first collection of poems, Le chauffeur est toujours seul'', to critical acclaim.

== Author and publisher ==
Charles Dantzig joined the publishing company Les Belles Lettres, launching three new collections: "Brique", specialising in contemporary literature, "Eux & nous", in which French writers discuss the authors of classical Antiquity, and "Trésors de la nouvelle", which, as its name suggests, specialises in short stories. He published the first French translation of a collection of poetry by F. Scott Fitzgerald, Thousand-and-First Ship (Mille et un navires), and himself translated the play The Vegetable (Un legume). He also translated the first French edition of a collection of Oscar Wilde's journalism, Aristotle at an Afternoon Tea (Aristote à l'heure du thé). Charles Dantzig also oversaw the publication of Marcel Schwob's complete works (Œuvres, Les Belles Lettres).

Les Belles Lettres published his early essays, including Il n'y a pas d'Indochine (1995) and La Guerre du cliché (1998), and his poetry collections Que le siècle commence (1996, awarded the prix Paul Verlaine), Ce qui se passe vraiment dans les toiles de Jouy (1999), and À quoi servent les avions ? (2001), which foreshadowed the events of 9/11. He later wrote, "A few people have said to me that the mysterious power of poetry is such that it foresees events. I'm not so sure. [...] Poetry reasons rather than foresees. The result – as in all literature, and even in all works of art – is thought. Except that rather than obtaining it by sparking speculations, it does so by sparking images, within the demands of rhythm, and in some cases, prosody" (J'ai interrompu très tôt une carrière de poète). The first selection of his poems was published in 2003 with the title En souvenir des long-courriers. 2003 also saw the publication of the Bestiaire, a collection of animal poetry.

He then moved to Grasset, where he oversees the "Cahiers Rouges" series, breathing fresh life into the list by publishing cult classics as well as major twentieth-century diarists and authors of memoirs, or publishing brand-new anthologies (Le Cahier Rouge des plus belles lettres de langue française, 2017). As an editor at Grasset's, he published many award-winning literary authors.

Between 2006 and 2008, Charles Dantzig penned the epilogue for the special reports in the monthly Magazine Littéraire, offering his iconoclastic literary views on various topics, from the French-speaking world to authors and psychoanalysis. From 2011, it has been followed by the literary chronicle in the Magazine Littéraire. He iss also a producer on the cultural public radio France Culture, where he created "Secret professionnel" on the artistic creation, now followed by "Personnages en personne", a weekly portrait of a fictional character.

In 2011 he re-created the famous Stendhal Club, which he presides. It has only 12 members in the world (American member: Daniel Mendelsohn; English member: Patrick McGuinness, Oxford). The Stendhal Club has published two issues of his "possibly annual review".

In 2015, he landed a new literary collection under the name, "Le Courage". It is the only multilingual review in the world, presenting every text in its original language and with its French translation. In 2017, the review has received the Paris Rive gauche award of the Best literary review

He was awarded the Grand Prix Jean Giono for his body of work and the grand prix de littérature Paul-Morand.

== Novels ==
Charles Dantzig's first novel, Confitures de crimes (the title refers to a line from a poem by H.J.-M. Levet: "Le soleil se couche en des confitures de crimes"), was published by Les Belles Lettres in 1993. It recounted the life of a poet elected president of France, who went on to start a war. This work of fiction was the first indication of Charles Dantzig's passion for literature and his ironic handling of posturing and comedy. His second novel, Nos vies hâtives (Grasset, 2001), was awarded the Prix Jean-Freustié and the Roger Nimier Prize. The third, Un film d'amour, was published in 2003. It was a choral novel with a scholarly structure that supposedly drew on a TV documentary on the death of a young film-maker by the name of Birbillaz. "At first, the reader takes this book – intelligent from the first line to the last – for a formalist whimsy, before grasping that it aims for a kind of totality, like all great books. It leaves behind its ostensible subject, the portrait of the absent figure, Birbillaz, to focus on his brother – his double, his mirror image – like something out of Robert Louis Stevenson: a failure in life, bitter, rotten to the core, who says no to everything, to the point of obstinacy and pain. No to love, to talent, to creativity, to goodness, to beauty. A "no!" that he shouts in people's faces, to the very gates of Hell – and no doubt beyond." (Jacques Drillon, Le Nouvel Observateur, October 16, 2003). Grasset published Charles Dantzig's fourth novel, Je m'appelle François, in 2007. It was inspired by the real-life crimes of Christophe Rocancourt, which the author transformed and transfigured into a new fictional destiny. In August 2011 appears "Dans un avion pour Caracas", a novel entirely happening in a plane flight between Paris and Caracas.

In 2015, Grasset published Charles Dantzig's fifth novel, Histoire de l'amour et de la haine, which tells about the turmoil that occurred in France in 2013 on the occasion of the voting of the law for same-sex marriage. The plot is developed in a very innovative way. Each chapter is a theme or an image that is addressed by the polyphony of the thoughts and experience of the seven characters in a surprising choral structure.

In 2024, Charles Dantzig published a new novel, Paris dans tous ses siècles (Grasset), for which he was awarded the Prix Balzac.

== Essays ==
2005 saw the publication of Charles Dantzig's Dictionnaire égoïste de la littérature française, which was awarded a number of prizes, including the Prix Décembre, The Prix de l'Essai de l'Académie française and the Grand prix des lectrices de Elle. The Dictionnaire gave him free rein to develop his aesthetic vision of literature, illustrated with numerous comments on style. The work enjoyed considerable critical and popular esteem, not only in France but also abroad, and was hailed as the major literary event of the year.

"A bestseller in the francophone world, Dantzig's Dictionnaire égoïste de la littérature française is en extraordinary undertaking, and anyone who buys it is expecting a fact-filled reference book will be either disappointed or, more likely, happily surprised. Biased, mischievous, provocative, Dantzig is also massively well read, funny and instructive. He is an elegant writer, and is clearly passionate about books." Patrick McGuinness, Times Literary Supplement, jul, 14. 2006

In January 2009, Grasset published a new major work by Charles Dantzig. The Encyclopédie capricieuse du tout et du rien, written as a compilation of lists, enjoyed considerable success. It met with wide critical acclaim and made the front cover of Le Monde in a cartoon by Plantu. It won the Prix Duménil in May 2009 following a unanimous vote.

Charles Dantzig published his essay on reading, Pourquoi Lire ?, in October 2010. It again met with immediate critical acclaim and popular success and was awarded the Grand Prix Giono. "Divided into over seventy short chapters, the book is an impassioned, wide-ranging and occasionally humorous meditation, buttressed by well-chosen quotations, on reading in all its aspects from "Learning to read", in which he says that he has never understood the pejorative tag attached to the word "bookish", through "Reading aloud" to "How to read".", Adrian Tahourdin,

In 2012, he published a page in the French newspaper Le Monde (march, 17) called "Du populisme en littérature" (On populism in literature) where he expresses his concern on a dangerous trend in modern literature. Wouldn't more and more "realist" writers be in fact serving some obscure reactionary forces? It has raised a huge controversy all over the world (Canada, Italy - translation in the Corriere della sera)...

In January 2013, he publishes a new essay on masterpieces in literature, the first one in French language, "A propos des chefs-d'oeuvre." The book is already translated in many foreign countries, Italy, Germany, China.

Faithful to his fondness for anglophone literature, Charles Dantzig publishes in May 2013 a new French translation of Oscar Wilde's The Importance of Being Earnest, with a long foreword, "La première Gay Pride" ("The First Gay Pride"). He stresses the too often forgotten gay subtext of Wilde's play. This foreword echoes a tribune he published in Le Monde, "Non à la collusion de la haine" (nov., 17, 2012), against the wave of homophobic hatred in France during the gay wedding quarrel. This tribune was signed by dozens of French writers, intellectuals and artists, gay and not gay.

In 2016, he published at Laffont, in the famous collection "Bouquins" (a Robert Laffont collection devoted for many years to publish collected works of major authors, from Victor Hugo to Marcel Proust), a book entitled Les Ecrivains et leurs mondes which includes the Dictionnaire égoïste de la littérature, the Guerre du cliché, and a new essay called Ma République idéale. He became the youngest author published in this collection.

In 2017, he published at Grasset Traité des gestes, a thorough study of all the well-known and less-known gestures done by the human being. Based on personal memories, historical or artistic examples, this various and startling essay raises the questions of the permanence of gestures and their true meaning, whether it can be found. The literary magazine Transfuge has dedicated to him his cover for the third time, which makes him the only author having been given this distinction.

In 2019, Charles Dantzig published his Dictionnaire égoïste de la littérature mondiale (Grasset). Following his Dictionnaire égoïste de la littérature française, this second volume focuses on "world" literature rather than "foreign" literature; in an entry titled "Foreigner," the author explains that he does not believe the concept of "foreignness" exists in literature. He also published Chambord-des-songes, in which, blending the history of the château with elements of imagination, he reflects on the concept of History and how songes (creative visions)—as opposed to rêves (sterile dreams)—guide the world.

In 2021, he released the essay Théories de théories at Grasset, playing on the double meaning of the word "theory": both a "general proposition on a particular subject" and a "procession" (or succession of things). He also published a brief essay, Le Napoléonisme. Les trois stades du légendaire. Using Napoleon as a case study, he examines how a political legend takes shape: evolving from a mere propaganda tool, it transforms after the subject's death into a nostalgic system of adoration serving a party, before finally becoming a meaningless symbol and a form of decorative art.

In 2022, he published a new translation of Robert Ross’s biographical essay on the illustrator Aubrey Beardsley (Les Cahiers rouges, Grasset), as well as Proust Océan, an essay on Marcel Proust and In Search of Lost Time. In 2024, he released a new anthology, Histoire littéraire des Français, in the "Bouquins" collection, which thematically gathers literary writings chronicling the lifestyles of the French people. In 2025, for his collection "Le Courage" (Grasset), he edited and prefaced Masculinité?, an anthology of testimonies from nine men under thirty-five—from diverse countries, social backgrounds, and sexualities—regarding their experience of masculinity.

In 2026, Grasset published Inventaire de la basse période, an essay addressing "the looming tyranny" in the Western world and the individual and collective attitudes that risk allowing it to overwhelm democracies.

== Poetry ==
In January 2010, Charles Dantzig published two books of poetry simultaneously: a collection of his own new poems in Grasset's Collection Bleue, Les nageurs, and an anthology of his poetry with new writing and critical essays, La Diva aux longs cils. The poems were selected by Patrick McGuinness of St Anne's College, Oxford. At the same time, Charles Dantzig's novel Je m'appelle François was published in paperback and his translations of Oscar Wilde and F. Scott Fitzgerald were republished in the Cahiers Rouges collection. Les nageurs and La Diva aux longs cils were presented at the Maison Française in Oxford in 2010.

In 2018, he published a new volume of poetry, Démocratie de bord de mer (Grasset).

== Art ==
Charles Dantzig's cultural interests are not limited to books. He is also a connoisseur of art, regularly contributing to arts and aesthetics reviews, working alongside artists such as Philippe Cognée and Antonio Segui. He inaugurated the Petit pan de mur jaune series at the Musée du Louvre in 2007, giving a presentation in front of Van Dyck's painting Les princes Charles-Louis et Rupert du Palatinat. He was an associate curator of the inaugural exhibition of the new Centre Pompidou museum in Metz, Chefs-d'œuvre?, where the Charles Dantzig Room explored the notion of the masterpiece in literature.

Charles Dantzig contributes to musée d'Orsay's 2013-2014 "Masculin Masculin" exhibition on male nude with an essay on male nude in literature, "Le Grand Absent". He also wrote the foreword of Oscar Wilde - l'impertinent absolu, an exhibition about Oscar Wilde at the Petit Palais, in Paris.

In 2025, Charles Dantzig created the ‘Un seul art’ collection for Grasset, co-published with the Centre Pompidou. During the five years that the Centre is closed for works, ten works from the museum's collections will be the subject of texts written by various writers. In April 2025, the collection opens with Grand intérieur rouge by Dany Laferrière, a tribute to the work of the French artist Henri Matisse, and Jimmy Freeman by Joy Majdalani, an essay on the famous Robert Mapplethorpe photograph.

== Radio ==
From 2011 to 2017, he's been producer of the weekly radioshow "Secret Professionel" (Professional Secret) on France Culture. On this programme dedicated to writers but also to conversation, he welcomed all kind of artists, writers and specialists in order to reveal the mysterious ways to creation and art. Each episode was dedicated to an art, a place or an institution (Chambord Castle, collections, museums, schools,...). The programme has been ranked by the magazine Télérama among the 10 best radio programmes of the year 2017.

Since 2017, he produces every Sunday on France Culture the radioshow "Personnages en personne" (Characters in person). He presents every week a famous fictional character, whether it is drawn from a novel, a film, a song, a video game or street art (Catherine Holly from Suddenly, last summer, Ziggy Stardust from The Rise and fall of Ziggy Stardust and the spiders from Mars.

== Collection ==
In April 2015, Charles Dantzig has created and supervises the annual review and collection Le Courage, published at Grasset. This magazine which has known three editions is more an essay by several authors than a true magazine, because of the unique theme of each edition. In Le Monde of 10 April 2015, he explains the nature and aims of the magazine: "In a certain way, this project follows my opinion piece published in Le Monde in April 2012, about and against populism in literature. The Courage is a magazine that thinks about and will keep thinking about forms; because literature must show it consists in proposing forms, and in asserting that forms are a way of resisting." After "La Littérature" in 2015 and "Les Salauds" in 2016, the third number deals with the "Age d'or/Age de fer". The magazine has been awarded in 2017 by the Prix de la Rive Gauche à Paris of the best review.

== Works ==
Essays

- Inventaire de la Basse Période (Grasset, 2026)
- Histoire littéraire des Français (Bouquins, 2024)
- Proust Océan (Grasset, 2022)
- Théories de théories (Grasset, 2021)
- Dictionnaire égoïste de la littérature mondiale (Grasset, 2019)
- Traité des gestes (Grasset, 2017)
- Les écrivains et leurs mondes (Laffont, Bouquins, 2016)
- À propos des chefs-d'œuvre (Grasset, 2013)
- Pourquoi lire ? (Grasset, 2010)
- Encyclopédie capricieuse du tout et du rien (Grasset, 2009–prix Duménil)
- Dictionnaire égoïste de la littérature française (Grasset, 2005, et Le Livre de Poche–prix Décembre, prix de l'Essai de l'Académie française, grand prix des lectrices de Elle, Globes de Cristal Award for Best Novel or Essay)
- La Guerre du cliché (Les Belles Lettres, 1998)
- Il n'y a pas d'Indochine (Les Belles Lettres, 1995)
- Le Style cinquième (Les Belles Lettres, 1992)
- Remy de Gourmont, Cher Vieux Daim ! (Le Rocher, 1990; 2e édition : Grasset, 2008)

Poetry

- Genre : Fluide (Points Poésie, éditions du Seuil, 2022)
- Démocratie de bord de mer, (Grasset, 2018)
- Les Nageurs, (Grasset, 2010)
- La Diva aux longs cils, (Grasset, 2010)
- Bestiaire, avec des encres de Mino (Les Belles Lettres, 2003)
- En souvenir des long-courriers (Les Belles Lettres, 2003)
- À quoi servant les avions ? (Les Belles Lettres, 2001)
- Ce qui se passe vraiment dans les toiles de Jouy (Les Belles Lettres, 1999)
- Que le siècle commence (Les Belles Lettres, 1996–prix Paul Verlaine)
- Le chauffeur est toujours seul (La Différence, 1995)

Novels

- Paris dans tous ses siècles (Grasset, 2024)
- Histoire de l'amour et de la haine (Grasset, 2015)
- Dans un avions pour Caracas (Grasset, 2011, et Le Livre de Poche)
- Je m'appelle François (Grasset, 2007, et Le Livre de Poche)
- Un film d'amour (Grasset, 2003, et Le Livre de Poche)
- Nos vies hâtives (Grasset, 2001, et Le Livre de Poche–prix Jean Freustié, Roger Nimier Prize)
- Confitures de crimes (Les Belles Lettres, 1993)

Theatre

- ROTOTO Ier (Grasset, 2025)
