= Jacques Higelin =

French pop singer (1940–2018)

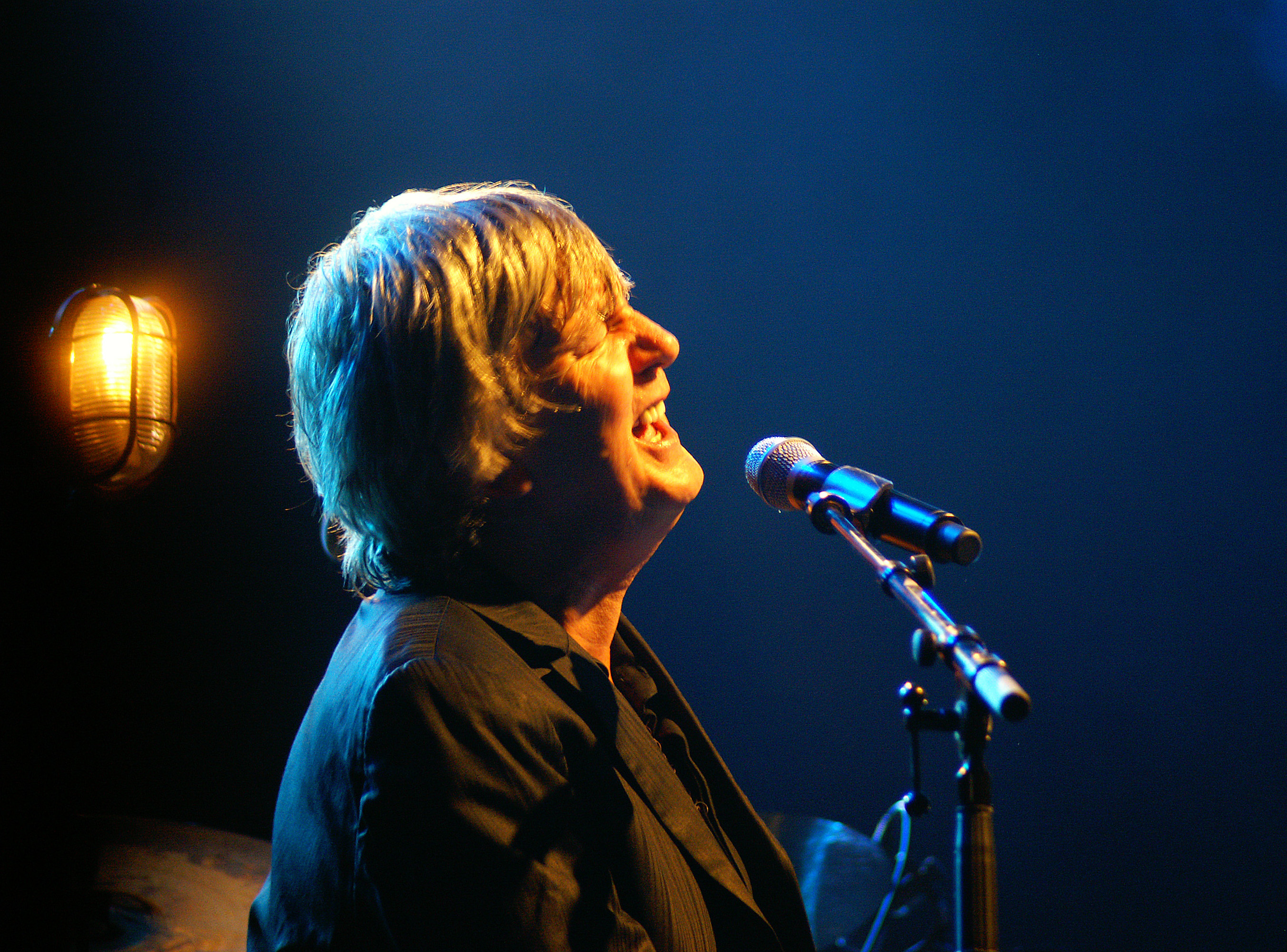
- Higelin in 2007

Background information
- Born: Jacques Joseph Victor Higelin; 18 October 1940; Brou-sur-Chantereine, Île-de-France, France
- Died: 6 April 2018 (aged 77) Nogent-sur-Marne, France
- Genres: French pop Chanson
- Occupation: Singer-songwriter
- Instruments: Guitar, piano, banjo, accordion, harmonica, melodica, harpsichord
- Years active: 1969–2018
- Website: www.jacqueshigelin.fr

Jacques Joseph Victor Higelin (French pronunciation: [ʒak ʒozɛf viktɔʁ iʒlɛ̃]; 18 October 1940 – 6 April 2018) was a French pop singer who rose to prominence in the early 1970s.

== Early life ==
Higelin was born on 18 October 1940. His father, Paul, a railway worker and musician of Alsatian descent, introduced his two sons to various forms of music. Their mother, Renée, was of Belgian descent, and raised both the boys.

== Career ==
Higelin's entertainment career began at age 14, when he left school to work as a stunt double. While playing several minor roles in motion pictures, Higelin was taught to play the guitar by Henri Crolla, a French-Italian jazz guitarist and a composer of film scores. By the early 1960s, Higelin was attending the René Simon drama school, where he won the François Périer award.

After his mandatory two-year military service, he resumed his film career around 1963 but began to focus more on music. By the end of the decade, he had become very active in the artistic underground in Paris and began to channel his music towards radical activism.

Higelin began attracting popular attention through his live concerts, typically held in smaller venues, and released his first solo album in 1971. By the middle of the 1970s, Higelin had become one of France's most successful pop musicians, and he remains influential to this day.

In the 1970s, Higelin was in a relationship with a Vietnamese woman named Kuelan Nguyen. They had a son together.

In 1976, Nguyen accompanied Higelin during the recording of an album at the Château d'Hérouville, where Iggy Pop was also recording his debut solo album The Idiot. Pop became infatuated with Nguyen and had an affair with her. The two did not speak the same language, communicating through gestures and expressions. The incident inspired his song "China Girl", which he wrote with David Bowie. Although not successful when Pop released it, the song later became a hit when re-recorded by Bowie in 1983 for his album Let's Dance, charting in the UK and the United States.

== Personal life and death ==
Higelin had three children, each by a different woman. They all became artists:

- Arthur H, singer, born to Nicole Courtois in 1966
- Kên Higelin, actor, born to Kuelan Nguyen in 1972
- daughter Izïa, singer, born to dancer Aziza Zakine in 1990. Higelin married Zakine in 2011.

Higelin died on 6 April 2018 in Paris at the age of 77.

== Discography ==
=== Albums ===
Studio albums (non-charting)

- 1971 – Jacques "Crabouif" Higelin
- 1976 – Irradié
- 1976 – Alertez les bébés !
- 1978 – No Man's Land
- 1979 – Champagne pour tout le monde, and Caviar pour les autres... (also released as a double album under the title Champagne et Caviar, currently the standard edition)
- 1980 – La Bande du Rex
- 1982 – Higelin 82
- 1985 – Aï (double album)
- 1988 – Tombé du ciel
- 1991 – Illicite
- 1994 – Aux héros de la voltige
- 1998 – Paradis paien
- 2005 – Jacque Higelin chante Vian et Higelin
- 2006 – Amor Doloroso
- 2010 – Coup de foudre
- 2013 – Beau Repaire

Studio albums (charting)

Year	Album	Credited to	Peak positions		
Year	Album	Credited to	FRA	BEL (Wa)	SWI
1974	BBH 75	Benarroch, Boissezon, Higelin (BBH)	117	–	–
1998	Paradis païen	Higelin	7	–	–
2006	Amor doloroso	Jacques Higelin	7	83	97
2010	Coup de foudre	Higelin	2	20	51
2013	Beau repaire	Higelin	5	49	–
2016	Higelin 75	Higelin	6	36	74

Live albums (non-charting)

- 1981: Higelin à Mogador (triple album, 2 CDs)
- 1983: Casino de Paris (1 album, 1 CD)
- 1986: Higelin à Bercy (triple album, 2 CD)
- 1990: Follow the Live (double album, 1 CD)
- 1992: Higelin Le Rex (double album, 1 CD)

Live albums (charting)

Year	Album	Credited to	Peak positions		
Year	Album	Credited to	FRA	BEL (Wa)	SWI
2000	Higelin Live 2000	Jacques Higelin	60	–	–
2005	Higelin enchante Trenet	Jacques Higelin	36	83	–
2007	En plein Bataclan	Jacques Higelin	151	–	–
2010	Paris/Zénith 18 October 2010	Higelin	200	–	–

Albums with Brigitte Fontaine

- 1966: 12 chansons d'avant le déluge
- 1976: 15 chansons d'avant le déluge, suite et fin

Album with Areski Belkacem

- 1969: Higelin et Areski

Compilations

- 1973 – Jacques Canetti présente Jacques Higelin
- 1980 – Inédits 1970
- 2005 – Entre deux gares

== Filmography ==
- 2004 : Colette, une femme libre, directed by Nadine Trintignant (TV Mini-Series)
