= Irradié =

Studio album by Jacques Higelin
- Released: January 1976
- Genre: French rock
- Length: 43:15
- Producer: Jacques Higelin

Jacques Higelin chronology
BBH 75 (1974)	Irradié (1976)	Alertez les bébés ! (1976)

Irradié is the fifth album by French rock singer Jacques Higelin, released in 1976.

== Track listing ==
Side A
No.	Title	Length
1.	"Rock in chair"	5:17
2.	"O fais-moi l'amour"	5:34
3.	"Mon portrait dans la glace"	3:31
4.	"Un œil sur la bagarre"	3:17
5.	"Irradié"	4:43

Side B
No.	Title	Length
6.	"L'Ange et le Salaud"	3:12
7.	"La Fille au cœur d'acier"	4:05
8.	"L'Hymne aux paumés"	4:26
9.	"Le Courage de vivre"	4:20
10.	"Ballade pour un matin"	4:51

== Personnel ==
=== Musicians ===
- Jacques Higelin - keyboards, banjo, vocals.
- Simon Boissezon - guitars, bass guitar.
- Louis Bertignac - guitar.
- Patrick Giani - drums, percussion.

=== Production ===
- Dominique Mallegni - photographs.
