= Jacques "Crabouif" Higelin =

Studio album by Jacques Higelin
- Released: 1971
- Recorded: Studio des Abbesses
- Genre: Chanson
- Length: 41:03
- Label: Saravah
- Producer: Jacques Higelin

Jacques Higelin chronology
Higelin et Areski (1969)	Jacques "Crabouif" Higelin (1971)	BBH 75 (1974)

Jacques "Crabouif" Higelin is the third album by French rock singer Jacques Higelin, released in 1971 on the Saravah label, for whom it would be his last release. "Crabouif" was Higelin's nickname at the time. The music on this album is mostly minimalistic, improvised, and experimental.

== Track listing ==
Side A
No.	Title	Writer(s)	Length
1.	"I Love the Queen"	Jacques Higelin	4:56
2.	"Tiens, j'ai dit tiens"	Higelin	4:34
3.	"Je suis mort, qui dit mieux"	Higelin	6:00
4.	"Aujourd'hui Blues"	Higelin	5:16

Side B
No.	Title	Writer(s)	Length
5.	"Musique rituelle du Mont des Abbesses (XXe siècle - XVIIIe siècle arrondissement)"	Higelin	20:17

== Personnel ==
=== Musicians ===
- Jacques Higelin - piano, banjo, various instruments, vocals.
- Jean Querlier - flute.
- Joël Favreau - guitar.
- Arthur H - child voice.
- Areski Belkacem, Jim Cuomo, Elliott Delman, Annie the Hat, Jack Treese, Jean-Louis Lefevre, Jean-Pierre Arnoux, Deddy, "Naga", Elie and Kuëlan

=== Production ===
- Jacques Higelin - producer, cover art.
- Daniel Vallencien, Jéhol Van Bay - recording.
- Patrick Ghnassia - photographs.
