= 1st Globes de Cristal Awards =

French award ceremony for the arts

- Date: 13 March 2006
- Site: Luxembourg Palace, Paris, France
- Hosted by: Patrick Poivre d'Arvor

The 1st Globes de Cristal Award ceremony honoured the best French movies, actors, actresses, plays, concerts, novels, singers, TV series, exhibitions and fashion designers of 2005 and took place on 13 March 2006 at the Luxembourg Palace in Paris. The ceremony was chaired and hosted by Patrick Poivre d'Arvor.

== Winners and nominees ==
The winners are denoted in bold.

=== Cinema ===
Best Film
- **The Beat That My Heart Skipped** - **Jacques Audiard**
- Russian Dolls - Cédric Klapisch
- Joyeux Noël - Christian Carion
- The Young Lieutenant - Xavier Beauvois
- Live and Become - Radu Mihăileanu
Best Actor
- **Romain Duris** - **The Beat That My Heart Skipped**
- Michel Bouquet - The Last Mitterrand
- Clovis Cornillac - Le cactus
- Benoît Poelvoorde - Entre ses mains
- José Garcia - The Axe
Best Actress
- **Nathalie Baye** - **The Young Lieutenant**
- Marion Cotillard - Love Is in the Air
- Elsa Zylberstein - Little Jerusalem
- Catherine Frot - Boudu
- Isabelle Carré - Entre ses mains

=== Television ===
Best TV Series / TV Movie
- **Kaamelott** - **Alexandre Astier & Alain Kappauf**
- Dans la tête du tueur - Claude-Michel Rome
- Clara Sheller - Nicolas Mercier
- Dolmen - Didier Albert
- Les Rois maudits - Josée Dayan
Best TV Show
- **Ushuaia** - **Nicolas Hulot**

=== Theater ===
Best Play
- **Love Letters** - **Sandrine Dumas**
Best Musical
- **Bartabas** - **Battuta**
Best One Man Show
- **Gad Elmaleh** - **La Vie Normale**

=== Literature ===
Best Novel or Essay
- **Dictionnaire égoïste de la littérature française** - **Charles Dantzig**
Best Comic Book
- **Histoires inédites du Petit Nicolas** - **René Goscinny & Jean-Jacques Sempé**

=== Music ===
Best Female Singer
- **Camille** - **Le Fil**
Best Male Singer
- **Alain Souchon** - **La Vie Théodore**

=== Others ===
Best Multimedia Artist
- **Raymond Depardon**
Best Architect
- **Jean Nouvel**
Best Designer
- **Florence Doléac**
Best Fashion Designer
- **Jean-Paul Gaultier**

== See also ==
- 31st César Awards
