= No Man's Land (Jacques Higelin album) =

Studio album by Jacques Higelin
- Released: April 1978
- Recorded: September 1977 at the Château d'Hérouville, France
- Genre: French rock
- Label: Pathé-Marconi/EMI
- Producer: Jacques Higelin

Jacques Higelin chronology
15 chansons d'avant le déluge, suite et fin (1976)	No Man's Land (1978)	Champagne et Caviar (1978)

No Man's Land is the seventh album by French rock singer Jacques Higelin, released in April 1978. The song "Pars" was covered by Grace Jones on her Warm Leatherette album in 1980.

== Recording ==
Higelin was reportedly dissatisfied with the record, and wanted to destroy the tapes to avoid releasing it, but was persuaded otherwise by his friends, musicians Laurent Thibaut and Francis Moze. Higelin came later to appreciate it somewhat.

== Track listing ==
No.	Title	Writer(s)	Length
1.	"Banlieue Boogie Blues"	Jacques Higelin	4:10
2.	"Pars"	Higelin	3:48
3.	"Denise"	Higelin	3:04
4.	"Un aviateur dans l'ascenseur"	Higelin	4:29
5.	"Lettre à la p'tite amie de l'ennemi public no 1"	Higelin	4:09
6.	"L... comme beauté"	Higelin	5:03
7.	"Les Robots"	Higelin	3:14
8.	"L'Amour sans savoir ce que c'est"	Higelin	10:28

== Charts and certifications ==
=== Charts ===
Chart (1978)	Peak position
France (SNEP)	1

=== Certification ===
Region	Certification	Certified units/sales
France (SNEP)	Gold	100,000^{*}
^{*} Sales figures based on certification alone.

== Personnel ==
=== Musicians ===
- Jacques Higelin: vocals, keyboards, Korg, pianos, accordion, bass guitar
- Pierre Chérèze: guitars
- Dan Ar Braz: guitars
- Jacky Thomas: bass guitar
- Serge Perathoner: keyboards
- Jean Cirillo: drums
- Michel Santangeli: drums
- Christian Leroux: guitar
- Les petits chanteurs de l'école de Bondy: background vocals

=== Production ===
- Laurent Thibault, Christophe Bonno, Michel Marie: recording
- Christian Orsini, studio Translab: mastering
- Dominique Mallegni: photographs
- Bruno Ducourant: design
