= Izïa =

French musician

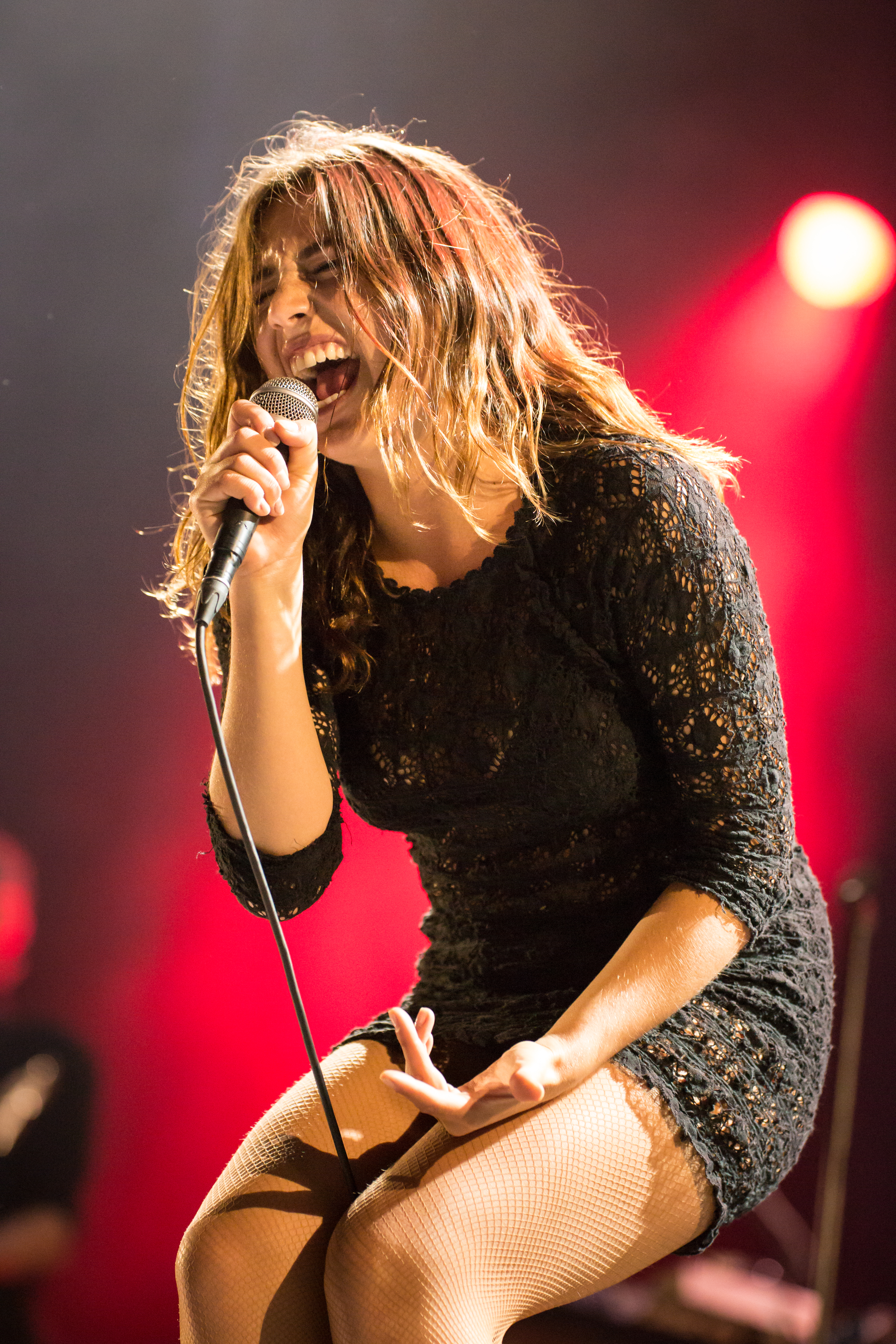
- Izia at the Week-end des Curiosités, Ramonville, 2015

Background information
- Born: Izïa Anna Rosine Higelin; 24 September 1990 (age 35); Paris, France
- Origin: Paris, France
- Genres: Rock
- Instruments: Vocals, electric guitar, piano.
- Years active: 2006–present
- Label: Universal
- Website: Official website

Izïa Anna Rosine Higelin (French pronunciation: [izja ana ʁozin iʒlɛ̃]; born 24 September 1990), more commonly known by her stage name Izïa, is a French rock singer, guitarist and actress. Her most recent album, La Vitesse, was released in 2022. In May 2026, she released a single titled Mieux que nous.

== Early life ==
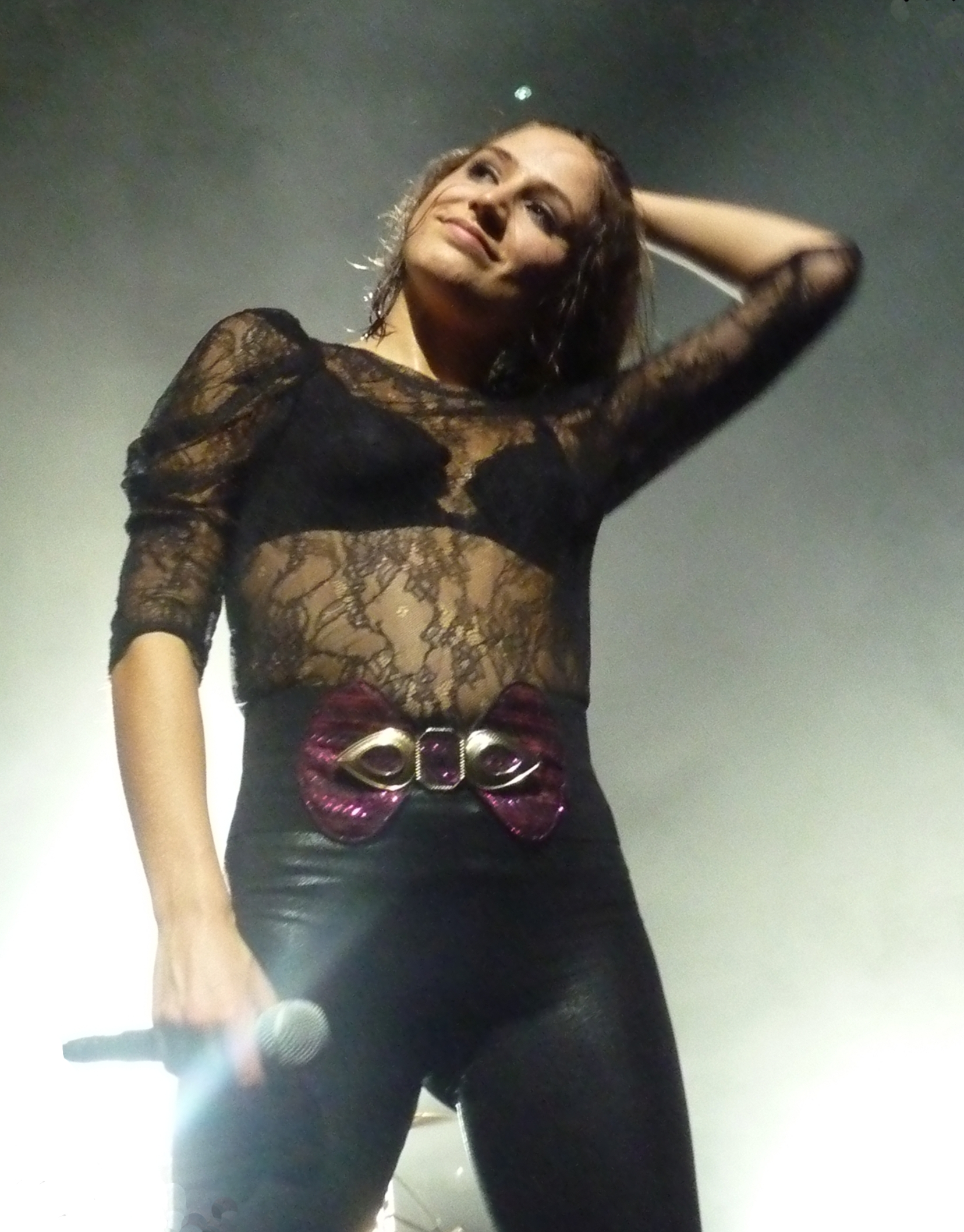
Izïa at an Aéronef concert in Lille in 2010.

Izïa was born in Paris on 24 September 1990 to Jacques Higelin, a famous French singer of Belgian and Alsatian descent, and Aziza Zakine, a dancer and chorist of Tunisian descent. She comes from a family of artists; beside her father and mother, her two older half brothers are Arthur H and Kên Higelin, both active in performing arts.

She was influenced by music from an early age, when her father introduced her to jazz and British pop music. At the age of seven, she formed a duo with her father; she provided the vocals while he played piano.

== Career ==
=== Music ===
When she was 13, Izïa started to take an interest in rock bands such as Nirvana and Led Zeppelin. At this time, she wrote her first song, titled "Hey Bitch", which later featured on her debut album.

A year later she met Caravan Palace bassist Antoine Toustou through her parents and the pair played their first live show in 2004. Six months later, her backing group was expanded to three people when Izïa and Toustou were joined by Sébastien Hoog and Vincent Polycarpe. She left school at the age of 15 in order to concentrate on a career in music.

In 2006, Izïa released her first extended play and the following year she opened for Iggy & the Stooges at the Printemps de Bourges music festival. She consequently embarked on a tour of France, which consisted of over thirty dates. On 8 June 2009, her eponymous debut studio album, Izia, was released in France. In some reviews, the album garnered comparisons to Janis Joplin. The album performed reasonably well in the French albums chart, achieving a peak position of #31 and staying in the top 100 for 17 consecutive weeks.

Izïa has since released three more albums that reached the charts in France: So Much Trouble (2011), La Vague (2015), and Citadelle (2019). In 2021, Izïa contributed a cover of the Metallica song "My Friend of Misery" to the charity tribute album The Metallica Blacklist.

=== Film ===
Izïa made her film debut in 2012, appearing in the film Bad Girl under her full name, Izia Higelin. She was nominated for several awards for her performance, including the César Award for Most Promising Actress. Since then, she has continued to act sporadically, appearing in the 2015 film Summertime and playing Camille Claudel in the 2017 film Rodin.

== Discography ==
=== Studio albums ===
Year	Album	Peak positions			Certification
Year	Album	FR	BEL (Wa)	SWI	Certification
2009	Izia	24	—	—	
2011	So Much Trouble	10	96	—	
2015	La Vague	13	52	—	
2019	Citadelle	13	—	60	
2022	La vitesse	26	70	99	

=== Singles ===
Year	Album	Peak positions	Singles
Year	Album	FR	Singles
2009	"So Much Trouble"	84	So Much Trouble
2009	"La Vague"	80	La Vague
2026	-	-	Mieux que nous

== Filmography ==
Year	Title	Role	Director	Notes
2012	Bad Girl	Louise	Patrick Mille	César Award for Most Promising Actress; Nominated—Lumière Award for Most Promising Actress; Nominated—Globes de Cristal Award for Best Actress
2014	Samba	Manu	Olivier Nakache; Eric Toledano	Nominated—César Award for Best Supporting Actress
2014	Fils de		Hervé P. Gustave	
2014	Mune: Guardian of the Moon	Glim	Alexandre Heboyan; Benoît Philippon	
2015	Summertime	Delphine	Catherine Corsini	Nominated—Lumière Award for Best Actress
2016	Saint-Amour		Benoît Delépine; Gustave de Kervern	
2017	Rodin	Camille Claudel	Jacques Doillon	
2021	La Vengeance au Triple Galop	Debby Harper	Alex Lutz & Arthur Sanigou	TV film
2022	The Takedown (Loin du périph)	Alice Gautier	Louis Leterrier	Netflix
2022	Tower of Strength		Louis Leterrier	Filming
2024	Juliette au printemps	Juliette Tarlidch	Blandine Lenoir	
