= Bad Girl (2012 film) =

2012 French drama film

- Film poster
- French: Mauvaise fille
- Directed by: Patrick Mille
- Written by: Patrick Mille
- Based on: Mauvaise Fille by Justine Lévy
- Produced by: Laurent & Michèle Pétin; Dimitri Rassam; Jeremy Burdek; Serge de Poucques; Sylvain Goldberg; Nadia Khamlichi; Adrian Politowski; Gilles Waterkeyn; Charlotte Corrigan
- Starring: Carole Bouquet; Arthur Dupont; Izïa; Bob Geldof
- Cinematography: Jérôme Alméras
- Edited by: Yann Dedet
- Music by: Syd Matters
- Production companies: Chapter 2 uMedia
- Distributed by: ARP Sélection
- Release date: 28 November 2012
- Running time: 108 minutes
- Country: France
- Language: French
- Budget: $5.1 million
- Box office: $480, 000

Bad Girl (French: Mauvaise Fille) is a 2012 French drama film directed by Patrick Mille.

== Plot ==
Louise will have a child. Her mother, in remission from chemotherapy, and her father, a rock singer, resume contact with her.

== Cast ==
- Carole Bouquet as Alice
- Arthur Dupont as Pablo
- Izïa as Louise
- Bob Geldof as George
- Jacques Weber as Professor Lecoq
- Joana Preiss as Brigitte
- Eric Savin as Doctor Lippi
- Laurent Cotillard as Pascal
- Pierre Louis-Calixte as Hervé
- Lison Mailhol as Angèle
- Joseph Malerba as Pablo's friend
- Marcel Bozonnet as The Monk
- Benoît Jacquot as The Director
- Patrick Pelloux as The Doctor

== Accolades ==
Award	Category	Recipient	Result
César Award	César Award for Most Promising Actress	Izïa	Won
Globes de Cristal Award	Globes de Cristal Award for Best Actress	Izïa	Nominated
Lumière Awards	Lumière Award for Most Promising Actress	Izïa	Nominated
Étoiles d'Or	Best Female Newcomer	Izïa	Won
