= Radu Mihăileanu =

Romanian-French film director and screenwriter (born 1958)

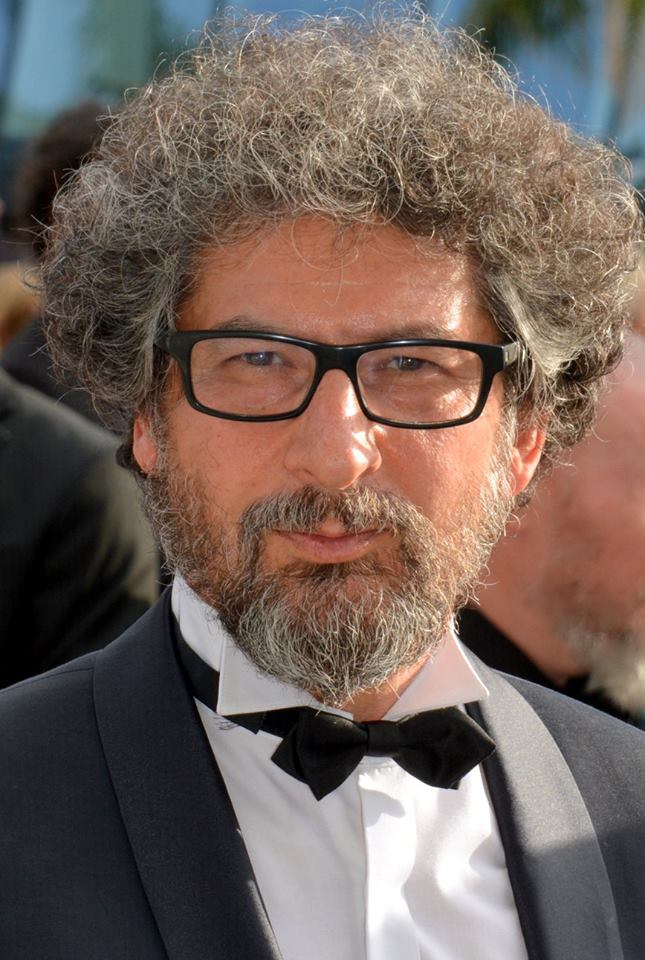
- Mihăileanu at Cannes Film Festival in 2018
- Born: 23 April 1958 (age 68); Bucharest, Romania
- Education: Institut des hautes études cinématographiques
- Occupations: Film director; screenwriter
- Years active: 1980–present
- Honours: Officier de l'Ordre des Arts et des Lettres (2014)

Radu Mihăileanu (born 23 April 1958) is a Romanian film director and screenwriter. In addition to his work in cinema, he published a book of poems in 1987 titled Une vague en mal de mer. His film The Source premiered in competition at the 2011 Cannes Film Festival.

== Filmography ==
Year	Title	Credited as				Notes
Year	Title	Director	Screenwriter	Producer	Other	Notes
1980	Les Quatre Saisons	Yes				Short film
1984	Swann in Love				Yes	Assistant editor
1985	A View to a Kill				Yes	Assistant director: stunt unit (uncredited)
1986	I Love You				Yes	Assistant director
1988	Y'a bon les Blancs				Yes	Assistant director
1988	Les Saisons du plaisir				Yes	Assistant director
1989	Twisted Obsession				Yes	First assistant director
1989	Mensonge d'un clochard	Yes	Yes			Short film
1989	Le Banquet		Yes			Telefilm
1990	Every Other Weekend				Yes	First assistant director
1992	The Return of Casanova				Yes	First assistant director
1992	Maigret				Yes	TV series; first assistant director
1993	Trahir	Yes	Yes	Yes		Montreal World Film Festival - Grand Prix des Amériques
1997	Bonjour Antoine	Yes				Telefilm
1998	Train of Life	Yes	Yes	Yes		David di Donatello for Best Foreign Film; Venice International Film Festival - FIPRESCI Prize (Best First Feature); Venice International Film Festival - Anicaflash Prize; Nominated—César Award for Best Original Screenplay or Adaptation; Nominated—Grande Prêmio Cinema Brasil - Best Foreign Language Film
2002	Les Pygmées de Carlo	Yes	Yes			Telefilm
2005	Live and Become	Yes	Yes	Yes		Berlin International Film Festival - Panorama Audience Award; Berlin International Film Festival - Europa Cinemas Label; Berlin International Film Festival - Prize of the Ecumenical Jury; Boston Jewish Film Festival - Best Feature Film; César Award for Best Original Screenplay; Copenhagen International Film Festival - Best Film; Copenhagen International Film Festival - Best Script; Nashville Film Festival - Audience Choice Award for Best Narrative Feature; Toronto International Film Festival - People's Choice Award (2nd place); Vancouver International Film Festival - Most Popular International Film; Nominated—César Award for Best Film; Nominated—César Award for Best Director; Nominated—Globes de Cristal Award for Best Film
2009	Le Concert	Yes	Yes	Yes		Nashville Film Festival - Southwest Audience Award for Best Narrative Feature; Nominated—César Award for Best Film; Nominated—César Award for Best Director; Nominated—César Award for Best Original Screenplay; Nominated—European Film Award for Best Screenwriter; Nominated—Golden Globe Award for Best Foreign Language Film; Nominated—Lumière Award for Best Screenplay
2011	The Source	Yes	Yes	Yes		Nominated—Cannes Film Festival - Palme d'Or
2014	Les Yeux jaunes des crocodiles				Yes	As actor (Gabor Minar)
2014	Cartoonists - Foot Soldiers of Democracy		Yes	Yes		
2016	The History of Love	Yes	Yes	Yes		
