= Alertez les bébés! =

Studio album by Jacques Higelin
- Released: 1976
- Recorded: August 1976 at Studios Ferber and in a particular house
- Genre: French rock
- Length: 46:21
- Label: Pathé-Marconi/EMI
- Producer: Thierry Vincent

Jacques Higelin chronology
Irradié (1976)	Alertez les bébés! (1976)	15 chansons d'avant le déluge, suite et fin (1976)

Alertez les bébés! is the sixth album by French rock singer Jacques Higelin, released in 1976. The album is named after the central song, a ten-minute-long track, written quickly in a feverish state by the singer, with the recording being made live in one take.

== Critical reception ==
The album received the Grand Prix du Disque de l'Académie Charles Cros. The French edition of Rolling Stone magazine named it the 29th greatest French rock album.

== Track listing ==
All tracks are written by Jacques Higelin.

Side A
No.	Title	Length
1.	"Le Minimum"	5:32
2.	"Géant Jones"	4:56
3.	"La Rousse au chocolat"	3:42
4.	"Je veux cette fille"	2:48
5.	"J'suis qu'un grain de poussière"	4:05

Side B
No.	Title	Length
6.	"Aujourd'hui la crise !"	4:20
7.	"Rien"	4:45
8.	"Coup de blues"	4:13
9.	"Alertez les bébés !"	10:10
10.	"Demain ça s'ra vachement mieux"	1:50

== Personnel ==
=== Musicians ===
- Pierre Chérèze – electric guitar, lead guitar, rhythm guitar
- Christian Leroux – electric guitar, rhythm guitar, acoustic lead guitar
- Jacky Thomas – bass guitar
- Michel Santangelli – drums, tambourine, mandocello
- Jacques Higelin – vocals, keyboards, piano
- Danielle Bartholetti, Françoise Walle – background vocals
- Stéphane Vilar – brass

=== Production ===
- Paul Semama: recording, mixing
- Thierry Vincent: production
