= Grégoire Delacourt =

French film director, screenwriter and writer

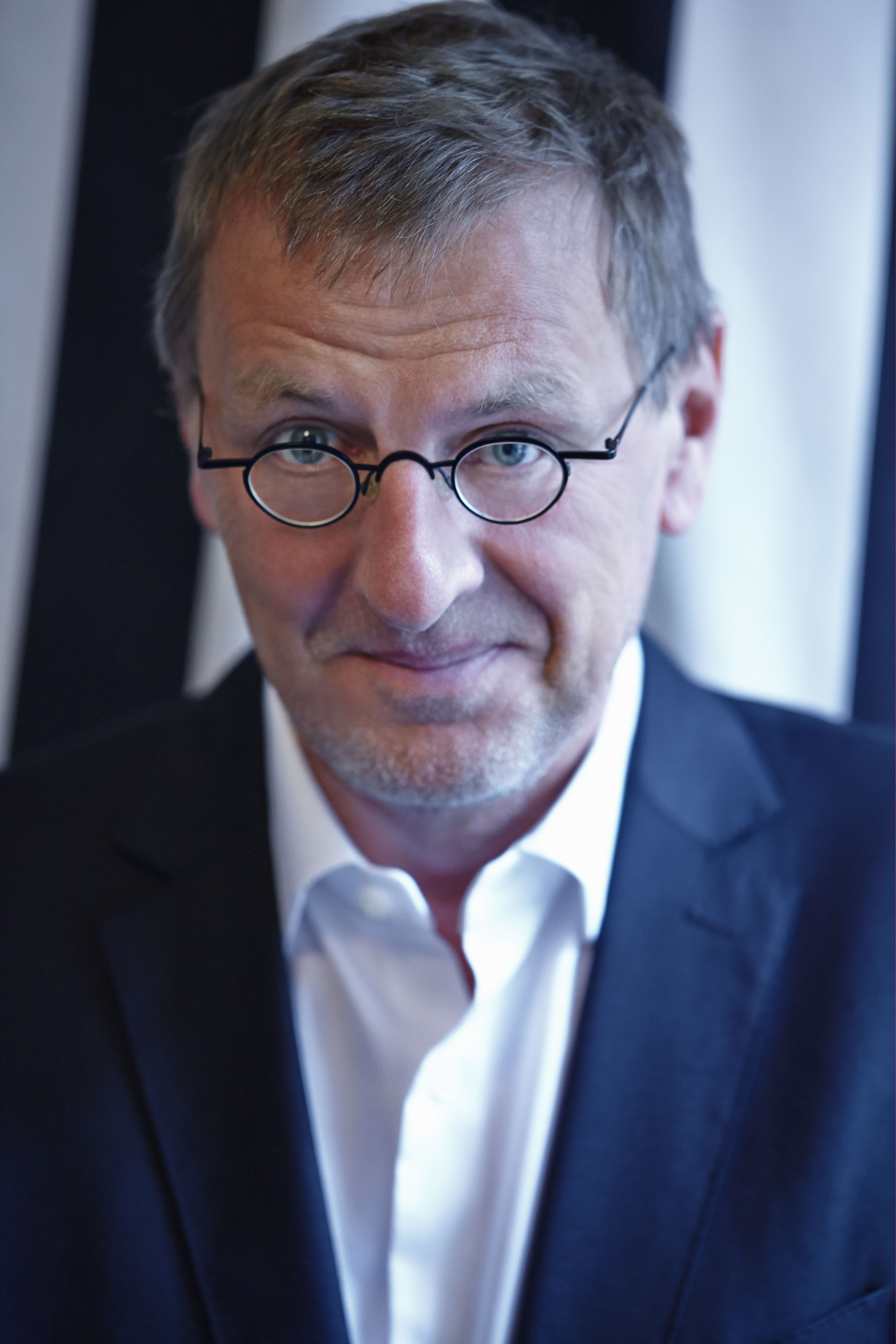
Grégoire Delacourt

Grégoire Delacourt (born 26 July 1960 in Valenciennes) is a French advertiser and writer.

== Biography ==
In his youth, Delacourt was an intern at the Jesuit College "La Providence" in Amiens (the same college that current French president Emmanuel Macron attended 17 years later). He obtained his baccalauréat in Lille and then began law studies in Grenoble, which he quickly put an end to. He became a publicist in 1982 and in 2004, created with his wife Dana Philp his own advertising agency, Quelle Belle Journée ("What a beautiful day") with which he signed contracts with brands such as Sephora, GO Sport, Caudalie, Folio (Éditions Gallimard), Taittinger, Crozatier, Directours, Unilever... It was following his dismissal from his previous company that he decided to found his own agency.

He published his first novel at the age of fifty, "L'Écrivain de la famille", (more than 20,000 copies sold in large format, 100,000 in pocket-sized edition) then La Liste de mes envies in 2012 which quickly became a bestseller with more than 500,000 copies sold before its release in the Livre de Poche edition where it exceeded 600,000 copies. La Liste de mes envies was adapted to the theater by Mikaël Chirinian, directed by Anne Bouvier and produced by Salomé Lelouch, played from January to May 2013 at Ciné 13 Théâtre. It was later revived at the Festival d'Avignon at the Off and again at Ciné 13 Théâtre from September 2014 until 12 January 2015. This adaptation won Mikaël Chirinian a nomination to the 2014 Molière Award in the Seul en scène ("alone on stage") category. The cinematographic adaptation, produced by Clémentine Dabadie and Thomas Viguier, was entrusted to Didier Le Pêcheur with Mathilde Seigner, Marc Lavoine and Patrick Chesnais in the leading roles. The film was released in May 2014 and totaled more than 440,000 entries. In October 2016, a new theatrical version was created in Montreal, adaptation by Maryse Warda, direction by Marie-Thérèse Fortin, with Marie-Chantal Perron in the role of Jocelyne. In January 2017, a third theatrical version was created in Brussels at the Théâtre de la Samaritaine, adapted and interpreted by Lorette Goosse and directed by Christian Dalimier.

His third novel, La Première chose qu'on regarde, was released in April 2013. Actress Scarlett Johansson sued, claiming the book was defamatory and exploited her name and image. The judge found the book to be defamatory and awarded Johansson 2500 euros, while rejecting the remaining claims. The book sold more than 150,000 copies.

On ne voyait que le bonheur, published on 20 August 2014, appeared on the first list of the Prix Goncourt and entered the second list of the 2015 Prix des Libraires. It came second to the Prix Goncourt des Lycéens behind Charlotte by David Foenkinos. It won the title of "Best novel of the year 2014" awarded by the journalists of Le Parisien

Les Quatre saisons de l'été were published on 29 April 2015 and stage, in the same summer at Touquet Paris-Plage, the summer loves of four couples, fifteen, thirty-five, fifty-five and sixty-fifteen. In Germany, the book ranked in the Top 10 list of Der Spiegel's bestsellers.

His sixth novel, Danser au bord de l'abîme was published on 2 January 2017.

== Bibliography ==
- L'Écrivain de la famille, Paris, Éditions JC Lattès, series "Littérature française", 2011, 250 p. ISBN 978-2-7096-3547-9

- Prix Marcel Pagnol 2011.
- Prix Rive Gauche à Paris 2011.
- Prix Carrefour du Premier Roman 2011.
- Prix Cœur de France 2011.
- Prix du premier roman Méo Camuzet 2011.

- La Liste de mes envies, Paris, Éditions JC Lattès, series "Littérature française", 2012, 186 p. ISBN 978-2-7096-3818-0.

- Prix Méditerranée des Lycéens 2013.
- Prix des Lycéens 2013 de la Ville de Gujan-Mestras.
- Prix Livresse de Lire 2013

- La Première Chose qu'on regarde, Paris, Éditions JC Lattès, series "Littérature française", 2013, 250 p. ISBN 978-2-7096-4286-6
- On ne voyait que le bonheur, Paris, Éditions JC Lattès, series "Littérature française", 2014, 360 p. ISBN 978-2-7096-4746-5

- Prix des Lectrices Edelweiss (Switzerland)
- Prix Goncourt des Fougères 2014.
- Meilleur roman de l'année 2014.

- Les Quatre Saisons de l'été, Paris, Éditions JC Lattès, series "Littérature française", 2015, 270 p. ISBN 978-2-7096-4933-9
- Danser au bord de l’abîme, Paris, Éditions JC Lattès, series. "Littérature française", 2017, 320 p. ISBN 978-2-7096-5956-7
