= Kên Higelin =

French actor and director (born 1972)

Kên Higelin (born 11 February 1972) is a French stage and film actor, theatre director and music video director.

He worked at a young age with theatre director Peter Brook, most notably in La Tempête, a French adaptation of Shakespeare.

He is best known for his music videos for Mathieu Boogaerts and Brigitte Fontaine. He played the lead role of Fausto Barbarico in the 1993 film Fausto, where he portrays a young fashion designer.

== Personal life ==
He is the son of French singer Jacques Higelin and of Kuelan Nguyen, who is Vietnamese. His siblings also became entertainers: his older half brother is singer Arthur H and his younger half sister is singer Izïa Higelin. He is of Vietnamese descent through his mother.

== Theatre ==
- 1985: Mahâbhârata, directed by Peter Brook (Festival d'Avignon)
- 1991: La Tempête of William Shakespeare, directed by Peter Brook, (Théâtre des Bouffes du Nord and Festival d'Avignon)
- 1995: L'Histoire tragique de la vie et de la mort du Dr Faustus of Christopher Marlowe, directed by Stuart Seide, (Théâtre de la Ville)

== Filmography ==
films

- 1993: Fausto as Fausto Barbarico (lead role)

TV series

- 1989: The Mahabharata as deathless boy (TV mini-series)
- 1995: Police des polices (TV series - 1 episode - "Vidéo preuves")

shorts

- 1993: Total!
- 1994: Une femme dans l'ennui
- 1998: Il suffirait d'un pont
