= Yves Lecoq =

French humorist and voice impersonator (born 1946)

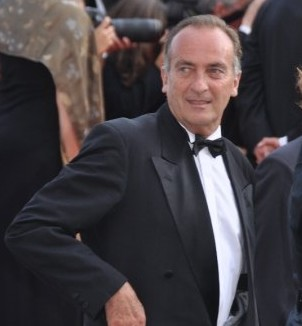
- Lecoq at the 2009 Cannes Film Festival
- Born: Yves Louis Georges Lecoquierre; May 4, 1946 (age 80); Paris, France
- Occupation: Humorist (vocal imitations)
- Television: Les Guignols de l'info

Yves Lecoq (born Yves Louis Georges Lecoquierre on May 4, 1946) is a French humorist known especially for his voice impersonations.

== Early life and education ==
Yves Lecoq was born in the 15th arrondissement of Paris, from a bourgeois francilian family. He became interested at an early age in the comic field, and rather than a career as a lawyer or a journalist, he did not follow his parents and began a career in theater at the age of 16. During his studies at the Lycée Georges Clémenceau in Nantes, he played his first theater role in 1965.

== Career ==
During the 1980s, he was the host of several television programmes, such as Suivez Lecoq (1980-1981), L'Académie des neuf (1987–1991 on Antenne 2), and Tout le monde il est gentil (1989–1990 on La Cinq). He also hosted the Miss France contest in 1990 and 1991 on FR3.

From September 1988 to June 2018, he was the main vocal impersonator of Les Guignols de l'info broadcast on Canal+, in which he lent his voice to the puppet of show's host Patrick Poivre d'Arvor, as well as the puppets of nearly 200 other public figures. His impression of former French Jacques Chirac, one of the show's most popular caricatures, was one of the biggest contributors to Lecoq's public fame.

He participated to the concerts of Les Enfoirés from 1994 to 2000, as well as in 2005. He has also presented various programs such as Graines de star in 1996 and 1997 on M6, and Les Grands du Rire on France 3 from 2005 onwards.

He took part in 2019 in the french port of the famous Masked Singer TV franchise, inside the Dino character. He was eliminated in the fourth episode, aired 29 November 2019, and unmasked to overall surprise as he wasn't found by the panelists or live audience.

== Personal life ==
He bought in 2008 the Château de Chambes in Roumazières-Loubert, Charente, the county where his maternal grandparents came from. In December 2011, he also bought the Château de Chalais, in the same department. He is also the owner of the Château de Maisonseule in Saint-Basile, Ardèche.

== Books ==
- Mémoires d'un Guignol, Éditions Robert Laffont, 2007, ISBN 9782221105337
- Fou de châteaux, Yves Lecoq, Roland Beaufre, Éditions du Chêne.
