= Arthur H =

French singer-songwriter

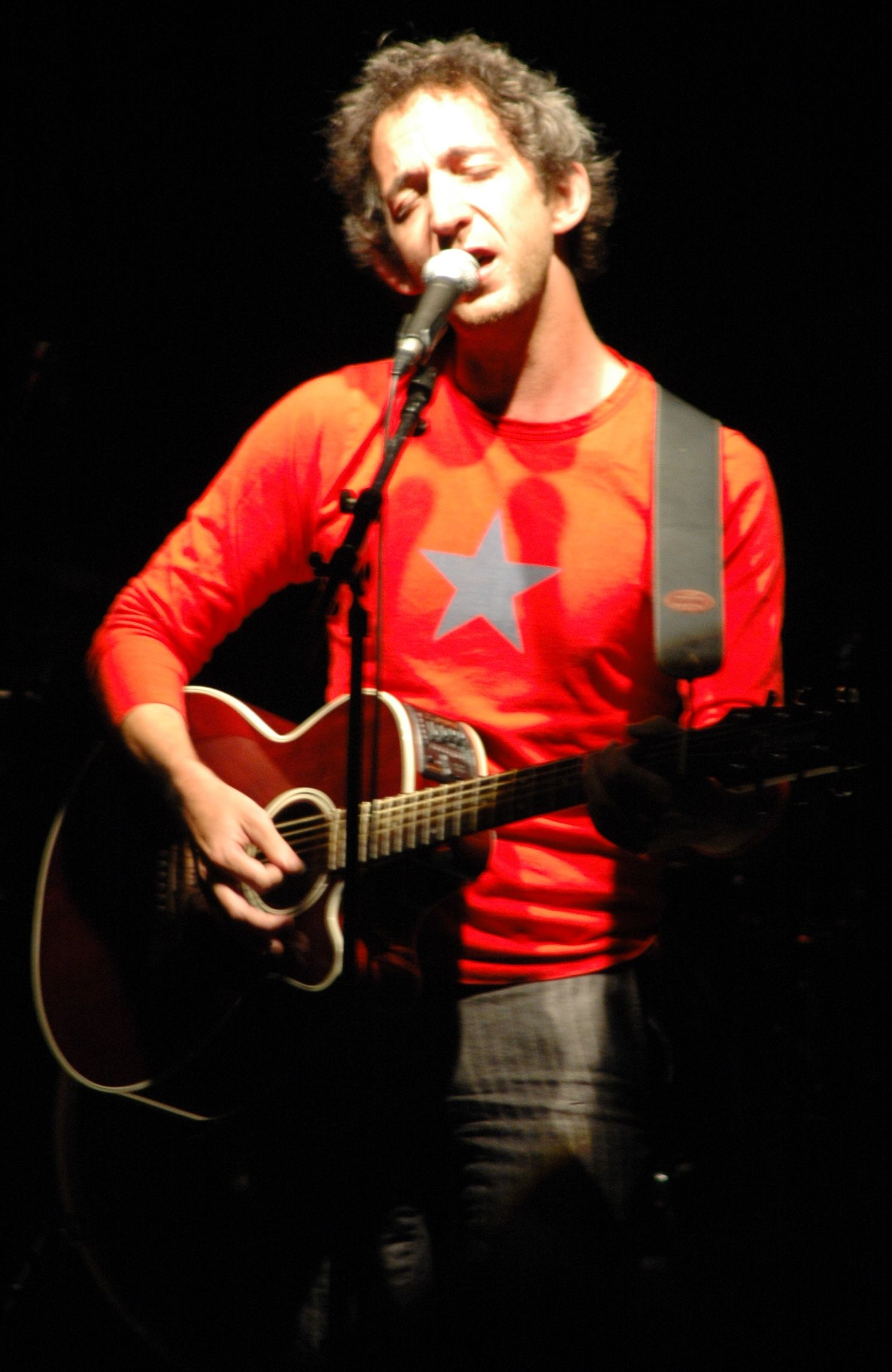
- Arthur H performing in 2007

Background information
- Born: Arthur Higelin; 27 March 1966 (age 60)
- Origin: Paris, France
- Genres: French pop music, experimental, rock, blues, jazz, electronica
- Occupations: Singer, musician, songwriter
- Instruments: Vocals, piano, accordion, jaw harp, didgeridoo, bass, harmonium, organ, guitar
- Years active: 1988–present
- Website: arthurh.net

Arthur Higelin (born 27 March 1966), better known under his stage name Arthur H (IPA: [aʁtyʁ ɑʃ]), is a French singer-songwriter and pianist. He is best known in France for his live performances—four of his albums were recorded live.

== Life and career ==
He is the son of the French singer Jacques Higelin and Nicole Courtois. He has a younger half brother, Ken Higelin, a stage and film actor, theatre director and music video director; and a half sister, Izïa Higelin, a singer.

After traveling in the West Indies, Higelin studied music in Boston, Massachusetts before returning to Paris.

In his home city he developed his eclectic but highly personal musical style, drawing on such influences as Thelonious Monk, Serge Gainsbourg, the Sex Pistols, jazz, blues, Middle Eastern music and the tango. He first performed in 1988 in clubs in Paris, as leader of a trio with bassist Brad Scott and drummer Paul Jothy.

His first album, Arthur H (1990), combined rhythmic experimentation and bal-musette elements with a vocal style that has been compared to Tom Waits. He toured widely around this time, particularly in France and Japan, adding a fourth band member, Jon Handelsman (saxophone). They produced a second album, Bachibouzouk (1992).

In early 1993, Higelin and his band did a six-week season at the Magic Mirrors, an antique circus big top. They later produced it as a touring show and recorded it on the live album En chair et en os.

In 1996, he released the album Trouble Fête, following which he performed a season at the Gymnase in Paris. The live album Fête Trouble (1997) included some tracks from these shows as well as others recorded on tour in Africa. He toured the United States and Canada in 1998.

In 2000, he wrote the soundtrack for Michel Couvelard's film, Inséparables, before touring in Asia and Canada. His next album, Pour Madame X (2000), featured the touring band of Nicolas Repac (guitar), Brad Scott (double bass) and Laurent Robin (drums).

In 2001, he took part in the show Le Cabaret Imprudent with "Le Cirque Cahin-caha". The following year, he released the album Piano Solo, recorded live in a studio and mainly consisting of solo interpretations of earlier songs. This was followed by a band album, Négresse Blanche (2003), comprising tracks dedicated to the memory of famous women such as Marilyn Kaddish and Bo Derek.

In 2005, a planned tour of China was cancelled, and he returned to the studio to record the album Adieu Tristesse. This was the most commercially successful of his career, and included several duets, one with his father and another, "Est-ce que tu aimes?", with the musician -M- (Matthieu Chedid). He subsequently toured widely in France, Lebanon and Canada.

In 2006, he published a book, Onirique attaque, containing lyrics, reflections and photographs. He also composed the soundtrack for the film L'homme qui rêvait d'un enfant, directed by Delphine Gleize. The soundtrack was performed by an ensemble of children from a local music school.

The album Show Time, issued late in 2006, was recorded live on tour and includes duets with Matthieu Chedid, Pauline Croze, Lhasa de Sela and Jacques Higelin. In June 2008 he released the album L'Homme du Monde, which won the award of Pop/Rock Album of the Year 2009 at La Victoire de la Musique.

His 2010 double CD, Mystic Rumba, contained 24 songs from his repertoire performed solo at the piano, the result in part of a snow storm which cut the power in his studio during recording. The next album, Baba Love, was released in October 2011. In 2012, he collaborated with Nicolas Repac on the album L'Or Noir, comprising musical settings of poems by Caribbean writers.

== Discography ==
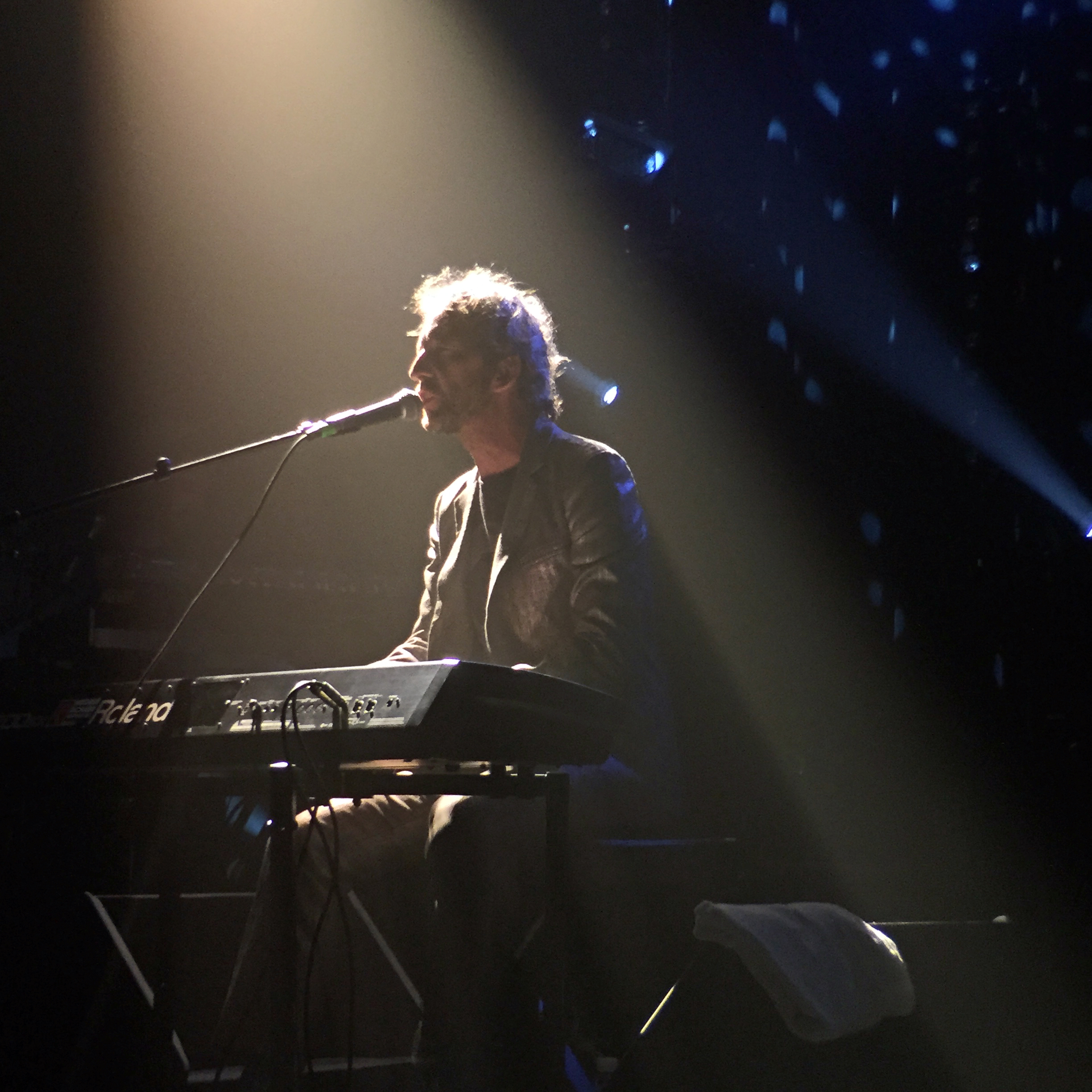
Arthur H performing in 2015

=== Albums ===
Year	Album	Peak positions		
Year	Album	FRA	BEL (Wa)	SWI
1990	Arthur H	—	—	—
1991	Cool Jazz (remixes)	—	—	—
1992	Bachibouzouk	—	—	—
1996	Trouble-Fête	—	—	—
2000	Pour Madame X	62	—	—
2003	Négresse Blanche	49	—	—
2005	Adieu Tristesse	16	58	—
2008	L'Homme du Monde	14	45	—
2010	Mystic Rumba	49	81	—
2011	Baba Love	13	—	—
2012	L'Or Noir (jointly with Nicolas Repac)	—	—	—
2014	Soleil Dedans	12	47	—
2014	L'Or d'Éros (jointly with Nicolas Repac)	—	—	—
2016	Les souliers rouges (jointly with Cœur de Pirate & Marc Lavoine)	6	7	40
2018	Amour Chien Fou	10	70	57
2021	Mort prématurée d'un chanteur populaire dans la force de l'âge	78	—	—
2023	La vie	12	165	—

=== Compilation albums ===
- 2009: 2 For 1: Arthur H + Trouble-fête
- 2010: 2 For 1: Négresse blanche + Adieu tristesse
- 2011: Master Serie
- 2012: Les 50 Plus Belles Chansons (3-CD compilation)
- 2015: 2cd originaux: Baba Love / Soleil dedans

=== Live albums ===
Year	Album	Peak positions
Year	Album	FRA
1993	En chair et en os	—
1997	Fête Trouble	—
2002	Piano Solo.	109
2006	Show Time	158

=== Soundtracks ===
- 1999: Inséparables

=== Singles ===
Year	Title	Peak positions	Album
Year	Title	FRA	Album
2014	"Oh là-haut!"	175	Soleil dedans
2016	"Vivre ou ne pas vivre" (with Cœur de Pirate & Marc Lavoine)	14	Les souliers rouges
2017	"La boxeuse amoureuse"	—	

== Books published ==
- 2006: Onirique attaque

== Awards ==
- 1993: Victoires de la Musique (France) – Popular music – best male newcomer (révélation)
- 2006: Victoires de la Musique – Music video of the year for Est Ce Que Tu Aimes
- 2009: Victoires de la Musique – Pop/rock album of the year for L'Homme du Monde
