= International Francophone Press Union =

Union internationale de la presse francophone
- Abbreviation: UPF
- Formation: 1950
- Type: INGO
- Official language: French
- President: Alfred Dan Moussa

The International Francophone Press Union (French: Union internationale de la presse francophone, UPF) is a Francophone association of journalists. Founded in 1950, it is the world's oldest Francophone organisation, and has more than 3,000 members in 110 countries.

== History ==
The association was founded in 1950 in Limoges, France on the initiative of Canadian journalist Émile-Dostaler O'Leary, who served as the organisation's first president. It formally changed its name from Union internationale des journalistes et de la presse de langue français (English: International Union of French-language Journalists and Press) to Union internationale de la presse francophone on October 24, 2001, at its 33rd meeting in Beirut, Lebanon.

== Activities ==
The UPF's aim is to advance cooperation between the Francophone media of the world. Although initially a venue for French-speaking journalists to convene, over time the UPF became a professional union. It is an international nongovernmental organisation recognised by the European Parliament, La Francophonie, and the United Nations, among others.

=== Prix de la libre expression ===
In 1991, the association (at the time still known as the UIJPLF), in cooperation with La Francophonie, created the Prix de la libre expression (English: Prize for Freedom of Expression). The prize is awarded annually to journalists who remain objective despite harassment or persecution. Past recipients of the prize include Michel Auger (2000), Le Rénovateur (2003), and May Chidiac (2005).

== Leadership ==
As of August 2008, Alfred Dan Moussa of Côte d'Ivoire is the president of the UPF.

== See also ==
- Agence France-Presse
