= Hervé Bourges =

French journalist (1933–2020)

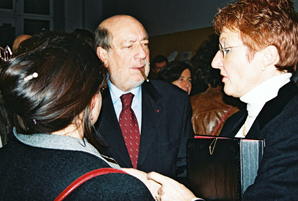
- Hervé Bourges during the celebrations of the 80th anniversary of the ESJ, 2004
- Born: 2 May 1933; Rennes, France
- Died: 23 February 2020 (aged 86); Paris, France
- Occupation: Journalist

Hervé Bourges (2 May 1933 – 23 February 2020) was a French journalist and audiovisual executive. He became the director of the École supérieure de journalisme de Lille in 1976. He directed the likes of Radio France internationale, TF1, and Radio Monte Carlo. It was under his leadership that Antenne 2 and FR3 were renamed as France 2 and France 3, thus forming the group France Télévisions. He was appointed Ambassador of France to UNESCO in 1993. In 1995, François Mitterrand appointed him Director of the Conseil supérieur de l'audiovisuel, and in 2001 led the International Francophone Press Union.

== Biography ==
Hervé was born in 1933 to Joseph Bourges and Marie-Magdeleine Desjeux. He was raised in Rennes, and then began his studies with the Jesuits in Reims. After he graduated from the École supérieure de journalisme de Lille in 1956, Bourges turned down an offer from Le Figaro, and instead worked at Témoignage chrétien, which campaigned against the Algerian War. He advocated for Algerian freedom, and was assigned to Metz in 1958 to serve in a helicopter unit. He was stationed in Aïn Arnat until his return in 1960. When he returned to France, Edmond Michelet entrusted him with files of Algerian prisoners. Upon Michelet's departure in 1961, Bourges returned to journalism at Témoignage chrétien.

In 1962, Bourges became an adviser to Ahmed Ben Bella, and acquired Algerian citizenship. However, he was charged with aiding the rebellion of Hocine Aït Ahmed the following year, and he fled to the mountains of Kabylie. He then fled to Tunisia after the government was overthrown in 1965, but was captured in 1966 and questioned. However, after much pleading by the likes of Monsignor Duval, Edmond Michelet, Bernard Stasi, Jacques Chirac, and Abdelaziz Bouteflika, he was released.

In 1970, Bourges directed the École supérieure internationale de journalisme de Yaoundé in Cameroon. He became director of the École supérieure de journalisme de Lille, and executive director of Radio France internationale, TF1, and Radio Monte Carlo. He aided in the mergers that formed the France Télévisions group. He earned a doctorate of political science in 1981.

He wrote his autobiography, De mémoire d'éléphant, on his time in Algeria, which he loved dearly. He appeared in the documentary Algérie : naissance d'une nation (1956-1962) in 2003, and published a retrospective on television in 2005, titled Sur la télé : mes 4 vérités. In 2012, he wrote the documentary L'Algérie à l'épreuve du pouvoir, directed by Jérôme Sesquin. Sesquin directed another documentary devoted to Bourges in 2012, titled Hervé Bourges, les braises et la lumière, broadcast on France Télévisions and produced by Flach Film. It was released as a part of the Empreintes collection on France 5.

Hervé Bourges died on 23 February 2020 in Paris at the age of 86.

== Career ==
- Editor-in-Chief of Témoignage chrétien (1956)
- Adviser to Ahmed Ben Bella (and acquisition of Algerian citizenship) (1962)
- Director of the École supérieure de journalisme de Yaoundé (1970)
- Director, then President of the École supérieure de journalisme de Lille (1976)
- Spokesperson with UNESCO (1980)
- Director General of Radio France internationale (1981)
- President of TF1 (1983)
- President of Canal+ Horizons (1988)
- Director General of RMC, President of SOFIRAD and Nostalgie (1989)
- President of Antenne 2 and FR3, and aided in merger with France Télévisions (1990)
- Ambassador of France to UNESCO (1993)
- President of the Conseil supérieur de l'audiovisuel (1995)
- President of the International Francophone Press Union (2001)
- President of the Comité permanent de la diversité de France Télévisions (2009)
- President of the academic jury for the festival cinquantenaire des indépendances africaines (2010)

Bourges was often made fun of by the satirical show Les Guignols for his moralistic views on the French audiovisual landscape. On 3 February 2001, he was invited onto Tout le monde en parle by Thierry Ardisson, he said that he did not like Ardisson "talking about 'Cabanis'". This phrase became a recurring gimmick on the show.

== Honors ==
- Commander of the Legion of Honour (2011)

== Publications ==
- L'Algérie à l'épreuve du pouvoir (1967)
- La Révolte étudiante (1968)
- Décoloniser l'information (1976)
- Les cinquante Afriques (1978)
- Une chaîne sur les bras (1987)
- La Télévision du public (1993)
- De mémoire d'éléphant (2000)
- Sur la télé : mes 4 vérités (2005)
- Léopold Sedar Senghor : Lumière Noire (2006)
- Ma rue Montmartre (2007)
- L'Afrique n'attend pas (2010)
- Pardon My French. La langue française, un enjeu du xxie siècle
- J'ai trop peu de temps à vivre pour perdre ce peu : Abécédaire intime (2016)
