= The List of My Desires =

First edition (publ. JC Lattès)

La Liste de mes envies (The List of My Desires) is the second novel by Grégoire Delacourt, published in 2012.

By August 2012, close to 440,000 copies had been sold, with 27 countries having translation rights. A review in L'Express stated, "in a context of economic crisis, this novel touches the readers who rediscover the simple pleasures of life." La Liste de mes envies was adapted for the theater, played in 2013 in Paris, and a movie adaptation was released 18 June 2014.

== Summary ==
Jocelyne is a haberdasher in Arras, married to her first love, an employee of the town's Häagen-Dazs ice-cream factory. They have two grown children who have already left the house. Jocelyne also publishes a well-known blog “dixdoigtsdor”. While content with her life, she often thinks about the life she wanted to have.

Her friends convince her to play lotto “Euro Millions” for the first time, and she wins €18,547,301.28. As she thinks about how her life will be different, she decides not to tell anyone and hide the check. Then, she writes the list of her desires and decides not to change a thing in her life because she doesn't want to lose her happiness. But one day, Jocelyne realizes the check has disappeared. Her husband, supposedly in Switzerland for a training program, does not return. Jocelyne calls his company and learns he took a week off and has run away to Brussels with the check. Her life destroyed, she still continues to see her hospital-ridden father who, due to Alzheimer's disease, forgets everything every six minutes. As for Jocelyn, he lives lavishly but not happily. He knows a wretched loneliness in his too-big house.

Eighteen months later, he decides to write an apology letter to his wife to explain the reasons for his weakness. But since the betrayal, Jocelyne had left her haberdashery to her employee and moved to the south of France. Later, she learns that Jocelyn died alone in his house.
