= Franck Ferrand =

French writer and radio personality

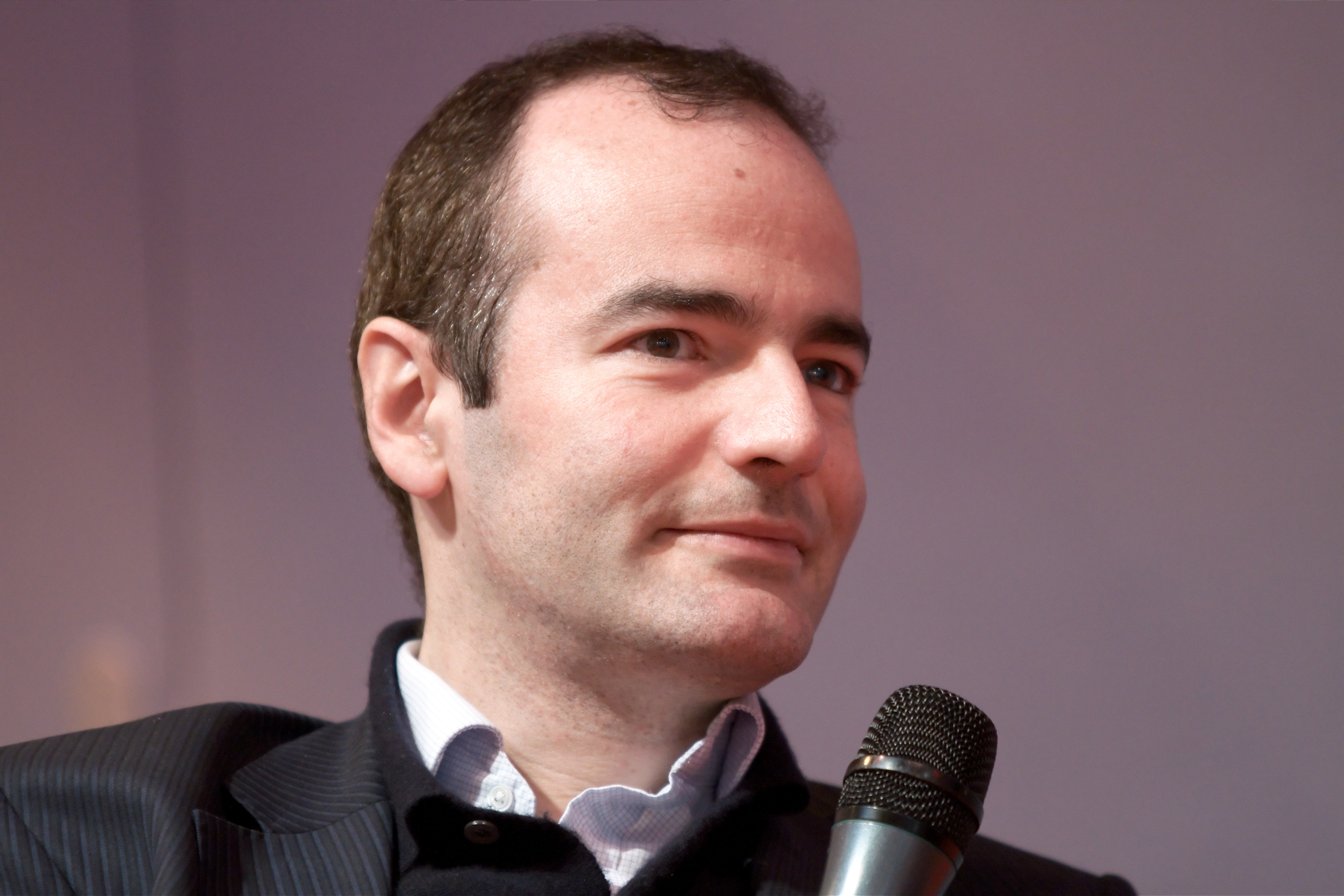
- Franck Ferrand in 2010
- Born: 12 October 1967 (age 58); Poitiers, France
- Education: Sciences Po
- Occupations: Journalist; Essayist

Franck Ferrand (born 12 October 1967 in Poitiers) is a French writer and radio personality who specializes in history. He has a radio show about major figures of French history on Radio Classique, a French Radio station.

== Publications ==
=== Non-fiction ===
- Ils ont sauvé Versailles, Librairie Académique Perrin, 20 février 2003, 367 p., ISBN 978-2262017552
- La grande époque des sports d’hiver, Le Chêne, 3 novembre 2003, 175 p., ISBN 978-2842774752
- Jacques Garcia ou l'éloge du décor, Flammarion, 22 juin 2005, 263 p., ISBN 978-2080114655
- Gérald Van der Kemp : Un gentilhomme à Versailles, Librairie Académique Perrin, 27 octobre 2005, 248 p., ISBN 978-2262024048
- L'Histoire interdite, révélations sur l’histoire de France, Tallandier, 16 octobre 2008, 203 p., ISBN 978-2847344974
- L'ombre des Romanov, XO Éditions, 10 novembre 2010, 368 p., ISBN 978-2845634473
- Au cœur de l'histoire, Flammarion, 26 octobre 2011, 349 p., ISBN 978-2081266384
- Versailles après les rois, Librairie Académique Perrin, coll. « Tempus », 3 mai 2012, 408 p., ISBN 978-2262037680
- Du sang sur l'histoire, Flammarion, 10 octobre 2012, 352 p., ISBN 978-2081284982
- Dictionnaire amoureux de Versailles, Plon, 17 octobre 2013, 557 p., ISBN 978-2259211895
- François Ier, roi de chimères, Flammarion, 24 septembre 2014, 300 p., ISBN 978-2081329959
- L'Histoire au jour le jour, Flammarion, 2015, ISBN 978-2-0813-0018-7

=== Novels ===
- Le Bal des ifs :Mémoires amoureux de la marquise de Pompadour. Flammarion. 2000. pp. 378. ISBN 978-2080679079.
- La Cour des Dames: La Régente Noire. Flammarion. 2007. p. 408. ISBN 978-2080689634.
- La Cour des Dames: Les Fils de France. Flammarion. 2008. p. 378. ISBN 978-2081211087.
- La Cour des Dames: Madame Catherine. Flammarion. 2009. p. 332. ISBN 978-2081221406.
