= List of works by Brigitte Fontaine =

This is a list of works by French avant-garde singer Brigitte Fontaine.

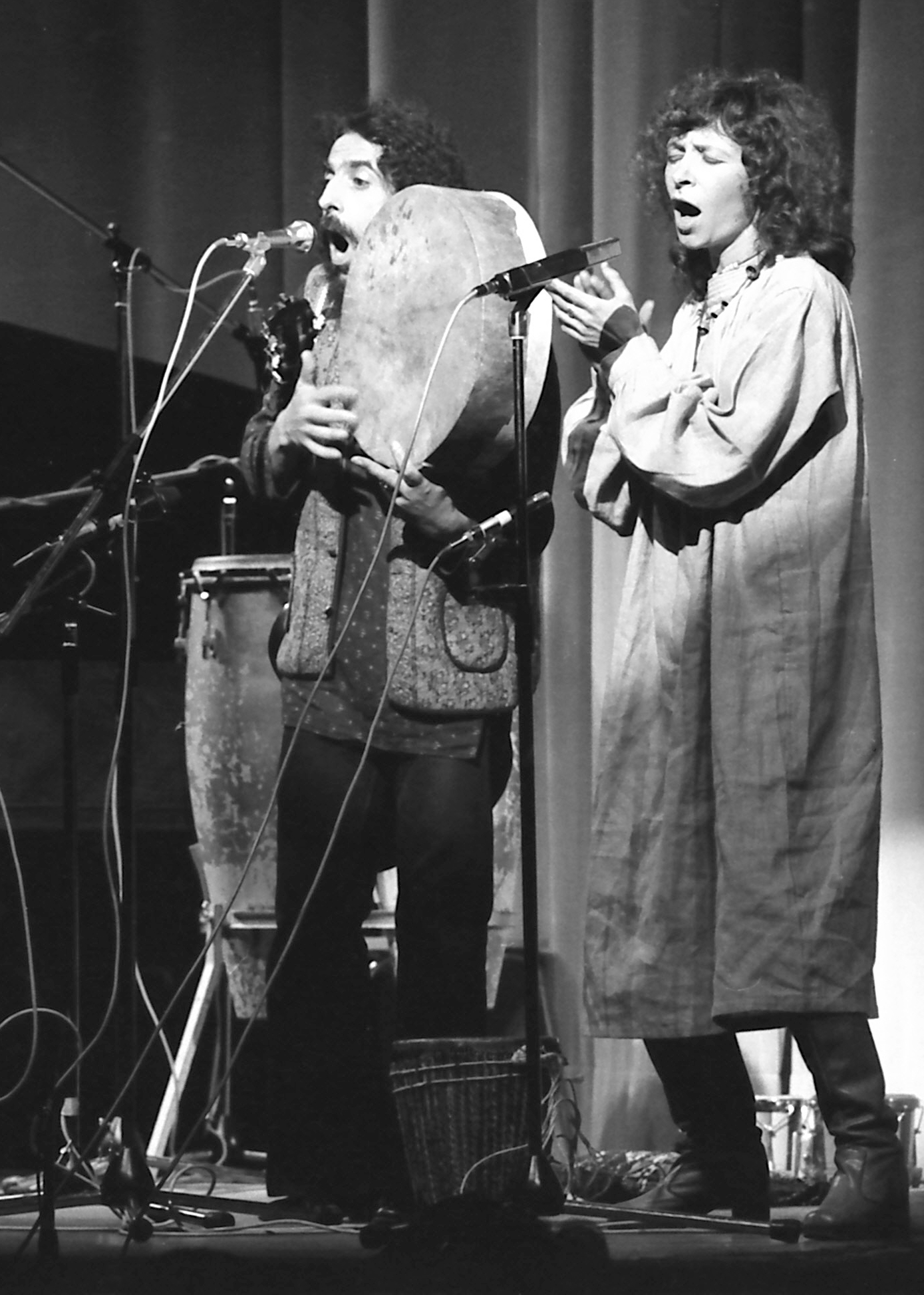
Fontaine performing with Areski Belkacem in 1974

== Discography ==
=== Albums ===
- 13 chansons décadentes et fantasmagoriques, Productions Jacques Canetti, 1966
- Brigitte Fontaine est... folle !, Saravah, 1968
- Comme à la radio (with Areski Belkacem and the Art Ensemble of Chicago), Saravah, 1969
- Brigitte Fontaine, Saravah, 1972
- Je ne connais pas cet homme (with Areski Belkacem), Saravah, 1973
- L'Incendie (with Areski Belkacem), BYG Records, 1974
- Le Bonheur (with Areski Belkacem), Saravah, 1975
- Vous et Nous (with Areski Belkacem), Saravah, 1977
- Les églantines sont peut-être formidables (with Areski Belkacem), RCA-Saravah, 1980
- French corazon, Midi/EMI, 1988
- Genre humain, Virgin, 1995
- Les Palaces, Virgin, 1997
- Kékéland, Virgin, 2001
- Rue Saint Louis en l'Île, Virgin, 2004
- Libido, Polydor, 2006.
- Prohibition, Polydor, 2009
- L'un n'empêche pas l'autre, Polydor, 2011
- J'ai l'honneur d'être, Universal, 2013
- Terre Neuve, Verycords, 2020
- Pick-up, Verycords, 2024

=== Albums with Jacques Higelin ===
- 12 chansons d'avant le déluge, Productions Jacques Canetti, 1966
- 15 chansons d'avant le déluge, suite et fin, Productions Jacques Canetti, 1976

=== Compilations ===
- Morceaux de choix, Virgin, 1999
- Plans fixes, Virgin, 2002

== Other records/participations ==
- "Le goudron" / "Les beaux animaux", Saravah, 1969
- "Quand tous les ghettos brûleront, ça va faire un hit", with Areski Belkacem and Jean-Claude Vannier, BYG Records, 1974
- "Les filles d'aujourd'hui", Carrère-Celluloïd, 1984 (other version in Kékéland, 2001)
- "Amore 529" in Un Drame Musical Instantané / Opération Blow-up, collective album, 1992
- "Supermarket", single, Virgin, 1995
- "On ne tue pas son prochain" in Route Manset, collective tribute to Gérard Manset, 1996
- "La caravane" (music by Duke Ellington) in Jazz à Saint-Germain, collective album, 1997 (and in Morceaux de choix, 1999)
- "Calimero", single with Stereolab, 1998
- "Dressing", single, Virgin, 1999 (and in Morceaux de choix, 1999)
- "Underture", inédit with Sonic Youth, Virgin, 2000
- "Lady Macbeth", inédit with Sonic Youth, Virgin, 2000
- "L'Europe", with Bertrand Cantat, in Des visages des figures, album by Noir Désir, 2001
- "Comme à la radio" and "J'ai 26 ans" (English versions of the sixties) in Vintage de choix, compilation, Virgin, 2001
- "Âme te souvient-il ?" in Avec Léo, collective tribute to Léo Ferré, 2003
- "L'Homme à la moto" in L'Hymne à la môme, collective tribute to Édith Piaf, 2003 (and in Rue Saint-Louis en l'île, 2004)
- "Fine mouche", with Khan, in Disko-Cabine, collective album, 2005
- "Red Light" in Les tremblements s'immobilisent, album by Karkwa, 2005 (and together, on stage, at the festival Les Vieilles Charrues, Carhaix, 2006)
- "Partir ou rester", duet with Olivia Ruiz, Polydor, 2007
- "La beuglante" in Femme d'extérieur, album by Maya Barsony, 2008
- "Bamako" in B, album by Turzi, 2009
- "Je Vous Salue Marie" in Jacno Future, collective tribute to Jacno, 2011,

== Covered by ==
– in studio

- Christine Sèvres : "Les dieux sont dingues" in Christine Sèvres, CBS Records InternationalCBS, 1968
- Christine Sèvres : "Maman, j'ai peur", "Le beau cancer" and "Comme Rimbaud", CBS, 1970
- Aut'Chose : "Comme à la radio" in Vancouver, une nuit comme une autre, CBS, 1975
- Étienne Daho : "Dommage que tu sois mort" in Urgence, collective album, Virgin, 1992
- Philippe Katerine : "La vache enragée" in Morceaux Choisis by The Recyclers, Rectangle, 1997
- Jun Togawa : "Comme à la radio" in "20th Jun Togawa Good-bye 20th Century", God Mountain, 2000
- Faun Fables : "Eternal" (English version of "Éternelle") in Family Album, Drag City Records, 2004
- Étienne Daho and Jane Birkin : "La grippe" in Rendez-vous by Jane Birkin, EMI Music, 2004
- Lucien Francoeur et Aut'Chose : "Comme à la radio" in Chansons d'épouvante, Artic, 2005
- Françoise Hardy and Rodolphe Burger : "Cet enfant que je t'avais fait" in Parenthèses by Françoise Hardy, EMI Music, 2006
- Matthieu Chedid : "Mister Mystère" in Mister Mystère, 2009
- Emmanuelle Seigner : "Quand tu n'es pas là" in Dingue, Columbia, 2010
- Stereo Total : "Barbe à papa" in Baby ouh !, 2010
- Aurelia : "Vous et nous" in The Hour Of The Wolf, 2010
- Johnny Hallyday : "Tanagra" in Jamais seul, 2011
- Stefie Shock : "Dévaste-moi" in La Mécanique de l'amour, 2011
- Yacht : "Le Goudron", single by Yacht, DFA, 2012
- Barbara Carlotti : "Blanche-Neige" in La Fille, 2013
- Zaho de Sagazan : "Ah que la vie est belle", 2023

– on stage

- Dominique A : "Les étoiles et les cochons"
- Arthur H : "Hollywood"
- Christophe : "Hollywood"
- Pierre Lapointe : "La symphonie pastorale"
- Maya Barsony : "Veuve Clicquot"
- Matthieu Chedid et Johnny Hallyday : « Tanagra »
- Bertrand Cantat : "Les vergers"
- Ludivine Sagnier : "Dommage que tu sois mort"

== Other original lyrics ==
- "Toi et ton sax" for Zizi Jeanmaire
- "Les Encerclés", "Le Roi de la naphtaline", "Je veux des coupables" and "Rififi" (in Paradis païen, 1998) for Jacques Higelin
- "Le brouillard", "Chanson pour sa mère", "À chaque tournant", "Bali", "Le dragon", "Les Borgia", "Les murailles", "La tête bandée", "Un soleil", "Les muzdus", "La vache", "Pif", "Salomé", "Le triomphe de l'amour" (2010) for Areski Belkacem
- "Jungle Pulse" and "Toi, Jamais Toujours" for Étienne Daho (in Reserection, 1995, and L'Invitation, 2007)
- "Barbares attraits" (in Toi du monde, 2000) and "Péplum" (in Fais moi une fleur, 2011) for Maurane
- "Irrésistiblement" for Vanessa Paradis (in Divinidylle, 2007)
- "La beuglante" for Maya Barsony
- "Le solitaire" for Juliette Gréco (in Je me souviens de tout, 2009)
- "Phébus", "Tanagra", "Destroy", "Lettre à Tanagra", "Brigand", "Crise" and "Je les adore" for Matthieu Chedid (in Mister Mystère, Barclay, 2009)
- "Elle est SM" for Axel Bauer (in Peaux de serpent, 2013)

== Books ==
- Chroniques du bonheur, éditions des femmes, 1975
- Madelon : Alchimie et prêt-à-porter, récit, éditions Seghers, 1979
- L'Inconciliabule, éditions Tierce, 1980, and éditions Belles Lettres-Archimbaud, 2009
- Paso doble, novel, éditions Flammarion, 1985
- Nouvelles de l'exil, éditions Imprimerie nationale, 1988, and éditions Flammarion, 2006
- Genre humain, Christian Pirot éditeur, 1996
- La Limonade bleue, novel, l’Écarlate, 1997
- Galerie d'art à Kekeland, portrait gallery, éditions Flammarion, 2002
- La Bête Curieuse, novel, éditions Flammarion, 2005
- Attends-moi sous l'obélisque, éditions Seuil-Archimbaud, 2006
- Travellings, novel, éditions Flammarion, 2008
- Rien suivi de Colère noire, éditions Belles Lettres-Archimbaud, 2009
- Contes de chats, with Jean-Jacques Sempé, éditions Belles Lettres-Archimbaud, 2009
- Le bon peuple du sang, éditions Flammarion, 2010
- Mot pour mot, éditions Belles Lettres-Archimbaud, 2011
- Antonio, éditions Belles Lettres-Archimbaud, 2011
- Le bal des coquettes sales (with Léïla Derradji), éditions Belles Lettres-Archimbaud, 2011
- Les Charmeurs de pierres, éditions Flammarion, 2012
- Portrait de l'artiste en déshabillé de soie, Actes Sud, 2012
- Les hommes préfèrent les hommes – histoires, Flammarion, 2014
- Un vitrail de plus, Riveneuve, 2015

== Theater ==
- Maman j'ai peur (with Jacques Higelin and Rufus), Studio des Champs-Elysées, 1966
- Niok, partially improvised show (with Jacques Higelin and Areski Belkacem), Théâtre du Lucernaire, 1969
- Encore, encore et encore, 1969
- Les enfants sont tous fous (with Rufus), 1969
- Acte 2, adaptation of L'Inconciliabule, 1980
- Les marraines de Dieu (with Léïla Derradji), 1986
- Antonio, 1990
- Coup de sang à Fougères (with Thierry Brout), 1993
- Montana-split (with Thierry Brout), 1994
- L'Inconciliabule, Théâtre de Morlaix, 2011 (show canceled)

== Cinema ==
- Le Grand Soir (Benoît Delépine and Gustave Kervern, 2012)
- Brigitte Fontaine, reflets et crudité (Benoît Mouchart and Thomas Bartel, 2013) : herself

== Radio ==
- Les Jeux olympiques de l'orgasme (with Léïla Derradji), 1983
