= Pierre Barouh =

French musician (1934–2016)

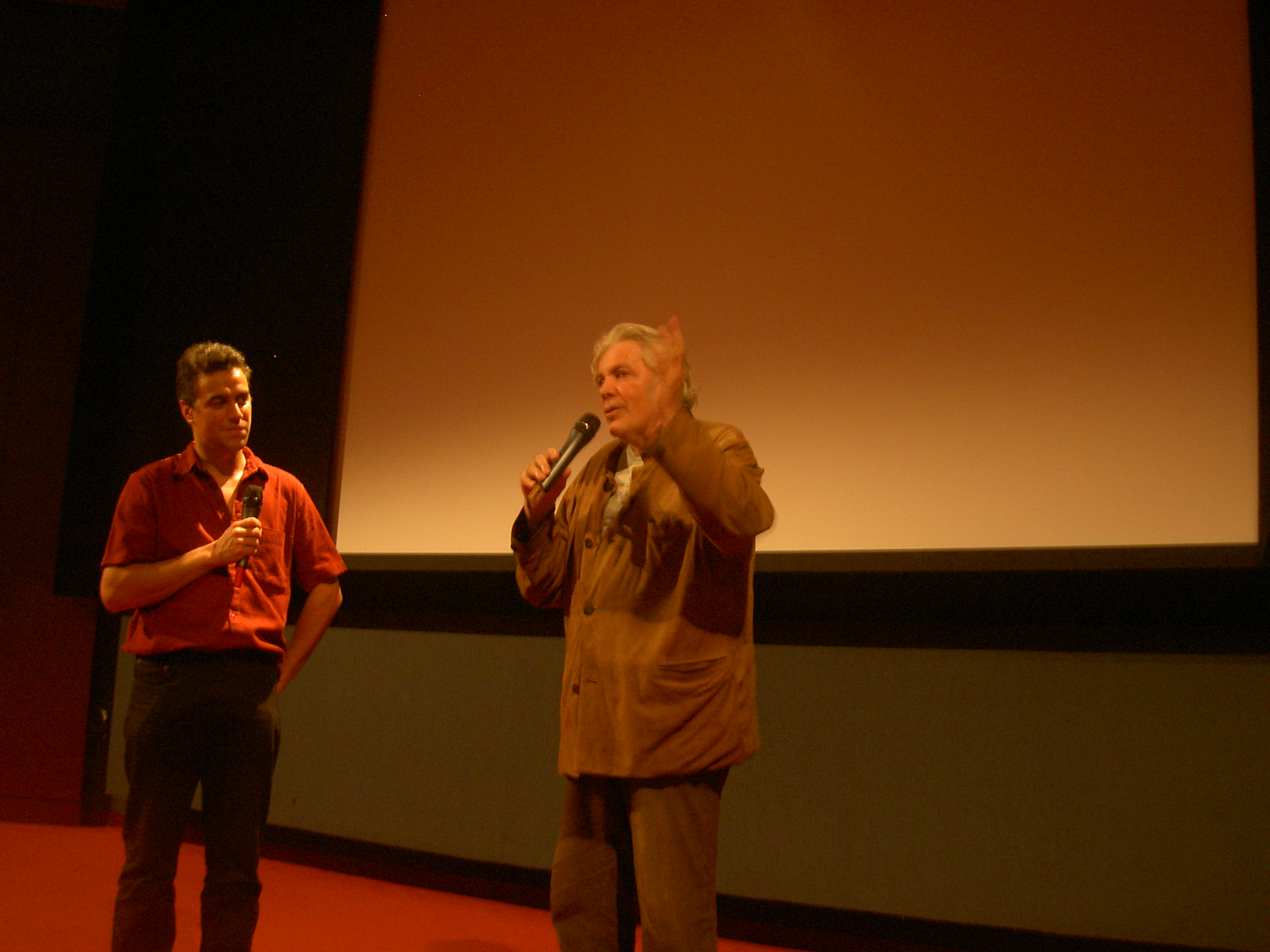
- Born: Élie Pierre Barouh; 19 February 1934; 15th arrondissement of Paris, France
- Died: 28 December 2016 (aged 82); 14th arrondissement of Paris, France
- Resting place: Montmartre Cemetery, 18th arrondissement of Paris
- Occupations: Singer-songwriter; musician; composer; actor; music producer
- Years active: 1961–2016
- Spouses: Anouk Aimée (m. 1966; div. 1969) Dominique (m. 1970; div. 1983) Atsuko Ushioda (m. 1983)
- Children: Benjamin Barouh; Maïa Barouh; Amie-Sarah Barouh; Akira Barouh
- Musical career
- Instrument: Vocals
- Years active: 1962–2016
- Labels: Palette; Disc'AZ; Saravah; Barclay

Pierre Barouh (born Élie Pierre Barouh; 19 February 1934 – 28 December 2016) was a French writer-composer-singer best known for his work on Claude Lelouch's film A Man and a Woman as an actor and the lyricist/singer for Francis Lai's music score.

== Early life and music ==
Barouh was born in Paris and along with his brother, Albert, and sister, was raised in Levallois-Perret. Their parents were Turkish-Jewish stallholders selling fabrics. During the Second World War, their parents hid them from the Nazis; Pierre and his sister in Montournais and Albert in la Limouzinière. During these years Élie, baptised Pierre, lived at La Grèlerie, the home of Hilaire and Marie Rocher, who had two sons. From this time, he drew inspiration for songs like "La Bicyclette", "Des ronds dans l'eau" and "Les Filles du dimanche".

After the war, he was briefly a sports journalist for Paris-Presse-Intransigeant and also played for the national volleyball B team in the 1950s. He spent some months in Portugal and discovered Brazilian music. He visited Brazil in 1959 and on his return to Paris came to know Brazilian writers and composers of bossa nova.

With his first earnings he bought the mill, la Morvient, by the river in Le Boupère in the Vendée where he had spent part of his childhood. There he established a recording studio and welcomed other artists, using it to advance the talent of others and creating his own label Saravah in 1965. With the label, he wished to mix musicians and styles, to multiply musical encounters. He worked with Pierre Akendengué, Areski Belkacem, Brigitte Fontaine, Nana Vasconcelos, Gérard Ansaloni, Jacques Higelin, Alfred Panou, Maurane, David McNeil, and Elis Regina.

Soon after the label's creation, Barouh realised that he was not an able manager and so entrusted his management to a teenage friend he had known from playing volleyball at the age of 15. However, in 1972, he discovered that this friend had stolen 1,500,000 francs by means which prevented Barouh from being able to get any of it back, as he "had given him everything: signatures, etc".

== Cinema and theatre ==
As an actor, he played the role of the gypsy leader in the film D'où viens-tu Johnny? and appeared in Lelouch's Une fille et des fusils. As writer/performer he had success with La Plage – immortalised by Marie Laforêt and the guitarist Claude Ciari – Tes dix-huit ans and Monsieur de Furstenberg. He shot a documentary on the beginnings of bossa nova with his longtime friend Baden Powell de Aquino.

In 1966, he participated in the film A Man and a Woman which won the Palme d'Or at the 1966 Cannes Film Festival. He married the actress Anouk Aimée the same year; they divorced three years later.

Barouh died in the Hôpital Cochin in Paris from an infarction on 28 December 2016, at the age of 82. He was buried a week later at Montmartre Cemetery.

== Discography ==
=== Studio albums ===
- Pierre Barouh (1966) (also released as Vivre) – FR #15
- Viking bank (1977)
- Le pollen (1982)
- Sierras (1984)
- Noël (1991)
- Itchi go Itchi e – Une rencontre, une occasion (1998)
- Daltonien (2007)

=== Live albums ===
- Dites 33 (Volume 2) (with Yasuaki Shimizu and the Moonriders) (2001) (concert at the Espace Pierre Cardin, Paris on 15 February 1983)

=== Soundtrack albums ===
- A Man and a Woman ("Un homme et une femme") (with Frances Lai and Nicole Croisille) (1967) – FR #15, NOR #4
- 13 jours en France (with Francis Lai and Nicole Croisille) (1969) – FR #4
- Ça va, ça vient (1971)
- Au Kabaret de la dernière chance (with Anita Vallejo, Oscar Castro and the Aleph Theatre troupe) (1992)

=== Compilation albums ===
- Saudade (Un Manque Habité) (2001)
- Les Années Disc'AZ – L'intégrale Des Chansons (2008)
- 60 ans de chansons à des titres Divers (parfois Dit Vert) sur l'humain et ce qui l'entoure (2012)

=== Production credits ===
==== Albums ====
- Brigitte Fontaine est... folle ! by Brigitte Fontaine (1968)
- Comme à la radio by Brigitte Fontaine, Areski Belkacem and the Art Ensemble of Chicago (1969)
- Higelin & Areski by Jacques Higelin and Areski Belkacem (1969)
- Chante Jean-Roger Caussimon by Jean-Roger Caussimon (1970)
- Un beau matin by Areski Belkacem (1971)
- Brigitte Fontaine by Brigitte Fontaine (1972)
- Moshi by Barney Wilen (1972)
- Chorus by Michel Roques (1972)
- David McNeil by David McNeil (1972)
- Je ne connais pas cet homme by Brigitte Fontaine and Areski Belkacem (1973)
- Jean-Roger Caussimon by Jean-Roger Caussimon (1973)
- Nandipo by Pierre Akendengué (1974)
- Nana, Nelson Angelo, Novelli by Naná Vasconcelos, Nelson Angelo and Novelli (1975)
- Growing Up by Chic Streetman (1975)
- Dreams by Steve Lacy (1975)
- J’ai déjà fait mon arche, j’attends les animaux by David McNeil (1975)
- Afrika Obota by Pierre Akendengué (1976)
- Jeunes Années by Jean-Philippe Goude and Olivier Colé (1976)
- Shakespeare Says by Champion Jack Dupree (1976)
- Schumann – Sonate Op.11 / Ravel – Miroirs by Håkon Austbø (1977)
- À l'amour comme à la guerre by Philippe Léotard (1990)
- Voce a Mano by Allain Leprest and Richard Galliano (1992)
- Sur les quais by Daniel Mille (1993)
- Mes plus grands succès by Fred Poulet (1995)
- De la Scarpe à la Seine by Françoise Kucheida (1995)
- Encore cédé by Fred Poulet (1996)
- La mémoire du vent by Bïa Krieger (1997)
- Le Bonheur by Brigitte Fontaine and Areski Belkacem (1997)
- En revenant du bal by Gérard Pierron (1997)
- Ces moments là by Aram Sédèfian (1997) (co-produced with Bertrand Mougin)
- Le Funambule by Daniel Mille (1997)
- Les heures tranquilles by Daniel Mille (1998)
- Cris de coeur by Françoise Kucheida (1998)
- Sources by Bïa Krieger (2000)
- Et s'il était deux fois by Eric Guilleton (2000)
- Improvisations by Étienne Brunet and Fred Van Hove (2001)
- Le Trio Camara by Le Trio Camara (2001) (co-produced with Yves Chamberland)

==== Non-album singles ====
- "Simple routine" by Joël Favreau (1969)
- "I Love the Queen" by Jacques Higelin (1971)
- "Nini" by Jacques Higelin (1971)
- "Jamai-ai-ai-ai-ai-ais" by Brigitte Fontaine (1972)
- " Un jour, un papillon" by Joël Favreau (1972)
- "La Transatlantique" by Dominique Barouh (1972)
- "Likwala" by Pierre Akendengué (1975)
- "Femmes parmi les femmes" by Françoise Hardy (1975)

== Filmography ==
Year	Title	Role	Notes
1961	Arrêtez les tambours	Pierrot	Also assistant director
1962	Operation Gold Ingot	René	French: En plein cirage
1963	D'où viens-tu Johnny?	Django	
1964	La Dérive	Pierre	
1964	The Troops of St. Tropez	Gypsy	Uncredited; French: Le Gendarme de Saint-Tropez
1964	Le cirque au village		
1965	Une fille et des fusils	Pierre	
1966	A Man and a Woman	Pierre Gauthier	French: Un homme et une femme
1966	The Grand Moments	Karl Martin	French: Les Grands Moments
1967	Arrastão	Geronimo	
1967	Live for Life	Boxing spectator	Uncredited; French: Vivre pour vivre
1970	La bergère en colère	Engaged groom	Short
1972	Ça va, ça vient	Man who gives Areski a lift	Uncredited; also director and producer
1972	Saravah	None	Documentary; director and composer
1976	The Castaways of Turtle Island	Discontent traveller	
1976	The Labyrinth ou L'album de famille	None	Documentary; director, producer and composer
1977	Another Man, Another Chance	Street singer	Uncredited; French: Un autre homme, une autre chance
1979	Le Divorcement	None	Director, producer, writer and composer
1982	Elle voit des nains partout !	Parish priest	
1990	There Were Days... and Moons	Animator	French: Il y a des jours... et des lunes
2005	Le courage d'aimer	Advert producer	
2006	La fille du dimanche	Friend of the father	Short
2010	Les marais criminels		(final film role)
