= Un beau matin =

Studio album by Areski Belkacem
- Released: 1970
- Studio: Studio Saravah\
- Genre: Chanson
- Label: Saravah
- Producer: Pierre Barouh

Areski Belkacem chronology
Comme à la radio (1970)	Un beau matin (1970)	Je ne connais pas cet homme (1973)

Un beau matin is the first solo album (and his third overall) by French experimental singer and composer Areski Belkacem, released in 1970 on the Saravah label. He would not release a new solo album until Le Triomphe de l'amour in 2010, instead collaborating with his lover and creative partner Brigitte Fontaine for the next few decades.

== Track listing ==
No.	Title	Length
1.	"Un beau matin"	2:26
2.	"Le Dragon"	2:30
3.	"Liberté"	1:59
4.	"Bali"	3:53
5.	"80 A"	4:10
6.	"Chanson pour sa mère"	2:35
7.	"Nous avons tant parlé"	2:31
8.	"80 A.B."	1:58
9.	"À chaque tournant"	1:34
10.	"Comme avant"	3:11
11.	"Le Brouillard"	3:27
