= 12 chansons d'avant le déluge =

Studio album by Brigitte Fontaine and Jacques Higelin
- Released: 1966
- Genre: Chanson
- Label: Productions Jacques Canetti
- Producer: Jacques Canetti

Brigitte Fontaine chronology
13 chansons décadentes et fantasmagoriques (1966)	12 chansons d'avant le déluge (1966)	Brigitte Fontaine est... folle ! (1968)

Jacques Higelin chronology
12 chansons d'avant le déluge (1966)	Higelin et Areski (1969)

12 chansons d'avant le déluge is the second album by experimental French singer Brigitte Fontaine, and the first by French rock singer Jacques Higelin, released in 1966 on the Productions Jacques Canetti label. It was their only real release on the label, they would go on to release a few more singles that would be collected on the 15 chansons d'avant le déluge, suite et fin album in 1976, before moving to the Saravah label.

The album was produced by Jacques Canetti.

== Track listing ==
No.	Title	Writer(s)	Length
1.	"Maman j'ai peur"	Brigitte Fontaine
2.	"L'Isabelle"	Jacques Higelin, Mac Ormor
3.	"C'est pas d'ma faute"	Fontaine
4.	"Priez pour Saint-Germain-des-Prés"	Mac Ormor
5.	"On est là pour ça"	Higelin, Fontaine
6.	"On n'est pas des chiens"	Fontaine
7.	"Quand j'improvise sur mon piano"	Higelin, Mac Ormor
8.	"La Grippe"	Higelin, Fontaine
9.	"Les dieux sont dingues"	Fontaine
10.	"À Django"	Higelin, Mac Ormor
11.	"Dévaste-moi"	Fontaine
12.	"Fleur de pavot"
