= Higelin et Areski =

Studio album by Jacques Higelin and Areski Belkacem
- Released: 1969
- Genre: Chanson
- Length: 37:12
- Label: Saravah

Jacques Higelin chronology
12 chansons d'avant le déluge (1966)	Higelin et Areski (1969)	Jacques "Crabouif" Higelin (1971)

Areski Belkacem chronology
Higelin et Areski (1969)	Comme à la radio (1970)

Higelin et Areski is the second album by French rock singer Jacques Higelin and Areski Belkacem. Higelin and Areski met in the army, where Higelin would later introduce Areski to Brigitte Fontaine, who would become his lover and creative partner. The songs on the album are mostly minimalistic and experimental.

== Track listing ==
Side A
No.	Title	Writer(s)	Length
1.	"L'Inutile"	Jacques Higelin	2:22
2.	"Signalétique"	Higelin-Areski Belkacem	0:56
3.	"13'40"5 10"	Higelin	1:12
4.	"Je veux des coupables"	Brigitte Fontaine-Higelin	13:34

Side B
No.	Title	Writer(s)	Length
5.	"L'Ours"	Higelin-Areski	1:07
6.	"Six pieds en l'air"	Higelin	5:11
7.	"J'aurais bien voulu"	Higelin	2:32
8.	"Chope la soupape"	Higelin	5:51
9.	"Remember"	Higelin-Areski	4:27
