= L'un n'empêche pas l'autre =

2011 album by Brigitte Fontaine

Studio album by Brigitte Fontaine
- Released: 23 May 2011
- Genre: chanson
- Length: 54:00
- Label: Polydor, Universal Music France
- Producer: Ivor Guest

Brigitte Fontaine chronology
| Prohibition (2009) | L'un n'empêche pas l'autre (2011) | J'ai l'honneur d'être (2013) |

L'un n'empêche pas l'autre is the eighteenth album by experimental French singer Brigitte Fontaine, released in 2011 on the Polydor/Universal label. Like Kékéland in 2001, it is mostly an album featuring duets. There are only four originals, the other songs are new recordings of rarities and older songs.

== Track listing ==
| No. | Title | Featured artist | Length |
|---|---|---|---|
| 1. | "Dancefloor" | Grace Jones |
| 2. | "Supermarket" | Arno |
| 3. | "Rue Saint Louis en l'Île" | Alain Souchon |
| 4. | "Hollywood" | Christophe |
| 5. | "Pipeau" | -M- |
| 6. | "Les Vergers" | Bertrand Cantat |
| 7. | "Gilles de la Tourette" |
| 8. | "Duel" | Jacques Higelin |
| 9. | "Caravane" | Grace Jones |
| 10. | "Inadaptée" | Arno |
| 11. | "Dressing" | Emmanuelle Seigner |
| 12. | "God's Nightmare" |
| 13. | "Le Grand-père" | Areski Belkacem |
