= Brigitte Fontaine (album) =

Studio album by Brigitte Fontaine
- Released: 1972
- Genre: Chanson, experimental music
- Label: Saravah
- Producer: Pierre Barouh

Brigitte Fontaine chronology
Comme à la radio (1970)	Brigitte Fontaine (1972)	Je ne connais pas cet homme (1973)

Brigitte Fontaine is the fifth album by experimental French singer Brigitte Fontaine, released in 1972 on the Saravah label.

== Track listing ==
No.	Title	Writer(s)	Length
1.	"Brigitte + Pour le patron (Hidden Track)"	Brigitte Fontaine - Olivier Bloch-Lainé
2.	"Moi aussi + Famille (Hidden Track)"	Fontaine - Areski Belkacem
3.	"L'Auberge"	Fontaine - Jean-Charles Capon
4.	"Premier juillet"	Fontaine
5.	"Le Dragon"	Fontaine - Areski
6.	"Vingt secondes"	Fontaine - Julie Dassin
7.	"Eros"	Fontaine - Areski
8.	"Une minute cinquante-cinq"	Fontaine - Dassin
9.	"Où vas-tu petit garçon"	Fontaine - Daniel Vallancien - Philippe Maté
10.	"Marcelle"	Fontaine - Dassin
11.	"Merry Go Round"	Fontaine - Vallancien

On the 2002 CD re-release, Merry Go Round was replaced by an alternate version of the track L'Éternel Retour from the 1979 album Les églantines sont peut-être formidables.
