= Rue Saint Louis en l'Île =

Studio album by Brigitte Fontaine
- Released: 24 August 2004
- Genre: chanson
- Label: Virgin
- Producer: Areski Belkacem, Gotan Project, String Machine, Dondieu Divin, Bobby Jocky

Brigitte Fontaine chronology
Kékéland (2001)	Rue Saint Louis en l'Île (2004)	Libido (2006)

Rue Saint Louis en l'Île is the fifteenth album by experimental French singer Brigitte Fontaine, released in 2004 on the Virgin Records label. It features a new version of Le Nougat from her French corazon album with Mustapha and Hakim Amokrane of French band Zebda, as well as a duet with Areski Belkacem, Le Voile à l'école. There's also a cover of Édith Piaf, L'Homme à la moto, which was present before on an hommage album to the singer, in the words of Fontaine, "just to show off".

== Track listing ==
No.	Title	Length
1.	"Betty Boop en août"	3:13
2.	"Sous 200 Watts"	2:31
3.	"Rue Saint Louis en l'Île (with Gotan Project)"	4:26
4.	"La Veuve Clicquot"	3:37
5.	"Fréhel"	3:47
6.	"Le Voile à l'école (with Areski Belkacem)"	2:31
7.	"Mado"	2:45
8.	"La Chanson de Simone"	3:21
9.	"Le Nougat (with Mouss et Hakim)"	3:31
10.	"Et cætera"	4:05
11.	"Éloge de l'hiver"	4:23
12.	"Le Grand Jamais"	4:05
13.	"Folie"	5:12
14.	"L'Homme à la moto"	2:12

== Charts ==
Chart	Peak position
France	18
Belgium	44
Switzerland	88
