= J'ai l'honneur d'être =

Studio album by Brigitte Fontaine
- Released: 16 September 2013
- Genre: chanson
- Label: Universal Music Group
- Producer: Areski Belkacem, Jean-Claude Vannier

Brigitte Fontaine chronology
| L'un n'empêche pas l'autre (2011) | J'ai l'honneur d'être (2013) |

J'ai l'honneur d'être is the nineteenth album by experimental French singer Brigitte Fontaine, released in 2013 on the Universal Music Group label. Areski Belkacem composed and arranged all songs except La Pythonisse and Les Crocs, which were composed and arranged by Jean-Claude Vannier.

== Track listing ==
| No. | Title | Length |
|---|---|---|
| 1. | "Crazy Horse" |
| 2. | "Au diable Dieu" |
| 3. | "Sur une mer gelée" |
| 4. | "Delta" |
| 5. | "Les Crocs" |
| 6. | "Amour poubelle" |
| 7. | "L'Île au cœur d'enfant" |
| 8. | "Dîner en ville" |
| 9. | "J'ai l'honneur d'être" |
| 10. | "La Pythonisse" |
| 11. | "Les hommes préfèrent les hommes" |
| 12. | "J'aime" |
| 13. | "Père" |
