= Le Bonheur (Brigitte Fontaine and Areski Belkacem album) =

Studio album by Brigitte Fontaine and Areski Belkacem
- Released: 1975
- Genre: Chanson
- Length: 36:48
- Label: Saravah

Brigitte Fontaine chronology
L'Incendie (1974)	Le Bonheur (1975)	15 chansons d'avant le déluge, suite et fin (1976)

Areski Belkacem chronology
L'Incendie (1974)	Le Bonheur (1975)	Vous et Nous (1977)

Le Bonheur is the eighth album by experimental French singer Brigitte Fontaine and the sixth by Areski Belkacem, released in 1975 on the Saravah label. It is their fourth collaborative album.

The album features some abstracts from plays and noises (like animal cries). The booklet claims that the album was recorded "during Winter 1975 in a theater, a kitchen, a barn and a studio."

== Track listing ==
No.	Title	Writer(s)	Length
1.	"La Citrouille"	Brigitte Fontaine - Areski Belkacem	4:09
2.	"Théâtre"	Fontaine - Belkacem	1:28
3.	"Les Étoiles et les Cochons"	Fontaine - Belkacem	2:42
4.	"Le Propriétaire"	Fontaine - Belkacem	3:05
5.	"Boudali"	Belkacem	2:06
6.	"Bobo"	Fontaine - Belkacem	2:04
7.	"Les Vergers"	Fontaine - Belkacem	3:56
8.	"Mephisto"	Fontaine - Belkacem	2:42
9.	"Y'a du lard"	Fontaine - Belkacem	3:18
10.	"Le Bonheur"	Fontaine - Belkacem	8:31
11.	"L'Oubliana"	Fontaine - Belkacem	2:47

== Personnel ==
=== Musicians ===
- Areski Belkacem: guitar, percussion, flute, vocals
- Brigitte Fontaine: vocals, toys, theater drum
- Djamel: percussions
- Les Amis de la Bête: background vocals (track 11)

=== Production ===
- Recording: Jean-Pierre Chambard
- Production: Pierre Barouh
- Photographs: Ned Burgess
