= 15 chansons d'avant le déluge, suite et fin =

Compilation album by Brigitte Fontaine and Jacques Higelin
- Released: 1976
- Genre: Chanson
- Label: Productions Jacques Canetti

Brigitte Fontaine chronology
| Le Bonheur (1975) | 15 chansons d'avant le déluge, suite et fin (1976) | Vous et Nous (1977) |

Jacques Higelin chronology
| Alertez les bébés ! (1976) | 15 chansons d'avant le déluge, suite et fin (1976) | No Man's Land (1978) |

15 chansons d'avant le déluge, suite et fin (French for "15 songs from before the flood, continued and ending") is a compilation by experimental French singer Brigitte Fontaine and French rock singer Jacques Higelin, released in 1976 on the Productions Jacques Canetti label.

It is an album of Boris Vian-penned songs recorded by Higelin and released on an EP in January 1966 and on an LP shared with Marie-José Casanova, also released in 1966. The nine Brigitte Fontaine songs come from her first album, 13 chansons décadentes et fantasmagoriques. Contrary to the first release co-billed to both artists, 1966's 12 chansons d'avant le déluge, none of the songs are duets. The Fontaine songs were only added to fill in because the Higelin songs were not enough to make an LP.

== Track listing ==
| No. | Title | Writer(s) | Length |
|---|---|---|---|
| 1. | "Dans mon lit" | Vian-Walter |
| 2. | "Quand tu n'es pas là" | Fontaine |
| 3. | "Le Train" | Fontaine |
| 4. | "Je rêve" | Vian-Higelin |
| 5. | "La Vache enragée" | Fontaine |
| 6. | "La Vie sur les bras" | Fontaine |
| 7. | "Huit jours en Italie" | Vian |
| 8. | "La Côtelette" | Fontaine |
| 9. | "La Java des chaussettes à clous" | Vian-Walter |
| 10. | "Hallucinante aventure" | Fontaine |
| 11. | "Le Sac" | Fontaine |
| 12. | "L'Année à l'envers" | Vian-Walter |
| 13. | "J'suis décadente" | Fontaine |
| 14. | "L'Âme slave" | Vian-Walter |
| 15. | "Le Mauvais Coton" | Fontaine |
