= Pour moi la vie va commencer =

1963 single by Johnny Hallyday

Single by Johnny Hallyday

from the album D'où viens-tu Johnny? (soundtrack)
- Language: French
- English title: For me life will begin
- Released: 31 October 1963
- Studio: Studio Europasonor, Paris
- Genre: Pop, rock
- Length: 2:11
- Label: Philips
- Songwriter(s): Jean-Jacques Debout
- Producer(s): Lee Hallyday

Johnny Hallyday singles chronology
"Ma guitare" (1963)	"Pour moi la vie va commencer" (1963)	"Excuse-moi partenaire" (1964)

"Pour moi la vie va commencer" ("For me life will begin") is a song by written by French singer-songwriter Jean-Jacques Debout and performed by French singer Johnny Hallyday. It was released in October 1963, coinciding with the release of the film "D'où viens-tu Johnny", starring Hallyday and fellow singer and future wife Sylvie Vartan, of which the song is featured on.

== Commercial performance ==
The song spent three consecutive weeks at no. 1 on the singles sales chart in France (from 28 December 1963 to 17 January 1964).

== Charts ==
Chart (1960)	Peak position
Belgium (Ultratop 50 Flanders)	16
Belgium (Ultratop 50 Wallonia)	1
France (singles sales)	1
Netherlands (Single Top 100)	16
