= Est... Folle =

Studio album by Brigitte Fontaine
- Released: 1968
- Recorded: Studio Davout
- Genre: Chanson
- Label: Saravah
- Producer: Pierre Barouh

Brigitte Fontaine chronology
12 chansons d'avant le déluge (1966)	Est... Folle (1968)	Comme à la radio (1969)

Est... Folle is the third album by experimental French singer Brigitte Fontaine, released in 1968 on the Saravah label. Fontaine herself considers this to be her first real album. Jean-Claude Vannier was responsible for the arrangements.

== Reception ==
The album received a 7.3 rating from Pitchfork, which described it as "playful and charming, even if it offers few hints at the curveballs ahead." AllMusic gave it a four and a half rating.

PopMatters assigned it a score of eight out of ten, remarking "Here, on the album’s final number, she just sounds enamoured by the whole process of simply singing."

Professional ratings
Review scores
Source	Rating
AllMusic	4.5/5 stars
Pitchfork	7.3/10
PopMatters	8/10 stars

== Track listing ==
No.	Title	Writer(s)	Length
1.	"Il pleut"	Brigitte Fontaine - Jean-Claude Vannier	2:32
2.	"Le Beau Cancer"	Fontaine - Olivier Bloch-Lainé	1:59
3.	"Il se passe des choses"	Fontaine - Bloch-Lainé	3:34
4.	"Une fois mais pas deux"	Fontaine - Bloch-Lainé	2:45
5.	"L'Homme objet"	Fontaine - Bloch-Lainé	1:30
6.	"Éternelle"	Fontaine - Alain Clavier	2:23
7.	"Blanche Neige"	Fontaine - Bloch-Lainé	3:30
8.	"Comme Rimbaud"	Fontaine - Bloch-Lainé	1:53
9.	"Dommage que tu sois mort"	Fontaine - Bloch-Lainé	2:25
10.	"Je suis inadaptée"	Fontaine - Vannier	2:41
11.	"Cet enfant que je t'avais fait"	Fontaine - Jacques Higelin	4:25
