= Je ne connais pas cet homme =

Studio album by Brigitte Fontaine and Areski Belkacem
- Released: 1973
- Genre: Chanson
- Label: Saravah

Brigitte Fontaine chronology
Brigitte Fontaine (1972)	Je ne connais pas cet homme (1973)	L'Incendie (1974)

Areski Belkacem chronology
Un beau matin (1970)	Je ne connais pas cet homme (1973)	L'Incendie (1974)

Je ne connais pas cet homme is the sixth album by experimental French singer Brigitte Fontaine and the fourth by Areski Belkacem, released in 1973 on the Saravah label. It is their second collaborative album, and the first of a string of albums co-credited to both artists.

== Track listing ==
No.	Title	Length
1.	"Depuis"	1:57
2.	"J'ai 26 ans, Madame"	1:13
3.	"La Fille du Curé"	2:04
4.	"Comment ça va"	1:42
5.	"Montparnasse"	1:18
6.	"La Recherche de l'Hiver"	3:44
7.	"Les Blanchisseuses"	1:09
8.	"C'est normal"	4:22
9.	"Dis-moi"	4:31
10.	"On n'est pas des arbres"	1:44
11.	"La Renarde et le Bélier touffu"	4:21
12.	"Je ne connais pas cet homme"	2:17
13.	"Nous ne pourrons plus dormir"	1:31
14.	"La Morvien"	2:37
15.	"Le Silence"	2:30
