= Une fille et des fusils =

1965 film

- Directed by: Claude Lelouch
- Written by: Claude Lelouch; Pierre Uytterhoeven
- Produced by: Claude Lelouch; Felix C. Ziffer
- Starring: Jean-Pierre Kalfon; Amidou
- Cinematography: Jean Collomb
- Edited by: Claude Barrois
- Music by: Pierre Vassiliu
- Distributed by: Les Films de la Pléiade
- Release date: 2 June 1965 (France)
- Running time: 104 minutes
- Country: France
- Language: French

Une fille et des fusils is a 1965 French film directed by Claude Lelouch. It is also known in the English-speaking world as The Decadent Influence or To Be a Crook.

== Plot ==
Four young people, tired of working life, decide that they can earn more money from crime than they can from work. The film follows their training at the first "crime school", as well as their following deeds.

== Cast ==
- Jean-Pierre Kalfon as Jean-Pierre
- Amidou as Amidou
- Pierre Barouh as Pierre
- Jacques Portet as Jacques
- Janine Magnan as Martine
- Yane Barry as the bistrokeeper
- Betty Beckers as the prostitute

== Background ==
- With the film becoming Lelouch's first commercial success, he attempted to destroy all copies and negatives of his previous films. Lelouche failed to find a distributor for his next film, Les grands moments, and he then destroyed that film as well.
- Lelouch recycled some ideas from for Une fille et des fusils film in his later works, such as the shooting of bottles in Le bon et les méchants and the economic catastrophes in L'aventure, c'est l'aventure.
