= Libido (Brigitte Fontaine album) =

Studio album by Brigitte Fontaine
- Released: 30 October 2006
- Genre: chanson
- Label: Polydor, Universal Music France
- Producer: Areski Belkacem, Dondieu Divin, Jean-Claude Vannier, -M-

Brigitte Fontaine chronology
Rue Saint Louis en l'Île (2004)	Libido (2006)	Prohibition (2009)

Libido is the sixteenth album by experimental French singer Brigitte Fontaine, released in 2006 on the Polydor label. It once again features a collaboration with -M- on the song Mister Mystère, which -M- also sang solo on his fourth album, to which it gave its title. Brigitte Fontaine, for the first time in more than thirty years, calls upon arranger Jean-Claude Vannier for some songs, Barbe à papa and Mendelssohn. The title of Château intérieur comes from a book by Teresa of Ávila, although Fontaine admitted she didn't read it.

== Track listing ==
No.	Title	Length
1.	"Château intérieur"
2.	"La Metro"
3.	"Cul béni"
4.	"Elvire"
5.	"La Nacre et le Porphyre"
6.	"Barbe à papa"
7.	"Mendelssohn"
8.	"Les Babas"
9.	"Ex-Paradis"
10.	"La Viande"
11.	"Mister Mystère (with -M-)"
12.	"Noces"

== Personnel ==
- Lyrics: Brigitte Fontaine
- Music: Areski Belkacem except 6, 7 composed by Jean-Claude Vannier, 11 composed by -M-.
- Direction: Areski Belkacem except 7 (Jean-Claude Vannier), 11 (-M-).
- Editions Allo Music/Labo M Edition & Jean-Claude Vannier éditions

== Charts ==
Chart	Peak position
France	59
