= Vous et Nous =

Studio album by Brigitte Fontaine and Areski Belkacem
- Released: 1977
- Label: Saravah
- Producer: Areski Belkacem, Antoine Duhamel

Brigitte Fontaine chronology
15 chansons d'avant le déluge, suite et fin (1976)	Vous et Nous (1977)	Les églantines sont peut-être formidables (1980)

Areski Belkacem chronology
Le Bonheur (1975)	Vous et Nous (1977)	Les églantines sont peut-être formidables (1980)

Vous et Nous is the ninth album by experimental pop French musician Brigitte Fontaine and the seventh by Areski Belkacem, released in 1977 on the Saravah label. Vous et Nous is an avant-garde double album mixing a variety of instruments and vocal styles. The album uses synthesizer and drum machine on some songs. Other, more acoustic, songs show the Algerian/African influence that Fontaine and Areski were known for. The album was not well understood upon release, but in later years was championed by musicians such as Jim O'Rourke and Stereolab.

== Track listing ==
No.	Title	Length
1.	"Vous et nous"	1:59
2.	"Patriarcat"	6:46
3.	"Mon enfance"	1:41
4.	"Vent d'automne"	1:45
5.	"Le Serveur du dôme"	0:49
6.	"Je suis venu te voir"	3:09
7.	"Rien que changer"	1:19
8.	"Le ciel est doux"	1:45
9.	"Les Épis"	2:04
10.	"Le Repas des dromadaires"	3:07
11.	"Vous et nous"	2:25
12.	"L'Amour parfait"	2:45
13.	"Un soleil"	2:35
14.	"Dans ma rue"	4:36
15.	"L'Orage est fini"	1:40
16.	"Gamme"	0:10
17.	"Le Brin d'herbe"	1:10
18.	"La Harpe jaune"	2:50
19.	"Je t'aimerai"	3:11
20.	"Diabolo"	2:18
21.	"Cher"	2:26
22.	"Ce n'est pas un ennemi"	2:14
23.	"Encaustique"	0:55
24.	"Petit sapin"	2:19
25.	"Mon lit"	1:02
26.	"Je t'aimerai"	2:52
27.	"La Déchirure"	1:29
28.	"Le Petit cheval bleu"	0:34
29.	"Personne"	1:58
30.	"Les Roses sont farouches"	1:25
31.	"Le Bouc"	2:10
32.	"Dessin"	0:39
33.	"Les Muzdus"	3:00
