= Ma guitare =

1963 single by Johnny Hallyday

Single by Johnny Hallyday

from the album D'où viens-tu Johnny? (soundtrack)
- Language: French
- English title: My guitar
- B-side: "À plein coeur" "Quitte-moi doucement"
- Released: 31 October 1963
- Length: 1:50
- Label: Philips
- Songwriter(s): Johnny Hallyday, Jil & Jan, Eddie Vartan

Johnny Hallyday singles chronology
| "Da dou ron ron" (1963) | "Ma guitare" (1963) | "Pour moi la vie va commencer" (1963) |

"Ma guitare" ("My guitar") is a song by French singer Johnny Hallyday from the 1963 film D'où viens-tu Johnny? It was also released on a double A-side single (with the song "À plein coeur" from the same movie on the other side).

== Composition and writing ==
The song was written by Johnny Hallyday, Jil & Jan, and Eddie Vartan (Hallyday's future brother-in-law).

== Commercial performance ==
In France the single (listed as "Ma guitare") spent four weeks at no. 1 on the singles sales chart (in October–November 1963).

In Wallonia (French-speaking Belgium) the single charted as a double A-side and also reached number one.

== Track listing ==
7" single "Ma guitare / À plein coeur" B 373.205 F (1963, France)

A. "Ma guitare" (1:50)
AA. "À plein coeur" (2:15)

7" single "Ma guitare / Quitte-moi doucement" Philips JF 328 009 (1963, Netherlands)

A. "Ma guitare" (1:50)
AA. "Quitte-moi doucement" (2:15)

== Charts ==
=== "Ma guitare" ===
| Chart (1963–1964) | Peak position |
|---|---|
| France (Singles Sales) | 1 |
| Belgium (Ultratop 50 Flanders) | 18 |
| Belgium (Ultratop 50 Wallonia) | 1 |

=== "À plein coeur" ===
| Chart (1963–1964) | Peak position |
|---|---|
| Belgium (Ultratop 50 Wallonia) | 1 |
