= Betty Beckers =

French actress (1925–1982)

Betty Beckers (3 May 1925, in Villeneuve-Saint-Georges – 21 December 1982) was a French actress.

== Filmography ==
Film
Year	Title	Role	Notes
1936	The Phantom Gondola	Belkis	
1952	Holiday for Henrietta	Une amie des scénaristes	Uncredited
1954	Crime au Concert Mayol		
1955	Napoléon	Une Merveilleuse	Uncredited
1956	Deadlier Than the Male	Une fille	
1956	Mitsou ou Comment l'esprit vient aux filles...		
1957	The Man in the Raincoat	La soprano	Uncredited
1957	Lovers of Paris		
1958	Cargaison blanche	L'actrice	Uncredited
1958	La p... sentimentale		
1959	The Female	Une danseuse	
1960	La Vérité		Uncredited
1960	Boulevard	Une danseuse	
1961	Samedi soir		
1962	The Devil and the Ten Commandments	Une amie de Mauricette	(deleted segment "L'oeuvre de chair ne désireras qu'en mariage seulement"), Uncredited
1962	Filles de fraudeurs	Josée	
1965	Une fille et des fusils	La prostituée	
1969	Delphine		
1970	The Things of Life	L'autostoppeuse	
1970	Last Leap	La préposée	
1971	Max et les Ferrailleurs	Maria	
1972	Le droit d'aimer		
1972	César and Rosalie	Madeleine	
1973	Hail the Artist	Une maquilleuse au bord de l'eau	
1974	Vincent, François, Paul and the Others	Myriam	
1974	Un linceul n'a pas de poches	Madame Carlille	
1976	Cours après moi... que je t'attrape		
1979	The Dogs	La femme parking	
1980	La nuit de la mort!	Hélène	
1981	Les bidasses aux grandes manoeuvres	Madame Desjument	(final film role)
