= Óscar Castro Ramírez =

Chilean actor (1947–2021)

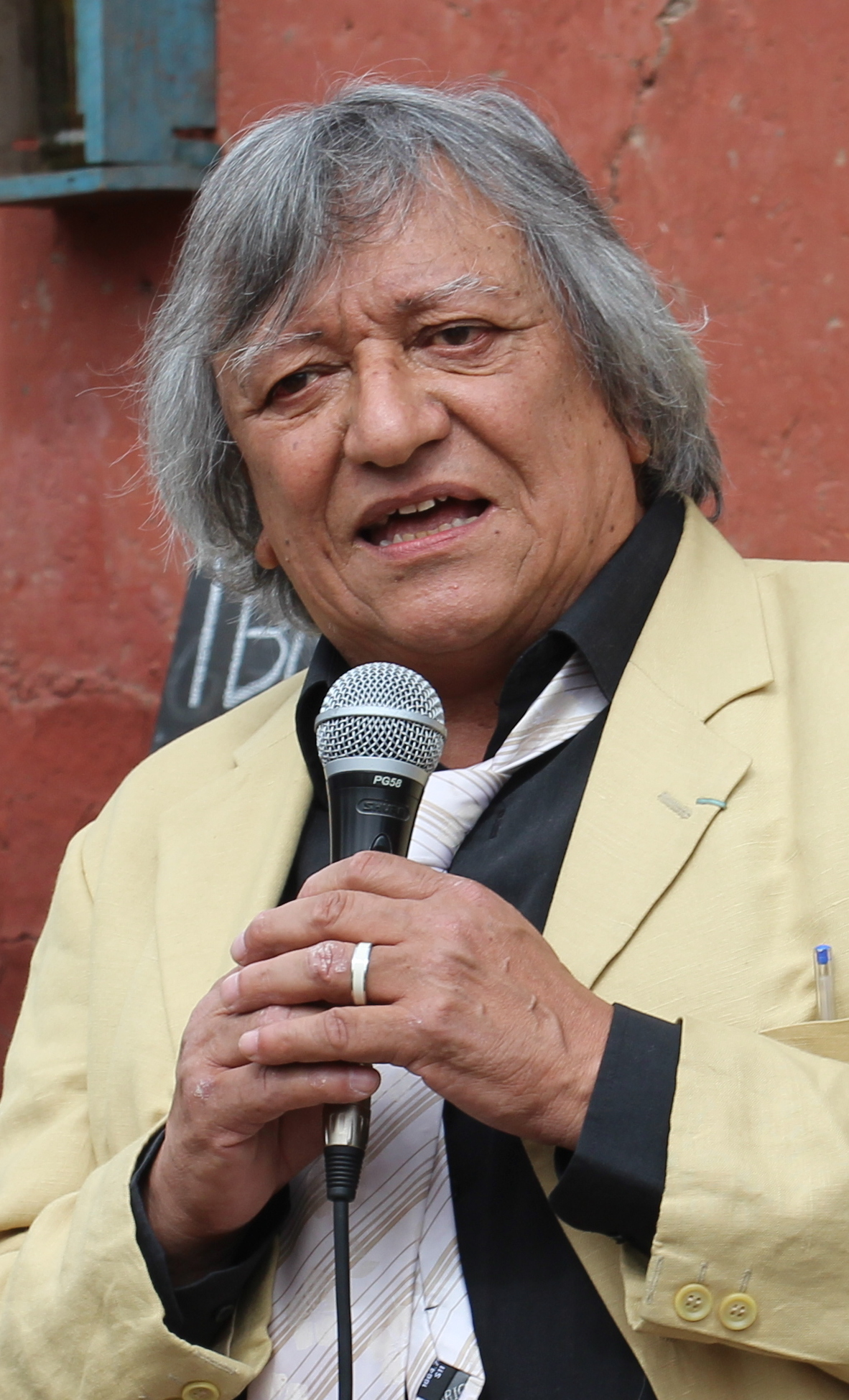
Óscar Castro Ramirez in 2016

Oscar Castro Ramírez, (13 May 1947 – 25 April 2021), was a Chilean playwright, actor and director of the Aleph Theater.

== Life ==
Óscar Castro founded the Aleph Theatre in Santiago in 1968 with fellow students. Self-taught and politically active, the Aleph wrote and staged a series of musical plays and produced satirical programmes for Chilean television. On tour in France at the time of the coup d’état in September 1973, the company presented La Trinchera del Supertricio (an allegory of the military coup ) in October 1974. As a result, several actors of the troupe were arrested, interrogated and tortured: two disappeared under interrogation and two others (Óscar Castro and his sister Marieta) were interned in concentration camps for two years. During his internment, Óscar created a new play each week for the «Viernes culturales» for his fellow inmates.

On his release in 1976, Óscar was exiled and sought asylum in France.
Since 1976, Óscar lived in Paris where he continued to create plays and write novels. The Aleph Theatre company, which he directed, is based in the Parisian suburb of Ivry sur Seine, where they have their own theatre space. Over the years, the Aleph Theatre company has become a myth and a reference for Latin-American theatre and Erase una vez un rey Once upon a time there was a king, written in 1971, has become today one of the most frequently performed plays throughout Central and Latin America.

He died from COVID-19 on 25 April 2021 at the age of 73 in Paris, France.

== Drama ==
=== Some dates ===
Óscar Castro has written, directed and performed in more than 30 Aleph creations, touring in France, Europe, Russia and North, Central and Latin America.

- 1982 Nominated member of the French PEN Club.
- 1983 Received the prize of the Best Script and Best Stage Direction for "La Nuit Suspendue" at Rencontres Charles Dullin, Villejuif (France).
- 1988 “On s’est tant aimé à Santiago”: documentary directed by Frédéric Laffont et Pierre Barouh about Óscar Castro's life and career, produced for French television (Résistances, Antenne 2).
- 1990 created the Théâtre des Gens et des Métiers (T.G.M). First festival in the Bataclan (Paris).
- 1992 Nominated Chevalier des Arts et des Lettres distinction awarded by Jack Lang, ministry of Culture of French President François Mitterrand.
- 1995 Creation of the Theatre Aleph in Ivry sur Seine: a theatrical space for creation, training and performance. Creation of his school - LATINACTOR.
- 2013 Óscar Castro creates Teatro Aleph in Santiago with young Chilean actors.
- 2017 Nominated Comendador del orden al mérito docente y cultura Gabriela Mistral distinction awarded by ministry of education of Chile.
- 2018 Nominated Chevalier de la légion d'honneur distinction awarded by Françoise Nyssen, ministry of Culture

=== Some peoples ===
Óscar Castro was surrounded by key figures with whom he collaborated:

- Gabriel García Márquez, organized Aleph tour of Mexico and Cuba (1981).
- Robert Doisneau, President of the Aleph Theatre (1990–1994).
- Pierre Barouh, co-author and actor (1985–1991).
- Pierre Richard, actor in the company (1996).
- Adel Hakim, director of T.Q.I.(C.D.N. d’Ivry-sur-Seine). Oscar Castro has written two plays directed by Adel Hakim and co-produced with Théâtre des Quartiers d’Ivry (TQI): "Le 11 septembre de Salvador Allende" (2003), and "La nébuleuse vie de José Miranda" (2009).
- 2007 Collaboration with WWF France for the creation and performance of the play "Hasta la vida siempre", a burlesque and poetic comedy on ecology and sustainable development.
- 2010 In partnership with the Foundation France Libertés (Danielle Mitterrand) and the Water Carriers Movement, Óscar Castro writes and directs "Les porteurs d’eau" with his teenage drama class and publishes an illustrated children's story on the importance of water for the future of humanity. This play is performed in schools as part of the campaign to protect water.
- 2010–2011, Óscar Castro organises theatrical conferences at the Aleph (Ivry) to which he invites famous personalities defending human rights and ecology such as Alain Touraine, Serge Orru, Carmen Castillo, Gilles Clément, Danielle Mitterrand.
- 2011–2012–2013, Óscar Castro organises theatrical conferences at the Aleph (Ivry) with the TESPO (Experimental theater of Sciences Po students, to which he invites professors of Sciences Po Paris such as Max-Jean Zins, Delphine Grouès, Dominique Boullier.
- 2011–2012, Óscar Castro organises theatrical conferences at the Aleph (Ivry) to which he invites professor of Philosophy Emmanuel Brassat.
- 2012- 2014, In the context of an educational project named FORCAST led by Dominique Boullier in SCIENCES PO and 12 educational partners, he joined as a pedagogical and artistic contributor in the numeric book course taught by Pierre Mounier.

And Hector Noguera, Noël Mamère, Claude Lelouch, Jacques Higelin, Thomas Gilou, Luis Sepúlveda, Antonio Skármeta, Ariel Dorfman, Frédéric Laffont.

== Publications ==
- La verdadera historia del Kabaret de la Última Esperanza (1997) Santiago, Chile: LOM, as a novel of the play "Le Kabaret de la Dernière Chance".
- La véritable histoire du Kabaret de la Dernière Chance (1999) - Novel - Paris: Éditions de l’Amandier.
- La plume du corbeau (2003) Paris: Éditions de l’Amandier. A collection of four plays written by Oscar Castro : L’Exilé Mateluna, Il était une fois un roi, Le Che que j’aime, Meutre à Valparaíso.
- Trilogie théâtrale : Le 11 septembre de Salvador Allende, Pablo Neruda, ainsi la poésie n’aura pas chanté en vain, Le Che que j’aime. (2004) Paris: Éditions de l’Amandier. Three plays on three significant Latin American figures of the 20th century.
- Hasta la vida siempre (2008) Paris: Éditions de l’Amandier. Text published in Spanish and French.
- Les porteurs d’eau (2011) Paris: Éditions de l’Amandier. An illustrated children's story (illustration : Marie-Hélène O'Neill), published with the support of Foundation France Libertés and the Mouvement des Porteus d’eau. Preface by Danielle Mitterrand and postface by Gilles Clément.
- Après l'oubli le souvenir (2011) - Novel - Paris: Éditions de l’Amandier

== Cinema ==
- Nowhere, by Luis Sepúlveda (2002)
- Fleur de canelle, by Frédéric Laffont (2000)
- Chili con carne, by Thomas Gilou (1999)
- Droit dans le mur, by Pierre Richard (1997)
- La cavale des fous, by Marco Pico (1995)
- On peut toujours rêver, by Pierre Richard (1993)
- Il y a des jours et des lunes, by Claude Lelouch (1990)
- On s’est tant aimé à Santiago, by Frédéric Laffont (1988)
- Burning Patience, by Antonio Skármeta (1983), Prix du Jury, Biarritz Film Festival (1984)

== Plays ==
- 2019 • La démocratie de la peur (play - Ivry France)
- 2018 • Au menu, amours de saison (play - Ivry France)
- 2017 • Le bal des poètes (play - Ivry France)
- 2016 • L'indien qui marche sur la mer (play - Ivry France)
- 2015 • La brume (play - Ivry France, Kolkata in India)
- 2014 • Adaptation and direction "Le mystère de la chambre jaune", play from Gaston Leroux
- 2013 • Mamie Chili (play - Ivry France)
- 2013 • Adaptation and direction "Fragments d'un discours numérique", play from Dominique Boullier
- 2012 • Sube sube la espumita (play: France,Chile)
- 2011 • OTNI – Objet théâtral non identifié (play - Ivry France)
- 2010 • Les Porteurs d’eau (play - Ivry, Corbarieu Festival France)
- 2009 • La Nébuleuse vie de José Miranda (play – Ivry France)
- 2008 • Le Bazar hindou (play - Ivry France)
- 2007 • Hasta la vida siempre ! (play - France, Belgium, Chile)
- 2005 • La Plume du corbeau (monologue - France, Chile)
- 2004 • Pablo Neruda, ainsi la poésie n’aura pas chanté en vain (play - France, Belgium, Chile)
- 2003 • Le 11 septembre de Salvador Allende (play - France, Belgium, Chile)
- 2001 • Comme si de rien n’était (play - France, Chili)
- 2000 • Le Criminel revient toujours sur le lieu du crime (play - France)
- 1998 • Le Che que j’aime (play - France)
- 1996 • Meurtre à Valparaíso (play - France, Belgium, Russia, Ukraine, Chile)
- 1995 • Le mambo de Monsieur Paul (play – France, Germany)
- 1994 • Le Club des Boléros (play - France, Chile)
- 1993 • Réellement chaud (play - France, Chile)
- 1992 • Christophe Colomb Superstar (play - France)
- 1991 • Malenke (play - France, Chile)
- 1989 • La Tralalaviata (play - France)
- 1987 • La Maison accepte l’échec (play - France, Chile)
- 1986 • Le Kabaret de la Dernière Chance (play - France, Chile, Japan)
- 1985 • Sauve qui peut l’amour Latin arrive (play - France)
- 1984 • Talca, Paris et Broadway (play - France)
- 1983 • Il était une fois un roi (play - France, Chile)
- 1982 • La Nuit Suspendue (prix du meilleur texte et de la meilleure mise en scène, Rencontres Charles Dullin de Villejuif, France)
- 1980 • L’Incroyable et Triste Histoire du Général Peñalosa et de l’Exilé Mateluna (play - France, Switzerland, Belgium, UK, the Netherlands, Sweden, New York Shakespeare Festival, Canada, Cuba, Mexico, Chile)
- 1976 • La Guerra (play - Chile)
- 1975 • Sálvense quien pueda, Casimiro Peñafleta Preso Político (monologue - Chile)
- 1974 • La Trinchera del Supertricio (play - Chile)
- 1972 • Vida, Pasión y Muerte de Casimiro Peñafleta (monologue - Chile, France)
- 1971 • Erase una vez un rey *(play - Chile, France, Belgium) - French title: - Il était une fois un roi - Et la démocratie bordel ! - One of the most popular plays performed in Central and Latin America.
- 1970 • Viva in mundo de Fanta Cia (play - Chile)
- 1968 • Se sirve usted un cocktel molotov (play - Chile)
