= Jean-Pierre Kalfon =

French actor and singer

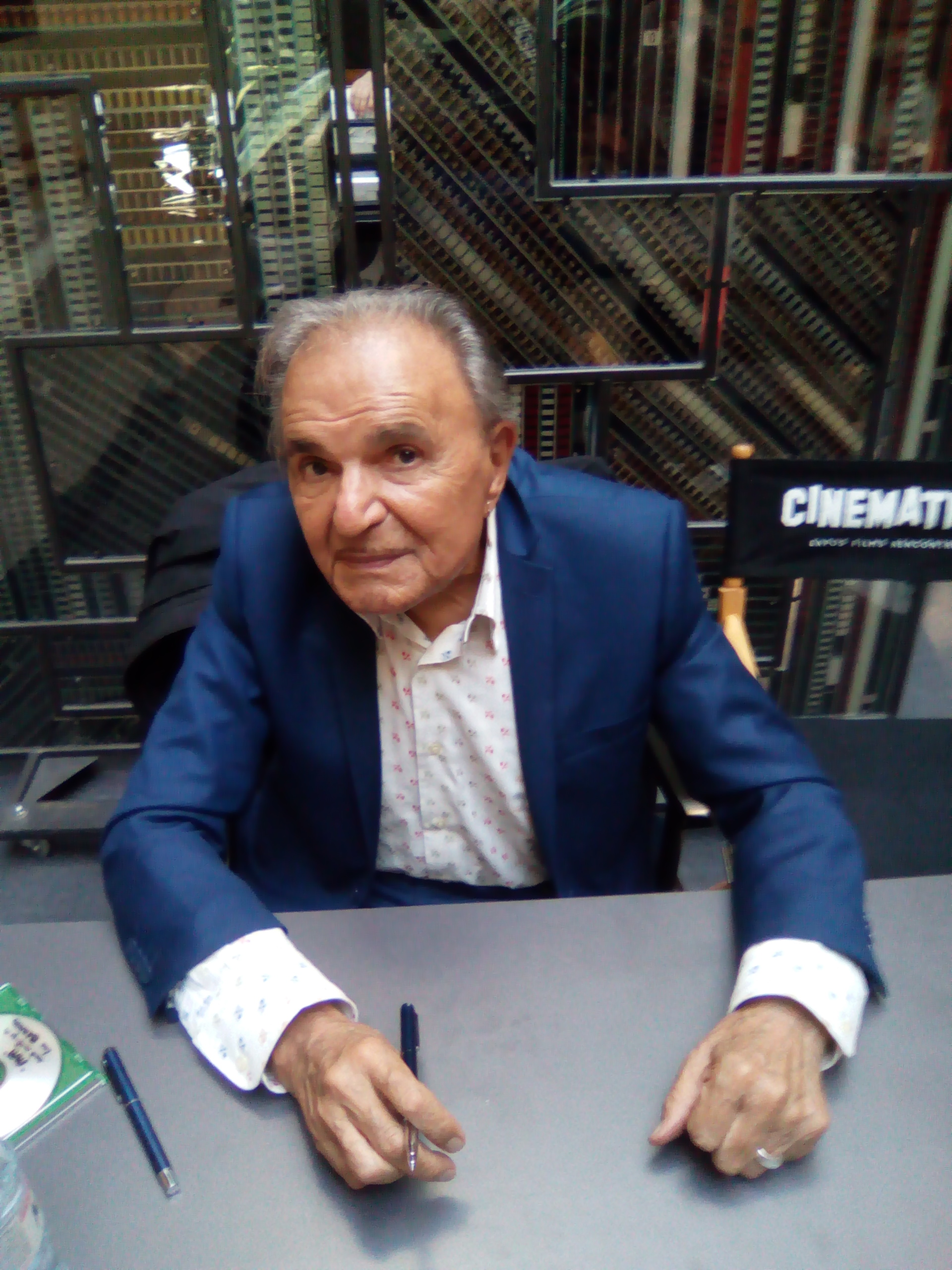
- Kalfon in 2019
- Born: 30 October 1938 (age 86); Paris, France
- Occupation(s): Actor, Singer
- Years active: 1959–present

Jean-Pierre Kalfon (born 30 October 1938) is a French actor and singer.

== Selected filmography ==
- Une fille et des fusils (1964)
- The Grand Moments (1965)
- Weekend (1967)
- Les Idoles (1968)
- Les Gauloises bleues (1968)
- L'amour fou (1969)
- La Vallée (1972)
- Zig Zag (1975)
- The Song of Roland (1977)
- The Apprentice Heel (1977)
- The Police War (1979)
- La Femme flic (1980)
- Condorman (1981)
- Hécate (1982)
- Liberty Belle (1983)
- Rue barbare (1983)
- Le jumeau (1984)
- L'amour par terre/Love on the Ground (1984)
- The Cry of the Owl (1987)
- Vent de Panique (1987)
- Corps Z'a Corps (1989)
- Et Demain Hollywood (1992)
- Dieu, L'Amant de Ma Mere, et le Fils du Charcutier (1995)
- A Hundred and One Nights (1995)
- Total Western (2000)
- Saint-Cyr (2000)
- La Repetition (2001)
- Lulu (2002)
- The Dreamers (2003)
- La Vie d'artiste (2007)
- I Always Wanted to Be a Gangster (2008)
- Parc (2008)
- The Rabbi's Cat (2011)
- This Summer Feeling (2015)
- Blind Willow, Sleeping Woman (2022)
