= Les églantines sont peut-être formidables =

Studio album by Brigitte Fontaine and Areski Belkacem
- Released: 1980
- Genres: French pop, Experimental
- Label: Saravah
- Producer: Mimi Lorenzini

Brigitte Fontaine chronology
Vous et Nous (1977)	Les églantines sont peut-être formidables (1980)	French corazon (1988)

Areski Belkacem chronology
Vous et Nous (1977)	Les églantines sont peut-être formidables (1980)	Le Triomphe de l'amour (2010)

Les églantines sont peut-être formidables is the tenth album by French experimental pop musician Brigitte Fontaine and the eighth by Areski Belkacem, released in 1980 on the Saravah label. Because of its arrangements, described as "on the edge of disco" by Fontaine herself, a sound that she can't stand, she has disowned the album and refused its re-release on CD, although it has been pressed in Japan in October 2008 by the Columbia Music Entertainment label. In 2025 a demo version was released as Baraka 80 with the same track listing.

== Track listing ==
- Lyrics: Brigitte Fontaine. Music: Areski Belkacem.

No.	Title	Length
1.	"Le Ménage"	4:50
2.	"L'Éternel Retour"	2:34
3.	"La Traversée"	3:06
4.	"Le Light Show"	2:01
5.	"La Vache"	2:45
6.	"Pif"	3:10
7.	"Tout le monde se rappelle peut-être de quoi il s'agit"	10:07
8.	"La Maison du café"	3:33
9.	"Baby boum-boum"	3:22

== Personnel ==
- Mimi Lorenzini: electric guitar, acoustic guitar
- Thierry Tamain: acoustic piano, Fender Rhodes electric piano, Hammond organ
- Anne Ballester: Fender Rhodes, synthesizers Oberheim and ARP Odyssey
- Frank Raholison: drums, percussion
- Emmanuel Binet: bass guitar
- Kakino Depaz: qanun
