= The Grand Moments =

1965 film

- Directed by: Claude Lelouch
- Written by: Claude Lelouch
- Produced by: Claude Lelouch; Pierre Uytterhoeven
- Starring: Janine Magnan; Jean-Pierre Kalfon; Pierre Barouh
- Cinematography: Jean Collomb
- Edited by: Claude Barrois
- Distributed by: Les Films 13; Les Films de la Pléiade
- Release date: 2 June 1965 (France)
- Running time: 85 minutes
- Country: France
- Language: French

The Grand Moments (French: Les Grands Moments) is a French film directed by Claude Lelouch in 1965.

== Details ==
- Title : The Grand Moments
- Director : Claude Lelouch
- Photography : Jean Collomb
- Producers : Films 13, Films de la Pléiade
- Scenery : Robert Luchaire
- Format : 2,35:1 (Franscope) - Mono - 35 mm
- Release date : 1965

== Starring ==
- Amidou : Roger Amy
- Pierre Barouh : Karl Martin
- Jean-Pierre Kalfon : Jean Mafitte
- Janine Magnan : Janine
- Jacques Portet : ''Jacques Framm''

== About the film ==
- After four attempts to destroy the negatives, Claude Lelouch eventually succeeded in 1964, within fifteen days of the success of Une fille et des fusils. Les Grands Moments was a parody of the James Bond style of the period, but the film never found a distributor, and Lelouch thought the film was so bad that he attempted to destroy the negatives of the film, so that it would never be shown. Lelouch then drove all night, stopping only in Deauville, where he saw a couple on a beach, who gave him the idea for a film, that went on to become A Man and a Woman.
- Janine Magnan was the partner of Lelouch at the time.
