= Le Triomphe de l'amour (album) =

Studio album by Areski Belkacem
- Released: 2010
- Genre: Chanson
- Label: Universal Music Group

Areski Belkacem chronology
Les églantines sont peut-être formidables (1980)	Le Triomphe de l'amour (2010)

Le Triomphe de l'amour is the second solo album by French experimental singer and composer Areski Belkacem (his ninth overall), released in 2010 on the Universal Music Group label. It is his first solo album in four decades, having instead collaborated with Brigitte Fontaine in the meantime.

== Track listing ==
No.	Title	Writer(s)	Length
1.	"Magicien Magicienne"	Areski Belkacem	3:56
2.	"L'Air de rien"	Areski	3:03
3.	"Les Fraises"	Areski	4:58
4.	"Le Rocker"	Areski	2:43
5.	"Salomé"	Brigitte Fontaine-Areski	4:04
6.	"La Seine"	Areski	3:22
7.	"Les Babouches"	Areski	3:22
8.	"Le Billet"	Areski	4:11
9.	"On n'a qu'à dire comme ça"	Areski	2:53
10.	"Ce soir-là"	Areski	3:01
11.	"Le Triomphe de l'amour"	Fontaine-Areski	3:26

== Personnel ==
- Areski Belkacem
- David Aubaile
- Patrick Baudin
- Nicolas Bauguil
- Frédéric Deville
- Dondieu Divin
- Zaza Fournier
- Hakim Hamadouche
- Bobby Jocky
- Jack Lahana
- Marcel Loeffler
- Didier Malherbe
- Yan Péchin
- Simon Pomarat
- Lucrèce Sanssella
- Vincent Segal
