= Comme à la radio =

Studio album by Brigitte Fontaine, Areski Belkacem and the Art Ensemble of Chicago
- Released: 15 November 1969
- Recorded: 1969
- Studio: Studio Saravah
- Genre: Chanson, chamber jazz
- Label: Saravah
- Producer: Pierre Barouh

Brigitte Fontaine chronology
| Brigitte Fontaine est... folle ! (1968) | Comme à la radio (1969) | Brigitte Fontaine (1972) |

Areski Belkacem chronology
| Higelin et Areski (1969) | Comme à la radio (1969) | Un beau matin (1970) |

Art Ensemble of Chicago chronology
| Eda Wobu (1969) | Comme à la radio (1969) | Certain Blacks (1970) |

Comme à la radio is the fourth album by experimental French singer Brigitte Fontaine, recorded with Areski Belkacem (in their first collaboration) and the Art Ensemble of Chicago. It was released in 1969 on the Saravah label after a series of concerts in 1969. It is Fontaine's most famous album, and is known outside of France on the 1990s alt-rock scene, thanks to laudatory comments from Beck Hansen and Sonic Youth among others.

The album received the Grand Prix du Disque of the Académie Charles Cros that same year. The single "Comme à la radio" has been covered by Japanese artist Jun Togawa in 2000.

== Track listing ==
| No. | Title | Length |
|---|---|---|
| 1. | "Comme à la radio" | 8:04 |
| 2. | "Tanka II" | 2:04 |
| 3. | "Le Brouillard" | 3:25 |
| 4. | "J'ai vingt-six ans" | 3:04 |
| 5. | "L'Été l'été" | 3:56 |
| 6. | "Encore" | 1:35 |
| 7. | "Léo" | 3:51 |
| 8. | "Les Petits Chevaux" | 0:43 |
| 9. | "Tanka I" | 1:46 |
| 10. | "Lettre à Monsieur le chef de gare de la Tour Carol" | 6:05 |

=== Bonus Tracks (CD reissues) ===
| No. | Title | Length |
|---|---|---|
| 11. | "Le Goudron" | 4:10 |
| 12. | "Le noir c'est mieux choisi" | 5:02 |
