= At Night All Cats Are Crazy =

1977 film by Gérard Zingg

- Directed by: Gérard Zingg
- Written by: Gérard Zingg; Philippe Dumarçay
- Produced by: Jean-Pierre Sammut
- Starring: Gérard Depardieu; Robert Stephens; Laura Betti
- Cinematography: Bruno Nuytten
- Edited by: Hélène Viard
- Music by: Jean-Claude Vannier
- Production companies: Sam Films; FR3
- Distributed by: SN Prodis
- Release date: 1977
- Running time: 124 min
- Country: France
- Language: French
- Box office: $388,410

At Night All Cats Are Crazy (French: La nuit, tous les chats sont gris, lit. At night all cats are grey) is a French film by Gérard Zingg released in 1977.

== Synopsis ==
Charles Watson tells Lily, his 10-year-old niece, a story about a character called Philibert, a bad boy. Lily wants to meet the latter and loses herself in a world where fiction and reality are mixed up. Her uncle believes as far as he's concerned, that he possesses literary gifts and loves living in the greatest of comforts.

== Cast ==
- Gérard Depardieu : Philippe Larcher
- Robert Stephens : Charles Watson
- Laura Betti : Jacqueline
- Tsilla Chelton : Madame Banalesco
- Charlotte Crow : Lily
- Albert Simono : Gaston, aka "Gastounet"
- Virginie Thévenet : Jeannette
- Dominique Laffin : The shop assistant
- Raoul Delfosse : The bald man
- Ann Zacharias : The white cat
- Gabriel Jabbour : Mr Banalesco
- Irina Grjebina : The withered beauty
- Lily Fayol : The joyful widow
- Jean Lemaître : M. Chatin
- Roger Muni : The barman
- Gérard Hernandez : The punter
- Julien Verdier : The man in his sixties
- Michel Pilorgé: Nanard
