= Prohibition (album) =

Studio album by Brigitte Fontaine
- Released: 5 October 2009
- Genre: chanson
- Length: 47:00
- Label: Polydor, Universal Music France
- Producer: Ivor Guest

Brigitte Fontaine chronology
| Libido (2006) | Prohibition (2009) | L'un n'empêche pas l'autre (2011) |

Prohibition is the seventeenth album by experimental French singer Brigitte Fontaine, released in 2009 on the Polydor label. The album features political content, as it is described by Fontaine as "a rebellious album", and the song Partir ou rester was written as a reaction to the 2007 French presidential election.

== Track listing ==
| No. | Title | Length |
|---|---|---|
| 1. | "Dura lex" |
| 2. | "Entre guillemets" |
| 3. | "La Fiancée de Frankenstein" |
| 4. | "Prohibition" |
| 5. | "Il s'en passe" |
| 6. | "Harem" |
| 7. | "Pas ce soir" |
| 8. | "Soufi" (with Grace Jones) |
| 9. | "Just You and Me" |
| 10. | "Partir ou rester" (with Philippe Katerine) |
| 11. | "Je suis un poète" |
| 12. | "Thérèse" (bonus downloadable track) |

== Personnel ==
- Lyrics: Brigitte Fontaine
- Music: Areski Belkacem
- Producer: Ivor Guest
- Seb Rochford - drums
- Tom Herbert - bass guitar
- Leo Abrahams, Leopold Ross - guitar
- David Coulter - multiple instruments
- Robert Logan - keyboards, cello

== Charts ==
| Chart | Peak position |
|---|---|
| France | 22 |
| Belgium | 90 |
