= Nicole Croisille =

French singer and actress (1936–2025)

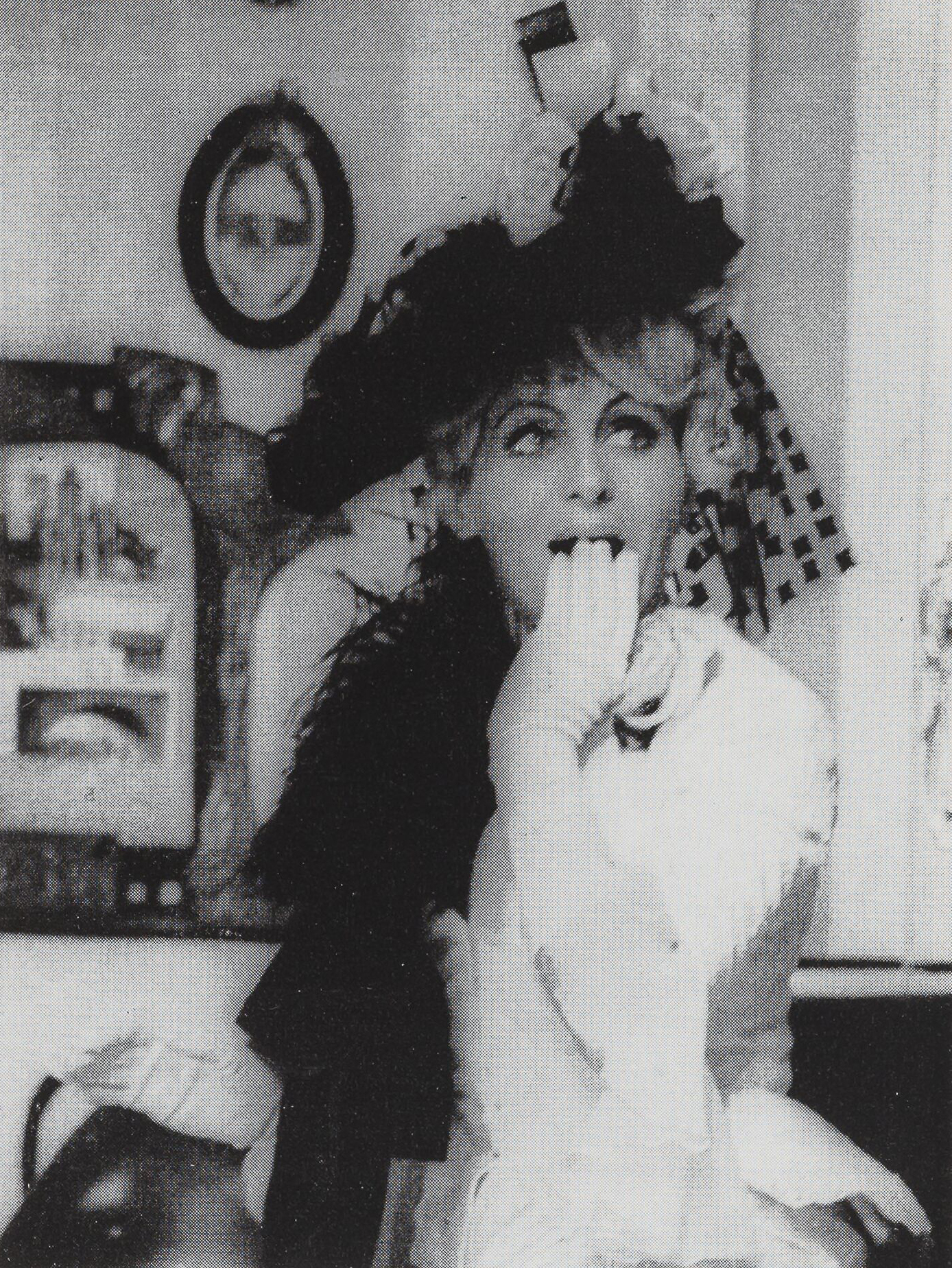
- Nicole Croisille c. 1970

Background information
- Born: 9 October 1936; Neuilly-sur-Seine, France
- Died: 4 June 2025 (aged 88); Saint-Cloud, France
- Genres: Chanson française

Nicole Croisille (9 October 1936 – 4 June 2025) was a French singer and actress. She appeared in 24 films between 1961 and 2005, and recorded several albums since 1961.

== Life and career ==
Croisille was born in Neuilly-sur-Seine, France on 9 October 1936.

Perhaps her most heard work is on the soundtrack of 1966 film by Claude Lelouch, A Man and a Woman (Un Homme et Une Femme). She sang one solo, "Today It's You," and dueted with Pierre Barouh on several other numbers.

Croisille attempted to represent France in the Eurovision Song Contest 1974 with the songs "Tu m'avais dit" and "Je t'aime un point c'est tout", but Dani was selected instead, although she did not participate due to Georges Pompidou's death being on the week in the contest. Her best-known records are "I'll Never Leave You"; "Téléphone-Moi"; "Une Femme avec Toi"; "J'ai besoin de Toi, J'ai besoin de Lui"; and "Parlez-moi de Lui".

Her single, "Woman in Your Arms", peaked at number 71 in Australia in May 1976.

Croisille lived with Ménière's disease. She died from liver cancer in Saint-Cloud, on 4 June 2025, at the age of 88.
