= Kékéland =

Studio album by Brigitte Fontaine
- Released: 20 August 2001
- Genre: chanson
- Length: 54:00
- Label: Virgin Records
- Producer: Areski Belkacem, Sonic Youth, -M-, Noir Désir

Brigitte Fontaine chronology
Les Palaces (1997)	Kékéland (2001)	Rue Saint Louis en l'Île (2004)

Kékéland is the fourteenth album by experimental French singer Brigitte Fontaine, released in 2001 on the Virgin Records label. It is almost entirely composed of collaborations. Fontaine exceptionally wrote two songs in English (Kékéland and God's Nightmare). Y'a des zazous is one of her rare covers, of French singer Andrex.

Because of the number of high-profile artists featured on the album, it had a better promotion and sold well, being certified gold record with more than 130,000 albums sold, a first for Fontaine.

== Track listing ==
No.	Title	Featured artist	Length
1.	"Demie clocharde"	Sonic Youth
2.	"Bis Baby boum boum"	Noir Désir
3.	"Pipeau"	-M-
4.	"Y'a des zazous"	-M-
5.	"Kékéland"	Sonic Youth
6.	"Je fume"	Loo & Placido
7.	"Je t'aime encore"
8.	"God's Nightmare"	Ginger Ale
9.	"Guadalquivir"	Areski Belkacem
10.	"Les Filles d'aujourd'hui"	Les Valentins
11.	"Rififi"	-M-
12.	"Profond"	Areski Belkacem
13.	"NRV"	Archie Shepp

== Charts ==
Chart (2001)	Peak position
Belgian Albums (Ultratop Wallonia)	49
French Albums (SNEP)	10
