= Bïa Krieger =

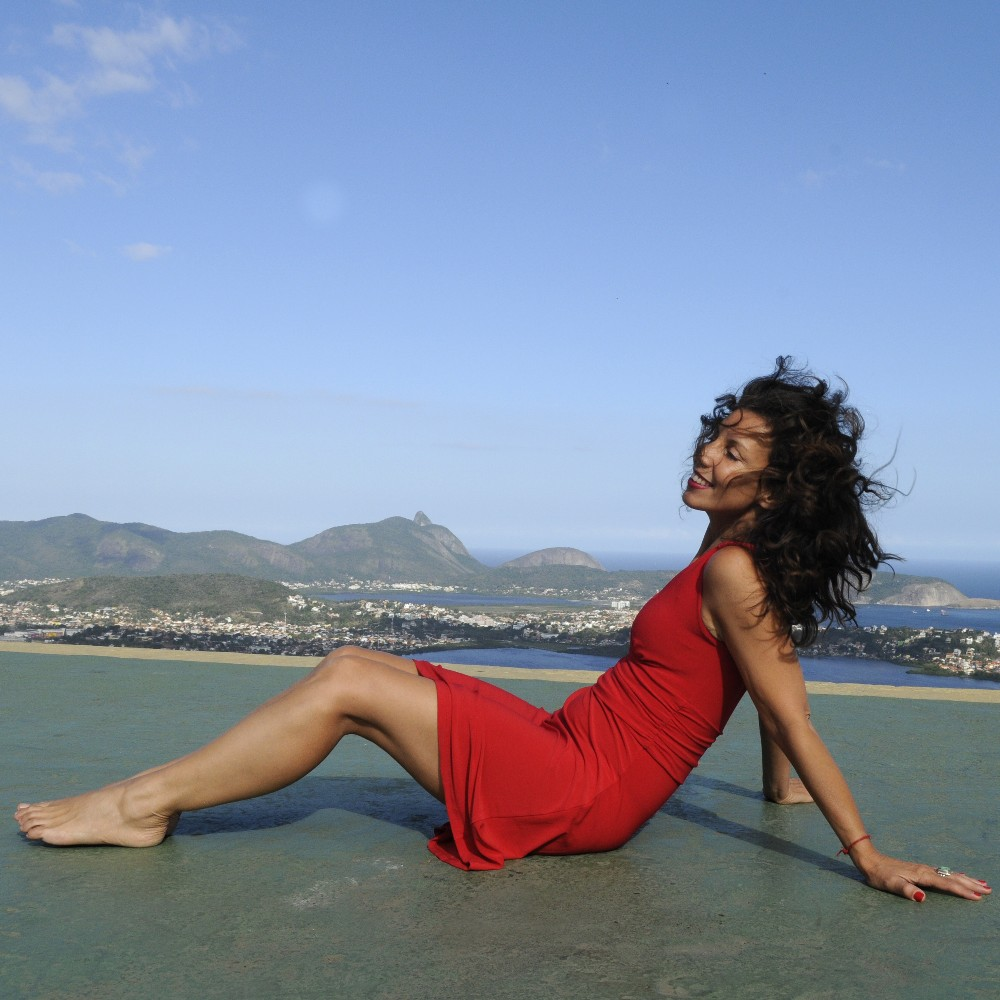

Background information
- Genres: World
- Occupations: Singer, songwriter
- Instrument: Vocals
- Years active: 1996–present
- Website: Bïa Krieger official website

Bïa Krieger, better known mononymously as Bïa, is a Brazilian-born singer and recording artist who lives in France and Quebec. She sings in French, Portuguese and Spanish. Her recording career began in 1996 and currently she has at least eight albums.

== Early years ==
During the years of the military dictatorship in Brazil, her parents were forced into exile. They moved the family to Chile, then Peru and finally Portugal. She was 12 when the family went back to their homeland after the Brazilian Amnesty Law.

While attending school Krieger was listening to music; Brazilian, Latin-American, English pop, as well as singing and playing guitar to her friends. She began a university degree in Journalism at São Paulo but quit and relocated to Europe, where she spent a few years sailing around the Atlantic and Mediterranean. In 1995, she decided to pursue music professionally.

== Professional career ==
In 1996, French author and producer Pierre Barouh offered Bïa an opportunity to record, after listening to her demo. This first album, La Mémoire du Vent; translations in French of some of the songs of the Brazilian songwriter Chico Buarque, earned the Grand Prix de l'Académie Charles Cros.

In 1998 she recorded the soundtrack for a Claude Lelouch film, and went touring in Japan, Italy and Canada.

She released her second album, Sources, in 2000. Partly recorded in Rio de Janeiro, this album was a return to her country's sources of inspiration. She also paid tribute to the Beatles, by covering Golden Slumbers.

In 2003, Krieger released her third album, Carmin. Most of the songs are hers, but she still paid homage to favourite songwriters; Chico Buarque, Gianmaria Testa and Henri Salvador. She also recorded an Inca mantra, Inti, a Pre-Columbian hymn to the sun. This album was partly recorded in Paris, partly in Montreal, where she spends much of her time.

Krieger sings in French as well as in her mother tongue Portuguese, and Spanish. She creates mixes between bossanova or samba rhythms and French language, pop flavours sung in South American style, and some very Brazilian or afro-Brazilian songs.

Her album Carmin has been produced by Robson Galdino, a carioca guitar player living in Paris, and Erik West Millette, a bass, guitar and slides player from Montreal.

Bïa played at the 2003 Montreal International Jazz Festival and was a 2007 Juno Award World Music nominee.

== Discography ==
- 2015 : Navegar
- 2014 : Chi.Coração
- 2011 : Concert Intime
- 2008 : Nocturno
- 2005 : Coeur vagabond
- 2003 : Carmin
- 2000 : Sources
- 1997 : La memoire du Vent

== Videos ==
- 2006 : Estrela Do Mar
