= L'Incendie =

Studio album by Brigitte Fontaine and Areski Belkacem
- Released: 1973
- Genre: Chanson
- Length: 30:00
- Label: Byg Records

Brigitte Fontaine and Areski Belkacem chronology
Je ne connais pas cet homme (1973)	L'Incendie (1973)	Le Bonheur (1975)

L'Incendie is the seventh album by experimental French singer Brigitte Fontaine and the fifth by Areski Belkacem, released in 1973 on the Byg Records label. It is their third collaborative album.

Le 6 septembre is a song about the Black September. Les Petites Madones is a song against capital punishment. Nous avons tant parlé is about an aspect of life as a couple.

L'Engourdie was written for Françoise Hardy, who never recorded it. L'Abeille is particular, as on this song, Areski wrote the lyrics and Fontaine the music, which is the contrary of their usual collaborative process.

== Track listing ==
No.	Title	Length
1.	"Le 6 Septembre"
2.	"Ragilia"
3.	"Il pleut sur la gare"
4.	"Déclaration de sinistre"
5.	"Les Murailles"
6.	"L'Engourdie"
7.	"Nous avons tant parlé"
8.	"Les Borgias"
9.	"Les Petites Madones"
10.	"L'Abeille"
11.	"Après la guerre"
12.	"La Tête bandée"
13.	"Le Chant des chants"
