= 13 chansons décadentes et fantasmagoriques =

Studio album by Brigitte Fontaine
- Released: 1966
- Recorded: March 1966
- Genre: Chanson
- Length: 44:40
- Label: Productions Jacques Canetti

Brigitte Fontaine chronology
13 chansons décadentes et fantasmagoriques (1966)	12 chansons d'avant le déluge (1966)

13 chansons décadentes et fantasmagoriques is the first album by experimental French singer Brigitte Fontaine, released in 1966 on the Productions Jacques Canetti label. Fontaine has disowned the album, which she states is merely a "draft" compared to her later works.

== Track listing ==
All songs by Brigitte Fontaine.

No.	Title	Length
1.	"Je suis décadente"
2.	"C'est pas de ma faute"
3.	"Hallucinante aventure"
4.	"Le Mauvais Coton"
5.	"Les dieux sont dingues"
6.	"Dévaste-moi"
7.	"La Côtelette"
8.	"Quand tu n'es pas là"
9.	"On n'est pas des chiens"
10.	"Le Train"
11.	"La Vie sur les bras"
12.	"La Vache enragée"
13.	"Le Sac"
