= Gérard Zingg =

French painter and film director (1942–2021)

- Born: 7 June 1942; Montfermeil, France
- Died: 27 July 2021 (aged 79); Gramat, France
- Occupations: Painter; Film director

Gérard Zingg (7 June 1942 – 27 July 2021) was a French painter, screenwriter, and film director.

== Biography ==
Zingg studied cinema at the Institut des hautes études cinématographiques. In 1977, he directed the film At Night All Cats Are Crazy, which starred Gérard Depardieu. He subsequently planned to direct the film L'Autobus de la haine, which was based on a comic strip by Fred, although it was never created. In 1998, he directed Ada dans la jungle, a Franco-Ivorian film based on a comic of the same name by Francesco Tullio Altan.

Along with his film career, Zingg dedicated himself to painting and exhibited his works in France and abroad. He also published several poetry collections.

Gérard Zingg died in Gramat on 27 July 2021 at the age of 79.

== Filmography ==
=== Director ===
- At Night All Cats Are Crazy (1977)
- Ada dans la jungle (1988)
- Yéti (2008)

=== Screenwriter ===
- Tendres Chasseurs (1969)
- At Night All Cats Are Crazy (1977)
- Alfred et Marie (1978)
- L'Année prochaine... si tout va bien (1981)
- Ada dans la jungle (1988)
- Lucifer et moi (2008)

=== Actor ===
- Young Tiger (2014)

=== Assistant director ===
- Going Places (1973)
- Pas si méchant que ça (1974)

== Publications ==
- Loup où es-tu (1999)
- Poèmes pour la conquête d'un vertige (2004)

== Expositions ==
- "Extravaganza" (Galerie Phantom Projects Contemporary, Marigny-le-Châtel, 2013–2014)
- "Small is beautiful 3" (Le Cabinet d'amateur, Paris, 2013)
