= Jean-Claude Vannier =

French composer, arranger, conductor

Jean-Claude Vannier (born 1943) is a French musician, composer and arranger. Vannier has composed music, written lyrics, and produced albums for many singers.

Vannier is regarded as an important musician in his native country; music critic Andy Votel noted his Eastern music influences and named him a pop-culture icon of 1970s France, alongside Serge Gainsbourg and Jane Birkin. He also was the conductor for Marie-France Dufour's song "Un train qui part" in the Eurovision Song Contest 1973.

== Early life ==
Vannier was born during a bomb scare in Courbevoie, Hauts-de-Seine. His parents "absolutely hated artists. There was absolutely no way I was going to pursue a career in music", until he turned 18 and had the right to do so. Self-taught, he began playing the piano at age 18, later arranging for Michel Magne and Alice Dona, his first notions of orchestration taken from the books of the "Que sais-je ?" collection.

== Career ==
Vannier collaborated on several film soundtracks including: Les Guichets du Louvre by Michel Mitrani, La Horse by Pierre Granier Deferre, Paris Nous Appartient by Robert Benayoun, Slogan by Pierre Grimblat, Projection Privée by François Leterrier, L'amour Propre by Martin Veyron, La Nuit Tous Les Chats Sont Gris by Gérard Zingg, and Comédie d'été by Daniel Vigne.

Besides his own concerts and diverse musical entertainments, Jean-Claude staged numerous shows for artists such as Véronique Sanson's show with the Prague Symphonic Orchestra at Paris' Châtelet Theatre, Jane Birkin at the Olympia, "Children's Opera", for which he also composed the music, and for the Festival of Avignon.

Jean-Claude Vannier has written and recorded six solo albums. Each release has been played live, at venues such as the Campagne Première Theatre, the Ranelagh Theatre, the Théâtre de la Ville, the Dejazet Theatre, the Trottoirs de Buenos Aires, the Auditorium des Halles, and the Théâtre des Abbesses.

"L'enfant assassin des mouches" is a concept album by Vannier that was released by Night & Day in 2003. This instrumental album, which inspired Serge Gainsbourg to write the well known cruel tale, was originally recorded in 1973. Finders Keepers, a UK record label, released it in 2005 with outstanding quotes from Jarvis Cocker, Jim O'Rourke, David Holmes, Tim Gane, Andy Votel International release in 2006 by Finders Keepers. "Because Music" republished the album in October 2008, and it since attained a more notable cult classic status.

Vannier performed an enormous live show L'enfant Assassin des Mouches & Melody Nelson at London's Barbican on 21 October 2006 with guest vocalists Jarvis Cocker, Badly Drawn Boy, Brigitte Fontaine, The Bad Seeds’ Mick Harvey and lead singer from Super Furry Animals, Gruff Rhys. The musicians used for the album were Dougie Wright, Big Jim Sullivan, Herbie Flowers and Vic Flick, who all joined Vannier for the concert. BBC Concert Orchestra, Crouch End Festival Chorus, a children's string quintet were part of the show

On 22 and 23 October 2008 this show, conceived, arranged and orchestrated by Jean-Claude Vannier, was performed at the Cité de la Musique with guest vocalists :Mathieu Amalric, B at the Cité de la Musique with guest vocalists Alain Chamfort, Mathieu Amalric, Brigitte Fontaine, Brian Molko (Placebo), Martina Topley Bird, Daniel Darc, Clotilde Hesme, Seaming To.

The Lamoureux Orchestra, the Yound Choir of Paris, and the children's string quintet were part of the show. The rhythm section was : bass : Herbie Flowers - guitars: Claude Engel and Thomas Coeuriot - drums: Pierre Alain Dahan - keyboards : Gérard Bikialo, and a sound effects man : Michel Musseau.

Vannier has also performed in other artistic fields such as watercolour paintings exhibited (Windsor and Newton Award 1984) at the Autumn Salon, journalism (writer for Nouvelles Littéraires, Glamour and the Journal Littéraire), the radio (comic gardening and cooking shows for France Culture) and directed a video for Maruschka Detmers.

In 1990 he also published his first collection of short stories, Le club des inconsolables ("The Club of the Inconsolable", published by Fixot).

In May 2019, he announced a new project with heavy metal vocalist Mike Patton, entitled Corpse Flower, with an album due in September that year.

== Discography ==
=== Solo albums ===
- 1972 : L'Enfant assassin des mouches (Insolitudes)
- 1974 : L'orchestre de Jean-Claude Vannier interprète les musiques de Georges Brassens
- 1975 : Jean-Claude Vannier
- 1976 : Des coups de poing dans la gueule
- 1980 : Pauvre muezzin
- 1981 : Jean-Claude Vannier
- 1985 : Public chéri je t'aime
- 1990 : Pleurez pas les filles
- 2005 : En public & Fait à la maison (2 CD)

=== Arrangements ===
- Barbara, album Madame
- Brigitte Fontaine, albums Brigitte Fontaine est... folle ! (1968), Libido (2006) and J'ai l'honneur d'être (2013)
- Alain Bashung
- Gilbert Bécaud, M. Winter
- Jane Birkin, albums Di doo dah, Versions Jane et Olympia
- Carlos
- Julien Clerc, album Terre De France
- Dalida
- Yves Duteil
- Enzo Enzo, album Oui
- Claude François
- Serge Gainsbourg, album Histoire de Melody Nelson
- France Gall
- Juliette Gréco (1971)
- Françoise Hardy
- Jacques Higelin
- Catherine Lara
- Carole Laure
- Michel Legrand, BOF Un Été 42
- Maurane
- Georges Moustaki
- Claude Nougaro
- Pascal Obispo
- Astor Piazzolla
- Michel Polnareff : On ira tous au paradis, Tous les bateaux, tous les oiseaux
- Elis Regina
- Régine
- Véronique Sanson
- Christine Sèvres en 1969 : Oscar et Irma, Comme Rimbaud, Maman j'ai peur...
- Mort Shuman
- Martial Solal

== Filmography ==
=== Feature films ===
- 1969 : Qu'est-ce qui fait courir les crocodiles ? by Jacques Poitrenaud
- 1969 : Paris n'existe pas by Robert Benayoun
- 1973 : Projection privée by François Leterrier
- 1974 : Les Guichets du Louvre by Michel Mitrani
- 1977 : La Nuit, tous les chats sont gris by Gérard Zingg
- 1985 : L'amour propre ne le reste jamais longtemps by Martin Veyron, compositeur et acteur (le pianiste)
- 1988 : Ada dans la jungle by Gérard Zingg
- 1989 : Comédie d'été by Daniel Vigne
- 1989 : Bienvenue à bord by Jean-Louis Leconte
- 1993 : Je m'appelle Victor by Guy Jacques
- 1995 : La Poudre aux yeux by Maurice Dugowson
- 2001 : La Tour Montparnasse infernale by Charles Nemes
- 2002 : Sauvage innocence by Philippe Garrel
- 2003 : Les Amants réguliers by Philippe Garrel
- 2004 : Aux Abois by Philippe Collin
- 2008 : Leur morale... et la nôtre by Florence Quentin
- 2015 : Microbe & Gasoline by Michel Gondry

=== Television ===
- 1994 : Personne ne m'aime, by René Dubois
- 1994 : Que le jour aille au diable, by Paul Vermus
- 1995 : La Belle by Fontenay, by Paule Zajderman
- 1998 : La Clé des champs, (6 episodes) by Charles Nemes
- 1998 : Les coquelicots sont, by Richard Bohringer
- 1999 : Dessine-moi un jouet, Hervé Baslé
- 2000 : Sa mère la pute, by Brigitte Roüan
- 2001 : Le Baptême du boiteux, by Philippe Venault
- 2002 : Le Champ Dolent, le roman by la Terre, d’Hervé Baslé
