= D'où viens-tu Johnny? =

1963 film by Noël Howard

D'où viens-tu Johnny ?
- Directed by: Noël Howard
- Written by: Yvan Audouard; Noël Howard; Christian Plume
- Produced by: Ray Ventura
- Starring: Johnny Hallyday; Sylvie Vartan
- Music by: Johnny Hallyday and Sylvie Vartan
- Production companies: Hoche Productions; Société Nouvelle de Cinématographie (SNC)
- Release date: 30 October 1963 (France)
- Country: France
- Language: French

D'où viens-tu Johnny ? ("Where Are You from, Johnny?") is a 1963 French film directed by Noël Howard, starring French rock and pop idols Johnny Hallyday and Sylvie Vartan, both of whom would later marry two years later.

== Plot ==
Johnny Rivière (Hallyday) is a young Parisian with a pure heart, passionate about rock and roll. The basement of a bar serves as a rehearsal room for him and his musicians, in exchange for small services that he provides to the boss, Mr. Franck. When he realizes that he is being manipulated by thugs, he revolts and throws a load of drugs into the Seine that he was responsible for transporting without his knowledge. Threatened with death, he takes refuge with his family in the Camargue, soon joined by his fiancée Gigi (Vartan) but also hunted down by the thugs who are after him. Hence fights, rides, love and songs… and the inevitable Happy ending.

== Songs ==
- "Ma guitare", etc.
