= French corazon =

Studio album by Brigitte Fontaine
- Released: 1988
- Genres: chanson, pop, rock
- Labels: EMI, Polydor
- Producers: Areski Belkacem, Jean-Philippe Rykiel

Brigitte Fontaine chronology
Les églantines sont peut-être formidables (1980)	French corazon (1988)	Genre humain (1995)

Alternative cover
- Cover of the Le Nougat release.

French corazon is the eleventh album by experimental French singer Brigitte Fontaine, released in 1988 on the EMI label. It was originally released in Japan only, but was finally released in France in 1990. It was also re-released under the title Le Nougat in 1999, after the most well-known song from the album, which was the closest Fontaine would ever have to a hit, and without the original title track.

The original album cover was a photograph by Peter Lindbergh. It has been replaced on the Le Nougat release by a drawing by Olivia Clavel, who had also directed the video clip for Le Nougat.

== Track listing ==
No.	Title	Length
1.	"French corazon"
2.	"La Cantatrice chauve"
3.	"Le Nougat"
4.	"Hollywood" (duet with Joëlle Garcenot)
5.	"Mauviette"
6.	"Leïla"
7.	"Welcome Pingouin" (duet with Areski Belkacem)
8.	"Dis"
9.	"In Nomine Matrice"
10.	"Les Carmens"
11.	"Plaisanterie classique"
12.	"Folie furieuse"
13.	"D'ailleurs" (duet with Areski Belkacem)

=== Bonus track on 1993 reissue ===
No.	Title	Length
14.	"D'ailleurs" (with Jacques Higelin and Areski Belkacem)
