= Jacques Canetti =

French music executive and talent agent

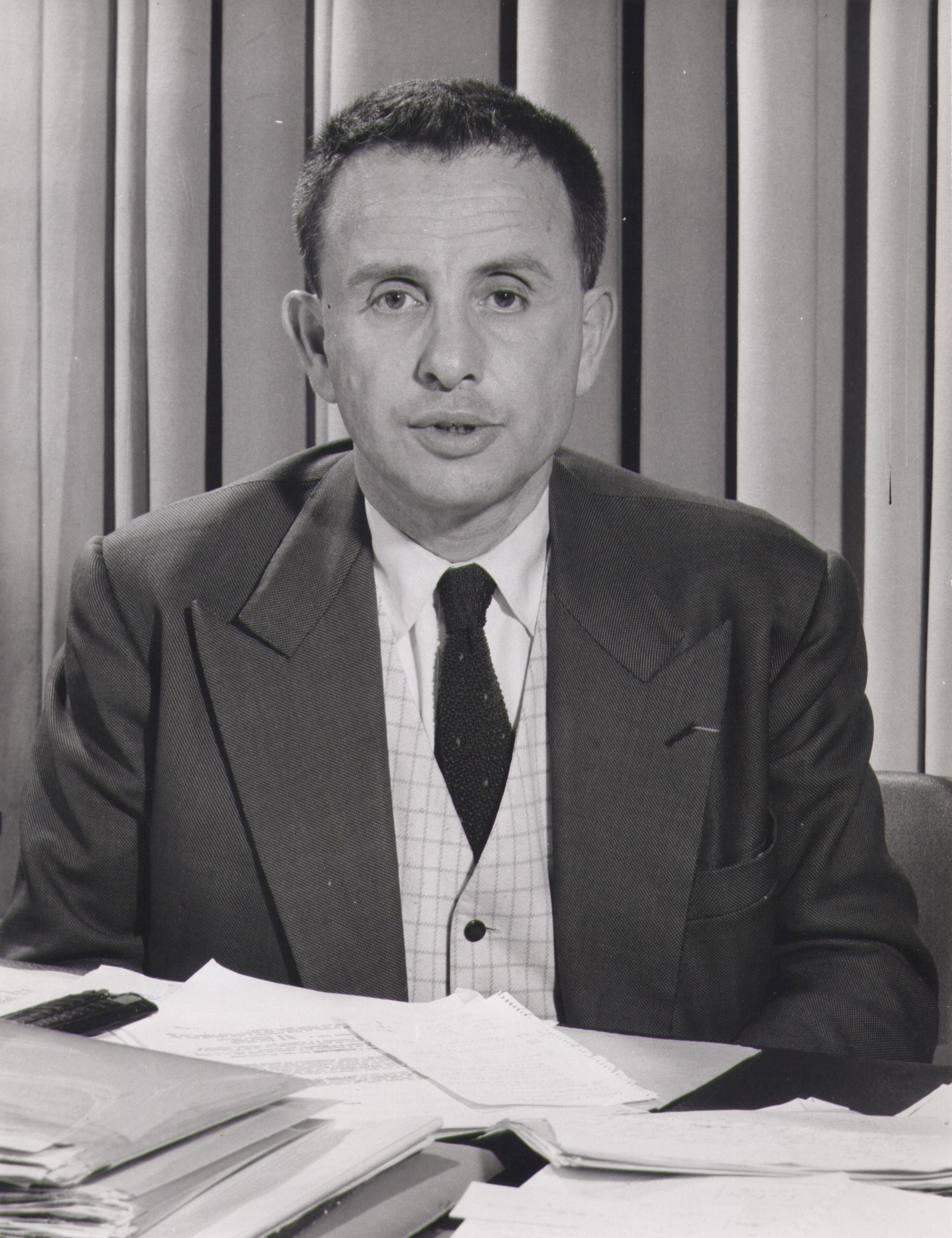
- Canetti in 1960
- Born: Nessim Jacques Canetti; 30 May 1909; Ruse, Bulgaria
- Died: 7 June 1997 (aged 88); Suresnes, Paris, France
- Education: HEC Paris
- Occupations: Music executive, talent agent
- Spouse: Lucienne Vernay (m. 1947)
- Children: 3
- Family: Elias Canetti (brother)

Nessim Jacques Canetti (30 May 1909, Ruse, Bulgaria – 7 June 1997, Suresnes) was a French music executive and a talent agent. Born into a Sephardic Jewish family, his parents were Jacques Elias (Elieser) and Mathilde (Mazal) (née Arditti) Canetti. He was the brother of the Nobel Prize-winning author Elias Canetti (1905–1994) and of Georges Canetti (1911–1971), a researcher and professor at the Pasteur Institute. Canetti studied at the École des Hautes Études Commerciales.

Canetti joined the Polydor record company in 1931. There, he persuaded Marlene Dietrich to record her first album of French songs, and also worked on recordings of classical music by the Galimir Quartet. He had developed a strong interest in jazz, and organised "Jazz Hot" tours of jazz artists to university towns, during the course of which he brought Louis Armstrong, Cab Calloway, and Duke Ellington to France. In 1936, he became artistic director of the programme "Le Music-hall des jeunes" at Radio-Cité, which began his long-term artistic involvement with French chanson.

During World War II, Canetti worked in Algiers for Radio-France Alger, and established a theatre with Françoise Rosay and Pierre Dac. After World War II, he became artistic director at Polydor, and in 1947, he opened the Théâtre des Trois Baudets in the Pigalle district in Paris. This venue hosted a great number of famous French performers, including Georges Brassens, Jacques Brel, Guy Béart, Serge Gainsbourg, Francis Lemarque, Félix Leclerc, and Juliette Gréco, and served as an artistic testing ground for potential recording artists of interest to Canetti. He built up in parallel a catalogue of chanson recordings for the Philips label, in addition to work for Polydor, and also the Fontana label.

In 1963, Canetti left Philips and founded his own production company, Les productions Jacques Canetti, and record label, Disques Canetti, which featured such artists as Jeanne Moreau, Jacques Higelin, Simone Signoret, Serge Reggiani, and Boris Vian. The Théâtre des Trois Baudets closed in 1967. In 1978, Canetti published his memoir, On cherche jeune homme aimant la musique, whose title derived from a job advertisement from Polydor which read "Cherche jeune homme aimant la musique et parlant couramment allemand" ("Seeking young man who loves music and speaks fluent German").

Canetti married Lucienne Vernay in 1947. The couple had three children, Colette, Françoise and Bernard.
