= Areski Belkacem =

French singer, musician and composer (1940–2026)

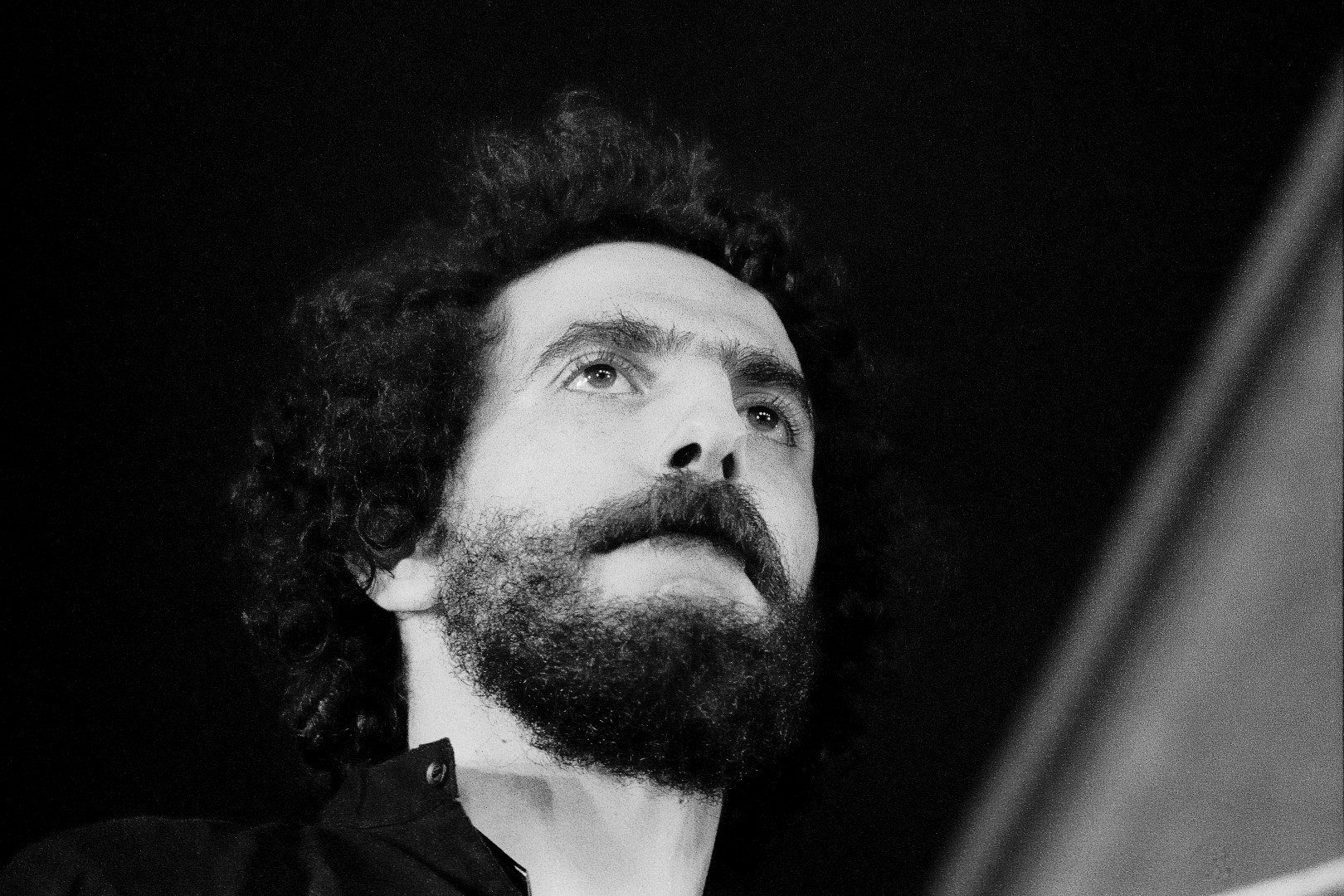
- Born: 23 January 1940; Versailles, France
- Died: 1 June 2026 (aged 86)
- Citizenship: French
- Occupations: Singer; composer
- Years active: 1968–2026
- Spouse: Brigitte Fontaine (1968–2026)
- Children: Ali Belkacem
- Musical career
- Genres: Avant-garde; experimental

Areski Belkacem (23 January 1940 – 1 June 2026), also known simply as Areski, was a French singer, multi-instrumentalist, comedian, and composer.

== Life and career ==
Areski Belkacem grew up in Versailles, where his parents, of Kabyle (Berber) descent, welcomed Algerian musicians: "at my house, post-war stars, old chaâbi veterans, were coming to play at my parents' home." As an adolescent, he watched rehearsals, for Olympia concerts, by Édith Piaf, The Beatles or Jacques Brel, in the great room of the Cyrano cinema. He began in dancing clubs, second-rate restaurants, and then went on to play at weddings, playing popular hits, and began performing on stage thanks to catholic sponsorship. Before his military service, during which he became friends with Jacques Higelin, he was playing in Saint-Germain-des-Prés caves as a drummer for jam sessions; after his military service, he started touring France as a multi-instrumentalist in various rock and jazz clubs.

Belkacem recorded an album with Higelin in 1969 and his voice is heard in the song Remember, of which he composed the music. Higelin introduced him to Brigitte Fontaine, and as early as 1969, they created Niok, a mostly improvised show which remained for months at the Lucernaire theatre in Paris. At the Théâtre du Vieux-Colombier, that same year, he played with Fontaine and the Art Ensemble of Chicago on the Comme à la radio album, which would go on to be an underground classic. He then recorded his first solo album in 1970, Un beau matin, and was the protagonist of the movie Ça va, ça vient, by Pierre Barouh, founder of the Saravah label. At the same time, he composed music for the director Peter Brook and also contributed to his shows as a comedian in the International Centre for Theatre Research.

His sentimental relationship with Brigitte Fontaine began after the album Brigitte Fontaine (1972), during the production of Je ne connais pas cet homme. In the 1970s, the shows of the duo Areski-Fontaine, often played in difficult conditions, mixed theatre and music, included much improvisation and few instruments or props, a unique mix of Areski's music (who also wrote some lyrics) with African and European traditional influences, and the lyrics of Fontaine. They shared lead singing on several albums (Je ne connais pas cet homme, L'Incendie, Le Bonheur, Vous et Nous, Les églantines sont peut-être formidables) produced under various situations, sometimes with little resources, exploring new ground, including some in which they are precursors (spoken poetry on Comme à la radio, electronics on Vous et Nous). Their influences range from Renaissance music to psychedelia with lyrics tackling legends, social commentary and biography.

The 1980s were a more difficult period, which saw the creation of Acte 2, a Brigitte Fontaine show which he performed with her. The album French corazon and the low-profile hit Le Nougat helped both of them to come back in 1992. Since then, Areski is still Brigitte Fontaine's main composer and sometimes sings duets with her on her albums, performs background vocals and does the arrangements. His work has evolved toward more contemporaneous sounds but still includes more classical influences.

Named "Prince consort of French chanson" by Camille Couteau in the newspaper Le Saule in January 2011 or compared to Berlioz by Éric Loret ("If Gainsbourg was Chopin", Libération, May 2010), Areski has also collaborated with Barbara, Georges Moustaki or Sapho. With her, he contributed to the Voix de la Méditerranée festival in Lodève. He also worked with Jean-Claude Vannier and Jean-Efflam Bavouzet, Antoine Duhamel, Sonic Youth, Richard Galliano, Christophe and Grace Jones. He is considered one of the most prestigious French composers. Both Comme à la radio and Les Palaces received the Académie Charles Cros award.

In parallel to his activities in chanson, Areski has also made soundtracks with his son Ali Belkacem for films (notably Jeunesse dorée in 2001 and À mort la mort by Romain Goupil in 1999) and theatre (Une liaison transatlantique). In 2004, he went studying at the Schola Cantorum de Paris to learn more about classical music. With Zep and Benoît Mouchart, he created in 2005 the music for an innovative show, the Concert de dessins which is now featured every year at the Angoulême International Comics Festival and allows the creation in music on big screen of an original comic.

On 26 October 2010, he published his second solo album, Le Triomphe de l'amour. The next year, he sang a duet with Zaza Fournier at the Olympia. In 2012, he played with Benoît Poelvoorde and Albert Dupontel in Le Grand Soir. In May 2013, he contributed to the show Il n'y a plus rien mais on est là by Mounia Raoui alongside Ali Belkacem and Bobby Jocky at the Gérard Philipe theatre.

== Death ==
Belkacem died on 1 June 2026, at the age of 86.

== Discography ==
=== Albums with Jacques Higelin ===
- Higelin et Areski (Saravah, 1969)

=== Albums with Brigitte Fontaine ===
- Comme à la radio (with the Art Ensemble of Chicago, Saravah, 1970)
- Je ne connais pas cet homme (Saravah, 1973)
- L'Incendie (Byg Records, 1974)
- Le Bonheur (Saravah, 1975)
- Vous et Nous (Saravah, 1977)
- Les églantines sont peut-être formidables (RCA/Saravah, 1980)

=== Solo albums ===
- Un beau matin (Saravah, 1970)
- Le Triomphe de l'amour (Universal Music Classic & Jazz, 2010)

=== Singles ===
- Quand tous les ghettos brûleront, ça va faire un hit (with Brigitte Fontaine, Byg Records, 1974)

== Filmography ==
- Ça va, ça vient by Pierre Barouh, 1970
- Le Grand Soir by Benoît Delépine and Gustave Kervern, 2011
