= Saravah =

French jazz record label

- Founded: 1965
- Founder: Pierre Barouh
- Genre: Jazz, bossa nova, samba, folk rock
- Country of origin: France
- Official website: www.saravah.fr

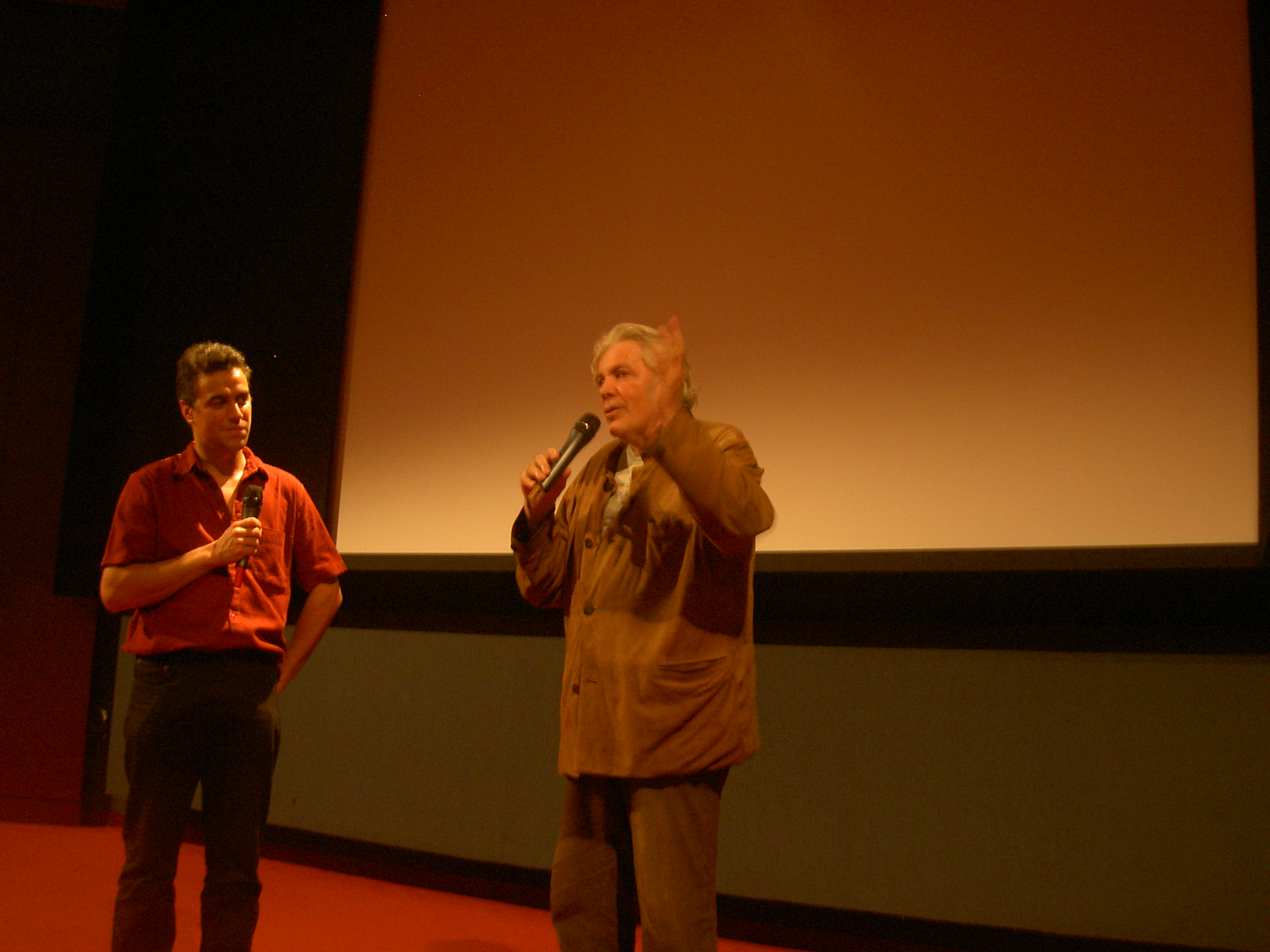
Pierre Barouh lecturing in Paris, 2005, photo: Alex de Carvalho

Saravah is a French jazz record label founded by singer-songwriter Pierre Barouh in 1965.

Saravah released the album 50 Years to celebrate its anniversary in the music business. The album included Albin de la Simone, Bastien Lallemant, Bertrand Belin, Camélia Jordana, François Morel, Jeanne Cherhal, Kahimi Karie, Maïa Barouh, Nana Vasconcelos, Olivia Ruiz, Ringo Sheena, Séverin, and Yolande Moreau.

Saravah owns and operates a concert hall in Shibuya, Tokyo. Opened in 2011, Saravah Tokyo (サラヴァ東京) is a "cultural meeting place where you can enjoy music without borders."

== Roster ==
Artists who have released albums on Saravah include

- A Filetta
- Areski Belkacem
- Art Ensemble of Chicago
- Barney Wilen
- Bïa Krieger
- Brigitte Fontaine
- Georges Arvanitas
- Jacques Higelin
- Jean-Roger Caussimon
- Maurane
- Michel Graillier
- Pierre Akendengué
- Pierre Barouh
- Pierre Louki
- René Urtreger
- Steve Lacy
- Thollem McDonas

== See also ==
- List of record labels
