= Brigitte Fontaine =

French singer (born 1939)

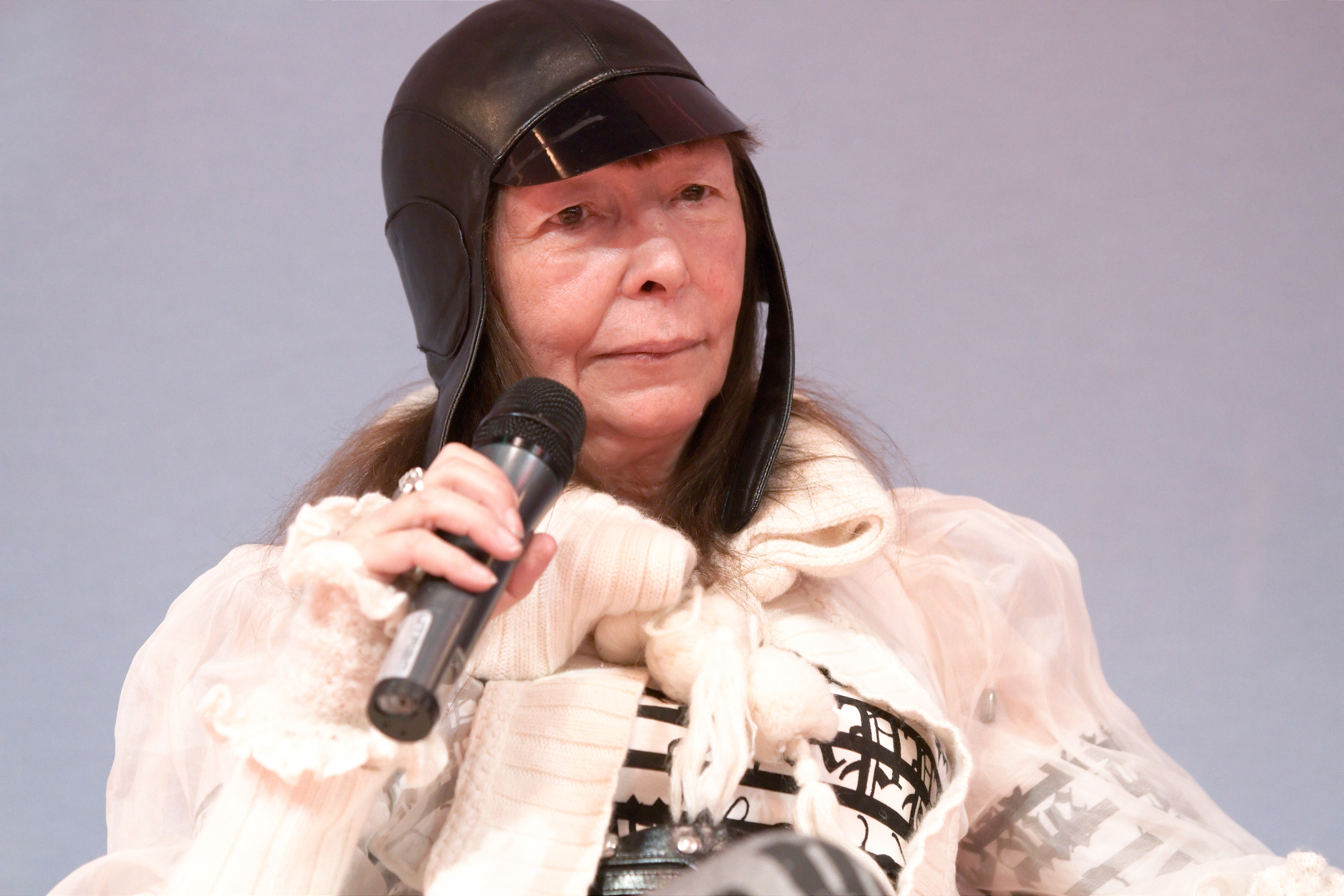
- Fontaine in 2010

Background information
- Born: 24 June 1939 (age 87); Morlaix, France
- Genres: Pop, rock, French pop, avant-garde, experimental
- Occupation: Singer-songwriter
- Instrument: Vocals

Brigitte Fontaine (French: [bʁiʒit fɔ̃tɛn]; born 24 June 1939) is a French singer of avant-garde music. She has employed numerous unusual musical styles, melding rock and roll, folk, jazz, electronica, spoken word poetry, and world. She has collaborated with Stereolab, Michel Colombier, Jean-Claude Vannier, Areski Belkacem, Gotan Project, Sonic Youth, Antoine Duhamel, Grace Jones, Noir Désir, Archie Shepp, Arno, and The Art Ensemble of Chicago. She is also a novelist, playwright, poet, and actress.

== Early life ==
The daughter of two teachers, Brigitte Fontaine developed her taste for writing and drama very early. She spent her childhood in small villages of Finistère, then in Morlaix. At 17 years old, she moved to Paris to become an actress.

In 1971, she was one of the women who signed the Manifesto of the 343, publicly admitting to having an abortion at a time when it was illegal in France.

== Artistic overview ==
=== 1963–1968 ===
In 1963, Fontaine turned to singing and appeared in several Parisian theatres, interpreting her own works. In 1964, she opened for Barbara and George Brassens's show at the Bobino. Even so, she did not give up theatre. With Jacques Higelin and actor Rufus, she created the play Maman j'ai peur ("Mom I am afraid"), which played first at the Vieille-Grille theatre, and then at the Théâtre des Champs-Élysées. It met with such a critical and popular success that it stayed in Paris for more than two seasons and toured throughout Europe.

In 1965 and then in 1968, she made two albums, one jazz and one avant-pop, as well as two 45s with Jacques Higelin. In 1969, she began what would be a long collaboration with Kabyle musician Areski Belkacem. With Belkacem and in the company of Higelin, she conceived Niok, an innovative spectacle of theatre and song, for the Lucernaire theatre. Soon after, Fontaine wrote a series of works in free verse and prose which comprised the show Comme à la radio at the Théâtre du Vieux-Colombier before being turned into an album of the same name. Recorded with the Art Ensemble of Chicago, this album marks a clean break with traditional French songs, building the first bridges to world music.

=== 1969–1979 ===
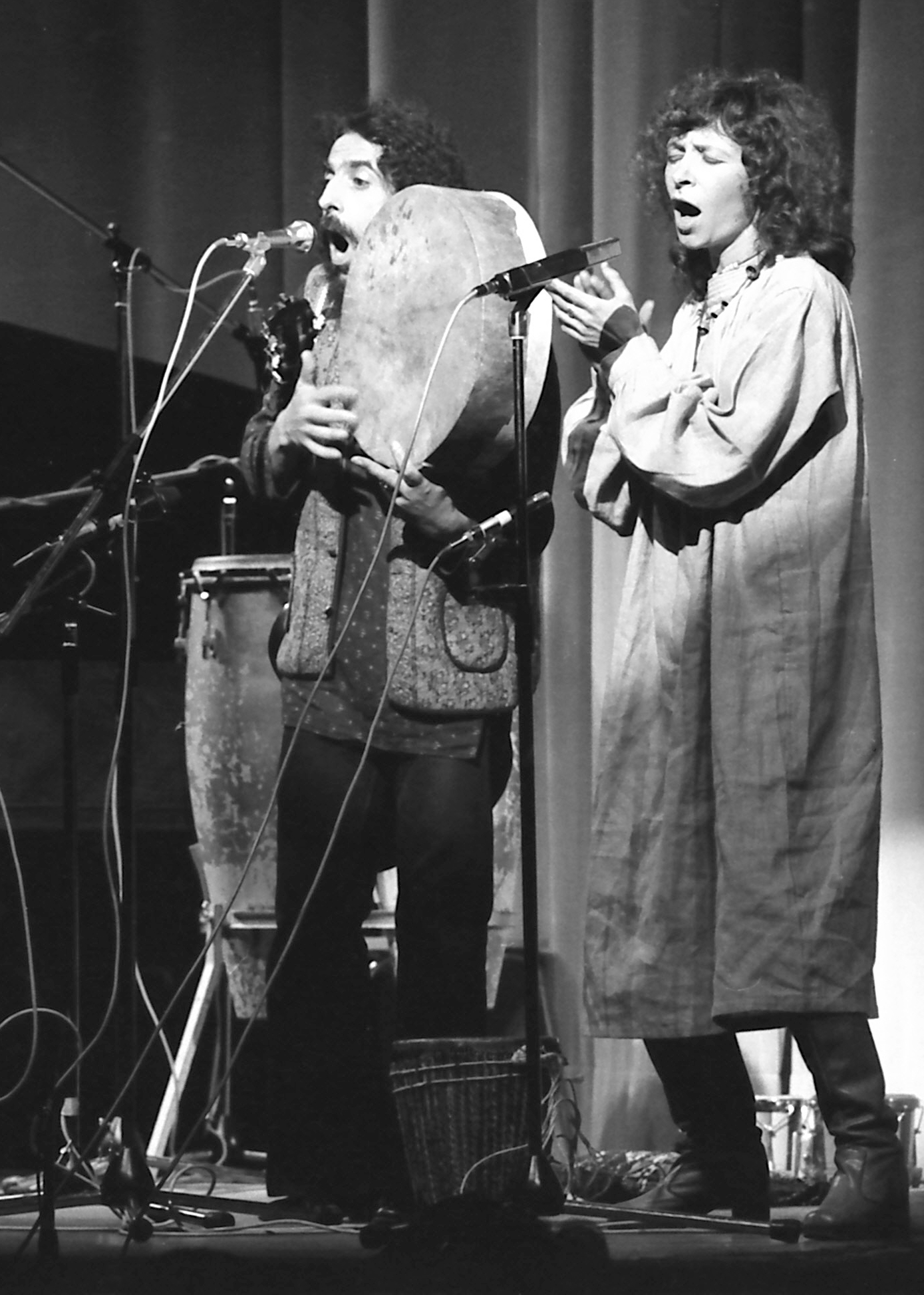
Fontaine and Areski Belkacem perform together in 1974

Fontaine became a major figure in the French underground. In a half-dozen albums, the majority of which were released through the independent label Saravah, Fontaine explored different poetic worlds. She renounced the use of rhyme, and using talk-over sometimes, she recorded, with very little means and often on two tracks, songs which addressed topics with humour or gravity, according to the mood, as various as death ("Dommage que tu sois mort"), life ("L’été, l’été"), alienation ("Comme à la radio"), madness ("Ragilia"), love ("Je t’aimerai"), social injustice ("C’est normal"), the inequality of the sexes ("Patriarcat") and racism ("Y'a du lard"). However, she also knew how to make light of herself ("L'Auberge (Révolution)").

Because they sail among pop, folk, electro and world music, the albums L'Incendie and Vous et Nous by the Areski-Fontaine duo figure among the most unclassifiable records of the French scene. Almost thirty years later, the international audience of these LPs (since re-edited for CD) is comparable to that of the cult record Histoire de Melody Nelson by Serge Gainsbourg and Jean-Claude Vannier, notably due to the enthusiastic remarks made by members of the band Sonic Youth in the English-speaking press.

=== 1980–1990 ===
The 1980s were a period of silence, musically speaking, for Fontaine and her partner Areski Belkacem. Far from the recording studio, she devoted herself to writing and the theatre. Always active, she appeared onstage in Quebec, she performed her play Acte 2 in a grand tour of the French-speaking world, interpreted Les Bonnes by Jean Genet in Paris, and published a novel (Paso doble) as well as a collection of short stories (Nouvelles de l’exil). In 1984, she recorded a single ("Les Filles d’aujourd’hui").

After having given a series of concerts in Tokyo and other large Japanese cities, she had to wait about five years for a French company to distribute her new album French corazon (written and composed in 1984 but released in 1988 in Japan). Having been broadcast notably on French television, the video for the single "Le Nougat", directed by comics artist Olivia Tele Clavel, prepared the public for the big return of the singer to the French stage which commenced with a concert in 1993 at the Bataclan.

=== 1990–2001 ===
In the 1990s, Fontaine moved closer to the musical worlds of Björk and Massive Attack by testing new, more electric musical forms and, especially, more electronic forms than before. Her lyrics mark a return to a more classical, versified form. The release of her album Genre humain, in 1995, met with great success (more so on the part of the critics than the general public) with surprising titles like "Conne" (produced by Étienne Daho), lyric titles like "La Femme à barbe" (produced by Les Valentins), and poetic ones like "Il se mêle à tout ça" (produced by Yann Cortella and Areski Belkacem).

In 1997, while she published a new novel (La Limonade bleue), she recorded Les Palaces and its landmark track "Ah que la vie est belle!". The album, very well received by the press, is enriched by the collaboration of Areski Belkacem, Jacques Higelin and Alain Bashung.

=== 2001–present ===
Fontaine's albums Kékéland (2001) and Rue Saint Louis en l'Île (2004) benefited from prestigious collaborations with artists such as Noir désir (with whom she also co-wrote and recorded the 23-minute track L'Europe on des Visages des Figures), Sonic Youth, Archie Shepp, - M-, Gotan Project, Zebda, etc. In 2005, after having given a series of concerts with her usual band (but also with La Compagnie des musiques à ouïr), she published a new novel, La Bête curieuse, whose erotic ambiance somewhat foretold the tonality of her sixteenth album, Libido (2006). This new album renewed her concerts with a lively energy and gave them a very "baroque 'n' roll" ambiance, in which Teresa of Avila, Sufis, Hollywood films, and Melody Nelson are invoked.

In October 2006, Fontaine appeared at the Barbican Centre in London along with Jarvis Cocker, Badly Drawn Boy and other English artists, for the first public interpretation of the mythic "Histoire de Melody Nelson". In January 2007, she appeared onstage with graphic novelist Blutch at the Angoulême International Comics Festival. On 29 March 2007, she invested in the Olympia music hall, supported by her friends Jacno, Arthur H, Christophe, Anaïs, Jacques Higelin, Maya Barsony and Jean-Claude Vannier. In April, she played at the Printemps de Bourges music festival and participated in her Québécois admirer Pierre Lapointe's concert for a duo of "La Symphonie pastorale". After having given a series of intimate concerts all through September on a barge anchored under the Pont des Arts on the Seine river in Paris, Fontaine toured throughout France. Between two concerts, she went into the studio with Olivia Ruiz to record a new single, "Partir ou rester", for which she wrote the lyrics.

In February 2008, she published a new novel, Travellings by Flammarion, while Benoît Mouchart wrote a monograph on her life and work ("Brigitte Fontaine, intérieur/extérieur"), published by Panama. A new album titled Prohibition and produced by Ivor Guest including collaborations with Grace Jones and Philippe Katerine was subsequently released in the fall of 2009. The lyrics of this new work mark the return of Fontaine to an anti-authority political position.

In March 2011 she released a new album, also produced by Ivor Guest. It is called L'un n'empêche pas l'autre, and consists primarily of duets, among others the dance track 'Dancefloor' with Grace Jones, which Polydor uploaded on their official site. In 2013, she released her latest album, named J'ai l'honneur d'être. The video for the first single "Crazy Horse" has been directed by Enki Bilal.

== Sources ==
- Benoît Mouchart, Brigitte Fontaine, intérieur/extérieur, éditions Panama-Archimbaud, 2008 ISBN 2-7557-0067-X
