= Carlos do Carmo (album) =

Studio album by Carlos do Carmo
- Released: 1970
- Genre: Fado
- Label: Tecla

Carlos do Carmo chronology
O Fado Em Duas Gerações (1969)	Carlos do Carmo (1970)	Por Morrer uma Andorinha (1970)

Carlos do Carmo is an album by fado singer Carlos do Carmo. It was released in 1970 on the Tecla label. It was later re-released by Universal Music Portugal.

== Track listing ==
Side A

1. "Gaivota" (A. O'Neill, A. Oulman) [4:04]
2. "Bairro Alto" (C. Neves, F. Carvalhinho) [2:22]
3. "Vim para 0 Fado" (Julio de Sousa) [2:10]
4. "Fado da Noite" (L. Neves, O. Silva) [2:50]
5. "Será Triste Mas É Fado" (Frederico de Brito) [3:12]
6. "Já Me Deixou" (A. Ribeiro, Max) [3:20]

Side B

1. "A Saudade Aconteceu" (Jorge Rosa, Popular) [2:03]
2. "Não Se Morre De Saudade" (Julio de Sousa, Popular) [2:57]
3. "Mãos Vazias" (J. Braganca, A Duarte) [2:20]
4. "Guardei Na Minha Saudade" (V.L. Couto, J. Proença) [2:39]
5. "A Voz Que Eu Tenho" (V. Limha Courto, J. Proença) [2:39]
6. "Rodam As Quatro Estações" (F. Texeira, R. Pinto) [2:44]

== Musical credits ==
- Jorge Costa Pinho - arrangements and direction of orchestra
- Fontes Rocha - guitar
- Carvalhinho - guitar
- A. Chainho - guitar
- José Maria Nóbrega - viola
- R Silva - viola
