= Por Morrer uma Andorinha =

Studio album by Carlos do Carmo
- Released: 1970
- Genre: Fado
- Label: Philips

Carlos do Carmo chronology
Carlos do Carmo (1970)	Por Morrer uma Andorinha (1970)	O Fado De Carlos Do Carmo (1971)

Por Morrer uma Andorinha, translated as For a Swallow Dies, is an album by fado singer Carlos do Carmo. It was released in 1970 on the Philips label. The title track became one of do Carmo's most popular hits.

== Track listing ==
Side A

1. "Por Morrer Uma Andorinha" (Frederico de Brito, Francisco Viana) [2:59]
2. "Há Festa Na Mouraria" (J. Marques, A. Amargo) [3:07]
3. "Um Dia" (Casimiro Ramos, G.P. da Rosa) [2:21]
4. "Fica-Te Mesmo a Matar" (Jaime Santos) [2:36]
5. "Quadras Soltas" (Francisco Viana, Silva Tavares) [2:42]
6. "Júlia Florista" (Leonel Villar e Joaquim Pimentel) [2:53]

Side B

1. "Padre Nosso" (Armando Freire, Frederico de Brito) [2:52]
2. "A Rua Do Desencanto" (Jaime Santos, Fernando Peres) [3:09]
3. "Dá Tempo Ao Tempo" (Antonio Campos, Joaquim Pimentel) [3:23]
4. "Aquela Feia" (Julio Proenca, Frederico de Brito) [3:29]
5. "Quadras De Amor" (Mouraria, Silva Tavares) [2:16]
6. "Vestida De Madrugada" (J.C. Junior, F. Peres) [2:50]

== Musical credits ==
- Fontes Rocha - guitar (A1, A2, A3, B1, B4, B5, B6)
- José Maria Nóbrega - viola (A2, A3, A4, A5, B2, B3, B5, B6)
- Jorge Costa Pinho - orchestra director (A1, B1, B4)
- Jaime Santos - guitar (A4, A5, B2, B3)
- Hidio Santos - guitar (A4, A5, B2, B3)
- Orlando Silva - viola (A4, A5, B2, B3)
