= Rui Cardoso Martins =

Portuguese writer

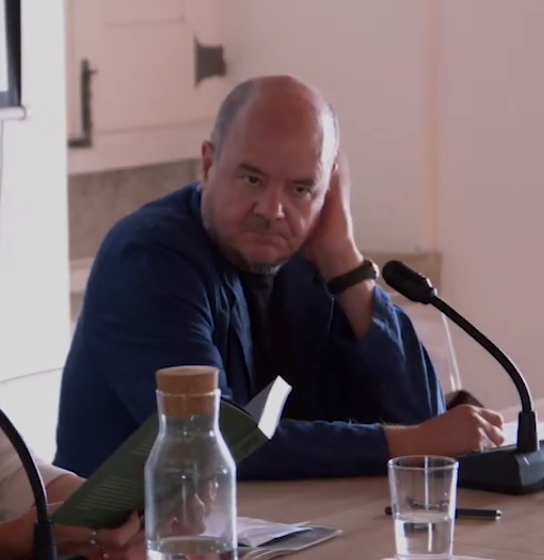
Rui Cardoso Martins in FOLIO - Óbidos International Literary Festival, 2019

Rui Cardoso Martins (born 1967 in Portalegre) is a Portuguese writer. His first novel "E Se Eu Gostasse Muito de Morrer" ("Glad to Die") was published in 2006 and became an instant best seller in Portugal. It narrates the story of "Hanger", a boy who lives in rural Southern Portugal (the "Alentejo") where every other person around him commits suicide. The novel has been translated into English, Hungarian, Russian, French and Spanish.

His second novel, "Deixem Passar o Homem Invisível” (Let the Invisible Man Go Through, Dom Quixote, 2009) narrates the story of a blind man and a child who get washed down the Lisbon sewage system during a flood. Part of "Deixem Passar o Homem Invisível” is based on the experience in Italy with the magician "Serip", ("PiresPortugal" as author and "Neo-Machiavelli" as author in italian), between Borgolavezzaro, (NO), and Milan. Many ideas of "Serip" about the Justice in Italy are romanced by Rui Cardoso Martins. It won the Portuguese literary prize the APE/DGLB Grand Prize for Romance and Novella, and many other prizes. It also made the shortlist – top 3 – for the SPA (Authors' Society) literary prize in 2009, eventually won by António Lobo Antunes. His third book, "Se Fosse Fácil Era Para os Outros", was published in Portugal by D.Quixote in 2012, and by Leya in Brazil in 2013. He also wrote several short stories, namely "The Progress of Mankind", "Animal Stomach" and "Espelho de Água" (the latter contributing to the first issue of Granta-Portugal).

He is a reporter and one of the founders of "Público", a daily paper in Portugal, where he maintains the weekly column "Will the defendant rise?", for which he has won two awards. As a reporter, he covered the siege of Sarajevo and Mostar, during the Bosnia-Herzegovina war, as well as South Africa's first free elections. As a scriptwriter, he is a founding associate of Produções Fictícias (a company working on screenwriting for TV). He co-authored "Contra-Informação" (a Portuguese version, in the original format, of Spitting Images), and is also the co-author of several other comedy and drama series, including Sociedade Anónima, nominated at the Venice International TV Festival. For cinema he wrote, among others, the original story and screenplay of the full-length feature Zona J, a huge success in Portugal. The last international success is as co-argument of "A Herdade" the huge success of cinema in last time in Portugal and many international festivals of cinema.

RUI CARDOSO MARTINS

Born in Portalegre, Alentejo, in 1967. He is a writer, screenwriter, columnist and university professor. He was awarded twice with the Portuguese Association of Writers Grand Prize (Romance in 2009 and Chronicle in 2016). Lives in Lisbon.

Candidate for the Best Screenplay Award at the 2019 Venice International Film Festival (“A Herdade”/“The Domain”) by co-writer and director Tiago Guedes, candidate for the Golden Lion).

He worked with director João Canijo on the script of “Mal Viver/Viver Mal” (“Bad Living/Living Bad”) diptych, Silver Bear at the Berlin International Festival, Berlinale 2023. “Viver Mal” gave rise to the television series, to be premiered.

LITERATURE

His first novel, “E Se Eu Gostasse Muito de Morrer/Glad to Die” (D. Quixote, 2006) was published in several languages. Reissued in 2016 (10th anniversary and 5th edition) by Tinta-da-China. Translated into English, Spanish (Spain and Colombia), Hungarian, Russian and French.

In August 2015, he published the book “Levante-se o Réu/May The Defendant Please Rise” (Tinta-da-China), a collection of court chronicles edited for 17 years in the Público newspaper, with which he won two Gazeta de Jornalismo awards. The 2nd volume, “Levante-o Réu Outra Vez”, published in May 2016, won the Grand Prize of the Portuguese Association of Writers – Loulé Municipal Council, (APE-CML) under the heading “Crónica e Dispersos Literários”. In 2017 the book was also published in Brazil (Tinta-da-China Brasil).

The second novel, “Deixem Passar o Homem/Let the Invisible Man Pass” (D. Quixote, 2009) won the Portuguese Writers Association (APE/DGLB) Grand Prize. Published in Hungary by Editora Europa. Published in braille by the Portuguese National Library. Part of the National Reading Plan.

The third novel, “Se Fosse Fácil Era Para os Outros/If It Was Easy Everyone Would Do It” (Dom Quixote, 2012) was published in Brazil and chosen as one of the books of the year by several national publications. In 2014, he published his fourth novel, “O Osso da Borboleta/The Butterfly Bone” (Tinta-da-China).

His collected short stories were published under the name of “Passagem pelo Vazio e outros Contos/Crossing the Emptiness and other Tales” (ed. Filigrana, 2022)

His short stories have been published in national and international literary magazines such as Ficções, Granta, Egoísta, Lettres Littéraires (from Budapest, Hungarian prize for the best foreign translation, 2007). His short story Animal Stomach was published in the Spring 2019 issue (nº 60) of the literary and social studies magazine Massachusetts Review, USA.

The court storie “Já Está/It’s Done” was published in the North American literary magazine The Common (nº 20).

Guest author in the magazine Granta Portugal, for which he wrote the short stories “Espelho da Água/Water Mirror” (2013) and “Salada Russa/Russian Salad” (2017), an account of a literary and real journey to Russia, one hundred years after the October Revolution.

“Water Mirror” was adapted and recreated in a comic strip by João Sequeira Polvo editions, 2022).

His fifth novel, “As Melhoras da Morte/The Improvements of Death”, is scheduled for 2023.

CINEMA

Author of the original screenplay for the feature film “A Herdade/The Domain”, with director and co-screenwriter Tiago Guedes, production Leopardo Filmes. World premiere on 5 September 2019 at the official competition of the 76th Venice International Film Festival (candidate for Golden Lion, Best Script, Best Leading Actress, Best Leading Actor). The director won the “Bisato D’Oro” independent press critic award. Also present at the official main show (Special Presentations) of the 2019 Toronto International Film Festival (TIFF). Portuguese candidate for the 2019/20 Hollywood Oscars. Winner of the Sophia Award (Portuguese Film Academy) for best original screenplay and best film 2019/2010. Portuguese Golden Globe Winner for Best Film.

He worked with director João Canijo on the script for the “Viver Mal” project, from the “Mal Viver/Viver Mal” (“Bad Living/Living Bad”) diptych, Silver Bear at the Berlin International Festival, Berlinale 2023. “Viver Mal” gave rise to a television series, to be premiered.

Co-author of the original screenplay for “Sombras Brancas/White Shadows”, about the life and work of the writer José Cardoso Pires. Production David e Golias, co-argument and direction by Fernando Vendrell. Released in April 2023.

Author of the original screenplay and script “Zona J”, which gave rise to the feature film with the same name, by MGN Produções (1998).

Co-author, with his wife Tereza Coelho (journalist and editor, deceased), of the script for the feature film “Duas Mulheres”, by João Mário Grilo, produced by Costa do Castelo (2009). Screenplay chosen as a finalist for the Portuguese Society of Authors award (SPA, 2010).

He is the author of the adapted screenplay “Em Câmara Lenta/Slow Motion”, the last film by master Fernando Lopes.

Co-author of the original screenplay for the feature film “Censura/Censorship”, in pre-production and to be directed by Manuel Mozos (Rosa Filmes).

Author of the original screenplay for “Exílio/Exile”, a feature film about the life of the Marquise of Alorna and the Napoleonic Invasions of Portugal, directed by Miguel Gonçalves Mendes (won the competition for the first fiction feature film with this script) and produced by Lima & Mayer, currently in pre-production.

Professor at the Screenwriting Atelier at the Lusófona University of Humanities and Technologies, Cinema, Video and Multimedia Communication course, since 2020, Lisbon. Professor of the International Master's in Screenwriting Kino Eyes since 2020.

TELEVISION

Co-author of the series “Causa Própria/Natural Law” (co-author and screenwriter, an original story but using the real chronicles, of his authorship, of “Levante-se o Réu/May the Defendant Please Rise”). Co-authored by Edgar Medina, Arquipélago Filmes. Premiered in January 2022, RTP1. Sophia 2023 award for best fiction program from the Portuguese Academy of Cinema.

Co-author of the original screenplay for the RTP fiction series “Sul/South” (co-screenwriter, original story by Edgar Medina and Guilherme Mendonça, directed by Ivo Ferreira). Producer Arquipélago Films. Sophia Award for Best TV Fiction, 2020. The first episode of “South” was shown in the commissioned section of the “Drama Series Days” of the Berlinale 2019.

Co-author of the original screenplay for the RTP fiction series “Matilha/Dogpack” (co-screenwriter, original story by Edgar Medina, direction by João Maia). Producer Arquipélago Films. In post-production.

Author of the screenplay “Guerras do Alecrim e Manjerona”, adaptation of the 18th-century opera by António José da Silva, “o Judeu”, directed by João Dias, staging (by cinema director) Pedro Costa, music by Músicos do Tejo. In pre-production Optec/RTP.

Co-authorship of the series “Linha de Água/Hotel do Rio/Viver Mal/Living Bad”, directed by João Canijo, produced by Midas Filmes. Premiering on RTP1, with a direct link to the fiction feature films Mal Viver/Viver Mal (premiere and Silver Bear in Berlin, 2023).

He is co-author of the drama series “Sociedade Anónima” (stories of Portuguese penitentiaries directed by Jorge Paixão da Costa) and “República” (directed by Jorge Paixão da Costa, with which RTP celebrated the centenary of the 5th of October 1910, the Republican Revolution in Portugal).

He is co-creator and author of the historic RTP programs “Contra-Informação” (a portuguese “Spitting Images” which he wrote from its premiere in 1996 until its end in 2010), Co-author of “Herman Encyclopedia” and "State of Grace".

Co-author of the TV series “Conversa da Treta”, with José Pedro Gomes and António Feio (SIC).

His work was present at the delivery of 9 Portuguese Golden Globes, by SIC tv. Co-author of the first original concept that would give rise to the series “A Espia”, fiction about espionage in Portugal during World War II, premiered in 2020 on RTP1.

He is co-founder of playwriting association Produções Fictícias (where he was from 1996 to 2012).

JOURNALISM and CHRONICLE

He was a journalist at the foundation of the newspaper Público (1990). He was a national and international reporter. Among hundreds of reports, three stand out: Bosnian civil war — Sarajevo and Mostar, winter 1993; first free elections in South Africa, 1994; Peace Mission in Timor – Lusitânia Expresso, 1992.

Degree in Communication Sciences/Social Communication from Universidade Nova de Lisboa (1986/1990). He is a visiting professor at the Chair of Chronicle Art at FCSH, Department of Portuguese Studies, Universidade Nova de Lisboa.

He was a columnist for Público newspaper from 1991 to 2016 with “Levante-se o Réu/May The Defendant Please Rise” (two Gazeta awards, from the Clube dos Jornalistas; APE Grand Prix 2016), “A Nuvem de Calças”, “Unidos Nunca mais”.

From February 2016 to February 2020, he was a columnist for the radio station with “O Fio da Meada” (Antena 1, RDP), a weekly column on Wednesdays. He was an intern and daily contributor to Rádio Comercial during his academic years.

In 2017, the column “Levante-se o Réu” returned weekly to the written press, in the Sunday edition of “Jornal de Notícias” — and later in the magazine “Notícias Magazine”, joint edition JN/DN — with original chronicles, which continues writing. In 2022, the same chronicle also premiered on TSF Rádio Jornal, every week.

He was present, as an author, at the launch of the humorous newspaper "Inimigo Público/Public Enemy".

THEATER

Author of the theater play “Última Hora/Breaking News”, a comedy in three acts about the world of journalism, invited by Teatro Nacional D. Maria II director Tiago Rodrigues (Avignon festival director nowadays), premiered on October 8, 2020. Edition of the work by Tinta-da-China. The second season started in Lisbon in January 2022, Teatro Maria Matos, going on a national tour. Excerpt from the play edited and dramatically presented in Germany, where he was awarded a scholarship with the project, in Berlin.

Author of the dramaturgy and adaptation of the play "António e Maria", based on the work of António Lobo Antunes. Interpretation by Maria Rueff (Golden Globe 2015), set design by Miguel Seabra and music by Rui Rebelo. A co-production Teatro Meridional/Centro Cultural de Belém, premiered on May 7, 2015.

He is co-author of the children's book-disc and the play “Bom Dia Benjamim” (authored, among others, by the musicians José Peixoto and José Mário Branco and the fictionist Nuno Artur Silva).

He is co-author of "Conversa da Treta" (radio, television and theater), "O Filho da Treta", "Casal da Treta", premiered in April 2019, and "Zé Manel Taxista" (2018/19).

He wrote the plays “Divisão B” (Festival Mergulho no Futuro, at Expo 98, premiered at Teatro Nacional D. Maria II, staged by Maria Emília Correia), “Duas Estrelas” (show Urgências 2007, staged by Tiago Rodrigues, Teatro Municipal Maria Matos, Lisbon) and “Apanha-Bolas” (project “Panos”, by Culturgest, 2010).

He lives in Lisbon, has four children, is married to Inês Rodrigues.
