= Lucília do Carmo =

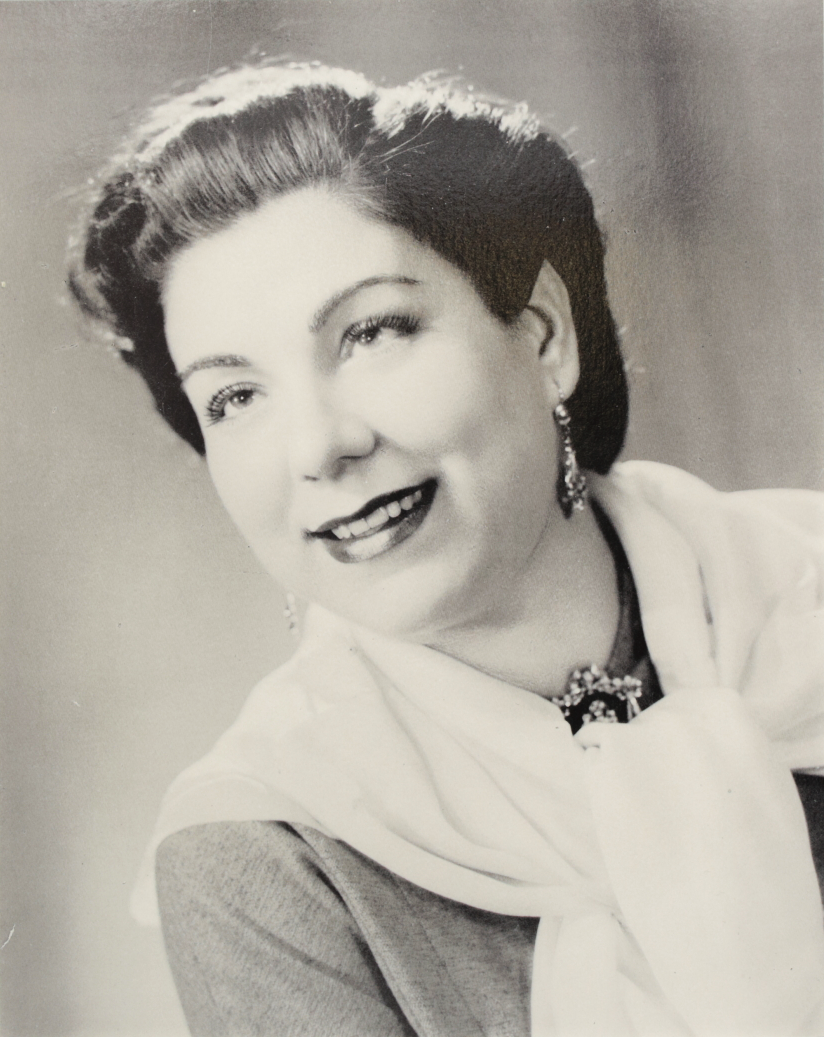

Background information
- Born: Lucília Nunes de Ascensão do Carmo; 4 November 1919; Portalegre, Portugal
- Died: 19 November 1998 (aged 79) Lisbon, Portugal
- Genre: Fado
- Occupation: Singer
- Instrument: Vocals

Lucília Nunes de Ascensão do Carmo (4 November 1919 – 19 November 1998) was a Portuguese fadista (fado singer) and the mother of Carlos do Carmo.

== Biography ==
At the age of five, together with her family, headed by her father Francisco, Carmo settled in Lisbon.

Her debut as a fado singer took place at Retiro da Severa, in 1936, when she was only 17 years old, in the presence of the owners and businessmen of the most typical fado houses in Alfama, Bairro Alto and Mouraria, typically the three Lisbon fadistas neighborhoods. Her presence on stage and voice captured the audience's attention and recognition came quickly.

Shortly afterwards, she participated in fado programs at Emissora Nacional, Rádio Graça and Rádio Luso, and the radio was also responsible for promoting Carmo's name and increasing her popularity.

Carmo married Alfredo de Almeida and in 1939 her son Carlos do Carmo was born, who, influenced by his mother, would later become a great fado singer, with a successful national and international career.

Next, she retired for five years from Lisbon's cultural circles, acting in Brazil and Mozambique, where she exhibited, among other spaces, at Casino da Costa, in Lourenço Marques. From her time at that casino, she would report the newspaper Canção do Sul, of 16 August 1943, of the "(...) formidable success achieved by the popular singer Lucília do Carmo".

In 1947, two years after the end of the Second World War, Carmo and Almeida opened a fado house, called Adega da Lucília, which later changed its name to O Faia. The house, where Carmo was the main artistic performance, was located in Bairro Alto, right in Rua da Barroca. Knowing several casts over the years, singers from different generations sang there, such as Alfredo Marceneiro, Tristão da Silva, Carlos Ramos or Camané. Ary dos Santos, who also frequented O Faia, said one day of the fado singer "Lucília do Carmo is, as far as I am concerned, a fado classic!."

She avoided studios, few records she recorded. However, her discography included hits like Leio em teus olhos, Foi na Travessa da Palha, Maria Madalena, Não gosto de ti, Preciso de te ver, Senhora da Saúde, Olhos garotos, Antigamente, Tia Dolores, Loucura, Zé Maria and Lá vai a Rosa Maria.

In the 1980s, she withdrew from artistic life. Undoubtedly, she remains in the public's and critic's memory as a lady of fado corrido, considered one of the best voices of Fado ever.

Carmo died in Lisbon on 19 November 1998.

== Discography ==
- Fado Lisboa: an evening at the "Faia" (1974)
- Lucília do Carmo (1978)
- O melhor de Lucília do Carmo (1990)
- Fado em Tom Maior (1995)
- Maria Madalena (1997)
- Biografias do Fado (1998)
