= Ribeira de Nisa e Carreiras =

- Civil parish
- Location in Portugal
- Coordinates: 39.35°N 7.43°W
- Country: Portugal
- Region: Alentejo
- Intermunic. comm.: Alto Alentejo
- District: Portalegre
- Municipality: Portalegre

Area
  - Total: 50.43 km^{2} (19.47 sq mi)

Population (2011)
  - Total: 1,949
  - Density: 38.65/km^{2} (100.1/sq mi)
- Time zone: UTC+00:00 (WET)
  - Summer (DST): UTC+01:00 (WEST)

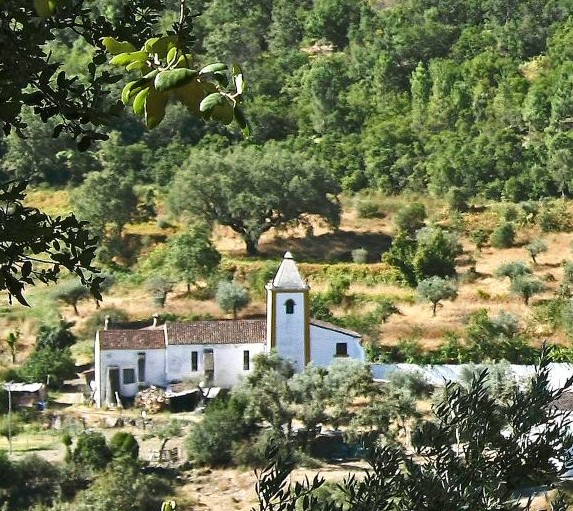

Ribeira de Nisa e Carreiras is a civil parish in the municipality of Portalegre, Portugal. It was formed in 2013 by the merger of the former parishes Ribeira de Nisa and Carreiras. The population in 2011 was 1,949, in an area of 50.43 km^{2}.
