= Roman villa of Ammaia =

Roman ruins in Portugal

Roman Ruins of Ammaia
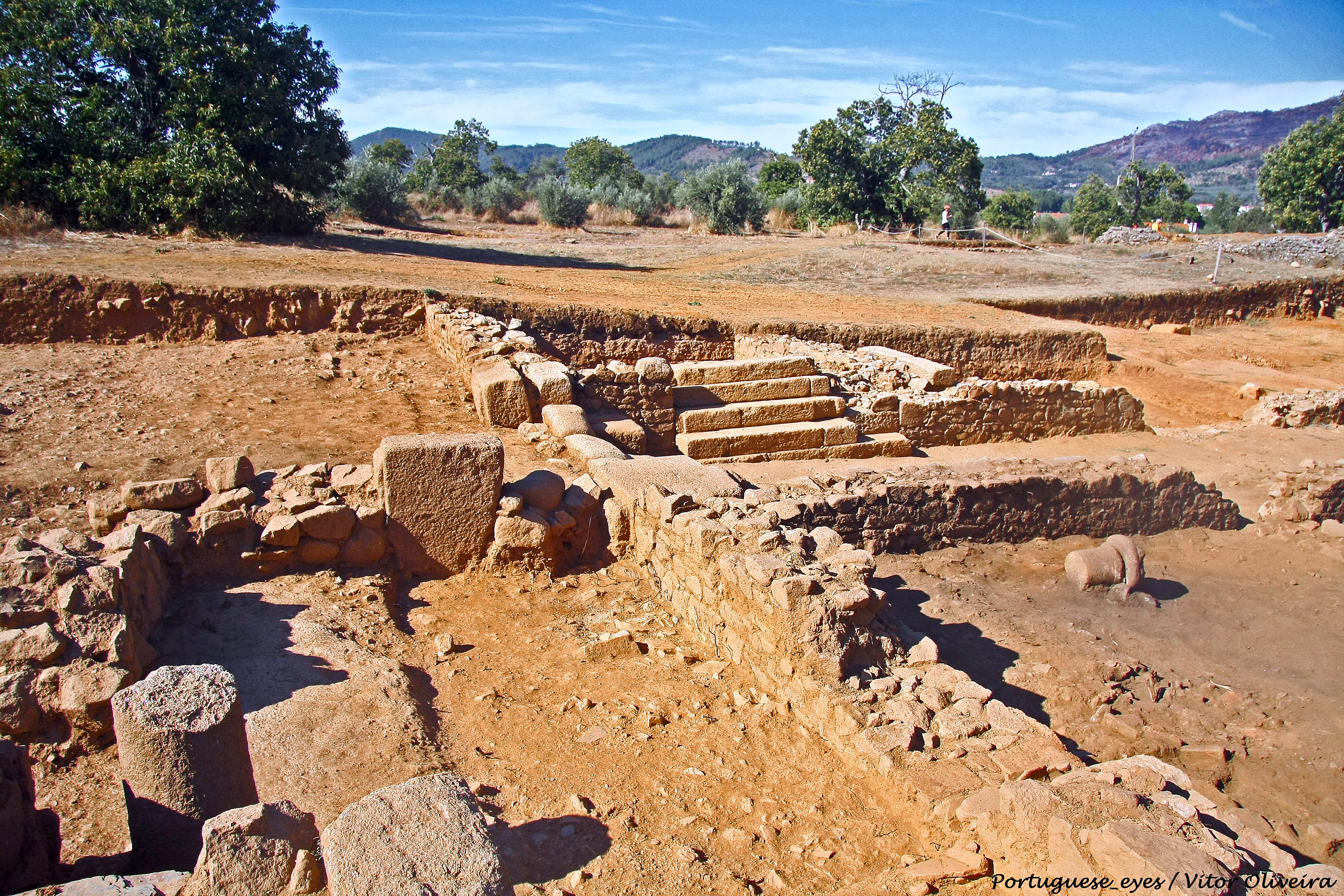
- Interactive map of Roman Ruins of Ammaia
- 39°22′9.59″N 7°23′11.03″W
- Type: Ruins
- Location: Portalegre, Alto Alentejo, Alentejo, Portugal

Site notes
- Elevation: 526 m (1,726 ft)
- Length: 691.75 m (2,269.5 ft)
- Width: 547.91 m (1,797.6 ft)
- Archaeologists: unknown
- Owner: Portuguese Republic
- Public access: Private Along the E.N.359, immediately before the settlement of São Salvador de Aramenha (from Portalegre)

The Roman ruins of Ammaia are located in Portugal within the Nature Park of the Serra de São Mamede, a mountainous expanse of forest in the civil parish of São Salvador da Aramenha, municipality of Marvão, along the border with Spain.

== History ==
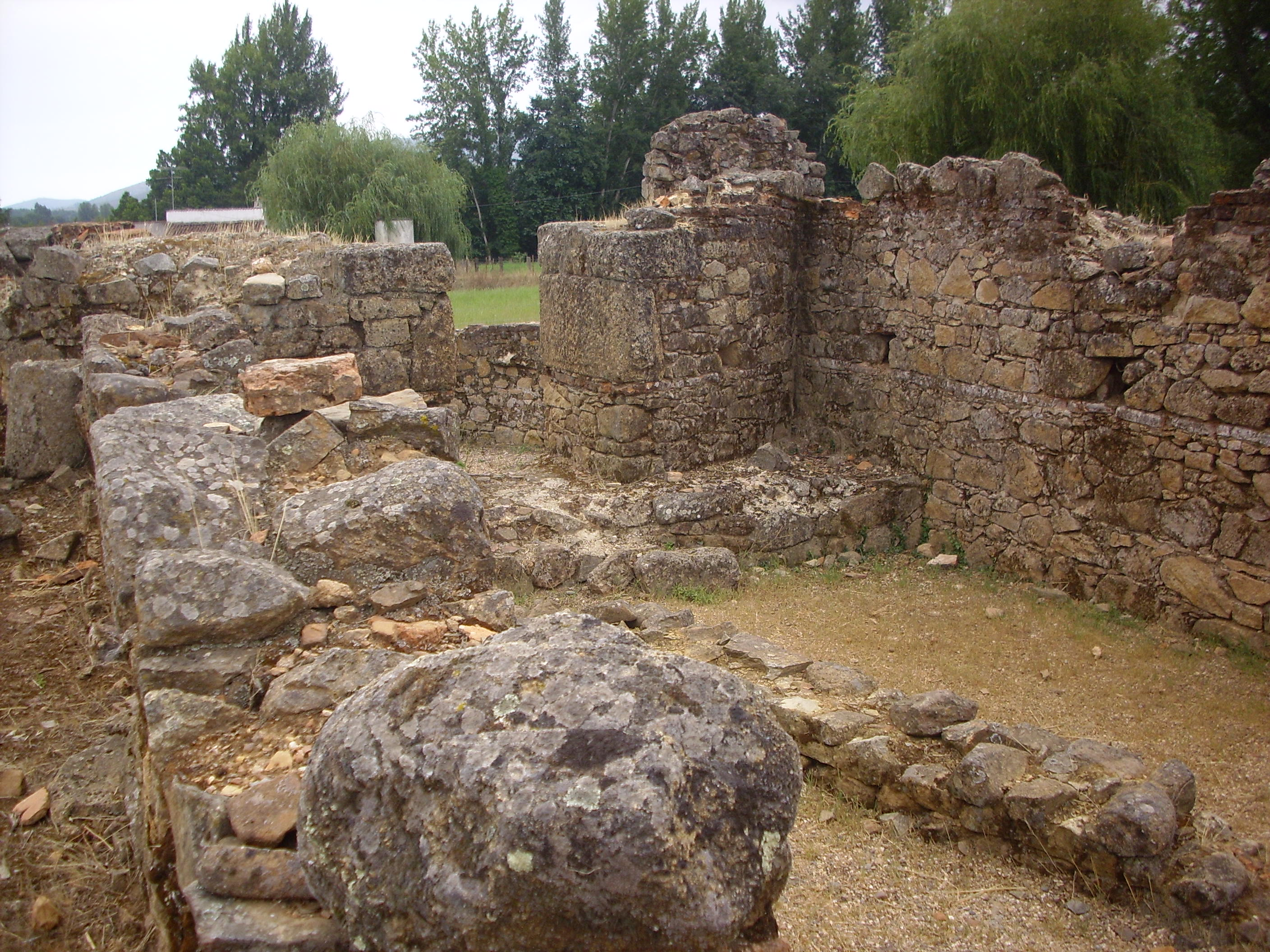
The edifício da Quinta do Deão constructed on the Roman ruins of Ammaia

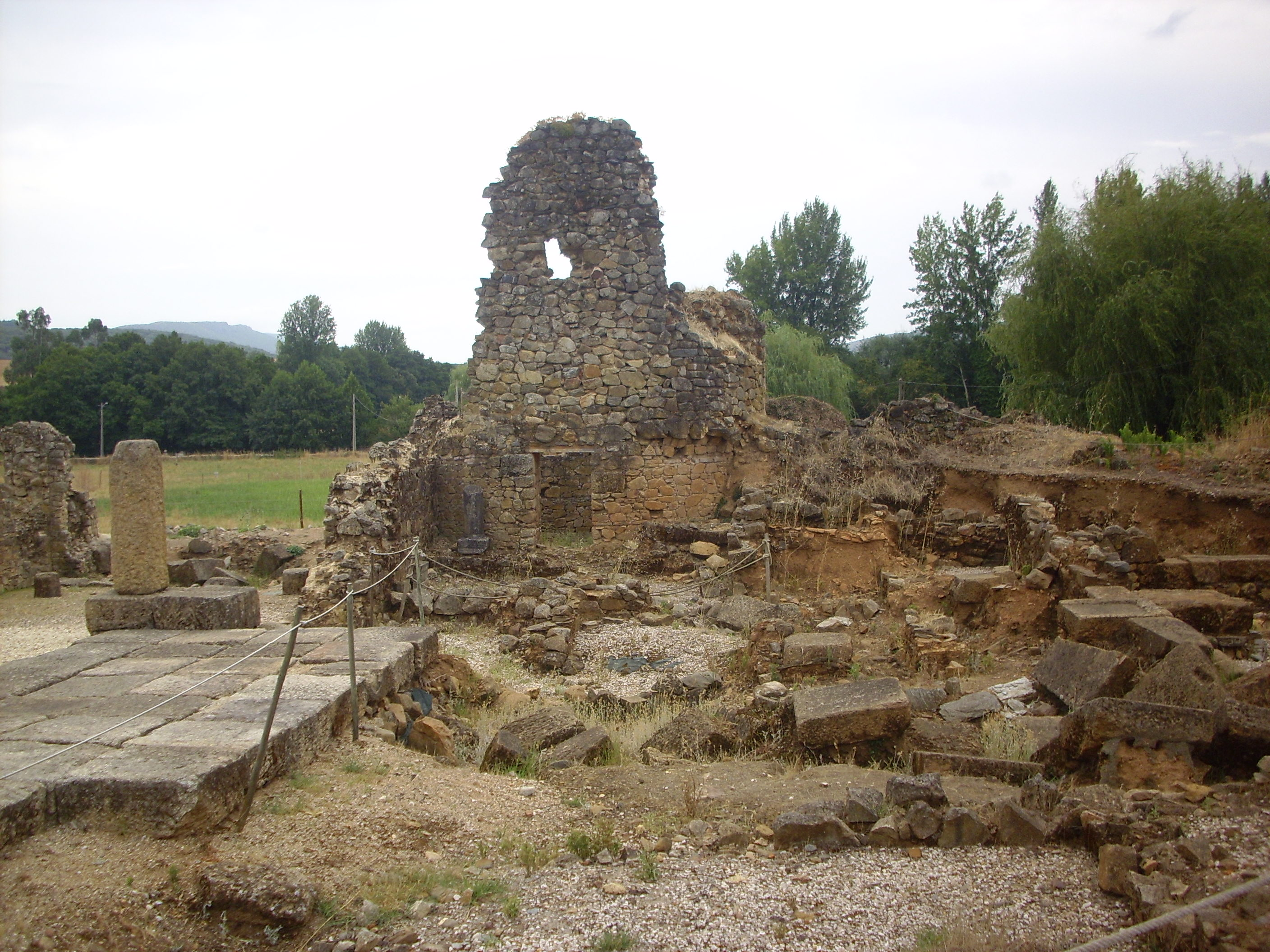
One of the towers at the southern portal of Ammaia

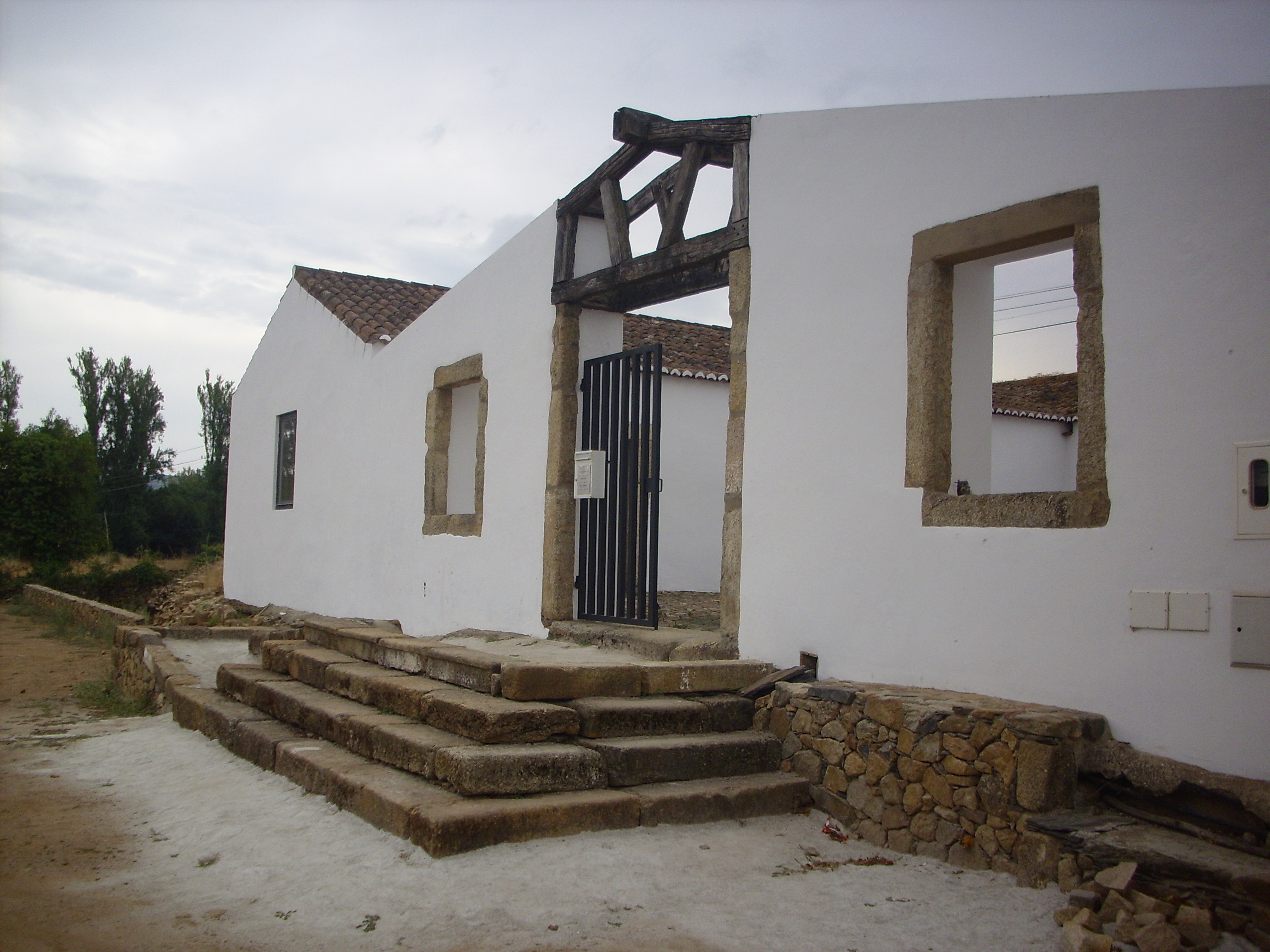
The visitors centre/museum with some examples of the artifacts at the archaeological site

The Roman town of Ammaia was founded in the 1st century, likely under the reign of Claudius. Archaeological research from the early 21st century suggest that the town was already intensively settled around the reign of Augustus (end of the 1st century BC-beginning of the 1st century AD). The flourishing Roman town, lying in the Roman province of Lusitania, acquired its civitas statute in 44–45 AD, although there is some debate on whether it received its municipal status (municipium) during the reign of Nero, Lucius Verus or Vespasian. Many of its urban structures developed through the exploitation of the area's natural resources, and access to several roads connecting it to the provincial capital of Emerita Augusta (Mérida).

During the 4th century there was a systematic reconstruction and restoration of the spaces of Ammaia. Yet, between the 5th and 9th centuries, Ammaia fell in decline and depopulated. When this part of the Iberian peninsula was already under Arab rule, the city seems to have been completely abandoned in favor of the nearby fortified settlement of Marvão. Ibn Maruán, an influential and powerful muladi began using the self-styled title of master of Ammaia and its ruins in the 9th century.

In 1398, there is a reference to a mill along the Ribeira de Sever, owned by Diogo Gonçalves, a resident of Marvão.

Around the beginning of the 16th century, there are references to the use of materials from the ruins in Ammaia to construct religious projects in Portalegre and neighbouring communities. By 1619, Diogo Pereira de Sotto Maior indicated that the bridge of Portagem was still visible during a hike, noting: "...where there still appears a base that the river could not undue. It was torn down and destroyed by greed, to say, that it stole the rights of the goods passing to the kingdom of Castile. In its place, was constructed another far below the same river (Sever), which is a tower that is below the city (of Ammaia), which was called Portagem. There used to reside the guards of the kingdom, who executed the rights of the King."

In 1710, one of the gateways from the site were extracted for the Castle of Vide, and later destroyed.

Spanish investigator D. José de Viu (in 1852) cited the sale of 20 statues from Ammaia to England.

The archaeological and historical identification of the site as the Roman town of Ammaia dates from the mid-thirties (1935). It was Leite de Vasconcelos who first proved that the Roman site was the city of Ammaia, and not Medóbriga, as was presupposed by André de Resende. It was first referred to as Medóbriga by Pliny, by Arab authors such as ʿĪsā al-Rāzī and by various writers and historians during the 16th century, including André de Resende, Father Amador Arrais, Diogo Pereira de Sotto Maior and Duarte Nunes de Leão.

On 26 April 1982, the old bridge of Ammaia finally collapsed. Part of the Roman road, and referred to as the Ponte Velha (old bridge), it was situated at quite a distance from the main ruins (four kilometres). It was a unique arch, constructed of masonry and Roman stonework.

The beginning of archaeological investigations of the Roman ruins began in 1994, and was followed by similar projects in 1995 and 1996 under the Fundação Cidade de Ammaia; there was a topographic survey and excavations were done in four locations, which also involved cleaning, studying and conservation: the Porta do Arco, Forum and Temple, Quinta do Deão building and the Forum baths. Since 2007, supervision of scientific research was handled by the University of Évora. The site of Ammaia has been chosen as "open-lab" of the European funded project Radio-Past, and it is now used as test-site for the integration and innovation in non-destructive approaches to complex archaeological sites (surface artifacts collections, geophysical and geo-archaeological survey, remote-sensing and aerial photography).

== Architecture ==
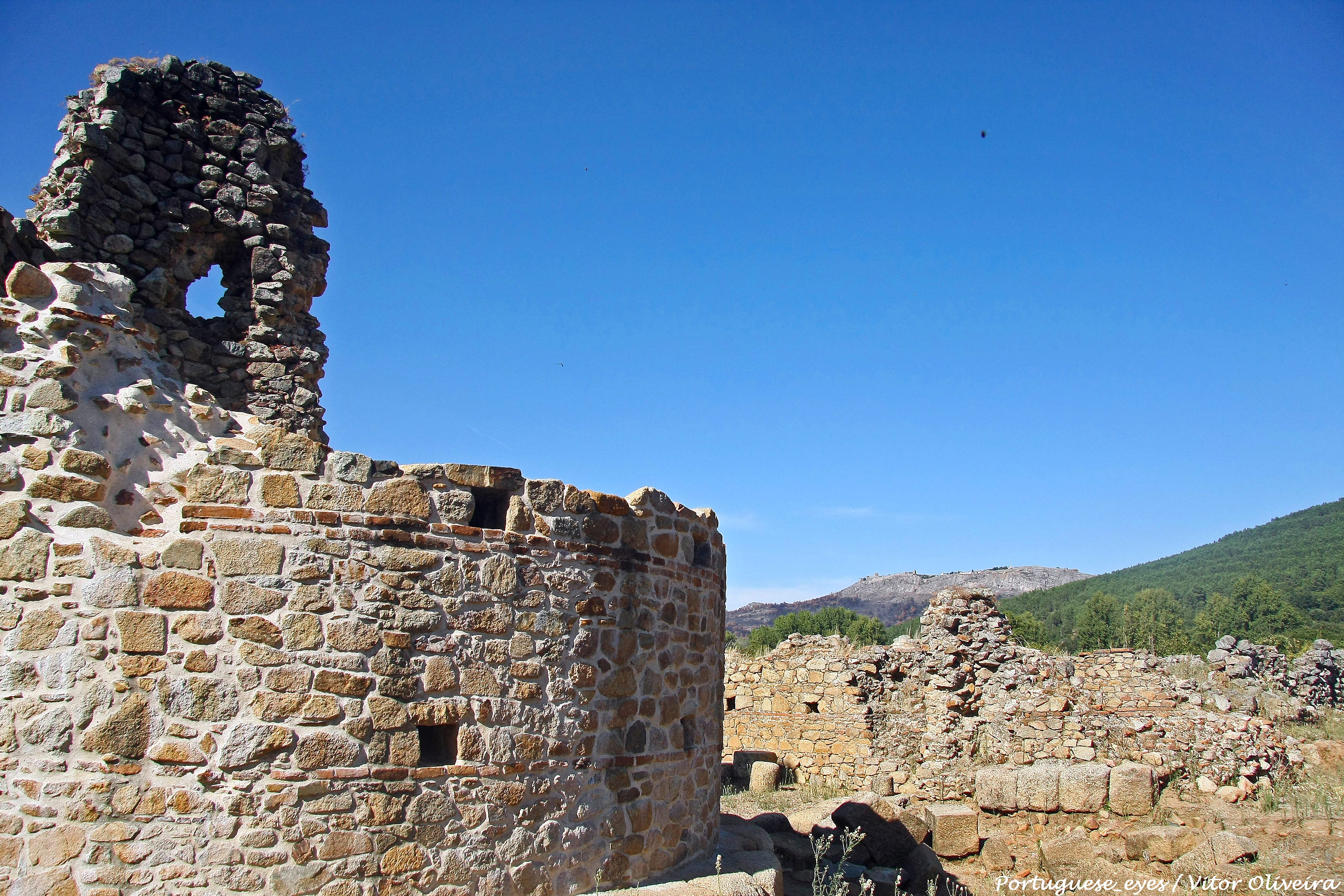

The ruins are situated along the margins of the Sever River, alongside the village of São Salvador da Aramenha. Its remnants extend along a valley/plain crossed by the E.N.359 motorway and overlooked by the hilltop citadel of the Castle of Marvão. At the base of this winding river, the site is secluded within dense vegetation and high forest. Within these ruins are the old bridge downstream, where the Tower of Portagem (a rectangular tower with eastern entrance) and the bridge of Portagem are located.

Many of the excavations were concentrated over the obvious ruins or where there was evidence of subterranean structures associated with a Roman presence. Discoveries include parts of a Roman city wall with towers and a gate on the south side, with residential buildings; a road; a monumental paved square; remains of a house in the location Quinta do Deão; parts of a public bath building; and a centrally located forum with well-preserved temple podium, walls of a portico and cryptoporticus. The town plan follows a regular rectangular layout organized along two main perpendicular street axes, linking the central forum to its main gates. A city wall surrounds a roughly rectangular area of some 20 hectares. Several extramural buildings, cemeteries and roads constitute the suburban area.

Four areas of note:

- the Porta do Arco (Arch doorway) and group of monuments, which included dispersed remnants, the base of two towers (6.3 metre diameters) that flanked the entrance to the city, a hearth and a public square (21.3 metres by 10.75 metres), oriented east to west;
- a Forum and temple, an elevated podium of a temple (17.3 metres by 9 metres) on the extreme southeast, a structure that could have been the foundations of a staircase, as well as similar vestiges of the foundations of a monument;
- a Residence (called the edifício da Quinta do Deão) with kitchen, whose walls are supported by the ancient walls; a pavement and water pipes/conduits; and many materials from the original Roman building were used in the construction, including inscriptions;
- a small Baths complex associated with the Forum. Also discovered in these excavations were artefacts typical of the Roman era, including coins, pottery and glass, some of which were transferred to the National Museum of Archaeology in Lisbon.

The Quinta do Deão hosts an on-site museum where the most interesting finds from Ammaia are displayed.

== Artifacts ==
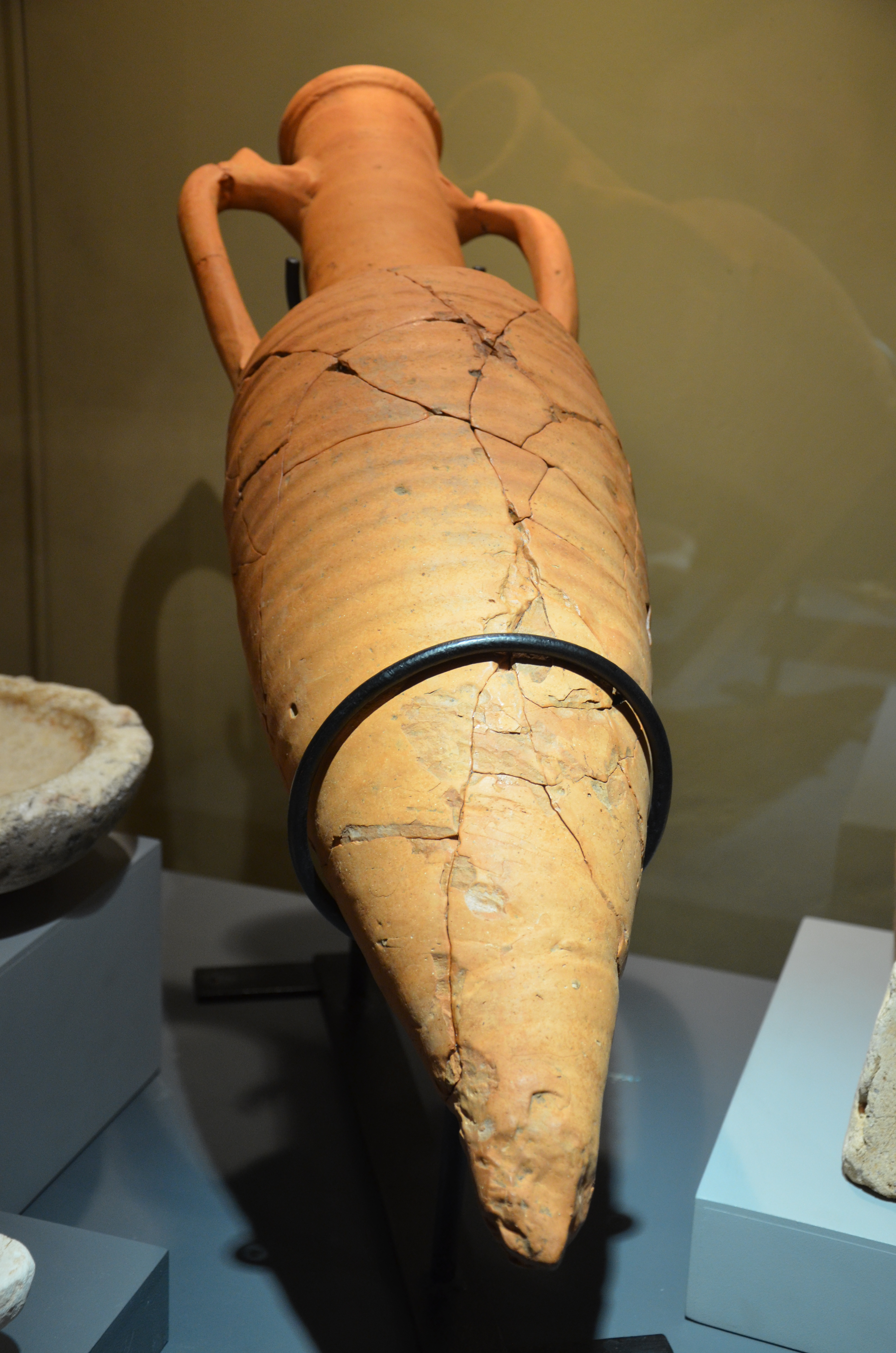

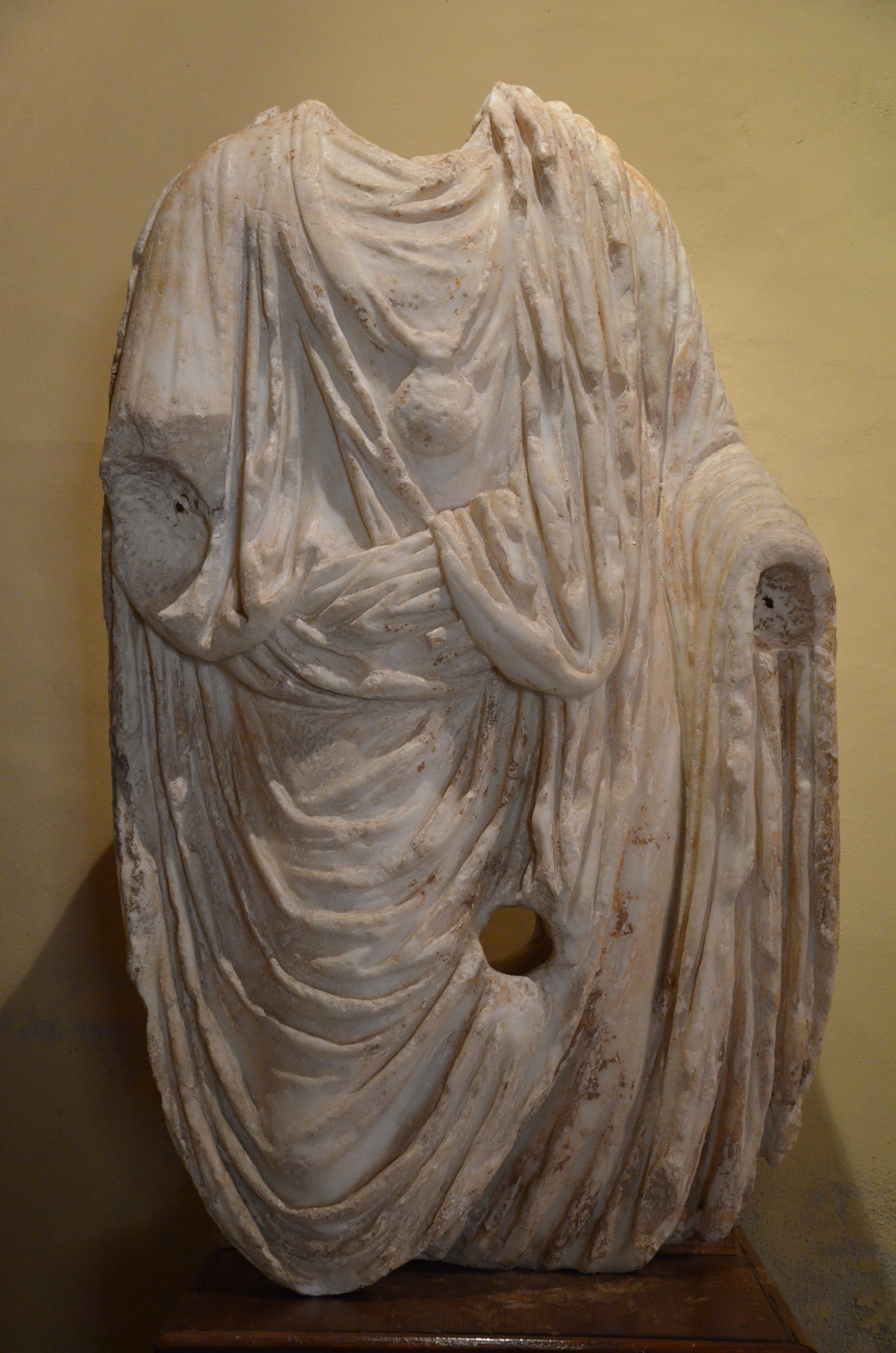

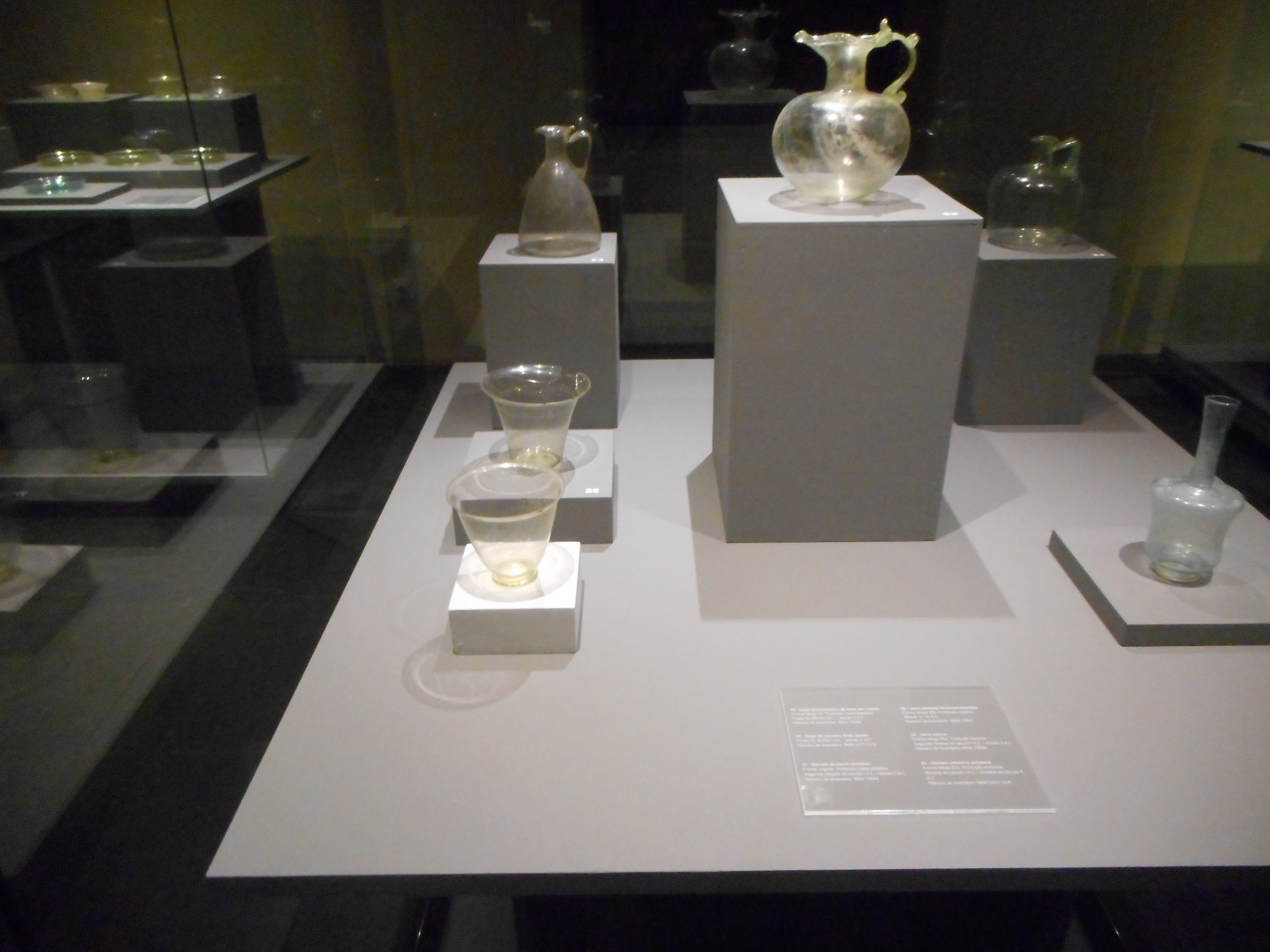

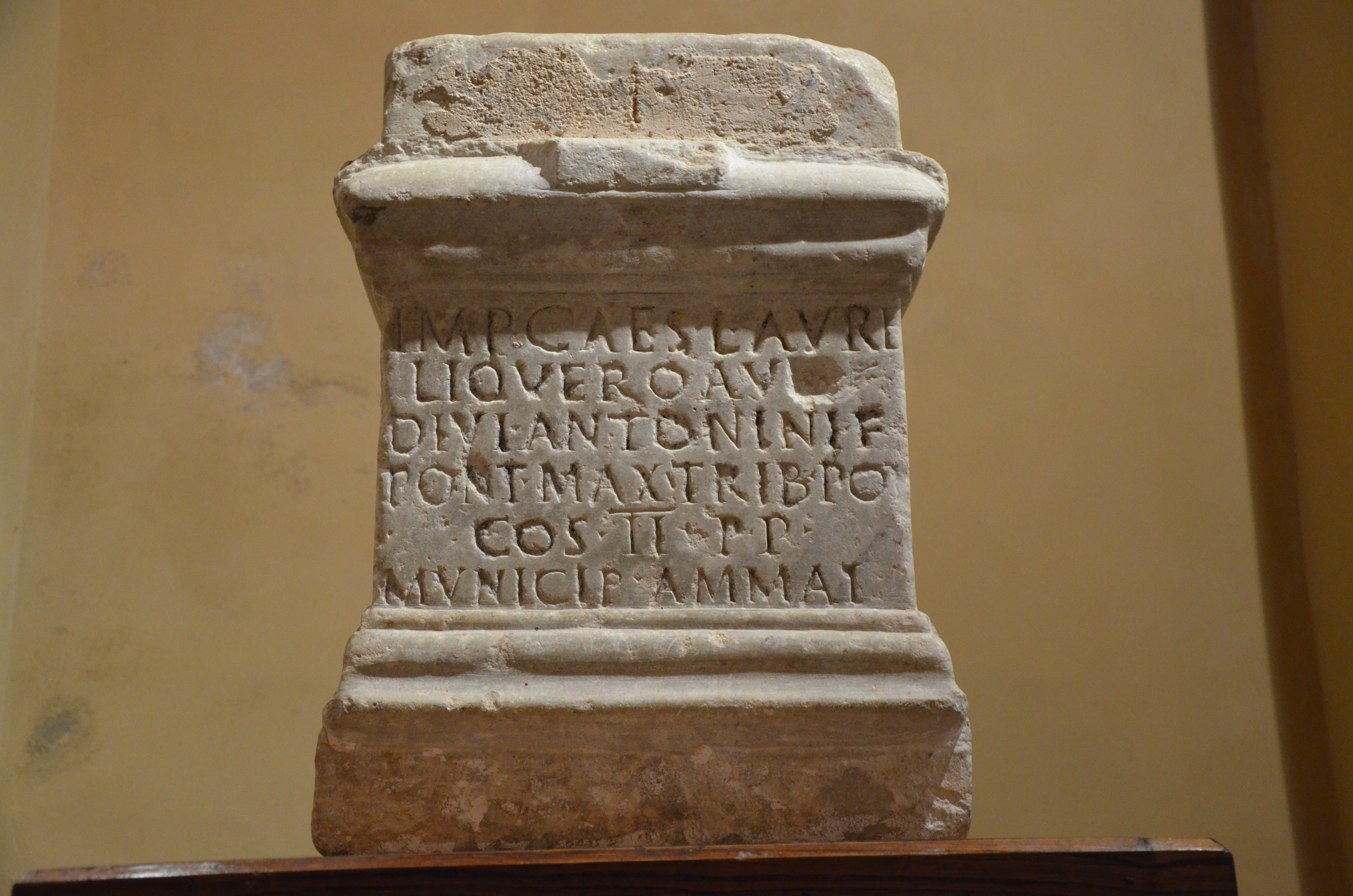
