= Portalegre, Portugal =

Portalegre
- Municipality
- City of Portalegre
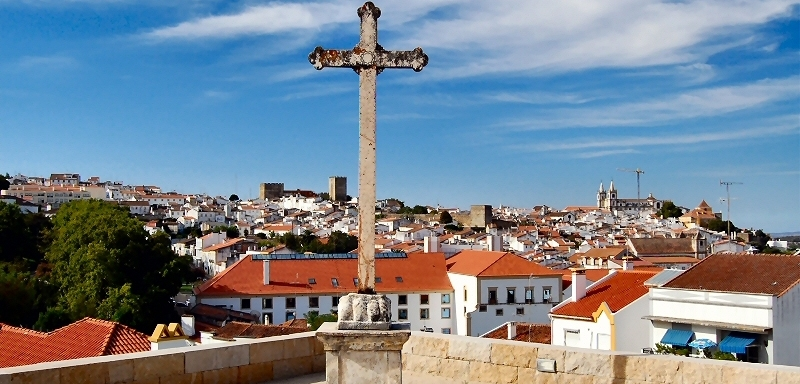
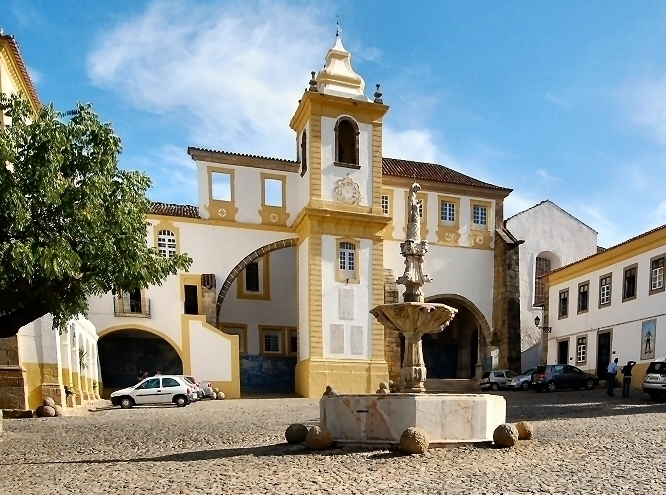
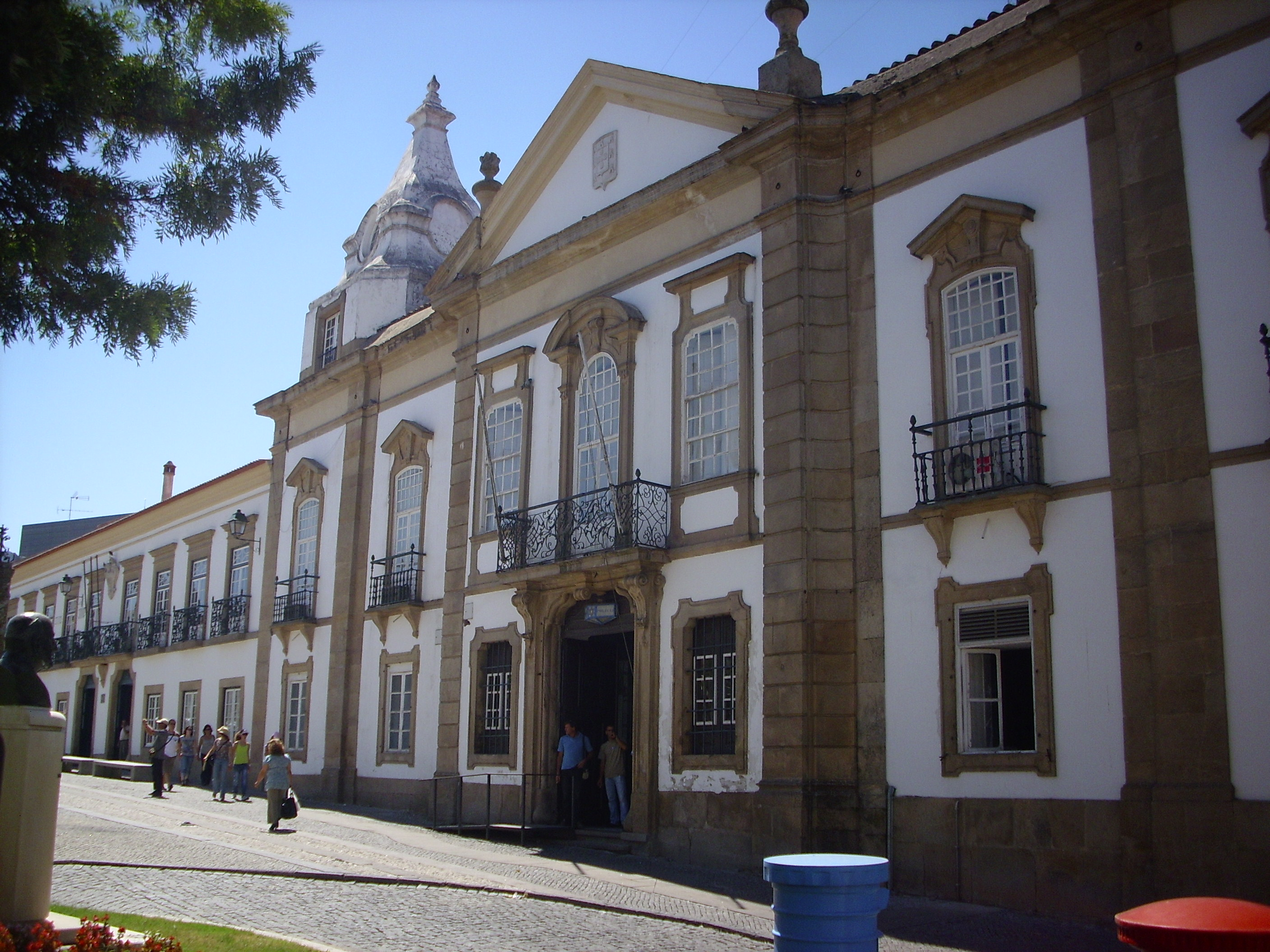
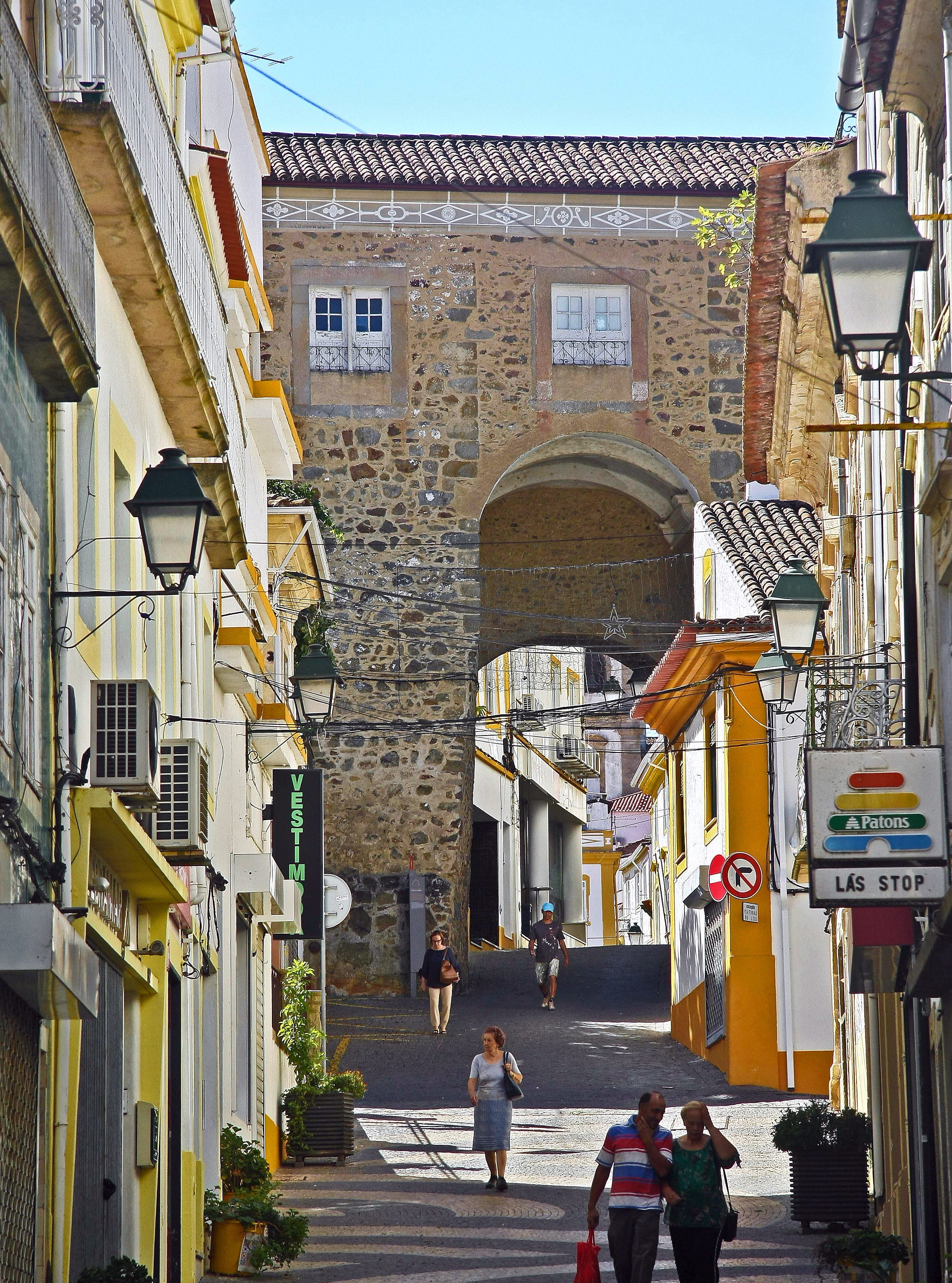
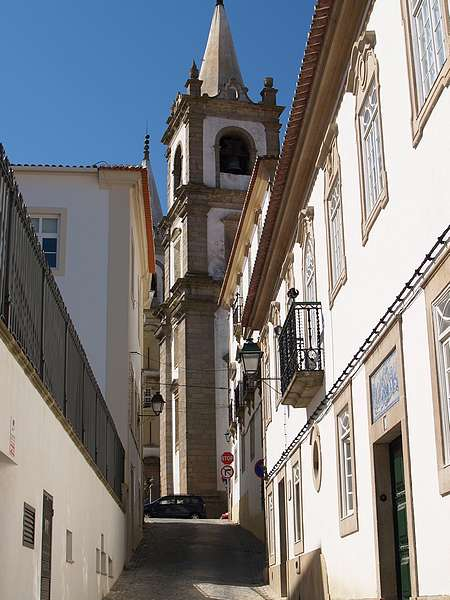
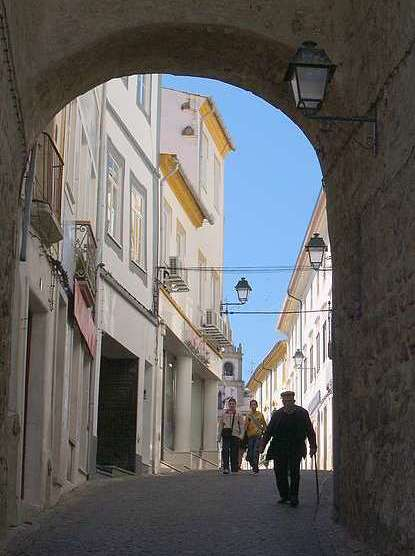

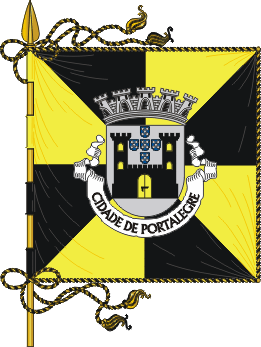
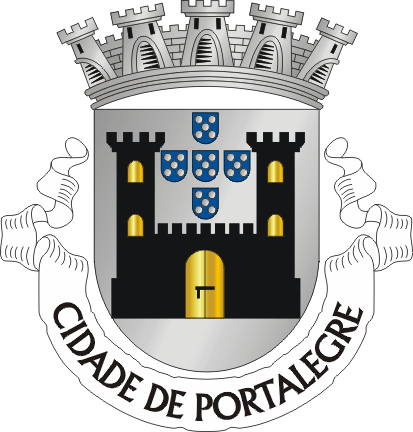
- Flag Coat of arms
- Interactive map of Portalegre
- Coordinates: 39°19′N 7°25′W
- Country: Portugal
- Region: Alentejo
- Intermunic. comm.: Alto Alentejo
- District: Portalegre
- Parishes: 7

Government
  - President: Fermelinda Carvalho (PSD)

Area
  - Total: 447.14 km^{2} (172.64 sq mi)
- Elevation: 480 m (1,570 ft)

Population (2021)
  - Total: 22,368
  - Density: 50.025/km^{2} (129.56/sq mi)
- Time zone: UTC+00:00 (WET)
  - Summer (DST): UTC+01:00 (WEST)
- Local holiday: 23 May
- Website: www.cm-portalegre.pt

Portalegre (pronounced [puɾtɐˈlɛɣɾɨ]), officially the City of Portalegre (Portuguese: Cidade de Portalegre), is a municipality in Portugal. The population as of 2011 was 22,368, in an area of 447.14 square kilometres (172.64 sq mi). The municipality is located by the Serra de São Mamede in the Portalegre District.

Its name comes from the Latin Portus Alacer (meaning "cheerful port"). The municipal holiday is 23 May. According to the 2001 census the city of Portalegre had 15,768 inhabitants in its two parishes (Sé and São Lourenço). These two parishes, plus the eight rural parishes, had a total of 25,608 inhabitants. The current mayor is Adelaide Teixeira, who was elected as an independent.

== History ==
According to a frequently mentioned legend, described by Friar Amador Arrais in his 1589 work, Diálogos, Portalegre was founded by Lísias in the 12th century BC, following the disappearance of his daughter Maia. She was walking with Tobias when she is coveted by a vagabond, Dolme, who kidnaps and murders Tobias.

Lísias is desperate for his daughter's disappearance and goes in search of her, eventually finding her dead by a stream that today is named Ribeiro de Baco. Lísias will die of joy when she thinks she has seen her daughter extend her arms to her. The city that was founded in the meantime was given the name of Ammaia. Lysias would also have built a fortress and a temple dedicated to Bacchus on the site where the Church of São Cristóvão stands today. According to Friar Amador Arrais, ruins of this temple still existed in the 16th century.

It is believed the legend resulted from fantasies somehow supported by the existence of a tombstone with a dedication to the Roman emperor Commodus (161-192), which was probably brought from the ruins of the Roman city at São Salvador da Aramenha, near Marvão, which is now commonly accepted as the Roman Ammaia referred to in various historical sources.

The location of this and other cities mentioned in sources from the Roman period, Medóbriga, was the subject of controversy until, at least, the beginning of the 20th century, with speculation until that time whether there were any important ancient settlements in the area currently occupied by the city or in its surroundings.

The name of Portalegre comes from Portus Alacer (meaning "happy" port or crossing point). It is likely that in the 12th century there was a village in the valley to the east of Serra da Penha. The name of Portalegre, where one of the important activities would be to provide shelter and food for travelers (hence the name of port, crossing point or supply). The contrast of its green slopes and valleys with the more arid and monotonous landscape to the south and north may have contributed to its name. The village prospered. In 1129, it was a village in the municipality of Marvão, becoming the seat of the municipality in 1253, having been awarded the first charter in 1259 by Afonso III, who ordered the construction of the first fortifications, which were never completed.

Along with Marvão, Castelo de Vide and Arronches, Portalegre was donated by Afonso III to his second son, Afonso.

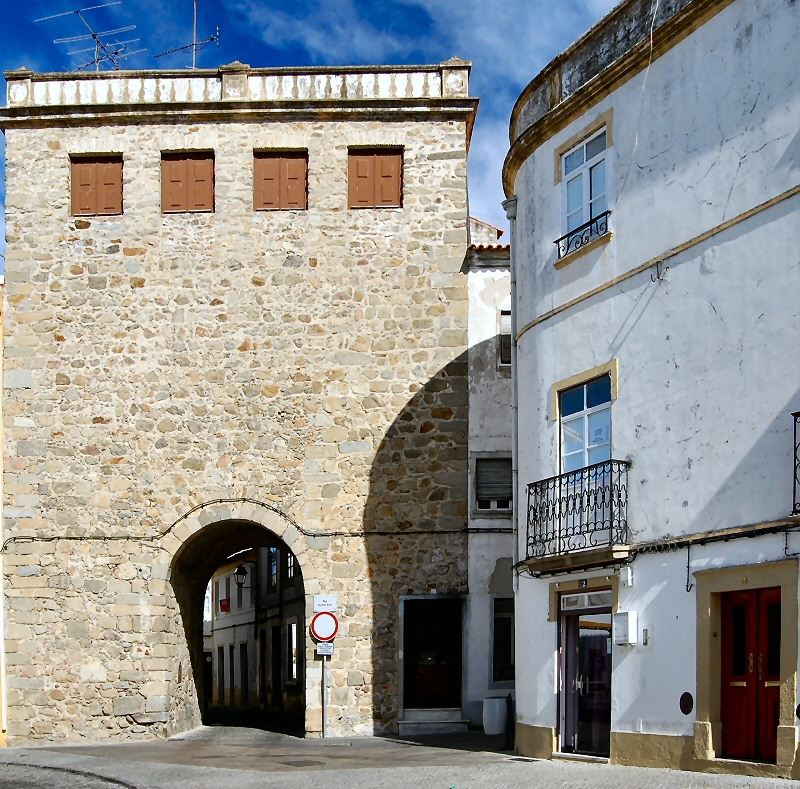
Porta de Alegrete, one of two gates of the curtain walls of the Castle of Portalegre

The next king ordered the construction of the first walls in 1290, which he himself would surround for 5 months in 1299, following the civil war that opposed him to his brother, who asserted the throne claiming that Denis was an illegitimate child.

That same year, Denis would grant Portalegre the privilege of not being assigned the lordship of the village "neither the infant, nor the rich man, nor the rich lady, but being of the King and of his first heir son".

After Ferdinand I died in 1383 without leaving any male heirs, Leonor Teles assumed the regency of the Kingdom at the same time that she became acquainted with Count Andeiro, a Galician nobleman. This situation upset a large part of the people, the bourgeoisie and a part of the nobility, as it was feared that this situation would reinforce the claims to the Portuguese throne of John I of Castile, who was married to Beatrice, the daughter of Ferdinand and Leonor.

This dynastic crisis, which involved a warlike civil war between Portugal and Castile, would come to be known as the 1383-1385 Crisis. The strongest party among those who opposed the claims to the throne of John I of Castile and D. Beatrice supported the coronation of John of Aviz.

Among the nobles who supported John of Aviz was Nuno Álvares Pereira, brother of the then mayor of Portalegre, Pedro Álvares Pereira, Prior of Crato, who was a staunch supporter of Leonor. This position of the mayor provoked the revolt of the people of Portalegre, which surrounded the castle and forced Dom Pedro to flee to Crato. The former mayor would die in 1385 at the Battle of Aljubarrota, where he fought on the opposite side of his brother, Nuno.

The town grew in importance and on August 21, 1549 the Diocese of Portalegre was created, by a bull of Pope Paul III, following steps in this direction by John III, who would elevate Portalegre to the city on 23 May 1550.

The importance of the city at that time was reflected, for example, in the volume of revenue from the tax on Jewish quarters, which was similar to that of Porto, and only surpassed by those of Lisbon, Santarém and Setúbal. It was also one of the most important fabric industry centers in the country, along with Estremoz and Covilhã.

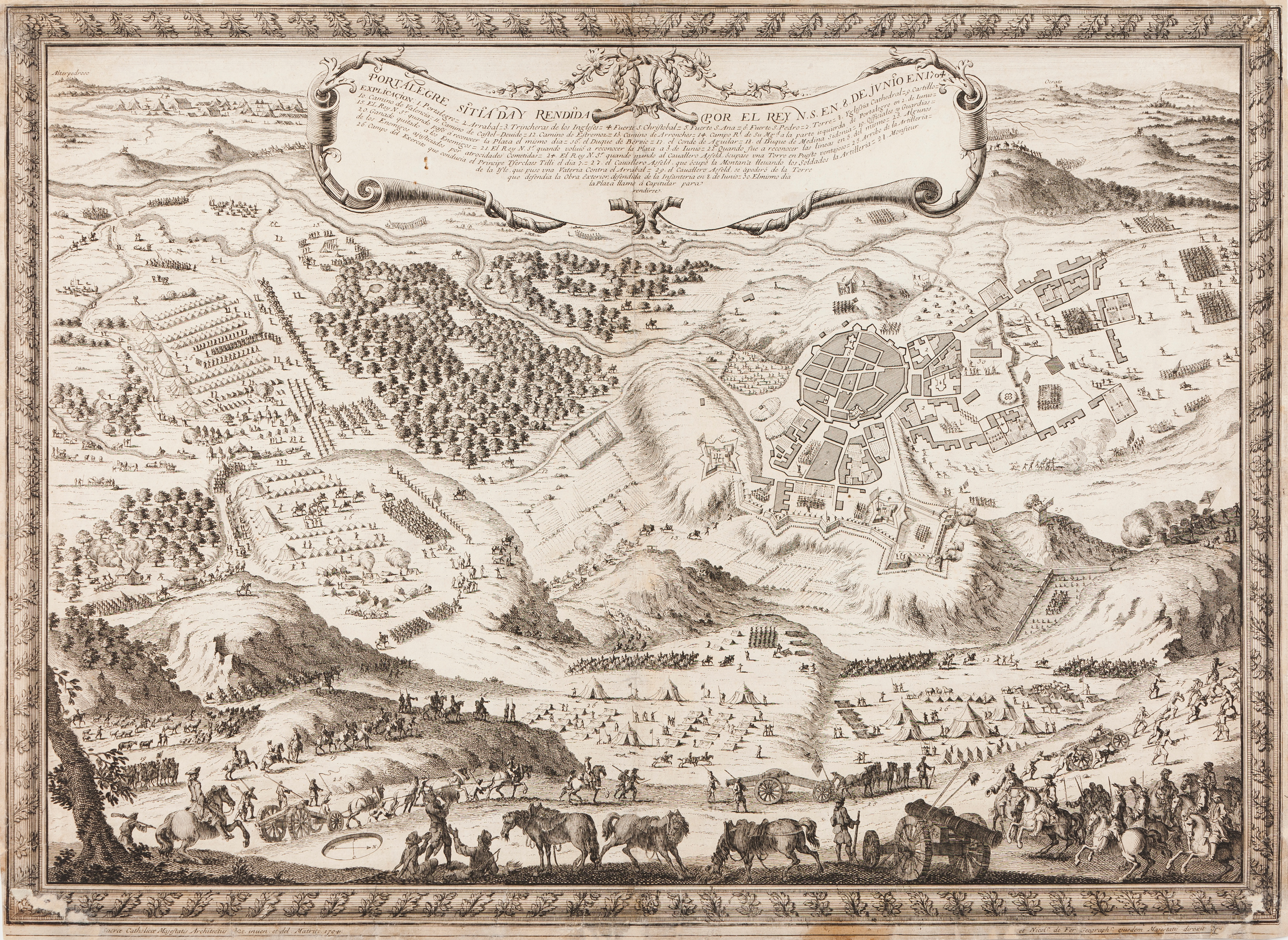
Engraving depicting the siege of Portalegre by the troops of Philip V of Spain in 1704

Owing to its proximity to the border with Spain, over the years Portalegre endured many invasions by foreign troops.

In 1704, during the War of the Spanish Succession, it was attacked and conquered by the army of Felipe V; again in 1801 during the War of the Oranges, it surrendered to the Spanish Army, in an attempt to counter the French dominion. In 1847, it was occupied by forces of the Spanish General Concha.

Portalegre becomes capital of the homonymous district when the districts were formed on 18 July 1835.

== Geography ==
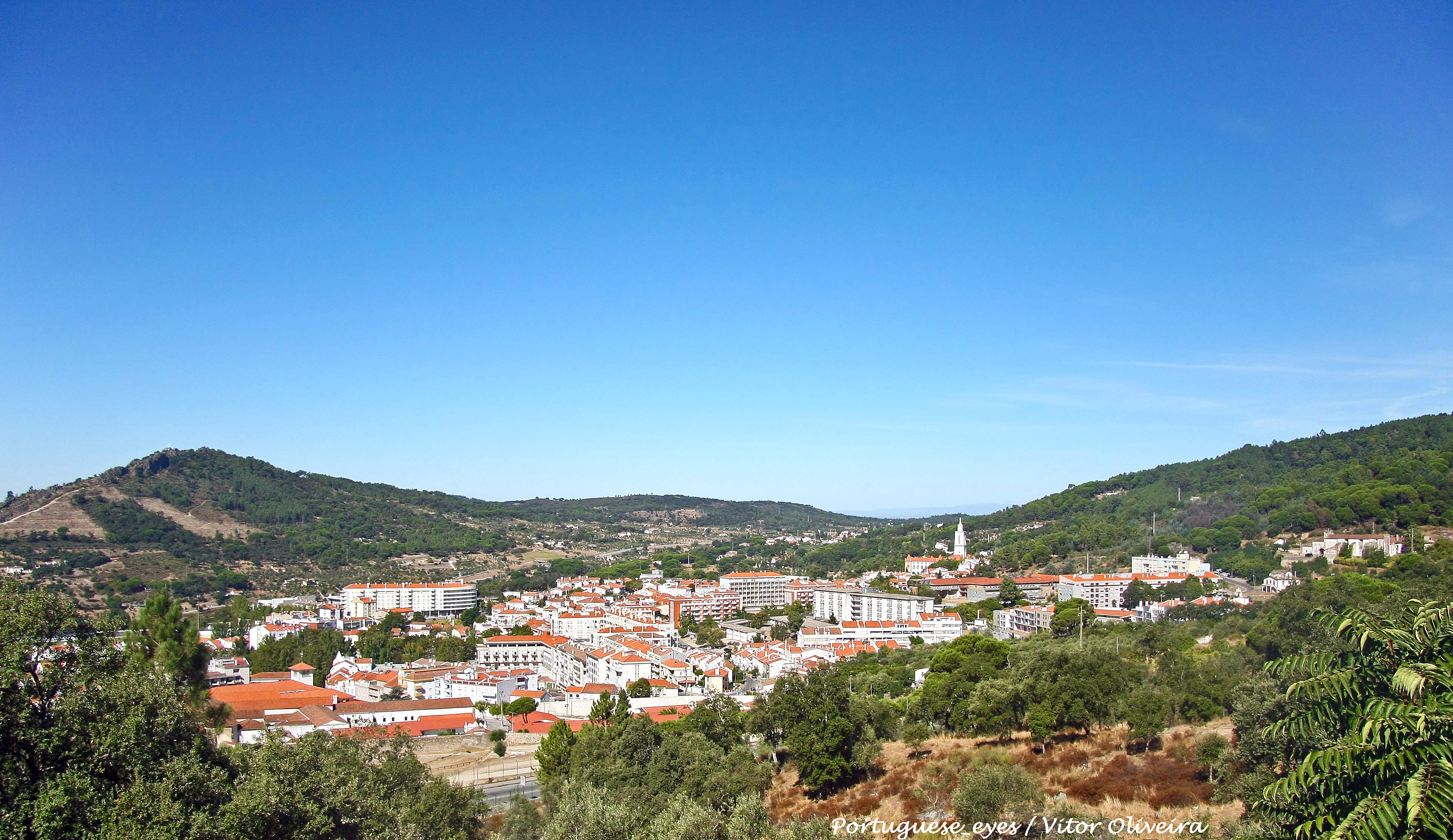
Panorama of the city of Portalegre, Alentejo

Although the landscape of the municipalities north of Portalegre is still typically Alentejo, with relatively flat areas alternating with mostly relatively low hills, Portalegre is often described as a transition zone between the drier, flat Alentejo and the Beiras, wetter and mountainous. The terrain is more varied than in the rest of Alentejo in general, which contributes to the landscape having its own peculiar characteristics.

The city is located at an altitude of between 400 and 600 m (1,300 and 2,000 ft), in the transition zone between the relatively flat landscape, but with many low hills to the south and west, and the mountainous system of Serra de São Mamede, which surrounds it to the north, east and southeast.

The geology is varied, which translates into the variety of soils, with zones of schist, greywacke, limestone and quartzite.

The unique characteristics of the landscape, flora and fauna are at the base of the creation of the Serra de São Mamede Natural Park, which includes a considerable part of the municipality's area.

=== Climate ===
Portalegre has a Mediterranean climate (Köppen: Csa) with hot, dry summers and mild winters. Its position at the foot of Serra de São Mamede gives it cooler day temperatures, higher precipitation and lower insolation than the surrounding municipalities.

Climate data for Portalegre (elevation: 597 m or 1,959 ft), 1991-2020 normals
| Month | Jan | Feb | Mar | Apr | May | Jun | Jul | Aug | Sep | Oct | Nov | Dec | Year |
|---|---|---|---|---|---|---|---|---|---|---|---|---|---|
| Record high °C (°F) | 22.3 (72.1) | 23.4 (74.1) | 27.4 (81.3) | 31.0 (87.8) | 34.8 (94.6) | 40.2 (104.4) | 41.7 (107.1) | 41.9 (107.4) | 41.3 (106.3) | 33.7 (92.7) | 25.7 (78.3) | 21.1 (70.0) | 41.9 (107.4) |
| Mean daily maximum °C (°F) | 11.6 (52.9) | 13.2 (55.8) | 16.3 (61.3) | 18.1 (64.6) | 22.3 (72.1) | 27.4 (81.3) | 31.2 (88.2) | 31.3 (88.3) | 26.8 (80.2) | 20.7 (69.3) | 14.8 (58.6) | 12.3 (54.1) | 20.5 (68.9) |
| Daily mean °C (°F) | 8.7 (47.7) | 9.7 (49.5) | 12.2 (54.0) | 13.6 (56.5) | 17.2 (63.0) | 21.3 (70.3) | 24.3 (75.7) | 24.5 (76.1) | 21.5 (70.7) | 16.9 (62.4) | 11.8 (53.2) | 9.6 (49.3) | 15.9 (60.7) |
| Mean daily minimum °C (°F) | 5.8 (42.4) | 6.1 (43.0) | 8.0 (46.4) | 9.1 (48.4) | 12.1 (53.8) | 15.2 (59.4) | 17.3 (63.1) | 17.8 (64.0) | 16.2 (61.2) | 13.1 (55.6) | 8.9 (48.0) | 6.8 (44.2) | 11.4 (52.5) |
| Record low °C (°F) | −4.5 (23.9) | −3.7 (25.3) | −4.3 (24.3) | −0.2 (31.6) | 2.3 (36.1) | 5.0 (41.0) | 8.2 (46.8) | 9.4 (48.9) | 8.3 (46.9) | 2.3 (36.1) | 0.3 (32.5) | −1.2 (29.8) | −4.5 (23.9) |
| Average precipitation mm (inches) | 105.5 (4.15) | 81.3 (3.20) | 83.0 (3.27) | 79.4 (3.13) | 68.7 (2.70) | 17.5 (0.69) | 4.9 (0.19) | 8.4 (0.33) | 40.7 (1.60) | 124.5 (4.90) | 116.5 (4.59) | 108.0 (4.25) | 838.4 (33) |
| Average precipitation days (≥ 1 mm) | 10.0 | 8.1 | 8.5 | 8.9 | 7.1 | 2.9 | 1.0 | 1.5 | 4.2 | 9.6 | 9.8 | 9.4 | 81 |
| Average relative humidity (%) | 77 | 74 | 65 | 68 | 65 | 56 | 47 | 48 | 55 | 68 | 75 | 79 | 65 |
| Mean monthly sunshine hours | 142.0 | 146.0 | 194.0 | 206.0 | 273.0 | 293.0 | 356.0 | 339.0 | 240.0 | 199.0 | 153.0 | 146.0 | 2,687 |
Source 1: Instituto de Meteorologia
Source 2: NOAA (1961-1990 sunshine hours) Nisa Municipality (Humidity)

=== Parishes ===
The municipality is composed of 7 parishes:

- Alagoa
- Alegrete
- Ribeira de Nisa e Carreiras
- Fortios
- Reguengo e São Julião
- Sé e São Lourenço
- Urra

== Other features ==
The house-museum of José Régio, a famous Portuguese poet, was installed in his home, in which he lived for 34 years. When Régio was accepted at the high school of Mouzinho da Silveira, in Portalegre, this place was a hostel. It was previously an annex of the convent of S. Brás, of which there are still some vestiges, namely the chapel. It served as a headquarters when the peninsular wars were fought, but it was later named Pensão 21.

Régio rented a humble room and, as he needed more space (he collected several works of art, amongst which more than 400 representations of Christ), he would rent more space. So, as time went by, he finally became the only inhabitant of the hostel.

In 1965, he sold his collection to the municipality of Portalegre with the condition of it buying his house, restore it and transform it into a museum. He lived there until he died, in 1969. The museum was opened to public in 1971.

== Town twinning ==
- Vila do Conde, Portugal, 1994
- São Vicente, Cape Verde, 1997
- Salé, Morocco, 1997
- Rio Grande do Norte, Brazil, 2005
- Cáceres, Spain, 2005

== Notable people ==
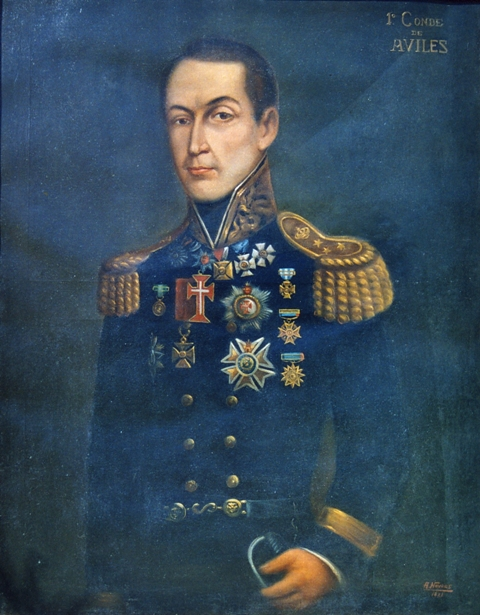
General Jorge Avilez

- Cristóvão Falcão (ca.1512– ca.1557) a poet, from a noble family in Portalegre.
- Jorge de Avilez Zuzarte de Sousa Tavares (1785–1845) a military officer and statesman.
- Beatriz Rente (1858 in Sé – 1907) a Portuguese theatre actor.
- José Régio (1901–1969) a Portuguese writer, lived in Portalegre from 1929 to 1962
- Carlos Canário (1918-1990) a footballer with 197 club caps and 10 for Portugal
- Lucília do Carmo (1919–1998) a famous Portuguese fadista (fado singer)
- Joaquim Miranda (1950–2006) a Portuguese economist, politician and MEP.
- João Luís Carrilho da Graça (born 1952) a Portuguese architect and lecturer.
- Rui Cardoso Martins (born 1967) a Portuguese writer.
- Miguel Praia (born 1978) a retired Portuguese motorcycle racer.

== See also ==
- Portalegre DOC
