= Paulo de Carvalho =

Portuguese singer (born 1947)

Paulo De Carvalho
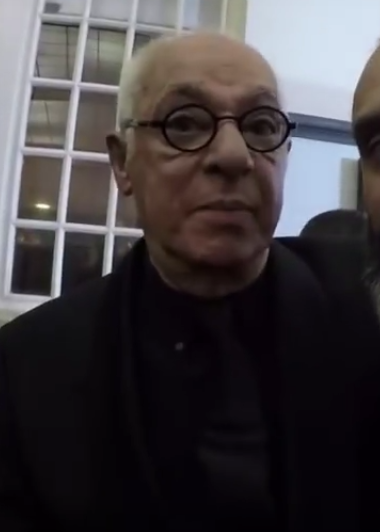
- Carvalho in the XXII Portuguese Golden Globes, in 2017

Background information
- Born: Manuel Paulo de Carvalho da Costa; 15 May 1947 (age 79); Lisbon, Portugal
- Genres: Fado
- Occupation: Singer
- Instruments: Vocals, drums
- Years active: 1965–present
- Website: paulodecarvalho.pt

Paulo de Carvalho (born 15 May 1947) is a Portuguese singer.

== Career ==
Carvalho co-founded the band The Sheiks in 1965. He sang and played the drums. He also played an instrumental role, either as a founder or a guest, of many other important Portuguese bands of the 1960s, among them Fluido, Banda 4 and Thilo's Combo. The Sheiks was Portugal's answer to The Beatles. During the 1960s, Portugal was ruled by an authoritarian dictatorship. This band came as a result of the climate in Portugal and captured the national mood. The people wanted the brightness of the Beatles sound and the Sheiks provided. The band sang songs such as "Summertime", "Missing You" and "Tell Me Bird". Though the band eventually broke up and Carvalho moved into contemporary Fado, the Sheiks have regrouped and performed in recent years.

In 1974, as a solo performer, Carvalho won the Festival RTP da Canção with the song "E Depois do Adeus", which allowed him to represent Portugal in the Eurovision Song Contest 1974. "E Depois do Adeus" was used as the passcode at the beginning of the coup which toppled Portugal's dictatorship (in what has become known as the Carnation Revolution), giving Carvalho a permanent place in his country's history. In 1977, as part of Os Amigos, he won again the Festival RTP da Canção with the song "Portugal no coração", and represented Portugal in the Eurovision Song Contest 1977. Later that year, as a solo artist, he represented Portugal in the OTI Festival 1977 with the song "Amor sem palavras". During the 1970s and early 1980s, Carvalho won many international performance awards in Bulgaria, Poland and Belgium and was a strong participant in other music festivals in Chile, Argentina and Spain.

In 1985, Carvalho began professionally associating himself with Fado, deferring to Portugal's traditional music as globalization came to be seen as a threat to his homeland's cultural heritage; Desculpem qualquer coisinha was his first record following this shift, and (though controversial) remains his most commercially successful venture. Many of Carvalho's songs were written by José Nisa, José Calvário and Ary dos Santos as well as a poem by Alda Lara ("Mãe Negra"). He has worked with Fernando Tordo, Tozé Brito, Carlos Mendes and Os Amigos and performed duets with Brito, Tordo and Dulce Pontes, among others. Several greatest hits albums have been released.

Among his best known songs are:

- "E Depois do Adeus" (1974 Eurovision Song Contest)
- "Flor sem Tempo"
- "Lisboa Menina e Moça"
- "Mãe Negra"
- "Os Meninos do Huambo"
- "Maria Vida Fria"
- "Nini"
- "Olá como estás?" (duet with Tozé Brito)
- "Pomba Branca" (duet with Dulce Pontes)
- "Domingo na praia"

== Personal life ==
Carvalho has been married three times. His first marriage to Teresa Maria Lobato de Faria Sacchetti produced one child, singer Mafalda Sachetti. His second marriage to Helena Isabel produced one child, Bernardo, also a singer known as Agir. His last marriage with Fernanda Borges produced one child Paulo Nuno. He is currently in a partnership with artist Susana Lemos with whom he has two girls.

== Style ==
Carvalho can be described as a new fadisto, singing a contemporary fado, as opposed to the fado of Amália Rodrigues, whose songs were rooted in an older tradition. Carvalho's style fuses contemporary Portuguese pop with some traditional elements of fado. In many cases, his songs mix other Iberian or pan-European traditions, the song "Minh Alma", for example, is more flamenco-pop than fado. This trend is visible throughout his career in fado. Carvalho takes from the wider world of ballads and adds elements of jazz, pop, or whatever else he sees fit into his songs, yet still maintains the result as fado.

== Awards ==
Carvalho was awarded with medal of Ordem da Liberdade by Aníbal Cavaco Silva, President of Portugal, on 10 June 2009.

== Discography ==
- 1969: Paulo de Carvalho;
- 1971: Eu;
- 1975: Não de Costas, Mas de Frente;
- 1976: MPCC;
- 1977: Paulo de Carvalho;
- 1978: Volume 1;
- 1979: Cantar de Amigos;
- 1980: Até me Deva Jeito;
- 1981: Cabra Cega;
- 1982: Cabra Cega;
- 1985: Desculpem Qualquer Coisinha;
- 1986: Homem Portugues;
- 1987: Terras da Lua Cheia;
- 1991: Gostar de Ti;
- 1994: Alma;
- 1995: 33 Vivo;
- 1996: Fados Meus;
- 1999: Mátria;
- 2002: Antologia;
- 2004: Cores do Fado;
- 2006: Vida;
- 2008: Do Amor;
- 2011: Vivo: 50 Anos de Carreira;
- 2012: Duetos de Lisboa;
- 2017: Duetos;

== See also ==
- Portuguese music
- Eurovision Song Contest

Awards and achievements
Preceded by Fernando Tordo with "Tourada"	Portugal in the Eurovision Song Contest; 1974	Succeeded by Duarte Mendes with "Madrugada"
Preceded by Carlos do Carmo with "Uma flor de verde pinho"	Portugal in the Eurovision Song Contest; 1977 (as a part of Os Amigos)	Succeeded by Gemini with "Dai li dou"
Preceded by Paco Bandeira with "Poema de mim"	Portugal in the OTI Festival; 1977	Succeeded by José Cid with "Na cabana junto à praia"
