= Castle of Portalegre =

Portuguese medieval castle

Coordinates: 39°17.472′N 7°25.848′W

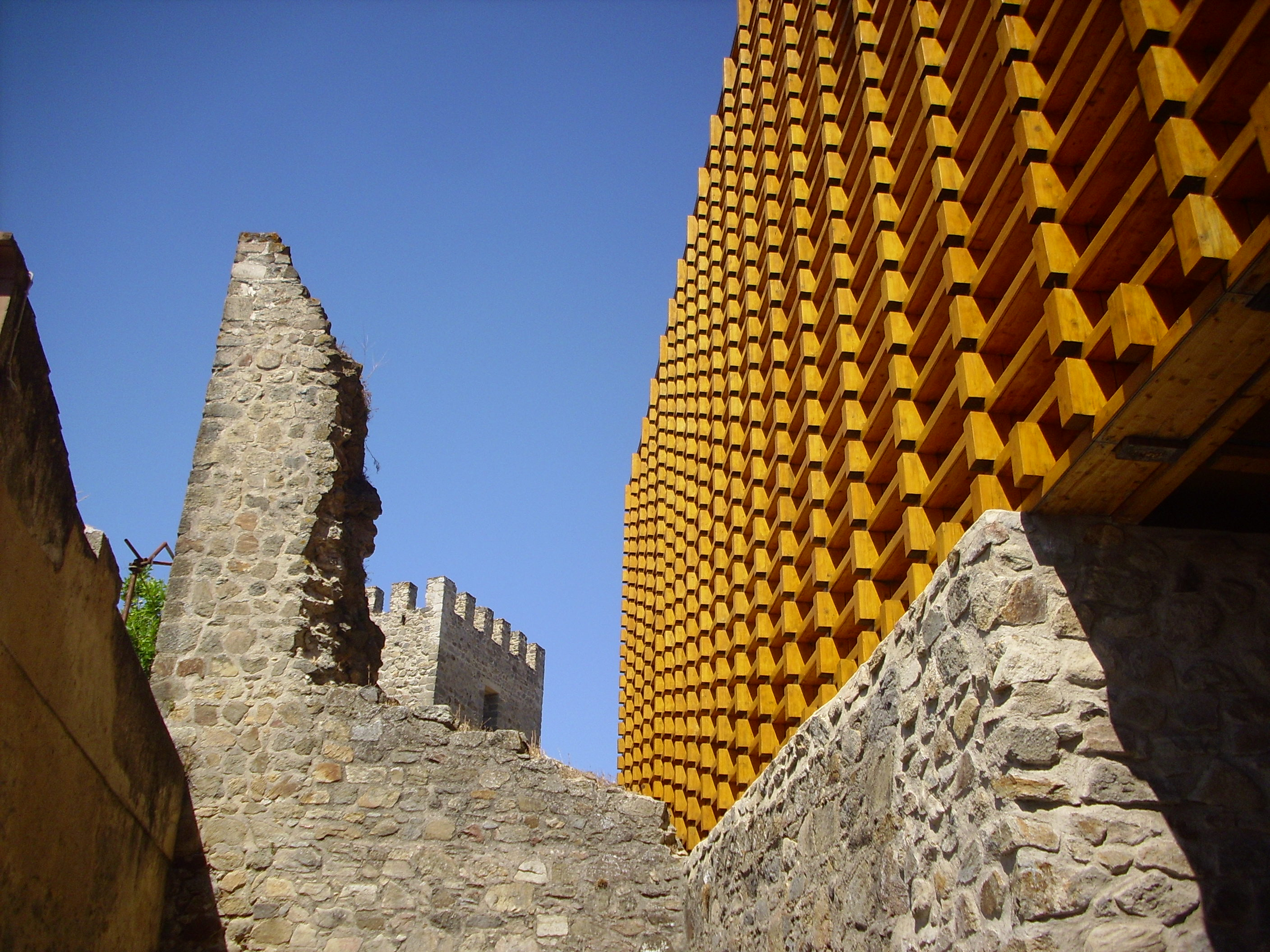
The wall of the castle and the museum

The Castle of Portalegre (Portuguese: Castelo de Portalegre) is a Portuguese medieval castle in the civil parish of Sé e São Lourenço, municipality of Portalegre, district of Portalegre.

It stands out over the older part of the town because of its imposing location over a higher area and because of the contrast between its dark walls and the prevailing whitewashed houses. It served chiefly as a defence of the frontier zone in front of Castile.

== History ==
The earliest historical references date from the reign of Dom Afonso III of Portugal, the king who conceded the first charter to Portalegre in 1259, which gave it the status of vila (town) and made it the capital of a new autonomous municipality.

Starting in 1290, Afonso III's son, the king D. Dinis, reinforced the castle and built the city walls, motivated by the increasing need of defending the frontier and the increased importance of the town.

D. Dinis would attack the fortifications he had ordered to be built in 1299, in the course of a dispute for the ownership of Portalegre between him and his brother Afonso of Portugal, Lord of Portalegre, who also claimed the Portuguese throne.

In the 16th century the city walls and the castle, namely the keep, were reinforced.

In course of the Portuguese Restoration War, the defences of the town were renewed and reinforced again, between 1641 e 1646. They were not effective enough to avoid that the town was occupied in 1704 by French and Spanish troops during the War of the Spanish Succession.

In the Peninsular War there were combats in 1808 against the Napoleonic troops stationed in Portalegre, an event that may have triggered that the French general Louis Henri Loison imposed a heavy tribute to the town.

The castle was listed as a National monument in 1922, but only it was only in the 1960s that any serious restoration works were carried out. In the late 1990s there were more restoration works. In 1999 the Núcleo Museológico do Castelo, a small museum, was founded. It displays weaponry from the 15th century to the World War I.
