= Duarte Mendes =

Portuguese singer

José Henrique Duarte Mendes (born 7 August 1947) is a Portuguese former Army captain and singer. He participated in Festival da Canção, for selecting Portugal's entry for the Eurovision Song Contest, in 1970, 1971, 1972, and 1973 but he did not win until 1975 when he performed "Madrugada" (lyrics and song from José Luís Tinoco), about the Portuguese Overseas War and the 1974's Carnation Revolution.

He represented Portugal in Eurovision Song Contest 1975 with that song. He finished in 16th place with 16 points, including 12 points from Turkey.

== Discography ==
- Então Dizia-te (Single, 1970)
- Adolescente/Dar e Cantar (Single, Philips, 1971)
- Cidade Alheia/Town Without Sun (Single, Orfeu, 1972)
- Gente (EP, Orfeu, 1973) Gente / O Retrato / Maria Vida Fria
- Madrugada (Single, Orfeu, 1975)
- Madrugada (LP, Orfeu, 1975?)

Awards and achievements
Preceded by Paulo de Carvalho with "E depois do adeus"	Portugal in the Eurovision Song Contest; 1975	Succeeded by Carlos do Carmo with "Uma flor de verde pinho"
