= Portugal in the Eurovision Song Contest 1975 =

- Eurovision Song Contest 1975
- Participating broadcaster: Radiotelevisão Portuguesa (RTP)
- Country: Portugal
- Selection process: Grande Prémio TV da Canção Portuguesa 1975
- Selection date: 15 February 1975

Competing entry
- Song: "Madrugada"
- Artist: Duarte Mendes
- Songwriter: José Luís Tinoco

Placement
- Final result: 16th, 16 points

Participation chronology

Portugal was represented at the Eurovision Song Contest 1975 with the song "Madrugada", written by José Luís Tinoco, and performed by Duarte Mendes. The Portuguese participating broadcaster, Radiotelevisão Portuguesa (RTP), selected its entry at the Grande Prémio TV da Canção Portuguesa 1975.

== Before Eurovision ==
=== Grande Prémio TV da Canção Portuguesa 1975 ===
Radiotelevisão Portuguesa (RTP) held the Grande Prémio TV da Canção Portuguesa 1975 at the Teatro Maria Matos in Lisbon on 15 February 1975, hosted by Maria Elisa Domingues and José Nuno Martins. This was the first that the competition did not pass the sieve of the censorship or the Commission of Preliminary Examination, as the regime preferred to designate the censors in the last years of the dictatorship. In 1975, there was a strong revolutionary climate in Portugal, as it was the time of the Processo Revolucionário Em Curso (PREC) (Ongoing Revolutionary Process). For this reason, there was a high amount of political content in the ten songs in the competition. Duarte Mendes, the winner, was himself a captain of April.

For the first time, no public contest for the free submission of songs was held. Instead, RTP, in view of the scarcity of time to open the contest to all composers and also because of the concern to bring some quality to the event (this was the argument used), chose to invite fourteen composers (those who had stood out the most in the last works performed, of these fourteen composers ten accepted to compete, being responsible for the choice of the respective authors of the lyrics and the interpreters). Zeca Afonso and Adriano Correia de Oliveira refused the invitation because they were in Angola, while Fernando Tordo and José Calvário claimed to have nothing ready to compete.

The voting was the responsibility of the authors and composers in the contest who had to award between 1-5 points to the songs other than their own. Thus, the authors of the lyrics of the ten songs took a vote and the composers another and had the right of making a 1-minute declaration of vote.

The transmission of this Festival was also different, so the presentation of the ten songs to the general public was delayed on 14 February at 1 pm on RTP1 and at 9 pm on RTP2 (at the time, not everyone had access to this channel). The next day, Saturday, the recording of the songs was aired again and the voting, live, revealed the decision of the authors and composers.

Grande Prémio TV da Canção Portuguesa - 15 February 1975
R/O	Artist	Song	Conductor	Jury		Votes	Place
R/O	Artist	Song	Conductor	Composers	Authors	Votes	Place
1	Fernando Girão & Jorge Palma	"Pecado (do) capital"	Pedro Osório	16	17	33	7
2	Duarte Mendes	"Madrugada"	Pedro Osório	30	31	61	1
3	Paco Bandeira	"Batalha-povo"	Pedro Osório	21	20	41	6
4	Paulo de Carvalho	"Com uma arma, com uma flor"	José Calvário	27	26	53	3
5	Carlos Cavalheiro	"A boca do lobo"	Pedro Osório	28	31	59	2
6	Fernando Gaspar	"Leilão de lata"	Pedro Jordão	11	11	22	10
7	Victor Leitão	"Canção acesa"	Fernando Correia Martins	17	13	30	9
8	Paulo de Carvalho	"Memória"	José Calvário	26	21	47	4
9	José Mário Branco	"Alerta"	Luís Pedro	21	21	42	5
10	Jorge Palma	"Viagem"	Jorge Palma	17	14	31	8

== At Eurovision ==
On the night of the final Mendes performed 16th in the running order, following Finland and preceding Spain. This year a new scoring system was implemented. Each country would be represented by a jury of 11 members, at least half of whom had to be under the age of 26. Each jury member had to award every song a mark of between 1 and 5 points, but could not vote for their own nation's entry. The votes were cast immediately after the song was performed and collected by the adjudicator straight away. After the last song was performed, the jury secretary added up all the votes cast and awarded 12 points to the song with the highest score, 10 to the second highest score, then 8 to the third, 7 to the fourth, 6 to the fifth and so forth down to 1 point for the song ranked 10th, a points system that remains in use today.

At the close of the voting the song had received 16 points, coming 16th in the field of 19 competing countries. The orchestra during the Portuguese entry was conducted by Pedro Osório.

=== Voting ===
Points awarded to Portugal
Score	Country
12 points	Turkey
10 points	
8 points	
7 points	
6 points	
5 points	
4 points	
3 points	
2 points	France; Spain
1 point	

Points awarded by Portugal
Score	Country
12 points	France
10 points	Italy
8 points	Luxembourg
7 points	Netherlands
6 points	Sweden
5 points	United Kingdom
4 points	Ireland
3 points	Monaco
2 points	Switzerland
1 point	Yugoslavia
