= Carlos do Carmo =

Portuguese fado singer (1939–2021)

ComIH GOM Carlos do Carmo
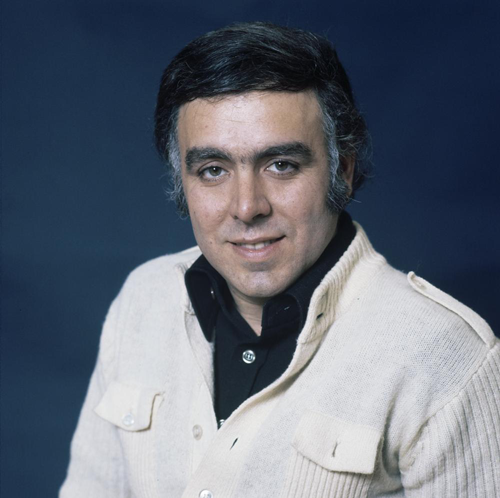
- Carlos do Carmo in 1976

Background information
- Born: Carlos Manuel de Ascenção do Carmo de Almeida; 21 December 1939; Lisbon, Portugal
- Died: 1 January 2021 (aged 81) Lisbon, Portugal
- Genres: Fado
- Occupation: Singer
- Years active: 1964–2020
- Label: Universal Music

Carlos Manuel de Ascenção do Carmo de Almeida ComIH GOM (21 December 1939 – 1 January 2021), better known as Carlos do Carmo, was a Portuguese fado singer.

The son of Lucília do Carmo, a well-known fadista, do Carmo began his career in fado following his father's death in 1962, when he returned from a period in Switzerland to help his mother run the family's fado house. He began singing himself shortly afterwards and, in 1963, he began his career as a recording artist. He continued working at the fado house for a number of years, while also expanding his recording career. He achieved national and international success in the 1970s, including performances at the Royal Opera House in London and the Paris Olympia. He represented Portugal at the Eurovision Song Contest 1976 with his song "Uma flor de verde pinho", finishing in 12th place.

Carmo introduced new styles to fado, including the addition of orchestras, and the incorporation of other styles such as jazz into the traditional music.

== Early life ==
Carlos do Carmo grew up in Lisbon. His mother was Lucília do Carmo, a fado singer who experienced success in the 1920s. He first left Lisbon in his youth, on the advice of his parents, to study languages and hotel management in Switzerland. But, with the death of his father Alfredo de Almeida in 1962, do Carmo soon joined his mother to help her run their fado house, the Faia. Encouraged by his friends' response to his singing, do Carmo soon began to perform at the fado house.

== Career ==
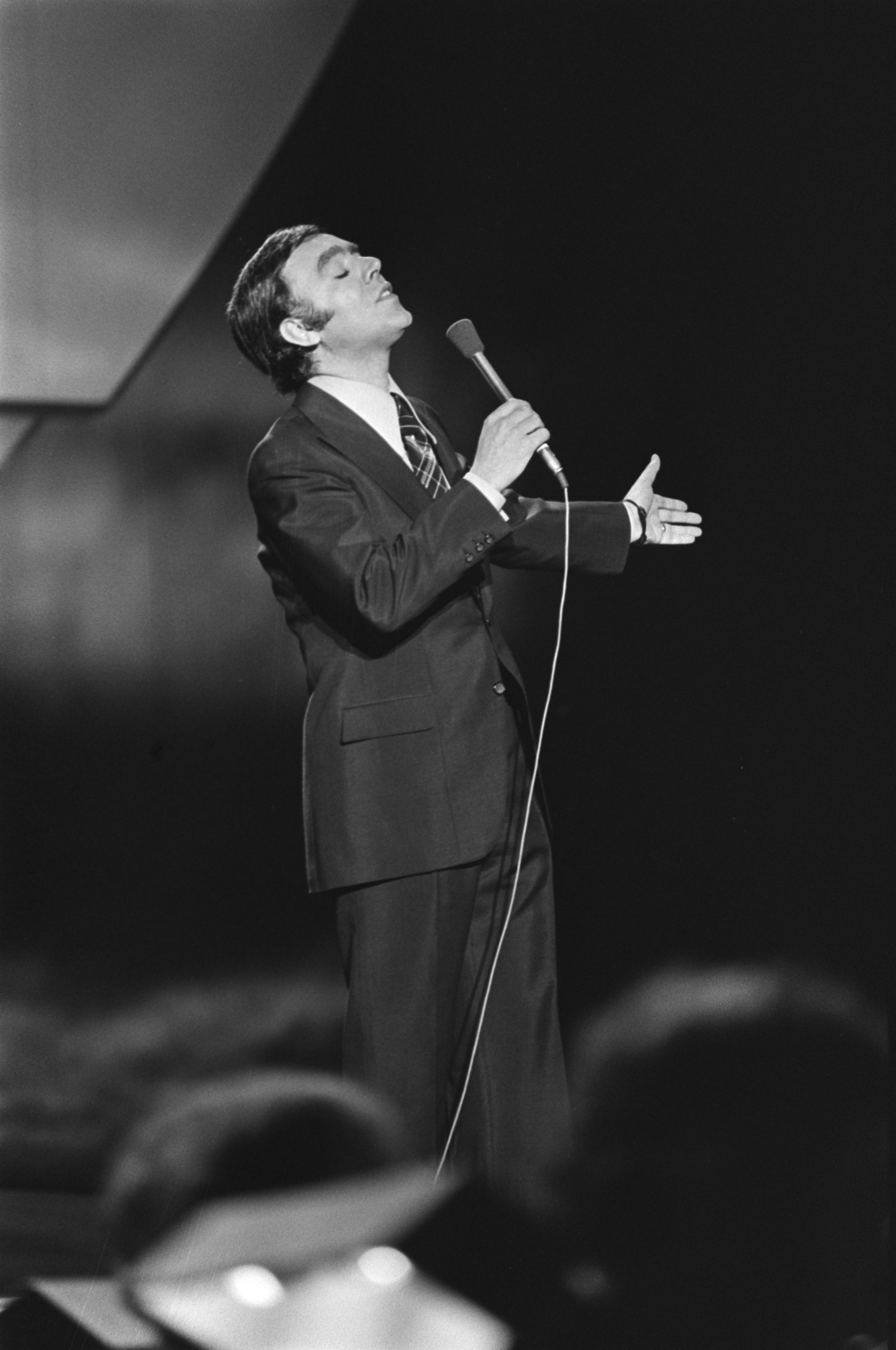
Do Carmo performs at the Eurovision Song Contest 1976.

Do Carmo's career thrived in the 1970s, when he released several of his most well-known songs and collaborated with a number of opponents to the Estado Novo regime, such as Fernando Tordo, Paulo de Carvalho and the poet Ary dos Santos. Following the Carnation Revolution, fado saw its place as the Portuguese national music threatened by the emergence of canção de intervenção, a term encompassing Portuguese protest songs. Fado also started to lose exposure on the radio and on television; according to musicologist Rui Vieira Nery, do Carmo was an exception to this trend, because of his connection to "sectors of the democratic opposition".

In 1976, in the first Festival da Canção after the revolution, the organizers of the contest tried to emulate A Song for Europe's method of national selection for the Eurovision Song Contest. The procedure employed by their British counterparts consisted of choosing a single artist who would perform all the songs in the contest. Do Carmo was chosen as the only singer of that year's Festival da Canção and the winner of the contest was the song "Uma flor de verde pinho". Later that year, he represented his country at the Eurovision Song Contest 1976 with the same song, finishing in 12th place.

In 1977, do Carmo released Um Homem na Cidade (transl. A Man in the City), a concept album featuring an array of poems about Lisbon by Ary dos Santos. The album became one of the greatest successes of do Carmo's long career, and was described by Nery as being "one of the most significant albums in the whole fado discography". Um Homem na Cidade evinced a new, innovative style of fado. Its lyrics, while not necessarily supportive of the revolution, referenced current affairs of the time.

While fado remained at the core of his music, do Carmo was influenced, among other styles and musicians, by Frank Sinatra; French pop, including the work of Jacques Brel; and Brazilian bossa nova, including the work of Elis Regina. (He performed with Regina on a trip to Brazil in 1973.) His uniqueness, apart from the special timbre of his voice, is in his ability to bring composers from other styles such as jazz, as well as adding the orchestra to fado music. This is seen in his albums such as Um Homem na Cidade.

In 1984, he recorded Um Homem no País, which was the first CD ever recorded in Portugal. He worked closely with other fado singers such as Mariza and Camané, and nurtured their development. His career included performances at the Royal Albert Hall, The Town Hall in New York City, Paris Olympia, Frankfurt's Alte Oper, and the Canecão in Rio de Janeiro. His classics include "Bairro alto", ""Lisboa, menina e moça", "Canoas do tejo", "Os putos" and "Por morrer uma andorinha". In 2019, do Carmo announced his retirement from live performances.

== Personal life and death ==
In 1964 he married Maria Judite de Sousa Leal. He had three children.

Carlos do Carmo died on 1 January 2021 at Lisbon's Hospital de Santa Maria, aged 81. He had been admitted to the hospital the previous day after having an aneurysm. A national day of mourning was declared on 4 January.

== Legacy ==
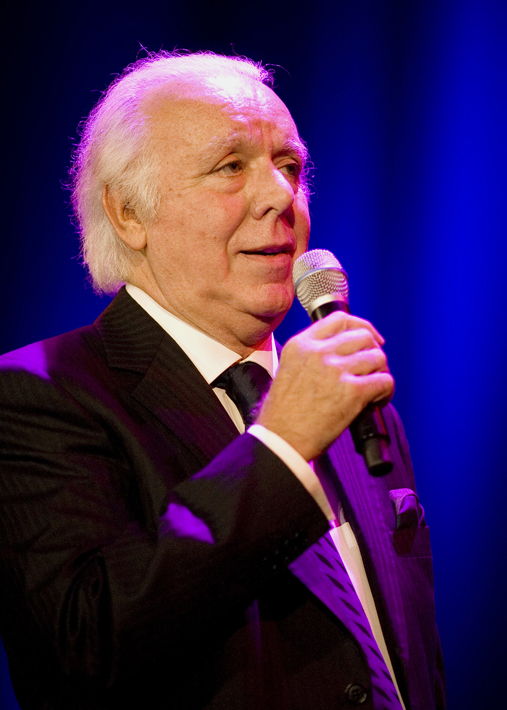
Do Carmo performing in 2007

Carlos do Carmo is considered to be the most important male fadista of his generation, that came after Alfredo Marceneiro and before Camané. He is often regarded as the artist that made the transition between traditional fado and the new fado that started emerging in the 1990s.

== Discography ==
Sources:

- Fado em Tom Maior (1964)
- Não Se Morre de Saudade (1967)
- Fado Lisboa – An Evening at The "Faia" (with Lucília do Carmo, 1969)
- Carlos do Carmo (1970)
- Por Morrer uma Andorinha (1970)
- No Curto-Circuito (1970)
- Canoas do Tejo (1972)
- Uma Canção para a Europa (1973)
- Ao Vivo na Ópera de Frankfurt (Alte Oper Frankfurt) (1983)
- Um Homem na Cidade (1977)
- Dez Fados Vividos (1978)
- Um Homem no País (1983)
- Um Homem no Mundo (1983)
- Mais do Que Amor É Amar (1986)
- Que Se Fez Homem de Cantar (1990)
- Ao Vivo no CCB (1999)
- Margens (1999)
- Nove fados e uma canção de amor (2002)
- Do Tempo do Vinil (2003)
- Ao Vivo – Coliseu dos Recreios – Lisboa (2004)
- A Arte e a Música de Carlos do Carmo (2006)
- À Noite (2007)
- Carlos do Carmo & Bernardo Sassetti (2010)
- Maria João Pires / Carlos do Carmo (with Maria João Pires, 2012)
- Fado É Amor (2013)

== Awards and honors ==
Carlos do Carmo was awarded a Portuguese Golden Globe in 1998 and a Goya Award in 2008. In 2014, he became the first Portuguese artist to win a Latin Grammy Award, being awarded a lifetime achievement award from the Latin Recording Academy. In 1997, he was named a commander of the Order of Prince Henry; in 2016, he became a member of the Order of Merit. In 2019, he received the Medalha de Mérito Cultural.

== Sources ==
- Côrte-Real, Maria de São José (1996). "Sons de Abril: estilos musicais e movimentos de intervenção político-cultural na Revolução de 1974". Revista portuguesa de musicologia (in Portuguese). 6: 141–172.
- Elliott, Richard (2010). "Taking Place: the Role of the City in Fado". Fado and the Place of Longing: Loss, Memory and the City. Farnham, Surrey, England: Ashgate Publishing Limited. pp. 85–86. doi:10.4324/9781315094175. ISBN 978-1138246867.

Awards and achievements
Preceded by Duarte Mendes with "Madrugada"	Portugal in the Eurovision Song Contest; 1976	Succeeded by Os Amigos with "Portugal no coração"
