= De troubadour =

1969 song by Lenny Kuhr

Single by Lenny Kuhr

from the album Lenny Kuhr
- Language: Dutch
- B-side: "Mais non, Monsieur"
- Released: 1969
- Genre: Folk
- Length: 3:26
- Label: Philips
- Composer: David Hartsema
- Lyricist: Lenny Kuhr

Eurovision Song Contest 1969 entry
- Country: Netherlands
- Artist: Lenny Kuhr
- Language: Dutch
- Composer: David Hartsema
- Lyricist: Lenny Kuhr
- Conductor: Frans de Kok

Finals performance
- Final result: 1st
- Final points: 18

Entry chronology
- ◄ "Morgen" (1968)
- "Waterman" (1970) ►

Official performance video
- "De troubadour" on YouTube

"De troubadour" ("The troubadour"), is a song recorded by Dutch singer Lenny Kuhr, with music composed by David Hartsema and lyrics by Kuhr herself. It represented the Netherlands in the Eurovision Song Contest 1969, held in Madrid, and became one of the four winning songs.

Kuhr recorded the song in six languages: Dutch, English, French, German, Spanish, and Italian.

== Background ==
=== Conception ===
"De troubadour" music was written by David Hartsema and lyrics by Lenny Kuhr. It is a ballad inspired both musically and lyrically by folk-song traditions. It is about a troubadour of the Middle Ages, describing the impact the music has on his audiences.

=== Eurovision ===
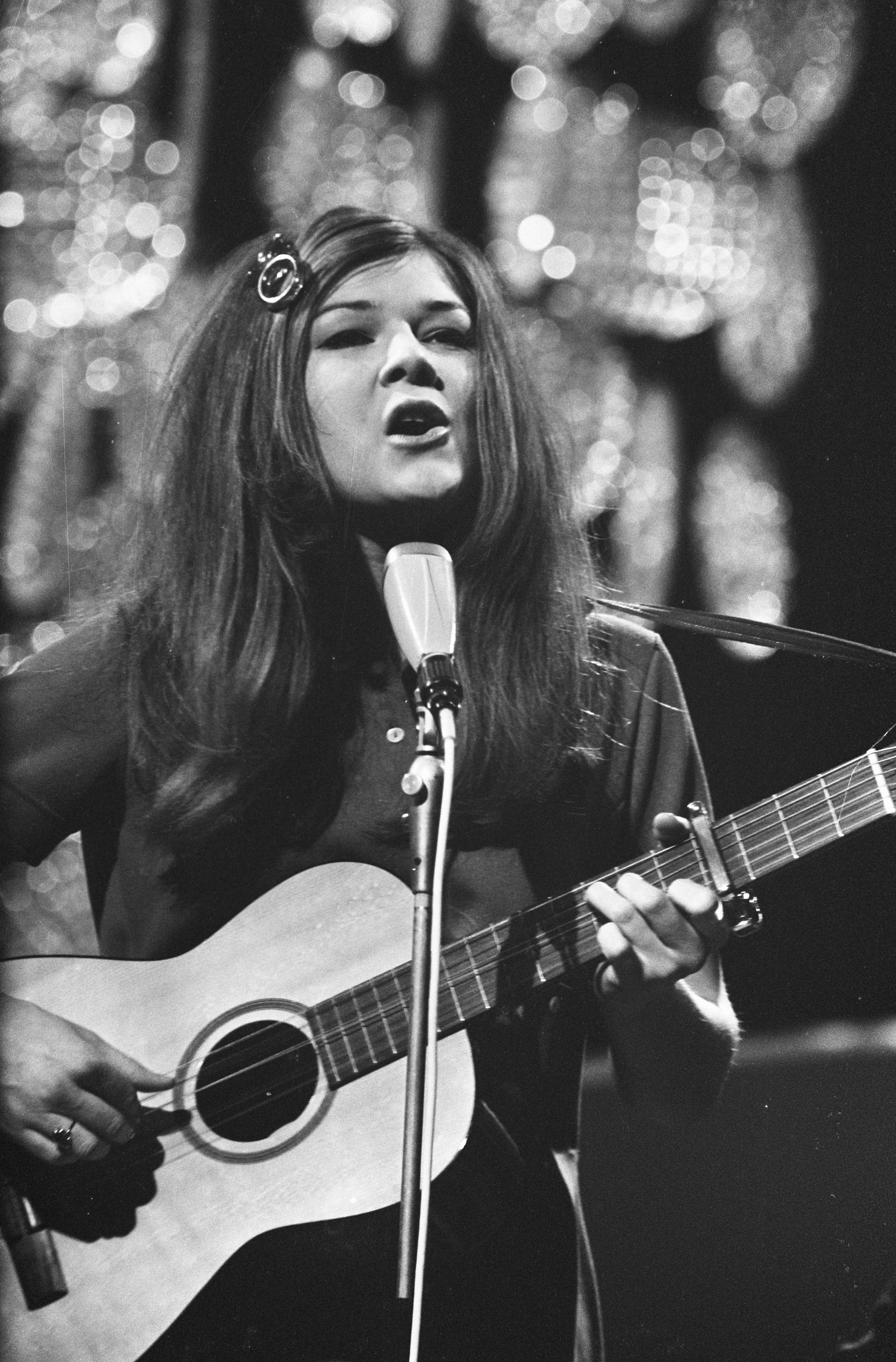
Kuhr at the Nationaal Songfestival.

On 26 February 1969, "De troubadour" performed by Lenny Kuhr competed in the 13th edition of the Nationaal Songfestival, the national final organized by the Nederlandse Televisie Stichting (NTS) to select their song and performer for the 14th edition of the Eurovision Song Contest. The song won the competition so it became the Dutch entry for the contest.

Kuhr recorded the song in Dutch, English –as "The Troubadour"–, French –"Le troubadour"–, German –"Der Troubadour"–, Italian –"Un cantastorie"–, and Spanish –"El trovador"–.

On 29 March 1969, the Eurovision Song Contest was held at the Teatro Real in Madrid hosted by Televisión Española (TVE), and broadcast live throughout the continent. Kuhr performed "De troubadour" eighth on the night, following United Kingdom's "Boom Bang-a-Bang" by Lulu and preceding Sweden's "Judy, min vän" by Tommy Körberg. Frans de Kok conducted the live orchestra in the performance of the Dutch entry.

At the close of voting, the song had received 18 points, the same number of points as Spain's "Vivo cantando" by Salomé, the France's "Un jour, un enfant" by Frida Boccara, and the United Kingdom's "Boom Bang-a-Bang" by Lulu. As there was no tiebreaker rule in place at the time, all four countries were declared joint winners. Since the Dutch entry in 1968 was joint last, the Netherlands thus achieved the rare feat of going from (equal) last to (equal) first in the space of one year.

=== Aftermath ===
"De troubadour" was included in Kuhr's studio album Lenny Kuhr. Five years after the Contest, she recorded the song with revised Dutch lyrics, then retitled "De generaal" ("The general"), which was a homage to the Dutch national soccer coach Rinus Michels, who was nicknamed so by the players of the Dutch team.

Kuhr performed her song in the Eurovision twenty-fifth anniversary show Songs of Europe held on 22 August 1981 in Mysen. On 22 May 2021, the interval act "Rock the Roof" in the Eurovision Song Contest 2021 grand final featured "De troubadour" performed by Kuhr in the same dress she wore in her Eurovision winning performance fifty-two years earlier.

| Preceded by "La, la, la" by Massiel | Eurovision Song Contest winners co-winner with "Un jour, un enfant" by Frida Boccara, "Vivo cantando" by Salomé and "Boom Bang-a-Bang" by Lulu; 1969 | Succeeded by "All Kinds of Everything" by Dana |
