= Boom Bang-a-Bang =

1969 song by Lulu, joint Eurovision winner

Single by Lulu
- B-side: "March!"
- Released: 1969
- Genre: Europop; schlager
- Length: 2:22
- Label: EMI; Columbia
- Composer: Alan Moorhouse
- Lyricist: Peter Warne

Eurovision Song Contest 1969 entry
- Country: United Kingdom
- Artist: Lulu
- Language: English
- Composer: Alan Moorhouse
- Lyricist: Peter Warne
- Conductor: Johnny Harris

Finals performance
- Final result: 1st
- Final points: 18

Entry chronology
- ◄ "Congratulations" (1968)
- "Knock, Knock Who's There?" (1970) ►

Official performance video
- "Boom Bang-a-Bang" on YouTube

"Boom Bang-a-Bang" is a song recorded by Scottish singer Lulu, with music composed by Alan Moorhouse and lyrics by Peter Warne. It represented the United Kingdom in the Eurovision Song Contest 1969, held in Madrid, and became one of the four winning songs. It made No. 2 in the UK Singles Chart and was a major hit throughout Europe.

== Background ==
=== Conception ===
"Boom Bang-a-Bang" was written by composer Alan Moorhouse and lyricist Peter Warne. Lyrically, the song is a plea from the singer to her lover to "cuddle me tight". She then goes on to explain that "my heart goes boom bang-a-bang boom bang-a-bang when you are near", complete with appropriate musical accompaniment.

=== Eurovision ===
On 22 February 1969, "Boom Bang-a-Bang" performed by Lulu competed in the national final organized by the British Broadcasting Corporation (BBC) to select the song she –who had already been internally selected– would perform in the 14th edition of the Eurovision Song Contest. The song won the competition so it became the British entry for the contest. Lulu recorded the song with the same title in five languages: English, French, German, Spanish, and Italian.

On 29 March 1969, the Eurovision Song Contest was held at the Teatro Real in Madrid hosted by Televisión Española (TVE), and broadcast live throughout the continent. Lulu performed "Boom Bang-a-Bang" seventh on the night, following Italy's "Due grosse lacrime bianche" by Iva Zanicchi and preceding Netherlands's "De troubadour" by Lenny Kuhr. Johnny Harris conducted the live orchestra in the performance of the British entry.

At the close of voting, the song had received 18 points, the same number of points as Spain's "Vivo cantando" by Salomé, the France's "Un jour, un enfant" by Frida Boccara, and the Netherlands's "De troubadour" by Lenny Kuhr. As there was no tiebreaker rule in place at the time, all four countries were declared joint winners.

=== Aftermath ===
Lulu performed her song in the Eurovision twenty-fifth anniversary show Songs of Europe held on 22 August 1981 in Mysen. The BBC included the song on a blacklist of banned songs issued during the 1991 Gulf War. The song is the end theme tune for the BBC Three 2010 sitcom Him & Her.

Boom Bang-A-Bang was also the name of a 2006 BBC One 1-hour programme made to celebrate the fifty years of the Eurovision Song Contest. Broadcast during that year's Eurovision week, the special was hosted by Terry Wogan and featured archive footage and highlights of past contests, along with a performance of "Teenage Life", that year's British entry by Daz Sampson.

== Chart history ==
=== Weekly charts ===
Chart (1969)	Peak position
Australia (Kent Music Report)	15
Austria (Ö3 Austria Top 40)	10
Belgium (Ultratop 50 Flanders)	4
Denmark (Hitlisten)	9
Finland (Official Finnish Charts)	10
Ireland (IRMA)	1
Netherlands (Dutch Top 40)	19
Netherlands (Single Top 100)	19
New Zealand (RIANZ)	5
Norway (VG-lista)	1
Spain (Promusicae)	5
Switzerland (Schweizer Hitparade)	3
UK Singles (OCC)	2
West Germany (Musikmarkt)	8

Preceded by "La, La, La" by Massiel	Eurovision Song Contest winners co-winner with "Un jour, un enfant" by Frida Boccara, "De troubadour" by Lenny Kuhr and "Vivo cantando" by Salomé; 1969	Succeeded by "All Kinds of Everything" by Dana
Preceded by "Congratulations" by Cliff Richard	United Kingdom in the Eurovision Song Contest; 1969	Succeeded by "Knock, Knock Who's There?" by Mary Hopkin
