= Belgium in the Eurovision Song Contest 1969 =

- Eurovision Song Contest 1969
- Participating broadcaster: Belgische Radio- en Televisieomroep (BRT)
- Country: Belgium
- Selection process: Artist: Internal selection Song: Nationale Finale Eurovisiesongfestival
- Selection date: Artist: December 1968; Song: 22 February 1969

Competing entry
- Song: "Jennifer Jennings"
- Artist: Louis Neefs
- Songwriters: Paul Quintens; Phil van Cauwenbergh

Placement
- Final result: 7th, 10 points

Participation chronology

Belgium was represented at the Eurovision Song Contest 1969 with the song "Jennifer Jennings", composed by Paul Quintens, with lyrics by Phil van Cauwenbergh, and performed by Louis Neefs. The Belgian participating broadcaster, Dutch-speaking Belgische Radio- en Televisieomroep (BRT), selected its entry through a national final, after having previously selected the performer internally. Neefs had previously represented Belgium in 1967.

== Before Eurovision ==
=== Artist selection ===
In December 1968, BRT announced that they had internally selected Louis Neefs to represent Belgium in the Eurovision Song Contest 1969.

=== Nationale Finale Eurovisiesongfestival ===
Nationale Finale Eurovisiesongfestival was the national final format developed by BRT in order to select the Belgian entry for the Eurovision Song Contest 1969.

==== Competing entries ====
Following the announcement of Neefs as Belgian representative, a song submission period was opened where composers were able to submit their songs until 24 January 1969. 127 songs were received by the broadcaster at the end of the deadline, and on 28 January 1969, six were selected for the national final.

==== Final ====
The final was held on 22 February 1969 from 9:05 to 10:00 CET at the Amerikaans Theater in Brussels and was hosted by Jan Theys. Six songs competed in the contest, with the winner being decided upon by a 7-member jury panel who each chose their favourite song. In addition to the performances of the competing entries, guest performers included Barry Ryan and Noëlle Cordier.

Final – 22 February 1969
R/O	Song	Songwriter(s)		Points	Place
R/O	Song	Composer(s)	Lyricist(s)	Points	Place
1	"Dans mooie vlinder"	André Van Steyvoort	Ke Riema	0	2
2	"Vanessa, I Love You"	Paul Quintens	Phil van Cauwenbergh	0	2
3	"In elke lente"	Jean Evans; Frans Van Dyck	Jan Marcken	0	2
4	"Regenweer, regenweer"	Eddy Van Mouffaert		0	2
5	"Zo wondermooi"	Hans Flower	Co Flower	0	2
6	"Jennifer Jennings"	Paul Quintens	Phil van Cauwenbergh	7	1

== At Eurovision ==
On the night of the final Neefs performed 10th in the running order, following Sweden and preceding Switzerland. Neefs is remembered for his quirky performance, which involved throwing his arms in the air in an apparently random manner. At the close of the voting "Jennifer Jennings" had received 10 points (3 from the United Kingdom, 2 from Norway, Spain, and Switzerland and 1 from the Netherlands), placing Belgium joint 7th (with Ireland) of the 16 competing entries. The result matched Neefs' 7th place in 1967. The Belgian jury awarded its highest mark (3) to joint contest winners Spain.

=== Voting ===
Points awarded to Belgium
Score	Country
3 points	United Kingdom
2 points	Norway; Spain; Switzerland
1 point	Netherlands

Points awarded by Belgium
Score	Country
3 points	Spain
1 point	Germany; Luxembourg; Monaco; Netherlands; Portugal; Switzerland; Yugoslavia
