= Switzerland in the Eurovision Song Contest 1969 =

- Eurovision Song Contest 1969
- Participating broadcaster: Swiss Broadcasting Corporation (SRG SSR)
- Country: Switzerland
- Selection process: Internal selection
- Announcement date: 18 January 1969

Competing entry
- Song: "Bonjour, Bonjour"
- Artist: Paola del Medico
- Songwriters: Henry Meyer; Jack Stark

Placement
- Final result: 5th, 13 votes

Participation chronology

Switzerland was represented at the Eurovision Song Contest 1969 with the song "Bonjour, Bonjour", composed by Henry Meyer, with lyrics by Jack Stark, and performed by Paola del Medico. The Swiss participating broadcaster, the Swiss Broadcasting Corporation (SRG SSR), internally selected its entry for the contest.

== Before Eurovision ==
=== Internal selection ===
Unlike in most previous years, the Swiss Broadcasting Corporation (SRG SSR) held an internal selection to select their entry for Eurovision rather than a televised national final. This was due to the contest regulations set by the European Broadcasting Union, in which songs were not allowed to be released or otherwise published before 3 March and the Swiss broadcaster viewed the criticism of their national selections as "premature and tactically incorrect."

The internal selection took place from 4-17 January in two rounds. A total of 36 songs were submitted and presented, all of which required songwriters of Swiss citizenship. In the first round which took place in Lugano, two songs were shortlisted by jurors from Televisione svizzera di lingua italiana (TSI); "Bonjour, Bonjour" by Paola del Medico and "Mon clown à moi" by Jacqueline Midinette.

The final round took place on 17 January in Bern, where test video recordings of both songs were presented to jurors from the three regional SRG SSR studios. In the events of a tiebreaker, the artist who had the most Swiss citizenship would be selected. The following day, it was first reported the internal jury selected "Bonjour, Bonjour" performed by Paola del Medico, and composed by Henry Meyer, with lyrics by Jack Stark. From 5-10 March, Jacqueline Midinette competed in the 1969 Golden Stag Festival with her song "Mon clown à moi".

Internal selection final stage – 17 January 1969
Artist	Song	Language	Songwriter(s)		Place
Artist	Song	Language	Composer	Lyricist	Place
Paola del Medico	"Bonjour, Bonjour"	German	Henry Meyer	Jack Stark	1
Jacqueline Midinette	"Mon clown à moi"	French	Jacqueline Midinette		2

=== Releases ===
"Bonjour, Bonjour" by Paola del Medico was first recorded and released on a single under the same title in 1969. The song was also released in singles in French, Italian, and Spanish that same year. In 1998, the song was featured in a CD compilation titled "Concours Eurovision De La Chanson 1956-1998: Schweizer Beiträge", which compiled every Swiss Eurovision entry at the time.

Jacqueline Midinette would also record and release "Mon clown à moi", which appeared on a single and EP both named after the song in that same year.

== At Eurovision ==
Paola del Medico (pictured in 1968) represented Switzerland in the Eurovision Song Contest 1969

At the Eurovision Song Contest 1969 in Madrid, the Swiss entry was the eleventh song of the night following Belgium and preceding Norway. It was conducted by Henry Meyer. At the close of voting, Switzerland had received 13 votes and finished fifth among the seventeen participants.

The contest was broadcast on SRG SSR via TV DRS in German-speaking Switzerland, TSR (with commentary from Georges Hardy) in Romandy, and TSI in Ticino.

=== Voting ===
Each participating broadcaster assembled a ten-member jury panel. Every jury member could give one point to their favourite song.

Points awarded to Switzerland
Score	Country
3 points	Ireland
2 points	Finland; Germany; United Kingdom; Yugoslavia
1 point	Belgium; Norway

Points awarded by Switzerland
Score	Country
4 points	Netherlands
3 points	Ireland
2 points	Belgium
1 point	France
