= Desfolhada portuguesa =

1969 song by Simone de Oliveira

Single by Simone de Oliveira
- Language: Portuguese
- Released: 1969
- Label: Decca
- Composer: Nuno Nazareth Fernandes
- Lyricist: Ary dos Santos

Eurovision Song Contest 1969 entry
- Country: Portugal
- Artist: Simone de Oliveira
- Language: Portuguese
- Composer: Nuno Nazareth Fernandes
- Lyricist: Ary dos Santos
- Conductor: Ferrer Trindade

Finals performance
- Final result: 15th
- Final points: 4

Entry chronology
- ◄ "Verão" (1968)
- "Menina do alto da serra" (1971) ►

"Desfolhada portuguesa" ("Portuguese husking"), or simply "Desfolhada", is a song recorded by Portuguese singer Simone de Oliveira with music composed by Nuno Nazareth Fernandes and Portuguese lyrics written by Ary dos Santos. It represented Portugal in the Eurovision Song Contest 1969 held in Madrid, having previously won that year's Grande Prémio TV da Canção Portuguesa.

== Conception ==
"Desfolhada portuguesa" was composed by Nuno Nazareth Fernandes with Portuguese lyrics by Ary dos Santos. It deals with the love of Portugal – the first occasion on which this was the theme of the Portuguese entry, but far from the last. The song compares the love from the conception of a child to patriotic love. The lyrics contain the verse "quem faz um filho, fá-lo por gosto" (transl. "whoever fathers a child, does it out of pleasure"), controversial at that time, which the régime censorship was not able to avoid on time.

== Eurovision Song Contest 1969 ==
On 24 February 1969, "Desfolhada portuguesa" performed by Simone de Oliveira competed in the 6th edition of the Grande Prémio TV da Canção Portuguesa. It received 92 points, winning the competition. As the festival was used by Radiotelevisão Portuguesa (RTP) to select their song and performer for the 14th edition of the Eurovision Song Contest, the song became the Portuguese entrant, and de Oliveira the performer, for Eurovision. Initially, she was not going to be the performer of the song, as it was intended for Elisa Lisboa, who withdrew a few days before the national final.

In addition to the Portuguese original version, de Oliveira recorded the song in Spanish –as "Deshojada"–, French –as "Terre guitare"–, and Italian. On her train journey to Madrid to participate in Eurovision, thousands of people waved to her along the railway displaying placards of support. The train made an exceptional stop at the Marvão railway station, so that people would greet her just before the train left Portugal.

On 29 March 1969, the Eurovision Song Contest was held at the Teatro Real in Madrid hosted by Televisión Española (TVE), and broadcast live throughout the continent. De Oliveira, accompanied by two baking singers –Maria Alexandre de Brito and Natália Rodrigues de Matos– and a guitarist –António Luís Gomes–, performed "Desfolhada portuguesa" fifteenth on the evening, following France's "Un jour, un enfant" by Frida Boccara and preceding Finland's "Kuin silloin ennen" by Jarkko & Laura. Ferrer Trindade conducted the event's live orchestra in the performance of the Portuguese entry. The song was introduced in the contest as "Deshojada", with TVE showing its Spanish title onscreen, because domestically the word desfolhada is similar to the obscene word follada.

At the close of voting, the song had received 4 points, placing fifteenth in a field of sixteen.

=== Aftermath ===
Despite the poor placing, when de Oliveira returned by train from Madrid to Lisbon, she was received at the Santa Apolónia railway station with the biggest demonstration ever given to a singer by the Portuguese people, even at a time when demonstrations were prohibited. The régime was unable to stop the strength of the people who decided to pay tribute to their representative at Eurovision and sang "Desfolhada portuguesa" in unison.

Portugal opted out of the 1970 contest, as one of the several countries to withdraw after the chaotic 1969 result where four songs tied for first place. Its entry, however, had been selected at the time the withdrawal was made, so the country would have been represented by "Onde vais rio que eu canto" by Sérgio Borges. Following the return to the traditional set-up in 1970, Portugal returned to the contest. Thus, the song was succeeded as Portuguese entry at the 1971 contest by "Menina do alto da serra" by Tonicha.

On 4 March 2010, de Oliveira performed "Desfolhada portuguesa" as one of the interval acts of the second semi-final of the Festival da Canção 2010, wearing the same dress she wore at Eurovision. On 4 March 2018, de Oliveira was honored at the grand final of the Festival da Canção 2018, with Aurea performing "Sol de inverno", Marisa Liz performing "Apenas o meu povo", and de Oliveira herself performing "Desfolhada portuguesa", three of her entrants at the Festival.
