= Eurovision Song Contest 1969 =

International song competition

Coordinates: 40°25′06″N 3°42′37″W

Date and venue
- Final: 29 March 1969
- Venue: Teatro Real; Madrid, Spain

Organisation
- Organiser: European Broadcasting Union (EBU)
- Scrutineer: Clifford Brown

Production
- Host broadcaster: Televisión Española (TVE)
- Director: Ramón Díez
- Musical director: Augusto Algueró
- Presenter: Laurita Valenzuela

Participants
- Number of entries: 16
- Non-returning countries: Austria
- Participation map: Competing countries Countries that participated in the past but not in 1969

Vote
- Voting system: Ten-member juries in each country; each member gave one vote to their favourite song
- Winning song: Spain; "Vivo cantando"; United Kingdom; "Boom Bang-a-Bang"; Netherlands; "De troubadour"; France; "Un jour, un enfant"

The Eurovision Song Contest 1969 was the 14th edition of the Eurovision Song Contest, held on 29 March 1969 at the Teatro Real in Madrid, Spain, and presented by Laurita Valenzuela. It was organised by the European Broadcasting Union (EBU) and host broadcaster Televisión Española (TVE), who staged the event after winning the 1968 contest for Spain with the song "La La La" by Massiel.

Broadcasters from a total of sixteen countries took part in the contest, with Austria being the only absence from the seventeen that participated the previous year.

At the close of voting, four entries had received the same number of votes, and were therefore declared joint-winners: Spain with "Vivo cantando" performed by Salomé, the United Kingdom with "Boom Bang-a-Bang" by Lulu, the Netherlands with "De troubadour" by Lenny Kuhr, and France with "Un jour, un enfant" by Frida Boccara. It was the first time in the history of the contest that a tie for first place had occurred, and since the rules in place at the time allowed more than one winner, all four were declared joint winners. France's win was its fourth, thus making it the first country to win the contest four times. The Netherlands' win was its third. Spain and the United Kingdom each won for the second time, with Spain becoming the first country to win the contest twice in a row.

== Location ==
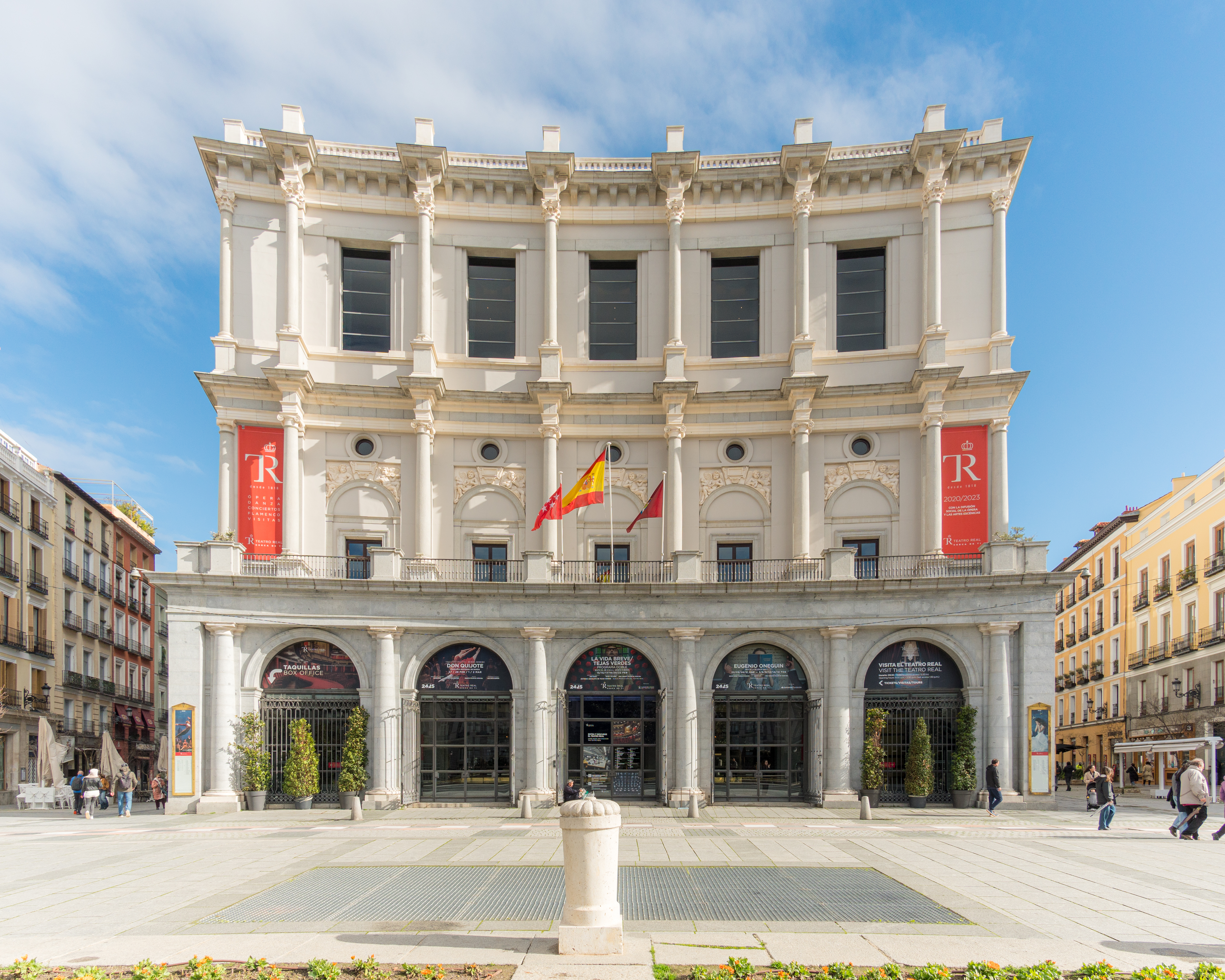
Teatro Real, Madrid – host venue of the 1969 contest.

Televisión Española (TVE) staged the 1969 contest in Madrid, after winning the 1968 contest for Spain with the song "La La La" by Massiel. This is the only time that the contest has been held in Spain. The venue selected was the Teatro Real, an opera house opened in 1850. After having to close in 1924 due to damage to the building, the venue reopened in 1966 as a concert hall and the main concert venue of the Spanish National Orchestra and the RTVE Symphony Orchestra. At that time, it also housed the Madrid Royal Conservatory and the Royal Higher College of Performing Arts.

The press room set up for the event, equipped with a colour Eidophor projector and a giant screen, twelve television monitors, telex, teletype, and telefax machines, telephones, one hundred typewriters with different keyboards, translation services, and a radio studio, was located within the building and had capacity for six hundred journalists.

On 27 March 1969, the Club Internacional de Prensa hosted a cocktail reception at its Madrid facilities, presided over by Manuel Fraga, the Minister of Information and Tourism on whom TVE depended at the time, and attended by all the participating artists, executives from the participating broadcasters, numerous accredited journalists, and local authorities.

== Participants ==
Eurovision Song Contest 1969 – Participation summaries by country
- Belgium; Finland; France; Germany; Ireland; Italy; Luxembourg; Monaco; Netherlands; Norway; Portugal; Spain; Sweden; Switzerland; United Kingdom; Yugoslavia

Broadcasters from sixteen countries participated in the 1969 contest. Of the seventeen countries that participated in 1968 only Austria was absent, officially because Österreichischer Rundfunk (ORF) could not find a suitable representative, but it was rumoured that the broadcaster refused to participate in a contest staged in Franco-ruled Spain.

Several of the performing artists had previously represented the same country in past editions: Simone de Oliveira had represented Portugal in 1965; Kirsti Sparboe had represented Norway in 1965 and in 1967; and Louis Neefs had represented Belgium in 1967. In addition, Siw Malmkvist representing Germany had represented Sweden in 1960; and Romuald representing Luxembourg had represented Monaco in 1964.

Eurovision Song Contest 1969 participants
Country	Broadcaster	Artist	Song	Language	Songwriter(s)	Conductor
Belgium	BRT	Louis Neefs	"Jennifer Jennings"	Dutch	Paul Quintens; Phil Van Cauwenbergh	Francis Bay
Finland	YLE	Jarkko and Laura	"Kuin silloin ennen"	Finnish	Toivo Kärki; Juha Vainio	Ossi Runne
France	ORTF	Frida Boccara	"Un jour, un enfant"	French	Eddy Marnay; Émile Stern	Franck Pourcel
Germany	HR (Note: On behalf of the German public broadcasting consortium ARD)	Siw Malmkvist	"Primaballerina"	German	Hans Blum	Hans Blum
Ireland	RTÉ	Muriel Day	"The Wages of Love"	English	Michael Reade	Noel Kelehan
Italy	RAI	Iva Zanicchi	"Due grosse lacrime bianche"	Italian	Claudio Daiano; Piero Soffici	Ezio Leoni
Luxembourg	CLT	Romuald	"Catherine"	French	André Borly; Paul Mauriat; André Pascal	Augusto Algueró
Monaco	TMC	Jean-Jacques	"Maman, Maman"	French	Jo Perrier	Hervé Roy
Netherlands	NTS	Lenny Kuhr	"De troubadour"	Dutch	David Hartsema; Lenny Kuhr	Frans de Kok
Norway	NRK	Kirsti Sparboe	"Oj, oj, oj, så glad jeg skal bli"	Norwegian	Arne Bendiksen	Øivind Bergh
Portugal	RTP	Simone de Oliveira	"Desfolhada portuguesa"	Portuguese	Nuno Nazareth Fernandes; José Carlos Ary dos Santos	Ferrer Trindade
Spain	TVE	Salomé	"Vivo cantando"	Spanish	Aniano Alcalde; María José de Cerato	Augusto Algueró
Sweden	SR	Tommy Körberg	"Judy, min vän"	Swedish	Britt Lindeborg; Roger Wallis	Lars Samuelson
Switzerland	SRG SSR	Paola	"Bonjour, Bonjour"	German	Henry Mayer; Jack Stark	Henry Mayer
United Kingdom	BBC	Lulu	"Boom Bang-a-Bang"	English	Alan Moorhouse; Peter Warne	Johnny Harris
Yugoslavia	JRT	Ivan	"Pozdrav svijetu" (Поздрав свијету)	Serbo-Croatian	Milan Lentić	Miljenko Prohaska

== Production and format ==
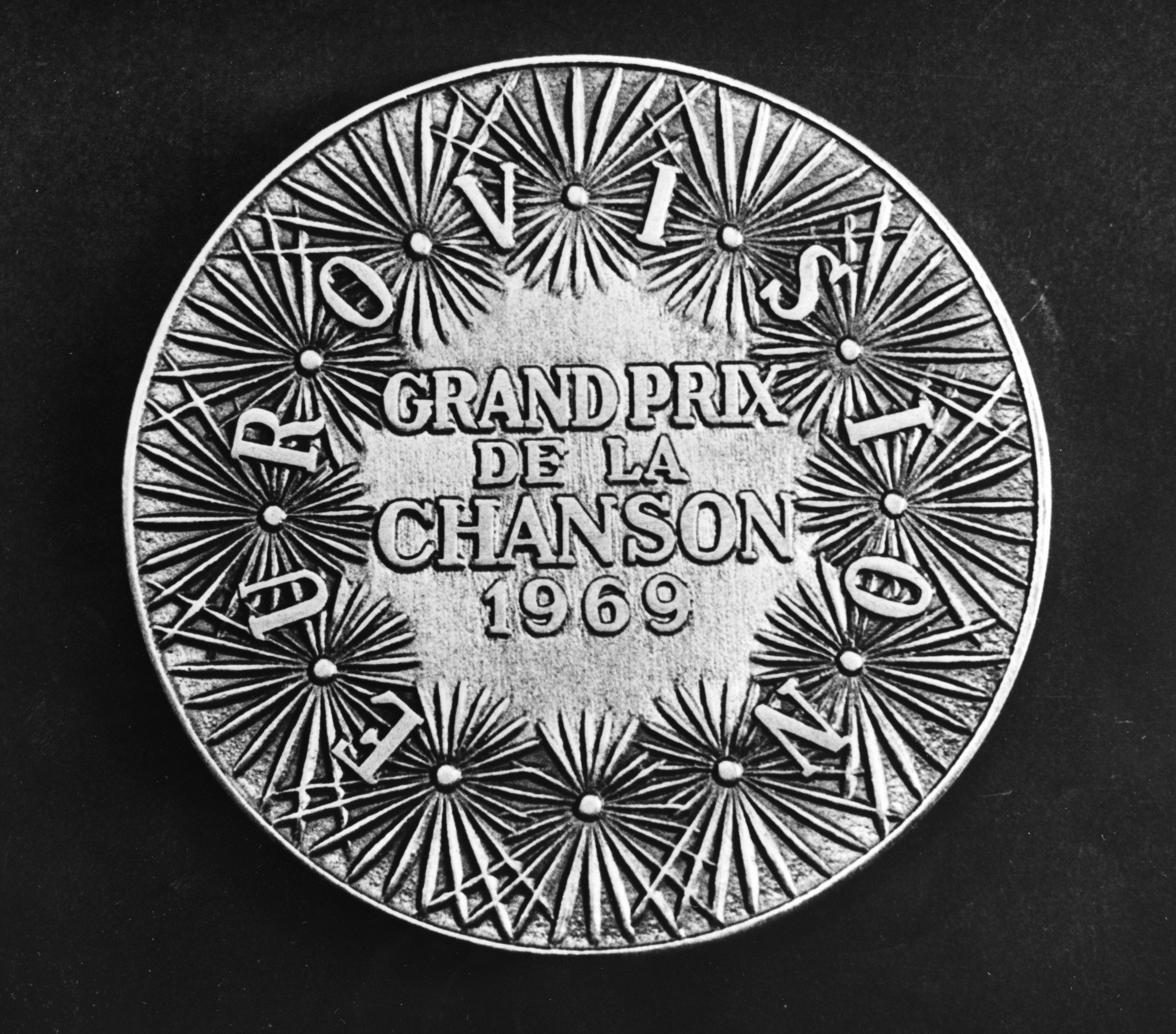
Eurovision Song Contest 1969 winner's medallion. (Note: The medallions the winners received were made of silver by a jeweler in Barcelona, measured 10 centimetres (3.9 in) in diameter and weighed 370 grams (13 oz).)

The event was presented by Laurita Valenzuela, who was dressed for the occasion by Carmen Mir. The surrealist artist Salvador Dalí designed the poster for the contest. The musical director was Augusto Algueró, who made the arrangements and conducted the 52-piece orchestra during the opening and ending acts. Each competing delegation was allowed to appoint its own conductor to lead the orchestra in the performance of its entry, with the host musical director also conducting for those which did not bring their own conductor. The event was overseen on behalf of the European Broadcasting Union (EBU) by Clifford Brown as scrutineer. The draw to determine the running order took place in late 1968 in London.

The event had a budget of around 5 million pesetas (€30,050). For the set built on the Teatro Real stage, the TVE scenography divisions in Madrid and Barcelona, headed by Bernardo Ballester, designed ten different proposals and built a scale model for each of them. These were shortlisted into three designs for further consideration, from which one was selected. The final design included the 5,000-pipe fixed organ already present at the back of the stage, a central steel sculpture created by surrealist artist Amadeo Gabino, (Note: TVE moved the sculpture, which is about 5 metres (16 ft) tall and weighs 350 kg (770 lb), to the garden at its premises in Prado del Rey after the contest, where it has remained ever since.) a scoreboard on the side, and fifteen thousand red and pink carnations. Since they were not allowed to make any modifications to the stage, not even hammering a nail into it, the set was prefabricated in more than three hundred modules that, brought from Prado del Rey, were assembled on-site. For better visibility, the floor of the set was raised 1 metre (3 ft 3 in) above the stage. For technical tests of colour broadcasting and lighting, a full-size replica of the Teatro Real stage with the set was built at Studio 1 in Prado del Rey.

TVE had full access to the concert hall starting from the evening of 16 March 1969, immediately after the audience and staff of that day's regular season concert had left the venue, which allowed its stage crew to begin assembling the set right away, its technical crew to begin setting up the equipment afterwards, and the orchestra to start rehearsals on 22 March. The rehearsals of the competing delegations on stage with the orchestra took place on 26 and 27 March, eight each day following the established running order for the competition. A full dress rehearsal was held on the evening of 28 March which included the voting process with simulated votes and a tie for first place. (Note: In the dress rehearsal held on 28 March, in which voting was also rehearsed with simulated votes, there had already been a tie for first place between Monaco and Luxembourg, both with 18 votes. EBU scrutineer Clifford Brown declared them joint winners after consulting the rules and verifying that there could be more than one winner. Laurita Valenzuela concluded the rehearsal by bidding farewell until next year in Monaco and Luxembourg "at the same time".) Technical rehearsals were held on the morning of 29 March, followed by a dress rehearsal in the afternoon ahead of the live broadcast that evening.

This was the second contest to be filmed and transmitted in colour, even though TVE did not have the required colour equipment for such a big event. A colour production truck, build by Fernseh, was provided by German Westdeutscher Rundfunk (WDR), and brought to Madrid from Cologne. Five colour television cameras inside the concert hall, three of them mounted on cranes, were used to broadcast the event. To avoid interruptions in the broadcast, the television signal was transmitted to the other broadcasters feeding the Eurovision network by two ways: (Note: Except for the connection with Lisbon for Radiotelevisão Portuguesa (RTP), which used a direct link since it is located in the opposite direction.) via the main terrestrial microwave relay link network through France, and via the Intelsat III F-2 satellite through Italy as a backup. (Note: To send the backup signal from Prado del Rey to the Radiotelevisione italiana (RAI) studios in Rome, the satellite ground stations in Buitrago del Lozoya and Fucino were used.) In addition, 137 dedicated telephone lines were used for transmission, internal communication, and communication with the participating broadcasters. In Spain itself the broadcast was seen in black and white because the local transmitters did not support colour transmissions. The colour recording equipment did not arrive in Madrid on time, so TVE only had a black and white copy of the contest, until a colour copy was rediscovered in the archives of NRK. A transmission via satellite was arranged for Brazil, Chile, and Puerto Rico just after midnight, and TVE prepared videotapes for later distribution to other Latin American broadcasters.

== Contest overview ==
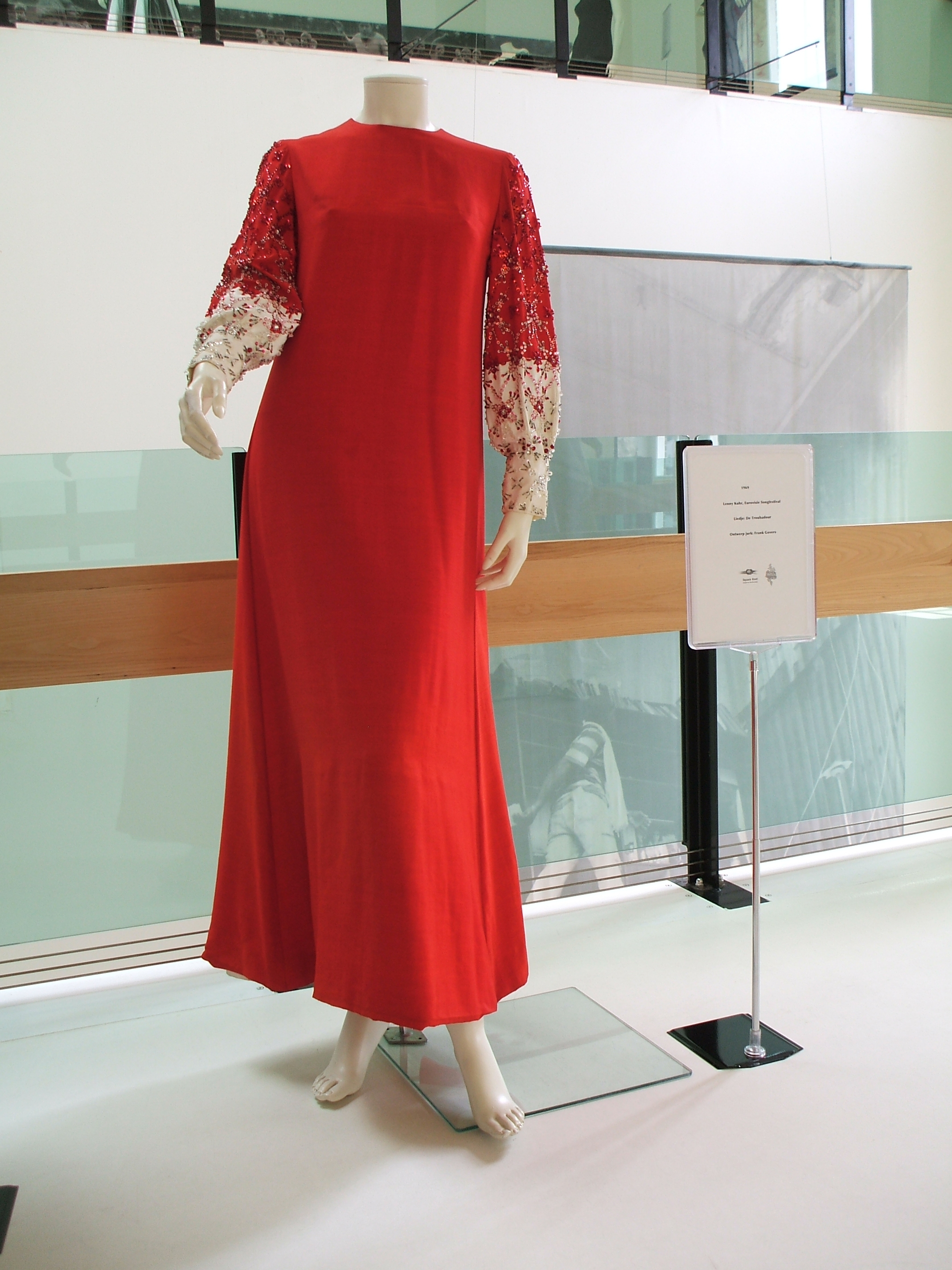
Lenny Kuhr's dress

The contest was held on 29 March 1969 at 22:00 CET. The show opened with a rendition of the Eurovision tune by the Teatro Real organ, followed by the orchestra performing the previous year's winning song, "La, la, la". The interval act consisted of a surrealist documentary titled La España diferente, directed by Javier Aguirre, with music by Luis de Pablo. The show ended with the orchestra performing a medley of previous Eurovision winning songs during the credits.

The winners were: Spain with "Vivo cantando", written by Aniano Alcalde and María José de Cerato, and performed by Salomé; the United Kingdom with "Boom Bang-a-Bang", written by Alan Moorhouse and Peter Warne, and performed by Lulu; the Netherlands with "De troubadour", written by David Hartsema and Lenny Kuhr, and performed by Kuhr herself; and France with "Un jour, un enfant", written by Eddy Marnay and Émile Stern, and performed by Frida Boccara.

It was the first time that the contest resulted in a tie for first place, with the four entries each gaining 18 votes. Since the rules in place at the time allowed more than one winner, all four were declared joint winners ex aequo. (Note: Following protests from participating broadcasters after the four-way tie, a tiebreaker rule to determine a single winner was adopted for the first time in the 1970 contest.) This caused a problem concerning the medals that were to be distributed to them, as there were not enough to go round, so only the singers received their medals on stage; the songwriters were not awarded theirs until later. The medals were presented by previous year's winner Massiel, after which all four winning songs were reprised.

Results of the Eurovision Song Contest 1969
R/O	Country	Artist	Song	Votes	Place
1	Yugoslavia	Ivan	"Pozdrav svijetu"	5	13
2	Luxembourg	Romuald	"Catherine"	7	11
3	Spain	Salomé	"Vivo cantando"	18	1
4	Monaco	Jean-Jacques	"Maman, Maman"	11	6
5	Ireland	Muriel Day	"The Wages of Love"	10	7
6	Italy	Iva Zanicchi	"Due grosse lacrime bianche"	5	13
7	United Kingdom	Lulu	"Boom Bang-a-Bang"	18	1
8	Netherlands	Lenny Kuhr	"De troubadour"	18	1
9	Sweden	Tommy Körberg	"Judy, min vän"	8	9
10	Belgium	Louis Neefs	"Jennifer Jennings"	10	7
11	Switzerland	Paola	"Bonjour, Bonjour"	13	5
12	Norway	Kirsti Sparboe	"Oj, oj, oj, så glad jeg skal bli"	1	16
13	Germany	Siw Malmkvist	"Primaballerina"	8	9
14	France	Frida Boccara	"Un jour, un enfant"	18	1
15	Portugal	Simone de Oliveira	"Desfolhada portuguesa"	4	15
16	Finland	Jarkko and Laura	"Kuin silloin ennen"	6	12

=== Spokespersons ===
Each participating broadcaster appointed a spokesperson who was responsible for announcing the votes for their respective jury via telephone. Known spokespersons at the 1969 contest are listed below.

- Belgium – Eugène Senelle
- Ireland – Brendan O'Reilly
- Finland – Poppe Berg
- Norway – Janka Polanyi
- Sweden – Edvard Matz
- United Kingdom – Colin Ward-Lewis
- Yugoslavia – Višnja Trputec

== Detailed voting results ==
Every participating broadcaster assembled a jury panel of ten people. Every jury member could give one vote to his or her favourite song, except that representing their own country. This means that any song could receive a maximum of 10 votes from a national jury, but none achieved this. The highest number of votes a song received from a jury was six, which went to the song from the Netherlands.

Although neither spokesperson made any errors in their announcements, EBU scrutineer Clifford Brown asked both the Spanish and the Monegasque spokespersons to repeat their votes. No adjustments were made to the scoring as a result of the repetition.

Detailed voting results
		Total score	Yugoslavia	Luxembourg	Spain	Monaco	Ireland	Italy	United Kingdom	Netherlands	Sweden	Belgium	Switzerland	Norway	Germany	France	Portugal	Finland
Contestants	Yugoslavia	5			1							1					3	
Contestants	Luxembourg	7	1			3				1		1			1			
Contestants	Spain	18	1	2		3	1					3		1	3	2	2	
Contestants	Monaco	11			2			4		2	2	1						
Contestants	Ireland	10							1	1	1		3		1			3
Contestants	Italy	5	1			1	1										1	1
Contestants	United Kingdom	18	2	4				3		1	5				1		1	1
Contestants	Netherlands	18		2		1		3				1	4	1		6		
Contestants	Sweden	8								1				3			1	3
Contestants	Belgium	10			2				3	1			2	2				
Contestants	Switzerland	13	2				3		2			1		1	2			2
Contestants	Norway	1									1							
Contestants	Germany	8	3		2							1		1		1		
Contestants	France	18		1		2	4		4	2	1		1		1		2	
Contestants	Portugal	4			2							1				1		
Contestants	Finland	6		1	1		1			1				1	1			

== Broadcasts ==
Each participating broadcaster was required to relay the contest live via its networks after receiving it through the Eurovision network. Non-participating EBU member broadcasters were also able to relay the contest as "passive participants". Broadcasters were able to send commentators to provide coverage of the contest in their own native language and to relay information about the artists and songs to their television viewers. In addition to the participating countries, the contest was also reportedly broadcast in 26 countries including Tunisia; in Bulgaria, Czechoslovakia, East Germany, Hungary, Poland, Romania, and the Soviet Union received via Intervision; and in Brazil, Chile, Mexico, Panama, and Puerto Rico. 30 radio and television commentators are reported to be present at the contest, with an estimated global audience of 250 to 400 million viewers.

Known details on the broadcasts in each country, including the specific broadcasting stations and commentators are shown in the tables below.

Broadcasters and commentators in participating countries
Country	Broadcaster	Channel(s)	Commentator(s)	Ref(s)
Belgium	BRT	BRT	Jan Theys	
Belgium	RTB	RTB	Paule Herreman	
Belgium	RTB	RTB 1		
Finland	YLE	TV-ohjelma 1, Yleisohjelma	Aarno Walli	
Finland	YLE	Ruotsinkielinen ohjelma		
France	ORTF	Deuxième Chaîne, France Inter	Pierre Tchernia	
Germany	ARD	Deutsches Fernsehen		
Ireland	RTÉ	RTÉ	Gay Byrne	
Ireland	RTÉ	RTÉ Radio	Kevin Roche	
Italy	RAI	Secondo Programma TV	Renato Tagliani	
Luxembourg	CLT	Télé-Luxembourg		
Netherlands	NTS	Nederland 1	Pim Jacobs	
Norway	NRK	NRK Fjernsynet, NRK (Note: Deferred broadcast on NRK at 22:30 (CET))	Sverre Christophersen (Note: The connection between the commentary booth in Madrid and the NRK studios in Oslo was disabled partway through the broadcast, resulting in the Norwegian commentary provided by Sverre Christophersen not being relayed to Norwegian viewers and listeners. Commentary was temporarily provided by Janka Polanyi before the Swedish feed was rerouted to also cover the Norwegian broadcasts, with the original connection to Christophersen ultimately fixed before the start of the voting sequence.)	
Portugal	RTP	I Programa, II Programa	Henrique Mendes	
Spain	TVE	TVE 1, TVE 2, TVE Canarias (Note: Deferred broadcast on TVE Canarias the following day at 22:35 (WET))	José Luis Uribarri	
Spain	RNE	Radio Nacional		
Spain	Radio Juventud			
Spain	Radio Popular			
Spain	Cadena SER (Note: Simulcast on Radio Barcelona, Radio Castellón, Radio Girona, Radio Lérida, Radio Murcia, Radio Orense, Radio Pamplona, Radio Rioja, Radio San Sebastián, Radio Sevilla, Radio Tarragona, Radio Valladolid, and Radio Zaragoza.)			
Sweden	SR	Sveriges TV, SR P3	Christina Hansegård	
Switzerland	SRG SSR	TV DRS		
Switzerland	SRG SSR	TSR	Georges Hardy	
Switzerland	SRG SSR	TSI		
United Kingdom	BBC	BBC1	David Gell	
United Kingdom	BBC	BBC Radio 1, BBC Radio 2	Pete Murray	
United Kingdom	BFBS	BFBS Radio	John Russell	
Yugoslavia	JRT	Televizija Beograd		
Yugoslavia	JRT	Televizija Ljubljana		
Yugoslavia	JRT	Televizija Zagreb		

Broadcasters and commentators in non-participating countries
Country	Broadcaster	Channel(s)	Commentator(s)	Ref(s)
Austria	ORF	FS1		
Brazil	Rede Tupi	TV Tupi Rio de Janeiro (Note: Delayed broadcast that same day at 20:15 (BRT))	Rubens Amaral	
Brazil	Rede Tupi	TV Tupi São Paulo	Rubens Amaral	
Brazil	Rede Tupi	TV Itacolomi	Rubens Amaral	
Brazil	Rede Tupi	TV Paraná	Rubens Amaral	
Brazil	Rede Tupi	TV Piratini	Rubens Amaral	
Brazil	Rede Tupi	TV Rádio Clube (Note: Delayed broadcast on 5 April at 21:30 (BRT))	Rubens Amaral	
Chile	TVU	Canal 9 (Note: Delayed broadcast that same day at 20:15 (CLT))		
Colombia	Inravisión	Canal Nacional (Note: Delayed broadcast in a shortened format on 1 May 1969 at 16:00 (COT))		
Costa Rica	Telecentro	Telecentro Canal 6 (Note: Delayed broadcast on 4 May 1969 at 21:00 (CST))	Roberto Giralt	
Costa Rica	Telenac	Telenac Canal 2	Roberto Giralt	
Czechoslovakia	ČST	ČST		
Hungary	MTV	MTV	Klári Poór	
Malta	MBA	MTS	Victor Aquilina	
Romania	TVR	Programul 1		
