= Ireland in the Eurovision Song Contest 1969 =

- Eurovision Song Contest 1969
- Participating broadcaster: Radio Telefís Éireann (RTÉ)
- Country: Ireland
- Selection process: National Song Contest
- Selection date: 16 February 1969

Competing entry
- Song: "The Wages of Love"
- Artist: Muriel Day and the Lindsays
- Songwriter: Michael Reade

Placement
- Final result: 7th, 10 points

Participation chronology

Ireland was represented at the Eurovision Song Contest 1969 with the song "The Wages of Love", written by Michael Reade, and performed by Muriel Day and the Lindsays. The Irish participating broadcaster, Radio Telefís Éireann (RTÉ), selected its entry through a national final, which was won by "The Wages of Love" performed by Muriel Day. Joined by the Lindsays, the song finished 7th place with 10 points in Eurovision.

== Before Eurovision ==
=== National Song Contest ===
==== Competing entries ====
RTÉ opened a submission period for composers to submit songs between 6 November 1968 and 1 January 1969. Composers had to be Irish-born or live in Ireland and could only submit a maximum of two songs each. RTÉ received 560 submissions and selected 8 songs from the received submissions and then assigned artists to those songs.

==== Final ====
The fifth National Song Contest was held on Sunday 16 February 1969 from the RTÉ studios in Dublin and was broadcast on RTÉ Television, and hosted by Brendan O'Reilly. The winning song was decided by 10 regional juries throughout Ireland.

The fifth National Song Contest is notable for featuring all four of Ireland's previous representatives (Butch Moore, Dickie Rock, Sean Dunphy, and Pat McGeegan), as well as the 1969 representative (Muriel Day) and the future 1970 representative (Dana).

Final - 16 February 1969
R/O	Artist	Song	Songwriter(s)	Points	Place
1	Sean Dunphy	"Paper Boats"	Audrey Meredith	3	5
2	Dana	"Look Around"	Michael Reade	8	2
3	Butch Moore	"Too Late"	Joe Burkett; Andy Galligan	2	8
4	Muriel Day	"The Wages of Love"	Michael Reade	30	1
5	Dickie Rock	"Now Do You Believe Me?"	Jim Doherty	6	3
6	Eleanor Nodwell	"Talking to Myself"	Frank Dunne; Dolores Rockett	3	5
7	Pat McGeegan	"Johnny Dreamer"	George Meredith; Audrey Meredith	5	4
8	Fiorenza Viani-Nolan	"1959"	Jim Doherty	3	5

== At Eurovision ==
The contest was seen by 1 million viewers.

Muriel Day and the Lindsays performed 5th at the beginning of the startfield and finished 7th with 10 points.

=== Voting ===
Points awarded to Ireland
Score	Country
3 points	Finland; Switzerland
1 point	Germany; Netherlands; Sweden; United Kingdom

Points awarded by Ireland
Score	Country
4 points	France
3 points	Switzerland
1 point	Finland; Italy; Spain
