= Spanska Siw =

Studio album by Siw Malmkvist
- Released: September 1970
- Genre: schlager
- Label: Metronome
- Producer: Anders Burman

Siw Malmkvist chronology
Underbara Siw (1970)	Spanska Siw (1970)	Mycket Siw och lite dragspel (1971)

Spanska Siw is a 1970 Siw Malmkvist studio album.

== Track listing ==
=== Side A ===
1. Spanska Siw (Spanish Rose)
2. Livet är fullt av svindlande höjder (The Peaceful Heart)
3. Vackraste paret i världen (La Coppia Piu' Bella Del Mondo), with Svante Thuresson
4. Ingenting går upp mot gamla Skåne (Wärst du doch in Düsseldorf geblieben)
5. Primaballerina

=== Side B ===
1. Köp en tulpan (annars får du en snyting)
2. Ljuva barndomstid (Sweet Blidness)
3. Jag är kvinna, du är man (You're a Woman, I'm a Man), with Svante Thuresson
4. Leonard, Lisa och Leif (Love Was so Easy to Give)
5. Riddar Blåskägg (Take a Bow Rufus Humfry)
