= Underbara Siw =

Studio album by Siw Malmkvist
- Released: April 1970
- Recorded: Metronome Studio, 26–27 January, 3–9 February, 3–9 March 1970
- Genre: schlager
- Label: Metronome
- Producer: Anders Burman

Siw Malmkvist chronology
Harlekin (1968)	Underbara Siw (1970)	Spanska Siw (1970)

Underbara Siw is a 1970 Siw Malmkvist studio album.

== Track listing ==
=== Side A ===
1. Vart tog din kärlek vägen (You've Lost That Lovin' Feelin') (Barry Mann, Cynthia Weil, Phil Spector, Stig Anderson)
2. Kanske var sommaren varm (Wanting Things) (Burt Bacharach, Sven Olov Bagge)
3. Kommer du ihåg? (Bo-Göran Edling, Staffan Ehrling)
4. Sov inte på tunnelbanan (Don't Sleep in the Subway) (Jackie Trent, Peter Himmelstrand, Tony Hatch)
5. Det måste vara han (It Must Be Gim) (Gilbert Bécaud, Peter Himmelstrand)

=== Side B ===
1. Regnet det bara öser ner (Raindrops Keep Fallin' on My Head) (Burt Bacharach, Sven Olov Bagge)
2. I mitt liv (In My Life) (Beppe Wolgers, Lennon-McCartney)
3. Mitt lilla barn (sång: Tove) (Barbro Lindgren, Georg Wadenius)
4. Både en och två (Love's Been Good To Me) (Britt Lindeborg, Rod McKuen)
5. Pröva lite kärlek nå'n gång (Put a Little Love in Your Heart) (Jackie DeShannon, Jimmy Holiday, Randy Myers)
