= Netherlands in the Eurovision Song Contest 1969 =

- Eurovision Song Contest 1969
- Participating broadcaster: Nederlandse Televisie Stichting (NTS)
- Country: Netherlands
- Selection process: Nationaal Songfestival 1969
- Selection date: 26 February 1969

Competing entry
- Song: "De troubadour"
- Artist: Lenny Kuhr
- Songwriters: David Hartsema; Lenny Kuhr

Placement
- Final result: 1st, 18 points

Participation chronology

The Netherlands was represented at the Eurovision Song Contest 1969 with the song "De troubadour", composed by David Hartsema, with lyrics by Lenny Kuhr, and performed by Kuhr herself. The Dutch participating broadcaster, Nederlandse Televisie Stichting (NTS), selected its entry through a national final. The song won the competition in a joint win with the songs from France, Spain, and the United Kingdom.

== Before Eurovision ==
=== Nationaal Songfestival 1969 ===
The final was held on 26 February 1969 at the Circustheater in Scheveningen, hosted by Pim Jacobs. Ten songs took part and the winning song was chosen by a national and an international jury. "De troubadour" emerged the narrow winner by a 1-point margin.

Former Dutch representative Anneke Grönloh (1964) was among the participants.

Final – 26 February 1969
R/O	Artist	Song	Points	Place
1	Annet Hesterman	"Zoek het niet te ver"	2	4
2	John Lamers	"Als een donderslag"	0	8
3	Lenny Kuhr	"De troubadour"	7	1
4	Anneke Grönloh	"Heartbeat"	1	5
5	Frankie Luyten	"Haat me niet"	0	8
6	Patricia Paay	"Jij alleen"	1	5
7	Rob de Nijs	"Zaterdagavondshow"	0	8
8	Linda Ross	"Goodbye My Love"	1	5
9	Dave	"Niets gaat zo snel"	3	3
10	Conny Vink	"De toeteraar"	6	2

Detailed International Jury Votes
R/O	Song	Finland	Ireland	Sweden	Italy	Belgium	France	Portugal	Norway	Yugoslavia	West Germany	Spain	Luxembourg	Austria	United Kingdom	Switzerland	Netherlands	Total
R/O	Song	(Finland)	(Republic of Ireland)	(Sweden)	(Italy)	(Belgium)	(France)	(Portugal)	(Norway)	(Socialist Federal Republic of Yugoslavia)	(West Germany)	(Spain)	(Luxembourg)	(Austria)	(United Kingdom)	(Switzerland)	(Netherlands)	Total
1	"Zoek het niet te ver"			1		1												2
2	"Als een donderslag"																	0
3	"De troubadour"		1				1	1				1	1				2	7
4	"Heartbeat"																1	1
5	"Haat me niet"																	0
6	"Jij alleen"														1			1
7	"Zaterdagavondshow"																	0
8	"Goodbye My Love"									1								1
9	"Niets gaat zo snel"	1			1											1		3
10	"De toeteraar"								1		1			1			3	6

== At Eurovision ==
On the night of the final Kuhr performed 8th in the running order, following the United Kingdom and preceding Sweden. At the close of voting "De troubadour" had received 18 points, making the Netherlands joint winners of the contest along with France, Spain, and the United Kingdom, as there was no mechanism in place at the time to determine an outright winner if more than one country tied for first place on the scoreboard. This was the Netherlands' third Eurovision victory and brought to an end a dreadful run in which the country had failed to place higher than 10th since 1959.

The Dutch conductor at the contest was Frans de Kok.

The Netherlands later won the right to host the 1970 contest after lots were drawn by two of the four winning nations.

=== Voting ===
Each participating broadcaster assembled a jury panel of ten people. Every jury member could give one point to his or her favourite song.

Points awarded to the Netherlands
Score	Country
6 points	France
4 points	Switzerland
3 points	Italy
2 points	Luxembourg
1 point	Belgium; Monaco; Norway

Points awarded by the Netherlands
Score	Country
2 points	France; Monaco
1 point	Belgium; Finland; Ireland; Luxembourg; Sweden; United Kingdom
