= Portugal in the Eurovision Song Contest 1969 =

- Eurovision Song Contest 1969
- Participating broadcaster: Radiotelevisão Portuguesa (RTP)
- Country: Portugal
- Selection process: Grande Prémio TV da Canção Portuguesa 1969
- Selection date: 24 February 1969

Competing entry
- Song: "Desfolhada portuguesa"
- Artist: Simone de Oliveira
- Songwriters: Nuno Nazareth Fernandes; Ary dos Santos

Placement
- Final result: 15th, 4 points

Participation chronology

Portugal was represented at the Eurovision Song Contest 1969 with the song "Desfolhada portuguesa", composed by Nuno Nazareth Fernandes, with lyrics by Ary dos Santos, and performed by Simone de Oliveira. The Portuguese participating broadcaster, Radiotelevisão Portuguesa (RTP), selected its entry at the Grande Prémio TV da Canção Portuguesa 1969. This was her second participation in Eurovision, having already represented Portugal in 1965.

== Before Eurovision ==
=== Grande Prémio TV da Canção Portuguesa 1969 ===
Radiotelevisão Portuguesa (RTP) held the Grande Prémio TV da Canção Portuguesa 1969 at the Teatro São Luiz in Lisbon on 24 February 1969, hosted by Lurdes Norberto. It was the first time that the competition was held in front of an audience. Ten songs took part in the final. Ferrer Trindade conducted all but two songs. The results were determined by a distrital jury, composed by three members, each had 5 votes to be distributed among the songs it intended to award, making a total of 15 votes per district.

Grande Prémio TV da Canção Portuguesa - 24 February 1969
R/O	Artist	Song	Votes	Place
1	Simone de Oliveira	"Desfolhada portuguesa"	92	1
2	Daniel	"Os fios da esperança"	9	8
3	Teresa Paula Brito	"Buscando um horizonte"	6	10
4	Lilly Tchiumba	"Flor bailarina"	7	9
5	Valério Silva	"Sol da manhã"	33	3
6	Madalena Iglésias	"Canção para um poeta"	11	6
7	Artur Garcia	"Sombra de ninguém"	11	6
8	Duo Ouro Negro	"Tenho amor para amar"	49	2
9	Fernando Tordo	"Cantiga"	23	5
10	Maria da Fé	"Vento do norte"	27	4

Detailed Distrital Jury Votes
R/O	Song	Aveiro	Beja	Braga	Bragança	Castelo Branco	Coimbra	Évora	Faro	Guarda	Leiria	Lisbon	Portalegre	Porto	Santarém	Setúbal	Viana do Castelo	Vila Real	Viseu	Total
1	"Desfolhada portuguesa"	8	4	3	1	5	4	14	4	6	1	6	2	6	3	9	9	4	5	92
2	"Os fios da esperança"					1			1			1		1	1	3		1		9
3	"Buscando um horizonte"						2						2		2					6
4	"Flor Bailarina"				3		3											1		7
5	"Sol da manhã"	2	7	3		2	1	1		1	8		3				2	3		33
6	"Canção para um poeta"		1	2			1			3		1	1	2						11
7	"Sombra de ninguém"	1		6							1						1	2		11
8	"Tenho Amor Para Amar"	4			3	1	3		6	2	2	4	7		5			2	10	49
9	"Cantiga"				5	4	1		1	2				5		3	1	1		23
10	"Vento do norte"		3	1	3	2			3	1	3	3		1	4		2	1		27

== At Eurovision ==
On the night of the final Oliveira performed 15th in the running order, following France and preceding Finland. At the close of the voting the song had received 4 points, coming 15th in the field of 16 competing countries.

The orchestra during the Portuguese entry was conducted by Ferrer Trindade.

The Portuguese people followed the minute the presence of Simone de Oliveira in Eurovision, through the reports emitted by the radio and newspapers of that time. It was a great disappointment when it became known that Oliveira and the choristers were unwell on the eve of the event due to having eaten spoiled apple pie, which forced them to undergo medical intervention. Fortunately, this episode did not prevent Simone, the two members of the choir (Maria Alexandre de Brito and Natália Rodrigues de Matos) and the guitarist (António Luís Gomes) from taking the stage of the Teatro Real.

Despite the poor placing, when Simone returned by train from Madrid to Santa Apolónia Station, in Lisbon, she was received with the biggest demonstration ever given to a singer by the Portuguese people, even at a time when demonstrations were prohibited. The regime was unable to stop the strength of the people who made a point of paying homage to their representative at the Eurovision and sang "Desfolhada portuguesa" in unison.

=== Voting ===
Points awarded to Portugal
Score	Country
2 points	Spain
1 point	Belgium; France

Points awarded by Portugal
Score	Country
3 points	Yugoslavia
2 points	France; Spain
1 point	Italy; Sweden; United Kingdom
