= Yugoslavia in the Eurovision Song Contest 1969 =

- Eurovision Song Contest 1969
- Participating broadcaster: Jugoslavenska radiotelevizija (JRT)
- Country: Yugoslavia
- Selection process: Jugovizija 1969
- Selection date: 15 February 1969

Competing entry
- Song: "Pozdrav svijetu"
- Artist: Ivan and 3M
- Songwriter: Milan Lentić

Placement
- Final result: 13th, 5 points

Participation chronology

Yugoslavia was represented at the Eurovision Song Contest 1969 with the song "Pozdrav svijetu", written by Milan Lentić, and performed by Ivan. The Yugoslavian participating broadcaster, Jugoslavenska radiotelevizija (JRT), selected its entry through Jugovizija 1969.

== Before Eurovision ==
=== Jugovizija 1969 ===
The Yugoslav national final to select their entry, was held on 15 February at the RTV Zagreb studios in Zagreb. The host was Oliver Mlakar. There were 17 songs in the final, from six subnational public broadcasters. The winner was chosen by the votes of a mixed jury of experts and citizens, one juror from each of the subnational public broadcasters of JRT, and three non-experts - citizens. The winning song was "Pozdrav svijetu", written and composed by Milan Lentić, and performed by the Croatian group 4M, comprising members Ivica Krajač, Branko Marušić, Saša Sablić and Željko Ružić. Lola Jovanović represented Yugoslavia in 1962 and Vice Vukov represented the country twice, in 1963 and 1965.

Final – 15 February 1969
R/O	Broadcaster	Artist	Song	Points	Place
1	(Socialist Republic of Macedonia) RTV Skopje	Slave Dimitrov and Vera Janova	"Bitola"	1	11
2	(Socialist Republic of Macedonia) RTV Skopje	Nina Spirova	"Blagodaram"	0	14
3	(Socialist Republic of Serbia) RTV Belgrade	Korni grupa	"Cigu, cigu ligu"	8	3
4	(Socialist Republic of Croatia) RTV Zagreb	Vice Vukov	"Cvijeće za Mariju"	3	8
5	(Socialist Republic of Slovenia) RTV Ljubljana	Marjana Deržaj	"Čarovnica"	3	8
6	(Socialist Republic of Bosnia and Herzegovina) RTV Sarajevo	Neda Ukraden	"Dilema"	1	11
7	(Socialist Republic of Slovenia) RTV Ljubljana	Majda Sepe	"Grad iz peska"	11	2
8	(Socialist Republic of Serbia) RTV Belgrade	Žarko Dančuo	"Kome da dam svoju ljubav"	1	11
9	(Socialist Republic of Bosnia and Herzegovina) RTV Sarajevo	Josipa Lisac	"Na, na, na, na (Najljepši dan)"	0	14
10	(Socialist Republic of Croatia) RTV Zagreb	Ivo Robić	"Naš rastanak"	5	6
11	(Socialist Republic of Macedonia) RTV Skopje	Olivera Vučo	"Poigraj, poigraj devojče"	8	3
12	(Socialist Republic of Slovenia) RTV Ljubljana	Alenka Pinterič	"Povprašaj Mona Lizo"	5	6
13	(Socialist Republic of Croatia) RTV Zagreb	4M	"Pozdrav svijetu"	25	1
14	(Socialist Republic of Serbia) RTV Belgrade	Lola Jovanović	"Sećanje"	3	8
15	(Socialist Republic of Montenegro) RTV Titograd	Mili Knežević	"Taj ludi mladi svijet"	0	14
16	(Socialist Republic of Bosnia and Herzegovina) RTV Sarajevo	Indexi	"Zaborav"	7	5
17	(Socialist Republic of Montenegro) RTV Titograd	Vlado Mračević	"Zalazi sunce ljubavi"	0	14

Detailed Jury Votes
R/O	Song	Vartkes Baronijan	Mario Bogliuni	Branko Gligorov	Dušan Hren	Cvetko Jovanović	Sunčica Komadina	Jasmina Marinović	Slavko Mihalić	Dejan Zagorac	Total
1	"Bitola"							1			1
2	"Blagodaram"										0
3	"Cigu, cigu ligu"		1	3	1					3	8
4	"Cvijeće za Mariju"								3		3
5	"Čarovnica"							3			3
6	"Dilema"					1					1
7	"Grad iz peska"	5				5				1	11
8	"Kome da dam svoju ljubav"						1				1
9	"Na, na, na, na (Najljepši dan)"										0
10	"Naš rastanak"	1		1	3						5
11	"Poigraj, poigraj devojče"	3	5								8
12	"Povprašaj Mona Lizo"			5							5
13	"Pozdrav svijetu"				5		5	5	5	5	25
14	"Sećanje"					3					3
15	"Taj ludi mladi svijet"										0
16	"Zaborav"		3				3		1		7
17	"Zalazi sunce ljubavi"										0

== At Eurovision ==
The contest was broadcast on Televizija Beograd, Televizija Zagreb, and Televizija Ljubljana.

Because groups weren't allowed at the contest, lead singer Ivica Krajač was credited as Ivan, and the three other members of the group accompanied him as backing singers under the collective title 3M.

They performed 1st on the night of the contest, preceding Luxembourg. At the close of the voting the song had received 5 points, coming 13th in the field of 16 competing countries.

=== Voting ===
Points awarded to Yugoslavia
Score	Country
3 points	Portugal
1 point	Belgium; Spain

Points awarded by Yugoslavia
Score	Country
3 points	Germany
2 points	Switzerland; United Kingdom
1 point	Italy; Luxembourg; Spain
