= United Kingdom in the Eurovision Song Contest 1969 =

- Eurovision Song Contest 1969
- Participating broadcaster: British Broadcasting Corporation (BBC)
- Country: United Kingdom
- Selection process: Artist: Internal selection Song: A Song for Europe 1969
- Announcement date: 1 March 1969

Competing entry
- Song: "Boom Bang-a-Bang"
- Artist: Lulu
- Songwriters: Alan Moorhouse; Peter Warne

Placement
- Final result: 1st, 18 points

Participation chronology

The United Kingdom was represented at the Eurovision Song Contest 1969 with the song "Boom Bang-a-Bang", composed by Alan Moorhouse, with lyrics by Peter Warne, and performed by Scottish singer Lulu. The British participating broadcaster, the British Broadcasting Corporation (BBC), selected its entry through a televised national final, after having previously selected the performer internally. The song won the competition in a joint win with the songs from France, the Netherlands, and Spain.

== Before Eurovision ==
=== A Song for Europe 1969 ===
After performing all six songs weekly on her eponymous TV series Lulu, the final was held on 22 February 1969 and presented by Michael Aspel. Of the six finalists, "I Can't Go On Living Without You", was written by Elton John and Bernie Taupin, before both found songwriting fame. John recorded the track as a demo which later became available on CD. Andrew Lloyd Webber and Tim Rice also submitted a song called "Try It and See" but this failed to reach the final. They later reworked the track and it became "King Herod's Song" in the musical Jesus Christ Superstar. Viewers cast votes on postcards via mail to choose the winner. The winning song, announced on 1 March 1969, with 56,476 votes, was "Boom Bang-a-Bang".

A Song for Europe 1969 – 22 February 1969
R/O	Song	Votes	Place
1	"Are You Ready For Love?"	5,560	5
2	"March!"	38,418	2
3	"Come September"	11,362	3
4	"I Can't Go On Living Without You"	5,087	6
5	"Boom Bang-a-Bang"	56,476	1
6	"Bet Yer"	8,306	4

=== Chart success ===
"Boom Bang-a-Bang" was released on single, with the runner-up in the national final "March!" on the B-Side and reached No. 2 in the UK singles chart, remaining Lulu's most successful solo single of her career in Britain. She also reportedly recorded the winner in French, Italian, German and Spanish. A third song from the competition "Come September", co-written by Mark London, the husband of Lulu's manager Marion Massey, was released later in 1969 as an album track on the LP Lulu's Album. Eventually, all six recordings of the songs by Lulu were made available on various CD compilations. Former Eurovision winner Grethe Ingmann and German contestant Heidi Brühl (who had both taken part in the Eurovision Song Contest 1963) recorded a Danish and German version of the winning song respectively.

Other Eurovision artists recorded versions of the songs from the UK final. Swedish singer (and future Eurovision winner) Agnetha Fältskog recorded a version of "Are You Ready For Love?" under the title "Ge dej till tåls". Finland's Katri Helena recorded "Come September" as "Taas kun tuulee", while another Finnish version was recorded by Jarkko & Laura under the title "Kahden ollaan". Jarkko & Laura were competitors against Lulu in the 1969 Eurovision final. Gloria Hunniford also recorded "Are You Ready For Love?" in the UK. In Britain, Cilla Black, Sandie Shaw and Polly Brown all recorded versions of "I Can't Go On Living Without You".

== At Eurovision ==
The United Kingdom went on to finish in a four-way win in Madrid with the songs from host country Spain, plus the Netherlands and France, the first time ever a tie-break situation had occurred. However, there was no rule at the time to cover such an eventuality, so all four countries were declared joint winners.

France's win was their fourth. France became the first country to win the contest four times. The Netherlands' win was their third. Spain and the United Kingdom each won for the second time. And it was the first time that any country (Spain, in this case) had a winning ESC entry two years in a row.

David Gell provided the television commentary for BBC1 at the Eurovision final on 29 March, Michael Aspel was acting as the standby commentator. Pete Murray provided the commentary for BBC Radio 1 listeners and John Russell provided the commentary for British Forces Radio. The contest was watched by 8 million viewers.

=== Voting ===
Points awarded to the United Kingdom
Score	Country
5 points	Sweden
4 points	Luxembourg
3 points	Italy
2 points	Yugoslavia
1 point	Finland; Germany; Netherlands; Portugal

Points awarded by the United Kingdom
Score	Country
4 points	France
3 points	Belgium
2 points	Switzerland
1 point	Ireland
