= Clifford Brown (director) =

Scottish television director

Clifford Brown MBE
- Brown as executive supervisor during the Eurovision Song Contest 1977
- Born: 22 July 1916; Inverness, Scotland
- Died: 16 December 1993 (aged 77)
- Occupation(s): Television editor and director
- Years active: 1960s–1993

Clifford Brown MBE (22 July 1916 – 16 December 1993) was a Scottish television editor and director who became the second European Broadcasting Union (EBU) head of the Eurovision Song Contest serving as supervising director of the show from 1966 to 1977.

== Early life and career ==
Brown was born in 1916 in Inverness, Scotland, after joining the army he started working for Scottish Television and ITV. In 1966, he was appointed to be director for the Eurovision Song Contest and moved to Geneva to work at the EBU.

Over his tenure the song contest grew from one hosted in hotel ballrooms and television studios to an event filling large concert halls. It also became too expensive for smaller countries to host; for example, Monaco and Luxembourg declined to host after winning the contest in 1971 and 1973 respectively (Luxembourg having already hosted that year). His era also saw the introduction of the douze points voting system that has become the Eurovision standard.

== European Broadcasting Union ==
While serving as head of Eurovision he appeared on the broadcasts as the adjudicator and scrutineer of the voting. In 1969, when the Contest was held in Spain, there was a four-way tie between France, Spain, UK and the Netherlands. Before the show, the presenter (Laura Valenzuela) had reportedly asked Brown what would happen if there was a tie; his reply was "Madam, that never happened before, and that's never going to happen", as noted in The Eurovision Song Contest — The Official History by author and historian John Kennedy O'Connor. Brown admitted in a BBC documentary in 1992 that the result caused disgust among many people, not least the Scandinavian countries.

Brown stepped down as scrutineer in 1977 and was awarded the MBE award in 1990. He died in December 1993 after a period of ill health.

=== Eurovision Song Contest ===
Brown was the Executive Supervisor for twelve Eurovision Song Contests, his first being in 1966 which was held in Luxembourg, and his last being in 1977 which was held in the United Kingdom.

== See also ==
- European Broadcasting Union (EBU)
  - Eurovision Song Contest

Preceded by Miroslav Vilček	Scrutineer (present-day Executive Supervisor) of the Eurovision Song Contest; 1966–1977	Succeeded by Frank Naef
