= Emil Stern =

- Born: 28 April 1913; Paris, France
- Origin: France
- Died: 14 January 1997 (aged 83) Cannes, France
- Genre: Various
- Occupation: Composer
- Years active: 1930s–1997

Émile Stern (28 April 1913 – 14 January 1997), best known under his artistic pseudonym Emil Stern, was a French composer, pianist and conductor of Romanian descent. He was born in Paris. Together with his writing partner Eddy Marnay they wrote one of the winning songs for the Eurovision Song Contest 1969: "Un jour, un enfant", sung by Frida Boccara. He wrote the scores for Claude Berri's film Mazel Tov ou le Mariage.

== Selected songs ==
=== Marie Laforêt ===
- "Ivan, Boris et moi", lyrics by Eddy Marnay (1967)
