= Sweden in the Eurovision Song Contest 1969 =

- Eurovision Song Contest 1969
- Participating broadcaster: Sveriges Radio (SR)
- Country: Sweden
- Selection process: Melodifestivalen 1969
- Selection date: 1 March 1969

Competing entry
- Song: "Judy, min vän"
- Artist: Tommy Körberg
- Songwriters: Roger Wallis; Britt Lindeborg

Placement
- Final result: 9th, 8 points

Participation chronology

Sweden was represented at the Eurovision Song Contest 1969 with the song "Judy, min vän", composed by Roger Wallis, with lyrics by Britt Lindeborg, and performed by Tommy Körberg.The Swedish participating broadcaster, Sveriges Radio (SR), selected its entry through Melodifestivalen 1969. In the national final, a tie occurred between two songs, but after additional voting, the song "Judy, min vän" performed by Tommy Körberg, was selected over the other song, "Hej clown", written by Lasse Berghagen and later ABBA member Benny Andersson, and performed by Jan Malmsjö.

At the Eurovision Song Contest, held in Madrid, "Judy, min vän" finished 9th out of 16. Most points came from Sweden's neighbours, Norway and Finland. Sharing the 9th place was Germany, represented by the Swedish singer Siw Malmkvist, who had also represented Sweden in 1960. She did, however, not get any points from Sweden.

== Before Eurovision ==
=== Melodifestivalen 1969 ===
Melodifestivalen 1969 was the selection for the 11th song to represent Sweden at the Eurovision Song Contest. It was the 10th time that Sveriges Radio (SR) used this system of picking a song. 2,402 songs were submitted to SR for the competition. The final was held in the Cirkus in Stockholm on 1 March 1969, hosted by Pekka Langer, and was broadcast on TV1, but was not broadcast on radio. This was the first time a tie occurred for first place in the competition.

Melodifestivalen 1969 – 1 March 1969
R/O	Artist	Song	Songwriter(s)	Votes	Place
1	Inger Öst	"Du ser mig inte"	Berndt Öst; Peter Himmelstrand	1	8
2	Jan Malmsjö	"Hej clown"	Benny Andersson; Lasse Berghagen	31	2
3	Ann-Louise Hanson	"Svensk flicka"	Staffan Ehrling; Bo-Göran Edling	8	4
4	Tommy Körberg	"Judy, min vän"	Roger Wallis; Britt Lindeborg	31	1
5	Lena Hansson	"Du ger mig lust att leva"	Johnny Carlsson	3	7
6	Ola Håkansson	"Du skänker mening åt mitt liv"	Pierre Isacsson	0	9
7	Britt Bergström	"L, som i älskar dig"	Staffan Ehrling; Kerstin Lindén	0	9
8	Sten Nilsson	"Gång på gång"	Staffan Ehrling; Bo-Göran Edling	13	3
9	Anni-Frid Lyngstad	"Härlig är vår jord"	Ivan Renliden	8	4
10	Svante Thuresson	"Sommarflicka"	Pugh Rogefeldt	4	6

Tie-break
Artist	Song	Votes	Place
Jan Malmsjö	"Hej clown"	45	2
Tommy Körberg	"Judy, min vän"	54	1

== At Eurovision ==
=== Voting ===
Points awarded to Sweden
Score	Country
3 points	Finland; Norway
1 point	Netherlands; Portugal

Points awarded by Sweden
Score	Country
5 points	United Kingdom
2 points	Monaco
1 point	France; Ireland; Norway
