= Primaballerina =

1969 single by Siw Malmkvist

- Single cover

Single by Siw Malmkvist

from the album Primaballerina
- B-side: "Mir fehlt der Knopf am Pyjama"
- Released: 1969
- Recorded: 1969
- Genre: Schlager
- Length: 2:47
- Label: Metronome
- Songwriter: Hans Blum

Siw Malmkvist singles chronology
"Zigeunerhochzeit" (1968)	"Primaballerina" (1969)	"Adiolé" (1970)

Audio sample
- file; help

Eurovision Song Contest 1969 entry
- Country: Germany
- Artist: Siw Malmkvist
- Language: German
- Composer: Hans Blum
- Lyricist: Hans Blum

Finals performance
- Final result: 9th
- Final points: 8

Entry chronology
- ◄ "Ein Hoch der Liebe" (1968)
- "Wunder gibt es immer wieder" (1970) ►

"Primaballerina" (from Italian for "first ballerina" – the second highest female ballet dancer) is a 1969 song performed in German by Swedish singer Siw Malmkvist and written by Hans Blum. It was the German entry in the Eurovision Song Contest 1969. Malmkvist was the second of three female Scandinavian schlager artists to represent Germany in the contest in the late 1960s and early 1970s, the first being Norwegian Wenche Myhre in 1968 with "Ein Hoch der Liebe" and the third Danish Gitte Hænning with "Junger Tag" in 1973. Malmkvist had previously also represented her native Sweden in the 1960 contest with "Alla andra får varann".

== Song information ==
"Primaballerina" is a midtempo schlager song. It is addressed to a porcelain figure on a clock, who is asked why she is alone and has to pass through life without a lover. The singer tells that music is the life of the Primaballerina and that she just keeps turning to chimes. Nevertheless, in the final chorus she says that one day everything beautiful will fade and that the porcelaine figure will never understand that.

=== Excerpt ===
==== German ====
Primaballerina, Primaballerina
Alles Schöne dieser Welt, das muss einmal vergehn
Primaballerina, Primaballerina
Kleine Porzellanfigur, das wirst du nie verstehn

==== English translation ====
Prima ballerina, prima ballerina
Everything beautiful of this world has to fade one day
Prima ballerina, prima ballerina
Little porcelaine figurette, you will never understand that

== At the national final ==
Three singers took part in the German national final for the Eurovision Song Contest 1969, each of them performing three songs. It was the third song performed by Siw Malmkvist and the seventh song performed overall in the first round of voting following Peggy March with "Aber die Liebe bleibt bestehn" and preceding Rex Gildo with "Festival der jungen Liebe" and first in the second round of voting with only three songs remaining. In the final round, the song was awarded seven out of 13 possible points sending the song to the Eurovision Song Contest in Madrid.

== At the Eurovision Song Contest ==
The song was performed thirteenth on the night, following Norway's Kirsti Sparboe with "Oj, oj, oj, så glad jeg skal bli" and preceding France's Frida Boccara with "Un jour, un enfant". At the close of voting, it had received 8 points, placing 9th in a field of 16. It was succeeded as German representative at the 1970 contest by Katja Ebstein with "Wunder gibt es immer wieder".

== Other versions ==
=== Other versions by Siw Malmkvist ===
Malmkvist recorded other two versions of the song: in her native Swedish and in Spanish. The title was kept for both versions.

=== Cover versions ===
Many cover versions of the song were recorded:

- Estonian singer Heli Lääts covered the song in Estonian as "Kaunid baleriinid". A dance remix of that version was also released.
- Two Dutch singers recorded Dutch versions of the song: Imca Marina and Patricia Dee.
- Finnish singer Robin covered the song in Finnish as "Prinsessa".
- Paul Mauriat recorded an instrumental version of the song.
- A Slovak version of the song was released by Czech singer Alena Tichá as "Primabalerína".

== Releases and commercial success ==
The song was released on a vinyl single with the song "Mir fehlt der Knopf am Pyjama" as B-side. The song entered the German single charts and eventually peaked at #13. It is Siw Malkvist's third last charted single to date. It was the most successful German Eurovision Song Contest entry since "Zwei kleine Italiener" in 1962 and the second most successful one overall at the time of its release. The song later appeared on various Siw Malmkvist greatest hits compilations and on German Eurovision Song Contest compilations.
