= Norway in the Eurovision Song Contest 1969 =

- Eurovision Song Contest 1969
- Participating broadcaster: Norsk rikskringkasting (NRK)
- Country: Norway
- Selection process: Melodi Grand Prix 1969
- Selection date: 1 March 1969

Competing entry
- Song: "Oj, oj, oj, så glad jeg skal bli"
- Artist: Kirsti Sparboe
- Songwriter: Arne Bendiksen

Placement
- Final result: 16th, 1 point

Participation chronology

Norway was represented at the Eurovision Song Contest 1969 with the song "Oj, oj, oj, så glad jeg skal bli", written by Arne Bendiksen, and performed by Kirsti Sparboe. The Norwegian participating broadcaster, Norsk rikskringkasting (NRK), selected its entry through the Melodi Grand Prix 1969. This was the last of three Eurovision appearances in five years for Sparboe.

== Before Eurovision ==
=== Melodi Grand Prix 1969 ===
Norsk rikskringkasting (NRK) held the Melodi Grand Prix 1969 at its studios in Oslo, hosted by Janka Polyani. Ten songs took part in the final, with the winner chosen by ten regional juries who each had 5 points to divide between the songs. Other performers included the previous year's Norwegian singer Odd Børre and Lill-Babs, who had sung for Sweden in 1961.

MGP - 1 March 1969
R/O	Artist	Song	Points	Place
1	Vigdis Mostred	"Friaren"	4	5
2	Elisabeth Granneman	"BM Fordomsfri"	5	3
3	Kirsti Sparboe	"Oj, oj, oj, så glad jeg skal bli"	18	1
4	Inger Lise Andersen	"Eventyr"	1	9
5	Lill-Babs	"Juksemaker pipelort"	0	10
6	Per Müller	"Sangen om den flygender Hollender"	4	5
7	Lillian Askerland	"La meg sove"	5	3
8	Jan Høiland	"Om du går på en strand"	2	7
9	Stein Ingebrigtsen	"Viddu ha tjangs"	2	7
10	Odd Børre	"Lena"	9	2

== At Eurovision ==
On the night of the final Sparboe performed 12th in the running order, following Switzerland and preceding Germany. "Oj, oj, oj, så glad jeg skal bli" was one of the many uptempo pop offerings which dominated the 1969 contest, but appeared not to have been able to distinguish itself from the crowd, as at the close of voting the song had received only 1 point (from Sweden), placing Norway last of the 16 entries, the country's second time at the foot of the scoreboard.

Sverre Christophersen was acting as Norwegian commentator for the event, however during the broadcast NRK lost contact with Madrid. Janka Polanyi, who was acting as spokesperson for the Norwegian jury, took over as commentator before NRK decided to connect with the contest via Sveriges Radio TV. Just before the voting began, NRK were able to regain the connection with Christophersen who continued the broadcast.

=== Voting ===
Points awarded to Norway
Score	Country
1 point	Sweden

Points awarded by Norway
Score	Country
3 points	Sweden
2 points	Belgium
1 point	Finland; Germany; Netherlands; Spain; Switzerland
