= Frans de Kok =

Dutch musician (1924–2011)

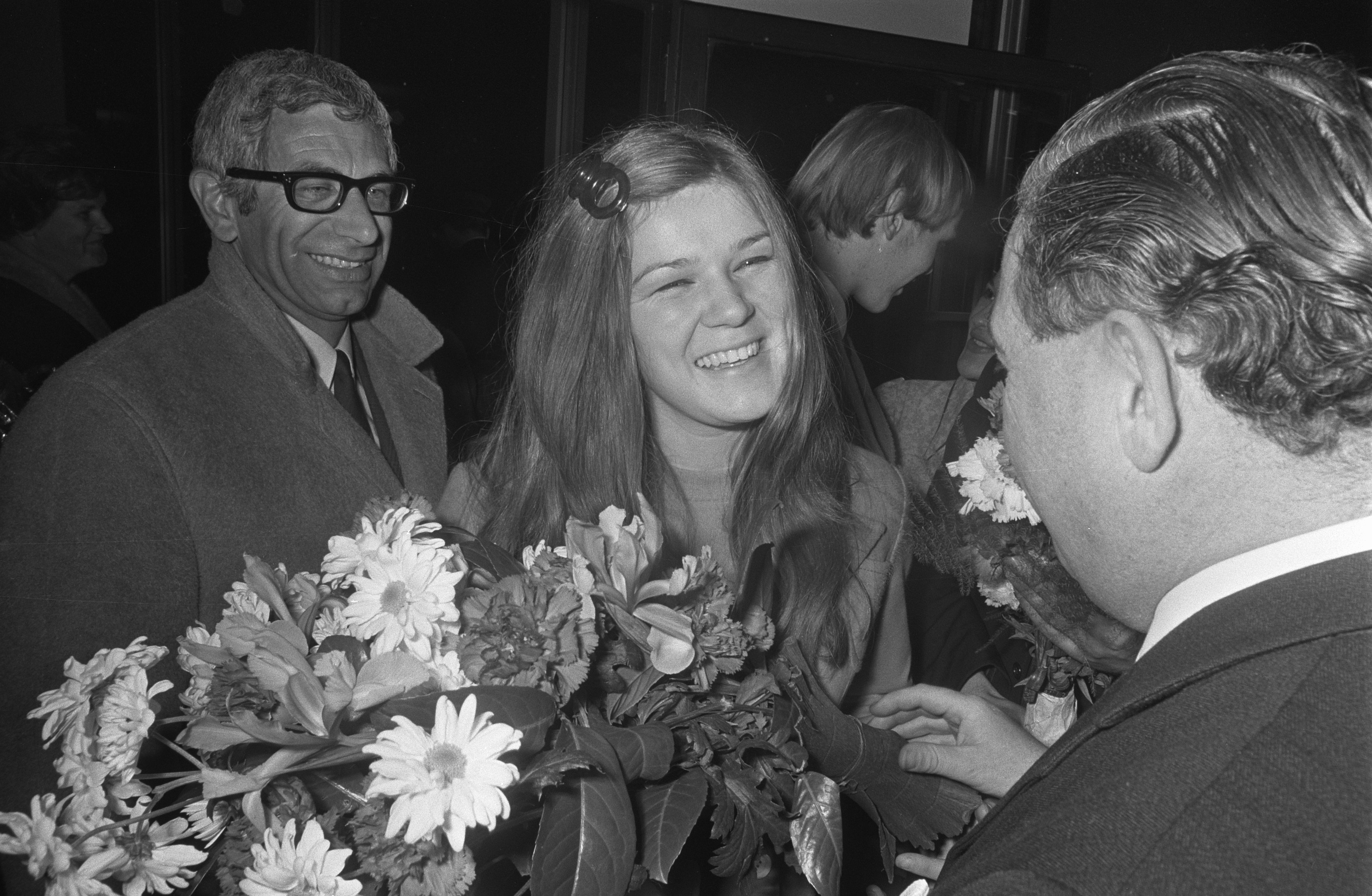
Frans de Kok (left), behind Lenny Kuhr after winning the Eurovision Song Contest 1969

Frans de Kok (18 January 1924 – 4 May 2011) was a Dutch musician. He taught himself to play the piano, the accordion and the bass. In the 1940s and 1950s, he played and arranged music for the Joe Andy Orchestra, which toured the Netherlands, West Germany and Switzerland with considerable success. From 1957 onwards, he worked in various capacities for Dutch television. In 1962, he was asked by TV host and singer Rudi Carrell to accompany his shows with a big orchestra. In the years after, de Kok wrote the arrangements for Carrell's shows and many more TV programmes. Moreover, he worked with a couple of famous Dutch artists in the recording studio, amongst others Boudewijn de Groot. In 1969, he stepped in for Dolf van der Linden who refused to travel to Francoist Spain (saying it would remind him too much of his experiences during World War II) to conduct the orchestra for the Dutch entry in the Eurovision Song Contest. De Kok thus helped Lenny Kuhr winning the contest with her song "De troubadour".

Around the same time, de Kok decided to withdraw from his broadcasting work. He set up a business of record stores in the Netherlands. Later he specialized in computer software. Frans de Kok died in Belgium on Wednesday 4 May 2011.
