= Un jour, un enfant =

1969 song by Frida Boccara

- Album cover

Single by Frida Boccara

from the album Un jour, un enfant
- Language: French
- B-side: "Belle Du Luxembourg"
- Released: 1969
- Genre: Ballad
- Length: 2:42
- Label: Philips
- Composer: Emil Stern
- Lyricist: Eddy Marnay

Eurovision Song Contest 1969 entry
- Country: France
- Artist: Frida Boccara
- Language: French
- Composer: Emil Stern
- Lyricist: Eddy Marnay
- Conductor: Franck Pourcel

Finals performance
- Final result: 1st
- Final points: 18

Entry chronology
- ◄ "La source" (1968)
- "Marie-Blanche" (1970) ►

Official performance video
- "Un jour, un enfant" on YouTube

"Un jour, un enfant" (French pronunciation: [œ̃ ʒuʁ œ̃n‿ɑ̃fɑ̃]; "A Day, a Child") is a song recorded by French singer Frida Boccara, with music composed by Emil Stern and lyrics by Eddy Marnay. It represented France in the Eurovision Song Contest 1969 held in Madrid, and became one of the four winning songs.

Boccara recorded the song in five languages: French, English, German, Spanish, and Italian.

== Background ==
=== Conception ===
"Un jour, un enfant" was written by composer Emil Stern and lyricist Eddy Marnay. The song is a classical ballad, describing the wonders of the world as seen by a child.

Boccara recorded the song in five languages: French, English –as "Through the Eyes of a Child"–, German –"Es schlägt ein Herz für dich", translated: "A Heart Beats for You"–, Spanish –"Un día, un niño", translated: "A Day, a Child"–, and Italian –"Canzone di un amore perduto", translated: "Song of a Lost Love"–.

=== Eurovision ===
The Office de Radiodiffusion Télévision Française (ORTF) internally selected the song as its entrant for the 14th edition of the Eurovision Song Contest.

On 29 March 1969, the Eurovision Song Contest was held at the Teatro Real in Madrid hosted by Televisión Española (TVE), and broadcast live throughout the continent. Boccara performed "Un jour, un enfant" fourteenth on the night, following Germany's "Primaballerina" by Siw Malmkvist and preceding Portugal's "Desfolhada portuguesa" by Simone de Oliveira. Franck Pourcel conducted the live orchestra in the performance of the French entry.

At the close of voting, the song had received 18 points, the same number of points as Spain's "Vivo cantando" by Salomé, the United Kingdom's "Boom Bang-a-Bang" by Lulu, and the Netherlands's "De troubadour" by Lenny Kuhr. As there was no tiebreaker rule in place at the time, all four countries were declared joint winners.

The song was succeeded as (joint) contest winner in 1970 by Ireland's "All Kinds of Everything" by Dana. It was succeeded as French representative that year by "Marie-Blanche" by Guy Bonnet.

=== Aftermath ===
"Un jour, un enfant" was included in Boccara's first studio album of the same name. Boccara performed her song in the Eurovision twenty-fifth anniversary show Songs of Europe held on 22 August 1981 in Mysen.

== Chart history ==
=== Weekly charts ===
Chart (1969)	Peak position
Belgium (Ultratop 50 Wallonia)	24

== Legacy ==
=== Cover versions ===
- ABBA's Agnetha Fältskog covered the song in Swedish on her 1970 solo album Som jag är, under the title "Sov gott, min lilla vän" (translated: "Sleep Well, My Little Friend").
- An instrumental version of the song by Paul Mauriat was used as a theme for the Philippine television drama anthology Lovingly Yours, Helen in 1981.
- Percy Faith included "Through the Eyes of a Child (Un jour, un enfant)" on his 1969 album Love Theme from "Romeo & Juliet".

Preceded by "La, la, la" by Massiel	Eurovision Song Contest winners co-winner with "De troubadour" by Lenny Kuhr, "Vivo cantando" by Salomé and "Boom Bang-a-Bang" by Lulu; 1969	Succeeded by "All Kinds of Everything" by Dana
