= Britt Lindeborg =

Swedish lyricist

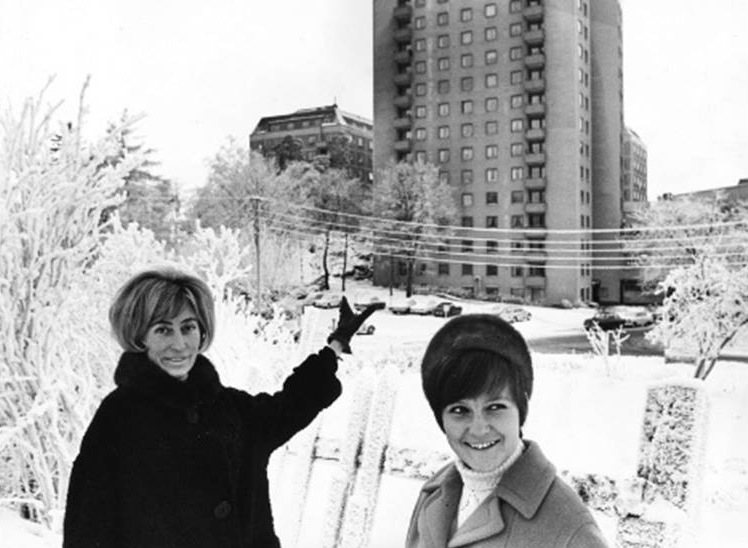
- Born: 22 March 1928; Solna, Sweden
- Died: 5 August 1998 (aged 70); Stockholm, Sweden
- Occupation: lyricist
- Notable work: "Lyckliga gatan"; "Hej, mitt vinterland"; "Judy, min vän"; "Diggi-Loo Diggi-Ley"

Britt Lindeborg (22 March 1928 – 5 August 1998) was a Swedish lyricist.

She was born in Solna Municipality to Gunnar Karlsson and Elsa Sparring. Her greatest success was probably "Lyckliga gatan", a Swedish version of "Il ragazzo della via Gluck", performed by Anna-Lena Löfgren. She wrote the lyrics for "Judy, min vän", the Swedish contribution to the Eurovision Song Contest 1969, and she wrote the lyrics for "Diggi-Loo Diggi-Ley", winner of the Eurovision Song Contest 1984. Lindeborg also wrote the Swedish lyrics for the Lynsey de Paul composed songs "Taste Me" ("Låt dina sinnen få smaka") and "My Man and Me" ("Min man och jag"), both recorded by Agneta Munther. She was inducted into the Swedish Music Hall of Fame in 2017.
