= Germany in the Eurovision Song Contest 1969 =

- Eurovision Song Contest 1969
- Participating broadcaster: ARD (Note: Arbeitsgemeinschaft der öffentlich-rechtlichen Rundfunkanstalten der Bundesrepublik Deutschland) – Hessischer Rundfunk (HR)
- Country: Germany
- Selection process: Ein Lied für Madrid
- Selection date: 22 February 1969

Competing entry
- Song: "Primaballerina"
- Artist: Siw Malmkvist
- Songwriter: Hans Blum

Placement
- Final result: 9th, 8 points

Participation chronology

Germany was represented at the Eurovision Song Contest 1969 with the song "Primaballerina", written by Hans Blum, and performed by Siw Malmkvist. The German participating broadcaster on behalf of ARD, Hessischer Rundfunk (HR), selected its entry through the national final Ein Lied für Madrid.

Ein Lied für Madrid (A Song for Madrid) was held on 22 February at the HR studios in Frankfurt, hosted by Marie-Louise Steinbauer, and with three artists competing: Peggy March, Rex Gildo, and Siw Malmkvist.

== Before Eurovision ==
=== Ein Lied für Madrid ===
Ein Lied für Madrid title card.

Peggy March, Rex Gildo and Siw Malmkvist introduced in the show.

Marie-Louise Steinbauer, the host.

The GEMA chose 30 popular composers and lyricists. These were invited by Hessischer Rundfunk (HR) to submit one or two songs each. Nine of these songs would participate in the national final. Three singers were chosen to participate in the national final: Siw Malmkvist (who had represented Sweden in 1960), Rex Gildo, and Peggy March. All of them were well-known artists in Germany. It is rumoured that actually twelve songs were supposed to be presented and that Alexandra would have been the fourth representative but that she had withdrawn from the competition because Udo Jürgens advised her to do so. However, this has never been confirmed. She later died in July 1969 in a car accident.

==== Final ====
HR held the national final on 22 February 1969 at its studios in Frankfurt, hosted by Marie-Louise Steinbauer. The nine songs were presented in three rounds, with each of three singer performing one song in every round. After every round, the stage was re-decorated. During the show, the host highlighted at various times that the national final was supposed to be a song contest and that it was not the artists who were being voted on.

The winner was chosen in two rounds of voting by a jury of eleven people, composed of deputies of the ARD and an association of composers and lyricists, as well as a conductor. In the first round of voting, the best song of each artist was chosen; every jury member could give one point to his favourite song out of the three. The three chosen songs were sung again before the jury members could vote. Siw Malkvist won with seven points, Peggy March got four and Rex Gildo got no points at all.

The interval act was performed by Rudolf and Mechthild Trautz, European Champions in Latin dancing between 1966 and 1977, who performed a medley of all five international Latin dances: (rhumba, samba, cha cha cha, paso doble, and jive).

28% of the German population watched the show, making it the second most popular program of the evening. However, an evaluation after the show revealed that many people turned off the program during the live broadcast.

Ein Lied für Madrid – first round
R/O	Artist	Song	Composer	Lyricist	Votes	Place	Result
1	Siw Malmkvist	"Dein Comeback zu mir"	Heinz Dietz	Kurt Feltz	2	7	—N/a
2	Rex Gildo	"Lady Julia"	Werner Scharfenberger	Kurt Feltz	4	4	—N/a
3	Peggy March	"Karussell meiner Liebe"	Werner Scharfenberger	Kurt Feltz	1	8	—N/a
4	Siw Malmkvist	"Melodie"	Heinz Korn		4	4	—N/a
5	Rex Gildo	"Die beste Idee meines lebens"	Erich Heinz	Kurt Hertha	7	1	Advanced
6	Peggy March	"Aber die Liebe bleibt bestehn"	Günther Sonneborn	Heinz Korn	4	4	—N/a
7	Siw Malmkvist	"Primaballerina"	Hans Blum		5	3	Advanced
8	Rex Gildo	"Festival der jungen Liebe"	Gerhard Jossenhofen	Horst-Heinz Henning	0	9	—N/a
9	Peggy March	"Hey"	Heinz Korn		6	2	Advanced

Ein Lied für Madrid – second round
Artist	Song	Composer	Lyricist	Votes	Place
Rex Gildo	"Die beste Idee meines lebens"	Erich Heinz	Kurt Hertha	0	3
Siw Malmkvist	"Primaballerina"	Hans Blum		7	1
Peggy March	"Hey"	Heinz Korn		4	2

Only two of the songs in the national final were recorded - the winning song and "Hey" by Peggy March. Both were released as singles and reached the German single charts.

Song	Germany	Austria	Switzerland
"Primaballerina"	13	-	-
"Hey"	29	-	-

== At Eurovision ==
At the Eurovision Song Contest, "Primaballerina" would be the third German entry composed by Hans Blum (he had previously written "Paradies, wo bist du?" in 1965 and "Anouschka" in 1967). Malmkvist was the first female singer for Germany who wore trousers on stage rather than a dress.

=== Voting ===
Each participating broadcaster assembled a jury panel of ten people. Every jury member could give one point to his or her favourite song.

"Primaballerina" received eight points in total and it finished ninth among the 16 entries competing. The highest mark came from the Yugoslav jury, which was the first one to vote and gave three points to Germany, putting the country in the lead. The German jury gave points to three of the four winners (Spain, United Kingdom, Netherlands, and France); only the Dutch entry got no points. It was the second of only four times that Germany gave no points to a winner (the other times being in 1966, 1979, and 2011). For the second year in a row, the highest vote went to Spain.

Points awarded to Germany
Score	Country
3 points	Yugoslavia
2 points	Spain
1 point	Belgium; France; Norway

Points awarded by Germany
Score	Country
3 points	Spain
2 points	Switzerland
1 point	Finland; France; Ireland; Luxembourg; United Kingdom
