= Muriel Day =

Irish singer (b. 1942)

Muriel Day (born 11 January 1942) is an Irish singer. Born in Newtownards, County Down, she was the first singer from Northern Ireland to represent the Republic of Ireland in the Eurovision Song Contest, performing at the 1969 contest. She was also the first woman to perform for Ireland, which had been competing since 1965.

After making her name in the Irish showband circuit, and making an uncredited appearance as a dance hall singer in the British film Billy Liar (1963), Day was chosen as Ireland's Eurovision contestant with the song "The Wages of Love" in 1969. Though the song was a great hit in Ireland, it only finished seventh internationally, in a year with four winners. As a result of her performance, however, she was offered the chance to record with Peter Warne, producing the northern soul hit "Nine Times out of Ten".

Day signed a three-year contract with Dublin record label Dolphin Records in February 1969.

After moving to Canada in 1971, where she continued her career, Day eventually took up medicine and became a laser therapist. She returned to Belfast in the 1990s, where she has been performing regularly. As a guest on RTÉ's The Late, Late Show Eurosong 2015 episode, broadcast on 27 February 2015, Day announced she was about to release her first album. As of 2021 however, this album hasn't been released.

Awards and achievements
Preceded by Pat McGeegan with "Chance of a Lifetime"	Ireland in the Eurovision Song Contest; 1969	Succeeded by Dana with "All Kinds of Everything"
