= Simone de Oliveira =

Portuguese singer and actress (born 1938)

Simone de Oliveira GCIH • GMC
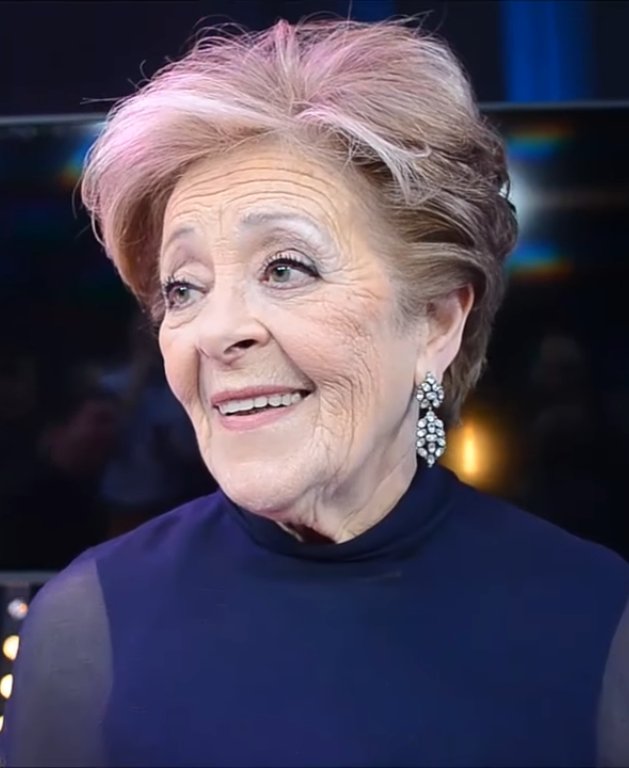
- Simone de Oliveira at Festival da Canção 2015

Background information
- Born: Simone de Macedo e Oliveira; 11 February 1938 (age 88); Lisbon, Portugal
- Occupations: Singer, actress
- Years active: 1958–2022

Simone de Macedo e Oliveira GCIH GCM (born 11 February 1938), better known as Simone de Oliveira, is a Portuguese singer and actress. She represented Portugal at the 1965 and 1969 editions of the Eurovision Song Contest, with the songs "Sol de inverno" and "Desfolhada portuguesa" respectively.

== Early life and career ==
Simone de Oliveira was born and raised in Lisbon. Her Portuguese mother had black African roots in São Tomé and Príncipe (then a Portuguese territory), and her father was Belgian. She started singing in high school.

== Music career ==
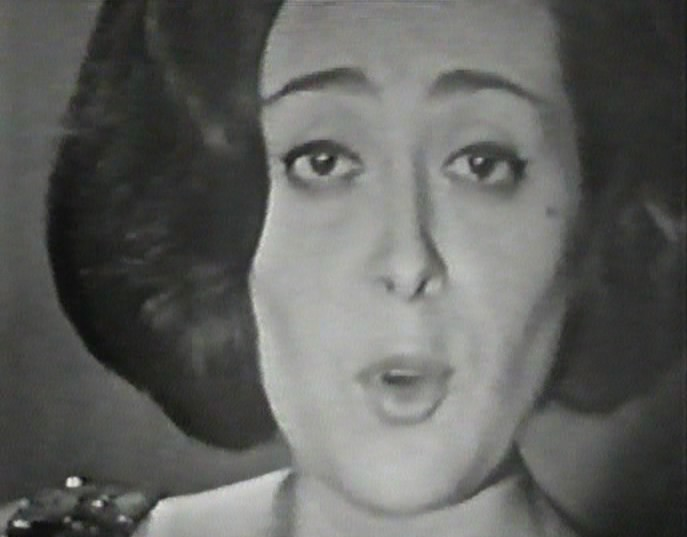
Simone de Oliveira at Eurovision 1965

She started her career at the end of the 1950s.

On 6 February 1965, she won the Grande Prémio TV da Canção Portuguesa 1965 with the song "Sol de inverno". She subsequently represented Portugal at the Eurovision Song Contest 1965 with that song, placing 13th receiving only one point.

In 1968, the released the Quando Me Enamoro EP on Decca PEP 1250. It contained the songs, "Viva O Amor" ("Ein Hoch Der Liebe") by Carl J. Schäuble and Horst Jankowsky, "Nos Meus Braços Outra Vez" ("Come Into My Arms Again") by Barbara Ruskin, "Quando Me Enamoro" ("Quando M'Innammoro") by – Pace, Panzeri and Livraghi, and "Para Cada Um Sua Canção" ("A Chacun Sa Chanson") by J. C. Oliver and R. Valade.

On 24 February 1969, she won the Grande Prémio TV da Canção Portuguesa 1969 with the song "Desfolhada portuguesa". The song, composed by Nuno Nazareth Fernandes with lyrics by José Carlos Ary dos Santos, was a great success in Portugal, having controversial lyrics during the time of the dictatorship of António de Oliveira Salazar. She represented Portugal with the song at the Eurovision Song Contest 1969 in Madrid. Despite her popularity at home, it was not successful at the Eurovision, getting only 4 votes and placing 15th.

In 1980, she was again selected by Radiotelevisão Portuguesa (RTP) to represent Portugal in the ninth edition of the OTI Festival. She performed the song "A tua espera" which got the 14th place with 9 points.

Other successful songs:

- "Maria solidão"
- "Deixa lá"
- "À tua espera"

On 23 September 2017, Simone, o Musical, dedicated to Simone de Oliveira and telling her life story, made its debut at the Teatro Tivoli BBVA in Lisbon. Simone de Oliveira also appeared on stage throughout the musical, and closed the play with the song Apenas o meu povo (“Just my people”).

In 2022, she was announced to be a coach on the generations version of The Voice Portugal alongside Mickael Carreira, Anselmo Ralph, and Bárbara Bandeira. At 84, she became the oldest The Voice coach globally. She returned for her second season as a coach in 2023, with Carreira, Ralph, and Sara Correia.

== Selected filmography ==
=== Theater ===
- A tragédia da Rua das Flores
- Passa por mim no Rossio (a great success in Portugal)
- Maldita cocaína.
- A homage to the singer Madalena Iglésias in the musical play What happened to Madalena Iglésias (another success)
- Alma Mahler-Werfel in Joshua Sobols play Alma (2003, directed by Paulus Manker) in Convento dos Inglesinhos in Lisbon.

=== Acting career ===
Year	Title	Role	Notes
1964	A Canção da Saudade	Herself	
1967	Operação diamante		
1976	Cântico final		
1982	A estrangeira	Clara	

=== Television ===
She has participated in several Portuguese telenovelas:

Date	Title	Role	Network	Notes
1996	Roseira Brava	Amélia Falcão	RTP	
1996/1997	Vidas de Sal	Madalena Fragoso	RTP	
2001/2002	A Senhora das Águas	Maria dos Prazeres	RTP	
2005/2006	Morangos com Açúcar	Maria Antónia Mergulhão	TVI	
2006/2007	Tu e Eu	Raquel Lemos Silva Reis	TVI	
2008	Vila Faia: 25 anos depois	D. Efigénia Marques Vila	RTP	
2022–2023	The Voice Generations	Coach	RTP	

In 1993, Simone was also a jury member in the first season of SIC contest Chuva de Estrelas (the Portuguese version of Stars in Their Eyes), which has uncovered new talents in Portuguese music.

== Personal life ==
Simone is a breast cancer survivor and had the sickness twice.

Awards and achievements
Preceded by António Calvário "Oração"	Portugal in the Eurovision Song Contest; 1965	Succeeded by Madalena Iglésias with "Ele e ela"
Preceded by Carlos Mendes "Verão"	Portugal in the Eurovision Song Contest; 1969	Succeeded by Tonicha with "Menina do alto da serra"
Preceded by José Cid with "Na cabana junto à praia"	Portugal in the OTI Festival; 1980	Succeeded by José Cid with "Uma lagrima"
