= Finland in the Eurovision Song Contest 1969 =

- Eurovision Song Contest 1969
- Participating broadcaster: Yleisradio (Yle)
- Country: Finland
- Selection process: National final
- Announcement date: 4 March 1969

Competing entry
- Song: "Kuin silloin ennen"
- Artist: Jarkko and Laura
- Songwriters: Toivo Kärki; Juha Vainio

Placement
- Final result: 12th, 6 points

Participation chronology

Finland was represented at the Eurovision Song Contest 1969 with the song "Kuin silloin ennen", composed by Toivo Kärki, with lyrics by Juha Vainio, and performed by Jarkko and Laura. The Finnish participating broadcaster, Yleisradio (Yle), selected its entry through a national final.

== Before Eurovision ==
=== National final ===
Six entries were selected for the competition from 266 received submissions. Yleisradio (Yle) held the Finnish national final on 22 February 1969 at its television studios in Helsinki, hosted by Tauno Vainio. The winner was chosen by postcard voting and the results were announced on 4 March 1969.

Final – 22 February 1969
| R/O | Artist | Song | Songwriter(s) | Votes | Place |
|---|---|---|---|---|---|
| 1 | Marion Rung | "Tuntematon sydämeni" | Pentti Lehtonen; Sauvo Puhtila | 1,760 | 6 |
| 2 | Viktor Klimenko | "Vaari sirkuksessa" | Risto Laitinen | 36,880 | 3 |
| 3 | Laila Kinnunen | "Potkis" | Johannes Porvali; Reino Palmroth | 17,100 | 4 |
| 4 | Markku Aro | "Sanoin" | Åke Granholm; Sauvo Puhtila | 5,260 | 5 |
| 5 | Katri Helena | "Maailman pihamaat" | Åke Granholm | 42,160 | 2 |
| 6 | Jarkko and Laura | "Kuin silloin ennen" | Toivo Kärki; Juha Vainio | 85,040 | 1 |

== At Eurovision ==
On the night of the final Jarkko and Laura performed last in the running order, following Portugal. The entry was conducted by Ossi Runne. At the close of voting, Finland picked up 6 points and placed 12th of the 16 entries.

=== Voting ===
Points awarded to Finland
| Score | Country |
|---|---|
| 1 point | Ireland; Germany; Luxembourg; Netherlands; Norway; Spain |

Points awarded by Finland
| Score | Country |
|---|---|
| 3 points | Ireland; Sweden |
| 2 points | Switzerland |
| 1 point | Italy; United Kingdom |
