= Heinz Meier (composer) =

German composer

Heinz Meier (November 18, 1925 - September 22, 1998) was a German composer. He was best known for his 1965 composition "Der Sommerwind", the lyrics of which were later adapted into English as "Summer Wind". The pseudonym "Henry Mayer" was used for numerous of his works.
