= José Carlos Ary dos Santos =

Portuguese poet (1937–1984)

José Carlos Ary dos Santos GOIH
- Born: José Carlos Pereira Ary dos Santos; 7 December 1937; Lisbon, Portugal
- Died: 18 January 1984 (aged 46); Lisbon, Portugal
- Resting place: Alto de São João Cemetery
- Occupations: poet; lyricist; poetry reader
- Writing career
- Language: Portuguese

José Carlos Pereira Ary dos Santos GOIH, better known as José Carlos Ary dos Santos, or simply Ary dos Santos (Lisbon, 7 December 1937^{a} – Lisbon, 18 January 1984) was a Portuguese poet, lyricist, and poetry reader. He published his first book, A liturgia do sangue, in 1963, although his family had already published a book of his poems, Asas, against his will, when he was just 15.

Despite already being a published poet by the time he started writing lyrics, it is through his poetic contribution to popular music that he became well known to the Portuguese public. In his lyrics, many being satirical protest songs, an exalted passionate tone coexists with lyrical rapture.

== Life and work ==
Ary dos Santos was born on 7 December 1937^{a} to a family belonging to the Lisbon upper middle class. His parents were Carlos Ary dos Santos and Maria Bárbara de Castro Pereira. His mother died when he was only 13 years old, something which made a deep impression on him.

When he was only 15, his family published a book of his poetry, Asas, against his will. In 1954, some of his poems were selected for Almeida Garrett Prize Anthology. As he rejected his earlier book, he would consider this his literary debut. At the age of 16, he left his family home. To make ends meet he worked odd jobs, including salesman, errand boy at the Sociedade Nacional de Fósforos, and clerk at the Casino Estoril, until he started his career in advertising. He continued writing poetry, and in 1963, he published the book he would consider his first, A liturgia do sangue.

While Ary dos Santos continued writing and publishing poetry his whole life, it was through his work as a lyricist, especially for satirical songs and for fado, he became well known to the Portuguese public. He is believed to have authored more than 600 lyrics, working with composers such as Nuno Nazareth Fernandes, Alain Oulman, José Mário Branco, Paulo de Carvalho, António Vitorino de Almeida, and Fernando Tordo. With Tordo in particular, he formed a very fruitful songwriting partnership. His lyrics were sung by the most well-respected Portuguese singers, such as Amália Rodrigues, Simone de Oliveira, Carlos do Carmo, Paulo de Carvalho and Fernando Tordo.

Ary dos Santos' public image is also connected to his participation as a lyricist in the RTP Song Festival. He participated multiple times, winning four times: in 1969 with A desfolhada, performed by Simone de Oliveira; in 1971 with Menina, performed by Tonicha; in 1973 with Tourada, performed by Fernando Tordo; and in 1977 with Portugal no coração, performed by Os amigos. The lyrics for A desfolhada were considered scandalous at the time due to the line "he who makes a child does so with pleasure".

Ary dos Santos died on 18 January 1984 of cirrhosis, as a result of his regular heavy drinking.

== Political views ==
Ary dos Santos was a life-long left-wing political activist and Communist Party supporter. In 1969 he supported the Democratic Electoral Commissions campaign and became a member of the Communist Party, then still illegal.

== Bibliography ==
- Asas (1952)
- A liturgia do sangue (1963)
- Tempo da lenda das amendoeiras (1964)
- Azul existe (1964)
- Adereços, endereços (1965)
- Insofrimento in sofrimento (1969)
- Fotos-grafias (1970)
- Resumo (1972)
- As portas que abril abriu (1975)
- O sangue das palavras (1978)
- 20 anos de poesia (1983)
- As palavras das cantigas (1989)
- Obra poética (1994)^{b}

== Discography ==
- Ary por si próprio (1970)
- Cantigas de amigos (1971)
- Poesia política (1974)
- Llanto para Afonso Sastre y todos (1975)
- Bandeira comunista (1977)
- Ary por Ary (1979)
- Ary 80 (1980)

== Notes ==
^a While professionally edited sources generally give his date of birth as 7 December 1937, there are some doubts about this date. His co-worker, friend, and biographer Alberto Bemfeita claims he was born one year earlier, on 7 December 1936, and that he "lied about his birthdate his whole life". According to him, that is the date that appears on his Bilhete de Identidade and birth certificate. Father Gonçalo Portocarrero de Almada, who claims to be his cousin from the "firstborn branch of the family", also writes that he was born on 7 December 1936, and not 1937 "as you can find written on Wikipedia among other places". Another account, published pseudonymously in Diário de Notícias supports the same date of birth.
^b Whenever there is disagreement among the sources cited, the date indicated in the Obra Poética prevails.
