= Spain in the Eurovision Song Contest 1969 =

- Eurovision Song Contest 1969
- Participating broadcaster: Televisión Española (TVE)
- Country: Spain
- Selection process: Artist: Internal selection Song: 1° Festival de la Canción Española
- Selection date: Artist: 17 December 1968; Song: 22 February 1969

Competing entry
- Song: "Vivo cantando"
- Artist: Salomé
- Songwriters: María José de Cerato; Aniano Alcalde

Placement
- Final result: 1st, 18 votes

Participation chronology

Spain was represented at the Eurovision Song Contest 1969 with the song "Vivo cantando", composed by María José de Ceratto, with lyrics by Aniano Alcalde, and performed by Salomé. The Spanish participating broadcaster, Televisión Española (TVE), selected its entry through a national final, after having previously selected the performer internally. The song won the competition in a joint win with the songs from France, the Netherlands, and the United Kingdom. In addition, TVE was also the host broadcaster and staged the event at the Teatro Real in Madrid, after winning the previous edition with the song "La, la, la" by Massiel, becoming the first participating broadcaster to win twice in a row.

== Before Eurovision ==
=== Artist internal selection ===
Televisión Española (TVE) internally selected Salomé as its representative for the Eurovision Song Contest 1969. Her appointment was made public on 17 December 1968. Julio Iglesias and Marisol had also been under consideration.

=== Song national selection ===
TVE organised, in collaboration with Radio Nacional de España (RNE), a national selection to choose the song Salomé would sing at Eurovision. The deadline for submitting songs was 30 January 1969. Of the 210 songs received, the broadcaster selected ten for the televised phase which was staged at the Teatro Balear in Palma de Mallorca. The competition consisted of two semi-finals on 20 and 21 February and a final on 22 February, hosted by Marisa Medina and Joaquín Prat, and aired on TVE 1 and Radio Nacional. The ten candidate songs were performed twice, once by another performer and once by Salomé.

==== Competing entries ====
Song	Artist	Songwriter(s)
"Abrázame otra vez"	Don Castor	Alfredo Domenech; C. Ramos Prada
"Amigos, amigos"	Lorenzo Valverde	Ramón Cinco; Juan Manuel Casado
"Ángelus"	Elena	María Lourdes Martí; Joaquín Bermúdez
"Buenos días"	Adriángela	Esperanza Navarro; León Borrell
"Despertar a tu lado"	Toni Obrador	Miguel Portolés; José Luis Navarro
"Palabras"	Daniel Velázquez	Maryni Callejo; Juan Pardo
"Siento dentro de mí"	Gloria	Fernando Piqueras
"Una vida nueva"	Ivana	Aniano Alcalde
"Vivo cantando"	Ana Kiro	Aniano Alcalde; María José de Ceratto
"Ya viene el día"	Carlos Antonio	José Ignacio Cárdena

==== Semi-finals ====
First semifinal – 20 February 1969
R/O	Artist	R/O	Artist	Song	Result
1	Don Castor	6	Salomé	"Abrázame otra vez"	—N/a
2	Lorenzo Valverde	7	Salomé	"Amigos, amigos"	Qualified
3	Elena	8	Salomé	"Angelus"	—N/a
4	Adriángela	9	Salomé	"Buenos días"	Qualified
5	Toni Obrador	10	Salomé	"Despertar a tu lado"	—N/a

Second semifinal – 21 February 1969
R/O	Artist	R/O	Artist	Song	Result
1	Daniel Velázquez	6	Salomé	"Palabras"	Qualified
2	Gloria	7	Salomé	"Siento dentro de mí"	—N/a
3	Ivana	8	Salomé	"Una vida buena"	Qualified
4	Ana Kiro	9	Salomé	"Vivo cantando"	Qualified
5	Carlos Antonio	10	Salomé	"Ya viene el día"	—N/a

In addition to the song selection, a vote was held to award the "other" singers: the gold medal went to Adriángela with 31 votes, the silver to Ivana with 15 votes, and the bronze to Ana Kiro and Gloria, who tied on five votes.

==== Final ====
The final was held on 22 February 1969. In addition to the competing songs, the show featured guest performances by the ballet of Gisa Geert, Los Valldemosa, Marek and Warek, Ángela and Fred Roby, The Reno's, Franz Joham and Gustavo Re, and Manolo Escobar. Twelve regional juries at RNE stations throughout Spain, (Note: The twelve regional juries were located at the RNE stations in Madrid, Barcelona, Seville, Oviedo, La Coruña, San Sebastián, Murcia, Zaragoza, Valencia, Málaga, Cuenca, and Santa Cruz de Tenerife.) and two juries at the TVE studios in Madrid and Barcelona, cast their vote through telephone. There was a gold, silver, and bronze trophy respectively for the songwriter(s) of the three songs with the most votes.

The winning song was "Vivo cantando", composed by María José de Ceratto, with lyrics by Aniano Alcalde; with "Amigos, amigos", written by Ramón Cinco and Juan Manuel Casado, and "Palabras", written by Maryni Callejo and Juan Pardo, both placing second.

Final – 22 February 1969
R/O	Artist	R/O	Artist	Song	Votes	Place
1	Lorenzo Valverde	6	Salomé	"Amigos, amigos"	8	2
2	Adriángela	7	Salomé	"Buenos días"	4	4
3	Daniel Velázquez	8	Salomé	"Palabras"	8	2
4	Ivana	9	Salomé	"Una vida nueva"	3	5
5	Ana Kiro	10	Salomé	"Vivo cantando"	47	1

== At Eurovision ==
The Eurovision Song Contest 1969 was hosted by TVE on 29 March 1969 at the Teatro Real in Madrid. Salomé performed "Vivo cantando" third in the running order, following Luxembourg and preceding Monaco. She was accompanied by Los Valldemosa –brothers Rafael, Tomeu, and Bernat Estaràs– as backing singers. Augusto Algueró –the event's musical director– conducted the event's orchestra performance of the Spanish entry. The song received 18 votes, tying for first place with France, the Netherlands, and the United Kingdom. All four countries were declared joint winners. This was the first time that there was a tie in the Eurovision Song Contest and the first time that a country, Spain, won two years in a row.

The contest was broadcast on TVE 1, TVE 2, and TVE Canarias, with commentary by José Luis Uribarri. It was also aired on Radio Nacional, Radio Juventud, Radio Popular, and on select Cadena SER radio stations. Before the event, TVE aired a talk show hosted by Jesús Álvarez introducing the Spanish jury from Prado del Rey, which continued after the contest commenting on the results.

=== Voting ===
TVE assembled a jury panel with ten members, with each member giving one vote to their favourite song. The following members comprised the Spanish jury:

- Álvaro de Laiglesia – writer, humorist, and director of La Codorniz (chairperson)
- Paquita Crespo – student
- Pilar Suárez – student
- Román Alcalá – student
- José Luis García Montero – student
- Andrés Sobrevalls Piró – agricultural worker
- José Ramón Barrera Hevia – metalworker
- Luis Sánchez Arguindey – college director
- Carmen Debén – journalist
- Manuel Gil – actor

Votes awarded to Spain
Score	Country
3 votes	Belgium; Germany; Monaco
2 votes	France; Luxembourg; Portugal
1 vote	Ireland; Norway; Yugoslavia

Votes awarded by Spain
Score	Country
2 votes	Belgium; Germany; Monaco; Portugal
1 vote	Finland; Yugoslavia
