= Jarkko and Laura =

Finnish musical duo

Jarkko & Laura
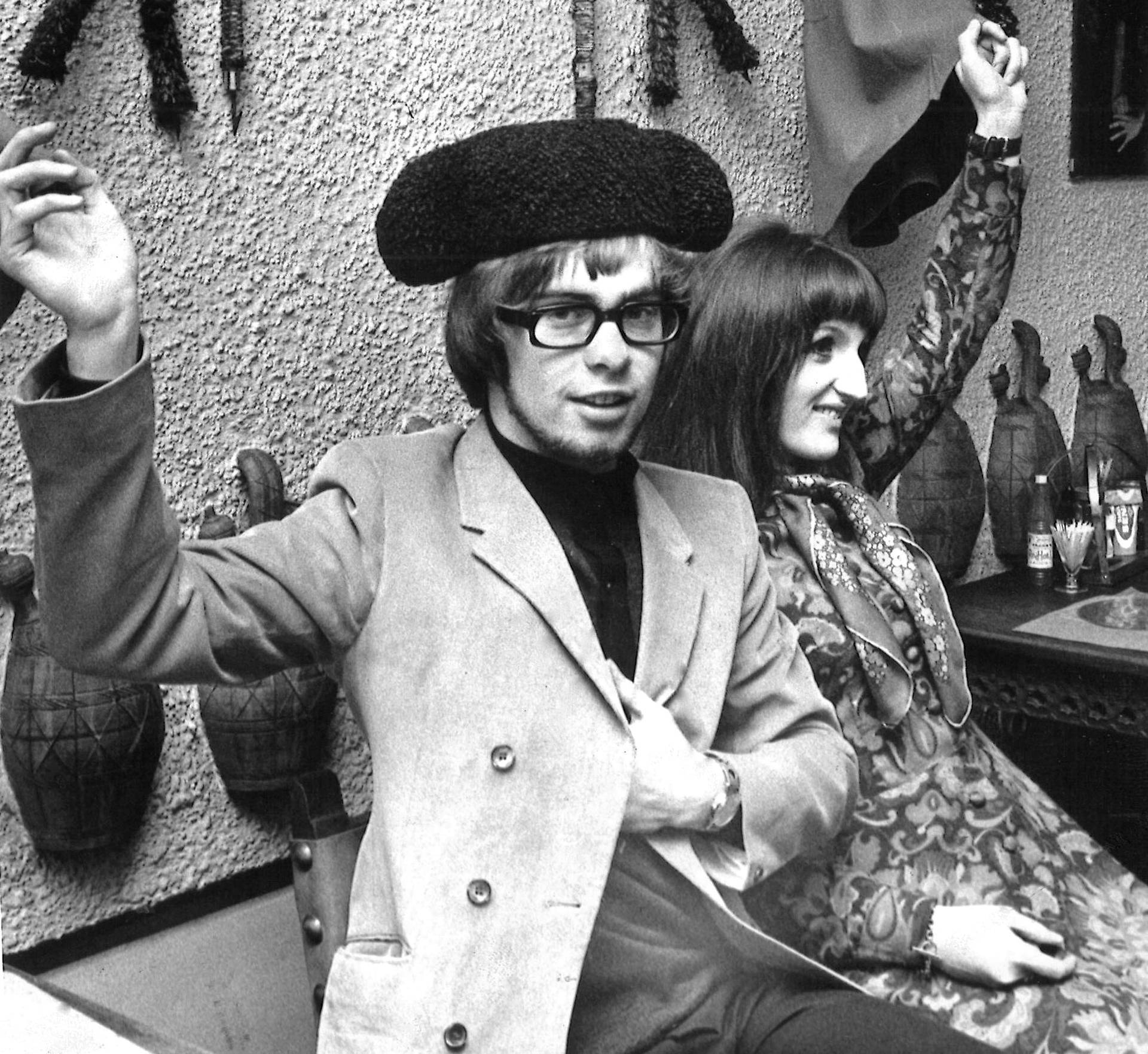

Background information
- Origin: Helsinki, Finland
- Genres: Schlager; Pop Music
- Years active: 1966–2025
- Label: Scandia
- Members: Jarkko Antikainen, Laura Antikainen (Ruotsalo until 1969)
- Website: Official Website

Jarkko ja Laura (English: Jarkko and Laura) were a Finnish pop-duo. They first had their break on the Finnish music scene in 1966, with a mildly successful song written by Laura, "Meidän laulumme". From then on, they released many singles, along with a few covers of English songs such as "The Windmills of Your Mind", "Cinderella Rockefella", "Lament of the Cherokee Reservation", which were popular at the time.

They were chosen to represent Finland in the Eurovision Song Contest 1969 in Spain with the song Kuin silloin ennen (Like in Those Times). They beat out now popular Finnish singer, Katri Helena, in the national final by just a few thousand postcard votes. In Madrid, they placed 12th in the voting results. Shortly after the contest, they got married.

After their participation in the Eurovision Song Contest, they released singles continually until 1972. More currently, Jarkko was a photographer and Laura is still performing music. She released an album in 2004, called "Tyttö kaupungista" (Translates roughly in English as: "City girl").

Jarkko Antikainen died on 18 October 2025, at the age of 75.

Preceded by Kristina Hautala with Kun kello käy	Finland in the Eurovision Song Contest; 1969	Succeeded by Markku Aro & Koivistolaiset with Tie uuteen päivään
