= Lenny Kuhr =

Dutch-Israeli singer-songwriter (born 1950)

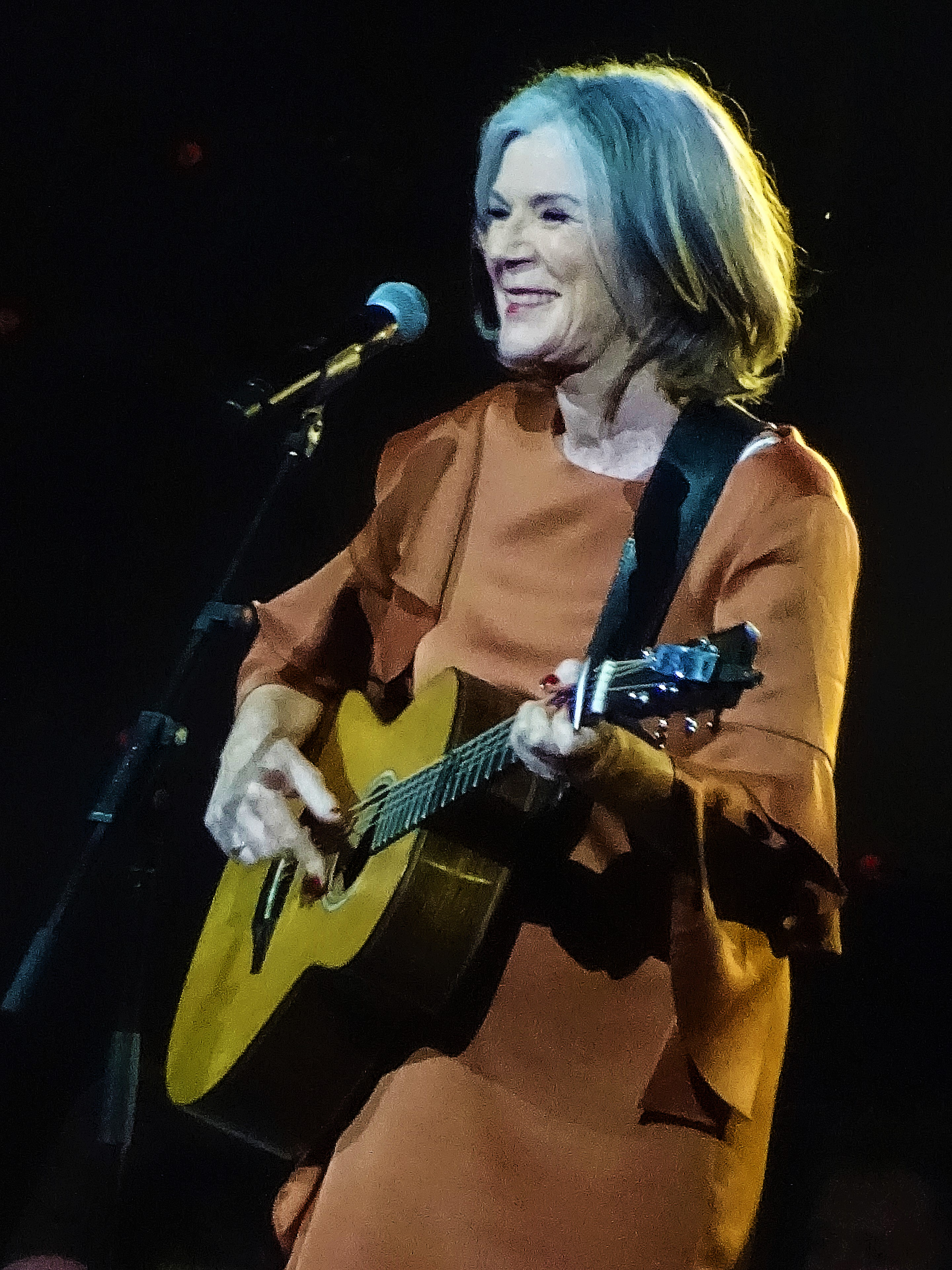
- Kuhr at Het Grote Songfestivalfeest in 2019

Background information
- Born: Helena Hubertina Johanna Kuhr; 22 February 1950 (age 76); Eindhoven, Netherlands
- Occupation: Singer-songwriter
- Spouse(s): Gideon Bialystock (m. 1974; div. 1981) Rob Frank (m. 2003)

Helena Hubertina Johanna "Lenny" Kuhr (born 22 February 1950) is a Dutch-Israeli singer-songwriter. She was one of the four winners of the Eurovision Song Contest 1969, representing the Netherlands with the song "De troubadour". Kuhr is a converted Jew and immigrated to Israel in November 2026.

== Career ==
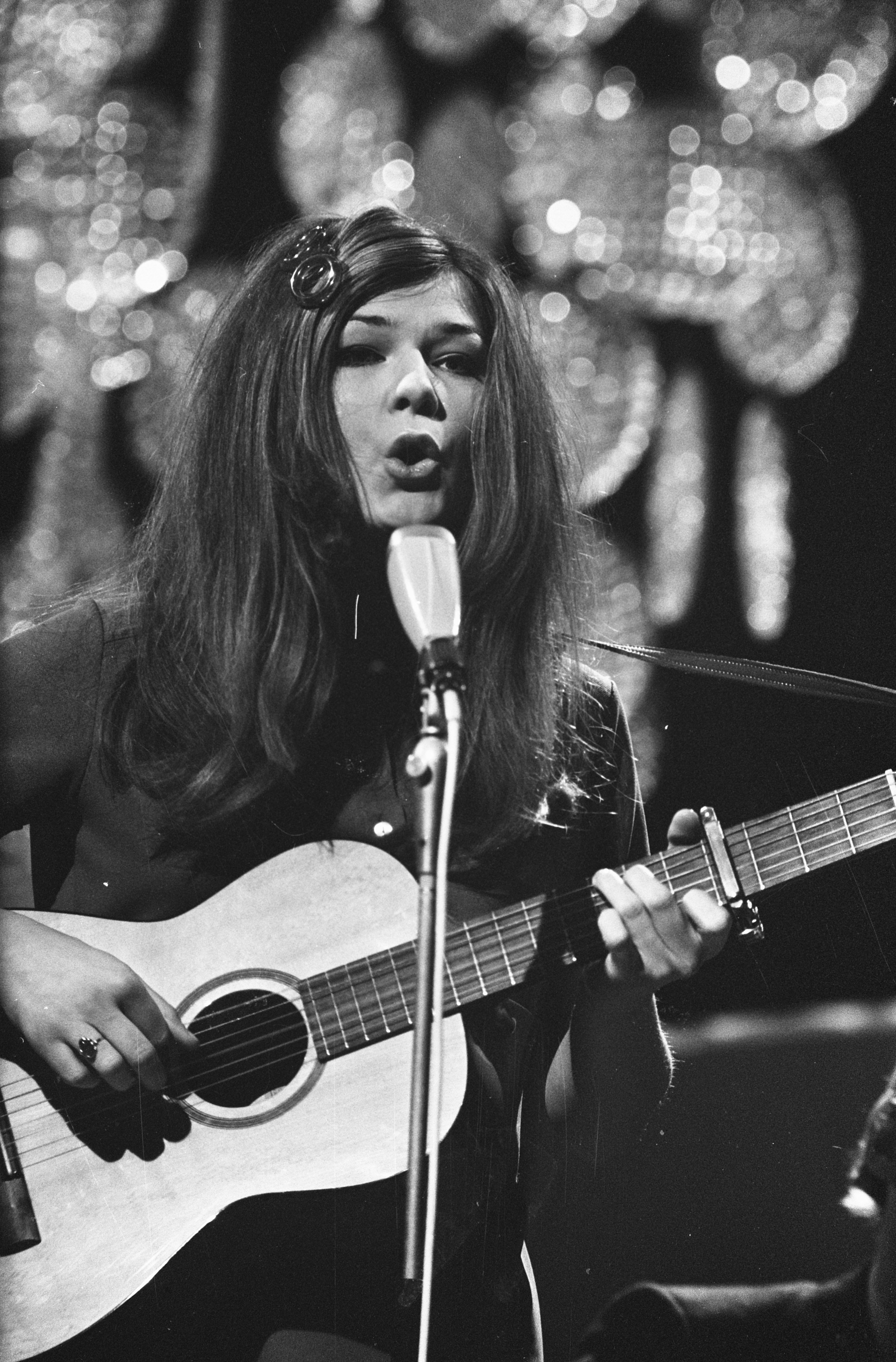
Lenny Kuhr at the Nationaal Songfestival in 1969

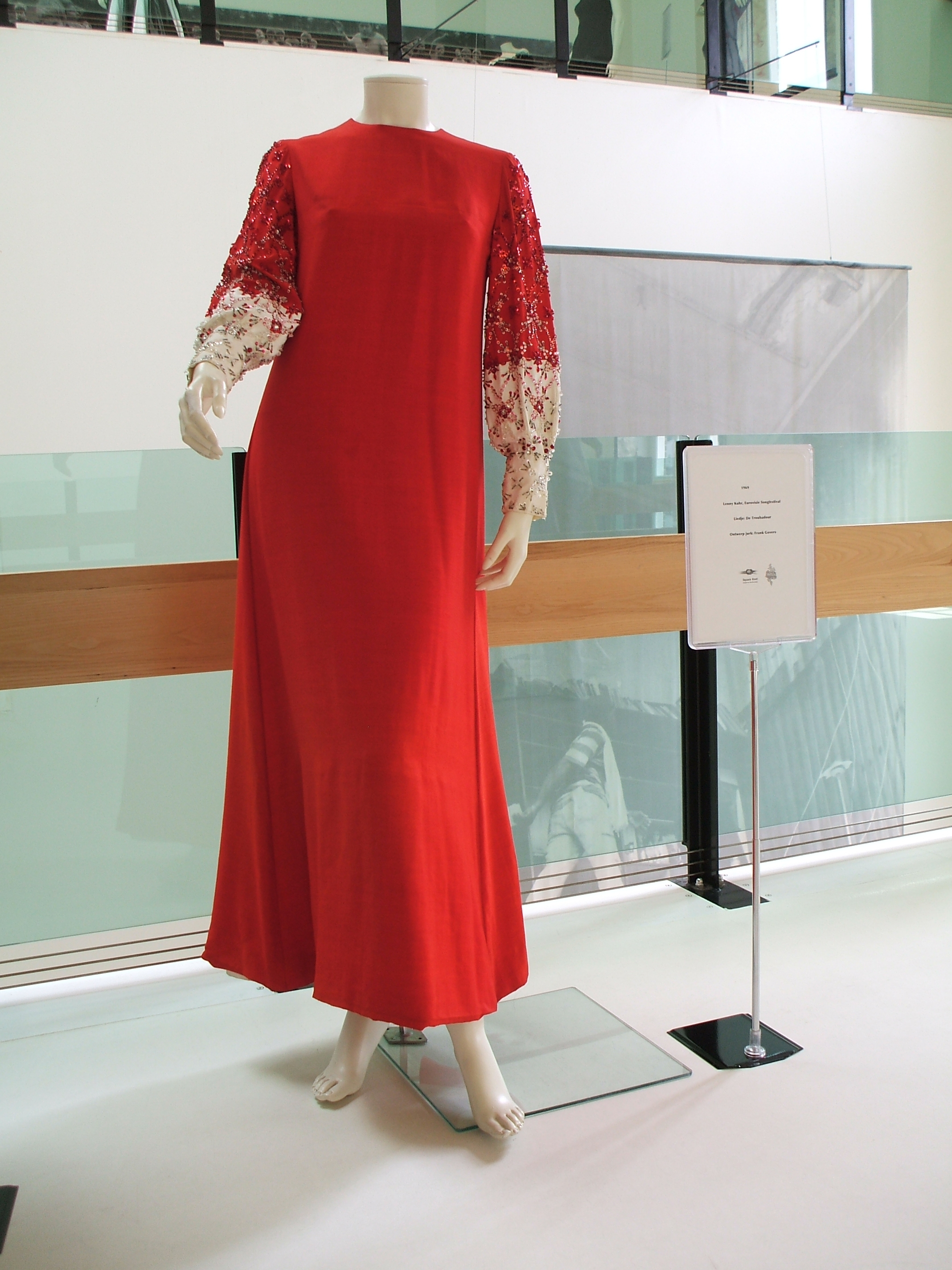
Lenny Kuhr's Eurovision Song Contest 1969 dress

In 1967, she started a singing career in the Netherlands, performing songs in the French chanson tradition. She represented the Netherlands in the Eurovision Song Contest 1969 with her composition "De troubadour" (lyrics by David Hartsema; orchestra conducted by Franz de Kok). She was one of the four winners that year.

In the early 1970s, Kuhr was more successful in France than in her home country. In 1970, she toured with Georges Brassens. Late 1971, she had a top 10 hit in France with "Jesus Cristo".

In 1980, she had her biggest hit in the Netherlands: "Visite", a song she performed with the French group Les Poppys. She has been releasing records ever since, though without major chart success.

Lenny Kuhr was one of the artists who recorded the song "Shalom from Holland" (written by Simon Hammelburg and Ron Klipstein) as a token of solidarity with the Israeli people, threatened by missiles from Iraq, during the Gulf War in 1991.

Lenny Kuhr performed "De troubadour" during the final of the Eurovision Song Contest 2021 in Rotterdam, in a segment called "Rock the Roof", together with other Eurovision winners. Kuhr later recorded the song in five additional languages: English, French, German, Spanish, and Italian.

In March 2024, Kuhr was heckled while on stage by pro-Palestine activists during a concert in Waalwijk. In February 2026, Kuhr announced that she would retire from performing and move to Israel after May.

== Personal life ==
In May 1973, Kuhr was assaulted while waiting for a train at Haarlem railway station, suffering a nasal fracture that required surgical repair. The following year, she married the Israeli doctor who had performed the operation and subsequently converted to Judaism. Together they had two daughters before emigrating to Israel in 1980. The marriage ended in divorce just one year later, prompting her return to the Netherlands in 1981.

After her divorce, Kuhr was romantically involved with songwriter Herman Pieter de Boer from 1981 to 1993. She married for the third time in 2003 to Robert Frank.

In October 2023, Kuhr's grandson was injured while serving in the Israeli military during the Gaza war. Kuhr has publicly sympathised with Israel in the context of the war. In 2026, she announced that she and her husband would emigrate to Israel, stating that their decision was motivated by concerns over growing antisemitism in the Netherlands. On November 9, 2026, Kuhr and her husband landed in Israel, where they were welcomed by the Director-General of the Ministry of Aliyah and Integration.

== Discography ==
- 1969: Lenny Kuhr
- 1971: De zomer achterna
- 1972: Tout ce que j'aime / Les enfants
- 1972: De wereld waar ik van droom
- 1974: God laat ons vrij
- 1976: 'n Dag als vandaag
- 1980: Dromentrein
- 1981: Avonturen
- 1982: Oog in oog
- 1983: De beste van Lenny Kuhr (compilation album)
- 1986: Quo vadis
- 1988: Lenny Kuhr (compilation album)
- 1990: Het beste van Lenny Kuhr (compilation album)
- 1990: De blauwe nacht
- 1992: Heilig vuur
- 1994: Altijd heimwee
- 1997: Gebroken stenen (also released in German as Gebrochene Steine)
- 1997: Stemmen in de nacht
- 1999: Oeverloze liefde
- 2000: Visite (compilation album)
- 2001: Hollands glorie (compilation album)
- 2001: Fadista
- 2004: Op de grens van jou en mij
- 2005: Panta Rhei
- 2007: 40 Jaar verliefd (live album)
- 2010: Hollands glorie (compilation album)
- 2010: Mijn liedjes mijn leven (CD/DVD boxset)
- 2011: Liefdeslied
- 2013: Wie ben je
- 2017: Gekust door de eeuwigheid
- 2019: Het lied gaat door
- 2021: Favorieten Express (compilation album)
- 2022: Lenny Kuhr

Awards and achievements
Preceded by (Spain) Massiel with "La, la, la"	Winner of the Eurovision Song Contest; 1969 (tied with (United Kingdom) Lulu, (Spain) Salomé & (France) Frida Boccara)	Succeeded by (Republic of Ireland) Dana with "All Kinds of Everything"
Preceded by Ronnie Tober with "Morgen"	Netherlands in the Eurovision Song Contest; 1969	Succeeded by Hearts of Soul with "Waterman"
