= Jazz of Birmingham =

Jazz music scene in Birmingham, UK

Jazz is a popular musical style in Birmingham and has been so since the 1920s. Venues such as the Birmingham Palais pioneered British jazz and lead to the establishment of a string of jazz clubs in the city such as The Rhythm Club and the Hot Club. Today jazz remains a prominent part of the cities culture; events such as the Harmonic Festival, the Mostly Jazz Festival and the annual International Jazz Festival run each year along with Birmingham Jazz, an organisation that promotes and commissions dozens of jazz concerts every year.

== Early jazz ==
Jazz has been popular in Birmingham since the 1920s, an era when interest in the music within England was otherwise largely confined to London. The Birmingham Palais was one of the pioneering venues of British jazz and opened in Ladywood in 1920, hosting early touring bands from the United States such as the Frisco Jazz Band in 1920, Benny Peyton's Jazz Kings in 1921, the Paramount Six and the Southern Rag-a-Jazz Orchestra in 1922, and Bill Shenkman's Buffalo Orchestra in 1923. The Palais also maintained its own resident bands that combined notable visiting American musicians such as Sidney Bechet and Emile Christian with emerging local musicians who would go on to establish the native British jazz tradition, such as Bill Harty, Billy Jones, Jack Raine, and Jack Payne.

== Post-war jazz ==
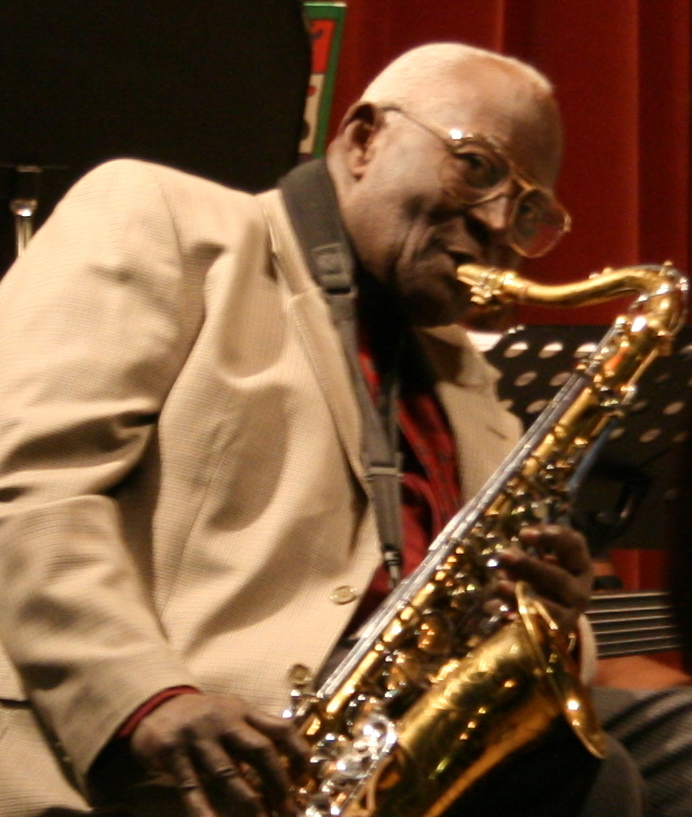
Andy Hamilton

Jazz was still largely unknown in other cities outside London when it was revived in Birmingham in the late 1940s. A highly successful series of jazz concerts were held at Birmingham Town Hall from 1946, and the city's jazz clubs re-emerged with the opening of the Rhythm Club and the Hot Club in 1948.

From the late 1980s the saxophonist Julian Argüelles and his brother drummer Steve Argüelles were major players in contemporary European jazz.

== Contemporary jazz ==
The Harmonic Festival, the Mostly Jazz Festival and the annual International Jazz Festival run alongside the year-round contemporary programme presented by promoters and development agency Birmingham Jazz, directed by Tony Dudley-Evans. The musician-led Cobweb Collective also present regular jazz sessions in several venues around the city. Many other venues support the jazz scene in the city, often promoted by Birmingham Jazz. Jazz musicians associated with the city include Andy Hamilton, Soweto Kinch, Ronnie Ball, Tony Kinsey, Douglas "Dougle" Robinson and King Pleasure and the Biscuit Boys, a group formed in 1986 around saxophonist-singer Mark Skirving (born 13 March 1966, pseudonym "King Pleasure") (Note: Unrelated to King Pleasure (March 24, 1922 - March 21, 1981)) originally called Some Like it Hot (later The Satellites) before assuming the current (as of 2015) name.

The busiest promoter of contemporary jazz in the city is the voluntary organisation Birmingham Jazz, which mounts dozens of concerts every year featuring local, national and international artists in venues such as the CBSO Centre, the mac arts centre, the Glee Club and Symphony Hall. It enjoys the support of the city council and the Arts Council of England and also commissions new works from both local performers and performers of international standing. Birmingham is also home to Eastside Jazz Club, located at the Royal Birmingham Conservatoire.

== Bibliography ==
- Chilton, John, ed. (2004), Who's Who of British Jazz (2nd ed.), New York: Continuum International Publishing Group, ISBN 0826472346
- Toynbee, Jason (2005), "Birmingham", in Shepherd, John; Horn, David; Laing, Dave (eds.), Continuum Encyclopedia of Popular Music of the World, vol. 7, New York: Continuum, pp. 354–355, ISBN 0826474365
