= Bob and Alf Pearson =

English musical variety double act

- Bob (left) would usually appear seated at the piano, as here

Background information
- Born: 15 August 1907, Sunderland, County Durham, England (Bob); 15 June 1910, Sunderland, County Durham, England (Alf)
- Origin: Sunderland, County Durham, England
- Died: 30 December 1985 (aged 78), Sunderland, Tyne and Wear, England (Bob); 7 July 2012 (aged 102), London, England (Alf)
- Genres: Vocal; jazz; British dance band; traditional pop
- Instruments: Vocals and piano
- Years active: 1927–1985
- Labels: Columbia, Piccadilly, Broadcast, Imperial, Rex, Parlophone
- Past members: Bob Pearson; Alf Pearson

Bob and Alf Pearson were an English musical variety double act, consisting of brothers Robert Alexander Pearson (15 August 1907 – 30 December 1985) and Alfred Vernon Pearson (15 June 1910 – 7 July 2012), who were mainly known for their singing of songs as a duo in close-harmony. Their career together lasted over 50 years, spanning stage, radio, television and gramophone records.

During the 1930s, they became one of the most popular acts in Britain, and had sold over a million records by 1936. Their fame continued into the post-war period, when they regularly appeared on the BBC Radio show Ray's a Laugh with comedian Ted Ray. Introducing themselves with their signature tune, "My Brother and I", audiences heard the brothers performing well-known songs, with Bob accompanying on piano. Ray would ask, "Why, it's a little girl, what's your name?" with Bob replying, "Jennifer", followed by a comedy routine. Bob's turn as 'Jennifer' became closely associated with their act.

== Early lives ==
Bob and Alf Pearson were both born in Sunderland, then part of County Durham, in the north-east of England, where they also grew up. Their father, Edwin Arthur Pearson, was a plasterer, but their mother, Emily Smiles (performing under her maiden name), was a contralto singer who belonged to the Moody-Manners Opera Company.

Bob, the older of the two, was born on 15 August 1907, whilst three years later, on 15 June 1910, Alf was born; they also had two younger sisters. The duo started as choir boys in Sunderland's Christ Church choir, in which the principal treble soloist was Bob. When his voice broke, Alf took on the role. At the North of England Music Festival in 1921, with composer Ralph Vaughan Williams as adjudicator, Bob was winner of the Boys' Solo class; in 1924, three years later, Alf also won the prize.

As soon as the brothers left school (aged 14), they were put to work as apprentices in their father's plastering business, and would sing while they worked around houses in Wearside. Alf's first professional engagement was as a teenage boy in 1924, singing "Oh! Susanna" in the musical prologue before the film The Covered Wagon at the King's Theatre in Sunderland. When his voice broke, he began to sing with a St Gabriel's Church group, the Blue Boys, whilst Bob was training to be a classical pianist. Realising that he could not play on the pianos in church halls, Bob suggested they sing duets, finishing with Negro spirituals such as "I Got a Robe", "Tis You O Lawdy" and "Standing in the Need of Prayer". As Alf later recalled, "That's what we did and so we had an act before we came to London. Whenever the Blue Boys was advertised, the place was full." It was in 1927 that their duet act was born, and they began appearing at amateur shows and parties across the north-east of England. Bob would sing tenor from the piano, as he accompanied Alf in close harmony.

== Career ==
=== Early years ===
In 1928, when their father Arthur got a contract for a new house-building development at Tolworth on the Kingston bypass, the family moved to Surrey, and the brothers performed on stage in music halls. Emily entered them in a nationwide talent contest, in which first prize was a recording contract with Columbia Records and 50 copies of the winner's song. They sang "Singin' in the Rain" and "Ol' Man River", and won the competition. However, as Columbia already had a singing duo, Layton & Johnstone, it was suggested that Bob and Alf instead be signed to Regal. Their recording manager asked them to copy the style of two Americans, but the brothers said it was "too simple" for their tastes, as it featured singing in thirds for the whole duration. The manager responded, "That is the way that people like it. I can sell thousands of records if you sing like that." Bob and Alf apologised, saying they didn't sing like that, and left.

Instead, the Pearsons were signed up by Piccadilly to make records; these were played on BBC Radio by Christopher Stone, who had become Britain's first disc jockey in 1927. The brothers were also booked for their own broadcast on BBC Radio's Saturday night Music Hall programme. During this period, the duo appeared on air with the well-known bandleader Ambrose on Saturday nights from The May Fair Hotel.

=== Fame ===
Following the Columbia competition, music publisher Bert Feldman heard Bob and Alf singing and came up with a publicity stunt. The Pearsons were asked to see Frank Reubens, Feldman's manager, with the message that he would have "something for them". In January 1930, they arrived to a room filled with journalists and the bandleader Jack Hylton. Reubens told the assembled press that he had heard two plasterers singing, and was so impressed that had introduced them to Hylton, who was going to sign them up to sing with his band. The ruse worked, and nearly every newspaper carried the story, helping to establish the brothers as a name.

The Pearsons were invited by John Logie Baird to appear on BBC Television twice weekly, when the medium was in its infancy. Consequently, they became the first duo to be seen on the small screen. The shows were produced at Baird's studio in Long Acre, in central London. Alf later recalled, "There were only about 400 sets in the country and the picture was the size of a cigarette card." They were also engaged for a six-week season at the London Coliseum, and began to make a name for themselves, appearing at the country's top theatres.

Despite their initial setback with Columbia, the brothers had also started a prolific recording career, with regular releases during the early 1930s on Broadcast, Imperial and Rex. On many of these records, Bob accompanied the pair's vocals on piano. These labels also issued records by British dance bands such as Harry Bidgood, Jack Payne and Jay Wilbur, which featured the duo singing a (usually uncredited) vocal refrain; occasionally, however, Bob or Alf would appear on the disc as a solo vocalist. During this period, they also continued to broadcast on BBC Radio, including to overseas listeners on the BBC Empire Service (later to become the World Service).

The Pearsons recorded several songs in the 1930s which would prove durable when revived by other artists in later decades: "Walkin' My Baby Back Home", a hit for Johnnie Ray in 1952, "You're Driving Me Crazy", a number 1 for The Temperance Seven in 1961 and "Tears", which topped the charts for Ken Dodd in 1965. From 1932 to 1938, they appeared in a series of short films for Pathé News, singing songs in newsreels seen by cinema audiences. During World War II, they formed a concert troupe with ENSA, performing at army bases and singing for troops across Europe and Africa.

=== Post-war years ===
Following the war, the establishment of the Light Programme on BBC Radio, specialising in light entertainment and music, provided further opportunities for the Pearsons. They appeared on variety shows such as Seaside Nights (on the BBC Home Service), Second House, Round The Halls, Music-Hall and had guest spots on The Happidrome. In 1947, they were initiated into the Grand Order of Water Rats, a British entertainment industry fraternity and charitable organisation. That Christmas, whilst appearing at the Glasgow Empire, the duo heard from comedian Ted Ray, informing the brothers that he had specified their names when asked who he wanted for his radio show. Prior to it starting, they had two slots on the Home Service in Scotland, billed as "Brothers in harmony".

Ray's a Laugh, starring Ted Ray, began on Monday 4 April 1949 at 7.30 pm, and was broadcast weekly on the Home Service, as well as being repeated on the Light Programme. It was later moved to Tuesday and then Thursday nights, with Bob and Alf Pearson as regular stars. The show also featured a young Peter Sellers. During the show, they would sing songs and appear in sketches, most notably with Bob playing the part of a little girl, 'Jennifer'. Another part of the show would feature a comedic dialogue between the fictional Mrs 'Oskins and her friend Ivy, with the former announcing, "Oooh, it's agony Ivy!" The Pearsons' last appearance on the programme was in July 1951.

In July 1949, shortly after their Ray's a Laugh debut, the duo's first recordings in over ten years were issued on the Parlophone label. Occasionally working with a young producer named George Martin, who had joined EMI in 1950, their regular single releases included recordings of songs such as "Red Roses for a Blue Lady", "Careless Hands" and "In a Golden Coach (There's a Heart of Gold)", a song composed for the Coronation of Elizabeth II. They also recorded a number of medleys: at the time, the LP and 7-inch single, which had longer playing times, and could thus contain more tracks, were still fairly new. The 10-inch 78 rpm disc was still dominant at the time, but could typically only hold three minutes on each side. A medley featuring several songs on each side of a disc could therefore allow the listener to hear half a dozen songs on record. Continuing a theme of their earlier records, Bob and Alf released a number of medleys in series' such as "In Big Bits of Big Hits" and "Family Favourites". Their final recording was a two-sided medley, "Christmas Favourites For Children", issued in December 1953. Around this time, they also toured with a stage version of the radio show Take It from Here.

During 1953, the Pearsons were regulars in The Pleasure Boat, a Light Programme series which also starred Anne Shelton and Julie Andrews. They were later joined by future Doctor Who star Jon Pertwee heading the cast. In the early 1950s, they continued to make regular appearances on radio shows such as Blackpool Night, The Frankie Howerd Show, Midday Music-Hall, Workers' Playtime and Variety Playhouse. There were also a number of BBC Television broadcasts: in 1955 and 1956 they starred in two one-off programmes in which they sung songs written by members of the public. With the dawn of rock and roll in the mid-1950s, their work dried up. However, they remained active as performers, and from 1958 to 1960 they had a regular slot on Join in and Sing, in which they were heard "singing songs you all know" on the Light Programme.

The Pearsons' association with the Light Programme continued into the 1960s, via appearances on shows such as Music Hall and A Night at the Music Hall. In 1966, they featured on Looking High, High, High, a series hosted by Bryan Johnson, named after his Eurovision entry. The same year, they appeared as guests on the BBC's long-running Desert Island Discs radio series. In 1969, the duo took part in the official opening night of colour television on ITV, when they performed on Frost on Saturday.

In the 1970s, the Pearsons were amongst the stars of Those Golden Years of Music Hall, a nostalgic variety show at Eastbourne. Alongside a varying cast which included Elsie and Doris Waters, fellow Sunderland performer Nat Jackley, Margery Manners, Walter Landauer of Rawicz and Landauer, Leslie Sarony and Lester Ferguson, it did five summer seasons in the seaside resort. The show also toured at the end of each season, reaching South Africa, Rhodesia, New Zealand and Canada.

== Personal lives ==
Bob married Vera Pauline Johnson (1905–1993) in Sunderland on 8 June 1932. Alf did not marry, remarking, "My brother's wife, Vera, wasn't very open to the idea of there being another lady. I liked the company of girls and girls liked me as well. But Vera didn't want another lady in with Bob and Alf Pearson."

== Later years and deaths ==
In October 1985, the brothers sang a medley of World War II songs on the television series Highway, hosted by Harry Secombe. Bob died in his home town of Sunderland, where he had been living, on 30 December, aged 78, bringing the curtain down on their act after more than 50 years.

Alf appeared in the pilot episode of the BBC television sitcom You Rang, M'Lord? as a call boy in 1988. Continuing his association with the Grand Order of Water Rats, he raised £900 by donating two of his art works for auction; he had begun painting as a hobby in the early 1980s. He became King Rat (head of the charity) in 1997, the year which marked 50 years of his involvement with the Rats. In 2001, the first CD compilation of Bob and Alf's recordings, My Brother And I, was released. The collection was co-ordinated by skiffle musician and fellow Water Rat Chas McDevitt, who also wrote the sleeve notes, and, at the age of 91, Alf's voice could be heard linking the tracks.

In 2007, after 30 years living on his own in Surbiton, Alf moved into Brinsworth House in Twickenham, the retirement home for showbusiness professionals in south-west London. It was here that, in 2010, he celebrated his 100th birthday with a party held by the Water Rats. He died in London on 7 July 2012, at the age of 102.

== Discography ==
Aside from their numerous 78 rpm singles, there have been three albums collecting recordings by Bob and Alf Pearson – all titled My Brother and I after the opening of their Ray's a Laugh signature tune. They recorded no studio albums.

=== Compilations ===
- My Brother And I (Evergreen Melodies EVR27, cassette, 1993)
- My Brother And I (Rollercoaster RCCD 6005, CD, 2001)
- My Brother And I (Windyridge VAR89, CD, 2018)
