= Helen Clare =

English singer (1916–2018)

- Born: Nelly Harrison; 29 November 1916; Bradford, Yorkshire, England
- Died: 15 September 2018 (aged 101) London, England
- Genres: Vocal; jazz; British dance band; traditional pop
- Instruments: Vocals
- Labels: Rex, Decca, Regal Zonophone
- Website: Helen Clare

Helen Clare (born Nelly Harrison; 29 November 1916 – 15 September 2018) was a British singer who was well known in the 1930s and 1940s through her work in variety, radio, television and recording. Clare worked extensively in light entertainment, appearing on BBC Radio and recording with British dance bands. Her distinctive soprano voice saw her working with some of the biggest names of the era, including bandleaders Jack Jackson and Henry Hall. She was one of the last surviving professional singers who had been active in the 1930s.

== Early life ==
Nelly Harrison was born in Bradford, Yorkshire, on 29 November 1916, during the First World War, and had an older brother, Tom. Aged four, she moved to Australia with her family, who settled in Burswood, a suburb of Perth. She began performing in cinemas, often dressed to look like Baby Peggy, a popular child star in Hollywood, and progressed to appearing in pantomimes in Perth, as well as Australia's major population centres of Melbourne and Sydney. Billed as "Little Nellie Harrison – Child Wonder", Harrison performed grand opera arias, such as the "Jewel Song" from Faust for Dame Nellie Melba, who she duetted with.

Harrison's voice brought her to the attention of the critics and audiences, with Melba remarking, "this voice must be preserved and not be used for years to come". A 1926 Sydney Opera House production of Aladdin was reviewed by The Sydney Morning Herald, in which it was noted that Harrison won applause from the audience. Harrison, "a diminutive child-prodigy, sang fluently and correctly, with shades and roulades, all in a tiny voice, the valse-air from Edward German's comic opera Tom Jones", the review added.

== Career ==
=== Early success ===
Following the Wall Street crash in 1929, and the subsequent Great Depression, Harrison and her family returned to Yorkshire, living in Shipley, outside Bradford. After leaving school, she worked as a costing clerk in a raincoat factory, but sang in clubs during the evenings. She also appeared with her brother Tom Harrison's band in Bradford. "Unlike their usual singer, I didn't need a megaphone", she said.

Harrison began getting bookings in the North of England, and, having been offered an audition by Eric Maschwitz, the then-Head of BBC Variety, she started to broadcast for the BBC North region in 1934. In the mid-1930s, Harrison joined Conri Tait's Orchestra, who appeared at the Grand Hotel in Harrogate.

By 1936, she was broadcasting under her stage name, Helen Clare, which she would be billed as this from this point on. In February 1937, she began broadcasting throughout Britain on the BBC National Programme with Jack Jackson's band, who were resident at the Dorchester Hotel in London. Jackson had spotted her the previous year, and Clare became a household name, taking bookings from the Radio Normandie, Lyon and Luxembourg stations. Whilst there, she was befriended by a young Danny Kaye, who was appearing in cabaret at the hotel. Clare began appearing on BBC Television when the medium was still in its infancy, becoming one of the first female singers to appear on the small screen in 1937.

That year, she sang George and Ira Gershwin's "They Can't Take That Away from Me" in Cabaret Cartoons, a television programme produced by Cecil Madden. On 22 June that year, she made her recording debut at a Rex session with Jay Wilbur and his Band, when Clare sang a duet with Jack Cooper, "Let's Call the Whole Thing Off", which had been introduced by Fred Astaire and Ginger Rogers in the film Shall We Dance. She made several more recordings with Wilbur's band, and also broadcast with him.

On 26 November 1937, she made her first recording with Jack Jackson and his Orchestra at a Decca session in which she sang "I'm a Little Prairie Flower" as part of a vocal ensemble with Jackson, Jackie Hunter and Jack Cooper. In December 1937, the Popular Music and Film Song Weekly wrote of Clare:

"…there are relatively few dance-band crooners who possess what the professors would describe as a 'real voice'. Pretty Helen Clare, however is one of the very few. Maybe you can detect the 'quality' when you hear her on the air with Jack Jackson from the Dorchester."

She also recorded three duets with Jackson – one of the most prominent bandleaders of the era – for his orchestra in January and May the following year. In addition, she appeared on television with him until 1939.

=== War and post-war fame ===
Following the outbreak of the Second World War, Clare was asked to join the BBC Variety department in Bristol, where they had evacuated to, and were forming a variety company. Clare remarked that "It was hard work to begin with, we were just one little company and had to dash from one studio to another but the company was lovely, people you'd worked with for years and we were all together and doing our bit". She worked with stars such as Flanagan and Allen, Tommy Trinder and Leslie 'Hutch' Hutchinson, appearing regularly on BBC Radio. She broadcast with the BBC's in-house orchestras and those led by such notable bandleaders as Carroll Gibbons, Henry Hall, Billy Ternent and Jack Hylton.

It was thought that Bristol would be safer than London, but this was proven wrong when the city suffered air raids in November 1940 and into 1941. The BBC Variety department consequently moved even further from London, this time to Bangor in North Wales. She became a freelance singer in 1941, and toured Britain's variety theatres. She also gave concerts for the troops at factories, naval stations, army bases and factories. In June 1941, she recorded a cover of "Beneath The Lights of Home (In A Little Old Sleepy Town)", from Deanna Durbin's film Nice Girl? as the vocalist on The Organ, The Dance Band and Me, a group led by Billy Thorburn. Two years later, with Thorburn's band, she recorded "Say A Pray'r for the Boys Over There", an Oscar-nominated song from Durbin's film Hers to Hold, and "Comin' In on a Wing and a Pray'r", both wartime-themed songs.

Offered the chance to work with bandleader Jack Payne, she broadcast with him for the Entertainments National Service Association (ENSA), singing songs such as "I'll Walk Beside You", a popular hit during the war. She also appeared in BBC programmes such as Music While You Work, Calling Forces Gibraltar and Workers' Playtime singing requests for the troops and their loved ones. Clare hosted It's All Yours from 1942 to 1944, in which she read out messages and performed songs sent in by children with relatives in the Allied forces. It was in this programme that the 9-year old Petula Clark made her broadcasting debut, later described by Clare as "this lovely little thing".

In early 1944, she recorded vocals at three sessions with Harry Leader and his Band for Regal Zonophone, who were based at the Astoria Ballroom in London. In addition to ENSA, Clare also performed for the Overseas Recorded Broadcasting Service, which made radio programmes for British forces stationed abroad. One of her favourite songs was Jerome Kern's "All the Things You Are", which she often sang on the BBC, notably with the Allied Expeditionary Force band in April 1945. Commenting on this, she said, "When I sang I was part of that song, and the songs then spoke of so many sentiments, and they tell a story".

Following the end of the war in Britain, Clare continued to work in variety and light music. The latter included operetta, in which she would be accompanied by orchestras led by Sidney Torch and George Melachrino. She continued to broadcast on popular radio shows such as Variety Bandbox and Palace of Varieties. In 1957, Friday Night Is Music Night, which had begun on the BBC Light Programme in 1953, featured Clare, accompanied by the BBC Concert Orchestra.

=== Later life ===
Clare continued performing professionally and appearing in broadcasts until the 1960s, when she had a mild heart attack. However, she gave singing lessons for the next thirty years, and, until the age of 90, was active in the Wallington Operatic Society.

In May 2015, aged 98, she was interviewed by Pam Rhodes for Songs of Praise on BBC One, in a programme marking the 70th anniversary of VE Day. In 2016, at the age of 99, Clare was reunited on live television with Petula Clark, whom she had worked with during the war on BBC Radio's It's All Yours. They appeared together on BBC One's The One Show. Clare was taken to the Grosvenor House Hotel for a celebration of her 100th birthday, in a visit featured on Holding Back the Years, a BBC One programme hosted by Ainsley Harriott. Joined by her daughter, granddaughter and great-grandchildren, she was serenaded by Alex Mendham and His Orchestra.

In 2018, the first album of Clare's recordings was released, All The Things You Are. Asked for the secrets to a long life, Clare said "There isn't a secret. You just have to be interested in things, in what's happening in the world. And keep your sense of enjoyment going."

== Personal life and death ==
In 1939, following the start of the Second World War, Clare lived at 88 Maida Vale (later a Grade II listed building) in the area of the same name, then part of the Metropolitan Borough of St Marylebone, west London. She married musician Frederick Riddle in Kensington in 1946, who was later awarded an OBE, and described as "one of the most eminent viola players of his time". The couple had met at BBC Bristol whilst he was in the BBC Salon Orchestra, and were together for over forty years. They had a daughter, Elizabeth, who was said to have inherited her mother's vocal talents. Riddle died in 1995; Clare received her 100th birthday card from Queen Elizabeth II addressed to her married name, Mrs Helen Riddle.

Clare lived in Wallington, in Sutton, south London from 1952 to 1987, when she moved to the Isle of Wight, where her husband died. She returned to live in Carshalton, Sutton, in 1995, where she remained until 2011. Clare later moved into sheltered accommodation in Wallington, and died on 15 September 2018, aged 101. She was survived by her daughter, granddaughter and three great-grandchildren.

== See also ==
- Mary Lee (1921–2022), the last surviving British dance band singer of the 1930s
