= Sandie Jones =

Irish singer (1951–2019)

- Jones performing at the Eurovision Song Contest 1972

Background information
- Born: Margaret Jones; 9 November 1951; Crumlin, Dublin, Ireland
- Died: 19 September 2019 (aged 67) Gunnison, Colorado, U.S.
- Genres: Pop; folk; middle-of-the-road
- Years active: 1967–1983 (Ireland)
- Labels: Release; Play; Spider; EMI; Rex
- Formerly of: The Dixies

Margaret "Sandie" Jones (9 November 1951 – 19 September 2019) was an Irish singer, best known for representing Ireland in the Eurovision Song Contest 1972 with the song "Ceol an Ghrá". This marked the only occasion in the history of the contest on which a song was performed in the Irish language.

== Early life ==
Sandie Jones was born in Lisle Road, Crumlin, Dublin, one of the eleven children of John and Mary Jones. She began singing at an early age, taking part in local Feis competitions and appearing on a radio broadcast at the age of 9.

== Career ==
Since the age of 15, Jones started singing with several local bands, including The Statesmen and the Monaco Showband, before joining the middle-of-the-road group Royal Earls in 1968, with which she gained popularity. At the age of 18, she briefly performed for a residency at Hammersmith Palais, London.

After winning the 1969 Castlebar Song Contest with the song "Reflections of You", Bil Keating signed her for the RTÉ series Girls, Girls, Girls in 1970, and she went on to become a regular guest on the show Man and His Music. She also had a short-lived career as a fashion model during this period.

Following her first international performance at the 1971 Slovene Song Festival, she joined The Dixies in January 1972, and shortly after she won the Irish national selection for the Eurovision Song Contest 1972, held at the Cork Opera House, with the song "Ceol an Ghrá" (transl. "The Music of Love"); the entry, which was written by Joe Burkett and Liam Mac Uistín and ultimately placed 15th with 72 points at the Usher Hall in Edinburgh, is the only one in the history of the contest to have ever been performed in the Irish language. "Ceol an Ghrá" and its follow-up single "What Do I Do" (a cover of the Dutch Eurovision entry) both reached number one on the national charts, launching Jones' career. After leaving The Dixies in 1973, Jones founded her own band, Sandie Jones and the Boyfriends, later renamed the Sandie Jones Gang. Throughout her Irish career, she performed at the Gaiety Theatre, the Olympia Theatre and the Abbey Theatre in Dublin. The Irish music industry elected her the most popular female entertainer in Ireland for five consecutive years.

Jones' marriage to her manager Tony McIver marked a shift in her musical style, with the couple leaving Europe for Abu Dhabi in 1983, where she continued to perform before settling in the United States.

In 2016, she was invited by TG4 to form part of the jury who would determine the Irish entry in the Junior Eurovision Song Contest 2016.

== Final years and death ==
In January 2016, Jones moved to Gunnison, Colorado, to work as a caregiver alongside one of her sisters. She was locally known as Maggie O'Brien. After a long battle with cancer, Jones died in hospice care in Gunnison on 19 September 2019, at the age of 67. She was cremated and her ashes were buried at Glasnevin Cemetery in Dublin, next to her parents and one of her sisters.

== Discography ==
=== Albums ===
| Title | Release date | Label | Record number | Format |
|---|---|---|---|---|
| The Good Old Days | 1976 | EMI Records | IEMC 6006 | Vinyl |
| Sandie Jones | 1978 | Rex Records | SPR.1021 | Vinyl |

=== Singles ===
With the Royal Earls
| Title | Release date | Label | Record number |
|---|---|---|---|
| "Reflections of You" | July 1969 | Release Records | RL.514 |
| "Keep in Touch" / "Voice in the Crowd" | June 1970 | Release Records | RL.535 |
| "I Don't Want to Play House" | 1971 | Release Records | RL.574 |

With The Dixies
| Title | Release date | Label | Record number | Peak chart position (Ireland) |
|---|---|---|---|---|
| "Ceol an Ghrá" / "Cry Cry Again" | February 1972 | Play Records | PLAY 20 | 1 |
| "What Do I Do" / "It Was Only a Heart" (with Joe O'Toole) | March 1972 | Play Records | PLAY 21 | 1 |
| "Looking for Love" (Sandie Jones) / "Sandie" (Joe O'Toole) | August 1972 | Play Records | PLAY 31 | —N/a |
| "The Happiest Girl" / "I Don't Want to Play House" | November 1972 | Play Records | PLAY 47 | —N/a |

As Sandie Jones and the Boyfriends
| Title | Release date | Label | Record number |
|---|---|---|---|
| "End of the World" / "It's a Crying Shame" | November 1973 | Release Records | RL.704 |
| "Bim Ban Boom" / "Single Girl" | July 1974 | EMI Records | EMI.5001 |

As the Sandie Jones Band
| Title | Release date | Label | Record number | Peak chart position (Ireland) |
|---|---|---|---|---|
| "Boogie Woogie Dancing Shoes" / "Instrumental" | March 1979 | Spider Records | WEB.006 | 15 |
| "Shoes On Boots Off" / "Instrumental" | December 1979 | Spider Records | WEB.017 | 17 |

As the Sandie Jones Gang
| Title | Release date | Label | Record number |
|---|---|---|---|
| "I Don't Want to Marry Superman" / "Take the Money and Run" | 1981 | Spider Records | WEB.041 |

Awards and achievements
| Preceded by Angela Farrell with "One Day Love" | Ireland in the Eurovision Song Contest; 1972 | Succeeded by Maxi with "Do I Dream" |
