= Al Tabor =

Alfred Taboriwsky (1898–1983), known as Al Tabor, was an English bandleader, best known as the supposed originator of the song the "Hokey Cokey", even though versions of the song had been published long before Tabor's one.

Tabor was born in Whitechapel in the East End of London to Jewish parents who had fled the pogroms of Vilnius, then in Russia. A musical prodigy as a child, he studied the violin under Mischa Elman, and at the age of 11 won a scholarship to the Guildhall School of Music. He spent the years of World War I staying with relatives of his mother in Boston, Massachusetts, United States, where he came under the influence of the newly emerging jazz music, forming first a trio and then his own band that played in hotels in and around Boston.

On his return from the United States he played in many bands in England from the 1920s until the 1950s, and from 1928 was the "Music Director of the Hammersmith and Birmingham Palais". It was during The Blitz in 1940, when London was bombarded by Nazi Germany in the Second World War, that he allegedly first composed, and his band first played, the song "Hokey Cokey". Despite this claim, versions of the song can be found from 1826, 1891, and 1892, all before Tabor was born.
