= Andy Hamilton (jazz saxophonist) =

British jazz saxophonist (1918–2012)

Andy Hamilton MBE
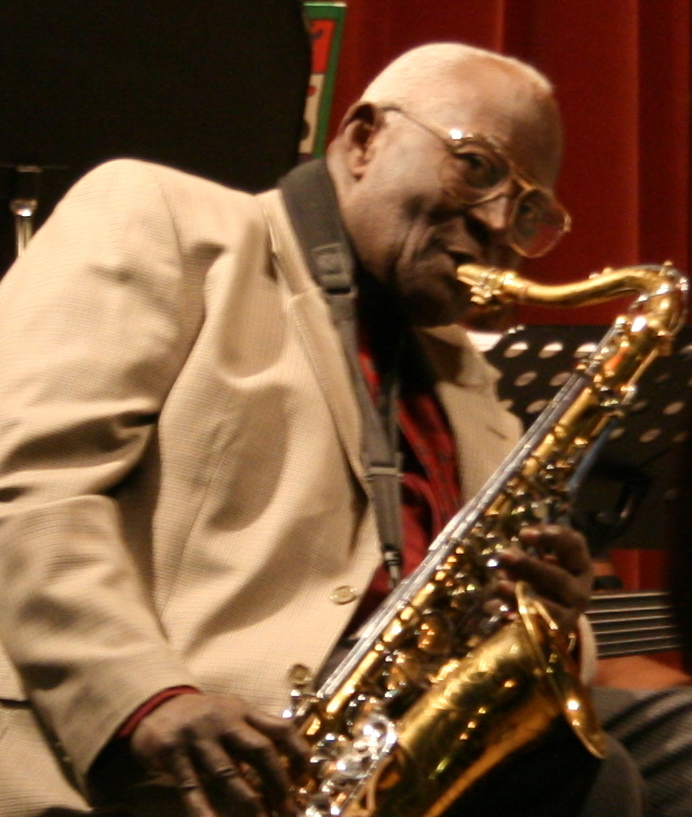

Background information
- Birth name: Andy Raphael Thomas Hamilton
- Born: 26 March 1918; Port Maria, Jamaica
- Died: 3 June 2012 (aged 94); United Kingdom
- Genres: Jazz
- Instrument: Saxophone
- Years active: 1940s–2000s
- Labels: World Circuit

Andy Raphael Thomas Hamilton, MBE (26 March 1918 – 3 June 2012) was a Jamaican-born British jazz saxophonist and composer who migrated to the UK in 1949. He recorded his debut album in his early 70s.

== Biography ==
=== Early years ===
Hamilton was born in Port Maria, Jamaica, and learnt to play saxophone on a bamboo instrument. He formed his first band in 1928 with friends who played oil drums and Hamilton a bamboo sax, influenced by American musicians such as Duke Ellington and Count Basie and by the Kingston-based bands of Redver Cook and Roy Coburn.

He spent some time in the U.S., working as a cook and farm labourer, but also having short jazz residencies in Buffalo and Syracuse, New York. After returning to Jamaica, he worked as musical arranger for Errol Flynn at his hotel The Titchfield, and on his yacht the Zaka.

=== Migration to the UK ===
Hamilton emigrated to the UK in 1949, arriving as a stowaway and eventually living and working in Birmingham. His day job was in a factory, while at night he played jazz — with his own group, the Blue Notes formed with fellow Jamaican pianist Sam Brown in 1953. Playing mainly local gigs and functions Hamilton also promoted regular gigs across the city booking an early Steel Pulse and numerous Jamaican bands at The Tower Ballroom, St John's Restaurant, Accafess, Porsche Club, Junction, Hyatt before establishing a regular weekly venue in Bearwood, inviting visiting musicians such as Joe Newman, Al Casey, Teddy Edwards, Art Farmer, Harry Sweets Edison, and David Murray. Hamilton fronted weekly gigs on Thursday nights at Bearwood Corks. His sons Graeme and Mark play trumpet and saxophone respectively.

=== Late career ===
In 1988 EndBoards Production produced a documentary called 'Silver Shine' about Andy Hamilton's migration to the UK and the hurdles experienced in growing his music career, the changing musical taste of Windrush generation and their descendents. The documentary features Andy's Band the Blue Notes with lead vocalist Ann Scott; his first youth band The Blue Pearls, Tony Sykes, Millicent Stephenson nee Lindsay, his children Graeme and Mark.

Having recovered from a diabetic coma in 1986, he celebrated his 70th birthday in 1988 playing at his regular venue, The Bear, and the gig was reviewed in The Independent by Val Wilmer. Following her recommendation, he was invited to perform at the Soho Jazz Festival, and in 1991 at the age of 73, Hamilton made his first ever recording with Nick Gold, Silvershine on World Circuit Records. It became the biggest selling UK Jazz Album of the Year, The Times Jazz Album of the Year, and one of the 50 Sony Recordings of the Year. It was followed two years later by Jamaica at Night. These recordings led to concerts in St Lucia, Jamaica, Cape Town, Madri, WOMAD, Paris, the Jazz Cafe, Ronnie Scott's, and national tours. He continued to play regularly until his death, appearing at the Bearwood Corks Club in Birmingham, and monthly at Birmingham Symphony Hall. His 90th birthday concert was at a long sold-out Birmingham Town Hall featured Courtney Pine, Sonny Bradshaw, Myrna Hague, Lekan Babalola, Nana Tsiboe, son Mark and The Notebenders, a community music project he set up.

Hamilton continued to play, teach and promote music even as he approached his 94th birthday. He died peacefully on 3 June 2012.

== Awards and honors ==
In 1996 Hamilton was awarded an Honorary Master of Arts degree by Birmingham University, in 1999 he received a Millennium Fellowship for his work in Community Education, which has involved the establishment of The Ladywood Community School of Music.

He was appointed Member of the Order of the British Empire (MBE) in the 2008 New Year Honours.

On 30 January 2008, a few weeks before his 90th birthday, he was made an Honorary Fellow of the Birmingham Conservatoire during a ceremony at Symphony Hall.

The centenary of Hamilton's birth, and his continuing legacy, was celebrated at Birmingham Town Hall, with a concert featuring The Notebenders Big Band and guests.

The Birmingham Jazz venue Bearwood Corks Club was rebranded in 2012 as the Silvershine Jazz Club after Andy's most notable album Silvershine.

== Discography ==
=== As leader ===
- Silvershine (World Circuit, 1991)
- Jamaica by Night (World Circuit, 1994)
- Late and Live (Burton, 1997)
