= Southern Rag-a-Jazz Orchestra =

The Southern Rag-a-Jazz Orchestra was an early jazz band that formed in Lincoln, Nebraska by six students at the University of Nebraska, and played for a while at the Fontonelle Hotel in Omaha.

In the summer of 1921 the band were one of the first to tour to Europe, playing at the Rector's Club and the Hammersmith Palais in London and the Birmingham Palais, where they performed opposite Benny Peyton's Jazz Kings and with the young Jack Payne. While in England they also recorded three sessions for Edison Bell. The band spent most of late 1921 and early 1922 in France, but most members had returned to the United States by mid 1922.

Billboard reported on 8 July 1922: "The Original Rag-A-Jazz Band, comprised of six university graduates, is back at its original home in Lincoln, Nebraska, after being abroad for more than six months, during which many notable engagements were played at leading hotels and for the nobility of London and Paris. The Personnel: Gayle Grubb, piano; Edward G Cressell, violin; Donville A Fairchild, banjo; A Harold Schmidt, drums; Harold Peterson, sax; Bert E. Reed, trombone. "The Dancing World", and English magazine, acclaims the organisation as the greatest heard in London. The college syncopators will probably go back to the other side in the fall."

== Members ==
- Gayle V Grubb - Piano
- Harold Peterson - Soprano Sax.
- Donville Fairchild - Banjo
- Bert Reed - Trombone
- Edward Cresswell - Violin.
- A. Harold Schmidt - Drums
