= Mary O'Rourke (singer) =

British singer

- Born: July 26, 1913
- Died: December 24, 1964 (aged 51)
- Other names: Master Joe Petersen, Mary Lethbridge

Mary O'Rourke (26 July 1913 - 24 December 1964) was a boy soprano singer, operating under the stage name Master Joe Petersen. She was billed as 'The Phenomenal Boy Singer' and made over 59 releases for Rex Records.

== Early life ==
As the twelfth child of Hannah Irvine and James O'Rourke in Gallowgate, O'Rourke and her elder brother Joe were frequent winners of talent shows, with O'Rourke creating a name for herself in Scottish music halls.

== Master Joe Petersen ==
In 1930, aged 17, O'Rourke moved to Islington, north London, to live with her aunt and uncle, Minnie Irvine and Edward 'Ted' Stebbings. Stebbings was an entertainer and was training his son to become a choirboy. When his son's voice broke, Stebbings convinced an initially reluctant O'Rourke to masquerade as a boy soprano. Under the stage name Master Joe Petersen, she took radio and recording contracts, being presented as 'The Phenomenal Boy Singer' From 1934 to 1942, she produced 59 records for Rex. She also recorded under the names Wilfred Eaton and Michael Dawnay. She became an international star, although she was barred from performing on the BBC due to notions of impropriety.

== Personal life and death ==
O'Rourke married violinist George Lethbridge in 1933, and their daughter Margaret was born in 1934, though it was not a happy marriage. O'Rourke developed a drinking problem, which was worsened by the deaths of her father and brother Joe in 1944 and 1945 respectively. Her marriage collapsed in 1952 and she returned to Glasgow. She still performed as Master Joe throughout the 1940s and 50s, together with artists such as Chic Murray. She died of bronchitis on Christmas Eve 1964, age 51.
