= William Keating =

William or Bill Keating may refer to:

- William H. Keating (1799–1840), American geologist
- William J. Keating (1927–2020), former U.S. Representative from Ohio
- Bill Keating (born 1952), U.S. Representative from Massachusetts
- Bill Keating (American football) (1944–2015), American football player and attorney
- Bil Keating (born 1940), Irish television and stage producer
- William Keating (sprinter), winner of the 75 yards at the 1909 USA Indoor Track and Field Championships
