= Jay Wilbur =

British bandleader (1898–1968)

- Born: Wilbur Blinco; 1898; Leamington Spa, Warwickshire, England
- Died: 1968 (aged 69–70) Cape Town, South Africa
- Genres: Jazz; Swing music Big band British dance band
- Occupation: Dance bandleader
- Labels: Rex, Dominion Records, Crown, Imperial, Eclipse

James Edward Wilbur (1898–1968) was a British bandleader and prolifically recorded musician identified with and influential in the era of British dance band music.

Wilbur was born Wilbur Blinco in 1898 in Leamington Spa, Warwickshire. He became recording director for Dominion Records in 1928, but left Dominion shortly before its demise, and became recording manager for the Crystalate Manufacturing Company. With his own name and under many pseudonyms, his recordings appeared on a variety of labels, including Imperial, Eclipse, Rex and Crown.

He broadcast for the BBC in the 1930s, often featuring guest artists such as Fats Waller. In 1941, he appeared as himself in the film Hi Gang!. His dance band recordings often featured a young Vera Lynn on vocals, and he later accompanied Lynn on her solo releases.

Jay Wilbur and His Band performed extensively for Allied military service members during World War II. He is known for recording established tunes while rendering them in foxtrot style.

Wilbur died in Cape Town, South Africa, in 1968.
