= Music of Birmingham =

The Music of Birmingham may refer to:

- Classical music of Birmingham
- Jazz of Birmingham
- Popular music of Birmingham
