= A Day with Dana =

- Presented by: Dana Rosemary Scallon
- Country of origin: United Kingdom
- Original language: English
- No. of seasons: 1
- No. of episodes: 6

Production
- Production company: BBC

Original release
- Network: BBC Two
- Release: 1 December 1974 – 12 January 1975

A Day with Dana is a British chat show hosted by Dana Rosemary Scallon which was first aired on BBC Two in 1974.

== Episodes ==
No.	Title	Original release date
1	"Don Maclean"	1 December 1974
2	"Roy Hudd"	8 December 1974
3	"Terry Scott"	15 December 1974
4	"Rod Hull and Emu"	29 December 1974
5	"Derek Griffiths"	5 January 1975
6	"Freddie Davies"	12 January 1975
