= Broadcast Twelve Records =

- 1927 Broadcast Twelve Records label
- Parent company: Vocalion 1927 - Mid-1932 Crystalate Mid-1932 - 1934
- Founded: 1927; 99 years ago
- Defunct: 1934; 92 years ago
- Status: Defunct
- Distributor: Vocalion
- Genre: Jazz
- Country of origin: United Kingdom
- Location: Hayes, Middlesex

Broadcast Twelve Records was a United Kingdom-based record label introduced in 1928 to partner the regular "Broadcast" brand records introduced in 1927. These brands replaced the Aco Records label. The manufacturer of the discs were the Vocalion Gramophone Company. "Broadcast" discs were 8-inch (later increased to 9-inch) and "Broadcast Twelve" discs were 10-inch 78rpm gramophone records, but with small labels and a fine groove pitch so they would play as long as regular 10- and 12-inch discs respectively. They ceased production in 1934.

The label was a subsidiary of the British branch of Vocalion Records. A full listing of Broadcast records was published by the City of London Phonograph and Gramophone Society CLPGS in 2017.

== See also ==
- Lists of record labels
