= TT Electronics =

UK manufacturing company

TT Electronics plc
- Type: Public limited company
- Traded as: LSE: TTG
- ISIN: GB0008711763
- Founded: 1988; 38 years ago
- Founders: William Tyzack; Benjamin Turner
- Headquarters: London, City of London
- Key people: Warren Tucker (Chairman); Peter France (Chief executive officer)
- Revenue: ▼£481.4 million (2025)
- Operating income: ▼£(28.2) million (2025)
- Net income: ▲£(50.6) million (2025)
- Number of employees: 4,972 (2022)
- Website: www.ttelectronics.com

TT Electronics Plc is a global manufacturer of electronic components and provider of manufacturing services, headquartered in London, England. It is listed on the London Stock Exchange.

== History ==
The company has its origins in a firm of toolmakers, W. Tyzack Sons & Turner, which was established in Sheffield, in around 1867. It was first listed on the London Stock Exchange in 1948.

After the Sheffield works had been sold to a rival in 1987, the listed company, which was by then known as Tyzack Turner Group plc, was acquired by new management and was renamed TT Group plc in 1988.

In 1990, TT Group acquired Crystalate Manufacturing Company, a British resistors and sensors manufacturing company.

In the 1990s, its electronics activities were expanded through multiple acquisitions, including of the Magnetic Materials Group, AB Electronic Products Group and BI Technologies. Additional purchases included Dale Electric International in 1994, and the AEI Group, which was the Wire and Cables Division of the General Electric Company, in 1997.

In 2000, after the de-merging of several non-core businesses to focus on advanced electronics and electronic technologies, TT Group changed its name to TT Electronics.

In April 2008, TT Electronics bought New Chapel Electronics, a manufacturer of interconnection systems for the aerospace industry.

In October 2012, the firm launched its new manufacturing plant in Romania.

In December 2015, TT Electronics purchased the safety critical components specialist Aero Stanrew, increasing its footprint in the aerospace and defence markets.

In June 2018, it bought the electromagnetic solution provider Precision of Minneapolis to expand its footprint in the US power electronics market. That same year, TT Electronics acquired by power electronics firm Stadium Group plc.

In September 2020, the magnetic assemblies specialist Torotel, Inc. was purchased by the company.

In early 2021, as part of wider efforts to increase its manufacturing capabilities, TT Electronics expanded its Bedlington plant. That same year, it also opened a new facility in Texas. Over the following two years, the firm continued to increase its manufacturing base in countries such as Mexico, Malaysia, and the UK.

In January 2022, the Power and Control business of Ferranti Technologies, a manufacturer of mission-critical power and control sub-assemblies, was purchased by TT Electronics. During 2023, the firm's year-on-year operating profits rose by 34 per cent.

In September 2024, TT Electronics declared the two of its US locations were experiencing issues relating to operational efficiency. In February 2025, the company delayed its results announcement after encountering "operational execution challenges" in its North American business. The results were eventually released in April 2025; that same month, the company issued a warning that US tariffs could negatively impact its operations.

During 2025, TT Electronics' largest shareholder, DBAY Advisors, made a bid to purchase the firm; a separate offer from Volex was also received, although neither proposal received the board's backing. In October 2025, the Swiss electronics business Cicor Technologies issued their own offer, valued at £287 million, to acquire the company. In January 2026, it was announced that, despite Cicor Technologies bid having been recommended by TT Electronics' board of directors, the company's shareholders did not give the required shareholder approval and, as a result, the proposed acquisition did not proceed. Three months later, several board members parted ways with the business.

== Operations ==
The company engineers and manufactures sensors, power modules, resistors, magnetics, semiconductors, connectors and optoelectronics for the industrial, aerospace and defence, medical and transportation markets. Product brands are AB Connectors, Aero Stanrew, BI Technologies, Cletronics, IRC, Optek Technology, Roxspur Measurement and Control, Semelab and Welwyn Components.
