= Jamaica Broadcasting Corporation =

Jamaican public broadcasting company

- Type: Broadcast radio and television
- Country: Jamaica
- Availability: Jamaica
- Owner: Government of Jamaica
- Launch date: 15 June 1959
- Dissolved: 1997
- Official website: https://pbcjamaica.org/

The Jamaica Broadcasting Corporation (JBC) was a public broadcasting company in Jamaica, founded in 1959 by premier Norman Manley, with the aim of emulating the success of other national broadcasting companies such as the BBC and CBC.

== History ==
Jamaica had commercial radio stations since the 1930s, but these were controlled by foreign companies (RJR was owned by the British Rediffusion Group) and programming consisted of imported shows and music. The JBC was established by legislation in December 1958 as a 'state owned and statutory corporation' and launched on 15 June 1959 and provided a greater focus on Jamaican culture, as Jamaicans sought to celebrate their own culture in the 'dominion' era shortly before the country's independence in 1962. In the early days of the JBC, the corporation had a resident big band featuring musicians such as Ernest Ranglin and Sonny Bradshaw and a drama department producing original programmes. The JBC radio channel that began broadcasting in 1959 played a major part in the development of the Jamaican music industry, giving previously-unavailable airtime to Jamaican musicians.

JBC Television began broadcasting on Sunday, 4 August 1963 at 6 pm ( See: The Daily Gleaner Archives, August 4, 1963, page 2), to coincide with the first anniversary of Jamaica's independence. It was the second television service launched in the Commonwealth Caribbean, following Trinidad and Tobago Television (TTT) from the previous year. Like the radio station, the aim was to concentrate on Jamaican programming, but financial concerns saw the schedules increasingly filled with programmes imported from the US and the UK.

The links to the government, however, caused problems, with accusations of partisan journalism. A change in government in 1962 led to accusations of JBC journalists favouring the previous PNP government, a situation that led to one of the longest strikes in Jamaican history in 1964. By the end of the strike most of the news journalists had been replaced.

When Michael Manley (son of Norman Manley) was elected Prime Minister in 1972, he aimed to use the JBC as a vehicle for nation building. Government funding for original Jamaican programming was increased, with news and documentary programmes such as Public Eye, and Jamaica's first soap opera, Lime Tree Lane. By the 1980s, JBC had television, two national radio stations, and several regional radio stations. Under Prime Minister Edward Seaga and the US-led Structural Adjustment model which encouraged the privatisation of public services, the divestment of the JBC began, first with the selling off of the regional radio stations; These became Radio Waves (HOT 102), KLAS-FM and IRIE-FM. The entire newsroom staff were also dismissed for being too critical of conservative positions, and replaced with journalists considered sympathetic to Seaga's government. Foreign programming again began to proliferate, largely sourced from the US.

The corporation remained under government control until the 1990s when a re-elected Manley removed direct political control and initiated shared responsibility for the appointment of a Director General with the leader of the opposition.

In 1997 Prime Minister P.J. Patterson, under the Public Broadcasting Corporation of Jamaica Act divested the JBC, with an announcement of the creation of a new organization, the Public Broadcasting Corporation of Jamaica (PBCJ) to provide public broadcasting. The television and the Radio 2 assets were sold to the Radio Jamaica Limited (RJR) for J$70M, and the former JBC television channel was replaced by the commercial station Television Jamaica. The Radio 1 studios and licence were retained by the government but fell into disrepair. The PBCJ broadcast its first transmission in March 2006 which was followed by a series of test transmissions with full broadcasting services commencing on 16 October 2006.
