= Aco Records =

1920s British record label

Aco Records or ACO Records was a British record label active from 1922 through 1927.

Aco was a budget label, producing 10 inch and 12 inch double sided gramophone records. Aco was a subsidiary of the Aeolian Company Ltd. of London, which in turn was an affiliate of the United States based Vocalion Records. The material was mostly popular dance tunes and songs of the day, together with some light Classics and operatic selections. Aco seems to have made no recordings themselves, instead taking masters from both British and US Aeolian, as well as leasing masters from U.S.-based Gennett Records. Sometimes these re-releases on Aco had the recording artists listed on the label under various pseudonyms. The discs were manufactured, alongside Aeolian Vocalion discs, at the factory of the Universal Music Company at Hayes.

The brand was discontinued in 1927 and replaced by the Broadcast and Broadcast Twelve Records brands.

Artists on the label included the Broadway Band, Merrie's Dance Quintette, The Lyricals and the St. Hilda Prize Band.

== See also ==
- Lists of record labels
