= Angela Farrell =

Irish singer

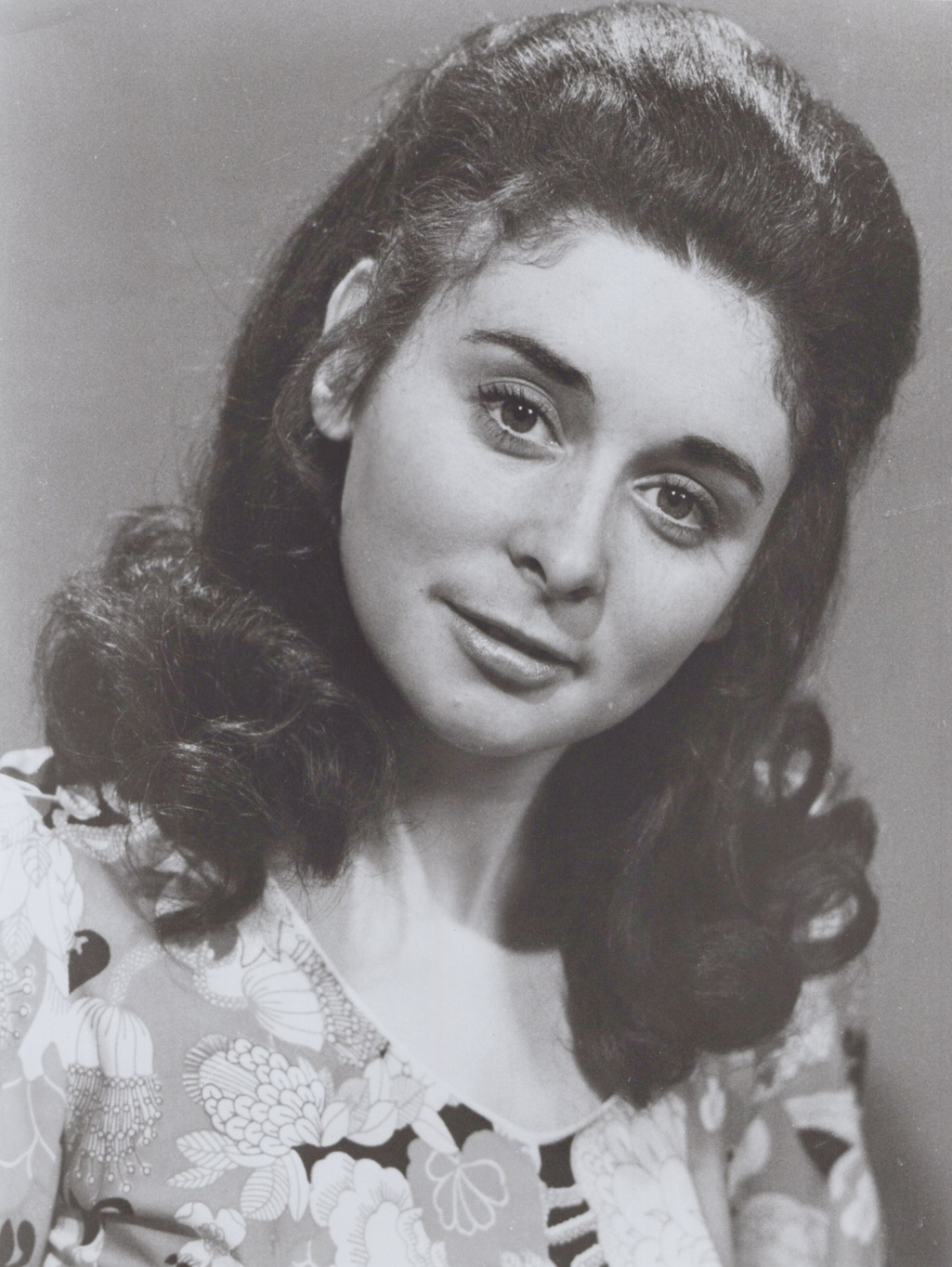
Farrell in 1971

Angela Farrell (born 1952 in Portadown) is an Irish singer who represented Ireland at the Eurovision Song Contest 1971 with the song "One Day Love". With 79 points, she came in 11th position.

== Singles ==
- One day love (1971) — #4 Irish Singles Chart
- How Near Is Love (1971) —
- I Am (1971) — #9 Irish Singles Chart
- Somewhere In The Shadow of My Dreams (1971) —
- Top of the World (1972)
- Dusty (1972)

Awards and achievements
| Preceded by Dana with "All Kinds of Everything" | Ireland in the Eurovision Song Contest; 1971 | Succeeded by Sandie Jones with "Ceol an Ghrá" |
