= Dana Rosemary Scallon =

Irish singer and politician (born 1950)

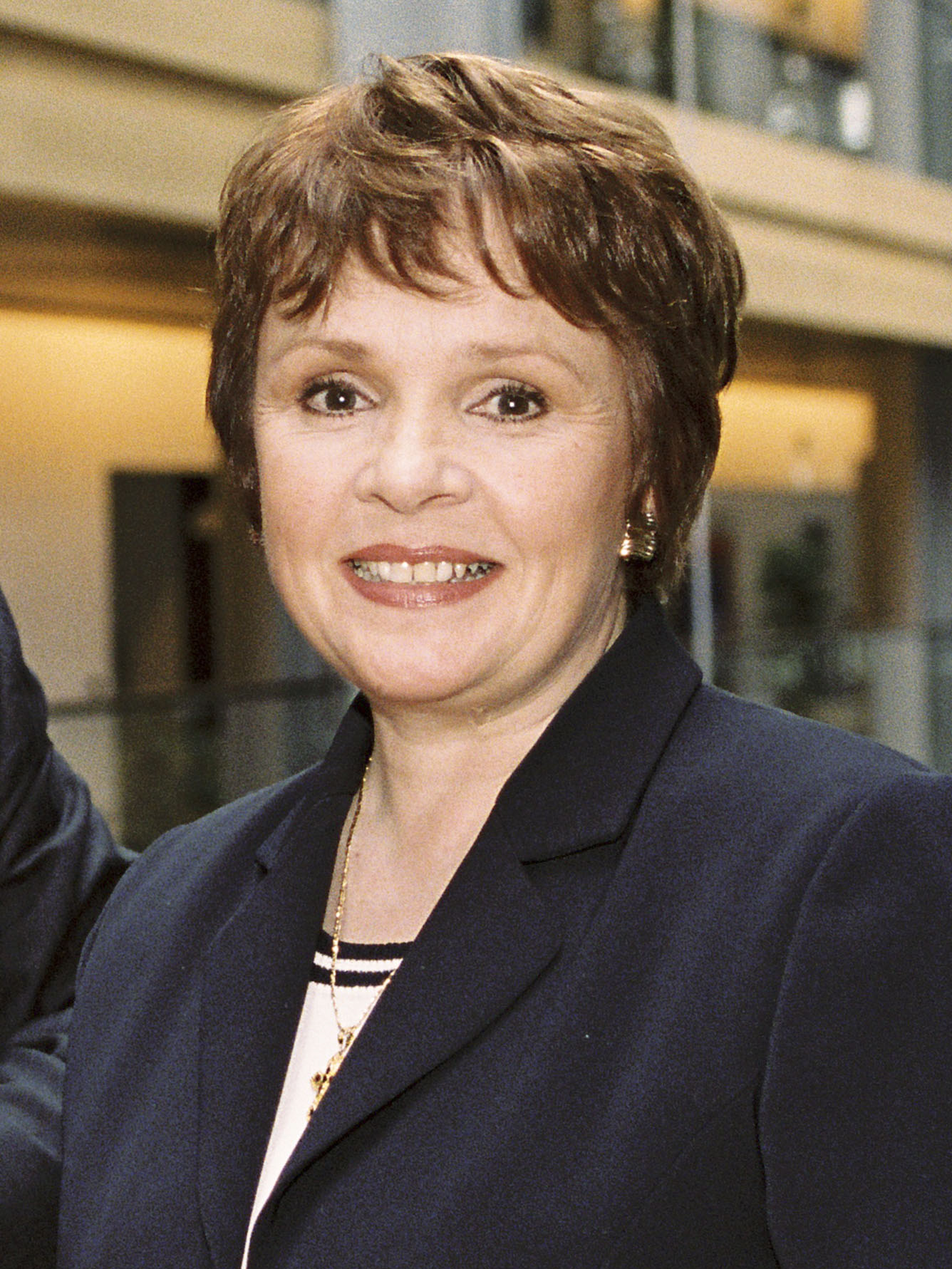
- Scallon in 2004

Member of the European Parliament
- In office 11 June 1999 – 11 June 2004
- Constituency: Connacht–Ulster

Personal details
- Born: Rosemary Brown; 30 August 1950 (age 76) Islington, London, England
- Citizenship: Ireland; United Kingdom; United States
- Party: Independent
- Spouse: Damien Scallon (m. 1978)
- Children: 4
- Musical career
- Also known as: Dana
- Origin: Derry, Northern Ireland
- Genres: Celtic; folk; pop; Christian
- Years active: 1967–present
- Labels: Rex; Decca; GTO; Creole; Warwick; Fanfare; Epic; Heart Beat; Lite; Ritz; Word; DS Music; Cherry Red; FOD Records
- Website: allkindsdana.com

Dana Rosemary Scallon (born Rosemary Brown; 30 August 1950), known professionally as Dana (/ˈdɑːnə/), is an Irish singer, songwriter and politician. While still a schoolgirl she won the Eurovision Song Contest 1970 with "All Kinds of Everything". It became a worldwide million-seller and launched her music career.

She entered politics in 1997, as Dana Rosemary Scallon, running unsuccessfully in the Irish presidential election, but later being elected as an MEP for Connacht–Ulster in 1999. Scallon was again an independent candidate in the Irish 2011 presidential election, but was eliminated on the first count. Scallon served as a politician as a Member of the European Parliament from 1999 to 2004.

== Background ==
Scallon was born Rosemary Brown in Islington, London, England, one of seven children. Her father Robert Brown worked as a porter at nearby King's Cross station, in addition to being a barber and trumpeter. Originally from Derry, Northern Ireland, Robert moved his family to London to seek employment opportunities after World War II. Her mother was Sheila née Sheerin, also from Derry, and a talented musician. When Rosemary was five, she moved with her family back to Derry, where she grew up in the Creggan housing estate and Bogside.

At age six, Scallon won her first talent contest. Other children in her community nicknamed her "Dana" (Irish for bold or mischievous) because Scallon would practice judo moves. Scallon later attended Thornhill College, a girls' Catholic school in Derry. When she was 14, Scallon worked a summer job at the Bazooka chewing gum factory in Essex.

Shortly before turning 16 and with the help of teacher and music promoter Tony Johnston, Scallon signed with the Decca Records subsidiary label Rex Records. Performing as Dana, Scallon debuted with the single "Sixteen" written by Tony Johnston, while the B-side, "Little Girl Blue", was her own composition. Now studying A-level music and English, she became popular in Dublin's cabaret and folk clubs at weekends, and was crowned Queen of Cabaret at Clontarf Castle in 1968. Rex Records' secretary Phil Mitton suggested she audition for the Irish National Song Contest, due to take place in February 1969 – a victory would see her represent Ireland in the Eurovision Song Contest. With mixed feelings due to nerves she made it through to the final in Dublin where she sang "Look Around" by Michael Reade, later released as her fourth single. Shown live on Irish television, Scallon came second to Muriel Day and "Wages of Love", also written by Reade.

== 1970s – Eurovision victory and pop career ==
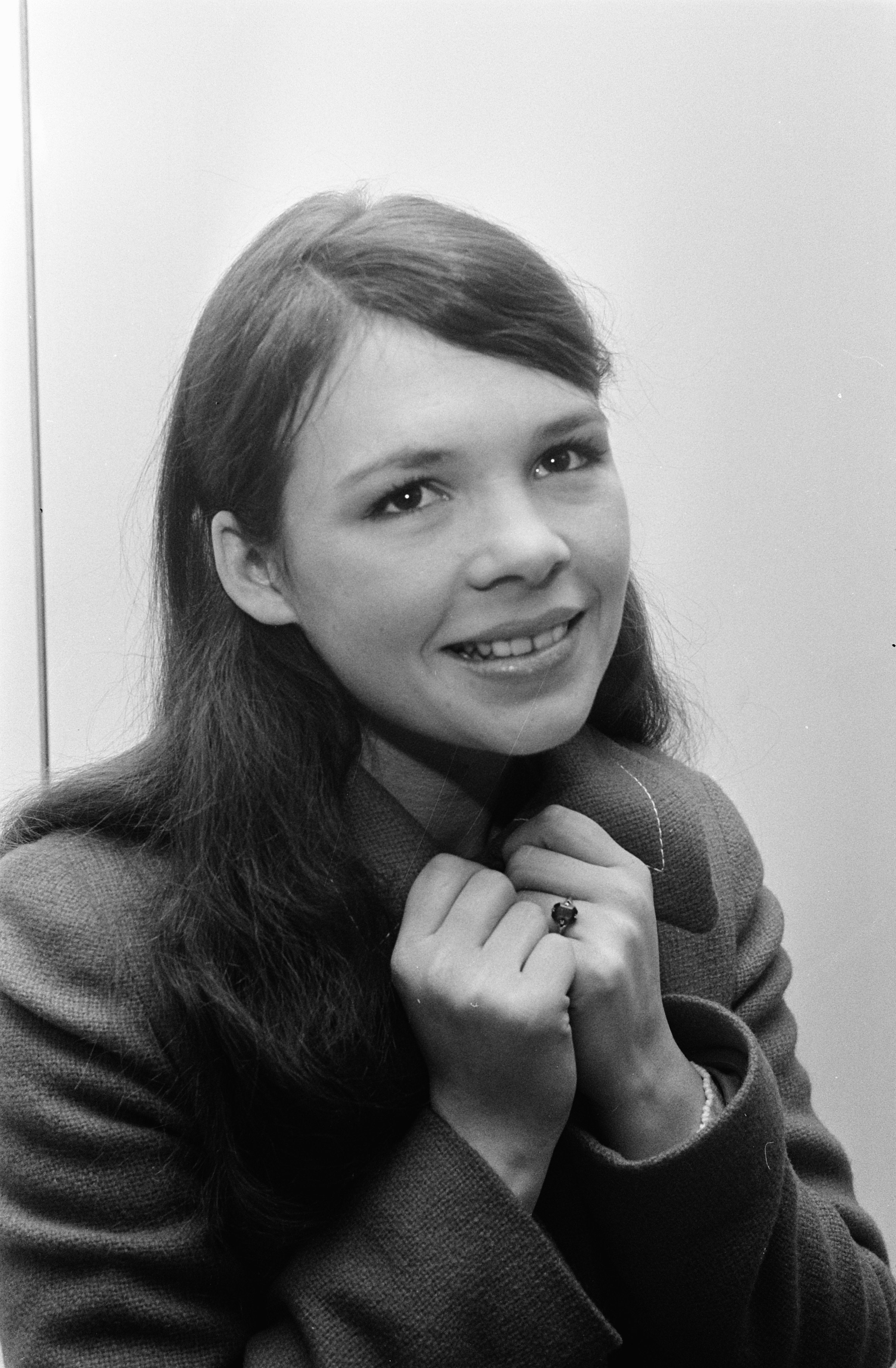
Dana on arrival at Amsterdam Airport Schiphol on 16 March 1970

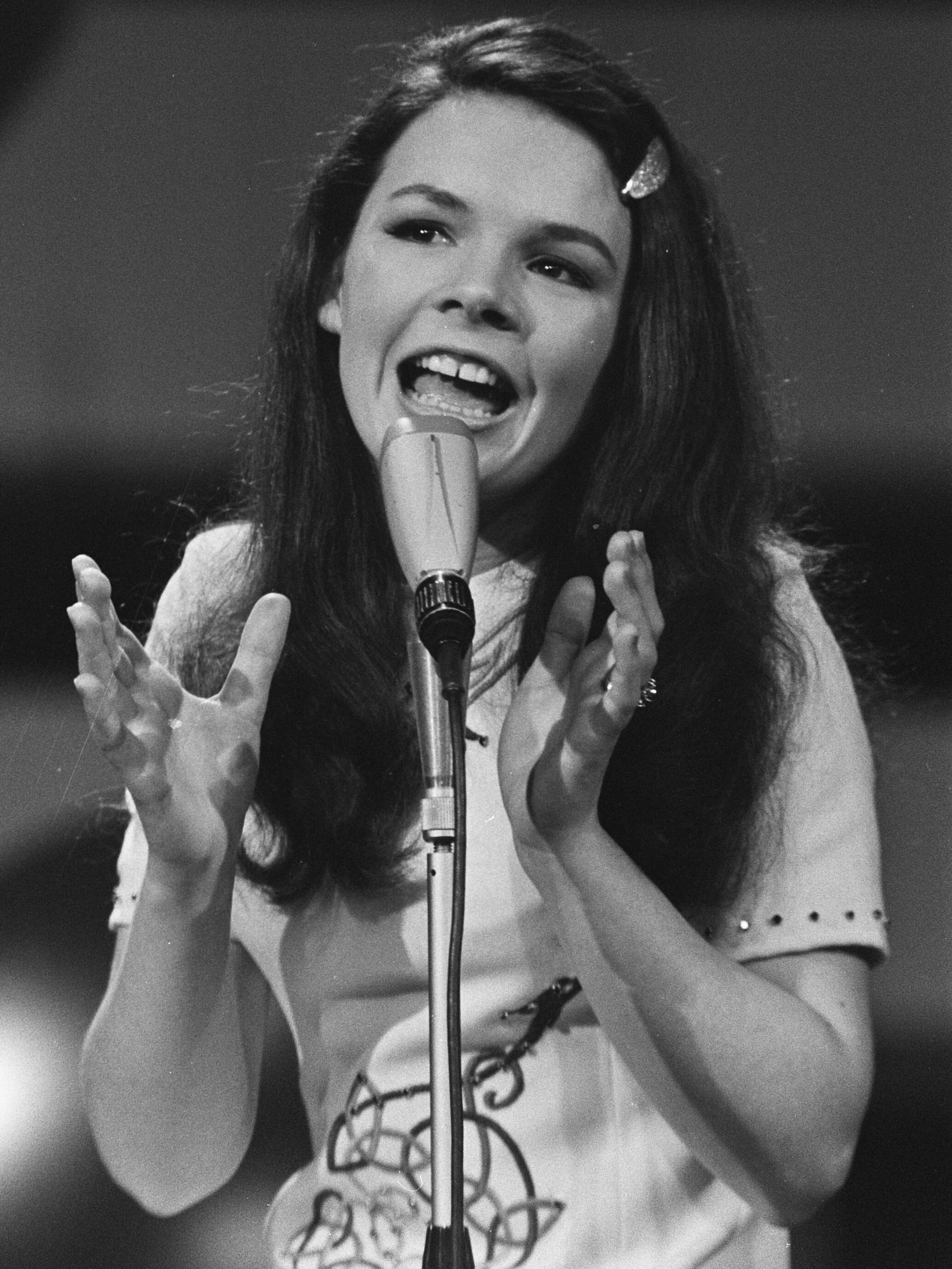
Dana singing at the Eurovision Song Contest 1970.

In December 1969 Tom McGrath, producer of the Irish National Song Contest, invited Scallon to try again next year, feeling that one of the entered songs, the ballad "All Kinds of Everything", would suit her. Her second attempt to win the Irish contest was a success. Then on Saturday 21 March 1970, the nineteen-year-old schoolgirl performed the song at the Eurovision finals held in the Amsterdam RAI Exhibition and Convention Centre, before an estimated viewing audience of two hundred million. Perched on a stool while wearing an embroidered white mini-dress, she was the last of twelve contestants to perform that night. After the voting had finished she was declared the winner with 32 points, beating the favourite, UK's Mary Hopkin, with 26 and Germany's Katja Ebstein with 12. Spain's Julio Iglesias came equal fourth with Guy Bonnet of France and Henri Dès of Switzerland. This was Ireland's first of a total of seven successes in the contest.

The winning song was composed by two Dublin printworkers, Derry Lindsay and Jackie Smith. The single was produced by Ray Horricks and arranged by Phil Coulter. Released on 14 March, it shot to No. 1 in the Irish singles chart before the contest began and stayed there for nine weeks. It also spent two weeks at the top of the UK singles chart on 18 and 25 April. It was also successful in Australia, Austria, Germany, Israel, Malaysia, the Netherlands, New Zealand, Singapore, South Africa, Switzerland and Yugoslavia. The song went on to sell more than two million units.

Scallon's debut album All Kinds of Everything, recorded at Decca Studios in West Hampstead, London, on the weekend of 25 April 1970, was released in June and included four tracks co-written by the singer, as well as a new recording of the album's title track. Her follow-up single was issued in September, but Jerry Lordan's "I Will Follow You" failed to chart. The song that put an end to her one-hit wonder status was found on the album Barry Ryan 3. "Who Put the Lights Out", written by Paul Ryan for his twin brother, was offered to her by their stepfather Harold Davison, the business partner of her agent Dick Katz. Her version, cut with Barry Ryan's producer Bill Landis, proved a strong comeback vehicle reaching No. 5 in Ireland. In the UK it became a No. 14 hit on 13 March 1971. There then followed three years of unsuccessful singles broken only by the Irish chart showing of "Sunday Monday Tuesday", a No. 4 hit in December 1973. This lack of success caused her agent to recommend she join the former head of Bell Records Dick Leahy on his new label, GTO Records.

She debuted on GTO with "Please Tell Him That I Said Hello", written by Mike Shepstone and Peter Dibbens. Within a month of its release in October 1974 it was No. 7 in Ireland. It took until the new year before making its UK chart debut in January. Boosted by Top of the Pops performances on 6 February and 13 March, it climbed to No. 8 on 15 March 1975. This UK success gave the track a resurgence of popularity in Ireland where it rose to No. 7 again, this time in February. She also recorded a German version of the song. "Spiel nicht mit mir und meinem Glück" was a No. 27 hit in that country the same year. Scallon made a number of foreign singles, such as "Wenn ein Mädchen verliebt ist" (German, 1971), "Tu Me Dis I Love You" (French, 1975), and a Japanese version of "It's Gonna be a Cold Cold Christmas" in 1976.

Her next single, "Are You Still Mad at Me", a Geoff Stephens/Roger Greenaway composition, missed the chart. They then wrote another song for her. "It's Gonna be a Cold Cold Christmas" was released four weeks prior to Christmas and gave her her second-highest UK chart position when it reached No. 4 on 27 December 1975. In Ireland it made No. 3, and the following year No. 12. At the end of the year Scallon collected two awards – Best Female Singer in Britain from the NME, and Best Female Singer from the TV Times. The success continued into 1976, with a cover of Eric Carmen's "Never Gonna Fall in Love Again" becoming a UK No. 31 hit on 13 March. In September however, while promoting her new single, "Fairytale", she lost her voice. Her left vocal cord, which had been cauterized the year before, required urgent surgery to remove what turned out to be a non-malignant growth, as well as a small part of the cord itself. This caused some newspapers to report on the possibility that she might never sing again. Despite her inability to fully promote "Fairytale", a disco number written by Paul Greedus and produced by Barry Blue, it became a UK No. 13 hit at Christmas, and was also her biggest international success since "All Kinds of Everything". But having failed to regain her singing voice after the operation, she contacted Florence Wiese Norberg, a respected singing teacher. With her help she resumed live performances with a week-long engagement at Caesar's Palace in Luton in December 1977.

Barry Blue started work on her fifth album soon after finishing work on Heatwave's second album, released in April 1978. Her final session at Utopia Studios in London ended two weeks before her wedding day in October. Issued in April 1979, The Girl is Back was the first LP she made that contained no cover versions, and the track that rocked the most, "Something's Cookin' in the Kitchen" by Dave Jordan, became its only UK hit single, reaching No. 44 on 14 April. A disappointing result after a marketing campaign that included a new look for Scallon, a music video, life-size posters in major cities, and retailers receiving bonus flexi discs. In Ireland it made No. 22. The album's title track was also released, followed by "I Can't Get Over Getting Over You", which she sang live on Top of the Pops in October, her final appearance on the show. The sad and reflective track "Thieves of Paris", written by Barry Blue and Lynsey de Paul, has been rated one of the "stand out tracks" on the album. They also wrote her 1972 single, "Crossword Puzzle", a No. 2 hit in Thailand.

A new phase in her career began after Pope John Paul II came to Ireland in September 1979, inspiring her to write with her husband the Irish chart-topper, "Totus Tuus".

Outside her chart career, Scallon had remained a popular personality since her 1970 Eurovision win. She had played the part of a tinker girl in Flight of the Doves (1971), a children's adventure film starring Ron Moody and Jack Wild and directed by Ralph Nelson. She also performed in summer seasons at resorts and seasonal pantomimes as well as performing at venues such as the Royal Albert Hall, the Royal Festival Hall and a week of sell-out shows at the London Palladium. Scallon also performed extensively in cabaret venues and was voted Top Female Vocalist at the National Club Acts Awards in 1979. BBC Television gave her two shows of her own: a series of A Day with Dana in 1974 and four series of Wake Up Sunday in 1979. For BBC Radio she presented a series of I Believe in Music in 1977.

== 1980s – Catholic music ==
Having scored an Irish number one in January 1980 with the song that was based on the Pope's motto: Totus Tuus, Latin for Totally Yours, the much larger American Christian market became a possible outlet for her music. Not long after returning home from a promotional visit to the National Religious Broadcasters conference in Washington, opened by US President Jimmy Carter, she was contacted by award-winning songwriter Kurt Kaiser, vice president of Word Records. He invited her back to the USA where she was offered a recording contract. Meanwhile, Warwick Records issued Everything is Beautiful in late 1980. Recorded in September at Pye Studios in London, the LP subtitled 20 Inspirational Songs was advertised on TV and became her biggest-selling album in the UK, reaching No. 43 in the chart on 10 January 1981. It was followed later that year by Totally Yours, her first Christian album for Word Records; the songs "Praise the Lord", "The Soft Rain" and "Totus Tuus" were credited to "Dana and Damien Scallon". As was "Little Baby (Grace's Song)", written while she was pregnant with their first child.

She was soon back in the studios again to make Magic in 1982, a pop album for Lite Records made at Morgan Studios and Maison Rouge Studios in London. It included four songs by her younger brothers John and Gerald Brown, as well as the single "I Feel Love Comin' On", written by Barry White, which peaked at No. 66 in the UK on 22 May. Collaborating with her younger brothers they wrote the official Northern Ireland 1982 FIFA World Cup song "Yer Man", and she recorded it with the full squad before they headed to Spain for the finals. Following this, her second album for Word was completed; Let There Be Love contained up-tempo Christian pop, jazz, ballads, and an old Irish hymn sung in Gaelic called Ag Criost an Siol.

Scallon starred in a West End production of Snow White and the Seven Dwarfs, staged at the Phoenix Theatre during the 1983 Christmas and New Year pantomime season. The venue's first panto broke box-office records and was extended into February. She played Snow White for over fourteen years, each time in a different city, beginning the run at the New Theatre, Hull in 1982.

In 1984 Dana recorded a single "So Clear". It was the theme for the British soap opera Brookside with added lyrics. She performed the song on several television shows around Christmas 1984, but the song was never released commercially.

A tour of America took place in 1984 to promote her two Word albums. Appearances were made in concert halls, churches, colleges and also on TV and radio.

After fifteen years in show business Hodder and Stoughton published Dana – An Autobiography in 1985. It told the story of her childhood, married life and music career, as well as her growing devotion to God. At the same time as her book launch came the release of her fifties tribute album If I Give My Heart to You, featuring her last UK chart entry "Little Things Mean a Lot", No. 92 on 13 July 1985. In Ireland it made No. 27, as did the album's title track.

Due to work commitments in 1979, she was not in the country when Pope John Paul II became the first pope ever to visit Ireland. But she eventually saw him in 1987 at the Superdome in New Orleans, having been invited there to perform "Totus Tuus" before a gathering of 80,000 or more. After her performance the pontiff made his way to the stage to personally thank her for writing the song.

== 1990s ==
=== Catholic music ===
Soon after completing a concert tour of England in early 1990, she took her family to Florida for an Easter holiday. Her break was interrupted by a request to fly to Irondale, Alabama and make a guest appearance at Eternal Word Television Network's (EWTN) tenth anniversary show. Afterwards, the network's founder Mother Angelica enquired if her ex-hotelier husband would like to work there, setting up a retreat centre to look after the hundreds of visitors the network attracted each day. Then, mid-holiday, she sang at a Rosary Rally in Palm Beach, and was asked to write a theme song for the Rosary. The result was The Rosary, an album released with Heart Beat Records in 1991 that has amassed over a million sales around the world.

By August 1991 the Scallons were living in Mountain Brook, close to EWTN's headquarters where Damien now worked. Thoughts of winding down her career were dashed when her husband was asked if his wife would like to work there, presenting a music programme. Say Yes became the first TV series she made for them. Three more followed: We Are One Body, Backstage and Dana and friends. With this exposure she became a popular Catholic music singer, appearing at conferences and public gatherings across America. Heart Beat Records, the US Catholic music label, issued a number of her music and prayer albums.

To help celebrate the sixth World Youth Day event held in Cherry Creek State Park, Denver in 1993, she was invited to sing in the presence of Pope John Paul II the theme song for the occasion, "We Are One Body", a song she composed herself. She also sang at the World Youth Day celebrations held in Paris in 1997, Toronto in 2002 and Sydney in 2008.

=== Politics ===
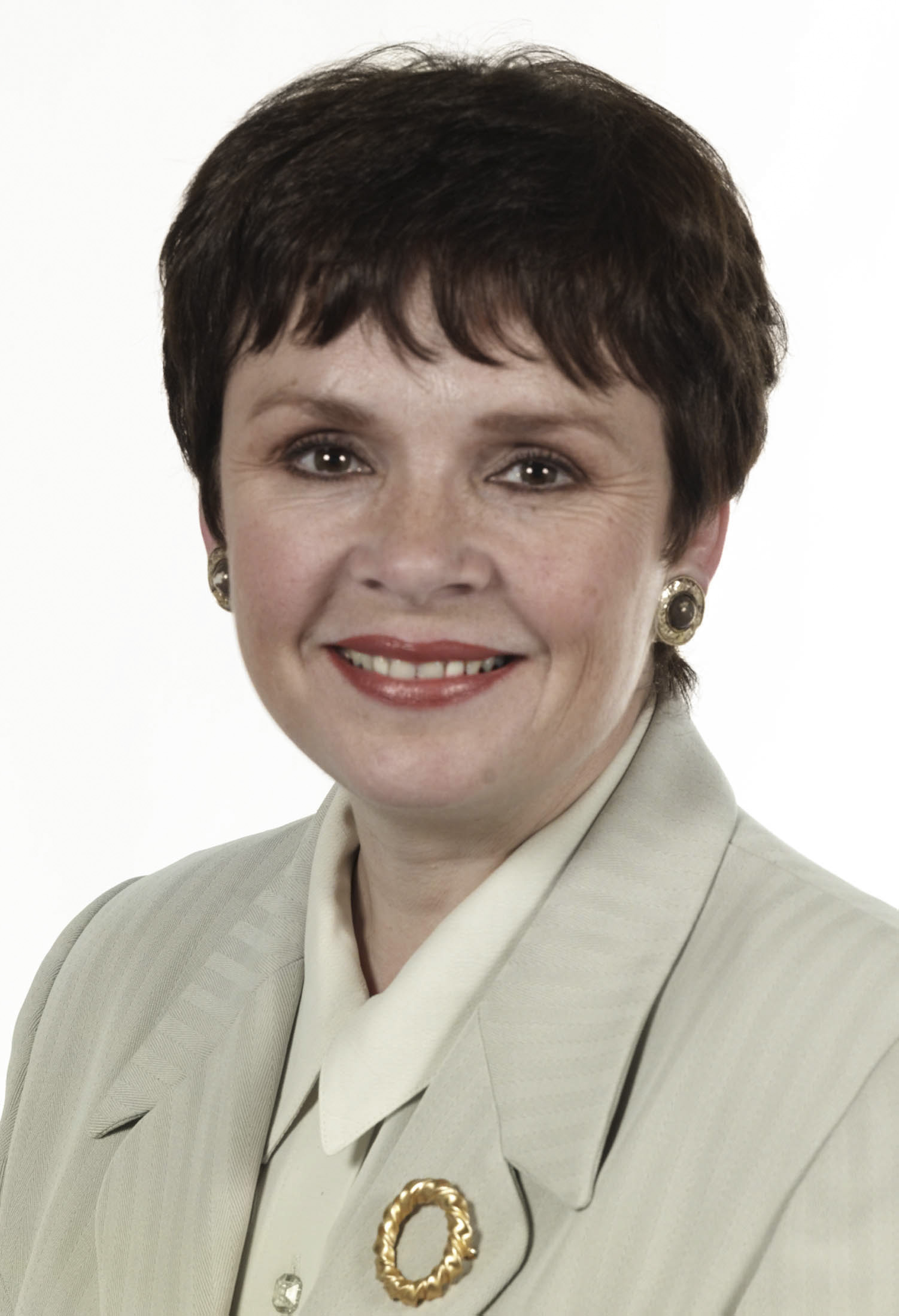
Scallon in 1999

In June 1997, she received a letter from the Christian Community Centre in Ireland suggesting she seek election as president of Ireland. Having no interest in politics at the time, and never having heard of that organisation, she threw the "incredible" proposal in the bin. But they persisted and similar mail arrived from other people. Then the media got involved. She eventually decided to seek nomination as a candidate in the 1997 Irish presidential election, standing as an Independent under the name Dana Rosemary Scallon. Her campaign was based on the Irish Constitution and her belief that it could only be amended with the agreement of the Irish people by public ballot. She became the first-ever presidential candidate to secure a nomination solely from County and City Councils, rather than from members of the Oireachtas. Polling day was 31 October, and Scallon received 175,458 of the first-preference votes (13.8%), coming third to Fianna Fáil's candidate and eventual winner Mary McAleese. Before returning to America she told reporters: "I may not be a president, but I am a precedent."

==== Member of European Parliament ====
She was granted US citizenship in 1999, requiring her to swear an oath renouncing allegiance to any other state. That same year she again stood as an independent, this time winning a seat in the European Parliament, representing Connacht–Ulster. She campaigned on family values and her strong anti-abortion beliefs. Scallon is opposed to abortion in all cases. In 2013 she said "there is no legal or constitutional obligation for politicians to legislate for the deliberate killing of an unborn child and there is no medical evidence to support this radical change to how we treat our mothers and their children and the taking of an innocent and defenceless human life can never be justified". She was also vocal for her opposition to divorce and same sex marriage, along with a Eurosceptic line on the EU. Scallon refused to associate with any political party despite Fianna Fáil making several approaches for her to join them. On becoming an MEP, her eight-year stay in the US came to an end.

== 2000s onwards ==
Scallon also had public disagreements at the time with the Catholic hierarchy (notably with Cardinal Desmond Connell), the latter wishing instead to negotiate a consensus solution.

As an independent she unsuccessfully contested a seat in Galway West in the 2002 Irish general election, scoring just 3.5% of the first preference vote. In June 2004, Scallon lost her European Parliament seat, taking 13.5% of the vote. Later that year she failed to secure a nomination to the office of President of Ireland against the uncontested incumbent.

Returning to the world of entertainment in 2005, she spent seven weeks on the RTÉ television series The Afternoon Show, where she did a fitness routine with a trainer and lost fifteen pounds in weight in time for her eldest daughter's wedding. In 2006, she and dancer Ronan McCormack were paired together in the RTÉ dance series Celebrity Jigs 'n' Reels. They made it to the final show and came second. That same year, Scallon and her husband launched their own music label, DS Music Productions. One of the first albums released was Totus Tuus, a compilation of songs dedicated to the memory of Pope John Paul II and issued on the anniversary of his death. A children's album was released in 2007, along with a DVD in 2008, titled Good Morning Jesus: Prayers & Songs for Children of All Ages, which featured in a special series on EWTN. The Scallons and their new label were sued in 2007 by Heart Beat Records for copyright violations on several of the albums they'd recently released.

Gill & Macmillan published her second autobiography in 2007. Her political career took centre stage in All Kinds of Everything. To coincide with the book launch, her first secular album since Forever Christmas a decade earlier, was released. A Thing Called Love was produced by her and her youngest brother Gerry, who also played guitar and keyboards, while her youngest son Robert played drums.

In 2009, Scallon became a judge on The All Ireland Talent Show, and in the summer of 2010 she participated in the Best of British Variety tour. She was a contestant in the fourth series of the reality television programme, Celebrity Bainisteoir, in 2011, but was forced to withdraw by RTÉ when she announced she would run for the Irish presidency again.

=== Recent recordings ===
In 2019, Scallon announced she was back in the studio and was recording a new album. She appeared on Lorraine, RTÉ Today and several radio stations to promote new single "Falling". The album My Time was released on 1 November 2019.

A double CD containing Scallon's three albums (Have a Nice Day, Love Songs & Fairytales and The Girl is Back) recorded for GTO Records in the 1970s was released on 3 September 2021 by Cherry Red Records.

In 2023, Scallon released a new version of her hit "Fairytale" and gave a series of interviews including UTV Live, Good Morning Britain and GB News.

== 2011 presidential campaign ==
On 19 September 2011, at the Fitzwilliam Hotel on St Stephen's Green, Scallon announced she would be seeking a nomination to enter the following month's Irish presidential election. Carlow County Council was the first to nominate her. She was then nominated by other county councils thus becoming a candidate. There were seven candidates in total, five men and two women.

In the first debate, held on RTÉ Radio 1's News at One, independent candidate Scallon explained she had delayed her entry into the race due to numerous family bereavements. Appearing on The Late Late Show alongside the other candidates, Scallon displayed a copy of the EU Constitution, telling her audience: "This is what this election is about. I have the knowledge and experience to be able to protect our sovereignty and that's the only question I think that's really urgent at this time." When asked by Ryan Tubridy if she would refuse to sign any bill threatening Bunreacht na hÉireann, she responded by saying, "You bet your boots I would". In fact, the President does not have such a veto power, being able only to refer a Bill to the Council of State for its consideration.

Speaking on Newstalk's The Right Hook programme on 5 October 2011, Scallon said: "I am not anti Europe. I have always said that Europe, the concept of Europe is good. We want to be in Europe."

It was revealed on 7 October 2011 that Scallon had dual US and Irish citizenship, but she denied hiding this from the public, saying that her US citizenship, which involved her taking an oath renouncing allegiance to Ireland, was not an issue then or now and she had no reason to hide it.

During a debate on Prime Time (RTÉ) on 12 October, Scallon read out a prepared statement towards the end of the debate, announcing that a "malicious" and "false" accusation had been made against her and her family in the United States and, while refusing to divulge any details, she said she would leave "no stone unturned" in her mission to track down the person or organisation responsible. The incident was described as "bizarre" by some media. It later transpired that the statement referred to her brother, John Brown, who had been accused in 2008, in the course of litigation in the US among family members, of having sexually abused his niece. He denied the allegation. Brown was arrested by London police in June 2012, following a complaint against him made in October 2011. In May 2013, he was charged with three counts of indecent assault on two girls aged under 16.

John Brown was found not guilty and unanimously cleared on all charges on 25 July 2014. Marian Finnucan of RTÉ said he was falsely accused. Brown has since taken legal action against his accusers and a journalist and newspaper. Brown has since won successful libel and defamation actions against a number of newspapers including the Irish Independent and Sunday World newspapers who published false and defamatory stories.

Voting took place on 27 October and the fourth and final count was completed two days later. Scallon received 51,220 votes (2.9%) and came sixth to Labour's Michael D. Higgins.

== Personal life ==
On 5 October 1978 she married hotelier Damien Scallon at St Eugene's Cathedral in Derry, where her parents were married. The couple first met in 1970 at his Ardmore Hotel in Newry, where a reception took place following a "Dana Place" street-naming ceremony in nearby Hilltown, to honour her recent Eurovision success.

As of 2011, the Scallons were living in Claregalway, County Galway.

== Discography ==
=== Albums ===
==== Studio albums ====
- All Kinds of Everything (1970)
- Have a Nice Day (1975)
- Love Songs & Fairytales (1976)
- The Girl is Back (1979)
- Everything is Beautiful (1980) (UK No. 43)
- Totally Yours (1981)
- Magic (1982)
- Let There Be Love (1983)
- Please Tell Him That I Said Hello (1984)
- If I Give My Heart to You (1985)
- In the Palm Of His Hand (1987)
- No Greater Love (1988)
- The Gift of Love (1989)
- Dana's Ireland (1990)
- The Rosary (1991)
- Lady of Knock (1992)
- Hail Holy Queen (1993)
- Say Yes! (1994)
- The Healing Rosary (1995)
- Heavenly Portrait (1996)
- Humble Myself (1997)
- Forever Christmas (1998)
- Stations of The Cross (1999)
- Perfect Gift (2004)
- In Memory of Me (2005)
- Totus Tuus (2006)
- Good Morning Jesus! (2007)
- A Thing Called Love (2008)
- Praise & Thanks (2012)
- Ave Maria (2013)
- My Time (2019)

==== Compilation albums ====
- The World of Dana (1975)
- All Kinds of Everything (1990)
- Dana The Collection (1996)
- The Best of Dana (1998)
- The GTO Years (2010)

=== Singles ===
Year	Title	Chart positions									
Year	Title	AUS	AUT	BEL (FL)	BEL (WA)	GER	IRE	NL	NZ	SWI	UK
1967	"Sixteen"	—	—	—	—	—	—	—	—	—	—
1968	"Come Along Murphy"	—	—	—	—	—	—	—	—	—	—
1968	"Heidschi Bumbeidschi"	—	—	—	—	—	—	—	—	—	—
1969	"Look Around"	—	—	—	—	—	—	—	—	—	—
1970	"All Kinds of Everything"	37	7	1	16	4	1	2	—	3	1
1970	"I Will Follow You"	—	—	—	—	—	—	—	—	—	—
1971	"Who Put the Lights Out"	80	—	—	—	—	5	—	—	—	14
1971	"Today"	—	—	—	—	—	—	—	—	—	55 (Note: Chart position is from the official UK "Breakers List".)
1971	"Isn't It a Pity"	—	—	—	—	—	—	—	—	—	—
1972	"New Days......New Ways"	—	—	—	—	—	—	—	—	—	—
1972	"Crossword Puzzle"	—	—	—	—	—	—	—	—	—	—
1973	"Do I Still Figure in Your Life"	—	—	—	—	—	—	—	—	—	—
1973	"Corner of the Sky"/"Morning Glow"	—	—	—	—	—	—	—	—	—	—
1973	"Sunday, Monday, Tuesday" (B-side of "Corner of the Sky/Morning Glow")	—	—	—	—	—	4	—	—	—	—
1975	"Please Tell Him That I Said Hello"	99	—	—	—	27 (Note: Released in Germany as "Spiel nicht mit mir und meinem Glück")	7	—	18	—	8
1975	"Are You Still Mad at Me"	—	—	—	—	—	—	—	37	—	—
1975	"Rivers Are for Boats" (Denmark-only release)	—	—	—	—	—	—	—	—	—	—
1975	"It's Gonna Be a Cold Cold Christmas"	—	—	—	—	—	3	—	—	—	4
1976	"Never Gonna Fall in Love Again"	—	—	—	—	—	—	—	—	—	31
1976	"Fairytale"	99	19	2	37	21	—	3	—	—	13
1976	"It's Gonna Be a Cold Cold Christmas" (reissue)	—	—	—	—	—	12	—	—	—	—
1977	"I Love How You Love Me"	—	—	11	44	—	—	27	—	—	—
1977	"Put Some Words Together"	—	—	—	—	—	—	—	—	—	—
1979	"Something's Cooking in the Kitchen"	93	—	—	—	—	22	—	—	—	44
1979	"The Girl is Back (in Town)"	—	—	—	—	—	—	—	—	—	—
1979	"I Can't Get Over Getting Over You"	—	—	—	—	—	—	—	—	—	—
1979	"Totus Tuus"	—	—	—	—	—	1	—	—	—	—
1980	"When a Child Is Born"	—	—	—	—	—	—	—	—	—	—
1981	"Lady of Knock" (Ireland-only release)	—	—	—	—	—	23	—	—	—	—
1981	"Dream Lover"	—	—	—	—	—	26	—	—	—	—
1982	"I Feel Love Comin' On"	—	—	—	—	—	—	—	—	—	66
1982	"Yer Man" (with The Northern Ireland 1982 World Cup Squad)	—	—	—	—	—	—	—	—	—	—
1982	"You Never Gave Me Your Love"	—	—	—	—	—	—	—	—	—	—
1983	"If You Really Love Me"	—	—	—	—	—	—	—	—	—	—
1985	"Little Things Mean a Lot"	—	—	—	—	—	27	—	—	—	92
1985	"If I Give My Heart to You"	—	—	—	—	—	27	—	—	—	—
1986	"Everything Is Beautiful"	—	—	—	—	—	42	—	—	—	—
1986	"Lipstick on Your Collar"	—	—	—	—	—	—	—	—	—	—
1988	"Summer Romeo"	—	—	—	—	—	—	—	—	—	—
1989	"Harmony" (with Gerry Brown)	—	—	—	—	—	—	—	—	—	—
1991	"Creggan Vale" (Ireland-only release)	—	—	—	—	—	—	—	—	—	—
2005	"Children of the World"	—	—	—	—	—	—	—	—	—	—
2019	"Falling"	—	—	—	—	—	—	—	—	—	—
"—" denotes releases that did not chart.

Notes

Awards and achievements
Preceded by Muriel Day with "The Wages of Love"	Ireland in the Eurovision Song Contest; 1970	Succeeded by Angela Farrell with "One Day Love"
Preceded by (United Kingdom) Lulu with "Boom Bang-a-Bang" (Spain) Salomé with "Vivo cantando" (France) Frida Boccara with "Un jour, un enfant" (Netherlands) Lenny Kuhr with "De troubadour" (four-way tie)	Winner of the Eurovision Song Contest; 1970	Succeeded by (Monaco) Séverine with "Un banc, un arbre, une rue"
