= Heart Beat Records =

- Founded: 1985
- Founder: Ronald Stein and Susan Stein
- Genre: Contemporary Christian, spoken word, instrumental
- Country of origin: U.S.
- Location: Donnellson, Iowa
- Official website: heartbeatrecordslabel.com

Heart Beat Records, formed in 1985, is an independent record and video company concentrating on releases for and from the Catholic market and founded by a family of Irish-Americans.

== History ==
On October 1, 1994, HeartBeat moved to Donnellson, Iowa. Heartbeat was set up in 1985.

In the year 2000, Phillip Stein, Susan Stein, and Ronald Stein formed a 501(c)(3) non-profit organization. Phillip Stein, son of Susan Stein, was made president of the association, for the first 5 years before stepping down but still remained on the board. The organization was called the United Catholic Music & Video Association and gave annual "Unity Awards" to various artists and producers of religious materials.

In 2006 performer Dana Scallon and her husband Damien Scallon formed their own music production company DS Music Productions. and in 2006 sought successfully, the return of the master recordings from Heartbeat Records. The recordings done under the HeartBeat's Label during Dana's time with them are published exclusively under DS Music.

== Roster ==
- Susanna (Susan Stein, co-founder of Heart Beat Records)
- Phillip K.(Phillip Stein, founding member and president of the United Catholic Music and Video Association and son of HeartBeat founders Ronald Stein and Susan Stein)

== Discography ==
Albums

- 1989 In the Palm Of His Hand
- 1989 No Greater Love
- 1989 The Gift of Love
- 1989 Contemplating Icons (Exclusively licensed from St. Paul Multimedia UK)
- 1990 The Story of Knock (Licensed from Saint Jariath's Diocesan Trust)
- 1991 Dana's Ireland
- 1991 The Rosary
- 1991 No Greater Love Video
- 1991 Lourdes – Pilgrimage and Healing (Licensed from St. Paul Multimedia UK)
- 1992 Lady of Knock
- 1993 Hail Holy Queen
- 1993 There is Life
- 1993 We Are One Body Single – English
- 1993 Somos un cuerpo
- 1993 We are One Body Video
- 1993 Say Yes
- 1993 At the End of the Day – Susanna
- 1993 The Rosary Priest
- 1993 Only Jesus Can Heal
- 1994 Precious Moments – Susanna
- 1994 Dana – Live at St. Louis Church
- 1995 The Healing Rosary
- 1995 Say Yes Video
- 1995 Christmas Joy – Susanna
- 1995 Dana 25 Years of All Kinds of Everything Video
- 1995 Hail Holy Queen Video
- 1996 Dana The Collection
- 1996 The Heartbeat Collection Volume I
- 1997 Humble Myself
- 1997 Forever Christmas
- 1998 The Best of Dana
- 1998 Stations of The Cross
- 1999 Divine Mercy Chaplet
- 2000 Songs From the Heart
- 2000 Catholic Artist for the Millennium Vol. I
- 2000 Catholic Artist for the Millennium Vol. II
- 2000 Catholic Artist for the Millennium Vol. III
- 2000 Unity Awards 2000
- 2001 Unity Awards 2001
- 2001 It's Christmas
- 2001 New York City Angels
- 2002 Ave Maria
- 2002 Unity Awards 2002
- 2003 Tantum Ergo – The Ultimate Latin Collection
- 2003 This is My Body
- 2003 The Family Rosary (Licensed from the Vatican)
- 2003 The Rosary for Children (Licensed from Perth Productions)
- 2003 The Luminous Mysteries
- 2003 Unity Awards 2003
- 2004 Perfect Gift
- 2004 Resting in God's Love (Licensed from Mabley Street Productions)
- 2004 Unity Awards 2004
- 2005 The Passion of Christ (Licensed from Perth Productions)
- 2005 The Rosary for Youth (Licensed from Perth Productions)
- 2005 Litany of the Saints and Traditional Catholic Prayers
- 2005 Rosary for those in Need
- 2005 Seven Sorrow of Mary (Licensed from Flower of Carmel Hermitage)
- 2005 A Rosary of Intercession for the Canonization of His Holiness John Paul II
- 2005 Unity Awards 2005
- 2006 Enduring Love a Rosary for Chastity (Co-Released with Klein Production)
- 2006 A Rosary for Vocations
- 2006 Irish Blessings (Composed by David Phillips)
- 2006 Unity Awards 2006
- 2007 My Father's World (Composed by David Phillips)
- 2007 The Ultimate Traditional Catholic Prayer Collection
- 2009 Devotions and Traditional Prayers
- 2009 Faith Hope and Love – Susanna
- 2010 I Said a Prayer – Susanna
- 2010 Novena's and Traditional Prayers
- 2010 "Little Flower – Susanna"
- 2010 "Golden Rose – Susanna"
- 2011 "Tatum Ergo II"
- 2011 "We Are One Body"
- 2011 "Padre Pio Song – Susanna"
- 2012 "CHRISTmas – HE is Risen"
- 2014 "Rosary For Life" with Fr. Frank Pavone
- 2014 "The Chaplet of Divine Mercy For Life" with Fr. Frank Pavone
- 2015 "ElSanto Rosario"
- 2016 "Beginning of Grace and Mercy – Grace"
- 2018 "Christmas Favorites"
- 2018 "God's Unconditional Love – Susanna"
- 2019 "The Rosary and Chaplet of Divine Mercy"
- 2019 "Traditional Stations of the Cross"
- 2020 "The love of a Family" Featuring Sheila Brown, mother of Susanna
