= Millicent Stephenson =

British musician

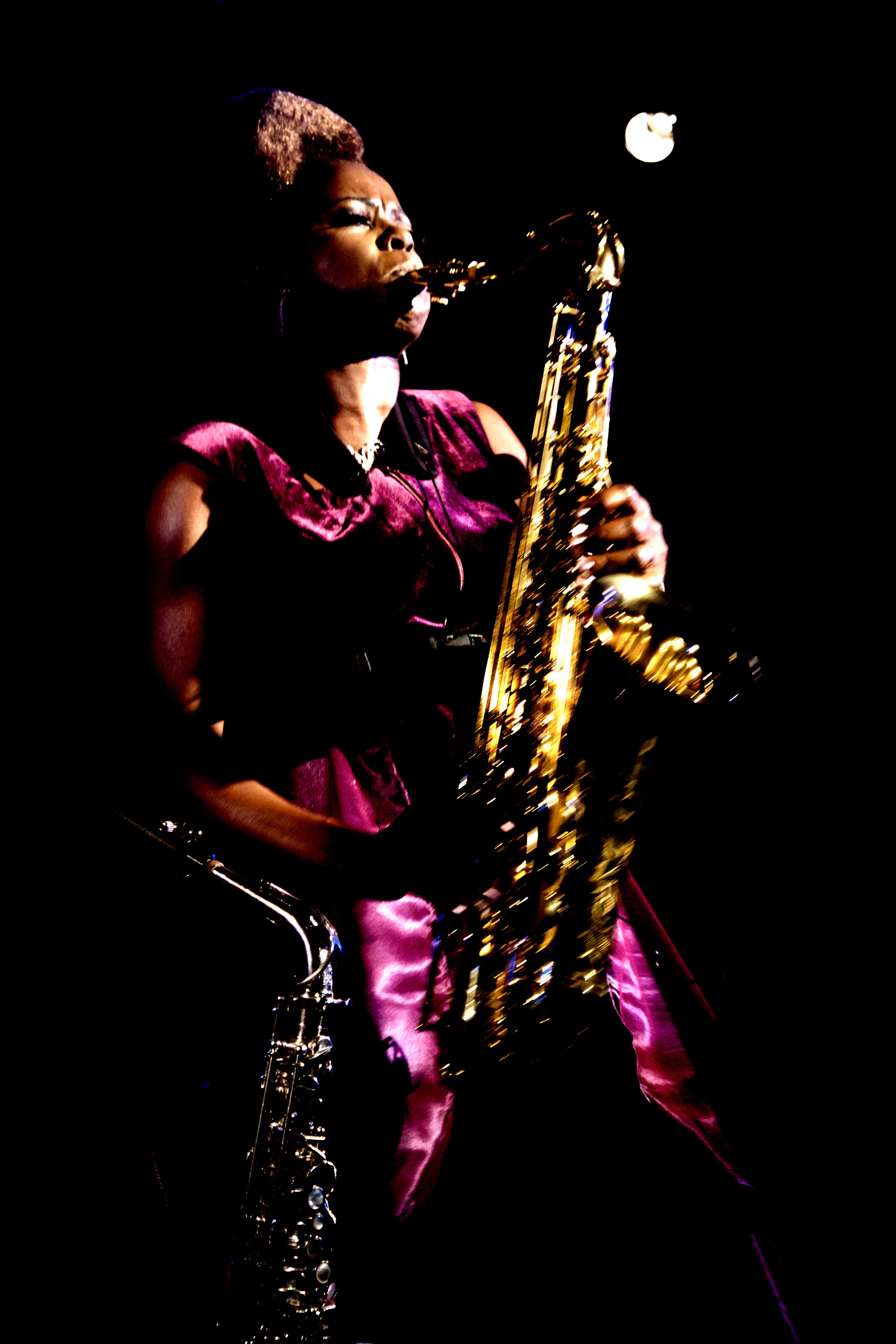
- Born: Millicent Stephenson; 11 July 1963 (age 62); Birmingham, England
- Occupations: Saxophonist, musician, professional speaker, author
- Known for: iTunes Podcast 'Success Beyond The Score', Not Just Jazz, Cafemnee
- Style: Jazz, gospel, reggae, blues, soul, pop
- Awards: The Peoples Choices Award, Association of Jamaica Nationals Chairman’s Special Recognition Award, WISE Women and Keep The Faith Magazine Music Award
- Website: millicentstephenson.com

Millicent Stephenson (born 1963) is a British saxophonist, musician, teacher, songwriter and entrepreneur from Birmingham, United Kingdom. In addition, Stephenson is an entrepreneur, vocalist, music director, professional speaker, record label owner (Silver Gliss Music), and founder and creative director of Cafemnee and Not Just Jazz.

== Early years ==
Millicent Stephenson started piano lessons at age eight. At secondary school she learned the clarinet and played in the school orchestra. She performed in the school Steel Band playing alto and tenor pans. Her love of the saxophone began as a hobby when at age 18, the New Testament Church of God was having an open air street march in London. An alto saxophone was available with no one to play it. She volunteered as a wind player and the leader of the brass section, Rev John Grey, accepted. Following the march she could not let the instrument go, and she borrowed it and practiced.

== Career ==
At around age 22, Stephenson joined Andy Hamilton’s band the Blue Pearl. She was featured in Andy Hamilton's Central TV documentary Silver Shine by Endboard Productions.

Stephenson performs jazz, reggae, gospel, blues and soul with a live band, singers and dancers or solo with a backing track. She created her annual show called 'Not Just Jazz' in 2014. She supports charities through her show. She gave the National Caribbean Monument Charity, the opportunity to highlight the need for a Monument in the National Memorial Arboretum commemorating service men and women of the Caribbean. She also supported Café On The Green which provides meals for people on low income, and SHAPE a women's refuge.

Stephenson set up Cafemnee in 2014, to support female musicians, singers, songwriters and producers. Cafemnee featured in BBC One's Songs of Praise.

Her debut EP was This is Life, launched on her own label Sliver Gliss Music. Stephenson wrote "It's All Good" and was featured on BBC Introducing in 2014 and Ketch A Vibe Radio. "I Will Go On" featured on BBC WM Nikki Tapper Show, and also Bed and Breakfast Show of Spitfire Radio. Stephenson has also written "My Love", "I'd Be Blue If I Didn't Have You" and "Oh Ageing What A Thing", each has been aired on radio and featured on her album, Reflective Notes (2016). Her up-tempo reggae cover single of Tamela Mann/Kirk Franklin "Take Me To The King" aired on the Gordon West World Wide show in 2019 on Kick FM Radio, an international syndicated station and the song was placed on general rotation.

She started a podcast in 2019 called 'Success Beyond The Score' to help musicians and singers who are starting out in the music industry. She is the author of an EBooklet called Revealed - 25 Secrets of the Successful Gigging Musician, Singer, Rapper and Spoken Word Artiste. She wrote the guest blog for the Musicians Union 'Children of The Windrush Generation Make Music'. She wrote the article 'Where Are All The Female Musicians?' for Keep The Faith magazine. In 2018, Stephenson was a guest speaker for WhiiseCon an International Music Conference. Stephenson teaches saxophone, piano and topics related to the music industry.

Stephenson serves on the Midlands Regional Committee and Executive Committee of the Musicians' Union (United Kingdom) and has served on the Equalities Sub-Committee of the Musicians Union.

== Discography ==
- 2012: This Is Life EP (Silver Gliss Music)
- 2016: Reflective Notes Album (Silver Gliss Music)
- 2018: "Take Me To The King" Single (GLR Records Ltd)
