= Crystalate Manufacturing Company =

British plastics and later electronic components manufacturing company

- Industry: Manufacturing
- Founded: 2 August 1901
- Headquarters: London
- Area served: United Kingdom
- Products: sports equipment

Crystalate Manufacturing Company Ltd. was a British plastics and later electronic components manufacturing company that operated in one form or another from August 1901 through August 1990. It is best known for its gramophone records (under many record labels) made of moulded Crystalate plastic.

== History ==
The company was founded on 2 August 1901. It originally produced several items, including billiard balls and gramophone records, using a plastic formulation branded Crystalate that the company had licensed from its American patent holder. The company claimed in advertisements to be the first to press disk records in the UK, a claim neither proven nor disproven, and over time focused more on the music market, producing gramophone record production matrices for more than 20 other companies by 1906, though not operating a record label itself until the 1920s.

After merging with Sound Recording Co. Ltd. (exactly how and when remain unclear), Crystalate Manufacturing became, in 1920, the third company (and the second British one) to operate the Imperial label, and by the mid-1920s had four distribution depots in England and one each in Scotland and Ireland. On 30 January 1928, the company re-incorporated in Golden Green, Kent, as Crystalate Gramophone Record Manufacturing Co. Ltd. 1928 also saw Crystalate taking over West Hampstead Town Hall at 165 Broadhurst Gardens in London, and moving its recording studio there. It subsequently established affiliates in France and Germany, set up a new headquarters, Crystalate House, in London, and bought a one-third interest in the American Record Corporation conglomerate in 1929. Brands pressed by Crystalate included Crown and Rex Records.

The company saw financial difficulties, like so many others, throughout the Great Depression. After years of stiff competition from EMI (later the fourth Imperial Records producer) and British Homophone, among a total of 22 British record labels in the mid-1930s, Crystalate Manufacturing's troubled record section was bought out by Decca Records for US$200,000 in 1937. However, it continued making non-recording products as Crystalate Ltd.

The company continued on in the electronic components industry at least into the early 1990s as Crystalate Holdings, which manufactured resistors in the UK, with annual sales of $180 million as of 1990. In November 1983, Crystalate bought Royal Worcester for £23 million in a hostile takeover in order to acquire Welwyn Electronics, selling the china and ceramics divisions to the London Rubber Company and Coors Porcelain Company the next year. Crystalate was chaired in the late 1980s by Lord Jenkin of Roding. In 1989, the company issued a profit warning – net profits having plateaued since 1984 – and in 1990 Vishay Intertechnology bid to buy Crystalate Holdings, but was turned down in favour of a British company, TT Group, in August 1990. TT Group became TT Electronics in 2000.
