= Crystalate =

Early plastic used in gramophone records

Crystalate is an early plastic, a formulation of nitrocellulose, camphor, and alcohol invented in the late 19th century and patented by American inventor George Henry Burt. It is best known as a material for gramophone records produced in the UK by Crystalate Manufacturing Company (although Burt's own US-based Globe Record Company also manufactured Crystalate records), and for moulded billiards, pool and snooker balls, as produced by the Endolithic Company (UK, later the Composition Billiard Ball Company).

Crystalate was based on Bonzoline, a plastic produced by John Wesley Hyatt's US-based Albany Billiard Ball Company. Burt, a former Albany employee, began manufacturing what was essentially Bonzoline in the UK in 1900 as crystalate with Percy Warnford-Davis, under the Endolithic name. While Crystalate as a plastic material is obsolete and no longer manufactured. Like Celluloid and Bakelite it is commonly encountered by collectors of vintage and antique goods, because many products were made using the substance. The plastic was even mandated in the UK for making billiard balls by the Billiards Association and Control Council in 1926.

Super Crystalate is a brand name for a composition material, a cast rather than moulded resin, first produced by Composition Billiard Ball in 1972 as a replacement for Crystalate. Super Crystalate is no longer manufactured but it continues as a trade name on the Aramith Super Crystalate snooker ball sets that are made from phenolic resin.

== See also ==
- Celluloid, a similar "camphorised" nitrocellulose-based plastic
- Nitrocellulose § Use
