= Birmingham Jazz =

Birmingham Jazz (or BJazz) is a voluntary, non-profit organisation responsible for promoting and commissioning jazz and related contemporary music in the UK.

== Organisation ==
The Founder of BJazz was George West who decided a regular club venue was needed and set one up; its first base was the splendid Grand Hotel in the city centre. George was supported by a group of jazz fan volunteers including the late William Shaw (who have also started JazzCoventry the year before) & Phil Rose who was destined to become the Artistic Director in 2012. For five years a regular programme was presented in the Hotel’s Grovenor Suite and Banqueting Hall. One notable landmark was an annual gig by Stan Tracey, who subsequently became the Honorary President. From the early 1980s an expanded group of enthusiasts carried BJazz forward, creating a Charity and Company status. The venue changed to the Strathallen on Hagley Road presenting the new jazz stars part of the 1980’s explosion of interest. In subsequent years the organisation become established with regular financial support from Arts Council England and Birmingham City Council venues around the city were used including the Midlands Arts Centre, Custard Factory and Birmingham Conservatoire. The programme of work expanded to include education projects and commissioning new works.

Tony Dudley-Evans was chair of Birmingham Jazz from 1992 to 2009 when he became artistic director. He remained as artistic director until 2012 when he unilaterally transferred the grant funding to Jazzlines part of Town Hall and Symphony Hall.

In 2012 some of the legacy of the work of Birmingham Jazz was transferred to Jazzlines, Town Hall and Symphony Hall's programme of live jazz performances and education projects.

Birmingham Jazz has continued running a jazz club organisation run by a Board of Volunteers led by Phil Rose. Since 2012 BJazz has established a strong club venue and a whole series of Festivals to date.

== Birmingham Jazz chronology ==
- 1976: first gig.
- 1979: brings CMN tours to Birmingham for the first time.
- 1985: begin presenting regular, paid gigs for local musicians.
- 1989: awards its first commission to Mike Gibbs.
- 1991: began presenting The Series in partnership with BCMG.
- 1993: The Series wins the Prudential Award.
- 1993: starts collaboration with SAMPAD
- 1996: wins the Foundation for Sports and Arts Award.
- 1999: wins the PRS and Jazz Services Promoter Award.
- 2004: Sound It Out is the first community project organised by Birmingham Jazz.
- 2005: With Symphony Hall, BJS presents Birmingham's first World Jazz Weekend.

The activities of Birmingham Jazz can be categorised under three headings: Entertaining, Education and Embracing.

== Entertaining ==
Birmingham Jazz presents music across the spectrum of contemporary jazz. This includes artists of international and national standing as well as musicians from the region. The Birmingham Jazz programme is noted for its eclectic nature – mixing contemporary jazz with classical music, folk, world musics and urban and hip-hop based jazz.

Birmingham Jazz use venues in the central Birmingham area, including: the CBSO Centre, The Jam House, mac and the Medicine Bar, ArtsFest, The Rainbow in Digbeth, as well as The Glee Club and The Drum.

== Educating ==
Birmingham Jazz has organised Weekend Schools from 1991. Tutors included teachers from the Guildhall School of Music and the Glamorgan Summer Schools, as well as teachers from the Birmingham Conservatoire

In 2003/4 Birmingham Jazz co-operated with Sound it Out to present their first community-based education project. This was with students from Hampstead Hall and Hodge Hill Schools.

The next year, Ways into Improvisation was expanded to include Holyhead Secondary and Grestone Primary Schools. Out of these projects came a new band ‘The Void’, which has also performed in front of Birmingham Jazz audiences

With visiting artists, Birmingham Jazz have organised master classes at the Birmingham Conservatoire. Masterclass leaders have included Michael Brecker, Joe Lovano and Dave Holland.

Many Conservatoire Jazz Course students give their first public performance for Birmingham Jazz.

== Support ==
Birmingham City Council, The Arts Council, The Lottery Arts Fund, and other partners and fund providers.
