= Jack Payne (bandleader) =

British bandleader (1899–1969)

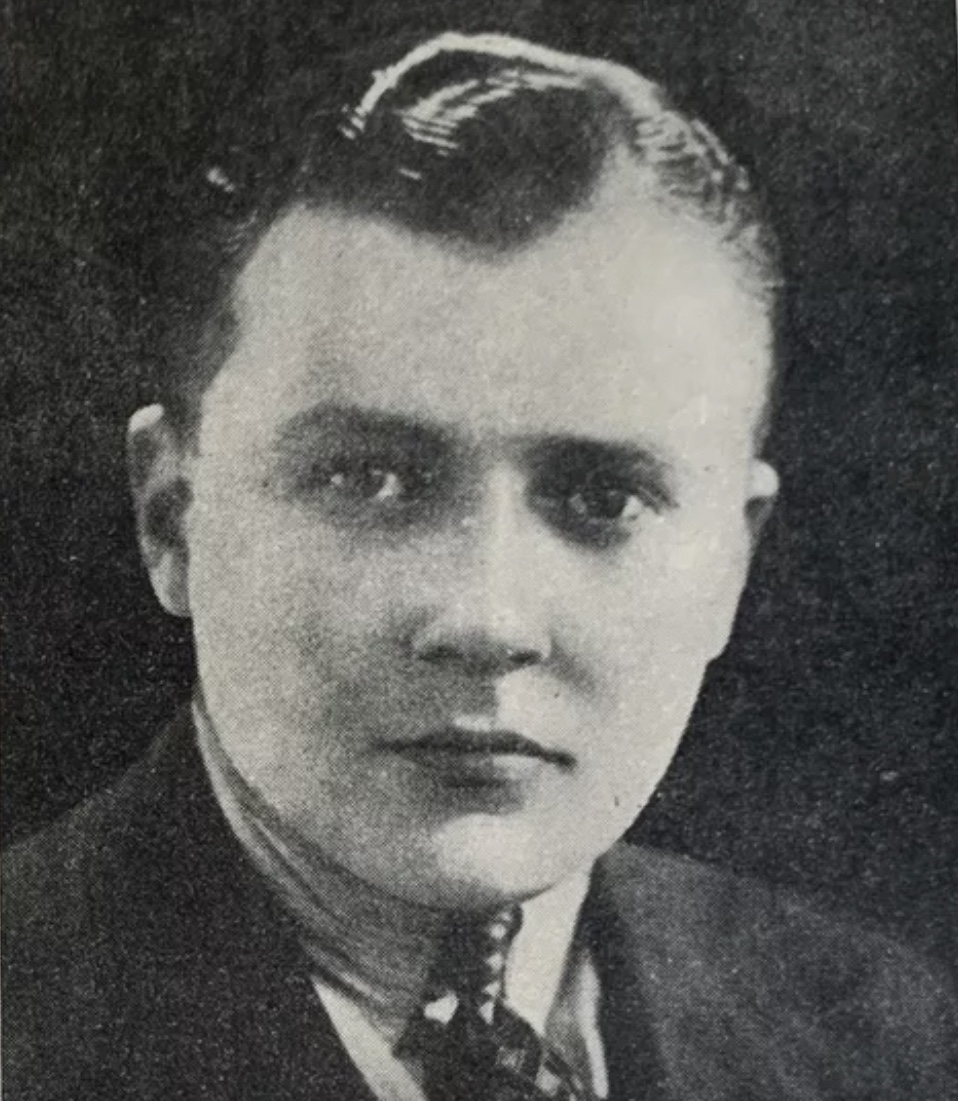
- Jack Payne in 1931

Background information
- Born: John Wesley Vivian Payne; 22 August 1899; Leamington Spa, Warwickshire, England
- Died: 4 December 1969 (aged 70) Tonbridge, Kent, England
- Genres: Jazz, British dance band
- Occupations: Bandleader, composer, vocalist, actor
- Labels: Columbia, Rex, Imperial

John Wesley Vivian Payne (22 August 1899 – 4 December 1969) was a British bandleader who established his reputation during the British dance band era of the 1930s.

== Early life and career ==
Payne was born in Leamington Spa, Warwickshire, England, the only son of a music publisher's warehouse manager. While serving in the Royal Flying Corps, he played the piano in amateur dance bands. After the RFC became the Royal Air Force towards the end of World War I, Payne led dance bands for the troops. Prior to joining the Royal Air Force, he was part of "The Allies" concert party. This voluntary group performed to wounded soldiers convalescing around Birmingham.

He played with visiting American jazz bands at the Birmingham Palais during the early 1920s, including the Southern Rag-a-Jazz Orchestra in 1922, before moving to London in 1925. He played in a ten-piece band which became the house band at London's Hotel Cecil in 1925. This ensemble regularly performed on the BBC in the latter half of the decade. In 1928, Payne became the BBC Director of Dance Music and the leader of the BBC's first official dance band. In 1929, the band was featured in the first ever BBC television broadcast, also appearing in the short film Jazz Time that same year. His signature tune was "Say it With Music", written by Irving Berlin.

== 1930s and 1940s ==
In July 1930, a reviewer from The Gramophone magazine wrote that "Jack Payne's Band is public property. It is paid out of the wireless licence fees which you and I supply...As such its one duty is to please the masses. It has to be good musically, it has to entertain, it needn't worry about anything advanced in the way of style, and the last thing it need be is rhythmically hot. I think we must all agree that it does its job well, and that anything it may at times lack in modern rhythmic stylishness is amply compensated by other qualities more important from the public's viewpoint, such as musical ability and versatility".

After leaving the BBC in 1932, when he was succeeded by Henry Hall, he returned to playing hotel venues and switched labels to Imperial, followed by Rex from 1934. Payne took his band on nationwide tours and made a film Say it with Music (1932), followed four years later by Sunshine Ahead. Payne had three successful waltzes – "Blue Pacific Moonlight", "Underneath the Spanish Stars" and "Pagan Serenade", which he composed and later published in the 1930s. Payne did some jazz recording, including working with Garland Wilson. He toured South Africa and France in the 1930s, but also concentrated his efforts on running a theatrical agency.

== 1940s and 1950s ==
In 1941, he returned to the post of Director of Dance Music at the BBC, remaining there until 1946. He engaged two young teenagers to sing with his orchestra: they were Carole Carr and Lizbeth Webb, the star of the musical comedy Bless The Bride. During this period, Art Christmas was one of the musicians who played with him. Following this, Payne became a disc jockey. In 1955, he returned to the dance music scene to present his own BBC Television programme, Words and Music, which ran for three series. He also made the occasional television appearance as a panellist in Juke Box Jury, as well as other popular music programmes of the decade, including a film appearance as himself in Jamboree (1957). During his final years, Payne ran a hotel, The Middle House, in Mayfield, East Sussex, which was not a successful financial venture.

== Personal life and death ==
Payne was married twice, his first wife having died after sixteen years of marriage. He had an adopted daughter with his second wife, the pianist and composer Peggy Cochrane. Payne wrote two autobiographies, This is Jack Payne (1932) and Signature Tune (1947). He died in Tonbridge, Kent, on 4 December 1969, aged 70.
