= Sonny Bradshaw =

- Born: Cecil Bradshaw; 28 March 1926; Kingston, Jamaica
- Died: 10 October 2009 (aged 83) London, England
- Genres: Jazz, reggae
- Occupations: Musician, bandleader, broadcaster, promoter
- Instruments: Trumpet, piano, flügelhorn, clarinet, trombone, saxophone
- Years active: Late 1940s – 2009
- Formerly of: The Sonny Bradshaw Seven; Jamaican Big Band

Cecil "Sonny" Bradshaw CD (28 March 1926 – 10 October 2009), known as the "dean of Jamaican music", and the "musician's musician", was a Jamaican bandleader, trumpeter, broadcaster, and promoter who was a major figure in Jamaican music for more than sixty years.

== Biography ==
Bradshaw was born in Kingston, Jamaica, the only child of Edgar and Gladys Bradshaw, until the birth of his sister Marion twenty years later. He attended Central Branch Conservatorium and then Kingston Technical High School, and was a regular reader of Popular Mechanics magazine, which led to him building his own radio, allowing him to listen to music from Cuba and the United States. His first job after leaving school was at Montague's Musique on Tower Street, and he taught himself to read music and play the trumpet. His first professional work as a musician came in the late 1940s in Eric Deans' orchestra. He left in 1950 to form the Sonny Bradshaw Seven (he claimed seven was his lucky number), which became renowned for recreating the sound of a 14-piece orchestra with only seven musicians, and later also led the Jamaican Big Band (aka the All Stars Band), which included some of Jamaica's top musicians including Joe Harriott, Dizzy Reece, Ernest Ranglin, "Little G" McNair, Dwight Pinkney, and Monty Alexander. The band also backed the visiting Sarah Vaughan in 1956, the first time a Jamaican band had backed a visiting artist. Other artists that Bradshaw's band backed included Johnny Mathis, Lou Rawls, Johnnie Ray, Brook Benton, and Sam Cooke. Bradshaw was best known as a trumpeter, but played a variety of instruments including piano, flügelhorn, clarinet, trombone, and saxophone.

His career also saw him work as a journalist, teacher (his pupils included saxophonist Dean Fraser and drummer Desi Jones), and broadcaster, with his Teenage Dance Party radio show on the Jamaica Broadcasting Corporation (JBC) (for which he was director of musical programmes, and leader of the JBC Orchestra) playing a key role in giving greater exposure to Jamaican music in the 1960s and 1970s.

For over 14 years he served as the president of the Jamaican Federation of Musicians, during which time he battled to improve the working conditions of live band musicians, whilst also encouraging greater professionalism from the musicians themselves. Along with his wife, singer Myrna Hague, he founded the Ocho Rios Jazz Festival in 1991. He also founded the Tastee Talent Contest in 1979 (later known as the Tastee Talent Trail), which played a major part in launching the careers of artists including Yellowman, Beenie Man, Mr. Vegas, T.O.K., Papa San, Mad Cobra, and Brian and Tony Gold.

Bradshaw was known as the "dean of Jamaican music", and the "musician's musician". He was awarded the Order of Distinction, Commander class by the Jamaican government for his contribution to Jamaican music in 2004. He was also honoured by the Miramar City Commission at a ceremony to mark the opening of the Miramar Cultural Arts Center in Florida in 2008, for his contribution to music in Jamaica and internationally.

Bradshaw regularly visited the United Kingdom, where he would attend the annual service of thanksgiving on the anniversary of Jamaica's independence at St Martin-in-the-Fields. He suffered a stroke while in London in August 2009, and remained in hospital until his death on 10 October, aged 83. Jamaican Prime Minister Bruce Golding paid tribute by calling Bradshaw "a pioneer whose contribution to Jamaica's music industry could not be quantified". Jamaica's High Commissioner to London, Burchell Whiteman, stated "It is almost impossible to imagine modern Jamaican music without the presence of Sonny Bradshaw. He was a true musical pioneer who dedicated more than six decades of his life to ensuring that Jamaican music and especially jazz was always kept in the forefront and was accessible to all."

== Discography ==
- Jamaica Independence Souvenir Album (1962), Top – The Sonny Bradshaw Quartet
- Jamaica Roots, (1974) – Sonny Bradshaw 7
- On Tour With Reggay! (19??), Dynamic – Sonny Bradshaw 7
- Reggae Version (19??), Dynamic – Sonny Bradshaw 7
- Do It Reggae (1996), Jamaican Gold
- Live (1999), Jamaica Roots – Sonny Bradshaw and the Jamaica Big Band
