= Myrna Hague =

Jamaican lovers rock and jazz singer

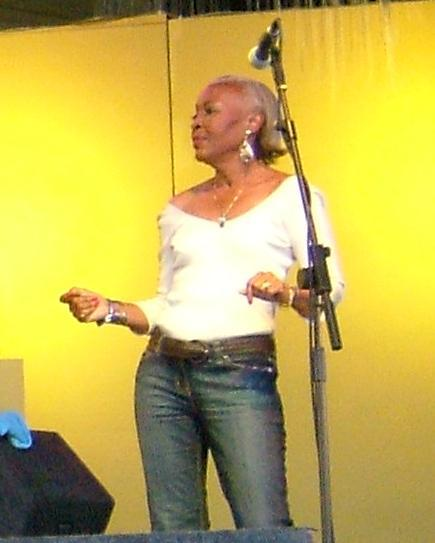
- Hague performing live in August 2007

Background information
- Genres: Jazz, lovers rock
- Occupation: Singer
- Instrument: Vocals
- Years active: mid-1960s–present
- Label: Studio One
- Award: Silver Musgrave Medal

Dr. Myrna Hague-Bradshaw, better known as Myrna Hague, known as "Jamaica's First Lady of Jazz", is a Jamaican lovers rock and jazz singer and actress, who recorded for Coxsone Dodd's Studio One.

== Biography ==
Hague's career began in the mid-1960s. She performed at jazz venues in London and recorded for Studio One, notably the Melody Life album. Melody Life included some of her most popular singles, including the title track, "How Could I Live", and "First Cut Is The Deepest".

Hague is a member of the board of the Jamaica Cultural Development Commission (JCDC), and a former tutor at the Jamaica School of Music. She won the Caribbean Broadcasting Union Song Festival in 1990, and has won the Jamaica Music Industry Award for jazz several times as well as the Jamaica Federation of Musicians Award and Special Merit Award in 1993. She is often referred to as "Jamaica's First Lady of Jazz".

Hague founded the Ocho Rios Jazz Festival with her husband, jazz musician Sonny Bradshaw, and continues to organize the festival.

In 2004, Hague was diagnosed with breast cancer, but after a long course of treatment made a full recovery.

She has toured internationally, recently as guest vocalist with Jazz Jamaica, and as part of Women in Jazz and the Jamaica Big Band.

In November 2012 she received a Caribbean Hall of Fame Award from the Caribbean Development for the Arts, Sports and Culture Foundation.

Since 2011 she has held the annual 'Simply Myrna' concert series, and recordings from the first two years of the concerts were released in December 2012 on the album The Best of Simply Myrna Concerts Live.

In October 2015, Hague was awarded the Silver Musgrave Medal for her contribution to music. Later that month, she received a Doctorate in Cultural Studies from the University of the West Indies, her thesis examining Jazz in the Caribbean.

== Discography ==
=== Singles ===
- "A Song I'd Like To Sing" (1970), Faze Four
- "Best Thing That Ever Happened"
- "First Cut Is The Deepest"
- "For All We Know"
- "How Could I Live"
- "Melody Life"
- "Never Never"
- "On A Clear Day" (1971), Faze Four
- "Our Day Will Come"
- "That's What Friends Are For"
- "Time After Time" (1971), Faze Four
- "Touch Me Baby" Studio One
- "What About Me" (1976), Studio One
- "What Colour Is Love"
- Honey EP (2012)

=== Albums ===
- Melody Life (1972), Studio One
- The Best of Simply Myrna Concerts Live (2012)

=== Compilation appearances ===
- "What About Me" on Feel Like Jumping (2000), Heartbeat
- "Touch Me Baby" on Studio One Lovers (2005), Soul Jazz
