= Bil Keating =

Television and stage producer, director

Bil Keating (died 2022) was an Irish television and theatrical producer, director, lighting designer and founder of the Bil Keating Centre in Dublin.

Born and raised in Allingham Buildings in The Liberties, Dublin, he later moved to London. His training in stagecraft in London in the 1950s led to a director job with the BBC. His productions included Brendan Behan's play The Hostage. He also directed The Late Late Show for RTÉ in Ireland. Keating directed television programmes and was formerly a tutor at the Bil Keating Centre teaching television production.
