= Rex Records (1965) =

Rex Records (record distributors, Irish Record Factors, now owned by Decca Records) introduced the Rex record label in 1965 to supply the Irish market with material by showbands, ballad singers, solo performers, and the like. Among the artists who had their first releases on Rex was Dana, Ireland's 1970 Eurovision contestant, whose winning entry, "All Kinds of Everything", topped the Irish and British charts and amassed worldwide sales of over 2 million. Also released on Rex was a series of recordings by the band the Memories. The label ceased to operate in the early 1980s following Decca's purchase by PolyGram. The label was similar to the classic Decca silver box on black background but with black REX logo on orange or blue background, or silver on green or blue.
