= Rex Records (1933) =

UK-based record label founded in 1933

- Parent company: British Imperial Records (1933 - 1937) Decca Records (1937 - 1948)
- Founded: September 1933
- Founder: Crystalate Gramophone Record Manufacturing Company
- Defunct: 1948
- Status: Defunct
- Distributors: Marks & Spencer
- Country of origin: United Kingdom
- Location: London, England

Rex Records was a United Kingdom-based record label founded in 1933 by the Crystalate Gramophone Record Manufacturing Company, also the parent of British Imperial Records. Rex released their first discs in September 1933, with the initial catalogue numbers being 8000 or 8001. The company was taken over by Decca Records in March 1937. Rex Records were sold at Marks & Spencer's chain stores.

The label was discontinued in February 1948. Despite wartime limitations, they had released approximately 2,250 discs.

The label name reappeared in 1965 as part of the Decca group. For more information, see Rex Records (1965).

== See also ==
- List of record labels
- Rex Records (disambiguation)
- An In-progress List of Rex records at The 78rpm Community.
- Search all Rex 78 rpm records at the 78rpm Community Index Search
