= Imperial Records (1920) =

UK 1920s record label

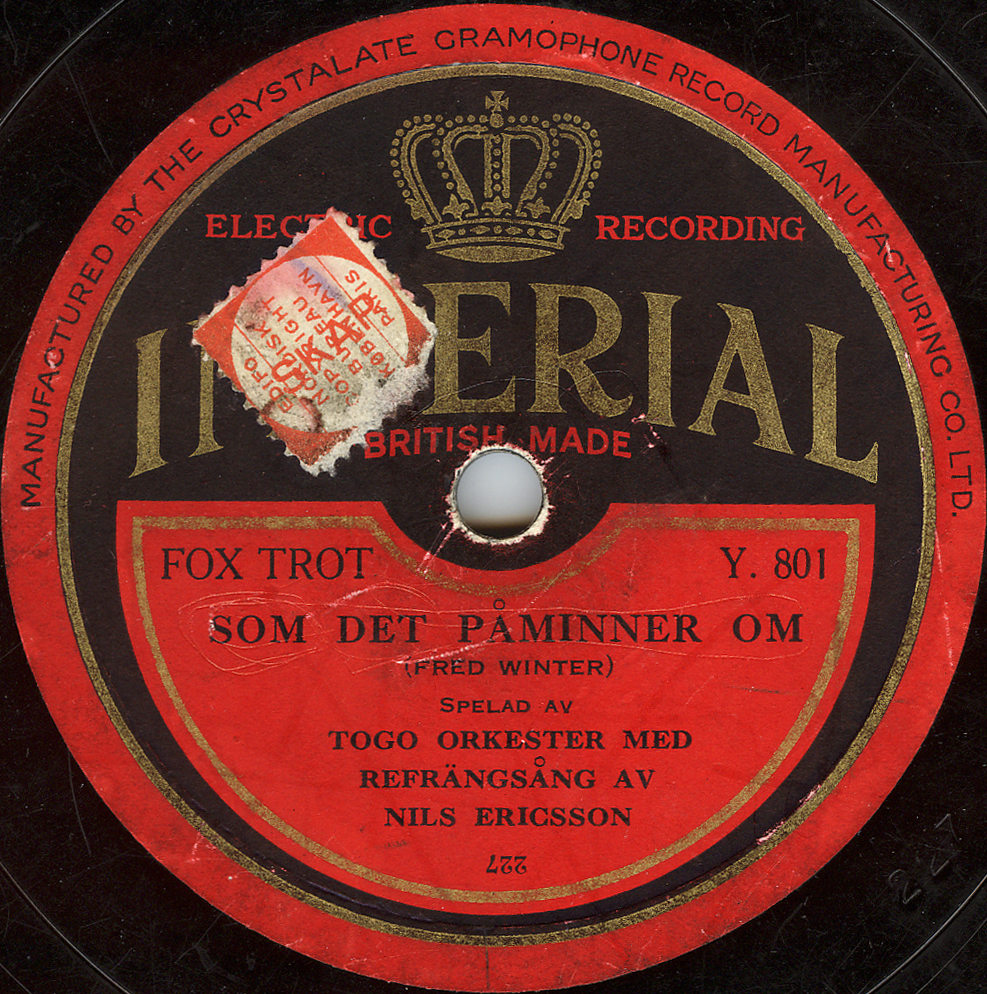
Imperial label of the red type used in the early 1930s. This particular issue is an example of a record pressed for export, in this case to Sweden.

Imperial Records, the second United Kingdom-based label of that name, went into business in 1920. It was purchased by the Crystalate Gramophone Record Manufacturing Company Ltd. in 1925.

The company's main recording studio was in London. Most Imperial issues were recorded by the company, but some issues from masters leased from other companies in continental Europe and from the United States' Banner Records which also appeared on Imperial.

Most Imperial recordings were of popular songs, music hall tunes, and dance music of the time. Their biggest star was bandleader Jack Payne. The label went out of business in February 1934.

A history of Imperial Records, together with a listing of known records issued by the label, is published by the CLPGS in their Reference Series of books.

== See also ==
- List of record labels
- Imperial Records
