= Benny Peyton =

American drummer

- Born: Benton E. Peyton; 20 July 1888; Washington, District of Columbia
- Died: 24 January 1965 (aged 76)
- Genres: Jazz
- Occupation: Drummer
- Years active: 1910s–1950s
- Formerly of: The Jazz Kings

Benton E. "Benny" Peyton (July 20, 1888; January 24, 1965) was an American jazz drummer.

Peyton went with Will Marion Cook's Southern Syncopated Orchestra to Europe in 1919 and remained there, forming his own group in London, the Jazz Kings, out of members of Cook's orchestra. The group recorded two sides for Columbia Records in 1920 which were never issued; they also held a residence at the Hammersmith Palais in 1921. Peyton led his own band (Benny Peyton’s Musical Aces) across Europe well into the 1930s, with June Cole, Big Boy Goudie and Tommy Ladnier among his sidemen. He toured the USSR with Sidney Bechet and Frank Withers (né Frank Douglas Withers; 1880–1952), and in 1935 played with Joe Turner and Adelaide Hall in Zurich.

In 1939 Peyton moved back to New York City, where he became active as an AFM union member. He continued playing professionally into the 1950s.
