= Birmingham Palais =

Former dance hall in Birmingham. England

Coordinates: 52°29′03″N 1°55′16″W

The Palais de Dance or Birmingham Palais was a dance hall on Monument Road in the Ladywood district of Birmingham, England. One of the earliest jazz clubs in England, it was the only major provincial English jazz venue during the inter-war period, an era when interest in jazz was otherwise largely confined to London.

The venue opened on 21 December 1920 with a performance by the Frisco Jazz Band. Benny Peyton’s Jazz Kings, which featured Sidney Bechet, appeared at the venue in a ten-day residency in September 1921, returning for a month-long residency in February 1922. The Paramount Six also appeared in 1922. In late 1921 and early 1922 the house band included Emile Christian.

== Bibliography ==
- Chilton, John, ed. (2004), Who's Who of British Jazz (2nd ed.), New York: Continuum International Publishing Group, ISBN 0826472346
