= The Shirley Bassey Collection =

Compilation album by Shirley Bassey
- Released: December 1971
- Recorded: 1966–1970
- Genre: MOR
- Label: United Artists
- Producer: Dave Pell, Noel Walker, Kenneth Hume

The Shirley Bassey Collection II
- Album cover of the 1975 release

The Shirley Bassey Collection
- 1993 2CD re-issue of The Shirley Bassey Collection

The Shirley Bassey Collection is a double compilation album released in 1971 by British singer Shirley Bassey. The album charted at #37 in the UK charts in January 1972.

Shirley Bassey enjoyed a successful comeback in the early 1970s, having achieved five hit singles in the first two years of the decade, plus two Top ten albums, Something and Something Else. This led to several re-issues of her earlier backcatalogue, these included several compilation albums and complete albums, they were mainly released on the EMI Music For Pleasure (MFP) label. The double album set includes both the album This is My Life originally released in 1968 and Does Anybody Miss Me from 1969. This two vinyl record set was re-released on by EMI on a 2-CD set in 1993, complete with alternative artwork and further expanded to include The Shirley Bassey Collection II, a second double album set from 1975, featuring tracks recorded in the period 1966 to 1969. Most notably this compilation included several previously unreleased recordings and recordings previously only available in the US.

== Track listing ==
Disc one: The Shirley Bassey Collection

1. "Does Anybody Miss Me" (Les Reed, Johnny Worth) - 2.25
2. "I'll Never Fall in Love Again" (Burt Bacharach, Hal David) - 2.50
3. "Never, Never, No" (David Buskin) - 2.59
4. "Picture Puzzle" (Larry Grossman, Hal Hackady) - 2.33
5. "I Only Miss Him" (Carol Hall) - 2.27
6. "As I Love You" (Jay Livingston, Ray Evans) - 2.17
7. "This Is My Life (La vita)" (Bruno Canfora, Antonio Amurri, Norman Newell) - 3.07
8. "Who Am I?" (Tony Hatch, Jackie Trent) - 2.37
9. "Funny Girl" (Bob Merrill, Jule Styne) - 2.23
10. "Sunny" (Bobby Hebb) - 2.42
11. "I've Been Loved" (Sammy Cahn, Andy Badale) - 2.54
12. "Where Is Tomorrow?" (Umberto Bindi, Barry Mason) - 2.39
13. "Think of Me" (Fred Bongusto, Franco Migliacci, Jack Fishman) -
14. "(You Are) My Way of Life" (Carl Sigman, Bert Kaempfert, Herb Rehbein) - 2.21
15. "We" (Rod McKuen, Henry Mancini) - 3.04
16. "Give Me You" (Hal Hackady, Larry Grossman) - 2.25
17. "It's Always 4 A.M." (Sammy Cahn, Ron Anthony) - 3.25
18. "Hold Me, Thrill Me, Kiss Me" (Harry Noble) - 2.53
19. "Now You Want To Be Loved" ("Des Rondes Dans L'Eau") (Pierre Barouh, Raymond Le Sénéchal, Sonny Miller) - 2.55
20. Medley
  - "Goin' Out of My Head" (Teddy Randazzo, Bobby Weinstein)
  - "You Go to My Head" (John Frederick Coots, Haven Gillespie) - 2.53
21. "Softly as I Leave You" (Antonio De Vita, Hal Sharper) - 2.27
22. "A Time for Us" (Larry Kusik, Eddie Snyder) - 2.27
23. "The Joker" (Leslie Bricusse, Anthony Newley) - 2.25
24. "I Must Know" (Neal Hefti, Lil Mattis) - 2.40

Disc two: The Shirley Bassey Collection II

1. "You're Gonna Hear from Me" (André Previn, Dory Previn) - 2.10
2. "Big Spender" (Dorothy Fields, Cy Coleman) - 4.33
3. "Burn My Candle (At Both Ends)" (Ross Parker) - 3.30 (Previously unreleased recording from 1966)
4. "The Shadow of Your Smile" (Paul Francis Webster, Johnny Mandel) - 3.44
5. "Kiss Me, Honey Honey, Kiss Me" (Al Timothy, Michael Julien) - 1.57 (1966 re-recording)
6. "The Impossible Dream" - 2.39 (Mitch Leigh, Joe Darion)
7. "Johnny One Note" (Richard Rodgers, Lorenz Hart) - 2.08
8. "Summer Wind" (Hans Bradtke, Henry Mayer, Johnny Mercer) - 2.46
9. "Walking Happy" (Sammy Cahn, Jimmy Van Heusen) - 2.17 (Previously only available on the US version of And We Were Lovers)
10. "Strangers in the Night" (Charles Singleton, Eddie Snyder, Bert Kaempfert) - 2.32
11. "Look for Me Tomorrow (I'll Be Gone)" (Walter, Marks) - 2.29 (Previously unreleased recording from 1966)
12. "Let Me Sing – and I'm Happy" (Irving Berlin) - 3.01
13. "On a Clear Day You Can See Forever" (Alan Jay Lerner, Burton Lane) - 3.17
14. "It Must Be Him" (Seul Sur Son Étoile) (Gilbert Bécaud, Maurice Vidalin, Mack David) - 3.17
15. "All or Nothing at All" (Jack Lawrence, Arthur Altman) - 2.32
16. "Dangerous Games" (Glen Mason, Keith Miller) - 2.22 (1967 B-side only release)
17. "I'm Glad There Is You" (Paul Madeira, Jimmy Dorsey) - 3.05
18. "That's Life" (Dean Kay, Kelly Gordon) - 2.59
19. "(You Are) My Way of Life" (Carl Sigman, Bert Kaempfert, Herb Rehbein) - 2.58
20. "You Can Have Him" (Irving Berlin) - 5.20
21. "The Lady Is a Tramp" (Richard Rodgers, Lorenz Hart) - 3.36
22. "You and I" (Leslie Bricusse) - 4.17
23. "Big Spender" (Dorothy Fields, Cy Coleman) - 1.51
24. "I (Who Have Nothing)" (Mogol, Donida, Jerry Leiber, Mike Stoller) - 2.39
- (Tracks 19 to 24 are from the 1970 live album Live at Talk of the Town)
