= The Bewitching Miss Bassey =

Studio album by Shirley Bassey
- Released: 1959
- Recorded: 1956–1959
- Genre: Vocal
- Label: Philips
- Producer: John Franz, Mitch Miller

Shirley Bassey chronology
Born to Sing the Blues (1957)	The Bewitching Miss Bassey (1959)	The Fabulous Shirley Bassey (1959)

The Bewitching Miss Bassey is the second studio album by Welsh singer Shirley Bassey. Consisting of new and previously released material, this was the first album by Bassey to be issued on the 12" Long-playing record format. Tracks were taken from sessions recorded between 1956 and early 1959. All the songs were recorded in the UK with Wally Stott and his Orchestra, with production by Johnny Franz. The only exception was "The Wall" which was recorded in New York with Jimmy Carroll and his orchestra and produced by Mitch Miller. Featuring Bassey's first five hit songs, including Bassey's 1958 number one single "As I Love You" and the huge hit "Kiss Me, Honey Honey, Kiss Me". The album showcases the best of the early career of Shirley Bassey. All the songs were only recorded in mono, no stereo versions are known to exist. In the 1970s Philips did re-issue them in an "electronically enhanced" stereo (also known as "pseudo-stereo"). The album was re-issued in the US on the Epic label with different artwork. The album has been issued on CD with two bonus tracks, and is included on the four-CD compilation titled Five Classic Albums Plus Bonus Singles in 2012.

== Track listing ==
Side One

1. "Burn My Candle" (Ross Parker) (Previously released in 1956)
2. "Night and Day" (Cole Porter)
3. "Crazy Rhythm" (Irving Caesar, Joseph Meyer, Roger Wolfe Kahn)
4. "The Wall" (Oramay Diamond, Clyde Otis, Dave Dreyer)
5. "The Banana Boat Song" (Traditional; arranged by Erik Darling, Bob Carey and Alan Arkin) (Previously released in 1957)
6. "The Gypsy in My Soul" (Clay Boland, Moe Jaffe)
7. "Love for Sale" (Cole Porter)

Side Two

1. "From This Moment On" (Cole Porter) (Previously released in 1958)
2. "Kiss Me, Honey Honey, Kiss Me" (Al Timothy, Peter Warne)
3. "You, You Romeo" (Fred Elton) (Previously released in 1957)
4. "My Funny Valentine" (Richard Rodgers, Lorenz Hart)
5. "How About You?" (Burton Lane, Ralph Freed)
6. "Fire Down Below" (Ned Washington, Lee Lester) (Previously released in 1957)
7. "As I Love You" (Jay Livingston, Ray Evans) (Previously released in 1958)

== Personnel ==
- Shirley Bassey – vocal
- Wally Stott and his Orchestra – arranger, conductor
- Jimmy Carroll and his orchestra – arranger, conductor
