= Thank You for the Years =

Compilation album by Shirley Bassey
- Released: May 2003
- Genre: MOR, Vocal
- Label: Sony Music TV Citrus

Shirley Bassey chronology
| The Remix Album...Diamonds Are Forever (2000) | Thank You for the Years (2003) | Get the Party Started (2007) |

Thank You for the Years is a 2003 album by Dame Shirley Bassey.

This album, a mix of new and previously released material, commemorated Bassey's 50 years in show business. Bassey marks the year 1953 as her official entry into show business, as that is the year, at the age of sixteen, she signed her first professional contract: to tour in a variety show called "Memories of Jolson". The album reached #19 in the UK Albums Chart, and earned a silver disc. In a 1999 interview with Nigel Havers in her Monte Carlo apartment, Bassey pointed to a piece of paper framed on the wall and referred to it as her first contract, at a salary of £14 a week (a considerable sum for a sixteen-year-old in 1953). However, upon closer inspection of this document, dated 17 December 1953 (three weeks before her 17th birthday), it appears to be £10 for two performances.

== Track listing ==
1. "Thank You for the Years"*
2. "Mi Amor"*
3. "Can I Turn it All Around"*
4. "I Only Want Some"*
5. "Please Don't Say Goodbye"*
6. "I Just Have To Breathe"*
7. "World in Union" (Gustav Holst, Charlie Skarbek) (Duet with Bryn Terfel) (1999 single release)
8. "History Repeating" (With Propellerheads) (1997 single release)
9. "I Am What I Am" (Live version, taken from the 1997 album The Birthday Concert)
10. "Diamonds Are Forever" (Live version, taken from the 1997 album The Birthday Concert)
11. "Something" (Taken from the 1970 album Something)
12. "Big Spender" (Taken from the 1967 album And We Were Lovers)
13. "Goldfinger" (1964 single A-side in Stereo/Soundtrack album track)
14. "I (Who Have Nothing)" (1963 single A-side in Stereo)
15. "What Kind of Fool Am I?" (1963 single A-side in Stereo)
16. "What Now My Love" (Taken from the 1962 album Let's Face the Music)
17. "Reach For The Stars" (1961 single double A-side in Stereo)
18. "Kiss Me Honey, Honey (Kiss Me)" (1958 single A-side in Mono)
19. "As I Love You" (1958 single A-side in Mono)
20. "The Banana Boat Song" (1957 single A-side in Mono)
21. "Burn My Candle (At Both Ends)" (1956 single A-side in Mono)
22. "Thank You for the Years (Anniversary Mix)"*
- *denotes new tracks exclusive to this release. Frank Gallagher, producer.
