= Kiss Me, Honey Honey, Kiss Me =

Single by Shirley Bassey

from the album The Bewitching Miss Bassey
- B-side: "There's Never Been a Night"
- Released: 1958
- Genre: Vocal
- Label: Philips
- Songwriters: Michael Julien, Al Timothy

Shirley Bassey singles chronology
"Puh-Leeze! Mister Brown" (1957)	"Kiss Me, Honey Honey, Kiss Me" (1958)	"As I Love You" (1959)

"Kiss Me, Honey Honey, Kiss Me" is a popular song written by Michael Julien and Al Timothy. It was first recorded by Welsh singer Shirley Bassey and released as a single, b/w Hands Across the Seas, in 1958 to commercial success (number 3 in the UK Singles Chart). The song was then included on Bassey's album The Bewitching Miss Bassey (1959) and would become one of her most recognisable tunes. It has since been covered by numerous artists.

Bassey re-recorded the song on her 1966 album I've Got a Song for You, and on 1984's I Am What I Am with the London Symphony Orchestra. It was also remixed for the 2007 album Get the Party Started. Bassey has stated that, alongside "Big Spender", "Kiss Me, Honey Honey, Kiss Me" is a favourite among her own songs.

== Track listing ==
- 7" Single (1958)
1. "Kiss Me, Honey Honey, Kiss Me"
2. "Hands across the sea"

== Chart performance ==
Chart (1959)	Peak position
UK Singles Chart (OCC)	3
Norway (VG-lista)	6

== Cover versions ==
- The song was also recorded by Welsh singer Maureen Evans in 1959.
- Scottish singer Lena Zavaroni covered the song on her 1974 album If My Friends Could See Me Now.
- French singer Amanda Lear recorded a cover of the song for her 2006 album With Love and later released a remix of the song on her 2009 EP Brand New Love Affair.
- The song is sung in a nightclub at the beginning of the 1994 film Backbeat.
- The song was covered by Jane McDonald in 2005 on her album You belong to me.
