= Ma! He's Making Eyes at Me (disambiguation) =

"Ma! He's Making Eyes at Me" is a 1921 song written by Sidney Clare and Con Conrad and covered by many artists.

Ma, He's Making Eyes at Me may also refer to:

- Ma! (He's Making Eyes At Me), debut album of Lena Zavaroni
- Ma! He's Making Eyes at Me (film), a 1940 American comedy film
