= Never the Bride =

British band

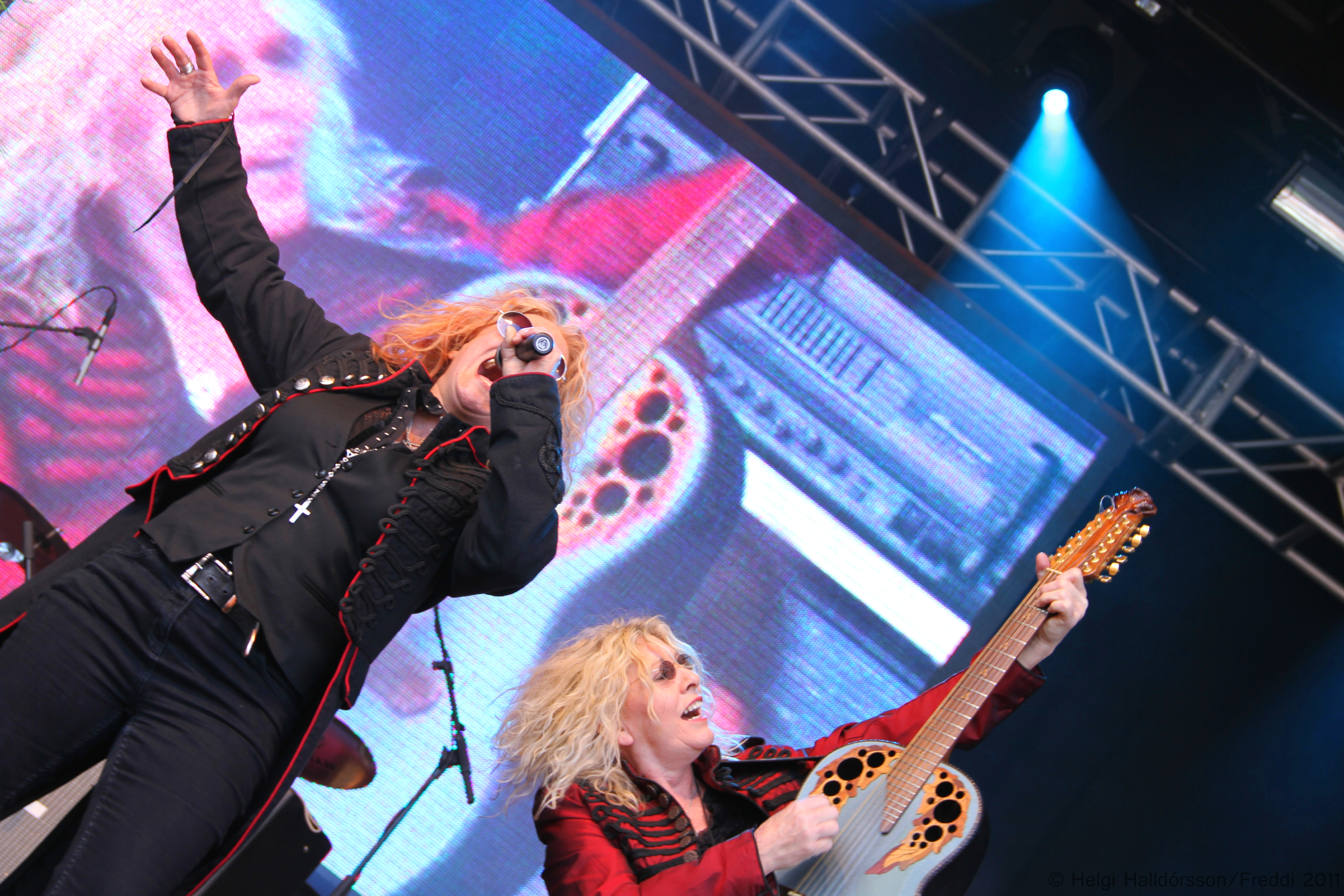
- Never The Bride performing at Reykjavík Gay Pride in 2011

Background information
- Origin: United Kingdom
- Genres: Rock, blues, country, soul, jazz, classic rock
- Years active: 1991–present
- Labels: Lock Stock and Barrel Records; Atlantic Records
- Members: Nikki Lamborn; Catherine Feeney; YoYo Buys; Fergus Gerrand; Murray Gould; David Levy; Richie Newman; Neil Raymond

Never the Bride are an English band founded in the early 1990s. The group is led by singer Nikki Lamborn (formerly known as Nikki "B" Bentley) and keyboardist/guitarist/singer Catherine "Been" Feeney, who co-write the music. The band's sound incorporates classic rock, blues, soul, and country. They have supported musicians including The Who, Elton John, Roger Daltrey, and Paul Rodgers.

== History ==
Their self-titled debut album was released by Atlantic Records in 1995. Also in 1995, Never the Bride recorded the song "Going to California" for the Led Zeppelin tribute album Encomium. Never the Bride toured with British Rock Symphony in 1999. In 2001, Lamborn and Feeney founded Lock Stock and Barrel Records to release subsequent Never the Bride albums plus material by other artists.

Their song "The Living Tree" was recorded by Shirley Bassey for her 2007 album Get the Party Started. The album was produced by Lamborn and Feeney. The song and album were released by Lock Stock and Barrel Records and both charted in the United Kingdom.

== Members ==
- Nikki Lamborn – Vocals
- Catherine 'Been' Feeney – Keyboards, Guitar, Vocals
- Maxime Obadia – Guitar
- Murray Gould – Guitar
- Al Vosper Guitar, Bass guitar
- Dave Levy – Bass,
- Fergus Gerrand – Drums, Percussion,
- Richie Newman – Drums

== Discography ==
- Never the Bride (1995)
- While U Wait (2001)
- Surprise (2002)
- Live at ULU (2004)
- Vancouver 97 (2009)
- In Concert at the Stables Theatre (2012)
- Passing Through (2012)
- Licensed to Bitch (2013)
- Jealousy (2014)
- Surprise (2016)
- Long Live (2017)
- For Better For Worse (2019)
