= Get the Party Started =

2001 single by Pink

- Standard non-US retail artwork, also used for US CD promo single

Single by Pink

from the album Missundaztood
- B-side: "Get the Party Started/Sweet Dreams"
- Released: October 16, 2001
- Studio: LP (Sherman Oaks, Los Angeles)
- Genre: Dance-pop; pop rock; electro; boogie
- Length: 3:11
- Label: LaFace; Arista
- Songwriter: Linda Perry
- Producer: Linda Perry

Pink singles chronology
"Lady Marmalade" (2001)	"Get the Party Started" (2001)	"Don't Let Me Get Me" (2002)

Music video
- "Get the Party Started" on YouTube

"Get the Party Started" is a song by American singer Pink, released on October 16, 2001, as the lead single from her second album, Missundaztood (2001). Written by Linda Perry, the song was originally offered to Madonna, who passed on it. Pink, who was eager to work with Perry, later agreed to record the track.

"Get the Party Started" received positive reviews and became an international success, reaching the top 10 in many countries and topping the charts of Australia, Canada, Ireland, New Zealand, Romania, Spain, and Wallonia. In 2003, Q ranked the track at number 185 on their list of the "1001 Best Songs Ever". About.com rated the song number one in their list of "The Top 100 Best Party Songs of All Time" in 2019.

== Composition and lyrics ==
"Get the Party Started" sample

"Get the Party Started" is a dance-pop, pop rock, electro and boogie song, composed by former 4 Non Blondes frontwoman Linda Perry. She said that the process of making the song was unlike her. She was going through a "weird phase" during which she wanted to learn how to program drums. She programmed her first beat, started playing a bass, and, in her words, "did what the beat was asking me to do." She decided to put "every wrong instrument" in the song, and consequently added in a horn sample. "I was doing the music, the melody was already coming to me in what I wanted the song to be," she said. She then decided to write lyrics containing "every catch phrase you possibly could imagine", before laughing at the realization that she had written a potential hit single and her first dance song. "You create something in your bedroom or your house, and it's just a fun thing that you're doing," she said. "Then all of a sudden, you hear that song that you started in your house, and it's on the radio. And people are now acknowledging it. It's just trippy."

Some listeners thought the song made a reference to ecstasy, the drug of choice for ravers: "I can go for miles if you know what I mean. I'm comin' up so you better get this party started." Pink told Q Magazine in a 2017 interview: "You'd have to ask Linda Perry if it's about ecstasy. I don't know what she meant with it. I still don't know if it's 'I'm coming out...' Or 'I'm coming up...' I don't even know what I sang."

== Critical response ==
AllMusic highlighted the song and added: "This record bubbles over with imagination, as hooky pop songs like the title track rub shoulders with glitzy dancefloor anthems like "Get the Party Started." Jim Farber was favorable: "The single "Get the Party Started" has the tricky synth hook of a perfect new-wave hit from the '80s." NME was less positive, saying it "displays the kind of clod-hopping attention-seeking on single 'Get the Party Started' that makes you assume you're listening to a Geri Halliwell record." Jason Thompson described this song and praised: "the dance inducing "Get the Party Started". Again, even this isn't really in the mold of current dance tracks. Instead, it feels more like the kinds of grooves that were coming out in the early Nineties, when alt-rock was influencing the discos as well as the college charts. In fact, it sounds a little like Apollo Smile who had an album out back in '91 or so. "Get the Party Started" also echoes the good time vibe that other hits like Deee-Lite's "Groove Is in the Heart" had that won over many fans. This track should do just the same thing. It did for me, anyway."

Slant Magazine called this song "retro-dipped dance-pop." Sputnikmusic marked it as a highlight and added: "It is not all slow and serious going though, as 1st single 'Get The Party Started' proves. As the song title suggests, this is the dance-oriented party-starter that the artist's debut album lacked." Stylus magazine called the song "near perfection." Max Mohenu of Espresso said that the song felt "fun and imaginative, and challenged what it meant to be a successful pop artist who didn't have the Britney Spears look." The song was nominated for a Grammy Award in 2003 in the category of Best Female Pop Vocal Performance, which it lost to Norah Jones's "Don't Know Why" at the 45th Annual Grammy Awards. It won the award for Favorite Song at the 2002 Kids' Choice Awards, and won Best Song at the 2002 MTV Europe Music Awards.

== Commercial performance ==
"Get the Party Started" reached number four on the US Billboard Hot 100 on December 29, 2001, becoming one of Pink's biggest solo hits in the US with "Most Girls" also reaching number four on the Billboard Hot 100 in 2000 and "So What", "Raise Your Glass", and "Just Give Me a Reason" (featuring Nate Ruess) reaching number one in 2008, 2010, and 2013 respectively, and "Fuckin' Perfect" that reached number two in America. The single's success was spurred by heavy airplay in the US, which prompted the song to also peak at number four on Billboard's Radio Songs chart. The song peaked at number two in the UK, where it was certified platinum for sales and streams exceeding 600,000 units. The song reached number one in Australia and number two in several European countries, including Austria, Germany, Italy, and Switzerland. It entered the top five in several additional countries, including Finland, France, Hungary, the Netherlands, and Sweden. "Get the Party Started" is certified multi-platinum in Australia, platinum in Canada, Norway, and the UK, and gold in Austria, Germany, France, Sweden, and Switzerland.

== Music video ==
The music video was shot by director Dave Meyers in Los Angeles. It was filmed from September 22–24, 2001. The video uses an abbreviated version of the song, cutting out the last chorus as well as the instrumentals. Perry has a brief cameo as a bartender.

In the video, Pink is getting ready to go out, trying on different outfits. One of her friends picks her up, and they drive in a car bobbing their heads to the music. However, the car runs out of fuel, so they get out and steal two skateboards from two boys. Pink falls off her skateboard because men in a car are whistling at her. The women arrive at the club but are refused entry, so to get in they use a scaffold to reach the top of the building. Inside the club, Pink changes her clothes and starts to party; in the end Pink dances with two other dancers (Kevin Federline and Georvohn Lambert).

The video was nominated at the 2002 MTV Video Music Awards for Best Pop Video and won the awards for Best Female Video and Best Dance Video.

== Remixes ==
Pink teamed up with Redman and Rockwilder for a remix of "Get the Party Started" using elements of the Eurythmics song "Sweet Dreams (Are Made of This)", titled "Get the Party Started/Sweet Dreams". It is included as the B-side on several single releases. Pink performed the remix during her I'm Not Dead Tour in 2006 and 2007.

== Awards ==
Year	Awards ceremony	Award	Results
2002	MTV Europe Music Awards	Best Song	Won
2002	MTV Video Music Awards	Best Female Video	Won
2002	MTV Video Music Awards	Best Dance Video	Won
2002	MTV Video Music Awards	Best Pop Video	Nominated
2002	Nickelodeon Kids' Choice Awards	Favorite Song	Won
2002	Q Awards	Best Video	Won
2003	Grammy Awards	Best Female Pop Vocal Performance	Nominated

== Track listings ==
- UK CD1 and cassette single
1. "Get the Party Started" (radio mix) – 3:12
2. "Get the Party Started/Sweet Dreams" (featuring Redman) – 4:05
3. "Get the Party Started" (radio mix instrumental) – 3:12
- UK CD2
1. "Get the Party Started" (radio mix) – 3:12
2. "Get the Party Started" (K5 Werk Kraft Mix featuring Spoonface) – 7:02
3. "Get the Party Started" (P!nk Noise Disco Mix radio edit) – 3:44
4. "Get the Party Started" (video) – 3:21
- European CD single
1. "Get the Party Started" (radio mix) – 3:12
2. "Get the Party Started/Sweet Dreams" (featuring Redman) – 4:05
- Australian and New Zealand CD single
1. "Get the Party Started" (radio mix) – 3:12
2. "Get the Party Started/Sweet Dreams" (featuring Redman) – 4:04
3. "Get the Party Started" (P!nk Noise Disco Mix radio edit) – 3:44
4. "Get the Party Started" (instrumental) – 3:14

== Credits and personnel ==
Credits are taken from the Missundaztood album booklet.

Studios

- Recorded at LP Studios (Sherman Oaks, Los Angeles)
- Additional recording at Larrabee Studios (Los Angeles)
- Mixed at The Enterprise (Burbank, California)
- Mastered at Hit Factory Mastering (New York City)

Personnel

- Linda Perry – writing, all instruments, drum programming, production, recording
- Pink – vocals, background vocals
- Bernd Burgdorf – additional recording, Pro Tools programming
- Dave "Hard Drive" Pensado – mixing
- Dave Guerrero – mixing assistant
- Herb Powers Jr. – mastering

== Charts ==
=== Weekly charts ===
Weekly chart performance for "Get the Party Started"
Chart (2001–2005)	Peak position
Australia (ARIA)	1
Austria (Ö3 Austria Top 40)	2
Belgium (Ultratop 50 Flanders)	5
Belgium (Ultratop 50 Wallonia)	1
Canada (Nielsen SoundScan)	11
Canada Radio (Nielsen BDS)	1
Canada AC (Nielsen BDS)	22
Croatia International Airplay (HRT)	4
Czech Republic (IFPI)	22
Denmark (Tracklisten)	2
Europe (Eurochart Hot 100)	1
Finland (Suomen virallinen lista)	3
France (SNEP)	4
Germany (GfK)	2
Greece (IFPI)	10
Hungary (Mahasz)	4
Ireland (IRMA)	1
Italy (FIMI)	2
Netherlands (Dutch Top 40)	2
Netherlands (Single Top 100)	5
New Zealand (Recorded Music NZ)	1
Norway (VG-lista)	2
Romania (Romanian Top 100)	1
Scottish Singles Sales (Official Charts)	2
Spain (Promusicae)	1
Sweden (Sverigetopplistan)	3
Switzerland (Schweizer Hitparade)	2
UK Singles (Official Charts)	2
UK Hip Hop/R&B (Official Charts)	1
US Billboard Hot 100	4
US Adult Pop Airplay (Billboard)	16
US Dance Club Songs (Billboard) Remixes	1
US Dance Singles Sales (Billboard) Remixes	16
US Pop Airplay (Billboard)	2
US Rhythmic Airplay (Billboard)	3

=== Year-end charts ===
Year-end chart performance for "Get the Party Started"
Chart (2002)	Position
Australia (ARIA)	35
Austria (Ö3 Austria Top 40)	10
Belgium (Ultratop 50 Flanders)	40
Belgium (Ultratop 50 Wallonia)	35
Brazil (Crowley)	86
Canada (Nielsen SoundScan)	178
Canada Radio (Nielsen BDS)	40
Europe (Eurochart Hot 100)	6
France (SNEP)	83
Germany (Media Control)	16
Ireland (IRMA)	30
Italy (FIMI)	23
Netherlands (Dutch Top 40)	20
Netherlands (Single Top 100)	34
New Zealand (RIANZ)	34
Sweden (Hitlistan)	16
Switzerland (Schweizer Hitparade)	18
UK Singles (OCC)	21
UK Airplay (Music Week)	8
US Billboard Hot 100	24
US Adult Top 40 (Billboard)	38
US Dance Club Play (Billboard)	45
US Mainstream Top 40 (Billboard)	6
US Rhythmic Top 40 (Billboard)	28

Chart (2005)	Position
France (SNEP)	52

== Certifications ==
Certifications and sales for "Get the Party Started"
Region	Certification	Certified units/sales
Australia (ARIA)	5× Platinum	350,000^{‡}
Austria (IFPI Austria)	Gold	20,000^{*}
Belgium (BRMA)	Gold	25,000^{*}
Canada (Music Canada)	Platinum	80,000^{‡}
France (SNEP)	Gold	200,000^{*}
Germany (BVMI)	Gold	250,000^{^}
New Zealand (RMNZ)	Platinum	30,000^{‡}
Norway (IFPI Norway)	Platinum	
Sweden (GLF)	Gold	15,000^{^}
Switzerland (IFPI Switzerland)	Gold	20,000^{^}
United Kingdom (BPI)	Platinum	600,000^{‡}
United States (RIAA)	Gold	836,000
^{*} Sales figures based on certification alone.^{^} Shipments figures based on certification alone.^{‡} Sales+streaming figures based on certification alone.

== Release history ==
Release dates and formats for "Get the Party Started"
Region	Date	Format	Label	Ref.
United States	October 16, 2001	Contemporary hit radio	Arista	
Australia	December 10, 2001	CD	Arista	
Germany	January 14, 2002	CD	Arista	
Sweden	January 14, 2002	CD	Arista	
United Kingdom	January 14, 2002	CD; cassette	Arista	
Japan	May 29, 2002	CD	Arista	

== Shirley Bassey version ==
"Get the Party Started"

Single by Shirley Bassey

from the album Get the Party Started
- Released: July 23, 2007
- Genre: R&B
- Length: 4:02
- Label: Lock Stock and Barrel
- Songwriter: Linda Perry
- Producers: Catherine Feeney, Nikki Lamborn, Chuck Norman, Bob Kraushaar

Shirley Bassey singles chronology
"The Living Tree" (2007)	"Get the Party Started" (2007)	"Big Spender" (2007)

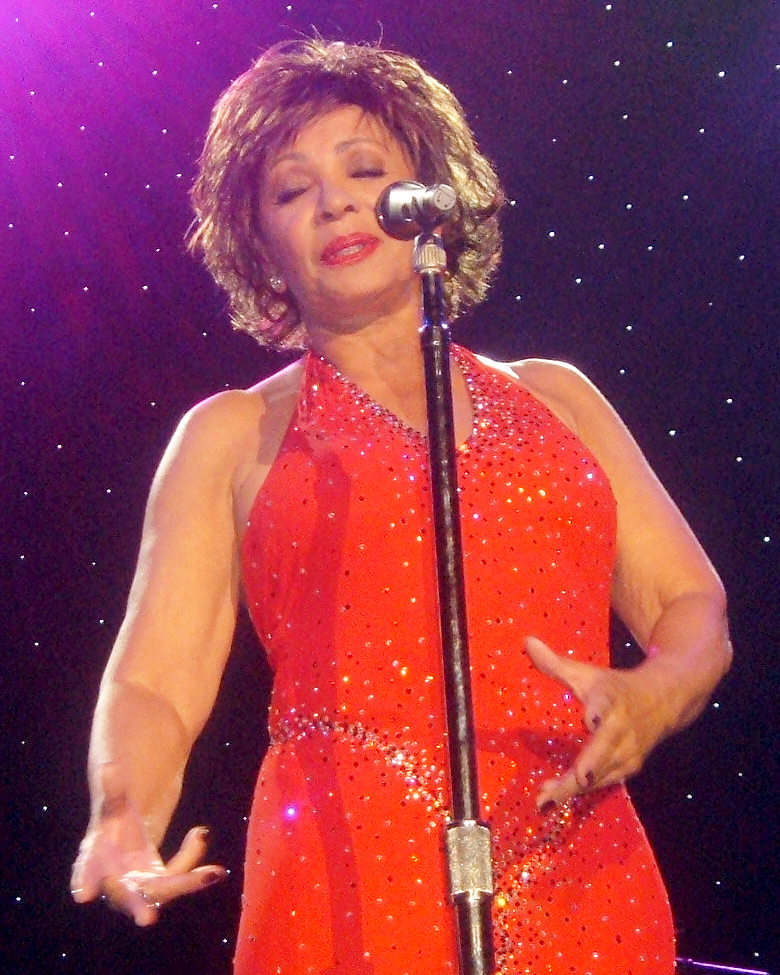
Shirley Bassey (2006)

Shirley Bassey recorded a cover for a spy-themed 2006 Marks & Spencer Christmas television advertising campaign. Her version became a cult hit and was included on her 2007 album, also titled Get the Party Started. The Guardian wrote, "Bassey is the only singer alive who could take the bouncing, enthusiastic R&B of the original 'Get the Party Started' and turn it into a grand, imperious swoop worthy of a Bond theme; it's a terrific cover version, even if it perhaps didn't quite merit the album attached to it."

On January 13, 2008, Bassey's version was used in the opening sequence to the ITV1 series Dancing on Ice. It was also used in the promo for season 4 of Australia's Next Top Model, and Bassey's version charted at number 47 in the UK and ended at the Billboard Year-End Charts at number forty-three in the Hot Dance Club Play Tracks of the year, having peaked at number 3 in April 2008. The track was used again in 2010 for the opening credits of Cats & Dogs: The Revenge of Kitty Galore. The track was also used for 2015 commercial of Honda Stepwgn.

=== Track listings and formats ===
UK CD single

1. "Get The Party Started" (Radio edit) – 3:08
2. "Get The Party Started" – 4:02
3. "Get The Party Started" (NorthXNorthWest Club mix) – 7:21
4. "Get The Party Started" (Fugitives Coming Up mix) – 5:34
5. "Get The Party Started" (Flip & Fill remix) – 5:58
6. "Get The Party Started" (Music video) – 4:00

US digital single

1. "Get The Party Started" (Chris Cox Club mix) – 8:45
2. "Get The Party Started" (Chris Cox Dub mix) – 8:05
3. "Get The Party Started" (Chris Cox Radio mix) – 3:49

=== Charts ===
Weekly chart performance for "Get the Party Started"
Chart (2008)	Peak position
Scottish Singles Sales (Official Charts)	23
UK Singles (Official Charts)	47
US Dance Club Songs (Billboard)	3

== See also ==
- List of Romanian Top 100 number ones of the 2000s
