= I've Got a Song for You =

Studio album by Shirley Bassey
- Released: 1966
- Genre: Vocal
- Label: United Artists
- Producer: Kenneth Hume

Shirley Bassey chronology
Shirley Bassey at the Pigalle (1965)	I've Got a Song for You (1966)	And We Were Lovers (1967)

Alternative cover
- US version

I've Got a Song for You is a 1966 album by Shirley Bassey. Bassey had left EMI's Columbia Label, and this was her first album for United Artists, a label she would remain with for approximately 14 years (until it was sold, ironically enough, to EMI). This album and the following release And We Were Lovers were produced by Bassey's former husband, Kenneth Hume. (Their marriage had ended in divorce in 1965, but he continued to act as her manager, and for these two albums, her producer.) The album entered the UK Albums Chart at #26, but only remained on the chart for one week, and failed to chart in the US (where it was released, with different cover art, as Shirley Means Bassey), despite her having received outstanding reviews for live engagements in New York and Las Vegas that same year, and the fact that the album was recorded in New York. It was an inauspicious start for her at UA, as none of her albums would chart either in the UK or the US until 1970 (save one EMI/Columbia album issued after she left for United Artists, most likely previously recorded material, and one compilation album). In that year, 1970, Bassey would begin to produce more contemporary pop-oriented albums, but here in 1966, despite scoring her biggest hit with "Goldfinger" a year or so earlier, she was still firmly in the traditional pop genre.

The original album was issued in mono and stereo. The stereo version of this album was re-mastered for CD, issued in 2005 together with And We Were Lovers on a 2-CD set by BGO Records.

== Track listing ==
Side One.

1. "I've Got a Song for You" (Al Stillman, LeRoy Holmes)
2. "I'm Glad There Is You" (Paul Madeira, Jimmy Dorsey)
3. "Johnny One Note" (Richard Rodgers, Lorenz Hart)
4. "The Shadow of Your Smile" (Paul Francis Webster, Johnny Mandel)
5. "Kiss Me, Honey Honey, Kiss Me" (Al Timothy, Michael Julien) (re-recording originally issued as a single in 1958)
6. "You Can Have Him" (Irving Berlin)

Side Two.

1. "You're Gonna Hear from Me" (André Previn, Dory Previn)
2. "All or Nothing at All" (Jack Lawrence, Arthur Altman)
3. "Shirley" (Al Stillman, LeRoy Holmes)
4. "Strangers in the Night" (Charles Singleton, Eddie Snyder, Bert Kaempfert)
5. "Let Me Sing – and I'm Happy" (Irving Berlin)
6. "The Sound of Music" (Richard Rodgers, Oscar Hammerstein)
