= The Living Tree =

The Living Tree may refer to:

- The Living Tree (album), an album by Anderson/Wakeman (2010)
- "The Living Tree" (song), a song by Never the Bride, performed by Dame Shirley Bassey
- Living tree doctrine, a Canadian doctrine that says a constitution must adapt with the changing times
