= Born to Sing =

Born to Sing may refer to:

== Music ==
- Born to Sing (Connie Smith album), 1966
- Born to Sing (En Vogue album), 1990
- Born to Sing, a 2010 album by Shanti Snyder
- Born to Sing: No Plan B, a 2012 album by Van Morrison
- "Born to Sing" (song), a 1978 song by Colm Wilkinson

== Others ==
- Born to Sing (1942 film), a 1942 American film written by Franz Schulz
- Born to Sing (2013 film), a 2013 South Korean film
- Almost Angels, a 1962 film, also called Born to Sing in the United Kingdom
- Born to Sing, a musical sequel to the musical Mama, I Want to Sing! and Mama, I Want to Sing! Part II

== See also ==
- Born to Sing the Blues, a 1957 album by Shirley Bassey
