= Wabash Blues =

1921 song by Fred Meinken and Dave Ringle

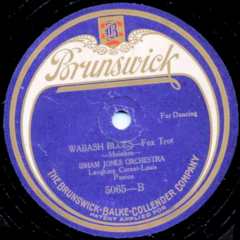

Single by Isham Jones Orchestra
- A-side: "Ma"
- Published: September 16, 1921 Leo Feist, Inc., New York
- Released: November 1921
- Recorded: August 1921
- Studio: Brunswick Studios, New York City
- Genre: American Dance Music, Jazz
- Length: 2:52
- Label: Brunswick 5065
- Composer: Fred Meinken
- Lyricist: Dave Ringle

Isham Jones Orchestra singles chronology
| "Make Believe" (1921) | "Wabash Blues" (1921) | "On the Alamo" (1922) |

"Wabash Blues", with words by Dave Ringle and music by Fred Meinken, was the first major success for pianist, saxophonist and song composer Isham Jones (1894–1956). Recorded in 1921 by Isham Jones and his Orchestra, this million-seller stayed twelve weeks in the U.S. charts, six at No. 1. Other popular recordings were by Benson Orchestra of Chicago, Dolly Kay (both in 1922), Ted Lewis (1930) and Russ Morgan (1939).

The author of the original melody of the "Wabash Blues" is unknown. Though the song was recorded by Isham Jones and his ensemble, the piece was arranged by Joseph E. Maddy. Prior to being called "Wabash Blues", the first name of this significant early jazz standard was called "The Trombone Jazz" and was orchestrated by Joseph E. Maddy in the summer of 1918 at Kansas City's Electric Park - a then summer proving ground for vaudeville artists. At the beginning of Jones' career in Chicago he played in the Edgewater Beach hotel dance band with Maddy and the early jazz sax team of Jones on alto and Maddy on tenor were in great demand—it is through this partnership that Jones came in contact with "Wabash Blues".

This song has subsequently been covered over the years by many artists, including Les Paul and Mary Ford (for their album Bye Bye Blues! (1952)), The Andrews Sisters [1952], Dinah Shore (for her album Dinah Shore – Sings The Blues [1954]), Shirley Bassey (for her album Born to Sing the Blues [1957]), Billy Vaughn (for his album, Golden Saxophones [1960]), Duke Ellington, Ace Cannon, and Paul Revere and the Raiders.
