= Lena (TV series) =

British television variety series starring Lena Zavaroni

- Genre: Variety show
- Starring: Lena Zavaroni
- Country of origin: United Kingdom
- Original language: English
- No. of series: 3
- No. of episodes: 18

Production
- Production location: BBC Television Centre
- Running time: 30 minutes

Original release
- Network: BBC1
- Release: 21 May 1980 – 14 December 1982

Related
- Lena Zavaroni and Music

Lena is a British television variety series produced by Stewart Morris for the BBC. It was broadcast from 1980 to 1982. It starred Lena Zavaroni and followed her 1979 show, Lena Zavaroni and Music.

== Format ==
Lena followed a variety format, featuring comedy and music from Lena Zavaroni and her guests. In the first season of the series, introductions were made by Toastmaster Bryn Williams. Lena generally performed one or two song-and-dance numbers in each episode, supported by a dance troupe with choreography by Ludovico Romano. Musical direction was by Arthur GrennSlade, with arrangements by GrennSlade, John Colemen, and Alan Roper. The Kay Garner Singers performed backup singing.

== Episodes ==
=== Series 1 (1980) ===
No. overall	No. in season	Original release date
1	1	May 21, 1980
Lena sings "Happy Together" and "Together We Are Beautiful". Rowan Atkinson walks on dressed as a concert pianist and mimes playing piano. Lena then sings "Elegance" (with a dance interlude) and "Jump Down Jimmy". She introduces harpist Corky Hale and they perform the song "Desperado" then Hale performs a harp solo. Lena closes the show with the song "Singing Splish Splash".
2	2	June 4, 1980
Lena sings "I Wanna Be There On The Opening Night" and "Daydream Believer". Robert White then sings "Younger Than Springtime". Following a dance routine, Lena sings "Longer" and introduces Paul Daniels who performs close-up magic and a sword-though-the-throat illusion with Lena. Lena and her dance troupe end the show with another performance.
3	3	June 23, 1980
Lena sings "Tin Pan Alley" and "I Don't Want to Walk Without You", then introduces Bernie Winters who performs a short comedy routine with Schnorbitz, his St. Bernard dog. Lena and Bernie then sing "Put on A Happy Face" to Schnorbitz. Following a song-and-dance routine (Step In Time), Lena sings "Take That Look Off Your Face" after which she introduces The Three Degrees who perform "Starlight". Lena ends the show with another a song-and-dance routine.
4	4	June 30, 1980
Lena sings "Could It Be Magic" and "I'm a Believer", then introduces Richard Stilgoe who performs a short comedy routine and comedy songs. Following a song-and-dance routine (I Wanna Make The World Laugh), Lena sings "What's Another Year". Fern Kinney performs "I Want You Back". Lena performs a song-and-dance routine (Dance Yourself Dizzy).
5	5	July 7, 1980
Lena sings "Make Your Own Kind of Music" and "Dream a Little Dream of Me", then introduces Janis Ian who sings "Other Side of the Sun". Lena performs a song-and-dance routine (Lazy Bones) then sings "Without You". David Gates performs "Can I Call You". Lena then sings "If a Picture Paints a Thousand Words" while Gates accompanies on guitar. Lena performs a song and dance routine (Jump Shout Boogie).
6	6	July 13, 1980
Lena opened the show singing "Sweet, Sweet Smile" and "The Magic Is You", then introduces The Nolans who sing "Don't Make Waves". Lena performs a song-and-dance routine (But I was Cool), then sings "Even Now". Les Dawson performs a comedy "Sketch with Lena". Lena then performs a song-and-dance routine (Jump Down Jimmy).

=== Series 2 (1981) ===
No. overall	No. in season	Original release date
7	1	April 4, 1981
The show opens with a song-and-dance routine (9 to 5). Lena and Rod Hull perform a comedy sketch. Lena sings "Someone I Used to Love" and "It's Only a Paper Moon". The orchestra performs an instrumental piece, and Lena sings "Mississippi Mud". Lulu sings a song. Lena and Lulu sing "Fujiyama Mama", joined by Hull. Lena closes the show with a song-and-dance routine (Don't Stop Me Now).
8	2	April 15, 1981
Special guests Spike Milligan and Sheeba.
9	3	April 22, 1981
Special guests Kiki Dee and Wayne Sleep.
10	4	April 29, 1981
Special guests Little and Large and Gilbert O'Sullivan.
11	5	May 6, 1981
Special guests Norman Collier and Nana Mouskouri.
12	6	May 13, 1981
Special guests Dick Emery and Anne Murray.

=== Series 3 (1982) ===
No. overall	No. in season	Original release date
13	1	25 May 1982
Special guests Grace Kennedy and Brian Marshall.
14	2	1 June 1982
Special guest Michael Barrymore.
15	3	8 June 1982
Special guests David Copperfield and Gerard Kenny.
16	4	30 November 1982
Special guests Frankie Howerd and The Nolans
17	5	7 December 1982
Special guests Max Bygraves and Randy Crawford.
18	6	14 December 1982
Special guests Janet Brown and Les Dawson.
