= Hold Tight, It's Lena =

Studio album by Lena Zavaroni
- Released: 1982
- Genre: Pop
- Label: BBC Records (UK, 1982)

Lena Zavaroni chronology
Lena Zavaroni And Her Music (1979)	Hold Tight, It's Lena (1982)

Hold Tight, It's Lena is the seventh and final album by Scottish singer Lena Zavaroni, released in 1982 by BBC Records.

== Track listing ==
1. "Hold Tight"
2. "I'll See You in My Dreams"
3. "Ain't She Sweet"
4. "The Very Thought of You"
5. "T'aint What You Do"
6. "Meet Me in St. Louis, Louis"
7. "Sing, Sing, Sing" / "Christopher Columbus"
8. "C.C. Rider"
9. "Penny Lane"
10. "You Needed Me"
11. "It's a Miracle"
12. "A Certain Smile"
13. "Bridge Over Troubled Water"

== Personnel ==
- Lena Zavaroni – vocals
