= Lena Zavaroni and Music =

Television series featuring Lena Zavaroni

- Ticket for the recording of Lena Zavaroni and Music at the time of recording the show was called Lena Zavaroni and Guests (1979).
- Genre: Variety show
- Starring: Lena Zavaroni
- Opening theme: "Music" performed by Lena Zavaroni
- Country of origin: United Kingdom
- Original language: English
- No. of series: 1
- No. of episodes: 6

Production
- Production location: BBC Television Centre
- Running time: 30 minutes

Original release
- Network: BBC1
- Release: 23 May – 27 June 1979

Related
- Lena

Lena Zavaroni and Music (originally known as, pre-broadcast, as Lena Zavaroni and Guests) is a British variety television programme featuring singer Lena Zavaroni and her guests. Six episodes were aired by the BBC in the spring of 1979. The BBC also released an LP called Lena Zavaroni And Her Music, manufactured and distributed by CBS Records and copyrighted by Galaxy Records.

The show was taped at the BBC Television Centre. Children under fourteen were not admitted, meaning the 15-year-old Lena would've been barely old enough to see the show herself.

Episode 1, broadcast 23 May 1979

- "Music Was My First Love" (Lena)
- A clog dance to the music of Violinski (Wayne Sleep)
- "Superstar" (Lena)
- "Anyone Can Whistle" (Elaine Stritch)
- "Back In Time"/"Jump, Shout, Boogie" (Lena)
- "All That Jazz" (The Ace Eight with Lena, Elaine Stritch, Wayne Sleep and George Chisholm)
- "Thank You For The Music" (Lena)

Episode 2, broadcast 30 May 1979

- "Music Was My First Love" (Lena; a shorter version than the previous week; this became the show's theme song)
- "It's a Miracle"/"Take Me Back To Hollywood" (Lena)
- Comedy sketch with Lena and Adrian Hedley featuring an audio harmonizer
- "Bright Eyes" (Lena) which then leads to
- Silent movie comedy sketch, filmed in sepia, with Lena, Johnny Hutch and The Comedy Hollywood Cops
- "Dance All Night" (Lena)
- Two songs by Grace Kennedy
- "Hollywood Romance" (Lena with The Ace Eight dancers)
- "Could It Be Magic" (Lena)

Episode 3, broadcast 6 June 1979

- "Music Was My First Love" (Lena, shorter version)
- "Can You Feel a Brand New Day"/"Just the Way You Are" (Lena)
- "D, D, D, Dancing" (Lena with Gerard Kenny)
- "Fit to Be Tied" (Gerard Kenny)
- "Doris Day Medley" (Lena and the Ace Eight)
- "I've Heard That Song Before" (Edward Woodward)
- "The Little Old Lady/City Lights and Spotlight" (Lena)

Episode 4, broadcast 13 June 1979

- "Music Was My First Love" (Lena, shorter version)
- "Somebody Should Have Told Me" (Lena)
- "Go to Rio" (Lena and the Ace Eight)
- "Reach Out and Touch (Somebody's Hand)" (Lena with Adrian Hedley)
- "Everything I've Got" (Helen Gelzer)
- Music by the New Sensations Steel Band
- "Razzle Dazzle" [part 1] (Lena and the Ace Eight with Adrian Hedley)
- Johnny Hutch and the Herculeans (comedy acrobatic troupe)
- "Razzle Dazzle" [part 2] (Lena and the Ace Eight with Adrian Hedley)
- "The Carnival Is Over"/"Weekend" (Lena)

Episode 5, broadcast 20 June 1979

- "Music Was My First Love" (Lena, shorter version)
- "Going Places" (Lena and the Ace Eight)
- "Tomorrow" [from the musical "Annie"] (Lena)
- "Dancing in the City" (Lena and the Ace Eight)
- "The 59th Street Bridge Song (Feelin' Groovy)" (Lena with Berni Flint)
- "The Land of Points" (Lena and the Ace Eight with Wayne Sleep featuring Paul Aylett and his puppet dog Arrow)
- "Sweet Gingerbread Man" (Lena with Michel Legrand)
- "Watch What Happens" (Michel Legrand)
- "I Love America" (Lena and the Ace Eight)

Episode 6, broadcast 27 June 1979

- "Music Was My First Love" (Lena, shorter version)
- "Forever in Blue Jeans"/"Corner of the Sky" (Lena)
- "Hallelujah" (Lena and the Ace Eight)
- Dance sequence (Wayne Sleep)
- "Oh Happy Day" (Lena and the Ace Eight)
- Comedy sketch (Johnny Hutch and the Half Wits)
- "Kites" (Lena with Adrian Hedley)
- Peter Skellern singing and playing piano
- "Ease On down the Road" (Lena and the Ace Eight)
- "Don't Nobody Bring Me No Bad News" (Lena and the Ace Eight with Wayne Sleep)
- "Home" (Lena)
