= Hoddesdon Cemetery =

Cemetery in Hertfordshire, England

Coordinates: 51.77129°N 0.01548°W

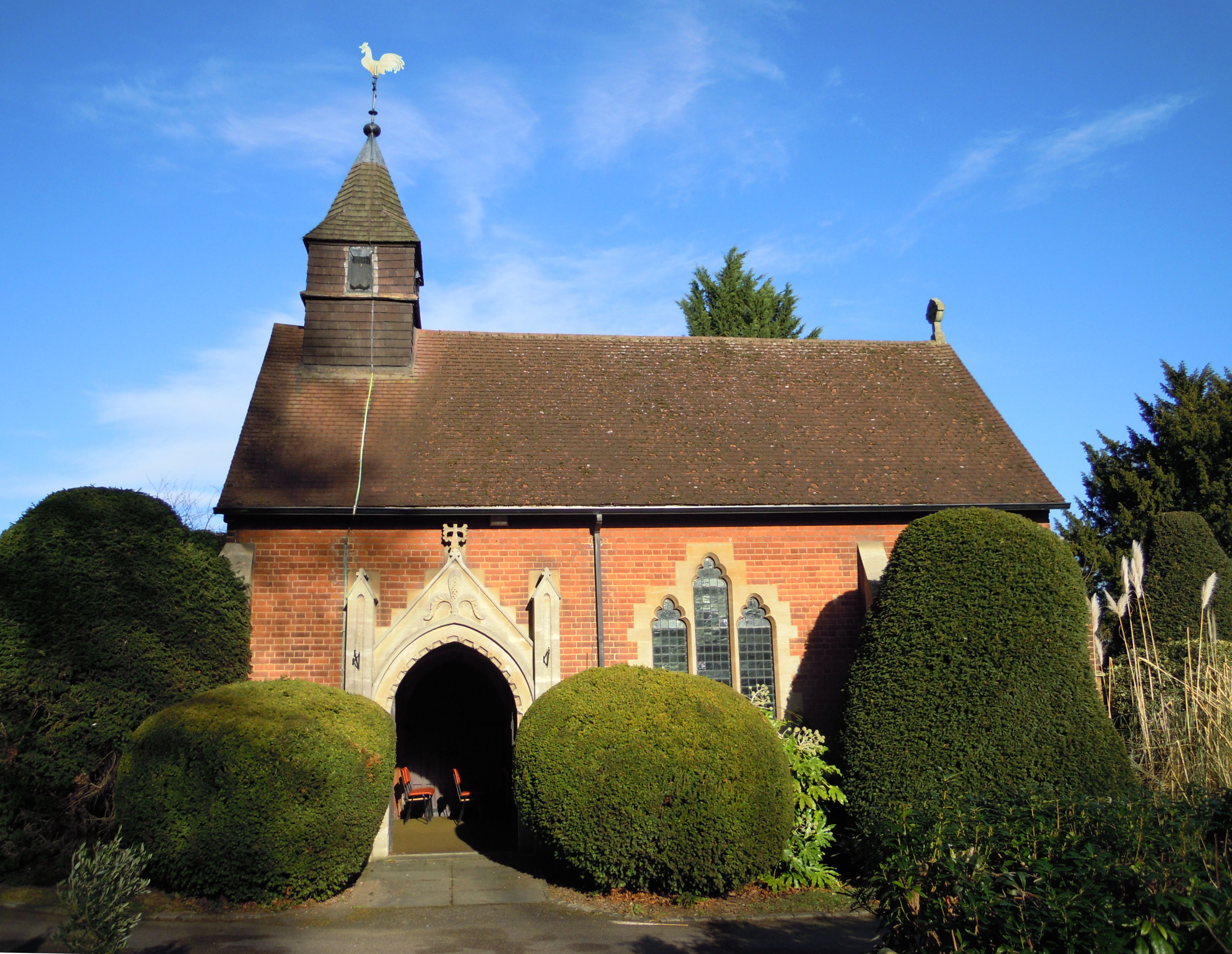
The chapel at Hoddesdon Cemetery

Hoddesdon Cemetery is the burial ground for the town of Hoddesdon in Hertfordshire in the UK and is owned and maintained by the Borough of Broxbourne.

Located on Ware Road in Hoddesdon, the first interment was in February 1883 since when over 11,000 burials have taken place in the cemetery. Among these are nine casualties from World War I and 15 from World War II in plots maintained by the Commonwealth War Graves Commission. The small cemetery chapel is still in use and is usually open during daytime.

== Notable burials ==
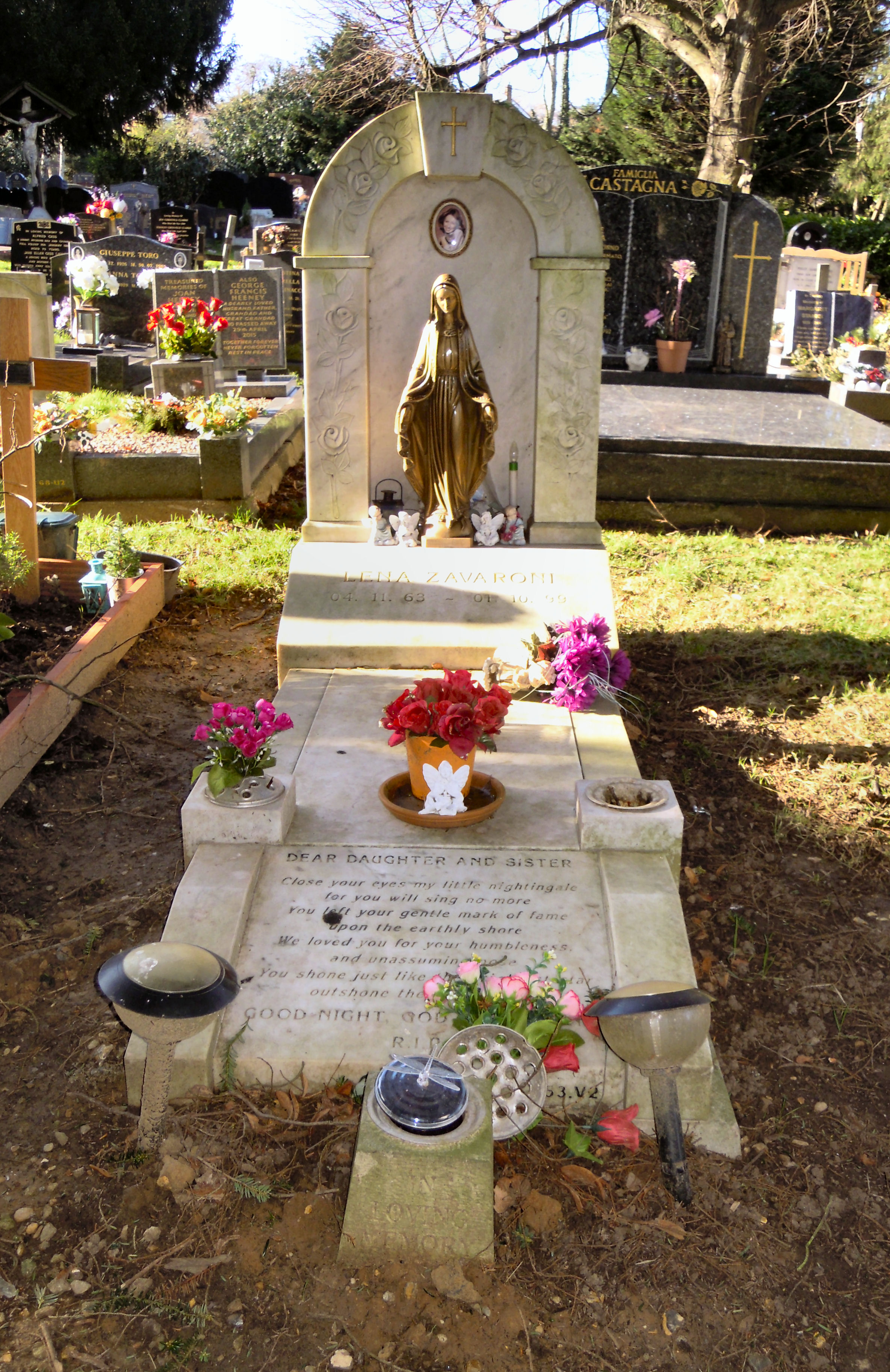
The grave of Lena Zavaroni in Hoddesdon Cemetery

- Lena Zavaroni (1963–1999), Scottish singer and television show host

== Gallery ==
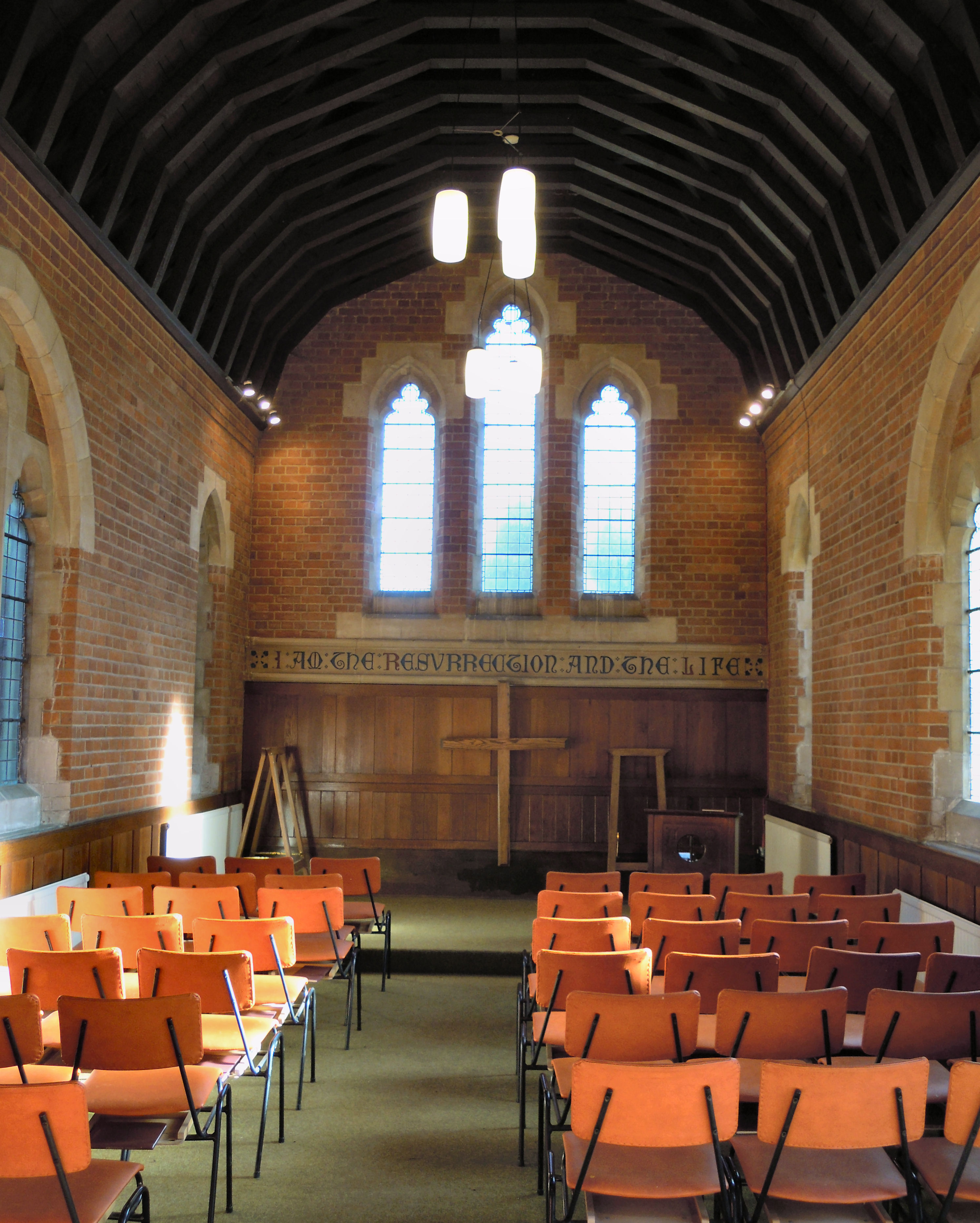
Inside the cemetery chapel

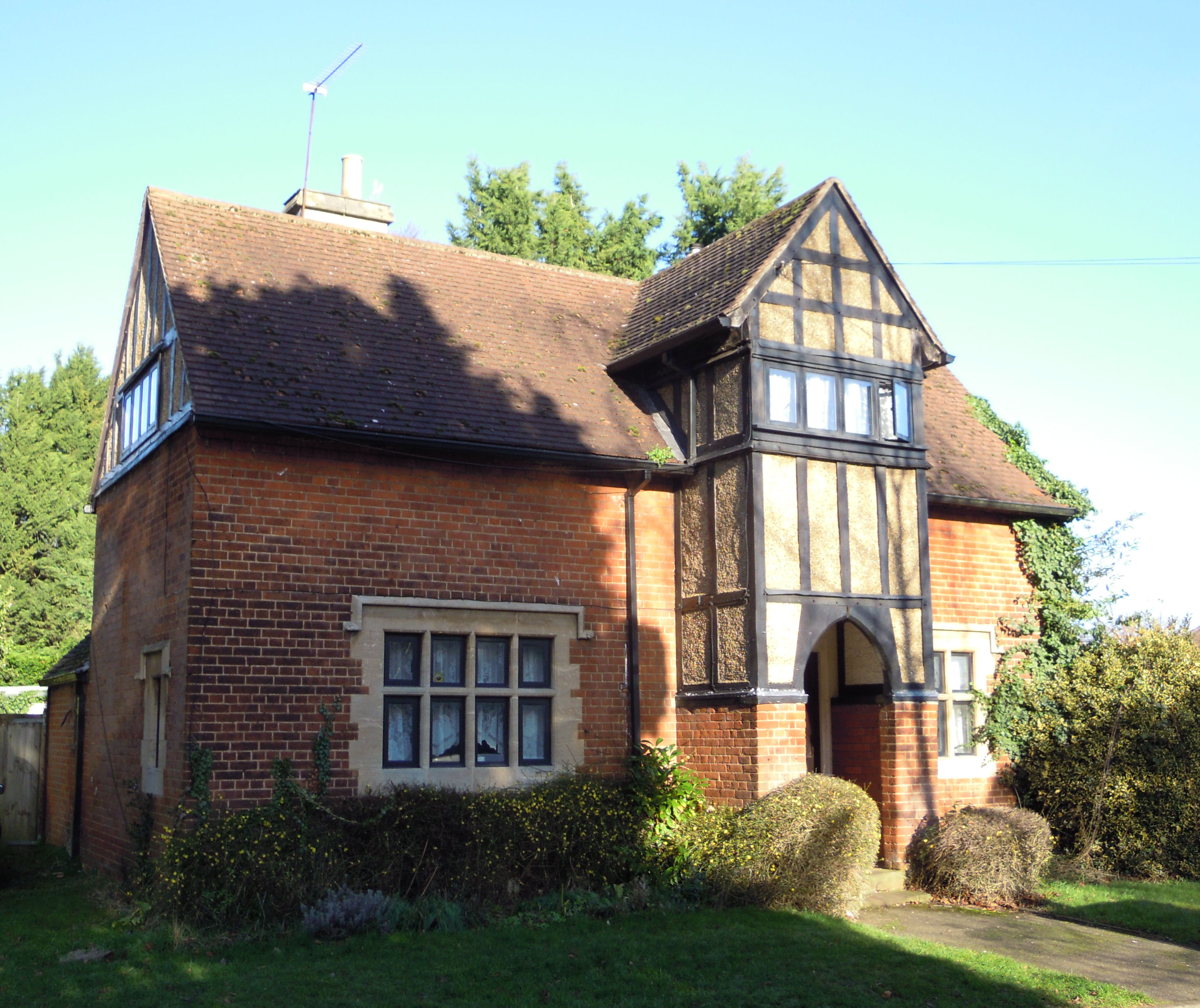
The cemetery Lodge

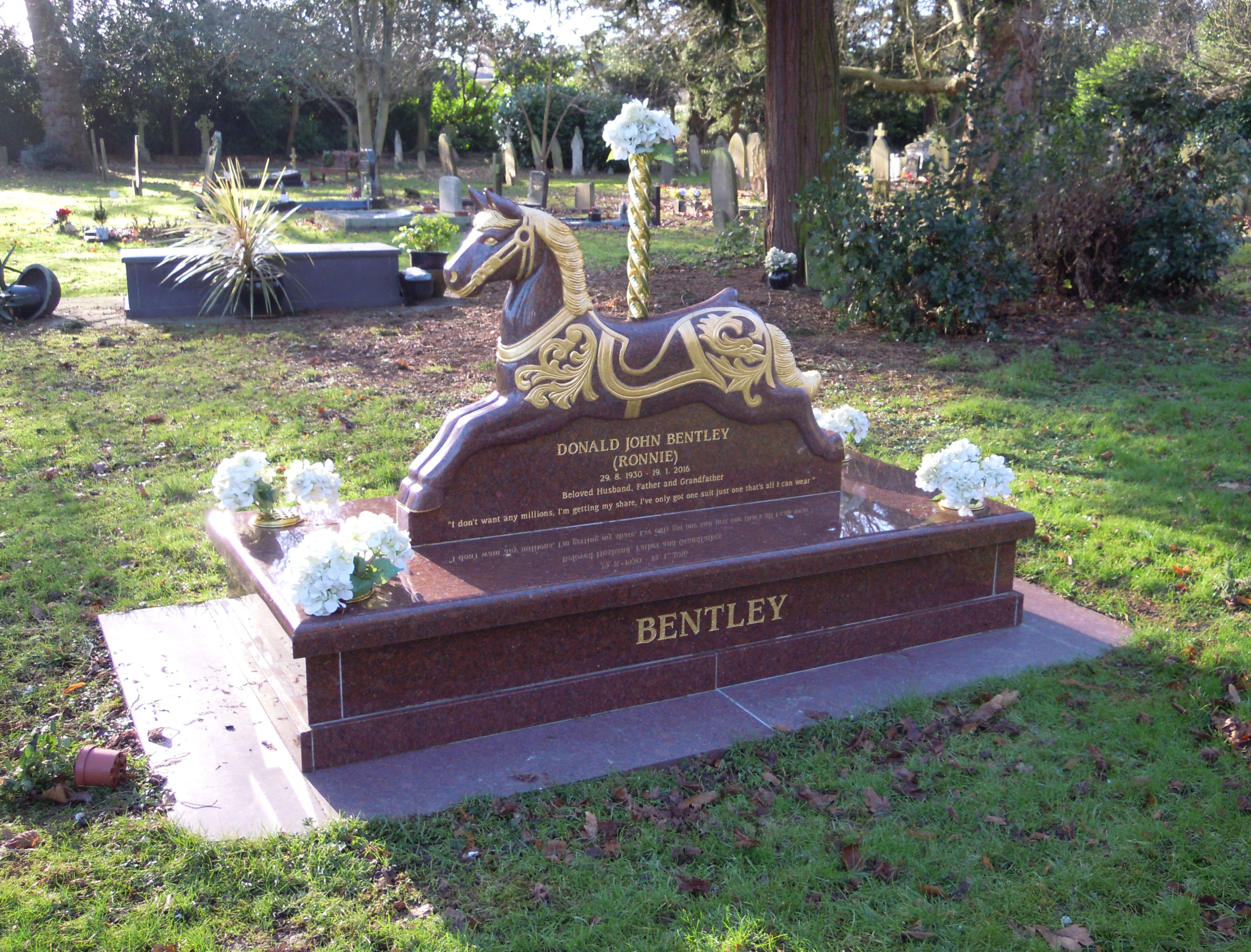
The unusual Bentley grave
