= Hard Hearted Hannah (The Vamp of Savannah) =

1924 popular song

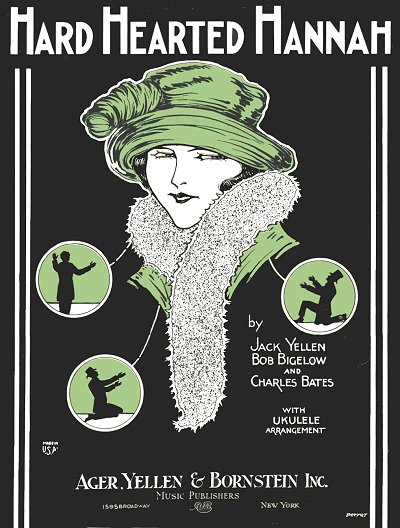
Sheet music cover, 1924

"Hard Hearted Hannah, the Vamp of Savannah" is a popular song with words by Jack Yellen, Bob Bigelow, and Charles Bates, and music by Milton Ager. The song was published in June 1924 by Ager, Yellen & Bornstein, Inc., New York. "Hard Hearted Hannah" tells in humorous fashion the story of a sadistic "vamp" or femme fatale from Savannah, Georgia.

Popularized by vocalist Margaret Young, it also had early recordings by vocalists Lucille Hegamin and Dolly Kay, Vernon Dalhart in 1924, Herb Wiedoeft's band (1924) and by Paul Whiteman and His Orchestra. A quarter century later Peggy Lee revived the song successfully for Capitol Records, and the Ray Charles Singers recorded a hit version for Decca.

The song has been recorded numerous times by such performers as Patti Austin, Belle Baker, Jim Croce, Bobby Darin, Cliff "Ukulele Ike" Edwards, Ella Fitzgerald, Sue Keller, Stacey Kent, Julie London, Turk Murphy, The Nitty Gritty Dirt Band, Nancy Sinatra, Kay Starr, Pat Suzuki, The Temperance Seven, Toni Tennille, Mary Testa, Sophie Tucker, Margaret Whiting and Sun Ra.

Dolly Kay's version of Hard Hearted Hannah, released in 1924

Notable television or film performances of the song include those by Carol Burnett, Peggy Lee, Dorothy Loudon, Ella Fitzgerald (on Pete Kelly's Blues), and Bea Arthur on Maude and The Golden Girls. The song was performed by vampire Bill Compton (played by Stephen Moyer) in the sixth episode of the second season of the HBO series True Blood, also called "Hard-Hearted Hannah"; Dolly Kay's recording of the song plays over the final credits.

In season 1 of American Idol, contestant Nikki McKibbin sang this song in the finals, in which she ended up in the Bottom 3.

== References in popular culture ==
The song gave its name to a jazz club in Savannah, Georgia, located above Pirates' House and frequented by musician Emma Kelly. Kelly was nicknamed the "Lady of 6,000 Songs" by Savannah native Johnny Mercer.

== See also ==
- List of 1920s jazz standards
