= Dolly Kay =

American singer

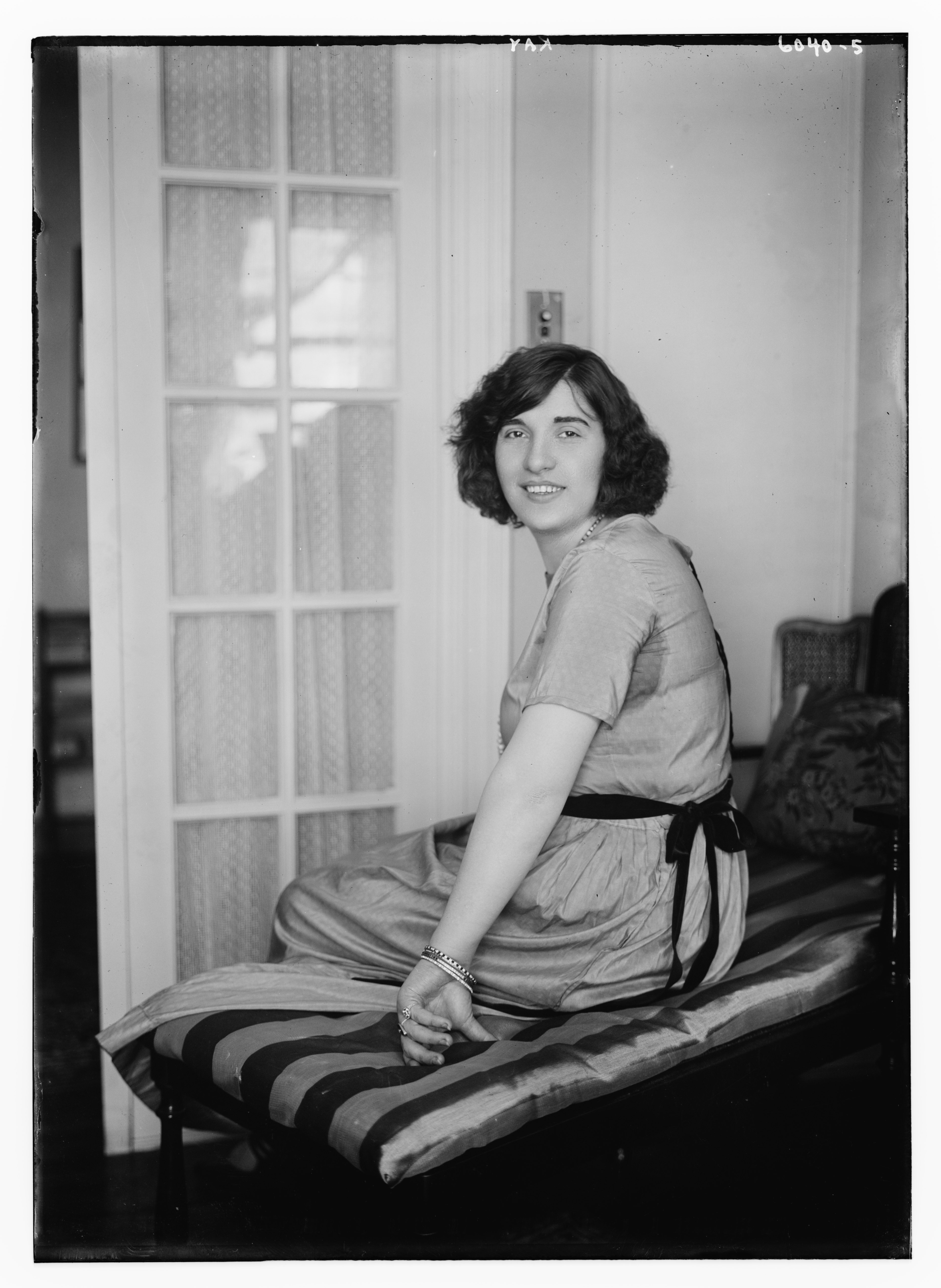
Dolly Kay

Dolly Kay (12 June 1900? – 26 August 1982) was an American vaudeville singer who recorded in the 1920s and was one of the first white singers to incorporate blues songs into her repertoire, most notably "Hard-Hearted Hannah".

== Biography ==
Details of her life are obscure. She was probably born Dora Kirschenbaum in New York City in 1900. She lived with her parents in Westchester, New York, and worked as a stenographer. According to a Los Angeles Times article in 1923, she was so inspired by seeing a vaudeville performance a few years previously that she introduced herself to an agent, who auditioned her and immediately hired her. She began performing as a singer on the Orpheum Circuit, with pianist Phil Phillips, who remained her accompanist for at least the next twenty years.

She was described by one reviewer as "one of the better hot type vocalists... a distinctive singer of her day". She recorded for Columbia Records between 1921 and 1924. Her first recording, "Cry Baby Blues", was made in New York in October 1921, and the following year she had commercial success with "You've Got To See Mama Ev'ry Night (Or You Can't See Mama At All)", which she recorded with Frank Westphal and his Orchestra. Her biggest success came with "Hard-Hearted Hannah", which she was one of the first singers to record, in 1924. She also recorded several other blues songs from Tin Pan Alley songwriters, including "Wabash Blues" (1921), "Sweet Man O' Mine" (1922) and "It Takes A Good Woman (To Keep A Good Man At Home)" (1926). Her later recordings were released on the Harmony label — a subsidiary of Columbia — and finally, in 1928, by Vocalion Records. She also used the pseudonyms Margaret White to record for Lincoln Records, and Sally Freeman on Harmony, and recorded as a member of two vocal groups, the University Six and the Georgians, led by trumpeter Frank Guarente.

She continued to perform in vaudeville and cabaret, in Chicago and elsewhere, in the 1930s and 1940s. In 1942, Billboard reported of a performance in Chicago that she was "long a favorite in local spots... Dolly Kay (with Phil Phillips at the piano) is of the old stock and sells tunes with the force of a veteran...". Her last known performance was in Los Angeles in 1965, when she appeared in a variety show to honor the 40-year career of theatre and movie star Fifi D'Orsay. She died in Los Angeles in 1982, at which time she was also known as Dolly Riccio.
