= The Performance =

Studio album by Shirley Bassey
- Released: 9 November 2009
- Recorded: 2009
- Genre: Pop
- Length: 42:11
- Label: Geffen
- Producer: David Arnold

Shirley Bassey chronology
Get the Party Started (2007)	The Performance (2009)	Hello Like Before (2014)

Professional ratings
Review scores
Source	Rating
AllMusic	3.5/5 stars
BBC Music	favourable
Daily Telegraph	3/5 stars
The Observer	4/5 stars
The Scotsman	4/5 stars
The Times	4/5 stars

The Performance is an album by the Welsh singer Shirley Bassey, released on 9 November 2009. It is her first studio album of original compositions in three decades. The album was executive produced by music executive Paul Carey. English film composer David Arnold co-produced the entire album with Mike Dixon. Songs on the album were written specifically for Bassey by renowned writers such as Rufus Wainwright, Gary Barlow, and Pet Shop Boys. The recording of the album became the subject of a BBC documentary titled The Girl from Tiger Bay named after the song written for the project by James Dean Bradfield and Nicky Wire of Manic Street Preachers. The album gained favourable reviews and was certified gold in the UK for sales of over 100,000 copies.

== Background ==
Music Executive Paul Carey came up with the concept for The Performance. He approached music producer David Arnold about the album project who had recently produced music scores for the James Bond franchise. Having entered semi-retirement and not having toured for a few years, Bassey was unsure about recording again until she heard that a number of famous songwriters were keen to contribute to the album. With artists such as Manic Street Preachers, Gary Barlow, Nick Hodgson (the then-drummer and backing vocalist of the Kaiser Chiefs), and the Pet Shop Boys involved, Bassey felt honoured by the contributions and agreed to do the album. The first song ready for the album was the Rufus Wainwright composition, "Apartment". The recording took place during 2009 with the orchestral arrangements taking place sometime before the vocals were laid down - a process Bassey was unfamiliar with. The vocal sessions took place in Grouse Lodge Studios, Westmeath, Ireland.

Bassey commented that the songs were very different from anything she had recorded before, with songs such as "After the Rain" being in a much lower-key than she would normally use, while the Arnold composition "As God Is My Witness" was almost scrapped due to a disagreement about the arrangement. Gary Barlow said that he had struggled to complete his song, "This Time", and as Bassey found it lyrically too long, some sections were abandoned. Barlow came into the studio to play it to them, having been unable to record a demo in time. The only female writer, KT Tunstall revealed that her song "Nice Men" was originally titled "Nice Boys", but thought that a 72-year-old woman referring to 'boys' was perhaps distasteful. Of the Pet Shop Boys composition, "The Performance of My Life", Bassey remarked that the lyrics hit close to home and moved her to tears during recording. Songwriter Neil Tennant said that it was about a diva, who lived her life on stage but was not specifically about Bassey. At the end of the recording, Bassey said that the experience was both "frustrating, but exhilarating". Also of note is the song "Our Time is Now," a collaborative effort between veteran Bond composer and long-time Bassey collaborator John Barry and lyricist Don Black, with the duo having previously penned the Bond theme song "Diamonds Are Forever" for her in 1971. Of the finished album, she was said to be "ecstatic".

No singles were released from the album, although separate sources named both "Apartment" and "This Time" as the first release. Ultimately, neither was made available. The album spent 8 weeks on the UK albums chart, peaking at No. 20. The album was certified gold by the BPI for sales of over 100,000 copies in the UK indicating that while it did not chart as highly as her previous album Get the Party Started, it ultimately outsold it.

== Track listing ==
The Performance track listing
No.	Title	Writer(s)	Length
1.	"Almost There"	Tom Baxter	4:52
2.	"Apartment"	Rufus Wainwright	3:29
3.	"This Time"	Gary Barlow	4:10
4.	"I Love You Now"	Nick Hodgson	3:45
5.	"Our Time Is Now"	John Barry, Don Black	3:10
6.	"As God Is My Witness"	David Arnold, David McAlmont	4:33
7.	"No Good About Goodbye"	Arnold, Don Black	4:21
8.	"The Girl from Tiger Bay"	Manic Street Preachers, Arnold	4:17
9.	"Nice Men"	KT Tunstall	2:53
10.	"After the Rain"	Richard Hawley	3:05
11.	"The Performance of My Life"	Neil Tennant, Chris Lowe	3:33

== Charts ==
=== Weekly charts ===
Weekly chart performance for The Performance
Chart (2009)	Peak position
German Albums (Offizielle Top 100)	81
Greek Albums (IFPI)	37
Irish Albums (IRMA)	91
Scottish Albums (OCC)	20
UK Albums (OCC)	20

=== Year-end charts ===
Year-end chart performance for The Performance
Chart (2009)	Position
UK Albums (OCC)	96
