= Born to Sing the Blues =

Studio album by Shirley Bassey
- Released: 1958
- Recorded: 1956–1957
- Genre: Blues
- Label: Philips
- Producer: John Franz

Shirley Bassey chronology
Born to Sing the Blues (1958)	The Bewitching Miss Bassey (1959)

Born to Sing the Blues is the debut album by Welsh singer Shirley Bassey. It was released on a 10" LP in 1958 by the Philips Records label. Long-playing records were newly introduced in the mid-1950s and the 10" album was briefly introduced as an album format, shortly before the 12" format became the standard long playing format.

Shirley Bassey had been signed, a year earlier, to Philips by Johnny Franz and had released three singles which failed to chart, including her debut recording "Burn My Candle (At Both Ends)". But 1957 would bring her first chart success with the top ten hit "The Banana Boat Song". Philips were not certain to which market Shirley Bassey should be directed. They had recorded her singing Great American Songbook standards, novelty songs and even the blues. The opening track from the album, the only one previously released, is the title song "Born to Sing the Blues". This track was one of the three singles issued in 1956, as the B-side of "The Wayward Wind". After a successful live performance of the song on British television, John Franz decided to present her in an album of traditional blues songs. Several of the compositions that appeared on the album were written by W.C. Handy, known as "Father of the Blues".

The recordings appear here in mono, no stereo versions are known to exist. In the 1970s Philips did re-issue them in an "electronically enhanced" stereo (also known as "pseudo-stereo"), but these added echoes proved unpopular, and these versions have not been re-released. For many years the recordings made by Bassey at Philips were not generally available on CD. Since the late 2000s they have fallen into the public domain and in the past few years, several compilations have been released on CD. The most comprehensive is Burn My Candle - The Complete Early Years 1956-58 from Fantastic Voyage Music released in 2009.

== Track listing ==
Side One.

1. "Born to Sing the Blues" (Lenny Adelson, Imogen Carpenter) - 2.47
2. "Beale Street Blues" (W.C. Handy) - 3.04
3. "Wabash Blues" (Fred Meinken, Dave Ringle) - 2.30
4. "Basin Street Blues" (Spencer Williams) - 2.37

Side Two.

1. "The Birth of the Blues" (Ray Henderson, Buddy G. DeSylva, Lew Brown) - 4.05
2. "Careless Love Blues" (Traditional) (W.C. Handy, Spencer Williams, Martha E. Koenig) - 2.37
3. "Blues in the Night (My Mama Done Told Me)" (Harold Arlen, Johnny Mercer) - 3.56
4. "The St. Louis Blues" (W.C. Handy) - 3.33

== Personnel ==
- Shirley Bassey – vocal
- Wally Stott and his Orchestra – arranger, conductor
