= How About You? =

Song
- Released: 1941
- Composer: Burton Lane
- Lyricist: Ralph Freed

"How About You?" is a popular song composed by Burton Lane, with lyrics by Ralph Freed. It was introduced in the 1941 film Babes on Broadway by Judy Garland and Mickey Rooney.

The lyrics of the song are often changed depending on the recording artist. In its original form it is a humorous romantic duet, though rarely recorded that way. Certain lyrics, especially those with topical references, are often changed based on the time of the performance's release. For example, the line "Franklin Roosevelt's looks give me a thrill" was changed to "James Durante's looks" in a 1956 recording by Sinatra, though he did sing it in its original form when he recorded it with Tommy Dorsey in December 1941. Another example can be found in Bobby Darin's version of the song, which replaces the Roosevelt reference with a reference to "Mr. Kennedy." Darin's version changes the lyrics again near the end of the song to "Mrs. Darin," who at the time was American actress Sandra Dee. Similarly, in a shout-out to his wife on a 1964 recording, Steve Lawrence sings, "Eydie Gormé’s looks give me a thrill."

Bob Crosby, Mary Livingstone and Jack Benny sang the song as a novelty trio on a 1955 episode of Benny's TV show.

Lucille Ball and Van Johnson sang and danced to this song on an episode of I Love Lucy.

== Notable recordings ==
- 1941 Judy Garland
- 1956 Frank Sinatra - Songs for Swingin' Lovers! and The Legendary Sides (1997) with Tommy Dorsey
- 1958 Bing Crosby and Rosemary Clooney - Fancy Meeting You Here with Billy May
- 1959 Shirley Bassey on her The Bewitching Miss Bassey
- 1959 Joni James - Joni Sings Sweet
- 1961 Bobby Darin - Love Swings
- 1964 Steve Lawrence - Academy Award Losers.

== Other film appearances ==
- The song was also featured in The Fisher King with Robin Williams (when it was sung and whistled by Harry Nilsson).
- Richard Dreyfuss hums and sings part of the song in The Goodbye Girl.
- Mammy Two Shoes hums and sings part of the song in 1943 Tom and Jerry cartoon, The Lonesome Mouse.
- Eve Marley sings it, dubbing for Anne Bancroft, in Don't Bother to Knock (1952).
- The music of the song appears in the films All About Eve (1950) (it is played on the piano at the party while the guests are gathered on the stairs) and in Bachelor in Paradise (1961).
- Denea Wilde sings this song in a key, memorable scene of the original 1971 version of the film Get Carter.
