= The Living Tree (song) =

Single by Shirley Bassey

from the album Get the Party Started
- Released: 27 April 2007
- Recorded: 2006
- Genre: Pop, vocal
- Length: 5:00
- Label: Lock Stock and Barrel
- Songwriter(s): Catherine Feeney, Nikki Lamborn
- Producer(s): Catherine Feeney, Nikki Lamborn, Bob Kraushaar

Shirley Bassey singles chronology
"That's What Friends Are For" (2005)	"The Living Tree" (2007)	"Get the Party Started" (2007)

"The Living Tree" was written by Catherine Feeney and Nikki Lamborn of the band Never the Bride, who recorded the song for their 2002 album Surprise. It was a Top 40 hit for Shirley Bassey in 2007. Feeney and Lamborn invited Bassey to record the song; they had left a copy of their recording at her gym in Monaco with a note saying they knew it was a song for her.

In 2005, Bassey topped the bill in her home town of Cardiff at the Royal Variety Performance and premiered her version of "The Living Tree". The song was frequently performed live in 2006 and included in the set of the 2006 UK tour. In early 2007, she made an appearance on the British TV show The Dame Edna Treatment and performed "The Living Tree" and a comic duet version of "Big Spender" with Dame Edna Everage.

The CD single included seven versions of the song and CD-ROM tracks of the video. The first video track is taken from her live performance at the 2006 Faenol Festival in North Wales, features Bassey introducing the song. The video, on track 9, uses animation interwoven with a live performance of the track during this concert. The video was directed by Oliver Moss and produced by Andrew Brassington. The single was released worldwide as a digital download, on 7 May 2007, on the iTunes Stores. The single peaked at #37 on the UK Singles Chart, making a record for Bassey of being the only artist to be active in the UK singles charts for more than 50 years.

The song was released on the 2007 studio album Get the Party Started.

== Track listing ==
1. "The Living Tree" (Radio edit) – 3:49
2. "The Living Tree" – 5:00
3. "The Living Tree" (Shaken and Stirred mix) – 3:28
4. "The Living Tree" (Stuart Critchon mix) – 3:49
5. "The Living Tree" (Superbass Vocal mix) – 4:03
6. "The Living Tree" (Shaken and Stirred Club mix) – 7:23
7. "The Living Tree" (Superbass Extended Vocal mix) – 5:14
8. "The Living Tree" (Video spoken intro) – 1:16
9. "The Living Tree" (Music video) – 5:00

== Personnel ==
- Shirley Bassey - Vocal
- Lynton Naiff - Arranger (strings)
- Clem Cleson - Guitar
- David Levy - Bass
- Tony Kiley - Drums
- Catherine Feeney, Nikki Lamborn - Backing vocals
