= Presenting Lena Zavaroni =

Studio album by Lena Zavaroni
- Released: 1977
- Genre: Pop
- Label: Galaxy Records (UK, 1977)

Lena Zavaroni chronology
Lena Zavaroni in South Africa (1975)	Presenting Lena Zavaroni (1977)	Songs Are Such Good Things (1978)

Presenting Lena Zavaroni is the fourth album by Scottish singer Lena Zavaroni, released in 1977 by Galaxy Records.

== Track listing ==
1. "Whole World in His Hands"
2. "Won't Somebody Dance With Me" (De Paul)
3. "Napony"
4. "As Usual"
5. "Rose, Rose"
6. "Mama Tambu's Wedding"
7. "Speak to Me Pretty"
8. "If It Wasn't For You Dear"
9. "Air Love"
10. "Can't We Make It Go Away"
11. "Say, Has Anybody Seen My Sweet Gypsy Rose" (Levine/Brown)
12. "Pinch Me Am I Dreaming"

== Personnel ==
- Lena Zavaroni – vocals
