= And We Were Lovers =

Studio album by Shirley Bassey
- Released: 1967
- Genre: Vocal
- Label: United Artists
- Producer: Kenneth Hume, Norman Newell

Shirley Bassey chronology
I've Got a Song for You (1966)	And We Were Lovers (1967)	12 of Those Songs (1968)

Big Spender
- 1971 re-issue

And We Were Lovers is a 1967 studio album by Shirley Bassey. The album featured Bassey's first recording of "Big Spender', the single subsequently hit #21 on the charts.

And We Were Lovers was recorded in America and in England. The American release replaced "On a Clear Day You Can See Forever" with "Walking Happy", which was not available in the UK until the release of a compilation album The Shirley Bassey Collection II in the mid-1970s. A different version of "Big Spender", produced by Kenneth Hume and arranged by Marty Paich, also appeared only on the US issue. These two recordings are included as bonus tracks on a 2005 BGO Records release that has a remastered And We Were Lovers and I've Got a Song for You on a single CD in stereo.

== Track listing ==
Side One.

1. "And We Were Lovers" (Jerry Goldsmith, Leslie Bricusse)
2. "Summer Wind" (Hans Bradtke, Henry Mayer, Johnny Mercer)
3. "Somebody Like Me" (Wayne Carson Thompson)
4. "It Must Be Him" (Seul Sur Son Étoile) (Gilbert Bécaud, Maurice Vidalin, Mack David)
5. "Big Spender" (Dorothy Fields, Cy Coleman)

Side Two.

1. "The Impossible Dream" (Mitch Leigh, Joe Darion)
2. "Dommage, Dommage" (Too Bad, Too Bad) (Paul Vance, Lee Pockriss)
3. "On a Clear Day You Can See Forever" (Alan Jay Lerner, Burton Lane)
4. "If You Go Away" (Ne Me Quitte Pas) (Rod McKuen, Jacques Brel)
5. "That's Life" (Dean Kay, Kelly Gordon)

== Personnel ==
- Shirley Bassey – vocal
- Marty Paich – arranger, conductor (tracks 1, 3, 4, 7, 9, 10)
- Ernie Freeman – arranger, conductor (tracks 2, 5, 6, 8)
