= Ma! (He's Making Eyes at Me) =

Studio album by Lena Zavaroni
- Released: 1974
- Genre: Pop
- Labels: {{ubl|Philips Records (UK, 1974)|Stax Records (US, 1974)
- Producer: Tommy Scott

Lena Zavaroni chronology
| Ma! (He's Making Eyes at Me) (1974) | If My Friends Could See Me Now (1974) |

Ma! (He's Making Eyes at Me) is the debut album by Scottish singer Lena Zavaroni, released in 1974 on Philips Records. The record was a hit and made Zavaroni the youngest artist to have a record in the Top 10 UK albums chart, a distinction she still holds.

== Track listing ==
1. "Ma! (He's Making Eyes at Me)" (Con Conrad, Sidney Clare) (Note: Tom Parker)
2. "The End of the World" (Sylvia Dee, Arthur Kent) (Note: Arthur Greenslade)
3. "Swinging on a Star" (Johnny Burke, Jimmy Van Heusen)
4. "Help Me Make It Through the Night" (Kris Kristofferson)
5. "Cross My Heart" (Scott)
6. "My Mammy" (Walter Donaldson, Sam M. Lewis, Joe Young) (Note: Bob Sharples)
7. "Rock-A-Bye Your Baby (with a Dixie Melody)" (Sam M. Lewis, Joe Young, Jean Schwartz)
8. "Country Roads" (John Denver)
9. "Pennies from Heaven" (Arthur Johnstone)
10. "Love Can Make the World Go Around" (Scott)
11. "My Happiness" (Borney Bergantine, Betty Peterson)
12. "River Deep Mountain High" (Phil Spector, Ellie Greenwich, Jeff Barry)

== Personnel ==
- Lena Zavaroni – vocals

=== Additional personnel ===
Arrangements:

- Album produced by Tommy Scott for Ashtree Holdings Ltd.

== Chart positions ==
| Year | Country | Position | References |
|---|---|---|---|
| 1974 | United Kingdom | 8 | |
