= Lena Zavaroni =

Scottish singer (1963–1999)

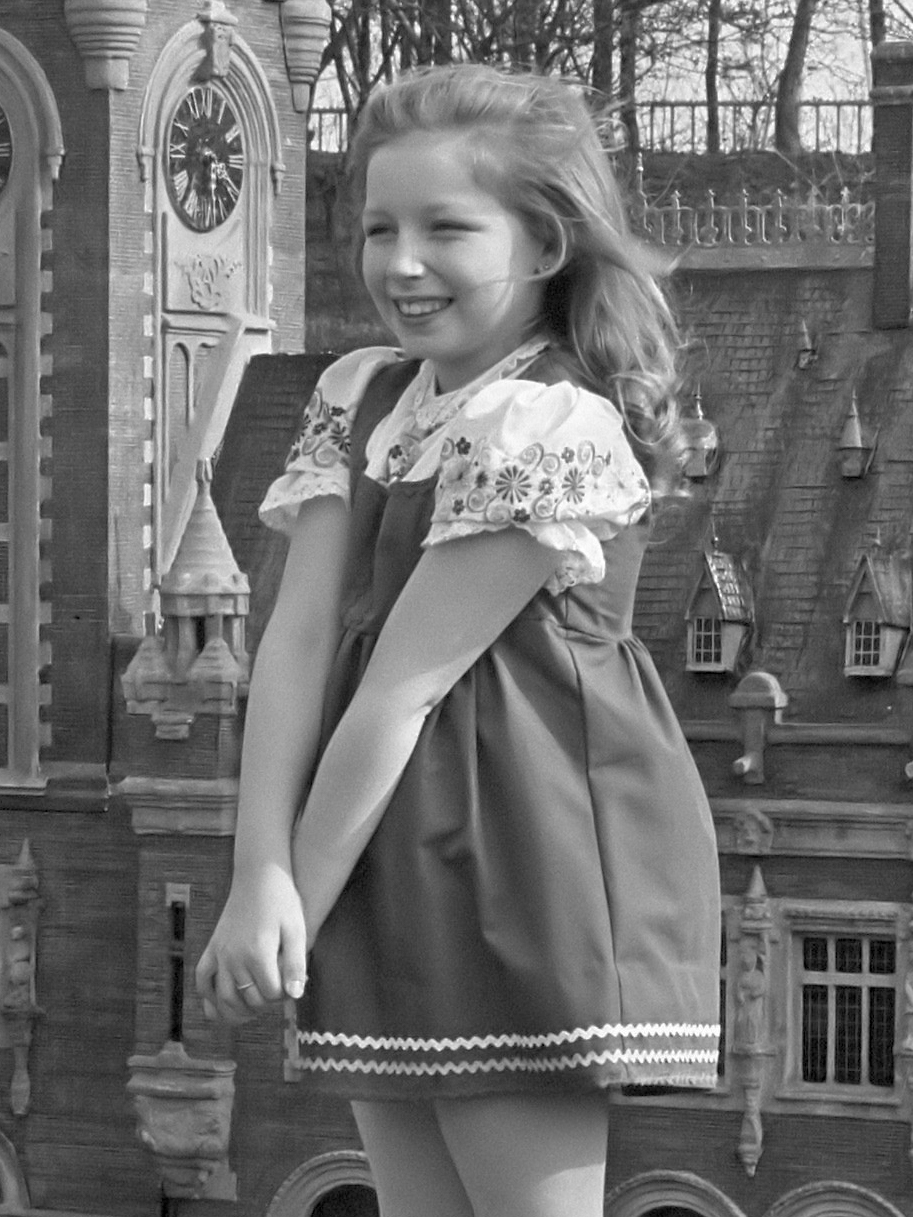
- Lena Zavaroni at the age of 10 in 1974, standing in front of a miniature of the Peace Palace in Madurodam

Background information
- Born: Lena Hilda Zavaroni; 4 November 1963; Greenock, Renfrewshire, Scotland
- Origin: Rothesay, Isle of Bute, Scotland
- Died: 1 October 1999 (aged 35) Heath, Cardiff, Wales
- Genres: Pop; soul; R&B; jazz; prog rock
- Occupation: Singer
- Years active: 1974–1993
- Labels: Stax; WDR; E.G.; IOM; BBC

Lena Hilda Zavaroni (4 November 1963 – 1 October 1999) was a Scottish singer. At the age of 10, with her debut album Ma! (He's Making Eyes at Me), she was the youngest person to have had an album in the top 10 of the UK Albums Chart. Later, she starred in her own television series, made numerous TV guest-star appearances, and appeared on stage.

From age 13 Zavaroni suffered anorexia nervosa, and she developed clinical depression when she was 15. Following an operation to cure her depression, Zavaroni died at the age of 35 from pneumonia on 1 October 1999.

== Life and career ==
=== Early life ===
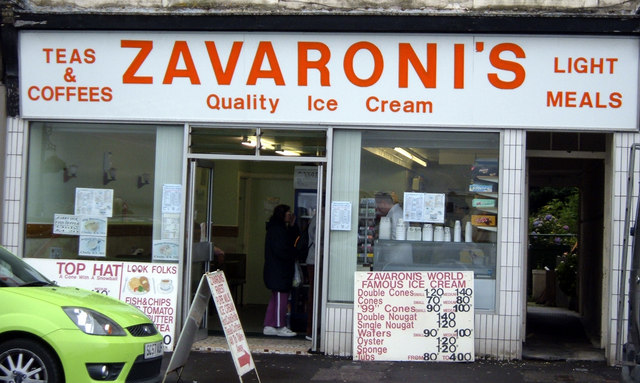
The family business in Rothesay, Zavaroni's Cafe

Zavaroni was born in Greenock, Renfrewshire, and grew up in the small town of Rothesay on the Isle of Bute. Her parents owned a fish and chip shop. Her father Victor (b. 1939) played the guitar and her mother Hilda (née Jordan) (c. 1940 – 1989) sang. Her grandfather Alfredo had emigrated from Italy.

Zavaroni began singing at the age of two. She was discovered in the summer of 1973 by record producer Tommy Scott, who was on holiday in Rothesay and heard her singing in a band with her father and uncle. Scott contacted impresario Phil Solomon, which led to his partner Dorothy Solomon becoming Zavaroni's manager.

=== Musical career ===
In 1974, Zavaroni appeared on Opportunity Knocks (hosted by Hughie Green) and won the show for a record-breaking five weeks running. She followed this with the album Ma! (He's Making Eyes at Me), a collection of classic and then-recent pop standards which reached number 8 in the UK Albums Chart. She remains the youngest person to have an album in the top 10, having reached the position at 10 years, 146 days old.

Zavaroni sang at a Hollywood charity show with Frank Sinatra and Lucille Ball in 1974, at which Ball said: "You're special. Very special and very, very good", although some sources attribute the words to Sinatra. Following this, Zavaroni guest-starred on The Carol Burnett Show, and on 4 June 1974, The Tonight Show. She also appeared on The Morecambe and Wise Show, the 29 May 1975 episode of The Wheeltappers and Shunters Social Club, in the 1976 Royal Variety Show and performed at the White House for U.S. President Gerald Ford. Signed to the soul-oriented Stax Records label in the United States, Zavaroni was not especially successful in America despite the praise and television appearances; her Ma album did not enter the charts, and its title single only reached number 91 on the Billboard Hot 100 during a four-week chart run in the summer of 1974.

=== Stage and television career ===
While attending London's Italia Conti Academy stage school, Zavaroni met and became long-term friends with another young star, Bonnie Langford. They starred in the ITV special Lena and Bonnie. In September 1978, the BBC broadcast Lena Zavaroni on Broadway. This episode which was chosen for the 1978 Golden Sea Swallow Festival, where it won the silver award.

In 1979, Zavaroni had her own TV series on the BBC titled Lena Zavaroni and Music and from 1980 to 1982 she had a TV series titled Lena.

=== Later years ===
From the age of 13, Zavaroni suffered from anorexia nervosa. While she was at stage school, her weight dropped to four stone (25 kg; 56 lb). She blamed this on the pressure placed upon her to fit into costumes while at the same time "developing as a woman". She continued to have anorexia throughout the 1980s.

In 1989, Zavaroni married computer consultant Peter Wiltshire. The couple settled in north London but separated 18 months later. The same year, Zavaroni's mother Hilda died of a tranquilliser overdose, and a fire destroyed all of her show business mementos.

After the breakup of her marriage, Zavaroni moved to Hoddesdon, Hertfordshire, to be nearer to her father and his second wife. By this time, she was living on state benefits and, in 1999, was accused of stealing a 50p packet of jelly, but the charges were later dropped.

=== Health issues and death ===
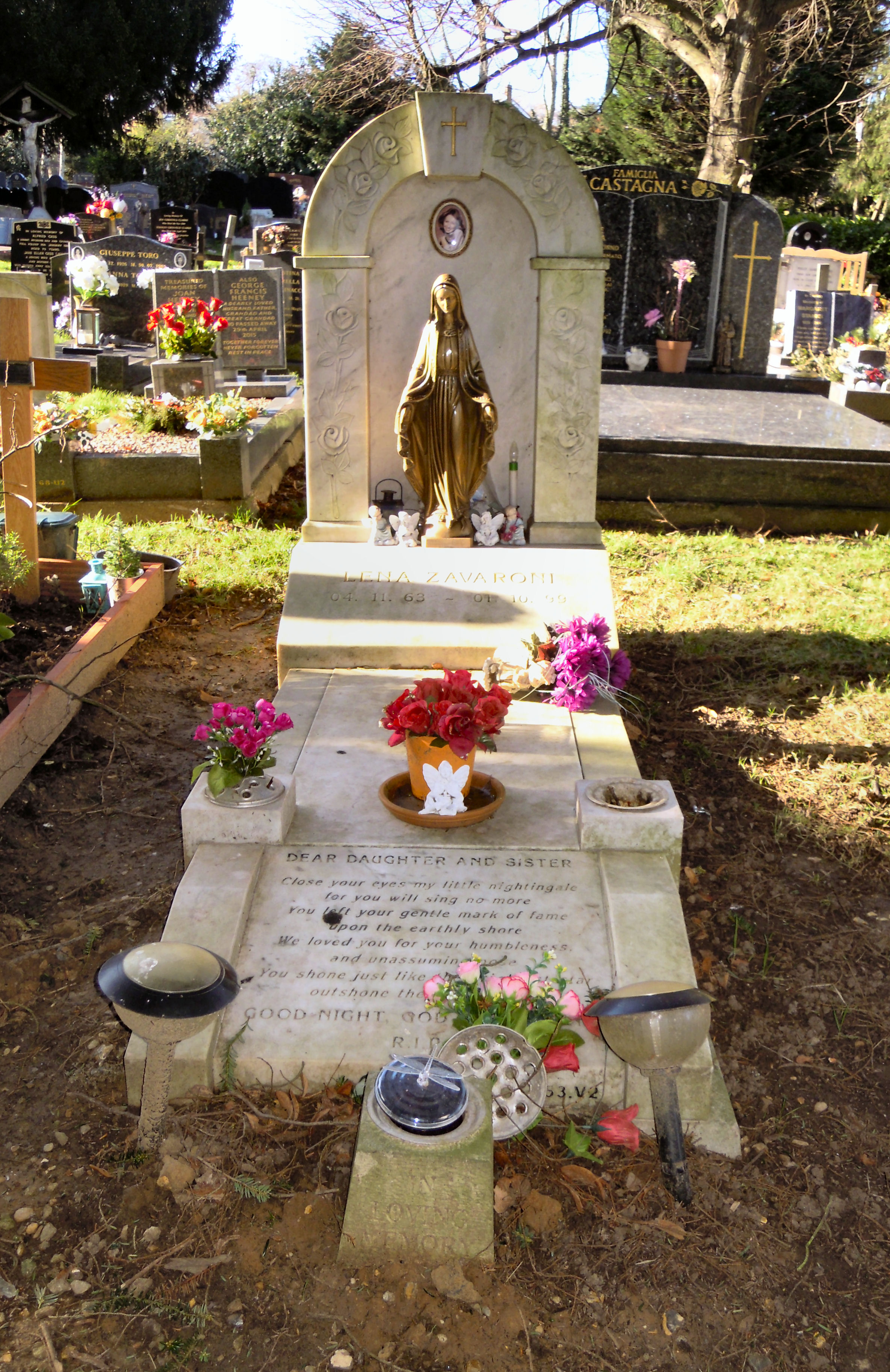
Lena Zavaroni's grave in Hoddesdon Cemetery in 2018

Zavaroni underwent drug treatments and received electroconvulsive therapy in an attempt to end her depression. She begged doctors to carry out neurosurgery on her to relieve her depression. Although the procedure would not cure her anorexia, she was desperate for it to proceed, threatening suicide if it did not (she also took a drug overdose).

In September 1999, Zavaroni was admitted to University Hospital of Wales in Cardiff for the neurosurgical procedure. It took place on 7 September and was described as "pioneering". After the procedure, she appeared to be in satisfactory condition: after a week, she was "making telephone calls, cheerful and engaging in conversation", even asking her doctor if he thought there was any chance that she would get back on stage and sing again. However, three weeks after the operation, she contracted pneumonia, which saw her weight drop to less than five stone (32 kg; 70 lb). She died from bronchial pneumonia on 1 October.

It was reported that the surgery was a lobotomy (also known as a leucotomy), and the treatment was intended for depression, rather than anorexia, as was rumoured at the time.

Her funeral took place at the Roman Catholic Church of St Augustine in Hoddesdon on 15 October 1999, and she was buried later that day at Hoddesdon Cemetery in Hertfordshire.

== Legacy ==
A BBC Scotland documentary, Lena Zavaroni: The Forgotten Child Star, was first broadcast in September 2024. It aired on BBC Two in December 2024.

== Discography ==
=== Albums ===
- Ma! (He's Making Eyes at Me)
- If My Friends Could See Me Now
- Presenting Lena Zavaroni
- Songs Are Such Good Things
- Lena Zavaroni and Her Music
- Hold Tight, It's Lena

Compilations and live albums

- The Lena Zavaroni Collection – Pickwick released a two-record set in 1976, made up of her first two albums.
- Lena Zavaroni in South Africa

=== Singles ===
Year	Title	Peak chart positions			Album
Year	Title	UK	AUS	US	Album
1974	"Ma! (He's Making Eyes at Me)"	10	90	91	Ma! (He's Making Eyes at Me)
1974	"(You've Got) Personality"	33	-	-	non-album single
1975	"You're Breaking My Heart"	-	-	-	non-album single
1975	"Music Music Music"	-	-	-	If My Friends Could See Me Now
1975	"Smile"	-	-	-	non-album single
1976	"Some of These Days"	-	-	-	non-album single
1977	"Air Love"	-	-	-	Presenting Lena Zavaroni
1978	"I Should've Listened to Mama"	-	-	-	Songs Are Such Good Things
1979	"Somewhere South of Macon"	-	-	-	non-album single
1980	"Jump Down Jimmy"	-	-	-	non-album single
1980	"Will He Kiss Me Tonight?"	-	-	-	non-album single
1981	"Roses and Rainbows"	-	-	-	non-album single
1982	"Hold Tight!"	-	-	-	Hold Tight, It's Lena
