= You Can Have Him =

1949 popular song by Irving Berlin

Song
- Published: 1949
- Songwriter: Irving Berlin

"You Can Have Him" is a popular song written by Irving Berlin for the 1949 musical Miss Liberty, where it was introduced by Allyn McLerie and Mary McCarty.

== Notable recordings ==
- Doris Day & Dinah Shore - recorded May 1, 1949 for Columbia Records (catalog No. 38514).
- Peggy Lee - recorded May 25, 1949 (Capitol Records single 57-670)
- Ella Fitzgerald - Ella Fitzgerald Sings the Irving Berlin Songbook (1958)
- Eydie Gorme - for her album Eydie (1968).
- Nina Simone - included in the album Nina Simone at Town Hall (1959)
- Nancy Wilson - Broadway – My Way (1964)
- Shirley Bassey - for her album I've Got a Song for You (1966)
