= Ma! He's Making Eyes at Me =

Song

Song
- Language: English
- Published: 1921
- Composer: Con Conrad
- Lyricist: Sidney Clare

"Ma! (He's Making Eyes at Me)"

Single by Lena Zavaroni

from the album Ma! (He's Making Eyes at Me)
- B-side: "Rock-a-Bye Your Baby with a Dixie Melody"
- Released: 25 January 1974 (UK); March 1974 (US)
- Genre: Traditional pop
- Length: 2:57
- Label: Philips 6006-367 (UK); Stax STA-0206 (US)
- Songwriters: Con Conrad, Sidney Clare
- Producer: Tommy Scott

Lena Zavaroni singles chronology
| "Ma! (He's Making Eyes at Me)" (1974) | "(You've Got) Personality" (1974) |

"Ma, He's Making Eyes at Me", alternatively sung as "Ma, She's Making Eyes at Me", is a song published in 1921. The lyric is by the American composer and comedian Sidney Clare, and the music by the American songwriter and producer Con Conrad.

== Notable recordings ==
Some of the earliest recordings were by The Benson Orchestra of Chicago and Ted Lewis & His Orchestra, both in 1921. It was also released by Isham Jones Orchestra in November 1921 as the A-side of "Wabash Blues". Later recordings include Dick Robertson & His Orchestra released in December 1939 on Decca Records with the B-side "She Had to Go and Lose It at the Astor". Soon after, the Merry Macs made a recording released in February 1940, again on Decca Records, with the B-side as "Breezin' Along with the Breeze", followed by Riley Puckett in October 1940 on Bluebird Records with "Walking My Baby Back Home" as the B-side.

The Greek-American singer and band leader Johnny Otis had a hit with it, after including it in his album The Greatest Johnny Otis Show featuring Marie Adams on the tune "Ma, He's Making Eyes at Me". The single credited to "Johnny Otis & His Orchestra with Marie Adams & The Three Tons of Joy" was released on Capitol Records, and charted in the UK Singles Chart peaking at number 2 in November and December 1957.

The song became the title track of a similarly titled debut album by child singer Lena Zavaroni, Ma! (He's Making Eyes at Me). Zavaroni's version was also released as a single in the United Kingdom on Philips Records reaching number 10 on the UK Singles Chart in February 1974. Zavaroni, just turning ten, also sang it live on American network television on The Tonight Show hosted by Johnny Carson. The song also reached number 91 on the US Billboard Hot 100. On the New Zealand Listener charts the track reached number 20.

The song has been interpreted by many artists, including Billy Eckstine on The Ed Sullivan Show, January 10, 1965, and with Quincy Jones Orchestra, 1961; Ann-Margret, Tina Arena, Pearl Bailey, Count Basie Orchestra, Eddie Cantor, Carol Channing, Ray Charles, The Ray Conniff Singers, Bing Crosby, Cliff "Ukulele Ike" Edwards, Etta Jones, Oscar Peterson, Annette Funicello, and Al Jolson. Tina Arena recorded it on her album Tiny Tina and Little John, Al Hirt on his album Beauty and the Beard, Connie Francis on her album A New Kind of Connie..., and Yusef Lateef on his album The Three Faces of Yusef Lateef.

== In other languages ==
The song has been translated into a number of languages. It was sung in Finnish as "Mamma, tuo mies minua tuijottaa" by Brita Koivunen. In 1957, it was released in Swedish as "Mamma, en karl har sett på mej" by Lill-Babs, Simon Brehms orkester and in 1962 also in Swedish as "Mamma, vad det är kul med twist" by Inger Berggren, Hans Wahlgrens orkester. In French, René Simard had a hit with "Mama, laisse-moi sortir ce soir" in 1974. The song was also sung in Czech by Jana Robbová with lyrics by Josef Fousek ("Krásný den", 1975).

== Film adaptations ==
Within four years of its publication in 1921, it was used in a 1925 film short, considered an early sound film, titled Theodore Case Sound Test: Gus Visser and His Singing Duck directed by Theodore Case. The film depicts Visser singing the song "Ma! He's Making Eyes at Me" while holding a duck. The duck quacks each time the word "Ma" is said, sounding as if she is saying "Ma". The film was shot on May 12, 1925, in Case's sound studio at his home in Auburn, New York. The film was shown in June 1925 at the Exposition of Progress in Auburn.

The title was also adopted for the 1940 film Ma! He's Making Eyes at Me directed by Harold D. Schuster and screenplay by Charles Grayson and Edmund L. Hartmann based on "Fashions for Sale", a story by Ed Sullivan, and starring Tom Brown in the role of main character Tommy Shaw.
