= Ralph Freed =

Canadian-American television producer and lyricist (1907–1973)

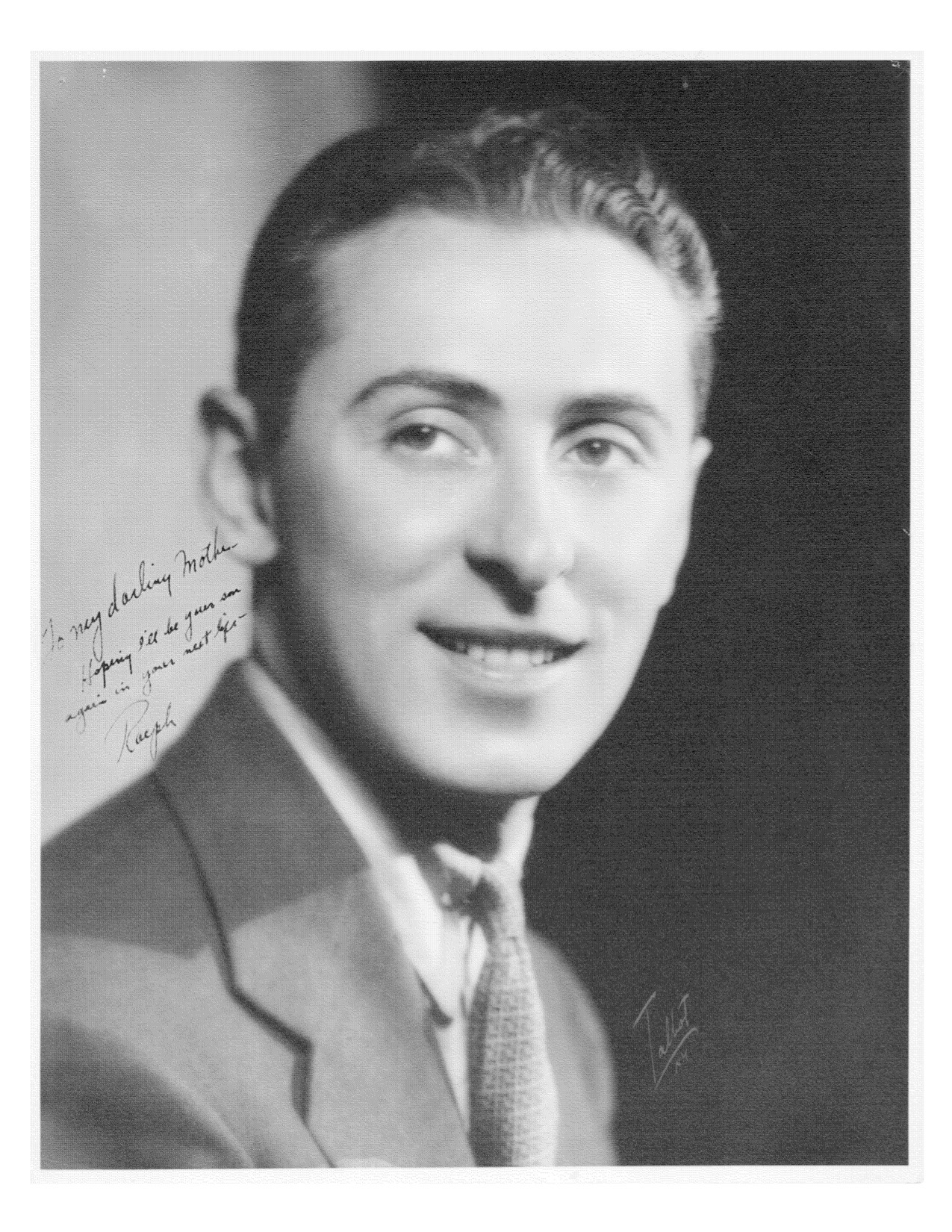
Ralph Freed c 1945

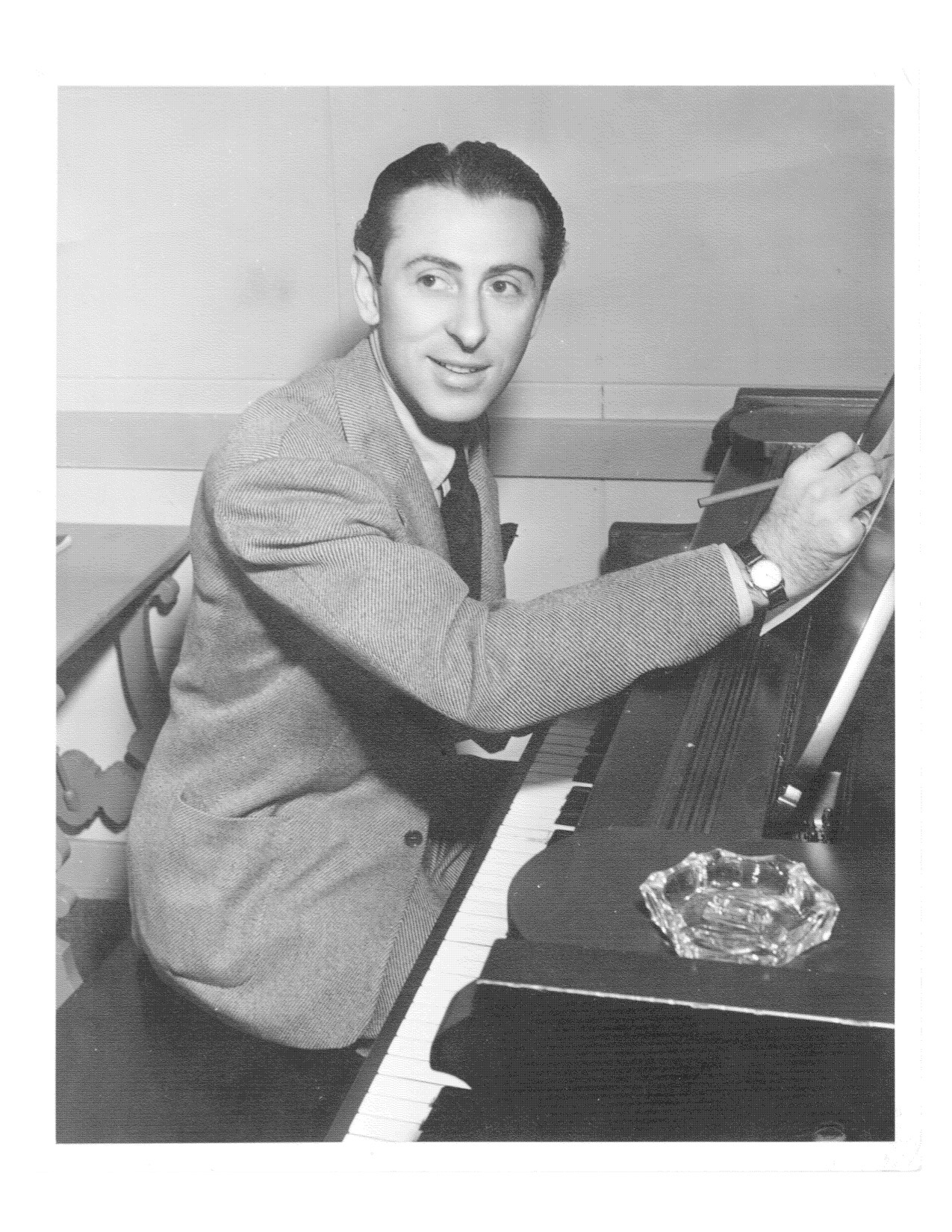
Ralph Freed MGM c 1940s

Ralph Freed (1 May 1907, Vancouver - February 13, 1973) was a Canadian born American lyricist and television producer.

== Early life ==
Born May 1, 1907 to Max Freed and Rosie (Rosza) Grossman who met in Charleston, SC. Ralph married Grace H. Berchman aka Grace Saxon (Saxon Sisters) and had two children.

Freed was the brother of Victor (b 1896), Hugo (b 1897), Sidney (b 1900), Walter (b 1903), Ruth (b 1906), and Clarence (b 1911), and Arthur Freed (b 1894).

== Career ==
Writer and Lyricist, under contract with MGM, Universal, and Paramount during the "Golden Age."

Freed's collaborators included Sammy Fain and Harry Barris. With Burton Lane, Freed wrote "How About You?" for the Judy Garland and Mickey Rooney musical Babes on Broadway. The song received an Academy Award nomination for Best Song at the 15th Academy Awards.

== Notable songs ==
- "How About You?"
- "Little Dutch Mill"
- "Who Walks in When I Walk Out?"
- "Mama Don't Allow It"
- "You Leave Me Breathless"
- "Just the Way You Are"
- "Hawaiian War Chant"
- "Adios Amigo"
- "I Thought of You Last Night"
