= Michael Julien =

British songwriter (1927–2020)

- Born: 1 August 1927
- Died: 29 December 2020 (aged 93)
- Other name: Peter Warne
- Occupations: Composer, lyricist, psychotherapist
- Years active: 1954–2020
- Notable work: "Kiss Me, Honey Honey, Kiss Me" (Shirley Bassey), "Boom Bang-a-Bang" (Lulu)
- Awards: Ivor Novello award

Michael Julien (1 August 1927 – 29 December 2020), also known as Peter Warne, was a British songwriter, who was the co-writer of a number of hit songs around the world.

He wrote the lyrics of "Let's Live for Today", and co-wrote both "Kiss Me, Honey Honey, Kiss Me", and "Boom Bang-a-Bang", a winning song at the Eurovision Song Contest 1969. He received an Ivor Novello Award for songwriting. He also practised as a psychotherapist.

== Early career ==
Julien trained and qualified as a solicitor, but never practised. Instead, he trained and practised as a hypnotherapist, later having a practice in Harley Street.

During his early career, he wrote a song for Norman Wisdom's album Heart of a Clown called "Impossible" in 1954. Julien's first major hit came with "Kiss Me, Honey Honey, Kiss Me", written with Al Timothy, sung by Shirley Bassey in 1958. It proved a great success, peaking in the charts at number three, and staying in the charts for an impressive 17 weeks.

Following his early success as a songwriter, he opened and ran the Club d'Azur in Frith Street, Soho, which became popular with film stars and other celebrities. In 1965, he sold the premises to Ronnie Scott, who moved his existing jazz club to the property.

Julien composed songs for films, including Jazz Boat in 1960. During the sixties, he continued to write songs for established artists such as David Hughes for whom he wrote "Teach me (how to love him)". Julien wrote the English lyrics to Cliff Richard's adaptation of "L'edera", translating as "Constantly". It was a global hit, reaching the top ten in six countries.

Julien's first major hit in the United States came in 1967, when he wrote new English lyrics and title of "Let's Live for Today", from the 1966 Italian-language song "Piangi con Me" ("Cry with Me"), a gold record for The Rokes, co-written by David "Shel" Shapiro of The Rokes and Italian lyricist Mogol. The version using Julien's lyrics and title was first recorded by The Living Daylights, but it was the recording by The Grass Roots that earned its own gold disc and reached #8 on the Billboard Hot 100 singles chart in 1967. This song was voted by troops in the Vietnam War as their favourite song, and is now a pop standard in the US.

== Eurovision success ==
After his success in the United States and with Shirley Bassey, Julien wrote the English lyrics for the Eurovision Song Contest 1968 winning song "La, la, la". Although the Spanish version had the most success, Julien's version reached number seventeen in the Rhodesian charts. The next year, he was invited to write the lyrics for a song for the BBC's national selection process for the Eurovision Song Contest 1969. His song, "Boom Bang-a-Bang" won the United Kingdom's televised selection competition, and represented the nation at the full competition in Madrid. The song placed joint first, with a total of 18 points. It went on to be a hit, peaking at number two in the charts in the UK, in which it remained for 13 weeks. The song also had success in Australia, and in Europe in its foreign language versions.

== Later works ==
Following Eurovision, Julien co-wrote "Love is a Gamble" with Alan Moorhouse, sung by Jackie Lee, marking her debut with her record label Pye Records. He also wrote "Nine Times Out Of Ten", a single for Muriel Day; coincidently, Day had been Ireland's 1969 Eurovision entrant. Subsequently, he composed many other songs that were recorded by American artists.

After retiring as a psychotherapist, Julien did a number of other works. In April 2015, for the first time he released a song as the artist. The track, entitled "You're so Loveable", was released worldwide on iTunes and other major distributors. He did a one-off concert at The Pheasantry, Chelsea to showcase his songs, in association with Test of Time Productions. The show featured Rhiannon Drake and Richard Beavis, amongst others. On 1 October, he appeared on The Chris Evans Breakfast Show talking about his career and Eurovision.

== Personal life and death ==
Julien served in the military and received a commendation for bravery after suffering severe burns in a tank blast. He lived in Essex before moving to Shenley, Hertfordshire, in the early 2000s.

Julien died on 29 December 2020, at the age of 93, after catching COVID-19 whilst in hospital.

== Awards and accolades ==
Year	Award	Result
	Ivor Novello	Won
1969	Eurovision Song Contest	Won
