= Get the Party Started (album) =

2007 album by Shirley Bassey

Studio album / Remix album by Shirley Bassey
- Released: 25 June 2007
- Recorded: 1984–2007
- Genre: Pop, vocal
- Length: 58:53
- Label: Lock Stock and Barrel
- Producer: Catherine Feeney, Nikki Lamborn

Shirley Bassey chronology
Thank You for the Years (2003)	Get the Party Started (2007)	The Performance (2009)

Singles from Get the Party Started
- 1. "The Living Tree" Released: 27 April 2007; 2. "Get the Party Started" Released: 23 July 2007; 3. "Big Spender" Released: 10 December 2007

Professional ratings
Review scores
Source	Rating
AllMusic	3.5/5 stars
Indie London	3.5/5 stars
The Guardian	2/5 stars
BBC Music	(favourable)

Get the Party Started is a 2007 album by Welsh singer Dame Shirley Bassey.

== Background ==
Released in June 2007, the album features newly remixed tracks by contemporary producers. The remixes feature recorded vocal tracks previously issued in the 1980s and '90s. "I Will Survive" was recorded in 1996 for the album The Show Must Go On but was not issued at that time. In addition, the album features new recordings including a cover version of Pink's "Get the Party Started", which fronted the 2006 Marks & Spencer Christmas advertising campaign. This track was used again in 2010 for the opening credits of the spy-spoof movie Cats & Dogs: The Revenge of Kitty Galore.

The album project was spearheaded by Bassey and saw her working with songwriting partners Catherine Feeney and Nikki Lamborn, who co-wrote the song "The Living Tree". The album was released in the UK and Europe on 25 June 2007. It entered the UK Albums Chart at No. 6, her highest chart position for a studio album since 1970 and since 1978 overall. On 22 July 2013 it was awarded a silver disc by British Phonographic Industry (BPI). Due to the success of the digital download of the single "Get the Party Started" remixed by Chris Cox, Get the Party Started was released officially in the US on 18 March 2008 on the Decca label, making it the first album to be released there by Bassey after a long time absent.

== Track listing ==
1. "Get the Party Started"
2. "Big Spender" (North by Northwest remix) (Vocal recorded in 1984 for I Am What I Am)
3. "I (Who Have Nothing)" (North by Northwest remix) (Vocal recorded in 1984 for I Am What I Am)
4. "This is My Life" (Cagedbaby remix) (Vocal recorded in 1984 for I Am What I Am)
5. "Slave to the Rhythm" (The Glimmers remix)
6. "Can I Touch You There?" (Knut Saevik and Paul 'Strangefruit' Nyhus)
7. "What Now My Love" (Bugz in the Attic remix) (Vocal recorded in 1984 for I Am What I Am)
8. "Kiss Me Honey, Honey" (Restless Soul remix) (Vocal recorded in 1984 for I Am What I Am)
9. "Hello" (Dobie Remix)
10. "You Only Live Twice" (Mark de Clive-Lowe remix) (Vocal recorded in 1987 for The Bond Collection)
11. "The Living Tree" (Catherine Feeney, Nikki Lamborn) *
12. "Where Is the Love" (Bruno E. remix)
13. "I Will Survive" (North by Northwest remix) (Previously unreleased vocal performance from 1996)

* New recordings exclusive to this release.

Get the Party Started (Deluxe version)

The album was re-issued in November 2009 as a digital download only with several bonus tracks and a digital booklet.

1. "Get the Party Started" (Soundscape Radio Edit Mix) (New remix exclusive to this release)
2. "Big Spender" (Pink Pound Remix) (Vocal recorded in 1984 for I Am What I Am)
3. "The Living Tree" (Shaken and Stirred Mix)
4. "The Living Tree" (Promotional Video)
5. "Get the Party Started" (Promotional Video)

== Chart performance ==
Chart (2007)	Peak position
UK Albums Chart	6
