= Al Timothy =

- Birth name: Albon Timothy
- Also known as: "Mr Excitement Himself", "King Timothy", "Timothy Otis"
- Born: 5 July 1915; Radix, Mayaro County, Trinidad
- Died: 8 December 2000 (aged 85); London, England
- Genres: Bebop, calypso, rhythm and blues
- Occupation(s): Musician, bandleader, songwriter
- Instruments: Tenor saxophone, piano, double bass, vocals

Albon Timothy (5 July 1915 – 8 December 2000) was a Trinidadian jazz and calypso musician and songwriter who played numerous instruments but was best known for his tenor saxophone playing. His most successful hit as a songwriter was "Kiss Me, Honey Honey, Kiss Me", written with Michael Julien, which reached number 3 in 1959 in the charts sung by Shirley Bassey.

== Background ==
Born in Radix, Trinidad, Timothy started playing the flute aged 8 years. His father was a musician and instrument maker and encouraged his progress. While working as a tailor he taught himself double bass and saxophone.

He then married Alice Gachette, a business woman and seamstress, and they had a daughter called Lisa Mary Jocelyn Timothy (who became a top international model called 'Schultzi').

Timothy arrived in London from Trinidad in 1948.

== Career ==
Timothy accompanied the calypso artist Lord Kitchener and was bandleader Cab Kaye's featured saxophone soloist. He was also greatly involved in the emerging bebop scene in London. Here he met the famous American jazz patron and Rothschild heiress, Baroness Pannonica de Koenigswarter, when sharing a bill with pianist Teddy Wilson. When she opened the refurbished Studio 51, London's leading modern jazz venue, he became resident bandleader, as leader of Al Timothy and his All-Stars.

He co-led the Timwu-Kee Sextet with Singaporean pianist David Wu and trumpeter Shake Keane at the Celebrity restaurant in Mayfair, a venue which became famous and hosted a broadcast of BBC radio's popular Two-Way Family Favourites. Timothy also appeared on British television's ground-breaking teen music programme, Oh Boy!. His connection with De Koenigswarter brought him to New York in 1956, where she opened doors to the saxophonist, and introduced him to pianist Thelonious Monk, Sonny Rollins and Ernie Henry

On return to England he continued to work as a band leader/saxophonist and songwriter, successes included "Football Football" and "That's What Love Does For You" recorded by Edmundo Ros and David Essex. He also enjoyed success as a cabaret act during the 1970s and 1980s, performing at many well known nightclubs and late night venues, such as The Barn at Braintree, Essex.

== Later years ==
Al Timothy died in 2000 following complications of a stroke in 1999. He was survived by his four children.
