= Burn My Candle =

Single by Shirley Bassey
- A-side: "Burn My Candle"
- B-side: "Stormy Weather"
- Released: February 1956
- Recorded: February 1956
- Label: Philips
- Songwriter(s): Ross Parker
- Producer(s): Johnny Franz

"Burn My Candle" is the debut single by Shirley Bassey. It was recorded in February 1956, when Bassey was nineteen years old, and released later that month on a 78 rpm shellac disc (Philips PB 558), with "Stormy Weather" on the B-side. The record was produced by Johnny Franz, with Wally Stott and his Orchestra backing Bassey. The song was written for Bassey by Ross Parker (most notable for "We'll Meet Again") at the behest of Bassey's then-manager, Michael Sullivan, who was seeking a song to make Bassey stand out.

The BBC banned the playing of the record, presumably due to its suggestive lyrics. In his 2010 biography of Bassey, John L. Williams wrote that:

The song taken in isolation, is blatantly sexual but hardly convincing, as the double entendres of the title give way to single entendres in the bridge – 'There's "S" for Scotch, that's so direct / And for straight and simple sex / "I" for invitation to / A close relationship with you / "N" for nothing bad nor less / "S-I-N", that's sin, I guess.'...And that, right there, is the key to Shirley Bassey's early success: she was blatantly sexy and yet somehow, if not innocent, at least not too knowing.

Despite being popular with audiences, the record failed to chart. In a 2009 interview on the BBC series Imagine, Bassey stated:

It was banned by the BBC, and I didn't know why. And I said, 'Why are they banning it?' And my manager said, well—the lyrics may have something to do with it—and I said, 'Yah? But what?' I didn't even know what it was about. I'd never sung a risqué song and I think they purposefully didn't tell me so that I could give it that innocence.

Its first appearance on an album was The Bewitching Miss Bassey in 1959. On subsequent appearances the song is sometimes listed as "Burn My Candle (At Both Ends)". Most recently, it appears on the CD compilation Burn My Candle - The Complete Early Years. Bassey re-recorded the song in 1966, but it remained unreleased until 1975 when it appeared on the 2-LP set The Shirley Bassey Collection II.
