= Big Spender =

Song from the 1966 musical "Sweet Charity"

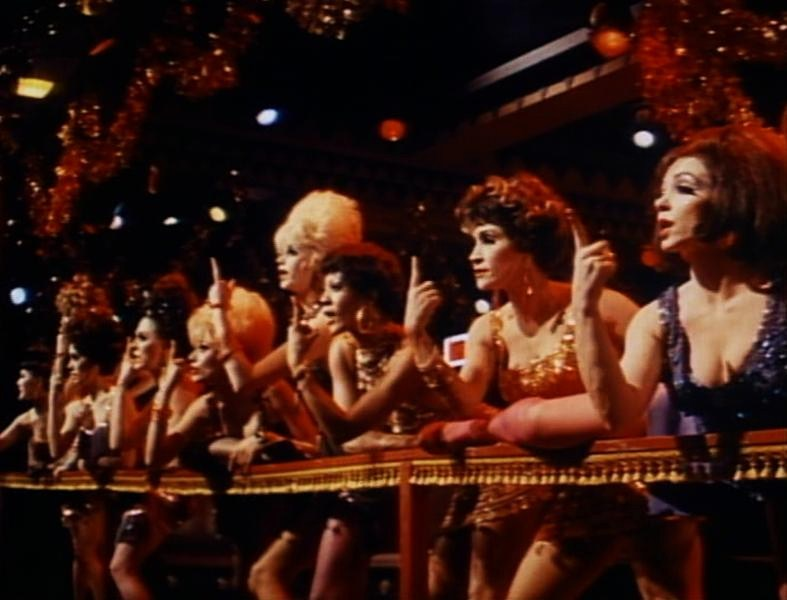
Paula Kelly (third from right) and Chita Rivera (second from right) as seductive dance hostess girls performing "Big Spender" in Sweet Charity (1969).

"Big Spender" is a song written by Cy Coleman and Dorothy Fields for the musical Sweet Charity, first performed in 1966. Peggy Lee was the first artist to record the song (on single released on Jan 29, 1966), also on the album Big Spender (released July 30, 1966). It is sung, in the musical, by the dance hostess girls; it was choreographed by Bob Fosse for the Broadway musical Sweet Charity and the 1969 film Sweet Charity. It is set to the beat of a striptease as the girls taunt the customers.

== Shirley Bassey version ==
"Big Spender"

Single by Shirley Bassey
- B-side: "Dangerous Game"
- Released: September 1967
- Recorded: 1967
- Genre: Jazz, vocal
- Length: 1:48
- Label: United Artists
- Songwriters: Cy Coleman, Dorothy Fields
- Producer: Norman Newell

Official audio
- "Big Spender" on YouTube

A hit version of the song by Shirley Bassey (released September 1967) reached No. 21 in the UK Singles Chart in December 1967. This version is featured in the 2004 film The Life and Death of Peter Sellers, and in the 2005 film Nynne. Bassey often performed the song live, including at the 80th birthday of Prince Philip and the 2007 Glastonbury Festival.

In December 2007, the Shirley Bassey version was re-released in a new remixed version as a digital download. This was the third and final single released from the album Get the Party Started. The single features a remix from Pink Pound and two instrumental remixes that were not included on the album release. Unlike the previous two singles this track featured a remix of a previous released recording, the vocal track was taken from a session recorded in 1984 for the album I Am What I Am. There was no promotion undertaken for the single and no video was made to support the release.

=== Track listing ===
1. Big Spender
2. Dangerous Game

== Other versions ==
- Queen performed it Live at Wembley Stadium on July 12, 1986, and also performed it live in period between 1973 and 1977; it is included on the concert recordings A Night at the Odeon (Hammersmith, 1975) and Live at the Rainbow '74 (Rainbow, November 1974).
- The Pussycat Dolls performed the song live at the 2004 MTV Asia Awards, with Melody Thornton on lead vocals.

== Parodies and alternate lyrics ==
- A well known take-off of the song was shown on The Morecambe and Wise Christmas Show 1975, sung by Brenda Arnau, and featuring Pan's People as guest dancers.
- The song appeared in US television commercials for Muriel Cigars in the 1970s, sung by Edie Adams. A modified version of the lyrics invited the viewer to "...spend a little dime with me", referring to the price of a Muriel.
- A parody appeared on a musical segment of Saturday Night Live on Halloween of 2020 called "Big Spreader", referring to COVID-19.

== Film appearances ==
- During the animated opening credits of The Pink Panther Strikes Again (1976), animator Richard Williams has a lineup of Pink Panthers in a parody of the hostess girls' staging; Henry Mancini quotes "Big Spender," segueing seamlessly into the "Pink Panther Theme."
- In Hou Hsiao-hsien's 1987 film Daughter of the Nile, the song plays twice from Lin Hsiao-fang's restaurant.
- In National Lampoon's European Vacation, Ellen Griswold performs "Big Spender" with exotic dancing while Clark (her husband) videotapes it.
