= Songs of Europe (1981 concert) =

1981 concert held in Mysen, Norway

Date and venue
- Air date: 22 August 1981
- Venue: Momarken; Mysen, Norway

Production
- Broadcaster: Norsk rikskringkasting (NRK)
- Director: Johnny Bergh
- Musical director: Sigurd Jansen
- Presenters: Rolf Kirkvaag; Titten Tei

Songs of Europe is a concert television programme commemorating the Eurovision Song Contest's twenty-fifth anniversary. The event was held in Mysen, Norway, on 22 August 1981, featuring all but eight of the winners of the Eurovision Song Contest from its first edition in 1956 to 1981, and broadcast to more than 100 million viewers all over Europe.

The concert, which was the largest ever in Norway at the time, and still the largest in Mysen, was hosted by Norwegian television personalities Rolf Kirkvaag and children's television character Titten Tei, who led the two-hour live broadcast in English, German, French, Norwegian and Spanish. The majority of entries were conducted by Sigurd Jansen, although the song "Hallelujah" was conducted, as it was in 1979, by composer Kobi Oshrat. "Nous les amoureux" was conducted by Raymond Bernard, "La, la, la" by Manuel Gas, and "Boom Bang-a-Bang" by Kenny Clayton.

== Background ==
The concert was an annual fund raiser for the International Red Cross, with previous headline acts including Julie Andrews, Charles Aznavour and in 1975, Eurovision winners ABBA.

The theme of the Eurovision winning songs was chosen for the 1981 edition, with a double-album containing all 29 winning tracks released by the Red Cross imprinted on their own label to raise additional funding, entitled Eurovision Gala: 29 Winners - 29 Worldsuccesses.

It is the biggest concert arranged to feature such an amount of Eurovision Song Contest artists and more specifically winners performing at once, with 21 out of a total 29 winners (four winners in the 1969 Contest) attending to perform their past winning songs; that is with the Eurovision Song Contest's fiftieth anniversary, Congratulations: 50 Years of the Eurovision Song Contest, featuring most of the artists as guests and not as performers, and the Contest's sixtieth anniversary, Eurovision Song Contest's Greatest Hits, featuring fifteen artists acts.

== The show ==
Heavy rain delayed the start of the concert and interrupted some of the early performances. The songs were performed on the stage or shown in videos, in accordance to the chronological order of the Eurovision Song Contest's winners from the first edition in 1956 up to and including the 1981 edition; although 1981 was the 26th edition, it was held a few months prior to the concert and thus included in it.

Some snippets of earlier ESC performances intermingled into the show. 21 acts performed their winning songs live (although Dana lip-synched her winning song, as she was recovering from throat surgery), including three out of the four winners of the 1969 Contest. The remaining eight winners, marked in light red, were shown in video footage of their performances in their respective editions of the Eurovision Song Contest, where available. Others were shown in still photographs or in clips taken from other broadcasts where no clip from the contest was known to exist. Abba's performance of Waterloo was taken from the televised Red Cross concert the group had performed in Mysen in 1975. Waterloo was the only one of the absentee winning songs performed in its entirety.

Massiel performed a new, extended arrangement of her 1968 winning song, losing her timing and was briefly out of synch with the live orchestra. Martin Lee of Brotherhood of Man fumbled the lyrics of the 1976 winning song, repeating the first verse twice. Despite the rain and the wet stage, Sandie Shaw performed bare foot much to the appreciation of the audience.

The show ended with all of the performers and guest Teddy Scholten appearing on stage for a curtain call and photographs.

Year	Country	Artist	Song	Language
1956	Switzerland	Lys Assia	"Refrain"	French
1957	Netherlands	Corry Brokken	"Net als toen"	Dutch
1958	France	André Claveau	"Dors, mon amour"	French
1959	Netherlands	Teddy Scholten (Note: Attended the show as a guest in the audience.)	"Een beetje"	Dutch
1960	France	Jacqueline Boyer	"Tom Pillibi"	French
1961	Luxembourg	Jean-Claude Pascal	"Nous les amoureux"	French
1962	France	Isabelle Aubret	"Un premier amour"	French
1963	Denmark	Grethe and Jørgen Ingmann	"Dansevise"	Danish
1964	Italy	Gigliola Cinquetti	"Non ho l'età"	Italian
1965	Luxembourg	France Gall	"Poupée de cire, poupée de son"	French
1966	Austria	Udo Jürgens	"Merci, Chérie"	German (Note: The song also contains phrases in French.)
1967	United Kingdom	Sandie Shaw	"Puppet on a String"	English
1968	Spain	Massiel	"La, la, la"	Spanish
1969	Spain	Salomé	"Vivo cantando"	Spanish
1969	United Kingdom	Lulu	"Boom Bang-a-Bang"	English
1969	Netherlands	Lenny Kuhr	"De troubadour"	Dutch
1969	France	Frida Boccara	"Un jour, un enfant"	French
1970	Ireland	Dana	"All Kinds of Everything"	English
1971	Monaco	Séverine	"Un banc, un arbre, une rue"	French
1972	Luxembourg	Vicky Leandros	"Après toi"	French
1973	Luxembourg	Anne-Marie David	"Tu te reconnaîtras"	French
1974	Sweden	ABBA	"Waterloo"	English
1975	Netherlands	Teach-In (Note: The line up of Teach-in was different from the winning 1975 group, although still led by lead singer Getty Kaspers.)	"Ding-a-dong"	English
1976	United Kingdom	Brotherhood of Man	"Save Your Kisses for Me"	English
1977	France	Marie Myriam	"L'Oiseau et l'Enfant"	French
1978	Israel	Izhar Cohen and the Alphabeta (Note: The Alphabeta appeared as a quartet, with two boys and two girls; a different line up from the quintet who had won in 1978.)	"A-Ba-Ni-Bi" (א-ב-ני-בי)	Hebrew
1979	Israel	Milk and Honey (Note: Gali Atari who sang the lead vocal with Milk and Honey when they won Eurovision, was replaced by Leah Lupatin.)	"Hallelujah" (הללויה)	Hebrew
1980	Ireland	Johnny Logan	"What's Another Year?"	English
1981	United Kingdom	Bucks Fizz	"Making Your Mind Up"	English

== International broadcasting ==
The following countries, listed in order of broadcasting dates, had confirmed that they would broadcast the anniversary show.

Date of broadcast	Country	Broadcaster	Channel(s)	Commentator(s)	Ref(s)
22 August 1981	Denmark	DR	DR TV	Jørgen de Mylius	
22 August 1981	France	Antenne 2		No commentator	
22 August 1981	Germany	ARD	Deutsches Fernsehen	Dagmar Berghoff	
22 August 1981	Ireland	RTÉ	RTÉ 1	No commentator	
22 August 1981	Mexico	Canal 2		No commentator	
22 August 1981	Norway	NRK	NRK Fjernsynet	Knut Aunbu	
22 August 1981	Norway	NRK	NRK	Unknown	
27 August 1981	Spain	TVE	TVE 1	Unknown	
27 August 1981	Austria	ORF	FS2	No commentator	
5 September 1981	Belgium	BRT	TV1	No commentator	
7 September 1981	Netherlands	TROS	Nederland 2	No commentator	
18 September 1981	Iceland	RÚV	Sjónvarpið	Björn Baldurson	
21 September 1981	Portugal	RTP	RTP1	Ana Zanatti	
25 September 1981	United Kingdom	BBC	BBC2	Terry Wogan	
26 December 1981	United Kingdom	BBC	BBC Radio 2	Len Jackson	
Unknown	Cyprus	CyBC	RIK	No commentator	
Unknown	Egypt	ERTU	Channel 1	No commentator	
Unknown	El Salvador	TCS	YSR-TV	No commentator	
Unknown	Finland	YLE	TV1	No commentator	
Unknown	Jordan	JRTV	JTV 2	No commentator	
Unknown	Greece	ERT	ERT	No commentator	
Unknown	Peru	ATV		No commentator	
Unknown	Dominican Republic	CERTV	RTVD	No commentator	
Unknown	Sweden	SVT	TV2	Arne Weise	
Unknown	Venezuela	VTV		No commentator	

=== Non-broadcasting countries ===
The following countries originally intended to broadcast the event, but withdrew for unknown reasons

Country	Station	Channel
Hong Kong	RTHK	
Israel	IBA	Channel 1

The following list of countries, which participated in the Eurovision Song Contest at least once, also did not broadcast the show:

- Italy
- Luxembourg
- Malta
- Monaco
- Morocco
- Switzerland
- Turkey
- Yugoslavia

== Official album ==
Eurovision Gala

Compilation album by Eurovision Song Contest
- Released: August 1981
- Genre: Various
- Labels: Polydor; Red Cross

Eurovision Song Contest chronology
Eurovision Gala (1981)	The Very Best Of The Eurovision Song Contest (2005)

Eurovision Gala: 29 Winners - 29 Worldsuccesses (also known as 25 Years Eurovision Song Contest Winners 1956-1981) is a compilation album with the first 29 winners of the Eurovision Song Contest. The album was released in the summer of 1981 in connection with the competition's 25th anniversary show. The first final took place in 1956, and it was thus 25 years since the competition started. However, the final in 1981 was the 26th in a row, and in 1969 there were four winners, so the total number of winners was 29 at this time.

The album cover featured the flags of the 13 nations that had won the contest to date, plus colour photographs of 10 of the winning artists: Jacqueline Boyer, Jean-Claude Pascal, Udo Jürgens, Sandie Shaw, Séverine, Vicky Leandros, ABBA, Milk and Honey with Gali Atari, Johnny Logan and Bucks Fizz, despite Leandros, ABBA and Atari not participating in the live concert. Inside the gatefold sleeve, monochrome photographs of all the winners were printed, with full details of the winning song (date, host city, author, composer, conductor, singer).

For the album release, a newly recorded version with a new arrangement of the 1966 winner by Udo Jürgens was included rather than the original version that won the contest. Additionally, the English versions of both the Israeli winners of 1978 and 1979 were used rather than the original Hebrew recordings.

=== Track listing ===
==== LP 1 ====
Side A

1. Lys Assia with "Refrain" (Switzerland 1956) - 3:16
2. Corry Brokken with "Net als toen" (The Netherlands 1957) - 3:23
3. André Claveau with "Dors, mon amour" (France 1958) - 3:14
4. Teddy Scholten with "Een beetje" (The Netherlands 1959) - 3:00
5. Jacqueline Boyer with "Tom Pillibi" - (France 1960) - 3:04
6. Jean-Claude Pascal with "Nous les amoureux" (Luxembourg 1961) - 3:06
7. Isabelle Aubret with "Un premier amour" (France 1962) - 2:33

Side B

1. Grethe and Jørgen Ingmann with "Dansevise" (Denmark 1963) - 2:55
2. Gigliola Cinquetti with "Non ho l'età" (Italy 1964) - 3:14
3. France Gall with "Poupée de cire, poupée de son" (Luxembourg 1965) - 2:30
4. Udo Jürgens with "Merci, Chérie" (Austria 1966) - 2:42
5. Sandie Shaw with "Puppet on a String" (UK 1967) - 2:20
6. Massiel with "La, la, la" (Spain 1968) - 2:31
7. Salomé with "Vivo cantando" (Spain 1969) - 2:08

==== LP 2 ====
Side A

1. Lulu with "Boom Bang-a-Bang" (UK 1969) - 2:21
2. Lenny Kuhr with "De Troubadour" (The Netherlands 1969) - 3:36
3. Frida Boccara with "Un jour, un enfant" (France 1969) - 2:42
4. Dana with "All Kinds of Everything" (Ireland 1970) - 3:00
5. Séverine with "Un banc, un arbre, une rue" (Monaco 1971) - 3:01
6. Vicky Leandros with "Après toi" (Luxembourg 1972) - 3:31
7. Anne-Marie David with "Tu te reconnaîtras" (Luxembourg 1973) - 2:38

Side B

1. ABBA with "Waterloo" (Sweden 1974) - 2:45
2. Teach-In with "Ding-a-dong" (Netherlands 1975) - 2:24
3. Brotherhood of Man with "Save Your Kisses for Me" (UK 1976) - 3:05
4. Marie Myriam with "L'oiseau et l'enfant" (France 1977) - 2:41
5. Izhar Cohen and Alphabeta with "A-ba-ni-bi" (Israel 1978) - 2:56
6. Milk and Honey with "Hallelujah" (Israel 1979) - 3:27
7. Johnny Logan with "What's Another Year" (Ireland 1980) - 3:09
8. Bucks Fizz with "Making Your Mind Up" (UK 1981) - 2:39

=== Release ===
The album was put together and released by Polydor, on behalf of the Red Cross. It was released all over Europe on double LP and cassette with various titles:

- Scandinavia, Israel, Netherlands, Portugal, Spain, UK and Yugoslavia: Eurovision Gala: 29 Winners - 29 Worldsuccesses
- France and French-speaking countries and territories: Grand Prix Eurovision de la Chanson: 29 winners - 29 successes
- Germany and German-speaking countries and territories: Eurovision Gala: 29 Sieger - 29 Welterfolge

== See also ==
- Congratulations: 50 Years of the Eurovision Song Contest (2005)
- Eurovision Song Contest's Greatest Hits (2015)
- Eurovision: Europe Shine a Light (2020)
