= Eurovision Song Contest's Greatest Hits =

Television programme

Date and venue
- Final: 31 March 2015
- Venue: Hammersmith Apollo; Hammersmith, London, United Kingdom

Organisation
- Organiser: European Broadcasting Union (EBU)
- Executive supervisor: Jon Ola Sand

Production
- Host broadcaster: British Broadcasting Corporation (BBC)
- Director: Geoff Posner
- Executive producer: Guy Freeman
- Musical director: David Arch
- Presenters: Petra Mede; Graham Norton

Eurovision Song Contest's Greatest Hits (also known as Eurovision's Greatest Hits) was a live television concert programme organised by the European Broadcasting Union (EBU) and produced by the British Broadcasting Corporation (BBC) to commemorate the 60th anniversary of the Eurovision Song Contest. The concert took place on 31 March 2015 at the Hammersmith Apollo in Hammersmith, London. Guy Freeman was the executive producer and Geoff Posner the director, both of whom held the same positions as the last time the BBC hosted the Eurovision Song Contest in 1998. Simon Proctor was the senior producer and David Arch was the musical director for the concert. Tickets for the event went on sale at 10:15 (GMT) on 6 February 2015.

Graham Norton and Petra Mede hosted the event, which saw fifteen acts from thirteen countries performing their Eurovision entries from yesteryear. During the televised show, video montages from the Eurovision archives were shown in-between each live performance. The 2015 entry for the United Kingdom, "Still in Love with You" by Electro Velvet, was performed at the concert as the opening act, but never broadcast on the televised show. The 1994 interval act, Riverdance, was reprised as part of the anniversary celebrations.

Several countries confirmed that they would air a delayed broadcast of the concert on various dates that suited the broadcasters' schedules, including Australia, which would make its debut in the Eurovision Song Contest in 2015. The host broadcaster BBC and the Irish broadcaster Raidió Teilifís Éireann (RTÉ) simulcast the show on 3 April 2015, across BBC One and RTÉ 2. In turn, several countries chose not to broadcast the event, including Luxembourg, which had an act taking part.

== Location ==
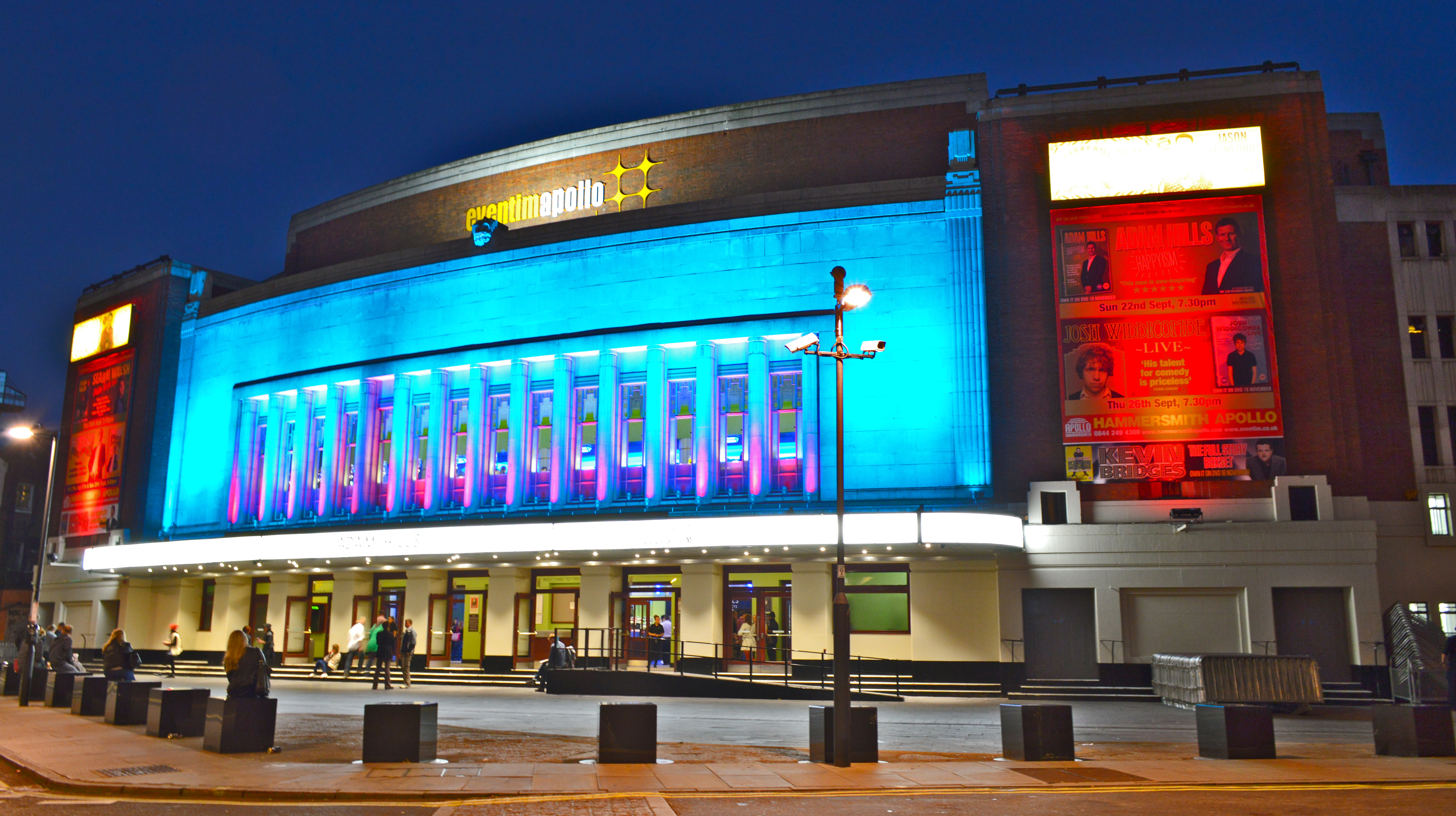
The Eventim Apollo, London

Confirmation came on 3 February 2015 that the concert event would take place at the Hammersmith Apollo in Hammersmith, London. This was the first time that London had hosted a Eurovision event since the Eurovision Dance Contest 2007.

== Organisation ==
It was announced on 22 October 2014 that the EBU had appointed the British broadcaster, British Broadcasting Corporation (BBC), to co-produce a special anniversary show to celebrate sixty years of the Eurovision Song Contest, similar to the show Congratulations: 50 Years of the Eurovision Song Contest which took place in 2005. The BBC's Entertainment department had been commissioned to host the 50th Anniversary show from the Royal Albert Hall in 2005 but this had to be declined as the BBC wouldn't commit to broadcasting the show. The details regarding the title of the show were unknown at the time the announcement was made.

The EBU later issued the following statement regarding the 60th anniversary: "There are various exciting proposals from member broadcasters on the table to celebrate the 60th anniversary beyond the contest in May, which are currently in the final stages of being evaluated. A decision is expected shortly, so stay tuned!". Edgar Böhm, executive producer of the 2015 Eurovision Song Contest said in an interview that the BBC had been chosen to host a special anniversary show. Guy Freeman was appointed as executive producer for the event, assisted by Senior Producer Simon Proctor, the script was co-written by Edward af Sillén, Daniel Réhn, Christine Rose and Simon Proctor whilst the director was Geoff Posner, who had previously directed the Eurovision Song Contest 1998 in Birmingham.

=== Presenters ===
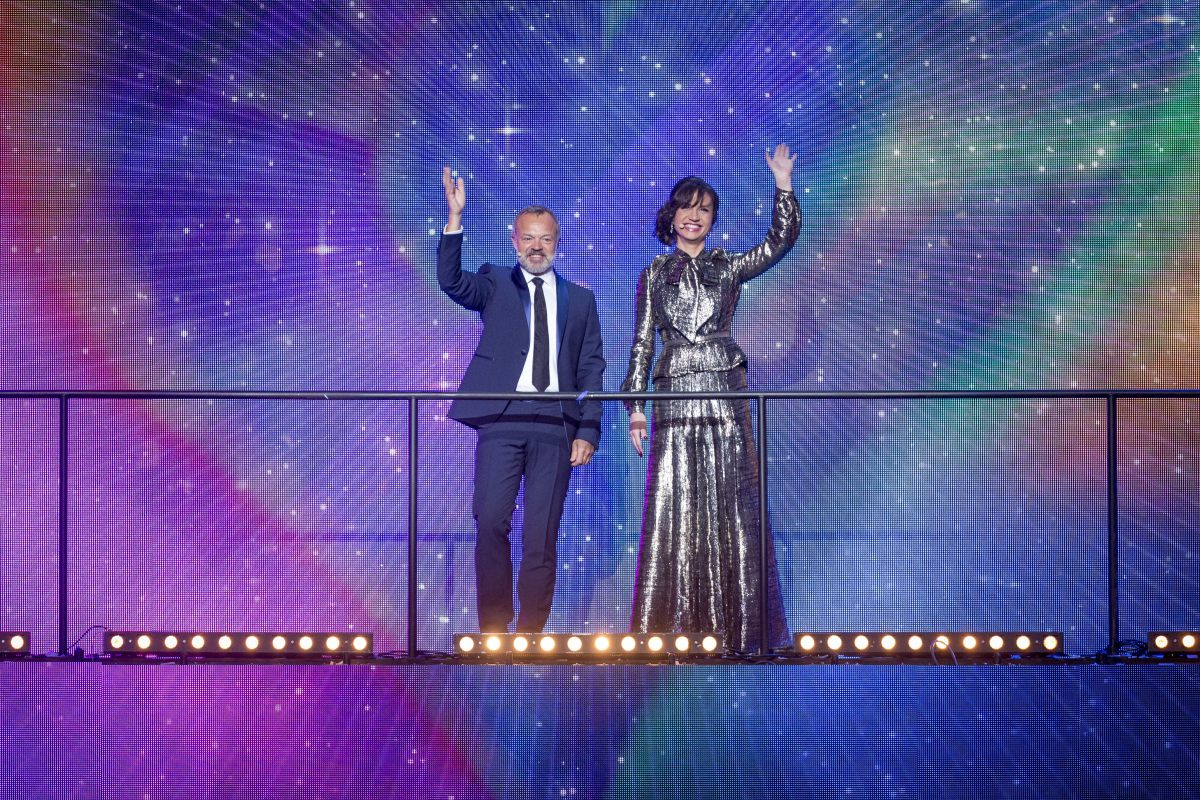
Hosts Graham Norton and Petra Mede, during the show at the Hammersmith Apollo

On 3 February 2015, it was announced that Graham Norton and Petra Mede would co-host the concert show. Norton, who co-hosted the Eurovision Dance Contest with Claudia Winkleman in 2007 and 2008, has also served as the BBC's commentator for the contest since 2009, and would later co-host the final of the Eurovision Song Contest 2023 in Liverpool. Mede was the host of Melodifestivalen 2009, the Eurovision Song Contest 2013, and later the 2016 and 2024 contests.

=== Tickets ===
Tickets for the anniversary concert went on sale from 10:15 (GMT) on 6 February 2015 via the BBC's Eurovision website and the Eurovision Song Contest's official website.

== Programme ==
The concert was recorded live on 31 March 2015 at the Hammersmith Apollo; allowing participating broadcasters the freedom to air the programme on a date and channel that was convenient for their broadcasting schedules. Fifteen artists, representing thirteen countries, took part in the sixtieth anniversary gala event. The first-ever winner of the contest Lys Assia (Switzerland 1956), appeared in the audience as a guest of honour. During the broadcast, video montages were shown prior to each entry, showing footage for that particular year's contest, ending with Eurovision Song Contest footage for the entry that was about to perform on stage. Recap montages of Eurovision entries over the last sixty years, were also broadcast in-between performances. These sometimes differed between the BBC and other broadcasts because of copyright clearance and were as follows:

1. Teach-In – "Ding-a-dong": Netherlands 1975
2. Olivia Newton-John – "Long Live Love": United Kingdom 1974
3. Céline Dion – "Ne partez pas sans moi": Switzerland 1988
4. Jedward – "Lipstick": Ireland 2011
5. ABBA – "Waterloo": Sweden 1974
6. Serebro – "Song#1": Russia 2007
7. Izhar Cohen and the Alphabeta – "A-Ba-Ni-Bi": Israel 1978
8. Kathy Kirby – "I Belong": United Kingdom 1965
9. Bucks Fizz – "Making Your Mind Up": United Kingdom 1981
10. Sonia – "Better the Devil You Know": United Kingdom 1993
11. Imaani – "Where Are You?": United Kingdom 1998
12. Lynsey de Paul and Mike Moran – "Rock Bottom": United Kingdom 1977
13. Michael Ball – "One Step Out of Time": United Kingdom 1992
14. Cliff Richard – "Congratulations": United Kingdom 1968
15. Sandie Shaw – "Puppet on a String": United Kingdom 1967
16. Dana – "All Kinds of Everything": Ireland 1970
17. Sheeba – "Horoscopes": Ireland 1981
18. Amina Annabi – "Le Dernier qui a parlé...": France 1991
19. Roberto Bellarosa – "Love Kills": Belgium 2013
20. Wig Wam – "In My Dreams": Norway 2005
21. Ira Losco – "7th Wonder": Malta 2002
22. Lena – "Satellite": Germany 2010
23. Niamh Kavanagh – "In Your Eyes": Ireland 1993
24. Birthe Kjaer – "Vi maler byen rød": Denmark 1989

=== Opening and interval acts ===
Electro Velvet performed their 2015 entry for the United Kingdom, "Still in Love with You". This performance did not appear on the televised show, but was exclusively done for the audience members of the concert hall itself and was later uploaded on the BBC's social media pages and YouTube channel. The interval act for the show was Riverdance. Consisting of traditional Irish music and dance, and featuring Irish dancing champions Jean Butler and Michael Flatley, with a score composed by Limerick native Bill Whelan, it originated as an interval performance during the Eurovision Song Contest 1994.

=== Performances ===
Fifteen Eurovision acts from thirteen countries participated in the anniversary concert. Although there were originally fourteen acts confirmed by the BBC, it was later announced on 5 March 2015 that Norway's Bobbysocks would join the line-up increasing the total to fifteen. Video montages were shown prior to each entry, showing footage for that particular year's contest, ending with Eurovision Song Contest footage for the entry that was about to perform on stage.

R/O	Year	Country	Artist	Song	Language
1	2013	Denmark	Emmelie de Forest	"Only Teardrops"	English
2	1973	Luxembourg	Anne-Marie David	"Tu te reconnaîtras"	French, English
3	1984	Sweden	Herreys	"Diggi-Loo Diggi-Ley"	English, Swedish
4	1998	Israel	Dana International	"Diva"	Hebrew
5	2000	Denmark	Olsen Brothers	"Fly on the Wings of Love"	English
6	1976	United Kingdom	Brotherhood of Man	"Save Your Kisses For Me"	English
7	1968	Spain (Note: Entries performed as a medley.)	Rosa López	"La, la, la" (Note: Winning song of the Eurovision Song Contest 1968, originally performed by Massiel.)	Spanish
7	1969	Spain	Rosa López	"Vivo cantando" (Note: One of the winning songs of the Eurovision Song Contest 1969 (along with France, Netherlands, and United Kingdom), and originally performed by Salomé.)	Spanish
7	1973	Spain	Rosa López	"Eres tú" (Note: Originally performed by Mocedades, finishing in 2nd place at the Eurovision Song Contest 1973.)	Spanish
7	2002	Spain	Rosa López	"Europe's Living a Celebration"	Spanish, English
8	1982	Germany	Nicole	"Ein bißchen Frieden"	English, Italian, German, French
9	2006	Finland	Lordi	"Hard Rock Hallelujah"	English
10	2001	France	Natasha St-Pier	"Je n'ai que mon âme"	French, English
11	2008	Russia	Dima Bilan	"Believe"	English
11	2006	Russia	Dima Bilan	"Never Let You Go"	English
12	1985	Norway	Bobbysocks!	"La det swinge"	Norwegian, English
13	2012	Sweden	Loreen	"Euphoria"	English
14	1980	Ireland	Johnny Logan	"What's Another Year"	English
14	1992	Ireland	Johnny Logan	"Why Me?" (Note: Johnny Logan wrote the song "Why Me?", which won the Eurovision Song Contest 1992, originally performed by Linda Martin.)	English
14	1987	Ireland	Johnny Logan	"Hold Me Now"	English
15	2014	Austria	Conchita Wurst	"Rise Like a Phoenix"	English

=== Reprise performance ===
A medley of some of the Eurovision Song Contest's hits were performed in English by all of the participating artists, as a reprise act at the end of the show. Anne-Marie David performed the winning entry for Israel in 1979, "Hallelujah". Swedish trio Herreys sang "Nel blu, dipinto di blu", which finished in third place for Italy in 1958. "Making Your Mind Up", the winning entry for the United Kingdom in 1981, was performed by Bobbysocks. The reprise concluded with Conchita Wurst and Dana International leading all of the remaining performers (except Loreen) back on stage to sing "Waterloo", the winning entry for Sweden in 1974.

== Broadcasts ==
As the show was not broadcast live, the participating broadcasters were able to broadcast the show on a date and channel that was convenient for their broadcasting schedules. Some broadcasters – such those in Austria and Sweden – recorded additional links and interviews in London for their viewers and these were used as previews for the main show.

=== Commentators ===
The following broadcasters, listed in order of broadcasting dates, confirmed that they would broadcast the anniversary show.

Date of broadcast	Country	Station	Commentators
3 April 2015	Ireland	RTÉ2	No commentary
3 April 2015	United Kingdom	BBC One	No commentary
4 April 2015	Belgium	Eén	Peter Van de Veire
4 April 2015	Iceland	RÚV	No commentary
4 April 2015	Norway	NRK1	No commentary
4 April 2015	Finland	Yle Fem	Sarah Dawn Finer and Christer Björkman
4 April 2015	Sweden	SVT1 and SVT World	Sarah Dawn Finer and Christer Björkman
5 April 2015	Albania	RTSH	No commentary
5 April 2015	Russia	C1R	Yury Aksyuta and Svetlana Zeynalova
5 April 2015	San Marino	SMRTV	No commentary
11 April 2015	Finland	Yle TV2	No commentary; Finnish subtitles
11 April 2015	Israel	Channel 1	No commentary
13 April 2015	Bulgaria	BNT1	No commentary
19 April 2015	Bulgaria	BNT2	No commentary
25 April 2015	Latvia	LTV1	Aigars Rozenbergs
26 April 2015	Portugal	RTP1	Júlio Isidro
2 May 2015	Slovenia	TV SLO 1	No commentary
4 May 2015	United Kingdom	BBC Radio 2	Graham Norton
12 May 2015	Belgium	La Une	Jean-Louis Lahaye and Maureen Louys
16 May 2015
16 May 2015	Denmark	DR1	Ole Tøpholm
16 May 2015	Germany	NDR and MDR	Peter Urban
16 May 2015	Greece	NERIT1 and N HD	No commentary; Greek subtitles
16 May 2015	Romania	TVR1 and TVR HD	No commentary
17 May 2015	Austria	ORF eins	Andi Knoll
19 May 2015	Switzerland	SRF zwei (part 1)	Sven Epiney
20 May 2015	France	France 2	Virginie Guilhaume
21 May 2015	Switzerland	SRF zwei (part 2)	Sven Epiney
21 May 2015	Australia	SBS One	No commentary
22 May 2015	Estonia	ETV	No commentary
22 May 2015	Germany	EinsFestival	Peter Urban
23 May 2015	Spain	La 1	José María Íñigo and Julia Varela

=== Non-broadcasting countries ===
The following broadcasters declined to broadcast the show:

- Armenia: ARMTV
- Czech Republic: ČT
- Luxembourg: RTL
- Macedonia: MRT
- Netherlands: AVROTROS
- Ukraine: NTU

The broadcasters in the following countries, which had participated in the Eurovision Song Contest at least once, did not announce their plans on whether to broadcast the show.

- Andorra
- Azerbaijan
- Belarus
- Bosnia and Herzegovina
- Croatia
- Cyprus
- Georgia
- Hungary
- Italy
- Lithuania
- Malta
- Moldova
- Monaco
- Montenegro
- Morocco
- Poland
- Serbia
- Slovakia
- Turkey

== See also ==
- Songs of Europe (1981)
- Congratulations: 50 Years of the Eurovision Song Contest (2005)
- Eurovision: Europe Shine a Light (2020)
