= Vivo cantando =

1969 song by Salomé

Single by Salomé

from the album Vivo cantando
- Language: Spanish
- B-side: "Amigos, amigos"
- Released: 1969
- Genre: Easy listening; pop
- Length: 2:09
- Label: Belter
- Composer: María José de Ceratto
- Lyricist: Aniano Alcalde

Music video
- "Vivo Cantando" on RTVE Play

Eurovision Song Contest 1969 entry
- Country: Spain
- Artist: María Rosa Marco
- As: Salomé
- Language: Spanish
- Composer: María José de Ceratto
- Lyricist: Aniano Alcalde
- Conductor: Augusto Algueró

Finals performance
- Final result: 1st
- Final points: 18

Entry chronology
- ◄ "La, la, la" (1968)
- "Gwendolyne" (1970) ►

Official performance video
- "Vivo cantando" on YouTube

"Vivo cantando" (Spanish pronunciation: [ˈbiβo kanˈtando]; "I Live Singing") is a song recorded by Spanish singer Salomé with music composed by María José de Ceratto and lyrics written by Aniano Alcalde. It represented Spain in the Eurovision Song Contest 1969 held in Madrid, and became one of the four joint winning songs and the second song from Spain—and last to date—to win.

Salomé also recorded the song in Catalan, Basque, English, French, and Italian.

== Background ==
=== Conception ===
"Vivo cantando" was composed by María José de Ceratto with lyrics by Aniano Alcalde. It is a very up-tempo number, sung from the perspective of a woman telling her lover about the positive changes he has had on her, specifically that she now lives her life singing.

=== Eurovision ===
On 20–22 February 1969, "Vivo cantando" performed by both Salomé and Ana Kiro competed in the first edition of the Festival de la Canción Española, the national final organized by Televisión Española (TVE) to select the song Salomé –who had already been internally selected– would perform in the 14th edition of the Eurovision Song Contest. The song won the competition so it became the Spanish entrant for the contest.

In addition to the Spanish language original version, Salomé recorded the song in another five languages to promote the candidacy: in Catalan as "Canto i vull viure", in Basque as "Kantari bizi naiz", in English as "The Feeling of Love", in French as "Alors je chante", and in Italian as "Vivo cantando".

On 29 March 1969, the Eurovision Song Contest was held at the Teatro Real in Madrid hosted by TVE, and broadcast live throughout the continent. Salomé performed "Vivo cantando" third on the night accompanied by Los Valldemossa –brothers Rafael, Tomeu, and Bernat Estaràs– as backing singers, following Luxembourg's "Catherine" by Romuald and preceding Monaco's "Maman, Maman" by Jean Jacques. Augusto Algueró –the event's musical director– conducted the live orchestra in the performance of the Spanish entry.

Two memorable aspects of Salomé's performance were her costume –a blue pantsuit designed by Manuel Pertegaz covered in long strands of porcelain resembling beads that weighed 14 kg (31 lb)–, and the fact that the singer chose to dance on the spot during certain parts of the song. Dancing was against the contest rules at the time; Salomé was not penalized, however, as the performers from Ireland and the United Kingdom had done the same that year as well.

At the close of voting, the song had received 18 points, the same number of points as the United Kingdom's "Boom Bang-a-Bang" performed by Lulu, the Netherlands' "De troubadour" by Lenny Kuhr, and France's "Un jour, un enfant" by Frida Boccara. As there was no tiebreaker rule in place at the time, all four countries were declared joint winners. "Vivo cantando" was succeeded as a Spanish entry at the 1970 contest by "Gwendolyne" by Julio Iglesias.

=== Aftermath ===
"Vivo Cantando" was included in Salomé's studio album of the same name. On 14 February 1970, she guest performed the song at the final of the 2nd edition of the Festival de la Canción Española, the national final organized by TVE in Barcelona to select the song and performer for the following Eurovision.

== Chart history ==
=== Weekly charts ===
Chart (1969)	Peak position
Spain (El Gran Musical)	1

== Legacy ==
=== Cover versions ===
- Israeli singer Rika Zaraï released a cover of the French version, which spent three weeks at number one in the French singles chart from 16 August to 5 September 1969.

=== Other performances ===
- Sole Giménez performed the song in the show Europasión, aired on La 1 of Televisión Española on 21 May 2008 to choose by popular vote the best song that Spain has sent to Eurovision.
- Rosa López performed the song in the Eurovision sixtieth anniversary show Eurovision Song Contest's Greatest Hits held on 31 March 2015 in London. (Note: She performed "Vivo cantando" in a medley with other three Spanish entries: "La, la, la", "Eres tú", and "Europe's Living a Celebration".)

=== Impersonations ===
Salomé performances singing "Vivo cantando" were recreated several times in different talent shows:

- In the eighth episode of the first season of Tu cara me suena aired on 16 November 2011 on Antena 3, Francisco impersonated Salomé singing "Vivo cantando" replicating her performance at Eurovision.
- In the sixteenth episode of the sixth season of Tu cara me suena aired on 2 February 2018 on Antena 3, Pepa Aniorte impersonated Salomé singing "Vivo cantando" replicating her performance at Eurovision.
- In the opening number of the first episode of the twelfth season of Tu cara me suena aired on 4 April 2025 on Antena 3, Àngel Llàcer impersonated Salomé singing "Vivo cantando" dressed as her at Eurovision.

== Notes ==
Preceded by "La, la, la" by Massiel	Eurovision Song Contest winners co-winner with "De troubadour" by Lenny Kuhr, "Un jour, un enfant" by Frida Boccara and "Boom Bang-a-Bang" by Lulu; 1969	Succeeded by "All Kinds of Everything" by Dana Rosemary Scallon
