= List of number-one singles of 1969 (France) =

This is a list of the French Singles & Airplay Chart Reviews number-ones of 1969.

== Summary ==
=== Singles Chart ===
Week	Issue Date	Artist	Single
1	4 January	Dimitri Dourakine	"Casatchok"
2	11 January	Dimitri Dourakine	"Casatchok"
3	18 January	Dimitri Dourakine	"Casatchok"
4	25 January	Dimitri Dourakine	"Casatchok"
5	1 February	Dimitri Dourakine	"Casatchok"
6	8 February	Dimitri Dourakine	"Casatchok"
7	15 February	Dimitri Dourakine	"Casatchok"
8	22 February	Dimitri Dourakine	"Casatchok"
9	1 March	Dimitri Dourakine	"Casatchok"
10	8 March	Dimitri Dourakine	"Casatchok"
11	15 March	Dimitri Dourakine	"Casatchok"
12	22 March	Dimitri Dourakine	"Casatchok"
13	29 March	Rika Zaraï	"Casatchok"
14	5 April	David Alexandre Winter	"Oh Lady Mary"
15	12 April	David Alexandre Winter	"Oh Lady Mary"
16	19 April	David Alexandre Winter	"Oh Lady Mary"
17	26 April	Georges Moustaki	"Le métèque"
18	3 May	Georges Moustaki	"Le métèque"
19	10 May	David Alexandre Winter	"Oh Lady Mary"
20	17 May	Georges Moustaki	"Le métèque"
21	24 May	Georges Moustaki	"Le métèque"
22	31 May	Georges Moustaki	"Le métèque"
23	7 June	Georges Moustaki	"Le métèque"
24	14 June	Edwin Hawkins	"Oh Happy Day"
25	21 June	Edwin Hawkins	"Oh Happy Day"
26	28 June	Edwin Hawkins	"Oh Happy Day"
27	5 July	Edwin Hawkins	"Oh Happy Day"
28	12 July	Edwin Hawkins	"Oh Happy Day"
29	19 July	Edwin Hawkins	"Oh Happy Day"
30	26 July	Edwin Hawkins	"Oh Happy Day"
31	2 August	Joe Dassin	"Les Champs-Elysées"
32	9 August	Joe Dassin	"Les Champs-Elysées"
33	16 August	Rika Zaraï	"Alors je chante"
34	23 August	Rika Zaraï	"Alors je chante"
35	30 August	Rika Zaraï	"Alors je chante"
36	6 September	Johnny Hallyday	"Que je t'aime"
37	13 September	Johnny Hallyday	"Que je t'aime"
38	20 September	Johnny Hallyday	"Que je t'aime"
39	27 September	Johnny Hallyday	"Que je t'aime"
40	4 October	Johnny Hallyday	"Que je t'aime"
41	11 October	Johnny Hallyday	"Que je t'aime"
42	18 October	Johnny Hallyday	"Que je t'aime"
43	25 October	Shocking Blue	"Venus"
44	1 November	Salvatore Adamo	"Petit bonheur"
45	8 November	Salvatore Adamo	"Petit bonheur"
46	15 November	Shocking Blue	"Venus"
47	22 November	Shocking Blue	"Venus"
48	29 November	Jean-François Michael	"Adieu jolie Candy"
49	6 December	Michel Delpech	"Wight is Wight"
50	13 December	Michel Polnareff	"Dans la maison vide"
51	20 December	Michel Polnareff	"Dans la maison vide"
52	27 December	Marcel Zanini	"Tu veux ou tu veux pas"

== See also ==
- 1969 in music
- List of number-one hits (France)
