= La La La (Massiel song) =

1968 single by Massiel

"La, la, la"

Single by Massiel
- Language: Spanish
- B-side: "Pensamientos, sentimientos"
- Released: 1968
- Genre: Europop; easy listening
- Label: Novola
- Songwriters: Manuel de la Calva; Ramón Arcusa
- Producer: Juan Carlos Calderón

Eurovision Song Contest 1968 entry
- Country: Spain
- Artist: Massiel
- Language: Spanish
- Composers: Manuel de la Calva; Ramón Arcusa
- Lyricists: Manuel de la Calva; Ramón Arcusa
- Conductor: Rafael Ibarbia

Finals performance
- Final result: 1st
- Final points: 29

Entry chronology
- ◄ "Hablemos del amor" (1967)
- "Vivo cantando" (1969) ►

Official performance video
- "La, la, la" on YouTube

"La, la, la"

Single by Joan Manuel Serrat
- Language: Spanish
- B-side: "Mis gaviotas"
- Released: 1968
- Studio: Polydor, Hamburg
- Label: Novola
- Songwriters: Manuel de la Calva; Ramón Arcusa
- Producer: Juan Carlos Calderón

"La, la, la" is a song released in 1968 recorded by Spanish singer Massiel, written by Manuel de la Calva and Ramón Arcusa of Dúo Dinámico. It represented Spain in the Eurovision Song Contest 1968 held in London, being the first song from Spain to ever win the contest.

Massiel also released the song in English, French, and German. She is not the song's original performer as the initial Spanish representative Joan Manuel Serrat was removed after recording, releasing, and promoting the entry for his demand to sing it in Catalan in the contest.

== Background ==
=== Eurovision ===
In late 1967, Televisión Española (TVE) contacted several record labels requesting original songs to participate in the 13th edition of the Eurovision Song Contest to be held in London. Zafiro-Novola sent them a tape with three songs: "Nos falta fe" by Juan y Junior, "Tirititero" by Joan Manuel Serrat, and "La, la, la" by Dúo Dinámico. TVE internally selected "La, la, la" but preferred Serrat as performer. On 15 January 1968, Serrat agreed to be their representative singing "La, la, la" written by Manuel de la Calva and Ramón Arcusa. In addition to the Spanish language version arranged by Bert Kaempfert and produced by Juan Carlos Calderón, he recorded the song in Catalan (with lyrics by Serrat himself), English (with lyrics by Michael Julien), Portuguese, and Italian, and made a promotion tour throughout Europe. On 10 March, on the evening edition of Telediario, the song "La, la, la" was aired for the first time.

Serrat was under pressure from a number of Catalanists who labeled him a traitor if he did not sing the entire song in Catalan (a language repressed under the Francoist dictatorship until shortly before). On 25 March, he demanded TVE in an open letter to sing the song in Catalan at the contest as he considering himself above all a Catalan singer, and that, in the event that this was not possible, required TVE to accept his irrevocable resignation. (Note: Singing the song in Catalan in the contest was unfeasible since Zafiro, which made all the financial contribution, would lose its investment because it had sold the rights of the Catalan version to another company. To please both parties, Serrat's agent had the idea of Serrat singing the song in Spanish but with a verse in Catalan. To pressure TVE to accept the introduction of the verse in Catalan, they issued this ultimatum. But TVE canceled Serrat's participation without even negotiating. Furthermore, the contest rules specified that the songs had to be performed in an official language of the country they represented, and the right for regional languages to become co-official was not achieved in Spain until the promulgation of the Constitution of 1978.) TVE released an answering press note denying any discrimination against Catalan in the network, considering Serrat's decision incorrect and unacceptable since he sought to give a political meaning to his participation, and removed him as their representative.

Therefore, Massiel, who was on tour in Mexico, was brought in as a late replacement. In just a few days, she had to travel back to Spain, learn the song, record it in several languages (Spanish, English, French, and German), travel to several European cities for promotion (starting in Paris), and go to London for the contest rehearsals. During her short stay in Paris she bought a Courrèges dress which she would wear to the contest.

On 6 April 1968, the Eurovision Song Contest was held at the Royal Albert Hall in London hosted by the British Broadcasting Corporation (BBC), and broadcast live throughout the continent. Massiel performed "La, la, la", the 15th song that night, accompanied by Trío La La La (María Jesús Aguirre, María Dolores Arenas, and Mercedes Valimaña) as backing singers, following Ireland's "Chance of a Lifetime" by Pat McGeegan and preceding Germany's "Ein Hoch der Liebe" by Wencke Myhre. Rafael Ibarbia made the orchestral arrangement of the Spanish entry and conducted the event's orchestra in its performance. The arrangement he created was extremely popular as it accelerated the pace of the song gaining strength.

At the close of voting, the song had received 29 points winning the competition, beating the favorite, the United Kingdom's "Congratulations" by Cliff Richard, by just a single point. Bill Martin (cowriter of the British entry) called the Spanish song "a piece of rubbish". In Spain, Massiel's triumph against the British was compared to that of Agustina de Aragón against the French Army. This triumph was the first of Spain's two Eurovision wins to date. In her winning reprise, Massiel performed part of the song in English, in addition to the original version, becoming the first winner to do so. "La, la, la" was succeeded as a Spanish entry at the 1969 contest by "Vivo cantando" by Salomé.

=== Aftermath ===
Immediately after the contest, Massiel went on tour to several European television and radio stations where she sang the song. It was not until two weeks later that she arrived in Madrid where a large crowd welcomed her in Madrid–Barajas Airport. TVE honored her at Prado del Rey where she gave a crowded press conference with the authors of the song and appeared on several shows on the network. The regime awarded her the Ribbon of Dame of the Order of Isabella the Catholic, but she refused to be decorated by Franco himself, so they sent it to her by mail.

As the winning broadcaster, the European Broadcasting Union (EBU) gave TVE the responsibility to host the following edition of the Eurovision Song Contest. TVE hosted the 14th edition at the Teatro Real in Madrid on 29 March 1969. The show opened with an orchestral performance of "La, la, la" conducted by Augusto Algueró. Massiel gave the medals to the winning performers.

Massiel performed her song in the Eurovision twenty-fifth anniversary show Songs of Europe held on 22 August 1981 in Mysen. In the Eurovision fiftieth anniversary competition Congratulations: 50 Years of the Eurovision Song Contest, held on 22 October 2005 in Copenhagen, she presented one of the contestants. Rosa López performed the song in the Eurovision sixtieth anniversary show Eurovision Song Contest's Greatest Hits held on 31 March 2015 in London. (Note: She performed "La, la, la" in a medley with other three Spanish entries: "Vivo cantando", "Eres tú", and "Europe's Living a Celebration".)

== Recordings ==
Serrat recorded the song in Spanish, Catalan, Portuguese, Italian, –all as "La, la, la"– and English –as "He Gives Me Love (La, la, la)"–. Massiel recorded the song in Spanish, English, French, and German. Juan Carlos Calderón was the producer and conductor of the recordings.

== Chart history ==
=== Massiel ===
Chart (1968)	Peak position
Argentina (Escalera a la Fama)	4
Austria (Ö3 Austria Top 40)	8
Belgium (Ultratop 50 Wallonia)	15
Netherlands (Dutch Top 40)	15
Netherlands (Single Top 100)	18
Norway (VG-lista)	5
Spain (El Gran Musical)	1
Switzerland (Schweizer Hitparade)	8
UK Singles (Official Charts)	35
West Germany (GfK)	12

== Legacy ==
=== Cover versions ===
The song was covered by Italian singer Mina in Radiotelevisione Italiana's 1968 variety series Canzonissima and by Finnish singer Carola. American singer Lesley Gore also recorded a version of the song that year, becoming a minor hit in the United States and Canada. The band Saint Etienne recorded another cover version, featured on the 1998 album A Song for Eurotrash with English lyrics that differ from the original, referring to the man she is dating instead of the things she is thankful for. The biggest-selling cover of the song, however, was the version performed in Spanish by Portuguese fado star Amália Rodrigues. It was also sung by Turkish singer Alpay, in Turkish language as "La, la, la Şarkı Sözü" and released as the B side of his 1969 single "Sen Gidince". Heidi Brühl covered it in German and Marcela Laiferová in Slovak.

==== Lesley Gore ====
Chart (1968)	Peak position
Canada Top Singles (RPM)	86
United States (Billboard)	119
United States (Cashbox)	91
United States (Record World)	96

=== Other performances ===
- Rosa López performed the song in the show Europasión, aired on La 1 of Televisión Española on 21 May 2008 to choose by popular vote the best song that Spain has sent to Eurovision.
- The Orquesta Clásica Santa Cecilia, conducted by Óscar Navarro, performed an orchestral rendition of the song in a concert at the main hall of the National Auditorium of Music in Madrid on 15 January 2015, as part of its Música para Recordar series, which subsequently toured the country.
- In the show La mejor canción jamás cantada aired on La 1 of Televisión Española to choose by popular vote the best Spanish song ever sung, María Villalón performed "La, la, la" in the episode dedicated to the 1960s, aired on 22 February 2019, placing second in the episode competition.

=== Impersonations ===
Massiel's Eurovision performance singing "La, la, la" has been recreated several times:

- In the second episode of the first season of Tu cara me suena aired on 5 October 2011 on Antena 3, Toñi Salazar impersonated Massiel singing "La, la, la" replicating her performance at Eurovision.
- In the sixteenth episode of the sixth season of Tu cara me suena aired on 2 February 2018 on Antena 3, La Terremoto de Alcorcón impersonated Massiel singing "La, la, la" replicating her performance at Eurovision.
- The song's run to victory at Eurovision is recounted in the Movistar Plus+ television miniseries La canción, starring Carolina Yuste as Massiel, which premiered on 8 May 2025. The Eurovision performances and rehearsals are recreated in a full-scale replica of the Eurovision stage at the Royal Albert Hall, which was built in a studio specifically for the filming.

=== In other media ===
Massiel's Eurovision performance is featured in the first episode of the television period series Cuéntame cómo pasó aired on La 1 of Televisión Española on 13 September 2001 with all the protagonist family watching her victory on their brand new first television set. On the occasion of the 50th anniversary of her triumph, the National Museum of Garment in Madrid exhibited the Courrèges dress that Massiel wore at Eurovision –on loan from herself– as part of its Permanent Exhibition from 11 May 2018 until July. Her Eurovision performance also appears in the corporate anniversary video that Telefónica released on 19 April 2024 to celebrate the company's centenary. The song was also used in an advertising campaign launched by McDonald's in Spain toward the end of 2024.

== Notes ==
Preceded by "Puppet on a String" by Sandie Shaw	Eurovision Song Contest winners 1968	Succeeded by "Un jour, un enfant" by Frida Boccara, "De troubadour" by Lenny Kuhr, "Vivo cantando" by Salomé, and "Boom Bang-a-Bang" by Lulu
