= Olba, Aragon =

Olba, Spain
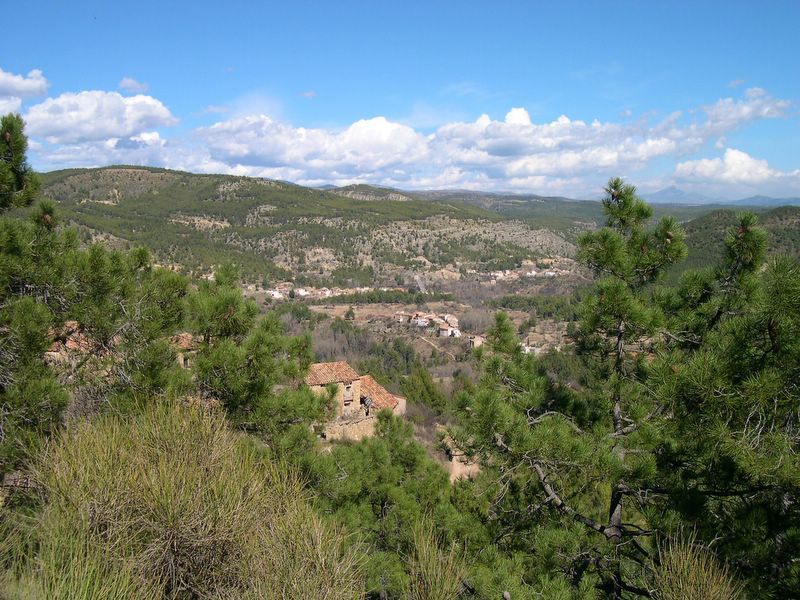

- Coat of arms

- Location within Spain
- Coordinates: 40°08′N 0°37′W
- Country: Spain
- Autonomous community: Aragon
- Province: Teruel
- Municipality: Olba

Area
  - Total: 20.99 km^{2} (8.10 sq mi)

Population (2025-01-01)
  - Total: 286
  - Density: 13.6/km^{2} (35.3/sq mi)
- Time zone: UTC+1 (CET)
  - Summer (DST): UTC+2 (CEST)

Olba is a municipality located in the province of Teruel, Aragon, Spain. According to the 2005 census (INE), the municipality had a population of 233 inhabitants.

The fashion designer Manuel Pertegaz, considered Spain's leading couturier during the 1960s, was born in Olba in 1917.

== See also ==
- List of municipalities in Teruel
