= All Kinds of Everything =

1970 song by Dana

Single by Dana

from the album All Kinds of Everything
- B-side: "Channel Breeze"
- Released: 14 March 1970
- Recorded: March 1970
- Genre: Pop, Baroque pop
- Length: 3:00
- Label: Rex
- Songwriters: Derry Lindsay, Jackie Smith
- Producer: Ray Horricks

Dana singles chronology
| "Look Around" (1969) | "All Kinds of Everything" (1970) | "I Will Follow You" (1970) |

Eurovision Song Contest 1970 entry
- Country: Ireland
- Artist: Dana Rosemary Scallon
- As: Dana
- Language: English
- Composers: Derry Lindsay, Jackie Smith
- Lyricists: Derry Lindsay, Jackie Smith
- Conductor: Dolf van der Linden

Finals performance
- Final result: 1st
- Final points: 32

Entry chronology
- ◄ "The Wages of Love" (1969)
- "One Day Love" (1971) ►

Official performance video
- "All Kinds of Everything" on YouTube

"All Kinds of Everything" is a song recorded by Irish singer Dana written by Derry Lindsay and Jackie Smith. It represented Ireland in the Eurovision Song Contest 1970 held in Amsterdam, resulting in the country's first ever win at the contest. The recording became an international hit.

== Background ==
=== Conception ===
"All Kinds of Everything" was written by Derry Lindsay and Jackie Smith, two twenty-eight-year-old amateur songwriters who worked as compositors for a Dublin newspaper. It sings about all the things which remind the singer of her sweetheart (such as wishing-wells, wedding bells and an early morning dew) with the admission at the end of every verse that "all kinds of everything remind me of you".

Scottish songwriter Bill Martin, who was responsible for the song's publishing, has on numerous subsequent occasions claimed that he and his song writing partner Phil Coulter (the team behind both "Puppet on a String" and "Congratulations") actually wrote the song themselves, but were prevented from using their names on the credit. Coulter has never repeated the claim. Lindsay set the record straight in an interview with The Irish Times Arts correspondent Tony Clayton-Lea in May 2016, in an article entitled, "The Greatest injustice in Irish Eurovision history?". Lindsay died in Dublin on 26 September 2021.

=== Eurovision ===
==== Backstory ====
On 16 February 1969, Dana competed in the Irish National Song Contest 1969, the national final organised by Radio Telefís Éireann (RTÉ) to select its song and performer for the 14th edition of the Eurovision Song Contest. She was a resident of Northern Ireland and citizen of the United Kingdom but RTÉ decided that year to have its entrant in Eurovision represent the island of Ireland in its entirety rather than just the Republic of Ireland. She performed "Look Around" and placed second.

==== National Final 1970 ====
Dana had made such a favourable impression in the previous year's national final that the contest's producer, Tom McGrath, invited her to participate again in the Irish National Song Contest 1970, although the entry reverted to represent the Republic of Ireland only.

On 1 March 1970, Dana competed with "All Kinds of Everything" in the RTÉ national final for the 15th edition of the Eurovision Song Contest. The song won the competition so it became the Irish entrant –and Dana the performer– for Eurovision.

Dana recorded "All Kinds of Everything" following her victory in the national final with veteran Eurovision composer Phil Coulter ("Puppet on a String", "Congratulations") providing the musical arrangement for the Ray Horricks production. The record was released on 14 March 1970 on the Rex label for whom Dana had previously recorded four singles (including "Look Around").

==== Eurovision Final ====
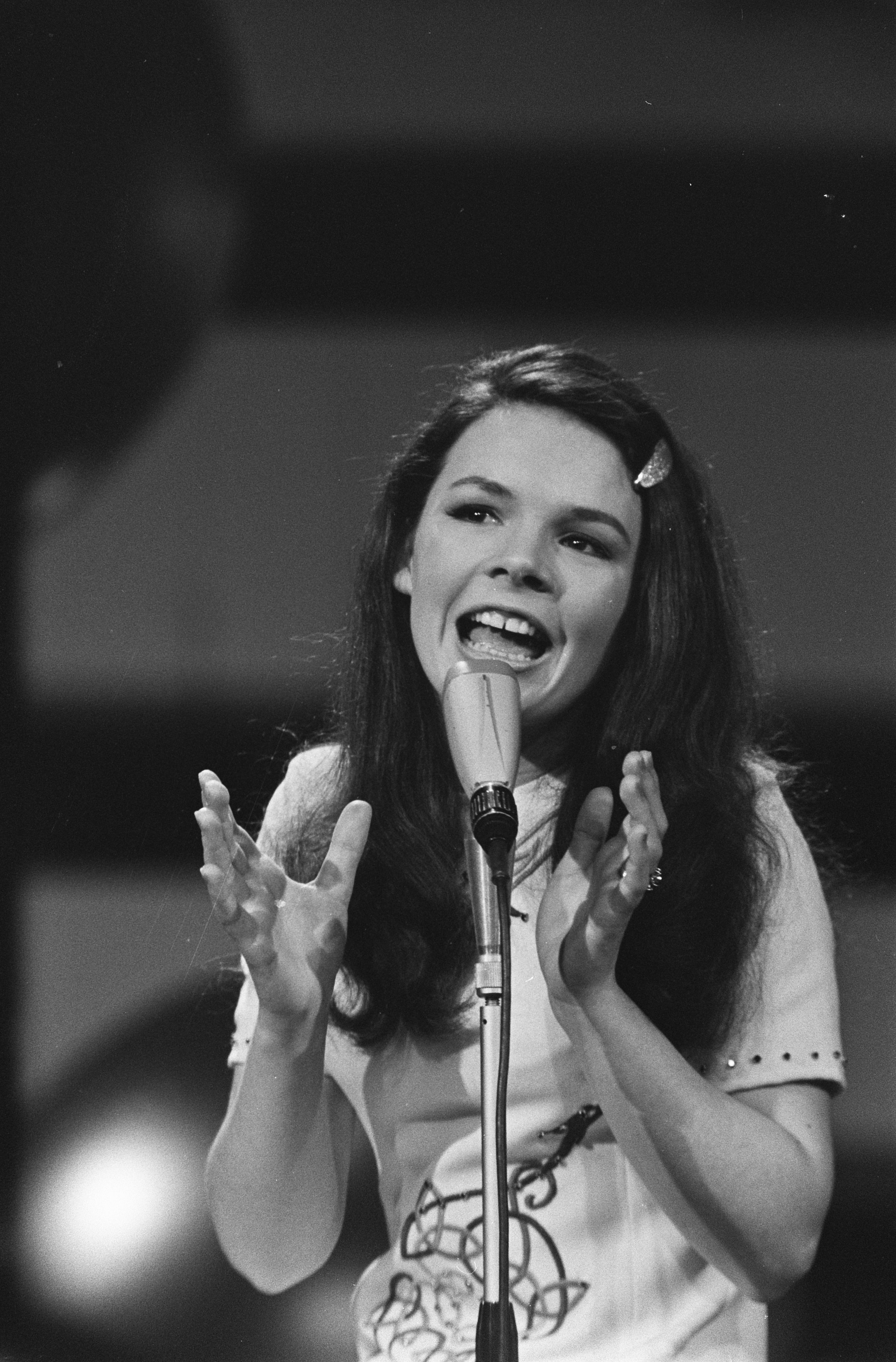
Dana in Eurovision

On 21 March 1970, the Eurovision Song Contest was held at the RAI Congrescentrum in Amsterdam hosted by Nederlandse Omroep Stichting (NOS), and broadcast live throughout the continent. Dana performed "All Kinds of Everything" as the twelfth and final performer on the evening, following Germany's "Wunder gibt es immer wieder" by Katja Ebstein. RTÉ chose not to send its own conductor to accompany Dana, so Dolf van der Linden, the renowned musical leader of the Dutch Metropole Orchestra, conducted the event's orchestra in the Irish entrant. Dana sang seated on a stool fashioned as a cylinder which left her feet suspended above the floor and caused her concern that she'd slide off. However Dana performed the song with the self-possession she had displayed at rehearsals, when the production team had her rise from her stool mid-performance to accommodate a set adjustment she continued singing regardless and earned a standing ovation from the orchestra.

"All Kinds of Everything" took first place in the contest with a total of 32 votes beating second place "Knock, Knock Who's There?" by Mary Hopkin for the United Kingdom by six votes. 1970 had augured to be an off year for Eurovision with five nations boycotting the contest and an apparently predictable outcome with a victory by Hopkin or possibly Julio Iglesias –who in fact came in fourth with "Gwendolyne" for Spain–. "All Kinds of Everything" was the first Eurovision win for the Republic of Ireland; six subsequent victories have made it the most successful entrant in Eurovision. "All Kinds of Everything" was also only the second song sung in English to win Eurovision outright –the first being "Puppet on a String" by Sandie Shaw, with "Boom Bang-a-Bang" by Lulu sharing first place one year previously–. Its win marked a return to the ballad form from the more energetic performances which had dominated Eurovision the previous years.

=== Aftermath ===
The entry was politically sensitive as Dana came from Derry in Northern Ireland, yet was representing Ireland, not the United Kingdom. At this time the Troubles in Northern Ireland were erupting, and some people found political symbolism of a Northern Irishwoman representing the Republic. The United Kingdom's entry the following year, held in Dublin, was sung by Clodagh Rodgers, who was also from Northern Ireland. She received death threats from the IRA as a result of her appearing for the UK. Following her victory Dana returned to Derry and sang her victorious song to a crowd of cheering wellwishers from a balcony in the city.

Dana performed her song in the Eurovision twenty-fifth anniversary show Songs of Europe held on 22 August 1981 in Mysen.

When Dana – as Dana Rosemary Scallon – ran in the 1997 Irish presidential election the Republic of Ireland's Independent Television & Radio Commission requested that Irish radio stations refrain from playing "All Kinds of Everything" on the grounds that airing the song in effect promoted its singer's candidacy. Radio stations who insisted on playing the song were requested to reduce coverage of Dana's candidacy by three minutes for each spin of the record (which is three minutes long). During the election journalist Vincent Browne was criticised for interviewing Dana in a confrontational manner. His apology took the form of a rendition of "All Kinds of Everything" during a subsequent radio panel discussion.

Dana named her 2007 autobiography All Kinds of Everything.

== Commercial performance ==
The song became a massive hit in the Republic of Ireland upon its release on 14 March 1970 even prior to its Eurovision win reaching No. 1 on the chart dated 20 March 1970 and remaining at No. 1 for nine weeks: in October 1970 Dana received a gold disc for "All Kinds of Everything" selling 100,000 units in Ireland. In the UK "All Kinds of Everything" was No. 1 for the weeks dated 18 April and 25 April 1970.

A No. 2 hit in the 1970 Eurovision host nation the Netherlands, "All Kinds of Everything" was also a hit in Austria (No. 3), Belgium (No. 1 in Flanders and No. 14 in Wallonia), New Zealand (No. 8), South Africa (No. 7), Switzerland (No. 3), and West Germany (No. 4). In Australia the release of Dana's "All Kinds of Everything" was preceded by a cover by Melburnian singer Pat Carroll whose version reached No. 25 before the Dana original charted to be ranked jointly with Carroll's version. The highest position this joint ranking reached was No. 34. "All Kinds of Everything" also charted in Italy but failed to become a major hit with a No. 58 peak.

Overall sales for Dana's "All Kinds of Everything" are estimated at two million units.

=== Charts history ===
==== Weekly charts ====
| Chart (1970) | Peak position |
|---|---|
| Australia (Kent Music Report) | 37 |
| Austria (Ö3 Austria Top 40) | 3 |
| Belgium (Ultratop 50 Flanders) | 1 |
| Belgium (Ultratop 50 Wallonia) | 14 |
| Ireland (IRMA) | 1 |
| Netherlands (Dutch Top 40) | 2 |
| Netherlands (Single Top 100) | 2 |
| New Zealand (Listener) | 8 |
| South Africa (Springbok Radio) | 7 |
| Spain (AFYVE) | 12 |
| Switzerland (Schweizer Hitparade) | 3 |
| UK Singles (OCC) | 1 |
| West Germany (GfK) | 4 |

==== Year-end charts ====
| Chart (1970) | Peak position |
|---|---|
| Belgium (Ultratop 50 Flanders) | 41 |
| Netherlands (Single Top 100) | 37 |

== Legacy ==
- In 1970, Australian Pat Carroll covered the song, and it peaked at number 28 on the Australian charts.
- The 1997 play A Skull in Connemara by Martin McDonagh uses Dana's "All Kinds of Everything" incongruously: the record plays during a scene in which three skulls are smashed to powder with hammers.
- A faster, 8-bit version of "All Kinds of Everything" is featured in the NES video games programmed by Hwang Shinwei or published by RCM Group, such Magic Jewelry and Brush Roller.
- An acoustic version of "All Kinds of Everything" was released by Hong Kong singer Albert Au in the album Simple Folk 2 (1998).
- Sinéad O'Connor and Terry Hall recorded "All Kinds of Everything" for the 1998 album A Song For Eurotrash; the track was also featured on O'Connor's 2005 release Collaborations.
- Foster & Allen included their version of "All Kinds of Everything" on their 2001 album The Songs That Sold A Million.
- A German rendering of "All Kinds of Everything", "Alles Und Noch Viel Mehr", was a German hit at No. 26 for Manuela in 1970: Manuela also recorded the song in its original English for her 1971 album Songs of Love.
- Other non-English renderings of "All Kinds of Everything" have been recorded by Willeke Alberti (Dutch: "Duizenden dingetjes"), Cristina (Spanish: "Todas los cosas") and Angela Similea (Romanian: "Dacă visezi cumva"). Singaporean vocalist Rita Chao recorded the Chinese rendering "永遠火辣辣" ("Always burning") as the title cut for a 1970 album release.
- The song was featured in a scene of the 2011 movie Tinker Tailor Soldier Spy.

| Preceded by "Un jour, un enfant" by Frida Boccara, "De troubadour" by Lenny Kuhr, "Vivo cantando" by Salomé, and "Boom Bang-a-Bang" by Lulu | Eurovision Song Contest winners 1970 | Succeeded by "Un banc, un arbre, une rue" by Séverine |
