= Salomé (singer) =

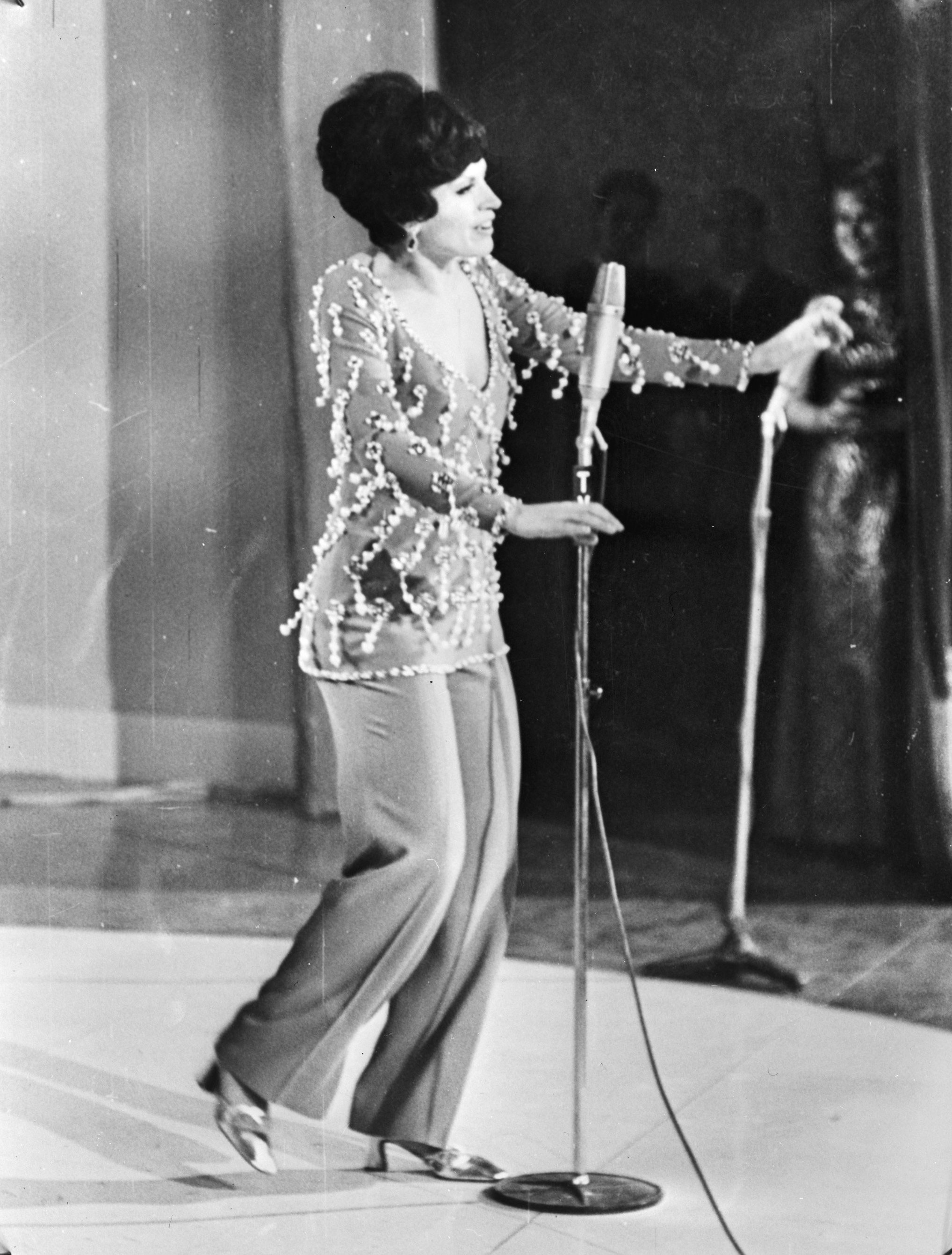

Background information
- Also known as: "La Morla"
- Born: Maria Rosa Marco Poquet; 21 June 1939 (age 86); Barcelona, Spain
- Genres: Bolero, Pop
- Occupation: Singer
- Years active: 1960–2005
- Labels: Zafiro, Belter, Iberofon

Maria Rosa Marco Poquet (Catalan pronunciation: [məˈɾi.ə ˈrɔzə ˈmaɾku puˈkɛt]; born 21 June 1939), better known by her stage name Salomé (Catalan: [səluˈme], Spanish: [saloˈme]), is a Spanish singer. She was one of the four winners of the Eurovision Song Contest 1969 with the song "Vivo cantando".

== Biography ==
She began her career in Radio Barcelona. Since then, she has continued her musical career combining it with television appearances as hostess. She has performed as opening act for Frank Sinatra. By 1963 she had recorded more than forty songs for record companies Iberofón and Zafiro. In 1963 she won the 5th Festival de la Canción Mediterránea de Barcelona music contest with her song in Catalan, "Se'n va anar".

Four years later, in 1967, she won the second prize on the 9th Festival de la Canción Mediterránea de Barcelona with her song in Catalan "Com el vent". She also competed in the Festival de Valencia and Festival del Duero where she won the best singer prize. In 1969 se married Sebastián García. She recorded many songs in both Catalan and Spanish, the most popular ones being "Quinientas millas", "L'arbre", "Bésame mucho", "Com el vent", "L'emigrant", "Puedo morir mañana", "Isla del amor", and "Esperaré".

She represented Spain at the Eurovision Song Contest 1969 in Madrid with the song "Vivo cantando", composed by María José Cerato with lyrics by Aniano Alcalde. She shared the first prize with Lulu (United Kingdom), Frida Boccara (France), and Lenny Kuhr (Netherlands), the only time in the history of the contest when the prize was won by more than one contestant. She received the prize from the previous Eurovision winner, Spanish singer Massiel. Her dress was designed by Manuel Pertegaz, it weighed 14 kg (31 lb) and it was made of small chalk blue porcelain cylinders wearing also three 1 kg (2.2 lb) necklaces. Salomé recorded "Vivo cantando" in eight languages (Spanish, Catalan, Basque, French, German, Italian, English, and Serbo-Croatian).

Awards and achievements
Preceded by —	Spain in the Intervision Song Contest; 1968	Succeeded by José Vélez with "Romántica"
Preceded by (Spain) Massiel with "La, la, la"	Winner of the Eurovision Song Contest; 1969 (tied with (United Kingdom) Lulu, (France) Frida Boccara & (Netherlands) Lenny Kuhr)	Succeeded by (Republic of Ireland) Dana with "All Kinds of Everything"
Preceded by Massiel with "La, la, la"	Spain in the Eurovision Song Contest; 1969	Succeeded by Julio Iglesias with "Gwendolyne"
