= Séverine (singer) =

French singer (born 1948)

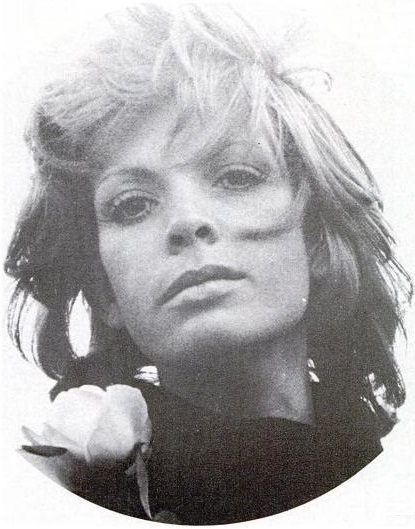

Background information
- Born: 10 October 1948 (age 77); Paris, France
- Instrument: singing

Séverine (born Josiane Grizeau on 10 October 1948) is a French singer.

Séverine won the Eurovision Song Contest in 1971 for Monaco, performing "Un banc, un arbre, une rue" (A bench, a tree, a street), with music by Jean-Pierre Bourtayre and words by Yves Dessca. It was recorded in English as "Chance in Time", in German as "Mach die Augen zu (und wünsch dir einen Traum)" and Italian as "Il posto". The original French version made #9 in the UK Singles Chart in May 1971, whereas the English version, released on CBS rather than Philips, did not chart. The song charted highly in most other European markets. Séverine had further success in France and Germany, but never again on an international scale.

Séverine made two further attempts at winning the Eurovision Song Contest, participating in the German national finals of 1975 and 1982. Neither song won. She accompanied Monaco's delegation to the Eurovision Song Contest 2006 in Athens, Greece.

== Discography and chart success ==
- "Un banc, un arbre, une rue" (#1 Sweden, #2 Benelux, #3 France, #3 Ireland, #9 UK, #23 Germany)
- "Chance in Time"
- "Mach die Augen zu (und wünsch dir einen Traum)" (#23 Germany)
- "Il posto" (#53 Italy)
- "Vivre pour moi" (#32 France)
- "Ja der Eiffelturm" (#27 Germany)
- "Comme un appel" (#24 France)
- "J'ai besoin de soleil" (#29 France)
- "Olala L'Amour" (#19 Germany)
- "Là ou tu n'es pas" (#44 France)
- "Mon tendre amour" (#47 France)
- "Der Duft von Paris" (#40 Germany)
- "Il faut chanter la vie" (a cover version of Cliff Richard's 1973 Eurovision entry "Power to All Our Friends") (#46 France)
- "Vergessen heißt verloren sein" (#47 Germany)
- "Du bist für mich der größte Schatz" (#49 Germany)
- "Sieben Tränen" (a cover version of Goombay Dance Band's 1981 hit "Seven Tears")(#49 Germany)

Awards
Preceded by (Republic of Ireland) Dana with "All Kinds of Everything"	Winner of the Eurovision Song Contest; 1971	Succeeded by (Luxembourg) Vicky Leandros with "Après toi"
