= Orquesta Clásica Santa Cecilia =

Spanish orchestra

- Orchestra
- Founded: 2001
- Location: Madrid, Spain
- Website: clasicasantacecilia.com

The Orquesta Clásica Santa Cecilia (lit. Santa Cecilia Classical Orchestra), founded in 2001, is an orchestra based in Madrid, Spain. The orchestra belongs to the Excelentia Foundation.
