= Rika Zaraï =

Franco-Israeli singer and writer (1938–2020)

Rika Zaraï ריקה זראי
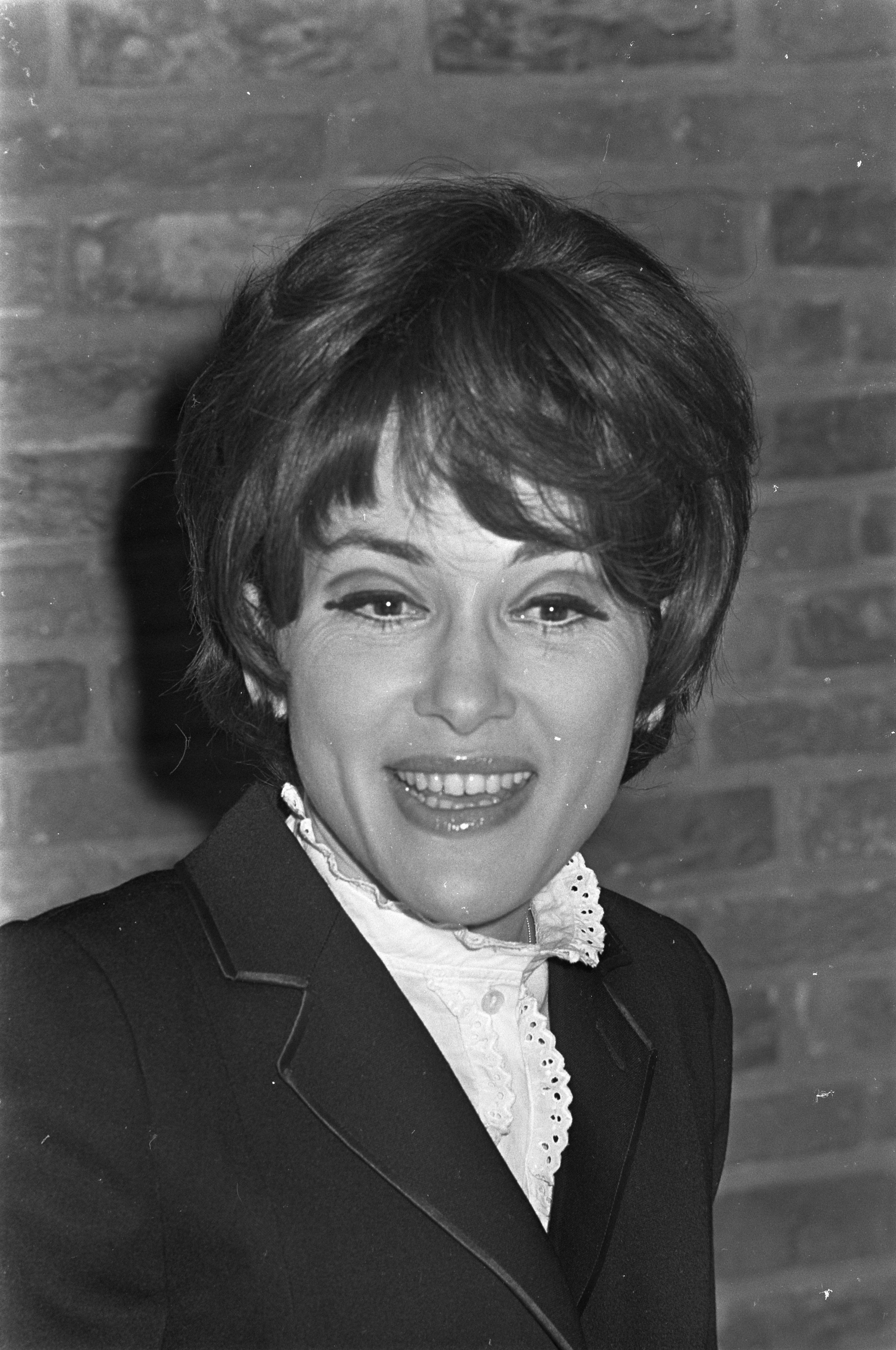
- Rika Zaraï in 1968

Background information
- Born: Rika Gozman; 19 February 1938; Jerusalem, Mandatory Palestine
- Died: 23 December 2020 (aged 82)
- Genres: Middle of the road, Chanson franco-orientale
- Occupations: Singer, Writer
- Years active: 1960–2020
- Label: Philips Records

Rika Zaraï (Hebrew: ריקה זראי; 19 February 1938 – 23 December 2020) was a Franco-Israeli singer and writer.

== Early life ==
Rika Gozman (later Zarai) was born in Jerusalem. Her father came from Odessa (now Ukraine) in the Russian Empire, and her mother from Valozhyn (now Belarus), then in Poland.

She passed her baccalaureate at the age of 17 and enlisted directly in the Israel Defense Forces, a year before her compulsory service would have drafted her. She attended the Jerusalem Music Conservatory where she obtained a first prize in piano. During her 18 months of army service, she was appointed producer of the entertainment troupe of the IDF Central Command.

In 1958, she married Hungarian-born composer Yochanan Zarai, with whom she had her daughter Yael (Yaël Bolender). She would later divorce Zarai and marry French musician Jean-Pierre Magnier.

On November 9, 1969, she was the victim of a car accident. Zarai sank into a coma for six days and remained immobilized in a cast for eight months. Despite a reserved medical prognosis, she recovered completely after three years. It was during her painful convalescence that Rika composed, as a snub to her suffering, the song Balapapa, with joyful lyrics and which would be a great success.

In addition to her musical career, Rika Zaraï distinguished herself in the promotion of herbal medicine from the 1980s. After having studied alternative medicine for eleven years, she published under her name in 1985 a book Ma médecine naturelle (English: My natural medicine), which has sold 2 million copies. Its positions in this field have met with strong opposition, particularly from French pharmacists.

On June 3, 2008, Rika Zaraï was hospitalized urgently following a stroke. She was placed in intensive care at the Pitié-Salpêtrière Hospital, suffering in particular from partial paralysis on the left side of the body.

== Music career ==
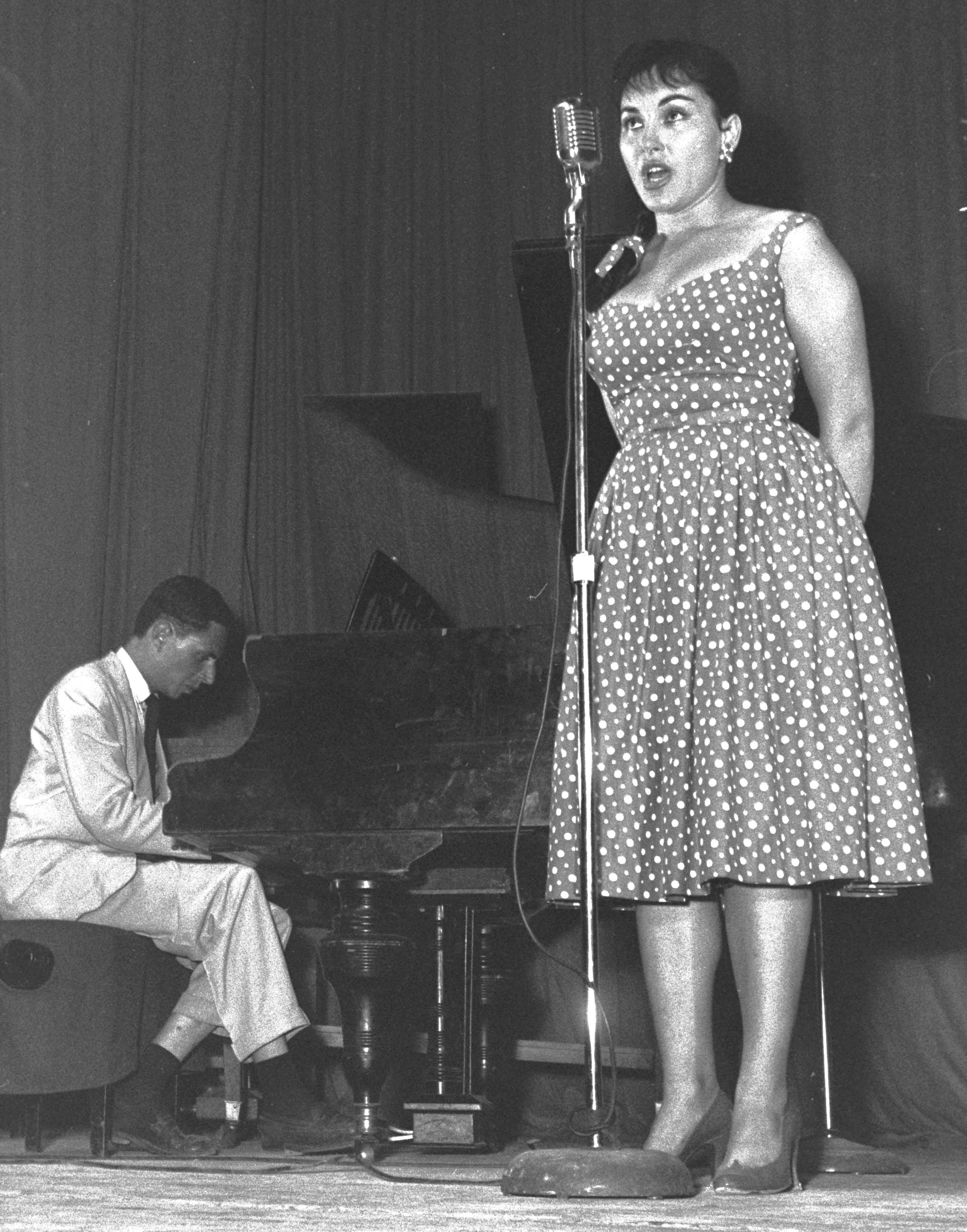
Rika and Yochanan Zaraï in 1958

In the 1950s, the Israeli writer, Aharon Megged, wrote a musical for the IDF Central Command entertainment troupe about five soldiers falling in love with five country girls. In 1956, it was produced commercially by the Ohel theater starring Rika Zarai. The music was written by her husband Yochanan Zarai, with lyrics and melodies by Naomi Shemer.

In 1969, Zarai rose to fame with her songs Casatschok and Alors je chante, the French version of Vivo Cantando. She went on to have a successful career in Europe, where she popularized Israeli classic songs such as Hava Nagila, Yerushalayim shel zahav and Hallelujah.

After publishing other books in the 1990s and continuing to study health, she returned to singing in 2000 with the album Hava. She sang at the Queen in Paris in 2000, and the oriental version of Hava nagila was successful in nightclubs where she sang until 2004.

On February 3, 2020, twelve years after her stroke, she sang in public during the Night of the Depression party organized by Raphaël Mezrahi at the Folies Bergère in Paris.

Zarai sang in Hebrew, English, French, Italian, Spanish and German. She lived in Paris but visited Israel periodically.

== Discography ==
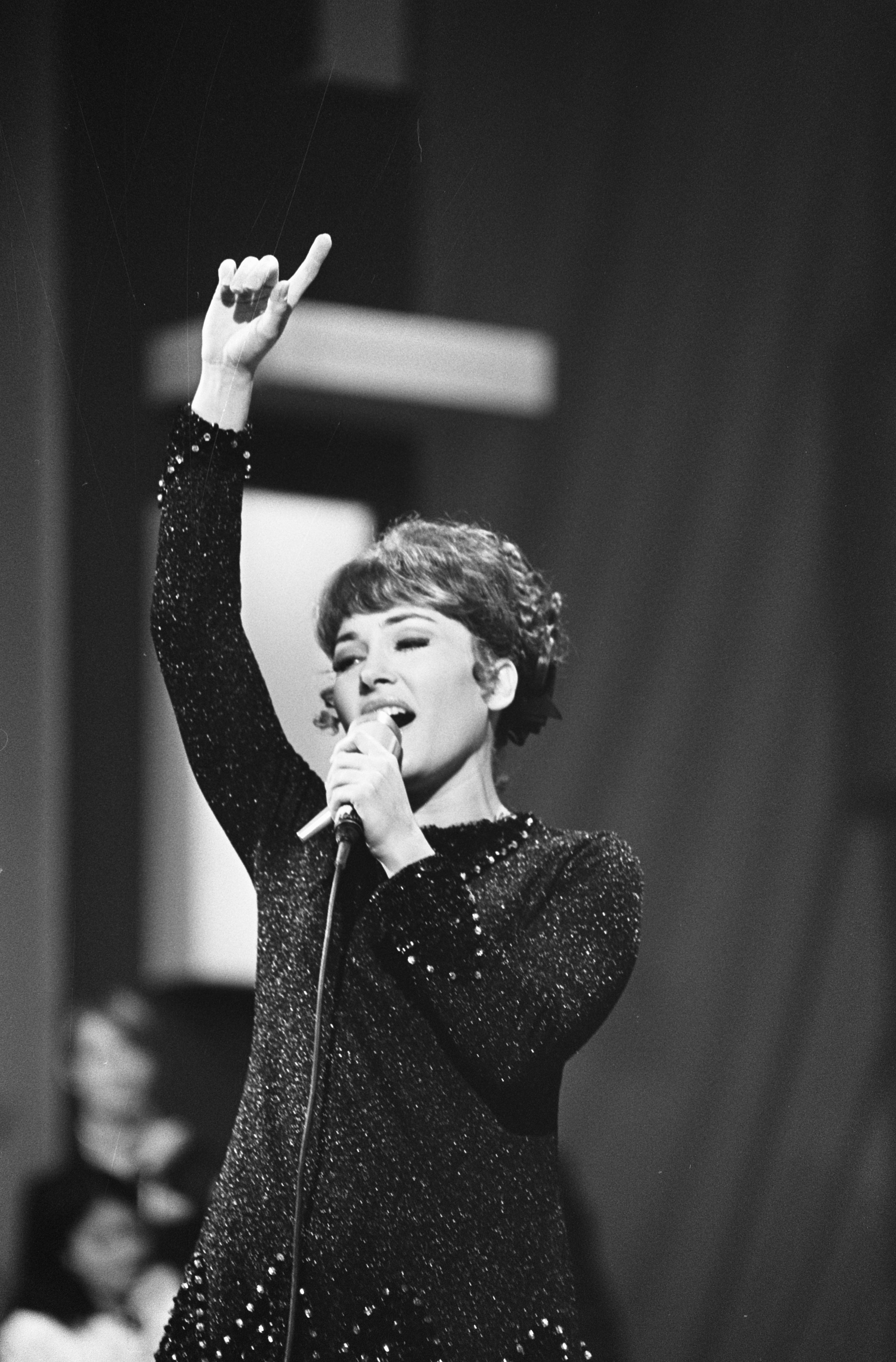
Rika Zaraï in 1969

- Chante Israël (1962)
- Rika Zaraï (1964)
- Un beau jour je partirai (1967)
- Alors je chante (1969)
- Moi le dimanche (1971)
- Les Dessins animés (1973)
- Chansons d'Israël (1973)
- Ma poupée de France (1975)
- Dad li di (1979)
- Chante l'ami (1982)
- L'Espoir (1983)
- Sans rancune et sans regret (1985)
- Story (1988)
- Hava (2000)
- Quand les hommes (2007)

== Published works ==
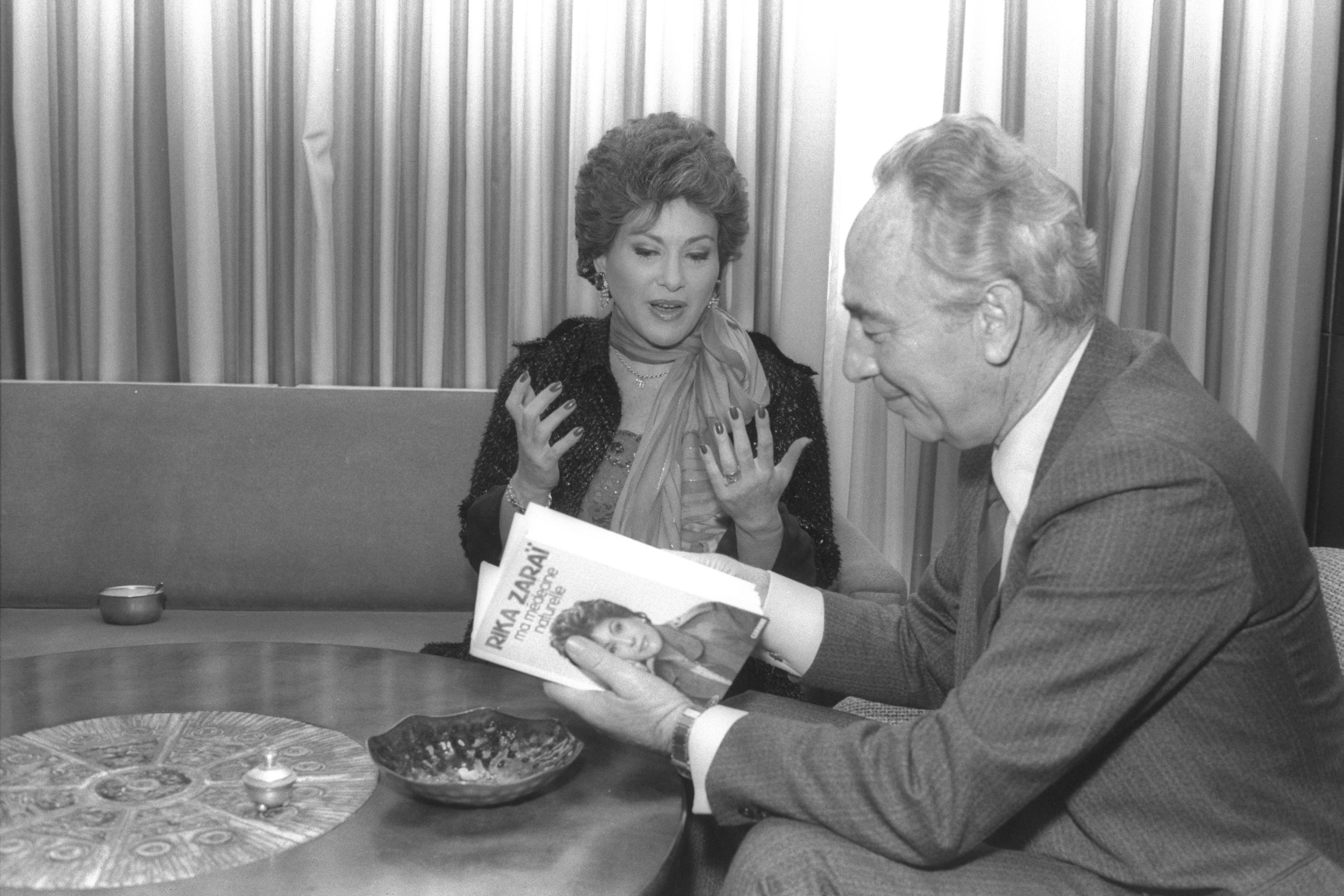
Rika Zaraï presented her book to Israeli Prime Minister Shimon Peres in 1986.

- Ma médecine naturelle, Michel Lafon, 1985
- 47 recettes de plantes, Mangina, 1986
- Soins et beauté par l'argile et les plantes, Mangina, 1987
- Mes secrets naturels pour guérir et réussir, J-C Lattès, 1988
- Ces émotions qui guérissent, Michel Lafon, 1995
- Le Code secret de votre personnalité, Michel Lafon, 1996
- L'espérance a toujours raison (mémoires), Michel Lafon, 2006

== See also ==
- Music of Israel
- Culture of Israel
