= Frida Boccara =

Moroccan-French singer (1940–1996)

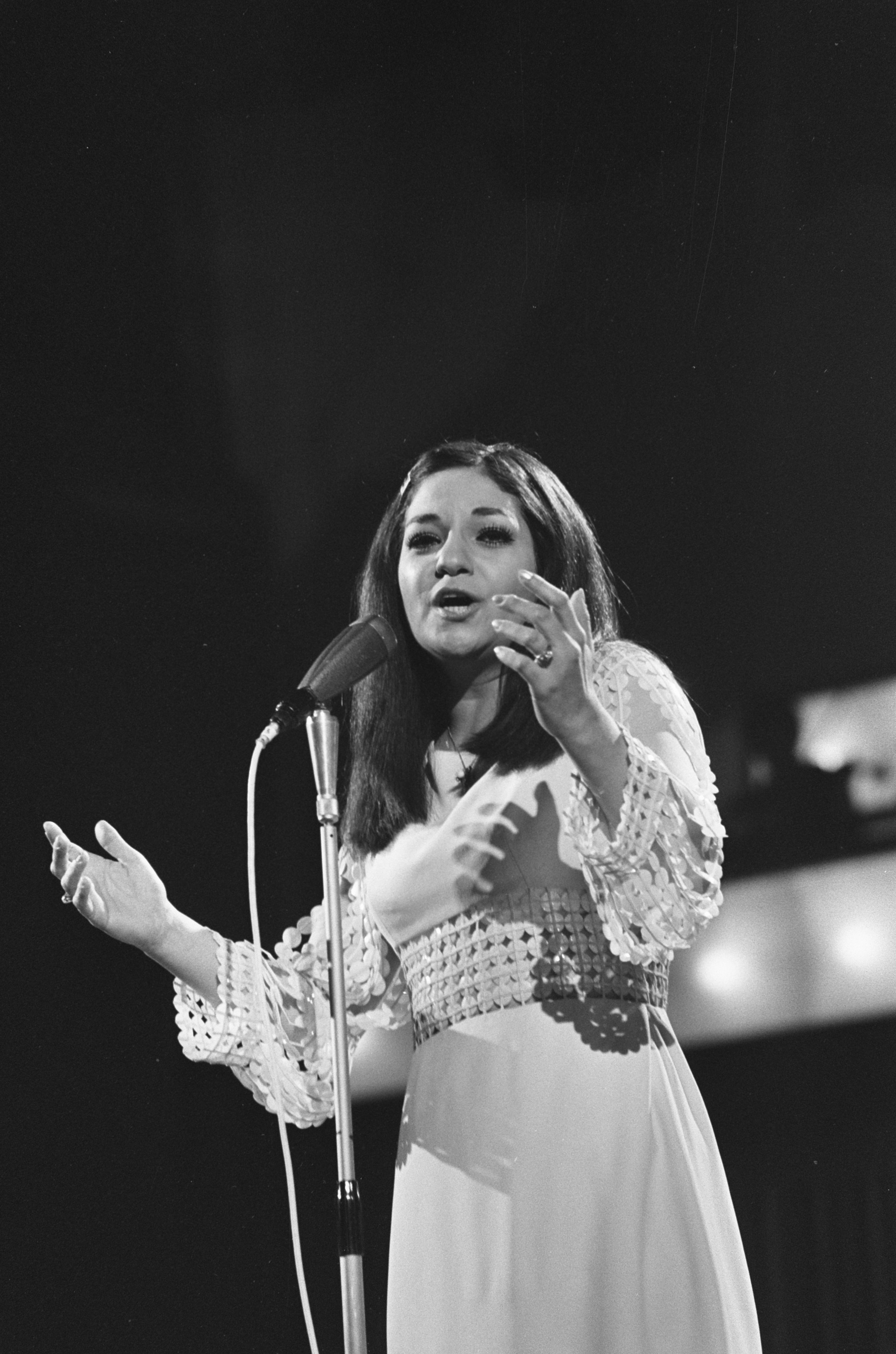
- Frida Boccara in 1970

Background information
- Born: Danielle Frida Hélène Boccara; 29 October 1940; Casablanca, French Morocco (today Kingdom of Morocco)
- Died: 1 August 1996 (aged 55) Paris, France
- Genres: Chanson, French jazz, folk music
- Occupation: Singer
- Years active: 1959–1996
- Labels: Universal-Philips-Polydor; Disques Yvon Chateigner; Edina Music – Nocturne

Danielle Frida Hélène Boccara (29 October 1940 – 1 August 1996) was a French singer of Italian descent, who performed and recorded in a number of languages, including French, Spanish, English, Italian, German, Dutch and Russian.

== Early life ==
Boccara was born in Casablanca, Morocco, into a Jewish family of Italian origin that lived in Tunisia before they settled in Morocco. When she was 17, she moved from Casablanca to Paris, France, where she eventually started her artistic career as a singer. Boccara also had a brother and a sister in show business, composers Jean-Michel Braque (born Roger Boccara) and Lina Boccara. Her son, Tristan Boccara, was born in the mid-1970s and also became a singer known by the stage name Goldinski (he is also a composer, pianist and arranger)

== Career ==
In 1964, Boccara had submitted the song "Autrefois" ("In the past") to the French Eurovision Song Contest selection panel, but she was unsuccessful. Five years later, at the Eurovision Song Contest 1969, held in Madrid, Spain, she represented France performing "Un jour, un enfant" ("A day, a child") – with music by Émile Stern and text by Eddy Marnay. Her song shared first place along with the entries from the Netherlands, the UK, and Spain, the first and last time more than one country was declared the winner.

Songwriter Eddy Marnay was her professional partner (most of the songs performed by Boccara were written by him), but she also performed songs composed by Jacques Brel, Georges Brassens, Charles Aznavour, Émile Stern, Michel Legrand, Michel Magne, Nino Rota and Mikis Theodorakis.

"Cent mille chansons" ("A hundred thousand songs") was recorded in 1968 and earned her a gold disc, while "Un jour, un enfant" (1969) earned her a platinum disc and "Pour vivre ensemble" ("To live together", 1971) earned her another gold. Other of her famous songs include "Cherbourg avait raison" (1961), "Aujourd'hui" (1965), "Les moulins de mon cœur" (1969), "L'enfant aux cymbales" (1969), "Belle du Luxembourg" (1969), "La croix, l'étoile et le croissant" (1970), "Venise va mourir" (1970), "Trop jeune ou trop vieux" (1971), "Valdemosa" (1976), "L'année où Piccoli jouait Le choses de la vie" (1978), "Un monde en sarabande" (1979) and "La prière" (1979). In the late 1960s, she also recorded "Un pays pour nous", a song that was a French version of "Somewhere" (from the musical West Side Story). Leonard Bernstein, who composed the original melody, declared that Boccara's version was his favorite.

== Later years and death ==
Boccara renewed her links with Eurovision by participating in the French national finals of 1980 – performing "Un enfant de France" – and 1981 – with "Voilà comment je t'aime". However, neither song was selected. She died in 1996 in Paris, France, aged 55, from a pulmonary infection, after a decline in health.

== Discography ==
- 1959: "Baccara 9" n° 17 (VA compilation, EP)—Mes frères/La chanson d'Orphée
- 1960: L'orgue des amoureux/Le doux caboulot (super 45 RPM, Festival)
- 1960: Verte campagne/Quand la valse est là/Le grand amour/Depuis ce temps-là (super 45 RPM, Festival)
- 1961: La Seine à Paris/Les amours du samedi/Les Bohémiens/Jenny (super 45 RPM)
- 1961: On n'a pas tous les jours 20 ans/Berceuse tendre/Les nuits/Les yeux de maman (super 45 RPM, Totem)
- 1961: Cherbourg avait raison/Comme un feu/Un jeu dangereux/Tiens, c'est Paris (super 45 RPM, Festival)
- 1962: Les trois mots/Aujourd'hui je fais la fête/Je veux chanter/Je ne peux plus attendre (super 45 RPM, Festival)
- 1962: Le ciel du port/Les portes de l'amour/Ballade pour un poète/D'abord je n'ai vu (super 45 RPM, Festival)
- 1962: Un premier amour/Bruxelles/L'homme de lumière/Les Pas (super 45 RPM, Festival)
- 1962: Java des beaux dimanches/Les Javas/Rose de sang/Quien sabe (Qui peut savoir) (super 45 RPM, Festival)
- 1963: Moi je n'avais pas compris/J'ai peur de trop t'aimer/On les a attendus/Rien a changé (super 45 RPM, Festival)
- 1963: Souviens-toi des Noëls de là-bas/Donna/Johnny Guitar/Ballade pour notre amour (super 45 RPM, Festival)
- 1964: Autrefois/Chaud dans mon cœur/Le souffle de ma vie/Je suis perdue (super 45 RPM, Festival)
- 1965: Tous les enfants/Aujourd'hui/Plus jamais/Un jour (super 45 RPM, Festival)
- 1967: Frida Boccara (1961–1965 compilation, 33 RPM, MusiDisc)
- 1969: Un jour, un enfant (33 RPM, Philips)
- 1969: Les vertes collines (33 RPM, Philips, only released in Brazil)
- 1970: Au pays de l'arbre blanc (33 RPM, Philips)
- 1971: Pour vivre ensemble (33 RPM, Philips)
- 1971: Place des Arts 71 (live in Montreal, double 33 RPM, Philips, reissued in CD format in 2006 only in Canada)
- 1971: So ist das Leben/Er wird dir dankbar sein (45 RPM, Polydor, only released in Germany)
- 1972: Rossini et Beaumarchais (33 RPM, Philips)
- 1972: Greatest Hits (compilation, 33 RPM, Philips, only released in the Netherlands)
- 1974: Je me souviens ("Mia malinconia" and "Je me souviens", instrumental version, from Amarcord by Federico Fellini, 45 RPM, Deram)
- 1975: Oriundi (33 RPM, London)
- 1976: Valdemosa – Oublier (33 RPM, Philips)
- 1978: An Evening With Frida Boccara (live at Dallas Brooks Hall, Melbourne, 2 LP, Philips)
- 1978: L'année où Piccoli jouait "Les choses de la vie" (33 RPM, Philips)
- 1979: Un monde en sarabande (33 RPM, Philips)
- 1980: Un enfant de France/Écrit dans la pierre (45 RPM, Philips)
- 1983: Dis-leur/Aime-moi (45 RPM, Kébec-Disc in Canada and Ariola in France)
- 1984: Cent mille chansons, Série grandes vedettes (33 RPM compilation, Philips)
- 1988: Témoin de mon amour (33 RPM, Productions Guy Cloutier, only released in Canada)
- 1989: Expression (CD compilation, Polygram, 23 tracks)
- 1993: Master série (CD compilation, Polygram, 16 tracks, only released in Québec)
- 1994: Un jour, un enfant (CD compilation, Spectrum Music / Karussell France)
- 1997: Frida Boccara (CD compilation, Podis / Polygram France, 23 tracks)
- 1999: Un jour on vit (CD, Disques Yvon Chateigner)
- 1999: Ses premiers succès (CD compilation, Disques Yvon Chateigner)
- 2003: Canta en español (CD compilation, Divucsa Music SA, only released in Spain)
- 2005: Live Place-des-Arts de Montréal (CD, XXI-21 / Universal Canada, only released in Canada)
- 2006: Un sourire au-delà du ciel (CD, Édina Music – Nocturne)
- 2007: La grande Frida Boccara, l'ultime compilation (CD compilation, XXI-21 / Universal Canada, 25 tracks, only released in Canada)
- 2008: Un enfant de France (CD, Édina Music – Nocturne)
- 2010: Les grandes années – 1972–1988 (three-CD box set, Marianne Mélodie)
- 2010: Collection chanson française (CD compilation, Disques Mercury)

Awards and achievements
Preceded by (Spain) Massiel with "La, la, la"	Winner of the Eurovision Song Contest; 1969 (tied with (United Kingdom) Lulu, (Spain) Salomé & (Netherlands) Lenny Kuhr)	Succeeded by (Republic of Ireland) Dana with "All Kinds of Everything"
Preceded by Isabelle Aubret with "La source"	France in the Eurovision Song Contest; 1969	Succeeded by Guy Bonnet with "Marie-Blanche"
