= Massiel =

Spanish singer

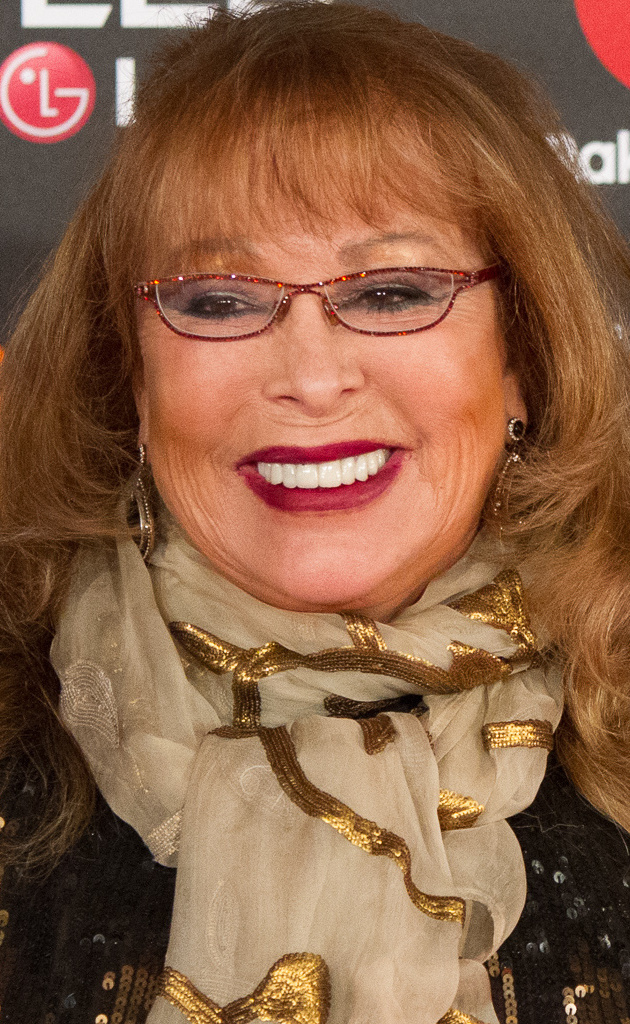
- Massiel in 2018

Background information
- Born: María de los Ángeles Felisa Santamaría Espinosa; 2 August 1947 (age 78); Madrid, Spain
- Genres: Pop; protest song
- Occupation: Singer
- Years active: 1966–1996; 2006–2007

María de los Ángeles Felisa Santamaría Espinosa (born 2 August 1947), known professionally as Massiel (pronounced [maˈsjel]), is a Spanish pop and protest singer. She won the Eurovision Song Contest 1968 with the song "La, la, la", being the first performer from Spain to ever win the contest.

She released her first recordings in 1966. She decided to abandon her music career in 1996, but released another album a year later and a further one in 2007, along with two new editions of 1970s albums.

== Biography ==
Massiel was born in Madrid, Spain. Her Asturian father, Emilio Santamaría Martín, was an artistic manager, so she was around singers and groups from her earliest childhood, and at a young age she decided to become a singer, actress, and songwriter. Her Asturian mother was Concepción Espinosa Peñas (1920–2011).

She released her first recordings in 1966: "Di que no", "No sé porqué", "Llueve", "No comprendo", "Y sabes qué vi", "Rufo el pescador", "Aleluya", and "Él era mi amigo. The song "Rosas en el mar", written by her friend Luis Eduardo Aute in 1967, established her as a singer in Spain and Latin America. In 1967, she acted in the film Vestida de novia.

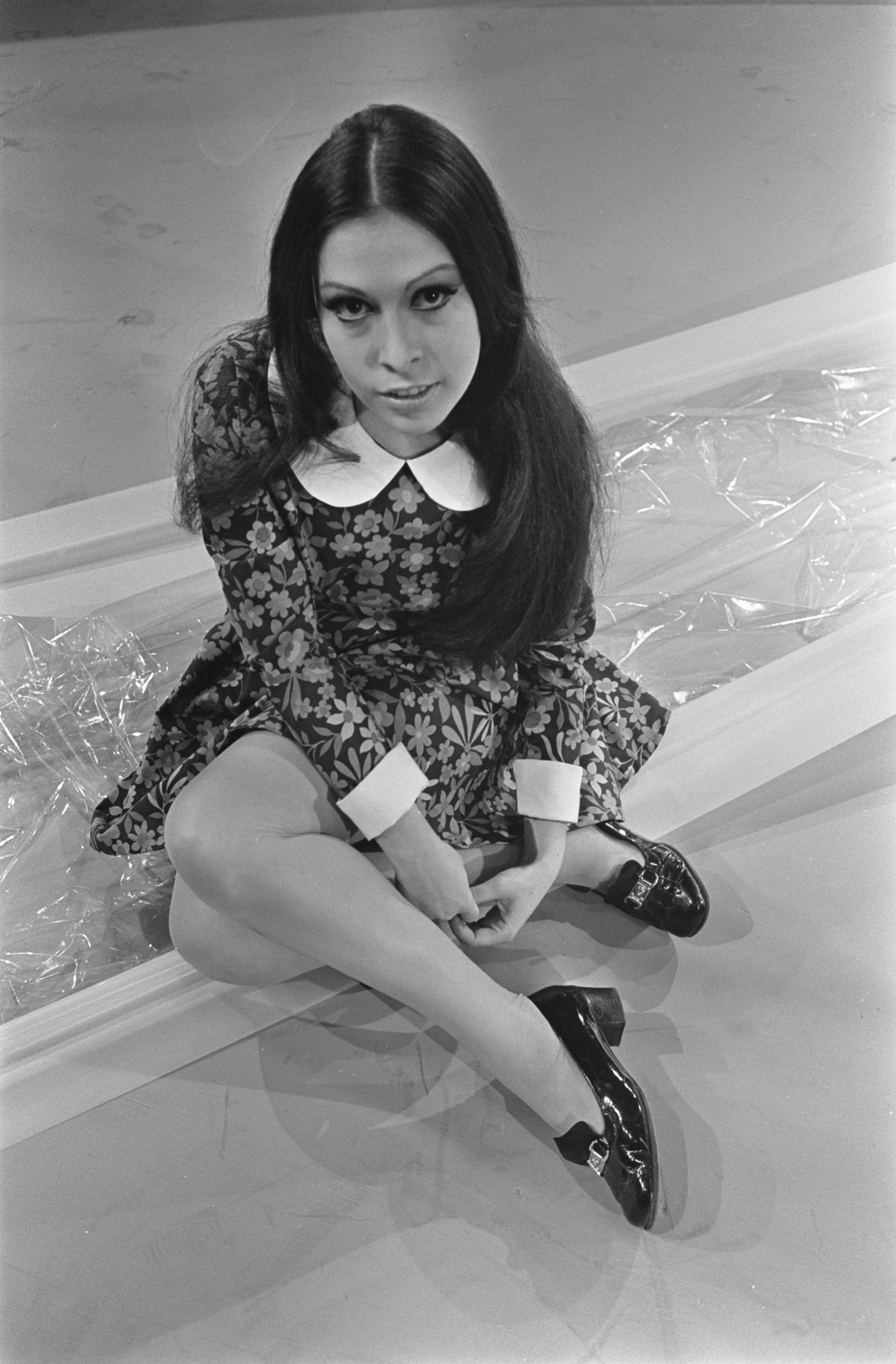
Massiel in 1968

On 25 March 1968, Joan Manuel Serrat, the Spanish representative in the Eurovision Song Contest 1968, was removed after recording, releasing, and promoting the song "La, la, la" –written by Manuel de la Calva and Ramón Arcusa, the members of Dúo Dinámico–, for his demand to sing it in Catalan in the contest. Therefore, Massiel, who was on tour in Mexico, was brought in as a late replacement. In just a few days, she had to rush back to Spain, learn the song, record it in several languages –Spanish, English, French, and German–, travel to several European cities for promotion, and go to London for the contest rehearsals. On 6 April 1968, she performed "La, la, la" in the Eurovision Song Contest held at the Royal Albert Hall winning the competition beating the favorite, "Congratulations" by Cliff Richard, by just one point. She became the first performer from Spain to ever win the contest.

In 1969, Massiel appeared in the film Cantando a la Vida, which profiled a winner of a European song festival suddenly disappearing. Massiel had the lead role of María and also sang the entire soundtrack to the film. Some years later, she performed dramatic roles in theatrical productions like A los hombres futuros, yo Bertolt Brecht (1972), Corridos de la revolución: Mexico 1910 (1976) and Antonio y Cleopatra in 1980.

From 1966 to 1998, Massiel recorded songs of different genres for five record companies: Zafiro, PolyGram, Hispavox, Bat Discos, and Emasstor. Her discography includes around fifty records released as EPs, singles, LPs, CDs, and compilations. In 1997 she released a Spanish album called Baladas y canciones de Bertolt Brecht. Massiel returned in 1981 with a brand-new sound and a new record label, Hispavox. Her label début, Tiempos Dificiles, was a major comeback in Spain where songs like "El Amor", "Hello America" and covers of Mexican songs "Eres" –written by José María Napoleón– and "El Noa Noa" –written by Juan Gabriel– not only exposed Mexican talent in Spain but were very popular for the singer. Massiel would finish her pop comeback in 1983 with her career-defining record, Corazon de hierro. Not only was this album successful in her native country, but it was also her reconciliation with Latin America. The song "Brindaremos por él" was a massive hit worldwide and topped the charts in many countries.

During the 1980s, Massiel was an invited artist at the Viña del Mar International Song Festival in Chile because of her local popularity. At the time Chile was under the rule of Augusto Pinochet. After singing for an hour, Massiel received the festival's most important prize, La Gaviota de Plata (The Silver Seagull). In her speech of gratitude she said: "Thank you Chile, I would like to let you know that Patricio Manns says hello from the Andes Mountains." The public cheered and celebrated her announcement as Patricio Manns is a well-known composer, poet and member of the Communist Party of Chile who was in exile in Sweden following the 11 September 1973 coup d'état against Salvador Allende.

She re-recorded her Eurovision winner "La, la, la" in 1997, with a 'hip-hop' beat, background singers, whistling and Spanish percussion. In 2001, Massiel fell out of the window of her second-floor flat while "trying to close the shutters" –although many speculate she fell while drunk– and was hospitalized briefly. In 2005, she appeared on the fiftieth anniversary special Congratulations: 50 Years of the Eurovision Song Contest and sang the song that made her internationally famous. In 2007 she became a member of the Mission Eurovision jury, the national final to select the Spanish song and performer for the Eurovision Song Contest 2007. She made a short comeback to sing on this show "Busco un hombre", one of the songs in competition, to be sung by the show's winning performer. It had been eleven years since Massiel had been on stage.

In 2012, Massiel starred in the Spanish production of Follies by Stephen Sondheim under the direction of Mario Gas, in the role of Carlotta Campion, the yesteryear film star who sings the iconic tune "I'm Still Here". The production ran from February to April at the Teatro Español in Madrid.

== Discography ==
Some singles:

- 1966: "Di que no"
- 1966: "Él era mi amigo"/"Sé que ries al pensar"
- 1967: "Rosas en el mar" #1 Mexico
- 1967: "Aleluya Nº1" #1 Mexico
- 1967: "La moza de los ojos tristes"/"Mirlos, molinos y sol"
- 1968: "La, la, la"/"Pensamientos, sentimientos"
  - 1968: "La, la, la (German version)" International
  - 1968: "La, la, la"/Pensamientos, sentimientos" International
  - 1968: "La, la, la"/"He gives me love (La, la, la English version)" International
  - 1968: "La, la, la"/"Las estrellas lo sabrán" International
  - 1968: "La, la, la"/"Rosas en el mar" International
- 1968: "Deja la flor"/"Sol de medianoche"
- 1968: "Las rocas y el mar"/"Vida y muerte"
- 1968: "Niños y hombres"/"A espaldas de mi pueblo"
- 1969: "Amén"/"Ay volar"
- 1970: "Cantan las sirenas"/"Canciones"
- 1970: "Detrás de la montaña"/Viejo marino"
- 1971: "Dormido amor"
- 1972: "Balada de Maria Sanders"/Balada de la comodidad"
- 1973: "Rompe los silencios"/"Corriendo, corriendo"
- 1977: "Tu me preguntas si soy feliz"/"Para vivir"
- 1981: "El Noa Noa"/"El Amor"
- 1982: "Eres/De 7 a 9"
- 1982: "Tiempos difíciles"/"Loca"
- 1983: "Marinero"/"Otra mujer"
- 1983: "Brindaremos por él"/"Ay la nena"
- 1983: "Más fuerte"/"Basta de peleas"
- 1984: "Acordeón"
- 1984: "Voy a empezar de nuevo"/"Te fuiste"
- 1985: "Vaca pagana"/"Popurrí"
- 1985: "Rosas en el mar"
- 1985: "Qué más quisiera yo"
- 1986: "Volverán"/"Hoy me he propuesto pensar en ti"
- 1986: "Lo que cambie por ti"/"Poco después de las 12 de un 20 de marzo"
- 1990: "Ese es mi pueblo"

Some albums and LPs:

- 1968: Cantando a la vida soundtrack
- 1970: Massiel en México
- 1972: Baladas de Bertolt Brecht
- 1972: Lo mejor de Massiel
- 1975: Viva
- 1976: Carabina 30-30
- 1977: Alineación
- 1981: Tiempos difíciles
- 1982: Rosas en el mar
- 1983: Corazón de hierro
- 1984: Sola en libertad
- 1985: Massiel en Des...Concierto
- 1986: Desde dentro
- 1990: Deslices
- 1997: Desátame
- 1997: Autoretrato: Lo mejor de Massiel
- 1998: Grandes Éxitos
- 1999: Todas sus grabaciones en Polydor (1976–1977)
- 2003: Sus primeros años (1966–1975) 2 CD's
- 2007: Massiel canta a Bertolt Brecht (CD + Book)
- 2008: Sus álbumes

== Filmography ==
=== Film ===
- Vestida de novia (1967)
- Cantando a la Vida (1969)
- El taxi de los conflictos (1969)
- La vida alegre (1987)
- Dying of Laughter (1999)

=== Stage ===
- A los hombres futuros, yo Bertolt Brecht (1972)
- Corridos de la revolución: Mexico 1910 (1976)
- Antonio y Cleopatra (1980)
- Follies (2012)

Awards and achievements
Preceded by (United Kingdom) Sandie Shaw with "Puppet on a String"	Winner of the Eurovision Song Contest; 1968	Succeeded by (United Kingdom) Lulu with "Boom Bang-a-Bang" (Spain) Salomé with "Vivo cantando" (France) Frida Boccara with "Un jour, un enfant" (Netherlands) Lenny Kuhr with "De troubadour"
Preceded by Raphael with "Hablemos del amor"	Spain in the Eurovision Song Contest; 1968	Succeeded by Salomé with "Vivo cantando"
