= Manuel Pertegaz =

Spanish fashion designer

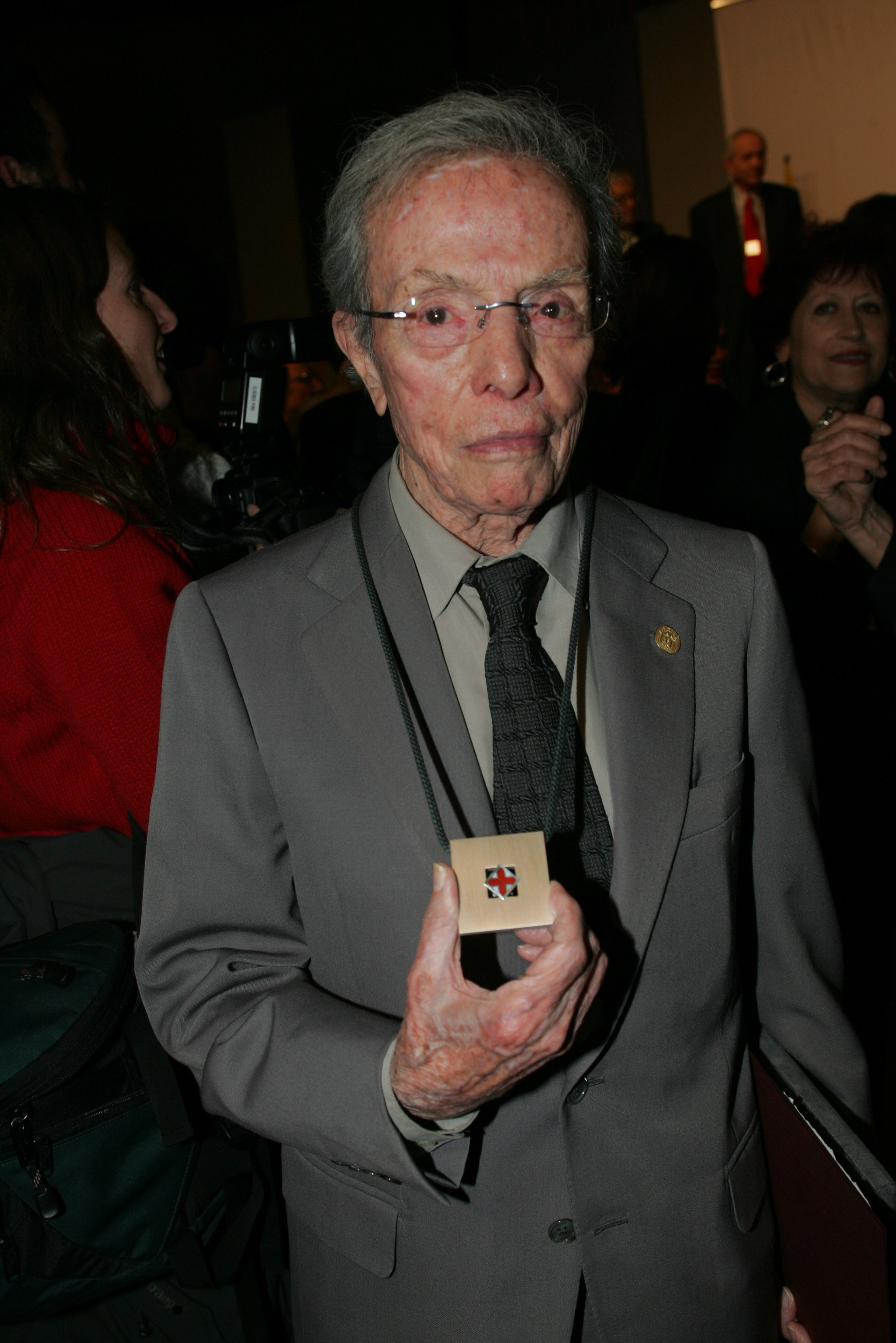
- Born: Manuel Pertegaz Ibáñez; 18 May 1918; Olba (Teruel), Spain
- Died: 30 August 2014 (aged 96); Barcelona, Spain
- Occupation: Fashion designer
- Label: Pertegaz

Manuel Pertegaz Ibáñez (18 May 1918 – 30 August 2014) known as Manuel Pertegaz or simply as Pertegaz was a Spanish fashion designer. He was so highly regarded that he was asked to succeed Christian Dior in 1957 as head designer at Dior, but chose to remain in Spain, where by the 1960s he was considered its leading couturier.

== Early life ==
Manuel Pertegaz Ibáñez kept his date of birth relatively secret, although obituaries place the year as 1917. He was born in Olba, in Aragon, but relocated to Barcelona with his family a few years afterwards.

Aged 13, the young Pertegaz started working for a tailor's in Barcelona, and soon afterwards joined the Angulo team of tailors. When Angulo launched a line of women's clothing, Pertegaz discovered that womenswear was where his talents lay.

== Career ==
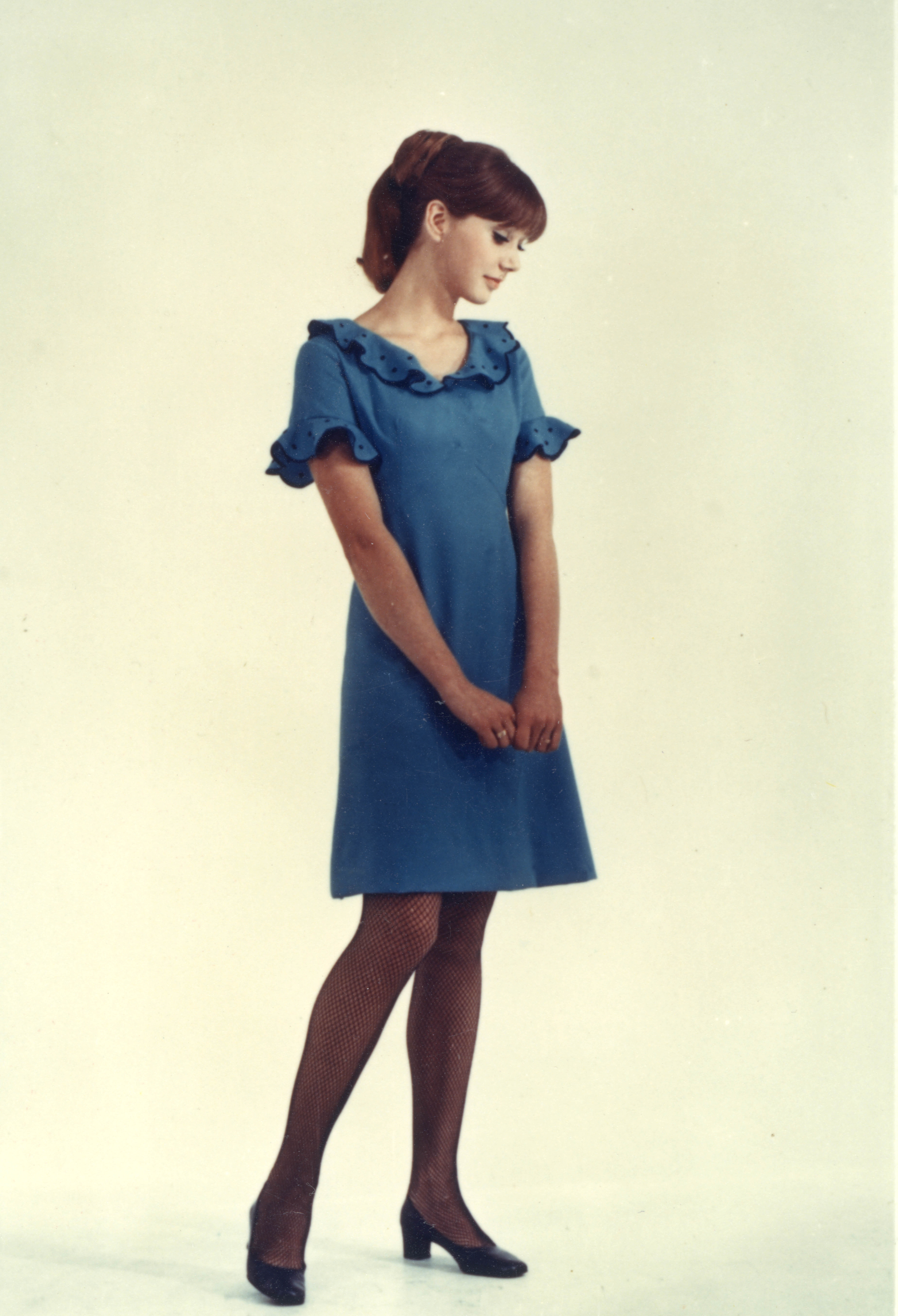
Pertegaz design for flight attendants on Iberia, 1968

Pertegaz opened his first establishment at the age of 25, during the Second World War. Among his first clients were General Franco's wife Carmen and their daughter.

In 1953 he debuted his collections in the United States, where he showed them in New York, Boston, Atlanta and Philadelphia. He became popular with American buyers.

In 1957, following the sudden death of Christian Dior, Pertegaz was proposed as his successor, but chose to remain in Spain rather than take up the role as head designer for Dior.

By the 1960s Pertegaz had a staff of 700 employed in workrooms in Madrid and Barcelona, and was considered the foremost couturier in Spain. In 1968 he designed uniforms for flight attendants on Iberia Airlines.

Famous clients included Ava Gardner, Jackie Kennedy and Audrey Hepburn. In 2004 Pertegaz designed the wedding dress for Letizia Ortiz's marriage to the future Felipe VI of Spain.

On 15 October 2010, a set of Spanish postage stamps was released featuring the work of Pertegaz.

== Death ==
Pertegaz died in Barcelona on 30 August 2014. José Ignacio Wert, the culture and education minister of Spain, made the announcement, paying tribute to Pertegaz's memory by declaring his name synonymous with elegance.
