= Yugoslavia in the Eurovision Song Contest 1971 =

- Eurovision Song Contest 1971
- Participating broadcaster: Jugoslavenska radiotelevizija (JRT)
- Country: Yugoslavia
- Selection process: Jugovizija 1971
- Selection date: 20 February 1971

Competing entry
- Song: "Tvoj dječak je tužan"
- Artist: Krunoslav Slabinac
- Songwriters: Ivica Krajač; Zvonimir Golob

Placement
- Final result: 14th, 68 points

Participation chronology

Yugoslavia was represented at the Eurovision Song Contest 1971 with the song "Tvoj dječak je tužan", composed by Ivan Krajač, with lyrics by Zvonimir Golob, and performed by Krunoslav Slabinac. The Yugoslav participating broadcaster, Jugoslavenska radiotelevizija (JRT), selected its entry through Jugovizija 1971.

== Before Eurovision ==
=== Jugovizija 1971 ===
The Yugoslav national final to select their entry, was held on 20 February at the Komunalni center Hall in Domžale, SR Slovenia. The hosts were Helena Koder and Ljubo Jelčić. There were 9 songs in the final, from three subnational public broadcasters. RTV Sarajevo and RTV Belgrade did not submit any songs that year. The winner was chosen by the votes of 10 juries in five cities and towns in each Yugoslav Republic, a total of 400 jurors. The winning song was "Tvoj dječak je tužan" performed by the Croatian singer Krunoslav Slabinac, written by Zvonimir Golob and composed by Ivan Krajač. He previously came 5th in the 1970 Yugoslav Final.

Final – 20 February 1971
R/O	Broadcaster	Artist	Song	Votes	Place
1	(Socialist Republic of Slovenia) RTV Ljubljana	Bele Vrane	"Od srca do srca"	1420	8
2	(Socialist Republic of Croatia) RTV Zagreb	Krunoslav Slabinac	"Tvoj dječak je tužan"	2010	1
3	(Socialist Republic of Macedonia) RTV Skopje	Esma Redžepova	"Malo, malo"	1880	3
4	(Socialist Republic of Slovenia) RTV Ljubljana	Ditka Haberl & Doca Marolt	"Pesem za otroka"	1309	9
5	(Socialist Republic of Macedonia) RTV Skopje	Senka Veletanlić	"Sončev tanc"	1445	7
6	(Socialist Republic of Macedonia) RTV Skopje	Saška Petkovska	"Svetot moj"	1545	5
7	(Socialist Republic of Croatia) RTV Zagreb	Zvonko Špišić	"Šal na plaži"	1890	2
8	(Socialist Republic of Croatia) RTV Zagreb	Pro arte	"Hej, ti slatka Lulu"	1702	4
9	(Socialist Republic of Slovenia) RTV Ljubljana	Majda Sepe	"Regrat"	1504	6

== At Eurovision ==
The contest was broadcast on TV Beograd, TV Ljubljana 1, TV Skopje and TV Zagreb.

Krunoslav Slabinac performed 15th on the night of the contest, following Portugal and preceding Finland. At the close of the voting the song had received 58 points, coming 14th in the field of 18 competing countries.

=== Voting ===
Points awarded to Yugoslavia
Score	Country
10 points	
9 points	
8 points	
7 points	Germany
6 points	Austria; France; Spain
5 points	Ireland; Italy; Norway
4 points	Monaco; Netherlands; Portugal
3 points	Finland; United Kingdom
2 points	Belgium; Luxembourg; Malta; Sweden; Switzerland

Points awarded by Yugoslavia
Score	Country
10 points	Monaco
9 points	
8 points	Italy
7 points	Germany; Spain
6 points	Finland; Portugal; Sweden; United Kingdom
5 points	France; Ireland; Netherlands
4 points	Austria; Luxembourg; Norway; Switzerland
3 points	Belgium
2 points	Malta
