= Portugal in the Eurovision Song Contest 1971 =

- Eurovision Song Contest 1971
- Participating broadcaster: Radiotelevisão Portuguesa (RTP)
- Country: Portugal
- Selection process: Grande Prémio TV da Canção Portuguesa 1971
- Selection date: 11 February 1971

Competing entry
- Song: "Menina do alto da serra"
- Artist: Tonicha
- Songwriters: Nuno Nazareth Fernandes; Ary dos Santos

Placement
- Final result: 9th, 83 points

Participation chronology

Portugal was represented at the Eurovision Song Contest 1971 with the song "Menina do alto da serra" (lit. "Girl from the top of the mountain"), composed by Nuno Nazareth Fernandes, with lyrics by Ary dos Santos, and performed by Tonicha. The Portuguese participating broadcaster, Radiotelevisão Portuguesa (RTP), selected its entry at the Grande Prémio TV da Canção Portuguesa 1971.

== Before Eurovision ==
=== Grande Prémio TV da Canção Portuguesa 1971 ===
Radiotelevisão Portuguesa (RTP) held the Grande Prémio TV da Canção Portuguesa 1971 at the Cinema Tivoli in Lisbon on 11 February 1971, hosted by Ana Maria Lucas and Henrique Mendes. Nine songs took part in the final. Jorge Costa Pinto conducted all the songs. The results were determined by a distrital jury, composed by three members, each had 5 votes to be distributed among the songs it intended to award, making a total of 15 votes per district.

Grande Prémio TV da Canção Portuguesa - 11 February 1971
R/O	Artist	Song	Votes	Place
1	Daphne	"Verde pino"	5	7
2	Tonicha	"Menina do alto da serra"	103	1
3	Intróito	"Palavras abertas"	13	5
4	Efe 5	"Rosa, roseira"	6	6
5	Hugo Maia de Loureiro	"Crónica de um dia"	26	4
6	Paulo de Carvalho	"Flor sem tempo"	69	2
7	Lenita Gentil	"Anda ver o sol"	2	9
8	Fernando Tordo	"Cavalo à solta"	42	3
9	Duarte Mendes	"Adolescente"	4	8

Detailed Distrital Jury Votes
R/O	Song	Aveiro	Beja	Braga	Bragança	Castelo Branco	Coimbra	Évora	Faro	Guarda	Leiria	Lisbon	Portalegre	Porto	Santarém	Setúbal	Viana do Castelo	Vila Real	Viseu	Total
1	"Verde pino"					3						1	1							5
2	"Menina do alto da serra"	11	7	1	9	2	1	6	1	12	4	10	5	8	8	3	2	3	10	103
3	"Palavras abertas"				1			1	5	1	1					1		3		13
4	"Rosa, roseira"								5										1	6
5	"Crónica de um dia"					3	12		1		4		1	2					3	26
6	"Flor sem tempo"	1	3	9	5	5	2	6		2	4	2	2	2	3	5	11	6	1	69
7	"Anda ver o sol"					2														2
8	"Cavalo à solta"	3	4	5					3		1	2	6	3	4	6	2	3		42
9	"Adolescente"		1					2			1									4

== At Eurovision ==
On the night of the final Tonicha performed 15th in the running order, following Netherlands and preceding Yugoslavia. At the close of the voting the song had received 83 points, coming 9th in the field of 18 competing countries, at the time Portugal's highest Eurovision finish.

The orchestra during the Portuguese entry was conducted by Jorge Costa Pinto.

Each country nominated two jury members, one below the age of 25 and the other above, who voted for their respective country by giving between one and five points to each song, except that representing their own country. All jury members were colocated at the venue in Dublin, and were brought on stage during the voting sequence to present their points. The Portuguese jury members were Pedro Albergaria and Luís Filipe Costa.

=== Voting ===
Points awarded to Portugal
Score	Country
10 points	Spain
9 points	
8 points	France
7 points	
6 points	Monaco; United Kingdom; Yugoslavia
5 points	Finland; Germany; Luxembourg; Netherlands; Norway
4 points	Austria; Belgium; Italy
3 points	Ireland; Malta
2 points	Sweden; Switzerland

Points awarded by Portugal
Score	Country
10 points	
9 points	Netherlands
8 points	Finland; Monaco
7 points	Germany; Spain; United Kingdom
6 points	Belgium; Luxembourg; Switzerland
5 points	Austria; France; Norway
4 points	Ireland; Yugoslavia
3 points	Italy; Sweden
2 points	Malta
