= Germany in the Eurovision Song Contest 1971 =

- Eurovision Song Contest 1971
- Participating broadcaster: ARD (Note: Arbeitsgemeinschaft der öffentlich-rechtlichen Rundfunkanstalten der Bundesrepublik Deutschland) – Hessischer Rundfunk (HR)
- Country: Germany
- Selection process: Artist: Internal selection Song: Ein Lied für Dublin
- Selection date: 27 February 1971

Competing entry
- Song: "Diese Welt"
- Artist: Katja Ebstein
- Songwriters: Dieter Zimmermann; Fred Jay

Placement
- Final result: 3rd, 100 points

Participation chronology

Germany was represented at the Eurovision Song Contest 1971 with the song "Diese Welt", composed by Dieter Zimmermann, with lyrics by Fred Jay, and performed by Katja Ebstein. The German participating broadcaster on behalf of ARD, Hessischer Rundfunk (HR), selected its entry through a national final, after having previously selected the performer internally. This was the second of Ebstein's three appearances for Germany at Eurovision and she became the second performer, after Margot Hielscher, to represent the country in successive years.

== Before Eurovision ==
=== Ein Lied für Dublin ===
The final was held at the TV studios in Frankfurt, hosted by Günther Schramm. Ebstein performed six songs and the winner was chosen by a 10-member jury, who each awarded between 1 and 5 points to each song. Blue screen technology was used for most of Katja Ebstein's performances. Only the winning entry "Diese Welt" was performed with the orchestra seen in the background.

After the second and the fourth song, short interval acts were performed by British dance troupe Pamela Devis Ballet. They presented choreographies to "In the Summertime" by Mungo Jerry and the Ramsey Lewis Trio's instrumental version of "The 'In' Crowd". After the final performance, the Rosie Singers, who had served as background ensemble for the six performances, sang a medley of three previous Eurovision Song Contest winning entries: "Alles und noch viel mehr" (German version of "All Kinds of Everything" by Dana, 1970), "Boom Bang-a-Bang" (German version of the 1969 UK winning entry by Lulu) and "La, la, la" (1968 winning entry by Massiel for Spain).

Final – 27 February 1971
R/O	Song	Total	Place
1	"Der Mensch lebt von der Liebe"	27	5
2	"Alle Menschen auf der Erde"	37	2
3	"Es wird wieder gescheh'n"	28	4
4	"Diese Welt"	43	1
5	"Ich bin glücklich mit dir"	25	6
6	"Ich glaube an die Liebe auf der Welt"	37	2

Detailed Jury Votes
R/O	Song	P. Fischer	E. Guttmann	K. Ludwig	G. Schmid	I. Stein	E. Friesch	H. Hirschmann	H. Wernstedt	K.D. Wulffen	E. Zalud	Total
1	"Der Mensch lebt von der Liebe"	2	4	2	3	4	2	4	3	2	1	27
2	"Alle Menschen auf der Erde"	3	3	5	2	5	2	3	5	5	4	37
3	"Es wird wieder gescheh'n"	2	2	4	3	3	3	2	3	3	2	28
4	"Diese Welt"	5	4	3	5	5	4	3	4	5	5	43
5	"Ich bin glücklich mit dir"	4	2	2	1	3	1	2	3	3	4	25
6	"Ich glaube an die Liebe auf der Welt"	4	5	1	4	4	3	5	4	4	3	37

== At Eurovision ==
On the night of the final Ebstein performed 5th in the running order, following Switzerland and preceding Spain. Like Ebstein's 1970 entry "Wunder gibt es immer wieder", "Diese Welt" had a more contemporary feel than most of its competitors and had an effective build from a relatively quiet verse into a rousing chorus, allowing Ebstein to show her vocal range. At the close of voting, under the new system being trialled for the first time in the 1971 contest, "Diese Welt" had received 100 points, placing Germany third of the 18 entries, matching Ebstein's placing in 1970, at the time Germany's highest Eurovision finish.

=== Voting ===
Points awarded to Germany
Score	Country
10 points	
9 points	
8 points	France; Spain
7 points	Belgium; Monaco; Portugal; Yugoslavia
6 points	Austria; Italy; Sweden; Switzerland; United Kingdom
5 points	Finland; Ireland; Malta; Netherlands
4 points	Norway
3 points	
2 points	Luxembourg

Points awarded by Germany
Score	Country
10 points	Monaco
9 points	
8 points	
7 points	Austria; Spain; Yugoslavia
6 points	Italy; Switzerland
5 points	France; Portugal; United Kingdom
4 points	Finland; Ireland; Netherlands; Sweden
3 points	Malta
2 points	Belgium; Luxembourg; Norway
