= United Kingdom in the Eurovision Song Contest 1971 =

- Eurovision Song Contest 1971
- Participating broadcaster: British Broadcasting Corporation (BBC)
- Country: United Kingdom
- Selection process: Artist: Internal selection Song: A Song for Europe 1971
- Selection date: 20 February 1971

Competing entry
- Song: "Jack in the Box"
- Artist: Clodagh Rodgers
- Songwriters: John Worsley; David Myers

Placement
- Final result: 4th, 98 points

Participation chronology

The United Kingdom was represented at the Eurovision Song Contest 1971 with the song "Jack in the Box", composed by John Worsley, with lyrics by David Myers, and performed by Clodagh Rodgers. The British participating broadcaster, the British Broadcasting Corporation (BBC), selected its entry through a national final, after having previously selected the performer internally.

As the 16th annual Eurovision Song Contest was being held in Dublin, the BBC were worried about the possible audience reaction to the British song due to the hostilities raging in Northern Ireland. They specifically selected a singer from Northern Ireland, Clodagh Rodgers, who was popular in both the United Kingdom and the Republic of Ireland, to ease any ill-feeling from the Irish audience. However, Rodgers still received death threats from the IRA for representing the United Kingdom.

== Before Eurovision ==
=== A Song for Europe 1971 ===
The British Broadcasting Corporation (BBC) held the national final on 20 February 1971 as part of the BBC1 TV series It's Cliff Richard!, presented by Cliff Richard. Clodagh Rodgers, a singer and actress from Northern Ireland, best known for her hit singles including, 1969 hits "Come Back and Shake Me" and "Goodnight Midnight" sang all the six finalists in the contest, having been internally selected by the BBC to represent the United Kingdom, in part due to worries as to what reaction the British artist would face at the contest in Dublin. Rodgers performed each song weekly, before showcasing all six in the Song for Europe edition of the Cliff Richard Show, followed by a repeat playback of all six performances. Due to a postal strike, viewers were unable to cast votes for the songs this year, so 8 regional juries, consisting of 10 jurors with just one vote each for their favourite song, were constructed from members of the public. These juries were located in Belfast, Birmingham, Bristol, Cardiff, Glasgow, London, Manchester, and Norwich.

A Song for Europe 1971 – 20 February 1971
R/O	Song	Songwriter(s)	Votes	Place
1	"Look Left, Look Right"	Alan Hawkshaw, Ray Cameron	6	5
2	"In My World of Beautiful Things"	Valerie Avon, Harold Spiro	12	4
3	"Jack in the Box"	John Worsley, David Myers	22	1
4	"Another Time, Another Place"	Mike Leander, Eddie Seago	6	5
5	"Wind of Change"	Brian Bennett, Mike Hawker	17	2
6	"Someone to Love Me"	Ernie Ponticelli, Gordon Rees	17	2

Regional voting results
R/O	Song	Belfast	Birmingham	Bristol	Cardiff	Glasgow	London	Manchester	Norwich	Total
1	"Look Left, Look Right"					1		4	1	6
2	"In My World of Beautiful Things"		1		4	2	2	2	1	12
3	"Jack in the Box"	1	1	4	1	6	4	3	2	22
4	"Another Time, Another Place"		2	1		1	1		1	6
5	"Wind of Change"	1	4	3	2		3		4	17
6	"Someone to Love Me"	8	2	2	3			1	1	17

=== Chart success ===
"Jack in the Box" was chosen as the winning song, with two songs tying for second place. Rodgers released a three-track maxi single (RCA 2066) which included both the second placed songs. RCA also released two standard 7-inch singles of the winner, with one of the runners-up "Someone to Love Me" (RCA 2068) or "Wind of Change" (RCA 2069) on the B-Side. The combined sales of the three singles took the song to No.4 in the UK singles chart; Rodgers last top 10 single in the UK. Later in the year, she released a fourth song from the final "Look Left, Look Right", together with the three already released tracks on the LP Rodgers and Heart. "Another Time, Another Place" was then included on the 1972 budget LP Clodagh Rodgers, after it had become a No.13 hit single for Engelbert Humperdinck. To date, only the fourth placed song "In My World of Beautiful Things" has never been officially released in any form.

== At Eurovision ==
"Jack in the Box" won the national final and went on to come 4th in the contest, behind Monaco, Spain and Germany. It was the first time since 1966 that the UK had not placed first or second.

Radio 1 DJ Dave Lee Travis provided the BBC Television commentary, whilst Terry Wogan began his long running commitments with Eurovision, providing the radio commentary for BBC Radio 1 listeners, and he would commentate for both radio and television for most years until 2008.

Each country nominated two jury members, one below the age of 25 and the other above, who voted for their respective country by giving between one and five points to each song, except that representing their own country. All jury members were colocated at the venue in Dublin, and were brought on stage during the voting sequence to present their points. The jury members from the United Kingdom were Jeremy Paterson Fox and Gay Lowe.

=== Voting ===
Points awarded to the United Kingdom
Score	Country
10 points	
9 points	
8 points	Belgium; France; Malta; Monaco
7 points	Ireland; Portugal
6 points	Finland; Norway; Switzerland; Yugoslavia
5 points	Germany; Netherlands; Sweden
4 points	Austria; Luxembourg
3 points	Italy
2 points	Spain

Points awarded by the United Kingdom
Score	Country
10 points	Finland
9 points	
8 points	Monaco
7 points	Norway; Spain
6 points	Belgium; Germany; Ireland; Italy; Luxembourg; Portugal; Switzerland
5 points	France; Netherlands; Sweden
4 points	
3 points	Austria; Malta; Yugoslavia
2 points	
