= Belgium in the Eurovision Song Contest 1971 =

- Eurovision Song Contest 1971
- Participating broadcaster: Belgische Radio- en Televisieomroep (BRT)
- Country: Belgium
- Selection process: Canzonissima
- Selection date: 6 February 1971

Competing entry
- Song: "Goeiemorgen, morgen"
- Artist: Jacques Raymond and Lily Castel
- Songwriters: Paul Quintens; Phil van Cauwenbergh

Placement
- Final result: 14th, 68 points

Participation chronology

Belgium was represented at the Eurovision Song Contest 1971 with the song "Goeiemorgen, morgen", composed by Paul Quintens, with lyrics by Phil van Cauwenbergh, and performed by Jacques Raymond and Lily Castel. The Belgian participating broadcaster, Dutch-speaking Belgische Radio- en Televisieomroep (BRT), selected its entry through a national final.

Raymond and Castel had not taken part in the national final, which was won by Nicole & Hugo performing the song. BRT called them as late replacements shortly before Eurovision, as Nicole had fallen ill and was unable to travel. Nicole & Hugo would represent Belgium in 1973.

== Before Eurovision ==
=== Canzonissima ===
Canzonissima was the national final format developed by Dutch-speaking broadcaster Belgische Radio- en Televisieomroep (BRT) which determined the song that would represent Belgium at the Eurovision Song Contest 1971. This was the 4th edition of Canzonissima, after previously being used to select BRT's 1963 and 1967 entry, and a 3rd season that ran between 1967 and 1968 but wasn't related to the Eurovision Song Contest. The competition consisted of nine semi-finals held between October 1970 and January 1971, and a final on 6 February 1971. All shows were held in the Amerikaans Theater in Brussels, and hosted by Jan Theys.

==== Format ====
Canzonissima 1971 consisted of nine semi-finals and a final. The original format had ten artists compete in each semi-final and the top three songs chosen by a jury, as well as the public's favourite, would appear again in the next semi-final, while the other artists would have to select new songs, but after one of the competing artists died after semi-final 2, the remaining seven semi-finals only had nine artists. For a song to qualify to the final, it would have to place top three with the juries, or win the public vote, three times. A song could qualify with any combination of these, for example, it could get top three with juries twice and win the public vote once and then qualify to the final

==== Competing entries ====
BRT shortlisted eight singers and two groups for Canzonissima 1971: Ann Christy, Kalinka, Micha Marah, Mary Porcelijn, Ron Davis, Joe Harris, Johan Stollz, Johnny White, Nicole & Hugo, and Kate's Kennel. A total of 58 songs competed in Canzonissima 1971.

Competing entries
| Artist | Song | Songwriter(s) | |
| Artist | Song | Composer(s) | Lyricist(s) |
|---|---|---|---|
| Ann Christy | "Dag vreemde man" | Willy Crombé | Mary Boduin |
| Ann Christy | "De kinderen rond mijn huis" | A. Delhaye, S. Kaesen | |
| Ann Christy | "Een droom nooit gedroomd" | Roland Thyssen, F. Vadyn | |
| Ann Christy | "Het lied is uit of moet het nog beginnen" | Tim Visterin | Leo Rozenstraten |
| Ann Christy | "n Kleine melodie" | Oscar Denayer, F. Vadyn | |
| Ann Christy | "'n Zilveren kooi" | Peter Laine | Ke Riema |
| Joe Harris | "Alles wordt oranje" | Mary Boduin, K. Vanes, Albimoor | |
| Joe Harris | "Anne Marie" | R. De Mon, P. Loland | |
| Joe Harris | "Jij bent mijn engel" | R. Dero | Ker Delva |
| Joe Harris | "Nooit weer" | R. Varner, L. Barey | Leo Rozenstraten |
| Joe Harris | "Sunny Girl" | R. Dero, Ker Delva | |
| Joe Harris | "Valdemosa" | Varner | Mary Boduin |
| Joe Harris | "Want je mist haar" | R. Dero | Mary Boduin |
| Johan Stollz | "Ballade voor Soraya" | Johan Stolle, Ker Delva, Henk André | |
| Johan Stollz | "Brugge" | Johan Stolle | Henk André |
| Johan Stollz | "Emigrant" | Johan Stolle, Ker Delva, E. De Backer | |
| Johan Stollz | "Er is altijd" | Johan Stolle, BDG | |
| Johan Stollz | "Eva" | Johan Stolle | Ker Delva |
| Johan Stollz | "Ik mis je" | Johan Stolle | Mary Boduin |
| Johan Stollz | "Melodie voor jou" | Rocco Granata | Leo Rozenstraten |
| Johan Stollz | "Zo ver van mij" | Johan Stolle, Will Ferdy, M. Mortier | |
| Johnny White | "De wereld blijft niet staan" | Peter Laine | Ke Riema |
| Johnny White | "Dromen zijn nog vrij" | Paul Quintens | Phil Van Cauwenbergh |
| Johnny White | "Je maakt me stapelgek" | Merino Costa, Franz André, Johnny White | |
| Johnny White | "Morgen is morgen" | Peter Laine, Johnny White | |
| Johnny White | "Te mooi om waar te zijn" | Peter Laine | Ke Riema |
| Johnny White | "Verloren hart, verloren droom" | Peter Laine | Ke Riema |
| Kalinka | "Canzonissima" | C. M. Peters, G. Bogaert | |
| Kalinka | "Een regenboog" | R. Mast, C. M. Peeters | |
| Kalinka | "Loop maar door" | King Williams, Greta Bogaert | |
| Kalinka | "Vroeg of laat" | Scott Bradford | G. Bogaert |
| Kalinka | "Wil je soms weten" | King Williams | Greta Bogaert |
| Kate's Kennel | "Ach matroosje" | Jean Blaute, Dré Baekelandt | |
| Kate's Kennel | "De tijd is rijp" | Jean Blaute, Dré Baekelandt | |
| Kate's Kennel | "De voetbalkampioen" | Jean Blaute, Dré Baekelandt | |
| Kate's Kennel | "Droom" | Jean Blaute, Dré Baekelandt | |
| Kate's Kennel | "Peloton… vuur!" | Jean Blaute, Dré Baekelandt | |
| Kate's Kennel | "Regenlied" | Clee Van Herzele, Dré Baekelandt | |
| Kate's Kennel | "Rock and Roll" | Jean Blaute, Dré Baekelandt | |
| Kate's Kennel | "Toen" | Jean Blaute, Dré Baekelandt | |
| Kate's Kennel | "Wij lopen te vlug voorbij" | Jean Blaute, Dré Baekelandt | |
| Mary Porcelijn | "Als je terugkomt" | Al Van Dam | Mary Boduin |
| Mary Porcelijn | "Hou je van mij?" | Al Van Dam | Valeer Van Kerkhove |
| Mary Porcelijn | "Lachen" | R. Dero | Valeer Van Kerkhove |
| Mary Porcelijn | "Requiem" | Mary Porcelijn, Sus Nyens | |
| Mary Porcelijn | "Weet je nog wie ik was" | Ann Gaytan, Mary Boduin | |
| Micha Marah | "Balabaloe" | K. Van Herck, T. Rendall | |
| Micha Marah | "Die ring" | A. Delhaye, Karel Van Herck | |
| Micha Marah | "Ik ben zeventien" | K. Van Herck, Joka | |
| Micha Marah | "Tamboerke (Parram… parram)" | Rudi Witt | Karel Van Herck |
| Nicole & Hugo | "A Song Is Born" | Freddy Sunder | Leo Rozenstraten |
| Nicole & Hugo | "Goeiemorgen, morgen" | Paul Quintens | Phil Van Cauwenbergh |
| Nicole & Hugo | "Ik wil een papieren man" | Jef Van den Berg | Leo Rozenstraten |
| Nicole & Hugo | "Ik wil met je mee" | R. Varner | Leo Rozenstraten |
| Nicole & Hugo | "Mijn hele leven" | Rocco Granata | Leo Rozenstraten |
| Nicole & Hugo | "Pak je koffers" | Paul Quintens | Phil Van Cauwenbergh |
| Ron Davis | "Katialinda" | Daviny, Jo Deensen | |
| Ron Davis | "Mona Lisa" | J. Deensen | Daviny |

==== Shows ====
===== Semi-finals =====
Voting in the semi-finals was done by two separate juries and postcard voting. The first jury was a professional jury made up of five members who each gave between 0 and 10 points to every song. The members of the professional jury were non-voting chairman Herman Verelst (head of entertainment at BRT), Jo Leemans (singer), Jos Boudewijn (radio producer), Anton Peters (actor and director), Staf Knop (author and actor), and Raymond Stuyck (journalist). The second jury was a 5-member jury formed by people from the music industry. The music industry jury voted during every semi-final but did not impact the selection for Eurovision and their goal was to choose 'the best Flemish song'. The music industry jury only voted on any new songs in a semi-final and qualified songs kept their scores from previous semi-finals. The members of the music industry jury were non-voting chairman Nest Van der Eyken (SABAM), Gaston Nuyts (composer and conductor), Gerd Mertens (conductor and organist), Vic Nees (composer), Jef Claessen (radio producer), and Armand Preud'homme (composer).

Since songs introduced in semi-final 9 could not get to top three with the juries or win the public vote three times and qualify for the final, the rules to qualify for the final were changed for semi-final 9. Songs had to receive at least the average number of points that every song that qualified to the final got in their last semi-final from the jury. The public vote winner also qualified to the final.

After the second semi-final, on 21 October 1970, Ron Davis was involved in a car accident and remained absent from Canzonissima 1971 until his death on 22 January 1971. His death was commemorated by the juries at the start of the ninth semi-final.

The seventh semi-final did not take place live and was instead pre-recorded because it took place during the Christmas holidays.

Qualified to final Advanced to following semi-final

Semi-final 1 – 3 October 1970
| R/O | Artist | Song | Jury | | Public | | Result |
| R/O | Artist | Song | Points | Place | Votes | Place | Result |
|---|---|---|---|---|---|---|---|
| 1 | Kalinka | "Wil je soms weten" | 28 | 4 | 6 | 10 | —N/a |
| 2 | Johnny White | "Je maakt me stapelgek" | 28 | 4 | 355 | 4 | —N/a |
| 3 | Nicole & Hugo | "Mijn hele leven" | 27 | 6 | 167 | 6 | —N/a |
| 4 | Johan Stollz | "Brugge" | 30 | 3 | 415 | 3 | Jury Qualifier |
| 5 | Ann Christy | "Dag vreemde man" | 35 | 1 | 142 | 7 | Jury Qualifier |
| 6 | Ron Davis | "Mona Lisa" | 23 | 9 | 321 | 5 | —N/a |
| 7 | Mary Porcelijn | "Lachen" | 31 | 2 | 11 | 9 | Jury Qualifier |
| 8 | Joe Harris | "Jij bent mijn engel" | 25 | 7 | 595 | 2 | —N/a |
| 9 | Kate's Kennel | "Peloton… vuur!" | 24 | 8 | 61 | 8 | —N/a |
| 10 | Micha Marah | "Tamboerke (Parram… parram)" | 20 | 10 | 1,070 | 1 | Public Qualifier |

Semi-final 2 – 17 October 1970
| R/O | Artist | Song | Jury | | Public | | Result |
| R/O | Artist | Song | Points | Place | Votes | Place | Result |
|---|---|---|---|---|---|---|---|
| 1 | Micha Marah | "Tamboerke (Parram… parram)" | 21 | 9 | 2,504 | 1 | Public Qualifier |
| 2 | Ron Davis | "Katialinda" | 24 | 8 | 571 | 5 | —N/a |
| 3 | Kate's Kennel | "Wij lopen te vlug voorbij" | 20 | 10 | 26 | 10 | —N/a |
| 4 | Joe Harris | "Sunny Girl" | 25 | 7 | 1,448 | 2 | —N/a |
| 5 | Kalinka | "Loop maar door" | 29 | 5 | 99 | 8 | —N/a |
| 6 | Johan Stollz | "Brugge" | 27 | 6 | 364 | 6 | —N/a |
| 7 | Ann Christy | "Dag vreemde man" | 39 | 1 | 603 | 4 | Jury Qualifier |
| 8 | Nicole & Hugo | "Ik wil met je mee" | 31 | 3 | 139 | 7 | Jury Qualifier |
| 9 | Mary Porcelijn | "Lachen" | 31 | 3 | 80 | 9 | Jury Qualifier |
| 10 | Johnny White | "Verloren hart, verloren droom" | 38 | 2 | 982 | 3 | Jury Qualifier |

Semi-final 3 – 31 October 1970
| R/O | Artist | Song | Jury | | Public | | Result |
| R/O | Artist | Song | Points | Place | Votes | Place | Result |
|---|---|---|---|---|---|---|---|
| 1 | Micha Marah | "Tamboerke (Parram… parram)" | 22 | 8 | 4,906 | 1 | Public Qualifier – Final |
| 2 | Kate's Kennel | "De tijd is rijp" | 21 | 9 | 25 | 8 | —N/a |
| 3 | Johnny White | "Verloren hart, verloren droom" | 39 | 1 | 484 | 3 | Jury Qualifier |
| 4 | Mary Porcelijn | "Lachen" | 32 | 3 | 115 | 5 | Jury Qualifier – Final |
| 5 | Ann Christy | "Dag vreemde man" | 39 | 1 | 92 | 6 | Jury Qualifier – Final |
| 6 | Joe Harris | "Anne Marie" | 28 | 6 | 687 | 2 | —N/a |
| 7 | Nicole & Hugo | "Ik wil met je mee" | 31 | 4 | 71 | 7 | —N/a |
| 8 | Johan Stollz | "Zo ver van mij" | 31 | 4 | 198 | 4 | —N/a |
| 9 | Kalinka | "Een regenboog" | 27 | 7 | 13 | 9 | —N/a |

Semi-final 4 – 14 November 1970
| R/O | Artist | Song | Jury | | Public | | Result |
| R/O | Artist | Song | Points | Place | Votes | Place | Result |
|---|---|---|---|---|---|---|---|
| 1 | Nicole & Hugo | "Ik wil een papieren man" | 17 | 8 | 99 | 6 | —N/a |
| 2 | Joe Harris | "Want je mist haar" | 29 | 3 | 118 | 4 | Jury Qualifier |
| 3 | Micha Marah | "Ik ben zeventien" | 29 | 3 | 3,474 | 1 | Jury & Public Qualifier |
| 4 | Johan Stollz | "Eva" | 15 | 9 | 299 | 2 | —N/a |
| 5 | Ann Christy | "Een droom nooit gedroomd" | 27 | 5 | 35 | 8 | —N/a |
| 6 | Kalinka | "Canzonissima" | 38 | 2 | 120 | 3 | Jury Qualifier |
| 7 | Kate's Kennel | "Droom" | 22 | 7 | 27 | 9 | —N/a |
| 8 | Johnny White | "Verloren hart, verloren droom" | 39 | 1 | 111 | 5 | Jury Qualifier – Final |
| 9 | Mary Porcelijn | "Hou je van mij?" | 23 | 6 | 73 | 7 | —N/a |

Semi-final 5 – 28 November 1970
| R/O | Artist | Song | Jury | | Public | | Result |
| R/O | Artist | Song | Points | Place | Votes | Place | Result |
|---|---|---|---|---|---|---|---|
| 1 | Kate's Kennel | "Regenlied" | 15 | 9 | 44 | 9 | —N/a |
| 2 | Johnny White | "De wereld blijft niet staan" | 30 | 5 | 77 | 6 | —N/a |
| 3 | Micha Marah | "Ik ben zeventien" | 27 | 7 | 4,319 | 1 | Public Qualifier – Final |
| 4 | Johan Stollz | "Er is altijd" | 26 | 8 | 94 | 4 | —N/a |
| 5 | Ann Christy | "'n Zilveren kooi" | 34 | 2 | 86 | 5 | Jury Qualifier |
| 6 | Mary Porcelijn | "Requiem" | 28 | 6 | 66 | 8 | —N/a |
| 7 | Joe Harris | "Want je mist haar" | 31 | 4 | 119 | 3 | —N/a |
| 8 | Kalinka | "Canzonissima" | 33 | 3 | 67 | 7 | Jury Qualifier |
| 9 | Nicole & Hugo | "Goeiemorgen, morgen" | 38 | 1 | 607 | 2 | Jury Qualifier |

Semi-final 5 – Detailed jury voting results
| R/O | Song | Raymond Stuyck | Staf Knop | Jo Leemans | Anton Peters | Jos Boudewijn | Total |
|---|---|---|---|---|---|---|---|
| 1 | "Regenlied" | 2 | 3 | 3 | 5 | 2 | 15 |
| 2 | "De wereld blijft niet staan" | 5 | 7 | 7 | 6 | 5 | 30 |
| 3 | "Ik ben zeventien" | 4 | 6 | 6 | 6 | 5 | 27 |
| 4 | "Er is altijd" | 2 | 6 | 8 | 4 | 6 | 26 |
| 5 | "'n Zilveren kooi" | 6 | 8 | 8 | 7 | 5 | 34 |
| 6 | "Requiem" | 4 | 6 | 5 | 7 | 6 | 28 |
| 7 | "Want je mist haar" | 5 | 5 | 7 | 7 | 7 | 31 |
| 8 | "Canzonissima" | 5 | 8 | 8 | 5 | 7 | 33 |
| 9 | "Goeiemorgen, morgen" | 6 | 8 | 8 | 8 | 8 | 38 |

Semi-final 6 – 12 December 1970
| R/O | Artist | Song | Jury | | Public | | Result |
| R/O | Artist | Song | Points | Place | Votes | Place | Result |
|---|---|---|---|---|---|---|---|
| 1 | Joe Harris | "Nooit weer" | 35 | 4 | 93 | 8 | —N/a |
| 2 | Kalinka | "Canzonissima" | 31 | 6 | 74 | 9 | —N/a |
| 3 | Ann Christy | "'n Zilveren kooi" | 34 | 5 | 96 | 7 | —N/a |
| 4 | Kate's Kennel | "Ach matroosje" | 0 | 9 | 921 | 2 | —N/a |
| 5 | Nicole & Hugo | "Goeiemorgen, morgen" | 43 | 1 | 662 | 4 | Jury Qualifier |
| 6 | Micha Marah | "Die ring" | 36 | 2 | 4,239 | 1 | Jury & Public Qualifier |
| 7 | Johnny White | "Morgen is morgen" | 31 | 6 | 848 | 3 | —N/a |
| 8 | Mary Porcelijn | "Als je terugkomt" | 36 | 2 | 136 | 6 | Jury Qualifier |
| 9 | Johan Stollz | "Ik mis je" | 30 | 8 | 358 | 5 | —N/a |

Semi-final 7 – 26 December 1970 (Pre-recorded)
| R/O | Artist | Song | Jury | | Public | | Result |
| R/O | Artist | Song | Points | Place | Votes | Place | Result |
|---|---|---|---|---|---|---|---|
| 1 | Johnny White | "Te mooi om waar te zijn" | 26 | 7 | 40 | 5 | —N/a |
| 2 | Ann Christy | "De kinderen rond mijn huis" | 31 | 5 | 14 | 8 | —N/a |
| 3 | Micha Marah | "Die ring" | 31 | 5 | 2,710 | 1 | Public Qualifier – Final |
| 4 | Johan Stollz | "Melodie voor jou" | 24 | 8 | 36 | 6 | —N/a |
| 5 | Kalinka | "Vroeg of laat" | 37 | 2 | 13 | 9 | Jury Qualifier |
| 6 | Nicole & Hugo | "Goeiemorgen, morgen" | 43 | 1 | 476 | 2 | Jury Qualifier – Final |
| 7 | Mary Porcelijn | "Als je terugkomt" | 37 | 2 | 134 | 3 | Jury Qualifier |
| 8 | Kate's Kennel | "Rock and Roll" | 16 | 9 | 50 | 4 | —N/a |
| 9 | Joe Harris | "Valdemosa" | 35 | 4 | 28 | 7 | —N/a |

Semi-final 8 – 9 January 1971
| R/O | Artist | Song | Jury | | Public | | Result |
| R/O | Artist | Song | Points | Place | Votes | Place | Result |
|---|---|---|---|---|---|---|---|
| 1 | Johan Stollz | "Ballade voor Soraya" | 33 | 6 | 4,345 | 2 | —N/a |
| 2 | Nicole & Hugo | "A Song Is Born" | 35 | 5 | 153 | 5 | —N/a |
| 3 | Joe Harris | "Alles wordt oranje" | 39 | 1 | 161 | 4 | Jury Qualifier |
| 4 | Kate's Kennel | "Toen" | 5 | 9 | 23 | 8 | —N/a |
| 5 | Micha Marah | "Balabaloe" | 28 | 7 | 4,371 | 1 | Public Qualifier |
| 6 | Mary Porcelijn | "Als je terugkomt" | 39 | 1 | 180 | 3 | Jury Qualifier – Final |
| 7 | Kalinka | "Vroeg of laat" | 38 | 3 | 19 | 9 | Jury Qualifier |
| 8 | Johnny White | "Dromen zijn nog vrij" | 38 | 3 | 61 | 6 | Jury Qualifier |
| 9 | Ann Christy | "Het lied is uit of moet het nog beginnen" | 24 | 8 | 33 | 7 | —N/a |

Semi-final 9 – 23 January 1971
| R/O | Artist | Song | Jury | | Public | | Result |
| R/O | Artist | Song | Points | Place | Votes | Place | Result |
|---|---|---|---|---|---|---|---|
| 1 | Ann Christy | "'n Kleine melodie" | 37 | 4 | 27 | 8 | —N/a |
| 2 | Nicole & Hugo | "Pak je koffers" | 36 | 5 | 678 | 3 | —N/a |
| 3 | Johnny White | "Dromen zijn nog vrij" | 35 | 6 | 28 | 7 | —N/a |
| 4 | Micha Marah | "Balabaloe" | 30 | 8 | 3,504 | 2 | —N/a |
| 5 | Mary Porcelijn | "Weet je nog wie ik was" | 42 | 2 | 99 | 4 | Jury Qualifier – Final |
| 6 | Kalinka | "Vroeg of laat" | 41 | 3 | 7 | 9 | Jury Qualifier – Final |
| 7 | Johan Stollz | "Emigrant" | 35 | 6 | 7,242 | 1 | Public Qualifier – Final |
| 8 | Kate's Kennel | "De voetbalkampioen" | 21 | 9 | 68 | 6 | —N/a |
| 9 | Joe Harris | "Alles wordt oranje" | 44 | 1 | 77 | 5 | Jury Qualifier – Final |

Semi-final 9 – Detailed jury voting results
| R/O | Song | Raymond Stuyck | Staf Knop | Anton Peters | Jo Leemans | Jos Boudewijn | Total |
|---|---|---|---|---|---|---|---|
| 1 | "'n Kleine melodie" | 5 | 7 | 9 | 9 | 7 | 37 |
| 2 | "Pak je koffers" | 7 | 9 | 7 | 7 | 6 | 36 |
| 3 | "Dromen zijn nog vrij" | 5 | 7 | 8 | 9 | 6 | 35 |
| 4 | "Balabaloe" | 6 | 4 | 5 | 7 | 8 | 30 |
| 5 | "Weet je nog wie ik was" | 6 | 6 | 10 | 10 | 10 | 42 |
| 6 | "Vroeg of laat" | 7 | 10 | 8 | 8 | 8 | 41 |
| 7 | "Emigrant" | 6 | 8 | 6 | 9 | 6 | 35 |
| 8 | "De voetbalkampioen" | 5 | 10 | 6 | 0 | 0 | 21 |
| 9 | "Alles wordt oranje" | 6 | 9 | 10 | 10 | 9 | 44 |

===== Final =====
The final took place on 6 February 1971 at 20:45 CET in the Amerikaans Theater in Brussels. Voting was by an "expert" jury of 11 members, which consisted of the five members of the professional jury in the semi-finals plus six journalists from Flemish newspapers, each giving one point to their favourite song. This turned out to be something of a non-event, as in the end, only three songs received any votes at all. "Goeiemorgen, morgen" performed by Nicole & Hugo was the choice of eight of the jury members.

During the final, it was also announced that "Als je terugkomt" performed by Mary Porcelijn was the winner of the music industry jury and earned the title of 'the best Flemish song', despite not gaining the most points from the music industry jury.

Final – 6 February 1971
| R/O | Artist | Song | Points | Place |
|---|---|---|---|---|
| 1 | Ann Christy | "Dag vreemde man" | 2 | 2 |
| 2 | Nicole & Hugo | "Goeiemorgen, morgen" | 8 | 1 |
| 3 | Joe Harris | "Alles wordt oranje" | 0 | 4 |
| 4 | Mary Porcelijn | "Lachen" | 0 | 4 |
| 5 | Micha Marah | "Tamboerke (Parram… parram)" | 0 | 4 |
| 6 | Johnny White | "Verloren hart, verloren droom" | 1 | 3 |
| 7 | Mary Porcelijn | "Als je terugkomt" | 0 | 4 |
| 8 | Mary Porcelijn | "Weet je nog wie ik was" | 0 | 4 |
| 9 | Kalinka | "Vroeg of laat" | 0 | 4 |
| 10 | Micha Marah | "Ik ben zeventien" | 0 | 4 |
| 11 | Micha Marah | "Die ring" | 0 | 4 |
| 12 | Johann Stollz | "Emigrant" | 0 | 4 |

Music Industry Jury Ranking
| Artist | Song | Result | Place |
|---|---|---|---|
| Nicole & Hugo | "A Song Is Born" | 36 | 1 |
| Mary Porcelijn | "Als je terugkomt" | 35 | 2 |
| Mary Porcelijn | "Weet je nog wie ik was" | 34 | 3= |
| Ron Davis | "Katialinda" | 34 | 3= |
| Ann Christy | "Dag vreemde man" | 32 | 5= |
| Mary Porcelijn | "Lachen" | 32 | 5= |
| Mary Porcelijn | "Hou je van mij?" | 31 | 7 |
| Johnny White | "Te mooi om waar te zijn" | 30 | 8= |
| Kalinka | "Vroeg of laat" | 30 | 8= |
| Ann Christy | "Een droom nooit gedroomd" | 29 | 10= |
| Ann Christy | "n Kleine melodie" | 29 | 10= |
| Ann Christy | "'n Zilveren kooi" | 29 | 10= |
| Johnny White | "De wereld blijft niet staan" | 29 | 10= |
| Johnny White | "Dromen zijn nog vrij" | 29 | 10= |
| Nicole & Hugo | "Goeiemorgen, morgen" | 29 | 10= |
| Joe Harris | "Alles wordt oranje" | 28 | 16= |
| Joe Harris | "Valdemosa" | 28 | 16= |
| Johan Stollz | "Ik mis je" | 28 | 16= |
| Kalinka | "Een regenboog" | 28 | 16= |
| Ann Christy | "Het lied is uit of moet het nog beginnen" | 27 | 20= |
| Johnny White | "Verloren hart, verloren droom" | 27 | 20= |
| Kalinka | "Wil je soms weten" | 27 | 20= |
| Kate's Kennel | "Wij lopen te vlug voorbij" | 27 | 20= |
| Nicole & Hugo | "Pak je koffers" | 27 | 20= |
| Johan Stollz | "Er is altijd" | 26 | 25= |
| Johnny White | "Morgen is morgen" | 26 | 25= |
| Kate's Kennel | "Droom" | 26 | 25= |
| Micha Marah | "Die ring" | 26 | 25= |
| Johan Stollz | "Melodie voor jou" | 25 | 29= |
| Kate's Kennel | "De tijd is rijp" | 25 | 29= |
| Mary Porcelijn | "Requiem" | 25 | 29= |
| Nicole & Hugo | "Mijn hele leven" | 25 | 29= |
| Ann Christy | "De kinderen rond mijn huis" | 24 | 33= |
| Joe Harris | "Want je mist haar" | 24 | 33= |
| Kalinka | "Loop maar door" | 24 | 33= |
| Nicole & Hugo | "Ik wil een papieren man" | 24 | 33= |
| Joe Harris | "Nooit weer" | 23 | 37= |
| Johan Stollz | "Ballade voor Soraya" | 23 | 37= |
| Kalinka | "Canzonissima" | 23 | 37= |
| Joe Harris | "Sunny Girl" | 22 | 40= |
| Johan Stollz | "Emigrant" | 22 | 40= |
| Kate's Kennel | "Peloton… vuur!" | 22 | 40= |
| Nicole & Hugo | "Ik wil met je mee" | 22 | 40= |
| Joe Harris | "Anne Marie" | 21 | 44 |
| Kate's Kennel | "Regenlied" | 20 | 45= |
| Micha Marah | "Ik ben zeventien" | 20 | 45= |
| Ron Davis | "Mona Lisa" | 20 | 45= |
| Johan Stollz | "Eva" | 19 | 48= |
| Johnny White | "Je maakt me stapelgek" | 19 | 48= |
| Johan Stollz | "Zo ver van mij" | 17 | 50 |
| Joe Harris | "Jij bent mijn engel" | 16 | 51= |
| Johan Stollz | "Brugge" | 16 | 51= |
| Micha Marah | "Tamboerke (Parram… parram)" | 16 | 51= |
| Micha Marah | "Balabaloe" | 13 | 54 |
| Kate's Kennel | "Ach matroosje" | 10 | 55 |
| Kate's Kennel | "Rock and Roll" | 5 | 56 |
| Kate's Kennel | "De voetbalkampioen" | 0 | 57= |
| Kate's Kennel | "Toen" | 0 | 57= |

== At Eurovision ==
Shortly before the Eurovision Song Contest 1971 final, however, Nicole had fallen ill and was unable to travel, so broadcaster BRT drafted in Jacques Raymond and Lily Castel as late replacements. Raymond had previously sung for Belgium in 1963. Nicole & Hugo would represent Belgium in 1973.

On the night of the final Raymond and Castel performed 10th in the running order, following the United Kingdom and preceding Italy. At the close of the voting "Goeiemorgen, morgen" had received 68 points, placing Belgium 14th of the 18 participating countries.

The contest was broadcast on BRT (with commentary by Anton Peters) and RTB (with commentary by Paule Herreman). It was also broadcast on radio stations BRT 2 Omroep Brabant (with commentary by Fred Braeckman) and RTB 1.

=== Voting ===
Points awarded to Belgium
| Score | Country |
|---|---|
| 10 points | |
| 9 points | |
| 8 points | |
| 7 points | |
| 6 points | Finland; Netherlands; Portugal; United Kingdom |
| 5 points | France; Monaco; Sweden |
| 4 points | Ireland; Norway; Switzerland |
| 3 points | Austria; Italy; Yugoslavia |
| 2 points | Germany; Luxembourg; Malta; Spain |

Points awarded by Belgium
| Score | Country |
|---|---|
| 10 points | Finland; Monaco |
| 9 points | |
| 8 points | United Kingdom |
| 7 points | Germany |
| 6 points | Norway; Sweden |
| 5 points | |
| 4 points | Malta; Portugal; Spain |
| 3 points | Austria; France; Ireland; Luxembourg; Switzerland |
| 2 points | Italy; Netherlands; Yugoslavia |
