= Ireland in the Eurovision Song Contest 1971 =

- Eurovision Song Contest 1971
- Participating broadcaster: Radio Telefís Éireann (RTÉ)
- Country: Ireland
- Selection process: National Song Contest
- Selection date: 28 February 1971

Competing entry
- Song: "One Day Love"
- Artist: Angela Farrell
- Songwriters: Donald Martin; Ita Flynn

Placement
- Final result: 11th, 79 points

Participation chronology

Ireland was represented at the Eurovision Song Contest 1971 with the song "One Day Love", written by Donald Martin and Ita Flynn, and performed by Angela Farrell. The Irish participating broadcaster, Radio Telefís Éireann (RTÉ), selected its entry through a national final. The song eventually finished in eleventh place in the international final held at the Gaiety Theatre, Dublin. This was Ireland's first time hosting the Eurovision Song Contest, following the country's first victory in 1970 with "All Kinds Of Everything", sung by 18-year-old Dana.

== Before Eurovision ==
=== National Song Contest ===
The seventh National Song Contest was held on Sunday 28 February 1971, and was broadcast live from the RTÉ Television studios in Dublin on RTÉ and RTÉ Radio, hosted by Mike Murphy, making his début presenting the Irish national final. The winning song was decided by 10 regional juries, each consisting of six members, throughout Ireland.

Sonny Knowles had previously participated in the Irish national final in 1966, and finished in last place with both of his songs failing to score a single point.

R/O	Artist	Song	Songwriter(s)	Points	Place
1	Red Hurley	"Going Away"	Anthony Bardon	12	2
2	Maureen Miller	"Éist Liom" ("Listen To Me")	Marcus MacDonald; Pádraig Ó Méalóid	4	5
3	Danny Doyle	"Words"	Triona O'Donnell	8	4
4	The Coterie	"Tic-Tic-A-Toc"	Michael Judge	9	3
5	Des Smyth	"The Sad Sound"	Joe Burkett	3	7
6	Sonny Knowles	"An Fhaid a Mhairim" ("As long as I live")	Teresa Parsons	0	8
7	Angela Farrell	"One Day Love"	Donald Martin; Ita Flynn	20	1
8	Brian Byrne	"An Sean Seanchaí" ("The Old Story Teller")	William (Clem) Quinn	4	5

Detailed Regional Jury Votes
R/O	Song	Carlow	Galway	Cork	Donegal	Tullamore	Ballina	Dublin	Waterford	Longford	Limerick	Total
1	"Going Away"	1		2	4	1				2	2	12
2	"Éist Liom"	1				1			1		1	4
3	"Words"	3	1				1	1		2		8
4	"Tic-Tic-A-Toc"		2		2	1		4				9
5	"The Sad Sound"					1				1	1	3
6	"An Fhaid a Mhairim"											0
7	"One Day Love"	1	3	2		2	5		5		2	20
8	"An Sean Seanchaí"			2				1		1		4

== At Eurovision ==
=== Voting ===
Noel Andrews commentated on RTÉ Television, and Kevin Roche on RTÉ Radio. Ireland, like the other 17 participating countries, sent two jury members to the venue to cast their votes in vision, awarding between 1 and 5 points to each song, with the exception of their own country's entry. The criteria was that one juror from each country had to be over 25 years of age while the other had to be under 25 years, with a gap of at least ten years between their ages. This was a new concept devised by the European Broadcasting Union. Three countries voted together and this process was repeated a further five times.

=== Voting ===
Points awarded to Ireland
Score	Country
10 points	
9 points	
8 points	
7 points	Austria; France
6 points	Malta; Monaco; United Kingdom; Italy
5 points	Spain; Netherlands; Yugoslavia
4 points	Germany; Portugal; Finland; Norway
3 points	Switzerland; Belgium
2 points	Luxembourg; Sweden

Points awarded by Ireland
Score	Country
10 points	
9 points	Monaco; Spain
8 points	
7 points	United Kingdom; Norway
6 points	Austria; France; Italy; Finland
5 points	Switzerland; Germany; Luxembourg; Netherlands; Yugoslavia
4 points	Malta; Belgium
3 points	Sweden; Portugal
2 points	
