= Netherlands in the Eurovision Song Contest 1971 =

- Eurovision Song Contest 1971
- Participating broadcaster: Nederlandse Omroep Stichting (NOS)
- Country: Netherlands
- Selection process: Artist: Internal selection Song: Nationaal Songfestival 1971
- Selection date: 24 February 1971

Competing entry
- Song: "Tijd"
- Artist: Saskia and Serge
- Songwriters: Joop Stokkermans; Gerrit den Braber

Placement
- Final result: 6th, 85 points

Participation chronology

The Netherlands was represented at the Eurovision Song Contest 1971 with the song "Tijd", composed by Joop Stokkermans, with lyrics by Gerrit den Braber, and performed by Saskia and Serge. The Dutch participating broadcaster, Nederlandse Omroep Stichting (NOS), selected its entry through a national final, after having previously selected the performers internally.

== Before Eurovision ==
=== Artist selection ===
Nederlandse Omroep Stichting (NOS) internally selected Saskia and Serge as its representatives for the Eurovision Song Contest 1971; it is widely thought that this was done in response to the 1970 national final in which the couple's song "Spinnewiel" was placed runner-up by the juries despite being the overwhelming favourite of the Dutch public.

=== Nationaal Songfestival 1971 ===
NOS held the national final on 24 February 1971 at its studios in Hilversum, hosted by Willy Dobbe. Saskia and Serge performed six songs and the winner was chosen by postcard voting; again it is believed that this method was employed so that there could be no complaints that the public's choice had been overruled by a handful of jury members.

Final – 24 February 1971
R/O	Song	Votes	Place
1	"Lente"	2,335	2
2	"Tijd"	2,866	1
3	"Bobby snobby baard"	2,282	3
4	"Zomernachtcantate"	589	6
5	"Die dag"	623	5
6	"Vandaag begint de toekomst"	1,674	4

== At Eurovision ==
On the evening of the final Saskia and Serge performed 14th in the running order, following Ireland and preceding Portugal. Saskia's performance was hampered by a microphone problem on the opening lines of the song, where her voice was inaudible and the audience and television viewers heard loud audio feedback. At the close of voting "Tijd" had received 85 points, placing the Netherlands joint 6th (with Sweden) of the 18 entries.

The Dutch conductor at the contest was Dolf van der Linden for the 13th and last time (in total, he conducted 18 songs, including few entries from other countries that did not send their own conductors in the contests hosted by the Netherlands).

Each participating broadcaster appointed two jury members, one below the age of 25 and the other above, who voted by giving between one and five points to each song, except that representing their own country. All jury members were colocated at the venue in Dublin, and were brought on stage during the voting sequence to present their points. One of the Dutch jury members was Jos Cleber.

Points awarded to the Netherlands
Score	Country
10 points	
9 points	Portugal
8 points	Norway
7 points	France
6 points	Austria; Finland; Monaco; Sweden
5 points	Ireland; Spain; Switzerland; United Kingdom; Yugoslavia
4 points	Germany
3 points	
2 points	Belgium; Italy; Luxembourg; Malta

Points awarded by the Netherlands
Score	Country
10 points	
9 points	France; Monaco; Sweden
8 points	
7 points	
6 points	Belgium; Spain
5 points	Germany; Ireland; Malta; Portugal; Switzerland; United Kingdom
4 points	Yugoslavia
3 points	Austria; Finland; Luxembourg
2 points	Italy; Norway
