= Spain in the Eurovision Song Contest 1971 =

- Eurovision Song Contest 1971
- Participating broadcaster: Televisión Española (TVE)
- Country: Spain
- Selection process: Artist: Pasaporte a Dublín; Song: Internal selection
- Announcement date: Artist: 30 December 1970; Song: 1 March 1971

Competing entry
- Song: "En un mundo nuevo"
- Artist: Karina
- Songwriters: Rafael Trabucchelli; Tony Luz

Placement
- Final result: 2nd, 116 points

Participation chronology

Spain was represented at the Eurovision Song Contest 1971 with the song "En un mundo nuevo", composed by Rafael Trabucchelli, with lyrics by Tony Luz, and performed by Karina. The Spanish participating broadcaster, Televisión Española (TVE), selected its performer through the competition Pasaporte a Dublín and, subsequently, the song internally once the national final was over. The song, performed in position 6, placed second out of eighteen competing entries with 116 points.

== Before Eurovision ==
=== Pasaporte a Dublín ===
Televisión Española (TVE) decided to produce Pasaporte a Dublín, a musical series in which some of the most popular singers in Spain would compete to go to the Eurovision Song Contest 1971. The broadcaster prepared a shortlist of twenty artists that were important at the time for their popularity, sales or quality; some of them refused to participate because of scheduling conflicts or other reasons, among them Marisol, Juan Pardo, Miguel Ríos, and Víctor Manuel. Ten candidates participated at the competition: Cristina, Júnior, Karina, Dova, Jaime Morey, Encarnita Polo, Concha Márquez Piquer, Los Mismos, Nino Bravo, and Rocío Jurado.

The series consisted of twelve shows that aired weekly from October 1970 to December 1970. The shows were produced at Prado del Rey in Pozuelo de Alarcón (Madrid). In the first show (17 October), hosted by Massiel and Julio Iglesias, the candidates were introduced to the audience. The ten following shows centered on one contestant each: the protagonist would host the show and sing several songs from their repertoire, while the rest of contestants would sing a song each related to a particular theme. The schedule was the following:

Date	Host	Theme
17 October 1970	Massiel and Julio Iglesias	Introduction show
24 October 1970	Cristina	Hits from international festivals
31 October 1970	Los Mismos	Songs from the Twenties
7 November 1970	Concha Márquez Piquer	Hits from Hispanic America
14 November 1970	Rocío Jurado	Movie songs
21 November 1970	Nino Bravo	The Beatles' music
28 November 1970	Encarnita Polo	Songs from the Forties
5 December 1970	Jaime Morey	Operettas from yesterday and today
12 December 1970	Júnior	Classical papers with modern beats
19 December 1970	Karina	Children's songs
26 December 1970	Dova	Christmas songs
30 December 1970	José Luis Uribarri	Results show

The final was held on 30 December 1970, hosted by José Luis Uribarri. The winner was decided by a jury panel, consisting of a member of the Sociedad General de Autores de España, a member of the Guild of Entertainment, a representative of the General Administration of Television and Broadcasting, and five additional chairs. Each member of the panel had to award a set of 10–1 points to the acts after each broadcast. Karina was declared winner, but the position in the ranking of the rest of candidates was not disclosed. Magazines Semana and Teleprograma published that Jaime Morey, who would be internally selected to represent Spain in 1972, came in second place, while Dova was third.

Despite the popularity of the program, the format of Pasaporte a Dublín was not used again by TVE to choose its entrant; in fact a national final was not organized again until 1976. The format is considered in Spain to be a precursor to reality singing competitions like Operación Triunfo in the 2000s.

=== Song selection ===
After winning Pasaporte a Dublín, TVE internally selected "En un mundo nuevo" for Karina. The song was composed by Rafael Trabucchelli, and had lyrics by Tony Luz. The title of the song was leaked on 19 February 1971. The song was released on 1 March.

== At Eurovision ==
The Eurovision Song Contest 1971 was held on 3 April 1971 at the Gaiety Theatre in Dublin, Ireland. Karina performed "En un mundo nuevo" sixth in the running order, following Germany and preceding France. She was accompanied on stage by Trío La La La as backing singers. The first verse of the song could not be heard, since the sound engineer did not open Karina's microphone until the second verse. Waldo de los Ríos conducted the event's orchestra performance of the Spanish entry. The song received 116 points, coming in second place.

TVE broadcast the contest in Spain on TVE 1 with commentary by Joaquín Prat.

=== Voting ===
Each participating broadcaster appointed two jury members, one below the age of 25 and the other above, with at least 10 years between their ages, who voted by giving between one and five votes to each song, except that representing their own country. All jury members showed their votes on screen during the voting sequence. The Spanish jury members were Noelia Alfonso, who was Miss Europe 1970, and Francisco Madariaga from TVE.

Points awarded to Spain
Score	Country
10 points	France; Monaco
9 points	Finland; Ireland
8 points	Malta; Norway
7 points	Germany; Portugal; United Kingdom; Yugoslavia
6 points	Netherlands; Sweden
5 points	Italy; Switzerland
4 points	Austria; Belgium; Luxembourg
3 points	
2 points	

Points awarded by Spain
Score	Country
10 points	Portugal
9 points	
8 points	Germany
7 points	
6 points	Italy; Yugoslavia
5 points	France; Ireland; Malta; Netherlands
4 points	Luxembourg
3 points	Finland
2 points	Austria; Belgium; Monaco; Norway; Sweden; Switzerland; United Kingdom
