= Luxembourg in the Eurovision Song Contest 1971 =

- Eurovision Song Contest 1971
- Participating broadcaster: Compagnie Luxembourgeoise de Télédiffusion (CLT)
- Country: Luxembourg
- Selection process: Song: Hei elei, kuck elei Artist: Internal selection
- Selection date: 10 January 1971

Competing entry
- Song: "Pomme, pomme, pomme"
- Artist: Monique Melsen
- Songwriters: Hubert Giraud; Pierre Cour

Placement
- Final result: 13th, 70 points

Participation chronology

Luxembourg was represented at the Eurovision Song Contest 1971 with the song "Pomme, pomme, pomme", composed by Hubert Giraud, with lyrics by Pierre Cour, and performed by Monique Melsen. The Luxembourgish participating broadcaster, the Compagnie Luxembourgeoise de Télédiffusion (CLT), selected its entry through a national final held on 10 February and, subsequently, the performer internally three days afterwards.

== Before Eurovision ==
=== Hei elei, kuck elei ===
Hei elei, kuck elei was a news programme broadcast on Sunday afternoons since 21 September 1969. It is known for being the first ever programme to be broadcast in the Luxembourgish language. On the 10 January 1971 episode, there was a segment dedicated to the selection of Luxembourg's Eurovision entry. The program, which changed its name to RTL Hei Elei in 1991, would also host the Luxembourgish national finals in 1989 and 1992.

The national final featured three singers and three songs. The three singers were Monique Melsen, Marie-Christine, and Fausti, but the titles of the two non-winning songs are unknown. After the show, the public was able to send in postcard votes for their favourite of the three songs, and on 13 January 1971, after the winning song had been decided, an internal jury decided which of the three singers should perform the song in Dublin. Details about the format of the national final are also unclear, it is unknown if all three artists performed all three songs for a total of nine entries, or if each song was only performed by one of the artists.

== At Eurovision ==
On the night of the final Monique Melsen performed 8th in the running order, following France and preceding the United Kingdom. At the close of voting "Pomme, pomme, pomme" had received 70 points, placing Luxembourg 13th of the 18 entries.

The Luxembourgish conductor at the contest was Jean Claudric.

Each participating broadcaster appointed two jury members, one below the age of 25 and the other above, who voted by giving between one and five points to each song, except that representing their own country. All jury members were colocated at the venue in Dublin, and were brought on stage during the voting sequence to present their points. The Luxembourgish jury members were Mady Heinen, a teacher from Differdange, and Michel Klein, a coadjutor from Diekirch.

Points awarded to Luxembourg
Score	Country
10 points	
9 points	
8 points	
7 points	Malta
6 points	Monaco; Portugal; United Kingdom
5 points	France; Ireland; Finland
4 points	Yugoslavia; Norway; Spain
3 points	Switzerland; Belgium; Netherlands; Italy
2 points	Germany; Austria; Sweden

Points awarded by Luxembourg
Score	Country
10 points	
9 points	
8 points	
7 points	
6 points	
5 points	Portugal
4 points	Spain; Monaco; United Kingdom
3 points	
2 points	Yugoslavia; France; Netherlands; Germany; Ireland; Switzerland; Sweden; Malta; Italy; Austria; Norway; Belgium; Finland
