= Norway in the Eurovision Song Contest 1971 =

- Eurovision Song Contest 1971
- Participating broadcaster: Norsk rikskringkasting (NRK)
- Country: Norway
- Selection process: Melodi Grand Prix 1971
- Selection date: 20 February 1971

Competing entry
- Song: "Lykken er"
- Artist: Hanne Krogh
- Songwriter: Arne Bendiksen

Placement
- Final result: 17th, 65 points

Participation chronology

Norway was represented at the Eurovision Song Contest 1971 with the song "Lykken er", written by Arne Bendiksen, and performed by Hanne Krogh. The Norwegian participating broadcaster, Norsk rikskringkasting (NRK), selected its entry through the Melodi Grand Prix 1971.

"Lykken er" marked Norway's return to Eurovision after their first of only two absences to date since their debut, when they were one of five countries to boycott the 1970 contest in protest at the four-way tie in 1969 and the fact that they (along with Finland and Sweden) considered that the voting system of the late 1960s tended to place the Nordic countries at a disadvantage.

== Before Eurovision ==
=== Melodi Grand Prix 1971 ===
Norsk rikskringkasting (NRK) held the Melodi Grand Prix 1971 on 20 February at its studios in Oslo, hosted by Jan Voigt. Twelve songs took part in the final, with the winner chosen by a 14-member public jury who each awarded between 1 and 5 points per song. Other participants included past and future Norwegian representatives Inger Jacobsen, Odd Børre, and Anne-Karine Strøm.

MGP - 20 February 1971
R/O	Artist	Song	Points	Place
1	Odd Børre and Jan Erik Berntsen	"Ironside"	48	2
2	Jan Høiland	"Fjell-låt"	38	6
3	Anita Hegerland	"Gi meg en sebra"	44	4
4	Anne Lise Gjøstøl	"Riv deg løs"	37	8
5	Dag Spantell	"Gi verden et smil"	44	4
6	Inger Jacobsen	"India"	30	12
7	Webe Karlsen, Dag Spantell and Geir Wenzel	"Vi vil tro det vi synger"	45	3
8	Anne-Karine Strøm	"Hør litt på meg"	32	10
9	Jan Erik Berntsen	"Enkel ord"	31	11
10	Gro Anita Schønn	"Maxi-midi-mini"	37	8
11	Odd Børre	"Optimisten"	38	6
12	Hanne Krogh	"Lykken er"	52	1

== At Eurovision ==
On the night of the final Krogh performed last in the running order, following Finland. At the close of voting "Lykken er" had picked up 65 points, placing Norway 17th of the 18 entries, ahead only of Malta.

Each participating broadcaster appointed two jury members, one below the age of 25 and the other above, who voted for their respective country by giving between one and five points to each song, except that representing their own country. All jury members were colocated at the venue in Dublin, and were brought on stage during the voting sequence to present their points. The Norwegian jury members were Sten Fredriksen and Liv Usterud.

=== Voting ===
Points awarded to Norway
Score	Country
10 points	
9 points	
8 points	
7 points	Ireland; United Kingdom
6 points	Belgium; Monaco
5 points	France; Portugal
4 points	Switzerland; Yugoslavia
3 points	Austria; Finland; Malta
2 points	Germany; Italy; Luxembourg; Netherlands; Spain; Sweden

Points awarded by Norway
Score	Country
10 points	Monaco
9 points	
8 points	Netherlands; Spain
7 points	
6 points	Finland; Sweden; United Kingdom
5 points	Austria; France; Italy; Portugal; Yugoslavia
4 points	Belgium; Germany; Ireland; Luxembourg; Switzerland
3 points	
2 points	Malta
