= Finland in the Eurovision Song Contest 1971 =

- Eurovision Song Contest 1971
- Participating broadcaster: Yleisradio (Yle)
- Country: Finland
- Selection process: National final
- Selection date: 13 February 1971

Competing entry
- Song: "Tie uuteen päivään"
- Artist: Markku Aro and Koivistolaiset
- Songwriter: Rauno Lehtinen

Placement
- Final result: 8th, 84 points

Participation chronology

Finland was represented at the Eurovision Song Contest 1971 with the song "Tie uuteen päivään", written by Rauno Lehtinen, and performed by Markku Aro and Koivistolaiset (sisters Anja and Anneli Koivisto). The Finnish participating broadcaster, Yleisradio (Yle), selected its entry through a national final.

== Before Eurovision ==
=== National final ===
Yleisradio (Yle) invited nine composers for the competition. One of them, Toivo Kärki declined the invitation. Yle had also planned to give invitations to Nacke Johansson Seppo Paakkunainen but for unknown reasons they eventually were not invited. The Finnish national final was held on 13 February 1971 at Yle's television studios in Helsinki, hosted by Eveliina Pokela and Reijo Salminen. The winner was chosen by a jury consisting of 30 people; 24 province representatives (two from each Finland's twelve provinces, one aged 18–25 and the other 25–60, with at least ten years' difference between their ages) and 6 music industry professionals. Each juror distributed their points between 1–5 points for each song.

Final – 13 February 1971
R/O	Artist	Song	Songwriter(s)	Points	Place
1	Liisa Tuutti	"Uusi viikko"	Jim Pembroke	79	4
2	Markku Aro and Koivistolaiset	"Tie uuteen päivään"	Rauno Lehtinen	123	1
3	Pepe Willberg	"1:1 000 000 (Yksi miljoonaan)"	Eero Koivistoinen; Hector	73	5
4	Jukka Kuoppamäki	"Uinu poikani vain"	Jukka Kuoppamäki	111	2
5	Cumulus	"Rajan takaa"	Esko Linnavalli; Pertti Reponen	99	3
6	Aarno Raninen and Carola	"Ei koskaan"	Aarno Raninen	70	6
7	Lasse Mårtenson	"Pilvilaulu"	Lasse Mårtenson	70	6
8	Arja Saijonmaa	"Talvilintu"	Eero Ojanen; Pentti Saaritsa	68	8

== At Eurovision ==
On the night of the final Markku Aro and Koivistolaiset performed 17th in the running order, following Yugoslavia and preceding Norway. The entry was conducted by Ossi Runne. At the close of voting, Finland picked up 84 points and placed 8th of the 18 entries.

Each country nominated two jury members, one below the age of 25 and the other above, who voted for their respective country by giving between one and five points to each song, except that representing their own country. All jury members were colocated at the venue in Dublin, and were brought on stage during the voting sequence to present their points. The Finnish jury members were Markku Veijalainen and Vieno Kekkonen.

=== Voting ===
Points awarded to Finland
Score	Country
10 points	Belgium; United Kingdom
9 points	
8 points	Portugal
7 points	
6 points	Ireland; Norway; Yugoslavia
5 points	
4 points	Austria; France; Germany; Malta; Monaco; Sweden; Switzerland
3 points	Netherlands; Spain
2 points	Italy; Luxembourg

Points awarded by Finland
Score	Country
10 points	
9 points	Spain
8 points	
7 points	Monaco
6 points	Belgium; Netherlands; United Kingdom
5 points	Germany; Luxembourg; Portugal
4 points	Ireland; Sweden; Switzerland
3 points	Austria; France; Malta; Norway; Yugoslavia
2 points	Italy
