= Hearts of Soul =

Dutch-Belgian musical group

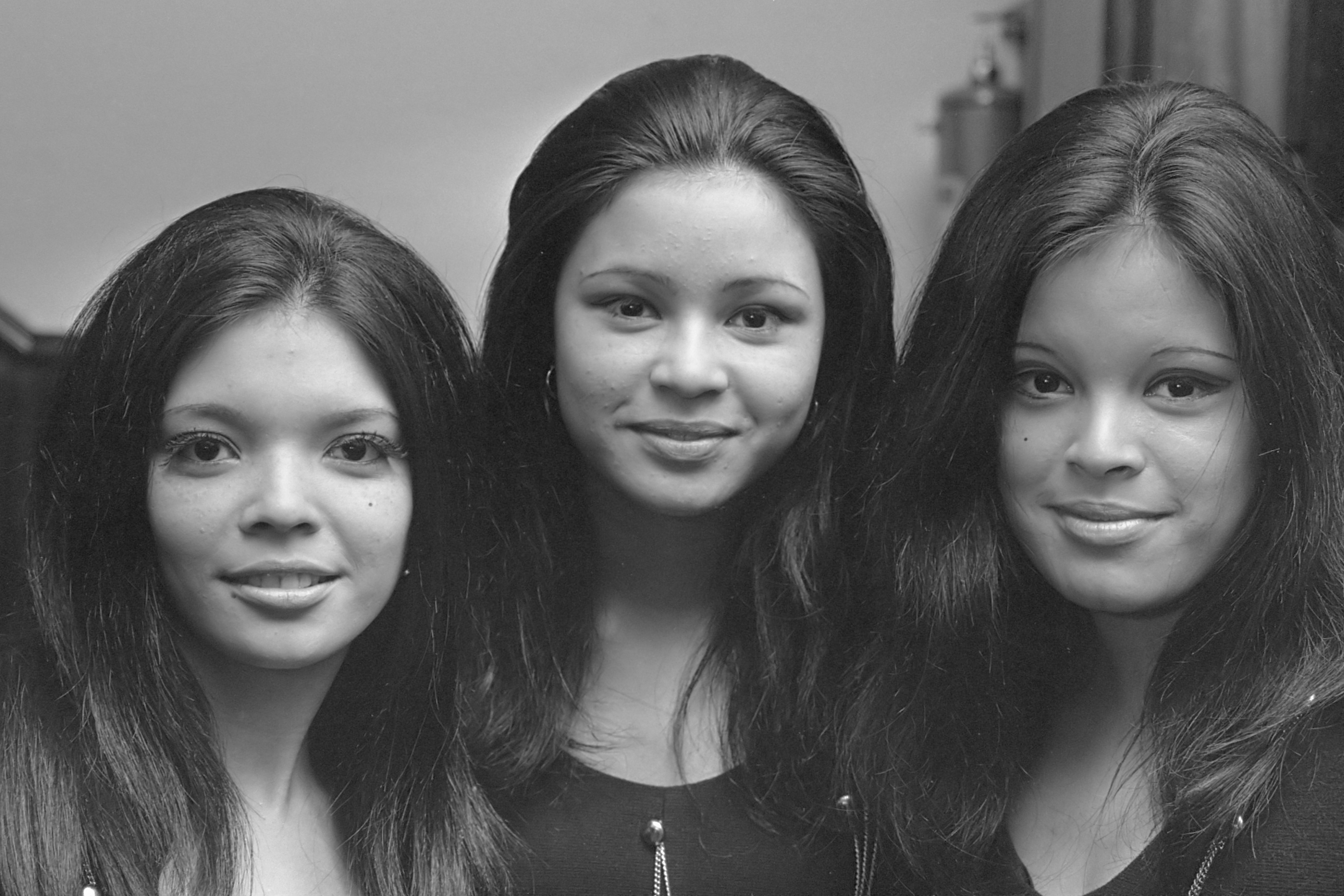
- Bianca, Patricia and Stella Maessen in 1970

Background information
- Also known as: Dream Express (1975–79), LBS (1979–81)
- Origin: Harderwijk, Netherlands
- Genres: Pop, disco
- Years active: 1969–81, 2010
- Past members: Bianca Maessen (1969–81, 2010); Stella Maessen (1969–81, 2010); Patricia Maessen (1969–78); Luc Smets (1975–81); Doreen Maessen (2010)

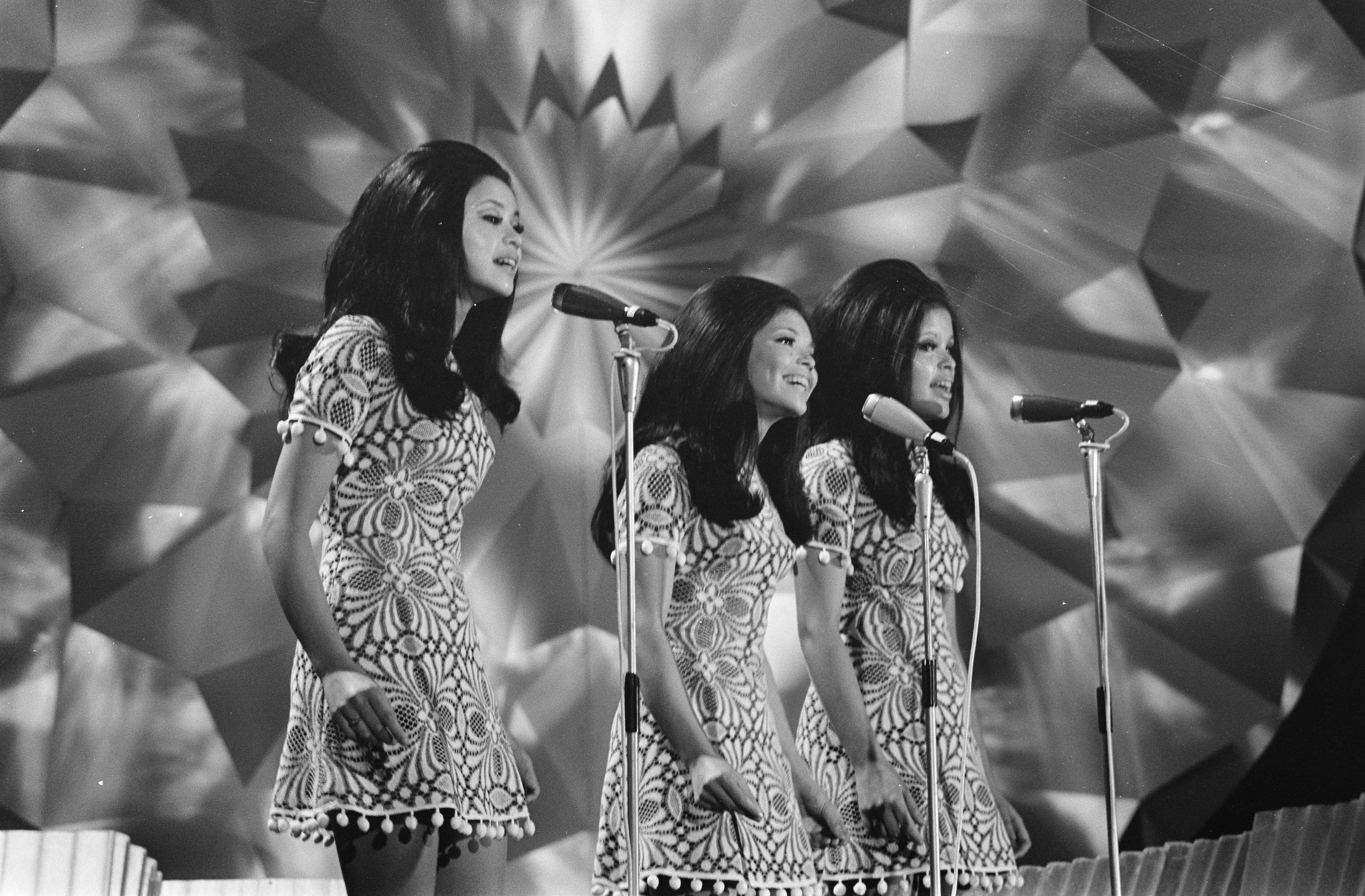
The Hearts of Soul at the Nationaal Songfestival in 1970

The Hearts of Soul, also known as Dream Express and LBS, were a Dutch-Belgian musical group that originally consisted of the Indonesian-born Dutch sisters Bianca (born 30 June 1950), Patricia (12 May 1952 – 15 May 1996) and Stella Maessen (born 6 August 1953). Belgian singer and composer Luc Smets joined the group in 1975. The group is known for representing the Netherlands in the Eurovision Song Contest 1970 and Belgium in the Eurovision Song Contest 1977.

== History ==
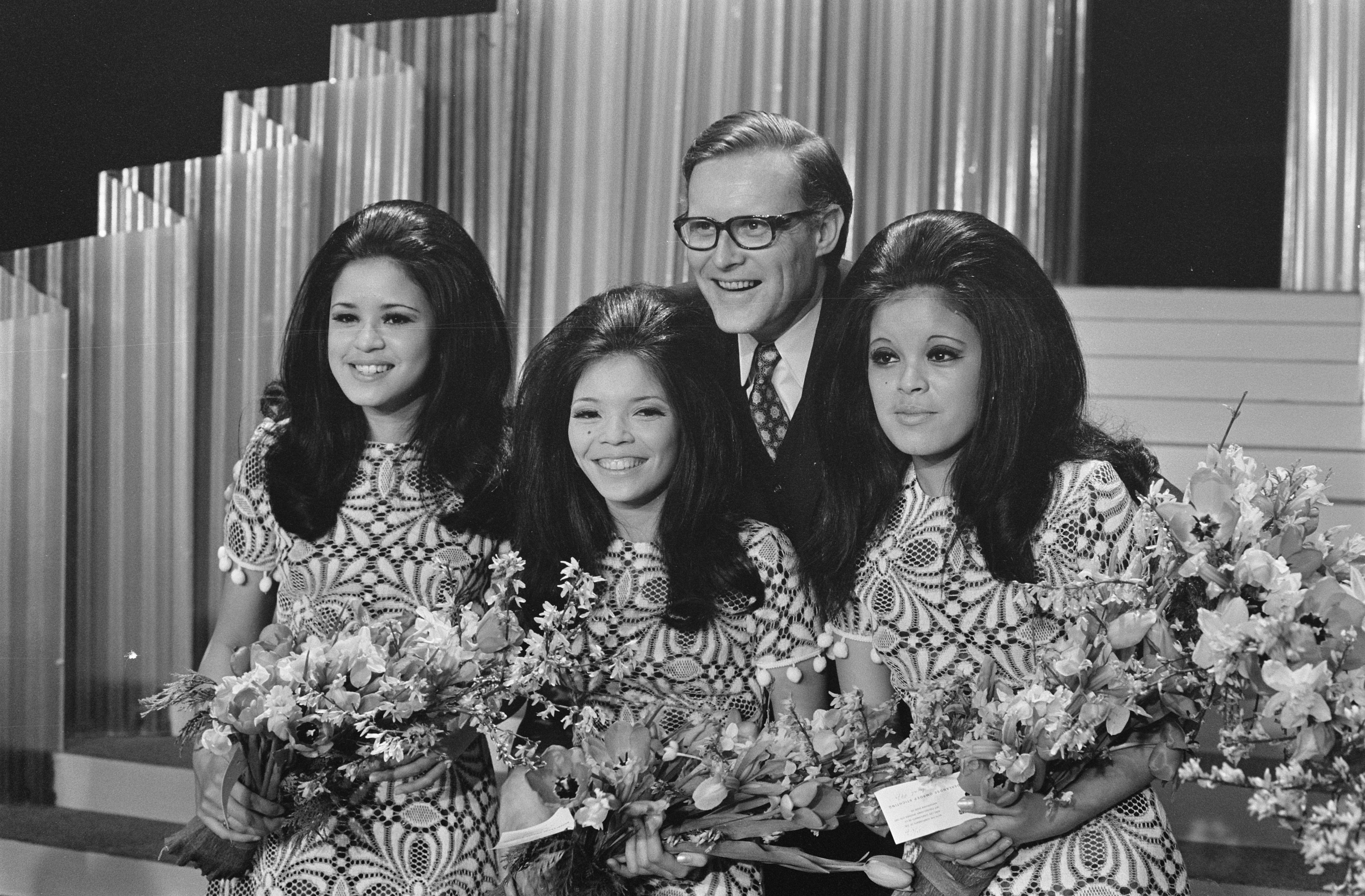
The Hearts of Soul and composer Pieter Goemans after winning the Nationaal Songfestival

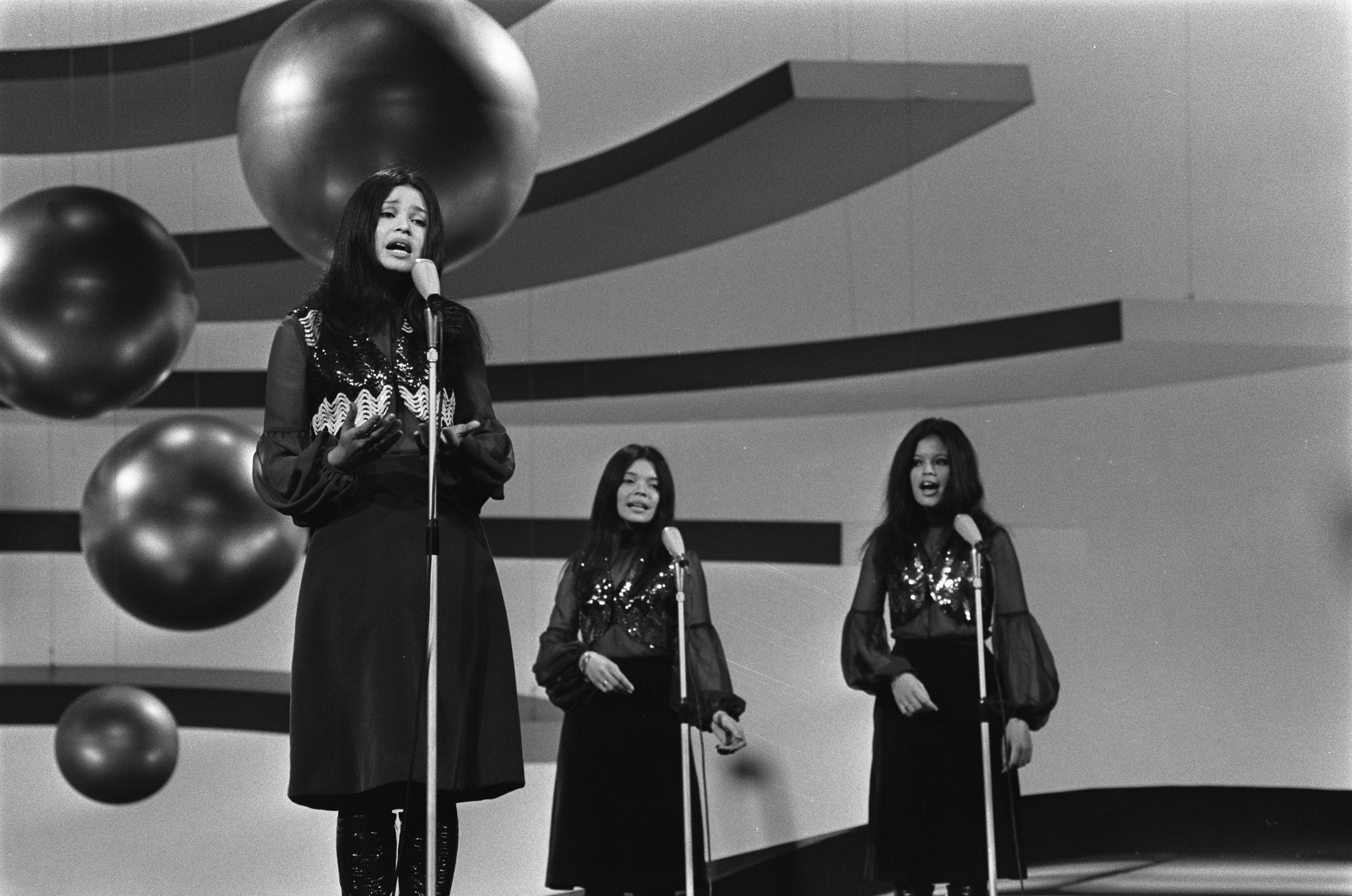
The Hearts of Soul at the Eurovision Song Contest 1970

=== Early career ===
The sisters Maessen started their career in 1969 as backing vocalists for Dutch singer Rob de Nijs at the Nationaal Songfestival, the Dutch national selection for the Eurovision Song Contest, performing the song "Zaterdagavondshow". Shortly after, the group released their debut single "Oh What a Price", followed by their debut album Hearts of Soul later that year.

In 1970, the group returned to the Nationaal Songfestival, this time with their own entry "Waterman", written by Pieter Goemans. They went on to win the competition, which gave them the right to represent the Netherlands in the Eurovision Song Contest 1970, held in Amsterdam. At the time, the rules of the Eurovision Song Contest did not allow groups to compete, so Patricia performed as a solo singer, while Bianca and Stella joined her on stage as backing vocalists. They received a total of seven points from the international juries, finishing seventh out of twelve participants.

From 1971 onwards, the sisters worked as session singers for several artists, including Dusty Springfield and Rika Zaraï. They also provided backing vocals for the Belgian singer Will Tura.

=== Success in Belgium ===
Bianca, Patricia and Stella moved to Antwerp in 1973, because there was more work for them in Belgium. In 1975, Bianca's boyfriend (and future husband) Luc Smets, a former member of the Belgian band The Pebbles, joined the group to form Dream Express. In the summer of 1976, their debut single "Dream Express" reached number two in the Flemish charts.

In 1977, they entered Eurosong, the Belgian national selection for the Eurovision Song Contest, with the songs "A Million in One, Two, Three", "Sold It for a Song" and "Spinning Top". Their entry "A Million in One, Two, Three" went on to win the final and was thereby chosen to represent Belgium in the Eurovision Song Contest 1977, held that year in London. This was the first time that Belgium entered the contest with a song that was sung entirely in English. The group received a total of 69 points, finishing in seventh place out of eighteen participating countries.

After Patricia decided to leave the group, Dream Express changed its name to LBS (an acronym for Luc, Bianca and Stella) in 1979. Their singles "LBS" and "Uncle Jim" received much airplay in 1979. The group broke up in 1981, due to the divorce of Luc and Bianca.

=== Solo careers ===
After the breakup of LBS, Bianca pursued a solo career, releasing singles throughout the 1980s.

In 1982, Stella released a solo album under the stage name Stella Mason. She represented Belgium in the Eurovision Song Contest 1982 with the song "Si tu aimes ma musique", reaching fourth place out of eighteen participants.

At the Eurovision Song Contest 1986, Patricia provided backing vocals for the winning entry "J'aime la vie", performed by Sandra Kim. In the 1987 edition, she was a backing vocalist for Plastic Bertrand, representing Luxembourg. Patricia Maessen died on 15 May 1996 in Mortsel, Belgium at the age of 44, from the effects of a stroke.

=== Comeback ===
In September 2010, the Hearts of Soul released the single "Suddenly You". The group now consisted of Bianca, Stella and younger sister Doreen Maessen.

== Discography ==
=== Singles ===
- "Oh What a Price" (1969)
- "Everybody Goes for Joe" (1969)
- "Fat Jack" (1970)
- "Waterman" (1970)
- "I Can Hear You Calling" (1971)
- "It's Great Fun" (1972)
- "Dream Express" (1976)
- "A Million in One, Two, Three" (1977)

== See also ==
- O'G3NE
- Anneke Grönloh
- Sandra Reemer

Awards and achievements
Preceded by Lenny Kuhr with "De troubadour"	Netherlands in the Eurovision Song Contest; 1970	Succeeded by Saskia & Serge with "Tijd"
Preceded by Pierre Rapsat with "Judy et Cie"	Belgium in the Eurovision Song Contest; 1977	Succeeded by Jean Vallée with "L'amour ça fait chanter la vie"
