= Sweden in the Eurovision Song Contest 1971 =

- Eurovision Song Contest 1971
- Participating broadcaster: Sveriges Radio (SR)
- Country: Sweden
- Selection process: Melodifestivalen 1971
- Selection date: 27 February 1971

Competing entry
- Song: "Vita vidder"
- Artist: Family Four
- Songwriter: Håkan Elmquist

Placement
- Final result: 6th, 85 points

Participation chronology

Sweden was represented at the Eurovision Song Contest 1971 with the song "Vita vidder", written by Håkan Elmquist, and performed by Family Four. The Swedish participating broadcaster, Sveriges Radio (SR), selected its entry through Melodifestivalen 1971.

SR did not compete in the Eurovision Song Contest 1970, as a protest against that four countries shared the victory the preceding contest. It was, however, back for the 1971 contest. SR held five semi-finals to select its 1971 entry, with the same three competitors in all of them, as part of the popular television show Hylands hörna. The group Family Four won all of the semi-finals, and therefore sung all the songs in the final. The song "Vita vidder", written by Håkan Elmquist, won and represented Sweden at Eurovision, held in Dublin.

== Before Eurovision ==
=== Melodifestivalen 1971 ===
Melodifestivalen 1971 was the selection for the 12th song to represent Sweden at the Eurovision Song Contest. It was the 11th time that Sveriges Radio (SR) used this system of picking a song. 1164 songs were submitted to SR for the competition. There were five semi-finals during the Hylands hörna show, hosted by Lennart Hyland. Family Four, Tommy Körberg, and Sylvia Vrethammar performed one song in each semi-final. Family Four won all five semi-finals, so all five finalists were performed by them. The final was held in the SR television studios in Stockholm on 27 February 1971 and was broadcast on TV1 but was not broadcast on radio.

=== Final ===
R/O	Song	Songwriter(s)	Points	Place
1	"Min sång"	Bengt-Arne Wallin; Anja Notini-Wallin	10	4
2	"Tjänare kärlek"	Peter Himmelstrand	17	2
3	"En sång om världen"	Anders Bergsjö; Göran Dalström	9	5
4	"Heja mamma"	Peter Himmelstrand	11	3
5	"Vita vidder"	Håkan Elmquist	22	1

== At Eurovision ==
Family Four finished 6th out of 18, scoring high points from Switzerland and the Netherlands.

Each participating broadcaster appointed two jury members, one below the age of 25 and the other above, who voted by giving between one and five points to each song, except that representing their own country. All jury members were colocated at the venue in Dublin, and were brought on stage during the voting sequence to present their points. The Swedish jury members were Eva Blomqvist and Putte Wickman.

=== Voting ===
Points awarded to Sweden
Score	Country
10 points	
9 points	Netherlands; Switzerland
8 points	
7 points	Austria
6 points	Belgium; Italy; Norway; Yugoslavia
5 points	France; United Kingdom
4 points	Finland; Germany; Malta; Monaco
3 points	Ireland; Portugal
2 points	Luxembourg; Spain

Points awarded by Sweden
Score	Country
10 points	Monaco
9 points	
8 points	
7 points	Italy
6 points	Germany; Netherlands; Spain
5 points	Belgium; United Kingdom
4 points	Austria; Finland; France; Switzerland
3 points	
2 points	Ireland; Luxembourg; Malta; Norway; Portugal; Yugoslavia
