= Switzerland in the Eurovision Song Contest 1971 =

- Eurovision Song Contest 1971
- Participating broadcaster: Swiss Broadcasting Corporation (SRG SSR)
- Country: Switzerland
- Selection process: Internal selection
- Announcement date: 10 February 1971 (artists); 27 February 1971 (song)

Competing entry
- Song: "Les Illusions de nos vingt ans"
- Artist: Peter, Sue and Marc
- Songwriters: Peter Reber; Maurice Tézé

Placement
- Final result: 12th, 78 points

Participation chronology

Switzerland was represented at the Eurovision Song Contest 1971 with the song "Les Illusions de nos vingt ans", composed by Peter Reber, with lyrics by Maurice Tézé, and performed by Peter, Sue and Marc. The Swiss participating broadcaster, the Swiss Broadcasting Corporation (SRG SSR), internally selected its entry for the contest.

== Before Eurovision ==
=== Internal selection and song change ===
The Swiss Broadcasting Corporation (SRG SSR) held an internal selection on 8 February. Songwriters, who were required to be of Swiss citizenship, were able to submit songs until 1 December 1970 to SRG SSR. In the first half of January, the directors of the three regional broadcasters of SRG SSR would shortlist the songs before deciding on the eventual participant.

The amount of rounds took place, compositions and participants, and shortlisted songs remain unknown. The regional juries ultimately selected Peter, Sue and Marc to compete with the song "Légendes de mon pays", composed by Peter Reber, with lyrics by Maurice Tézé.

For an unknown reason, "Légendes de mon pays" was withdrawn from the contest, with the song last being mentioned in newspapers on 27 February. On the same day, it was first reported that the trio would instead compete with the song "Les Illusions de nos vingt ans", composed by the same songwriters. The song was first performed at the Hits à Gogo program on 4 March, with further consistent reports of the song being referred to as the Swiss entry on 6 March and onward.

=== Releases ===
Peter, Sue and Marc would release "Les Illusions de nos vingt ans" and "Légendes de mon pays" on the same single in 1971. They would also release both songs in German ("Keiner Hat Gesagt" and "Jenes Land" respectively) and Spanish ("Las Ilusiones De Los 20 Años" and "Leyenda De Mi Pais" respectively) in other singles that same year.

In 1998, "Les Illusions de nos vingt ans" was featured in a CD compilation titled "Concours Eurovision De La Chanson 1956-1998: Schweizer Beiträge", which compiled every Swiss Eurovision entry at the time.

== At Eurovision ==
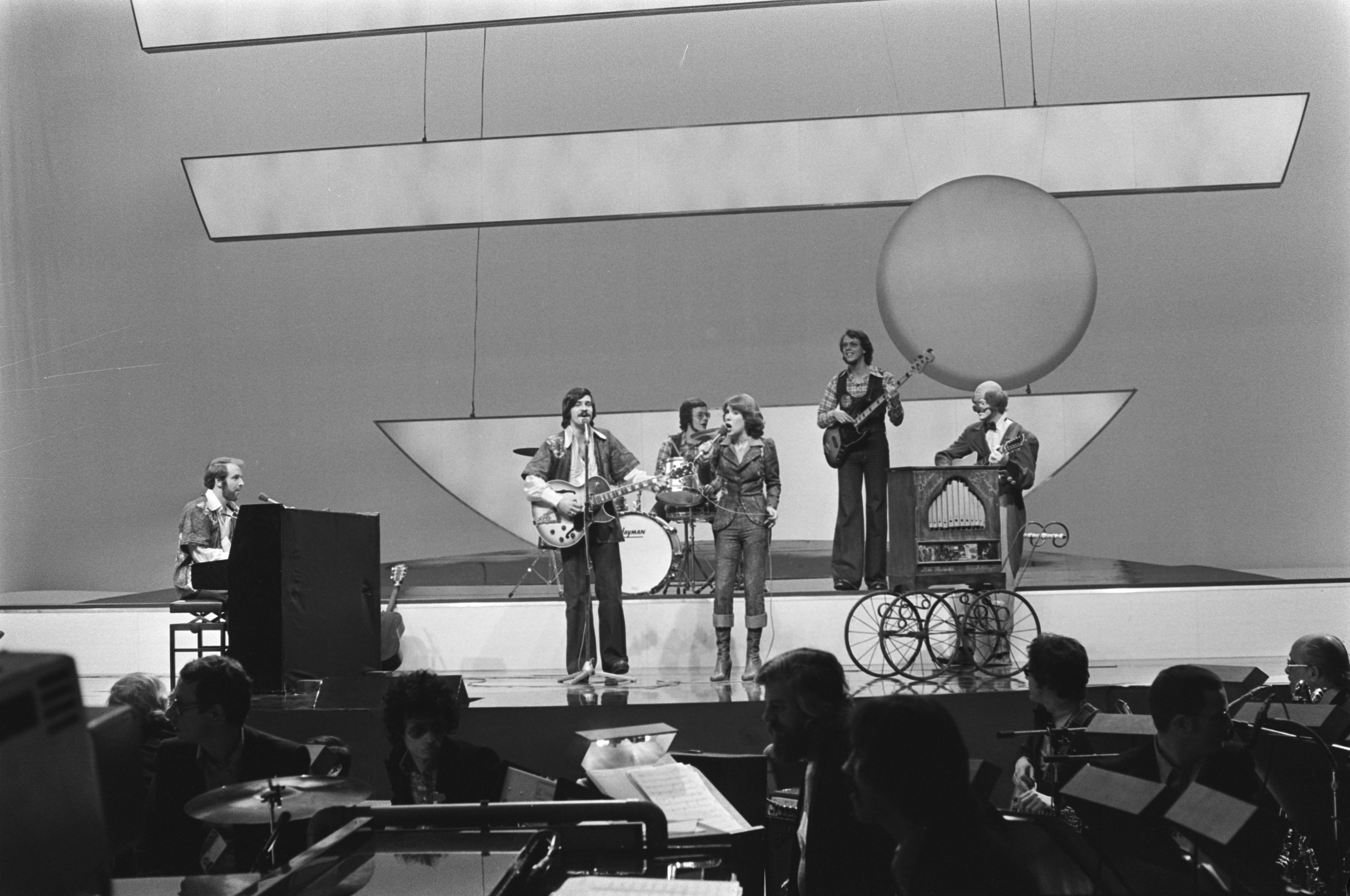
Peter, Sue and Marc (pictured in their 1976 participation) represented Switzerland in the Eurovision Song Contest 1971

At the Eurovision Song Contest 1971, held at the Gaiety Theatre in Dublin, the Swiss entry was the fourth entry of the night following Monaco and preceding Germany. The Swiss conductor at the contest was Hardy Schneiders. At the close of voting, Switzerland had received 78 points in total; finishing in twelfth place out of eighteen countries.

The contest was broadcast on SRG SSR via TV DRS (with commentary from Theodor Haller) and Radio Beromünster (Note: Delayed broadcast on 5 April 1971 at 22:30 (CET)) in German-speaking Switzerland, TSR (with commentary from Georges Hardy) in Romandy, and TSI in Ticino.

=== Voting ===
A new voting system was introduced in this edition, and was used annually until 1973. Each participating broadcaster appointed two jury members, one aged between 16 and 25 and one aged between 26 and 55, with at least 10 years between their ages. They each awarded 1 to 5 points for each song, other than the song of their own country. They cast their votes immediately after each song was performed and the votes were then collected and counted. For the public voting sequence after the interval act, the jury members were shown on the stage's screen with each lifting a signboard with the number between 1 and 5 for each song, as a visual verification of the scores they had awarded earlier. The two Swiss jurors who voted were Daniela Grigioni and Yvonne Borcard.

Points awarded to Switzerland
Score	Country
10 points	
9 points	
8 points	
7 points	Italy
6 points	France; Germany; Portugal; United Kingdom
5 points	Austria; Ireland; Malta; Netherlands
4 points	Finland; Monaco; Norway; Sweden; Yugoslavia
3 points	Belgium
2 points	Luxembourg; Spain

Points awarded by Switzerland
Score	Country
10 points	Monaco
9 points	Sweden
8 points	France; Italy
7 points	
6 points	Germany; United Kingdom
5 points	Netherlands; Spain
4 points	Belgium; Finland; Norway
3 points	Ireland; Luxembourg
2 points	Austria; Malta; Portugal; Yugoslavia
