= Encarnita Polo =

Spanish singer and actress (1939–2025)

- Born: Encarnación Polo Oliva; 22 January 1939; Seville, Spain
- Died: 14 November 2025 (aged 86); Ávila, Spain
- Other name: Encarna Polo
- Spouse: Adolfo Waitzman (m. 1969; div. 1978)

Encarnación Polo Oliva (22 January 1939 – 14 November 2025), better known as Encarnita Polo or Encarna Polo, was a Spanish singer and actress. Her signature songs were "Pepa Bandera" and "Paco, Paco, Paco".

== Early life and career ==
Born into a large family, she was the daughter of a confectioner who died when she was twelve, leaving her mother to care for eight children. Her love of music emerged very early: at ten, she won a radio contest, and at just twelve, she moved to Barcelona, where she began performing at parties and galas, thus launching her professional career.

Her artistic career took off in the 1960s. After appearing on Televisión Española (TVE) in 1963, she moved to Italy, where she worked with important figures in Italian music such as Claudio Villa and Gigliola Cinquetti. During this period, she made her film debut alongside Domenico Modugno in the musical comedy Scaramouche.

In 1967, she undertook an extensive tour of Latin America, which further strengthened her international presence. Upon her return to Spain, she married the Argentine composer Adolfo Waitzman on 22 August 1969. The couple had a daughter, Raquel, in 1970, and separated nine years later.

That same year, she participated in the TVE music competition Pasaporte a Dublín, its performer selection for the Eurovision Song Contest 1971. During the following decades, she continued performing, although her media presence gradually diminished. Among her most popular numbers are flamenco-pop songs like "Pepa Bandera", "Échale guindas al pavo" and, especially "Paco, Paco, Paco", a song that would eventually become her signature.

"Paco, Paco, Paco" experienced a notable resurgence in 2009 when a YouTube content provider used it as the backing track for a humorous sync-up with Beyoncé's "Single Ladies (Put a Ring on It)" video. The synchronization of image and audio generated a viral phenomenon with almost three million views, leading to the song's re-release and its peak at number 4 on the Spanish Top Music charts in April of that year.

On a personal level, Polo was one of the victims of the Bankia preferred shares fraud.

In 2010, she participated in the 1st Copla Week in Cáceres, in a round table discussion with Javier Remedios. The program, organized by Pilar Boyero, also included exhibitions, music therapy, film screenings, storytelling, and two gala performances.

In 2013, she once again became the focus of media attention when actress Llum Barrera impersonated her on the Antena 3 television show Tu cara me suena. The performance, with the song "Paco, Paco, Paco," won the corresponding gala and made the artist the most searched person on Google in Spain for several weeks.

== Death ==
Encarnita Polo died at a nursing home in Ávila, on 14 November 2025, at the age of 86. Police are investigating whether she was strangled by another elderly resident.
