= Saskia and Serge =

Dutch vocal duo

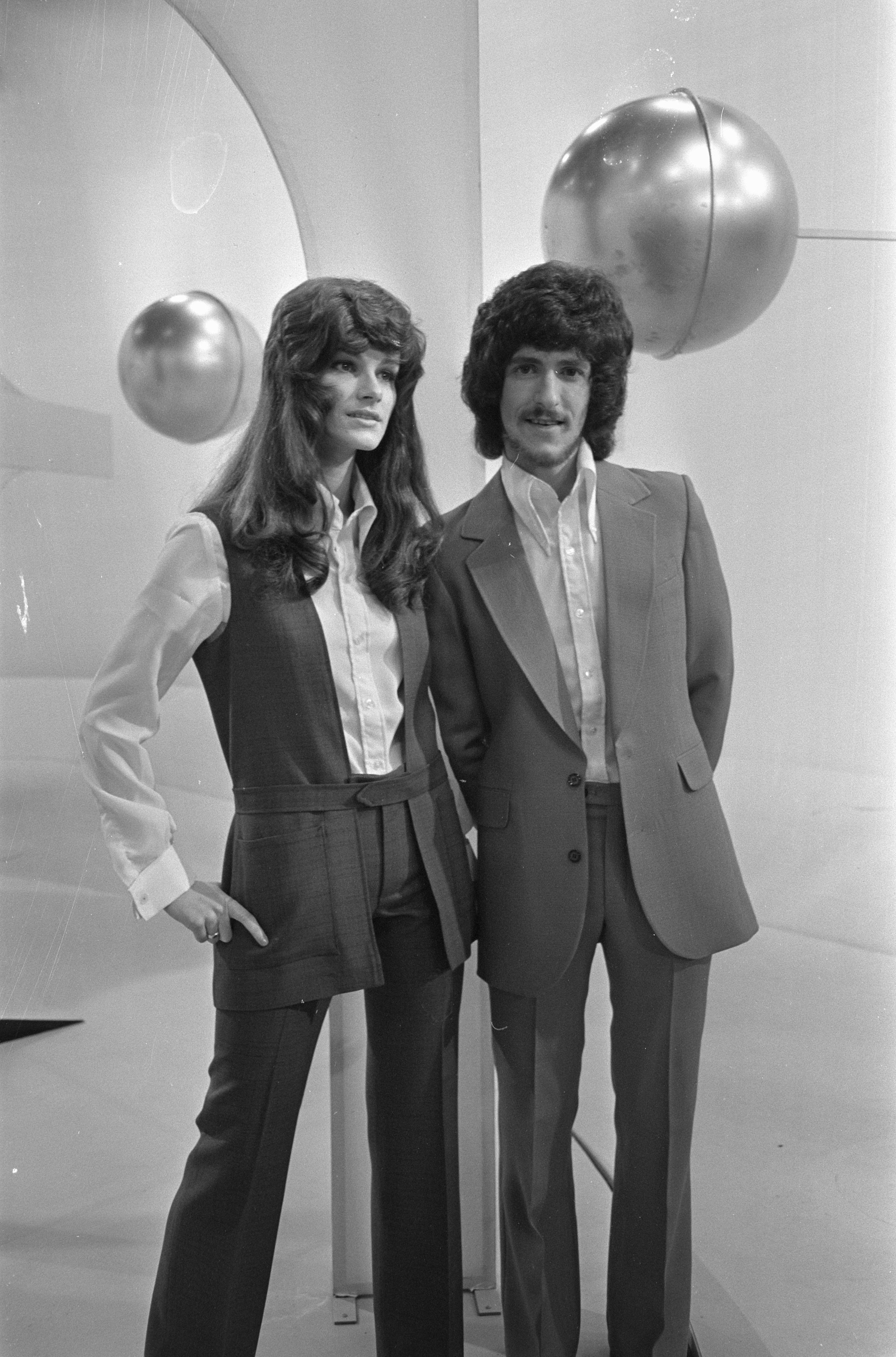
Saskia & Serge in 1971

Saskia & Serge are a Dutch vocal duo consisting of singer Trudy van den Berg (born 23 April 1947, Grootebroek) and singer-guitarist Ruud Schaap (born 22 March 1946, Den Helder). They are known for their participation in the 1971 Eurovision Song Contest, and have enjoyed a long and successful career in their native Netherlands, where they were awarded the title of Knights of the Order of Orange-Nassau in 2004.

== Early career ==
Van den Berg and Schaap first attracted attention when, as Trudy & Ruud, they won a talent contest organised by singer Max van Praag in 1967. The couple married in 1969 and changed their professional name to Saskia & Serge, as their gentle, folksy style began to attract favourable attention.

== Eurovision Song Contest ==
In 1970, Saskia & Serge took part in the Dutch Eurovision selection with "Het spinnewiel" ("The Spinning-Wheel"), which was narrowly and controversially beaten into second place. They returned in 1971, this time singing all six songs in the selection, and "Tijd" ("Time") was chosen to go forward to the 16th Eurovision Song Contest, held in Dublin on 3 April. Although Saskia suffered a microphone malfunction at the start of the song, "Tijd" finished in joint sixth place of the 18 entries.

== Later career ==
After releasing several folk-themed albums to a largely indifferent response Saskia & Serge changed direction in 1976 by releasing a successful country music-style album, We'll Give You Everything, the title track from which was a top 10 hit in The Netherlands. The album got them noticed outside the Netherlands, and they became the first Dutch artists to appear at the Grand Ole Opry in Nashville. Further hit singles followed, including "Mama, He's a Soldier Now" which became their biggest hit, peaking at No. 6 in 1980.

Saskia & Serge have continued to release popular albums of both original material and cover versions. Their fifteenth studio album, Mooie liedjes, was released in December 2008, consisting of adaptations of well-known Dutch songs.

Awards and achievements
Preceded by Hearts of Soul with "Waterman"	Netherlands in the Eurovision Song Contest; 1971	Succeeded by Sandra & Andres with "Als het om de liefde gaat"
