= Kićo Slabinac =

Croatian pop singer (1944–2020)

Krunoslav Slabinac
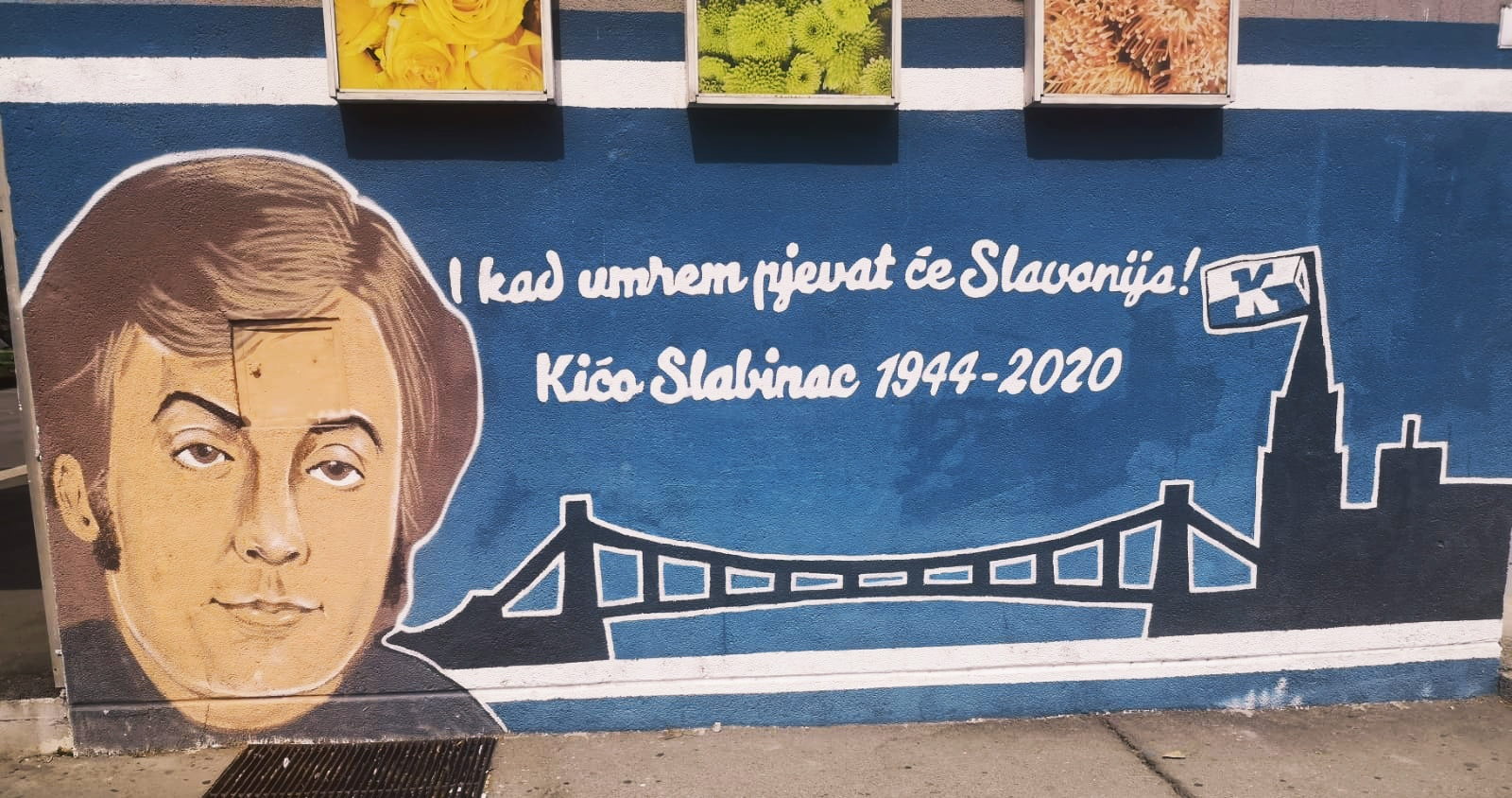
- mural in Osijek
- Born: 28 March 1944; Osijek, Independent State of Croatia
- Died: 13 November 2020 (aged 76); Zagreb, Croatia
- Occupations: Musician; composer; arranger
- Years active: 1960s–2020
- Musical career
- Genres: Rock; pop; folk
- Instruments: Vocals; guitar
- Labels: Jugoton; Croatia Records

Krunoslav "Kićo" Slabinac (28 March 1944 – 13 November 2020) was a Croatian pop singer. His specialties were modern songs inspired by folk music of Slavonia region of Croatia, and the uses of traditional instruments such as the tamburica.

In the 1960s Slabinac was a member of several rock'n'roll bands. He then opted for a solo career as a pop singer and moved to Zagreb. While performing in a club, he was noticed by Nikica Kalogjera who gave him a chance to appear as a newcomer at the 1969 Split Festival. A year later, in 1970, Slabinac won the first prize at the Opatija Festival. He represented Yugoslavia at the Eurovision Song Contest 1971 with "Tvoj dječak je tužan", placing 14th.

Slabinac's song "Zbog jedne divne crne žene" was a huge hit which solidified his status as a singer. However, in the 1970s, legal troubles and time spent abroad set back his career. After his return from the United States, Slabinac focused on folk music, although he remained active in the pop music scene.

His song "Letaj mi" became an evergreen in Macedonia, particularly because it was sung in Macedonian on the festival "MakFest" in 1989.

He died on 13 November 2020 in Zagreb, following a long and complicated illness.

== Discography ==
- 1971 – Tvoj dječak je tužan
- 1975 – Hej bećari
- 1978 – Pusti noćas svoje kose
- 1979 – Seoska sam lola
- 1984 – Krunoslav Slabinac
- 1984 – Christmas with Kićo
- 1985 – Stani suzo
- 1986 – Da l' se sjećaš
- 1987 – Oj, garava, garava
- 1988 – Tiho, tiho uspomeno
- 1991 – Za tebe
- 1995 – Ako zora ne svane
- 1995 – Sve najbolje
- 2006 – Zlatna kolekcija
- 2008 – Dignite čaše svatovi
- 2015 – 50 originalnih pjesama

Preceded by Eva Sršen	Yugoslavia in the Eurovision Song Contest; 1971	Succeeded by Tereza Kesovija
