= Eurovision Song Contest 1971 =

International song competition

Coordinates: 53.340312°N 6.261601°W

Date and venue
- Final: 3 April 1971
- Venue: Gaiety Theatre; Dublin, Ireland

Organisation
- Organiser: European Broadcasting Union (EBU)
- Scrutineer: Clifford Brown

Production
- Host broadcaster: Radio Telefís Éireann (RTÉ)
- Director: Tom McGrath
- Musical director: Colman Pearce
- Presenter: Bernadette Ní Ghallchóir

Participants
- Number of entries: 18
- Debuting countries: Malta
- Returning countries: Austria; Finland; Norway; Portugal; Sweden
- Participation map: Competing countries Countries that participated in the past but not in 1971

Vote
- Voting system: Two-member juries from each country; each juror scored each song between one and five
- Winning song: Monaco "Un banc, un arbre, une rue"

The Eurovision Song Contest 1971 was the 16th edition of the Eurovision Song Contest, held on 3 April 1971 at the Gaiety Theatre in Dublin, Ireland, and presented by Bernadette Ní Ghallchóir. It was organised by the European Broadcasting Union (EBU) and host broadcaster Radio Telefís Éireann (RTÉ), who staged the event after winning the 1970 contest for Ireland with the song "All Kinds of Everything" by Dana.

Broadcasters from eighteen countries participated in the contest, equalling the record of the 1965 and 1966 editions. Austria returned after their two-year absence, while Finland, Norway, Portugal, and Sweden all returned after having boycotted the competition the previous year. On the other hand, Malta competed for the first time.

The winner was Monaco with the song "Un banc, un arbre, une rue", performed by Séverine, written by Yves Dessca, and composed by Jean-Pierre Bourtayre. This was Monaco's first and only victory in the contest. Spain, Germany, the United Kingdom and Italy rounded out the top five. Finishing in last place, Malta had the worst result of a debut entry in twelve years.

This was the only time in the contest's history, where the second and third-placed entrants were also awarded.

== Location ==
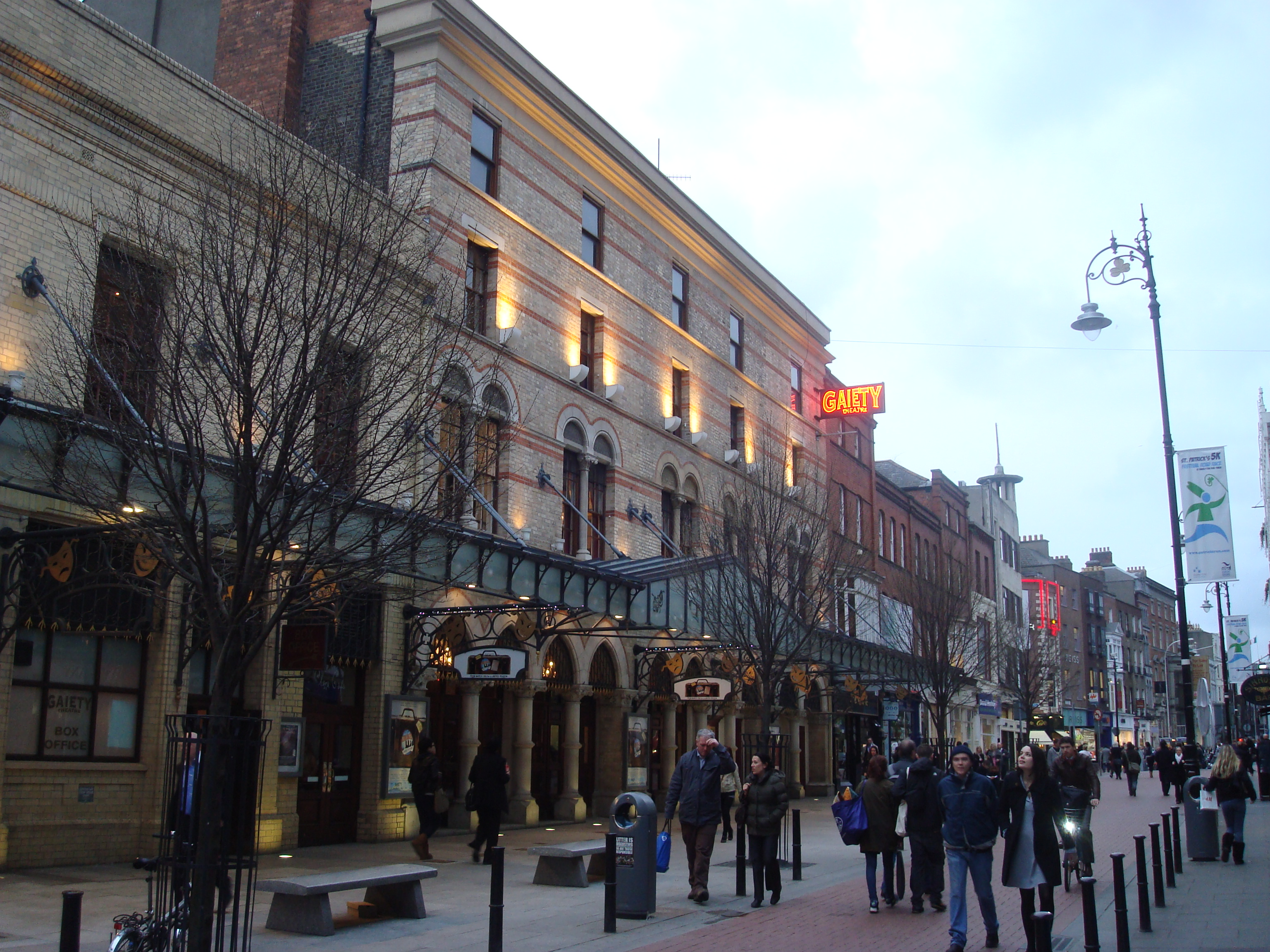
The Gaiety Theatre, Dublin – host venue of the 1971 contest

The 1971 contest was held in Dublin, Ireland, following the country's victory at the 1970 contest with the song "All Kinds of Everything" performed by Dana. It was the first time that the contest was hosted in Ireland. The selected venue was the Gaiety Theatre; opened in 1871, the staging of the contest coincided with the venue's centenary anniversary.

Within hours of Ireland's win at the 1970 contest, the director-general of the Irish public broadcaster Radio Telefís Éireann (RTÉ), Thomas P. Hardiman, confirmed that the broadcaster intended to stage the contest; however the staging of the contest in Ireland was not confirmed until a meeting of a European Broadcasting Union (EBU) committee in Helsinki in April 1970. The Gaiety was confirmed as the venue in July 1970, with other Dublin venues reported in relation to hosting the event including the Main Hall of the Royal Dublin Society, the Great Hall of University College Dublin, and the Abbey Theatre. An audience of around 700 was expected to be present in the contest venue, with around 400 seats removed to accommodate the orchestra and technical equipment.

== Participants ==
Eurovision Song Contest 1971 – Participation summaries by country
- Austria; Belgium; Finland; France; Germany; Ireland; Italy; Luxembourg; Malta; Monaco; Netherlands; Norway; Portugal; Spain; Sweden; Switzerland; United Kingdom; Yugoslavia

Eighteen countries were represented in the 1971 contest – the twelve nations which had been represented in 1970 were joined by Finland, Norway, Portugal and Sweden, who all returned after a year's absence; Austria, participating again after a two year break; and Malta, in its debut appearance. The large number of returning countries was reported to have been mainly due to a number of rule changes proposed for this edition of the contest; broadcasters from Finland, Norway, Portugal and Sweden had all declined to participate in 1970 due to dissatisfaction with a four-way tie for first place in the 1969 contest and the lack of a tie-break rule.

Two artists which had previously competed in the contest returned to represent their countries again for a second time: Katja Ebstein who had represented Germany in 1970, and Jacques Raymond who had represented Belgium in 1963. Raymond and his singing partner Lily Castel had been late replacements for the original duo selected to perform the Belgian entry, Nicole and Hugo, after Nicole had contracted jaundice before the contest.

Eurovision Song Contest 1971 participants
Country	Broadcaster	Artist	Song	Language	Songwriter(s)	Conductor
Austria	ORF	Marianne Mendt	"Musik"	German (Note: Specifically Viennese German)	Manuel Rigoni; Richard Schönherz	Robert Opratko
Belgium	BRT	Jacques Raymond and Lily Castel	"Goeie morgen, morgen"	Dutch	Paul Quintens; Phil Van Cauwenbergh	Francis Bay
Finland	YLE	Markku Aro and Koivisto Sisters	"Tie uuteen päivään"	Finnish	Rauno Lehtinen	Ossi Runne
France	ORTF	Serge Lama	"Un jardin sur la terre"	French	Jacques Demarny; Henri Dijan; Alice Dona	Franck Pourcel
Germany	HR (Note: On behalf of the German public broadcasting consortium ARD)	Katja Ebstein	"Diese Welt"	German	Fred Jay; Dieter Zimmermann	Dieter Zimmermann
Ireland	RTÉ	Angela Farrell	"One Day Love"	English	Ita Flynn; Donald Martin	Noel Kelehan
Italy	RAI	Massimo Ranieri	"L'amore è un attimo"	Italian	Giancarlo Bigazzi; Enrico Polito; Gaetano Savio	Enrico Polito
Luxembourg	CLT	Monique Melsen	"Pomme, pomme, pomme"	French	Pierre Cour; Hubert Giraud	Jean Claudric
Malta	MBA	Joe Grech	"Marija l-Maltija"	Maltese	Joe Grech; Charles Mifsud	Anthony Chircop
Monaco	TMC	Séverine	"Un banc, un arbre, une rue"	French	Jean-Pierre Bourtayre; Yves Dessca	Jean-Claude Petit
Netherlands	NOS	Saskia and Serge	"Tijd"	Dutch	Gerrit den Braber; Joop Stokkermans	Dolf van der Linden
Norway	NRK	Hanne Krogh	"Lykken er..."	Norwegian	Arne Bendiksen	Arne Bendiksen
Portugal	RTP	Tonicha	"Menina do alto da serra"	Portuguese	Nuno Nazareth Fernandes; José Carlos Ary dos Santos	Jorge Costa Pinto
Spain	TVE	Karina	"En un mundo nuevo"	Spanish	Tony Luz; Rafael Trabucchelli	Waldo de los Ríos
Sweden	SR	The Family Four	"Vita vidder"	Swedish	Håkan Elmquist	Claes Rosendahl
Switzerland	SRG SSR	Peter, Sue and Marc	"Les Illusions de nos vingt ans"	French	Peter Reber; Maurice Tézé	Hardy Schneiders
United Kingdom	BBC	Clodagh Rodgers	"Jack in the Box"	English	David Myers; John Worsley	Johnny Arthey
Yugoslavia	JRT	Krunoslav Slabinac	"Tvoj dječak je tužan" (Твој дјечак је тужан)	Serbo-Croatian	Zvonimir Golob; Ivica Krajač	Miljenko Prohaska

== Production and format ==
The Eurovision Song Contest 1971 was produced by the Irish public broadcaster Radio Telefís Éireann (RTÉ). Tom McGrath served as producer and director, Alpho O'Reilly served as designer, and Colman Pearce served as musical director, leading the 50-piece RTÉ Orchestra. A separate musical director could be nominated by each participating delegation to lead the orchestra during its country's performance, with the host musical director also available to conduct for those countries which did not nominate their own conductor. On behalf of the EBU, the event was overseen by Clifford Brown as scrutineer. The contest was presented by the Irish television presenter Bernadette Ní Ghallchóir.

Each participating broadcaster submitted one song, which was required to be no longer than three minutes in duration and performed in the language, or one of the languages, of the country which it represented. The maximum number of performers allowed on stage during each country's performance was raised at this contest to six, an upper limit which exists to the present day; previously entries were required to be performed by one or two principal vocalists with up to three supporting vocalists. This change effectively allowed groups to compete in the contest for the first time.

Following discussions and sustained pressure on the EBU to reform the contest, a new voting system was introduced, designed to produce a clear-cut winner and ensure no country would receive zero points. Each participating broadcaster appointed two individuals – one aged between 16 and 25, the other between 26 and 60, and with at least 10 years between their ages – who awarded each song a score between one and five votes, except for the song from their own country. The jurors were present in the contest venue, and followed the event from a separate room via television. After each country had performed they were required to record their votes, so that they could not be altered later. For the voting sequence the jurors were brought on stage, with the scores being announced by the jurors themselves in groups of three countries.

An additional rule change introduced for this contest aimed to improve the visibility of the participating entries among the general public before the contest final and give equal exposure to all entries: each participating broadcaster was required to produce a series of preview programmes to highlight the competing entries, and to provide the EBU with a promotional video of their entry which would be sent to all broadcasters for use in their own preview programmes. Broadcasters were required to showcase the entries over two or more individual broadcasts, and these programmes could be broadcast only once before the contest final. The promotional videos needed to be ready by 12 March 1971 for broadcast over the Eurovision network to all broadcasters on 17 March, and each broadcaster's preview shows were expected to be aired between 22 and 30 March.

The overall organisational costs were 65,000 Irish pounds, which was bigger than original estimates of between £10,000 and £30,000. The contest was one of the first programmes produced by RTÉ in colour, with the contest leading to the broadcaster acquiring colour broadcasting equipment a year earlier than originally planned at a reported cost of over £200,000. The costs of producing the event and the acquisition of new colour equipment required RTÉ to make significant funding cuts across all areas of the organisation; these cuts and the costs of a massive uplift in colour equipment when only around 1% of Irish television viewers had colour television sets in 1971 led to protests by several RTÉ employees – among them Eoghan Harris – on the day of the contest, who were reported to have leafletted the public pushing for a boycott of the event and jeered and booed delegates as they arrived at the theatre. The contest was also the target of picketers from Official Sinn Féin, who opposed Ireland's planned entry into the European Economic Community; Conradh na Gaeilge, who opposed RTÉ's coverage and production of a pop contest; the Irish Women's Liberation Movement; and the National Athletic and Cycling Association.

== Contest overview ==
Results of the Eurovision Song Contest 1971
R/O	Country	Artist	Song	Votes	Place
1	Austria	Marianne Mendt	"Musik"	66	16
2	Malta	Joe Grech	"Marija l-Maltija"	52	18
3	Monaco	Séverine	"Un banc, un arbre, une rue"	128	1
4	Switzerland	Peter, Sue and Marc	"Les Illusions de nos vingt ans"	78	12
5	Germany	Katja Ebstein	"Diese Welt"	100	3
6	Spain	Karina	"En un mundo nuevo"	116	2
7	France	Serge Lama	"Un jardin sur la terre"	82	10
8	Luxembourg	Monique Melsen	"Pomme, pomme, pomme"	70	13
9	United Kingdom	Clodagh Rodgers	"Jack in the Box"	98	4
10	Belgium	Jacques Raymond and Lily Castel	"Goeiemorgen, morgen"	68	14
11	Italy	Massimo Ranieri	"L'amore è un attimo"	91	5
12	Sweden	The Family Four	"Vita vidder"	85	6
13	Ireland	Angela Farrell	"One Day Love"	79	11
14	Netherlands	Saskia and Serge	"Tijd"	85	6
15	Portugal	Tonicha	"Menina do alto da serra"	83	9
16	Yugoslavia	Krunoslav Slabinac	"Tvoj dječak je tužan"	68	14
17	Finland	Markku Aro and Koivisto Sisters	"Tie uuteen päivään"	84	8
18	Norway	Hanne Krogh	"Lykken er..."	65	17

== Detailed voting results ==
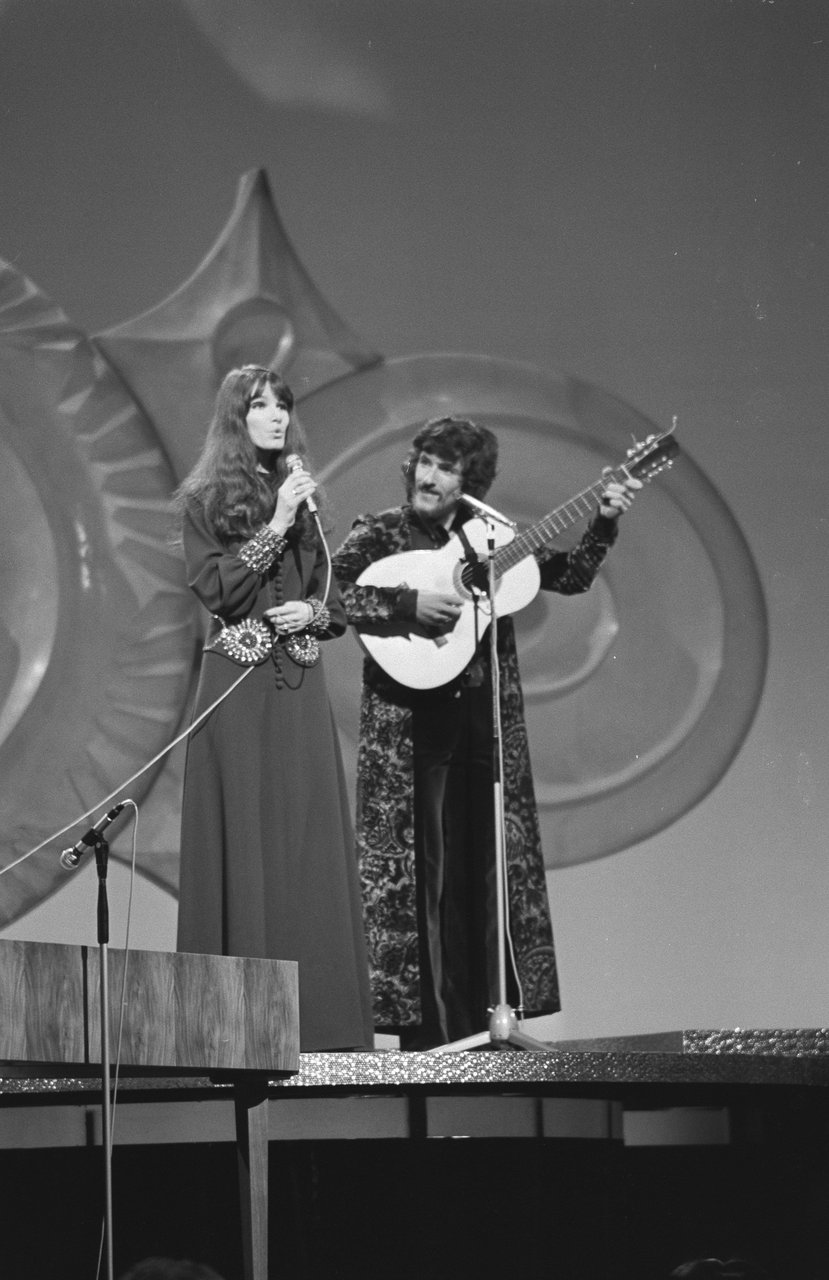
The Netherlands' Saskia and Serge finished 6th with their entry "Tijd".

A new voting system was introduced in this year's contest: each participating broadcaster appointed two jury members, one aged over 25 and the other under 25 (with at least ten years' difference between their ages), with both awarding each country (except their own) a score of between one and five.

While this meant that no entry could score fewer than 34 votes (and in the event all eighteen scored at least 52), it had one major problem: some jury members tended to award only one or two votes. Whether this was done to increase their respective countries' chances of winning is not known for sure, but this shortcoming was nonetheless plain. However, the system remained in place for the 1972 and 1973 contests.

Detailed voting results
		Total score	Austria	Malta	Monaco	Switzerland	Germany	Spain	France	Luxembourg	United Kingdom	Belgium	Italy	Sweden	Ireland	Netherlands	Portugal	Yugoslavia	Finland	Norway
Contestants	Austria	66		3	5	2	7	2	3	2	3	3	6	4	6	3	5	4	3	5
Contestants	Malta	52	4		2	2	3	5	3	2	3	4	4	2	4	5	2	2	3	2
Contestants	Monaco	128	4	5		10	10	2	8	4	8	10	4	10	9	9	8	10	7	10
Contestants	Switzerland	78	5	5	4		6	2	6	2	6	3	7	4	5	5	6	4	4	4
Contestants	Germany	100	6	5	7	6		8	8	2	6	7	6	6	5	5	7	7	5	4
Contestants	Spain	116	4	8	10	5	7		10	4	7	4	5	6	9	6	7	7	9	8
Contestants	France	82	3	2	8	8	5	5		2	5	3	4	4	6	9	5	5	3	5
Contestants	Luxembourg	70	2	7	6	3	2	4	5		6	3	3	2	5	3	6	4	5	4
Contestants	United Kingdom	98	4	8	8	6	5	2	8	4		8	3	5	7	5	7	6	6	6
Contestants	Belgium	68	3	2	5	4	2	2	5	2	6		3	5	4	6	6	3	6	4
Contestants	Italy	91	4	6	9	8	6	6	9	2	6	2		7	6	2	3	8	2	5
Contestants	Sweden	85	7	4	4	9	4	2	5	2	5	6	6		3	9	3	6	4	6
Contestants	Ireland	79	7	6	6	3	4	5	7	2	6	3	6	2		5	4	5	4	4
Contestants	Netherlands	85	6	2	6	5	4	5	7	2	5	2	2	6	5		9	5	6	8
Contestants	Portugal	83	4	3	6	2	5	10	8	5	6	4	4	2	3	5		6	5	5
Contestants	Yugoslavia	68	6	2	4	2	7	6	6	2	3	2	5	2	5	4	4		3	5
Contestants	Finland	84	4	4	4	4	4	3	4	2	10	10	2	4	6	3	8	6		6
Contestants	Norway	65	3	3	6	4	2	2	5	2	7	6	2	2	7	2	5	4	3	

=== 10 votes ===
Below is a summary of all perfect 10 scores that were given during the voting.

N.	Contestant	Nation(s) giving 10 votes
6	Monaco	Belgium, Germany, Norway, Sweden, Switzerland, Yugoslavia
2	Spain	France, Monaco
2	Finland	Belgium, United Kingdom
1	Portugal	Spain

== Broadcasts ==
Each participating broadcaster was required to relay the contest via its networks. Non-participating EBU member broadcasters were also able to relay the contest as "passive participants". Broadcasters were able to send commentators to provide coverage of the contest in their own native language and to relay information about the artists and songs to their television viewers. In addition to the participating countries, the contest was also reportedly broadcast in Greece, Iceland, Morocco, and Tunisia; in Bulgaria, Czechoslovakia, Hungary, Poland, and Romania via Intervision; and in Afghanistan, Argentina, Australia, Brazil, Ethiopia, Hong Kong, Jamaica, Kenya, Mauritania, Mauritius, Sierra Leone, Thailand, Trinidad and Tobago, Uganda, and the United States. Germany, Ireland, Portugal and Turkey have been reported to broadcast on radio. At least 28 commentators were reportedly in the contest, with an estimated 500 million viewers reported in the media.

Known details on the broadcasts in each country, including the specific broadcasting stations and commentators are shown in the tables below.

Broadcasters and commentators in participating countries
Country	Broadcaster	Channel(s)	Commentator(s)	Ref(s)
Austria	ORF	FS1	Ernst Grissemann	
Belgium	BRT	BRT	Anton Peters	
Belgium	BRT	BRT 2 Omroep Brabant	Fred Braeckman	
Belgium	RTB	RTB	Paule Herreman	
Belgium	RTB	RTB 1		
Finland	YLE	TV-ohjelma 1		
Finland	YLE	Yleisohjelma, Ruotsinkielinen ohjelma	Matti Paalosmaa	
France	ORTF	Deuxième Chaîne	Georges de Caunes	
Germany	ARD	Deutsches Fernsehen	Hanns Verres	
Ireland	RTÉ	RTÉ	Noel Andrews	
Ireland	RTÉ	RTÉ Radio	Kevin Roche	
Italy	RAI	Programma Nazionale TV, Secondo Programma	Renato Tagliani	
Luxembourg	CLT	Télé-Luxembourg		
Malta	MBA	MTS, National Network	Victor Aquilina	
Netherlands	NOS	Nederland 1	Pim Jacobs	
Norway	NRK	NRK Fjernsynet, NRK (Note: Deferred broadcast on NRK at 22:30 (CET))	Sverre Christophersen	
Portugal	RTP	I Programa	Henrique Mendes	
Portugal	ENR	Emissora Nacional Programa 1		
Spain	TVE	TVE 1	Joaquín Prat	
Spain	RNE	Radio Nacional		
Spain	RNE	Radio Peninsular de Barcelona (Note: Deferred broadcast at 24:00 (CET))	Ricardo Fernández Deu	
Spain	Cadena SER (Note: Simulcast on Radio Castellón, Ràdio Girona, Radio Las Palmas, Radio Murcia, Radio Rioja, Radio San Sebastián, Radio Sevilla, and Radio Valladolid.)			
Sweden	SR	TV1	Åke Strömmer	
Sweden	SR	SR P3	Ursula Richter	
Switzerland	SRG SSR	TV DRS	Theodor Haller	
Switzerland	SRG SSR	TSR	Georges Hardy	
Switzerland	SRG SSR	TSI		
Switzerland	SRG SSR	Radio Beromünster (Note: Delayed broadcast on 5 April 1971 at 22:30 (CET))		
United Kingdom	BBC	BBC1	Dave Lee Travis	
United Kingdom	BBC	BBC Radio 2 (Note: Simulcast on BBC Radio 1, BBC Radio Blackburn, BBC Radio Birmingham, BBC Radio Durham, BBC Radio Leicester, BBC Radio London, BBC Radio Newcastle, BBC Radio Oxford, BBC Radio Stoke-on-Trent, and BBC Radio Teesside.)	Terry Wogan	
United Kingdom	BFBS	BFBS Radio (Note: Delayed broadcast in Akrotiri and Dhekelia in a shortened format on 17 April 1971 at 23:15 (EET))	John Russell	
Yugoslavia	JRT	TV Beograd		
Yugoslavia	JRT	TV Ljubljana 1		
Yugoslavia	JRT	TV Skopje		
Yugoslavia	JRT	TV Zagreb		

Broadcasters and commentators in non-participating countries
Country	Broadcaster	Channel(s)	Commentator(s)	Ref(s)
Australia	Network 7			
Czechoslovakia	ČST	I. program (Note: Delayed broadcasts on 11 April 1971 in Bratislava at 21:30 (CET) and in Prague at 22:55 (CET); simulcast in color on II. program in Bratislava)	Ivan Úradníček	
Greece	EIRT	EIRT		
Hungary	MTV	MTV (Note: Delayed broadcast on 21 April 1971 at 11:00 (CET))		
Iceland	RÚV	Sjónvarpið (Note: Delayed broadcast on 18 April 1971 at 21:25 (WET))	Björn Matthíasson	
Poland	TP	Telewizja Polska (Note: Delayed broadcast on 24 April 1971 at 22:15 (CEST))		
Romania	TVR	Programul 1 (Note: Deferred broadcast in a shortened format the following day at 22:20 (EET))		
United States	PBS (Note: Delayed broadcast on 18 April 1971 at 22:00 (EST))			

== Notes and references ==
=== Bibliography ===
- O'Connor, John Kennedy (2010). The Eurovision Song Contest: The Official History (2nd ed.). London, United Kingdom: Carlton Books. ISBN 978-1-84732-521-1.
- Roxburgh, Gordon (2014). Songs for Europe: The United Kingdom at the Eurovision Song Contest. Vol. Two: The 1970s. Prestatyn, United Kingdom: Telos Publishing. ISBN 978-1-84583-093-9.
