= Netherlands in the Eurovision Song Contest 1970 =

- Eurovision Song Contest 1970
- Participating broadcaster: Nederlandse Omroep Stichting (NOS)
- Country: Netherlands
- Selection process: Nationaal Songfestival 1970
- Selection date: 11 February 1970

Competing entry
- Song: "Waterman"
- Artist: Hearts of Soul
- Songwriter: Pieter Goemans

Placement
- Final result: 7th, 7 points

Participation chronology

The Netherlands was represented at the Eurovision Song Contest 1970 with the song "Waterman", written by Pieter Goemans, and performed by three-sister group Hearts of Soul. The Dutch participating broadcaster, Nederlandse Omroep Stichting (NOS), selected its entry through a national final.

== Before Eurovision ==
=== Nationaal Songfestival 1970 ===
The final was held on 11 February 1970 at 20:35 CET, hosted by Pim Jacobs at the Congresgebouw in The Hague. Ten songs took part and the winning song was chosen by a national and an international jury, the latter consisting of ambassadorial staff from other nations based in the Netherlands. "Waterman" emerged the winner by 1 point over "Spinnewiel".

Although "Waterman" was a very contemporary-sounding song in the style of popular American group The 5th Dimension, its victory at the national final was contentious as it was chosen over the clear public favourite, the folk music-influenced "Spinnewiel" by Saskia and Serge. The decision by NOS to select Saskia and Serge internally as its representatives the following year was widely seen as a tacit acknowledgement that public opinion would have preferred them as the representatives in 1970.

As well as Saskia and Serge, future Dutch representatives Sandra Reemer (1972, 1976, and 1979) and Ben Cramer (1973) were also among the participants.

Final – 11 February 1970
| R/O | Artist | Song | Points | Place |
|---|---|---|---|---|
| 1 | Ben Cramer | "Julia" | 1 | 4 |
| 2 | Ine van den Berg | "Ik lach om je liefde" | 0 | 7 |
| 3 | Rosita Bloom | "Illusie" | 1 | 4 |
| 4 | Tony Anderson | "Spanje" | 0 | 7 |
| 5 | Sandra Reemer | "Voorbij is de winter" | 0 | 7 |
| 6 | D C Lewis | "Linda" | 2 | 3 |
| 7 | Joke Bruijs | "Okido" | 1 | 4 |
| 8 | Saskia and Serge | "Spinnewiel" | 5 | 2 |
| 9 | Hearts of Soul | "Waterman" | 6 | 1 |
| 10 | Bonnie St. Claire | "Manna" | 0 | 7 |

== At Eurovision ==
On the night of the final Hearts of Soul performed first in the running order, preceding Switzerland. 1970 was the last year in which Eurovision rules only allowed for solo performers or duos. Originally would not perform, the group was billed as 'Patricia and the Hearts of Soul' and the song was staged with Patricia singing up front and Bianca and Stella standing behind and to the left of her, ostensibly as backing singers. At the close of voting "Waterman" had received 7 points (3 from Italy and Yugoslavia and 1 from the United Kingdom), placing the Netherlands 7th of the 12 entries. The Dutch jury awarded its highest mark (5) to contest winners Ireland.

The Dutch entry was conducted at the contest by the musical director Dolf van der Linden.

Under the name of Dream Express, the group would later represent Belgium in the 1977 contest, while Stella also represented Belgium as a solo singer in 1982.

=== Voting ===
Points awarded to the Netherlands
| Score | Country |
|---|---|
| 3 points | Italy; Yugoslavia |
| 1 point | United Kingdom |

Points awarded by the Netherlands
| Score | Country |
|---|---|
| 5 points | Ireland |
| 3 points | United Kingdom |
| 2 points | Switzerland |
