= L'amore è un attimo =

1971 song by Massimo Ranieri

Single by Massimo Ranieri

from the album Via del Conservatorio
- Language: Italian
- Released: 1971
- Label: CGD
- Composer: Enrico Polito
- Lyricists: Giancarlo Bigazzi; Totò Savio

Eurovision Song Contest 1971 entry
- Country: Italy
- Artist: Giovanni Calone
- As: Massimo Ranieri
- Language: Italian
- Composer: Enrico Polito
- Lyricists: Giancarlo Bigazzi, Totò Savio

Finals performance
- Final result: 5th
- Final points: 91

Entry chronology
- ◄ "Occhi di ragazza" (1970)
- "I giorni dell'arcobaleno" (1972) ►

"L'amore è un attimo" ("Love is a moment") is a song recorded by Italian singer Massimo Ranieri. It represented Italy in the Eurovision Song Contest 1971, placing fifth. The song was released on Ranieri's album, Via del Conservatorio, and released through CGD in Italy, and CBS internationally.

== Releases ==
The B-side of the single has the song "A Lucia". Ranieri also recorded the song in German as "Die Liebe ist ein Traum" ("Love is a Dream"), in English as "Goodbye My Love", in Spanish as "Perdón cariño mío" ("Sorry My Darling") and in French as Pour un instant d'amour ("For a moment of love").

== At Eurovision ==
The song represented Italy in the Eurovision Song Contest 1971, held on 3 April at the Gaiety Theatre in Dublin. With this song Ranieri participated in the Eurovision Song Contest 1971, performing as the eleventh song before "Vita vidder" by the Swedish group Family Four. It scored 91 points, finishing fifth overall. The orchestra was conducted by Enrico Polito.

== Charts ==
Chart (1971–1972)	Peak position
Belgium (Ultratop 50 Wallonia)	28
France (IFOP)	15
Italy (Musica e dischi)	7
Mexico (Radio Mil)	3
Spain (AFYVE)	21
