= Un banc, un arbre, une rue =

1971 song by Séverine

Single by Séverine

from the album Un banc, un arbre, une rue
- Language: French
- B-side: "Viens"
- Released: 1971
- Genre: Bubblegum pop
- Label: Philips
- Composer: Jean-Pierre Bourtayre
- Lyricist: Yves Dessca

Eurovision Song Contest 1971 entry
- Country: Monaco
- Artist: Josiane Grizeau
- As: Séverine
- Language: French
- Composer: Jean-Pierre Bourtayre
- Lyricist: Yves Dessca
- Conductor: Jean-Claude Petit

Finals performance
- Final result: 1st
- Final points: 128

Entry chronology
- ◄ "Marlène" (1970)
- "Comme on s'aime" (1972) ►

Official performance video
- "Un banc, un arbre, une rue" on YouTube

"Un banc, un arbre, une rue" (French pronunciation: [œ̃ bɑ̃ œ̃n‿aʁbʁ yn ʁy]; "A Bench, a Tree, a Street") is a song recorded by French singer Séverine, with music composed by Jean-Pierre Bourtayre and French lyrics written by Yves Dessca. It represented Monaco in the Eurovision Song Contest 1971 held in Dublin, resulting in the country's only win in the contest.

== Background ==
=== Conception ===
"Un banc, un arbre, une rue" was composed by Jean-Pierre Bourtayre with French lyrics by Yves Dessca. It is a classic French ballad, with lyrics focusing on the loss of childhood innocence and people following their dreams. The opening lines of the chorus translate as "we all have a bench, a tree, a street / Where we cherished our dreams / a childhood that has been too short". Séverine recorded the song in four languages: French, English (as "Chance in Time"), German ("Mach' die Augen zu (und wünsch dir einen Traum)"), and Italian ("Il posto").

=== Eurovision ===
Télé Monte-Carlo (TMC) internally selected "Un banc, un arbre, une rue" as its entry for the 16th edition of the Eurovision Song Contest.

A promotional video was released showing Séverine singing the song in the empty square of Monte Carlo. It depicts her walking to a bench, sitting while performing the middle verses, and then walking away out of focus at the end.

On 3 April 1971, the Eurovision Song Contest was held at the Gaiety Theatre in Dublin, hosted by RTÉ and broadcast live throughout the continent. Séverine performed "Un banc, un arbre, une rue" third on the evening, accompanied by four teenage male backing singers. She followed Malta's "Marija l-Maltija" by Joe Grech and preceded Switzerland's "Les Illusions de nos vingt ans" by Peter, Sue & Marc. Jean-Claude Petit conducted the event's live orchestra for the Monegasque entry.

By the close of voting, the song had received 128 points, placing it first out of eighteen entries and winning the contest. It received the then maximum score of 10 points from six voting nations. The song holds the record for receiving the most 10-point scores from this voting era. It was succeeded as contest winner in 1972 by "Après toi" by Vicky Leandros for Luxembourg. It was succeeded as the Monegasque representative the following year by "Comme on s'aime" by Peter McLane and Anne-Marie Godart.

=== After 1971 ===
Séverine performed the song in the Eurovision twenty-fifth anniversary show Songs of Europe held on 22 August 1981 in Mysen.

== Chart performance ==
Despite an English version existing, the original French version reached the UK Top 10, a rare non-Anglophone hit in that market.

=== Weekly charts ===
| Chart (1971) | Peak position |
|---|---|
| Belgium (Ultratop 50 Flanders) | 3 |
| Belgium (Ultratop 50 Wallonia) | 1 |
| Finland (Suomen virallinen lista) | 10 |
| France (IFOP) | 4 |
| Germany (Media Control) | 23 |
| Ireland (IRMA) | 3 |
| Netherlands (Dutch Top 40) | 15 |
| Norway (VG-lista) | 2 |
| Switzerland (Schweizer Hitparade) | 5 |
| UK Singles (Official Charts) | 9 |

== Legacy ==
Paul Mauriat released an instrumental version of the song on his 1971 LP of the same title. His version was adapted in 1973 by Television Broadcasts Limited as the theme tune for their Miss Hong Kong Pageant, and has since been familiar to generations of Hong Kong residents. Because of it, the 1993 film "The Mad Monk" includes the crowning scene at the end, and Hu Weili rearrange the music in oriental style. Also in 1971, Carola Standertskjöld recorded a Finnish version, "Penkki, puu ja puistotie". Siw Malmkvist recorded a Swedish version, "På en gammal bänk" ("On an old bench"). Kirsti Sparboe recorded a Norwegian version as "På en gammel benk" (On an old bench), and Heli Lääts and Liilia Vahtramäe recorded an Estonian version "Tänav, pink ja puu" ("A Street, a Bench and a Tree").

| Preceded by "All Kinds of Everything" by Dana | Eurovision Song Contest winners 1971 | Succeeded by "Après toi" by Vicky Leandros |
