= Malta in the Eurovision Song Contest 1972 =

- Eurovision Song Contest 1972
- Participating broadcaster: Maltese Broadcasting Authority (MBA)
- Country: Malta
- Selection process: Song for Europe 1972
- Selection date: 12 January 1972

Competing entry
- Song: "L-imħabba"
- Artist: Helen and Joseph
- Songwriters: Charles Camilleri; Albert Cassola

Placement
- Final result: 18th (last), 48 points

Participation chronology

Malta was represented at the Eurovision Song Contest 1972 with the song "L-imħabba", composed by Charles Camilleri, with lyrics by Albert Cassola, and performed by Helen and Joseph. The Maltese participating broadcaster, the Maltese Broadcasting Authority (MBA), selected its entry through a national final.

Joe Cutajar won the national final with "L-imħabba" on 12 January 1972, and was joined by Helen Micallef for the Eurovision Song Contest 1972.

== Before Eurovision ==
=== National selection ===
Song for Europe 1972 was the national final format developed by the Maltese Broadcasting Authority (MBA) which determined the song that would represent Malta at the Eurovision Song Contest 1972. The competition consisted of two parts, and was almost identical in format to the 1971 national final. The first part was the Malta Song Festival 1971, where the top 6 songs would then go on to the Song For Europe contest. The two contests were organised by two separate organisations; the Malta Song Festival was organised by the Malta Song Festival Board, while Song For Europe was organised by MBA. The use of Malta Song Festival as part of the Maltese national final was a cooperation between the two organisations, this led to the broadcaster not actually being in control of the songs in its own national final.

==== Competing entries ====
The Malta Song Festival Board received 60 submissions, from which 12 were chosen to compete in the Malta Song Festival.

Song	Songwriter(s)
"Cuff, cuff"	E. Vella
"Din hi l-verita"	Sammy Galea, Doreen Galea
"Dment li nibqgħu flimkien"	V. Vella, Alfred C. Sant
"Fejn tistrieh il-qalb"	Carmello Zammit, Charles Mifsud
"Ghall dejjem"	F.X. Pisani, V.M. Pellegrini
"Ghanja ta' art twelidi"	F. Vassallo, M.T. Vassallo
"Għasfur taċ-ċomb"	Ray Agius, Alfred C. Sant
"Illum"	Doreen Galea
"L-imħabba"	Albert Cassola, Charles Camilleri
"L-imħabba u l-paċi"	J.B. Cassar, Edwige Cassar
"Paċi lid-dinja"	E. Cassar
"Xtaqt"	S. Zammit, J. Bellizzi

==== Malta Song Festival 1971 ====
Malta Song Festival 1971 was held on 4 December 1971 at the Corinthia Palace Hotel, hosted by Mary Grech and Norman Hamilton, and was only broadcast on radio. All songs except two were sung twice, and the top six, as voted by an international jury, qualified to Song For Europe 1972. Jon Lukas was initially meant to perform "Din hi l-verita" and "L-imħabba" but was in the United Kingdom and unable to get to Malta in time, so was replaced by Carmen Vella. The order in which the songs were performed is unknown

Artist	Song	Result
The Links	"Cuff, cuff"	—N/a
Carmen Scerry	"Din hi l-verita"	Qualified
Carmen Vella	"Din hi l-verita"	Qualified
Carmen Schembri	"Dment li nibqgħu flimkien"	—N/a
Enzo Gusman	"Dment li nibqgħu flimkien"	—N/a
Carmen Scerry	"Fejn tistrieh il-qalb"	Qualified
Mary Rose Mallia	"Fejn tistrieh il-qalb"	Qualified
Monica Bugeja	"Ghall dejjem"	—N/a
The Links	"Ghall dejjem"	—N/a
Doris Attard	"Ghanja ta' art twelidi"	—N/a
Helen Micallef	"Għasfur taċ-ċomb"	Qualified
Joe Cutajar	"Għasfur taċ-ċomb"	Qualified
Doreen Galea	"Illum"	Qualified
Joe Bugeja	"Illum"	Qualified
Carmen Vella	"L-imħabba"	Qualified
Mary Rose Mallia	"L-imħabba"	Qualified
Merga	"L-imħabba u l-paċi"	Qualified
Renato	"L-imħabba u l-paċi"	Qualified
Helen Micallef	"Paċi lid-dinja"	—N/a
Renato	"Paċi lid-dinja"	—N/a
Alfred Agius	"Xtaqt"	—N/a
Carmen Vella	"Xtaqt"	—N/a

==== Song For Europe 1972 ====
Song For Europe 1972 was held on 12 January 1972 at the Malta Television Studios. The voting was done by 2 separate juries; a 20-member jury consisting of 20 members of the public, 2 from each of Malta's electoral districts, who each gave 1 point to a song of their choice; and an 8-member jury consisting of 7 international juries and a Maltese jury, who each had 10 points to distribute between the six songs.

R/O	Artist	Song	Points	Place
1	Mary Rose Mallia	"Fejn tistrieh il-qalb"	26	2
2	Renato	"L-imħabba u l-paċi"	4	6
3	Joe Cutajar	"L-imħabba"	28	1
4	Helen Micallef	"Għasfur taċ-ċomb"	17	3
5	Carmen Scerry	"Din hi l-verita"	13	4
6	Joe Bugeja	"Illum"	12	5

== At Eurovision ==
After the national final it was decided to change the song to a duet and Joe Cutajar was joined by Helen Micallef. On the night of the final Helen and Joseph performed ninth in the running order, following Switzerland and preceding Finland. At the close of voting "L-imħabba" had received 48 points, getting Malta their 2nd last place finish in 2 years.

The song was performed ninth in the running order, conducted by the composer Charles Camilleri. It followed Switzerland's Véronique Müller and preceded Finland's Päivi Paunu and Kim Floor. At the close of voting, the song picked up a 48 points, placing it in last place for a second consecutive year.

Each participating broadcaster appointed two jury members, one below the age of 25 and the other above, who voted by giving between one and five points to each song, except that representing their own country. All jury members were colocated in the Grand Hall of Edinburgh Castle. The Maltese jury members were Mary Rose Mallia and Joe Zerafa.

=== Voting ===
Points awarded to Malta
Score	Country
10 points	
9 points	
8 points	
7 points	
6 points	United Kingdom
5 points	Finland
4 points	Netherlands; Ireland
3 points	Sweden; Monaco; Germany
2 points	Luxembourg; Italy; France; Portugal; Spain; Norway; Yugoslavia; Austria; Switzerland; Belgium

Points awarded by Malta
Score	Country
10 points	
9 points	
8 points	
7 points	
6 points	Italy; Ireland
5 points	Belgium; Portugal; Monaco; Norway; Austria; France
4 points	Sweden; Yugoslavia; Spain; Germany; Luxembourg; Switzerland
3 points	Netherlands; Finland
2 points	United Kingdom
