= Norway in the Eurovision Song Contest 1972 =

- Eurovision Song Contest 1972
- Participating broadcaster: Norsk rikskringkasting (NRK)
- Country: Norway
- Selection process: Melodi Grand Prix 1972
- Selection date: 19 February 1972

Competing entry
- Song: "Småting"
- Artist: Grethe Kausland and Benny Borg
- Songwriters: Kåre Grøttum; Ivar Børsum

Placement
- Final result: 14th, 73 points

Participation chronology

Norway was represented at the Eurovision Song Contest 1972 with the song "Småting", written by Kåre Grøttum and Ivar Børsum, and performed by Grethe Kausland and Benny Borg. The Norwegian participating broadcaster, Norsk rikskringkasting (NRK), selected its entry through the Melodi Grand Prix 1972.

== Before Eurovision ==
=== Melodi Grand Prix 1972 ===
Norsk rikskringkasting (NRK) held the Melodi Grand Prix 1972 at its studios in Oslo, hosted by Vidar Lønn-Arnesen. Five songs were presented in the final with each song sung twice by different singers, once with a small combo and once with a full orchestra. The winning song was chosen by voting from a 14-member public jury who each awarded between 1 and 5 points per song.

MGP - 19 February 1972
R/O	Combo	Orchestra	Song	Points	Place
1	Anita Hegerland	Gro Anita Schønn	"Happy hippie"	38	3
2	Inger Lise Rypdal	Kirsti Sparboe	"Lillebror"	40	2
3	Hanne Krogh	Grethe Kausland and Benny Borg	"Småting"	43	1
4	Ellen Nikolaysen	Anne-Karine Strøm	"Håp"	33	4
5	Eli Tanja	Jan Erik Berntsen	"Et hus på landet"	30	5

== At Eurovision ==
On the night of the final, Kausland and Borg performed 6th in the running order, following the United Kingdom's The New Seekers with "Beg, Steal or Borrow" and preceding Portugal's Carlos Mendes with "A festa da vida". "Småting" was a rather old-fashioned song, lyrically very similar in theme to the previous year's "Lykken er", and at the close of voting had picked up 73 points, placing Norway 14th in a field of 18.

=== Voting ===
Points awarded to Norway
Score	Country
10 points	
9 points	
8 points	
7 points	Finland
6 points	Ireland; Luxembourg
5 points	Malta; Portugal; Spain; Yugoslavia
4 points	Belgium; Germany; Monaco; Netherlands; Sweden; United Kingdom
3 points	Austria; France
2 points	Italy; Switzerland

Points awarded by Norway
Score	Country
10 points	United Kingdom
9 points	
8 points	Luxembourg; Netherlands; Spain
7 points	France; Switzerland
6 points	Finland; Germany; Ireland; Italy; Monaco
5 points	Austria; Sweden
4 points	Yugoslavia
3 points	
2 points	Belgium; Malta; Portugal
