= Ceol an Ghrá =

1972 song by Sandie Jones

Single by Sandie Jones
- Language: Irish
- B-side: "Cry, Cry Again"
- Released: March 1972
- Studio: Eamonn Andrews Studios
- Genre: Pop
- Label: Play
- Composer: Liam Mac Uistín
- Lyricist: Joe Burkett

Sandie Jones singles chronology
"I Don't Want to Play House" (1971)	"Ceol an Ghrá" (1972)	"What Do I Do" (1972)

Eurovision Song Contest 1972 entry
- Country: Ireland
- Artist: Sandie Jones
- Language: Irish
- Composer: Liam Mac Uistín
- Lyricist: Joe Burkett
- Conductor: Colman Pearce

Finals performance
- Final result: 15
- Final points: 72

Entry chronology
- ◄ "One Day Love" (1971)
- "Do I Dream?" (1973) ►

"Ceol an Ghrá" (Irish: [ˌcoːlˠ ə ˈɣɾˠaː], lit. 'Music of Love') is a 1972 song recorded by Irish singer Sandie Jones written by Joe Burkett and Liam Mac Uistín. It represented Ireland in the Eurovision Song Contest 1972 held in Edinburgh. It is notable as the only Irish-language entry ever submitted by Ireland; all other Ireland songs have been in English.

== Conception ==
"Ceol an Ghrá" was written by Irish playwright Liam Mac Uistín. The song was dedicated to his wife and mentions Tír na nÓg (Land of the Young), a country in Irish legend. Joe Burkett wrote the music.

== Eurovision ==
On 29 March 1972, "Ceol an Ghrá" performed by Jones competed in the national selection organised by Raidió Teilifís Éireann (RTÉ) to select its song and performer for the 17th edition of the Eurovision Song Contest. It took place at the Cork Opera House and was hosted by Mike Murphy. The song won the competition so it became the Irish entrant – and Jones the performer – for Eurovision.

Jones was not a fluent Irish speaker but learned the pronunciation of the words carefully. The contest took place at the height of The Troubles, and any expression of Irish culture, especially as the contest was taking place in Great Britain, could attract hostility: Jones received death threats, believed to be from Ulster loyalists, in the run up to the show.

On 25 March 1972, the Eurovision Song Contest was held at Usher Hall in Edinburgh hosted by the BBC, and broadcast live throughout the continent. Jones performed "Ceol an Ghrá" third on the night, following France's "Comé-comédie" by Betty Mars and preceding Spain's "Amanece" by Jaime Morey. Colman Pearce conducted the event's live orchestra in the performance of the Irish entry.

At the close of voting, the song had received 72 points, placing fifteenth in a field of eighteen.

== Release ==
Despite the poor result in the Eurovision, "Ceol an Ghrá" was popular in Ireland, reaching #1 on the Irish Singles Chart.
