= Ireland in the Eurovision Song Contest 1972 =

- Eurovision Song Contest 1972
- Participating broadcaster: Radio Telefís Éireann (RTÉ)
- Country: Ireland
- Selection process: National Song Contest
- Selection date: 13 February 1972

Competing entry
- Song: "Ceol an Ghrá"
- Artist: Sandie Jones
- Songwriters: Joe Burkett; Liam Mac Uistin

Placement
- Final result: 15th, 72 points

Participation chronology

Ireland was represented at the Eurovision Song Contest 1972 with the song "Ceol an Ghrá", written by Joe Burkett and Liam Mac Uistin, and performed by Sandie Jones. To date, this is the only entry from Ireland sung in Irish. The Irish participating broadcaster, Radio Telefís Éireann (RTÉ), selected its entry through a national final. The song eventually finished in fifteenth place in the international final held at the Usher Hall in Edinburgh.

== Before Eurovision ==
=== National Song Contest ===
The eighth National Song Contest was held on Sunday 13 February 1972, and was broadcast live from the Cork Opera House on RTÉ Television and RTÉ Radio, hosted by Mike Murphy. This was the first national song final in Ireland to be produced as an outside broadcast, away from the RTÉ studios in Dublin, where the previous seven finals had been held. This year, the number of songs in the final increased to ten. The winning song was decided by 10 regional juries, each consisting of six members, throughout Ireland.

Des Smyth had previously participated in the Irish national final in 1971, and finished in seventh place. Tina had finished in third place in 1968 with "One Love Two". Twink had appeared in the 1970 national final as part of the girl trio Maxi, Dick and Twink, who finished in second place behind Dana.

R/O	Artist	Song	Songwriter(s)	Points	Place
1	McLynns Old Market Street	"Certain Sunday"	Paula McLynn; Alan Zeserson	3	6
2	Sandie Jones	"Ceol an Ghrá" ("The Music of Love")	Joe Burkett; Liam Mac Uistin	30	1
3	Des Smyth	"Let's Be Thankful"	Jim Doherty; Des Smyth	10	2
4	Lola	"Oró Áine"	Marcus MacDonald; Pádraig Ó Méalóid	4	3
5	D.J. Curtin	"They Take Me Back"	Derry Lindsay; Jackie Smith	4	3
6	The Farrells	"Bualadh Bos" ("A round of applause")	Andy Galligan; Rev. P.J. Coughlan	0	10
7	Twink	"It'd Take A Miracle"	Barrie Todd	3	6
8	Joe Cuddy	"Mo Dhúchas Dún na nGall" ("My native Donegal")	Michael Reade; William (Clem) Quinn	1	8
9	Tina	"Don't Need Your Sympathy"	Michael Coffey; Wesley Burrowes	4	3
10	Paddy Murphy & Marie O'Shea	"Tar Liom" ("Come With Me")	Donal T. Hurley	1	8

Detailed Regional Jury Votes
R/O	Song	Athlone	Limerick	Westport	Cavan	Dundalk	Galway	Dublin	Donegal	Wexford	Cork	Total
1	"Certain Sunday"						2		1			3
2	"Ceol an Ghrá"	4	4	3	2	5		2	3	4	3	30
3	"Let's Be Thankful"		2	3	1	1			2		1	10
4	"Oró Áine"							4				4
5	"They Take Me Back"	1			1					1	1	4
6	"Bualadh Bos"											0
7	"It'd Take A Miracle"	1			2							3
8	"Mo Dhúchas Dún na nGall"									1		1
9	"Don't Need Your Sympathy"						4					4
10	"Tar Liom"										1	1

== At Eurovision ==
=== Voting ===
Mike Murphy commentated on RTÉ Television, and Kevin Roche with Liam Devally provided commentary for RTÉ Radio listeners. For the second year in succession, each of the 18 participating countries sent two jury members to the venue to cast their votes in vision, awarding between 1 and 5 points to each song, with the exception of their own country's entry. The criteria was that one juror from each country had to be over 25 years of age while the other had to be under 25 years, with a gap of at least ten years between their ages. Three countries voted together and this process was repeated a further five times.

=== Voting ===
Points awarded to Ireland
Score	Country
10 points	
9 points	
8 points	
7 points	
6 points	Norway; Malta; Luxembourg
5 points	Sweden; Monaco; Netherlands
4 points	Germany; Spain; United Kingdom; Portugal; Austria; Belgium
3 points	France; Switzerland; Finland; Italy; Yugoslavia
2 points	

Points awarded by Ireland
Score	Country
10 points	
9 points	Luxembourg
8 points	Netherlands
7 points	Portugal
6 points	Germany; United Kingdom; Norway; Switzerland; Austria
5 points	France; Spain; Yugoslavia; Sweden
4 points	Malta; Monaco; Belgium
3 points	Finland; Italy
2 points	
