= Switzerland in the Eurovision Song Contest 1972 =

- Eurovision Song Contest 1972
- Participating broadcaster: Swiss Broadcasting Corporation (SRG SSR)
- Country: Switzerland
- Selection process: Internal selection
- Announcement date: 4 February 1972

Competing entry
- Song: "C'est la chanson de mon amour"
- Artist: Véronique Müller
- Songwriters: Véronique Müller; Catherine Desage

Placement
- Final result: 8th, 88 points

Participation chronology

Switzerland was represented at the Eurovision Song Contest 1972 with the song "C'est la chanson de mon amour", composed by Véronique Müller, with lyrics by Catherine Desage, and performed by Müller herself. The Swiss participating broadcaster, the Swiss Broadcasting Corporation (SRG SSR), internally selected its entry for the contest.

== Before Eurovision ==
=== Internal selection ===
The Swiss Broadcasting Corporation (SRG SSR) held an internal selection on 3 February at Saint Moritz. Eighty artists applied to enter, with four ultimately being shortlisted for the selection. The shortlisted artists were Véronique Müller, the Rocky Till Singers, Pierre Alain, and a fourth unknown artist.

Despite being an internal selection, several online websites claim a national selection of six songs, five in French and one in German, took place at an unknown date and location. Although said factors on the date and location are untrue, the lineup of six songs is not known to be fully corroborated as there are no known reports that mention them by name. Among these songs is "Le chercheur d'or" by Pierre Alain, which participated in the 1975 Swiss selection. The following chart lists the six alleged songs that took part.

Alleged lineup of the internal selection
R/O	Artist(s)	Song	Songwriter(s)		Language
R/O	Artist(s)	Song	Composer(s)	Lyricist(s)	Language
1	Pierre Alain	"Le chercheur d'or"	Pierre Alain	Christian Vellas	French
2	Pierre Alain	"Capitaine"	Unknown		French
3	Carola	"Tout ira bien"	Alain Morisod	Charlotte Ruphi	French
4	Véronique Müller	"La rose et le tambour"	Véronique Müller	Catherine Desage	French
5	Véronique Müller	"C'est la chanson de mon amour"	Véronique Müller	Catherine Desage	French
6	Rocky Till Singers	"Lass mich beten für die Liebe"	Heinz Guley; Pepe Ederer		German

On 4 February, it was announced that the song "C'est la chanson de mon amour, composed and performed by Véronique Müller, with lyrics by Catherine Desage, was selected by the internal jury the day before. All corroborated information regarding the songs is listed in the chart below.

Internal selection (known songs) — 3 February 1972
Artist(s)	Song	Songwriter(s)		Language	Place
Artist(s)	Song	Composer(s)	Lyricist(s)	Language	Place
Véronique Müller	"C'est la chanson de mon amour"	Véronique Müller	Catherine Desage	French	1
Rocky Till Singers	"Lass mich beten für die Liebe"	Heinz Guley; Pepe Ederer		German	2
Pierre Alain	Unknown			French	Unknown

=== Releases ===
Véronique Müller would record and release "C'est la chanson de mon amour" in 1972. She would also release the song in German as "Liebe, So Heisst Meine Welt" that same year. In 1998, the song was featured in a CD compilation titled "Concours Eurovision De La Chanson 1956-1998: Schweizer Beiträge", which compiled every Swiss Eurovision entry at the time.

The Rocky Till Singers and Gilbert Bishop also recorded "Lass mich beten für die Liebe" in 1972.

== At Eurovision ==
At the Eurovision Song Contest 1972, held at the Usher Hall in Edinburgh, the Swiss entry was the eighth entry of the night following Portugal and preceding Malta. The Swiss conductor at the contest was Jean-Pierre Festi. At the close of voting, Switzerland had received 88 points in total; finishing in eighth place out of eighteen countries.

The contest was broadcast on SRG SSR via TV DRS (with commentary from Theodor Haller) and DRS 1 (Note: Delayed broadcast on 27 March 1972 at 22:30 (CET)) in German-speaking Switzerland, TSR (with commentary from Georges Hardy) and RSR 2 (with commentary from Robert Burnier) in Romandy, and TSI in Ticino.

=== Voting ===
Each participating broadcaster appointed two jury members, one aged between 16 and 25 and one aged between 26 and 55, with at least 10 years between their ages. They each awarded 1 to 5 points for each song, other than the song of their own country. They cast their votes immediately after each song was performed and the votes were then collected and counted. For the public voting sequence after the interval act, the jury members were shown on the stage's screen with each lifting a signboard with the number between 1 and 5 for each song, as a visual verification of the scores they had awarded earlier.

Points awarded to Switzerland
Score	Country
10 points	
9 points	
8 points	Austria
7 points	Finland; Luxembourg; Norway
6 points	Ireland; Monaco
5 points	France; Italy; Netherlands; Spain; Yugoslavia
4 points	Belgium; Germany; Malta; Sweden; United Kingdom
3 points	
2 points	Portugal

Points awarded by Switzerland
Score	Country
10 points	
9 points	Italy
8 points	United Kingdom
7 points	Austria
6 points	Luxembourg; Netherlands; Portugal
5 points	Germany
4 points	
3 points	Belgium; Finland; France; Ireland; Spain
2 points	Malta; Monaco; Norway; Sweden; Yugoslavia
