= Portugal in the Eurovision Song Contest 1972 =

- Eurovision Song Contest 1972
- Participating broadcaster: Radiotelevisão Portuguesa (RTP)
- Country: Portugal
- Selection process: Grande Prémio TV da Canção Portuguesa 1972
- Selection date: 22 February 1972

Competing entry
- Song: "A festa da vida"
- Artist: Carlos Mendes
- Songwriters: José Calvário; José Niza

Placement
- Final result: 7th, 90 points

Participation chronology

Portugal was represented at the Eurovision Song Contest 1972 with the song "A festa da vida", composed by José Calvário, with lyrics by José Niza, and performed by Carlos Mendes. The Portuguese participating broadcaster, Radiotelevisão Portuguesa (RTP), selected its entry at the Grande Prémio TV da Canção Portuguesa 1972. This was Mendes' second participation in Eurovision, having already represented Portugal in 1968, finishing in 11th place.

== Before Eurovision ==
=== Grande Prémio TV da Canção Portuguesa 1972 ===
Radiotelevisão Portuguesa (RTP) held the Grande Prémio TV da Canção Portuguesa 1972 at the Teatro São Luiz in Lisbon on 22 February 1972, hosted by Alice Cruz and Carlos Cruz. Eight songs took part in the final. A new voting system determined the results: in addition to the vote of the usual distrital jury, based in the respective 18 district capitals that had 20 votes each, RTP called the selection jury, composed of eight elements, to vote, each one with 10 votes to distribute among the songs in the contest. This year, the Interpretation Prize was established, an award that over the course of several festivals distinguished the best interpretations in the respective festivals; Duarte Mendes for the interpretation of "Cidade alheia" was elected this year.

Grande Prémio TV da Canção Portuguesa - 22 February 1972
R/O	Artist	Song	Conductor	Jury		Votes	Place
R/O	Artist	Song	Conductor	Selection	Distrital	Votes	Place
1	Paco Bandeira	"Vamos cantar de pé"	Pedro Osório	2	75	77	2
2	Duarte Mendes	"Cidade alheia"	Lan Biddle	12	9	21	6
3	Manuel Vargas	"Vem o caminheiro"	Jorge Machado	2	35	37	3
4	Carlos Mendes	"A festa da vida"	Richard Hill	55	172	227	1
5	João Henrique	"Esta festa das cidades"	Rafael Ferro	2	15	17	7
6	João Braga	"Amor de raiz"	José Torregrosa	3	27	30	4
7	Fernando Tordo	"Dentro da manhã"	José Torregrosa	3	7	10	8
8	Tozé Brito	"Se quiseres ouvir cantar"	Jorge Machado	1	21	22	5

== At Eurovision ==
On the night of the final Mendes performed 7th in the running order, following Norway and preceding Switzerland. At the close of the voting the song had received 90 points, coming 7th in the field of 18 competing countries, at the time Portugal's highest Eurovision finish. The orchestra during the Portuguese entry was conducted by Richard Hill.

Each country nominated two jury members, one below the age of 25 and the other above, who voted for their respective country by giving between one and five points to each song, except that representing their own country. All jury members were colocated in the Grand Hall of Edinburgh Castle. The Portuguese jury members were Pedro Sousa Macedo and Maria João Aguiar.

=== Voting ===
Points awarded to Portugal
Score	Country
10 points	Luxembourg
9 points	Italy
8 points	
7 points	Belgium; Ireland; Spain; Sweden
6 points	Switzerland
5 points	Malta; Netherlands
4 points	Austria; France; Monaco; United Kingdom; Yugoslavia
3 points	Germany
2 points	Finland; Norway

Points awarded by Portugal
Score	Country
10 points	
9 points	
8 points	
7 points	Italy; Luxembourg
6 points	Germany; Spain
5 points	Austria; Netherlands; Norway; Yugoslavia
4 points	Finland; Ireland; Sweden; United Kingdom
3 points	Belgium
2 points	France; Malta; Monaco; Switzerland
