= Sweden in the Eurovision Song Contest 1972 =

- Eurovision Song Contest 1972
- Participating broadcaster: Sveriges Radio (SR)
- Country: Sweden
- Selection process: Melodifestivalen 1972
- Selection date: 12 February 1972

Competing entry
- Song: "Härliga sommardag"
- Artist: Family Four
- Songwriters: Håkan Elmquist

Placement
- Final result: 13th, 75 points

Participation chronology

Sweden was represented at the Eurovision Song Contest 1972 with the song "Härliga sommardag", written by Håkan Elmquist, and performed by Family Four. The Swedish participating broadcaster, Sveriges Radio (SR), selected its entry through Melodifestivalen 1972. Family Four had already represented Sweden at the 1971 contest.

== Before Eurovision ==
=== Melodifestivalen 1972 ===
Melodifestivalen 1972 was the selection for the 13th song to represent Sweden at the Eurovision Song Contest. It was the 12th time that Sveriges Radio (SR) used this system of picking a song. Approximately 1,000 songs were submitted to SR for the competition. The final was held in the Cirkus in Stockholm on 12 February 1972, presented by Gunilla Marcus and was broadcast on TV1 but was not broadcast on radio.

R/O	Artist	Song	Songwriter(s)	Points	Place
1	Östen Warnerbring	"Sån e' du sån e' jag"	Peter Himmelstrand	17	2
2	Sylvia Vrethammar	"Din egen melodi"	Peter Himmelstrand	1	10
3	Cornelis Vreeswijk	"Önskar du mig, så önskar jag dig"	Cornelis Vreeswijk	8	6
4	Family Four	"Härliga sommardag"	Håkan Elmquist	24	1
5	Kisa Magnusson	"Kär och sisådär"	Peter Himmelstrand	9	5
6	Lena Andersson	"Säg det med en sång"	Benny Andersson, Björn Ulvaeus, Stig Anderson	12	3
7	Björn Skifs	"Andra kan väl också se"	Anders Henriksson, Claes Dieden, Bo Carlgren	4	9
8	Kjerstin Dellert	"Kärlek behöver inga ord"	Curt Peterson, Marcus Österdahl, Patrice Hellberg	10	4
9	Tomas Ledin	"Då ska jag spela"	Tomas Ledin	6	8
10	Monica Zetterlund	"Krama mig och dansa"	Tommy Körberg, Lars Nordlander	8	6

== At Eurovision ==
At the Eurovision Song Contest 1972, "Härliga sommardag" finished 13th (out of 18).

Each participating broadcaster appointed two jury members, one below the age of 25 and the other above, who voted by giving between one and five points to each song, except that representing their own country. All jury members were colocated in the Grand Hall of Edinburgh Castle. The Swedish jury members were Titti Sjöblom and Arne Domnérus.

=== Voting ===
Points awarded to Sweden
Score	Country
10 points	
9 points	
8 points	
7 points	Belgium; Yugoslavia
6 points	
5 points	Finland; Germany; Ireland; Luxembourg; Monaco; Netherlands; Norway
4 points	Austria; Malta; Portugal
3 points	France; Italy; Spain; United Kingdom
2 points	Switzerland

Points awarded by Sweden
Score	Country
10 points	Austria
9 points	
8 points	Germany; Italy; Luxembourg
7 points	Portugal; Spain
6 points	Netherlands; United Kingdom
5 points	Ireland
4 points	Finland; Norway; Switzerland; Yugoslavia
3 points	Malta; Monaco
2 points	Belgium; France
