= Germany in the Eurovision Song Contest 1972 =

- Eurovision Song Contest 1972
- Participating broadcaster: ARD (Note: Arbeitsgemeinschaft der öffentlich-rechtlichen Rundfunkanstalten der Bundesrepublik Deutschland) – Sender Freies Berlin (SFB)
- Country: Germany
- Selection process: Ein Lied für Edinburgh
- Selection date: 19 February 1972

Competing entry
- Song: "Nur die Liebe läßt uns leben"
- Artist: Mary Roos
- Songwriters: Joachim Heider; Joachim Relin

Placement
- Final result: 3rd, 107 points

Participation chronology

Germany was represented at the Eurovision Song Contest 1972 with the song "Nur die Liebe läßt uns leben", composed by Joachim Heider, with lyrics by Joachim Relin, and performed by Mary Roos. The German participating broadcaster on behalf of ARD, Sender Freies Berlin (SFB), selected their entry through a national final. Roos would later represent Germany again in 1984.

== Before Eurovision ==
=== Ein Lied für Edinburgh ===
The final was held at the TV studios in West Berlin, hosted by Karin Tietze-Ludwig and Renate Bauer. Twelve songs took part with voting done in two parts by a 10-member jury. Firstly, each jury member awarded between 1 and 5 points to each song. The votes were tallied and the four highest-scoring songs went through to the next round. Each juror then named their favourite of the remaining four.

The voting was close (4-3-3-0) and the choice of "Nur die Liebe läßt uns leben" was not particularly warmly received, as "Geh' die Straße" by Cindy & Bert had won the first voting round and had received the best audience reception of the twelve songs. Roos herself expressed surprise at the victory, saying that she had assumed she had lost after the initial voting, and was returning to her dressing room to remove her make-up when she was declared the winner.

First Round – 19 February 1972
| R/O | Artist | Song | Songwriter(s) | Points | Place | Result |
|---|---|---|---|---|---|---|
| 1 | Edina Pop | "Meine Liebe will ich dir geben" | Ralph Siegel; Fred Weyrich | 27 | 6 | —N/a |
| 2 | Teddy Parker | "Ich setze auf Dich" | Teddy Parker; Kurt Hertha | 18 | 11 | —N/a |
| 3 | Olivia Molina | "Die größte Manege der Welt" | Erich Becht; Kurt Feltz | 20 | 9 | —N/a |
| 4 | Cindy & Bert | "Geh' die Straße" | Werner Scharfenberger; Kurt Feltz | 41 | 1 | Advanced |
| 5 | Marion Maerz | "Hallelujah Man" | Klaus Doldinger; Karlheinz Frynik | 30 | 5 | —N/a |
| 6 | Adrian Wolf | "Mein Geschenk an Dich" | Ralph Siegel; Fred Weyrich | 13 | 12 | —N/a |
| 7 | Su Kramer | "Glaub an Dich selbst" | Rudi Bauer; Gerd Thumser | 38 | 3 | Advanced |
| 8 | Inga & Wolf | "Gute Nacht Freunde" | Reinhard Mey | 38 | 3 | Advanced |
| 9 | Sandra | "Das Leben beginnt jeden Tag" | Hans Blum; Kurt Hertha | 27 | 6 | —N/a |
| 10 | Sven Jensen | "Grenzenlos" | Günter Tilgert; Heinz Korn | 19 | 10 | —N/a |
| 11 | Mary Roos | "Nur die Liebe läßt uns leben" | Joachim Heider; Joachim Relin | 40 | 2 | Advanced |
| 12 | Peter Horton | "Wann kommt der Morgen" | Günter Engelhardt; Carl J. Schäuble | 27 | 6 | —N/a |

Detailed Jury Votes
| R/O | Song | E. Hilliges | C. Kneisel | C. Eder | W. Lau | E. Natzke | E. Böhmer | H. Hirschmann | C. Striegler | H. Wernstedt | E. Zalud | Total |
|---|---|---|---|---|---|---|---|---|---|---|---|---|
| 1 | "Meine Liebe will ich dir geben" | 4 | 2 | 3 | 3 | 2 | 2 | 3 | 3 | 2 | 3 | 27 |
| 2 | "Ich setze auf Dich" | 2 | 1 | 2 | 2 | 2 | 1 | 1 | 3 | 2 | 2 | 18 |
| 3 | "Die größte Manege der Welt" | 1 | 3 | 2 | 3 | 1 | 2 | 2 | 2 | 2 | 2 | 20 |
| 4 | "Geh' die Straße" | 3 | 4 | 4 | 5 | 2 | 5 | 5 | 5 | 4 | 4 | 41 |
| 5 | "Hallelujah Man" | 2 | 4 | 3 | 4 | 3 | 3 | 2 | 4 | 3 | 2 | 30 |
| 6 | "Mein Geschenk an Dich" | 2 | 1 | 1 | 1 | 1 | 1 | 1 | 3 | 1 | 1 | 13 |
| 7 | "Glaub an Dich selbst" | 3 | 5 | 5 | 3 | 4 | 3 | 3 | 5 | 3 | 4 | 38 |
| 8 | "Gute Nacht Freunde" | 3 | 5 | 3 | 4 | 3 | 4 | 4 | 4 | 4 | 4 | 38 |
| 9 | "Das Leben beginnt jeden Tag" | 4 | 2 | 3 | 3 | 2 | 2 | 3 | 4 | 2 | 2 | 27 |
| 10 | "Grenzenlos" | 3 | 2 | 1 | 3 | 1 | 2 | 2 | 3 | 1 | 1 | 19 |
| 11 | "Nur die Liebe läßt uns leben" | 4 | 3 | 4 | 3 | 3 | 5 | 5 | 3 | 5 | 5 | 40 |
| 12 | "Wann kommt der Morgen" | 3 | 2 | 2 | 4 | 2 | 3 | 2 | 4 | 3 | 2 | 27 |

Second Round – 19 February 1972
| R/O | Artist | Song | Points | Place |
|---|---|---|---|---|
| 1 | Cindy & Bert | "Geh' die Straße" | 3 | 2 |
| 2 | Su Kramer | "Glaub an Dich selbst" | 3 | 2 |
| 3 | Inga & Wolf | "Gute Nacht Freunde" | 0 | 4 |
| 4 | Mary Roos | "Nur die Liebe läßt uns leben" | 4 | 1 |

Detailed Jury Votes
| R/O | Song | E. Hilliges | C. Kneisel | C. Eder | W. Lau | E. Natzke | E. Böhmer | H. Hirschmann | C. Striegler | H. Wernstedt | E. Zalud | Total |
|---|---|---|---|---|---|---|---|---|---|---|---|---|
| 1 | "Geh' die Straße" | | | | 1 | | 1 | | 1 | | | 3 |
| 2 | "Glaub an Dich selbst" | | 1 | 1 | | 1 | | | | | | 3 |
| 3 | "Gute Nacht Freunde" | | | | | | | | | | | 0 |
| 4 | "Nur die Liebe läßt uns leben" | 1 | | | | | | 1 | | 1 | 1 | 4 |

== At Eurovision ==
On the night of the final Roos was drawn to perform first in the running order, preceding France. At the close of voting "Nur die Liebe läßt uns leben" had received 107 points, placing Germany third of the 18 entries, the third consecutive contest in which Germany finished in third place.

=== Voting ===
Points awarded to Germany
| Score | Country |
|---|---|
| 10 points | |
| 9 points | Spain |
| 8 points | France; Monaco; Sweden |
| 7 points | Belgium; Italy; Luxembourg |
| 6 points | Ireland; Netherlands; Norway; Portugal |
| 5 points | Austria; Finland; Switzerland; United Kingdom; Yugoslavia |
| 4 points | Malta |
| 3 points | |
| 2 points | |

Points awarded by Germany
| Score | Country |
|---|---|
| 10 points | |
| 9 points | Luxembourg |
| 8 points | United Kingdom |
| 7 points | Spain; Yugoslavia |
| 6 points | Austria; Netherlands |
| 5 points | France; Sweden |
| 4 points | Finland; Ireland; Italy; Monaco; Norway; Switzerland |
| 3 points | Malta; Portugal |
| 2 points | Belgium |
