= Finland in the Eurovision Song Contest 1972 =

- Eurovision Song Contest 1972
- Participating broadcaster: Yleisradio (Yle)
- Country: Finland
- Selection process: National final
- Announcement date: 5 February 1972

Competing entry
- Song: "Muistathan"
- Artist: Päivi Paunu and Kim Floor
- Songwriters: Juha Flinck; Nacke Johansson

Placement
- Final result: 12th, 78 points

Participation chronology

Finland was represented at the Eurovision Song Contest 1972 with the song "Muistathan", written by Juha Flinck and Nacke Johansson, and performed by Päivi Paunu and Kim Floor. The Finnish participating broadcaster, Yleisradio (Yle), selected its entry through a national final.

== Before Eurovision ==
=== National final ===
Eight entries were selected for the competition from 186 received submissions. This year each composer was only allowed to send a maximum of two songs. Yleisradio (Yle) held the Finnish national final on 29 January 1972 at its television studios in Helsinki, hosted by Aarre Elo. The winner was chosen by postcard voting that lasted two days. The results were supposed to be announced on 5 February 1972 but they had accidentally leaked the day before. Nevertheless, the result show was aired.

Final – 29 January 1972
R/O	Artist	Song	Songwriter(s)	Votes	Place
1	Katri Helena	"Sua rakastan"	Valto Laitinen; Sauvo Puhtila	18,530	2
2	Kirka	"Kaikkea on"	Erik Lindström; Sauvo Puhtila	10,324	3
3	Viktor Klimenko	"Romantique"	Rauno Lehtinen	3,363	6
4	Päivi Paunu and Kim Floor	"Muistathan"	Juha Flinck; Nacke Johansson	24,963	1
5	Christer	"Voin kaiken tunnustaa"	Henry Haapalainen	3,929	5
6	Jukka Kuoppamäki	"Kaukana oot ja lähellä aivan"	Seppo Paakkunainen; Jukka Kuoppamäki	1,951	7
7	Seija Simola	"Kaukainen laulu"	Heimo Saksio; Liisa Montan-Jyrä	5,072	4
8	Tapani Perttu	"Juoksupyörä"	Esa Pethman; Tupuna Vaissi	1,052	8

== At Eurovision ==
On the night of the final Päivi Paunu and Kim Floor performed 10th in the running order, following Malta and preceding Austria. The entry was conducted by Ossi Runne. At the close of voting, Finland picked up 78 points and placed 12th of the 18 entries.

The Finnish jury members were Marita Merikoski and Åke Granholm.

=== Voting ===
Points awarded to Finland
Score	Country
10 points	
9 points	
8 points	Belgium; Netherlands
7 points	
6 points	Luxembourg; Norway; Spain
5 points	Monaco; United Kingdom
4 points	Germany; Sweden; Portugal; Yugoslavia
3 points	Switzerland; France; Ireland; Austria; Italy; Malta
2 points	

Points awarded by Finland
Score	Country
10 points	
9 points	Netherlands
8 points	
7 points	Norway; Switzerland; United Kingdom
6 points	Italy; Luxembourg
5 points	Germany; Monaco; Sweden; Malta
4 points	Spain; Austria; France; Belgium
3 points	Ireland; Yugoslavia
2 points	Portugal
