= United Kingdom in the Eurovision Song Contest 1972 =

- Eurovision Song Contest 1972
- Participating broadcaster: British Broadcasting Corporation (BBC)
- Country: United Kingdom
- Selection process: Artist: Internal selection Song: A Song for Europe 1972
- Selection date: 12 February 1972

Competing entry
- Song: "Beg, Steal or Borrow"
- Artist: The New Seekers
- Songwriters: Tony Cole; Steve Wolfe; Graeme Hall

Placement
- Final result: 2nd, 114 points

Participation chronology

The United Kingdom was represented at the Eurovision Song Contest 1972 with the song "Beg, Steal or Borrow", written by Tony Cole, Steve Wolfe, and Graeme Hall, and performed by The New Seekers. The British participating broadcaster, the British Broadcasting Corporation (BBC), selected its entry through a national final, after having previously selected the performers internally. In addition, the BBC was also the host broadcaster and staged the event at the Usher Hall in Edinburgh, after the winner of the previous edition, Télé Monte Carlo (TMC) from Monaco, opted not to host the event.

== Before Eurovision ==
=== Artist selection ===
Contemporary press reports suggested that Cliff Richard was the first artist selected to represent the UK in 1972 by the BBC, but he was already committed to a concert on the date of the contest - 25 March 1972 - and was thus unavailable. As The New Seekers were booked to appear on his 1972 UK series, the BBC opted to offer them the opportunity. The group had just spent five weeks at No.2 with the song "Never Ending Song of Love" when they were confirmed as the UK entrants and their single "I'd Like to Teach the World to Sing" hit No.1 for four weeks at the same week the group began presenting the six short listed songs weekly on the Cliff Richard show.

=== A Song for Europe 1972 ===
The show was held on 12 February 1972 and presented by Cliff Richard as a special edition of his BBC1 TV series It's Cliff Richard! All songs were performed by the group The New Seekers, the first group ever to represent the UK in the contest and the first quintet ever to appear in Eurovision as a group. "Beg, Steal or Borrow" was chosen by viewers who cast votes via postcard through the mail. The UK was undergoing national and regional power cuts during the winter of 1972, due to a coal mining strike, leading to many viewers missing the broadcast of the six songs and the result the following week. The postal vote was thus lower than in previous years, but the winner still received 62,584 votes.

A Song for Europe 1972 – 12 February 1972
| R/O | Song | Songwriter(s) | Votes | Place |
|---|---|---|---|---|
| 1 | "Out on the Edge of Beyond" | John Bendall; Mike Sammes | 14,645 | 3 |
| 2 | "Sing Out" | Ronnie Dunlop | 7,412 | 5 |
| 3 | "Why Can't We All Get Together" | Ray Davies | 11,337 | 4 |
| 4 | "One by One" | Mike Leander; Eddie Seago | 27,314 | 2 |
| 5 | "Songs of Praise" | Roy Wood | 3,842 | 6 |
| 6 | "Beg, Steal or Borrow" | Tony Cole; Steve Wolfe; Graeme Hall | 62,584 | 1 |

=== Chart success ===
The group released all six songs from the UK final shortly after the contest. The winner, together with the runner up "One By One", was released on single and spent three weeks at No. 2 in the UK singles chart. Both tracks were then included in the album We'd Like to Teach the World to Sing, together with the last placed song "Songs of Praise". The album was also a No. 2 hit in the UK. Roy Wood who had composed the last placed entry released his own version of the track on the B-side of his 1973 No. 18 hit "Dear Elaine". Later in 1972, the remaining three songs from the UK final were released by The New Seekers in the budget LP What Have They Done To My Song, Ma? released on the Contour label. In subsequent years, all six songs by the group have been released on CD compilations.

== At Eurovision ==
"Beg, Steal or Borrow" won the national and went on to come second in the contest.

This was also the only Eurovision Song Contest between 1971 and 2008 in which Terry Wogan had no involvement with. Actor and royal commentator Tom Fleming provided the BBC Television commentary, whilst Pete Murray provided the radio commentary for BBC Radio 1 and 2 listeners. The contest was seen by 9.1 million viewers.

Each country nominated two jury members, one below the age of 25 and the other above, who voted for their respective country by giving between one and five points to each song, except that representing their own country. All jury members were colocated in the Grand Hall of Edinburgh Castle. The jury members from the United Kingdom were Doreen Samuels and Robert Walker.

=== Voting ===
Points awarded to the United Kingdom
| Score | Country |
|---|---|
| 10 points | Norway |
| 9 points | France; Monaco; Yugoslavia |
| 8 points | Germany; Luxembourg; Netherlands; Switzerland |
| 7 points | Austria; Finland; Italy |
| 6 points | Ireland; Sweden |
| 5 points | |
| 4 points | Belgium; Portugal |
| 3 points | |
| 2 points | Malta; Spain |

Points awarded by the United Kingdom
| Score | Country |
|---|---|
| 10 points | Luxembourg |
| 9 points | France; Netherlands |
| 8 points | |
| 7 points | |
| 6 points | Malta |
| 5 points | Belgium; Finland; Germany; Monaco; Yugoslavia |
| 4 points | Ireland; Norway; Portugal; Switzerland |
| 3 points | Austria; Italy; Spain; Sweden |
| 2 points | |
