= Netherlands in the Eurovision Song Contest 1972 =

- Eurovision Song Contest 1972
- Participating broadcaster: Nederlandse Omroep Stichting (NOS)
- Country: Netherlands
- Selection process: Artist: Internal selection Song: Nationaal Songfestival 1972
- Selection date: 22 February 1972

Competing entry
- Song: "Als het om de liefde gaat"
- Artist: Sandra and Andres
- Songwriters: Dries Holten; Hans van Hemert

Placement
- Final result: 4th, 106 points

Participation chronology

The Netherlands was represented at the Eurovision Song Contest 1972 with the song "Als het om de liefde gaat", composed by Dries Holten, with lyrics by Hans van Hemert, and performed by Sandra and Andres. The Dutch participating broadcaster, Nederlandse Omroep Stichting (NOS), selected its entry through a national final, after having previously selected the performers internally. Sandra would appear twice more at Eurovision (in 1976 and 1979).

== Before Eurovision ==
=== Nationaal Songfestival 1972 ===
The final was held on 22 February 1972 at the Theater Carré in Amsterdam, hosted by Willy Dobbe. Only three songs were performed and voting was by eleven regional juries, each with 10 points to divide between the songs. "Als het om de liefde gaat" emerged the clear winner.

Final – 22 February 1972
| R/O | Song | Points | Place |
|---|---|---|---|
| 1 | "Als het om de liefde gaat" | 73 | 1 |
| 2 | "De oude zigeuner" | 28 | 2 |
| 3 | "Lang zo fijn niet" | 9 | 3 |

== At Eurovision ==
On the night of the final, Sandra and Andres performed last in the running order, following eventual contest winners Luxembourg. The pair, both dressed in vivid green outfits, gave a confident and engaging performance of the night's most bouncy, uptempo song. At the close of voting "Als het om de liefde gaat" had received 106 points, placing the Netherlands 4th of the 18 entries.

The Dutch conductor at the contest was Harry van Hoof.

"Als het om de liefde gaat" reached number 3 on the Dutch Singles chart and was also released in English, French, and German versions.

Each participating broadcaster appointed two jury members, one below the age of 25 and the other above, who voted by giving between one and five points to each song, except that representing their own country. All jury members were located in the Grand Hall of Edinburgh Castle. The Dutch jury members were Jennifer Baljet and Hendrik Cornelis Wagter.

=== Voting ===
Points awarded to the Netherlands
| Score | Country |
|---|---|
| 10 points | |
| 9 points | Finland; United Kingdom; Yugoslavia |
| 8 points | Ireland; Norway; Spain |
| 7 points | Luxembourg |
| 6 points | Austria; France; Germany; Sweden; Switzerland |
| 5 points | Monaco; Portugal |
| 4 points | |
| 3 points | Italy; Malta |
| 2 points | Belgium |

Points awarded by the Netherlands
| Score | Country |
|---|---|
| 10 points | |
| 9 points | Austria; Luxembourg |
| 8 points | Finland; United Kingdom |
| 7 points | |
| 6 points | France; Germany; Yugoslavia |
| 5 points | Ireland; Italy; Monaco; Portugal; Spain; Sweden; Switzerland |
| 4 points | Malta; Norway |
| 3 points | Belgium |
| 2 points | |
