= Spain in the Eurovision Song Contest 1972 =

- Eurovision Song Contest 1972
- Participating broadcaster: Televisión Española (TVE)
- Country: Spain
- Selection process: Internal selection
- Announcement date: Artist: 19 January 1972; Song: 20 February 1972

Competing entry
- Song: "Amanece"
- Artist: Jaime Morey
- Songwriters: Augusto Algueró; Ramón Arcusa

Placement
- Final result: 10th, 83 points

Participation chronology

Spain was represented at the Eurovision Song Contest 1972 with the song "Amanece", composed by Augusto Algueró, with lyrics by Ramón Arcusa, and performed by Jaime Morey. The Spanish participating broadcaster, Televisión Española (TVE), internally selected its entry for the contest. Morey had participated in the national selections to represent Spain in 1965, 1970, and in 1971. The song, performed in position 4, placed tenth out of eighteen competing entries with 83 points.

== Before Eurovision ==
Televisión Española (TVE) internally selected "Amanece" performed by Jaime Morey as its entry for the Eurovision Song Contest 1972. The song was composed by Augusto Algueró, and had lyrics by Ramón Arcusa. The composer and the performer were announced on 19 January 1972. The song was presented to the press on 20 February.

== At Eurovision ==
On 25 March 1972, the Eurovision Song Contest was held at the Usher Hall in Edinburgh hosted by the British Broadcasting Corporation (BBC) and broadcast live throughout the continent. Morey performed "Amanece" 4th in the evening, following Ireland and preceding the United Kingdom. Augusto Algueró conducted the event's orchestra performance of the Spanish entry. At the close of voting "Amanece" had received 83 points, placing 10th in a field of 18.

TVE broadcast the contest in Spain on TVE 1 with commentary by Julio Rico.

=== Voting ===
Each participating broadcaster appointed two jury members, one below the age of 25 and the other above, with at least 10 years between their ages, who voted by giving between one and five votes to each song, except that representing their own country. All jury members were located at the Great Hall of Edinburgh Castle and showed their votes on screen during the voting sequence. The Spanish jury members were Emma Cohen and Luis María Anson, deputy director of ABC.

Points awarded to Spain
Score	Country
10 points	
9 points	
8 points	Monaco; Norway
7 points	Germany; Sweden
6 points	Portugal
5 points	Austria; France; Ireland; Luxembourg; Netherlands
4 points	Finland; Malta
3 points	Belgium; Italy; Switzerland; United Kingdom
2 points	Yugoslavia

Points awarded by Spain
Score	Country
10 points	
9 points	Germany
8 points	Netherlands; Yugoslavia
7 points	Portugal
6 points	Austria; Finland
5 points	Norway; Switzerland
4 points	Ireland
3 points	Monaco; Sweden
2 points	Belgium; France; Italy; Luxembourg; Malta; United Kingdom
