= Markku Aro =

Finnish singer

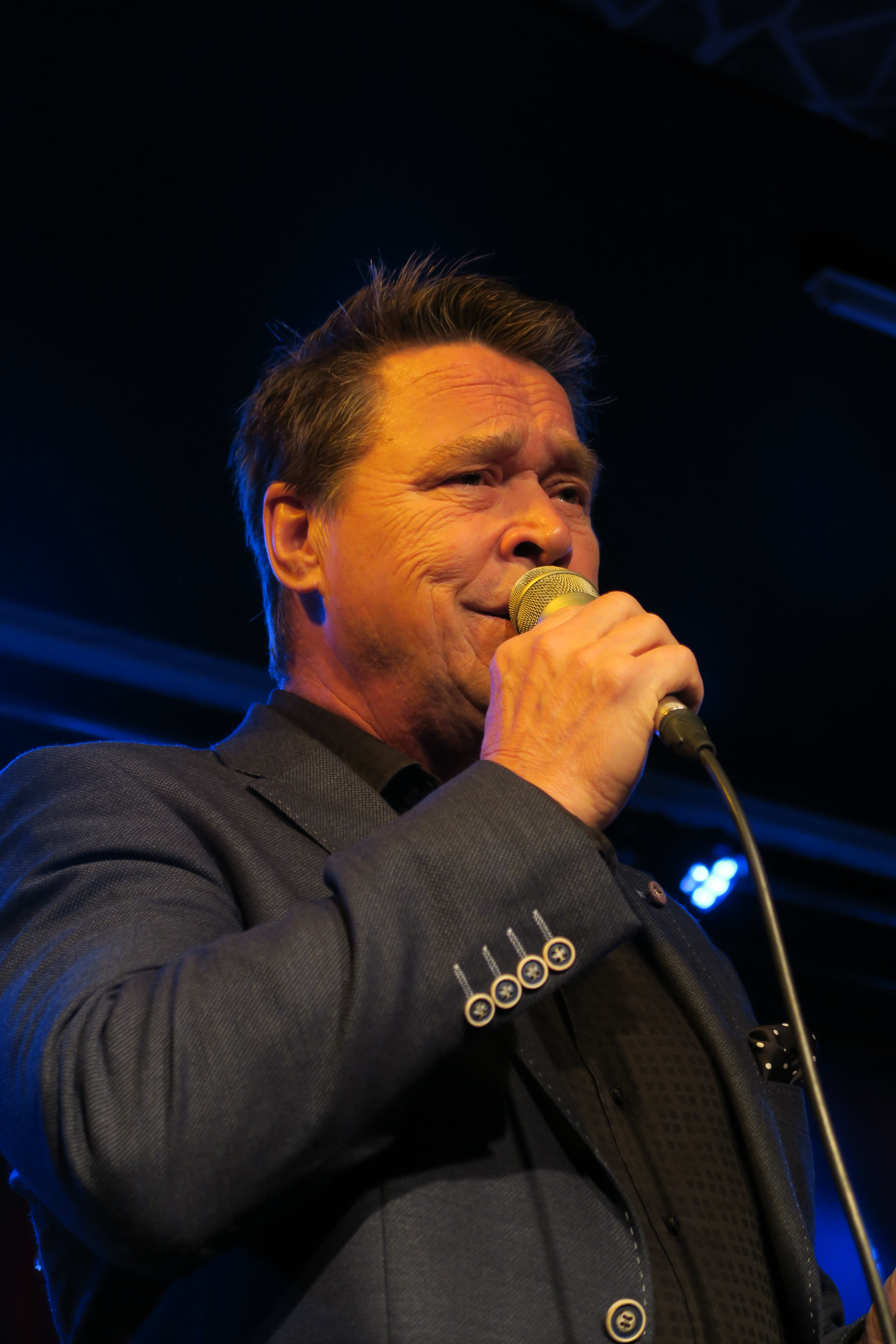
Markku Aro singing.

Markku Aro (Finnish pronunciation: [ˈmɑrkːu ˈɑro]; born Markku Tuomas Puputti on 3 February 1950 in Mouhijärvi, Finland), is a Finnish singer who represented Finland in the Eurovision Song Contest 1971 in Ireland with the pop-duo Koivistolaiset. They appeared with the song "Tie uuteen päivään" ("Road to a New Day"). He has released many albums in his country and was awarded with the Iskelmä-Finlandia prize for schlager music in 2017.

== Career ==
Aro was discovered in local singing competitions in Nokia by manager Tauno “Tappi” Suojanen while still at school.

He issued his debut single “Käyn uudelleen eiliseen” in 1968 and entered Finland’s Eurovision selection for the first time the following year.

Aro competed in the Finnish Eurovision heats in 1969, 1971, 1974, 1976, 1979 and 1981, winning in 1971. The Dublin performance was conducted by composer Rauno Lehtinen.

During the 1970s he became one of Finland’s best-selling male vocalists. Hits from the decade include “Hyvännäköinen”, “Moskiitto”, “Jestas sentään”, “Oma kultasein”, “Anna kaikkien kukkien kukkia”, “Etsin kunnes löydän sun”, “Pois sun vien”, “Kun sä vierelläin sateessa oot” and “Loit elämälle pohjaa”. Late-decade collaborations with arranger-producer Veikko Samuli yielded further successes such as “Keskiyön aikaan” and “Ollaan lähekkäin”.

Around 1980 Aro began working with British-Singaporean singer Nisa Soraya; their duet “Mun suothan tulla vierees sun” appeared in the 1981 Eurovision selection. Later releases with producer Kassu Halonen include “Kaksi rakkainta” and “Kyyneleet sielun puhdistaa”, the latter finishing third in the 1989 Syksyn Sävel song contest.

Aro’s best-selling album, Etsin kunnes löydän sun (1976), has sold more than 31 000 copies and earned a gold disc. In 2001 he was shortlisted for the inaugural Iskelmä-Finlandia award.

He joined the second season of the TV music series Tähdet, tähdet in 2015, placing third.

== Personal life ==
Aro has been married four times and has five children: Tuomas and Miika from his first marriage, Teemu from his second, and Senja from his third. He has been married to Satu Puputti (b. 1975) since 2010.

== Discography ==
=== Albums ===
- Markku Aro (1969)
- Oo - mikä nainen (1972)
- Niin käy kun rakastuu (1973)
- Oma kultasein (1974)
- Katso luontoa ja huomaa (1975)
- Etsin kunnes löydän sun (1976)
- Markku Aro (1977)
- Anna aikaa (1978)
- Daniela (1979)
- Mun suothan tulla vierees sun (1981)
- Suojassa saman auringon (1982)
- Markku Aro (1985)
- Kaksi rakkainta (1990)
- Rakastamme vain toisiamme (1991)
- Käsi kädessä (1993)
- Rakkauden toukokuu (1997)
- Menneisyyden sillat (1999)
- Sinetti (2001)
- Kestän mitä vaan (2006)
- Tilaisuus on nyt (2008)
- Anna katse (2010)
- Anna tulta (2013)

=== Compilations ===
- Parhaat päältä (1978)
- Markku Aron parhaat (1979)
- Parhaat (1989)
- Markku Aro (1990)
- 20 suosikkia – Etsin kunnes löydän sun (1995)
- Markku Aro (1995)
- 20 suosikkia – Rakastamme vain toisiamme (1997)
- 20 suosikkia – Anna mun ajoissa tietää (2001)
- Kaikki parhaat 1968-2001 (2CD) (2001)
- Suomihuiput (2003)
- Hitit (2004
- Tähtisarja - 30 suosikkia (2CD) (2006)
- Käyn uudelleen eiliseen – 50 vuoden klassikot (2018)

Preceded by Jarkko & Laura with Kuin silloin ennen	Finland in the Eurovision Song Contest; 1971	Succeeded by Päivi Paunu & Kim Floor with Muistathan
