= Belgium in the Eurovision Song Contest 1972 =

- Eurovision Song Contest 1972
- Participating broadcaster: Radiodiffusion-télévision belge (RTB)
- Country: Belgium
- Selection process: Artist: Internal selection Song: Chansons pour l'Eurovision 72
- Selection date: Artist: October 1971; Song: 15 February 1972

Competing entry
- Song: "À la folie ou pas du tout"
- Artist: Serge and Christine Ghisoland
- Songwriters: Daniel Nélis; Bob Milan

Placement
- Final result: 17th, 55 points

Participation chronology

Belgium was represented at the Eurovision Song Contest 1972 with the song "À la folie ou pas du tout", written by Daniel Nélis and Bob Milan, and performed by Serge and Christine Ghisoland. The Belgian participating broadcaster, Walloon Radiodiffusion-télévision belge (RTB), selected its entry through a national final, after having previously selected the performer internally. The Ghisolands had previously participated in the 1970 national final.

== Before Eurovision ==
=== Artist selection ===
In October 1971, Walloon broadcaster Radiodiffusion-télévision belge (RTB) announced that they had internally selected Serge and Christine Ghisoland to represent Belgium in the Eurovision Song Contest 1972.

=== Chansons pour l'Eurovision 72 ===
Chansons pour l'Eurovision 72 was the national final format developed by RTB in order to select the Belgian entry for the Eurovision Song Contest 1972. The competition was held on 15 February 1972 and was broadcast on RTB.

==== Competing entries ====
Following the announcement of the Ghisolands as Belgian representatives, a song submission period was opened where composers were able to submit their songs until 31 December 1971. RTB received 180 submissions and, in collaboration with SABAM, selected four songs from the received songs to participate in the contest.

Competing entries
| Song | Songwriter(s) | |
| Song | Composer(s) | Lyricist(s) |
|---|---|---|
| "À la folie ou pas du tout" | Daniel Nélis, Bob Milan | Daniel Nélis |
| "Femme" | Serge Ghisoland | Pierre Coran |
| "Tant que mon coeur" | Jean Demison, Willy Baetslé | |
| "Vivre sans toi" | Jack Say | Jean Miret |

==== Final ====
The final was broadcast in two parts. The songs were previewed on 28 January 1972, and the public could start sending in postcards. The songs were then shown again on 15 February 1972 and the public could also start televoting. The winner was decided by a combination of the postcard votes and televotes. The final was hosted by Michel Lemaire.

Final – 15 February 1972
| R/O | Song | Place |
|---|---|---|
| 1 | "À la folie ou pas du tout" | 1 |
| 2 | "Tant que mon coeur" | |
| 3 | "Vivre sans toi" | |
| 4 | "Femme" | 2 |

== At Eurovision ==
The contest was broadcast on RTB (with commentary by Paule Herreman) and BRT. It was also broadcast on radio station RTB 1.

On the night of the final the Ghisolands performed 16th in the running order, following Monaco and preceding eventual winner Luxembourg. The song seemed rather quaint and old-fashioned in comparison to many of the year's other entries, and at the close of the voting "À la folie ou pas du tout" had received 55 points, placing Belgium 17th of the 18 entries, ahead only of Malta.

Each participating broadcaster appointed two jury members, one below the age of 25 and the other above, who voted by giving between one and five points to each song, except that representing their own country. All jury members were colocated in the Grand Hall of Edinburgh Castle. The Belgian jury members were Charles Alboort and Denis Grimée.

=== Voting ===
Points awarded to Belgium
| Score | Country |
|---|---|
| 10 points | |
| 9 points | |
| 8 points | |
| 7 points | |
| 6 points | Luxembourg |
| 5 points | Malta; United Kingdom |
| 4 points | Finland; Ireland; Monaco |
| 3 points | France; Italy; Netherlands; Portugal; Switzerland |
| 2 points | Austria; Germany; Norway; Spain; Sweden; Yugoslavia |

Points awarded by Belgium
| Score | Country |
|---|---|
| 10 points | |
| 9 points | |
| 8 points | Finland; Luxembourg; Yugoslavia |
| 7 points | France; Germany; Portugal; Sweden |
| 6 points | Italy |
| 5 points | |
| 4 points | Austria; Ireland; Monaco; Norway; Switzerland; United Kingdom |
| 3 points | Spain |
| 2 points | Malta; Netherlands |
