= Lena Andersson (singer) =

Swedish singer (born 1955)

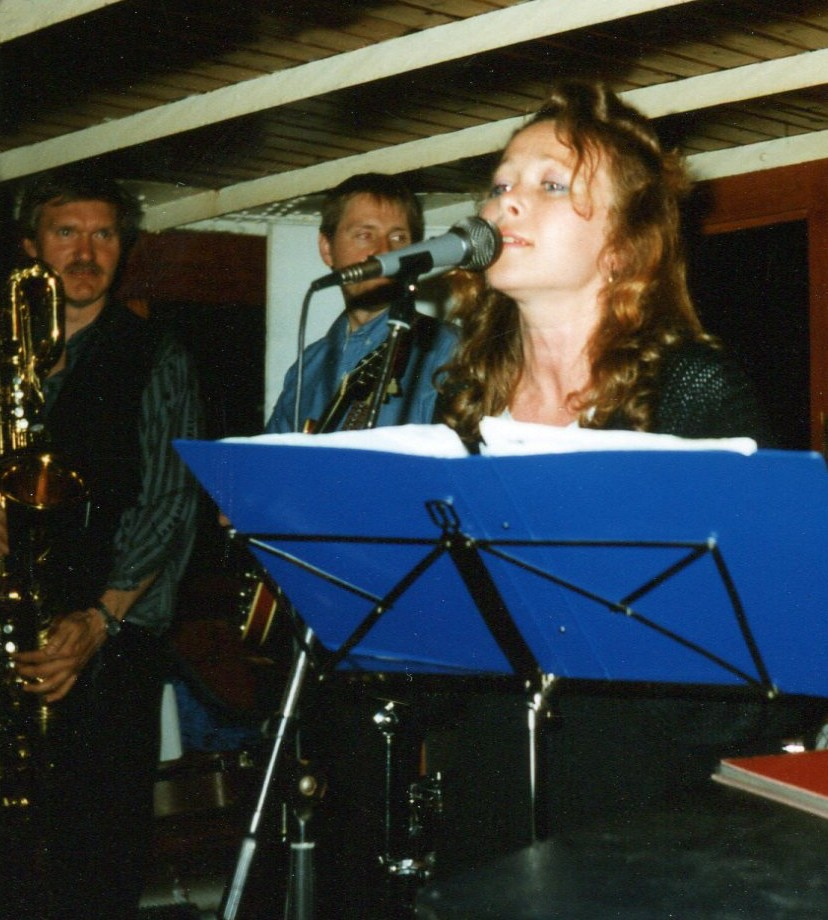
- Lena Andersson with "Slims bluesgäng" in 1987 on board SS Blidösund

Background information
- Born: 11 April 1955 (age 70); Fritsla, Sweden
- Genres: Gospel; Schlager pop
- Occupation: Singer
- Years active: 1970–present
- Label: Polar

Lena Marianne Andersson (born 11 April 1955) is a Swedish singer, scoring several hits in the early 1970s. Andersson was signed at 15 years old as a Polar recording artist in 1971. Benny & Björn of ABBA wrote a song for her which came third in the 1972 Swedish Eurovision selection contest. Andersson also recorded as a backing singer for ABBA in tour.

== Biography ==
=== Early life ===
Andersson was born in April 1955. At age seven, she moved with her parents to Halmstad and was enrolled in first grade for the spring semester. She was given a guitar at the age of 12 and discovered a love of folk music, adopting a vocal style similar to that of Joan Baez and Judy Collins. Lena collaborated with her best friend Pia, a lyricist, and in December 1970, she sent seven songs with guitar accompaniment to the Janne Forsell school as part of an admissions application and after some of her music made its way to radio, she came to the attention of manager Stig Anderson. In January of that year Lena went to Stockholm, accompanied by her father, to train and she did a live recording on the program Midnight Hour where she met Stig Anderson in person, leading to an offer to produce an LP. The LP was recorded by Lena at age 15 during winter break in 1971, accompanied by, amongst others, guitarist Janne Schaffer and pianist Jan Boquist.

=== Initial success in the 1970s ===
Following some success with her LP, Andersson made her television debut at age 15 in April 1971 in Hylands hörna with Är det konstigt att man längtar bort nån gång (I'm Gonna Be a Country Girl Again), a song written by Buffy Sainte-Marie with Swedish lyrics by Stig Anderson. This song hit number one on Sweden's "Top Hits" chart almost immediately and led to Andersson being launched quickly to some fame in Sweden. She conducted a public park tour in the same year with 79 engagements around Sweden. Her early 1970s success continued when she took an active part in Melodifestivalen 1972 with the song Säg det med en sång (Say it with a song), for which she took third place. In 1972, she released an LP in Japan including two songs in Japanese and in the same years she attended (together with Björn and Benny of ABBA fame) the "Tokyo Music Festival", performing "Better To Have Loved" and receiving first prize. For a period thereafter, she featured as a background singer for ABBA, including performances in 1977's ABBA: The Movie. The same year she also participated in the Melodifestivalen, the annual Swedish music competition to determine the country's representative at the Eurovision Song Contest with the song "Det bästa som finns (The Best There Is)" (written by Kenneth and Ted Gärdestad), finishing in eighth place.

=== Later life ===
In the early 1980s, Andersson produced a few pop singles together with guitarist Lars Finberg (Tonight, Lay Baby Lay, Build Me Up and Inspiration). Despite some success with these singles, her output of professional releases decreased thereafter. Her last release (excepting compilation albums in 1991 and 2002) was Tonight (with B-side Coming Through), released in 1983. In 1997 she moved from Uppsala to Småland and worked together with pianist Magnus Eklof, amongst others, performing live regularly over the next four years. In 1999, she moved to Västervik and was then a member of the Livets Ord ("Word of Life") Christian religious movement. In 2001, her last year in Sweden, she played with the NIZZAN Jazz Band in her old home town of Halmstad. In 2015 she released a CD and did a small club tour.

=== Current life ===
On 26 May 2001, she married American songwriter and producer, Tobe Hubbard in Påskallavik Church and now adopted the surname Andersson-Hubbard. She moved on 22 August 2001 to the United States, a few miles north of San Diego, California. In April 2007, she moved with her husband after he was appointed as a children's pastor in the city of Turlock. Then they felt they needed to be closer to family and so moved to Phoenix, Arizona in 2011 where they both are working on her music with new friends from the 'valley of the sun'. She continues to sing, focusing on writing new music, authoring for various publications, and performing at church functions, festivals, medium to larger venues, as a choir member, a worship leader and as the main draw. In July 2015 she released her latest solo single Straight Line which replaced all of her past songs in iTunes.

== Discography ==
=== Albums ===
Year	Title	Peak position
Year	Title	SWE
1971	Lena, 15	6
1971	Lena	—
1972	12 nya visor	—
1972	Kawaisonako	—
1977	Det bästa som finns	—
2015	Open Your Heart	—
