= Family Four =

Swedish band

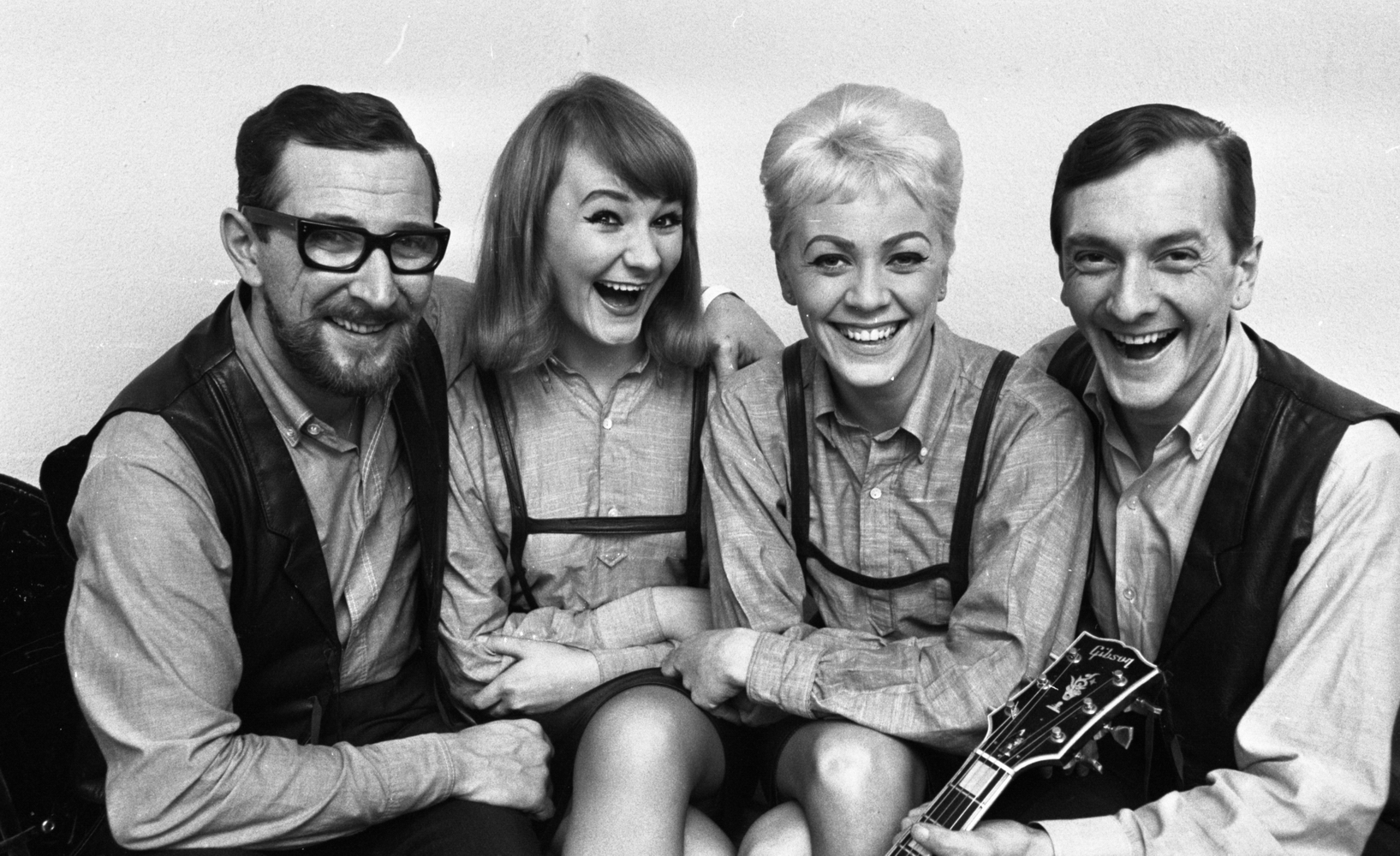
- Family Four in 1966

Background information
- Origin: Stockholm, Sweden
- Genres: Pop; schlager
- Years active: 1964–1989
- Past members: Berndt Öst; Inger Öst; Siw Öst; Stig Öst

Family Four were a Swedish pop group who recorded during the 1960s and 1970s. They were made up of Berndt Öst, Marie Bergman, Agnetha Munther and Pierre Isacsson. They won Melodifestivalen twice, in 1971 with "Vita vidder" and in 1972 with "Härliga sommardag". They went on to represent Sweden in the Eurovision Song Contest on these two occasions. They finished sixth in 1971 and 13th in 1972. They also represented their home country Sweden at the opening ceremony of the 1974 FIFA World Cup.

Both Marie Bergman and Pierre Isacsson went on to have successful solo careers, before the latter's death in the sinking of the MS Estonia in the Baltic Sea in 1994. The same year, the former represented their home country in the Eurovision Song Contest in Dublin.

== Discography ==
- 1971 (1971)
- Family Four's jul (1971)
- Picknick (1972)
- Family Four på Berns (1973)
- Family Four: Guldkorn (2000)
