= Eurovision Song Contest 1972 =

International song competition

Date and venue
- Final: 25 March 1972
- Venue: Usher Hall; Edinburgh, United Kingdom

Organisation
- Organiser: European Broadcasting Union (EBU)
- Scrutineer: Clifford Brown

Production
- Host broadcaster: British Broadcasting Corporation (BBC)
- Producer: Terry Hughes
- Executive producer: Bill Cotton
- Musical director: Malcolm Lockyer
- Presenter: Moira Shearer

Participants
- Number of entries: 18
- Participation map: Competing countries Countries that participated in the past but not in 1972

Vote
- Voting system: Two-member juries from each country; each juror scored each song between one and five
- Winning song: Luxembourg "Après toi"

The Eurovision Song Contest 1972 was the 17th edition of the Eurovision Song Contest, held on 25 March 1972 at the Usher Hall in Edinburgh, United Kingdom (UK), presented by Moira Shearer and organised by the European Broadcasting Union (EBU). The British Broadcasting Corporation (BBC) staged the event after Télé Monte-Carlo (TMC), which had won the 1971 contest for Monaco, declined hosting responsibilities, citing the lack of a suitable venue, technical limitations, and related costs. The Spanish and German broadcasters, which had placed second and third in 1971 respectively, also declined the offer to host, so the BBC stepped in to stage the 1972 contest after no other offers were received. It was the first, and as of 2026 only, edition of the contest to take place in Scotland, as well as being the only time that a UK-hosted edition of the contest has been held outside England.

Broadcasters from a total of eighteen countries – the same line-up as had competed the previous year – participated. The winner was Luxembourg, represented by the song "Après toi", composed by Klaus Munro and Leo Leandros under the pseudonym Mario Panas, written by Leandros and Yves Dessca, and performed by Leandros's daughter Vicky. It was Luxembourg's third contest victory, following wins in 1961 and 1965. The United Kingdom, Germany, the Netherlands and Austria rounded out the top five, with the UK achieving its record-extending eighth runner-up position and Germany placing third for the third year in succession. Portugal achieved its best result to date, with a seventh-place finish, while Malta placed last for the second year in a row.

There were several firsts associated with the 1972 contest: technologically, it was the first to use a wall-size screen to introduce the performers and their songs as they came on stage, as well as during the performances and the voting sequence; Ireland's entry, "Ceol an Ghrá", was the first and so far only entry as of 2026 to be performed predominantly in the Irish language; Dessca's lyrics for "Aprés toi" made him not only the first person to be involved with the winning song in consecutive years (he had been the lyricist for Monaco's 1971 winner, "Un banc, un arbre, une rue"), but the first person to win with songs from different countries; and the 1972 contest was also the first to be broadcast in Asia.

== Location ==
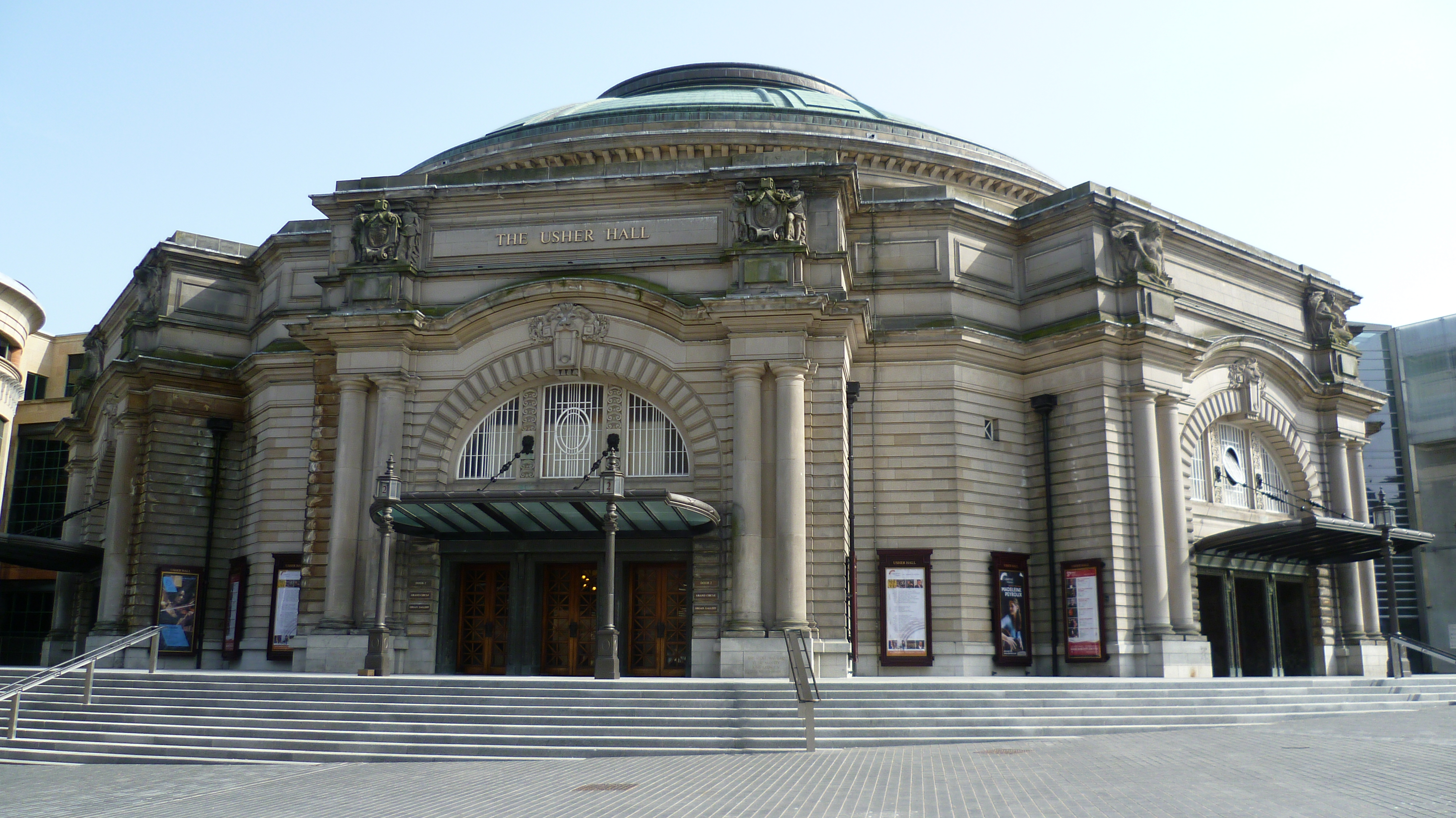
The Usher Hall, Edinburgh – host venue of the 1972 contest

The 1972 contest was held in Edinburgh, United Kingdom. It was the fourth time the UK had hosted the contest, following the 1960, 1963, and 1968 editions. It was the first UK contest staged outside of London, and the first, and as of 2026 only, contest held in Scotland, as well as the only contest held in the UK outside of England. The selected venue was the Usher Hall, a concert hall opened in 1914. Around 1,500 people were present in the audience during the contest.

=== Host selection ===
The 1971 contest was won by Monaco, represented by Télé Monte-Carlo (TMC), with the song "Un banc, un arbre, une rue" performed by Séverine, which according to Eurovision tradition made TMC the presumptive host of the 1972 contest. This was the first contest Monaco had won. Afterwards the Monégasque broadcaster announced its intention to stage the event in 1972, which would have been the first contest staged in the principality. As Monaco had no suitable television studio or contest venue large enough, TMC proposed hosting the contest at an outdoor location in June 1972. An indoor venue was also reportedly already under construction, which TMC hoped to expedite.

The European Broadcasting Union (EBU) held parallel discussions with other member broadcasters to determine suitable options in other countries. Spain and Germany had placed second and third in 1971, but their broadcasters told the EBU they were not interested, with Televisión Española (TVE) citing its staging of the contest 1969, and ARD citing its broadcast responsibilities for the upcoming Olympic Games in Munich. The BBC had also suggested that France's Office de Radiodiffusion Télévision Française (ORTF) could host, since it had lost out on staging the 1970 contest to the Netherlands in the draw between them and Dutch Nederlandse Televisie Stichting (NTS) following the four-way 1969 tie for first place.

The EBU subsequently declared the event had to be held in either March or April, precluding TMC's outdoor option. By July 1971, TMC declared they would be unable to host at all due to the lack of a suitable venue, as well as the costs and technical limitations. At this stage no firm alternate offers had been received by the EBU from other member broadcasters, leading the organisation to "call loudly" for volunteers. It looked quite possible that the contest could be cancelled. The BBC ultimately put in an offer, with Edinburgh and Blackpool considered as potential host cities, and in September 1971 Bill Cotton, the BBC's head of light entertainment, announced that the contest would be staged in the UK by the BBC if no other offers were received. The following month, Edinburgh's Usher Hall was confirmed as the venue, with 25 March as the date of the event. In his announcement, Cotton expressed a desire for the first time to host a UK-held contest outside of London, the host city on all three occasions that the event had been held in the UK.

== Participants ==
Eurovision Song Contest 1972 – Participation summaries by country
- Austria; Belgium; Finland; France; Germany; Ireland; Italy; Luxembourg; Malta; Monaco; Netherlands; Norway; Portugal; Spain; Sweden; Switzerland; United Kingdom; Yugoslavia

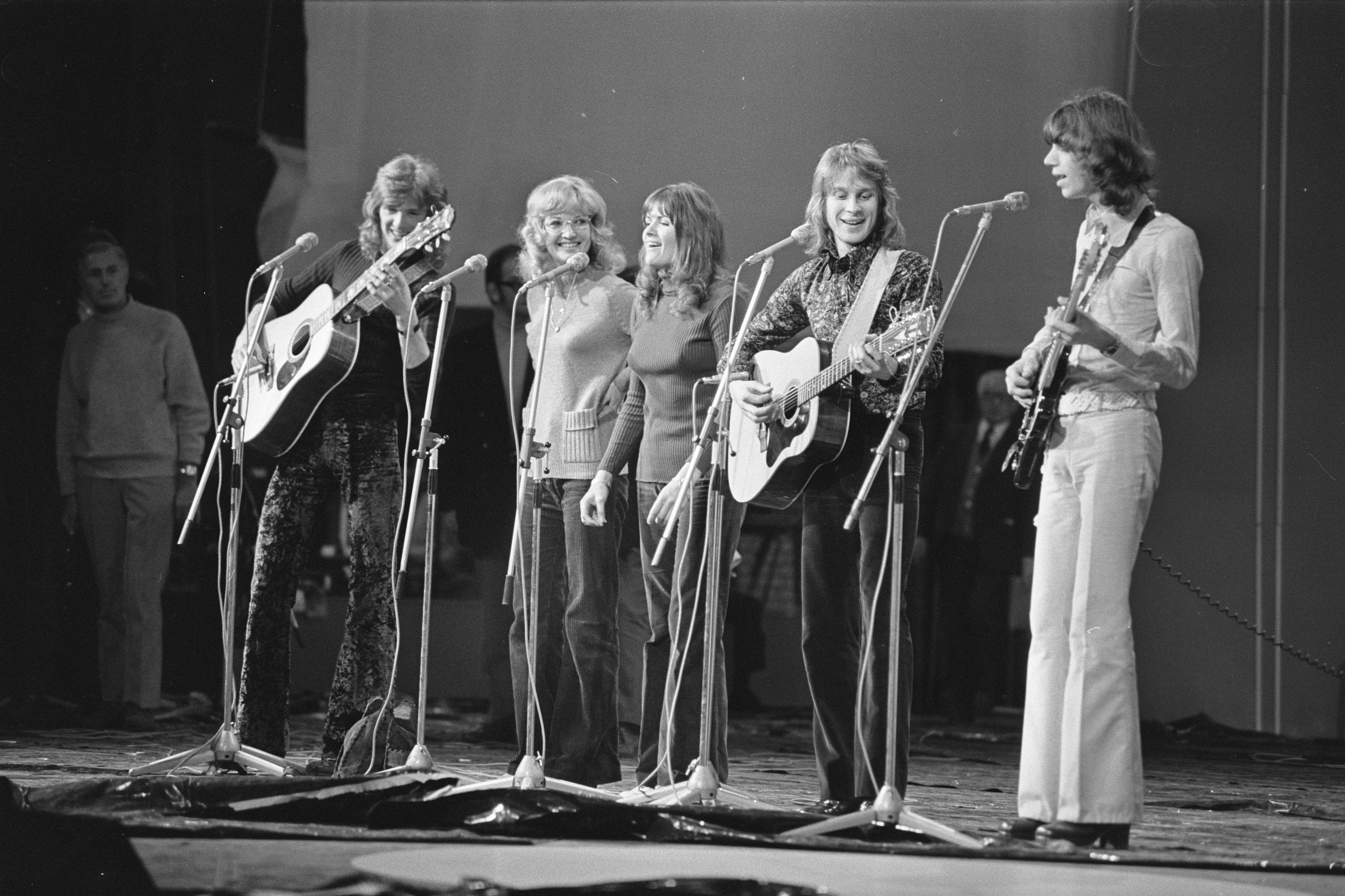
The New Seekers, the first group to represent the United Kingdom, had previously achieved massive worldwide success, including with the song "I'd Like to Teach the World to Sing (In Perfect Harmony)".

The same eighteen countries which had participated in 1971 returned.

Several of the performing artists had participated in previous editions of the Eurovision Song Contest. Greek singer Vicky Leandros, representing Luxembourg, had previously represented the nation in 1967; Carlos Mendes had represented Portugal in 1968; the Family Four, who had represented Sweden in 1971, returned for a second consecutive year; and Tereza Kesovija, representing Yugoslavia, had previously represented Monaco in 1966. Additionally, Claude Lombard, who had represented Belgium in 1968, returned as a backing singer for the Belgian entry at this year's event. Ireland's entry was the first, and as of 2026 only, song in the contest's history to have been performed in the Irish language.

Eurovision Song Contest 1972 participants
Country	Broadcaster	Artist	Song	Language	Songwriter(s)	Conductor
Austria	ORF	The Milestones	"Falter im Wind"	German	Manuel Rigoni; Richard Schönherz; Heinz Rudolf Unger	Erich Kleinschuster
Belgium	RTB	Serge and Christine Ghisoland	"À la folie ou pas du tout"	French	Bob Milan; Daniël Nelis	Henri Segers
Finland	YLE	Päivi Paunu and Kim Floor	"Muistathan"	Finnish	Juha Flinck; Nacke Johansson	Ossi Runne
France	ORTF	Betty Mars	"Comé-comédie"	French	Frédéric Botton	Franck Pourcel
Germany	SFB (Note: On behalf of the German public broadcasting consortium ARD)	Mary Roos	"Nur die Liebe läßt uns leben"	German	Joachim Heider; Joachim Relin	Paul Kuhn
Ireland	RTÉ	Sandie Jones	"Ceol an Ghrá"	Irish	Joe Burkett; Liam Mac Uistín	Colman Pearce
Italy	RAI	Nicola Di Bari	"I giorni dell'arcobaleno"	Italian	Nicola Di Bari; Dalmazio Masini; Piero Pintucci	Gian Franco Reverberi
Luxembourg	CLT	Vicky Leandros	"Après toi"	French	Yves Dessca; Klaus Munro; Mario Panas	Klaus Munro
Malta	MBA	Helen and Joseph	"L-imħabba"	Maltese	Albert Cassola; Charles Camilleri	Charles Camilleri
Monaco	TMC	Anne-Marie Godart and Peter MacLane	"Comme on s'aime"	French	Raymond Bernard; Jean Dréjac	Raymond Bernard
Netherlands	NOS	Sandra and Andres	"Als het om de liefde gaat"	Dutch	Hans van Hemert; Dries Holten	Harry van Hoof
Norway	NRK	Grethe Kausland and Benny Borg	"Småting"	Norwegian	Ivar Børsum; Kåre Grøttum	Carsten Klouman
Portugal	RTP	Carlos Mendes	"A festa da vida"	Portuguese	José Calvário; José Niza	Richard Hill
Spain	TVE	Jaime Morey	"Amanece"	Spanish	Augusto Algueró; Ramón Arcusa	Augusto Algueró
Sweden	SR	The Family Four	"Härliga sommardag"	Swedish	Håkan Elmquist	Mats Olsson
Switzerland	SRG SSR	Véronique Müller	"C'est la chanson de mon amour"	French	Catherine Desage; Véronique Müller	Jean-Pierre Festi
United Kingdom	BBC	The New Seekers	"Beg, Steal or Borrow"	English	Tony Cole; Graeme Hall; Steve Wolfe	David Mackay
Yugoslavia	JRT	Tereza	"Muzika i ti" (Музика и ти)	Serbo-Croatian	Nikica Kalogjera; Ivica Krajač	Nikica Kalogjera

== Production and format ==
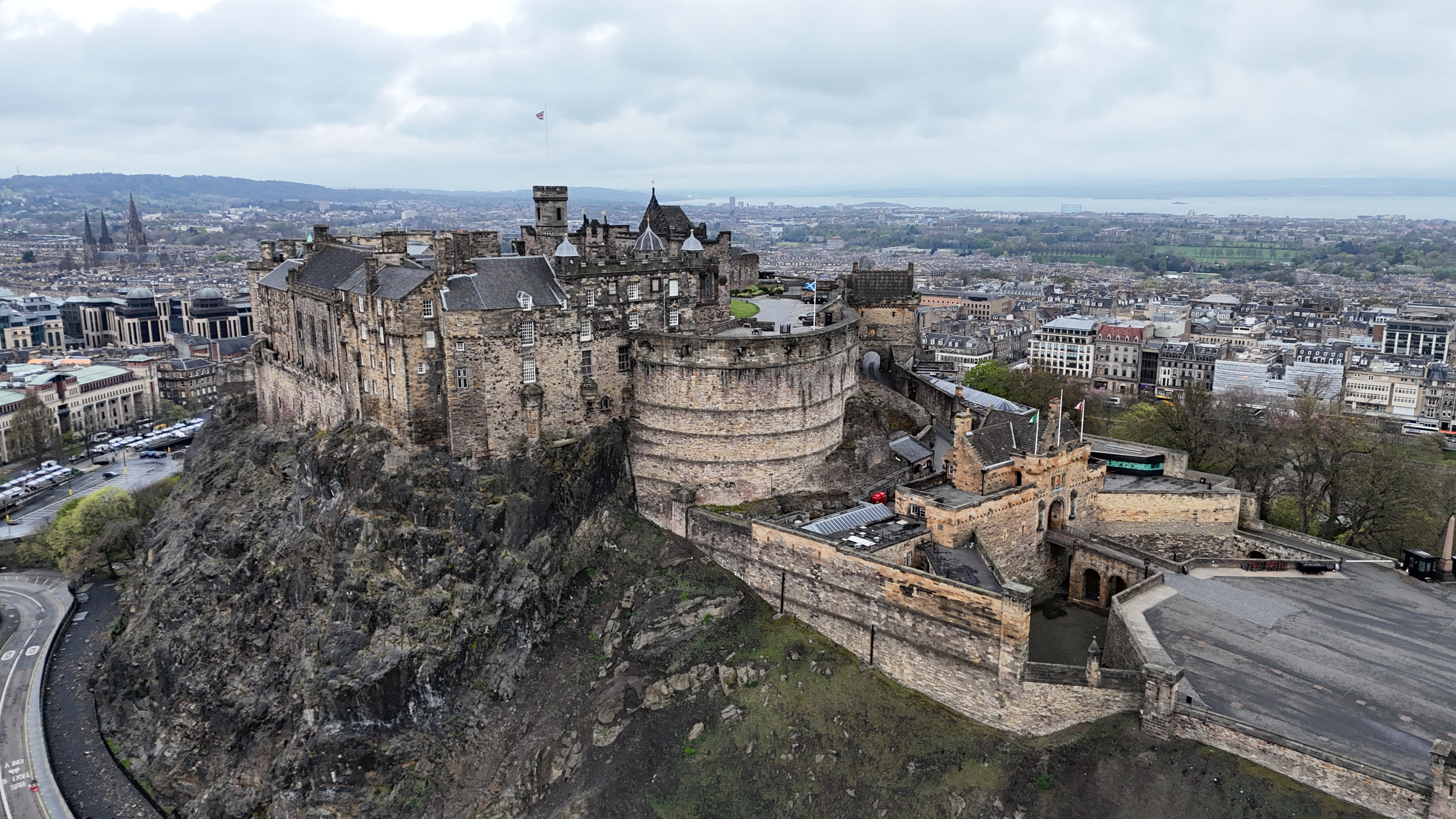
Edinburgh Castle

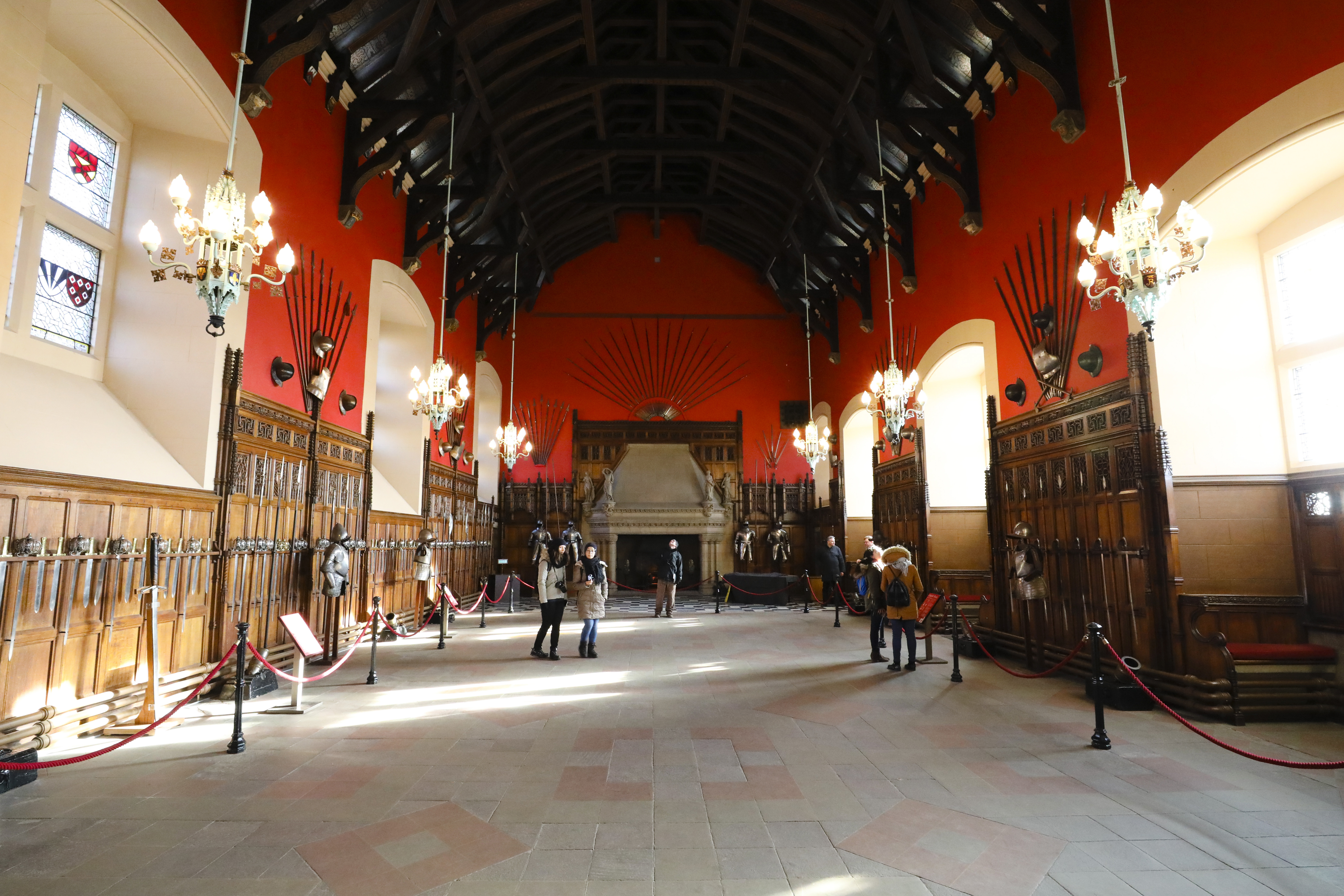
The voting sequence was conducted from the Great Hall of Edinburgh Castle

The Eurovision Song Contest 1972 was produced by the BBC. Cotton served as executive producer, Terry Hughes as producer and director, Brian Tregidden as designer, and Malcolm Lockyer as musical director, leading the 44-piece BBC Radio Orchestra. A separate musical director could be nominated by each participating delegation to lead the orchestra during its country's performance, with the host musical director also available to conduct for those countries which did not nominate their own conductor. On behalf of the EBU, the event was overseen by Clifford Brown as scrutineer. The contest was presented by the Scottish ballet dancer and actor Moira Shearer.

Each participating broadcaster submitted one song, no more than three minutes long, performed in the language, or one of the languages, of the country it represented. Up to six performers were allowed on stage during each country's performance. Following the confirmation of the eighteen participating countries, the draw to determine the running order (R/O) of the contest was held on 1 December 1971 in London, and announced by the BBC at the end of December 1971.

The voting system introduced at the previous year's contest returned: each participating broadcaster appointed two individuals – one aged 16–25, the other 26–55, at least 10 years apart – who awarded each song 1–5 votes, except for the one from their own country. For this year's edition the jurors were kept in a separate location during the contest, in the Great Hall of Edinburgh Castle, where they followed the contest on television. After each country's performance they were required to record their votes, so that they could not be altered later. During the voting sequence they were shown on screen, with the scores announced by the jurors themselves in blocks of three countries. The voting sequence was projected in black-and-white with an Eidophor projector onto an screen in the Usher Hall for the benefit of the audience. This screen was also used during the contest itself to introduce the artists with a colour photograph of themselves and song titles, as well as during the performances. This was the first time that a wall-size screen was used on stage in the contest.

Rehearsals in the venue began on 21 March. The competing delegations took part in rehearsals beginning on 22 March, with each country taking part in two technical rehearsal sessions across the following days. Technical checks and rehearsals were also conducted with Shearer, and jurors and the scoreboard ahead of the live transmission.

== Contest overview ==
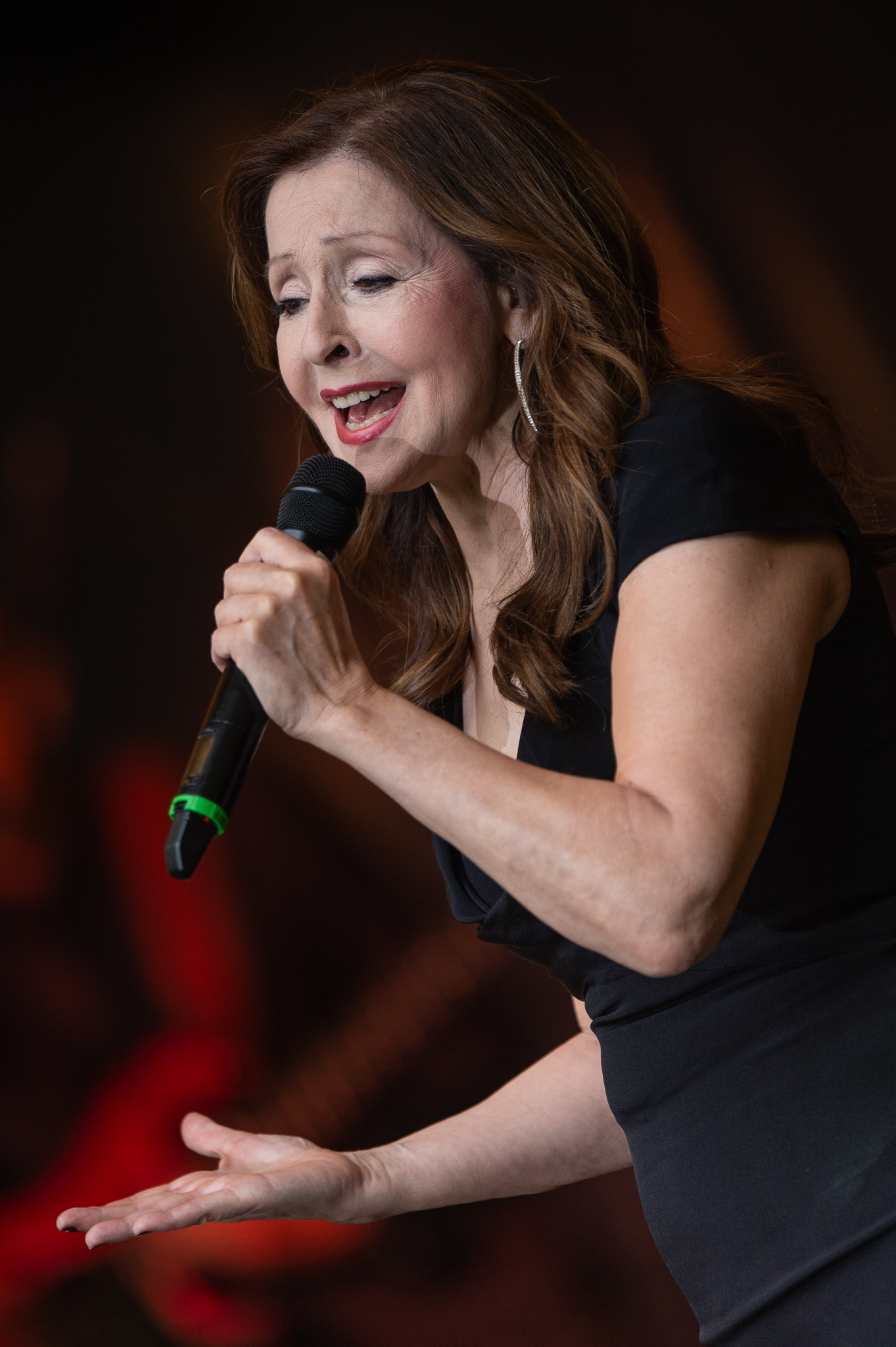
The Greek-born singer Vicky Leandros (pictured in 2018) became the third artist to win the contest for Luxembourg.

The contest was held on 25 March, beginning at 21:30 (BST) and lasting 1 hour and 45 minutes.

Following an introductory prerecorded video montage of various Edinburgh locations, Shearer was played onto the stage by a fanfare composed by Lockyer, fanfare he had written as the opening title music of the film Dr. Who and the Daleks, which he had scored. The interval entertainment between the competing songs and the voting segment was a four-minute segment with footage taken from the 1968 Edinburgh Military Tattoo, featuring the massed pipes and drums of eight Scottish regiments marching to "The Inverness Gathering". The prize for the winning artist and songwriters was presented by the previous year's winning artist, Séverine. Before the Monégasque entry a planned camera cut showed Séverine sitting in the audience, a shot that became somewhat infamous after she was seen glancing down at her watch in apparent boredom.

The winner was Luxembourg, represented by the song "Après toi", composed by Klaus Munro and Leo Leandros under the pseudonym Mario Panas, with lyrics by Leandros and Yves Dessca, performed by Greek singer Vicky Leandros, Leo's daughter. It was Luxembourg's third contest victory, following wins in 1961 and 1965. Dessca had also provided the lyrics to the previous year's winning song "Un banc, un arbre, une rue" for Monaco and thus became the first person to win back-to-back contests and to win for multiple countries. Vicky Leandros had previously represented Luxembourg in 1967, where she had performed mononymously and placed fourth with the song "L'amour est bleu". The United Kingdom finished in second place for a record-extending eighth time, while Germany placed third for the third straight year. Further down the scoreboard Portugal, in seventh, achieved its best-ever result up to that point, while Malta finished in last place as it had the previous year.

Two separate disturbances occurred on the evening of the event. Before the contest began, a local headmaster began shouting towards the stage at a BBC producer who was welcoming the audience, complaining that local schoolchildren were unable to attend the event and that they would have appreciated it more than the largely invited audience members. Later on, during the Irish and Spanish songs, another man was seen scattering a substance among the audience close to the Irish delegation as a protest against the commercialisation of the music industry, which led to small explosions and a brief partial evacuation of the venue by police and the military.

Results of the Eurovision Song Contest 1972
R/O	Country	Artist	Song	Votes	Place
1	Germany	Mary Roos	"Nur die Liebe läßt uns leben"	107	3
2	France	Betty Mars	"Comé-comédie"	81	11
3	Ireland	Sandie Jones	"Ceol an Ghrá"	72	15
4	Spain	Jaime Morey	"Amanece"	83	10
5	United Kingdom	The New Seekers	"Beg, Steal or Borrow"	114	2
6	Norway	Grethe Kausland and Benny Borg	"Småting"	73	14
7	Portugal	Carlos Mendes	"A festa da vida"	90	7
8	Switzerland	Véronique Müller	"C'est la chanson de mon amour"	88	8
9	Malta	Helen and Joseph	"L-imħabba"	48	18
10	Finland	Päivi Paunu and Kim Floor	"Muistathan"	78	12
11	Austria	The Milestones	"Falter im Wind"	100	5
12	Italy	Nicola Di Bari	"I giorni dell'arcobaleno"	92	6
13	Yugoslavia	Tereza	"Muzika i ti"	87	9
14	Sweden	The Family Four	"Härliga sommardag"	75	13
15	Monaco	Anne-Marie Godart and Peter MacLane	"Comme on s'aime"	65	16
16	Belgium	Serge and Christine Ghisoland	"À la folie ou pas du tout"	55	17
17	Luxembourg	Vicky Leandros	"Après toi"	128	1
18	Netherlands	Sandra and Andres	"Als het om de liefde gaat"	106	4

== Detailed voting results ==
Jury voting was used to determine the votes awarded by all countries. The announcement of the results from each country's two jury members was conducted in the order in which their nation performed; the jurors were shown on camera when presenting their scores, with each juror using small boards in front of their desks with numbers 1 to 5 which they flipped up to reveal their votes for the country being awarded. The results of three countries at a time were totalled and presented as one score, with all eighteen countries receiving their scores before moving on to the next three countries to award their scores. The detailed breakdown of the votes awarded by each country is listed in the tables below, with voting countries listed in the order they presented their votes.

Detailed voting results
		Total score	Germany	France	Ireland	Spain	United Kingdom	Norway	Portugal	Switzerland	Malta	Finland	Austria	Italy	Yugoslavia	Sweden	Monaco	Belgium	Luxembourg	Netherlands
Contestants	Germany	107		8	6	9	5	6	6	5	4	5	5	7	5	8	8	7	7	6
Contestants	France	81	5		5	2	9	7	2	3	5	4	2	3	5	2	6	7	8	6
Contestants	Ireland	72	4	3		4	4	6	4	3	6	3	4	3	3	5	5	4	6	5
Contestants	Spain	83	7	5	5		3	8	6	3	4	4	5	3	2	7	8	3	5	5
Contestants	United Kingdom	114	8	9	6	2		**10**	4	8	2	7	7	7	9	6	9	4	8	8
Contestants	Norway	73	4	3	6	5	4		5	2	5	7	3	2	5	4	4	4	6	4
Contestants	Portugal	90	3	4	7	7	4	2		6	5	2	4	9	4	7	4	7	**10**	5
Contestants	Switzerland	88	4	5	6	5	4	7	2		4	7	8	5	5	4	6	4	7	5
Contestants	Malta	48	3	2	4	2	6	2	2	2		5	2	2	2	3	3	2	2	4
Contestants	Finland	78	4	3	3	6	5	6	4	3	3		3	3	4	4	5	8	6	8
Contestants	Austria	100	6	6	6	6	3	5	5	7	5	4		6	8	**10**	5	4	5	9
Contestants	Italy	92	4	5	3	2	3	6	7	9	6	6	6		4	8	6	6	6	5
Contestants	Yugoslavia	87	7	4	5	8	5	4	5	2	4	3	3	2		4	9	8	8	6
Contestants	Sweden	75	5	3	5	3	3	5	4	2	4	5	4	3	7		5	7	5	5
Contestants	Monaco	65	4	3	4	3	5	6	2	2	5	5	3	3	4	3		4	4	5
Contestants	Belgium	55	2	3	4	2	5	2	3	3	5	4	2	3	2	2	4		6	3
Contestants	Luxembourg	**128**	9	8	9	2	**10**	8	7	6	4	6	8	9	**10**	8	7	8		9
Contestants	Netherlands	106	6	6	8	8	9	8	5	6	3	9	6	3	9	6	5	2	7	

=== 10 votes ===
The below table summarises where the potential maximum of 10 votes were awarded from one country to another. The winning country is shown in bold. Luxembourg received the maximum score of 10 votes from two of the voting countries, and Austria, Portugal and the United Kingdom received one set of 10 votes each.

Distribution of 10 votes awarded at the Eurovision Song Contest 1972
N.	Contestant	Nation(s) giving 10 votes
2	**Luxembourg**	United Kingdom, Yugoslavia
1	Austria	Sweden
1	Portugal	Luxembourg
1	United Kingdom	Norway

== Broadcasts ==
Broadcasters from competing countries were required to relay the contest via their networks; non-participating EBU member broadcasters were also able to relay the contest. Broadcasters were able to send commentators to provide coverage of the contest in their own native language and to relay information about the artists and songs to their television viewers.

The 1972 contest was the first to be broadcast in Asia, with newspaper reports at the time stating that the contest had been bought for transmission by broadcasters in Hong Kong, Japan, the Philippines, Taiwan and Thailand. A global audience of 400 million was expected, and in addition to the participating countries and the previously mentioned Asian nations the contest was also expected to be broadcast by EBU member broadcasters in Iceland, Israel, Morocco and Tunisia, by OIRT member broadcasters in Bulgaria, Czechoslovakia, Hungary, Poland and Romania via Intervision, and in Brazil, Chile and Zaire. Known details on the broadcasts in each country, including the specific broadcasting stations and commentators are shown in the tables below.

Broadcasters and commentators in participating countries
Country	Broadcaster	Channel(s)	Commentator(s)	Ref(s)
Austria	ORF	FS2	Ernst Grissemann	
Belgium	RTB	RTB	Paule Herreman	
Belgium	RTB	RTB 1		
Belgium	BRT	BRT		
Finland	YLE	TV-ohjelma 1		
Finland	YLE	Yleisohjelma	Matti Paalosmaa	
Finland	YLE	Ruotsinkielinen ohjelma	Åke Grandell	
France	ORTF	Première Chaîne	Pierre Tchernia	
Germany	ARD	Deutsches Fernsehen	Hanns Verres	
Ireland	RTÉ	RTÉ	Mike Murphy	
Ireland	RTÉ	RTÉ Radio	Liam Devally and Kevin Roche	
Italy	RAI	Programma Nazionale TV, Secondo Programma	Renato Tagliani	
Luxembourg	CLT	Télé-Luxembourg	Jacques Navadic	
Malta	MBA	MTS, National Network	Norman Hamilton	
Netherlands	NOS	Nederland 1	Pim Jacobs	
Norway	NRK	NRK Fjernsynet, NRK (Note: Deferred broadcast at 22:30 (CET))	Roald Øyen	
Portugal	RTP	I Programa		
Spain	TVE	TVE 1	Julio Rico	
Spain	RNE	Radio Nacional		
Spain	RNE	Centro Emisor del Atlántico		
Spain	Cadena SER (Note: Simulcast on Radio Huesca, Radio San Sebastián, Radio Sevilla, and Radio Zaragoza.)			
Sweden	SR	TV1	Bo Billtén	
Sweden	SR	SR P3	Björn Bjelfvenstam	
Switzerland	SRG SSR	TV DRS	Theodor Haller	
Switzerland	SRG SSR	TSR	Georges Hardy	
Switzerland	SRG SSR	TSI		
Switzerland	SRG SSR	DRS 1 (Note: Delayed broadcast on 27 March 1972 at 22:30 (CET))		
Switzerland	SRG SSR	RSR 2	Robert Burnier	
United Kingdom	BBC	BBC1	Tom Fleming	
United Kingdom	BBC	BBC Radio 2 (Note: Simulcast on BBC Radio 1, BBC Radio Birmingham, BBC Radio Blackburn, BBC Radio Brighton, BBC Radio Durham, BBC Radio Leicester, BBC Radio London, BBC Radio Manchester, BBC Radio Medway, BBC Radio Merseyside, BBC Radio Newcastle, BBC Radio Stoke-on-Trent, and BBC Radio Teesside.)	Pete Murray	
United Kingdom	BFBS	BFBS Radio (Note: Delayed broadcast in Akrotiri and Dhekelia on 2 April 1972 at 20:45 (EET))	Terry James	
Yugoslavia	JRT	TV Beograd 1, TV Zagreb 1	Oliver Mlakar	
Yugoslavia	JRT	TV Koper-Capodistria		
Yugoslavia	JRT	TV Ljubljana 1		

Broadcasters and commentators in non-participating countries
Country	Broadcaster	Channel(s)	Commentator(s)	Ref(s)
Brazil	Rede Tupi	TV Tupi Rio de Janeiro		
Brazil	Rede Tupi	TV Paraná		
Czechoslovakia	ČST	I. program, II. program (Note: Experimental colour broadcast on II. program)	Blažena Kočtúchová	
Greece	EIRT	EIRT		
Hungary	MTV	MTV (Note: Delayed broadcast on 5 April 1972 at 20:45 (CET))		
Iceland	RÚV	Sjónvarpið (Note: Delayed broadcast on 17 April 1972 at 20:30 (WET))	Björn Matthíasson	
Romania	TVR	Programul 1 (Note: Deferred broadcast in a shortened format on 5 May 1972 at 22:15 (EET))		

== Notes and references ==
=== Bibliography and videography ===
- BBC (25 March 1972). Eurovision Song Contest 1972 (Television programme) (in English and French). Edinburgh, United Kingdom: British Broadcasting Corporation.
- O'Connor, John Kennedy (2010). The Eurovision Song Contest: The Official History (2nd ed.). London, United Kingdom: Carlton Books. ISBN 978-1-84732-521-1.
- Roxburgh, Gordon (2014). Songs for Europe: The United Kingdom at the Eurovision Song Contest. Vol. Two: The 1970s. Prestatyn, United Kingdom: Telos Publishing. ISBN 978-1-84583-093-9.
- Richard, Jean-Marc; Clapasson, Mary; Tanner, Nicolas (2017). La saga Eurovision [The Eurovision saga] (in French). Lausanne, Switzerland: Éditions Favre. ISBN 978-2-8289-1549-0.
- Thorsson, Leif; Verhage, Martin (2006). Melodifestivalen genom tiderna : de svenska uttagningarna och internationella finalerna [Melodifestivalen through the ages: the Swedish selections and international finals] (in Swedish). Stockholm, Sweden: Premium Publishing. ISBN 91-89136-29-2.
