= Marianne Mendt =

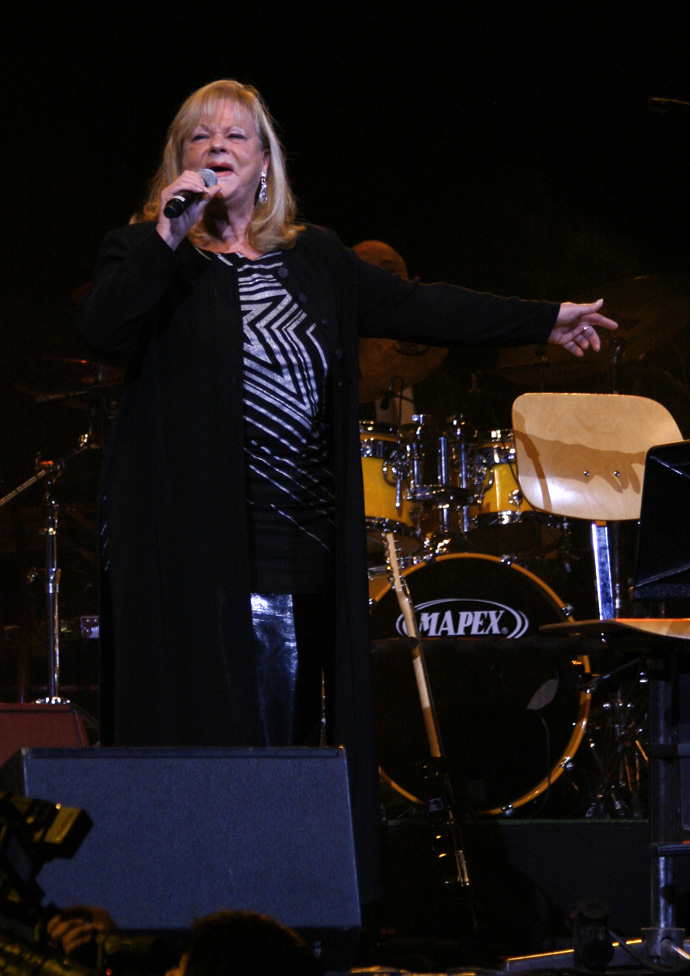
- Marianne Mendt, Vienna 2008

Background information
- Born: Marianne Krupicka; 29 September 1945 (age 80)
- Origin: Vienna, Austria
- Genres: Jazz, Pop
- Occupation: Singer
- Website: Marianne Mendt

Marianne Mendt (née Krupicka; born 29 September 1945) is an Austrian jazz singer and actress, best known for her participation in the 1971 Eurovision Song Contest.

== Early career ==
Mendt trained as a jazz singer and toured as a singer and bass player, with group the Internationals, around Europe. Back in Vienna she was noticed by talent-spotter Gerhard Bronner, who wrote for her the song "A Glock'n", which was used as the theme tune for a television drama and reached No. 12 when released as a single in 1970. Marianne Mendt published several 'Austrian versions' of well-known jazz and pop songs like Mercy, Mercy, Mercy ("I kann net lang mit dir bös' sein"), Spinning Wheel ("A g'scheckert's Hutschpferd") and Aquarius/Let the Sunshine In ("Der Wasserkopf").

== Eurovision Song Contest ==
In 1971, Mendt was chosen by broadcaster ORF to represent Austria with the song "Musik" in the 16th Eurovision Song Contest, held in Dublin on 3 April. It marked Austria's return to Eurovision following a two-year absence. "Musik" – the only song performed at Eurovision to date in the Viennese German dialect – was drawn as the show's opening song, and at the end of voting could only manage 16th place of the 18 entries.

== Later career ==
Mendt combined her singing career with acting in productions at the large Vienna theatres. In the 1990s, Mendt's acting career came to the fore, notably in the role of Gitti Schimek in TV drama Kaisermühlen Blues which ran from 1992 until 2000.

Mendt remains an active performer, regularly appearing at concerts and jazz festivals in Austria.

Preceded by Karel Gott; 1968	Austria in the Eurovision Song Contest; 1971	Succeeded by Milestones; 1972
