= Véronique Müller =

Swiss singer (born 1948)

Véronique Müller (born 9 February 1948, in Morat) is a Swiss singer and songwriter.

== Biography ==
Before her musical career, she worked as Petula Clark's secretary. She also spent time in England where she was a pupil of Freddie Winrose, who was the producer of Shirley Bassey.

She represented Switzerland in the Eurovision Song Contest 1972 with the entry "C'est la chanson de mon amour" ("This the song of my love"), where she finished in 8th place. She later co-wrote the Swiss entry in the 1980 contest, "Cinéma", performed by Paola, which placed 4th.

== Discography ==
=== Albums ===
- Y Usne Breitegrade (1984)
- Viviamo Per Amare (1990)
- Los E Mal... - Neui Lieder Für Chind Und Settegi Wo Gross Worde Sind (Unknown)
- Véronique Muller Presents International And Swiss Popular Songs (Unknown)
- Du (Unknown)
- Wie Du Und Ig (Unknown)

=== Singles & EPs ===
- C'est La Chanson De Mon Amour (1972)
- Liebe, So Heisst Meine Welt (1972)
- D'Abentür Vom Bärnhard Und Bianca (Schwyzerdütschi Version) (1977)
- Easy (1978)
- Sämeli (1978)
- Chumm Uf d'Alp! = Viens Sur l'Alpe! (1979)
- Holla Trulla (1979)
- En Ardèche (Unknown)

=== Miscellaneous ===
- Max Imal Cardinal (1998)

Awards and achievements
Preceded by Peter, Sue and Marc with "Les Illusions de nos vingt ans"	Switzerland in the Eurovision Song Contest; 1972	Succeeded by Patrick Juvet with "Je vais me marier, Marie"
