= Milestones (Austrian band) =

Austrian rock band

Milestones, also referred as The Milestones (per the Eurovision official web site), were an Austrian rock band, active between 1968 and 1975. They are known for their participation in the 1972 Eurovision Song Contest.

== 1968–1972 ==
The band's original line up was Beatrix Neundlinger, Günter Grosslercher, Robert Unterweger and Rudi Tinsobin. Their first self-titled album was released in 1970. In 1972, Unterweger and Tinsobin left the band and were replaced by Norbert Niedermeyer and Christian Kolonovits.

== Eurovision Song Contest ==
In 1972, Milestones were selected internally by broadcaster ORF as the Austrian representatives for the 17th Eurovision Song Contest with the song "Falter im Wind" ("Butterfly In the Wind"), which was a very contemporary and atypical song for Eurovision at the time. At the contest, held in Edinburgh on 25 March, "Falter im Wind" proved unexpectedly popular with the jurors, finishing in fifth place of 18 entries. It remains one of Austria's most successful Eurovision entries, as only four songs have placed higher.

== 1973–1975 ==
The band's second album, Emigration, was released in 1973. They split up in 1975; Neundlinger and Grosslercher joined the group Schmetterlinge, with which they would make another Eurovision appearance in 1977, while Niedermeyer became a member of Springtime who became Austria's Eurovision entrants in 1978. Kolonovits moved into music production.

== Discography ==
Singles

- 1969: "Einmal"
- 1970: "An diesem Freitag"
- 1971: "Paul"
- 1971: "20 Uhr 02"
- 1972: "Falter im Wind"
- 1973: "Apfelbaum"
- 1974: "Schade"

Albums

- 1970: Milestones
- 1973: Emigration

Preceded by Marianne Mendt; 1971	Austria in the Eurovision Song Contest; 1972	Succeeded by Waterloo & Robinson; 1976
