= Carlos Mendes (singer) =

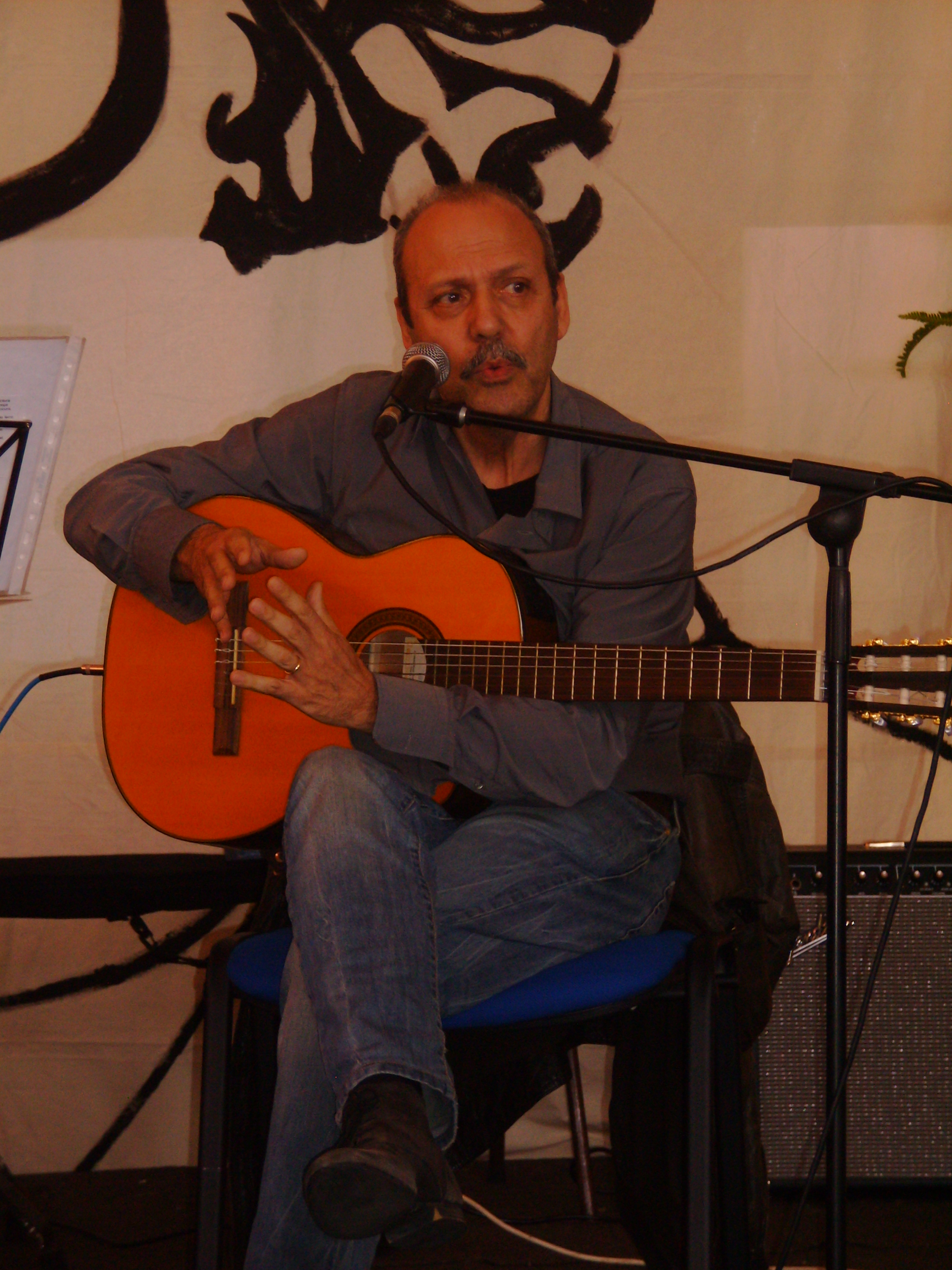

Background information
- Born: 23 May 1947 (age 79)
- Origin: Lisbon, Portugal
- Genres: Pop
- Occupation: Singer

Carlos Eduardo Teixeira Mendes (born 23 May 1947) is a Portuguese singer, best known for representing Portugal in the 1968 and 1972 Eurovision Song Contest. Mendes has also appeared in some television series.

== Albums discography ==
- Amor Combate (LP, TLD, 1976)
- Canções de Ex-Cravo e Malviver (LP, TLD, 1977)
- Jardim Jaleco (LP, Rossil, 1978)
- Antologia-(LP, Rossil, 1979)
- Antologia II (LP, Rossil, 197-)
- Triângulo do Mar (LP, Sassetti, 1980)
- Chão do Vento (LP, Edisom, 1984)
- O Natal do Pai natal
- Boa Nova (CD, 1992)
- Não Me Peças Mais Canções (CD, 1994)
- Vagabundo do Mar (CD, Movieplay, 1997)
- Coração de Cantor (CD, Lusogram, 1999)

| Preceded by Eduardo Nascimento with "O vento mudou" | Portugal in the Eurovision Song Contest; 1968 | Succeeded by Simone de Oliveira with "Desfolhada portuguesa" |
| Preceded by Tonicha with "Menina do alto da serra" | Portugal in the Eurovision Song Contest; 1972 | Succeeded by Fernando Tordo with "Tourada" |
