= Kim Floor =

Finnish singer, presenter and actor

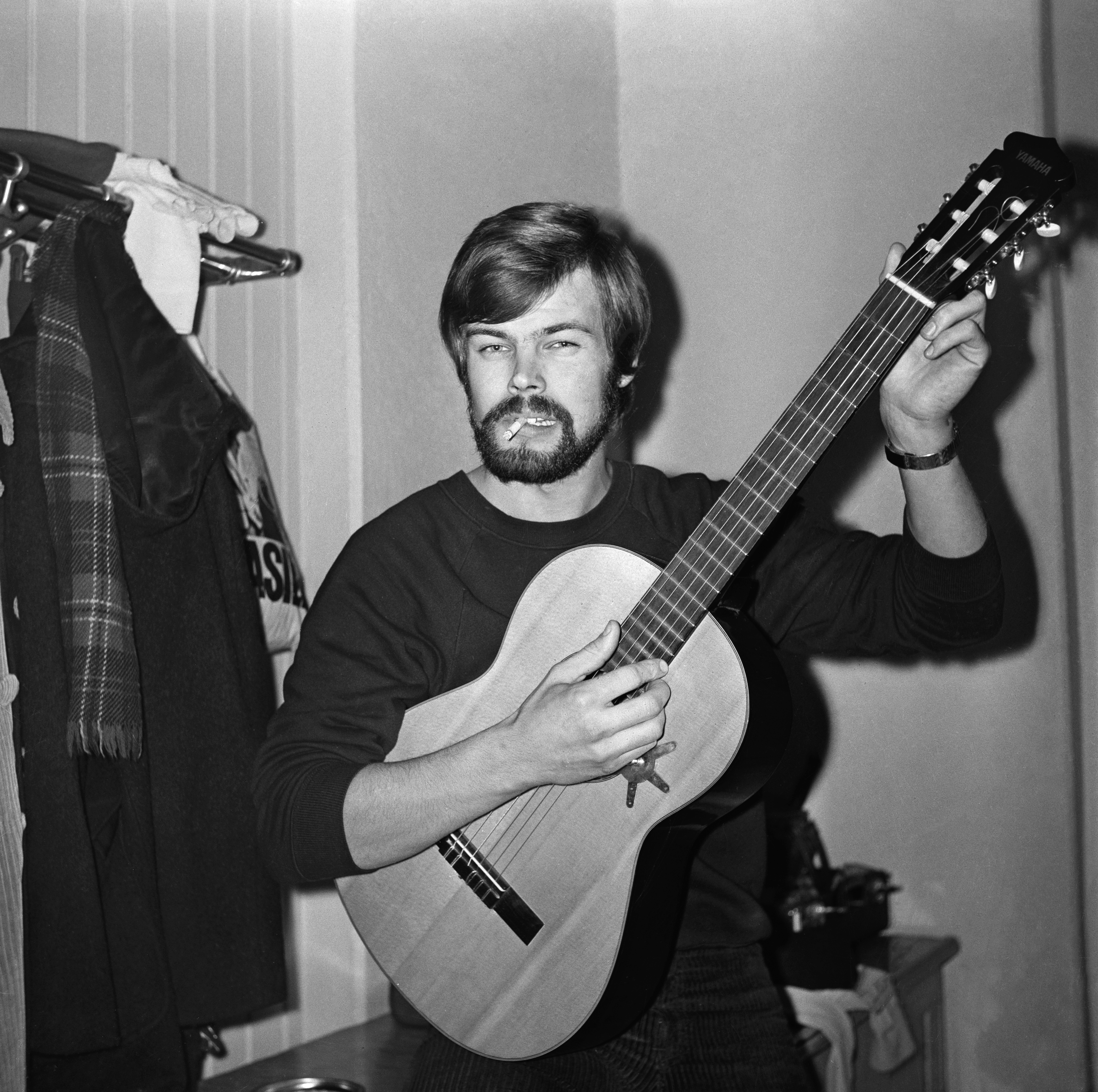
- Kim Floor in 1969
- Born: March 14, 1948 (age 77); Porvoo, Finland

Kim Floor (born 14 March 1948 in Porvoo) is a Finnish singer, actor and television host. Päivi Paunu and Kim Floor represented Finland in the Eurovision Song Contest in 1972 with the song "Muistathan" ("I Hope You Remember"). In the 1990s, Floor hosted the television game show Onnenpyörä, the Finnish version of Wheel of Fortune.

== Discography ==
=== Albums ===
- Evert Taube (1975)

Preceded by Markku Aro & Koivistolaiset with Tie uuteen päivään	Finland in the Eurovision Song Contest; 1972	Succeeded by Marion Rung with Tom Tom Tom
