= Jaime Morey =

Musical artist (1942-2015)

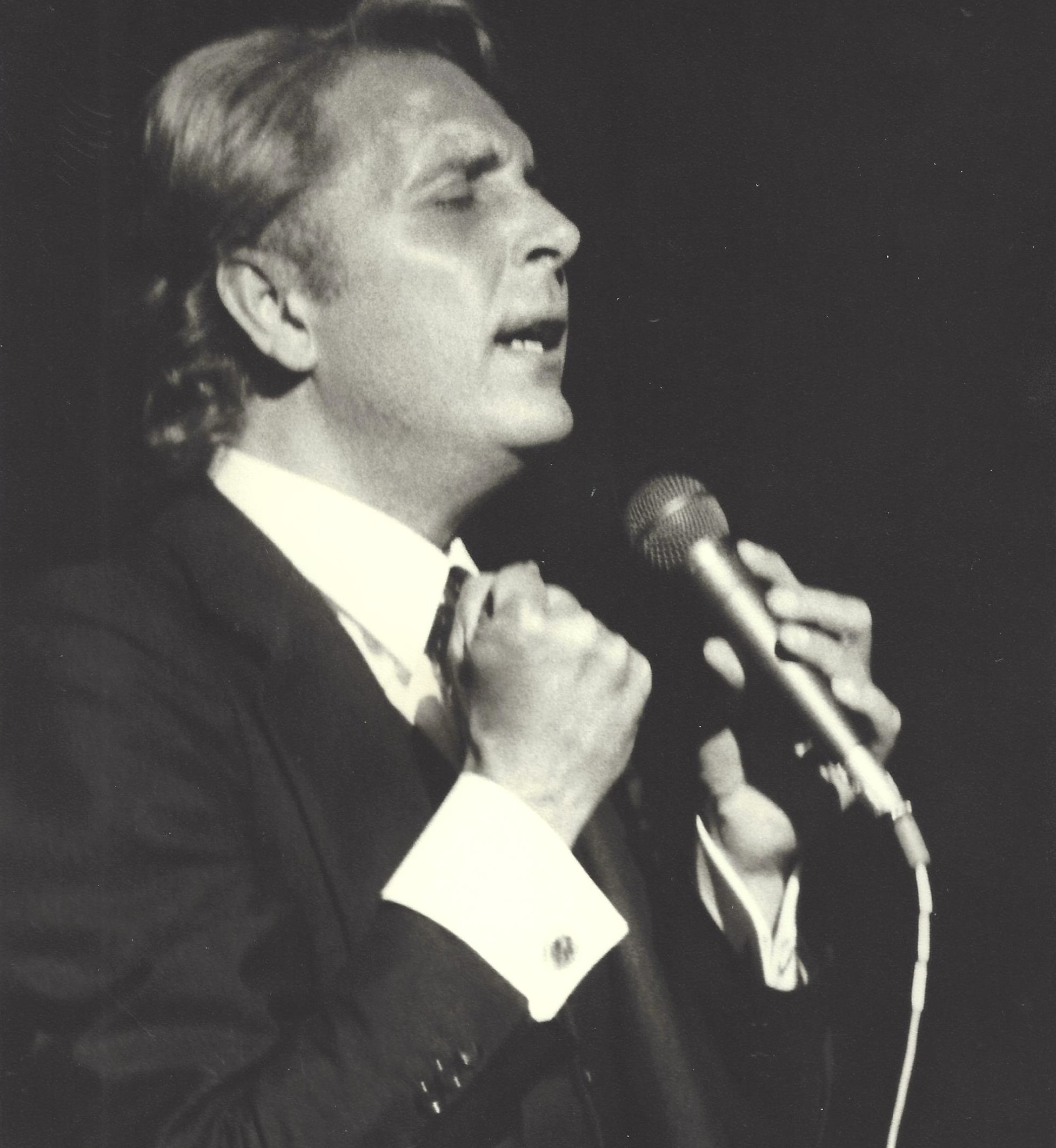
- Morey in 1982

Background information
- Born: Jaime García Morey; 16 June 1942; Alicante, Spain
- Died: 7 July 2015 (aged 73) Madrid, Spain
- Occupation: Singer
- Website: http://jaimemorey.com

Jaime García Morey (16 June 1942 – 7 July 2015), known as Jaime Morey [ˈxai̯.me ˈmo.ɾei̯], was a Spanish singer from Alicante. He represented Spain at the Eurovision Song Contest 1972 in Edinburgh with the song "Amanece". In a field of 18, he finished 10th with 83 points.

== Sources ==
- Official website

Preceded by Karina with "En un mundo nuevo"	Spain in the Eurovision Song Contest; 1972	Succeeded by Mocedades with "Eres tú"
