= Päivi Paunu =

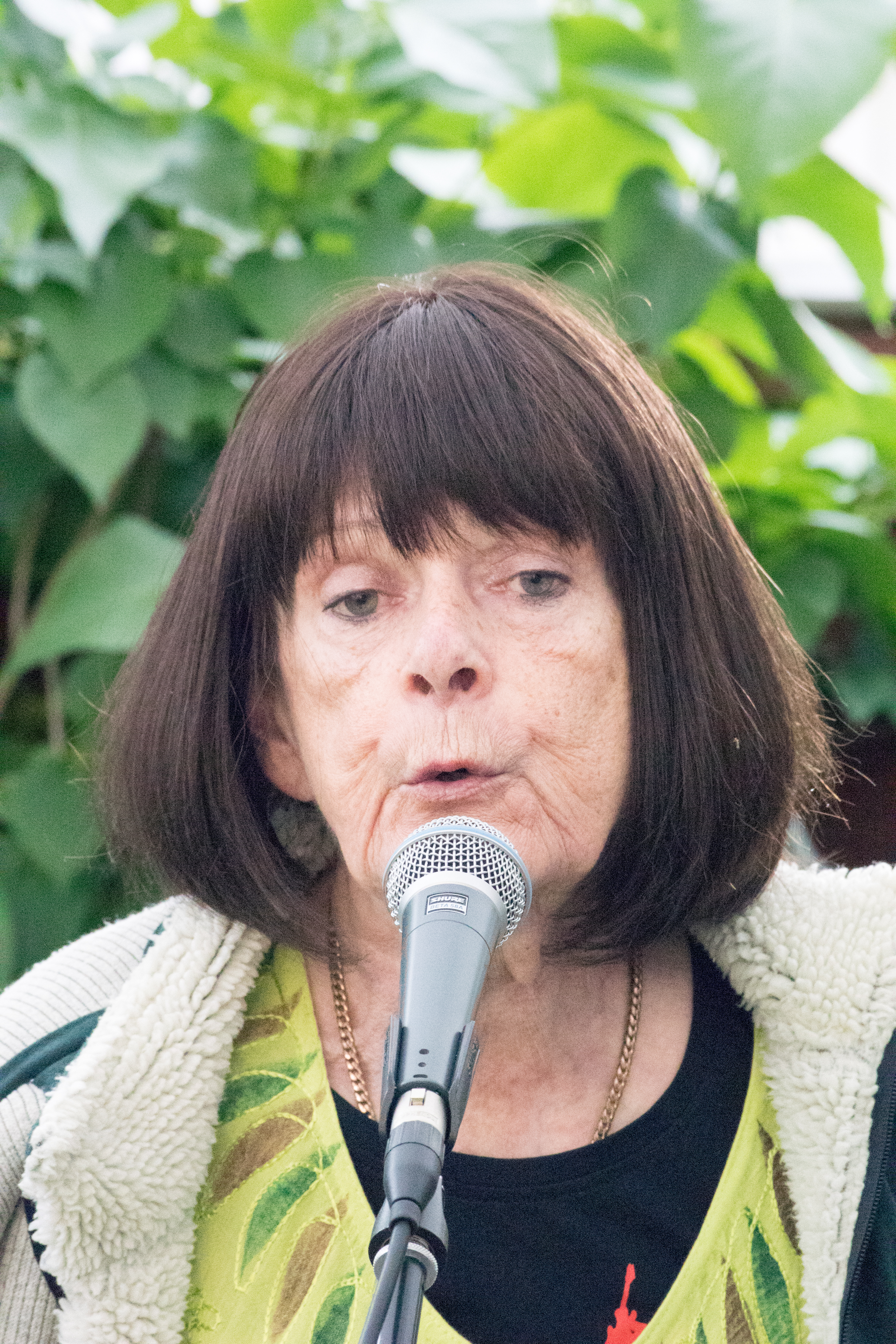
- Päivi Paunu

Background information
- Born: 20 September 1946; Helsinki, Finland
- Died: 14 December 2016 (aged 70)
- Occupation: Singer

Päivi Paunu (20 September 1946 – 14 December 2016) was a Finnish singer, born in Helsinki. Paunu and Kim Floor performed in the 1972 Eurovision contest in the United Kingdom with the song "Muistathan" ("I Hope You Remember").

== Music career ==
Päivi Paunu started as a folk singer at mid 60s singing at folk concerts in Helsinki. Asked to make records her first published single was "Aamulla varhain" / "Mene ikkunani luota" in 1966. The first single gained attention as B-side "Mene ikkunani luota" got full points at Levyraati ("Record Panel"). The single was followed by album Päivi Paunu in 1966. She died on 14 December 2016, aged 70, of cancer.

== Albums ==
- Päivi Paunu, 1966
- Päivi, 1969
- Hei vain, 1971
- Uskon päivään kauniimpaan, 1972
- Huomiseen mä luotan vieläkin, 1973
- Jos rakkaus jää, 1977
- Arkinen hartaus, 1986
- 20 suosikkia: Oi niitä aikoja, 1996

Preceded by Markku Aro & Koivistolaiset with Tie uuteen päivään	Finland in the Eurovision Song Contest; 1972	Succeeded by Marion Rung with Tom Tom Tom
