= Betty Mars =

- Born: Yvette Baheux; 30 July 1944
- Origin: Paris, France
- Died: 20 February 1989 (aged 44)
- Genres: Pop, Chanson
- Occupation: Singer
- Formerly of: Alain Barrière

Betty Mars (born Yvette Baheux, 30 July 1944 – 20 February 1989) was a French singer and actress, best known for her participation in the 1972 Eurovision Song Contest.

== Early life ==
Mars was the youngest of ten children and from an early age showed a flair for dance and acrobatics. By age 16 she was appearing in revues and spent the 1960s travelling as a lead performer in shows around Europe and the Americas.

In 1971 she was spotted singing in cabaret by composer Frédéric Botton, who offered her the song "Monsieur l'étranger" which became her first recording.

== Eurovision Song Contest ==
In 1972, Mars was chosen to sing the Botton-penned "Comé-comédie" as the French representative in the 17th Eurovision Song Contest, which took place on 25 March in Edinburgh. "Comé-comédie" is an unmistakably French chanson-style song, which finished in 11th place of 18 entries.

== Later life ==
Mars continued recording through the 1970s, including duets with Mike Brant and Alain Barrière. She moved into film work, appearing in Michel Audiard's 1974 film Bons baisers... à lundi, and Claude Lelouch's Si c'était à refaire in 1976. More notoriously, she starred in the 1975 softcore film Emilienne, which was seen as an attempt to cash in on the Emmanuelle phenomenon of the time. She had a daughter, Marie-Laure.

== Death ==
Reportedly beset by emotional and financial problems, Mars jumped from a window of her flat in La Défense on 31 January 1989. She died three weeks later, on 20 February in the Foch Hospital at Suresnes. She was survived by her 18 year old daughter, Marie-Laure.

Preceded by Serge Lama with "Un jardin sur la terre"	France in the Eurovision Song Contest; 1972	Succeeded by Martine Clemenceau with "Sans toi"
