= Après toi =

1972 song by Vicky Leandros

"Après Toi"
- German release sleeve

Single by Vicky Leandros

from the album Vicky Leandros
- Language: French
- B-side: "La Poupée, Le Prince Et La Maison" (several countries); "Después de ti" (Spain and Latin America)
- Released: 1972
- Genre: Chanson
- Length: 3:31
- Label: Philips
- Composers: Mario Panas; Klaus Munro
- Lyricist: Yves Dessca
- Producer: Leo Leandros

Eurovision Song Contest 1972 entry
- Country: Luxembourg
- Artist: Vicky Leandros
- Language: French
- Composers: Mario Panas; Klaus Munro
- Lyricist: Yves Dessca
- Conductor: Klaus Munro

Finals performance
- Final result: 1st
- Final points: 128

Entry chronology
- ◄ "Pomme, pomme, pomme" (1971)
- "Tu te reconnaîtras" (1973) ►

Official performance video
- "Après toi" on YouTube

"Après toi" (French pronunciation: [apʁɛ twa]; "After you") is a song recorded by Greek singer Vicky Leandros, with music composed by her father Leo Leandros under his pseudonym Mario Panas, and German composer Klaus Munro, with French lyrics by Yves Dessca. It represented Luxembourg in the Eurovision Song Contest 1972 held in Edinburgh, winning the contest.

== Background ==
=== Conception ===
"Après toi" was composed by Leandros' father Leandros Papathanasiou, known as Leo Leandros under his pseudonym Mario Panas, and German composer Klaus Munro, with French lyrics by Yves Dessca. It is a dramatic ballad, with the singer telling her lover what will happen to her once he has finally left her for someone else: "After you I will be nothing but the shadow of your shadow".

=== Eurovision ===
Originally, the song was written with German lyrics as "Dann kamst du" and was submitted to the German Eurovision national selection process. When the song did not qualify for that competition, Yves Dessca, who had co-written the lyrics of the 1971 Eurovision winning song "Un banc, un arbre, une rue", penned French lyrics and the Compagnie Luxembourgeoise de Télédiffusion (CLT) internally selected it as its entry for the 17th edition of the Eurovision Song Contest. Dessca remains the only author/composer ever to score back-to-back Eurovision victories.

In addition to the French version, Vicky Leandros recorded the song in English as "Come What May", in Italian "Dopo te", German "Dann kamst du", Spanish "Y después", Greek "Móno esý" Μόνο εσύ, and Japanese "Omoide ni ikiru" 思い出に生きる. This was Leandros' second entry in the Eurovision Song Contest as she had finished fourth in the 1967 contest with "L'amour est bleu".

On 25 March 1972, the Eurovision Song Contest was held at the Usher Hall in Edinburgh hosted by the British Broadcasting Corporation (BBC) and broadcast live throughout the continent. Leandros performed "Après toi" seventeenth on the evening, following Belgium's "À la folie ou pas du tout" by Serge & Christine Ghisoland and preceding the Netherlands' "Als het om de liefde gaat" by Sandra & Andres. Klaus Munro conducted the event's live orchestra in the performance of the Luxembourgian entry.

By the close of voting, the song had received 128 points, placing it first in a field of eighteen, and winning the contest, ahead of the British entry "Beg, Steal or Borrow", performed by The New Seekers. "Après toi" was succeeded as contest winner in 1973 by "Tu te reconnaîtras", sung by Anne-Marie David, also for Luxembourg.

=== Aftermath ===
In the Eurovision fiftieth anniversary competition Congratulations: 50 Years of the Eurovision Song Contest, held on 22 October 2005 in Copenhagen, Anne-Marie David performed the song as part of the interval acts.

== Chart performance ==
=== Weekly charts ===
Chart (1972)	Peak position
Australia (Kent Music Report)	23
Belgium/Flanders (Ultratop)	3
Belgium/Wallonia	1
Dutch (Dutch Top 30)	1
France (SNEP)	1
Germany (Media Control)	11
Ireland (IRMA)	2
Malaysia	3
Norway (VG-lista	2
South Africa (Springbok Radio)	1
Switzerland (Swiss Hitparade)	1
United Kingdom (Official Singles Chart)	2

=== Sales ===
Region	Sales
France	800,000

== Legacy ==
"Après toi" has been afforded a number of translated cover versions including "Jak mám spát" (Czech) recorded by Helena Vondráčková, "Keď si sám" (Slovak) recorded by Eva Kostolányiová, "Rakastan saavuthan" (Finnish) recorded by Carola Standertskjöld, "Posle tebe" (Serbian) recorded by Lola Novaković, "Vắng bóng người yêu" (Vietnamese) recorded by Thanh Lan, "Si te vas" (Spanish) recorded by Paloma San Basilio, "Vad än sker" (Swedish) recorded by Ann-Louise Hanson, "Etter deg" (Norwegian) recorded by Lillian Askeland and Gro Anita Schønn, "Sled teb" ("След теб", Bulgarian), recorded by Lili Ivanova, and "Aşk mı bu" (Turkish), recorded by Ayla Algan in 1973.

The English version "Come What May" was covered by John Gummoe of the Cascades on a 1972 London Recordings single, and by Filipina singer Pilita Corrales on her 1976 album Live At The Riveira With Pilita Amado Vol. 2.

Preceded by "Un banc, un arbre, une rue" by Séverine	Eurovision Song Contest winners 1972	Succeeded by "Tu te reconnaîtras" by Anne-Marie David
