= I giorni dell'arcobaleno =

1972 song by Nicola Di Bari

Single by Nicola Di Bari
- Language: Italian
- Released: 1972
- Composers: Piero Pintucci; Nicola Di Bari
- Lyricist: Dalmazio Masini

Eurovision Song Contest 1972 entry
- Country: Italy
- Artist: Nicola Di Bari
- Language: Italian
- Composers: Piero Pintucci, Nicola Di Bari
- Lyricist: Dalmazio Masini
- Conductor: Gian Franco Reverberi

Finals performance
- Final result: 6th
- Final points: 92

Entry chronology
- ◄ "L'amore è un attimo" (1971)
- "Chi sarà con te" (1973) ►

"I giorni dell'arcobaleno" ("The Days of the Rainbow") is a single by Italian singer Nicola Di Bari. The song was the winner of the Sanremo Music Festival 1972 and later went on to represent Italy at the Eurovision Song Contest 1972 where it placed sixth. It marked the second Sanremo Festival victory in a row for Di Bari, an accomplishment only achieved by three other artists, Nilla Pizzi, Johnny Dorelli and Domenico Modugno.

== Background ==
Described as "minimalist, graceful and lyrical", the song is a nostalgic ballad, with Di Bari singing to a woman about her childhood, which she gave up by taking a lover at a very young age; and while this action, being a passage into adulthood, made her appear "cool" before her more innocent peers and transformed her into a self-assured young woman, she did in fact forsake what was – or could have been – "the best time" of her life. The lyrics of the song underwent several censorship changes, including the raising of the girl's age by three years, and the suppression of a verse referring to previous romantic experiences.

The song was released as a single with the song "Era di primavera" as the B side.

== At Eurovision ==
The song was performed twelfth on the night of the Eurovision Song Contest, following Austria's Milestones with "Falter im Wind" and preceding Yugoslavia's Tereza Kesovija with "Muzika i ti"). At the close of voting, it had received 92 points, placing it 6th in a field of 18.

It was succeeded as Italian representative at the 1973 contest by Massimo Ranieri with "Chi sarà con te".

== Charts ==
Chart (1972)	Peak position
Argentina (CAPIF)	5
Italy (Musica e dischi)	2
Spain (AFYVE)	30
