= Mużika Mużika =

Malta national song festival

Malta Song Festival
- Genre: Pop music, folk music, classical music, etc.
- Location: Malta
- Years active: 1960–present
- Founders: Young Christian Workers

Mużika Mużika (formerly the Malta Song Festival) is the national song festival of Malta.

== Origins and other festivals in Malta ==
The first Malta Song Festival was organized by the Maltese section of the Young Christian Workers movement in 1960. Out of 72 submissions, 20 were chosen for the two semi-finals. Eventually 10 made it for the final of Saturday 5 November 1960. All shows were held at the Radio City Opera House in Hamrun and were transmitted on the island's cable radio system, now extinct, and then better known as Rediffusion. Eight of the ten songs were sung in Italian, one in English and one in Maltese. Each song had to be presented with two different musical arrangements. It was also a requisite to have two different singers for each song.

On 14 November 1960 RAI TV transmitted a video coverage of the festival in its evenings news bulletin.

As far back as 1960 the organizers of the festival were already planning to send the winner to the "Eurovision Song Contest". But the time was not yet ripe for such a dream to materialise. Malta's television company was not yet a member of the European Broadcasting Union, which was a requirement to participate in the contest.

In December 1961 the same Young Christian Workers movement organized also the first "Festival Ta' Kanzunetti Maltin" (Festival of Maltese Songs)". The songs in this festival were all sung in the Maltese language. Although it was organized again in 1962, but after the 1962 edition, a decision was taken that the "Festival Ta' Kanzunetti Maltin" (Festival of Maltese Songs)" would no longer be held.

In 1963 a decision was taken by the Malta Song Festival Board, that it was no longer feasible to organize two separate festivals. Instead it was decided that every song should be presented on stage in two languages, one of which should in Maltese.

In 1964, the Malta Song Festival was transmitted for the first time on the Malta Television Service on 16, 17 and 21 November. The final results were however announced in a presentation ceremony held and transmitted also on Malta Television on Wednesday 25 November 1964

In 1967, Rediffusion Malta, managed to issue the first long playing album of Maltese compositions, entitled "Malta Song Festival 1967". Joe Grima and Victor Aquilina, then Head of Programmes and Assistant Head of Programmes respectively of Rediffusion Malta, were the producers of this first 33 RPM of Maltese songs. In 1967 and 1968 Rediffusion Malta fully financed the festival.

During the same period the late lyricist and composer from Rabat, Malta, John B. Cassar, who was a pharmacist and a teacher by profession, had set up an enterprise called "Tourist Revues International Malta". They were the organizers of "The Malta International Song Festival" which had nothing to do with the "Malta Song Festival". They also used to organize "Festival Della Canzone Italiana A' Malta". The 1966 edition of this festival was held at the Alhambra Theatre in Sliema and was even recorded and transmitted by RAI TV. In the second edition of the "Malta International Song Festival" held at the Hilton Hotel in St' Julians on the 25 July 1969, David Bowie was one of the participants.

On 17 November 1973 "Jove Enterprises" together with Vanni Pule`, Maryanne Xuereb, John Portelli, Joe P. Portelli and others organized the first edition of the "Folk Song Contest" at the Chameleon Suite of the Corinthia Hotel in Attard. The then Malta Government Tourist Board gave its assistance to the organizers of this festival which was also held in 1975 and 1976.

In 1973, the Youth Travel Circle, a youth organization led by Rev. Fr. Maurice Mifsud., organized the first edition of another festival L-Għanja tal-Poplu (People's Ode Song Contest). The songs of this very popular song festival are all sung in the Maltese Language. Against all odds, L-Għanja tal-Poplu (People's Ode Song Contest) has not only managed to survive, but it has even donned a National perspective. Since the nineties, this festival has been regularly transmitted on local television stations.

In 1986, the "Konkors Kanzunetta Festa San Pawl" was the first song festival ever to be held in a church in Malta. The songs all had a religious theme. The festival was held at the Church of St. Paul in Valletta.

Worthwhile pointing out is the fact that the original organizers of the first editions of the Malta Song Festival, namely the Maltese section of the Young Christian Workers are still very much active in the Malta music scene. In fact, on the 9 and 10 October 2015 they organized the 14th. edition of "Strummin', an annual non-competitive music show incorporating a choir a some 63 guitarists, a band and a group of singers.

== 1980s and 1990s ==
In 1981 the organization of the "Malta Song Festival", now known as "Festival Internazzjonali Tal-Kanzunetta Maltija", was taken over by the Ministry of Education and Culture. In the eighties all songs were being sung in the Maltese language and later, a version of the Maltese song was also sung in a foreign language by a foreign artist.

In 1982 the festival was held at Mediterranean Conference Centre between 25 and 28 March 1982. The festival was divided in three categories. Several international singers were invited to take part by singing the festival songs in the language of the foreign participants. Riccardo Fogli and The Tweets, so very well known for their Birdie Song, were the special guests of the 1982 edition.

In 1991, 1992 and 1993 the " Festival Tal-Kanzunetta Maltija" became the venue from which the English version of the winning song would represent Malta in the Eurovision Song Contest.

In 1994 two versions of the festival were held simultaneously, one section for songs in Maltese, and another section for songs sung in English, with the winning song of the latter section representing Malta in the Eurovision Song Contest.

As from 1995 two distinct festivals were organised, one for songs in Maltese and another for songs to represent Malta in the Eurovision Song Contest

Up to 2002, the "Festival Internazzjonali Tal-Kanzunetta Maltija", continued to be organized by the Maltese Government, in tandem with another festival whose winner would represent Malta in the Eurovision Song Contest. But, after 2002, the "Festival Internazzjonali Tal-Kanzunetta Maltija" came to a halt.

On the other hand, the " Malta Song For Europe Festival" continued to be organised year after year. In 2008 the event was renamed Malta EuroSong, but this name was only used for the 2009 and 2010 editions. The event is now known as the Malta Eurovision Song Contest.

== 2010s ==
On 24 July 2013 a meeting was held at the Manoel Theatre in Malta where Josette Grech Hamilton, Chairperson of the newly formed Organizing Committee, announced the return, after an absence of 11 years, of the "Festival Internazzjonali Tal-Kanzunetta Maltija". Mro Sigmund Mifsud was chosen as a conductor of a ten-piece band signifying the return of live performances to this festival. The Maltese Government decided to re-introduce its support and assistance to the festival

Norman Hamilton and Robert Cefai, the current President and Secretary General of the World Association of Festivals and Artists, better known as WAFA, were also present. The organising committee consisted also of Ignatius Farrugia, vice-chairperson; Deo Grech, Media Relations; Ray Falzon, Pierre Cachia and Simone Bugeja. Anton Attard served as the PBS consultant to the board.

On 18 September 2013, the 14 finalists out of 62 submissions were announced on TVM. The festival was held on Saturday 9 November 2013 and transmitted live on TVM. Apart from the 14 local singers who made it to the final, there were also 13 international guest singers who competed amongst themselves, with the group Bella Vista of (Germany) winning this section with their song " Fremd Aber Doch Vertrthe" a German version of the 1999 winning song of this festival "Sa L-Ahhar Nifs".

The joy of its return was however short-lived, because in 2014 the "Festival Internazzjonali Tal-Kanzunetta Maltija" has been sent back to limbo. No official communication has been issued about future editions.

On 26 February 2016 at a press conference held in Spazju Kreattiv in Valletta, Mr. Albert Marshall, Chairman of the Malta Arts Council, announced that "L-Ghanja Tal-Poplu-Festival Tal-Kanzunetta Maltija" will be held in July 2016. The festival, under its new format, will now be organised by the committee of L-Għanja tal-Poplu (People's Ode Song Contest), Malta Arts Council, Spazju Kreattiv, and Public Broadcasting Services. It has also the backing of Valletta 2018 European Capital of Culture and the management of Pjazza Tejatru Rjal where the festival was held on 7 and 9 July 2016.

Results of the 2016 and consecutive editions can be seen on L-Għanja tal-Poplu.

== 2020s ==
This festival, now re-branded as Mużika Mużika, and no longer with any connection to L-Għanja tal-Poplu, was held on 18,19,20 March 2021. Due to COVID-19 restrictions, it was held on TVM. Festivals Malta, together Malta's Public Broadcasting Services were responsible for its organization. The singers in this year's edition, were accompanied by the Malta Philharmonic Orchestra. There were 150 submissions, with 20 making it to the semi-final of 18 March and twelve to the final of 20 March 2021. The edition of Friday 19 March was a non-competitive one where the 20 semi-finalists each sang a Maltese classic song in tandem with a number of Maltese veteran singers. This format is still being adopted.

== Mużika Mużika participants ==
=== 2022 ===
2022 Songs
Song	Singer	Lyricist	Composer
Aħjar Hekk Inkella Agħar	MARA	Emil Calleja Bayliss	Philip Vella
Bla Tarf	Kurt Calleja	Kurt Calleja	Kurt Calleja, Aleandro Spiteri, Peter Borg
Dak Kien Żmien	Mykill ft. Lyndsay and Kalakku	Lyndsay Pace, Matthew Attard and Michael Cini	Micheal Cini
Fittixni	Victoria Sciberras	Lon Kirkop	Gilbert ‘Bibi’ Camilleri
Għal Dejjem	Norbert Bondi	Norbert Bondi	Peter Borg
Ġmielek	Claudia Faniello	Joe Julian Farrugia	Philip Vella
Ħlomt Li	Bernie & Pod and Fiona Cauchi	Ivan Farrugia	Bernard Bonnici and Matteo Depares
Idek F’Idi	Kelly Marie Cassar Hili,	Janice Debattista	Kelly Marie Cassar Hili,
Il-Mużika u Jien	Nicole Frendo	Hilda Curmi	George Curmi
Jien l-Artist	Cherylis	Pamela Bezzina	Pamela Bezzina
Kenn	Cheryl Camilleri	Joseph Axiak	Joseph Axiak
Kewkba Feġġejja	Gaia Cauchi	Stephen Baldacchino	Elton Zarb
Mewġ	Bloodline	Edwin Balzan, Julia Balzan and Samira Cauchi	Glen Vella and Elton Zarb
Mil-Lenti Tiegħi	Joseph Refalo	Pamela Bezzina	Pamela Bezzina
Minn Taħt l-Ilsien	Avenue Sky	Pamela Bezzina	Pamela Bezzina
Ossiġnu	Danica Muscat and Kapitlu Tlettax	Mario Joseph Calleja and Emil Calleja Bayliss	Cyprian Cassar
Purgatorju	Oxygyn	Kurt Abela	Zack Camilleri, Janelle Borg and Luke Camilleri
Tgħidlix Għalfejn	Kyle George	Clifton Casha	Cyprian Cassar
Tkun ‘L Hawn Għaddi	Kantera	Joe Julian Farrugia	Elton Zarb
Wennisni	Franklin Calleja	Emil Calleja Bayliss	Cyprian Cassar

=== 2021 ===
2021 Songs
Song	Singer	Lyricist	Composer
Binti	Ian Vella (Janvil) & Jade Vella	Roberta Magri	Richard Micallef
Fjamma	Fabrizio Faniello	Emil Calleja Bayliss	Philip Vella
Għajejt Inħobb	Christian Arding	Rita Pace	Gilbert 'il-Bibi' Camilleri
Għal Dan il-Lejl	Charisse Vassallo	Emil Calleja Bayliss.	Mark Spiteri Lucas
Għażiż	Danica Muscat.	Emil Calleja Bayliss.	Cyprian Cassar
Ħarsa Biss	Glen Vella	Joe Julian Farrugia	Philip Vella
Ħudni Lura	Bernie & Pod	Ivan Farrugia	Bernard Bonnici
Il-Kitarra u Jien	Philip Vella	Joe Julian Farrugia	Philip Vella
Int Biss	Christina Magrin	Mark Scicluna	Mark Scicluna
Kompli Tbissem	Avenue Sky	Andy Muscat	Glen Vella
L-Ewwel Jien	Kantera	Joe Julian Farrugia	Elton Zarb
Lil Binti	Mark Spiteri Lucas	Mark Spiteri Lucas	Mark Spiteri Lucas
Naħseb Fik	Aidan	Aidan	Aidan
Sinfonija Ħiemda	Miguel Bonello	Joe Julian Farrugia	Aldo Spiteri & Bradley Spiteri
Ta’ Ftit Kliem	Ryan Grech	Ryan Grech	Ryan Grech
Tbissimli	Michela Galea	Emil Calleja Bayliss.	Mark Spiteri Lucas
Teżor	Janice Mangion feat. George Curmi Il-Puse’	Emil Calleja Bayliss.	Cyprian Cassar & Mark Scicluna
Tista’	MJAW	Nikolai Gravino	Nikolai Gravino
Vizzju	Raquel Galdes Briffa	Aiden	Aiden
Warajk	Franklin Callej	Etienne Micallef	Dominic Cini

== Winners ==
The following is a non-comprehensive list of the winners of some of the previous editions of the "Malta Song Festival" and of the "Festival Nazzjonali/Internazzjonali Tal-Kanzunetta Maltija". From the list below, it can be seen that only Enzo Gusman and Renato Micallef came First in this festival five times. Enzo Gusman in 1966, 1974, 1976, 1995, and 2000. Renato Micallef also in 1974, and in 1975, 1985, 1986 and 1989.

=== 2010s & 2020s ===
- 2025 (27-29 March 2025) – Venue: Malta Fairs & Conventions Centre, Ta' Qali
  - 1st place Jamie Cardona : "Stajna Konna Aħna" (written by Jamie Cardona and composed by Aleandro Spiteri Monsigneur)
  - 2nd place Brooke : "Tiegħek Jien" (written by Emil Calleja Bayliss and composed by Cyprian Cassar & Brooke)
  - 3rd place: Pamela Bezzina : "Perfett" (written by Pamela Bezzina and composed by Pamela Bezzina)
  - Best Musical Arrangement : Ryan Paul Abela
  - Best Interpretation : Lisa Gauci
- 2024 (14-16 March 2024) – Venue: Malta Fairs & Conventions Centre, Ta' Qali
  - 1st place Maxine Pace : "Mhux Tal-Aħħar" (written by Emil Calleja Bayliss and composed by Cyprian Cassar)
  - 2nd place Kantera : "Vjaġġ Sabiħ" (written by Joe Julian Farrugia and composed by Kantera & Micimago)
  - 3rd place: Cliff Zammit Stevens : "Fil-Qrib" (written by Joe Julian Farrugia and composed by Philip Vella)
  - Best Musical Arrangement : Aurelio Belli
  - Best Interpretation : Giada
- 2023 (23-25 March 2023) – Venue: Malta Fairs & Conventions Centre, Ta' Qali
  - 1st place Gianluca Bezzina : "Sabiħa" (written by Joe Julian Farrugia and composed by Philip Vella)
  - 2nd place Drakard & Lisa Gauci : "Jekk Mhux Inti" (written by Emil Calleja Bayliss and composed by Cyprian Cassar)
  - 3rd place: Jasmine Abela : "M'Hawnx Bħalek" (written by Philip Vella and composed by Glen Vella)
  - Best Musical Arrangement : Ryan Abela
  - Best Interpretation : Jasmine Abela
- 2022 (21-23 April 2022) – Venue: Malta Fairs & Conventions Centre, Ta' Qali
  - 1st place Kurt Calleja : "Bla Tarf" (written by Kurt Calleja and composed by Kurt Calleja, Aleandro Spiteri Monsigneur and Peter Borg)
  - 2nd place Kantera : "Tkun 'l Hawn Għaddi" (written by Joe Julian Farrugia and composed by Elton Zarb)
  - 3rd place: Claudia Faniello : "Ġmielek" (written by Joe Julian Farrugia and composed by Philip Vella)
  - Best Musical Arrangement : Aurelio Belli
  - Best Interpretation : Avenue Sky
- 2021 (18-20 March 2021) – Venue: Malta Fairs & Conventions Centre, Ta' Qali
  - 1st place Glen Vella : "Ħarsa Biss" (written by Joe Julian Farrugia and composed by Philip Vella)
  - 2nd place Christian Arding : "Għajjejt Inħobb" (written by Rita Pace and composed by Gilbert Bibi' Camilleri)
  - 3rd place: Kantera : "L-Ewwel Jiena" (written by Joe Julian Farrugia and composed by Elton Zarb)
  - 1st in Televoting : Glen Vella : "Ħarsa Biss" (written by Joe Julian Farrugia and composed by Philip Vella)
  - Best Musical Arrangement : Norbert Camilleri :"Sinfonija Ħiemda"
  - Best Interpretation: Christian Arding : "Għajjejt Inħobb"
- 2013 (9 November) – Venue: Mediterranean Conference Centre, Valletta
  - 1st place Olivia Lewis : "Hawn Mill-Ġdid" (written by Joe Julian Farrugia and composed by Paul Abela)
  - 2nd place Mark Tonna : "Poeta Bla Kliem" (written by Emil Calleja Bayliss and composed by Mark Scicluna)
  - 3rd place Dario and Grecia Bezzina : "Solitaire" (written by Rita Pace and composed by Dario Bezzina)
  - 1st in Televoting : Geordie : "Kuraġġ" (written by Joe Chircop and composed by Philip Vella)

=== 2000s ===
- 2002 – Venue: Mediterranean Conference Centre, Valletta
  - 1st place Lawrence Gray : "Eklissi" (written by Godwin Sant and composed by Philip Vella)
  - 2nd place (and 1st in Televoting): Julie & Ludwig : "Adagio" (written by Ray Mahoney and composed by Rene’ Mamo)
  - 3rd place: Olivia Lewis : "Ħolm u Realtà" (written by Fleur Balzan and composed by Paul Giordimaina)
- 2001 – Venue: Mediterranean Conference Centre, Valletta
  - 1st place: Georgina Abela : "Fomm Il-Vjolin" (written by Deo Grech and composed by Andrew Zahra)
  - 2nd place: Ira Losco : "Ingawdu ż-Żgħożija" (written by Ray Agius and composed by Ray Agius)
  - 3rd place: Olivia Lewis & Paul Giordimaina : "Ma Jifred Ħadd" (written by Fleur Balzan and composed by Paul Giordimaina)
- 2000 – Venue: Mediterranean Conference Centre, Valletta
  - 1st place: Enzo Gusman : "Nittama" (written and composed by Philip Vella)
  - 2nd place: Glen Vella & Eleonor Cassar: "Meta Naf Li Inti Tħobbni" (written by Paul Ellul and composed by Chan Vella)
  - 3rd place: Paul Giordimaina : "Kliem" (written by Fleur Balzan and composed by Paul Giordimaina)

=== 1990s ===
- 1999 – Venue: Mediterranean Conference Centre, Valletta
  - 1st place: Fabrizio Faniello : "Sa L-Aħħar Nifs" (written by Alfred C. Sant and composed by Ray Agius)
  - 2nd place: Georgina Abela : "Ħallini Nħobbok" (written by Joe Chircop and composed by Paul Abela)
  - 3rd place: Miriam Christine : "Triq Oħra’" (written by Joe Julian Farrugia and composed by Miriam Christine Borg)
- 1998 – Venue: Gozo
  - 1st place: Lawrence Gray : "Min Jaf Għalfejn" (written by Philip Vella and composed by Ray Agius)
  - 2nd place: Renato Micallef & Adelina Attard : "Għal Xulxin" (written by Sunny Aquilina and composed by Jason Cassar)
  - 3rd place: Debbie Scerri : "Il-Bogħod Mid-Dlam’" (written by Jason Xuereb and composed by Jason Xuereb)
- 1997 – Venue: Gozo
  - 1st place: Catherine Vigar : "Min Jaf Għaliex" (written by Joe Chircop and composed by Paul Abela)
  - 2nd place: Claudette Pace : "Għix Biss Għal-Lum" (written by Ray Agius and composed by Ray Agius)
  - 3rd place: Georgina Abela : "Nersaq Lejk" (written by Georgina Abela and composed by Paul Abela)
- 1996 – Venue: Open Theatre, Ta' Qali
  - 1st place: Alfred Rapa : "Ċensu l-Malti u Katarin" (written by Alfred Rapa and composed by Alfred Rapa)
  - 2nd place: Philip Vella : "Stress" (written by Mario Fenech Caruana and composed by Philip Vella)
  - 3rd place: Renato Micallef : "Djarju" (written by Godwin Sant and composed by Vince Buhagiar)
- 1995 – Venue: Open Theatre, Ta' Qali
  - 1st place: Enzo Gusman John Bundy & Tony Camilleri : "Din Għalikom...Il-Ħbieb Tiegħi" (written by Enzo Gusman and composed by Enzo Gusman)
  - 2nd place: Godwin Lucas : "Il-Gżira Tal-Imħabba" (written by Joe Friggieri and composed by Victor Fenech)
  - 3rd place: Miriam Christine : "Int Tajtni Idek" (written by Julie Brincat and composed by Miriam Christine)
- 1994 – Venue: Mediterranean Conference Centre, Valletta

In 1994 two Festivals were held on the same day. There were four runners-up for each section, and only a First Placing was awarded for each section.

Festival Tal-Kanzunetta Maltija (Festival Of Maltese Songs):

  - 1st place: Doreen Galea & Manolito : "Forsi" (written by Ray Mahoney and composed by Sammy Galea)
  - Runners-up: Renato Micallef: "Kellimni Żżommx Il-Bogħod" (written by & Composed by Thelma Zarb)
  - Enzo Gusman: "M'Għadekx Li Kont" (Written by Carmen Gusman & Composed by Enzo Gusman)
  - Mario Caruana: "Bla Kliem Bla Sliem" (Written by Mario Fenech Caruana & Composed by Mario Caruana)
  - Godwin Lucas: "Jekk Tgħid Le" (Written by Joe Friggieri & Composed by Victor Fenech)

Festival Kanzunetta Għall-Ewropa (Song For Europe):

  - 1st place: Chris & Moira : "More than Love" (written by Moira Stafrace & Composed Chris Scicluna)
  - Runners-up: Phyllisienne Brincat: "Tell Me Why" (written by Frederick Camilleri & Composed by Margaret Camilleri)
  - Renato Micallef: "Shadow Of A Dream" (Written & Composed by Laurence Spiteri)
  - Georgina Abela: "Remember The Beginning" (Written & Composed by Philip Vella)
  - Ray Caruana: "Scarlet Song" ( Written by Ray Mahoney & Composed by Dominic Galea)

Live Orchestra directed by Mro. George Debono. Comperes: John Bundy & Lucienne Selvagi.

- 1993 – Venue: Mediterranean Conference Centre Valletta
  - 1st place: William Mangion & Choir : This Time / Issa" (written by William Mangion & Jesmond Tedesco and composed by William Mangion)
  - 2nd place: Marita, Jon Lukas & Friends : "Love We Share/ Għannaqni" (written and composed by Lukas Agius))
  - 3rd place: Alexander Schembri : "F'Mument / Woman" (written by Doris Chetcuti and composed by Georgina Abela)
  - Best Interpretation : Renato Micallef

Live Orchestra directed by Mro. Joseph Sammut. Comperes: John Demanuele & Maria Bugeja.

- 1992 – Venue: Mediterranean Conference Centre Valletta
  - 1st place: Mary Spiteri : "Little Child / Tfajjel Ckejken" (written by Ray Mahoney & Composed Georgina Abela. Arranged by Paul Abela)
  - 2nd place: Moira Stafrace : "Tgħidlix / Don't Throw Our Love Away" (written by Joe Friggieri and composed by Benedict Galea))
  - 3rd place: Mike Spiteri : "Paceville / Lonely People" (written by Alfred C. Sant and composed by Ray Agius)
  - Best Maltese Version: Mike Spiteri : "Paceville / Lonely People" (written by Alfred C. Sant and composed by Ray Agius)
  - Best Interpretation : Helen Micallef
  - Best Personality : Moira Stafrace

Live Orchestra directed by Mro. George Debono. Comperes: Charles Saliba & Anna Bonanno.

- 1991 –
  - 1st place: Georgina Abela & Paul Giordimaina : "Could It Be / Sejjaħ u Ssibni" (written by Ray Mahoney & Composed by Paul Abela)

=== 1980s ===
- 1989
  - 1st place: Renato Micallef & Marisa Vella: "Aħfirli" (written by Alfred C. Sant and composed by Ray Agius)
  - 2nd place : Spectrum : "Ħamiema Bajda" (written by Ino M. Busuttil and composed by Mario Caruana)
  - 3rd place: Adelina Attard "Il-Mużika" (written and composed by Jose'Micallef)
- 1986 – Venue : Tignè Sliema
  - 1st place Category A : Renato Micallef : "Il-Karnival Ta’ Malta" (written by and composed by Lino Cauchi)
  - 1st place Category B: Joe George : "Il-Kuġin Ġiljan" (written and composed by Alfred C. Sant)
  - 1st place Category C: Phylisienne Brincat : "U Int Jekk Bħali" (written and composed by Frederick Camilleri)
- 1985
  - 1st place Category A : Renato Micallef & Marisa : "Separju" (written by Alfred C. Sant and composed by Ray Agius)
  - 1st place Category B: Paul Giordimaina : "Għanja Lill-Omm" (written and composed by Lino Cauchi)
  - 1st place Category C: Mike Spiteri & Mirage : "Kompjuter" (written by Alfred C. Sant and composed by Ray Agius)
- 1984 (22–24 March)
  - 1st place Category A : Joe Cutajar : "Messaġġ Ta’ Sliem" (written by Cynthia Sammut and composed by Paul Abela)
  - 1st place Category B: Renato Micallef : "Kenn Is-Sliem" (written and composed by Alfred L. Tanti)
  - 1st place Category C: Mary Spiteri "Li Kieku " (written and composed by Sylvia Sammut)
  - Special prize for the song chosen by the Public: Tony Camilleri "L-Għannej" ( written and composed by Alfred C. Sant)
- 1983 (24–26 March)
  - 1st place Category A : Ralph Dougall : "Lilek Biss" (written and composed by A. Busuttil)
  - 1st place Category B: Paul Giordimaina : "Għalxejn" (written and composed by L. Cauchi)
  - 1st place Category C: George Agius : "Ħabib Tinsiex" (written and composed by Doreen Galea)
- 1982 (25–28 March)
  - Category A (Composers & Authors under 30 years)
  - 1st place: Mary Rose Mallia : "Jekk Trid Il-Hena" (written by Francis Falzon and composed by Ray Cremona)
  - 2nd place: Mary Spiteri : "Jekk Trid" (written by Doreen Galea and composed by Sammy Galea)
  - 3rd place: Bayzo: "Mużika Mużika" (written by Alfred C. Sant and composed by Paul Abela)
- 1981
  - 1st place: The Tramps: "Sinjur Ġib il-Paċi" (written by John Ellis and composed by Dominic Grech)
  - 2nd place: Tony Camilleri & Frank O'Neil : "L-Ittra" (written and composed by Frank O’Neill)
  - 3rd place: Marisa Vella: "Telegramm" (written and composed by Alfred C. Sant)

=== 1970s ===
- 1976
  - 1st place: Enzo Gusman : "Tifkiriet Tagħna T-Tnejn" / "Sing Your Song Country Boy" (written by Alfred C. Sant and composed by Ray Agius)
- 1975 (5 February) – Venue: Malta Television Studios
  - 1st place: Renato Micallef : "Singing This Song" (written by M. Iris Mifsud and composed by Sammy Galea)
    - The following were the 5 semi-finalists of the 1975 edition :
      - "Live For Tomorrow" (Rokna Minn Qalbi) sung by Mary Spiteri (written by Mary Sant and composed by Paul Abela)
      - "A New World" (Dinja Ġdida) sung by Renato Micallef ( written and composed by Joe Ellul)
      - "Try A Little Love Today" (Id F'Id) sung by Mary Spiteri ( written by Mary Morey and composed by Victor Fenech)
      - "Singing This Song" (Idħaq u Ċċajta) sung by Renato Micallef (written by M. Iris Mifsud and composed by Sammy Galea)
      - "Sing A Song Of Love" (L-Għanja Tal-Imħabba) sung by The Greenfields ( written by and composed by Charles Bajada)

This semi-final was held at the Alhambra Cinema in Sliema on Saturday 1 February 1975. The 21-piece orchestra was under the direction of the late Mro Twanny Chircop and Mro Paul Arnaud. Norman Hamilton and Mary Grech were the comperes.

(Renato Micallef represented Malta in the Eurovision Song Contest with this song. It was Malta's third participation in the Eurovision Song Contest and the first time that the song was sung in the English Language.)

- 1974
  - 1st place: Enzo Gusman & Renato Micallef: "Paċi Fid-Dinja" / "Peace to the World" (written and composed by Enzo Gusman)

(Enzo sang the Maltese version whilst Renato sang the English version.)

- 1972
  - 1st place: Carmen Vella & Mary Rose Mallia : "L-Imħabba" (written Albert M. Cassola and composed by Charles Camilleri)

(L-Imħabba represented Malta in the 1972 Eurovision Song Contest. It was not sung by the winners but by Joe Cutajar & Helen Micallef)

- 1971 (29 January) – Venue: Studios of Malta Television
  - 1st place: Joe Grech & The Links : "Marija l-Maltija" (written Charles Mifsud and composed by Joe Grech)

(Joe Grech represented Malta for the first time in the 1971 Eurovision Song Contest with this song.) (Enzo Gusman with his song "Dlonk Dlonk" obtained the highest number of votes from televoting.)

=== 1960s ===
- 1969 (10 August) (The 10th Edition) – Venue: Buskett Roadhouse, Rabat, Malta
  - 1st place: Carmen Schembri & Carmelo Borg : "Una Stella Fra Mille" / "Nista' Nib....Mitt Baħar" (written by Victor Zammit and composed by Clement Zammit)
  - 2nd place: The Links & Helen Micallef: "L'Arcobaleno" / "Il-Qawsalla"" (written by V. M. Pellegrini and composed by F. X. Pisani)
  - 3rd place: The Links & Carmen Schembri: "Le Stagioni" / "L-Istaġuni" (written by Albert M. Cassola and composed by L. A. Scolaro)
  - Best Singer Trophy: Joe Cutajar
  - Comperes: Joan Azzopardi & Charles Abela Mizzi
  - Music conducted by Mro. Joseph Vella and Mro. Paul Arnaud.
  - In 1969 Rediffusion Malta Ltd. were not part of the organizing committee of the festival.
- 1968 (7 December) (The 9th Edition) -Venue; Plaza Theatre, Sliema
  - 1st place: Helen Micallef & Mary Rose Mallia : "Ora Tu Capirai" / "Dalwaqt Tkun Taf" (written by Albert M. Cassola and composed by Carmelo Zammit)
  - 2nd place: Edwin Galea & Joe Bugeja: "Forever More" / "Ma Tintesiex" (written by Ronald V. Abdilla and composed by Georgette Ciappara)
  - 3rd place: Enzo Gusman & The Links: "The Parata" / "Il-Parata Żinn Żinn Żinn" (written by Edwin Vella and composed by F. X. Pisani)
  - Best Singer Trophy: Carmelo Borg
  - Special Guest Singer : Malcolm Roberts
  - Comperes: Mary Grech & Norman Hamilton.
  - Music conducted by Mro. Joseph Sammut.
- 1967 (9 December) (The 8th Edition) Venue: Radio City Opera House Hamrun
  - 1st place: Joe Grech & Mary Rose Darmanin : "Serenata" / "Serenata" (written by George Zammit and composed by Joseph Ciappara)
  - 2nd place: Marie Therese Vassallo & Doris Curmi: "Bit-Tlikki Tlikki" / "E va va vanno"" (written by Marie Therese Vassallo and composed by Frank Vassallo)
  - 3rd place: Mary Rose Mallia & Tessie Micallef: "Ix-Xorti u L-Imħabba" / "Ogni Volta" (written by George Zammit and composed by Carmelina Zammit)
  - Best Singer Trophy: Tessie Micallef
  - In 1967 the first Long Playing Album of the 12 finalists was published. Special guests present at the festival were Roger Moore, Jean Kent, Oreste Kirkop and Joseph Calleia.
- 1966 (25,26 & 27 November)(The 7th. Edition) – Venue: Malta Television Studios
  - 1st place: Enzo Gusman & Tessie Micallef: "Tu" / "Int" (written Albert M. Cassola and composed by Carmelo Zammit)
  - 2nd place: Tessie Micallef & Mary Rose Darmanin: "It-Talba" / "La Preghiera" (written by Albert M. Cassola and composed by Carmelo Zammit)
  - 3rd place: Carmen Schembri & Carmelo Borg: "Ma Ninsa Qatt" / "Tu Piangerai" (written by Clemente Zammit and composed by Victor Zammit)
  - Best Singer Trophy: Not awarded because "M.T.V. management refused to provide the panel of judges with a television set. The judges maintained that to vote for the best singer's interpretation they had to be seen and heard."
- 1965 (25 November) (The 6th. Edition) – Venue: Malta Television Studios
  - 1st place: Tessie Micallef : "Più Non Vorrei" (written by Albert M. Cassola and composed by Carmelo Zammit)
  - 2nd place: The Links & Josephine Debono : "Pebbles on the Beach" (written by and composed by F. X. Pisani)
  - 3rd.place: Joseph Vella : "Confesso" (written by and composed by Joseph Vella)
- 1964 (16,17 & 21 November) (The 5th. Edition) – Venue: Malta Television Studios
  - 1st place: Joseph Vella & Carmen Schembri : "Io Che Ti Voglio Così / "Il-Ħlewwa ta' Dawk Għajnejk" (written by and composed by Joseph Vella)
  - 2nd place: Four Links : "Sei Troppo Bella" (written by and composed by F. X. Pisani)
  - 3rd.place: Joseph Vella & Carmen Schembri : "Amor Sei Tu / Lejl u Nhar" (written by and composed by Joseph Vella)
  - Best Singer Trophy : Carmen Schembri
- 1963 (12,14 & 24 October) (The 4th. Edition) – Venue: Catholic Institute, Floriana
  - 1st place: Agatha Vassallo & Joe Gatt : "Ci Sposeremo a Maggio" / "L-Għanja Ta' Mħabbitna" (written by Clemente Zammit and composed by Jimmy Pullicino)
  - 2nd place: Clemente Zammit & Camilleri Bros. : "Prima La Canzone" / "Bgħatt Għasfur Jgħidlek" (written by and composed by Clemente Zammit)
  - 3rd.place: Agatha Vassallo & Frans Fenech : "Ticche Tacche" / "Tluppi Tluppi" (written by and composed by G. Fiorini)
- 1962 (17,18 & 19 May) (The 3rd. Edition) – Venue: Radio City Opera House, Hamrun
  - 1st place: [Emily Cauchi, Reggie Spiteri & A.E.I.O.U.] : "Poi" (written by Clemente Zammit and composed by Alphonse Vella)
  - 2nd place: The Satellites & Joe Grech : "Rebbieħa" (written by and composed by J. B. Cassar)
  - 2nd.place: Joseph Vella & Emily Cauchi & Four Stars : "Come Se Mai" (written by and composed by Joseph Vella)

("Rebbieħa", sung in Maltese, & "Come Se Mai" both came in the second place)

- 1962 (15 December) (The 2nd. Festival of Maltese Songs) – Venue: Radio City Opera House, Hamrun
  - 1st place: Joe Grech & Carmen Schembri : "Żgħażagħ Rebbieħa" (written by and composed by Ivo Galea)
  - 2nd place: Franz Frendo & Grace Said : "Ġmiel Qaddis" (written by and composed by Saver Pisani)
  - 3rd place: Paul Tanti & Censina Zammit : "Il-Qamar Tal-Maħbubin" (written by and composed by Carmelo zammit)

(Even in 1962 two separate festivals were organized. One for foreign language songs and another one for songs sung in Maltese)

- 1961 (8,9 & 10 June) (The 2nd. Edition) – Venue: Radio City Opera House, Hamrun
  - 1st place: Emily Cauchi & Reggie Spiteri & AEIOU Choir : "Poi" (written by Clemente Zammit and composed by Alphonse Vella)
  - 2nd place: Four Links & Emily Cauchi : "Non Piangere Cosi'" (written by and composed by J. B. Cassar)
  - 3rd place: Joseph Vella & Emily Cauchi : "Tutto Di Te" (written by and composed by Joseph Vella)
- 1961 (14,15 & 16 December) (The 1st Festival of Maltese Songs) – Venue: Radio City Opera House, Hamrun
  - 1st place: Four Links & Terry L. Bencini : "Madonnina Omm Ġesù" (written by and composed by J. B. Cassar)
  - 2nd place: Frans Fenech & Reggie Spiteri : "Xemx Jew Qamar" (written by and composed by Mro. Jos. Ciappara)
  - 3rd place: AEIOU Choir & Carmen Schembri & Grace Said : "Sparaw Għall-Qamar" (written by and composed by Mro. Jos. Ciappara)

(In 1961 two separate festivals were organized. One for songs sung in a foreign language and another one for songs sung in Maltese)

- 1960 (5 November) (The 1st. Edition) – Venue: Radio City Opera House, Hamrun
  - 1st place: Joe Grech : "Vola Uccellino" (written by and composed by Joe Grech)
  - 2nd place: Terry L. Bencini & Francis Frendo : "Primavera in Fior" (written by and composed by Inez Lombardo)
  - 3rd place: Terry L. Bencini & Iris Vella Urso : "Polpo" (written by and composed by Paul Portelli & Gemma Portelli)
  - Best Singer Trophy: Terry L. Bencini
  - Note: The only song in Maltese in this first edition was "L-Għada Tal-Festa" written and composed Joseph Ciappara. It did not place with the finalists.

== See also ==
- Malta in the Eurovision Song Contest
