= List of post-nominal letters (Malta) =

Post-nominal letters of Malta include:

Office	Post-nominal
National Order of Merit
Companion of Honour (Kumpann ta' Unur tal-Ordni ta' Malta) (Note: There is an additional higher Grade Companion of Honour With Collar, but the post-nominal letters are the same)	KUOM
Companion (Kumpann tal-Ordni ta' Malta)	KOM
Officer (Uffiċjal tal-Ordni ta' Malta)	UOM
Member (Membru tal-Ordni ta' Malta)	MOM
Xirka Ġieħ ir-Repubblika
Sieħeb il-Ġieħ	SG
Honours
Midalja għall-Qlubija (Medal of Bravery)	MRQ
Midalja għall-Qadi tar-Repubblika (Medal of Service to the Republic)	MQR

Higher Education
Qualification	Post-nominal
Spacial Planning (Masters degree)	M. Spat. Planning
Notarial Studies (Masters degree)	M.Not.St.
Family Studies (Masters degree)	M. Family St.
Medicine and Surgery (Doctor)	M.D.

Institutional Abbreviations
Institution	Post-nominal
University of Malta	(Melit.)
Institute for Education	(IfE)
Malta College of Arts, Science and Technology	(MCAST)

Memberships and Fellowships
Institution	Post-nominal
College of Remote and Offshore Medicine (Member)	MCoROM
Malta Institute of Accountants (Member/Fellow)	MIA/FIA
Malta College of Family Doctors (Member)	MMCFD

== See also ==
- Lists of post-nominal letters
