= Terry L. Bencini =

Maltese actor and singer (1930–2024)

- Born: August 18, 1930; Sliema
- Died: October 27, 2024 (aged 94); Sliema
- Citizenship: Malta
- Occupation: actor singer

Terry L. Bencini M.Q.R. (August 18, 1930 – October 27, 2024) was a Maltese actress and singer.

Bencini was the youngest of 14 children. Her father was Ġianni Bencini. She started her career at age 17 with a theater company run by Johnny Navarro and Charles Izzo. Later Bencini joined Nosì Ghrilando’s Ribalta company.

In 1948 Bencini became a regular cast member of Radio Muskettieri, a comedy radio program, on Rediffusion, alongside Charles Clews, Armando Urso, Johnnie Catania and Ġemma Portelli. She worked on the program for 14 years.

Bencini performed on stage, primarily in comedies and operettas, with Żeża tal-Flagship being one of the most popular and also her favorite. Bencini was well regarded as a versatile singer and in 1960 she won best singer in the first Malta Song Contest.

In 1993 Bencini retired from public life. in 2007 she was awarded the Medal for Service to the Republic.

In 2022, she moved to a nursing home in Sliema following the death of her husband, Maurice Lubrano, a former ambassador and key organizer in the Malta Summit.

Bencini and Lubrano had three children, Massimo, Andreina and Vanya, nine grandchildren and four great-grandchildren.
