= Kantilena =

Kantilena may refer to:

- Il-Kantilena, the oldest known literary text in the Maltese language
- Kantilena (band), a Maltese contemporary folk band active between 2009 and 2016
