= YTC =

YTC may refer to:

- Yeshiva Toras Chaim
- Yakima Training Center
- Yunnan Tin Group (Holding) Company Limited
- Yellowhead Tribal Council, whose education program YTC Education became Yellowhead Tribal College
- Youth Travel Circle, Malta
- Yield to call, a variant of yield to maturity
- Your Tribal Chief, a nickname of professional wrestler Roman Reigns
