= Orders, decorations, and medals of Malta =

The current honours system of the Republic of Malta has its foundation in the 17 October 1975 Ġieh ir-Repubblika Act. This act has been subsequently amended by Acts XXXVII of 1976, XIII of 1983, XIV of 1990, XI of 1991 and XV of 1993; Legal Notice 423 of 2007; and Acts VI of 2008, V and XVII of 2011, and XIX of 2013. This act lays out the structure of the orders and medals of Malta. Subsidiary legislation spells out details missing in the initial act and also established national commemorative medals. The honours system of Malta can be broken down into three general parts, the National Order of Merit, Xirka Ġieħ ir-Repubblika, and Medals of the Republic.

== Order of wear ==
The following is the order of wear for the orders and medals of Malta:

1. Companion of Honour of the National Order of Merit
2. Xirka Ġieħ ir-Repubblika
3. Companion of the National Order of Merit
4. Officer of the National Order of Merit
5. Member of the National Order of Merit
6. Midalja għall-Qlubija (Medal for bravery)
7. Midalja għall-Qadi tar-Repubblika (Medal for Services to the Republic)
8. National Commemorative Medals
  1. Malta George Cross Fiftieth Anniversary Medal (1992)
  2. Malta Self-Government Re-introduction Seventy-Fifth Anniversary Medal (1996)
  3. Malta Independence Fiftieth Anniversary Medal (2014)
9. Distinguished Service Medals
  1. Armed Forces of Malta Distinguished Service Medal
  2. Malta Police Force Distinguished Service Medal
  3. Malta Prison Service Distinguished Service Medal
10. Long and Efficient Service Medals.
  1. Armed Forces of Malta Long and Efficient Service Medal
  2. Malta Police Force Long and Efficient Service Medal
  3. Malta Prison Service Long and Efficient Service Medal
