= Joe Grech =

Maltese singer (1934–2024)

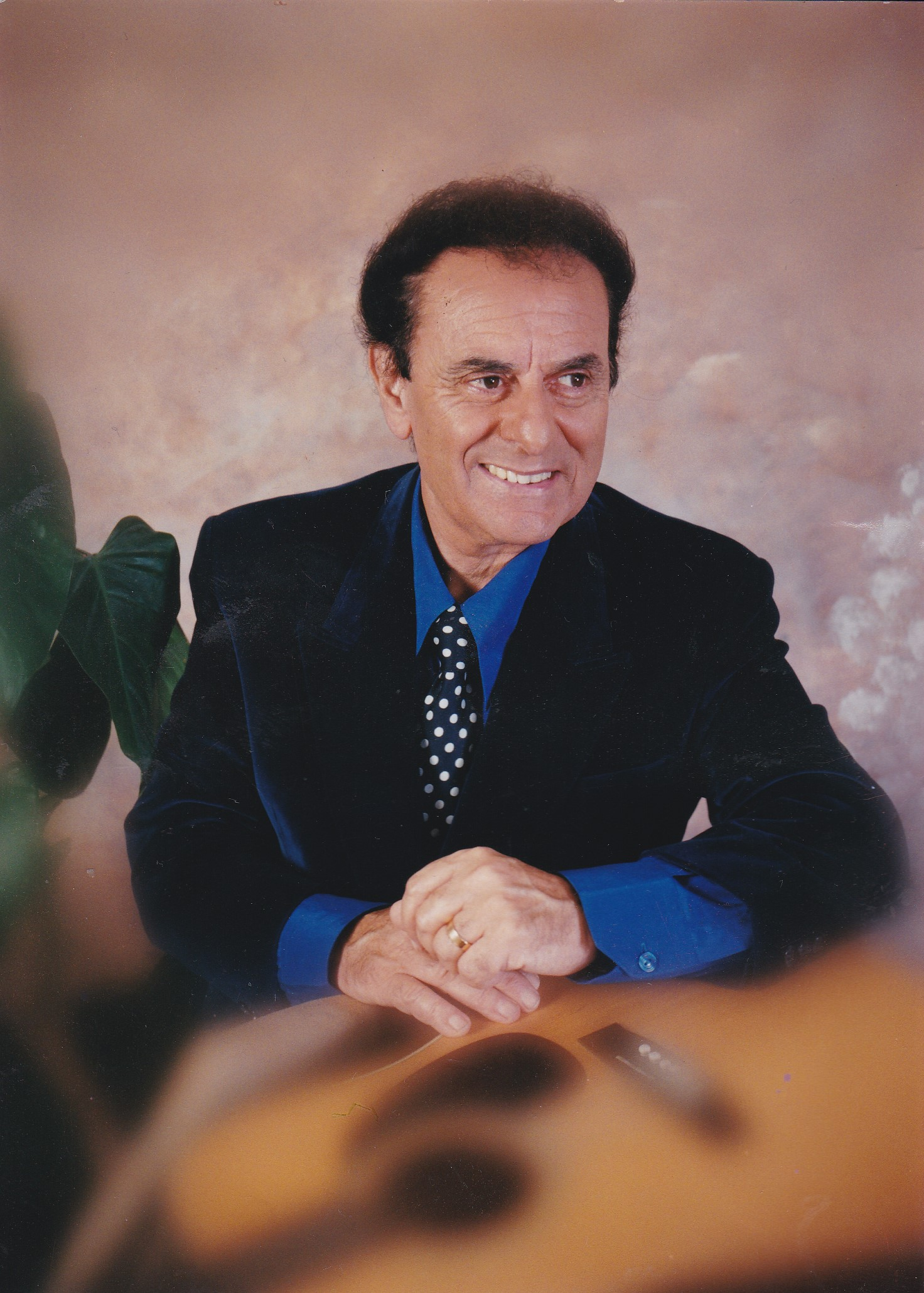
Joe Grech in 2005

Joseph Grech, MQR (9 February 1934 – 30 December 2024) was a Maltese singer. He is best known for having introduced the Maltese language to the Eurovision Song Contest 1971, the first appearance from Malta on this pan-European television event.

== Early years ==
Grech was born in Cospicua, Malta on 9 February 1934. At a very early stage in his life, Grech started to play the trumpet with the Żejtun Band Club. However, he soon switched to singing.

He was the first singer to win the first Malta Song Festival in 1960, a festival which was organized by the Żgħażagħ Ħaddiema Nsara, the local section of the Young Christian Workers. The festival was held at the Radio City Opera House in Ħamrun, Malta. Ten songs were presented in the semi-final of 3 November and another ten songs on the semi-final of 4 November. Out of these twenty songs, ten made it to the final night of 5 November 1960. The winning song was Grech's own composition "Vola Uccellino".

The festival was also transmitted on Rediffusion Malta, then a cable radio service provider in Malta since September 1935. Victor Aquilina and Marlene Lauri were the comperes of this festival. Two orchestras conducted by Prof. Giorlando Valente and Mro. Dominic Vella respectively, accompanied the ten songs. Eight of these songs were sung in Italian, one in English and one in Maltese, the latter being "L-Għada tal-Festa Ma' Vitorin". This song was sung by Frans Fenech and Terry L. Bencini. Incidentally Terry was also awarded the Best Singer Trophy of this festival.

Again in 1962, Grech was classified as the winner of the Malta Song Festival with the song "Żgħażagħ Rebbieħa" written and composed by Ivo Galea B.A. Hons L.P. This was also interpreted by Carmen Schembri, later Gusman. Carmelo Abela was responsible for the orchestration.

In 1965, the "Impresa Valente" chose Grech to represent Malta in the Italian Festival of Martina Franca. Another Maltese singer, Tony Agius, also participated in this festival. In those days, it was very rare for a Maltese singer to participate in an Italian festival, let alone win a trophy as the Best Foreign Singer of this Italian festival. The then Italian High Commissioner of Italy for Malta, Antonio Spada, presented a trophy to Joe Grech.

In 1967, Joe managed to establish himself as one of Malta's most popular pop singers. His 45 rpm entitled " Il-Kaċċatur", The Hunter, published on Maltadisk APL 1005 B, and recorded by Audiovision Productions, with their studios then located in Zachary Street, Valletta, and now at Mile End in Hamrun, started selling like pastizzi in Malta. It also made a tremendous success in countries where the Maltese had a diaspora, especially Australia. "Il-Kaċċatur" was composed by Mro. Joseph Ciappara with lyrics by Dr. George Zammit. Incidentally "Il-Kaċċatur" was designated as the "B" side of the record, with Carmen Schembri singing "L-Għanja tal-Emigranti", The Emigrants' Song, being the "A" side. This success prompted Audiovision Productions to issue another follow-up record for Joe still as a "B" side entitled "Il-Festa Tagħna", (Our Feast). This was another composition by Mro. Joseph Ciappara with lyrics by J.B.Cassar.(Maltadisk APL 1006). Joe's first "A" side was entitled "Ku Klu Ku Klu" (Cock-a doodle-doo) with lyrics by Albert M. Cassola and music by F.X. Pisani.(Maltadisk APL 1007). In 1968, two other "A" sides were published: "Il-Lejl Tal-Vitorja" (Victory Night) (Maltadisk APL 1015) and "Nhar San Girgor" (St. Gregory's Day) (Maltadisk APL 1016). The lyrics of these two songs were written by Dr. George Zammit whilst Mro. Guzeppi Ciappara composed the music. In those days, in Malta, it was a landmark for a Maltese singer to record four consecutive 45 rpm in less than two years. These records continued to increase the popularity of Grech both in Malta and in the Maltese diaspora. In these four recordings, Grech was always accompanied by the orchestra of Mro. Spiro Zammit.

Again in 1967, Rediffusion Malta, published the first 33 RPM long playing album of Maltese compositions, entitled "Malta Song Festival 1967". Joe Grech, together with Mary Rose Darmanin, won this festival with the song "Serenata". Roger Moore was the guest of honour in the 8th Malta Song Festival, which was also held at the Radio City Opera House in Hamrun on Saturday 8 December 1967. In this same festival, Grech also sang "O Carina Madalena". The song was composed by Arthur Desira. It is included as the 2nd track on Side 1 of this album. Joe Grima and Victor Aquilina, then Head of Programmes and Assistant Head of Programmes respectively of Rediffusion Malta, were the producers of this first 33 rpm of Maltese songs.

== The 1970s ==
On 3 April 1971, Grech was the first Maltese singer to represent Malta in the Eurovision Song Contest with "Marija l-Maltija". Since it was sung in Maltese, this rendered it the first Eurovision song which was sung in a Semitic language. The song was composed by Grech himself, and the lyrics were written by Charles Mifsud. The orchestra of the Eurovision Song Contest was conducted by Mro. Twanny Chircop, the brother of another Maltese tenor and film star Oreste Kirkop of The Vagabond King. Incidentally it was Oreste Kirkop who presented the winning trophy to Joe Grech on the night of that first 1960 Malta Song Festival. The song "Marija l-Maltija" was translated into Swedish and was included in the repertoire of the Swedish singer Lasse Berghagen.

In the 1970s, Grech successfully toured the London, Scottish and Irish circuits. He also had many successful tours in Canada, America, Italy and Australia. It was during one of these tours that Grech, under the management of Joe Stafrace, recorded a Long Playing Album "Saħħa Malta With Joe Grech". The orchestra on this LP was composed mostly of members of the Sydney Opera House orchestra, under the direction of Joe Paparone. The song "Evviva l-Maltin" was composed by Grech himself, specifically for his Australian tour and was dedicated to the several thousands of Maltese living down under. In 1976, Grech performed at the Royal Ballroom of Melbourne, and on 12 March 1977, he gave a spectacular show at the Sydney Opera House. Also in 1977, W&G Records published an extended play featuring Grech's daughter Marcelle accompanied by a narration from the voice of the legendary Maltese broadcaster Charles Abela Mizzi, together with another single sung by Joe and Marcelle.

Incidentally the record "Saħħa Malta" was first issued in the early 1970s as the "B" side to "Is-Sajjied". The single was published by "Anthony D'Amato" of Valletta. Grech was accompanied on this record by his own group, made up of Edward Briffa on the Accordion, John Guffrey and Tony Pace on the guitars and a certain George on the drums. The recording was made at the studios of Malta Television. Later on, these two songs were also included on a Long Playing Album compilation issued also by Anthony D'Amato, entitled Souvenir of Malta Vol 1 (ADLS 8001).

Tracks of the Long Playing Album "Saħħa Malta with Joe Grech":

Side 1

- Welcome To Malta
- In-Nassab
- Marija l-Maltija
- Surriento
- Godfather
- Għada Tkun Tiegħi

Side 2

- Evviva L-Maltin
- Another Time Another Place
- Xalata Bil-Karrozzin
- Is-Sajjied
- Viva La Spagna
- Saħħa Malta

Musical arrangements: Joe Paparone. Distributed by : M & G Record Co, Melbourne.

== Later life ==
In 2000, Grech published a CD entitled "Katarin, Joe Grech, Marcelle & Philip." Arranged and produced by Joe Brown, the CD contains 15 tracks all sung in Maltese.

Joe Grech's generosity and charitable character were brought to the attention of the Order of Malta. In 2002, the Order awarded him the Cross of Merit.

On 13 December 2019, Grech was awarded the prestigious award "Midalja għall-Qadi tar-Repubblika" (Medal for Service to the Republic) by the President of Malta.

== Personal life and death ==
Grech was the brother of religious philanthropist and veteran broadcaster Mons Victor Grech, one of the founders of Caritas Malta.

Grech married Josephine (née' Buttigieg) on 24 September 1961. They had a daughter Marcelle, also a versatile singer.

Grech died on 30 December 2024, at the age of 90.

== Sources ==
- Live Recording of Eurovision 1971 "Marija l-Maltija" on YouTube

Awards and achievements
| Preceded by None (first time entry) | Malta in the Eurovision Song Contest; 1971 | Succeeded by Helen and Joseph with "L-imħabba" |
