= Malta in the Eurovision Song Contest 1971 =

- Eurovision Song Contest 1971
- Participating broadcaster: Maltese Broadcasting Authority (MBA)
- Country: Malta
- Selection process: Song for Europe 1971
- Selection date: 20 January 1971

Competing entry
- Song: "Marija l-Maltija"
- Artist: Joe Grech
- Songwriters: Joe Grech; Charles Mifsud

Placement
- Final result: 18th (last), 52 points

Participation chronology

Malta was represented at the Eurovision Song Contest 1971 with the song "Marija l-Maltija", composed by Joe Grech, with lyrics by Charles Mifsud, and performed by Grech himself. The Maltese participating broadcaster, the Maltese Broadcasting Authority (MBA), selected its entry through a national final. This was the first-ever entry from Malta in the Eurovision Song Contest, and the first-ever entry performed in Maltese in the contest.

== Before Eurovision ==
=== National selection ===
Song for Europe was the national final format developed by the Maltese Broadcasting Authority (MBA) which determined the song that would represent Malta at the Eurovision Song Contest 1971. The competition consisted of two parts. The first part was the Malta Song Festival 1970, where the top 6 songs would then go on to the Song For Europe contest. The two contests were organised by two separate organisations; the Malta Song Festival was organised by the Malta Song Festival Board, while Song For Europe was organised by MBA. The use of Malta Song Festival as part of the Maltese national final was a cooperation between the two organisations, this led to the broadcaster not actually being in control of the songs in its own national final.

==== Competing entries ====
The Malta Song Festival Board received 60 submissions, from which 12 were chosen to compete in the Malta Song Festival.

Song	Songwriter(s)
"Dlonk, dlonk"	Sammy Galea, Albert M. Cassola
"Ejja fil-qrib"	Doreen Galea
"Fi ħdanek"	Victor Zammit, Clemente Zammit
"Ħabbejt kitarra"	Inez Lombardo, Clemente Zammit
"Ħolma' ta' ftit żmien"	C. Fiott, M.F. Tonna, P. Mallia, A. Mamo
"Int u jien"	T. Frendo, G. Zammit
"Irrid nghix miegħek biss"	Edwin Galea
"Il-festa tal-poplu tad-dinja"	Edward Briffa
"L-għanja li ktibt għalik"	Carmelo Zammit
"Marija l-Maltija"	Joe Grech, Charles Mifsud
"Min int?"	Victor Fenech, Clemente Zammit
"Wara x-xejn"	Lee Spiteri, Edw. Cassar-Scicluna

==== Malta Song Festival 1970 ====
Malta Song Festival 1970 was held on 28 November 1970 at the Malta Hilton. All songs were sung twice, and the top six qualified to Song For Europe 1971. The order in which the songs were performed is unknown.

Artist	Song	Result
Carmen Schembri	"Dlonk, dlonk"	Qualified
Enzo Gusman	"Dlonk, dlonk"	Qualified
Carmen Xerry	"Ejja fil-qrib"	Qualified
Doreen Galea	"Ejja fil-qrib"	Qualified
Carmelo Borg	"Fi ħdanek"	—N/a
Carmen Schembri	"Fi ħdanek"	—N/a
Monica Cremona	"Ħabbejt kitarra"	—N/a
Unknown	"Ħabbejt kitarra"	—N/a
Alfred Agius	"Ħolma' ta' ftit żmien"	—N/a
Merga	"Ħolma' ta' ftit żmien"	—N/a
Carmelo Borg	"Int u jien"	—N/a
Mary Rose Darmanin	"Int u jien"	—N/a
Edwin Galea	"Irrid nghix miegħek biss"	Qualified
Unknown	"Irrid nghix miegħek biss"	Qualified
Alfred Agius	"Il-festa tal-poplu tad-dinja"	Qualified
Joe Cutajar	"Il-festa tal-poplu tad-dinja"	Qualified
Mary Rose Mallia	"L-għanja li ktibt għalik"	—N/a
Mary Spiteri	"L-għanja li ktibt għalik"	—N/a
Joe Grech	"Marija l-Maltija"	Qualified
The Links	"Marija l-Maltija"	Qualified
Joe Cutajar	"Min int?"	Qualified
Mary Spiteri	"Min int?"	Qualified
Franz Frendo	"Wara x-xejn"	—N/a
Merga	"Wara x-xejn"	—N/a

==== Song for Europe / Kanzunetta Għall-Ewropa 1971 ====
Song for Europe 1971 (Maltese title: Kanzunetta Għall-Ewropa 1971) was held on 20 January 1971 at the Malta Television Studios, hosted by Victor Aquilina, Mary Grech, Charles Micallef, and Yvonne Zammit. The voting was done by an internal and external jury. The internal jury consisted of ten people affiliated with the music industry who each gave out 21 points (6 to their favourite, 5 to their 2nd, 4 to their 3rd, 3 to their 4th, 2 to their 5th, and 1 to their last), all the internal jury votes were multiplied by 10 after they were given out. The external jury consisted of 10 groups of 10 members of the public, representing the 10 electoral districts of Malta, and were chosen at random. Each of the jurors gave out 21 points in the same way the internal jury did.

A clause in the rules of the national final stated that the selection was only to select the song that would represent Malta and not the artist, however, Joe Grech was selected as the singer of "Marija l-Maltija" for the Eurovision Song Contest anyway.

R/O	Artist	Song	Internal Jury	External Jury	Total	Place
1	Joe Cutajar	"Il-festa tal-poplu tad-dinja"	400	309	709	4
2	Carmen Schembri	"Ejja fil-qrib"	300	240	540	6
3	Mary Spiteri	"Min int?"	390	343	733	3
4	Enzo Gusman	"Dlonk, dlonk"	350	399	749	2
5	Edwin Galea	"Irrid nghix miegħek biss"	310	387	697	5
6	Joe Grech	"Marija l-Maltija"	350	422	772	1

== At Eurovision ==
On the night of the final Joe Grech performed second in the running order, following Austria and preceding the eventual winner Monaco. At the close of voting "Marija l-Maltija" had received 52 points, getting Malta a last place on their debut.

The Maltese conductor at the contest was Anthony Chircop.

Each participating broadcaster appointed two jury members, one below the age of 25 and the other above, who voted by giving between one and five points to each song, except that representing their own country. All jury members were colocated at the venue in Dublin, and were brought on stage during the voting sequence to present their points. The Maltese jury members were Gaetan Abela and Spiro Sillato.

=== Voting ===
Points awarded to Malta
Score	Country
10 points	
9 points	
8 points	
7 points	
6 points	
5 points	Spain; Netherlands
4 points	Ireland; Austria; Belgium; Italy
3 points	United Kingdom; Finland; Germany; France
2 points	Portugal; Norway; Yugoslavia; Monaco; Switzerland; Luxembourg; Sweden

Points awarded by Malta
Score	Country
10 points	
9 points	
8 points	Spain; United Kingdom
7 points	Luxembourg
6 points	Ireland; Italy
5 points	Germany; Switzerland; Monaco
4 points	Sweden; Finland
3 points	Portugal; Norway; Austria
2 points	Yugoslavia; France; Netherlands; Belgium
