= L-Għanja tal-Poplu =

Maltese song competition

- Genre: Pop, Folk, Classical, etc.
- Location: Malta
- Years active: 1973–present
- Founders: Youth Travel Circle
- Website: https://www.ghanjatalpoplu.org

L-Għanja tal-Poplu (People's Ode Song Contest) is an annual Maltese festival celebrating original songs composed in the Maltese language.

== History ==
First organized by Youth Travel Circle (YTC) on 5 May 1973 at the St. Albert College in Valletta, the song has evolved into a prominent platform that promotes Maltese culture, language, and music by offering local composers, lyricists, and performers the opportunity to present their work to a wide audience.

L-Għanja tal-Poplu was founded as a means to foster the creation and appreciation of original Maltese songs. From its inception, the festival was envisioned as a celebration of the Maltese language and culture, providing a space for both emerging and established artists to share their musical expressions. Over the decades, the event has maintained its commitment to artistic quality and originality while adapting to changing musical landscapes.

Founded by Rev. Maurice Mifsud. Initially the contest had to register as YTC members. From 1987 onward, the contest took a national dimension. The competing songs are sung primarily in Maltese and are written either by the singers themselves or other songwriters. In the 1990s the contest started being transmitted on local television stations.

=== Trophy ===
The main trophy, in rosewood, citrus wood, brass and acrylic was designed by Donald Friggieri in 1987. It is awarded to the singer of the winning song, held for one year and then passed on to the singer of the winning entry the following year.

=== Venue ===
At present the competition is being organised in mid-summer in Pjazza Teatru Rjal with all the songs being accompanied by the Malta Concert Orchestra. Previously, it had been held in Sala Temi Zammit at the University of Malta.

== Format and Objectives ==
The festival serves as a contest and cultural event where participants are invited to submit original compositions. Key objectives include:

- Promoting the creation of high-quality Maltese songs.
- Providing a platform for composers, lyricists, and performers to reach a growing audience.
- Fostering community engagement and cultural exchange through music.

Each edition of L-Għanja tal-Poplu features regulated submission periods, public performances, and a final show that showcases selected finalists. The festival has no restrictions on theme or style as long as the songs are original and performed in Maltese.

== Organization ==
This contest is today organised by the voluntary organisation L-Għanja tal-Poplu and also supported by Arts Council Malta.

Key figures include:

- Dun Maurice Mifsud – Founder and long-time organizer, whose continuous involvement since the inaugural edition has been instrumental in shaping the festival’s direction.
- Carmelo Schembri - Chairperson of L-Għanja tal-Poplu and leading the organisation since 1990.
- Alexia Cutajar Conti – Serving as secretary since 2002, she has played a central role in maintaining communications between the organizing committee and the participants.
- Dr. Ingrid Vella – A committee member who contributes to the festival’s innovation and renewal, bridging artistic pursuits with academic insight.
- Other members include Noel Damato (Production Manager), Anton Miceli (Assistant Administrator), Mark Grech (Committee Member).
- Non-Committee Members : Prof Manwel Mifsud, and Tony Micallef (Media Coordinator and Archivist).

== Impact and Legacy ==
L-Għanja tal-Poplu has played a significant role in the Maltese cultural landscape by:

- Enhancing the visibility of Maltese language music.
- Supporting the careers of local artists.
- Serving as a community-building event that celebrates Maltese identity.
- Encouraging innovation while preserving traditional elements in songwriting and performance.

The festival’s long-running success is often attributed to its inclusive approach, allowing for diverse musical expressions while adhering to quality and originality requirements.

== Winners ==
=== 2026 ===
Held at Pjazza Teatru Rjal, 1 August 2026

- 1st place: Cherylis: " Mara" (written and composed by Corazon)
- 2nd place: Lon Kirkop and Mark Cahia: "Requiem Stradalis" (written and composed by Lon Kirkop and Mark Cahia )
- 3rd place: Mark Tonna and Leontine: "Ħallejna" (written by Rita Pace and composed by Andrew Zahra)
- Best Singer/Songwriter: Lon Chircop and Mark Cahia for the song "Requiem Stradalis"
- Best Social Theme: Lon Chircop and Mark Cahia for the song "Requiem Stradalis"
- Enzo Gusman award for best interpretation: Cherylis for the song "Mara"
- Broadcaster's Award: Mark Tonna and Leontine for the song "Ħallejna" (written by Rita Pace and composed by Andrew Zahra)

=== 2025 ===
Held at Pjazza Teatru Rjal, 2 August 2025

- 1st place: Rita Pace : " Narakom L-Infern" (written by Rita Pace and composed by Augusto Cardinali)
- 2nd place: Mark Tonna : "Moħħi Mistieħ" (written by Mark Tonna and composed by Andrew Zahra)
- 3rd place: Mark Spiteri Lucas and Mark Micallef Costa: "Skuri u Ċari" (written and composed by Mark Spiteri Lucas and Mark Micallef Costa)
- Best Singer/Songwriter: Daryl James for the song "Aħfirli"
- Best Social Theme: Peppi Azzopardi for the song "Għad Għandi Erba' Snin"
- Enzo Gusman award for best interpretation: Cherylis for the song "Inħobbok Wisq"
- Broadcaster's Award: Kayley Cuschieri for the song "Ersaq 'l Hawn"
- Special guest singer, author and composer Joe Demicoli, was awarded " L-Għanja Li Tibqa’ " for his outstanding contribution to the Maltese Music Scene throughout his long career.

=== 2024 ===
Held at Pjazza Teatru Rjal, 3 August 2024

- 1st place: Laura Bruno : " Għażiża " (written by Mark Spiteri Lucas and composed by Mark Spiteri Lucas)
- 2nd place: Florence Aquilina : "Namra" (written by Florence Aquilina and composed by Florence Aquilina
- 3rd place: Dario Bezzina : "Fissidni" (written by Dario Bezzina and composed by Dario Bezzina)
- Best Singer/Songwriter: Florence Aquilina for the song "Namra"
- Best Social Theme: Lon Kirkop for the song "Straight"
- Enzo Gusman award for best interpretation: Laura Bruno for the song " Għażiża "
- Special guest singer Renato Micallef, was awarded " L-Għanja Li Tibqa’ " for his outstanding contribution to the Maltese Music Scene throughout his long career.

=== 2023 ===
Held at Pjazza Teatru Rjal, 5 August 2023

- 1st place: Christian Arding : " Il-Baħħ u Jien " (written by Natasha Grima and composed by Natasha Grima and Charlene Grech)
- 2nd place: Mark Spiteri Lucas and Debbie Scerri : "Meravilja" (written by Emil Calleja Bayliss and composed by Mark Spiteri Lucas
- 3rd place: Laura Bruno : "Katina" (written by Paul Ellul and composed by Mark Spiteri Lucas)
- Best Singer/Songwriter: Jean Claude Vancell for the song "Monokrom"
- Best Social Theme: Lon Kirkop for the song "Għadu Ma Sarx"
- Enzo Gusman award for best interpretation: Christian Arding for the song " Il-Baħħ u Jien "
- Spacial guest singer Merga (Merga Galea) was awarded " L-Għanja Li Tibqa’ " for her outstanding contribution to the Maltese Music Scene throughout her long career.

=== 2022 ===
Held at Pjazza Teatru Rjal, 30 July 2022

- 1st place: Alexia Micallef : "Fil-Kexxun" (written by Lon Kirkop and composed by Lon Kirkop)
- 2nd place: Marija Bellia : "Ismi" (written by Iona Dalli and Maria Bellia and composed by Iona Dalli and Maria Bellia)
- 3rd place: MARA : "Ħelu Manna" (written by Emil Calleja Bayliss and composed by Philip Vella)
- Best Singer/Songwriter: Maria Bellia for the song "Ismi"
- Best Social Theme: Joe Julian Farrugia for the song "Mr X"
- Special guest singer, author and composer Tony Camilleri was awarded "L-Għanja Li Tibqa’" for his outstanding contribution to the Maltese Music Scene throughout his long career.

=== 2021 ===
Held at Pjazza Teatru Rjal, 7 August 2021 -

- 1st place: Sean Borg : "Fuq L-Ixkaffa" (written by Philippa Naudi and composed by Bettina Muchmore)
- 2nd place: Haley Azzopardi : "Is-Sirena Li Welldet it-Tama" (written by Paul Ellul and composed by Mark Spiteri Lucas)
- 3rd place: MeadowStrings : "Niftakar" (written by Mario Camilleri and composed by Magdalene Farrugia)
- Best Singer/Songwriter: MeadowStrings : "Niftakar" (written by Mario Camilleri and composed by Magdalene Farrugia)
- Best Social Theme: Mark Laurence Zammit : "Se Nirranġaw" sung by Dominic Cini and Anna Azzopardi (written by Mark Laurence Zammit and composed by Mark Laurence Zammit)
- Best Interpretation Award: Dario & Grecia Bezzina : "Il-Bajtar Sar" (written by Rita Pace and composed by Dario Bezzina)
- Special guest singer, author and composer Enzo Gusman awarded " L-Għanja Li Tibqa’ " for his outstanding contribution to the Maltese Music Scene throughout his long career.

=== 2020 ===
Held at Pjazza Teatru Rjal, 11 September 2020 -

- 1st place: Marilyn Aquilina : "Jiena u Int" (written by Marilyn Aquilina and composed by Mariliyn Aquilina)
- 2nd place: Rita Pace : "Sant'Antnin" (written by Rita Pace and composed by Rita Pace)
- 3rd place: Sarah Micallef Muscat : "Sakemm Sibt Garaxx" (written by Frederick Camilleri and composed by Augusto Cardinali)
- Best Singer/Songwriter: Jean Claude Vancell : "F'Dirghajk" (written by and composed by Jean Claude Vancell)
- Best Interpretation Award: Kemmuna Airways : "Ħass u Basal" (written by Rita Pace and composed by Rita Pace)
- Best Social Theme: JAMM Band : "Normalita' Ġdida" sung by JAMM Band (written by Mark Cachia and composed by Mark Cachia)

=== 2019 ===
Held at Pjazza Teatru Rjal, 31 August 2019

- 1st place: Philip Vella : "Il-Verita'" (written by Philip Vella and composed by Philip Vella)
- 2nd place: Cherylis : "Tfewwaħ" (written by Cherylis Camilleri & Emil Calleja Bayliss and composed by Cherylis Camilleri & Philip Vella)
- 3rd place: Rachel Lowell : "Minn Kajfas Għal Għand Pilatu" (written by Rachel Lowell & Emil Calleja Bayliss and composed by Rachel Lowell & Philip Vella)
- Best Original Song: Rachel Lowell : "Minn Kajfas Għal Għand Pilatu" (written by Rachel Lowell & Emil Calleja Bayliss and composed by Rachel Lowell & Philip Vella)
- Best Singer/Songwriter: Cherylis : "Tfewwaħ" (written by Cherylis Camilleri & Emil Calleja Bayliss and composed by Cherylis Camilleri & Philip Vella)
- Best Interpretation Award: Janice Mangion : "Għadu Mhux Il-Waqt" (written by Emil Calleja Bayliss and composed by Mark Scicluna)

=== 2018 ===
Held at Pjazza Teatru Rjal, 1 September 2018

- 1st place: Michela Galea : "Mhux Kulma Jleqq Deheb" (written by Emil Calleja Bayliss and composed by Renato Briffa)
- 2nd place: Dwett (Cherylis & Mikhail) : "Mhux Kif Ħsibt" (written by Giovann Attard and composed by Pamela Bezzina & Alex Debono)
- 3rd place: Philip Vella : "Allura" (written by Joe Chircop and composed by Philip Vella)
- Best Original Song: Charlene Mercieca Magro : "Nistenniek" (written and composed by Corazón Mizzi)
- Best Singer/Songwriter: JAMM Band : "Hadd Ma Jaf Xi Jrid" (written by and composed by JAMM Band)
- Best Recording: Philip Vella : "Allura" (written by Joe Chircop and composed by Philip Vella)
- Best Interpretation Award: Monica Said : "Anamika" (written by Monica Said and composed by Conrad Dimech & Michael Camilleri)

=== 2017 ===
Held at Pjazza Teatru Rjal, 2 September 2017

- 1st place: Jessica Magro : "Meta r-Ramel Jitħallat mas-Silġ" (written by Paul Ellul and composed by Pamela Bezzina)
- 2nd place: Dario & Grecia Bezzina : "13, Strada Stretta" (written by Emil Calleja Bayliss and composed by Dario Bezzina)
- 3rd place: Xarulu' : "Rutina Tgħallina" (written and composed by Xarulu')
- Best Original Song: Odelsie Camilleri - "Narak Kuntent" (written and composed by Odelsie Camilleri)
- Best Singer/Songwriter: Ryan Grech "Min Jaf" (written by and composed by Ryan Grech)
- Best Recording: Xarulu' : "Rutina Tgħallina" (written and composed by Xarulu')
- Best Interpretation Award: Monica Said : "Ritratt" (written and composed by Philip Vella)

=== 2016 ===
Held at Pjazza Teatru Rjal, 9 July 2016

- 1st place: Corazon : "X'Se Jsir" (written by and composed by Corazon Mizzi)
- 2nd place: Neville Refalo : "Ta' Bil-Lejl" (written by Paul Ellul and composed by Mark Spiteri Lucas)
- 3rd place: Mikela Bajada : "Mellisni" (written by Joe Chircop and composed by Mark Spiteri Lucas)
- Best New Young Talent: Jurgen Xerri - "Ħallejt Il-Passi Wrajk" (written by Paul Ellul and composed by Glenn Vella)
- Best Singer/Songwriter: Corazon for "X'Se Jsir" (written by and composed by Corazon Mizzi)
- Best Social Theme: Neville Refalo : "Ta' Bil-Lejl" (written by Paul Ellul and composed by Mark Spiteri Lucas)
- Best Interpretation Award: Nadine Fenech : "Il-Biża' u Jien" (written by Rita Pace and composed by Pamela Bezzina)
- Special guests: Kantilena

=== 2015 ===
Held at Pjazza Teatru Rjal, 21 March 2015 -

- 1st place Ecca Muscat : "Ġismi" (written by Mark Pellicano and composed by Matthew Pellicano)
- 2nd place: Raquel (Galdes) : "Ċans Ieħor" (written by Daniel Paul Farrugia and composed by Norbert Borg)
- 3rd place: Rita Pace : "Battibekk" (written by Emil Calleja Bayliss & Paul Attard and composed by Rita Pace)
- Best New Young Talent: Abstract Acoustic Duo - "Niftakarna" (written and composed by Gabriel Cassar)
- Best Singer/Songwriter: Mark Cachia : "Waqt Li Qed Nitfi D-Dawl" (written and composed by Mark Cachia)
- Best Social Theme: Mark Pellicano : "Ġismi" sung by Ecca Muscat (written by Mark Pellicano and composed by Matthew Pellicano)
- Best Interpretation Award: Rita Pace for "Battibekk" (written by Emil Calleja Bayliss & Paul Attard and composed by Rita Pace)

=== 2014 ===
Held at Sala Temi Zammit, University of Malta, Tal-Qroqq, 15 March 2014 -

- 1st place: Karen DeBattista : "Jien Ma Naħdimx" (written by Rita Pace and composed by Mark Scicluna)
- 2nd place: Frank O'Neill, Christabelle Curmi & Il-Lajks : "Kif Xrobbtuli L-Menti" (written and composed by Frank O'Neill)
- 3rd place: Miriam Christine & Olivia Lewis : "Wara L-Kanċell" (written by Joe Julian Farrugia and composed by Miriam Christine)
- Best New Young Talent: Denise Spiteri - "Pupa" (written and composed by Mark Laurence Zammit)
- Best Singer/Songwriter: Frank O'Neill for "Kif Xrobbtuli L-Menti" (written and composed by Frank O'Neill)
- Best Social Theme: Rita Pace : "Il-Quċċata" sung by 7 Spadi" (written by Rita Pace and composed by Jeffrey Scicluna)
- Best Interpretation Award: Christian Arding : "Il-Karba Tal-Mument" (written by Kevin Tanti and composed by Chan Vella)

=== 2013 ===
Held at Sala Temi Zammit, University of Malta, Tal-Qroqq, 20 April 2013

- 1st place Cherise Attard : "Hawn Siġġu Nieqes" (written by Paul Ellul and composed by Mark Spiteri Lucas)
- 2nd place: Dorothy Muscat : "Signor Si" (written by Joe Julian Farrugia and composed by Sammy Galea)
- 3rd place: Rita Pace : "Pupazz" (written by Emil Calleja Bayliss and composed by Rita Pace)
- Best New Talent: Fiona Camilleri - "Taħnina" (written and composed by Robert Carbonaro)
- Best Singer/Songwriter: Sylvan Borg for "Il-Maltin Bil-Politika Mehdijin" sung by Justin Galea u Banda Briganti written by Keith Muscat and composed by Sylvan Borg
- Best Social Theme: Estelle Fenech Imbroll : "Virtwali" (written by Paul Attard and composed by Mark Scicluna)
- Best Interpretation Award: X-Tend : "Kuluri Lwien" (written and composed by Charles Dalli)

=== 2012 ===
Held at Sala Temi Zammit, University of Malta, Tal-Qroqq, 21 April 2012

- 1st place KulTural : "Malta Tiegħi" (written and composed by KulTural)
- 2nd place: Grecia Bezzina : "Tal-Komma Twila" (written by Emil Calleja Bayliss and composed by Dario Bezzina)
- 3rd place: Kantilena : "Baħħar" (written by Drinu Camilleri and composed by Drinu Camilleri and Kantilena)
- Best New Talent: Mistura - "Isma' Bilfors" (written and composed by Antonio Olivari)
- Best Singer/Songwriter: Drinu Camilleri for "Baħħar" (written by Drinu Camilleri and composed by Drinu Camilleri and Kantilena)
- Best Social Theme: Rita Pace : "Kwadru jew Tond" (written and composed by Rita Pace)
- Best Interpretation Award: Maria Debono : "Mhux Illum" (written by Rita Pace and composed by Mark Laurence Zammit)
- Special guests: Brikkuni

=== Previous Editions ===
- 2011 - The festival was not held.
- 2010 - Corazon u l-Ħbieb tal-Qalb : "Mill-Għajnejn ta' Tifla" (written and composed by Corazon Mizzi)
- 2009 - Corazon and Walter Micallef : "Tal-Aħħar" (written and composed by Corazon Mizzi)
- 2008 - Brikkuni : "L-Uffiċċju" (written and composed by Brikkuni)
- 2007 - Corazon : "Hawn Jien" (written and composed by Corazon Mizzi)
- 2006 - J. Anvil : "Kyrie Eleison" (written by Giovann Attard and composed by Augusto Cardinali)
- 2005 - Julie Pomorski : "Żewġ Qagħqiet" (written and composed by Augusto Cardinali)
- 2004 - Ina Robinich : "Wellidni" (written by Deo Grech and composed by Dominic Cini)
- 2003 - Julie Zahra & Ludwig Galea : "Sebgħat Ilwien" (written by Anabel Spiteri and composed by Felicienne Fenech Caruana)
- 2002 - Philip Vella : "Fil-Każ, Grazzi" (written by Joe M. Farrugia and composed by Philip Vella)
- 2001 - Frans Baldacchino (Budaj) and Priscilla Psaila : "Tisimgħu Tissaħħar" (written by Frans Baldacchino and composed by Priscilla Psaila)
- 2000 - Glen Vella and Eleanor Cassar : "It-Tfal ta' Llum" (written by Paul Ellul and composed by Chan Vella)
- 1999 - Triccas : "Il-Karrakka" (written by Mario F. Caruana and composed by Renato Briffa)
- 1998 - Philip Vella : "Kemm Jien Beżżul" (written by Joe M. Farrugia and composed by Philip Vella)
- 1997 - Enzo Gusman : "It-Tijatru" (written and composed by Enzo Gusman)
- 1996 - Mark Tonna : "Allerġija għall-Bnedmin" (written and composed by Rene Mamo)
- 1995 - John Bundy : "Pajjiż tal-Miki Maws" (written and composed by Martin Attard)
- 1994 - Walter Micallef : "In-Nofsinhar" (written and composed by Walter Micallef)
- 1993 - Fr. Paul Buhagiar : "Il-Ħolma tal-Għaqda" (written and composed by Fr. Paul Buhagiar)
- 1992 - Walter Micallef : "Iż-Żmien" (written and composed by Walter Micallef)
- 1991 - The festival was not held.
- 1990 - Mary Buttigeg sive Galea k/a Merga : "Inti" (written and composed by Manwel Mifsud)
- 1989 - The festival was not held.
- 1988 - The festival was not held.
- 1987 - The Greenfields : "Aħna l-Maltin" (written and composed by Joe Tanti)
- 1986 - Mario Debono : "Il-Pappa" (written and composed by Mario Debono)
- 1985 - Julie Brincat : "Niftakar fil-Bieraħ" (written and composed by Julie Brincat)
- 1984 - Manwel Mifsud : "Carmelina" (written and composed by Manwel Mifsud)
- 1983 - Manwel Mifsud : "April" (written and composed by Manwel Mifsud)
- 1982 - "Sqallija" (written and composed by Joe Morana)
- 1981 - "Mineral Astratt" (written and composed by Manwel Scicluna)
- 1980 - Mario Debono : "Noli" (written and composed by Mario Debono)
- 1979 - Walter Micallef : "Ġuvni" (written and composed by Walter Micallef)
- 1978 - "Il-Gid Taz-Zmien" (written and composed by George Cassola)
- 1977 - Charles Ellul : "Ħondoq Ir-Rummien" (written and composed by George Cassola)
- 1976 - Manwel Mifsud : "Jgħid il-Bidwi" (written and composed by Manwel Mifsud)
- 1975 - Manwel Mifsud : "Għanja lil-Liberta'" (written by Manwel Mifsud and composed by Phyllis Mifsud)
- 1974 - Manwel Mifsud : "Ir-Raħal Tiegħi" (written and composed by Manwel Mifsud)
- 1973 - Charles Azzopardi : "Il-Warda" (written and composed by Charles Casha)
