= Enzo Gusman =

Maltese singer (1947–2021)

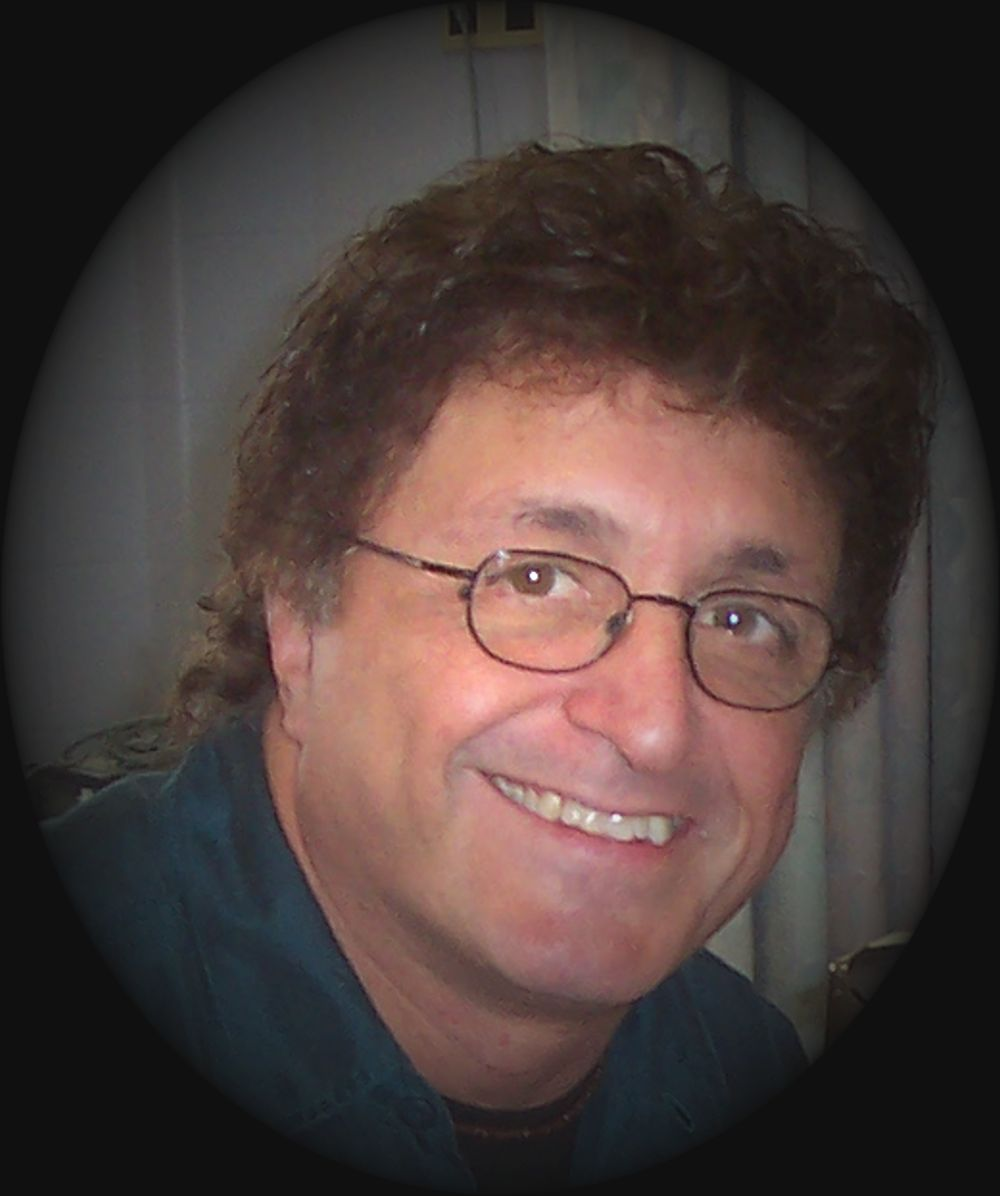
- Gusman in 2006
- Born: Laurence Enzo Gusman; 9 August 1947; Sliema, Crown Colony of Malta
- Died: 18 December 2021 (aged 74)
- Spouse: Carmen Schembri
- Children: 2

Laurence Enzo Gusman (9 August 1947 – 18 December 2021) was a Maltese folk singer. It was Malta's late comic actor Johnnie Navarro who discovered him and invited him as a resident singer on a programme called "TIC TAC" transmitted on the now-defunct Malta's Cable Radio system run by Rediffusion. In 1964, Gusman was the vocalist of the Maltese pop-group "The Boys". In 1965, Gusman pursued a career in banking, even when he emigrated to Canada in 1979. In later years, he would again spend several years living in Malta.

== Career ==
Gusman was born in Sliema, Crown Colony of Malta.

As a singer, Gusman participated in several international song festivals, such as World Popular Song Festival, Tokyo, Japan; Festival Internacional De la Canción, Viña del Mar, Chile; Olympiad De La Chanson, Athens, Greece; Alexandria International Song Festival, Alexandria, Egypt; Castlebar International Song Festival, Castlebar, Ireland; Cavan International Song Festival Cavan, Ireland; Istanbul International Song Festival, Istanbul, Turkey; Festival Menschen und meer Rostock, East Germany; and Festival Golden Orpheus, Slantchev Bryag, Bulgaria. His major achievement was when he won the coveted ‘First Prize’ at the Golden Orpheus Festival in Bulgaria. In Ireland, he was awarded the Best Foreign Artist at The Cavan International Song Festival, and in Turkey he was declared as the Best Interpreter in the Istanbul International Song Festival.

Gusman wrote and composed several of his own songs, many of which are still very popular in Malta and in the Maltese diaspora. Gusman won the Malta Song Festival five times. In Malta he was also a well known radio and television personality.

== Personal life ==
Gusman was married to Carmen Schembri, a well-known singer in the Maltese light music scene and they had two daughters, Johanna and Greta.

On 13 December 2011 President George Abela awarded Enzo the Midalja ghall-Qadi tar-Repubblika (Service to the Republic) in recognition for his sterling work as a singer, composer and broadcaster.

In August 2020, Enzo's family members denied rumours that he had died, albeit they declared that he was in intensive care, following a fall.

On 7 August 2021, during the festival L-Għanja tal-Poplu, Gusman was awarded a special recognition for his great contribution to the Maltese music scene. During the festival, which was televised on TVM, Gusman delivered a short video-message from his recovery bed in Canada.

=== Death ===
He died in his home in Canada on 18 December 2021, at the age of 74. His funeral was held ten days later on 28 December.

On 15 March 2023 a monument for Enzo was inaugurated in St. Mary Street in Sliema where Enzo was born and raised.
