= Antonio Olivari =

- Born: Antonio Olivari; 28 September 1980 (age 45)
- Origin: Ħamrun, Malta
- Genres: Rock; Acoustic; Soundtrack music, Maltese
- Occupations: Songwriter; Composer; Guitarist
- Instrument: Guitar
- Years active: 2000 – present
- Label: Independent

Antonio Olivari was born on 28 September 1980. He is a songwriter and composer from Ħamrun, Malta and has written songs in English and in Maltese. He is the co-founder of Malta-based band Mistura.

== Music career ==
Antonio Olivari issued his first two albums with instrumental compositions between 2000 and 2001 through MP3.com. These were called "Islanded in One's World" (2000) and "Anima" (2001). These albums are not available anymore, but according to researcher and promoter of Maltese music Toni Sant, "Olivari was one of a handful of Maltese musicians who published their work through MP3.com back when the site was a non-commercial hotbed of unsigned acts".

In 2009, Antonio released an online album called 'Dark Ages' through Pinkpube.com Reviews of the album included comments such as "the songs, which mainly feature an acoustic guitar accompanied by ethereal guitar effects in the background, sound otherworldly and dark; a very good dream pop album. Tracks of note include The End of Time and The Clown Song". In 2017 he released a song in Maltese called 'Id-Dinja li Naf jien'.

Antonio is a co-founding member of Mistura, which is a blues-progressive rock band in Malta he formed with Malcolm Bonnici. Mistura issued their first album, called 'U d-Dinja Tkompli Ddur' in 2014, issued 'Regħbus' in 2018 and 'MMXX' in 2020. Mistura sings entirely in Maltese.

Antonio also composed the soundtrack for a variety of TV programmes and series, from the music to the opening sequence of television programme X-Lab in 2009, which was broadcast on TVM (Malta) and on the Cyprus Broadcasting Corporation, the soundtrack for the second season of the Maltese local television series 'Għeruq' in 2010, which was produced by Hermann Bonaci Productions and broadcast on NET Television (Malta) at prime-time, and on the closing song for the television series 'Il-Prinċep tal-Warda Bajda', produced by Foxy Nixy and broadcast every Friday afternoon on ONE TV. Furthermore, Antonio composed an original soundtrack for a TV Series called 'Il-Misteru tan-Nannu Ton', which was broadcast on Maltese National Broadcaster TVM (Television Malta) twice a week in 2011.

From time to time, he was involved in a variety of projects, soundtracks and bands, from a collaboration with Żgħażagħ Ħaddiema Nsara and Symphonik Choir for their annual concert Strummin' Home entitled 'Keep on Strummin' and other songs such as 'The Language of Music', as part of the Akustika project with Strummin' Foundation , and has performed multiple times at the Għanafest annual Mediterranean folk music festival organised by the Malta Council for Culture and the Arts,

== L-Għanja tal-Poplu ==
Antonio has participated in the L-Għanja tal-Poplu festival in 2008, 2009, 2010 and in the 2012 edition. In 2008, he qualified with the songs 'Isbaħ Jum', sung by Justin Galea, and 'Se Ngħaddi 'l Hawn', co-written with and sung by Corazon Mizzi. In 2009, he qualified again with the song 'Attent' and placed third. 'Attent' was sung by Justin Galea. In 2010, he again participated with two songs: one entitled 'Bażar' sung by Justin Galea and another with Tale Kwali called 'Sur Wara Sur'. In 2012, Antonio participated with yet another two songs. The first, as part of Tale Kwali, was called 'Blokk Appartamenti' while the second song, with his then new band Mistura, was called 'Isma' Bilfors'. The latter won the prize for Best New Talent.

== Partial song list ==
- "Se Ngħaddi 'l Hawn": released on L-Għanja tal-Poplu 2008 compilation CD, lyrics - Corazon Mizzi, music - Antonio Olivari. Sung by Corazon.
- "Attent": released on L-Għanja tal-Poplu 2009 compilation CD, lyrics and music - Antonio Olivari. Sung by Justin Galea and placed third during the festival
- "Isma' Bilfors": released on L-Għanja tal-Poplu 2012 compilation CD, lyrics and music - Antonio Olivari. Sung by Mistura and winner of the WAFA Best New Talent during the festival
