= Charles Clews =

Maltese writer and comedian (1919–2009)

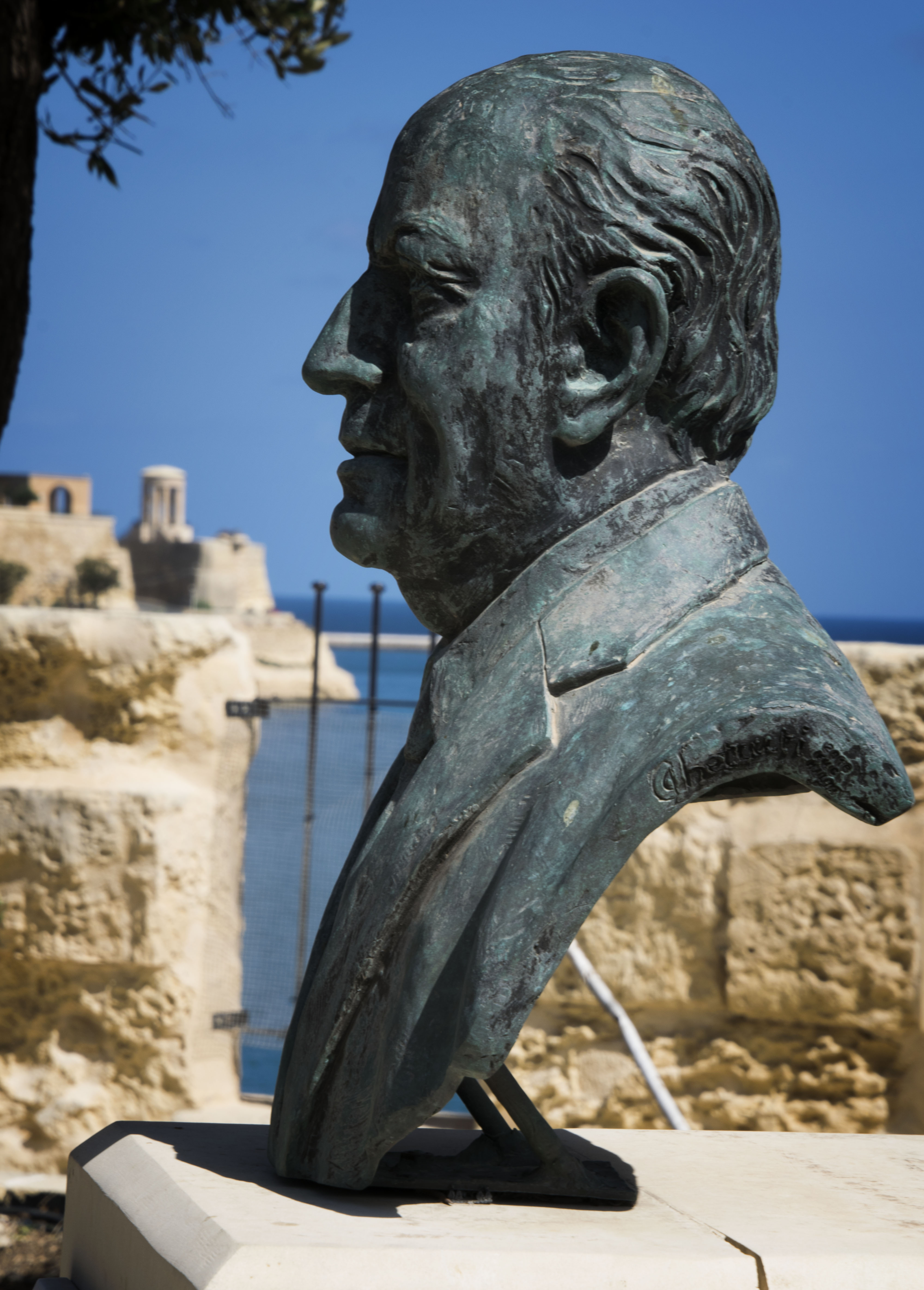
- Bust of Clews at the Gardjola gardens in Senglea
- Born: September 27, 1919. Senglea, Malta
- Died: January 29, 2009 (aged 89)
- Occupation(s): comic actor, script writer
- Children: 8

Charles Clews (September 27, 1919 – January 29, 2009) was a Maltese comic actor and script writer. Clews was one of the first contributors to the local Maltese radio (then Rediffusion). He found solace in his mother-in-law about whom he used to joke constantly, depicting her as a monster when in fact she had been an angel. He married in 1943 and had eight children; Hilary (deceased), Miriam, Jane, Irene, Norman, Kenneth, Alan and Kevin. He was born in Senglea, Malta.

== Acting career ==
Clews worked as a marine surveyor at the Admiralty Dockyard complex (now Malta Shipyards), from where he left to start a career in journalism.

During his lifetime, his greatest love was the stage and the radio. He started acting in Senglea, but his acting career was established in concerts for the workers at the dockyards during the constant bombardment during the Second World War, with air-raids frequently cutting shows short. The authorities encouraged the raising of morale in the face of grave danger that workers faced in their perilous work. His jokes kept the men laughing even during heavy bombardments.

He was the backbone of The Stage Commandos, the stage company that came out with a new style of comedy in 1945 and was very popular all over the island, having performed in all the principal theatres of the two islands. Their repertoire included sketches, plays and musicals. The Stage Commandos had won the “Bajda u Ħamra” award in the one act play competition at the Radio City Theatre in 1947.

Clews was the driving force of the Radju Muskettieri (The Radio Musketeers). Although he worked closely with a number of other well known personalities, his closest partner was Johnny Catania. Other well known actors in his team included Gemma Portelli, Armando Urso, Vitorin Galea, Johnny Navarro, Terry L. Bencini, Josette Ciappara, Nosì Ghirlando and Guża Caruana.

== Entertaining the nation ==
During a period when the listeners had very little to amuse them, Clews and his friends used to keep the Maltese islands laughing from programme to programme. Apart from his own series, Clews also helped in children’s programmes. He and Johnny Catania never missed one of the Christmas parties for needy children. Later on, during the 1970s he invented the weekly comic adventures of the mischievous boy "Fredu Frendo Sghendo" played by Johnny Navarro, who used to amuse the young (and not so young) listeners with his (mis)adventures.

Persons of a certain age can still hum some of his limericks and funny songs. It is understood that there are a number of recordings with his comical sketches. Perhaps his greatest success was the comical soap opera “Karmena Abdilla” which had a run of some two years culminating in a sumptuous wedding on the Radio City Theatre stage. Played by Nosi Ghirlando, the play was repeated in nearly every hall in Malta, Gozo and abroad.

== Success abroad ==
Considering the many thousands of Maltese who have settled in Australia, many musicians and actors are regularly invited to present shows down-under. Clews had been invited twice. The first time was in November 1964 when he amused his audience together with another comic, Johnny Navarro. In November 1984 he travelled with his buddy Johnny Catania when they had huge success all over Australia.

== Other activities ==
For three years (1955 to 58) he was appointed as Chairman of the Stage and Film Censors Board. Even with arthritis, Clews kept himself busy until his death. Since 1959, for 47 years, he wrote a weekly humorous column in the Maltese newspaper It-Torċa and the Antenna Magazine. Some of his works include: Ali Babì, Hotel Żewwiġni and Don Rodrigo (all three being musical comedies); l-Imgermda (an adaptation of Cinderella), many sketches, one act comedies and plays

As a token of appreciation, in December 1996 Clews was awarded the Midalja għall-Qadi tar-Repubblika (The Medal for Services to the Republic), and two years later he was awarded the Trophy for a lifetime entertainment to the nation.
