= Joe Julian Farrugia =

Maltese writer (born 1962)

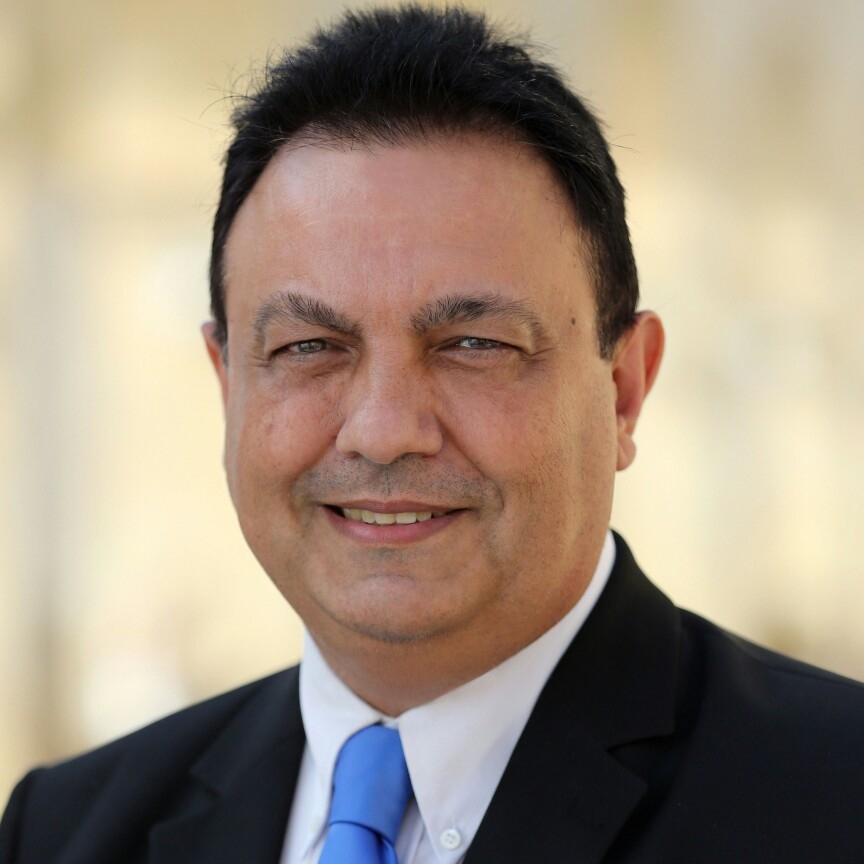
- Farrugia in 2015
- Born: 9 April 1962 (age 64); Gżira, Crown Colony of Malta
- Occupation: Media Co-Ordinator
- Employer: Malta Philharmonic Orchestra

Joe Julian Farrugia (born 9 April 1962) is a writer, songwriter and broadcaster from Malta.

He was born in Gżira but moved to Paola at the age of 5. He is the youngest sibling and only son of Francis and Beatrix. He attended St. Paul's Missionary College of Rabat. In 1979, Farrugia won the Anna Muscat Azzopardi prize in the Maltese language and literature from the University of Malta.

In his thirties, Farrugia started to publish his writings. Initially some of his poems were published in local Maltese newspapers. Later on he started to write the lyrics for songs. He took part in many song contests in Malta and abroad. In 1995, he won the Best Lyrics Award at the Għarb Festival in Gozo with "Għajn ta' Sliem". In 1999, he won the same award in L-Għanja tal-Poplu with "Faraġ ta' Xejn". He also wrote the lyrics for winning songs at the Konkors Kanzunetta Indipendenza in 2005 with "Ix-Xemx mill-Ġdid" and the Festival Internazzjonali tal-Kanzunetta Maltija 2013 with "Hawn mill-Ġdid" and Mużika Mużika 2021 with "Ħarsa Biss".

Farrugia wrote for Malta in several international song contests. He won the Discovery International Pop Music Festival of Bulgaria twice with songs "Endlessly" in 2003 and "Time for Love" in 2006.

His songwriting won five times in the International Festival For Children Ti Amo, held in Romania. In 1999, American Airlines included one of his songs "Jekk Għada Ma Jisbaħx" on their playlist, available whenever any passenger requested a song in Maltese. Joe Julian also wrote two musicals in English and three Christmas pantos in Maltese.

In 2005, his songs "Life is a Train", sung by Karen Polidano, was included by NBT Records (U.S.) in a compilation disc about trains.

In 2008, Ivan and Stani sang his song "You Are Magic" in Bulgaria's national selection, EuroBGvision, for the Eurovision Song Contest.

Farrugia also wrote several drama episodes for Maltese television series. These include popular sitcoms like Il-Prinċipal, Simpatiċi and XplaħħMalħajt. He also has his own blog named "Kif Naħsibha Jien".

In 1993, through One Radio, Farrugia ventured into the field of broadcasting. Two years later, he switched over to television and produced shows such as Menz, Dr Peel, Medik, Indigo, Is-Saħħa Sabiħa and Xalamita. He wrote, directed and produced the majority of the episodes of the award-winning documentary biographical series Bijografiji and other features for the popular Friday night TVM programme Xarabank. From these, he won three awards in broadcasting from the Institute of Maltese Journalists.

From 3-5 November 2017, at St. James Cavalier Theatre in Valletta, actress Sarah Camilleri was the protagonist of a monologue "Qaħba Jien?" (Am I a Whore?) written and produced by Farrugia and directed by Mario Micallef. The following year, through 9-11 November, Farrugia's drama moved to the acclaimed Manoel Theatre, Europe's oldest standing theatre, with the satirical comedy "Festa tal-Qaddisin".

"Elfejn u Tmintax" (Two Thousand and Eighteen), a national choral symphony, was written by Farrugia premiered on 20 January 2018 on the steps of St John's Co-Cathedral. This was commissioned for the inauguration ceremony of "Valletta 2018" during European Capital of Culture. The music was composed by Elton Zarb.

Farrugia was the producer and presenter of the programmes "Radju Kafé ma' Joe Julian" and "Għamlu Isem" on the national radio station Radju Malta. His programme on the same station was "Bonġu Kafé ma' Joe Julian" which includes a blog "Waqt il-Kafé".

Farrugia has also published a series of books titled "Għamlu Isem". They include biographies and material from the radio series by the same name.

Recently, he wrote songs for the Malta Eurovision Song Contest, including "Qalb ma' qalb" by Adria Twins and "Lalaratatakeke lalaratakabum" by Kantera in 2025, and "Nerġa' nqum" by Adria Twins in 2026.

Farrugia is married to Marlene (née Camilleri) and they have two daughters: Clara, a television presenter/producer, and Valentina, a singer.
