= Jon Lukas =

Maltese musician (1948–2021)

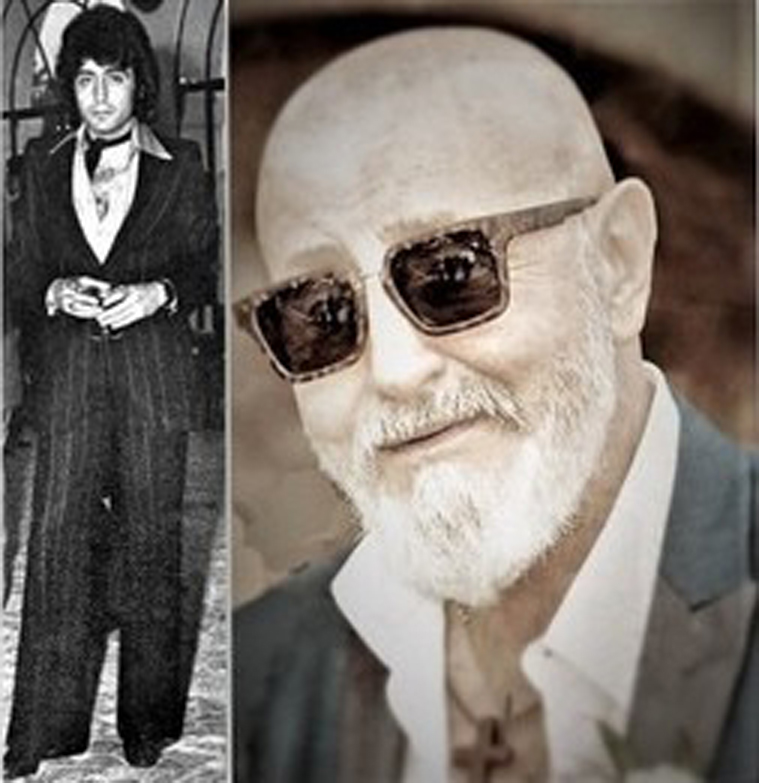
Lukas in 1971 and in 2017

Jon Lukas (11 September 1948 – 11 June 2021), known as Woodenman, was a Maltese musician from Paola, Malta. He was the first solo artist in Maltese music history to achieve successful foreign pop chart placements in a number of non-native countries and to obtain a major global record company deal.

== Career ==
Jon's record “Can’t Afford To Lose”, composed by Gary Benson, released in 1970, became an international hit. “Apart from making it to the Top 40 charts in some European territories, “Can't Afford To Lose” occupied the top place in the pop charts in Lebanon for a full month, holding back The Beatles' “The Long and Winding Road” from reaching the No.1 spot.

In 1993, Lukas, accompanied by Marita, placed second in that year's Malta Song Festival with his own composition “Żommni u Għannaqni”. This was the first time that Lukas sang in his native Maltese language. The English version of this song, entitled “The Love We Share”, was produced by Indian-British music producer Biddu.

In 1998, Jon formed the band “Woodenman”. They recorded an album which topped the “Peoplesound” charts throughout August 1999”. They had gigs in Barcelona and Madrid. When they disbanded, Lukas incorporated the band's name and became known as Jon Lukas Woodenman.

On 15 April 2009, Lukas started off a radio programme entitled “Woodenman’s Jukebox” on Malta's One Radio. This programme is still being transmitted on U.K.'s Channel Radio.

In the summer of 2008, Marc Storace of Krokus paid tribute to Lukas' 'Can't Afford to Lose'. During his concert, on the island of Gozo, Lukas surprised the audience as he emerged to sing the last half of the song in duet with Storace.

After a long illness, Jon died on 11 June 2021.

== Discography ==
| Title | Year | Label & record ID |
|---|---|---|
| Can't Afford to Lose / Can’t Make You Mine | 1970 | Columbia (DB 8736) |
| This Time / Summer Sun | 1972 | Satril (SAT 3) |
| Fleur / Now That You’re Gone | 1974 | ZINA (Z 100) |
| Love / She’s A Girl | 197? | Anthony D’Amato (A.D. 6044) |
| It Doesn’t Really Matter Now / Johnny There’s a Message For You | 197? | Centre - (RC 1013 42) |
| Żommni u Għannaqni / The Love We Share (With Marita) | 1993 | Cassette - Malta Song For Europe 1993 |
| My Time (Woodenman) | 1998 | Digital Download |
| Far Away (orchestrated version) (acoustic version) | 2007 | Digital Download |
| Better Man | 2007 | Digital Download |
| Never Go Away (original version) (Scott Walker CodeRed Mix) | 2011 | Digital Download |
| Theme from Xablott | 2012 | Digital Download |
| Ain't No Mountain (Tribute to Marvin Gaye) | 2012 | Digital Download |
| Bad News | 2013 | Digital Download |
| Older-Better? (Original & Live Version) | 2014 | Digital Download |
| Regent Street (Lyndsay ft.Jon Lukas Woodenman) | 2014 | Digital Download |
