= Kantilena (band) =

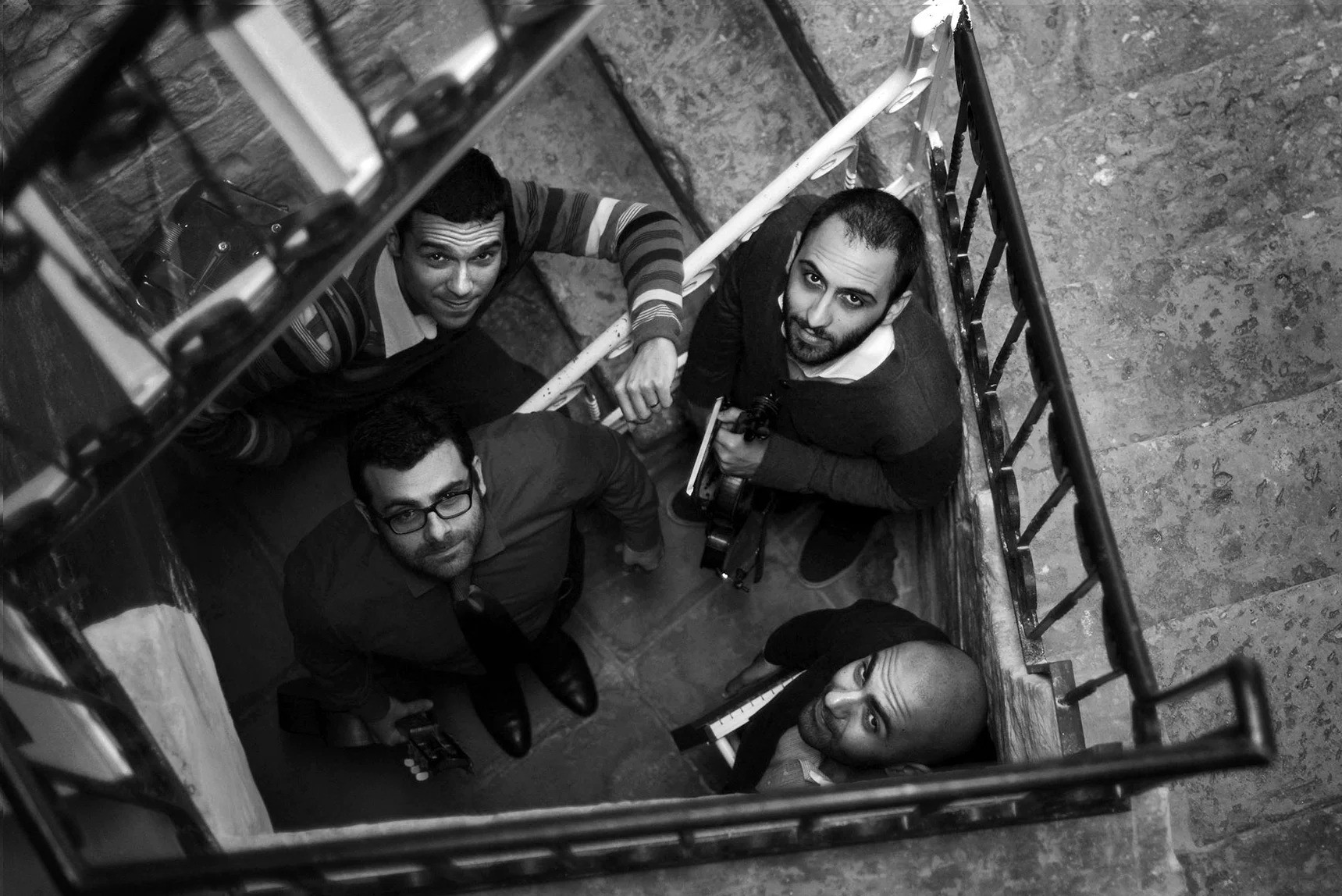
- Kantilena in 2014. Clockwise, from top-right: James Baldacchino, Alessandro Lia, Drinu Camilleri, Albert Garzia

Background information
- Origin: Malta
- Genres: Maltese contemporary folk; folk music; folk revival
- Years active: 2009–2016

Kantilena was a Maltese contemporary folk band active from 2009 to 2016. Blending Maltese poetic language with contemporary folk instrumentation, they emerged as part of the 2000s–2010s revival of Maltese folk aesthetics and became recognised contributors to that movement.

== History ==
=== Formation and early years (2009–2011) ===
The band was formed in 2009 by James Baldacchino (violin, viola), Drinu Camilleri (guitar, vocals), and Alessandro Lia (piano, vocals). Composer Albert Garzia (accordion) joined in 2011, expanding the ensemble's harmonic and textural palette.

=== Intimate unplugged concerts and artistic development (2011–2013) ===
Between 2011 and 2013, Kantilena developed a reputation for intimate, often unplugged performances sometimes held in historically significant Maltese venues. Some were invitation-only events, including a performance at the Oratorju San Ġużepp in Birgu. Footage from this concert was used in the official video for Il-Ballata ta’ Nenu.

During this period, critics noted the ensemble's “tight front” and expressive instrumental interplay along with strong on-stage chemistry and emotional delivery.

=== L-Għanja tal-Poplu 2012 ===
In 2012, Kantilena competed in L-Għanja tal-Poplu with the song Baħħar. They placed third overall, and Camilleri, author of the song's text, won the festival's Best Singer-Songwriter Award. The track, inspired by the Maltese folk motif Lanċa Ġejja u Oħra Sejra, became one of the band's most recognisable works.

=== Album release and mid-period activity (2014) ===
Kantilena released their debut and only album Senduq on 31 May 2014. The launch featured a one-off expanded ensemble of twelve musicians performing at the Greek Theatre of the San Ġorġ Preca college in Blata l-Bajda, intended to reproduce the album's arrangements as faithfully as possible — a configuration the band noted was unlikely to be repeated.

The release was supported with a number of performances that included the Earth Garden Festival, the Malta Mediterranean Literature Festival, and Għanafest, expanding their presence within Malta's broader cultural scene.

In the months leading up to the album launch, Kantilena released a series of location-based music videos that attracted wide attention. Their video for Stumalla was filmed live on a sightseeing train in Rabat, followed by X’Ubidù, recorded during a mini-performance at the Crystal Palace pastizzeria in Rabat. A live version of Il-Ballata ta’ Nenu was recorded at the Oratorju San Ġużepp in Vittoriosa, while their final pre-release single, Ġaħan, featured imagery drawn from Maltese folklore.

The album's year-long production involved extensive rewriting of existing material, with some pieces undergoing major structural changes, and resulted in the creation of two new tracks. The band described their aim as making both past and contemporary elements of Maltese culture accessible to modern audiences, shaping an aesthetic that reflected their diverse influences and collaborative working process. The recording sessions involved a wide range of guest musicians and instruments — including trumpet, trombone, euphonium, clarinet, viola, cello and mandolin — contributing to the album's expanded sound world.

By the end of the year, founding member Alessandro Lia left the group.

=== Later activity and final documented performances (2016) ===
In March 2016, Kantilena appeared with the Malta Youth Orchestra at Teatru Manoel in the event Butterfly Project: The Beginnings.

Their final documented performance occurred on 9 July, 2016 as special guests at L-Għanja tal-Poplu 2016 at Pjazza Teatru Rjal. After 2016, the group ceased public activity.

== Musical style ==
Kantilena's style combined Maltese poetic lyricism with a contemporary folk framework. Their music featured a balanced interplay of acoustic instruments accompanying narrative, often introspective lyrics.

Lyrics were primarily written by Lia and Camilleri, addressing themes of introspection, nostalgia, and everyday experience. The group consistently incorporated traditional Maltese motifs, such as the tune Lanċa Ġejja u Oħra Sejra referenced in Baħħar, situating their work within a renewed interest in Maltese-language songwriting in the early 2010s.

== Members ==
- James Baldacchino – violin, viola (2009–2016)
- Drinu Camilleri – guitar, vocals, songwriter (2009–2016)
- Alessandro Lia – piano, vocals (2009–2014)
- Albert Garzia – accordion (2011–2016)
- Notable collaborators: Debbie Axisa Farrell (vocals), Manuel Pulis (drums)
