= Joe Tanti =

Maltese radio and television presenter

Joe Tanti (born 24 May 1959) is a popular Maltese radio and TV presenter, actor and a prominent campaigner for children's rights in the fight against child abuse in Malta. Joe is one of the most known voices in the Maltese radio sphere having worked on 8 different radio stations. He is also a known face on local television having been involved in television productions on 4 different TV stations, both as actor and presenter. Other acting work includes theatre and feature film productions.

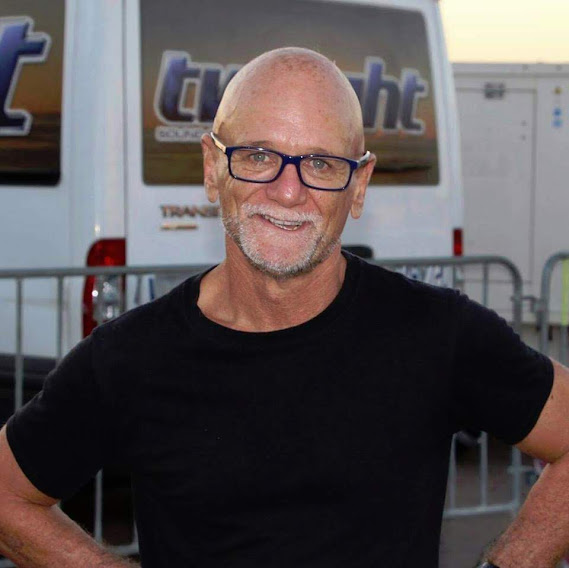

Joe is associated with Rock music due to his involvement with Rock DJing both on radio and the local club scene. However, in recent years Joe has presented the Breakfast Shows on three different radio stations. He won several awards in Malta for his radio shows including best radio presenter and best program.

Joe has been involved in politics since 1998. He is renowned for strongly supporting causes and people who reflect his beliefs.

== Early life and family ==
=== Family ===
Joe Tanti was born on 24 May 1959 in Pietà, Malta. He is the second of four children to Joseph and Louise Tanti. His father, Joseph, was a headmaster and pharmacist (died 2000); his mother, a pianist (died 2020).

He lived most of his childhood in Sta Lucia. Throughout his life, Joe has, to date, changed residence 19 times. He spent two years in the Libyan desert between 1981 and 1983. He has been married twice, both marriages ending in separation and divorce.

"When it comes to break-ups, I have remixed the song, rewrote the book and outworn the T-shirt".

Joe relocated to Xaghra in Gozo in 2018 quitting his breakfast show on One radio after 13 years. In 2020, Joe started a Saturday afternoon rock show on One Radio with lifelong friend John Bundy. When asked on his decision to quit presenting bfast shows, Joe said "I want to wake up with my family and share breakfast. Say good morning like a normal father. I don't recall ever having breakfast with any of my sons before they left for school".

=== Education ===
Joe received his formal education at Savio College Secondary school. During his days at Savio College, he discovered his love of cross-country training, a hobby he still enjoys up to this day.

After finishing his secondary studies, he enrolled at The Malta College of Arts Science and Technology to study Hotel and Catering Management. Always a believer in lifelong learning, in 2006 Joe started reading for a diploma in Diplomatic Studies at the University of Malta. He successfully finished his studies in 2008.

== Acting ==
Apart from radio, a career spanning 35 years, Joe Tanti started working on TV in 1987 in a series of TV programmes on music and entertainment. He started acting in 2005 in theatres in Malta, most notably Maltese Productions such as Sleeping Beauty, the Pantomime in 2005 and musicals such as The Secret Garden in 2005 and The Sound of Music in 2017.

=== TV series and movies ===
- Deceduti (2008)
- Deceduti wara l ahhar tad dinja (2012)
- Qlub Imwegggha (Broken Hearts) (2014)
- Division 7 (2016)
- The Madame Blanc Mysteries (2021)
- Casper and Emma: The Golden Ring from Atlantis (2023)
- Cookie Box (2024)
- Compulsion (2025)

== Politics ==
=== Nationalist Party ===
Was

=== Labour Party ===
Is

=== Campaigner against child abuse. ===
In 1995, Joe created an event inviting listeners on a Bay Radio where he hosted a mid-morning show to bring Christmas gift for children who will spending Christmas in hospital suffering from child abuse. This success of this event triggered an awareness on the subject. Press conferences that eventually led to the creation of 179 support line. In 2011, his research paper entitled 'The Rights and Future of Unaccompanied Minors and Children Born to Irregular Immigrants in Malta' was quoted in Strasburg during the April session of the Parliamentary Assembly of the Council of Europe debate on unaccompanied children in Europe. Today Joe sits on the Advisory board for Children and Young People.
