= Helen and Joseph =

Maltese singing duo

- Origin: Malta
- Genres: Pop
- Years active: 1972–2024
- Label: Rediffusion
- Members: Joe Cutajar; Helen Micallef

Helen and Joseph was a Maltese singing duo consisting of Joe Cutajar and Helen Micallef, best known for their participation in the Eurovision Song Contest 1972, held in Edinburgh, Scotland.

The duo briefly reunited at the Malta Eurovision Song Contest in 2022, singing "L-imħabba" on the 50th anniversary of their participation.

== Before Helen and Joseph ==
=== Helen Micallef ===
Helen Micallef
- Born: 8 May 1950; Birkirkara, Malta
- Died: 5 February 2026 (aged 75)
- Years active: 1960–2026
- Formerly of: The Links; Helen and Joseph
- Partner: Joe Cutajar

Helen Micallef was born on 8 May 1950 in Birkirkara, Malta. The fourth of eight children, she was the sibling of fellow Eurovision entrant Renato, who went on to represent Malta at the Eurovision Song Contest 1975 in Stockholm, Sweden. Micallef began her singing career at the age of ten years old when took part in a song festival with her sister in the hall of St. Aloysius College. At 14, she joined the group The Four Links, which consisted of Joe Muscat, John B. Gove and Edwin Vella.

After numerous line-up changes, Elio Calleja joined the group and they simply renamed to The Links. In 1966, they won second place in a Sicilian Song Contest. Later that year, Micallef left the group to begin her career as a soloist. The group went on to enter into multiple Maltese national finals, even competing with Micallef in 1972.

In 1967, she won a song contest against Albano and Mia Martini amongst others, who both would also go on to Eurovision on multiple occasions. With this victory, Micallef played concerts in Rome and Florence and represented Malta in another International Festival held in the city of Sopot in Poland.

After this, she remained active in various television programs, Nightclubs and Hotels. In 1968, Helen won the Malta Song Festival with the song "Tu ora capirai" written by composer Carmelo Zammit. In 1969, Helen finished in 2nd place at the Malta Song Festival with the song "Qawsalla" written by composer F. X. Pisani.

Micallef died on 5 February 2026, at the age of 75.

=== Joe Cutajar ===
Joe Cutajar
- Cutajar in 2022

Background information
- Born: 27 January 1941; Valletta, Malta
- Died: March 2024 (aged 83)
- Formerly of: Helen and Joseph
- Partner: Helen Micallef

Joe Cutajar was born in Valletta on 27 January 1941. In 1969, he participated in the Malta Song Festival (where Helen also participated, finishing second) and won the prize for Best Singer. Joe Cutajar died in March 2024, at the age of 83.

== At Eurovision ==
Cutajar won Song For Europe 1972, the Maltese national final, on 12 January 1972 with the song "L-imħabba". Despite winning solo, Micallef accompanied him in Edinburgh. She had finished third with the song "Għasfur taċ-ċomb".

At the contest, the duo performed in vibrant red polka dots. They finished last with 48 points, getting the minimum amount of 2 points from 10 out of 18 juries—their highest mark was six votes from the United Kingdom.

Awards and achievements
Preceded by Joe Grech with "Marija l-Maltija"	Malta in the Eurovision Song Contest; 1972	Succeeded by Renato with "Singing This Song"
