= Xirka Ġieħ ir-Repubblika =

Society of honour

Awarded by Malta
- Type: Order
- Motto: "Għall-Ġid tal-Maltin" (for the benefit of the Maltese)
- Awarded for: exceptional merit in the service of Malta or, humanity as a whole
- Status: Currently constituted
- Head of the Order: President of Malta
- Grades: Member; Honorary Member

Precedence
- Next (higher): Order of Merit
- Next (lower): Medal for Bravery
- Ribbon bar of the order

The Xirka Ġieħ ir-Repubblika is a society of honour that offers membership to those who have demonstrated exceptional merit in the service of Malta or of humanity. Its motto is Għall-Ġid tal-Maltin ("For the Benefit of the Maltese").

== Award ==
The Xirka is limited to twenty members. With the exception of honorary members, the number of new members may not exceed three persons for every two years. Once the maximum number of members has been met, a new member cannot be appointed until a vacancy occurs.

Maltese nationals and distinguished citizens of other countries may be appointed as honorary members of the Xirka. Members and honorary members are legally entitled to have the initials "S.Ġ." (Sieħeb il-Ġieħ) placed after their names.

== Insignia ==
The Badge of the Order, an enameled representation of La Valletta's Bartizan, is surrounded by a white band with golden inscriptions. The order's motto appears at the top and its name, "Ġieħ ir-Repubblika" at the bottom. The whole is surrounded by a gold and green wreath of laurel leaves. Additionally, hanging over a golden dove resting on a golden band is the order's s date of establishment: 1975.

The breast-star of the Order has the same design as the badge, but resting on a radiating golden sun.

The ribbon of the Order is red with two white borders.

== Notable honorary members ==
- Queen Elizabeth II, S.Ġ. 23 November 2005
- Queen Sofia of Spain, S.Ġ. 25 November 2009
- Colonel Muammar Gaddafi, S.Ġ. 5 December 1975 (revoked 26 August 2011)
- Giovanni Leone, President of Italy, S.Ġ. 6 December 1975
- Li Xiannian, President of China, S.Ġ. 22 November 1984
- Kim Il-sung, President of North Korea, S.Ġ. 1 August 1985
- José Manuel Barroso, S.Ġ. 10 October 1994
- President Carlo Azeglio Ciampi, of Italy, S.Ġ. 19 May 2005
- President Vaira Vīķe-Freiberga, of Latvia, S.Ġ. 19 June 2006
- General Harald Kujat
- Ingrid Rüütel, wife of Arnold Rüütel, President of Estonia, S.Ġ. 1 October 2003
- Imants Freibergs, husband of Vaira Vīķe-Freiberga, S.Ġ. 16 February 2004
- Fotini Papadopoulos, wife of Tassos Papadopoulos (President of Cyprus), S.Ġ. 17 February 2005
- Kateryna Yushchenko, wife of Viktor Yushchenko, President of Ukraine, S.Ġ. 9 July 2008
- Maria Alves da Silva Cavaco Silva, wife of Aníbal Cavaco Silva, President of Portugal, S.Ġ. 12 November 2008
- Maria Kaczyńska, First Lady of Poland, S.Ġ. 26 January 2009
- Zorka Parvanova, wife of Georgi Parvanov, President of Bulgaria, S.Ġ. 20 October 2009
- Maria Băsescu, wife of Traian Băsescu, President of Romania, S.Ġ. 30 June 2010
- Günter Verheugen, S.Ġ. 17 March 2004
- George Iacovou, Cypriot Minister of Foreign Affairs, S.Ġ. 17 February 2005
- Dalia Grybauskaitė, President of Lithuania, S.Ġ. 29 May 2012
- Donald Tusk, S.Ġ. 13 December 2017
- Louis Grech, S.Ġ. 13 December 2017
- George Vella, S.Ġ. 13 December 2017
