= Midalja għall-Qlubija =

Medal for Bravery
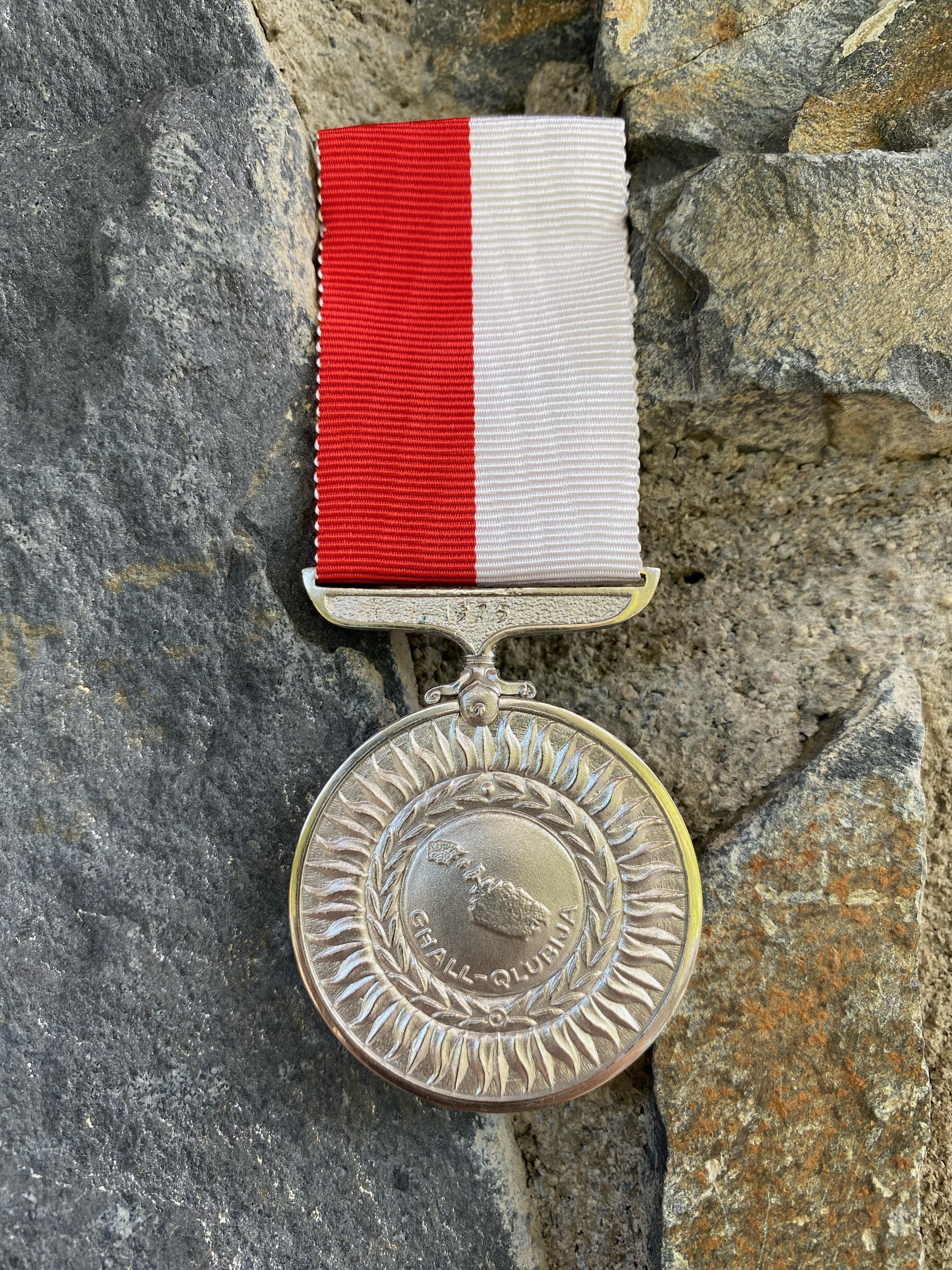
- Medal for Bravery, first type (1975)
- Type: Bravery Medal
- Awarded for: Acts of exceptional bravery
- Description: Circular cupro-nickel medal
- Country: Malta
- Presented by: the President of Malta
- Eligibility: Citizens of Malta and other countries
- Post-nominals: M.R.Q.
- Established: 1975
- Ribbon bar

Precedence
- Next (higher): Member of the National Order of Merit
- Next (lower): Midalja għall-Qadi tar-Repubblika

The Medal for Bravery (Midalja għall-Qlubija) is an official honor of the Republic of Malta. It is awarded by the President of Malta, with the written approval of the Prime Minister of Malta, to individuals who have performed exceptional acts of bravery. The award is primarily presented to Maltese citizens but may be awarded to foreigners on an honorary basis for acts which merit recognition by Malta. The medal may be awarded posthumously.

Recipients of the medal are entitled to use the post-nominal M.R.Q.

== Appearance ==
The Medal for Bravery is a silver medal 40 mm (1.6 in) in diameter. In the first type, the obverse bears the Coat of Arms of Malta used between 1975 and 1988 superimposed over a 48 ray sunburst design. The second type changed the emblem for the Coat of Arms of Malta in 1988. The reverse depicts, in relief, a map of the Maltese Islands. The map is surrounded by a wreath. Below the wreath is the inscription Għall-Qlubija (For Bravery). Like the obverse, the reverse is also superimposed over a 48 ray sunburst design. The medal hangs from a bar suspension with the inscription 1975. The ribbon of the medal is 32 mm (1.3 in) wide half red and half white. When worn by a lady, the ribbon is fashioned into a bow.

== Recipients ==
From its creation in 1975 until 2016, eight medals have been awarded:

- PC Raymond Bonnici, M.R.Q. (1997)
- Ivan Ciantar, M.R.Q. (posthumously) (1997)
- PC Roger Debattista, M.R.Q. (posthumously) (2001)
- Mario Azzopardi, M.R.Q (2002)
- Richard Bates, M.R.Q. (2006)
- SSgt. Roger Mulvaney, M.R.Q. (2007)
- James Muscat, M.R.Q. (2009)
- Karl Curmi, M.R.Q. (2015)

== See also ==
- Orders, decorations, and medals of Malta
