= Ġemma Portelli =

Maltese actress

- Born: 30 September 1932; Valletta, Malta
- Died: 21 February 2008 (aged 75); Valletta, Malta
- Occupation: Actress

Ġemma Portelli (née Schembri in Valletta, 30 September 1932 – Valletta, 21 February 2008) was a Maltese actress.

== Life and career ==
Portelli's interest in drama started at a young age, when she would set up her own stage and produce her own plays to entertain other children.

Her professional career took off in 1957, when she joined the Rediffusion show titled Radju Muskettieri together with fellow actors Charles Clews and Johnny Catania. During the sixties she founded a production company together with her husband; the company, which was called The Bluebirds, produced and presented a children's programme.

In the late seventies, Portelli starred in the first Maltese language television series F'Baħar Wieħed (1976). On this show, she played a character named Ġoma, an outspoken, gossiping but good-natured woman. In an interview, writer and co-star of F'Baħar Wieħed, Lino Grech, once said that he wrote the part especially for her.

Portelli is also known for presenting a series of Maltese comedy shows titled Fuq Tlieta Toqgħod il-Borma (1980).

Portelli also played major roles at the Royal Opera House in Valletta (now known as It-Teatru Rjal), including Ġesù ta' Nazzarett, Is-Salib tal-Fidda and It-Tieġ ta' Karmena Abdilla.

After the death of her husband, Paul Portelli, on 29 January 2001, her health began to decline. In spite of health issues, she took part in what would be her final production – a Maltese television series titled Ta' Ħorrox Borrox.

== Awards ==
In the year 2000, Portelli was awarded the Medal for Service to the Republic (Midalja Ġieħ ir-Repubblika) while in 2007 she was awarded the Charles Arrigo Lifetime Achievement Award during the Malta Television Awards.

Portelli died on 22 February 2008 at the age of 75, with the funeral service being held at St Joseph Parish Church in Msida on 24 February 2008. She was buried in a private chapel at the Santa Maria Addolorata Cemetery in Paola, the largest burial ground in Malta.

== Selected filmography ==
- Radju Muskettieri (1957)
- F'Baħar Wieħed (1976)
- Fuq Tlieta Toqgħod il-Borma (1980)
