= Tony Camilleri =

Maltese singer (born 1949)

Tony Camilleri (born 17 January 1949 in Sliema, Crown Colony of Malta) is a Maltese singer widely known as L-Għannej (the Singer).

== Successes ==
In the 1970s, his most successful songs were L-Għannej, Rajt Ma Rajtx, Imħabba f'Kemmuna, and Ħabibi l-Parrukkier.

Some of Camilleri's later successes were Tal-Laqam, It-Tieġ tan-Neputija, Iz-Zekzieka, Il-Bagalja tal-Injam, and Tifħira lil Malta.

== Personal life ==
Camilleri suffers from transient global amnesia.
