= Youth Travel Circle =

- Formation: 1967
- Type: Youth organisation
- Headquarters: Valletta, Malta
- Official language: Maltese
- Website: http://ytc.org.mt/

Youth Travel Circle is Maltese youth organisation for people between ages of 16 and 30. It's mostly known for organising annual music festival L-Ghanja tal-Poplu and for running Verdala Youth Hostel.

== History ==
Youth Travel Circle (YTC) was founded in 1967 as part of church's "Emigrants' Commission" to help and cater youth coming abroad to Malta. YTC started also to organize travel for Maltese youths who helped organizing activities to guests. When travel became more widespread and several travel agencies started organizing tours, original aim YTC was founded for became less important and YTC became more of a social organisation. It was founded in 1967 by Rev. Fr. Maurice Mifsud, a Roman Catholic Priest from Birkirkara Malta.
