= Midalja għall-Qadi tar-Repubblika =

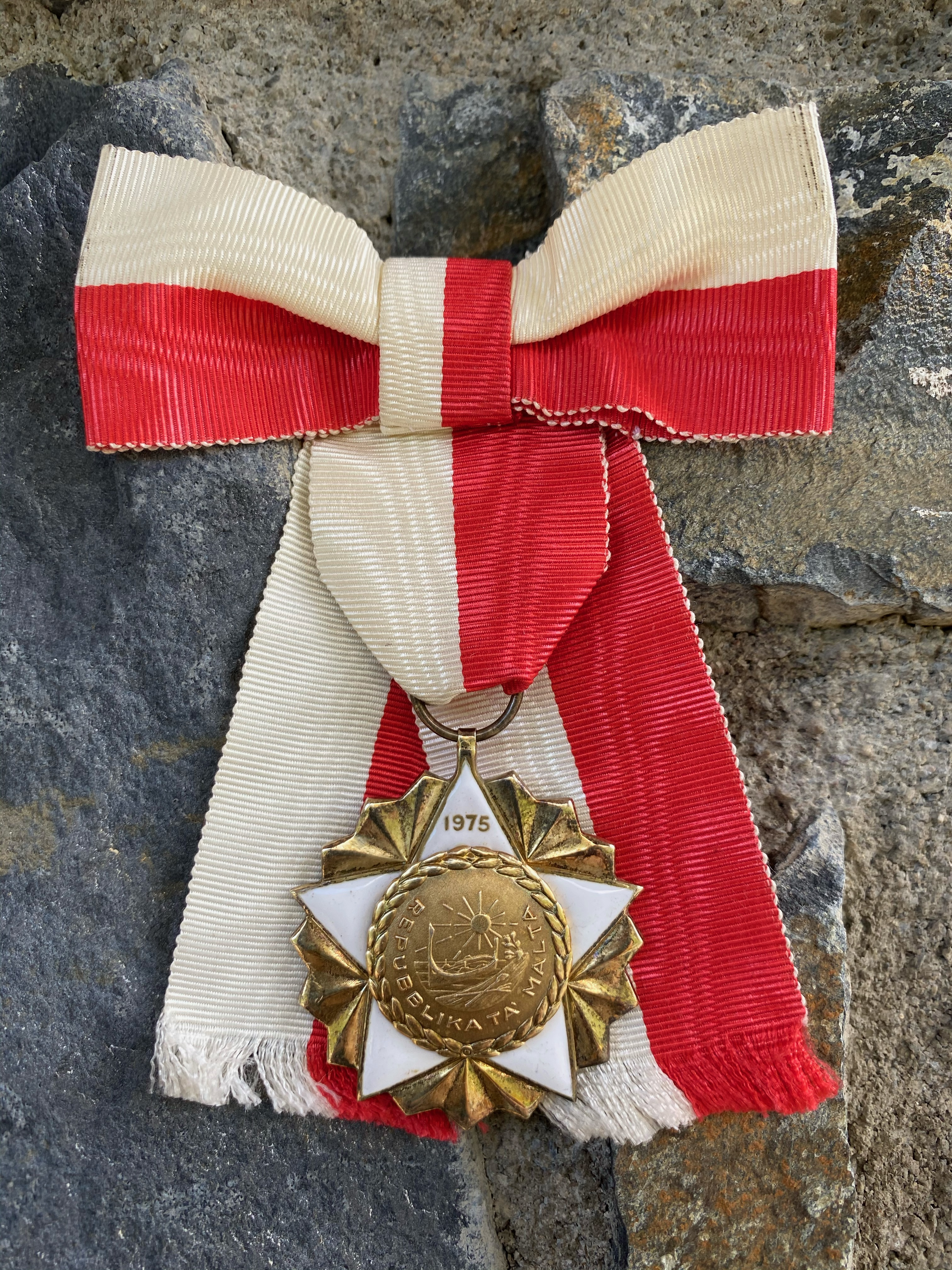
- Medal first type (1975) for ladies
- Type: State decoration
- Awarded for: Distinguished service to Malta.
- Country: Malta
- Presented by: the President of Malta
- Eligibility: Citizens and organizations of Malta. Foreign citizens may receive the medal on an honorary basis.
- Post-nominals: M.Q.R.
- Ribbon bar of the medal

Precedence
- Next (higher): Midalja għall-Qlubija
- Next (lower): National Commemorative Medals

The Midalja għall-Qadi tar-Repubblika (Medal for Service to the Republic) is a medal of the Republic of Malta. The medal is awarded by the President of Malta, with the written approval of the Prime Minister of Malta, for distinguished service to Malta. The award is presented to Maltese citizens and organizations, but may be awarded to foreigners on an honorary basis for service which merits recognition. No more than ten Maltese citizens may be awarded the medal over the course of a year. The medal may be awarded posthumously.

Recipients of the medal are entitled to use the post-nominal M.Q.R.

== Appearance ==
The Midalja għall-Qadi tar-Repubblika is a five-pointed white enamel star 41 mm (1.6 in) wide with beveled rays between the arms of the star. The obverse bears the Coat of Arms of Malta on a gold colored metal disc superimposed over the star. The top point of the star bears the inscription 1975 in gold. The reverse depicts, in relief, a map of the Maltese Islands. The map is surrounded by a wreath. Below the wreath is the inscription Għall-Qadi tar-Repubblika (For Service to the Republic). The ribbon of the medal is 32 mm (1.3 in) wide half white and half red. When worn by a lady, the ribbon is fashioned into a bow.

== See also ==
- Orders, decorations, and medals of Malta
