= Sandra and Andres =

Dutch-Indonesian pop duo

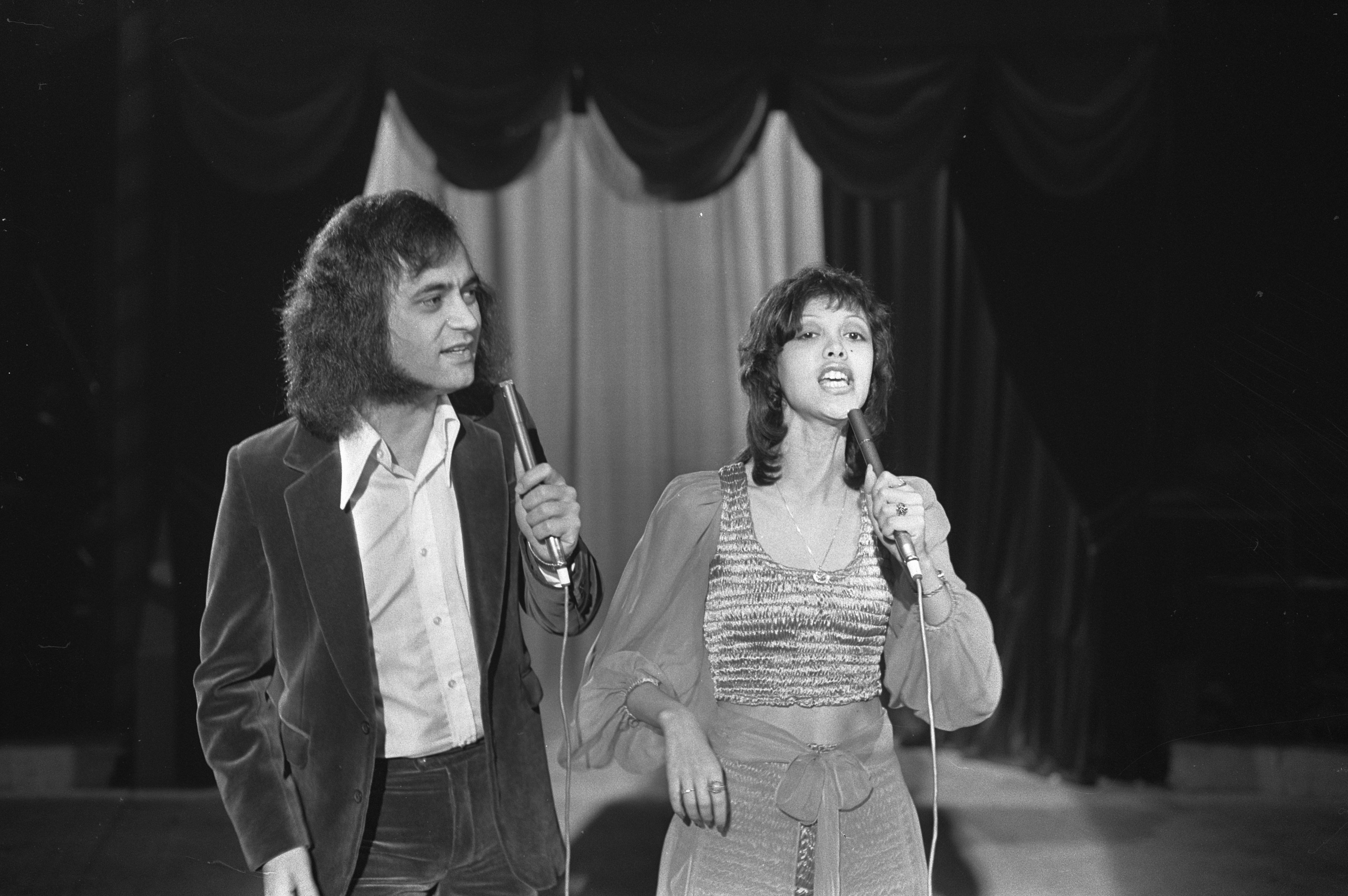
- Sandra and Andres (1972)

Background information
- Origin: Netherlands
- Genre: Pop music
- Years active: 1968 - 1975
- Labels: Philips, Hansa
- Past members: Sandra Reemer, Andreas Dries Holten

Sandra and Andres was a successful Dutch-Indonesian pop duo consisting of Sandra Reemer and Andres Holten. As a duo they had nearly thirty singles released.

== Background ==
In 1967 / 1968, their single "Storybook children" bw "Just a minute" was released on the Philips label.

In 1972 they represented the Netherlands at the Eurovision Song Contest with their song "Als het om de liefde gaat", which Holten co-wrote the song with Hans van Hemert. They ended up in 4th place.

In the November 9, 1974 issue of Billboard, it was announced that they were to break up. The reason given was that Holten wanted to pursue a career confined to songwriting while Reemer was to carry on as a solo singer. The magazine also said that she was to represent the Netherlands in the Eurovision Song Contest 1975. This did not materialize, as the group Teach-In represented Netherlands that year, but she instead represented Netherlands in 1976.

Their final single "Oh, Nous Sommes Tres Amoureux" bw "I Can't Forget" was released in 1975.

== Post Sandra and Andres ==
In 1975, Holten teamed up with Rosy Pereira as part of the duo Rosy & Andres and would have hits with "Sausalito, a tune that Holten had composed with Marshal Manengkei, and later with "My Love".
