= Wanda & Joyce =

- Origin: Netherlands
- Genres: Pop music
- Years active: 1962 - 1964
- Label: Fontana
- Past members: Wanda de Fretes, Joyce Aubrey, The Rhythm Brothers

Wanda & Joyce was a 1960s Netherlands based mother and daughter act made up of Wanda de Fretes and her mother Joyce Aubrey.

== Background ==
Joyce Aubrey was the ex-wife of steel guitarist George de Fretes and Wanda was their daughter. As an act they lasted from 1962 to 1964. They sang Hawaiian and krontjong songs. Originally from Indonesia, they were based in The Hague.".

Prior to teaming up with her daughter, Joyce Aubrey was a singer in the Mena Moeria Minstrels and the Amboina Serenaders. She also recorded as a solo artist with two singles on Fontana, "Heimwee naar Soerabaya" bw "Droomschilderij" in 1960, and "Carolina melodie" bw "Cowboy Jimmy Jo" in 1961. And Wanda de Frete's had released a version of "Let's twist again" on Decca.

Their first single "Ajoen Ajoen" bw "Koleh Koleh" was released on Fontana in September 1962. It did well for them. By November 1962, they had achieved a good level of popularity. Prior to that, Fontana has already released an EP with the songs "Ajoen ajoen", "Patokaän", "Rasa sajang keneh" and - "Koleh koleh". Their last single was "Dayung-dayung" which came out in 1964.

In later years Wanda de Fretes moved to California.

During their time recording together, they released nine singles and three extended play records.

== Discography ==
7" vinyl recordings (singles)
Title	Label	catalogue #	Year
"Ajoen ajoen" / "Koleh koleh"	Fontana	TF 266 336	1962
"Patokaän" / "Rasa sajang keneh"	Fontana	TF 266 337	1962
"Oléh-oléh Bandung" / "Rasa sajang"	Fontana	TF 266 338	1963
"Mari njong beramai-ramai" / "Potong padi"	Fontana	TF 266 339	1963
"Es gibt ein Wunderland" / "Ajun, ajun"	Fontana	TF 266 394	1963
"Hula serenade" / "Ik ken een sprookjesland"	Fontana	TF 266 403	1963
Zwei braune Hawaiianos / Loahé	Fontana	TF 266 420	1963
"Tari paying" / "Tari piring kaparinyo"	Fontana	TF 266 452	1964
"Dayung-dayung" / "Timang si buyung"	Fontana	TF 266 453	1964

7" vinyl recordings (extended play)
Title of EP	Title	Label	catalogue #	Year
Wanda And Joyce Vol. 1 with the Rhythm Brothers	"Ajoen ajoen", "Patokaän" / "Rasa sajang keneh", "Koleh koleh"	Fontana	TE 463 269	1962
Wanda And Joyce Vol. 2 with the Rhythm Brothers	"Oléh-oléh Bandung", "Mari njong beramai-ramai" / "Rasa sajang", "Potong"	Fontana	TE 463 270	1963
Tari Piring Kaparinyo	Tari piring kaparinyo - Tari payung / Timang si buyung - Dayung-dayung	Fontana	TE 463 297	1963

Various artists compilation albums
Title album	Title	Label	catalogue #	Year	Format
Pasar Malam	"Oléh-Oléh Bandung" "Dajung-Dajung"	Fontana	626 344 QL	1967	vinyl LP
Vinyl Raritäten 29	"Ajun, Ajun" "Es gibt ein Wunderland"		0509/2004-1	2004	compact disk
The Story of Indo Rock, Vol. 8	"Mari Njong Beramè Ramè"	Sam Sam Music	SSM 301193	2013	compact disk
The Story of Indo Rock, Vol. 10	"Waktu Potong Padi"	Sam Sam Music	SSM 301195	2013	compact disk
