= Rosy Pereira =

Indonesian-Dutch pop singer (born 1951)

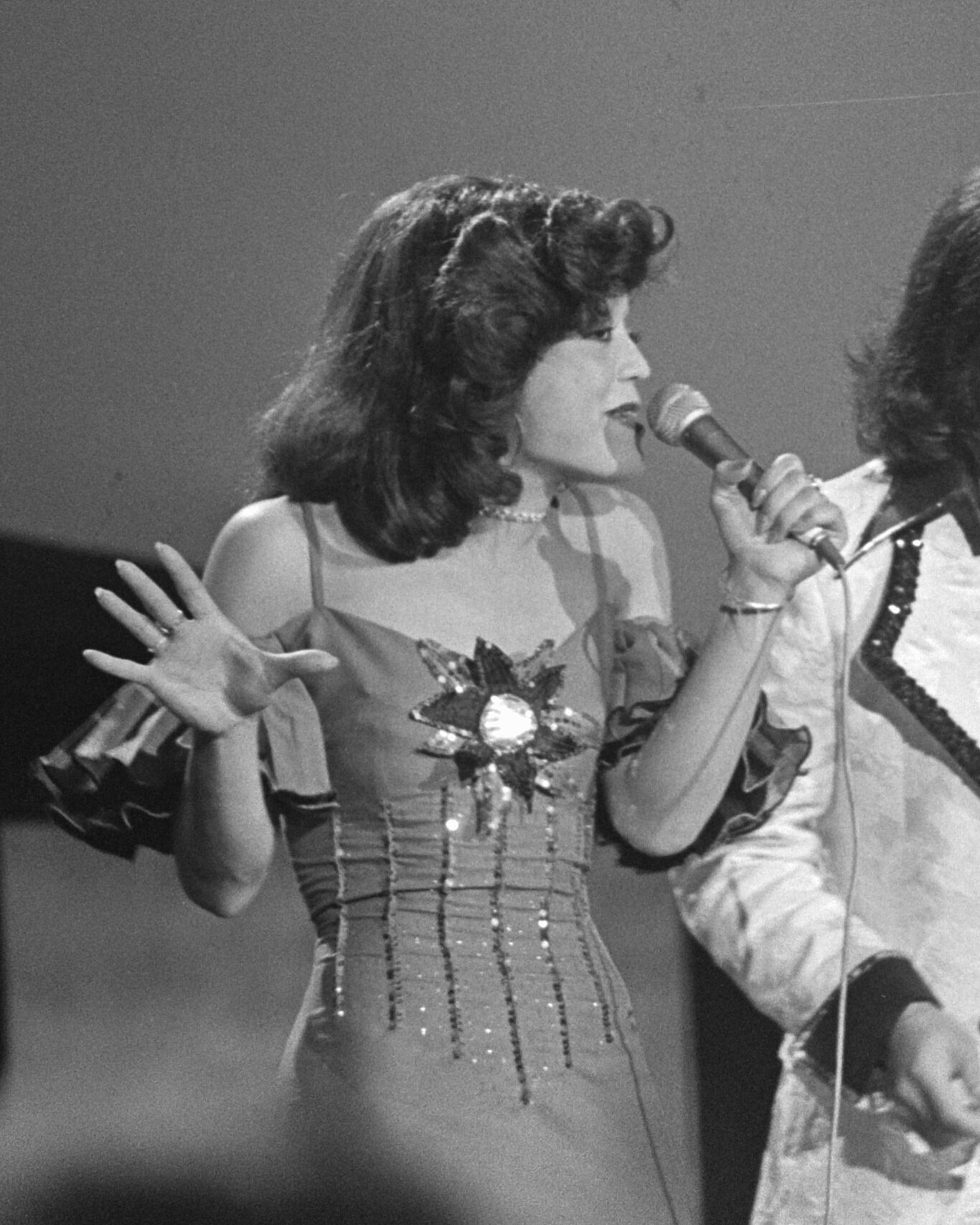
- Pereira in 1976

Background information
- Also known as: Baby May, Babe Pereira
- Born: Hedy Sylvia Pereira; 23 August 1951 (age 75); Jakarta, Indonesia
- Genres: Pop music, Soul music, Disco music
- Occupation: Musician
- Years active: 1960s - present
- Formerly of: Bonnie, Debbie & Rosy, Objection, Coy Pereira, Rosy & Andres, Rosy & Jay, The Thunderbolts,

Rosy Pereira (born 1951, in Jakarta) is an Indonesian-Dutch pop singer. She is the daughter of steel guitarist Coy Pereira. She released singles in the 1960s under her name as well as Babe Pereira. In the mid to late 1970s she was the other half of the duo Rosy & Andres who had a hit with "My Love".

== Background ==
Rosy Pereira is the youngest of three children and comes from a musical family. Her father Coy Pereira was a well known steel guitarist. He was a member of The Kilima Hawaiians, and had recorded with the Mena Moeria Minstrels. Her brother Richard was the lead guitarist in a band called The Thunderbolts. She has two children, born in 1982 and 1983.

== Career ==
Pereira's family arrived in February 1960 in the Netherlands, when Rosy was 8 years old. In 1965 she and her brother Richard formed a group called Objection. Later she sang with the Bobby Setter band. When she was eighteen years old while in Paris, she recorded her first single "Serenade To Summertime" which was produced by José Bartell and Jean-Claude Petit. This was recorded under the name of Babe Pereira. The B side of the single, "Can't You See" is of interest to Freakbeat and Northern Soul collectors. It also appears on the various artists compilation, Waiting For A Break In the Clouds 16 rare gems of soulful pop-sike and groovy psych 1968 - 1973.

She would record two more singles as Babe Pereira, one in 1969 "Someone, Somewhere" bw "Paperboy" and "If You Believe In Love" bw "Try" in 1971.

In 1972, she appeared in the film De laatse dagen van Isaak aka The Last Good Days of Isaac that starred Charles Cornette, Hilde Uitterlinden and Rik van Uffelen.

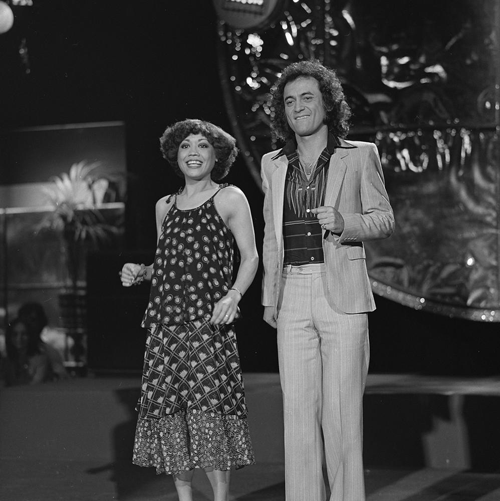
Pereira and Dries Holten (1975)

In the mid-1970s she was in a duo with Andres Holten. They had a top ten hit in 1976 with "My Love" which reached no.3 on the Billboard Dutch chart.

In 1979, she was part of a trio called Bonnie, Debbie & Rosy who released a single called "Oh Boy" which was written and produced by Peter Koelewijn. In addition to herself, the trio included Bonnie St. Claire and Debbie aka Ria Schildmeyer.

In 1985, the single "Darling" bw " I Feel Like Dancing" was released. In 1994, she recorded a single with Jay Uitterlinden which was released under Rosy & Jay.

== Discography ==
=== Singles ===
Solo
As Babe Pereira

- "Serenade To Summertime" / "Can't You See" - Triangle BE 61310 - (1969)
- "Someone, Somewhere" / "Paperboy" - Someone, somewhere / Paperboy - (1969)
- "If You Believe In Love" / "Try" - Basart 239 - (1971)

As Rosy Pereira / Rosy

- "It's Okay For Me" / "First Time In Love" - CNR 141 716 - (1981)
- "Darling" / "I Feel Like Dancing" - Dureco 5039 - (1985)

Bonnie, Debbie & Rosy

- "Oh Boy" / "Oh Boy" (inst) - Philips 6012 868 - (1979)

=== Participation ===
- Various artists - Waiting For A Break In the Clouds 16 rare gems of soulful pop-sike and groovy psych 1968 - 1973
  Shady Daze Records – SDR 112 - (2010) Track: "Can't You See"
