= Tony Servi =

Belgian pop singer

- Also known as: Toni Servi, Tony
- Born: Antoine Thérèse Serverius; 23 January 1959 (age 67); Leuven, Vlaams-Brabant, Belgium
- Occupation: singer
- Years active: 1990s - present
- Website: http://www.tony-servi.be

Tony Servi is a pop singer from Belgium who has been recording and performing from the early 1980s until the present. He also has had several hits in his own country.

== Background ==
In 1993, he had a hit with "Free Like A Bird" which peaked at no. 21 in Belgium. He would have a total of six chart hits before striking it again as part of a duo in late 1993. In 1993, he had a hit with Corina as part of the duo Tony Servi & Corina. They recorded "My Love" which originally was a hit for Netherlands based duo Rosy & Andres in 1976. It stayed in the Flemish Top Ten for 10 weeks, peaking at no. 3. In Belgium's national charts it peaked at no. 34. In April of the following year, they had a hit with their song "Mijn Avontuur" which stayed in the Flemish Top 10 for 7 weeks, peaking at no.8.

In mid 2006, after being quiet on the music scene for a period of time, Servi recorded "De oude muzikant" which was a Dutch Eurovision classic from some time back, originally done by Ben Cramer. In June 2012, he was one of the artists to appear at the Schlagerfestival.

== Discography ==
=== Singles ===
As Tony

- "Free Like A Bird" / "Little Lonely One" - Rainbow R. 588 - (1988)
- "Alone" / "Free Like A Bird" (Instr.) - Rainbow R. 611 - (1988)
- "Song Of Love" / "Morning Sky" - Rainbow R. 627 - (1988)

As Tony Servi

- "Pro Belgium" (Nederlands) / "Pro Belgium" (Frans) - Gnome Records TSI 4419 - (1985)
- "Waarom" / "Eiland Voor Dromen" - Telstar Tsi-4457 - (1986)
- "Jouw Warme Land" / "Heerlijk Dansen" - Gnome Records TSI 4411 - (1986)
- "Ginny, I Love You" / "Ritme Van De Wereld" - Telstar TSI 4649 - (1988)
- "Volg De Stem Van Je Hart" / "Droom Weg Van Je Zorgen" - Telstar TSI 4711 - (1989)
- "Vrij" / "Vaarwel" - Telstar TSI 4668 - (1989)
- "Als Vriendschap Liefde Wordt" / "Niet Met Mij" - Telstar TSI 4690 - (1989)
- "Verdomme" / "Mens In Nood" - Telstar TSI 4755 - (1990)
