= Dries Holten =

Dutch singer and songwriter (1936–2020)

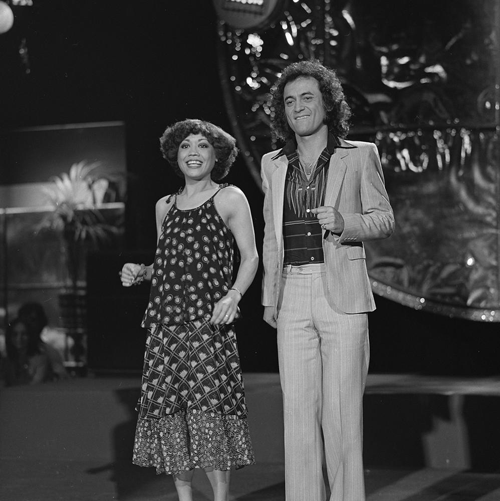
- Holten with Rosy Pereira in 1977
- Born: 30 January 1936; Cimahi, West Java, Indonesia
- Died: 15 April 2020 (aged 84)
- Occupations: singer songwriter

Notes
- Related acts Rosy & Andres, Rosy Pereira, Sandra & Andres, Sandra Reemer, Ria Shield Meyer

Andres "Dries" Holten (30 January 1936 – 15 April 2020) was a Dutch singer and songwriter of Indo descent. He represented the Netherlands at the 1972 Eurovision Song Contest alongside Sandra Reemer. After he and Reemer broke up, Holten formed a new group with Rosy Pereira and called it Rosy & Andres. In 1980, Holten's final group was of him and Ria Shield Meyer.

== Career ==
=== Sandra and Andres ===
In 1972 at Eurovision, along with fellow Dutch-Indonesian singer Sandra Reemer he represented the Netherlands with their song "Als het om de liefde gaat", the meaning in English is when love is concerned. He co-wrote the song with Hans van Hemert.

=== Rosy and Andres ===
In 1975, now having teamed up with another Indonesian singer, Rosy Pereira the daughter of steel guitarist Coy Pereira, they released the single "Sausilito". Holten co-wrote it with Marshal Manengkei. In the Netherlands it peaked at number 7 and spent four weeks on the charts. The following year, it was reported in the 9 October 1976 issue of Billboard that their single "My Love" reached position number 3 in the Dutch chart, just behind "In Zaire" by Johnny Wakelin and with "Dancing Queen" by ABBA at no 1.
