= Marshal Manengkei =

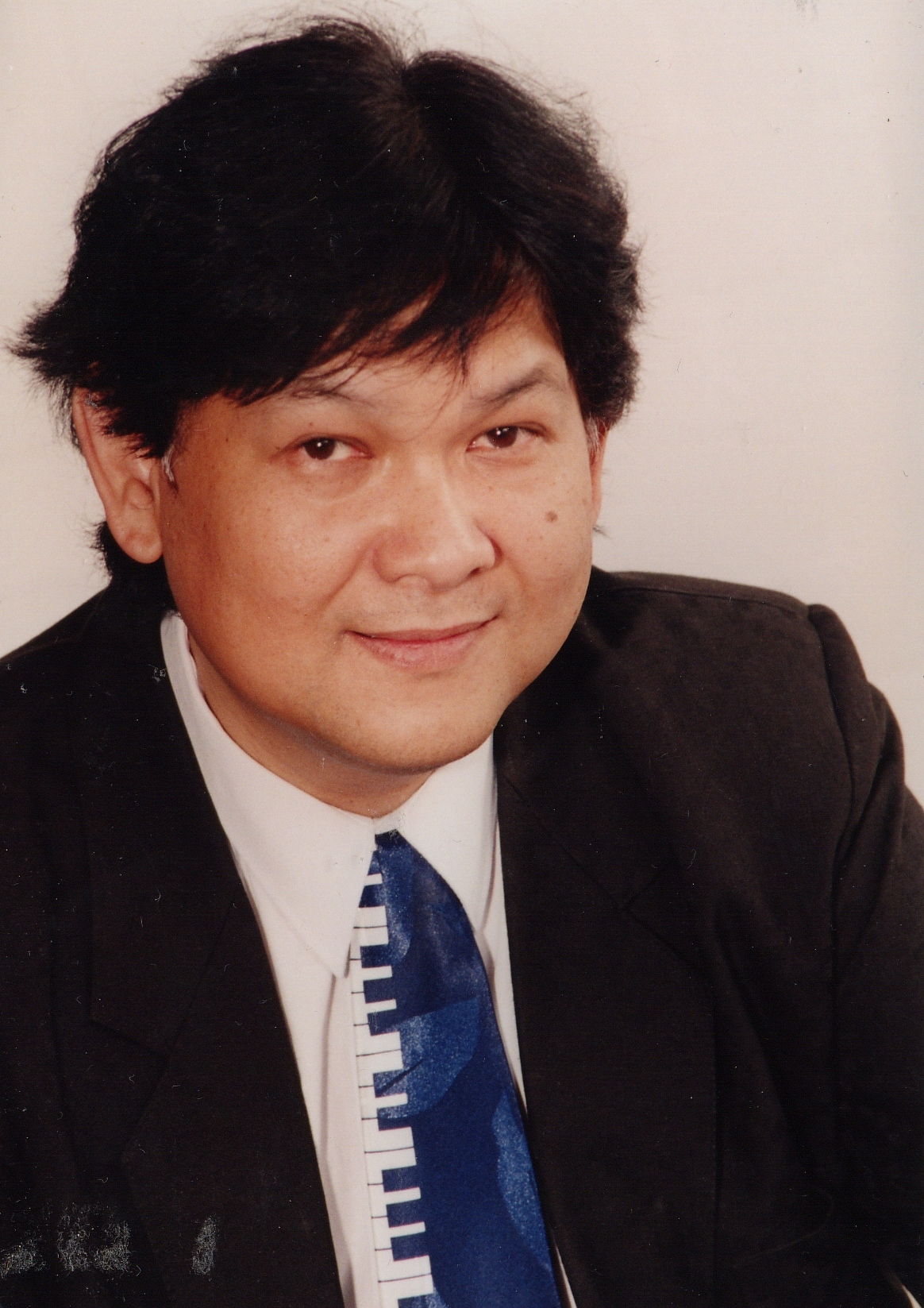

Background information
- Birth name: Marshal Conradt Jules Manengkei
- Born: March 9, 1949; Surabaya, Indonesia
- Died: August 25, 2017 (aged 68); Jakarta, Indonesia
- Genres: Pop, Soul, Disco
- Occupation(s): Songwriter, producer
- Years active: 1970s

Marshal Manengkei (9 March 1949 – 25 August 2017) was a Dutch-Indonesian producer, songwriter, composer and lyricist. He was also an occasional singer. He had been a co-composer on a number of Dutch and European hit singles during the 1970s.

== Background ==
=== Early years ===
He was born on March 9, 1949, In Surabaya, Indonesia. Due to the political upheaval in Indonesia during the 1960s, his family left their country for Europe in 1965. Some nine months after their arrival, his father suffered a stroke and young Marshal had to help out by finding extra paid work.

=== Career ===
Some of the hit songs he has co-composed with Andres Holten include "Sausalito" and "My Love" for Rosy & Andres. He also composed Oscar Harris's hit "Song For The Children", and Debbie's "Angelino". As a producer, he has produced for the Blue Diamonds,

== Discography ==
- Stoney's Aphrodite – "Down At Rockszana's" / "Reaching Out" - Sky SKY 4159 SS - (1984)
