= Debbie (singer) =

Dutch singer

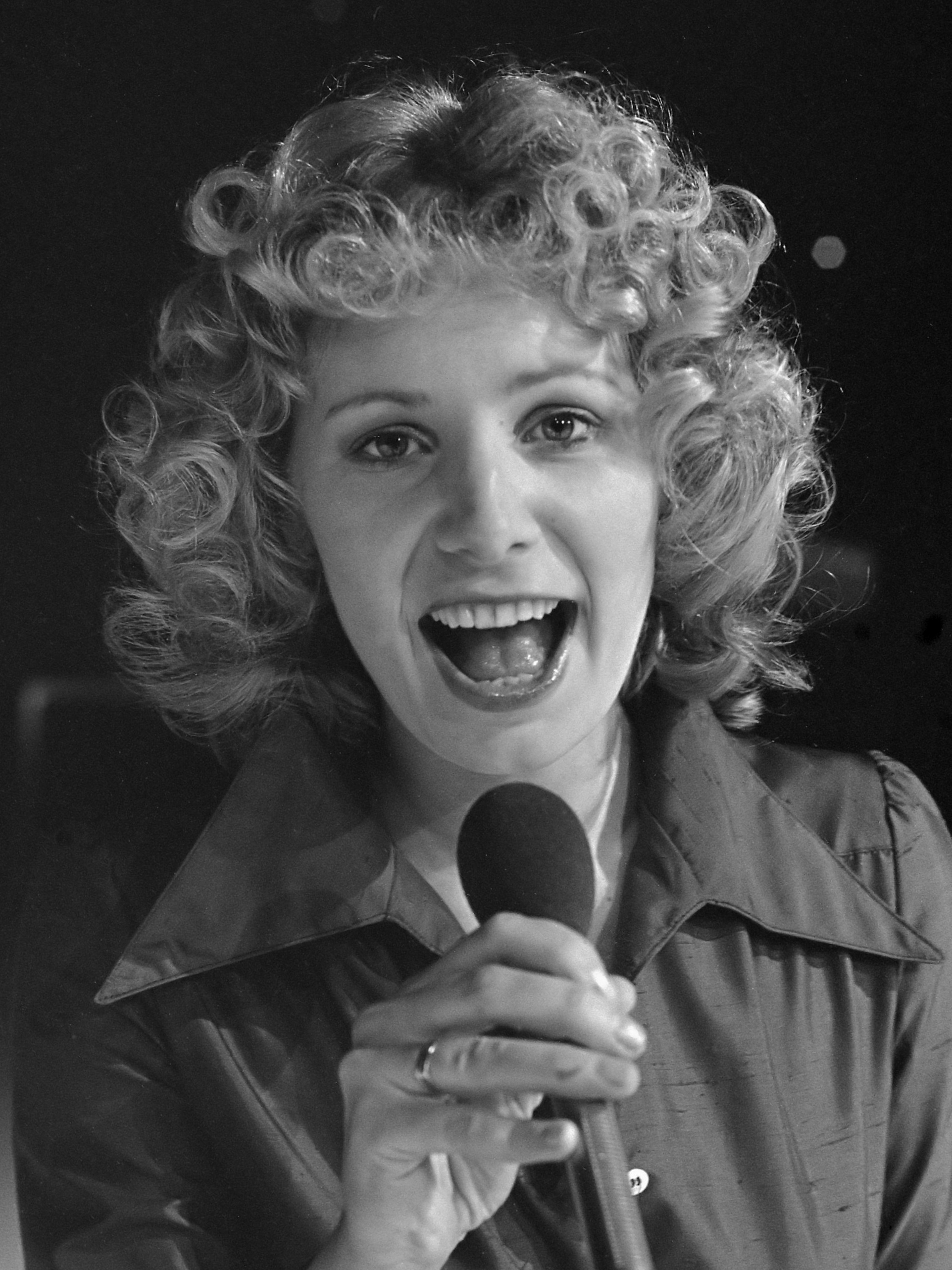
- Debbie in 1975
- Born: 20 July 1954 (age 71); The Netherlands
- Occupation: Singer
- Years active: 1967–
- Notable work: Everybody Join Hands'; It Takes Two; Everybody Loves Somebody

Debbie, pseudonym of Ria Schildmeyer (born in Haarlem, on 20 July 1954) is a Dutch singer. She was also part of a trio called Bonnie, Debbie & Rosy.

Debbie's debut as a singer was in 1967 as a singer in the group Ghizlane. Her first single "Flower Power Rock" was released by Gert Timmerman's record label Carpenter. Debbie started her solo career in 1972 and made several hits including "Everybody Join Hands" (a Giorgio Moroder composition), "Angelino" and "I Love You More And More".

The record company Ariola had major international plans for Debbie. For example, her album "Debbie in Olympic" was not recorded in the Netherlands but in London's Olympic Sound Studios by record producer Rodger Watson.

In 1977, she came in contact with Dries Holten of the duo Sandra & Andres. He wrote a number of tracks with Marshal Manengkei for her including "Angelino". In Germany, "Geh vorbei" was released as a single. In 1978, she had a small hit with a cover version of the Drifters song Save the Last Dance for Me. In 1981 Debbie won the first prize at the large international competition 'Golden Orpheus' in Bulgaria.

She worked together with Oscar Harris in the period between 1981 and 1983. In 1984 Debbie's "Souvenirs Del Sol" was ranked number 33 in the Nationale Hitparade. She also published a new version of "Everybody Join Hands" that year. The record resided at the lowest levels of the charts. In August 1988 she released her last single "Lazy Days", produced with Dries Holten as guest musician. The record went no higher than number 46.

Debbie released three albums: "Everybody Join Hands" (1972), "It Takes Two" (1982, with Oscar Harris) and "Everybody Loves Somebody" (1983).
