= Luluk Purwanto =

Indonesian jazz violinist

- Born: 25 June 1959; Surakarta, Indonesia
- Website: luluk.com

Luluk Purwanto or Purwanto (born 25 June 1959) is an Indonesian jazz violinist who extends the violin's sound with her voice. She has recorded since the 1980s. She has lived in the Netherlands and in Germany.

== Life ==
Purwanto was born in the Indonesian city of Surakarta in 1959. Her parents were Aysha Gani and Julian Purwanto who were both musicians. She took lessons in classical violin. She has studied at the Arts Institute in Yogyakarta in Java and thanks to a scholarship from the Australia Embassy, at the Sydney Conservatorium of Music. She also studied at the Institut Kesenian Jakarta.

She is married to a Dutchman named Rene van Helsdingen and they lived and worked together in the Netherlands. The trio that she played with was called the Helsdingen Trio

In 1985 she appeared at the North Sea Jazz Festival in The Hague in 1985 as a member of the Indonesian band Bhaskara.

Luluk and Bhaskara are credited for composing the iconic theme tune for RCTI's flagship newscast, Seputar Indonesia in 1989, which is Indonesia's first newscast ever carried by a commercial television station. The track, which is titled "Betawi" or "Jakarta", became Seputar Indonesia's opening and closing theme for fourteen years (1989–2003).

She has lived in Munich in Germany.

In 2006 Purwanto awarded the prize the New Generation Jazz Award for the best young jazz musician at JakArt@2006 to Quicky.

== Selected discography ==
- Luluk – Aysha (Luluk Purwanto & the Helsdingen trio), 2007
- "Impression of a tour"/ Mahabharata Jazz and Wayang, 2004
- Luluk – Brushes the CD & the Clip, 2003
- Luluk -Born Free-,
- FILM2000, 2000
- LuLuK PuRwAntO & ThE HeLsdinGeN TriO – The Stage Bus, 1994
- Impressions of Indonesia, 1986
