= Tony Servi & Corina =

Belgian singing duo

- Origin: Belgium
- Genres: Pop music
- Years active: 1990s - present
- Labels: J.R.P Records
- Past members: Tony Servi, Corina

Tony Servi & Corina are a singing duo from Belgium that consists of Tony Servi and Corina Braemt. They had two hits in the 1990s with My Love and "Mijn Avontuur" (My Adventure).

== Background ==
In 1993, they covered "My Love" which originally was a hit for Netherlands based duo Rosy & Andres in 1976. It stayed in the Flemish Top Ten for 10 weeks, peaking at no. 3. In Belgium's national charts it peaked at no. 34. In April 1994, their song "Mijn Avontuur" stayed in the Flemish Top 10 for 7 weeks, peaking at no.8.

They were initially brought together by Jack Rivers and signed to his label. Prior to their first hit, Tony Servi aka Antoine Serverius had six hits in his country. Corina aka Corina Braemt, had provided backing vocals for Sam Gooris's 1992 single "Kom M'n Liefste Meisje" single as well as providing backing vocals for Servi's Hemel Help Mij album. She later recorded under the name of Laurena and her own name, has worked as a backing vocalist with various artists later sang the theme song for 1999 film, The Debtors that starred Michael Caine.

Their two hits appear on the 27 Vlaamse TV-hits Vol. 1 compilation issued in 1995.

== Recent years ==
Around 2010, the two were back together and some time later recorded "Mexicaanse Nachten", which was produced by Peter Keereman.

In 2014, Corina recorded a single, "Brandend Verlangen", and in 2015 she recorded " Ik Laat Je Niet Gaan".

== Discography ==
=== CD singles ===
- "My Love", "Terug Naar Vlaanderen" - J.R.P. 931022 - (1993)
- "Het Avontuur" / "Nooit Meer Voorbij" - J.R.P. – 941001 - (1994)

=== Other media ===
- "Mexicaanse Nachten" - PK -(2011) (digital single)
