= Corina (Belgian singer) =

- Also known as: Laurena
- Born: Corina Braemt
- Years active: 1990s - present

Corina is a singer from Belgium. She has recorded in the past under the name of Laurena. She was one half of the duo Tony Servi & Corina who had two hits in the 1990s with My Love and "Mijn Avontuur" (My Adventure).

== Background ==
Her real name is Corina Braemt and in the past she was known as Laurena. In the 1990s she was one half of the duo Tony Servi & Corina who in 1993 had a hit with "My Love" which some years seventeen years earlier was a hit for Netherlands based duo Rosy & Andres. It stayed in the Flemish Top Ten for 10 weeks, peaking at no. 3. In Belgium's national charts it peaked at no. 34. In April 1994, their song "Mijn Avontuur" stayed in the Flemish Top 10 for 7 weeks, peaking at no.8. Between 2012 and 2015 she has had five minor chart hits with the latest being " Ik laat je niet gaan" in 2015.

== Recent activity ==
Along with Wendy 't Joos, she has been singing with the Golden Bis Band.

== Corina discography (selective) ==
=== CD singles ===
- "Met Jou", "Met Jou" (Instrumentaal) - Columbia COL 660985-1, Columbia 660985 1

=== Digital singles ===
- "Engel van mijn dromen" - PK 100000022 - (2012)

=== Various artist compilation ===
- De Vlaamse Top 10 van 3 juni 2012 VBRO Radio -
- Ik luister Nederlandstalig volume 1 - CNR 22 23936-2 - (2012) - Song: "Engel van mijn dromen"

== Laurena discography (selective) ==
=== CD singles ===
- "Vleugels", "Vleugels" (Instrumentale Versie) - Polydor 573 630-2 - (1997)
- "Ik Laat Me Gaan", "Kom Toch Terug" - Polydor 571 930-2, JDM Records – 571 930-2 - (1997)
- "All Your Love" (Radio Edit), "All Your Love" (Original Edit) - EMI 7243 8 85659 2 9 - (1998)
- "Coming Around Again" (Jam Radio Mix), "Coming Around Again" (Original Radio Mix) - Antler-Subway AS 5753 CDS, Antler-Subway 7243 8 86410 2 9 - (1998)

=== 12" singles ===
- "All Your Love" (Club Mix), "All Your Love" (Jelly Mix) / "All Your Love" (Junkie Joy Party Mix), " All Your Love" (Original Version), "All Your Love" (Night Mix) - Antler-Subway AS 5710 - (1998)

=== Various artist compilation ===
- DJ Visage – Mixmania Vol. 2 - Antler-Subway AS 5715, Antler-Subway 7243 4 95392 2 8
