= Bonnie St. Claire =

Dutch singer and actress (born 1949)

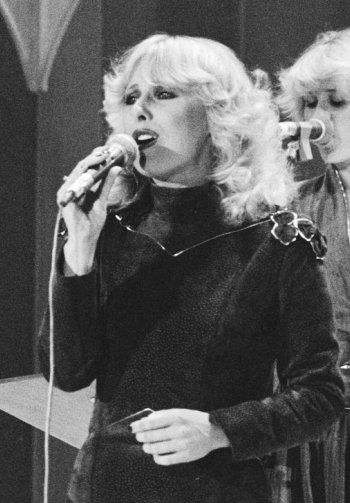
- St. Claire performing in Nationaal Songfestival 1982

Background information
- Also known as: Bonny St. Claire
- Born: Bonje Cornelia Swart; 18 November 1949 (age 76); Rozenburg, Netherlands
- Genres: Pop, rock
- Occupations: Singer, actress
- Years active: 1966–present
- Labels: Philips, Columbia, Mercury, RCA

Bonnie St. Claire (born Bonje Cornelia Swart, 18 November 1949) is a Dutch singer and actress who has a recording history that began in the 1960s and continued into the 1990s. She was part of the trio Bonnie, Debbie & Rosy, and part of the duo Bonnie & José with José Hoebee.

== Life and career ==
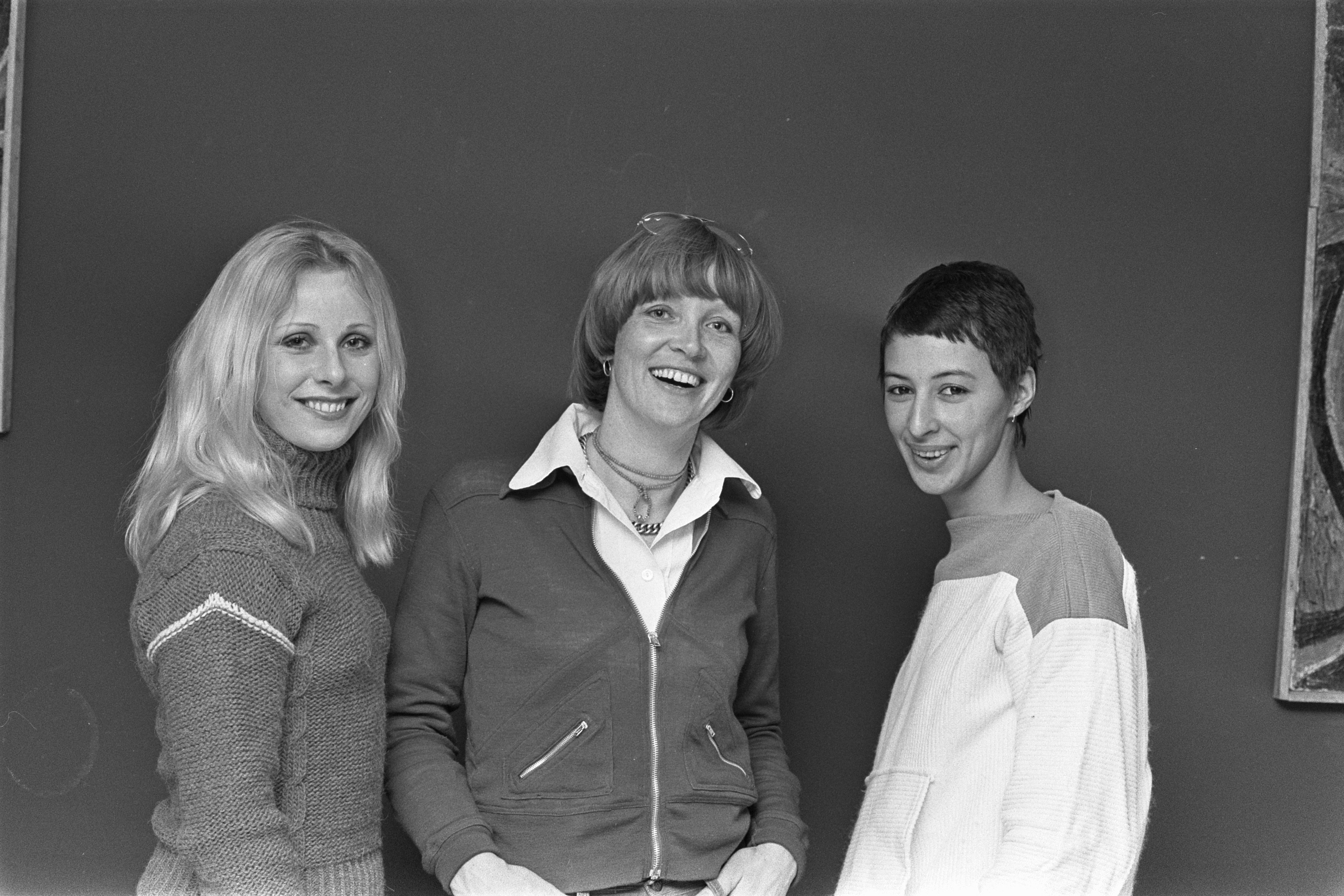
St. Claire with Ati Dijckmeester and Heddy Lester at the 1977 Nationaal Songfestival

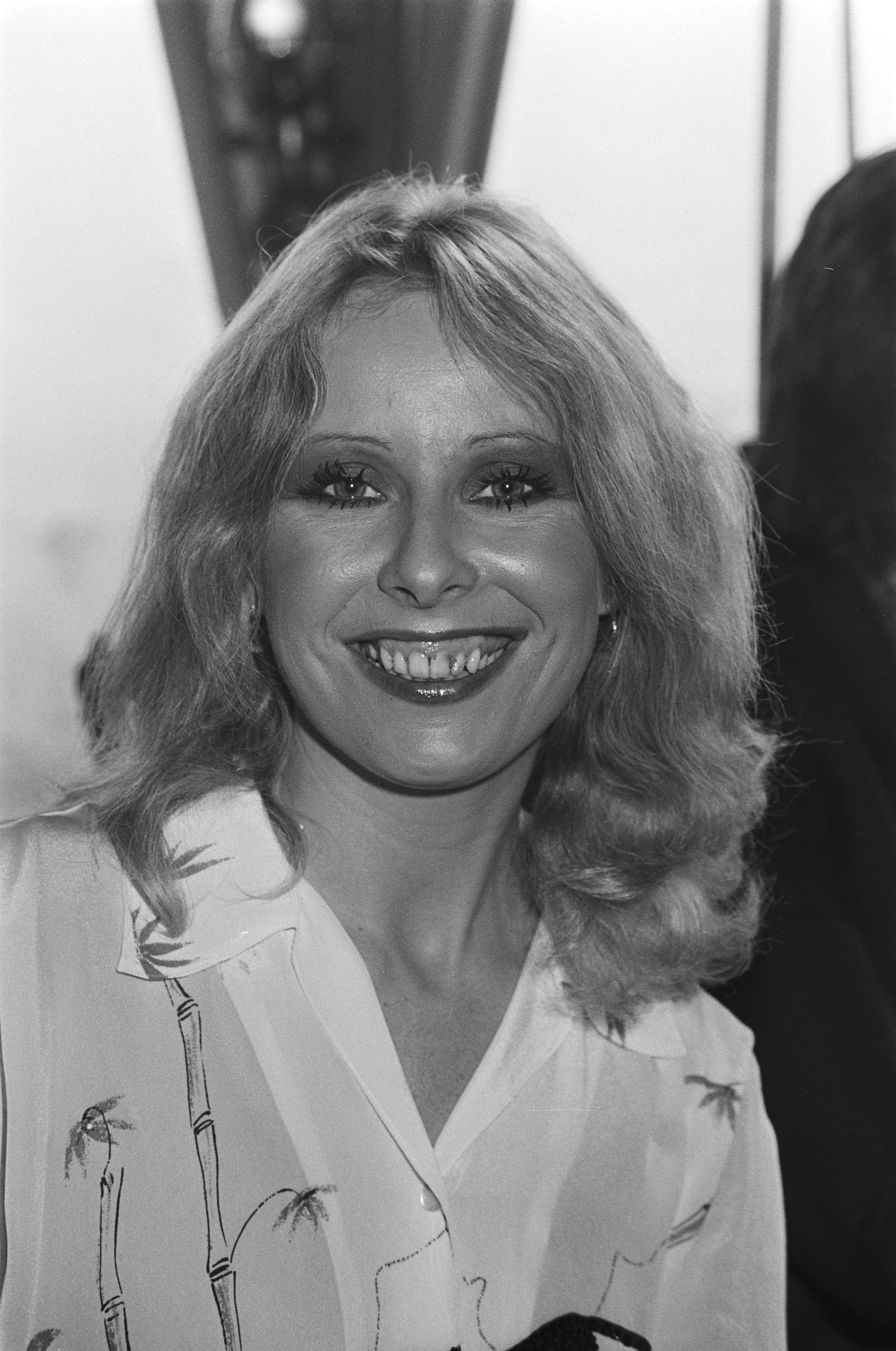
St. Claire in 1981

St. Claire was born as Bonje Cornelia Swart in Rozenburg on 18 November 1949. She was born on a boat and is the daughter of a barge skipper. Her career began in 1966 when at a Peter Koelewijn concert, she was invited to come up on stage and sing with him.

In 1970 she had a hit with "I Won't Stand Between Them", which peaked at no. 6 in the Netherlands and spent eleven weeks in the charts. In 1979, she was part of a trio called Bonnie, Debbie & Rosy who released a single called "Oh Boy", which was written and produced by Peter Koelewijn. In addition to herself, the trio included Debbie, aka Ria Schildmeyer, and Rosy Pereira. She had a string of hits in the Netherlands, including Dokter Bernhard (1976), Pierrot (1980), Bonnie kom je buiten spelen (1980) and Vlieg nooit te hoog (1981). She also scored a hit with a translation of the Bette Midler song The Rose, which translates as De Roos (1980). Later St. Claire would join José Hoebee as part of the duo Bonnie & José and would have a degree of success in the Netherlands. The two singers were under the same management and they soon became friends and started socializing with each other. In 1984 they enjoyed a Top 40 hit with "Cassandra", which had previously been recorded by ABBA. They also recorded an album of Abba songs, which was approved by Björn Ulvaeus.

In 2010, St. Claire and Gerard Joling had a hit in the Netherlands with "Morgen Wordt Alles Anders" as Bonnie & Gerard. The song peaked at no. 2 and spent nine weeks in the charts.

== Discography ==
=== Singles ===
Original Title	Meaning in English	Year	Date of entry (date-month-year)	Peak	Weeks	Notes
"Tame Me Tiger"	—	1967	25-11-1967	tip	—	as Bonny St. Claire with The Jets
"Tame Me Tiger"	—	1967	30-12-1967	tip	—	as Bonny St. Claire with The Jets
"Let Me Come Back Home, Mama"	—	1969	17-05-1969	24	6	as Bonny St. Claire; #29 in the Hilversum 3 Top 30
"I Won't Stand Between Them"	—	1970	05-09-1970	5	14	#6 in the Hilversum 3 Top 30
"Mañana Mañana"	—	1972	29-04-1972	11	8	#8 in the Daverende 30
"Clap your hands and stamp your feet"	—	1972	16-12-1972	3	12	with Unit Gloria; #3 in the Daverende 30
"Waikiki Man"	—	1973	19-05-1973	4	9	with Unit Gloria; #5 in the Daverende Dertig; Alarmschijf
Voulez-vous (Yes I Do, I Love You)"	—	1974	30-03-1974	21	6	with Unit Gloria; #23 in the Daverende 30
"Rocco (Don't Go) (Live)"	—	1975	04-10-1975	28	5	with Unit Gloria and Peter Koelewijn
"Een heel gelukkig kerstfeest"	"A Very Happy Christmas"	1975	27-12-1975	10	3	with various artists; #12 in the Nationale Hitparade
"Rocky"	—	1976	22-05-1976	1	11	with Don Mercedes; #1 in the Nationale Hitparade
"Dokter Bernhard"	"Doctor Bernhard"	1976	10-07-1976	7	8	with Ron Brandsteder; #6 in the Nationale Hitparade
"Ik ben gelukkig zonder jou"	"I Am Happy Without You"	1976	25-12-1976	6	9	#19 in the Nationale Hitparade
"Stop Me"	—	1977	19-02-1977	tip	—	
"(Don't Let Them) Stop the Music"	—	1978	—	—	—	Not a hit
"Het grote sprookjeslied"	"The Great Fairytale Song"	1979	26-01-1980	24	5	with various artists; #16 in the Nationale Hitparade
"Pierrot"	—	1980	24-05-1980	5	11	#8 in the Nationale Hitparade
"Bonnie kom je buiten spelen"	"Bonnie, Are You Coming Out to Play"	1980	25-10-1980	19	8	#13 in the Nationale Hitparade
"De roos (The Rose)"	"The Rose"	1980	03-01-1981	26	5	#23 in the Nationale Hitparade
"Merlijn"	"Merlin"	1981	30-05-1981	33	3	#18 in the Nationale Hitparade
"Vlieg nooit te hoog"	"Never Fly Too High"	1981	10-10-1981	34	4	#16 in the Nationale Hitparade
"Een kind een kind"	"A Child, a Child"	1982	10-04-1982	tip	—	with various artists
"Vreemdeling"	"Stranger"	1982	15-05-1982	tip	—	#36 in the Nationale Hitparade
"I Won't Stand Between Them"	—	1982	18-12-1982	tip	—	
"Verder valt 't wel mee (Avec simplicité)"	"Otherwise It's Not That Bad"	1983	19-03-1983	tip	—	with Benny Neyman
"Sla je arm om me heen"	"Put Your Arm Around Me"	1983	30-07-1983	13	7	#11 in the Nationale Hitparade
"Kwart voor één (The Child in Me)"	"Quarter to One"	1983	17-12-1983	tip18	—	#45 in the Nationale Hitparade
Cassandra"	—	1984	07-07-1984	24	5	as Bonnie & José; #19 in the Nationale Hitparade
"Zoals vrienden doen (The Way Old Friends Do)"	"As Friends Do"	1985	30-08-1985	36	4	as Bonnie & José; #18 in the Nationale Hitparade
"Doe alles nog een keer over"	"Do It All Over Again"	1985	05-10-1985	tip15	—	Dutch version of "Kiss You All Over"
"Waarom (Move On)"	"Why"	1985	21-12-1985	—	—	as Bonnie & José; #35 in the Nationale Hitparade
"Het lijkt of ik droom"	"It Seems Like I'm Dreaming"	1988	14-05-1988	—	—	Dutch version of "I Close My Eyes and Count to Ten"
"Happy Xmas / Gelukkig kerstfeest"	"Happy Christmas"	1988	10-12-1988	35	3	with various artists
"Morgen wordt alles anders"	"Tomorrow Everything Will Be Different"	1991	29-06-1991	17	8	#12 in the Nationale Top 100
"Zeven jaren"	"Seven Years"	1991	07-09-1991	32	3	#21 in the Nationale Top 100
"Douwe"	—	1992	01-02-1992	—	—	#63 in the Nationale Top 100
"'n Engel als jij"	"An Angel Like You"	1995	25-02-1995	tip21	—	as Bonnie & José
"Haven/Masker af"	"Harbour / Mask Off"	1997	—	—	—	
"Geef ons nog een keer een kans"	"Give Us One More Chance"	2008	—	—	—	
"Morgen wordt alles anders (Live)"	"Tomorrow Everything Will Be Different"	2010	03-08-2010	—	—	with Gerard Joling
"Anders"	"Different"	2011	10-2011	—	—	with David Vandyck
