= Rudi Wairata =

- Also known as: Rudy Wairata, Sam Letto, Roy Moana
- Born: Diederich Gijsbrecht Christo Wairata; 25 December 1929 (1930?); Ternate, Dutch East Indies
- Died: 15 July 1981 (aged 51) Rotterdam, Netherlands
- Genres: Hawaiian music
- Occupation: Music
- Instrument: Steel guitar
- Formerly of: Amboina Serenaders, Ke Aloha Hawaiian Strings, The Kilima Hawaiians, Mena Moeria Minstrels, Das Moana Quartett, The New Polynesians, Rudi Wairata & The Hawaiian Boys, Rudi Wairata & The Hawaiian Minstrels, Rudi Wairata & The Serenaders, Suara Nusantara (aka The Nusantara Serenaders)

Rudi Wairata aka Rudy Wairata(1929/1930 –1981) was an influential Indonesian musician who had fronted the Mena Moeria Minstrels and the Amboina Serenaders. Wairata's style of playing was influenced by Sol Hoʻopiʻi and Andy Iona. Along with George de Fretes he was a prominent musician in the genre of Hawaiian steel guitar music. His song "Rock'n Roll Breezes" may be the first Indo-rock song.

== Background ==
Wairati was born on Ternate, North Moluccas, Dutch East Indies, as 'Diederich Gijsbrecht Christo Wairati, son of Andries Egbert Wairata and Antoinetta Cornelia Meulenaar, on 25 December 1929 (or 1930 or 1932). He learned to play steel guitar by listening to Sol Ho'opi'i and Andy Iona records. His family moved to Yogyakarta, Java, when he was 11 years of age. There he worked to improve his steel guitar skills while studying, amongst others from George de Fretes. In 1949, his vocal group, a quartet called the Raindrops, along with the Jos Cleber Orchestra were broadcast on Radio Batavia. In 1950, he obtained a music scholarship for the Royal Conservatory of The Hague and went to the Netherlands.

In 1951, Wairata founded the group the Mena Moeria Minstrels in The Hague. This group featured Joyce Aubrey and Ming Luhulima. Having been successful with the Mena Moeria Minstrels, he started the Amboina Serenaders. This group had the same lineup as his previous group, with the addition of a vibraphone-player. In 1957, RCA released "Rock and Roll and Breezes" backed with "Mahalani Papado," credited to Rudi Wairata & His Hawaiian Minstrels. In 1958 Wairata joined the Kilima Hawaiians group. They recorded "Whistling Guitar," which featured Wairata making bird sound effects with his steel guitar. Wairata's Ambonese background was an influence on the sound of the band. The Kilima Hawaiians toured American service bases, after which Wairata remained in Germany. He was replaced by Coy Pereira.

He worked in Germany for 13 or 14 years, during which he performed as a solo artist and sometimes with his wife. From 1961 to 1963, he recorded with Das Moana Quartett, a group that featured Ron Wattimena, also known as Ronnie Watti, who in the 1970s would record under the name of Peter Waaldrecht. He also played with the Roberto Delgado orchestra of German Bandleader & Composer Horst Wende for his first & second Blue Hawaii albums in 1965 & 1970. The group had a single and three EPs released in 1961 mostly for the Ariola label. Their last single was "Kaiwahu-Marsch," whose B-side was "On the beach of Waikiki," in 1963. During his time in Germany he recorded three albums.

He returned to the Netherlands in 1974, when he formed a recording group called The New Polynesians. Their debut album was issued on the Delta Records label.

In 1976, his album The Suara Nusantara was released on the EMI-Bovema label.

== Death ==
Rudi Wairata died in Rotterdam, the Netherlands in 1981.

== Rudi Wairata discography ==
Singles

- Rudy Wairata - "Tia Tato E Tamoure" / "Schöne Südsee Orchidee" - CNR F 388 - (1965)

Albums

- Rudi Wairata - Rudi Wairata presents with love from the Islands "The Suara Nusantara" - EMI-Bovema Holland – 5C 050-25415 - (1976)
- Rudi Wairata/Roy Moana - Good Old Hawaii - GIP GL 55.068, DURECO GL 55.068 - (1978)

== Rudi Wairata & His Mena Moeria Minstrels ==
- Rudi Wairata & His Mena Moeria Minstrels – Beautiful Hawaii - Dureco 51.002 - (1962)
  (Note: The cover says Rudi Wairata & His Mena Moeria Minstrels but label says Muing Luhulima un The Mena Moeria Minstrels)
- Rudi Wairata & His Mena Moeria Minstrels – Waikiki Welcome - Dureco 51.055 - (19??)
- Rudi Wairata & His Mena Moeria Minstrels – With Love From....Rudi Wairata & His Mena Moeria Minstrels - Capri – CA 32-G - (1972)
- Rudi Wairata & His Mena Moeria Minstrels – Love And Music From ... Hawaii - Capri CA 161 - (Circa 1974)
- Rudi Wairata & His Mena Moeria Minstrels – Lovely Hula Girl, Sweet Sweet Steel Guitar Series No. 3 - Maple MA-1003 - (1974)

=== Rudi Wairata & the Amboina Serenaders ===
Singles

- The Amboina Serenaders o.l.v. Rudi Wairata - "Hela Rotan" / "Goro Goro Né" - RCA 45 170 - (1955)
- Rudi Wairata & zijn Amboina Serenaders - "Panggajo E Panggajo" / "Sarinandé" - RCA 48 102 - (1955)
- Rudi Wairata & zijn Amboina Serenaders - "Ajo Mama" / "Kami Berlajar" - RCA 48 106 - (1955)
- Rudi Wairata & zijn Amboina Serenaders - "Bintang Malam" / "Toma Hasa" - RCA 48 112 - (1955)
- Rudi Wairata & zijn Amboina Serenaders - "Heimwee Naar Ambon" / "Meisjelief" - RCA 48 113 - (1955)
- Rudi Wairata & zijn Amboina Serenaders - "Soerabaja" / "Klappermelk Met Suiker" - RCA 48 117 - (1956)
- Rudi Wairata & zijn Amboina Serenaders - "E-tanasé" (Roeierslied) / "Waktoe Potong Pad" - CID 48 119 - (1956)
- Rudi Wairata & zijn Amboina Serenaders - "Binta Ingin Mau Poelang" / "Ramai Dendang" - RCA 48 123 - (1956)
- Rudi Wairata & zijn Amboina Serenaders - "Bali Bali Boogie" / "Als De Tokèh" - RCA 48 130 - (1956)

Extended play

- Rudi Waitara presents his Amboina Serenaders Vol. 1
  "Panggajo E Panggajo", "Sarinandé" / "Hoera Hoera Tjintjin", "Ajo Mama" - RCA 75 152, CID 75 152 - (1956)
- Rudi Waitara presents his Amboina Serenaders Vol. II
  "Hela Rotan", "Nona Pédédé" / "Goro Goro Né", "Kami Berlajar" - RCA 75 153 - (1956)
- Rudi Waitara presents his Amboina Serenaders Vol. III
  "Soerabaja", "Meisjelief" / "Klappermelk Met Suiker", "Heimwee Naar Ambon" - RCA 75 158 - (1956)
- Rudi Wairata & zijn Amboina Serenaders - Amboina
  "E Tanasé", "Waktoe Potong Padi" / "Ramai Pendang", "Binta Ingin Mau Poelang" - RCA 75 172, CID 75 172
- Rudi Wairata & zijn Amboina Serenaders
  "Autoderma", "Sioh Manis" / "Waltz Ampir Ziang", "Nona Manis" - CID 75 865 - (1956)

Albums

- Rudi Wairata and his Amboina Serenaders – Amboina - RCA – 130.153

=== Rudi Wairata and his Hawaiian Minstrels ===
Singles

- Rudi Wairata & his Hawaiian Minstrels - "My Hula Love" / "Waltzing At Dawn" - RCA 45 003 - (1958)
- Rudi Wairata & his Hawaiian Minstrels - "Mahalani Papado" / "Rock And Roll And Breezes" - RCA 45 004 - (1958)
- Rudi Wairata & his Hawaiian Minstrels - " Kilohara" / "Ua Ua" - RCA 47 9246 - (1958)
- Rudi Wairata & his Hawaiian Minstrels - "Hawaiian Wedding Song" (Ke Kali Nei An) / "Minehaha" - RCA 47-9247 - (1959)
- Rudi Wairata & his Hawaiian Minstrels - "Hawaiian Choo Choo" / "South Sea Swing" - RCA 4/60216 - (1960)

=== Rudi Wairata & his Serenaders ===
- Rudi Wairata & his Serenaders - "Dajoeng Sampan" / "Ladjoe Ladjoe" - RCA 45 004 - (1985)
- Rudi Wairata & his Serenaders - "Omdat Ik Van Je Hou" / "My Ambon Manise É" - RCA 45 006 - (1958)

=== Ke Aloha Hawaiian Strings ===
Singles

- "Sweet Georgia Brown" / Orange Grove Of California" - CNR F 204 - (1959)
- "The One Rose" / "Fascinating Rhythm" - CNR F 205 - (1959)

=== Das Moana Quartett ===
Singles

- Das Moana Quartett - "Maui-chimes" / "Holoku-waltz" - "Ariola 45 267 A - (1961)
- Das Moana Quartett - "Kaiwahu-Marsch" / "On the beach of Waikiki" - Ariola 10 954 AT - (1963)

Extended play

- Von Manilla bis Hawaii
  "Maui Chimes", "Mauna-Kea" / Tomi Tomi", "Holoku Waltz" - Ariola 36 461 C - (1961)
- Rudy Wairata & Das Moana Quartett - Am Strand von Waikiki
  "Kaiwahu March", "Blue Hawaii" / "Honolulu March", "On The Beach Of Waikiki" - Ariola 40 090 CT - (1961)
- Rudy Wairata & Das Moana Quartett - Waikiki Melodie
  "Kaiwahu March", "Blue Hawaii", "Honolulu March", "On The Beach Of Waikiki" - Baccarola 41 888 VU - (1961)

=== Rudy Wairata & his Hawaiian Boys ===
Singles

- Rudy Wairata & his Hawaiian Boys - "Aloha Rag" / "Catamaran" - Teener 45-STU 42143 - (1962)
- Rudy Wairata & his Hawaiian Boys - "Der Blaue Hawaii Express" / "Die Faszinierende Hawaiian Gitarre" - 777 63-03 - (1963)
- Rudy Wairata & his Hawaiian Boys - "Taruna Serenade" / "Bora Bora Marsch" - 777 63-09 - (1963)
- Rudy Wairata and his Hawaiian Boys - "Steel Guitar Rag" / "Bora Bora Marsch" - Teener 45-STU 42190 - (1963)

=== Rudy Wairata and his Kilima Hawaiians ===
Albums

- Rudy Wairata and his Kilima Hawaiians - Rudy Wairata And The Kilima Hawaiians - CNR GA 5015 - (1963)
- Rudi Wairata en de Kilima Hawaiians – Hawaiian Melodies - CNR HAS 5099
- Rudi Wairata en de Kilima Hawaiians – Kapulani March - CNR 241.371 - (1972)

=== Rudi Wairata Und Sein Hula Girls ===
- Rudi Wairata Und Sein Hula Girls - "Hula Lu" / "Sweety, Sweety Von Tahiti" - Decca D 19 697 - (1965)

=== Rudy Wairata and the Oriental Four ===
- Rudy Wairata and the Oriental Four – The Magic Of The Orient - Music For Pleasure – 1A022-58163 - (1981)
