= Wanda de Fretes =

- Also known as: Wanda Aubrey
- Born: Elvira Carolina de Fretes; 8 January 1946 (age 80); Ternate, Indonesia
- Genres: Rock' Roll, Indonesian folk, Malayan folk

Wanda de Fretes is a singer and recording artist who was popular in the Netherlands in the 1960s. She is also the daughter of legendary Moluccan steel guitarist George de Fretes and singer Joyce Aubrey. In addition to her solo efforts, she also recorded with her mother as the duo Wanda & Joyce. Besides singing pop and rock'n roll, she also sang traditional Indonesian and Malayan songs.

== Background ==
Wanda was born in Bandung, Indonesia in 1946 to parents George de Fretes and Joyce Aubrey, both of them musicians. Like her parents, she eventually became a recording artist. By 1952, her parents had divorced and she and her mother had moved to the Netherlands. Around 1958, her father arrived in the Netherlands, after having stowed away on a ship believed to be the MS Johan van Oldenbarnevelt. By 1962 she was living with her mother in the Hague.

She was married to Don Jerome who was a drummer with the band the Fire Devils. She had two daughters with him.

In later years she resided in Los Angeles, California.

== Career ==
In the early 1960s both her and her mother Joyce were becoming quite popular in the Netherlands as singers of Malayan songs. An extended play was released by Fontana Records. It contained the songs "Ajoen", "Patokaan", "Rasa Sajang" and "Koleh". Also in that year under the name Wanda "De Loco-Motion" bw "Sweetie" was released on Decca.

In 1968, she was in Indonesia with her father. Things didn't go too well for them there. Also later in 1968, she and her father toured the United States with Abraham Bueno de Mesquita, The Shepherds and Johnny Jordaan.

=== Later years ===
In September 2010, she took a trip from California to the third Chanos International Steel Guitar Festival aka CISGF that was held in Chanos-Curson, France. She was there to receive a posthumous European Steel Guitar Hall of Fame award for her father. While at the festival she did some singing and was backed by René and Nora Ranti from the Netherlands. Playing along with them on a vintage Rickenbacker S8 console steel guitar, was Rod King and on bass guitar, his wife Rosemary.

== Discography (Wanda) ==
=== Singles ===
- "Let's twist again" / "Shall we twist" - Decca FM 264 431 - (1961)
- "Twist-les" / "Twisties twist" - JanJé F 106 797 - (1962)
- " De loco-motion" / "Sweety" - Decca FM 264 475 - (1962)
- "Sukiyaki" (In Yokohama) / "De kelder van Billy" - Decca AT 10 016 - (1963)
- "Wow wow wee" / "'n Witte bloem" - Decca AT 10 053 - (1964)
- "Locomotion" / "Sweetie" - Fontana TF 266 475 - (1964)

=== Albums ===
- Wanda & Coy Pereira – Krontjong Herinneringen II - Polydor 236 806

=== Various artist compilations ===
10" LP

- * Tijd Voor Teenagers! - 2 - Philips 600 701 PR (10-inch LP) - Song: "The Loco-motion"

12" LP

- 5 Seconden van "Woef"! - Decca DU 170 002 - (1964) - Song: "Eight Men" (with The Explosions)
- Pasar Malam - Fontana 626 344 QL - (1967) - Song: "'N Witte Bloem"
- Pasar Malam Parels - Philips 6423 386 - (1980) - Song: "'N Witte Bloem"

Compact disc

- Beatmeisjes - Uitgeverij L.J. Veen CD001 - (2002) - Song: "De Kelder Van Billy"
- Nederlandse Liedjes Door De Jaren Heen - De Jaren '60 - Reader's Digest D 060012 DD - (2006) - Song: "De Loco-motion"
- Indorock - Instrumentals & Rarities Prebeat - Universal 372 021-0 - (2012)- Song: "De Kelder Van Billy"

== Discography (Wanda and Joyce) ==
=== Singles ===
- "Ajun, Ajun" / "Es Gibt Ein Wunderland" - Fontana – 266 394 TF
- "Zwei Braune Hawaiianos" / "Honolulu-Tamoure" - Fontana 266 420 TF - (1962)

=== Various artist compilations ===
12" LP

- Pasar Malam - Fontana 626 344 QL - (1967) - Songs: "Dajung-Dajung", "Oléh-Oléh Bandung" (With The Rhythm Brothers)
