= Sausalito (song) =

Single by Rosy & Andres
- B-side: "Dance Dance"
- Released: 1975
- Genre: Pop
- Label: CNR
- Songwriter(s): A. Holten, M. Manengkei

Rosy & Andres singles chronology
"Sausalito"	"I was Born to Love"

"Sausilito" is the first single by Netherlands-based singing duo Rosy & Andres. It was written by Andres Holten and Marshal Manengkei. In the Netherlands, it peaked at No. 7 and spent four weeks on the charts.

== History ==
Rosy Pereira had previously recorded as Babe Pereira. She is also the daughter of Indonesian steel guitarist Coy Pereira. Andres is a Dutch singer, songwriter of Indonesian descent. In 1972, he represented the Netherlands at the 1972 Eurovision Song Contest. Previously he was part of the duo Sandra & Andres. In June 1977, Rosy & Andres were sent to Romania along with singers Therese Steinmetz and Conny Vink and a violin duo made up of Sem Vijveen & Benny Behr. They were on a five-day visit. "Sausilito" was sung in Romanian and the title changed to "Bucaresti".
