= Alta Gracia (song) =

Single by Oscar Harris

from the album A day will come
- B-side: "'I'll take good care of you'"
- Released: 1974
- Genre: Pop, Easy listening
- Length: 3.45
- Label: Balet records
- Songwriter(s): Oscar Harris, Imro Wielkens

Oscar Harris singles chronology
"Alta Gracia" (1974)	"Sing Your Freedom Song (LP album)" (1975)

Alta Gracia is a popular slow song by Surinamese-born Dutch singer Oscar Harris. It was released in Turkey, Mexico and Netherlands as a 45 rpm record in 1974. The reverse side of the record is I'll Take Good Care of You.
