= My Love (Rosy & Andres song) =

1976 single by Rosy & Andres

Single by Rosy & Andres
- A-side: "My Love"
- B-side: "I Wanna Be Your baby"
- Released: 1976
- Genre: Pop
- Label: CNR, Telefunken, Pye, Uni
- Songwriter(s): A. Holten, M. Manengkei

Rosy & Andres singles chronology
""I Was Born To Love""	"My Love"	""I Believe In You""

"My Love"

Single by Tony Servi & Corina
- A-side: "My Love"
- B-side: "Terug Naar Vlaanderen"
- Released: 1993
- Genre: Pop
- Label: J.R.P.
- Songwriter(s): A. Holten, M. Manengkei
- Producer(s): Jack Rivers

Tony Servi & Corina singles chronology
"My Love"	""Het Avontuur""

My Love was a top ten hit for Netherlands-based pop duo Rosy & Andres in 1976.

== The song ==
The October 9, 1976 issue of Billboard reported that "My Love" reached position no 3 in the Dutch chart, just behind "In Zaire" by Johnny Wakelin and with "Dancing Queen" by ABBA at no 1. By October 23, 1976 the Billboard chart reported that it had dropped to no 8. In Holland it was released on CNR, release no. CNR 141 351.

== Singers ==
Rosy is the daughter of Indonesian steel guitarist Coy Pereira, and had previously recorded as Babe Pereira. Andres is a Dutch singer, songwriter of Indonesian descent. In 1972, he represented the Netherlands at the 1972 Eurovision Song Contest. Previously he was part of the duo Sandra & Andres.

== Composers ==
The song was composed by the singer Andres Holten and Marshal Manengkei. They had earlier composed "Sausilito" which was a 1975 hit.

== Other versions ==
Some seventeen years later in 1993, Belgian vocal duo Tony Servi & Corina had a hit in their country with "My Love", CD single JRP 931022. It reached no. 34 on the Beligian charts. It was arranged by Patrick Renier, produced by Jack Rivers and released on Rivers's J.R.P label.
