= Amboina Serenaders =

Dutch musical group

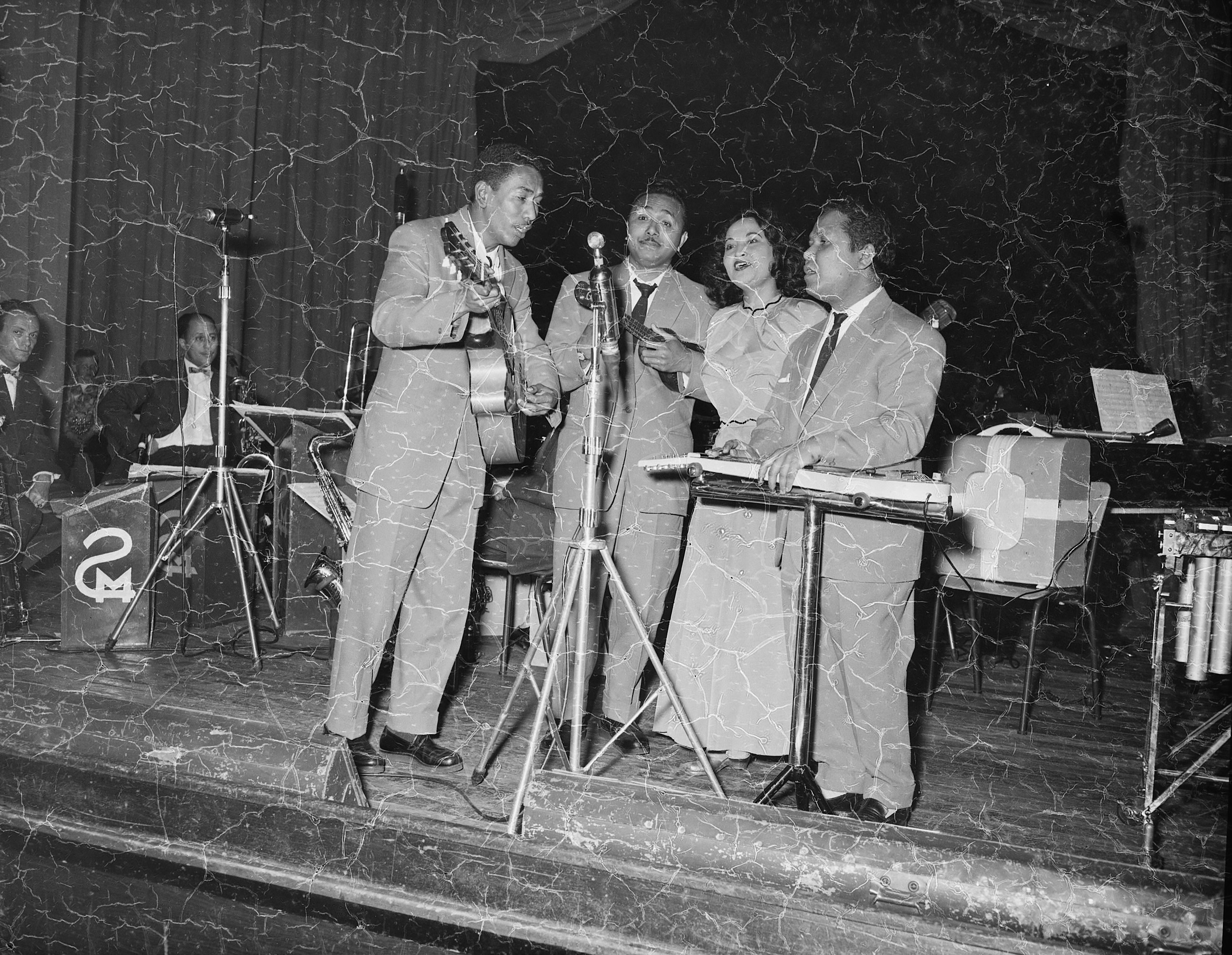
- Ambonia Serenaders in Haarlem, 1956

Background information
- Origin: The Netherlands
- Genres: Hawaiian music; Moluccan
- Labels: Omega, RCA Records, Dureco
- Past members: Rudi Wairata; Ming Luhulima; Charlie Kuipers; Joyce Aubrey; Joop Sahanaya; Jack Salakory

The Amboina Serenaders were a successful and popular group that did well in the Netherlands in the 1950s. Its members included Ming Luhulima, Rudi Wairata and Joyce Aubrey, the ex-wife of George de Fretes. They had a top ten hit in the Netherlands with "Klappermelk Met Suiker". They are named after the city of Ambon in the Maluku Islands.

== History ==
The Amboina Serenaders evolved out of the Mena Muria Minstrels, a group founded by Rudi Wairata in 1950.

== Line ups ==
The line up included George de Fretes's ex-wife Joyce Aubrey. Another member of the group was Miing Luhulima. In addition to Wairata, Luhulima and Aubrey, their 1953 line up also included Jack Salakory and Joop Sahanaya. In that year, there was a disagreement of sorts within the group which caused founder Wairata to leave. From then onwards, the group was led by Luhulima. In 1958, Aubrey left the band to join the Royal Hawaiian Minstrels which was a band led by her former husband George. The group broke up some time after that.

== Recordings ==
In 1955, they did well with "Goro Goro Né’". The following year their single "Klappermelk Met Suiker" which was composed by Pierre Wijnnobel peaked at #9, spending 5 weeks in the charts. The title of the song translates as "I want coconut milk with sugar.

== Later years ==
In 1981, founding member Rudi Wairata died.

== Members ==
- Joyce Aubrey aka Joyce de Fretes - Vocals
- Charlie Kuipers - Steel Guitar
- Ming Luhulima - Ukulele
- David Nanuru - Steel Guitar
- Joop Sahanaya - Guitar
- Tjak Salakory - Bass
- Rudi Wairata - Steel Guitar

=== Other members ===
- Pariury
- Patty

== Discography ==
=== 78 RPM Singles ===
- The Amboina Serenaders O.l.v. Rudi Wairata – "Ja Hoera" / "Hela Arombai" - RCA – 18154
- Rudi Wairata En Zijn Amboina Serenaders - "Nona Pédédé" / "Hoera Hoera Tjintjin" - RCA 28105 - (1955)
- Rudi Wairata En Zijn Amboina Serenaders - "Ik wil klappermelk met suiker" / "Soerabaja" - RCA 28117 - (1956)
- Rudi Wairata And His Amboina Serenaders – "É-Tanasé" / "Waktoe-Potong-Padi" - RCA – 28119
- Rudi Wairata And His Amboina Serenaders – "Goodbye To You Nona Manis" / "Kota Ambon" - RCA – 28129 - (1956)

=== 45 RPM singles ===
- The Amboina Serenaders - "Panggajo E Panggajo" / "Sarinandé" - RCA 48102 - (1955)
- The Amboina Serenaders - "Waktoe Potong Padi" / "E Tanase" - Omega 35.357 - (1962)
- The Amboina Serenaders - "Goodbye To You Nona Manis" / "Kota Ambon" - Omega 35.359 - (1962)

=== Extended play ===
- The Amboina Serenaders - "Ouw-Ulat Ee", "Pantai Waijamé" / "Ladju-Ladju", " Hoehaté" - CID 75.875 - (1957)

=== 10" LP ===
- Rudi Wairata And His Amboina Serenaders – Amboina - RCA 130.153 L.P

=== 12" LP ===
- Amboina Serenaders – Goodbye To You, Nona Manis - Dureco 51.054
- The Amboina Serenaders* o.l.v. Ming Luhulima - The Amboina Serenaders - GIP – 2L 51.015/16 - (1967)
- Ming Luhulima And His Amboina Serenaders - Ming Luhulima And His Amboina Serenaders - Dureco 51.005
