= Strengholt Holding =

Strengholt BV
- Type: Private
- Industry: Media, entertainment, publishing, music publishing
- Founded: 1928
- Headquarters: Naarden, Netherlands
- Products: Books, magazines, music, audio and visual recordings, digital projects

Strengholt BV, started in 1928 as a publisher of books and magazines, is an international media and entertainment company.

== Core activities ==
- leasing music rights and the national and international administration of copyrights;
- the publication and distribution of (sheet) music both nationally and internationally;
- the production, distribution and marketing of audio and visual recordings;
- the publication of books, magazines and specials;
- the development and realization of media and digital projects.

In 1971 Strengholt relocated its head office from the Leidsegracht in Amsterdam to Naarden and established itself in the monumental ‘Oud-Bussem’ Hofstede. This extensive complex, with the largest thatched roof in the Netherlands, was built between 1903 and 1906 and for the first 50 years it was used as a hygienic milking parlour. The architects Berlage and Dudok considered it to be the best work of master builder K.P.C. de Bazel (1869–1923). The ‘Oud-Bussem’ Hofstede is now a listed building.

== Strengholt Music Group ==
Strengholt Music Group has been one of the largest independent music publishers in the Benelux for more than 50 years.

The group's activities include the leasing of music rights(copyrights), publishing (sheet) music, and exclusively representing foreign and Dutch music publishers such as Stage Entertainment, NOS and MTV Networks.

The catalogue of the Strengholt Music Group includes evergreens, national and international hits by Chuck Berry, Jan Smit, Belinda Meuldijk (Rob de Nijs), Emile Hartkamp (Frans Bauer), Piet Souer, Ferry Corsten, Showtek, Markus Schulz, Paul Elstak, Peter van Asten and Laurens van Rooyen.

As the owner of Dureco, among the oldest record labels in the Netherlands, the Strengholt Music Group is involved in leasing music productions. This catalogue includes Vader Abraham, Corry & de Rekels, Jacques Herb, Intwine, De Kermisklanten, Anita Meyer, Mieke, Benny Neyman and many more.

In July 2023, CTM Outlander announced that it would acquire Strengholt Music Group.

== Strengholt Entertainment ==
Strengholt Entertainment sells and distributes media products to retailers. It organise the sale, marketing and distribution of DVDs, Blu-ray, CDs, games and media accessories.

== Strengholt Connect ==
Strengholt Connect is an IT and marketing agency. Strengholt Connect develops websites and web shops and manages online marketing for companies. Strengholt Connect was responsible for the development of Free Record Shop that went bankrupt in 2014.

== Strengholt MultiMedia ==
Strengholt MultiMedia is a Dutch publisher of special-interest DVDs and Blu-ray Discs.

Sport, documentaries, lifestyle, culture and travel, films, war, music, The Royal family, TV series / programmes, nature and animals and historical reviews form part of the diverse catalogue. Sport represents an important element of the catalogue and includes football, cycle racing, skating and hockey.

Of historical significance are the Beeld van Nederland series with the NOS/Polygoon newsreels from 1920 to 2010, De strijd tegen het water and the Koninklijk Huis. The sport DVDs and historical reviews are produced in collaboration with the NOS and the Netherlands Institute for Sound and Vision.

== European Music Centre ==
EMC is both a publisher and distributor of sheet music covering all types of music genres. A variety of songbooks of well-known Dutch artists is also published, including Nick & Simon, Marco Borsato and Boudewijn de Groot.

As a distributor, EMC represents 50 national and international publishing houses.

== Strengholt Content ==
Strengholt Content focuses on the development of content for new media and television. This business unit develops and creates sponsored format for brands, businesses and organisations by drawing as much effective attention as possible to their products and services. Strengholt Content is responsible for the Beauty+ magazine, a weekly TV programme broadcast by RTL4 with advertisers and sponsors from the beauty sector.

== Strengholt's Books ==
=== Strengholt United Media ===
The book publishing house is the Strengholt's oldest line of business (1928) and in its long history has managed to build up a diverse list, both in the field of fiction and non-fiction.

The principal list titles cover health, esoteric/parapsychology, history and politics, management and media, nature and animals, children and youngsters, music, culinary art, biographies and novels. In publishes the Dutch translations of The Old Man and the Sea (Ernest Hemingway), Jonathan Livingston Seagull (Richard Bach), and The Source (James Michener). In the music book market, it publishes Eenvoudige muziekleer (Hennie Schouten) and Professioneel zingen voor iedereen (Ineke van Doorn).

=== Strengholt Magazines ===
As a publisher of magazines and specials, Strengholt Magazines publishes the magazine Beauty+ to which medical specialists contribute. Beauty+ focuses on cosmetic treatments, skin and hair care, anti-aging and wellness.
