= Oscar Harris =

Surinamese singer

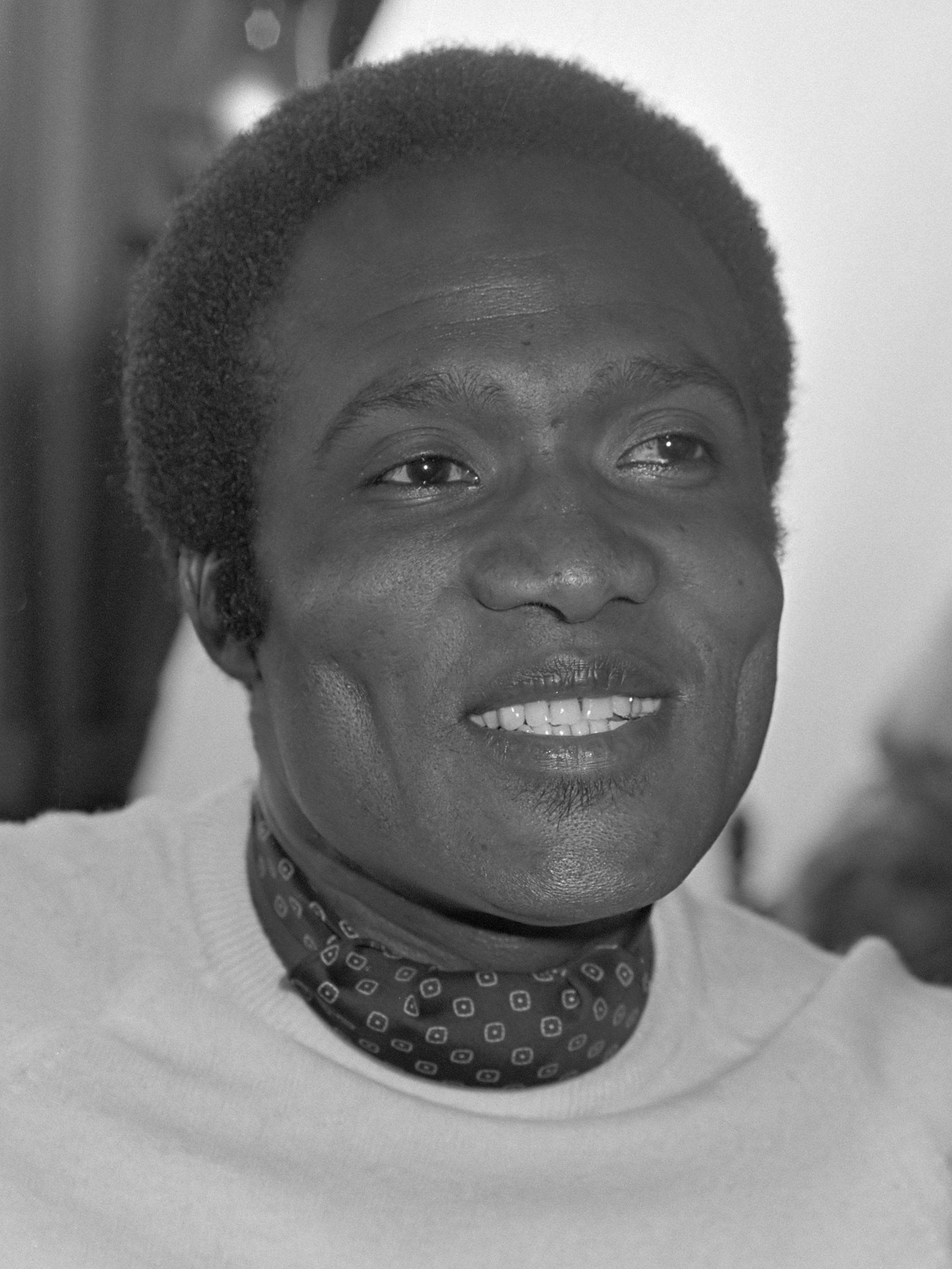
- Harris in 1981

Background information
- Born: 30 November 1943 (age 81); Albina, Suriname
- Genres: Pop, soul
- Occupation: Singer
- Instrument: Vocals
- Years active: 1970–present

Oscar Harris (born 30 November 1943) is a Surinamese singer. He was among the best known Surinamese musicians in the Netherlands during the 1970s and 1980s.

Harris moved to Amsterdam to study architecture in 1963, and founded Oscar Harris and The Twinkle Stars, a ten-man vocal and instrumental group in 1965, which became known by playing at student gatherings in Amsterdam. In 1968 the group was signed to the artist roster of Omega Records and Blue Elephant, with a tour of South America in 1971.

In 1974, Harris went solo with the single "Alta Gracia", commencing a series of hit-singles up to 1988. He had also recorded some hits in Indonesia, including "Sandy" and "Oh Tuhan".

In 2015 TopNotch released a compilation CD in the Sranan Gowtu-series (Surinamese Gold) devoted to Surinamese artists, mainly from the 1970s.

== Discography ==
- 1969 Try a little love
- 1969 Soldiers prayer
- 1974 2
- 1974 A day will come
- 1974 Alta Gracia
- 1975 Sing your freedom song
- 1977 De beste
- 1978 One of a kind
- 1980 Song for the children
- 1981 Best
- 1982 It takes two
- 1983 Everybody loves somebody
- 1984 Take good care of her
- 1987 With lots of love
- 1988 Love for the world
- 2004 Salsa romantica
- 2005 Dutch rare groove
- 2009 Shalom Salam (i.s.m. Flower to the People)
- 2010 Song for Pakistan Faith Hope and Love (i.s.m. Flower to the People)
