= Gotcha! (band) =

Dutch funk band

- Origin: Haarlem, The Netherlands
- Genres: Funk rock; psychedelic funk; hard rock
- Years active: 1988 – now
- Labels: BMG-Ariola, BMG, FUNKFACE-BMG
- Past members: Rudiment Conga "RC" (Rudi de Graaff) Bone (Erik Boon); Homie (Martijn Bosman); Nyjolene Grey; Vince the GogoPrince (Vincent Smeenk); Joep da Dupe (Joep Smeenk); Pooperman (Pieter Smeenk); Arnold Smits; Kid Crash; Ireapeat (Pieter Both); KoenFu (Koen Lommerse); Pete Philly; Fabian Dech; Senna Gourdou; DJMC Dynamax; Janice Williams; Michael "Maikal X" Parkinson; Sweet Charles Sherrell; Michael "Clip" Payne; Lige Curry; Cordell "Boogie" Mosson; Mary Griffin; Marcel Schmidt; Mizza Hendrix; Piet van Steenis Ivar Lelieveld

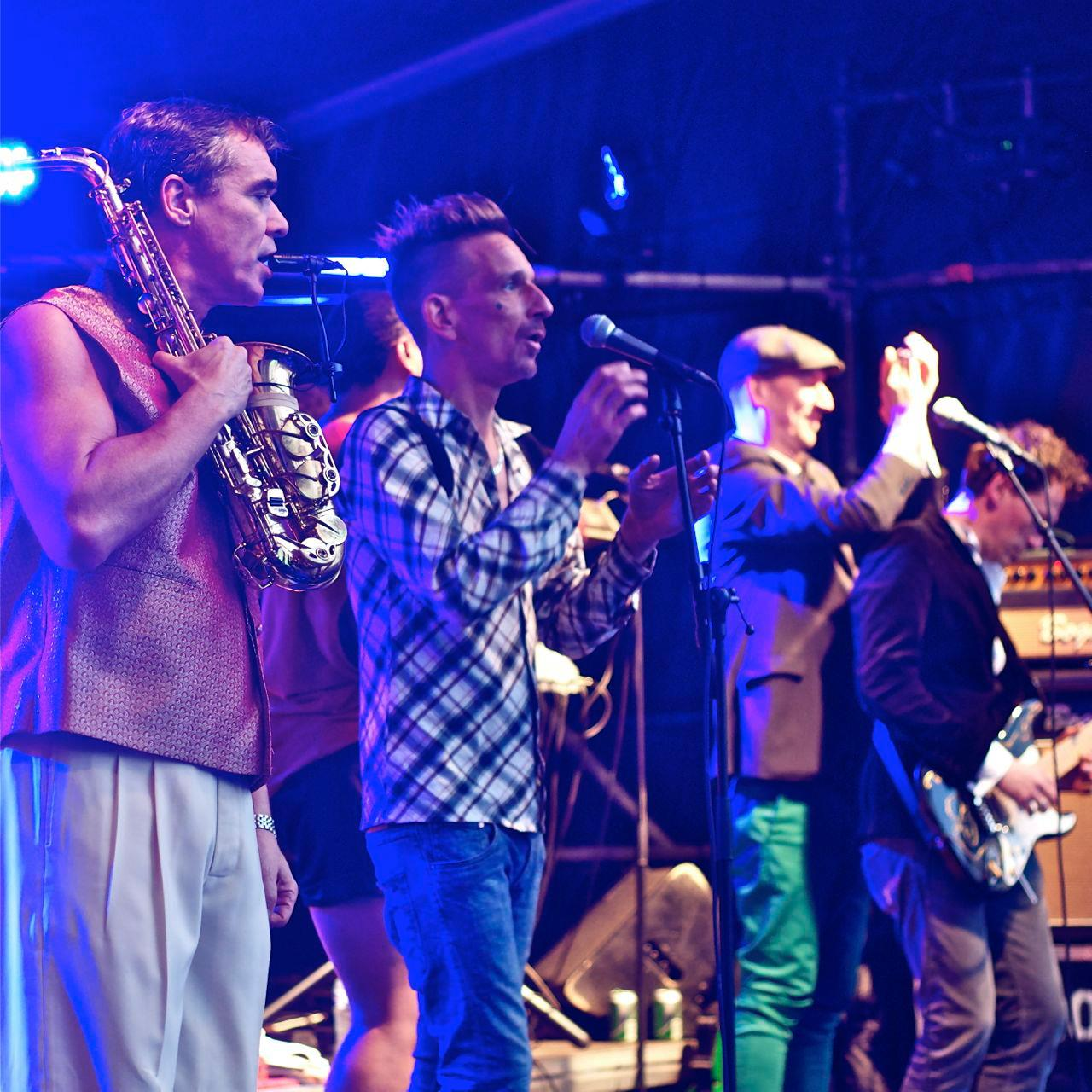
Gotcha

Gotcha! is a Dutch funk band founded in 1989; their music, a mixture of sixties-trip-rock with funk and hip-hop, is influenced by George Clinton.

== History ==
=== 1989-1993 ===
Gotcha! took part in national band contest de Grote Prijs van Nederland; they settled for bronze but were offered a record-contract. In 1991 they released their debut album Words and Music from the Lowlands included the singles "Da Ten Is Mightier Than the Sword" and "Mathilda the Wicked Witch". In 1992 they previewed new tracks on a radio and TV concert with 17-year-old rapper Michael Parkinson of later Postmen-fame standing in for Ten. The studio-versions of "Naked", "MTV-ling" and "Where Have You Been So Long" appeared in 1993 on GOTCHA! GOTCHA! GOTCHA!, but the rock 'n roll-lifestyle that the band bought into had taken its toll. Singer/guitarist Robadope Ro and rapper 'Rockattack Ten' staged a fistfight during a gig in France and the original line-up fell apart. Ro lived down his Gotcha!-years by DJing in Tokyo; upon his return to the Netherlands he joined freakcore-band De Raggende Manne as a guitarist and songwriter. Drummer Martijn Bosman moved to Beeswamp in an attempt "to recapture that Gotcha!-vibe". Percussionist Rudi Conga performed with Hipbone Connection.

=== 1995-1998 ===
Gotcha! continued in a new line-up including guitarist Koen Fu. In 1995 they released Four: It! The Terra-P-Funk from Beyond Space (single: "Babies"). Ten left a year later to pursue a solo-career; he recorded two albums, toured with George Clinton and moved to London (although New York was his first option).

Ro, Bosman and Rudi reunited as founding members of Ro & Paradise Funk; they released two albums that found critical acclaim, but no commercial success. The band were forced to split when a hernia kept Ro grounded for a year. Bosman went on to play with upcoming-stars Ilse de Lange and Kane. Rudi spent the summer of '99 performing as a vocalist with the one-off band Kor en de Amigos at travelling-festival De Parade; he then took over Martijn's column-page in free music-monthly FRET.

=== 2002-2005 ===
The remaining members staged a comeback-tour and released a live-album as well as a Dutch-language-single ("Je Moet Je Bek Houwe", about the fine art of keeping your mouth shut). Nico 'Kid Crash' Noot shared rhymes with junior rappers De Moordgasten, the omitted MC Krimson and Osdorp Posse-frontman Def P. It became their biggest hit ever.

Meanwhile, departed members Koen Fu and I-Repeat found commercial success with their reggae-band Beef.

Ro, also a drummer and compere for De Grote Prijs, formed breakbeat-soulband OlaBola with Rudi and former RPF-organist Nico Brandsen. Their debut-single "Problems" was originally used in a TV commercial and secured them a string of festival dates. By early 2005 Ro fell out with Brandsen and OlaBola broke up. Rudi and Martijn appeared at the Pinkpop Festival as JunkieXL's touring musicians; they backed former Republica-singer Saffron among others.

=== 2008-2019 ===
In 2008 music-monthly OOR published an article on Gotcha! as part of a lookback on Dutch pop-music's 50-year history. A reunion of the original band was considered; Ro agreed but eventually quit the music-scene altogether. Thus members of both line-ups merged into Gotcha All Stars; they toured from 2009 till 2011.

The same year Rudi and I-Repeat formed Jah6, a reggae-band playing converted covers of classic Dutch-language songs by artists as Andre Hazes, Willy Alberti and Corry Konings (the latter ending up on a re-recording of her own hit "Mooi Was Die Tijd"). They are planning a follow-up to their 2011 debut album. Members of Gotcha! and Jah6 also performed in Rudi's covers band The Graaffy.

In 2016, Dutch leading music website Maxazine.nl announced E1 Ten was leaving the band. In January 2019, E1 Ten finally released 'The Lovefunk', with the help of amongst others (ex-) Gotcha!-members Martijn Bosman, Michael Parkinson, Janice Williams and Rudi de Graaff.

== Discography ==
Year	Title	Label
1991	Words and Music from da Lowlands	BMG/Ariola Blx
1993	Gotcha! Gotcha! Gotcha!	BMG/Ariola Blx
1997	Four: It! The Terra P-Funk from Beyond Space	Blue Funk
2002	5.2559551/2200	Funkface/BMG Nl
2003	Live from the Oldschool	Funkface/BMG Nl
2015	Back to the Moon	Sounds Haarlem Likes Vinyl
2023	Gotcha! Gotcha! Gotcha! - 12"inch Vinyl	Sounds Haarlem Likes Vinyl
