= Rene van Helsdingen =

Dutch pianist and composer (born 1957)

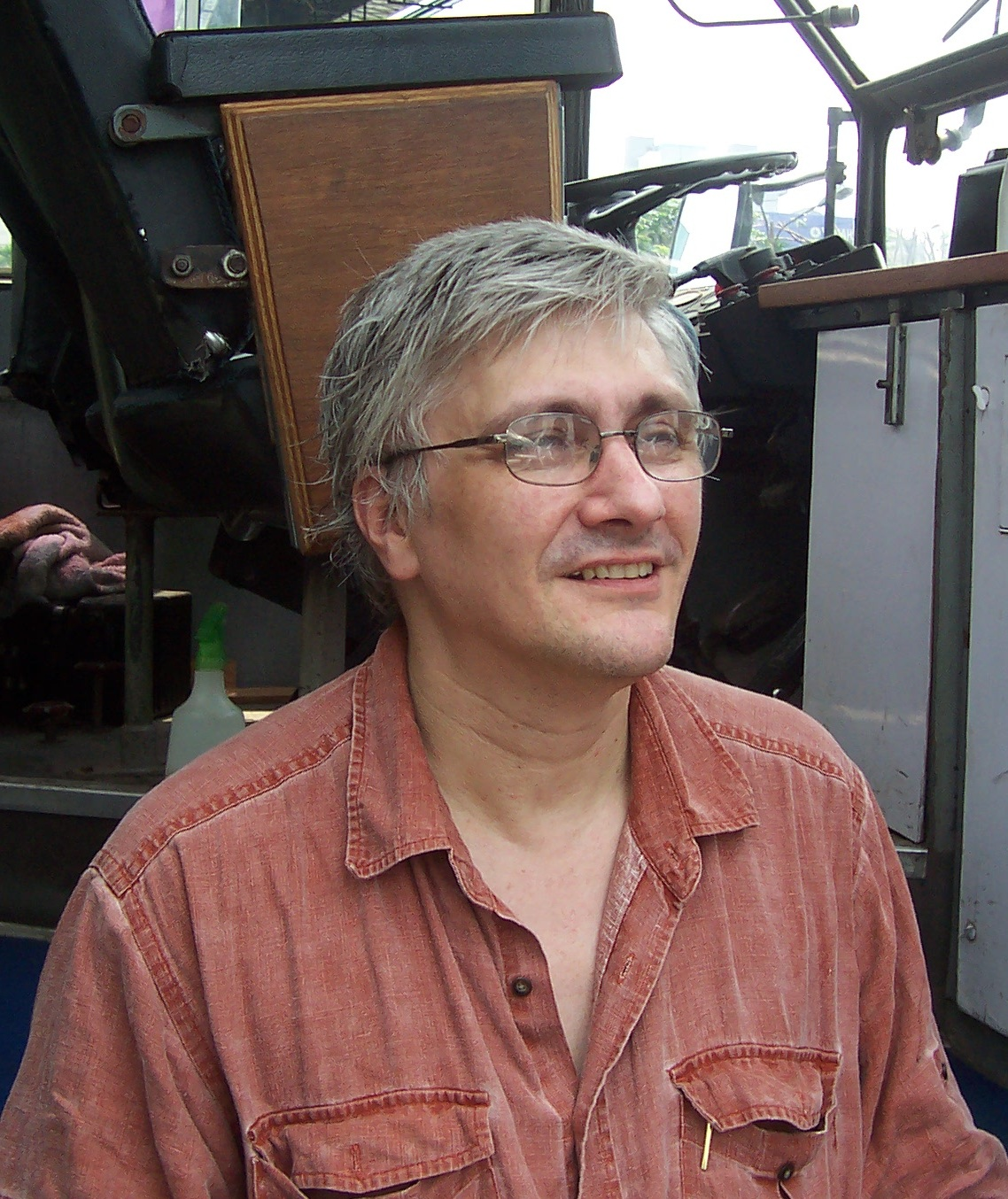
- Rene van Helsdingen in 2008

Background information
- Birth name: Rene Peter Onno Rubiono
- Born: February 25, 1957 (age 68); Jakarta, Indonesia
- Genres: jazz
- Occupation(s): Pianist, composer, organizer
- Instrument: Piano
- Years active: 1975–present
- Website: www.renevanhelsdingen.com

Rene Peter Onno Rubiono van Helsdingen (born 25 February 1957) is a Dutch pianist and composer.

== Biography ==
He studied classical music with Komter Loeber in Blaricum in the Netherlands from 1962 to 1972. Then he studied jazz music with Terry Trotter and Lazlo Cser in Los Angeles in 1979. His earliest influences include Oscar Peterson, McCoy Tyner and Bill Evans.

Over the years pianist René has recorded and produced for many different labels, such as Virgin, Timeless, WEA, Dureco, Zebra Acoustic, Pacific Music, Turning Point records, Munich Records, demajors Independent Music Industry Jakarta and his own labels: Relukreul records, and Helsdingen Music, The Netherlands. Helsdingen writes most of his repertoire. Australian newspaper The Age characterised him as "A rewarding pianist who can play comfortably in the groove, or create more impressionistic patterns, or quiet, subtle musings. Perhaps the most notable quality of his solos is brevity. René allows himself a few extended workouts and avoids the trap of repeating himself or overstating his case."

Helsdingen has organized many successful tours, projects and festivals sponsored by NGOs, governmental institutions, companies to which he was responsible with regard to the control over the budgets made available.
