= Kilima Hawaiians =

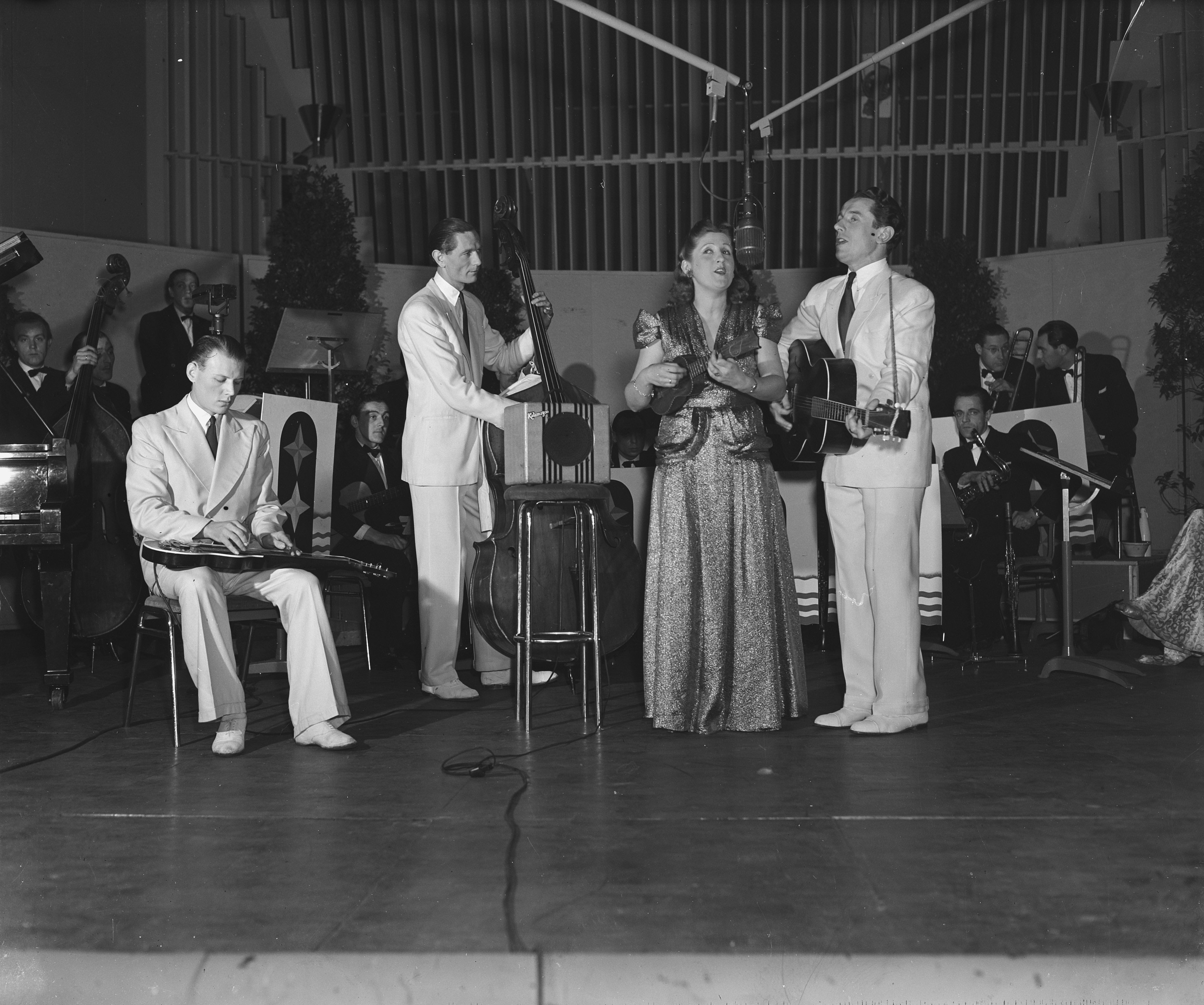
- The Kilima Hawaiians at De bonte dinsdagavondtrein

Background information
- Origin: The Netherlands
- Genres: Hawaiian music
- Years active: 1934 - 199?
- Labels: 777, CBS

The Kilima Hawaiians were a well known and popular Dutch Hawaiian music group who had a hit with a cover of Carson Robinson's "Bridle Hanging On The Wall" (Dutch; "Er hangt een Paardenhoofdstel aan de Muur" / German; "Es hängt ein Pferdehalfter an der Wand"). Some of the steel guitarists that played with them were Rudi Wairata, Coy Pereira and Frans Doolaard.

== Background ==
The group was led and founded by Bill Buijsman in 1934, and started out as the Kilima Trio. With the growing popularity of Hawaiian music in post-war Holland they were considered the rage.

=== 1950s ===
In 1953, they had a no 1 hit in Germany with "Es hängt ein Pferdehalfter an der Wand". Buijsman wrote the song "Cowboys Wiegenlied" which was the single's B side.

In 1958, Indonesian steel guitarist Wairata joined the group. During his time with them, he recorded "Whistling Guitar", which featured Wairata making bird sound effects with his steel guitar. His Ambonese background was said to be an influence on the group's sound.

=== 1960s ===
In 1960, the group was doing quite well with their German tour, performing at American service bases. Wairata decided to leave the group and remain in Germany. He was replaced by Coy Pereira who remained with the group for a while and made some recordings with them. But he left to take up an office position in Rotterdam. Pereira was replaced by Frans Doolaard who would remain with them for three years.

In late 1960, they were signed to Lambertus B. de Jonge's new 777 record label. Their 1965 album Farewell Hawaii received a favorable review from Billboard with their adding a pop sound to the music.

In 1967, Pereira rejoined the group.

In 1968, their album Rhythm of the Islands was released by CBS Holland.

=== 1970s ===
As of 1977, they were said to be the longest running Hawaiian music ensemble in the world. Around that time the line up included Bill Buysman, Mary Buysman Coen Van Nassau, Wim Van Herpen, Coy Pereira and Luut Buysman.

=== Members ===
Rudi Wairata died in Rotterdam in 1981. Bill Buijsman died in 1991 and Mary Mary Buijsman died in 2002. Coy Pereira died on April 12, 2005, aged 86. The last surviving member, Vic Spangenberg, who joined the group in 1938, died at the age of 94 in Alkmaar on April 30, 2016.

== Members ==
- Bill Buijsman - guitar
- Mary Buijsman - vocals, ukulele
- Luut Buijsman - vocals, guitar
- Coy Pereira - lap steel guitar
- Frans Van Oirschot guitar, pedal steel
- Willem Ruivenkamp - ?
- Jo De Gast - lap steel
- Theo Ehrlicher - laps steel
- Rudi Wairata - lap steel
- Vic Spangenberg - lap steel
- Frans Doolaard - pedal steel
- Wim van Herpen - bass guitar
- Bob van Maaren - ukulele
