= Omega (record label) =

- Genre: Various
- Country of origin: Netherlands

Omega is a Dutch record label that released records under Omega and its sub label Omega International from the 1940s through to the 1990s. The distribution was handled by Dureco. In Belgium, its releases were handled by Fonior. Some of the artists to have their work released on the label in the early 1960s include The Dutch Cocktail Trio. In the 1970s, Omega pushed out MOR music and also artists from non English speaking European countries such as Germany, France, Italy and Spain.

== 78 RPM 10" Shellac singles catalogue (selective) ==
=== 1947–1956 ===
- Fud Candrix And His Orchestra – "Midnight Boogie" / "Jam Boogie" – Omega 9239 – (1947)
- Toots' Quartet – "Michigan" / "High School Cadets" – Omega 21.559 – (1951)
- Bob Scholte – "Liev'ling Ik Hou Alleen Van Jou" / "In De Cafetaria Van Milano" – Omega 21.137 – (1953)
- The Mena Moeria Minstrels – "Ticklin' The Strings" / "Pua Jka Lani" – Omega 35.112 – (1953)
- [(Ink Spots)] – "It's Funny to Everyone but Me" – Omega 61.050 – (1956)
- Bill Haley & His Comets – "R-O-C-K" / "The Saints Rock 'N Roll" – Omega 61.055 – (1956)
- Bill Haley & His Comets – "Rip It Up" / "Teenagers Mother" (Are You Right?) – Omega 61.069 – (1956)

== 7" singles catalogue (selective) ==
Singles

- Mena Moeria Minstrels, Hawaiian Quintet O.l.v. Rudi Wairata – "Maka-Lapua" / "Drowsy Waters" (Wailana Waltz) – Omega 9.35.150 – (1954)
- R.K. Jeugdcentralekoor – "Orgelliedje" / "De Nachtegaal" – Omega 9.35.200 – (1956)
- R.K. Jeugdcentralekoor – "Ons Brabant" / "Holland" – Omega 9.35.222 – (1956)
- Bill Haley & His Comets – "Hot Dog Buddy Buddy" / "Rockin' Through The Rye" – Omega 9.61.060 – (1956)
- Bill Haley & His Comets – "Teenager's Mother (Are You Right?) / "Rip It Up" – Omega 9.61.069 – (1956)
- Ben Cramer – "Zai Zai Zai" / "Now The Song Is Over" – Omega 35.832 – (1967)
- Ben Cramer – "There's A Fine Place" / "Highest Mountain" – Omega 36.453 – (1968)
- Ben Cramer – "Dreams Never Come True" / "I Can't Let You Go" – Omega 35.875 – (1958)

Extended play

- The Mena Moeria Minstrels* O.l.v Ming Luhulima, Solo guitar: Coy Pereira – Marching With The Mena Moeria Minstrels
  " Waikiki Beach March ", "Bongo March" / "Polynesian March", "Maori March" – Omega 145.559 – (1962)
- Carl Frei – Orgel – Oklahoma
  "Oklahoma" "The Surrey With The Fringe On Top", "Oh, What a Beautiful Mornin'" / "All Or Nothin'", "People Will Say We're In Love", "Out Of My Dreams" – Omega 35.351 – (1962)

== Album catalogue (selective) ==
- Pete Felleman – Presenteert: Jazz At The Kurhaus Volume I – Omega 33.101 – (1953)
