= Ming Luhulima =

Indonesian musician

- Also known as: Lou Lima
- Born: Sanana, Indonesia
- Genres: Indonesian indie
- Occupation: Musician
- Instruments: Vocals, guitar, ukulele
- Years active: 1950s - ?
- Labels: CID, Dureco, Omega

Ming Luhulima, also known as Lou Lima, was a Netherlands-based recording artist originally from the Maluku Islands, which were part of the Dutch East Indies. He was closely associated with Rudi Wairata during his career. Luhulima was a member of the Amboina Serenaders and the Mena Moeria Minstrels, and also led the Krontjong Ensemble Pantja Warna.

== Background ==
Luhulima, a Moluccan musician became a well-known artist in the Netherlands, and like George de Fretes had gained fame there. In addition to being a singer, he also played guitar and ukulele. Along with George de Fretes, he was responsible for the promotion of the Portuguese style or genre of music in the Netherlands called Kroncong.

== Career ==
=== 1950s ===
One of the groups Luhulima was in was the Netherlands-based Mena Muria Minstrels. This group was formed by Rudi Wairata and featured Joyce Aubrey the ex-wife of George De Fretes. Another group he was in was The Amboina Serenaders. By 1953, the line up was Jack Salakory, Rudi Wairata, Joyce Aubrey, Luhulima and Joop Sahanaya. The serenaders, previously called The Mena Moeria Minstrels had lost Rudi Wairata due to a disagreement within the group. That year Luhulima became the leader. In 1958, he covered Harry Belafonte's "Island In The Sun" released as "Eiland In De Zon" bw "Conjo".

=== 1960s ===
In 1962, Omega released a single "Polynesian March" bw "Maori March" by the Mena Moeria Minstrels. The A-side "Polynesian March" was his composition. Two of his compositions "Hula Hula" bw "Aloha Honolulu" were recorded by Die Wicky-Wackys and released on the Polydor label in 1963. In 1968, the Ming Luhulima, Krontjong Ensemble Pantja Warna album was released on the Dureco label and featured three compositions by Luhulima, "Asmara-Murni", "Suami-Istri" and "Suara Baru". Before that release, another EP by Krontjong Ensemble "Pantja Warna" featured both Luhulima and Sylvia van Renesse on vocals.

== Discography (solo) ==
=== Singles ===
As Lou Lima

- "Makan-patita" / "Aan de baai van Ambon" - CID 48 156 - (1957).
- "Jij bent voor mij..." / "Afscheid van Jamaica" - CID 48 169 - (1957).
- "Eiland In De Zon" (Island In The Sun) / "Conjo" - CID 48.174 - (1957).
- "Vooruit" / "Het lied van Nieuw-Guinea" - CID 48 177 - (1957).
- "Spreken is zilver" / "O Christien" - Omega 35 299 - (1961).

=== Extended play ===
As Lou Lima

- "Eiland in de zon", "Conjo" / "Aan de baai van Ambon", "Makan-patita" - CID 75 891 - (1958).

=== Albums (compact discs) ===
As Ming Luhulima

- Een weerzien met Ming Luhulima - Dureco 1155742 (HAX0360) - (1991).

== Discography (with group) ==
=== Albums (LPs) ===
- Ming Luhulima And His Amboina Serenaders - Ming Luhulima And His Amboina Serenaders - Dureco – 51.005.
- Ming Luhilima and his Amboina Serenaders - The Amboina Serenaders - GIP 2L 51.015/16 - (1967).
- Krontjong Ensemble Pantja Warna o.l.v. Ming Luhulima - Krontjong Ensemble Pantja Warna* o.l.v. Ming Luhulima - Dureco 51.014 - (1968).
