= Dureco =

Dutch record label

- Parent company: Strengholt Music Group
- Founded: 1952
- Founder: The Pelgrims Group
- Status: Active
- Genre: Various
- Country of origin: Netherlands
- Official website: www.dureco.nl

Dureco is a Dutch independent record label based in the Netherlands. Over the years many artists and groups such as the Amboina Serenaders, Judy Cheeks, Jules de Corte, De Dijk, Jef Elbers, Gotcha!, Samantha Jones, Ming Luhulima, the Mena Moeria Minstrels, Liz Mitchell, Julian Sas, Luv', Roger Peterson and Rene van Helsdingen have had their work released through Dureco.

== Background ==
It was founded in 1952 as the Dutch division of the Pelgrims Group. It also had divisions in Belgium and France.

By the early 1970s, it was selling 36 million records a year. Through its Sofrason company in France it was selling 22 million records and through Fonior in Belgium, it was selling 8 million. By 1972, it had its own 24-track studio. Its pressing plant had nine album pressing machines with a capacity to press 100,000 albums per week. They also had the capacity to press 100,000 singles per week with three double single pressing machines. At that time it had a staff of 110.

By 1980, the Belgian division which was started by Eddie Palmans had since gone into liquidation.

It handled the distribution for Omega, another Netherlands based record label.

Today, it is owned by the Dutch independent music publisher Strengholt Music Group.
