= Joyce Aubrey =

- Born: Indonesia
- Genres: Rock' Roll, Indonesian folk, Malayan folk

Joyce Aubrey was a singer and recording artist who was popular in the Netherlands in the 1960s as part of the duo Wanda & Joyce. She is also the mother of singer Wanda de Fretes as well as the ex-wife of legendary steel guitarist George de Fretes. In addition to her solo efforts, she also recorded with George de Fretes and the Amboina Serenaders, a popular Netherlands based band whose members included Ming Luhulima and Rudi Wairata. Some of their songs did well in Germany as well.

== Background ==
Joyce Aubrey was an Indonesian singer who married musician George de Fretes. Together they had a daughter Wanda who was born in Indonesia in 1946. In later years Wanda would become a recording artist. By 1952, she had divorced George de Fretes and she took her daughter to the Netherlands. Some ten years later she and her daughter were living in the Hague. Later Aubrey married bassist Fred Hoogduin.

== Career ==
In the late 1950s she was the singer for the band the Mena Moeria Minstrels, that included Ming Luhulima. She was a member of the Amboina Serenaders which included Rudi Wairata. Their earliest recordings were released on 78 RPM discs. In 1958, Jan de Winter who was a producer for Phonogram Records in the Netherlands invited her ex-husband George to a recording session at a studio in Hilversum. At the session which included Aubrey and her ex-husband, they recorded Krontjong songs. One of the songs from the session was "Sarina".

In the early 1960s she had recorded some solo singles. One was "Heimwee naar Soerabaja" bw "'n Droomschilderij" which was released on the Fontana label in 1961. The following year she had another which was "Carolina Melodie" bw "Cowboy Jimmy Jo" also by Fontana.

Along with her daughter Wanda, she gained popularity in the Netherlands, singing Mayalan songs. An EP record containing the songs "Ajoen", "Si Patokaan", "Rasa Sajang" and "Koleh" was released on the Fontana label. In 1964 an EP by the pair was released on Fontana. It included "Tari piring kaparinyo", "Tari paying", "Timang si buyung" and "Dayung-dayung ".

She was reputed to be an excellent steel guitar player herself but no recordings have been made of her playing the instrument.

== Discography Joyce Aubrey ==
=== Singles ===
- "Heimwee naar Soerabaja" / "'n Droomschilderij" - Fontana TF 266 118 - (1960)
- "Carolina melodie" / "Cowboy Jimmy Jo" - Fontana TF 266 214 - (1961)

== Discography Wanda & Joyce ==
=== Singles ===
- "Ajun Ajun" / "Es Gibt Ein Wunderland" - Fontana TF 266 394
- "Hula Serenade" / "Ik Ken Een Sprookjesland" - Fontana TF 266 403 - (1962)
- "Zwei Braune Hawaiianos" / "Loahe" - Fontana TF 266 420 - (1963)

With the Rhythm Brothers

- "Ajoen Ajoen" / "Koleh Koleh" - Fontana TF 266 336 - (1962)
- "Patokaan" / "Rasa Sajang Keneh" - Fontana TF 266 337 - (1962)
- "Oleh Oleh Bandung" / "Rasa Sajang" - Fontana TF 266.338 - (1962)
- "Mari Njong Berami Ramai" / "Potong Padi" - Fontana TF 266 339 - (1962)

With Jack Bulterman

- "Tari Payung" / "Tari Piring Kaparinyo" - Fontana TF 266 452 - (1964)
- "Timang Si Buyung" / "Dayung-Dayung" - Fontana TF 266 453 - (1964)

=== Extended play ===
With The Rhythm Brothers

- Wanda & Joyce Vol. 1 - "Ajoen Ajoen", "Patokaan" / "Rasa Sajang Keneh", "Koleh Koleh" - Fontana TE 463 269 - (1962)
- Wanda & Joyce Vol. 2 - "Oleh Oleh Bandung", "Mari Njong Beramai Ramai" / "Rasa Sajang Keneh", "Potong Padi" - Fontana TE 463 270 - (1963)

With Jack Bulterman

- Tari Piring Kaparinyo - "Tari Piring Kaparinyo", "Tari Payung" / "Timang Si Buyung", "Dayung-Dayung" - Fontana TE 463 297 - (1964)

== Discography Joyce Aubrey with other artists ==
=== Singles ===
George de Fretes en zijn Royal Hawaiian Minstrels & Joyce Aubrey

- "Mooi Hawaii" / "Daarginds in Waikiki" - Decca FM 264 257 - (1959)

George De Fretes en zijn Suara Istana met zang van Joyce Aubrey en Bill Toma

- "Sarna" / "Schoon Ver Van U" - Decca FM 264 214 - (1958)
- "Ajoen, Ajoen" / "Eiland Ambon" - Decca FM 264 230 - (1959)

=== Extended play ===
George De Fretes en zijn Suara Istana met zang van Joyce Aubrey en Bill Toma

- "Mutiara", "Bengawan Solo" / "Terkenang Tanah Air" / "Krontjong Moritzko" - Decca V 63034 - (1958)
