= Mena Moeria Minstrels =

The Mena Moeria Minstrels were a popular Netherlands based Hawaiian music group. They were made up of mainly Moluccans from the former Dutch East Indies colony. The group was originally led by steel guitarist Rudi Wairata and also featured Joyce Aubrey and Ming Luhulima. They were prolific in their output releasing at least twenty singles in the 1950s.

== Background ==
The Mena Moeria Minstrels, like their sister group the Amboina Serenaders were under the umbrella of Rudi Wairata. They were in the Hawaiian music bag. In 1951, the line up consisted of Rudi Wairata, Ming Luhulima, Charlie Kuipers, Pariury and Patty. Around 1952, Joyce Aubrey joined the group. Guitarist Joop Sahanaya, a cousin of Wairata also joined. In addition to them, the act also included some dancing hula girls.

In 1953, Wairata was able to get a recording contract from Dureco. The way they interpreted Hawaiian music had the interest of the record company.

Having found success with the Mena Moeria Minstrels, Wairata started up another group, the Amboina Serenaders. This group basically had the same line up of members as the Minstrels with the exception of an extra member who played the vibraphone.

Around 1957, a disagreement within the group developed, which resulted in the departure of Wairata. His departure also affected the Amboina Serenaders. This resulted in Luhulima being leader of both groups. In 1958, Aubrey left the band to join her ex-husbands group, the Royal Hawaiian Minstrels.

In 1962, under the obvious leadership of Ming Luhulima, an EP was issued on the Omega label with all compositions by Luhulima. The tracks were "Waikiki Beach March", "Bongo March", "Polynesian March" and "Maori March". It also featured Coy Pereira on steel guitar.

== Later years ==
Founding member Rudi Wairata died in 1981. The following year "Ola Bapa Dja" bw "Goro Goro Né was re released on Non records.

== Members ==
- Rudi Wairata - guitar - (1951-57)
- Ming Luhulima (a.k.a. Lou Lima) - vocals, ukulele - (1951 - ?)
- Jack Salakory - bass
- Rudi Severijns - bass
- Charlie Kuipers
- Joyce Aubrey - vocals, (1952-1958)
- Joop Sahanaya - Guitar - (1952 - ?)
- Pariury - (1951 - 1952)
- Patty - (1951 - 1952)

== Discography ==
=== Singles ===
- "Tomi Tomi" / "Na Aloe" - Omega 35 111 - (1953)
- "Ticklin' The Strings" / "Pua Jka Lani" - Omega 35 112 -(1953)
- "Hano Hano Hanalei" / The Royal Hawaiian Hula" - Omega 35 118 - (1953)
- "Kane Ohe Hula" / "Little Lani Lo" - Omega 35 119 - (1953)
- "Hilo March" / "Kolo Pa" - Omega 35 133 - (1953)
- "Maui No Laka Oi" / "Uhe Uhene" - Omega 35 134 - (1953)
- "Kaiwahu March" / "No Hiwi E" - Omega 35 149 - (1954)
- "Drowsy Waters" / "Maka Lapua" - Omega 35 150 - (1954)
- "Honolulu March" / "Blue Bahamas" - Omega 35 163 - (1954)
- "Sylvery Moon And Golden Sands / "Ke-Ka-Ipo" - Omega 35 164 - (1954)
- "Kaimana Hila" / "Fascinating Rhythm" - Omega 35 178 - (1955)
- "Be Mine, Sweetheart, Be Mine" / "Manuella Boy" - Omega 35 179 - (1955)
- "Kokohi" / "Maui Moon" - Omega 35 183 - (1955)
- "Sapphire Of The Tropics" / "Kaulana O Hilo Hanakahi" - Omega 35 184 - (1955)
- "Hawaiian Lei Of love" / "Hula Girl" - Omega 35 194 - (1956)
- "Sophisticated Hula" / "Lovely Hula Girl" - Omega 35 195 - (1956)
- "Beautiful Kohana" / "Maui Girl" - Omega 35 201 - (1956)
- "Ula Hua Walé Aoe" / "The Beauty Hula" - Omega 35 202 - (1956)
- "Honolulu Rock A Aoll A" / "Allegheny Moon" - Omega 35 215 - (1956)
- "Hula A Pae" / "He U'i" - Omega 35 216 - (1956)
- "Bongo March" / "Waikiki Beach March" - Omega 35 339 - (1962)
- "Polynesian March" / "Maori March" - Omega 35 340 - (1962)
- "Waikiki March" / Polynesian March" - Metronome M 306 - (1962) (As the Mena Minstrels)
- "Ambon March" / "Tahiti March" - Omega 35 384 - (1963)
- "Hawaii March" / "Samoa March" - Omega 35 385 - (1963)
- "Ola Bapa Dja (O Zeg, Hallo)" / "Goro Goro Né (Breng Mijn Jas Terug)" - Non 034 - (1982)

=== Extended play ===
- Rudi Wairata & his Mena Moeria Minstrels
  Hawaiian melodies vol. 1 - "Hilo March", "Pua Jka Lani" / "Hano Hano Hanalei", "Uhe Uhene" - Omega 145 506 - (1955)
- Rudi Wairata & his Mena Moeria Minstrels
  Hawaiian melodies vol. 2 - "Kaiwahu March", "No Hiwi E" / "The Royal Hawaiian Hula", "Drowsy Waters" - Omega 145 507 - (1955)
- Rudi Wairata & his Mena Moeria Minstrels
  Hawaiian melodies vol. 3 - "Honolulu March", "Silvery Moon And golden Sands" / "Ticklin' The Strings", "Tomi Tomi" - Omega 145 508 - (1955)
- "Beyond the reef", "Na Moku Eha" / "The One Rose", "Orange grove of California" - Omega 145 526 - (1956)
- Marching with the Mena Moeria Minstrels - "Waikiki Beach March", "Bongo March" / "Polynesian March", "Maori March" - Omega 145 559 - (1962)
- "Hawaiian Sunrise", Beautiful Aloha Beach" / "Magic Moon", South Sea Breeze" - Omega 145 562 - (1963)
- The Honolulu Hawaiians & Mena Moeria Minstrels
  Hawaii & Krontjong No. 1 - "Sarina", "Hawaii March" / "Toean Dan Njonja", "Samoa March" - Fono Disc 1043 - (1964)
- The Honolulu Hawaiians & Mena Moeria Minstrels
  Hawaii & Krontjong No. 2 - "Ambon March", "Goro Goro Ne" / "Ola Bapa Dja", "Tahiti March" - Fono Disc 1047 -(1964)

=== Albums ===
The Mena Moeria Minstrels

- Beautiful Hawaii - Dureco 51.002 - (1962)
- Waikiki Welcome - Dureco 51.055 - (196?)
- The Mena Moeria Minstrels - Dureco 51.070 - (1965)
- With Love From...Rudi Wairata & His Mena Moeria Minstrels - Capri CA 32-G - (1972)
- Love And Music From ... Hawaii - Capri CA 161 - (Circa 1974)
- Lovely Hula Girl - Maple MA-1003 - (1974)

The Mena Minstrels

- Mahalo Nui Hawaii - Dureco 8904 - (1963)
