= George de Fretes =

- Born: 23 December 1921; Bandung, Dutch East Indies
- Died: 19 November 1981 (aged 59) Los Angeles County, California, US
- Genres: Hawaiian music
- Occupation: Music
- Instrument: Steel guitar

George de Fretes (1921-1981) was a musician from Indonesia who found fame in the Netherlands. Like his fellow countrymen Ming Luhulima and Rudi Wairata, he found sizable popularity in the Netherlands and Europe playing Hawaiian music.

== Background ==
Originally from the Maluku Islands, Indonesia, De Fretes was born 23 December 1921 in Bandung. He was married to Joyce Aubrey and together they had a daughter Wanda, who was born in Bandung, Indonesia in 1946 and became a recording artist, like her musical parents. By 1952, de Fretes and Aubrey had divorced and she had moved to the Netherlands, taking their daughter Wanda with her. Aubrey joined The Mena Moeria Minstrels as their singer. The group was headed by Ming Luhulima. It is believed that de Fretes stowed away on a ship called the Johan van Oldenbarnevelt and arrived in the Netherlands around 1958.

=== Death ===
De Fretes died on 19 November 1981. He is buried next to his idol Sol Hoʻopiʻi.

== Career ==
De Fretes was a multi instrumentalist. In addition to the steel guitar, he also played guitar, violin, trumpet and saxophone. He became a popular artist in the Netherlands, and like Luhulima, gained his fame there. Along with Luhulima he was responsible for the Portuguese style or genre of music in the Netherlands called Kroncong becoming well known. He is also credited with teaching Rudi Wairata techniques on the steel guitar.

In 1960, he released an EP record on the Fontana label that featured the song "Ou' OelateZ". The record also featured Joyce Aubrey and Bill Toma on vocals. In 1966, he joined the Tielman Brothers and went on tour with them. He also recorded an album with Frank Valdor in 1966. Later he left to settle in the United States permanently. Around 1970 or 1971, Hula Girl was released on the Eclipse label. This was a re-release of an earlier album, Aloha Keakua that was released on the Omega label.

In September 2010, his daughter Wanda took a trip from California to the third Chanos International Steel Guitar Festival aka CISGF which was held in Chanos-Curson, France, to receive a posthumous European Steel Guitar Hall of Fame award for her father.

== LP Discography ==
George de Fretes albums
Act	Title	Release info	Year	F	Notes
George de Fretes	George De Fretes	Decca SLQ 25000		10" LP	
George de Fretes En Zijn Krontjong-orkest	Indonesian Folklore	Decca XBY 846 519		LP	
George de Fretes	Heimwee Naar Insulinde	Decca	1988	CD	German release

The Royal Hawaiian Minstrels albums
Act	Title	Release info	Year	F	Notes
George de Fretes & His Royal Hawaiian Minstrels	Hawaiian Paradise	Decca – NP 356 001		LP	
George de Fretes and his Royal Hawaiian Minstrels	Aloha Keakoa	Omega 333 075		LP	
Royal Hawaiian Minstrels O.l.v. George de Fretes met zang van: Wanda, Sita en de Samoa Voices	Royal Hawaiian Minstrels O.l.v. George de Fretes met zang van: Wanda, Sita en de Samoa Voices	Iris Records 15042		LP	
George de Fretes And The South-Sea-Melodians	Island In The Sun; Hawaiian-Klänge Mit George De Fretes And The South-Sea-Melodians	Tip 633 147		LP	Royal Hawaiian Minstrels aka South Sea Melodians
The Royal Hawaiian Minstrels Conducted by George de Fretes With The Samoa Voices	Beautiful Hawaii: The Most Beautiful Hawaiian Songs	PMF Records 90 533-2	1991	CD	

George de Fretes En Zijn Suara Istana albums
Act	Title	Release info	Year	F	Notes
George de Fretes En Zijn Suara Istana	Heimwee Naar Insulinde	Decca 625 372 QL	1976	LP	
