= Coy Pereira =

- Born: October 22, 1919; Batavia, Dutch East Indies
- Died: April 12, 2005 (aged 85) Rotterdam ?
- Genres: Hawaiian music
- Occupation: Musician
- Instruments: Steel guitar, guitar
- Years active: 1933 - 1990s

Coy Pereira (1919-2005) was a Netherlands-based guitarist and steel guitarist originally from Batavia in the Dutch East Indies. He was a member of the Kilima Hawaiians and had recorded with the Mena Moeria Minstrels as well as having work released under his own name. He is said to be in the same class of fellow steel guitarists, George de Fretes and Rudi Wairata.

== Biography ==
Pereira was born on October 22, 1919, in Batavia. He started playing at age 13. He and his wife Hetty had three children. In 1960, he moved to the Netherlands.

In later years he and his wife moved to a retirement village in a Rotterdam suburb. He died in hospital on April 12, 2005, aged 86.

His daughter Rosy born 1951 is a recording artist, having recorded in the 1970s and 1980s. His son Richard was a guitarist with the a Dutch group called The Thunderbolts.

== Career ==
Around 1933, while in his teens in the Dutch East Indies, he was playing Hawaiian steel guitar in bands such as the Hawaiian Big Boys, the Hula Players and the Aloha Players. Around 1945, he was in bands such as the Candy Rhythmics, Manuella Boys, the Hawaiian Novalties and Pemuda Meluka. He also played in a Crontjong music band called Ramé Dendang.

In 1960, he came to the Netherlands. Not long after he arrived, he was contacted by Bill Buysman of the Kilima Hawaiians. Having just lost Rudi Wairata, he invited Pereira to join the group. He stayed with the group for a while and made some recordings with them. Later he left to find work in a Rotterdam office and was replaced by steel guitarist Frans Doolaard.

In 1962, he contributed steel guitar to recordings by the now Ming Luhulima led Mena Moeria Minstrels which ended up on their Marching With The Mena Moeria Minstrels extended play. These included "Waikiki Beach March" and "Polynesian March". These were from two previous singles the group had recorded. He also played on their "Ambon March" / "Tahiti March" single which was released in 1963.

Around 1967, he rejoined the Kilima Hawaiians. His album Sentimental Steel Guitarist of The Kilima Hawaiians released on Maple in 1981 included songs such as "Hula Blues", "Ina Ne Keke", "Blue Hawaii" and "I'm Getting Sentimental Over You". Over the years, he stayed with the Kilima Hawaiians while balancing his administration job. He was still playing with the group even after he retired.

== Coy Pereira discography ==
=== LP albums ===
- Wanda, Coy Pereira - Krontjong Herinneringen II - Polydor – 236 806
- Coy Pereira with the Kilima Hawaiians - Sentimental Steel Guitarist Of The Kilima Hawaiians - Sweet Sweet Steel Guitar Series – No. 9 - Maple MA-1009 - (1981)

=== CD albums ===
- Coy Pereira - Golden Collection Coy Pereira - Guitar - Koch International 322 847
- Coy Pereira - Golden Collection Coy Pereira - Steel guitar - Hotline 480.0122 - (1988)
- Frans Doolaard, Coy Pereira, Frans van Oirschot - Steelguitars in Love - CNR 100.216 - (1988)
- Coy Pereira All Time Favourites Steelguitar DGR - (2009)

== Various artist compilation ==
=== CD albums ===
- Golden Collection Sampler - CNR 480.041-2 – (1992) Track: "Save the Last Dance for Me"

== Appears on ==
=== Singles ===
- The Mena Moeria Minstrels - "Polynesian March" / "Maori March" - Omega 35.340 - (1962)

& The Mena Moeria Minstrels - "Ambon March" / "Tahiti March" - Omega 35.384 - (1962)

- The Mena Moeria Minstrels - "Hawaii March" / "Samoa March" - Omega 35.385 - (1962)

=== Extended play ===
- The Mena Moeria Minstrels o.l.v. Ming Luhulima - Sologitaar: Coy Pereira - Marching With The Mena Moeria Minstrels
  "Waikiki Beach March", "Bongo March" / "Polynesian March", "Maori March" - Omega 145.559 - (1962)

=== LP albums ===
- The Kilima Hawaiians - Rhythm Of The Islands - CBS S 52525 - (1968)
- The Kilima Hawaiians - Tropical Breeze - CBS S 52685 - (1969)
- The Kilima Hawaiians - Hawaii Tattoo - CBS S 52802 - (1970)
- The Kilima Hawaiians - De Roos Van Honolulu - CBS S 53042 - (1973) (compilation)
- De Kilima Hawaiians - 14 Krontjong Liedjes - Artone BDJ S-1629 - (1974)
- Kilima's - De Stille Kracht Van 40 Jaar Kilima's, 14 Krontjong Melodiën - Golden Lion Records V 15005 - (1976)
- The Kilima Hawaiians - Golden Greats Of The Kilima Hawaiians - Bovema Negram 5N 028-26155 - (1979)
- The Kilima Hawaiians - The Best Of The Kilima Hawaiians - Music For Pleasure 1A022-58005 - (1980)

=== CD albums ===
- The Kilima Hawaiians - Rhythm Of The Islands & Hawaii Tattoo - CBS CBS 462641 2 - (1989)

== Writing and arrangement ==
=== LP album ===
& The Kalua's - Hawaiian Hits - GIP – 33.042, Dureco – 33.042 - (1970) - Arrangement on tracks: "Mountain Song", "Heavenly Island"

=== Compact disc album ===
- Kilima Hawaiians - Royal Hawaiian Minstrels - BSP 507, BSP 9202 - Composer on track: "Koleh Koleh"
