= Rosy & Andres =

Dutch musical duo

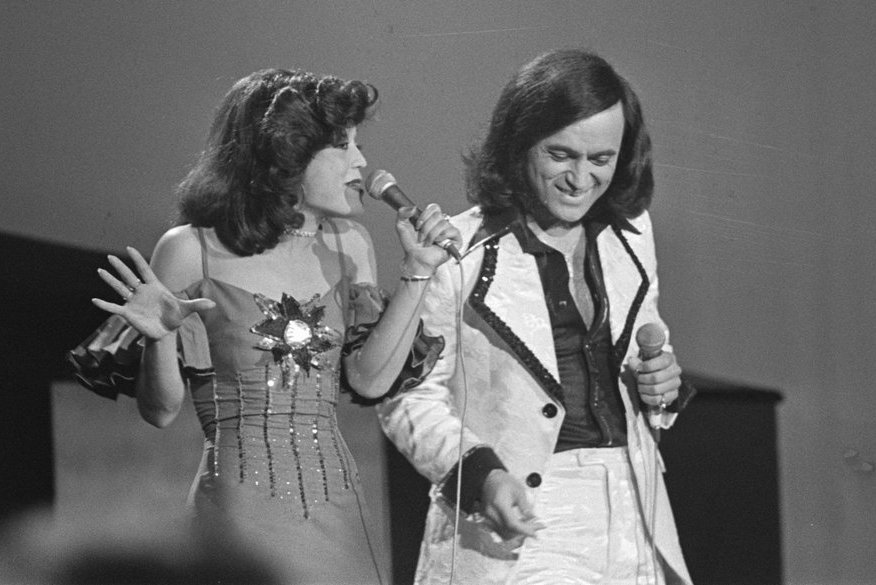
- Nationaal Songfestival 1976 - Rosy & Andres.

Background information
- Origin: Netherlands
- Genres: Pop music
- Years active: 1975 - 1977
- Labels: CNR Records
- Past members: Rosy Pereira, Andreas Dries Holten

Rosy & Andres were a Dutch musical duo made up of Rosy Pereira and Dries Holten. They recorded together from the mid to late 1970s. Their best known song is "My Love".

== History ==
Rosy Pereira was born in 1951 and is the daughter of steel guitarist Coy Pereira. Andres is a Dutch singer-songwriter of Indonesian descent. In 1972, he represented the Netherlands at the 1972 Eurovision Song Contest.

=== 1976 ===
In the October 9, 1976 issue of Billboard, their single "My Love" reached position no 3 in the Dutch chart, just behind "In Zaire" by Johnny Wakelin and with "Dancing Queen" by ABBA at no 1. By October 23, 1976, their single "My Love" had dropped to no 8 in the Dutch chart. It was announced in a November 1976 issue of Billboard that they along with the Dutch Swing College Band, Jules de Corte and others had recorded for a fund raising album for the Dutch Heart Foundation, due for release on the 11th of November.

=== 1977 ===
While on the Eddie Becker Television Show, they were awarded a gold disc for their My Love album which was their debut album. In early June, 1977, "My Love" was no 9 in the Swiss Top Ten. Previously in late April that year, it was at no 5 in the Swiss chart. Later in June of that year, they along with singers Therese Steinmetz and Conny Vink and a violin duo made up of Sem Vijveen & Benny Behr were sent to Romania for a five-day visit. Rosy and Andres were to sing a song in Romanian. The song "Bucaresti" was originally "Sausilito", a Dutch Top Ten hit from 1975. In late 1977, they along with Camel, ZZ Top and other Teldec international acts were given massive promotion via the press and television spectaculars.

== Discography ==
=== Singles ===
- "Sausilito" / "Dance Dance" - CNR 141 317 - (1976)
- "Sausalito" / " Tanz, Tanz, Tanz - Telefunken 6 11796 - (1976)
- "I Was Born To Love" / "Why Don't You Phone Me" - CNR 141 326 - (1976)
- "My Love" / "I Wanna Be Your baby" - CNR 141 351 - (1976)
- "My Love" / "Vielleicht Noch Fünf Minuten" - Telefunken 6 11997 - (1976)
- "I Believe In You" / "Walt Disney's Wonderworld" - CNR 141 392 - (1977)
- "Save Me" / Kiss Me On The Phone" - CNR 141 415 - (1977)
- "I'd Rather Be Sorry" / Sing Me Another Lovesong" - CNR 141 433 - (1977)
- "Zwei Wie Du Und Ich" / "Wir Spielen Katz Uns Maus" - Telefunken 6 12090 - (1977)

=== Albums ===
- My Love - CNR 657 529 - (1976)
- Come Closer - CNR 660.015 - (197?)
- 16 Gouden Successen - CNR – 541.664 - (1978)
- Pasar Malam Souvenirs - Discount Music DCCD 20010 - (2000)
