= 20 bästa =

Compilation album by Elisabeth Andreassen
- Released: 1998
- Recorded: 1981–1986

Elisabeth Andreassen chronology
Så skimrande var aldrig havet (1997)	20 bästa (1998)	Kjærlighetsviser (2001)

20 bästa is a 1998 compilation album by Norwegian singer Elisabeth Andreassen.

== Track listing ==
1. Morning Train
2. La det swinge – Bobbysocks
3. Together Again
4. Sommar Reggae (Sunshine Reggae)
5. Waiting for the Morning – Bobbysocks
6. Gå nu
7. Håll mig hårt – duet with Jan Andreasson
8. Om jag lyssnar
9. Take Me Away
10. Stjärnhimmel
11. Lipstick on Your Collar
12. Killen ner' på Konsum svär att han är Elvis (There's a Guy Works down the Chip Shop Swears He's Elvis)
13. Då lyser en sol
14. Dreamer
15. När jag behövde dig mest (Just When I Needed You Most)
16. Se på mej jag flyger
17. I'm a Woman
18. In My Dreams – duet with Mats Rådberg
19. Operator
20. Angel of the Morning
