= Walkin' on Air =

Studio album by Bobbysocks
- Released: 1987
- Recorded: Baby 'O, Ocean Way, Sound City, Mad Hatter, Take One and Red Zone Recording Studios - USA
- Genre: Pop
- Length: 43:51
- Label: Sonet
- Producer: Bill Maxwell

Bobbysocks chronology
Waiting for the Morning (1986)	Walkin' on Air (1987)

Walkin' on Air is a 1987 album from Norwegian pop duo Bobbysocks. Within four days, the album sold 50,000 copies, and was certified gold in Norway. It was to be the duo's final album.

The songs chosen as lead singles were "If I Fall" in Norway (peaking at Nº 5 on Norsktoppen) and "Don't Leave Me Here Without You" in Sweden. Aside "If I Fall", other album songs that made it into the Norsktoppen were "Daddy's Comin' Home" (Nº 7) and "I Believe in Love" (Nº 9).

The title track was written and originally recorded by Stephen Bishop for the film, The Boy Who Could Fly, released the previous year.

== Track listing ==
1. I Believe in Love
2. More than I Can Say
3. If I Fall
4. I Don't Speak the Language
5. Walkin' on Air
6. Daddy's Comin' Home
7. Don't Leave Me Here Without You - Elisabeth
8. I've Got Your Heart
9. When I See Your Eyes
10. Love Me Tonight - Hanne

== Charts ==
Chart (1987)	Peak position
Norway albums chart	16

== Certification ==
Region	Certification	Certified units/sales
Norway (IFPI Norway)	Gold	50,000
