= Bobby socks (disambiguation) =

Bobby socks or bobby sox, are a style of women's socks.

Bobby socks, or variants, may also refer to:

- Bobbysocks, a Norwegian pop duo
  - Bobbysocks! (album), 1984
- "Bobby Sox" (song), a 2024 song by Green Day

== See also ==
- Bobby-soxer, a member of a subculture of young women in the mid-to-late 1940s
- Bobby Soxer (singer), Burmese singer, songwriter, and actress
