= La det swinge =

1985 song by Bobbysocks!

Single by Bobbysocks!
- Language: Norwegian
- English title: "Let It Swing"
- Released: 1985
- Recorded: 1985
- Genre: Dansband; schlager
- Length: 2:50
- Label: Bahama
- Songwriter: Rolf Løvland
- Producer: Torgny Söderberg

Eurovision Song Contest 1985 entry
- Country: Norway
- Artists: Hanne Krogh; Elisabeth Andreassen
- As: Bobbysocks!
- Language: Norwegian
- Composer: Rolf Løvland
- Lyricist: Rolf Løvland
- Conductor: Terje Fjærn

Finals performance
- Final result: 1st
- Final points: 123

Entry chronology
- ◄ "Lenge leve livet" (1984)
- "Romeo" (1986) ►

Official performance video
- "La det swinge" on YouTube

"La det swinge" (Norwegian pronunciation: [lɑː də ˈsvɪ̂ŋːə]; "Let it swing") is a song recorded by the pop duo Bobbysocks! –Hanne Krogh and Elisabeth Andreassen– with music composed and Norwegian lyrics written by Rolf Løvland. It represented Norway in the Eurovision Song Contest 1985 held in Gothenburg, resulting in the country's first ever win at the contest.

They released the song in the same single with its English version titled "Let It Swing". Following its win, it peaked at number one in the Norwegian and Belgian singles chart, and entered the charts in various countries, including Denmark, Sweden, Switzerland, Austria, Ireland, and the United Kingdom.

== Background ==
=== Conception ===
"La det swinge" was written –music and Norwegian lyrics– by Rolf Løvland. It is a tribute to dancing to old rock 'n' roll heard on the radio. Befitting the subject matter, the song itself is written in an old-fashioned style, with a memorable saxophone melody starting the song. The melody arrangement is in retro style, containing elements of contemporary 1980s music and throwbacks to the 1950s. A. Zandra wrote the lyrics for the English version of the song titled "Let It Swing".

Pop duo Bobbysocks! –Hanne Krogh and Elisabeth Andreassen– recorded both versions of the song and originally released them in the same single.

=== Eurovision ===
On 30 March 1985, "La det swinge" performed by Bobbysocks! competed in that year's edition of the Melodi Grand Prix, the national final organised by Norsk Rikskringkasting (NRK) to select its song and performer for the 30th edition of the Eurovision Song Contest. For their performances, they both appeared in sparkling, bright purple jackets, worn over black and white outfits; Krogh sported a black-and-white striped floor-length gown. The song won the competition so it became the Norwegian entrant for Eurovision.

On 4 May 1985, the Eurovision Song Contest was held at Scandinavium in Gothenburg hosted by Sveriges Television (SVT), and broadcast live throughout the continent. Bobbysocks! performed "La det swinge" thirteenth on the evening, following Italy's "Magic Oh Magic" by Al Bano and Romina Power and preceding the United Kingdom's "Love Is" by Vikki Watson. Terje Fjærn conducted the event's live orchestra in the performance of the Norwegian entry.

This was the second appearance for both Andreasson and Krogh in Eurovision: in 1982 Andreassen had represented Sweden in the duo Chips with Kikki Danielsson, singing "Dag efter dag"; and in 1971 Krogh had finished 17th –second from last– in the contest, with the song "Lykken er".

At the close of voting, it received 123 points, placing first in a field of nineteen, winning the contest. It became Norway's first ever win at the contest. It was succeeded as Norwegian entrant at the 1986 contest by "Romeo" by Ketil Stokkan.

=== Aftermath ===
Andreasson went on to Eurovision on two more occasions – she finished sixth in the 1994 contest, performing a duet with Jan Werner Danielsen, entitled simply, "Duett" and in the 1996 contest, she competed as a solo artist with "I evighet", finishing second to Ireland's "The Voice" by Eimear Quinn. Krogh competed in the 1991 contest as part of the group Just 4 Fun with "Mrs. Thompson", finishing 17th.

On 31 March 2015, Bobbysocks! performed "La det swinge" in the Eurovision sixtieth anniversary concert Eurovision Song Contest's Greatest Hits held in London.

== Track listing ==
1. "Let It Swing" – 2:50
2. "La det swinge" – 2:50

== Chart history ==
=== Weekly charts ===
"La det swinge"

Chart (1985)	Peak position
Sweden (Sverigetopplistan)	4

"Let It Swing"

Chart (1985)	Peak position
Austria (Ö3 Austria Top 40)	14
Belgium (Ultratop 50 Flanders)	1
Denmark (IFPI)	2
Ireland (IRMA)	8
Netherlands (Dutch Top 40)	13
Netherlands (Single Top 100)	9
Norway (VG-lista)	1
Switzerland (Schweizer Hitparade)	30
UK Singles (OCC)	44
West Germany (GfK)	47

Preceded by "Diggi-Loo Diggi-Ley" by Herreys	Eurovision Song Contest winners 1985	Succeeded by "J'aime la vie" by Sandra Kim
