= Waiting for the Morning =

Studio album by Bobbysocks
- Released: 14 April 1986
- Recorded: Park Studio and Sonet Studio 3 - Sweden
- Genre: Pop, AOR
- Length: 47:43 (CD) / 44:14 (LP and Cassette)
- Label: Sonet
- Producer: Svein Dag Hauge / Lars Kilevold / Eivind Rølles

Bobbysocks chronology
Bobbysocks (1984)	Waiting for the Morning (1986)	Walkin' on Air (1987)

Waiting for the Morning is a 1986 pop album by Norwegian pop duo Bobbysocks. One week before the release date the album had sold over 60,000 copies to record stores in Norway. Because of this, Elisabeth Andreasson and Hanne Krogh were awarded a Gold disc on the release date. By the end of 1987, the album was certified Platinum for its 100,000 copies sold in Norway. The album also charted in Sweden, receiving positive reviews and getting a Gold disc for its 25.000 copies sold in that country.

The title track was released in Europe as the lead single during 1986. In UK, West Germany and France it was released in a remixed version called "London Mix", made by the producer Kenny Denton, who also did an extended one released in West Germany. In 1988, the song was remixed again, this time adding some lines sung by a gospel singer, with the purpose to include it in an American film, directed by Lou Vadino. Only the film's promo video saw the light of day, as the movie was never shot. The remix remains unreleased up to date, and just a fragment of the last chorus was included on that promo.

"Johnny and the Dancing Girls" was released as a promo single in Norway, peaking at Nº 1 on Norsktoppen. Aside "Waiting for the Morning" and "Johnny and the Dancing Girls", other album songs that reached the Top 10 on Norsktoppen were "Mr. Moon" (Nº 4), "Is it Me Tonight" (Nº 6), and "Count Me Down" (Nº 7).

== Track listing ==
1. Johnny and the Dancing Girls
2. Mr Moon - Hanne
3. Heroes Never Die
4. Is It Me Tonight
5. Slow Emotion
6. Count Me Down (CD version only)
7. Night After Night
8. Waiting for the Morning
9. Where Did Our Love Go
10. Basic Love - Elisabeth
11. Hot in the City
12. Working Heart

== Charts ==
Album

Year	Chart	Position
1986	Norway's album chart	1
1986	Swedish album chart	50

Single

Year	Song	Chart	Position
1986	"Waiting for the Morning"	Norway's single chart	1
1986	"Waiting for the Morning"	Icelandic's single chart	2
