= The Teacher Who Was Not To Be =

Opera monologue about a teacher's journey

- Opera by Marcus Paus
- Librettist: Olav Anton Thommessen
- Language: Norwegian
- Premiere: 12 October 2013; Atrium of the University of Oslo during the Oslo Opera Festival

The Teacher Who Was Not To Be (Norwegian: Læreren som ikke ble) is an opera monologue by Marcus Paus and with a libretto by Olav Anton Thommessen from 2013. It premiered at the concert "Paus & Paus" with works by Marcus Paus and Ole Paus in the Atrium of the University of Oslo as part of the Oslo Opera Festival on 12 October 2013, with opera singer Knut Stiklestad in the role of the eponymous "Teacher." The work was included on the album Requiem/Trisyn/Læreren som ikke ble (2022) alongside the work Requiem by Marcus and Ole Paus. It was also featured in the first episode of the podcast series Paus og Castle blir kloke på musikklivet (Paus and Castle Figure Out Music Life) in 2021.

== Theme ==
The monologue is based on a letter written by professor of composition Olav Anton Thommessen to his erstwhile student Marcus Paus in 2006, shortly after Paus had presented some of his own works to the Norwegian Society of Composers where he had recently been admitted as a member. Thommessen, born in 1946, has been one of Norway's foremost modernist composers since the 1970s and is a proponent of atonal music. Paus, born in 1979, studied under Thommessen at the Norwegian Academy of Music from 1998 to 2003; as a young composer he became known for his focus on tradition, tonality and melody, and he has been an influential advocate of musical pluralism in Norway. Danny Riley notes that Paus is one of the "key musical figures in Norway’s modern compositional landscape" and argues that Paus's compositions might be seen as a reaction against older Norwegian contemporary composers, but that he is not a complete conservative. Paus said he felt compelled to rebel against older atonal modernist composers' prejudice against tonality around the turn of the century; over time Paus has come to be seen as an eclectic, lyrical modernist.

In his letter the 60-year old Thommessen chastised his 26-year old former student for his tonal music. A long monologue on why Paus has misunderstood everything about music ends with the words "I do not want any more verbal contact with you."

Dear Marcus! I write to you based on your presentation in the Norwegian Composers' Association, where you tried to act as a "breath of fresh air" in an environment that you believe has been led astray. It was insulting and pubertal. And I send you some of my own works (works that you haven't bothered to familiarise yourself with!). We are probably not that different, but that you did not let me teach you at all is a personal defeat for me. The attitudes that you demonstrated in your presentation show that you do not understand what it means to be a "creative" artist. [...] I don't want any more verbal contact with you.

— Olav Anton Thommessen, The Teacher Who Was Not To Be (2006)

The monologue has been described as emblematic of the generation gap among older modernist composers and the younger generation of composers, who are more open to pluralism. When the opera monologue premiered, the "Teacher" in the monologue remained anonymous. The monologue played an important role in an extensive debate on musical aesthetics in the music journal Ballade in 2015, during which the formerly anonymous "Teacher" was revealed by Paus to be Olav Anton Thommessen; the debate was described as "the biggest public debate about art music" in Norway since the 1970s.

The work was included on the album Requiem/Trisyn/Læreren som ikke ble (2022) alongside the work Requiem by Marcus and Ole Paus. The work was featured in the first episode of the podcast series Paus og Castle blir kloke på musikklivet (Paus and Castle Figure Out Music Life) in 2021, where Paus said it would be unthinkable for a professor to write that kind of letter to a young student today and that it illustrated how a tendency to authoritarianism used to be a problem in the musical world. Paus said he views the letter as an historical document and hopes Thommessen has a sense of humor about himself that allows him to appreciate the opera monologue, but added that "you do not write such a letter without being rather pompous by disposition."
