= Olav Anton Thommessen =

Norwegian contemporary composer (born 1946)

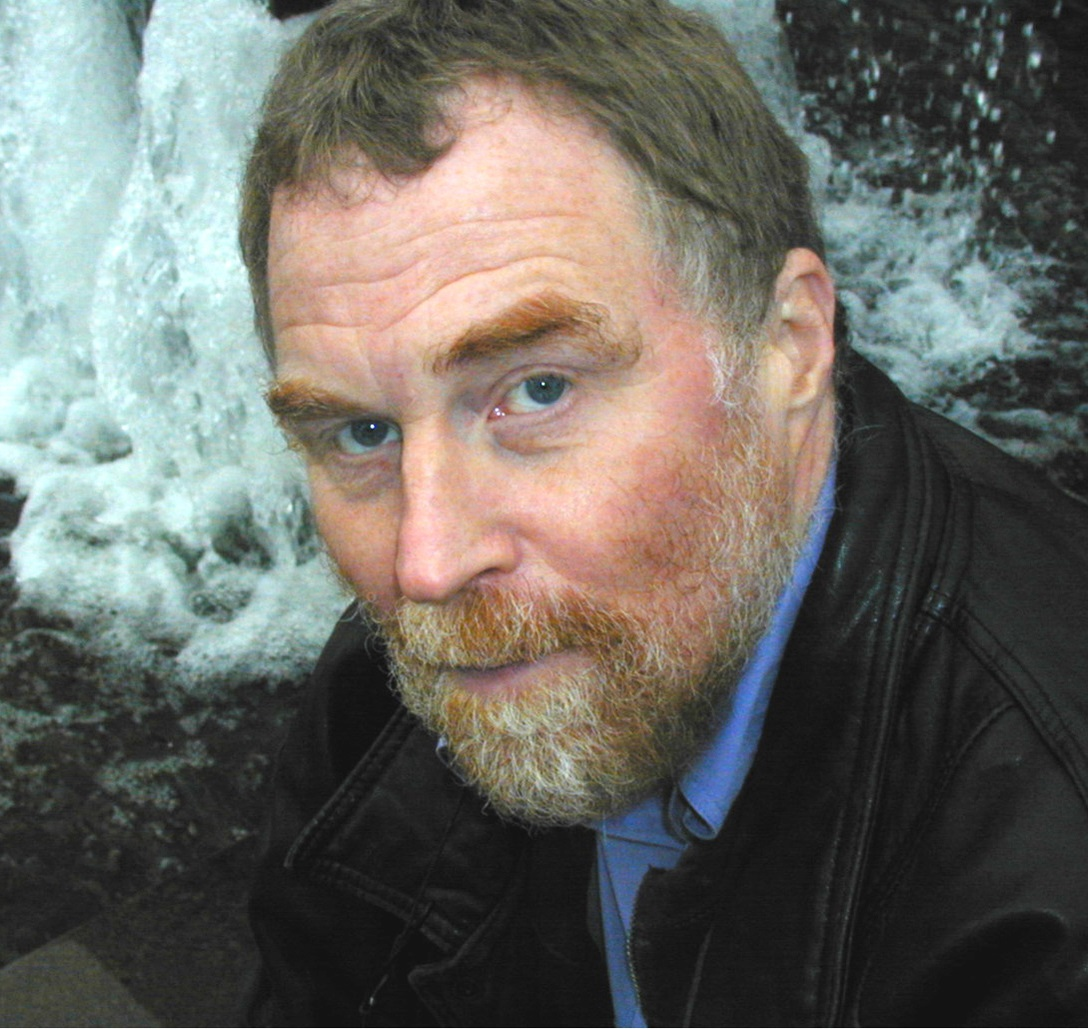
- Born: 16 May 1946 (age 80)
- Notable work: Et glassperlespill; The Teacher Who Was Not To Be

Olav Anton Thommessen (born 16 May 1946) is a Norwegian contemporary composer who has been one of the foremost modernist composers in Norway since the 1970s. His main compositions include Et glassperlespill and Gjennom Prisme. He was a professor of composition at the Norwegian Academy of Music until retiring in 2014, and has also been an influential figure in music education and music organisations in Norway. Thommessen has played a significant role in aesthetic discourse in Norway and is known for his modernist and atonal stance. In later life he has become known for engaging in a critical public dialogue with his former student Marcus Paus about the future of art music, that has resulted in the opera monologue The Teacher Who Was Not To Be with a libretto by Thommessen; a 2015 debate between the two was described as "the biggest public debate about art music" in Norway since the 1970s.

== Background ==
He is a son of the diplomat Knut Thommessen (né Knut Saenger), a grandson of the German gynecologist Hans Saenger and a great-grandson of the gynecologist Max Saenger (also spelled Sänger). He trained in the United States, earning degrees from Westminster Choir College and Indiana University School of Music with a bachelor of music in 1969. He is a former professor of composition at the Norwegian Academy of Music, where he was employed in 1972. He retired in 2014.

== Thommessen in aesthetic discourse ==
Thommessen has also been active in stylistic and aesthetic discourse and is regarded as a critic of non-modernist and tonal music. In addition to public debate, his stance on this matter has also led to compositional output by third parties: a 2006 letter he wrote to the then-26 year old composer Marcus Paus was years later utilized as the libretto for Paus' opera monologue The Teacher Who Was Not To Be, which premiered at the concert "Paus & Paus" (with works by Marcus Paus and Ole Paus) in the Atrium of the University of Oslo as part of Oslo Opera Festival in 2013. Thommessen was later identified by Paus as the previously anonymous librettist. The opera monologue was included on the album Requiem/Trisyn/Læreren som ikke ble (2022) alongside the work Requiem by Marcus and Ole Paus. It was also featured in the first episode of the podcast series Paus og Castle blir kloke på musikklivet (Paus and Castle Figure Out Music Life) in 2021. In the letter/libretto, Thommessen wrote:

Dear Marcus! I write to you based on your presentation in the Norwegian Composers' Association, where you tried to act as a "breath of fresh air" in an environment that you believe has been led astray. It was insulting and pubertal. And I send you some of my own works (works that you haven't bothered to familiarise yourself with!). We are probably not that different, but that you did not let me teach you at all is a personal defeat for me. The attitudes that you demonstrated in your presentation show that you do not understand what it means to be a "creative" artist. [...] I don't want any more verbal contact with you.

— Olav Anton Thommessen, The Teacher Who Was Not To Be (2006)

In 2015 Thommessen initiated a lengthy debate in the music journal Ballade over Paus' Concerto for Timpani and Orchestra and the merits of the contemporary use of tonal music; it was described as "the biggest public debate about art music" in Norway since the 1970s.

== Production ==
=== Selected works ===
- Some Sound for choir and orchestra, op. 8, 1971
- Et Konsert-Kammer, for amplified soprano and antiphonally arranged instrumental groups, 1971
- "Down-Up/Sunpiece" for orchestra, op. 13, 1972–73
- "Mutually" for two voices and instruments, op. 14, 1973
- Stabsarabesk for wind instruments, op. 15, 1974
- The Hermaphrodite, a ballet opera, op. 18, 1970–80
- Stabat mater speciosa for choir, op. 28, 1977
- Banners for Music for choir and orchestra, op. 32, 1978
- Melologer og monodramaer. En ordløs kammeropera, op. 32, no. 2, 1979/82
- The Second Creation. An orchestral drama for trumpets, op. 32 nr. 4, 1988
- A Glass Bead Game op. 34 nr. 2, 1979–82
- Ekko av et ekko op. 36 nr. 2, 1980
- Macrofantasy On Grieg's, 'Piano Concerto in a Minor', op. 39 nr. 1, 1980
- Beyond Neon. Post-commercial Sound Sculptures for horn and symphony orchestra, op. 41 1980
- Through a Prism A Double Concerto for cello, organ and orchestra, op. 44 nr. 1, 1982–83
- EingeBACHt. InnBACHt parafrase over Toccata in G-major, first movement for piano, op. 47 nr. 1, 1984
- L'éclat approchant for synthesizer and chamber orchestra, op. 52 nr. 1, 1986
- The Duchess Dies, op. 56 nr. 1, 1987
- The Phantom of Light. A Miniature Concerto for cello and two wind quintets, op. 62 nr. 1, 1990
- Edda-Da. Monodrama op. 63a, 1991
- Near the Comet Head, op. 64 nr. 4, 1993–94
- Kassandra op. 69, 1996
- Music for Vandals, op. 76, 1998
- Corelli Machine op. 82, 2002
- Veslemøy synsk – en GRIEGsk musi-collage over Arne Garborgs HAUGTUSSA for mezzosopran og klaver, 2007
- Motett over Wergeland (2008)
- Smykke eller saga (2009)
- Kristi Brud (2012)
- Tuba Mirum (2012)
- The Teacher Who Was Not To Be (2013), librettist (music by Marcus Paus)
- Felix Remix, strykekvartett nr. 4 (2014)
- A symphonic scherzo for strings and orchestra (2015)
- Purpose: For symphonic wind orchestra (2015)

=== Discography ===
- Requiem/Trisyn/Læreren som ikke ble (2022), with The Teacher Who Was Not To Be by Marcus Paus/Thommessen and Requiem by Marcus and Ole Paus
- Bjørn Sagstad, Ila Brass Band, Klang (!) (2012)
- Ernst Simon Glaser, Zvezdochka in orbit (2012)
- Staff Band of the Norwegian Armed Forces, A Tribute to the Northern Winds (2011)
- Veslemøy synsk (2011)
- The Oslo Philharmonic, Peter Herresthal, Bull's Eye; Please accept my ears; Cantabile (2006)
- Corelli Machine (2006)
- Einar Henning Smebye, Guri Egge, Songs from the Last Century (2006)
- Christian Eggen, Oslo Sinfonietta, Norges Musikkhistorie - Bind 5 (2001)
- Kyberia, Navigations (2000)
- Peter Herresthal, Partita für Paul 1. sats (1998)
- Peter Herresthal, Please Accept my Ears! (1998)
- Jeg er flerspors - variasjoner over Olav Anton Thommessen (1998)
- Håkon Austbø, Juni Dahr, Edda-Da (1995)
- Oslo Sinfonietta (1993)
- Gaute Vikdal, Skygger (1992)
- Frode Thorsen (1991)
- Ensemble K 4 Live at Henie-onstad Art Center (1990)
- Frantisek Veselka, New Norwegian Violin Music, Vol.II (1990)
- Frantisek Veselka, New Norwegian Violin Music, Vol.I (1990)
- The Oslo Philharmonic Orchestra, A Glass bead from above (1990)
- Jeunesses Musicales World Orchestra, Scandinavian Tour 1988 (1988)
- Geir Henning Braaten, Norwegian Pianorama (1984)
