= Bobbysocks! (album) =

Studio album by Bobbysocks!
- Released: 1984
- Recorded: Silence Studio - Sweden
- Genre: Pop
- Length: 35:12 (1985 edition)
- Label: Bahama Records
- Producer: Lars Kilevold / Torgny Söderberg

Bobbysocks! chronology
Bobbysocks! (1984)	Waiting for the Morning (1985)

Bobbysocks! was the first album from Norwegian pop duo Bobbysocks!. The album was released in 1984 and in a new version in 1985. The re-release became popular in many parts of the world, and by early 1986 the album had sold around 75,000 copies in Norway. In 2012, the album reached viral popularity when popular YouTube user Nigahiga featured the track "Don't Bring Lulu" in one of his videos. Album sales are estimated to have been at least 12,000 in the following month alone.

== Track listing (1984 version) ==
Side 1:

1. "In the Mud"
  1. "Farewell Blues"
  2. "In the Mood"
2. "Midnight Rocks"
3. "Radio"
4. "Don't Bring Lulu"
5. "Little by Little" - Elisabeth
6. "Shoo-shoo-baby"

Side 2:

1. "Adios" - Hanne
2. "Cross Over the Bridge"
3. "I don't Wanna Break my Heart"
4. "The booglie-wooglie Piggy"
5. "Go on Shakin'"

== Track listing (1985 version) ==
Side 1

1. Let It Swing (La det swinge)
2. Midnight Rocks
3. Radio
4. Don't Bring Lulu
5. Little by Little
6. Shoo-shoo-baby

Side 2

1. Adios
2. Cross Over the Bridge
3. I Don't Wanna Break my Heart
4. The Booglie-Wooglie Piggy
5. Go on Shakin'

== Charts ==
Album

Year	Chart	Position
1985	Norwegian album chart	3

Single

Year	Song	Chart	Position
1985	"La det swinge"/"Let it swing"	Norway's single chart	1
