= Mitt lille land (2011 album) =

2011 Norwegian studio album

Studio album by Maria Mena, Herborg Kråkevik, Maria Solheim, Bjørn Eidsvåg, Halvdan Sivertsen, Dum Dum Boys, Jonas Fjeld, Lynni Treekrem, DDE, Jørn Hoel, Sigvart Dagsland, Kråkesølv, Magnus Eliassen, Kurt Nilsen, Helene Bøksle, Hanne Krogh, Kine Hellebust, Ole Edvard Antonsen, Haddy N'jie, Kringkastingsorkesteret, Åge Aleksandersen and Ole Paus
- Released: 22 September 2011
- Genre: Various
- Label: Sony Music

Mitt lille land ("My Little Country") is a 2011 album released by the Norwegian People's Aid and Sony Music as a memorial album for the 2011 Norway attacks. Its name is from the song Mitt lille land by Ole Paus and includes two versions of this song, performed by Maria Mena and Ole Paus. As of October 2011, it was the best-selling music album in Norway. The album has the subtitle "til minne on 22.7.11" and contains, in addition to the title song "Mitt lille land" by Ole Paus in two versions, other songs that were performed in the aftermath of the terrorist attack in Norway.

== Track listing ==
1. Mitt lille land performed by Maria Mena
2. Til ungdommen performed by Herborg Kråkevik
3. Barn av regnbuen performed by Maria Solheim
4. Eg ser performed by Bjørn Eidsvåg
5. Kjærlighetsvisa performed by Halvdan Sivertsen
6. Tyven, tyven performed by Dum Dum Boys
7. Engler i sneen performed by Jonas Fjeld and Lynni Treekrem
8. Det fine vi hadd’ sammen performed by DDE
9. Ei hand å holde i performed by Jørn Hoel
10. Alt eg såg performed by Sigvart Dagsland
11. Til dem du e gla o performed by Kråkesølv and Magnus Eliassen
12. Gje meg handa di, ven performed by Kurt Nilsen and Helene Bøksle
13. Rose, performed by Hanne Krogh
14. Det hainnle om å leve performed by Kine Hellebust
15. Vitae Lux, performed by Ole Edvard Antonsen
16. Vårherres klinkekule performed by Haddy N'jie and Kringkastingsorkesteret (live)
17. Lys og varme performed by Åge Aleksandersen and Kringkastingsorkesteret (live)
18. Mitt lille land performed by Ole Paus
