= Jan Werner =

Jan Werner may refer to:

- Jan Werner Danielsen (1976–2006), Norwegian pop rock singer
- Jan Werner (athlete) (1946–2014), Polish athlete
