= Waiting for the Moon =

Waiting for the Moon may refer to:

- Waiting for the Moon (film), a 1987 film about Gertrude Stein and Alice B. Toklas
- Waiting for the Moon (album), an album by Tindersticks
- Waiting for the Moon (musical), a musical with music by Frank Wildhorn and lyrics by Jack Murphy
- "Waiting for the Morning" (song), a song by Jon Terje Rovedal, Thoreby, Lars Kildvold and Eivind Rölles
- "Waiting for the Moon", a song by Basshunter from The Old Shit album
