= Mitt lille land =

1994 song by Ole Paus

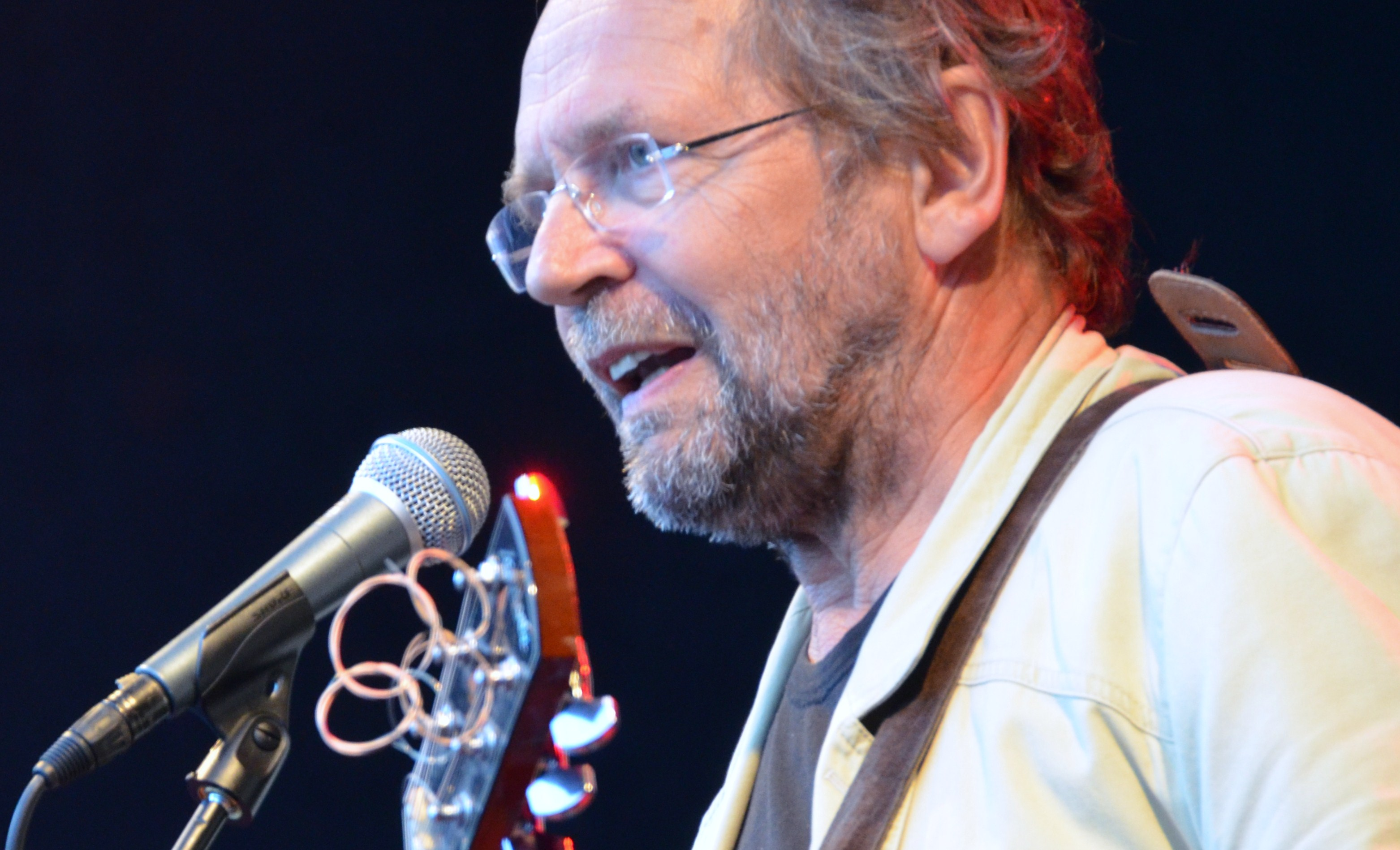
Ole Paus

"Mitt lille land" (in English: "My Little Country" or "My Small Country") is a song by Ole Paus, written in 1994 as a lyrical description of Norway. The song gained strong popularity following the 2011 Norway attacks, which led to it being described by the media as "the new national anthem." According to the NRK, the song "came to symbolize the sorrow many people went through." The song featured most prominently in all the memorial ceremonies following the attacks.

The NRK memorial concert (30 July 2011) following the attacks was named "Mitt lille land," and the concert opened with "Mitt lille land" sung by Maria Mena. The national memorial ceremony (21 August 2011) was opened with "Mitt lille land" sung by Susanne Sundfør, followed by a speech by King Harald V. On the Norwegian Constitution Day in 2012, the NRK broadcast was opened with "Mitt lille land." The Norwegian People's Aid and Sony Music released a memorial album titled Mitt lille land and Gyldendal Norsk Forlag published a memorial book also titled Mitt lille land during the autumn of 2011. Numerous Norwegian artists have recorded cover versions of this song, among them Sondre Bratland, Christine Guldbrandsen, Maria Solheim, Thomas Dybdahl, Mari Boine, Anne Grete Preus, Haddy N'jie, Kurt Nilsen, D.D.E., Sølvguttene, Tone Damli Aaberge and Maria Mena.

The song was originally written for the pro-EU organisation "Fra Nei til Ja" (From No to Yes) in connection with the 1994 Norwegian European Union membership referendum, and the song has been described as ironic. Ole Paus denied in 2011 that the song was ironic. According to Professor of Musicology Even Ruud, "the music and the text are very open. There is nothing in the song that is related to a particular time, which means that it can be interpreted in several different ways." The song was originally released on the album also titled Mitt lille land in 1994, which contained four tracks. The first track was Mitt lille land and the last track was a rap performed by Ole Paus and Labour politician and then-Minister of Trade and Shipping Affairs Grete Knudsen titled Sjølråderetten fallera!.
