= Elisabeth (Elisabeth Andreassen album) =

- Album cover

Studio album by Elisabeth Andreassen
- Released: April 1990
- Recorded: 1989–1990
- Genre: Rock
- Label: Sonet Grammofon AB
- Producer: Stefan Lagström, Elisabeth Andreassen, Leif Allansson, Peter Stedt

Elisabeth Andreassen chronology
Älskar, älskar ej (1988)	Elisabeth (1990)	Stemninger (1992)

Elisabeth is a 1990 album by Norwegian singer Elisabeth Andreassen. The song "Jag ser en stjärna falla" earned her a seventh-place finish in Melodifestivalen 1990, the Swedish qualifier for the Eurovision Song Contest 1990.

== Track listing ==
=== Side A ===
1. "Varje gång du rör mig"
2. "Kvinna för dig"
3. "Nä, nä, nä (Rätt eller fel)"
4. "Vänskapen består" ("That's why I fell in Love with You")
5. "Ta mig" ("For True Love")

=== Side B ===
1. "Jag ser en stjärna falla"
2. "Segla med mig"
3. "Kortet de' e' lagt"
4. "Kärlek som din" - ("A Lover Like You") - duet with Tommy Nilsson
5. "Utan dig"
6. "Kylig natt" ("Looks Like It's Gonna Rain Today")

== Participating musicians ==
- Lasse Jonsson – guitar
- Bosse Persson – bass
- Lasse Persson – drums
- Hans Gardemar – keyboard
