= Kärleken & livet =

Studio album by Elisabeth Andreassen
- Released: January 20, 2012 (Norway); January 23, 2012 (Sweden)
- Recorded: 2010–2011
- Genre: Folk music
- Label: Grappa (Norge)
- Producer: Bjørn Ole Rasch

Elisabeth Andreassen chronology
Julenatt (2009)	Kärleken & livet (2012)	De fineste (2014)

Kärleken & livet is a 2012 studio album by Elisabeth Andreassen, and a tribute to Rolf Løvland.

== Låtlista ==
1. Kärleken och livet
2. Mitt land (My Land)
3. Alt du er for meg (Song from a Secret garden / The Things You are to Me)
4. Ta meg heim (Greenwaves)
5. Fyll ditt hjärta (Raise your Voices)
6. Duett
7. Havet
8. Danse mot vår
9. Sang i en stormfull natt (Song for a Stormy Night)
10. Första sommaren (Celebration)
11. Du ga meg en vår
12. Rör vid min själ (You Raise Me Up)
13. La det swinge (Orsa Spelmän)

== Charts ==
Chart (2012)	Peak position
Norway (VG-lista)	30
