= I'm a Woman =

I'm a Woman may refer to:

- I'm a Woman (Peggy Lee album) (1963)
- I'm a Woman (Elisabeth Andreassen album) (1983)
- I'm a Woman (Shannon Bex album) (2012)
- "I'm a Woman" (song), 1962 song first recorded by Christine Kittrell
- I'm a Woman, a 1978 adaptation of Bo Diddley's I'm a Man by Koko Taylor
