= Elisabeth Andreasson (album) =

Studio album by Elisabeth Andreasson
- Released: November 1985
- Recorded: 1985
- Genre: Pop
- Label: Mariann Grammofon
- Producer: Leif Larson, Lennart Sjöholm, Radu Wouk

Elisabeth Andreasson chronology
Angel of the Morning (1985)	Elisabeth Andreasson (1985)	Greatest Hits Vol 2. (1985)

Elisabeth Andreasson is the 1985 self-titled studio album by Elisabeth Andreasson.

== Track listing ==
=== Side A ===
1. "Stanna"
2. "Ängel i natt" (The Power of Love)
3. "Lätta vingar"
4. "Kom hem igen"
5. "Some Boys"
6. "Det kan aldrig bli du"

=== Side B ===
1. "Tissel Tassel"
2. "We'll Make It" (duet with Jan Andreasson)
3. "Du bryr dig inte om"
4. "Is It Over"
5. "Vi passerar Gå"
