= Sverre Krogh Sundbø =

Norwegian television presenter

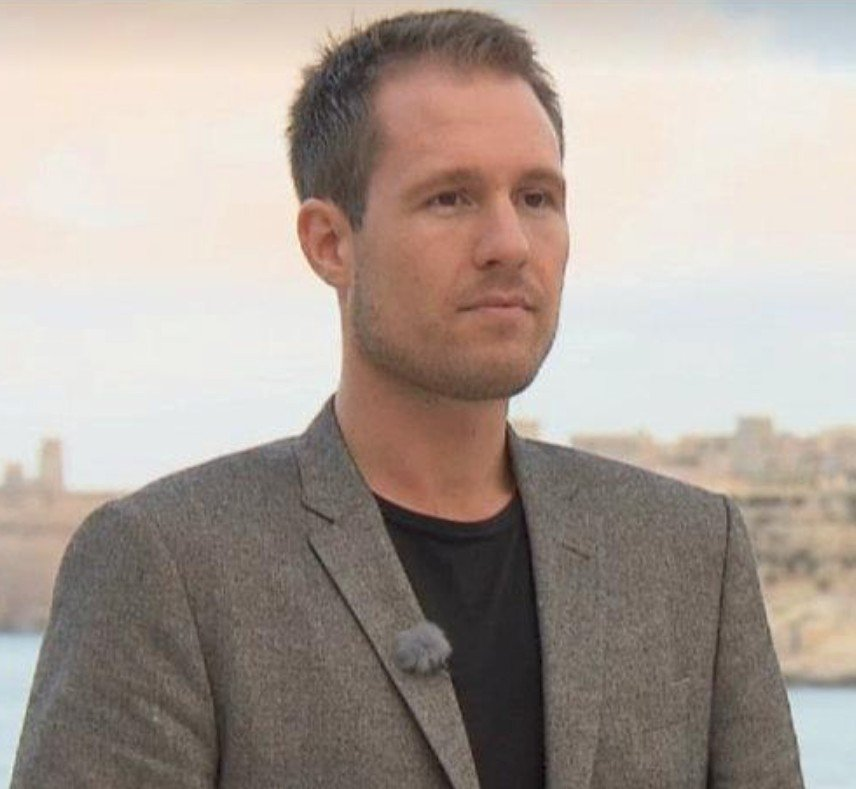
- Sundbø from "Det store spillet" 2012

Sverre Krogh Sundbø is a Norwegian television presenter, sports commentator, and former professional poker player. He has presented sports and entertainment programs for broadcasters in Norway and internationally, including multiple Olympic Games for Norwegian television. His broadcasting career spans a wide range of sports and entertainment formats such as game shows, reality television, and travel programs.

Before establishing his television career, Krogh Sundbø competed professionally in poker, winning the European Poker Championship title in London in 2005 and reaching a final table at the World Series of Poker in Las Vegas in 2008.

== Career ==
=== Television and broadcasting ===
Krogh Sundbø began working in broadcasting at the age of 15 as a presenter and contributor to Radio Oslofjord.

He subsequently developed a career in television, working across sports and entertainment formats for broadcasters including TV2, NRK, TVNorge, TV3, and the UK channel ITV. His early work included poker coverage, before expanding into more mainstream entertainment television.

He has since hosted several television shows and sports broadcasts in both Norway and abroad, including serving as a television presenter for Norwegian broadcasts of both the Summer and Winter Olympic Games. He currently hosts a sports talk show for TV2 while also working with a wide array of different sports.

=== Poker career ===
Krogh Sundbø was a professional poker player during the 2000s and was among the early Norwegian players to establish an international presence in the sport.

In 2005, he won the European Poker Championship title in London. He later joined The Norsemen, a professional Norwegian poker team, and became a member of Team PokerStars.

After retiring from professional tournament poker, he remained involved in poker as a television presenter and expert commentator.

=== Sporting background ===
During his youth, Krogh Sundbø competed in football, bandy and tennis, winning several Norwegian national championships at the youth level.

He later attended the University of San Francisco in the United States.

=== Reality television ===
In addition to his work as a television presenter, Krogh Sundbø has appeared as a contestant on several Norwegian television shows.

In 2024, he participated in the fourth season of Forræder, the Norwegian adaptation of The Traitors, in which he was selected to play as a traitor.

He has also participated in other television programs, including Alle mot alle, Kode Rød and Sistemann ut.

=== Personal life ===
Krogh Sundbø is the son of Norwegian singer Hanne Krogh and journalist Trygve Sundbø.
