= Short Stories (Elisabeth Andreassen album) =

Studio album by Elisabeth Andreassen
- Released: October 17, 2005
- Genre: Country
- Label: Tylden & Co. AS
- Producer: Lars Lien

Elisabeth Andreassen chronology
| A Couple of Days in Larsville (2004) | Short Stories (2005) | Spellemann (2009) |

Short Stories is a country album from Norwegian singer Elisabeth Andreassen. The album was released in Norway on October 17, 2005 and in Sweden on June 14, 2006.

== Track listing ==
1. "The Year We Painted Pink"
2. "I Met Bob"
3. "Tears of Led" - (duet with Bjarte Hjelmeland)
4. "Jackson" - (duet with Lee Hazlewood)
5. "Boulder to Birmingham"
6. "She Could Even Talk to the Sparrows It Seems"
7. "Forever Faithful"
8. "My Tennessee Mountain Home"
9. "I Still Miss Someone"
10. "Amarillo" (Emmylou Harris, Rodney Crowell)
11. "Last Night"
12. "I Never Will Marry"

== Charts ==
| Chart (2005) | Peak position |
|---|---|
| Norway Album Top 40 | 31 |
