= Zoo (Norwegian band) =

Norwegian musicial group

Zoo was a Norwegian band mainly active in the late 1970s and early 1980s, though founded in 1966. The band consisted of Ketil Stokkan (guitars, vocals), Sverri Dahl (keyboards, vocals), Erling Andersen (bass guitar, vocals), Rudi Høynes (drums, vocals) and Trond Nyrud (flutes, saxophones).

== History ==
They rose to national success with the singles "Evig ung" ("Forever Young", 1980) and "Vent, ikkje legg på" ("Wait, Don't Hang Up", 1981). Frontman and songwriter Stokkan later represented Norway twice in the Eurovision Song Contest.

Noregs heitaste was issued in March 1980. Its musical basis was funk rock and Zoo introduced Norwegian-only lyrics, specifically in the Northern Norwegian dialect. There was a featuring appearance from Anita Skorgan.

== Reception ==
The album received mixed reviews, though some praised Stokkan for being "among the finest pop vocalists in this country".

== Discography ==
- 1978 – Captured in Zoo
- 1979 – Guilty
- 1980 – Noregs heitaste
- 1980 – Z på maken
- 1981 – Gaya
- 1982 – Shagalai
- 1994 – Zoobra (compilation)
- 2000 – Evig ung (compilation)
