= Krem Nasjonal =

Norwegian television series

- Genre: Comedy
- Country of origin: Norway
- Original language: Norwegian
- No. of seasons: 3

Production
- Running time: 30 minutes

Original release
- Network: NRK 1 NRK Super
- Release: October 17, 2009

Krem Nasjonal was a Norwegian television show that first aired in 2009. The show contained sketches and quizzes. It was hosted by Erik Solbakken, together with the co-hosts Magnus and Signe.

The intro and some content is inspired by the Canadian show You Can't Do That on Television.

== The concept ==
=== The "gatekamp" ===
In the "gatekamp" (streetduel), Magnus and Signe are on the street and competing against each other. The content of each "gatekamp" is different. One can be to see who can talk to a stranger for the longest time, and another can be who can take most pictures of persons making funny faces.

=== The "hermegåsa" ===
==== Selection ====
The "hermegåsa" (imitate king) is a competition where two famous guests selects two children from the audience to be on their teams. The two children with the best grimaces will be chosen.

==== The first part ====
In the first and second season, the child on each team had to imitate the guest. If they got it right, they got a point. In season three, both the guest and the child have to imitate after an old videoclip. In season 3, one team also got an extra point from the co-hosts, Magnus and Signe.

==== The second part ====
In the second part, the teams have to imitate after the host, Erik. He dance a type of dance, like ballet or tango. The teams get one point for each dance they did right. If there is a tie after the second part, the competition will be determined by rock-paper-scissors.

== Musical guests ==
Krem Nasjonal have had many musical guests on the show, including the MGP Nordic winner Ulrik Munther, Maria Mittet and Måns Zelmerlöw.
