= Waiting for the Morning (song) =

Single by Bobbysocks!

from the album Waiting for the Morning
- A-side: "Waiting for the Morning"
- B-side: "Working Heart"
- Released: 1986
- Genre: pop
- Songwriter(s): Lars Kildvold; Jon Terje Rovedal; Eivind Rölles; Jan Thoreby

"Waiting for the Morning" is a song written by Jon Terje Rovedal, Thoreby, Lars Kildvold and Eivind Rölles, and originally performed by the Bobbysocks! on the 1986 album, Waiting for the Morning. In 1986, the single topped the Norwegian singles chart.

In 1988, the song was recorded by Kikki Danielsson, acting as a B-side for her single "Let Them Walk in the Sunshine". Susanne Alfvengren wrote lyrics in Swedish, as "Väntar ännu på den morgon", and a Swedish-language version was recorded by Kikki Danielsson on her 1989 album Canzone d'Amore. The Kikki Danielsson recording was also included as film soundtrack for the 1990 film Blackjack.

== Charts ==
| Chart (1986) | Peak position |
|---|---|
| Norway (VG-lista) | 1 |
