= I'm a Woman (Elisabeth Andreassen album) =

Studio album by Elisabeth Andreasson
- Released: November 1983
- Recorded: KMH Studio, Stockholm, Sweden, September 1983
- Genre: Pop
- Label: Mariann Grammofon
- Producer: Torgny Söderberg; Rutger Gunnarsson

Elisabeth Andreasson chronology
Angel of the Morning (1981)	I'm a Woman (1983)	Elisabeth Andreasson (1985)

I'm a Woman is an album by Elisabeth Andreasson, released in November 1983. The album sold circa 30,000 copies in Sweden, which as of 2006 corresponded to a golden record.

== Track listing ==
=== Side A ===
1. "Sommarreggae (Sunshine Reggae)"
2. "Om jag lyssnar"
3. "Gå nu"
4. "Stjärnhimmel"
5. "Stanna"
6. "Operator"

=== Side B ===
1. "I'm a Woman"
2. "Du värmer mig"
3. "Jag vågar tala om"
4. "Håll mig hårt" (duet with Jan Andreasson)
5. "Drömmer om dig i natt"
6. "Se på mig jag flyger"
