= Julestemninger =

Studio album by Elisabeth Andreassen
- Released: 1993
- Genre: Christmas
- Label: PolyGram A/S
- Producer: Rolf Løvland

Elisabeth Andreassen chronology
Stemninger (1992)	Julestemninger (1993)	Elisabeth Andreassens bästa 1981-1995 (1995)

Julestemninger is a 1993 Christmas album from Norwegian singer Elisabeth Andreasson. Within a short time, the album sold gold. The song "Ledet av en stjerne" became a hit. On the album, choir singers from the Oslo Gospel Choir and musicians from the Oslo Philharmonic appear. The cooperation with the Philharmonic orchestra led to Elisabeth becoming soloist during their 1993 Christmas concert.

== Track listing ==
1. "Ledet av en stjerne"
2. "Nå tennes tusen julelys" (Nu tändas tusen juleljus)
3. "Jeg er så glad hver julekveld"
4. "Lille Messias"
5. "Dejlig er jorden (Dejlig er jorden/Härlig är jorden)"
6. "Den vakreste julen"
7. "Glade jul (Glade jul, dejlige jul/Stille Nacht/Stilla natt)"
8. "Det hev ei rose sprunge (Es ist ein Ros entsprungen/Det är en ros utsprungen)"
9. "Marias vuggesang"
10. "O, helga natt"
