= Terje Fjærn =

- Born: Terje Egil Tolås Fjærn; 25 August 1942; Molde, Norway
- Origin: Norway
- Died: 8 June 2016 (aged 73) Oslo, Norway

Terje Egil Tolås Fjærn (25 August 1942 – 8 June 2016) was a Norwegian musician, orchestra leader and musical conductor. He was first married to singer Gro Anita Schønn (1950-2001) and later to Lillemor Korsell.

== Discography ==
Recorded works
Collaborators	Works
Gro Anita Schønn and Stein Ingebrigtsen	1972: Jule… (RCA)
Stein & Inger Lise	1972: Hello-A! (RCA Victor), as musical arranger and conductor
Stein Ingebrigtsen	1973: Bara Stein (Talent)
Einar Schanke	1974: Einar Schankes Gledeshus (Camp Records)
Gro Anita Schønn	1974: Takk For Glitter Og Dtas (Talent)
Terje Fjærn's Orchestra	1975: Rendezvous (Talent)
Sylfest Strutle	1985: Live At Gildevann (Camp Records)
