= A Couple of Days in Larsville =

Studio album by Elisabeth Andreassen
- Released: September 13, 2004
- Recorded: 2004
- Genre: Country
- Label: Norwave AS
- Producer: Lars Lien

Elisabeth Andreassen chronology
Kjærlighetsviser (2001)	A Couple of Days in Larsville (2004)	Short Stories (2005)

A Couple of Days in Larsville is a country album from Norwegian singer Elisabeth Andreassen. The album was released in Norway on September 13, 2004. The album was released in Australia, Denmark, Iceland and Sweden around New Year's Day 2005.

== Track listing ==
No.	Title	Length
1.	"Long Ride Home"	3:54
2.	"The Eastern Line"	2:30
3.	"Goodbye"	4:29
4.	"Window In The Sky"	3:22
5.	"Sin City"	3:42
6.	"I Will Not Turn To Stone"	3:17
7.	"When I Fall" (duet with Henning Kvitnes)	4:14
8.	"Happiness"	3:40
9.	"Soon You'll Fly"	4:37
10.	"A Fisherman's Daughter"	3:16
11.	"I Don't Wanna Talk About It"	6:00
12.	"Jolene"	3:22

== Charts ==
Chart (2004)	Peak position
Norway Album Top 40	29
