= Kjærlighetsviser =

Studio album by Elisabeth Andreassen
- Released: October 1, 2001
- Genre: Pop
- Label: Norske Gram AS
- Producer: Svein Gundersen, Svein Dag Hauge

Elisabeth Andreassen chronology
20 bästa (1998)	Kjærlighetsviser (2001)	A Couple of Days in Larsville (2004)

Kjærlighetsviser is an album of love songs by the Norwegian singer Elisabeth Andreassen. It was released in Norway on October 1, 2001.

== Track listing ==
1. "Vi vandrar saman"
2. "Kjærlighetsvisa"
3. "Dains me dæ"
4. "Ingen er så nydelig som du"
5. "Har en drøm"
6. "Lys og varme"
7. "Tusen bitar"
8. "Neste sommer"
9. "Vinsjan på kaia"
10. "Eg ser"
11. "En natt forbi"

== Charts ==
Chart (2001)	Peak position
Norway (VG-lista)	5
