= Lys og varme =

Single by Åge Aleksandersen
- A-side: "Lys og varme"
- Released: 1984
- Songwriter: Åge Aleksandersen

"Lys og varme" is a song written and recorded by Åge Aleksandersen in 1984. Benny Borg wrote lyrics in Swedish, as "Ljus och värme", and many dansbands begun to sing and play it. In 1986, the song was recorded in Swedish by Matz Bladhs and Vikingarna.

At Dansbandskampen 2008, the song was performed by Wahlströms, and their version appeared on the official 2008 Dnsbandskampen compilation album.

In 2001, the song was recorded by Elisabeth Andreassen on the album Kjærlighetsviser. A heavy metal version was recorded by Black Ingvars on the 1995 album Earcandy Five frå. In 2007 Roland Cedermark recorded an accordion-based instrumental version.

The song has also been recorded by Nick Borgen.
