= Bettan =

Bettan is a surname. Notable people with the surname include:

- Israel Bettan (1889–1957), Lithuanian-American rabbi and professor
- Noam Bettan (born 1998), Israeli singer and songwriter

== See also ==
- Elisabeth Andreassen, a.k.a. Bettan, (born 1958), Norwegian-Swedish singer
- Kikki, Bettan & Lotta, Swedish-Norwegian super trio
- Mary Bettans (c. 1788–1859), English dressmaker
