= Älskar, älskar ej =

Studio album by Elisabeth Andreasson
- Released: November 1988
- Studio: Synchrosound (Nashville, Tennessee); Sound Emporium (Nashville, Tennessee)
- Genre: country, rock
- Label: Sonet Grammofon
- Producer: Wendy Waldman

Elisabeth Andreasson chronology
Greatest Hits (1986)	Älskar, älskar ej (1988)	Elisabeth (1990)

Älskar, älskar ej is a studio album by Elisabeth Andreasson, released in November 1988.

The album release saw Elisabeth Andreassen changing into a tougher style. This album was her first ever released to CD, and was successful. It was followed up by her touring Scandinavia from March to September 1989.

== Track listing ==
1. "Darija is Good for You"
2. "Älskar, älskar ej"
3. "Heidi Loves You"
4. "That's Where the Trouble Lies"
5. "Mersi Does Not Love Everybody"
6. "Endlessly"
7. "Kärlekens hav"
8. "No Way to Treat a Lady"
9. "One Little Heart"
10. "Where There's Love There's a Way"
11. "Desperado" (Desperado)
12. "Momma's Boy Oliver"
