= Julenatt =

Studio album by Elisabeth Andreassen & Rein Alexander
- Released: September 16, 2009 (Norway)
- Recorded: Kongshavn Studio, Kristiansand, September–October 2009
- Genre: Christmas
- Label: EMI Music Norway
- Producer: Bjørn Ole Rasch

Elisabeth Andreassen & Rein Alexander chronology
| Spellemann (2009) | Julenatt (2009) | Kärleken & livet (2012) |

Julenatt is a Christmas album by Elisabeth Andreassen and Rein Alexander, released in Norway on 16 November 2009, and followed up by a church tour. The album peaked at 11th position at the Norwegian.

The album was recorded inside the Kongshavn Studio in Kristiansand between September–October 2009. Bjørn Ole Rasch produced the album, and the songs are based on the 2008 and 2009 Elisabeth Andreassen and Rein Alexander church tours. The first tour, "Julekonsert med Rein Alexander & Elisabeth Andreassen", was carried out in November–December 2009 and becoming a major success, it was followed up by the "Julenatt" tour before Christmas 2009. While most songs originate from the 2009 tour, even songs from the 2008 tour appear on the album as well.

The album contains older and newer songs sung in Swedish, Norwegian, English and Latin. Among the songs are Glade jul (Glade jul, dejlige jul/Stille Nacht, heilige Nacht/Stilla natt, heliga natt), O helga natt, Deilig er jorden (Schönster Herr Jesu), Little Drummer Boy "Det lyser i stille grender", John Lennon's "Happy Xmas (War Is Over)" and Carola Häggkvist's "Himlen i min famn".

== Track listing ==
1. Glade jul (Stille Nacht, heilige Nacht)
2. Peace on Earth/Little Drummer Boy
3. Himlen i min famn
4. Det lyser i stille grender
5. Julenatt
6. Vitae Lux
7. Juletid, juletid
8. Sigma
9. Breath of Heaven (Mary's Song)
10. Happy Xmas (War Is Over)
11. Coventry Carol
12. O helga natt (Cantique Noël)
13. Deilig er jorden (Schönster Herr Jesu)

== Chart positions ==
| Chart (2009) | Peak position |
|---|---|
| Norway (VG-lista) | 11 |
