= Erik Solbakken =

Norwegian television presenter

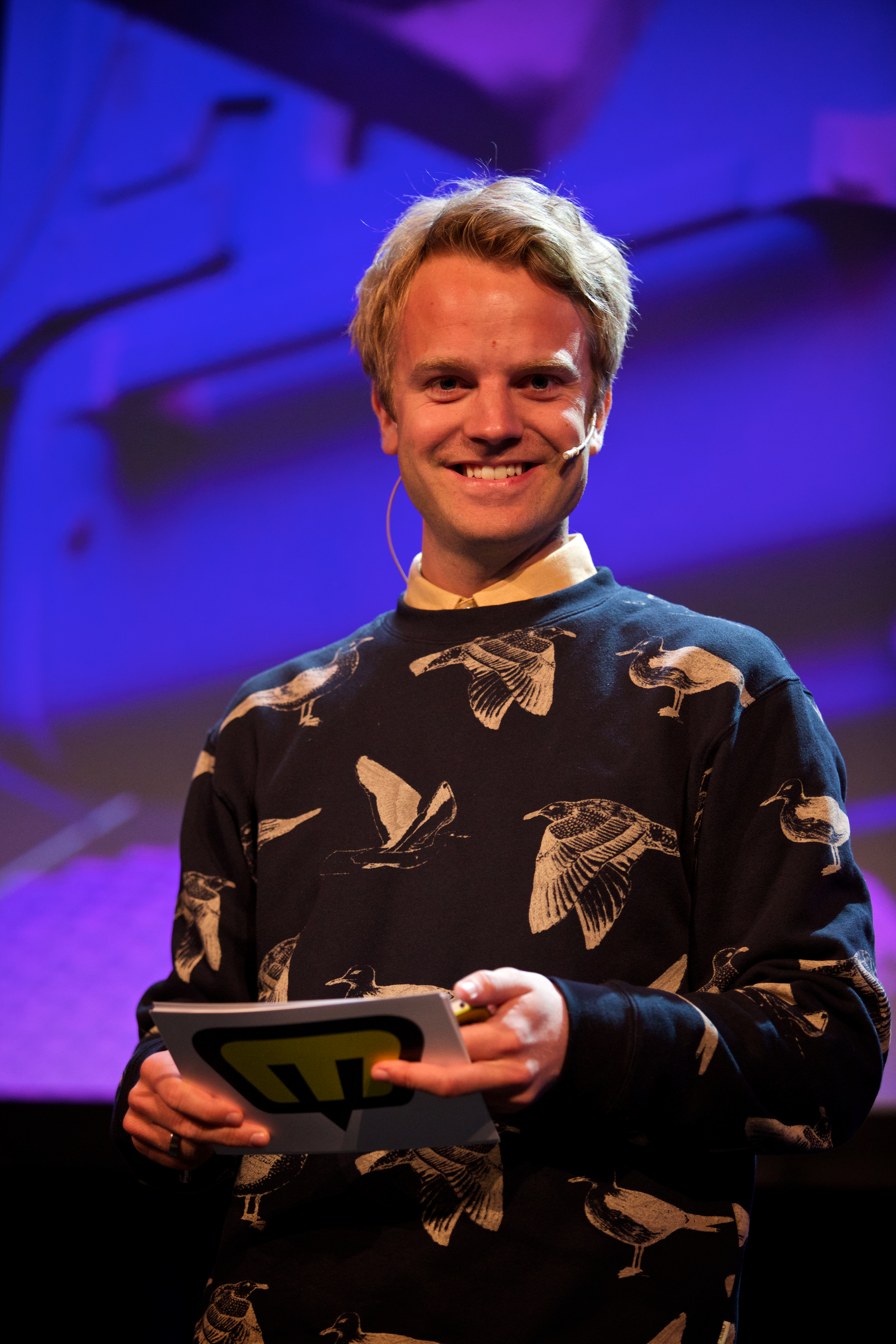
- Solbakken in May 2014
- Born: 17 November 1984 (age 40); Hemsedal, Norway
- Occupation: Television presenter
- Years active: 2005–present

Erik Solbakken (born 17 November 1984) is a Norwegian television presenter. Solbakken hosted the Eurovision Song Contest 2010 together with Haddy Jatou N'jie and Nadia Hasnaoui.

== Career ==
Solbakken trained as a journalist at Volda University College and has worked for the state-owned Norwegian broadcaster NRK, hosting multiple children's shows including Barne-tv, Julemorgen, Krem Nasjonal, and Superkviss, as well as Barnetimen for de minste on NRK P2.

In 2011, Solbakken hosted the prestigious sports award show Idrettsgallaen with Haddy N'jie from Hamar Olympic Amphitheatre which was broadcast live on NRK.

In 2011, he hosted the Eurovision Young Dancers competition in Oslo. Alongside Jenny Skavlan, Solbakken hosted Melodi Grand Prix, the Norwegian national selection for the Eurovision Song Contest, in 2013 and 2014.

== See also ==
- List of Eurovision Song Contest presenters

Preceded by (Russia) Semi-finals: Natalia Vodianova and Andrey Malahov; Final: Alsou and Ivan Urgant	Eurovision Song Contest presenter 2010; With: Nadia Hasnaoui and Haddy Jatou N'jie	Succeeded by (Germany) Anke Engelke, Judith Rakers and Stefan Raab
