= Tor Endresen =

Norwegian singer and composer

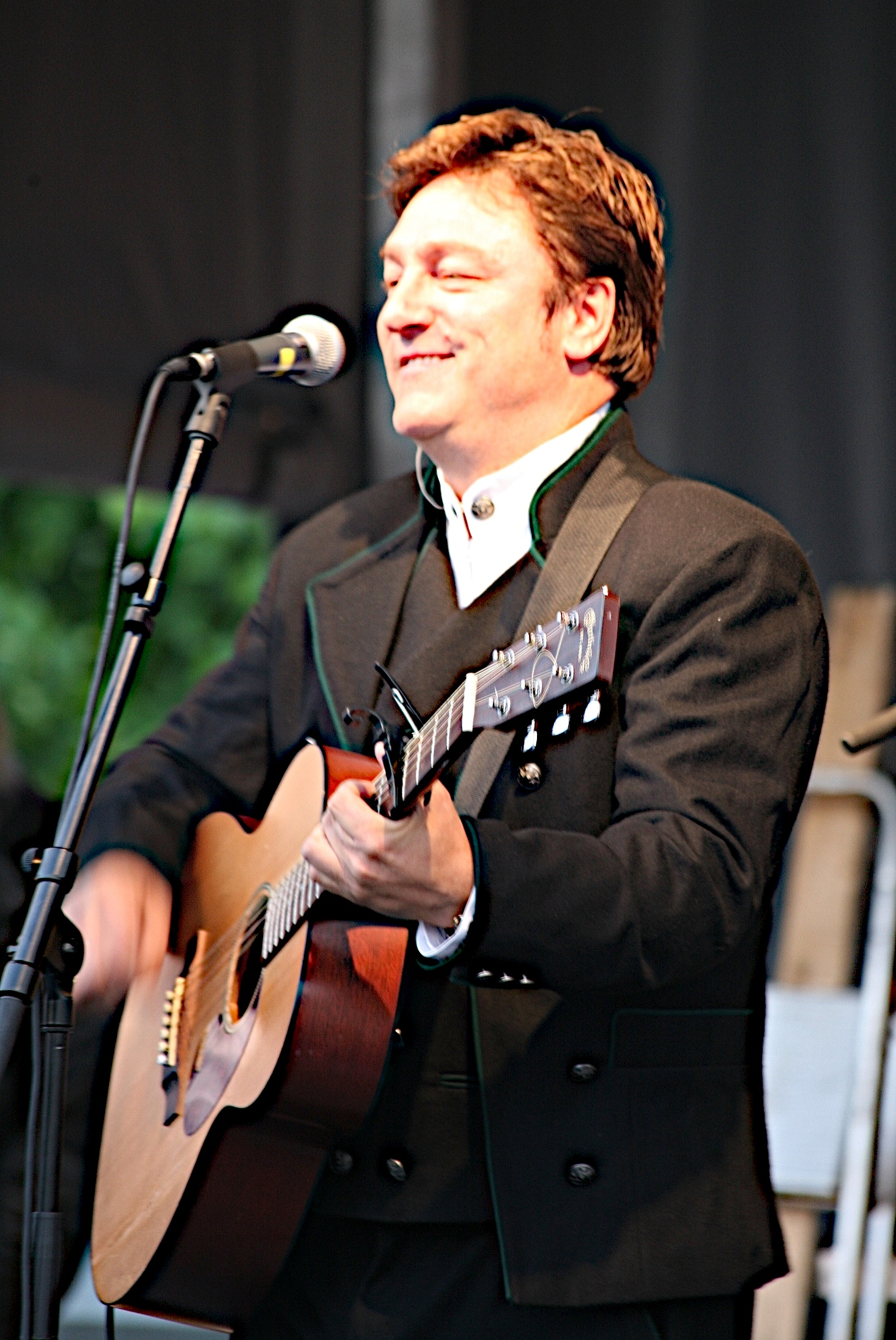
- Endresen performing in 2007

Background information
- Born: 15 June 1959 (age 66); Bergen, Norway
- Occupations: singer, composer
- Labels: CNR Records, Polydor

Tor Lars Oskar Endresen (born 15 June 1959) is a Norwegian singer and composer.

He has entered the Norwegian song selection for the Eurovision Song Contest numerous times, but has only won it once, and represented Norway in the Eurovision Song Contest 1997, where he finished in last place with nul points.

Endresen was part of a popular Norwegian TV show in the early 1990s, a show with pop music from the 1950s and 1960s called Lollipop, as a singing bartender. The show went on for 30 episodes, and there were released three albums (English lyrics) with music from the show which sold very well in Norway.

A single called "Black Rain" which was released from his album Call Me Stranger in 1986, was nearly chosen as the themesong for the James Bond film The Living Daylights in 1987. (The choice fell on the Norwegian group a-ha instead.)

He has been awarded two film music awards from Disney for his singing contribution to the Norwegian version of Disney films.

== Hits ==
- 1992 "Radio Luxembourg"
- 1991 "Ingen er så nydelig som du"

== Discography ==
=== Album ===
- 2013 – Jumping For Joy
- 2005 – Now And Forever
- 2004 – Retrofeelia
- 2001 – Julen i våre hjerter (Christmas album with daughter Anne Sophie)
- 2001 – Trippel Tor (CD-box) (reissue of Solo, Tor Endresen II and Sanger)
- 2000 – Blue
- 1999 – Tarzan – Norwegian original film music
- 1998 – Nære ting (with Rune Larsen)
- 1997 – De aller beste (collection)
- 1996 – Sanger
- 1995 – Det beste fra Lollipop (collection)
- 1992 – Tor Endresen II
- 1992 – Collection (with Pål Thowsen) ((collection))
- 1991 – Lollipop Jukebox (with Rune Larsen, Carola, Karoline Krüger and The Lollipops)
- 1991 – Solo
- 1990 – Lollipop 2 (with Rune Larsen and The Lollipops)
- 1989 – Lollipop (with Rune Larsen)
- 1989 – Life Goes On (with Pål Thowsen)
- 1986 – Call Me Stranger (with Pål Thowsen) (includes Ole Edvard Antonsen)

=== Melodi Grand Prix ===
- 2015 – "All over the world" with Elisabeth Andreassen
- 2006 – "Dreaming of a new tomorrow" (5th)
- 2005 – "Can you hear me" (with the group Seppo – 5th)
- 1999 – "Lover" (3rd)
- 1997 – "San Francisco" (1st)
- 1994 – "Aladdin" (2nd)
- 1993 – "Hva" (3rd)
- 1992 – "Radio Luxembourg" (2nd)
- 1990 – "Café le swing" (3rd)
- 1989 – "Til det gryr av dag" (2nd)
- 1988 – "Lengt" (4th)
- 1987 – "Hemmelig drøm" (9th)

=== Eurovision Song Contest ===
- 1997 – "San Francisco" (Equal 24th and last)
- 1988 – "For Vår Jord" – Backing singer for Karoline Krüger

== Charts ==
Chart	Provider(s)	Peak position	Album	Year
Norwegian Albums Chart	VG Nett	32	Det aller beste	1997
Norwegian Albums Chart	VG Nett	40	Sanger	1996
Norwegian Albums Chart	VG Nett	9	Det beste fra Lollipop	1995
Norwegian Albums Chart	VG Nett	13	Tor Endresen II	1992
Norwegian Albums Chart	VG Nett	7	Solo	1991
Norwegian Albums Chart	VG Nett	8	Lollipop	1989–1990

== See also ==
- Eurovision Song Contest
- Eurovision Song Contest 1997
- Melodi Grand Prix

Awards and achievements
Preceded by Elisabeth Andreassen with "I evighet"	Norway in the Eurovision Song Contest; 1997	Succeeded by Lars A. Fredriksen with "Alltid sommer"
