= Paus-posten =

Studio album by Ole Paus
- Released: 1977
- Recorded: 1977
- Genre: Broadside ballad

Paus-posten ("The Paus Post") is a music album by Ole Paus from 1977. It was included in the primary Norwegian singles chart VG-lista for 15 weeks in 1977 and made it to number 6. It was the first of five albums in the format of a musical newspaper in which Paus provided biting social and political commentary in short, spontaneous and ironic broadside ballads.
