= Angel of the Morning (album) =

Studio album by Elisabeth Andreassen
- Released: November 1981
- Recorded: KMH Studio, Stockholm, 1981
- Genre: Country pop, schlager
- Length: 49:44
- Language: Swedish, English
- Label: Mariann Records
- Producer: Lasse Holm

Elisabeth Andreassen chronology
Angel of the Morning (1981)	I'm a Woman (1983)

Angel of the Morning, released in 1981, is the debut album of Norwegian singer Elisabeth Andreassen, and the first of several solo albums. Previously, she sang with Mats Rådberg on his album I'm the Singer, You're the Song (1980). Angel of the Morning contains songs in both Swedish and English, including "Angel of the Morning", which Andreassen released in the early 1980s, and the hit "Då lyser en sol". The album reached approximately 20,000 sales in Sweden, equivalent to selling gold in Norway. It peaked at #46 at the Swedish album chart.

== Track listing ==
Side A

#	Title	Songwriter	Length
1.	"Lipstick on Your Collar"	George Goehring, Edna Lewis	2.44
2.	"Hard Times"	Bobby Braddock	2.50
3.	"En enda morgon (Angel of the Morning)"	Chip Taylor, Mats Rådberg	4.09
4.	"Han pendlar varje dag (Morning Train)"	Florrie Palmer, Olle Bergman	3.15
5.	"Dreamer"	Lasse Holm	4.11
6.	"But Love Me"	Kenny Nolan	3.14
7.	"Då lyser en sol"	Lasse Holm	4.32

Side B

#	Title	Songwriter	Length
8.	"Killen ner' på Konsum svär att han är Elvis (There's a Guy Works Down the Chipchop Swears He's Elvis)"	Kirsty MacColl, Philip Rambow, Hasse Olsson	3.09
9.	"Together Again"	Buck Owens	3.48
10.	"What's Forever for"	Rafe Van Hoy	3.17
11.	"Hallå du härliga söndag"	Lasse Holm	3.34
12.	"Blessed are the Believers"	Charlie Black, Rory Bourke, Sandy Pinkard	2.47
13.	"Take Me Away"	Lasse Holm	4.05
14.	"När jag behövde dig mest (Just When I Needed You Most)"	Randy Vanwarmer, Lasse Holm	4.09

== Chart positions ==
Chart (1981)	Peak position
Sweden (Sverigetopplistan)	46
