= Donald Duck Party =

- Leader: Bosse Persson
- Headquarters: Sweden
- Ideology: Joke

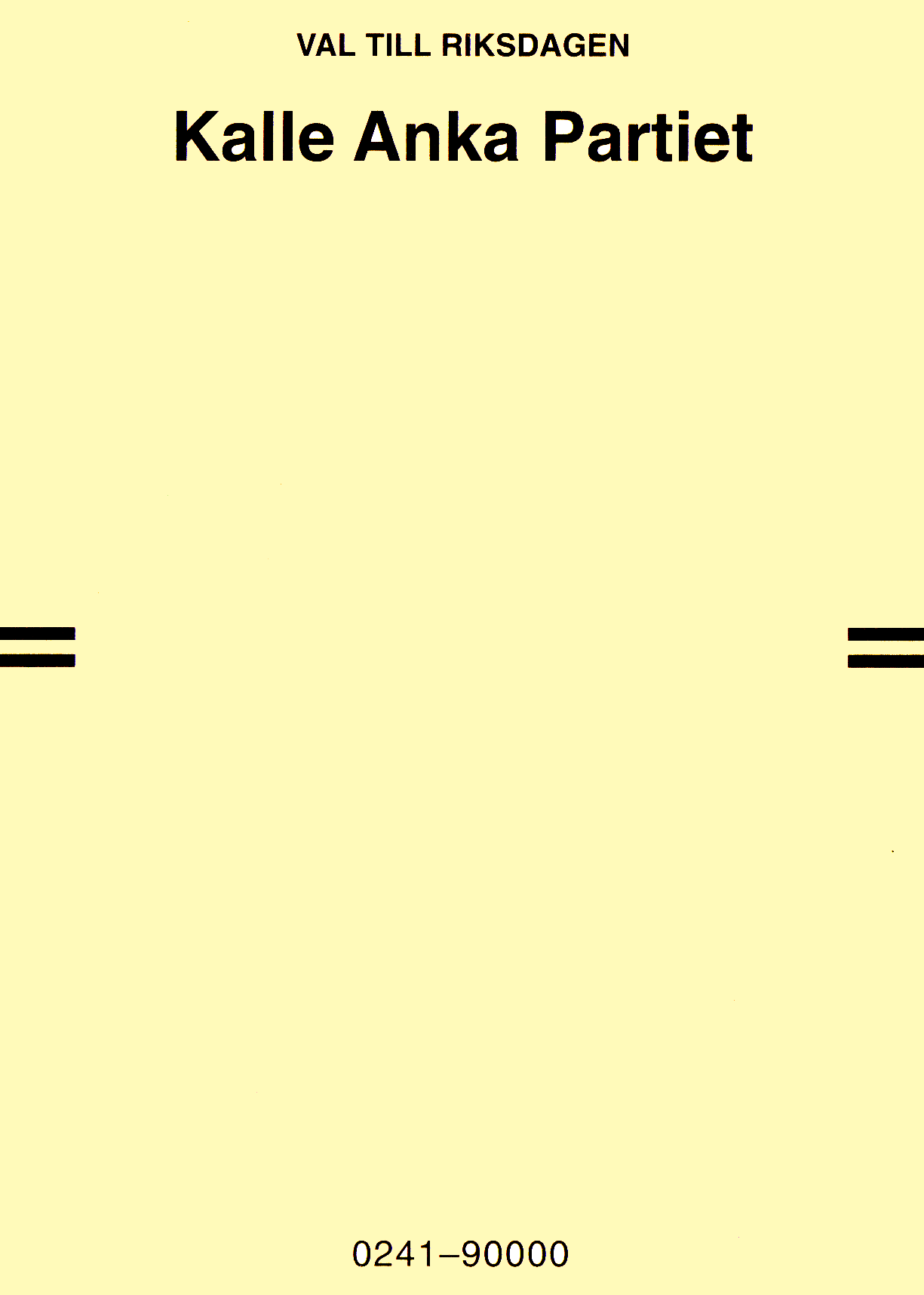
Voting slip for the Riksdag elections.

The Donald Duck Party (Swedish: Kalle Anka-partiet) is a Swedish joke political party named after the Disney character Donald Duck. The party has received joke or protest votes without actually existing for several years; however, before the 2002 Swedish general election, Malmö citizen Bosse Persson had ballots made for the party (as well as for several other frivolous parties). Contrary to popular belief, however, the party was never officially registered with the Election Authority.

In the 2002 national election, the party received 10 votes from pre-printed ballots and an unknown number of hand-written ballots. In the 2006 elections, the party (including all spellings) received 223 votes.

In the 2010 elections, the party received 167 votes.

In the 2014 elections, the party received 133 votes.

== See also ==
- List of frivolous political parties
- Mickey Mouse § Use in protest votes
