= Mats Rådberg =

Swedish country singer (1948–2020)

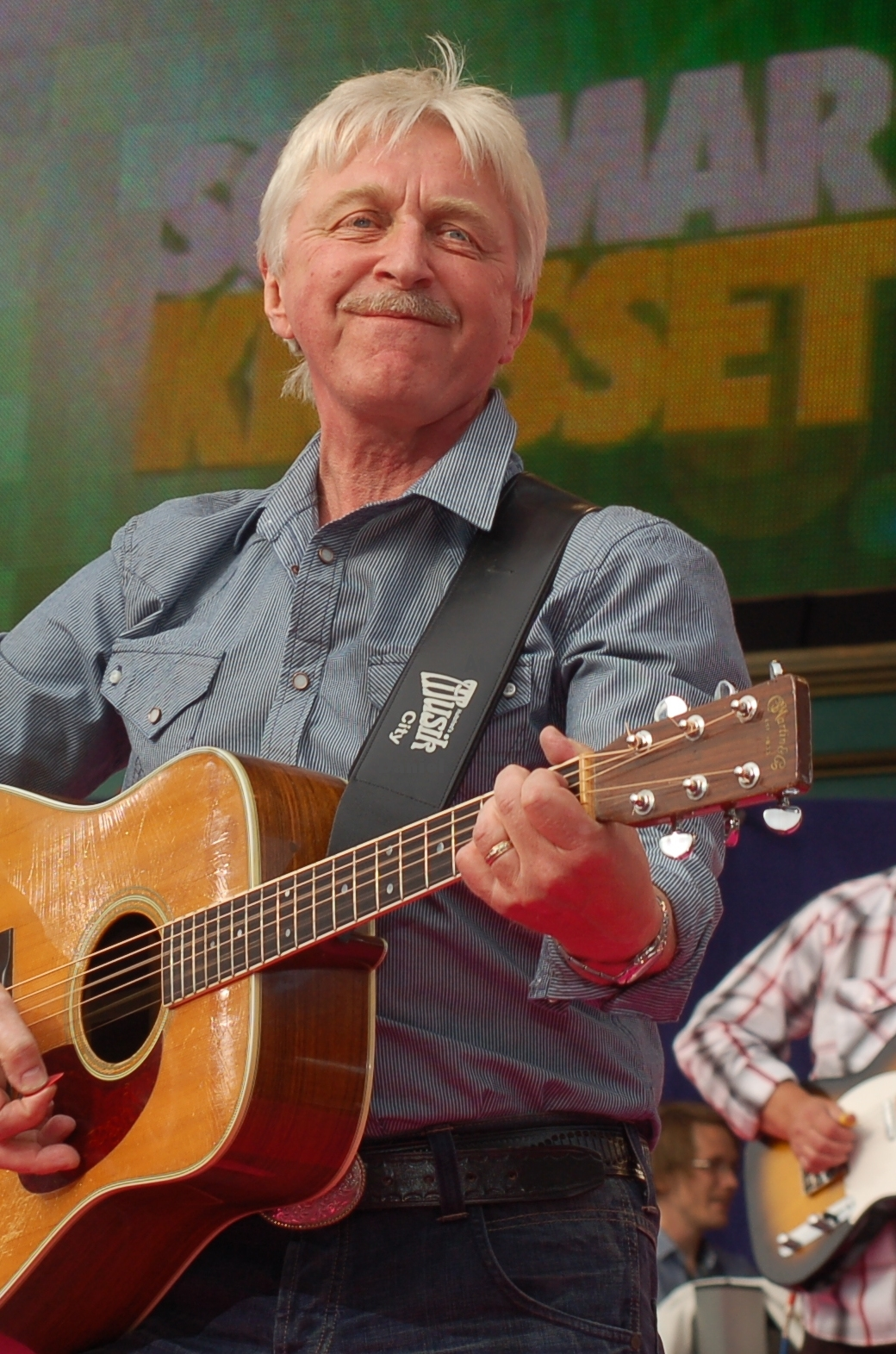

Background information
- Born: 8 June 1948; Stockholm, Sweden
- Died: 27 June 2020 (aged 72)
- Genre: country
- Occupations: Singer, musician, composer, architect
- Instrument: guitar
- Years active: 1969–2020

Mats Rådberg (8 June 1948 – 27 June 2020) was a Swedish country singer, guitarist, composer and architect scoring several chart successes in Sweden during the 1970s/80s. He is well known for working together with the country band Rankarna under the name Mats Rådberg & Rankarna. He also participated at Melodifestivalen 1977 with the song "Du och jag och sommaren", written by Tomas Ledin, which ended up 10th.

Rådberg also acted as a background singer behind Chips at Melodifestivalen 1980. In 1980, he released the album I'm the Singer, You're the Song together with Elisabeth Andreasson, and in 1983 he scored a hit with the song Peta in en pinne i brasan, a Swedish-language version of Shel Silverstein's Put Another Log on the Fire.

== Discography ==
=== Albums ===
- 1969 – Country Our Way (Rank Strangers)
- 1969 – Early Morning Rain (Rank Strangers; same as Country Our Way, released in Canada)
- 1970 – Rank Strangers (featuring Mats Rådberg)
- 1970 – Well Known Strangers (Mats Rådberg & Rankarna)
- 1975 – På egen hand
- 1975 – We Weren't Born in Tennessee (Mats Rådberg & Rankarna)
- 1976 – Min musik
- 1976 – The Best of Mats Rådberg
- 1977 – Mats Rådberg
- 1978 – Boogie
- 1979 – Det handlar om känslor
- 1980 – Mina bästa låtar
- 1980 – I'm the Singer, You're the Song
- 1980 – Some Broken Hearts Never Mend
- 1982 – Mamma, låt inte din grabb växa upp och bli en cowboy
- 1983 – Take Me to the Country
- 1984 – Familjens Svarta Får
- 1987 – Country Cookin'
- 1988 – Jag ger dig min morgon
- 1996 – When We Were Young
- 2002 – 100% Mats Rådberg & Rankarna
- 2014 – Nashville
