= Bosse Persson =

Swedish political figure

Bosse Persson (25 September 1941 – 9 June 2014) was a Swedish political figure who created several frivolous political parties in Sweden, the most famous of which being the Donald Duck Party. He was also known as "Malmö's own Santa Claus".
