= Då lyser en sol =

Song by Elisabeth Andreasson

from the album Angel of the Morning
- Language: Swedish
- Released: 1981
- Genre: Country pop
- Label: Mariann
- Songwriter: Lasse Holm
- Composer: Lasse Holm

"Då lyser en sol" is a Swedish language ballad, written in 1981 by Lasse Holm. In 1981, Elisabeth Andreasson recorded the song. The song text is, in an astronomical aspect, about the Sun and what it the Sun means for the life on Earth. The song text also describes how the dusk falls and the night arrives to the town. But it's also a love song about making a darling happy. The song is on the singer Elisabeth Andreassons 1981 album "Angel of the Morning". The song has later been sung by many artists, sometimes with a changed text. In 1986 Trygve Henrik Hoff wrote a Norwegian language text: Det skal lyse en sol, which Sissel Kyrkjebø sang. The Sissel Kyrkjebø version was on the Sveriges Radio hitlist Svensktoppen for 17 rounds, during the period 8 November 1987-6 March 1988, with 4th place as best result there.

The song was also recorded by Leif Bloms on 1983 album Leif Bloms jubileumsalbum 25 år and by the Streaplers on the 1985 album En så'n natt.
