= Gro Anita Schønn =

Norwegian singer

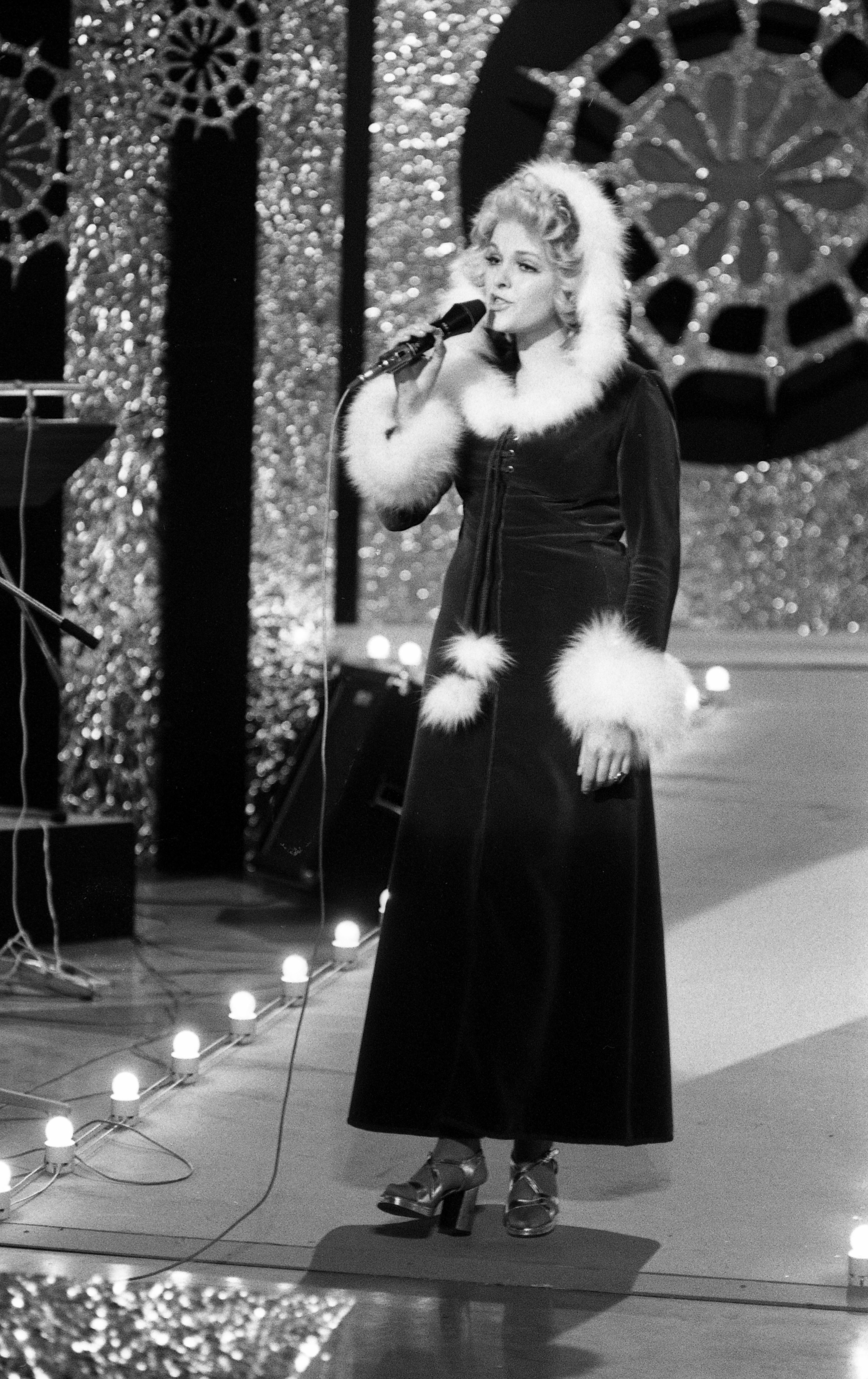
- Schønn performing in the 1974 Norwegian Melodi Grand Prix
- Born: 28 January 1950; Drammen, Norway
- Died: 24 April 2001 (aged 51)
- Occupation: Singer

Gro Anita Schønn (28 January 1950 – 24 April 2001) was a Norwegian singer.

Schønn was born in Drammen. She made her solo debut in 1967, and issued eight albums between 1970 and 1980. Among her song hits were En enkel sang om frihet from 1971, and Eviva España from 1973. Along with Inger Lise Rypdal and Stein Ingebrigtsen she formed the core of the musical trio Treff, which issued 21 cover albums in the 1970s. She died from pneumonia in 2001.
