= Haddy Njie =

Norwegian musician (born 1979)

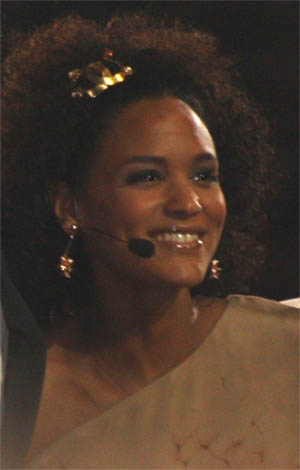
- Haddy Njie at the Eurovision Song Contest in Oslo (2010)

Background information
- Born: Haddy Jatou N'jie; 25 June 1979 (age 46); Oslo, Norway
- Occupations: Singer, songwriter, writer and journalist
- Years active: ?-present

Haddy Jatou Njie (formerly N'jie; born 25 June 1979) is a Norwegian singer, songwriter, writer and journalist. Her father is Gambian and her mother is Norwegian. She grew up in Kolbotn near Oslo and is the eldest of five siblings. Her younger sister is illustrator and picture book writer Lisa Aisato.

== Career ==
Njie has worked as a reporter for Dagsrevyen and is a columnist for Dagbladet. She hosted the Eurovision Song Contest 2010 with Erik Solbakken and Nadia Hasnaoui. She hosted the annual telethon on Norway's largest TV channel NRK 1 in 2009, 2010, 2011 and 2013.

When Norway held a national ceremony of remembrance on 21 August for the 77 victims of the worst attacks on the country since World War Two, the TV broadcast was hosted by Njie. She also hosted the one year memorial concert on 22 July 2012.

In 2011 she hosted the prestigious sports award show Idrettsgallaen from Hamar Olympic Amphitheatre together with Erik Solbakken and in 2012 and 2013 with Anne Rimmen. The show was broadcast on NRK.

Njie has toured Norway several times, both as a solo artist and as part of the comedy group Queendom, consisting of herself and four other black Norwegian women, all sharing in part African backgrounds. Much of the group's material lampoons either Norwegians or Africans.

In 2021, she competed on the Norwegian version of masked singer as the mermaid.

== Discography ==
Njie has released three solo albums:

- White Lies (released 16 September 2005)
- Welcome Home (released 1 June 2009)
- World of the Free (released 25 January 2010)

She is a contributor to

- Mitt lille land (2011), with other artists

== Personal life ==
After a twelve-year relationship, Njie married Fredrik Lyngås Pedersen in 2010. The couple ended their relationship in 2012.

In 2014, Njie confirmed that she and Labour Party politician Trond Giske were in a relationship. In September 2015, Njie announced that she was pregnant. She and Giske had a daughter in 2016.

Preceded by (Russia) Semi-finals: Natalia Vodianova and Andrey Malahov; Final: Alsou and Ivan Urgant	Eurovision Song Contest presenter 2010; With: Nadia Hasnaoui and Erik Solbakken	Succeeded by (Germany) Anke Engelke, Judith Rakers and Stefan Raab
