= Knut Stiklestad =

Norwegian opera singer (born 1948)

Knut Stiklestad (born 22 September 1948) is a Norwegian opera singer (bass). He has performed at the Norwegian National Opera and Ballet for many years, and at opera houses abroad, in Belgium, France, the Netherlands, and elsewhere. He has worked with Stein Winge, Bentein Baardson, and Wouter van Looy, among others. Stiklestad is also known for his work in church music. He has also cooperated with the composer Marcus Paus on work based on poems by Knut Hamsun.

== Discography ==
- Tonar i frå Trøndelag
- Toner fra Nidaros
- Det vilde kor by Knut Hamsun/Marcus Paus
- Peer Gynt, Malmö Symphonic Orchestra
