= Requiem (Paus) =

- by Marcus Paus
- Year: 2014
- Text: Ole Paus

Requiem is a chamber work for bass and piano based on the traditional Catholic requiem and written by Norwegian composer Marcus Paus with text by his father, Ole Paus. It was premièred in 2014 and included on the album Requiem/Trisyn/Læreren som ikke ble alongside The Teacher Who Was Not To Be.

The requiem consists of seven parts: Introitus, Graduale, Dies Irae, Offertorium, Agnus Dei, Libera Me and In Paradisum.
