= I evighet =

1996 song by Elisabeth Andreassen

Single by Elisabeth Andreassen
- Language: Norwegian
- Released: 1996
- Songwriter: Torhild Nigar

Eurovision Song Contest 1996 entry
- Country: Norway
- Artist: Elisabeth Andreassen
- Language: Norwegian
- Composer: Torhild Nigar
- Lyricist: Torhild Nigar
- Conductor: Frode Thingnæs

Finals performance
- Final result: 2nd
- Final points: 114

Entry chronology
- ◄ "Nocturne" (1995)
- "San Francisco" (1997) ►

"I evighet" (Norwegian pronunciation: [ɪ ˈêːvɪˌheːt]; "For eternity") is a song written by Torhild Nigar and performed by Elisabeth Andreassen. It represented Norway in the Eurovision Song Contest 1996. The song reached number 13 on the chart in Norway. In Israel, it peaked at number one for one week in August 1996.

It was performed twelfth on the night, following Estonia's Maarja-Liis Ilus and Ivo Linna with "Kaelakee hääl" and preceding France's Dan Ar Braz & L'Héritage des Celtes with "Diwanit bugale". At the close of voting, it had received 114 points, placing 2nd in a field of 23.

"I evighet" was translated into Swedish, with the lyrics being co-written by Torhild Nigar, Elisabeth Andreassen and Åsa Jinder and the title remaining the same. An English-language release (titled "Eternity") was also made.

In 1998, the song was re-written in German as "Wir sind dabei", as part of the hundredth anniversary celebrations for the German sporting federation. The re-titled "Wir sind dabei" was adopted as the official song of this celebration, held in Munich, with Andreassen performing it frequently and in a number of different language versions. This version is unique among the translations as it focuses on the positive aspects of sport, rather than the original theme of the eternity of love.

It was succeeded as Norwegian representative at the 1997 contest by Tor Endresen with "San Francisco".

== Charts ==
Chart (1996)	Peak position
Israel (Israeli Singles Chart)	1
Norway (VG-lista)	13
