= Ole Paus =

Norwegian recording artist, musician, songwriter (1947–2023)

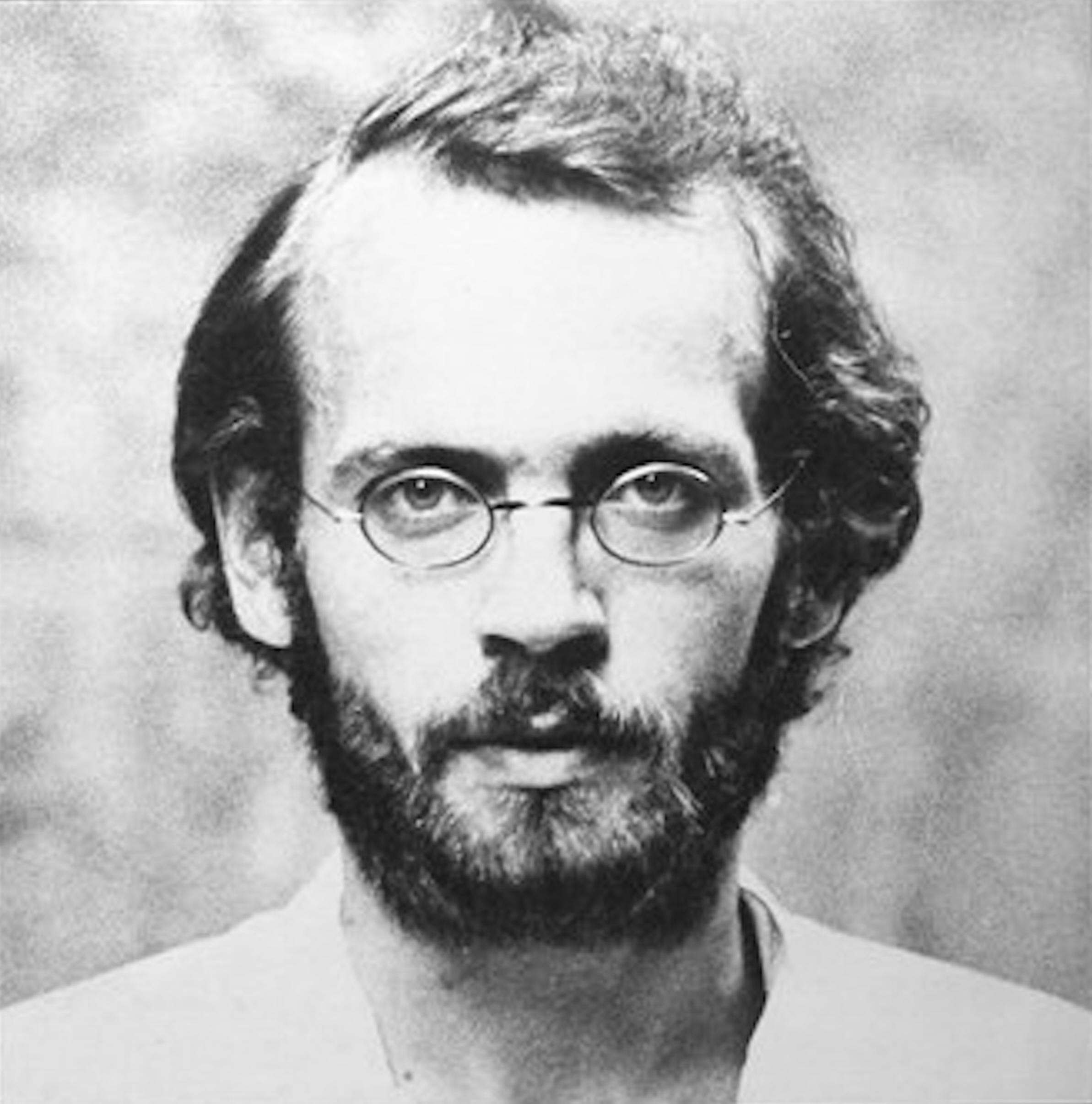
- Paus in 1977

Background information
- Born: Ole Christian Paus; 9 February 1947; Oslo, Norway
- Died: 12 December 2023 (aged 76) Drammen, Norway
- Occupations: Musician, singer-songwriter, writer
- Instruments: Vocals, guitar
- Years active: 1970–2016

Ole Paus (9 February 1947 – 12 December 2023) was a Norwegian singer-songwriter and poet, widely regarded as one of the most innovative Norwegian musical figures of the 20th century and "Norway's most significant troubadour at the time of his death." Emerging during the Norwegian ballad revival (Norwegian: visebølgen), Paus was instrumental in defining the genre's direction. Over a career spanning five decades, he released around 40 albums, authored novels, poetry collections, and travelogues. His works spanned from protest songs and satirical ballads to deeply reflective hymns and love songs. He was seen as not merely a musician but a cultural provocateur, using song as a vehicle for political and philosophical exploration. Paus was known for his distinctive individualism, social criticism, and rebellious stance, standing "fearlessly up for the weakest against the powers that be." Often called Norway's "national troubadour," his song "Mitt lille land" became a unifying anthem after the 2011 Norway attacks.

Born in Oslo into an aristocratic family with close ties to Henrik Ibsen, Paus grew up as the son of a general in a sometimes dysfunctional family marked by loss, anxiety, upheaval, and emotional distance. After his mother's early death he was raised by his grandmother Ella, who had come to Norway as a Jewish refugee from Vienna in 1938. In 1967, he started performing as a singer-songwriter in Oslo, a profession that "did not exist at the time," and was discovered in 1969 by Alf Prøysen and Alf Cranner.

His recording debut came in 1970 with Der ute – der inne, featuring 18 songs about urban life in Oslo. Encouraged by Prøysen, he published the poetry collection Tekster fra en trapp the following year. His early albums blended influences from folk, jazz, and rock, characterized by sharp social critique and deep empathy for society's outcasts, marginalized, and lonely—"all of us who couldn't cope with existence," as expressed in songs like "Jacobs vise," "Merkelige Mira," "Blues for Pyttsan Jespersens pårørende," and "Kajsas sang." Throughout the 1970s, he collaborated with notable artists, including Jens Bjørneboe and Ketil Bjørnstad, creating works that transcended traditional genres. His biting satire found a platform in the Paus-posten series, cementing his reputation as a cultural provocateur.

In later years, Paus focused on more contemplative and spiritual themes. His collaborations with the Church Cultural Workshop produced notable hymn interpretations, and his song "Innerst i sjelen" became a Norwegian classic. Working alongside his son, classical composer Marcus Paus, he ventured into opera, oratorio, and avant-garde music. Alexander Z. Ibsen—of no relation—noted that "Ole Paus held a unique position among Norwegian artists. The songs he wrote touched many, ranging from contemplative hymns to satirical ballads. In light of his many active years and his genre-crossing work, he must be considered Norway's most significant troubadour at the time of his death," while Håvard Rem called him Norway's first singer-songwriter. His posthumously published memoir For en mann (2024) reveals an artist whose life and work defied easy categorization.

== Background ==
A member of the Paus family, Ole Paus was born in Oslo in 1947 and was the son of General Ole Paus. He was the father of composer Marcus Paus. He was a close relative of Henrik Ibsen. On Ibsen, Paus said: "I am fascinated by the mix of being a complete rebel and utterly bourgeois in Ibsen. He speaks both the language of the high bourgeoisie and the anarchistic language without an accent. Impressive."

Paus died in Drammen on 12 December 2023, at the age of 76.

== Career ==
Ole Paus debuted as a singer-songwriter in 1970 and as an author the following year, after he was discovered by Alf Cranner and Alf Prøysen, respectively. He was one of the central figures of the so-called visebølgen i Norge, i.e. troubadours in the tradition of Evert Taube, Cornelis Vreeswijk and others.

His works are marked by critical and socially conscious songwriting. His works often commented on political and societal issues. As a young adult, Ole Paus initially had a clear affiliation with the political right, but eventually adopted a more independent stance in the cultural landscape of the 1970s. Paus was often perceived as a "bourgeois anarchist" who challenged authority and societal norms from the unique position of being both insider and outsider in Norway's "establishment". Jon-Roar Bjørkvold described him as "the bourgeoisie's scolder and tireless enfant terrible." Bjarne Markussen referred to Ole Paus as "the last bohemian," noting that he shared with Jens Bjørneboe a mix of radicalism and conservatism, speaking against state power and defending vulnerable and marginalized individuals. During the 1970s and 1980s, Paus was known for his biting social commentary, especially in his ironic and sometimes libellous "musical newspapers" in the form of broadside ballads in a series of albums titled "The Paus Post". His social and political commentary aimed at both left and right in the political spectrum and Paus was described as a man whose satirical lyrics managed to enrage both communists and Christian conservatives.

His later works become known for a softer and more lyrical style, and include songs such as "Innerst i sjelen" and "Engler i sneen". He has often collaborated with Ketil Bjørnstad, notably on the "modern suite" Leve Patagonia; he has later collaborated with Kirkelig Kulturverksted on several projects, and with his son, the classical composer Marcus Paus, notably on the children's opera The Witches, Requiem and several later works. One of his songs, "Mitt lille land", gained wide popularity after the 2011 Norway attacks and was described as "the new national anthem". He has been described as the Norwegian counterpart of Bob Dylan and as the "voice of the nation." Paus was discovered by artists Alf Cranner and Alf Prøysen, and was mentored by André Bjerke, Jens Bjørneboe and Henny Moan. Paus is noted for his consistent use of Norwegian and has been eager for other Norwegian musicians to switch from English to Norwegian.

Hans-Olav Thyvold stated that Paus "became, par excellence, the best Norwegian lyricist" and the leading figure in the Norwegian ballad revival. Thyvold also said that Paus, like Wergeland, was "a Norwegian artist held back by being Norwegian, and had he, a man of such talent, been born into the French or English language tradition, Ole Paus would have been a global name on par with Leonard Cohen, Nick Cave, and Bob Dylan." Thyvold further remarked that Paus' significance for Norwegian-language music cannot be overstated and that he created the space in which "the four great" rock bands—DumDum Boys, Jokke & Valentinerne, deLillos, and Raga Rockers—operated: "Ole Paus challenges you to do it in your own language, but at the same time, he sets the bar very, very high." Thyvold stated that Paus' abilities as a lyricist have, to some extent, overshadowed the fact that he is also a great melodist, and that his songs have a universal appeal beyond their Norwegian context.

== Books ==
- Tekster fra en trapp (1971)
- Det går en narr gjennom byen med ringlende bjeller (1974)
- Endelig alene (1984)
- Milunia (1985)
- Hjemmevant utenfor (1994)
- Reisen til Gallia (1998) (with Ketil Bjørnstad)
- Kjære Kongen (2002)
- Blomstene ved Amras (2004)
- Isengaard (2006)

Reviews

- Ikke gjør som mora di sier (1987)
- For fattig og rik (1988)
- Norge mitt Norge (1991)
- Sammen igjen (1992)

== Discography ==
=== Albums ===
(For peak charting positions, see NorwegianCharts.com)

- Der ute - der inne (1970)
- Garman (1972)
- Blues for Pyttsan Jespersens pårørende (1973)
- Ole Bull Show (with Gunnar Bull Gundersen) (1973)
- Zarepta (1974)
- Lise Madsen, Moses og de andre (with Ketil Bjørnstad) (1975)
- I anstendighetens navn (1976)
- Paus-posten (1977)
- Nye Paus-posten (1977)
- Sjikaner i utvalg (1978)
- Kjellersanger (1979)
- Noen der oppe (1982)
- Bjørnstad/Paus/Hamsun (with Ketil Bjørnstad) (1982)
- Svarte ringer (1982)
- Grensevakt (1984)
- Muggen manna (1986)
- Stjerner i rennesteinen (1989)
- Salmer på veien hjem (with Kari Bremnes og Mari Boine)(1991)
- Biggles' testamente (1992)
- Mitt lille land (1994)
- Hva hjertet ser (1995)
- Stopp pressen! Det grøvste fra Paus-posten (1995)
- To rustne herrer (with Jonas Fjeld) (1996)
- Pausposten Extra! (1996)
- Det begynner å bli et liv(1998)
- Damebesøk (with Jonas Fjeld) (1998)
- Den velsignede (2000)
- Kildens bredd (with Ketil Bjørnstad) (2002)
- Tolv rustne strenger (with Jonas Fjeld) (2003)
- En bøtte med lys (2004)
- Sanger fra et hvitmalt gjerde i sjelen (2005)
- Hellige natt - Jul i Skippergata (2006)
- Den store norske sangboka (2007)
- Paus synger Paus (2009)
- Dugnad for Haiti – Live fra Operaen (2010), with other artists
- Mitt lille land (2011), with other artists
- 20 av de beste sangene, vol 1 (2013)
- Avslutningen (2013)
- Frolandia (2015) with Ketil Bjørnstad
- Sanger fra gutterommet (2016)
- Hvis helsa holder - The Album (2016) with Jonas Fjeld
- Så nær, så nær (2020) with Motorpsycho and Reine Fiske

=== Songs ===
- "I en sofa fra IKEA"
- "Innerst i sjelen"
- "Mitt lille land" (Peaked at #4 in VG-lista Norwegian Singles Chart)

=== Opera ===
- Heksene (2007) (libretto)

== Filmography ==
- Inntrengeren, (1974) – history of Ole Paus in a TV-series Et lite grøss?
- Solstreif, (1980) - as author
- De blå ulvene as guest (1993)
- Bikinisesongen as Robert (1994)
- Upperdog as Axel's father (2009)

TV Specials host

- På tide med Ole Paus - TV series presenter (1992–1993, produced by Lasse Halberg and Petter Wallace on TV3)
- Hjemme hos Paus - TV series presenter with Elsa Lystad (1994, produced by Petter Wallace on TV2)
- Ute med Paus TV series presenter (1995 produced by Petter Wallace on TV2)

== Honours and awards ==
- Spellemannprisen, Årets Viseplate (This Year's Folk Song Album), 1976
- Gammleng-prisen, 1995
- Spellemannprisen, Juryens Hederspris (The Jury's Honorary Award), 1998
- Lytterprisen, 1999
- Alf Prøysens Ærespris, 2001,
- Spellemannprisen, Årets Spellemann (Spellemann of the Year), 2013
- Commander of the Order of St. Olav, 2022

== See also ==
- Impact of Alf Prøysen's sexual identity in song lyrics

Awards
Preceded by Kaizers Orchestra	Recipient of the Spellemannprisen as This year's Spellemann; 2013	Succeeded by Nico & Vinz
