= Jan Werner Danielsen =

Norwegian singer (1976–2006)

- Born: Jan Werner Danielsen; 10 April 1976; Nord-Odal, Norway
- Origin: Oslo, Norway
- Died: 28 September 2006 (aged 30) Oslo, Norway
- Genres: Pop, Rock, Classical
- Occupation: Singer
- Years active: 1988–2006

Jan Werner Danielsen, known professionally as Jan Werner, (10 April 1976 – 28 September 2006) was a Norwegian pop singer, also known for his interpretations of musical, classical, and rock standards. He was famous for his powerful voice which stretched over four and a half octaves. His breakthrough came after winning two important talent contests, most notably on national television in the show Talentiaden (NRK) in 1994. The same year, he represented Norway at the Eurovision Song Contest, with Elisabeth Andreasson.

He was one of the most popular and highest-selling recording artists in Norway at his death at the age of 30.

== Childhood star ==
Jan Werner Danielsen was born in Nord-Odal Municipality in Norway in 1976. He was particularly known for his interpretations of popular musical hits and his voice, which stretched nearly five octaves. He started very early to sing songs by Barbra Streisand and he wanted to sing like her. Danielsen won his first talent show in 1988, at the age of twelve; the prize was a record deal and he released the single "Jeg Ser En Dag" (I See The Day). Then he had already been singing for two-thirds of his lifetime, as his first public appearance in a musical setting was at the age of four. He became widely noticed when he was appearing and singing in the popular youth program called Midt I Smørøyet on Norwegian Television NRK with "Somewhere" and between 1988 and 1993 he sang regularly with the Hamar Symphony Orchestra. In 1992 Jan Werner got his second record deal, and was also included in plans for the cultural events around the Olympic Winter Games in Lillehammer, Norway in February 1994.

== Commercial success ==
Danielsen broke through as a national celebrity and artist in 1994. He participated and won the national talent competition Talentiaden on NRK television with the song "The Right to Sing" and "Anthem" from Chess and received the first ever Olympic medal that was awarded the Olympics in Lillehammer in 1994. The same year he represented Norway at the Eurovision Song Contest, with Elisabeth Andreasson, where they had a sixth place with the song Duett. In 2000, Jan Werner again was part of the Norwegian final of Eurovision and this time alone. He came in second place with the song "One More Time".

Jan Werner debuted as an adult-recording artist in the 1995 with the album All by Myself, which went gold. Inner Secrets, his second album, came two years later in 1997. It sold 14 000 copies and contained some self-written compositions and a duet with Karin Krog. The third, Music of the Night came in 1999 with interpretations of songs from musicals such as Chess, West Side Story, and Les Misérables. His fourth, Singer of Songs (2003) is the best selling with over 120,000 copies and it became his biggest seller to date. It reached second place on the national album chart. The fifth and final album, Stronger, was released after his death on 13 November 2006.

Jan Werner has participated in many musical contexts, from pop to classical, from Christmas carols to musical songs. He has interpreted the classics such as Johann Sebastian Bach (Air), and he has made his own songs and melodies. He has performed with artists such as Benedicte Adrian, Secret Garden, Sølvguttene, Tommy Körberg, Øivind Blunck, Outer Suløens Jass-ensemble, and last but not least the Swede Robert Wells in the Royal Albert Hall in 2003. That was a personal highlight of his career and he was singing "Air" by Johann Sebastian Bach. He also performed that song on the Nobel Peace Prize Concert in December this year. In addition, he toured as the artistic director of Dissimilis.

Elisabeth Andreassen and Jan Werner continued to work after their duet under the Eurovision in 1994. From 1997 they held Christmas concerts all over Norway, and in the summer of 1999 they recorded an album in the Uranienborg Church (Oslo) with selected tracks from the same tour. On the Christmas-concert tour in 2004 he now was a solo artist and the Norwegian Bishop Rosemarie Köhn was with him on selected concerts. Jan Werner has sold a total of nearly 1 million copies in Norway, a country with just 4.6 million people and over one million concert tickets.

In September 2006, only a week before his death, Jan Werner and his manager were in Canada to put business plans in conjunction with Jan Werner's international career. This included a springtour with The Canadian Tenors in 2007. In May 2007, The Canadian Tenors held a mini-tour in Norway, with a concert-tribute to Jan Werner. They wanted to pay tribute to Jan Werner in his own way and they also recorded his version of "Always There" (from "Stronger"), for their CD "The Canadian Tenors" in 2009.

== Personal life ==
Throughout his career, Jan Werner's sexual orientation was the subject of much talk and many rumors. Jan Werner never gave a clear answer when reporters asked about this. But in the book published in 2007, Werner's father Thor Egil Danielsen says that Jan Werner was not bisexual, gay or heterosexual. "Werner's unresolved sexual orientation characterized his life. It was problematic for him. He never took any final choice between women and men, simply because he could not. It was the truth, that the press was always looking for. He told us that it had nothing to do with gender, but that he fell in love with people," writes his father in the book.

== Death ==
On 28 September 2006, Danielsen's friend and manager Febe Rognstad found him dead in his Oslo flat. The news caused an outpouring of grief in the Norwegian entertainment industry. His family denied rumors about his death being the result of a suicide. At the time he had recently finished a new album, Stronger, which, in accordance with the wishes of his family, was released as planned. It went on to become a huge success, selling 63,000 copies in its opening week alone, reaching number one in the Norwegian chart "VG-lista".

At his funeral the church was packed with colleagues and celebrities, the highlight being his former duet partner Elisabeth Andreassen performing "You Raise Me Up" together with a recording of Danielsen's voice, accompanied by the song's composer Rolf Løvland on piano. The mourners responded with a standing ovation. He was buried in Sand Church in Nord-Odal. The family wanted to have the memory ceremony in Oslo because Sand church is not large enough to accommodate all who wanted to show the deceased artist one last honor.

The result of the autopsy was finally ready in early January 2007. It appears that Danielsen's death was caused by heart failure, most likely as a result of an inflammation of the bronchi of the lungs, combined with physical fatigue after a period with too much work.

== Releases after his death ==
In November 2006, the controversial biography of Jan Werner Danielsen – "Just Werner" penned by his father, Thor-Egil Danielsen was released. Christmas 2007, his family released, in cooperation with Salvation Army, the Christmas album Eg Veit I Himmerik Ei Borg with previously unreleased live-recordings from various concerts and TV appearances.

On 22 November 2010, the double-album One More Time – The Very Best Of, with several new and unknown recording came out. These recordings were found by Jan Werner's family after his death and released in cooperation with Universal Music. This album was received very well among both critics and audiences.

== Discography ==
=== Albums ===
- All by Myself (1995)
- Inner Secrets (1997)
- Music of the Night (1998)
- Bettan & Jan Werners jul (1999)
- Over the Rainbow and Other Musical Highlights (2000 with Bettan)
- Singer Of Songs (2003)
- Stronger (2006)
- Eg veit i himmelrik ei borg – Salvation Army Christmas Album 2007 (2007)
- One More Time – The Very Best Of (2010)

=== Singles ===
- "Jeg ser en dag/My Prayer" – Debut-radiosingle (1989)
- "Duett" – Duet with Elisabeth Andreassen (1994)
- "Time Will Let You Know" (1995)
- "Carry Me/All by Myself" (1995)
- "Step Out" (1997)
- "Halde deg inntil meg" – Duet with Malin Holberg (1997)
- "Come Back to Me" (1997)
- "Inner Secrets" (1997)
- "Find Your Way" (1997)
- "Friend" – Duet med Karin Krog (1997)
- "One Night in Bangkok" (1998)
- "Bonne chance à France" – Official European Fotbalcup-single med Synnøve Svabø (1998)
- "Anthem" – Radio Version (1998)
- "Here for You" (1998)
- "One More Time" (2000)
- "Half a World Away" with Secret Garden (2005)
- "Always There" originally by Secret Garden and Russell Watson (2005)

=== Other ===
- Singing the song "He Lives in You" ("Han Bor I Oss") in the Norwegian version of The Lion King 2 movie (1998)
- Singing the official "Brannmann Sam" song ("Fireman Sam") for his nephew Filip's birthday (2004)
- Singing "Mary Did You Know?" on the Gospel-album with the Norwegian gospel-choir Mosaic (2005)

== Television (selection) ==
- Midt i smørøyet (TV) – NRK (1988) (Guest Appearance)
- Rett hjem (TV) – NRK (1994) (Guest Appearance)
- Talentiaden 1994 (TV) – NRK (1994)
- Melodi Grand Prix 1994 (TV) (with Elisabeth Andreassen) – NRK (1994)
- Vindu mot Lillehammer (TV) – NRK (1994) (Guest Appearance)
- NyttårsRondo (TV) – NRK (1994) (Guest Appearance)
- Du skal høre mye (TV) – NRK (199?) (Guest Appearance)
- Pick-up (TV) – NRK (1997) (Guest Appearance)
- XLTV (TV) – NRK (1997?) (Guest Appearance)
- Åpen post (TV) – NRK (1999) (Guest Appearance)
- Beat for beat (TV) (with Benedicte Adrian) – NRK (2000?) (Guest Appearance)
- Mine damer og herrer (TV) (with Elisabeth Andreassen) – TV2 (2000?) (Guest Appearance)
- Melodi Grand Prix 2000 (TV) – NRK (2000)
- Først og sist (TV) – NRK (2000) (Guest Appearance)
- Retro (TV) – (with Grethe Svendsen) NRK (2000?) (Guest Appearance)
- Numme og Gunstrøm – før og nå (TV) – TV2 (2001) (Guest Appearance)
- Nobel Peace Prize Concert 2003 (TV) – NRK (2003)
- Frelsesarmeens julekonsert 2003 (TV) – NRK (2003)
- Fra Halvsju til Reser – Stjernefabrikken 25 år (TV) – NRK (2004) (Guest Appearance)
- Senkveld med Thomas og Harald (TV) – TV2 (2005?) (Guest Appearance)
- Med rett til å synge (TV) – NRK (2006)
- Tommy and Jan Werner – The Show – DVD (2006)

Preceded by Silje Vige with "Alle mine tankar"	Norway in the Eurovision Song Contest; 1994	Succeeded by Secret Garden with "Nocturne"
