= Bobbysocks =

Norwegian pop duo

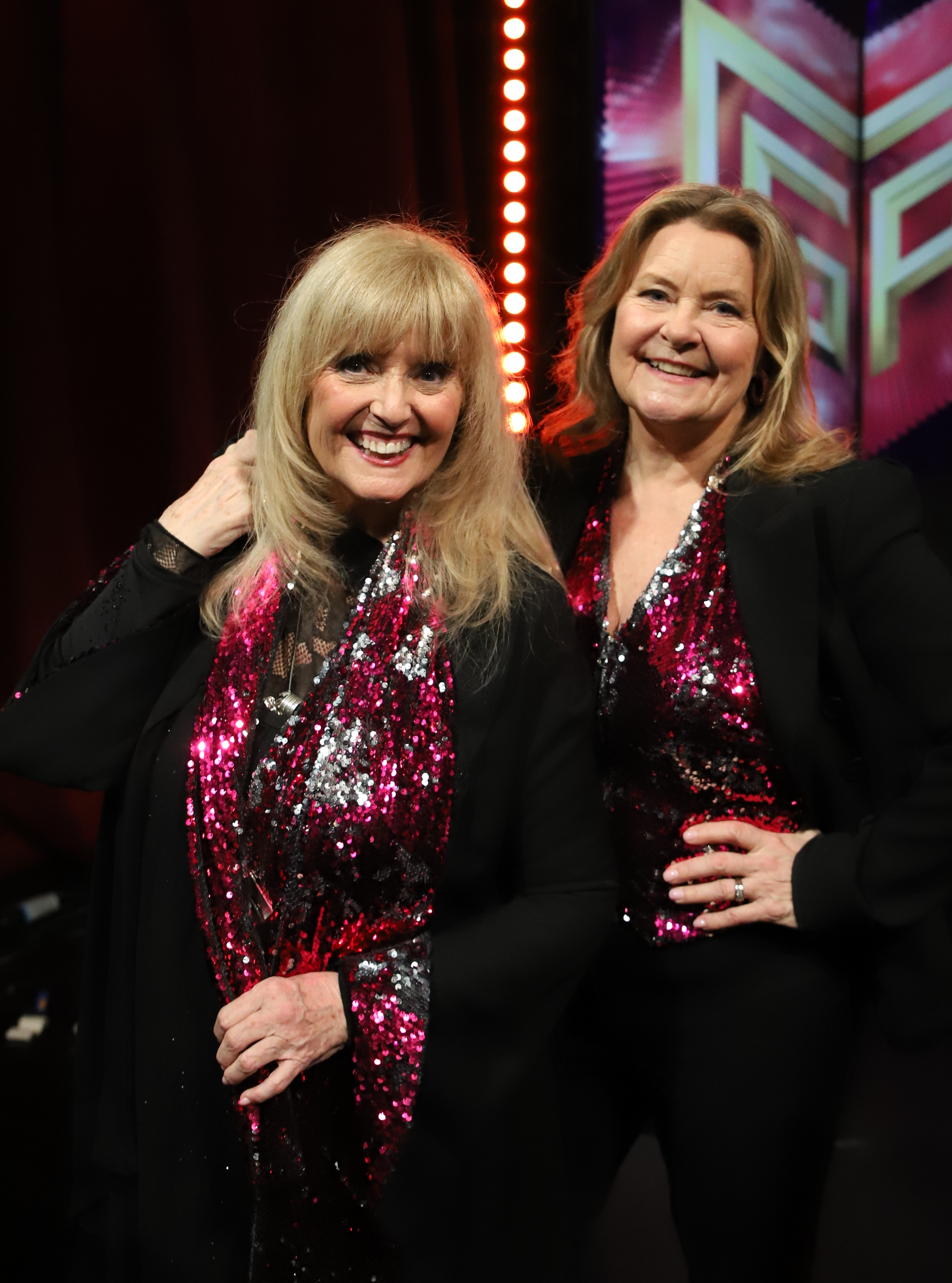
- Bobbysocks in January 2025

Background information
- Origin: Norway
- Genres: Pop music; Europop; schlager
- Years active: 1983–1988, 2010–present
- Labels: Bahama; Sonet
- Members: Hanne Krogh; Elisabeth Andreassen
- Website: hannekrogh.com/bobbysocks/

Bobbysocks is a Norwegian pop duo consisting of Norwegian Hanne Krogh and Swedish-Norwegian Elisabeth Andreassen. They won the Eurovision Song Contest 1985 with the song "La det swinge" ("Let it swing"). Elisabeth went by the surname Andreasson until 1994.

== History ==
=== 1980s ===
The duo was formed in 1983. Both Krogh and Andreassen were frequent Eurovision contestants. Krogh has appeared three times, all for Norway: in 1971 as a soloist, with Bobbysocks in 1985 and as part of Just 4 Fun in 1991. Andreassen sang for Sweden as one half of Chips in 1982 and after winning with Bobbysocks, teamed up with Jan Werner Danielsen in 1994 and sang solo in 1996. According to John Kennedy O'Connor's The Eurovision Song Contest - The Official History Andreassen is one of only five lead artists to sing in the contest on four occasions and is also one of only four artists to finish both first and second in Eurovision (1985 & 1996).

The duo's debut single was "I Don't Wanna Break My Heart" (1984), released in a pink colored vinyl. The concept behind Bobbysocks! was to bring up-to-date songs from the 1950s with a swing mood, adding them a "modern" 1980s sound. That idea was fully applied on their first LP Bobbysocks!, which was a mixture of covers and brand new songs.

The scheduled next single was going to be "Radio", but the plans were changed when the duo won the Eurovision Song Contest. "Let It Swing" topped the Norwegian singles chart, as well as it did in Belgium. It was a Top 10 in Sweden and Ireland, and a Top 20 in The Netherlands and Austria. It entered the UK Singles Chart on 25 May 1985, and rose to a high of No. 44; it remained in the charts for four weeks. It was also pressed in countries such as Germany, Japan and Australia.

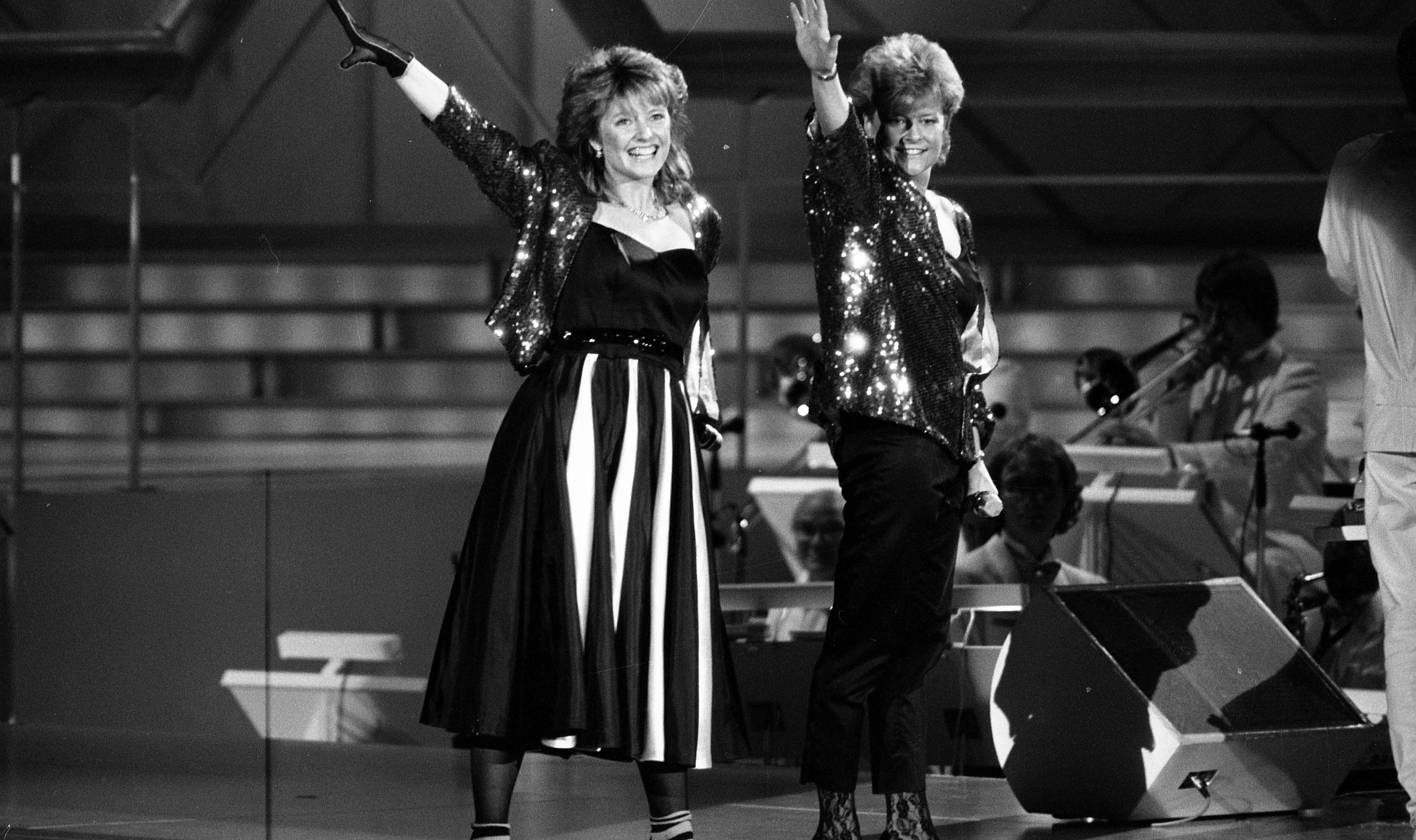
Bobbysocks at Eurovision in 1985

In 1985, due to their ESC victory, Bobbysocks! were awarded the Peer Gynt Prize, which is awarded by the Stortinget, Norway's parliament.

Another ESC consequence was the re-release of the Bobbysocks! LP with "Let It Swing" on it, reaching the gold status. Their next album, Waiting for the Morning, was released in April 1986, preceded by the single of the same name, both becoming a success in Norway, peaking at number 1 on the Norwegian singles and album charts. Walkin' on Air, was recorded in Los Angeles in 1987 and produced by Bill Maxwell. It went gold in only four days, becoming their third and final LP. Just before the release of "If I Fall", the album's lead single in Norway, the duo wanted to do something "decently crazy" as they revealed at the time, so they did a cover of "Swing it, magister'n", a song from 1940 originally sung by the Swedish singer and actress Alice Babs, releasing it as single in the summer of 1987.

In 1988, Bobbysocks disbanded, after four successful years.

=== 21st century ===
Krogh and Andreassen still appeared from time to time together on stage in Norway. They appeared at Congratulations, the 50th anniversary Eurovision concert in Copenhagen, Denmark, in October 2005, and Eurovision Song Contest's Greatest Hits, the 60th anniversary concert in London. In May 2010, Bobbysocks did a short comeback to celebrate their 25th anniversary since their ESC victory in 1985, launching a compilation album called Let It Swing - The Best Of Bobbysocks!, which included two newly recorded songs and peaking at number 13 on the Norwegian albums chart.

On 16 January 2025 they were announced as one of 9 finalists in Melodi Grand Prix 2025 with the song "Joyful". In the final on 15 February, Bobbysocks finished in third place with 164 points, coming second in the public televote.

== Discography ==
=== Albums ===
Album Title	Album details	Peak chart positions	
Album Title	Album details	NOR	SWE
Bobbysocks!	Released: October 1984; Format: LP, CS, CD; Labels: Bahama Records	3	-
Waiting for the Morning	Released: 14 April 1986; Format: LP, CS, CD; Labels: Sonet	1	50
Walkin' on Air	Released: September 1987; Format: LP, CS, CD; Labels: Sonet	16	-

=== Compilation albums ===
- 2010: Let it Swing - The Best of Bobbysocks!

=== Singles ===
- 1984: "I Don't Wanna Break My Heart"
- 1984: "Radio" (re-released in 1985)
- 1985: "Let It Swing" / "La Det Swinge" NOR #1
- 1986: "Waiting for the Morning" NOR #1
- 1987: "Swing It, Magister'n"
- 1987: "If I Fall"
- 1987: "Don't Leave Me Here Without You"
- 2010: "Boogie Woogie Mama" (feat. Vidar Busk)
- 2025: "Joyful" (Melodi Grand Prix 2025)

== See also ==
- ABBA
- Europride
- Eurovision Song Contest 1985
- Melodi Grand Prix
- Melodifestivalen

Awards and achievements
Preceded by (Sweden) Herreys with "Diggi-Loo Diggi-Ley"	Winner of the Eurovision Song Contest; 1985	Succeeded by (Belgium) Sandra Kim with "J'aime la vie"
Preceded by Dollie de Luxe with "Lenge leve livet"	Norway in the Eurovision Song Contest; 1985	Succeeded by Ketil Stokkan with "Romeo"
