= Norsktoppen =

Musical hit list radio programme

- Genre: Record chart
- Country of origin: Norway
- Language(s): Norwegian
- Home station: NRK Radio
- Original release: 20 January 1973 – 20 December 1986

Norsktoppen was a musical hit list at NRK Radio, originally playing songs exclusively by Norwegian artists. Until 1986, the songs had to be in the Norwegian language. Norsktoppen started airing in 1973, once a week. Norsktoppen was canceled on 1 January 2009. This decision—to close down the show as outdated—raised some public debate, including an interpellation in the Storting raised by representative Ulf Erik Knudsen to the minister of culture. As only songs with Norwegian artists were included, Norsktoppen came to be an important tool for the Norwegian recording industry.
