= Ketil Stokkan =

Norwegian pop artist (born 1956)

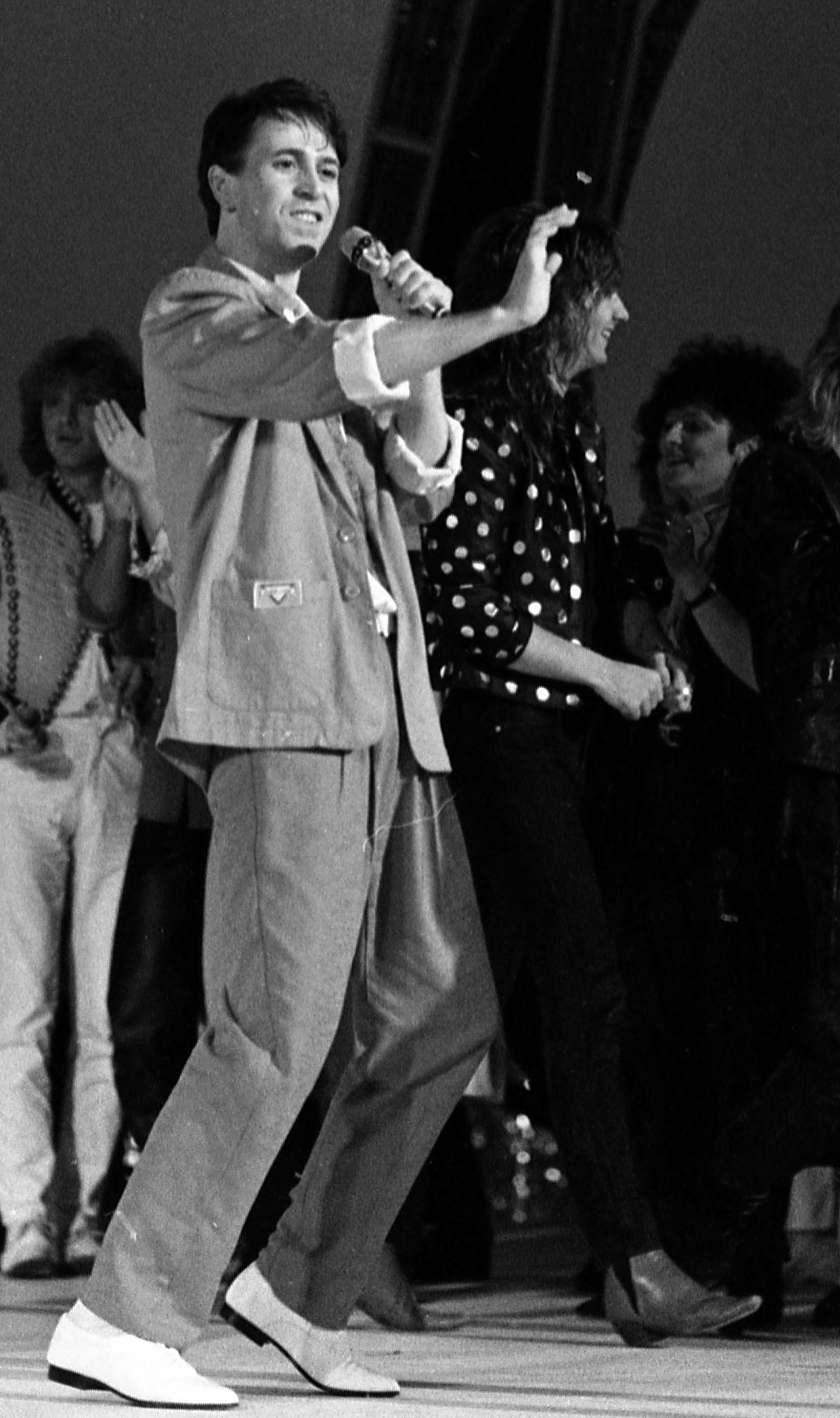

Background information
- Genres: pop
- Formerly of: Zoo

Ketil Stokkan (born 29 April 1956) is a Norwegian pop artist who has performed as solo artist as well as the singer in the Norwegian band Zoo.

Stokkan was born in Harstad. In 1983 he participated in the Norwegian qualifying heat for Eurovision with the song "Samme charmeur" which was placed second. In 1986 he won the national Melodi Grand Prix with the song "Romeo", written by himself, which came 12th on homeground in the Eurovision Song Contest final, which that year was held in Bergen, Norway. In 1990 he won the national final again with the song "Brandenburger Tor", the song ended up last tied with Finland. Stokkan now works as a school teacher in Nordkjosbotn in Balsfjord Municipality.

Stokkan is also an outspoken Odd Fellow.

Stokkan also participated in Melodi Grand Prix 2021 with the song "My Life Is OK".

== Discography ==
=== Zoo ===
- 1978 – Captured in Zoo
- 1978 – Guilty
- 1979 – Noregs heitaste
- 1980 – Z på maken
- 1981 – Gaya
- 1982 – Shagalai
- 1994 – Zoobra
- 2000 – Evig ung

=== Solo ===
- 1983 – Samme charmeur (single)
- 1984 – Gentlemen's agreement
- 1985 – Ekte mannfolk
- 1986 – Romeo
- 1988 – Øyan dine (single)
- 1989 – Nexus – Back to my roots (single)
- 1990 – Stokkan Band – Brandenburger Tor (single)
- 1991 – Stokkan Band – Beina på jorda (single)
- 1994 – Stokkan – To the bone
- 1996 – All that blues from Norway (Samle-CD/Div. Art.)
- 1998 – Æ e` Nordlending (Samle-CD/Din NN-Art)
- 2001 – Evig Ung. Gamlegutta i ZOO aktive igjen med samle-CD

| Preceded by Britt Synnøve Johansen | Norway in the Eurovision Song Contest; 1990 | Succeeded by Just 4 Fun |
| Preceded by Bobbysocks | Norway in the Eurovision Song Contest; 1986 | Succeeded by Kate Gulbrandsen |
