= Hanne Krogh =

- Born: Hanne Krogh; 24 January 1956 (age 70); Oslo, Norway
- Origin: Haugesund and Oslo, Norway
- Occupations: Producer; Singer; Actress; Storyteller; Songwriter
- Years active: 1970–present
- Website: hannekrogh.com

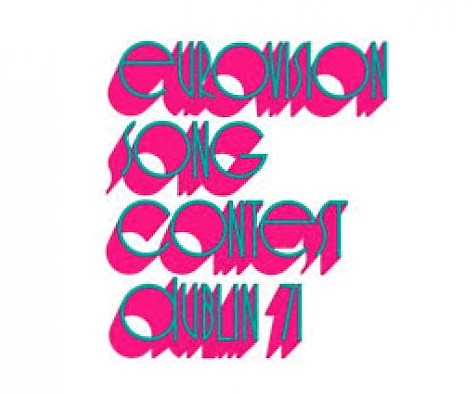
Logo (cover page) from "Eurovision Song Contest 1971"

Logo (cover page) from "Eurovision Song Contest 1985"

Hanne Krogh (born 24 January 1956) is a Norwegian singer and actress from Haugesund and Oslo. Krogh is among the most selling record artists in Norway ever. She represented Norway alone at the age of fifteen at the Eurovision Song Contest 1971 with the song "Lykken er..." and is internationally well known for winning the Eurovision Song Contest 1985 with Elisabeth Andreassen in the group Bobbysocks!.

== Personal life ==
She is the mother of television presenter Sverre Krogh Sundbø and actress Amalie Krogh.

== Career ==
She officially started singing when she was 9 years old, and released her first album when she was 14. She represented Norway with the song "Lykken er..." ("Happiness is...") in the 1971 Eurovision Song Contest. She has received major acclaim through Norwegian awards. Among them are numerous Spellemann (Norwegian Grammy) including the Honorary Award, and the Peer Gynt Prize, which is awarded by members of the Parliament to those Norwegians who have done the most to gain Norway's reputation abroad. In addition to her own projects, she is also frequently asked to act as MC at conventions, often in relation to female entrepreneurship.

In 2012, she toured Norway with two major sold-out shows that she had written and directed. She also made numerous television appearances. In 2013, Hanne decided to mark the 100-year anniversary of women's suffrage in Norway by focusing toward violence against women, and brought to light of unknown admirable women. This also included recording a new studio album Ikke gi deg, jente.

In 2015, her new-written show "World of Music" gained another standing ovation, both from the audience and from the critics.

Krogh has released 27 albums, including a compilation, Hanne Krogh: 40 beste in 1994, and many other singles.

== Discography ==
=== Solo albums ===
- Hanne Krogh (1978)
- Nærbilde (1980)
- Alene (1982)
- Nordens vakreste (1982)
- Under samme sol (1983)
- Julens vakreste (1983)
- Hanne (1989)
- Ta meg til havet (1992)
- 40 beste (1994)
- Prøysens barnesanger (1995)
- Julestjerner (1996)
- Reisen til den levende parken (1997)
- Vestavind (1998)
- Egners barnesanger (1999)
- God jul – Hannes beste julesanger (2000)
- Sanger fra barnas skattkammer (2002)
- Ved juletid (2002)
- God jul – Hannes beste julesanger (rerelease) (2006)
- Barnas nasjonalskatt (2012)
- Ikke gi deg, jente (2013)

=== Bobbysocks! albums ===
- Bobbysocks (1984/85)
- Waiting for the Morning (1986)
- Walkin' on Air (1987)
- Let It Swing – The Best of Bobbysocks (2010)

=== Just4Fun albums ===
- Ren 60 (1990/91)
- Those Were the Days (1991)

=== Hanne & Tre Tenorer albums ===
- Vår julekonsert (2011)

== Filmography ==
Krogh participated as an actress in these movies:

- 1974: Crash as Marianne
- 1976: Reisen til julestjernen as Sonja

== See also ==
- Eurovision Song Contest 1971
- Eurovision Song Contest 1985
- Eurovision Song Contest 1991
- Melodi Grand Prix
- Bobbysocks!
- Congratulations (Eurovision)
- Europride
- Elisabeth Andreassen

Awards and achievements
| Preceded by Herreys with "Diggi-Loo Diggi-Ley" | Winner of the Eurovision Song Contest (with Bobbysocks!); 1985 | Succeeded by Sandra Kim with "J'aime la vie" |
| Preceded by Kirsti Sparboe with "Oj, oj, oj, så glad jeg skal bli" | Norway in the Eurovision Song Contest; 1971 | Succeeded by Grethe Kausland & Benny Borg with "Småting" |
| Preceded by Dollie de Luxe with "Lenge leve livet" | Norway in the Eurovision Song Contest; 1985 (as a member of Bobbysocks) | Succeeded by Ketil Stokkan with "Romeo" |
| Preceded by Ketil Stokkan with "Brandenburger Tor" | Norway in the Eurovision Song Contest; 1991 (as a member of Just 4 Fun) | Succeeded by Merethe Trøan with "Visjoner" |
