= Elisabeth Andreassen =

Norwegian-Swedish singer (born 1958)

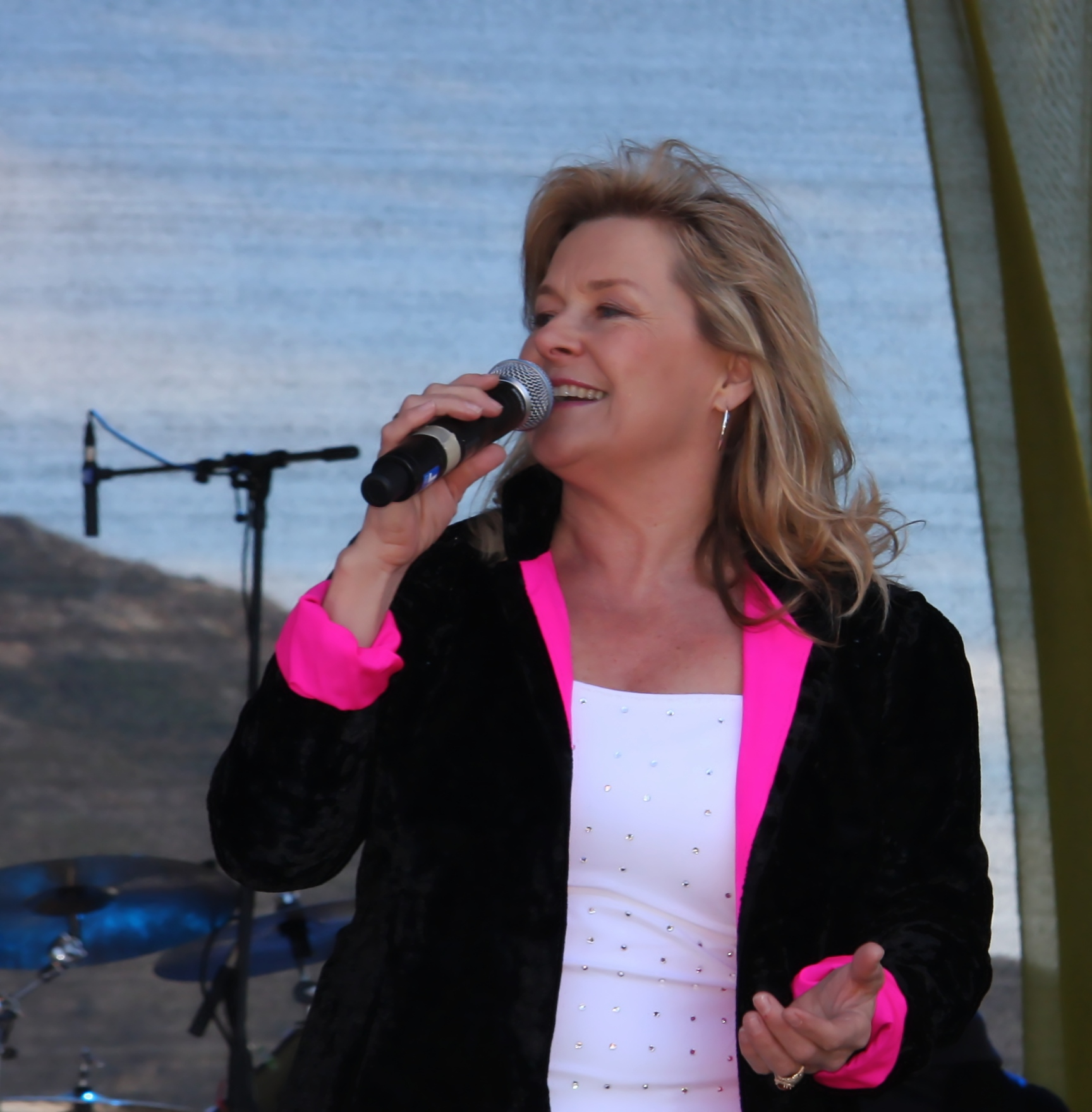

Background information
- Born: Elisabeth Gunilla Andreasson; 28 March 1958 (age 68); Gothenburg, Sweden
- Origin: Ullern, Norway
- Genres: Country; musical; pop; rock; schlager
- Years active: 1979–present

Elisabeth Gunilla Andreassen (née Andreasson; born 28 March 1958), also known simply as Bettan, is a Norwegian-Swedish singer who has finished both first and second in the Eurovision Song Contest.

== Career ==
Her talent was discovered in 1979 by Swedish musician and TV host Lasse Holm. She was produced by Bert Karlsson's label Mariann Grammofon AB. In 1980, she joined Lasse's group Chips. Chips participated in the Eurovision Song Contest 1982 with the song "Dag efter dag" ("Day After Day"), and reached 8th place.

Andreassen is active in many musical genres such as country, schlager, and musicals. She is mostly famous from Eurovision Song Contest 1985 when she and Hanne Krogh participated as Bobbysocks with the song "La det swinge", and won.

Andreassen has sung in various genres such as country, pop, rock and in musicals. She plays three instruments; guitar, piano and contrabass. She has also been a revue and musical artist.

"Bettan" has a record as the woman with the most participations in the Eurovision Song Contest, tied with Sue of Peter, Sue & Marc, and Valentina Monetta. She has participated four times, three times in duets (with Kikki Danielsson in 1982, Hanne Krogh in 1985, and Jan Werner Danielsen in 1994) and once on her own (in 1996).

== Personal life ==
Born on 28 March 1958 in Gothenburg, Sweden, to Norwegian parents. She lives in Ullern, Oslo, in Norway with her two daughters, born in 1995 and 1997. Elisabeth married Tor Andreassen on 2 July 1994 and after that she took his last name. On 13 June 2016 her husband died of a heart attack.

== Hits ==
- Då lyser en sol (1981)
- Killen ner' på Konsum svär att han är Elvis (There's a Guy Works down the Chipchop Swears he's Elvis) (1981)
- Together Again (1981)
- God morgon (Good Morning) (1981) (as Chips)
- Dag efter dag (Day after Day) (1982) (as Chips)
- La det swinge (Let it swing) (1985) (as Bobbysocks)
- Ängel i natt (1985)
- Tissel Tassel (1985)
- Waiting for the Morning (1986) (as Bobbysocks)
- Danse mot vår (Serenade to Spring) (1992)
- I evighet (Eternity) (1996) (Wir sind dabei) (1998)
- Pepita dansar (1997)
- Lys og varme (2001)
- Vem é dé du vill ha (2002) (as Kikki, Bettan & Lotta)

== Eurovision Song Contest ==
Altogether, Elisabeth has participated in the Swedish Melodifestivalen, Norwegian Melodi Grand Prix and the Eurovision Song Contest 14 times, plus four times (once in Sweden and three times in Norway) as presenter.

=== Melodifestivalen ===
1981. Chips - "God morgon" (Good morning), 2nd place
1982. Chips - "Dag efter dag" (Day after day), 1st place
1984. Elisabeth Andreasson - "Kärleksmagi", 6th place (last)
1990. Elisabeth Andreasson - "Jag ser en stjärna falla", 7th place
2000. TV-host, with nine other artists.
2002. Kikki, Bettan & Lotta - "Vem é dé du vill ha", 3rd place
2011. Elisabeth Andreassen - "Vaken i en dröm", 8th place in semi

=== Melodi Grand Prix ===
1985. Bobbysocks - "La det swinge" (Let it swing), 1st place
1992. TV-host, with Jahn Teigen
1994. Elisabeth Andreasson and Jan Werner Danielsen - "Duett" (Duet), 1st place
1996. Elisabeth Andreassen - "I evighet" (Eternity), 1st place
1998. Elisabeth Andreassen - "Winds of the Northern Sea", 2nd place
2003. Kikki, Bettan & Lotta - "Din hånd i min hånd", 4th place
2015. Elisabeth Andreassen & Tor Endresen - "All over the world", 4th place
2025. Bobbysocks - “Joyful”, 3rd place

=== Eurovision Song Contest ===
1982. Chips - "Dag efter dag", 8th place, Sweden
1985. Bobbysocks - "La det swinge", 1st place, Norway
1994. Elisabeth Andreasson & Jan Werner Danielsen - "Duett", 6th place, Norway
1996. Elisabeth Andreassen - "I evighet", 2nd place, Norway

== Discography ==
=== Chips ===
- God morgon/It Takes More than a Minute (1981) - Single
- Having a Party (1982)
- Dag efter dag/Här kommer solen (1982) - Single
- 20 bästa låtar (1997) - Compilation album

=== Kikki, Bettan & Lotta ===
- 20 år med oss - Vem é dé du vill ha (2002)
- Vem é dé du vill ha (2002) - Single
- Live från Rondo (2003)

=== Solo ===
- Angel of the Morning (1981)
- I'm a Woman (1983)
- Elisabeth Andreasson (1985)
- Greatest Hits Vol. 2 (1985)
- Greatest Hits (1986)
- Älskar, älskar ej (1988)
- Elisabeth (1990)
- Stemninger (1992 to 1994)
- Julestemninger (1993)
- Elisabeth Andreassens bästa 1981-1995 (1995)
- Eternity (1996)
- Bettans jul (1996)
- Så skimrande var aldrig havet (1997)
- 20 bästa (1998)
- Kjærlighetsviser (2001)
- A Couple of Days in Larsville (2004)
- Short Stories (2005)
- Bettan Country (2007)
- Spellemann (2009)
- Julenatt (2009)
- Kärleken & livet (2012)
- De fineste (2014)

== See also ==
- Bobbysocks
- Eurovision Song Contest
- Eurovision Song Contest 1985
- Eurovision Song Contest 1996
- Melodi Grand Prix
- Melodifestivalen
- Hanne Krogh

Preceded by Herreys with "Diggi-loo Diggi-ley"	Winner of the Eurovision Song Contest; 1985 (as Bobbysocks!)	Succeeded by Sandra Kim with "J'aime la vie"
Preceded by Secret Garden with "Nocturne"	Norway in the Eurovision Song Contest; 1996	Succeeded by Tor Endresen with "San Francisco"
Preceded by Silje Vige with "Alle mine tankar"	Norway in the Eurovision Song Contest; 1994 (with Jan Werner Danielsen)	Succeeded by Secret Garden with "Nocturne"
Preceded by Dollie de Luxe with "Lenge leve livet"	Norway in the Eurovision Song Contest; 1985 (as Bobbysocks!)	Succeeded by Ketil Stokkan with "Romeo"
Preceded by Björn Skifs with "Fångad i en dröm"	Sweden in the Eurovision Song Contest; 1982 (as Chips)	Succeeded by Carola Häggkvist with "Främling"
