= List of Melodi Grand Prix winners =

This article lists the songs and artists that have won Melodi Grand Prix, the Norwegian national selection for the Eurovision Song Contest. The competition was not held in 1970 (non-participation), 1991 (NRK’s cancellation), and 2002 (relegation).

== List of winners ==
Table key
| # | Winner |
| † | Second place |
| ‡ | Third place |
| ◁ | Last place |
| X | Entry selected but did not compete |
| † | Upcoming event |

| Year | Song | Artist | Songwriter(s) | At Eurovision | | | |
| Year | Song | Artist | Songwriter(s) | Final | Points | Semi | Points |
|---|---|---|---|---|---|---|---|
| 1960 | "Voi Voi" | Nora Brockstedt | Georg Elgaaen | 4th | 11 | No semi-finals | |
| 1961 | "Sommer i Palma" | Nora Brockstedt | Egil Hansen, Jan Wølner | 7th | 10 | No semi-finals | |
| 1962 | "Kom sol, kom regn" | Inger Jacobsen | Ivar Jacobsen, Kjell Karlsen | 10th | 2 | No semi-finals | |
| 1963 | "Solhverv" | Anita Thallaug | Dag Kristoffersen | 13th ◁ | 0 | No semi-finals | |
| 1964 | "Spiral" | Arne Bendiksen | Egil Hansen, Sigurd Jansen | 8th | 6 | No semi-finals | |
| 1965 | "Karusell" | Kirsti Sparboe | Jolly Kramer-Johansen | 13th | 1 | No semi-finals | |
| 1966 | "Intet er nytt under solen" | Åse Kleveland | Arne Bendiksen | 3rd | 15 | No semi-finals | |
| 1967 | "Dukkemann" | Kirsti Sparboe | Ola B. Johannessen, Tor Hultin | 14th | 2 | No semi-finals | |
| 1968 | "Jeg har aldri vært så glad i noen som deg" | Odd Børre | Kari Nergaard | Withdrawn (Note: Nergaard withdrew the song after the Norwegian final, due to allegations of plagiarism. Instead, NRK picked the runner-up, "Stress" to compete in the Eurovision Song Contest 1968. "Stress" ended up as 13th with 2 points.) X | | No semi-finals | |
| 1969 | "Oj, oj, oj, så glad jeg skal bli" | Kirsti Sparboe | Arne Bendiksen | 16th ◁ | 1 | No semi-finals | |
| 1971 | "Lykken er..." | Hanne Krogh | Arne Bendiksen | 17th | 65 | No semi-finals | |
| 1972 | "Småting" | Grethe Kausland and Benny Borg | Ivar Børsum, Kåre Grøttum | 14th | 73 | No semi-finals | |
| 1973 | "Å, for et spill" | Bendik Singers | Arne Bendiksen | 7th (Note: As "It's Just A Game".) | 89 | No semi-finals | |
| 1974 | "Hvor er du?" | Anne-Karine Strøm | Frode Thingnæs, Philip Kruse | 14th ◁ (Note: As "The First Day of Love".) | 3 | No semi-finals | |
| 1975 | "Det skulle ha vært sommer nå" | Ellen Nikolaysen | Svein Hundsnes | 18th (Note: As "Touch My Life (With Summer)".) | 11 | No semi-finals | |
| 1976 | "Mata Hari" | Anne-Karine Strøm | Frode Thingnæs, Philip Kruse | 18th ◁ | 7 | No semi-finals | |
| 1977 | "Casanova" | Anita Skorgan | Dag Nordtømme, Svein Strugstad | 14th | 18 | No semi-finals | |
| 1978 | "Mil etter mil" | Jahn Teigen | Kai Eide | 20th ◁ | 0 | No semi-finals | |
| 1979 | "Oliver" | Anita Skorgan | Anita Skorgan, Philip Kruse | 11th | 57 | No semi-finals | |
| 1980 | "Sámiid ædnan" | Sverre Kjelsberg and Mattis Hætta | Ragnar Sør Olsen, Sverre Kjelsberg | 16th | 15 | No semi-finals | |
| 1981 | "Aldri i livet" | Finn Kalvik | Finn Kalvik | 20th ◁ | 0 | No semi-finals | |
| 1982 | "Adieu" | Jahn Teigen and Anita Skorgan | Herodes Falsk, Jahn Teigen | 12th | 44 | No semi-finals | |
| 1983 | "Do Re Mi" | Jahn Teigen | Anita Skorgan, Herodes Falsk, Jahn Teigen | 9th | 53 | No semi-finals | |
| 1984 | "Lenge leve livet" | Dollie de Luxe | Benedicte Adrian, Ingrid Bjørnov | 17th | 29 | No semi-finals | |
| 1985 | "La det swinge" | Bobbysocks | Rolf Løvland | 1st | 123 | No semi-finals | |
| 1986 | "Romeo" | Ketil Stokkan | Ketil Stokkan | 12th | 44 | No semi-finals | |
| 1987 | "Mitt liv" | Kate Guldbrandsen | Hanne Krogh, Rolf Løvland | 9th | 65 | No semi-finals | |
| 1988 | "For vår jord" | Karoline Krüger | Anita Skorgan, Erik Hillestad | 5th | 88 | No semi-finals | |
| 1989 | "Venners nærhet" | Britt Synnøve Johansen | Leiv Grøtte, Inge Enoksen | 17th | 30 | No semi-finals | |
| 1990 | "Brandenburger Tor" | Ketil Stokkan | Ketil Stokkan | 21st ◁ | 8 | No semi-finals | |
| 1991 | "Mrs. Thompson" | Just 4 Fun | Dag Kolsrud, Kaare Skevik Jr., Per Gerhard Roness | 17th | 14 | No semi-finals | |
| 1992 | "Visjoner" | Merethe Trøan | Eva Jansen, Robert Morley | 18th | 23 | No semi-finals | |
| 1993 | "Alle mine tankar" | Silje Vige | Bjørn Erik Vige | 5th | 120 | No semi-finals | |
| 1994 | "Duett" | Elisabeth Andreassen and Jan Werner Danielsen | Hans Olav Mørk, Rolf Løvland | 6th | 76 | No semi-finals | |
| 1995 | "Nocturne" | Secret Garden | Petter Skavlan, Rolf Løvland | 1st | 148 | No semi-finals | |
| 1996 | "I evighet" | Elisabeth Andreassen | Torhild Nigar | 2nd | 114 | No semi-finals | |
| 1997 | "San Francisco" | Tor Endresen | Arne Myksvol, Tor Endresen | 24th ◁ | 0 | No semi-finals | |
| 1998 | "All I Ever Wanted Was You" | Lars A. Fredriksen | David Eriksen, Linda Andernach Johannesen | 8th (Note: As "Alltid sommer".) | 79 | No semi-finals | |
| 1999 | "Living My Life Without You" | Stig van Eijk | Stig van Eijk | 14th | 35 | No semi-finals | |
| 2000 | "My Heart Goes Boom" | Charmed | Morten Henriksen, Tore Madsen | 11th | 57 | No semi-finals | |
| 2001 | "On My Own" | Haldor Lægreid | Ole Henrik Antonsen, Ole Jørgen Olsen, Tom-Steinar Hanssen | 22nd ◁ | 3 | No semi-finals | |
| 2003 | "I'm Not Afraid to Move On" | Jostein Hasselgård | Arve Furset, VJ Strøm | 4th | 123 | No semi-finals | |
| 2004 | "High" | Knut Anders Sørum | Dan Attlerud, Lars Andersson, Thomas Thörnholm | 24th ◁ | 3 | Top 11 Previous Year | |
| 2005 | "In My Dreams" | Wig Wam | Trond Holter | 9th | 125 | 6th | 164 |
| 2006 | "Alvedansen" | Christine Guldbrandsen | Atle Halstensen, Christine Guldbrandsen, Kjetil Fluge | 14th | 36 | Top 11 Previous Year | |
| 2007 | "Ven a bailar conmigo" | Guri Schanke | Thomas G:son | Failed to qualify | | 18th | 48 |
| 2008 | "Hold On Be Strong" | Maria Haukaas Storeng | Mira Craig | 5th | 182 | 4th | 106 |
| 2009 | "Fairytale" | Alexander Rybak | Alexander Rybak | 1st | 387 | 1st | 201 |
| 2010 | "My Heart Is Yours" | Didrik Solli-Tangen | Fredrik Kempe, Hanne Sørvaag | 20th | 35 | Host country | |
| 2011 | "Haba Haba" | Stella Mwangi | Andreas Sjo Engen, Joachim Alte, Kjetil Granum Helgesen, Marcus Ulstad Nilsen, Stella Mwangi, Tom Roger Rogstad | Failed to qualify | | 17th | 30 |
| 2012 | "Stay" | Tooji | Figge Boström, Peter Boström, Tooji Keshtkar | 26th ◁ | 7 | 10th | 45 |
| 2013 | "I Feed You My Love" | Margaret Berger | Karin Park, Niklas Jan Olovson, Robin Mortensen Lynch | 4th | 191 | 3rd | 120 |
| 2014 | "Silent Storm" | Carl Espen | Josefin Winther | 8th | 88 | 6th | 77 |
| 2015 | "A Monster Like Me" | Mørland and Debrah Scarlett | Kjetil Mørland | 8th | 102 | 4th | 123 |
| 2016 | "Icebreaker" | Agnete | Agnete Johnsen, Gabriel Alares, Ian Curnow | Failed to qualify | | 13th | 63 |
| 2017 | "Grab the Moment" | Jowst feat. Aleksander Walmann | Joakim With Steen, Jonas McDonnell | 10th | 158 | 5th | 189 |
| 2018 | "That's How You Write a Song" | Alexander Rybak | Alexander Rybak | 15th | 144 | 1st | 266 |
| 2019 | "Spirit in the Sky" | Keiino | Alexander Nyborg Olsson, Alexandra Rotan, Fred-René Buljo, Henrik Tala, Rüdiger Schramm, Tom Hugo Hermansen | 6th | 331 | 7th | 210 |
| 2020 | "Attention" | Ulrikke Brandstorp | Christian Ingebrigtsen, Kjetil Mørland, Ulrikke Brandstorp | Contest cancelled (Note: The 2020 contest was cancelled due to the COVID-19 pandemic.) X | | | |
| 2021 | "Fallen Angel" | Tix | Andreas Haukeland | 18th | 75 | 10th | 115 |
| 2022 | "Give That Wolf a Banana" | Subwoolfer | Ben Adams, Gaute Ormasen, Carl-Henrik Wahl (as Keith, Jim, and DJ Astronaut) | 10th | 182 | 6th | 177 |
| 2023 | "Queen of Kings" | Alessandra | Alessandra Mele, Henning Olerud, Linda Dale, Stanley Ferdinandez | 5th | 268 | 6th | 102 |
| 2024 | "Ulveham" | Gåte | Gunnhild Sundli, Jon Even Schärer, Magnus Børmark, Marit Jensen Lillebuen, Ronny Graff Janssen, Sveinung Ekloo Sundli | 25th ◁ | 16 | 10th | 43 |
| 2025 | "Lighter" | Kyle Alessandro | Kyle Alessandro, Adam Woods | 18th | 89 | 8th | 82 |
| 2026 | "Ya Ya Ya" | Jonas Lovv | Jonas Lovv Hellesøy, Sondre Skaftum | Upcoming † | | | |

== Performers and songwriters with multiple wins ==
The following individuals have won the Melodi Grand Prix as a performer or songwriter more than once.

Individuals with multiple Melodi Grand Prix wins
| Wins | Name | Wins as performer | Wins as songwriter |
|---|---|---|---|
| 5 | Arne Bendiksen | 1964 | 1966, 1969, 1971, 1973 |
| 5 | Anita Skorgan | 1977, 1979, 1982 (with Jahn Teigen) | 1979, 1983, 1988 |
| 4 | Rolf Løvland | 1995 (as part of Secret Garden) | 1985, 1987, 1994, 1995 |
| 3 | Anne-Karine Strøm | 1973 (as part of Bendik Singers), 1974, 1976 | —N/a |
| 3 | Elisabeth Andreassen | 1985 (as part of Bobbysocks!), 1994 (with Jan Werner Danielsen), 1996 | —N/a |
| 3 | Kirsti Sparboe | 1965, 1967, 1969 | —N/a |
| 3 | Hanne Krogh | 1971, 1985 (as part of Bobbysocks!) | 1987 |
| 3 | Jahn Teigen | 1978, 1982 (with Anita Skorgan), 1983 | 1982, 1983 |
| 3 | Philip Kruse | —N/a | 1974, 1976, 1979 |
| 2 | Egil Hansen | —N/a | 1961, 1964 |
| 2 | Frode Thingnæs | —N/a | 1974, 1976 |
| 2 | Herodes Falsk | —N/a | 1982, 1983 |
| 2 | Kjetil Mørland | 2015 | 2015, 2020 |
| 2 | Ellen Nikolaysen | 1973 (as part of Bendik Singers), 1975 | —N/a |
| 2 | Nora Brockstedt | 1960, 1961 | —N/a |
| 2 | Alexander Rybak | 2009, 2018 | |
| 2 | Ketil Stokkan | 1986, 1990 | |

== See also ==
- Melodi Grand Prix
- Norway in the Eurovision Song Contest
