= Philip Kruse =

Norwegian orchestra leader, composer, writer, and musician

- Born: Philip Antony Kruse; 13 May 1949 (age 76); Oslo, Norway
- Genres: Jazz, pop
- Occupation: Musician
- Instrument: Trumpet

Philip Antony Kruse (born 13 May 1949) is a Norwegian orchestra leader, composer, arranger, producer, text writer, and musician (trumpet and vocals). He is the second son of Colonel Erling O. Kruse (born 1922) and Eunice Cooklin (born 1925).

== Career ==
In his early career he joined the group Bendik Singers with his brother Bjørn Kruse. Bendik Singers was a vocal quartet founded by Arne Bendiksen, where the two brothers sang with Anne-Karine Strøm and Ellen Nikolaysen. They won the Norwegian Melodi Grand Prix twice. In addition, Kruse won the Norwegian Melodi Grand Prix three times as a text writer. As producer of the album Match with Wenche Hallan and Jan Høiland, he won the Spellemannprisen in 1976.

He has written about 2,000 melodies and texts for artists like Tommy Körberg, Anita Hegerland, Inger Lise Rypdal, Anne-Karine Strøm and George Keller, and has written the music to TV serials like Amalies jul, Huset med det rare i and Puslespill for NRK. He has produced about 300 music records, including Øivind Blunck's Reidar, Viggo Sandvik's Fisking i Valdres, Trond-Viggo Torgersen's Tramp på en smurf and Vidar Sandbeck's Ballade. As orchestral leader he has contributed to many NRK radio and television productions. He has been on tour with Bjørn Eidsvåg, Sigmund Groven, Ellen Nikolaysen, Kari-Ann Grønnsund, Frode Thingnæs and Vidar Lønn-Arnesen. Lately he has led his own bigband, Philip Kruse BigBand.

Kruse worked with Arne Bendiksen's record company in 1971 to 1979 before he got together with Frode Thingnæs and started Frost Music A/S in 1979. He led this music publishing company until it was sold to EMI in 1999. He was chairman of GramArt and is the chairman of the main jury of the Edvard price given by TONO and director of the Norsk Musikkfond. In 1997 he received the Oslo City Culture Grant. In 2011, he became chairman of the board of NMFF (Norwegian Music Publisher Association) and board member of TONO.

== Bibliography ==
- Philip A. Kruse (2011): Musikkforlaget : fra copyright til cash (in Norwegian) ISBN 9788299856508

== Discography ==
- 1974: Bendik Singers (Triola), with Bendik Singers
- 1978: Norges Største Sjokk Å Lade Plate (Flower), with Einar Hagerup
