= Frid Ingulstad =

Norwegian novelist (1935–2026)

- Ingulstad in 2015
- Born: 4 September 1935; Oslo, Norway
- Died: 9 May 2026 (aged 90); Oslo, Norway
- Occupations: Novelist, stenographer
- Years active: 1990–2024
- Spouse: Arnulf Ingulstad (m. 1975)
- Children: 3
- Awards: Oslo City art award (2010); King's Medal of Merit (2018)

Frid Ingulstad (4 September 1935 – 9 May 2026) was a Norwegian novelist and stenographer. She primarily wrote historical novels and book series. Ingulstad was one of the best-selling authors in Norway, and published more than 200 books. Ingulstad was best known for her novel series Sønnavind, which was a series of historical novels set among factory workers along the Akerselva. Other series by her are Kongsdøtrene, Ildkorset, and Ingebjørg Olavsdatter. She also wrote children's books, both fiction and non-fiction.

== Career ==
Ingulstad worked for Fred. Olsen Airtransport as a stenographer and then as a flight attendant, then on the Norwegian America Line ship Idefjord as a radio telegrapher, before becoming a full-time writer in 1990. Her first book, Hva livet gir deg, Camilla, was published in 1965; a travel book had been previously rejected. In 1998, Ingulstad began writing the Kongsdøtrene series, which would span 15 books and conclude in 2007. That same year, she also began writing the Królowe Wikingów series, which contained six novels. In 2003, she began writing the Ingebjørg Olavsdatter series, which concluded in 2018 and contained 14 novels. She was perhaps best known for her novel series, Sønnavind, a series of historical novels set among factory workers along the Akerselva. It was released in 2005. In 2020, she wrote the 100th book of the series with Velkommen hjem, set in 1959. The series would conclude in 2024 with 124 novels total.

Ingulstad was one of the best-selling authors in Norway. In 2006, 420,000 of her books were sold. She had total sales of approximately 4 million books at the time of her death. She published her 200th book (in the Sønnavind series) in 2013. In 2020, she had published a total of 243 books. She published an autobiography, Min historie, in 2007. In 2015, she published a biography of Betzy Kjelsberg titled Betzy. That same year, she started writing the Ildkorset series. From 2022 to 2023, she wrote the Frids historiske series.

Ingulstad was repeatedly rejected for membership in the Norwegian Authors' Union, occasioning discussion about the organisation's definition of "literary worth". At its foundation in 2018, she became a member of the initial board of directors of the rival organisation Forfatterforbundet.

In her later years, her writing career slowed down due to a diagnosis of Parkinson's disease; however, Ingulstad credited her writing as a way to deal with the illness.

== Personal life and death ==
Ingulstad was born in Oslo, Norway, on 4 September 1935. She married Arnulf Ingulstad, an engineer, in 1975. They have a son together, and two daughters from her first marriage. They lived in the house where she was born and raised, in the Kastellet section of Nordstrand, in Oslo.

Ingulstad died from complications of Parkinson's disease in Oslo on 9 May 2026, at the age of 90.

== Awards and honours ==
Ingulstad's novel, Mannemakt og mørkemakter, won the first prize in a contest by the publisher Dreijer. Her other novel, Munken (1991), won a prize from Gyldendal.

She received the Oslo City art award in 2010 and the King's Medal of Merit in 2018. In 2017, the Riksmål Society awarded her its first personal prize.

== Selected bibliography ==
- Munken (1991)
- Kongsdøtrene series (1998–2007)
- Królowe Wikingów series (1998)
- Ingebjørg Olavsdatter series (2003–2018)
- Sønnavind series (2005–2024)
- Ildkorset series (2015)
- Betzy (2015)
- Frids historiske series (2022–2023)
