= Oslo City Culture Award =

The Oslo City Culture Award is a Norwegian award given to a person, group or cultural activity of outstanding achievement in or long-time contribution to arts, science or other cultural work in the city of Oslo's or the country's cultural life. A bronze medal and monetary reward are included with the prize. The award is distributed alongside the Oslo City Artist Award by the city's mayor in April and May every year, at the City Hall. The Oslo City Culture Award has been distributed annually since 1966, with the exception of 1991 for lack of funding.
