= Ellen Nikolaysen =

Norwegian singer/actress (born 1951)

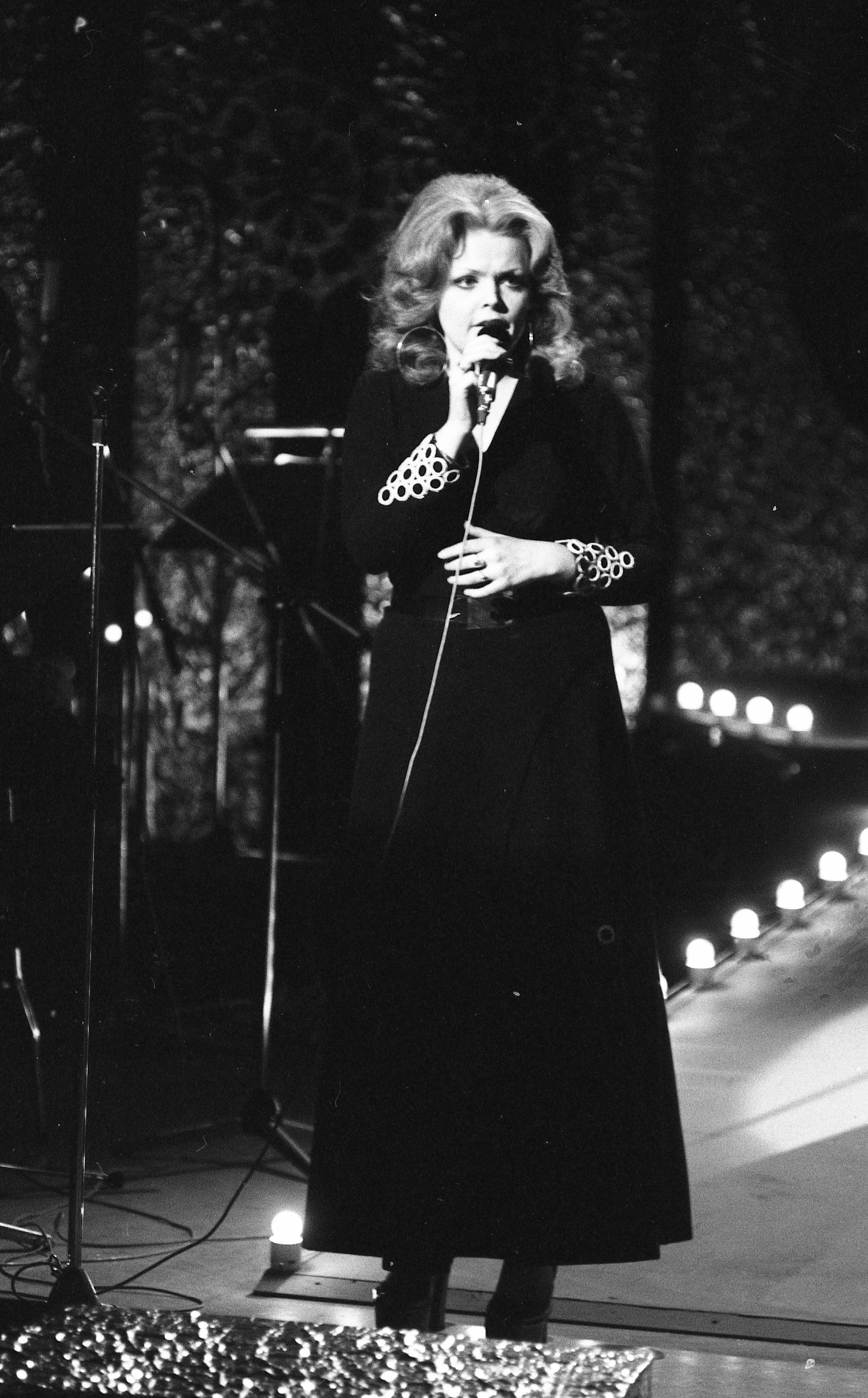
Ellen Nikolaysen at the Norwegian Melodi Grand Prix, 1974.

Ellen Helen Nikolaysen (born 10 December 1951) is a Norwegian singer/actress. She participated in the Eurovision Song Contest in 1973 as part of the Bendik Singers group with the song It's Just A Game and Eurovision this time as a solo artist in 1975 with Touch My Life With Summer. She won the Best Performance Award at the World Popular Song Festival in Tokyo in 1974 with the entry "You Made Me Feel I Could Fly". In the early 1990s she began a new career as actor in musicals on Norwegian theatre stages.

== Discography ==
=== Albums ===
- 1972; Stans! Jeg vil gi deg en sang
- 1973: Freckles
- 1976: Kom
- 1978: Jul med Hans Petter og Ellen with Hans Petter Hansen
- 1983: Songar utan ord with Sigmund Groven
- 1987: Julekvad

=== Singles ===
- 1971 "Livet er som et orkester" ("We're All Playing in the Same Band") / Kom, kom, kom (Pomme, pomme, pomme) (Philips 6084 008)
- 1973 "Sangen han sang var min egen" ("Killing Me Softly With His Song") / Når du ler
- 1974 "Kunne du lese tanker"
- 1974 "You Made Me Feel I Could Fly" / "Who Put the Lights Out" (Philips 6084 043)
- 1975 "Du gjorde verden så lys" / "Hvis du tror meg (si det nå)" (Philips 6084 045)
- 1975 "Touch My Life With Summer" / "You Made Me Feel I Could Fly" (Philips 6084 046)
- 1975 "Wer liebt kommt wieder" / "Aber du" (Philips 6003 419)
- 1977 "Sommerzeit" / "Du bist nicht mehr, was du mal warst" Boy (CBS 5262)

Preceded by Grethe Kausland & Benny Borg with "Småting"	Norway in the Eurovision Song Contest; 1973 (as a member of Bendik Singers)	Succeeded by Anne-Karine Strøm with "The First Day of Love"
Preceded by Anne-Karine Strøm with "The First Day of Love"	Norway in the Eurovision Song Contest; 1975	Succeeded by Anne-Karine Strøm with "Mata Hari"
