= Frode Thingnæs =

- Born: 20 March 1940; Nore og Uvdal, Buskerud, Norway
- Died: 15 November 2012 (aged 72) Oslo, Norway
- Genre: Jazz
- Occupations: Musician, composer, conductor
- Instruments: Trombone, trumpet
- Formerly of: Frode Thingnæs Quintet
- Website: www.musikkorps.no/Frode+Thingn%C3%A6s+er+d%C3%B8d.b7C_wZLM4_.ips

Frode Thingnæs (20 March 1940 – 15 November 2012) was a Norwegian jazz composer, arranger, conductor and trombone player who formed the Frode Thingnæs Quintet in 1960.

== Career ==
Thingnæs was introduced to music at eight years old, when he started to play in a Sinsen school band. His first instrument was the trumpet, but in 1953 he took up the instrument he would come to be known for: the trombone. Due to his success at a young age, he was able to continue his musical education at the Royal Danish Academy of Music in Copenhagen, where he met other rising musicians. From 1959 onward, Thingnæs met and performed with the bands of Bjørn Jacobsen, Gunnar Brostigen, Mikkel Flagstad and Kjell Karlsen. Starting in 1961, he led his own quartet, which over time included Egil Kapstad, Terje Rypdal, Laila Dalseth, Espen Rud, Bjørn Alterhaug and Per Husby. However, it was the Frode Thingnæs Quintet (including Henryk Lysiak, Jan Erik Kongshaug, Pete Knutsen, and Thor Andreassen) that was included on Norway's first jazz album, released in 1963. In 1967 Thingnæs was named best trombonist in the magazine 'Jazznytt musician vote' and in 1969 he led a Norwegian sextet at the prestigious Montreux Jazz Festival.

Although Thingnæs is best known for his role in the jazz community, he also made major contributions to many areas in Norwegian music. In 1960, he took the prestigious role of kapellmeister at Norway's most famous revue theater, Chat Noir. While there, he collaborated with entertainers including Einar Schanke, Alfred Næss and actor Yngvar Numme. He also worked with the rock band Popol Ace and conducted the Norwegian Radio Orchestra. Together with Philip Kruse, Thingnæs wrote the music for the Norwegian Eurovision Song Contest entries "Hvor er du?" (1974, English title "The First Day of Love") and "Mata Hari" (1976), both performed by his former wife, Anne-Karine Strøm. Both Thingnæs and Strøm were members of the jury-member "Finn Eriksen's Orchestra" at the time. Other pop music collaborations include Wenche Myhre, Lill Lindfors and Svante Thuresson, as well as production credits for, among others, Bodega Band (1977).

In addition, Thingnæs worked as a conductor at two Oslo theaters, the Forsvarets staff music corps and, for over thirty years, the Kampen Janitsjarorkester. He composed for the Melodi Grand Prix in 1974 "Hvor er du?" and the 1976 "Mata Hari" (both times for Anne-Karine Strøm). His Flåklypaballetten for symphony orchestra was performed at the Norwegian Opera in 1985. In the same year, Thingnæs created his "Sonnets to Sundry Notes" of Music for symphony orchestra, big band and choir, based on texts by Shakespeare. His most renowned original works may be Wheels and the Flåklypa ballet (1985), performed at the Norwegian National Opera. In his latter years, he led a quintet together with Harald Gundhus.

== Death ==
Frode Thingnæs died in Oslo in November 2012, aged 72.

== Honors ==
- 1970: Buddy Prize awarded by the Norwegian Jazz Federation
- 1980: Spellemann Prize in the class Jazz for the album Direct to Dish
- 1983: Gammleng Award as a studio musician
- 1999: The Norwegian King's Medal of Merit in gold
- 1999: Honorary Citizen of New Orleans

== Personal life ==
Thingnæs was married to actress and drama teacher Marianne Mørk (b. 16 May 1953) on 2 June 1979. They had two children together: pianist Magnus Alexander Mørk Thingnæs (b. 1984), and filmmaker Maren Victoria Thingnæs (b. 1991).

== Selected discography ==
=== Solo albums ===
Big Band

- 1974: Feelin' All Right (Polydor Records)

Frode Thingnæs Quintet

- 1978: Nightsounds (Talent Records)
- 1980: Direct to Dish (Philips Records)
- 1981: Queen Python (Philips Records)
- 1994: Watch What Happens! (Gemini Records), including with Svein Christiansen & Terje Gewelt

=== Collaborations ===
Kampen Janitsjarorkester

- 1990: Sing as we Go (Kampen Janitsjar)
- 2002: From Kampen to New Orleans (Kampen Janitsjar)
- 2008: Samspill(Kampen Janitsjar)

With Bjørn Alterhaug, Bjørn Johansen, Egil Kapstad & Laila Dalseth

- 1991: Some Other Time (Gemini Records)

Antonsen Big Band

- 2007: Antonsen Big Band (Ponca Jazz)

Kjell Karlsen Big Band

- 2008: Edvard Grieg in Jazz Mood (Universal Music)

Preceded by (Republic of Ireland) Noel Kelehan	Eurovision Song Contest conductor 1996	Succeeded by (Republic of Ireland) Frank McNamara

Awards
Preceded by Frode Thingnæs	Recipient of the Buddyprisen; 1970	Succeeded by Carl Magnus Neumann
Preceded by Bjørn Alterhaug	Recipient of the Jazz Spellemannsprisen; 1980	Succeeded by Thorgeir Stubø
