= Kampen Janitsjarorkester =

The Kampen Janitsjarorkester is a Norwegian marching wind band from the neighbourhood of Kampen in Oslo. The wind orchestra was founded 10 September 1929 by a group of Friends.

Kampen Wind Orchestra consisted of only men. The orchestra plays most often locally in Oslo, but also in the rest of the country and occasionally abroad. They have played at military tattoo in Garmich Partenkirchen, during New York marathon and participated in Wenche Myhre show in Germany.

The orchestra has led to a number of fields for band. The orchestra has gone their separate ways when it comes to musical styles, content and execution has been at the center. It introduced swing music in the street in the 1950s, where 12th Street Rag was the first "song". After this, the orchestra has played nearly 100 "tracks" by among others Rolf Letting, Frode Thingnæs, Helge Førde, Lars Erik Gudim and Even Kruse Skatrud.

Kampegutta has also released several albums and CDs.

One of the signature songs of The Kampen Janitsjarorkester is "Sing As We Go", which the band both plays and sings while marching.

In 2018 they got their own stamp in connection with NMF 100 tears anniversary.

In 2019 they were guest at BigBang concert at Over Oslo. Later that year they filled Oslo konserthus for their jubileums concert. They ended the year as guestartist at DiDerre christmas show.

In the period 2016-2018 there was made a documentary about the orchestra that was shown on NRK in 2020.

In January 2021 they got Tarjei Grimsby as a New musical director.

== Awards ==
- Oslo City art award was divided between the Kampen Wind Orchestra and conductor Frode Thingnæs in 1995.
- Members of the Kampen Wind Orchestra are honorary residents of New Orleans.
