= Mata Hari (Anne-Karine Strøm song) =

1976 song by Anne Karine Strøm

Single by Anne-Karine Strøm
- B-side: "Noen År I Fred" (Norwegian release); "Please Don't Go Away" (English release)
- Released: 1976
- Length: 3:05
- Label: Triola
- Songwriters: Frode Thingnæs; Philip A. Kruse
- Producer: Philip A. Kruse

Anne-Karine Strøm singles chronology
"Saloniki" (1975)	"Mata Hari" (1976)	"Et Lite Smil" (1977)

(Norway) "Mata Hari"
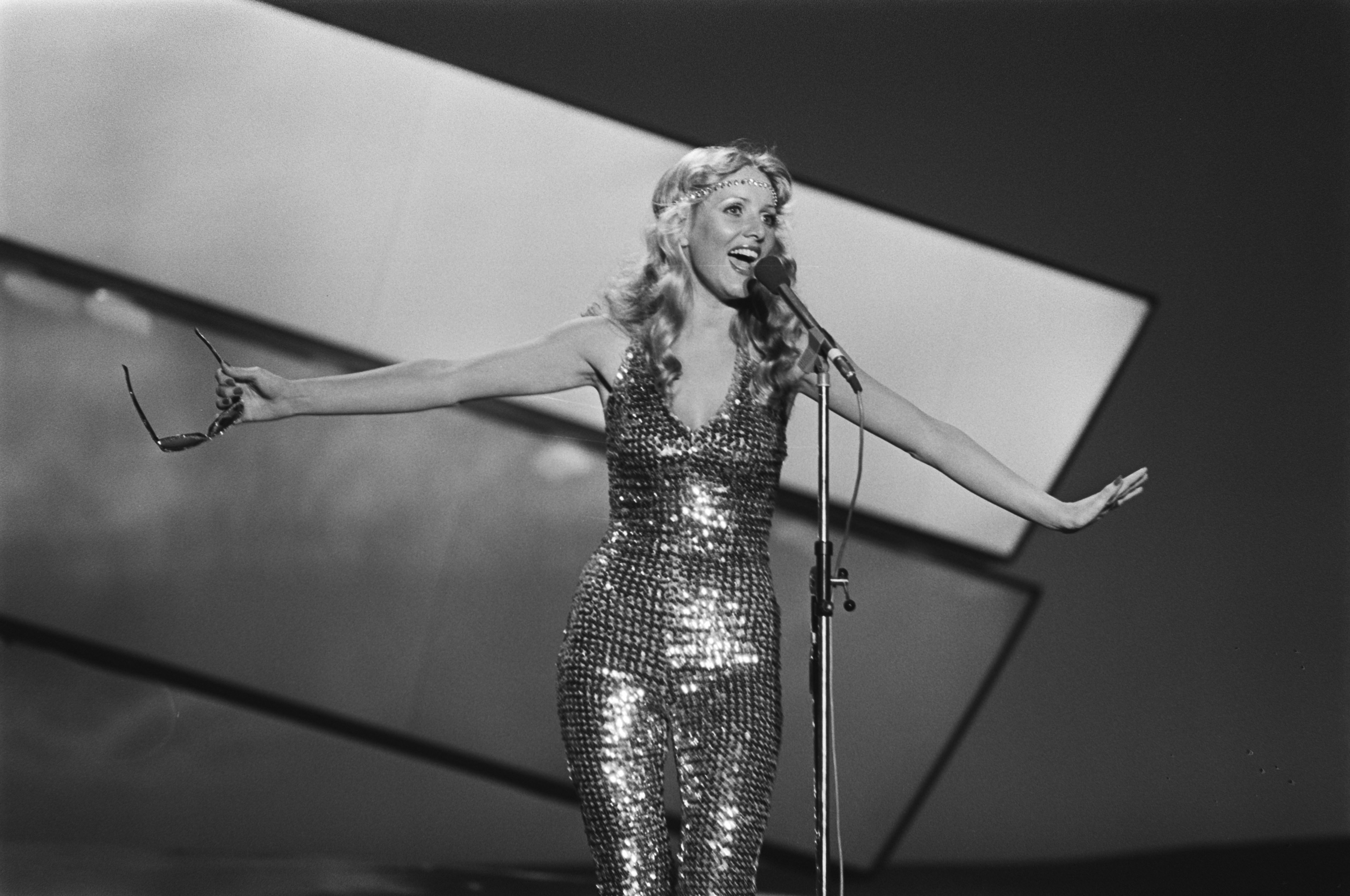

Eurovision Song Contest 1976 entry
- Country: Norway
- Artist: Anne-Karine Strøm
- Languages: Norwegian (original version); English (Eurovision version)
- Composer: Frode Thingnæs
- Lyricist: Philip A. Kruse
- Conductor: Frode Thingnæs

Finals performance
- Final result: 18th
- Final points: 7

Entry chronology
- ◄ "Touch My Life (With Summer)" (1975)
- "Casanova" (1977) ►

"Mata Hari" was the Norwegian entry in the Eurovision Song Contest 1976, performed in English by Anne-Karine Strøm.

The song is an up-tempo number, in which Strøm sings about the difficulties she faces in life. The cure for these, she sings, is to borrow some of the mystique of Mata Hari, to whom she addresses the song. The sexual exploits of the famous woman are implied to have been considerable.

== Description ==
Composers Frode Thingnæs and Philip A. Kruse, one of Strøm's close friends were invited by the Norwegian Broadcaster NRK to write a song for the Norsk Melodi Grand Prix 1976, and the result was "Mata Hari". The song was inspired by the composers doing research about their descriptions about spies and romance to contemplate into a composition, the term describing to the 100th birth anniversary of the spy Mata Hari herself. The song was one of five that participated in the Norwegian final at NRK Marienlyst in Oslo on February 7, 1976. The song was last in the competition and was performed by Gudny Aspaas on the slow-beat rock tempo while Anne-Karine Strøm on a groovy style tune.

A public jury of a thousand people chose the song until a clear winner wins. "Mata Hari" got 643 points, almost twice the number of second place "Voodoo". Despite the superb victory, the winning song did not hit, and it did not enter the VG list.

While VG thought Norway had finally chosen a winning song with an advance in the Eurovision Song Contest, the people were not very positive. After the finale, the newspaper's watch phone glowed, and the comments were numerous: "After this muck, I'll give away my color television if you come and pick it up," said a man from Ålesund. An unknown woman said that her 6-year-old daughter had urged to turn off the sound while the Grand Prix went on air and She was admired by pictures. NRK's switchboard was also called down by irritated TV viewers, and Aftenposten summarized the finale as stated "possibly worse than ever".

== Eurovision Song Contest ==
The song was recorded and revamped in English while the preparation for the Eurovision Song Contest as stated in the rules.

The song was performed ninth on the night, following the Netherlands' Sandra Reemer with "The Party's Over" and preceding Greece's Mariza Koch with "Panagia mou, panagia mou". At the close of voting, it had received 7 points, placing 18th (last) in a field of 18.

Strøm had represented Norway at Eurovision twice before, once in 1973 as part of vocal group the Bendik Singers and again as a solo performer in the 1974 contest.

As of 2024, Strøm still holds the record as the only artist in the history of Eurovision to have finished in last place twice. The first time came in 1974 with the song "The First Day of Love".

Anne was succeeded as Norwegian representative at the 1977 contest by Anita Skorgan with "Casanova".

== See also ==
- Mata Hari (Samira Efendi song)
