= Norway in the Eurovision Song Contest 2001 =

- Eurovision Song Contest 2001
- Participating broadcaster: Norsk rikskringkasting (NRK)
- Country: Norway
- Selection process: Melodi Grand Prix 2001
- Selection date: 24 February 2001

Competing entry
- Song: "On My Own"
- Artist: Haldor Lægreid
- Songwriters: Tom-Steinar Hanssen; Ole Henrik Antonsen; Ole Jørgen Olsen

Placement
- Final result: 22nd, 3 points

Participation chronology

Norway was represented at the Eurovision Song Contest 2001 with the song "On My Own", written by Ole Henrik Antonsen, Tom-Steinar Hanssen, and Ole Jørgen Olsen, and performed by Haldor Lægreid. The Norwegian participating broadcaster, Norsk rikskringkasting (NRK), organised the national final Melodi Grand Prix 2001 in order to select its entry for the contest. Twelve entries competed in a show that took place on 24 February 2001 and the winner was determined over two rounds of voting from a five-member jury panel and a regional televote. The top four entries in the first round of voting advanced to the competition's second round—the superfinal. In the second round of voting, "On My Own" performed by Haldor Lægreid was selected as the winner.

Norway competed in the Eurovision Song Contest which took place on 12 May 2001. Performing during the show in position 4, Norway placed twenty-second (joint last) out of the 23 participating countries, scoring 3 points.

== Background ==
Prior to the 2001 contest, Norsk rikskringkasting (NRK) had participated in the Eurovision Song Contest representing Norway 40 times since its first entry in 1960. It had won the contest on two occasions: in 1985 with the song "La det swinge" performed by Bobbysocks!, and in 1995 with the song "Nocturne" performed by Secret Garden. It also had the two distinctions of having finished last in the Eurovision final more than any other country and for having the most nul points (zero points) in the contest, the latter being a record the nation shared together with Austria. The country had finished last seven times and had failed to score a point during four contests.

As part of its duties as participating broadcaster, NRK organises the selection of its entry in the Eurovision Song Contest and broadcasts the event in the country. The broadcaster has traditionally organised the national final Melodi Grand Prix to select its entry for the contest in all but one of its participation. The broadcaster organized Melodi Grand Prix 2001 in order to select its 2001 entry.

== Before Eurovision ==
=== Melodi Grand Prix 2001 ===
Melodi Grand Prix 2001 was the 40th edition of the Norwegian national final Melodi Grand Prix, that was organised by NRK to select its entry for the Eurovision Song Contest 2001. The show took place on 24 February 2001 at the Oslo Spektrum in Oslo, hosted by Hans Christian Andersen and was televised on NRK1 as well as streamed online at NRK's official website nrk.no. The national final was watched by 1.309 million viewers in Norway.

==== Competing entries ====
Artists and composers were directly invited by NRK to compete in the national final. Twelve songs were selected for the competition and the competing acts and songs were revealed on 2 February 2001. Short clips of the competing entries were also released alongside the announcement, while the songs in their entirety were premiered between 19 and 22 February during the NRK P1 radio programmes Musikkrevyen and Nitimen.

Artist	Song	Songwriter(s)
Are Sigvardsen	"Is She the One"	Are Sigvardsen
BIAZ	"Your Heart Belongs to Me"	Lars Berg
Camilla Fagerås	"Free"	Ken Ingwersen, Jon-Willy Rydningen, Svein Finneide
Elin Torset	"Brighter than Light"	Elin Torset
Haldor Lægreid	"On My Own"	Ole Henrik Antonsen, Tom-Steinar Hanssen, Ole Jørgen Olsen
Lars-Fredrik	"Show Me the Way"	Elias Muri, Bottolf Lødemel, Lars Aass
Marianne Ligaard	"Every Night Is Saturday Night"	Bottolf Lødemel, Lars Aass
Mocci	"You've Got the Motion"	Stein Johan Grieg Halvorsen, Erlend Klarholm Nilsen, Mocci Ryen
Rasmus Høgset	"Looking for Love"	Jan Johansen, Thomas Heinonen, Brad Johnson
Rebecca	"U Ain't Seen the Best of Me Yet"	Rebecca Wolsdal
Remy	"Still an Angel"	Øivind Madsen, Leif Johansen
Rune Rudberg	"Without You"	Rune Rudberg

==== Final ====
Twelve songs competed during the final on 24 February 2001 and the winner was selected by a combination of votes from regional televoting (5/7) and an expert jury (2/7) over two rounds. In the first round, the results of the public televote were divided into Norway's five regions and each region distributed points as follows: 1–10, 12 and 14 points. The jury then distributed points that had a weighting equal to the votes of two televoting regions and the top four entries were selected to proceed to the second round, the superfinal. In the superfinal, each televoting region distributed points as follows: 8, 10, 12 and 14 points. The jury then distributed points that again had a weighting equal to the votes of two televoting regions, leading to the victory of "On My Own" performed by Haldor Lægreid. The jury panel consisted of Jostein Pedersen (Eurovision Song Contest commentator for Norway), Cecilie Bjelke (international promoter for artists at Universal Music), Inger Beate Jacobsen (NRK P1 radio host), Jarl Aanestad (songwriter and music producer) and Hege Tepstad (NRK P1 radio host).

In addition to the performances of the competing entries, the interval act featured performances of several past Eurovision entries: Jahn Teigen performed the 1978 Norwegian entry "Mil etter mil", Carola Häggkvist performed the 1983 Swedish entry "Främling" and the Swedish 1991 winning entry "Fångad av en stormvind", and Charmed performed the 2000 Norwegian entry "My Heart Goes Boom". Teigen also performed his 1989 Melodi Grand Prix entry "Optimist" and together with Häggkvist performed the Israeli 1979 Eurovision winning entry "Hallelujah".

Following Melodi Grand Prix 2001, several viewers complained that they were unable to vote through SMS as they were provided with the wrong instructions for the voting. Marketing director of NRK aktivum, Lene Hordvik, later confirmed that a number of SMS votes were not counted towards the final result due to heavy traffic but they were not enough to change the winner.

Final – 24 February 2001
R/O	Artist	Song	Jury	Televoting Regions					Total	Place
R/O	Artist	Song	Jury	Tromsø	Trondheim	Bergen	Kristiansand	Oslo	Total	Place
1	Marianne Ligaard	"Every Night Is Saturday Night"	12	4	3	5	4	6	34	8
2	Rasmus Høgset	"Looking for Love"	8	9	9	9	9	8	52	6
3	Mocci	"You've Got the Motion"	20	10	10	10	10	10	70	3
4	Remy	"Still an Angel"	28	5	5	6	6	5	55	4
5	Camilla Fagerås	"Free"	10	6	4	4	5	3	32	9
6	Rune Rudberg	"Without You"	16	7	7	7	7	9	53	5
7	Are Sigvardsen	"Is She the One"	14	2	2	2	3	4	27	10
8	Rebecca	"U Ain't Seen the Best of Me Yet"	4	3	6	3	2	2	20	11
9	Elin Torset	"Brighter than Light"	18	12	14	14	12	12	82	2
10	Lars-Fredrik	"Show Me the Way"	2	1	1	1	1	1	7	12
11	BIAZ	"Your Heart Belongs to Me"	6	8	8	8	8	7	45	7
12	Haldor Lægreid	"On My Own"	24	14	12	12	14	14	90	1

Superfinal – 24 February 2001
R/O	Artist	Song	Jury	Televoting Regions					Total	Place
R/O	Artist	Song	Jury	Tromsø	Trondheim	Bergen	Kristiansand	Oslo	Total	Place
1	Remy	"Still an Angel"	24	8	8	8	8	8	64	4
2	Mocci	"You've Got the Motion"	16	10	10	10	10	10	66	3
3	Elin Torset	"Brighter than Light"	20	12	14	14	12	12	84	2
4	Haldor Lægreid	"On My Own"	28	14	12	12	14	14	94	1

== At Eurovision ==
The Eurovision Song Contest 2001 took place at Parken Stadium in Copenhagen, Denmark, on 12 May 2001. The relegation rules introduced for the 1997 contest were again utilised ahead of the 2001 contest, based on each country's average points total in previous contests. The 23 participants were made up of the host country, the "Big Four" (France, Germany, Spain, and the United Kingdom), and the 12 countries with the highest average scores between the 1996 and 2000 contests competed in the final. On 21 November 2000, an allocation draw was held which determined the running order and Norway was set to perform in position 4, following the entry from Bosnia and Herzegovina and before the entry from Israel. Norway finished in twenty-second (joint last) place with 3 points.

The contest was broadcast on NRK1 (with commentary by Jostein Pedersen) and on radio station NRK P1 (with commmentary by Stein Dag Jensen and Hege Tepstad).

=== Voting ===
Below is a breakdown of points awarded to Norway and awarded by Norway in the contest. The nation awarded its 12 points to Denmark in the contest.

NRK appointed Roald Øyen as its spokesperson to announce the Norwegian votes during the show.

Points awarded to Norway
Score	Country
12 points	
10 points	
8 points	
7 points	
6 points	
5 points	
4 points	
3 points	Portugal
2 points	
1 point	

Points awarded by Norway
Score	Country
12 points	Denmark
10 points	Estonia
8 points	Greece
7 points	France
6 points	Slovenia
5 points	Malta
4 points	Spain
3 points	Germany
2 points	Sweden
1 point	Iceland
