= Oslo City art award =

Norwegian award

The Oslo City Art Award (Oslo bys kunstnerpris) is given annually for contributions to the arts by the city of Oslo, Norway.

The Oslo City Art Award has been awarded every year since 1978 with the exception of 1991 when the prize was not awarded due to a lack of funding. Since inception, the prize has been distributed to 4-5 recipients annually. The prize is "awarded to individuals who in the past or in recent years has made an outstanding achievement in Oslo's art world". The prize consists of a diploma and a monetary amount. The award is most often made simultaneously with the presentation of the Oslo City Culture Award, which consists of a bronze medal and a monetary amount.

== See also ==
- List of European art awards
- Kampen Janitsjarorkester
