= Norway in the Eurovision Song Contest =

- Eurovision Song Contest
- Participating broadcaster: Norsk rikskringkasting (NRK)

Participation summary
- Appearances: 64 (61 finals)
- First appearance: 1960
- Highest placement: 1st: 1985, 1995, 2009
- Host: 1986, 1996, 2010
- Participation history: 1960; 1961; 1962; 1963; 1964; 1965; 1966; 1967; 1968; 1969; 1970; 1971; 1972; 1973; 1974; 1975; 1976; 1977; 1978; 1979; 1980; 1981; 1982; 1983; 1984; 1985; 1986; 1987; 1988; 1989; 1990; 1991; 1992; 1993; 1994; 1995; 1996; 1997; 1998; 1999; 2000; 2001; 2002; 2003; 2004; 2005; 2006; 2007; 2008; 2009; 2010; 2011; 2012; 2013; 2014; 2015; 2016; 2017; 2018; 2019; ~~2020~~; 2021; 2022; 2023; 2024; 2025; 2026

Related articles
- Melodi Grand Prix

External links
- NRK page
- Norway's page at Eurovision.com
- For the most recent participation see Norway in the Eurovision Song Contest 2026

Norway has been represented at the Eurovision Song Contest 64 times since making its debut in 1960 and has only been absent twice since then. In 1970, the country boycotted the contest over disagreements about the voting structure, and in 2002, they were relegated. The Norwegian participating broadcaster in the contest is Norsk rikskringkasting (NRK), which selects its entrant with the national competition Melodi Grand Prix.

Before 1985, Norway's best result in the contest was a third-place with "Intet er nytt under solen" by Åse Kleveland in 1966. Norway's three victories in the contest were achieved by "La det swinge" by Bobbysocks in 1985, "Nocturne" by Secret Garden in 1995, and "Fairytale" by Alexander Rybak in 2009. Norway also finished second at the 1996 contest, with "I evighet" by former Bobbysocks member Elisabeth Andreassen. Norway has finished last in twelve Eurovision finals, of which four times with "nul points". Norway has a total of 12 top-five results in the contest, the latest being a fifth place with "Queen of Kings" by Alessandra in 2023.

== Participation ==
Norsk rikskringkasting (NRK) is a full member of the European Broadcasting Union (EBU), thus eligible to participate in the Eurovision Song Contest. It has participated in the contest representing Norway since its fifth edition in 1960.

== History ==
NRK's first entrant in the contest was "Voi Voi" performed by Nora Brockstedt in 1960, who finished fourth; Brockstedt would return the next year with "Sommer i Palma", this time placing seventh. "Intet er nytt under solen" by Åse Kleveland then finished third in 1966, following which Norway would fail to reach the top ten in fourteen out of their next fifteen attempts, with the exception being "It's Just a Game" by the Bendik Singers, which placed seventh in 1973. Before 1985, Norway had only received a top-ten score in six out of twenty-four attempts, and had finished last the same number of times.

Bobbysocks gave the country its first victory in 1985, with the song "La det swinge". Norway went on to achieve two more top five results over the next ten years, with Karoline Krüger in 1988 and Silje Vige in 1993, who both finished fifth.

Norway's second victory came in 1995 with Secret Garden's mainly instrumental Celtic-influenced ethno-piece "Nocturne". In 1996, Elisabeth Andreassen, who had won the contest as one half of Bobbysocks, returned to the contest as a solo artist, finishing in second place. In 2003, Jostein Hasselgård came fourth.

Norway won for the third time in 2009, with Alexander Rybak and his song "Fairytale". The song's score of 387 points was the highest ever winning total under the 1975-2015 voting system, and also achieved the biggest ever margin of victory: 492 points in total were distributed between the competing countries in 2009, meaning "Fairytale" received 78.7% of the points that could be rewarded. Rybak later returned to the contest in 2018, performing "That's How You Write a Song"; he received the highest number of votes of the second semi-final, but ultimately placed fifteenth. He remains the only Norwegian entrant to have won a semi-final, as well as the only two-time semi-final winner in the history of the contest.

In 2024, Norway finished last in the final for the twelfth time. Norway has the dubious distinction of finishing last in the Eurovision final more than any other country, and along with Austria, has received "nul points" (zero points) in the contest on four occasions; in 1963, 1978, 1981 and 1997.

Since the introduction of the semi-final round in 2004, Norway has finished in the top ten eight times. Wig Wam finished ninth in 2005, Maria Haukaas Storeng was fifth in 2008, Alexander Rybak won in 2009, Margaret Berger was fourth in 2013, Carl Espen finished eighth in 2014, Mørland and Debrah Scarlett finished eighth in 2015, Jowst finished tenth in 2017, Keiino won the public vote and finished sixth overall in 2019, Subwoolfer finished tenth in 2022, and Alessandra finished fifth in 2023. In total, Norway has 12 top-five and 27 top-ten finishes in the contest.

== Participation overview ==
Table key
1	First place
2	Second place
3	Third place
◁	Last place
◇	Entry selected but did not compete

Year	Artist	Song	Language	Final	Points	Semi	Points
1960	Nora Brockstedt	"Voi-voi"	Norwegian	4	11	No semi-finals	
1961	Nora Brockstedt	"Sommer i Palma"	Norwegian	7	10	No semi-finals	
1962	Inger Jacobsen	"Kom sol, kom regn"	Norwegian	10	2	No semi-finals	
1963	Anita Thallaug	"Solhverv"	Norwegian	13 ◁	0	No semi-finals	
1964	Arne Bendiksen	"Spiral"	Norwegian	8	6	No semi-finals	
1965	Kirsti Sparboe	"Karusell"	Norwegian	13	1	No semi-finals	
1966	Åse Kleveland	"Intet er nytt under solen"	Norwegian	3	15	No semi-finals	
1967	Kirsti Sparboe	"Dukkemann"	Norwegian	14	2	No semi-finals	
1968	Odd Børre	"Stress"	Norwegian	13	2	No semi-finals	
1969	Kirsti Sparboe	"Oj, oj, oj, så glad jeg skal bli"	Norwegian	16 ◁	1	No semi-finals	
1971	Hanne Krogh	"Lykken er"	Norwegian	17	65	No semi-finals	
1972	Grethe Kausland and Benny Borg	"Småting"	Norwegian	14	73	No semi-finals	
1973	Bendik Singers	"It's Just a Game"	English, French	7	89	No semi-finals	
1974	Anne-Karine and the Bendik Singers	"The First Day of Love"	English	14 ◁	3	No semi-finals	
1975	Ellen Nikolaysen	"Touch My Life with Summer"	English	18	11	No semi-finals	
1976	Anne-Karine Strøm	"Mata Hari"	English	18 ◁	7	No semi-finals	
1977	Anita Skorgan	"Casanova"	Norwegian	14	18	No semi-finals	
1978	Jahn Teigen	"Mil etter mil"	Norwegian	20 ◁	0	No semi-finals	
1979	Anita Skorgan	"Oliver"	Norwegian	11	57	No semi-finals	
1980	Sverre Kjelsberg and Mattis Hætta	"Sámiid ædnan"	Norwegian	16	15	No semi-finals	
1981	Finn Kalvik	"Aldri i livet"	Norwegian	20 ◁	0	No semi-finals	
1982	Jahn Teigen and Anita Skorgan	"Adieu"	Norwegian	12	40	No semi-finals	
1983	Jahn Teigen	"Do Re Mi"	Norwegian	9	53	No semi-finals	
1984	Dollie de Luxe	"Lenge leve livet"	Norwegian	17	29	No semi-finals	
1985	Bobbysocks	"La det swinge"	Norwegian	1	123	No semi-finals	
1986	Ketil Stokkan	"Romeo"	Norwegian	12	44	No semi-finals	
1987	Kate Gulbrandsen	"Mitt liv"	Norwegian	9	65	No semi-finals	
1988	Karoline Krüger	"For vår jord"	Norwegian	5	88	No semi-finals	
1989	Britt Synnøve Johansen	"Venners nærhet"	Norwegian	17	30	No semi-finals	
1990	Ketil Stokkan	"Brandenburger Tor"	Norwegian	21 ◁	8	No semi-finals	
1991	Just 4 Fun	"Mrs. Thompson"	Norwegian	17	14	No semi-finals	
1992	Merethe Trøan	"Visjoner"	Norwegian	18	23	No semi-finals	
1993	Silje Vige	"Alle mine tankar"	Norwegian	5	120	Kvalifikacija za Millstreet	
1994	Elisabeth Andreasson and Jan Werner Danielsen	"Duett"	Norwegian	6	76	No semi-finals	
1995	Secret Garden	"Nocturne"	Norwegian	1	148	No semi-finals	
1996	Elisabeth Andreassen	"I evighet"	Norwegian	2	114	Host country	
1997	Tor Endresen	"San Francisco"	Norwegian	24 ◁	0	No semi-finals	
1998	Lars A. Fredriksen	"Alltid sommer"	Norwegian	8	79	No semi-finals	
1999	Van Eijk	"Living My Life Without You"	English	14	35	No semi-finals	
2000	Charmed	"My Heart Goes Boom"	English	11	57	No semi-finals	
2001	Haldor Lægreid	"On My Own"	English	22 ◁	3	No semi-finals	
2003	Jostein Hasselgård	"I'm Not Afraid to Move On"	English	4	123	No semi-finals	
2004	Knut Anders Sørum	"High"	English	24 ◁	3	Top 11 in 2003 contest (Note: According to the then-Eurovision rules, the top ten non-Big Four countries from the previous year along with the Big Four automatically qualified for the Grand Final without having to compete in semi-finals. For example, if Germany and France placed inside the top ten, the 11th and 12th spots were advanced to next year's Grand Final along with all countries ranked in the top ten.)	
2005	Wig Wam	"In My Dreams"	English	9	125	6	164
2006	Christine Guldbrandsen	"Alvedansen"	Norwegian	14	36	Top 11 in 2005 final	
2007	Guri Schanke	"Ven a bailar conmigo"	English	Failed to qualify		18	48
2008	Maria	"Hold On Be Strong"	English	5	182	4	106
2009	Alexander Rybak	"Fairytale"	English	1	387	1	201
2010	Didrik Solli-Tangen	"My Heart Is Yours"	English	20	35	Host country	
2011	Stella Mwangi	"Haba Haba"	English, Swahili	Failed to qualify		17	30
2012	Tooji	"Stay"	English	26 ◁	7	10	45
2013	Margaret Berger	"I Feed You My Love"	English	4	191	3	120
2014	Carl Espen	"Silent Storm"	English	8	88	6	77
2015	Mørland and Debrah Scarlett	"A Monster Like Me"	English	8	102	4	123
2016	Agnete	"Icebreaker"	English	Failed to qualify		13	63
2017	Jowst (Note: Performance contains uncredited live vocals from Aleksander Walmann)	"Grab the Moment"	English	10	158	5	189
2018	Alexander Rybak	"That's How You Write a Song"	English	15	144	1	266
2019	Keiino	"Spirit in the Sky"	English, Northern Sámi	6	331	7	210
2020	Ulrikke ◇	"Attention" ◇	English ◇	Contest cancelled (Note: The 2020 contest was cancelled due to the COVID-19 pandemic.)			
2021	Tix	"Fallen Angel"	English	18	75	10	115
2022	Subwoolfer	"Give That Wolf a Banana"	English	10	182	6	177
2023	Alessandra	"Queen of Kings"	English	5	268	6	102
2024	Gåte	"Ulveham"	Norwegian	25 ◁	16	10	43
2025	Kyle Alessandro	"Lighter"	English	18	89	8	82
2026	Jonas Lovv	"Ya Ya Ya"	English	14	134	4	206
2027	Confirmed intention to participate †						

== Hostings ==
Year	Location	Venue	Presenters
1986	Bergen	Grieghallen	Åse Kleveland
1996	Oslo	Oslo Spektrum	Ingvild Bryn and Morten Harket
2010	Oslo	Telenor Arena	Nadia Hasnaoui, Haddy N'jie and Erik Solbakken

In addition to the contest proper, Norway hosted Songs of Europe, a special concert programme commemorating the contest's 25th anniversary, at Momarken in Mysen. The show, which was broadcast on 22 August 1981, was presented by Rolf Kirkvaag and Titten Tei.

== Awards ==
=== Marcel Bezençon Awards ===
Year	Category	Song	Composer(s) lyrics (l) / music (m)	Performer	Final	Points	Host city	Ref.
2009	Press Award	"Fairytale"	Alexander Rybak (m & l)	Alexander Rybak	1	387	(Russia) Moscow	
2015	Composer Award	"A Monster Like Me"	Kjetil Mørland (m & l)	Mørland & Debrah Scarlett	8	102	(Austria) Vienna	

=== Winner by OGAE members ===
Year	Song	Performer	Place	Points	Host city	Ref.
2009	"Fairytale"	Alexander Rybak	1	387	(Russia) Moscow	

== Related involvement ==
=== Conductors ===
Year	Conductor (Note: All conductors are of Norwegian nationality unless otherwise noted.)	Musical director	Notes	Ref.
1960	Øivind Bergh	N/A		
1961	Øivind Bergh	N/A		
1962	Øivind Bergh	N/A		
1963	Øivind Bergh	N/A		
1964	Karsten Andersen	N/A		
1965	Øivind Bergh	N/A		
1966	Øivind Bergh	N/A		
1967	Øivind Bergh	N/A		
1968	Øivind Bergh	N/A		
1969	Øivind Bergh	N/A		
1971	Arne Bendiksen	N/A	(Note: Conducted by Egil Monn-Iversen at the national finals.)	
1972	Carsten Klouman	N/A	(Note: Conducted by Egil Monn-Iversen at the national finals.)	
1973	Carsten Klouman	N/A	(Note: Conducted by Egil Monn-Iversen at the national finals.)	
1974	Frode Thingnæs	N/A	(Note: Conducted by Egil Monn-Iversen at the national finals.)	
1975	Carsten Klouman	N/A		
1976	Frode Thingnæs	N/A	(Note: Conducted by Helge Hurum at the national final.)	
1977	Carsten Klouman	N/A		
1978	Carsten Klouman	N/A		
1979	Sigurd Jansen	N/A	(Note: Conducted by Egil Monn-Iversen at the national finals.)	
1980	Sigurd Jansen	N/A	(Note: Conducted by Egil Monn-Iversen at the national finals.)	
1981	Sigurd Jansen	N/A	(Note: Conducted by Egil Monn-Iversen at the national finals.)	
1982	Sigurd Jansen	N/A	(Note: Conducted by Egil Monn-Iversen at the national finals.)	
1983	Sigurd Jansen	N/A	(Note: Conducted by Egil Monn-Iversen at the national finals.)	
1984	Sigurd Jansen	N/A	(Note: Conducted by Egil Monn-Iversen at the national finals.)	
1985	Terje Fjærn	N/A		
1986	Egil Monn-Iversen		(Note: Also conducted the Danish entry. Fred Nøddelund conducted at the national final.)	
1987	Terje Fjærn	N/A		
1988	Arild Stav	N/A	(Note: The song was performed without orchestral accompaniment at the national final.)	
1989	Pete Knutsen	N/A		
1990	Pete Knutsen	N/A		
1991	Pete Knutsen	N/A		
1992	Rolf Løvland	N/A		
1993	Rolf Løvland	N/A		
1994	Pete Knutsen	N/A		
1995	Geir Langslet	N/A		
1996	Frode Thingnæs		(Note: Conducted by Geir Langslet at the national final.)	
1997	Geir Langslet	N/A		
1998	Geir Langslet	N/A		

Additionally, there was an orchestra present at the 1999 national final, conducted by Geir Langslet (the winning song, however, was presented without orchestral accompaniment) and at the 2015 national final, conducted by Anders Eljas.

=== Heads of delegation ===
Year	Head of delegation	Ref.
1998–2005	Jon Ola Sand	
2006–2009, 2012–2015	Stian Malme	
2010–2011	Skjalg Solstad	
2016–2024	Stig Karlsen	
2025	Mads Tørklep	

=== Supervisors ===
List of supervisors of Melodi Grand Prix, better known as MGP-general or GP-general in Norway:

Year	Head of delegation	Ref.
c. 2007–2012	Per Sundnes	
2013–2015	Vivi Stenberg	
2016–2017	Jan Fredrik Karlsen	
2018–2024	Stig Karlsen	
2025	Tarjei Strøm	

=== Commentators and spokespersons ===
Television and radio commentators and spokespersons
Year	Television		Radio		Spokesperson	Ref.
Year	Channel	Commentator(s)	Channel	Commentator(s)	Spokesperson	Ref.
1960	NRK Fjernsynet	Erik Diesen	NRK	Erik Diesen	Unknown	
1961	NRK Fjernsynet	Leif Rustad	NRK	Leif Rustad	Unknown	
1962	NRK Fjernsynet	Odd Grythe	NRK	Odd Grythe	Unknown	
1963	NRK Fjernsynet	Øivind Johnssen	NRK	Øivind Johnssen	Unknown	
1964	NRK Fjernsynet	Odd Grythe	NRK	Odd Grythe	Unknown	
1965	NRK Fjernsynet	Erik Diesen	NRK	Erik Diesen	Unknown	
1966	NRK Fjernsynet	Sverre Christophersen	NRK	Sverre Christophersen	Erik Diesen	
1967	NRK Fjernsynet	Erik Diesen	NRK	Erik Diesen	Sverre Christophersen	
1968	NRK Fjernsynet	Roald Øyen	NRK	Roald Øyen	Unknown	
1969	NRK Fjernsynet	Sverre Christophersen (Note: The connection between the commentary booth in Madrid and the NRK studios in Oslo was disabled partway through the broadcast, resulting in the Norwegian commentary provided by Sverre Christophersen not being relayed to Norwegian viewers and listeners. Commentary was temporarily provided by Janka Polanyi before the Swedish feed was rerouted to also cover the Norwegian broadcasts, with the original connection to Christophersen ultimately fixed before the start of the voting sequence.)	NRK	Sverre Christophersen	Janka Polanyi	
1970	No broadcast				Did not participate	
1971	NRK Fjernsynet	Sverre Christophersen	NRK	Sverre Christophersen	No spokesperson	
1972	NRK Fjernsynet	Roald Øyen	NRK	Roald Øyen	No spokesperson	
1973	NRK Fjernsynet	John Andreassen	NRK	John Andreassen	No spokesperson	
1974	NRK Fjernsynet	John Andreassen	NRK	Erik Heyerdahl	Unknown	
1975	NRK Fjernsynet	John Andreassen	NRK	John Andreassen	Unknown	
1976	NRK Fjernsynet	Jo Vestly	NRK	Erik Heyerdahl	Unknown	
1977	NRK Fjernsynet	John Andreassen	NRK	Erik Heyerdahl	Unknown	
1978	NRK Fjernsynet	Bjørn Scheele	NRK	Erik Heyerdahl	Unknown	
1979	NRK Fjernsynet	Egil Teige	NRK	Erik Heyerdahl	Unknown	
1980	NRK Fjernsynet	Knut Aunbu	NRK	Erik Heyerdahl	Unknown	
1981	NRK Fjernsynet	Knut Aunbu	NRK	Erik Heyerdahl	Unknown	
1982	NRK Fjernsynet	Bjørn Scheele	NRK	Erik Heyerdahl	Unknown	
1983	NRK Fjernsynet	Ivar Dyrhaug	NRK	Erik Heyerdahl	Unknown	
1984	NRK Fjernsynet	Roald Øyen	NRK	Erik Heyerdahl	Unknown	
1985	NRK Fjernsynet	Veslemøy Kjendsli	NRK P1, NRK P2	Jahn Teigen and Erik Heyerdahl	Unknown	
1986	NRK Fjernsynet	Knut Bjørnsen	NRK P1, NRK P2	Knut Bjørnsen	Unknown	
1987	NRK Fjernsynet	John Andreassen	NRK P2	John Andreassen	Unknown	
1988	NRK Fjernsynet	John Andreassen	NRK P2	John Andreassen	Andreas Diesen	
1989	NRK Fjernsynet	John Andreassen	NRK P2	John Andreassen	Unknown	
1990	NRK Fjernsynet	Leif Erik Forberg	NRK P2	Leif Erik Forberg	Unknown	
1991	NRK Fjernsynet	John Andreassen and Jahn Teigen	NRK P2	John Andreassen and Jahn Teigen	Unknown	
1992	NRK Fjernsynet	John Andreassen	NRK P2	Leif Erik Forberg and Vidar Lønn-Arnesen	Unknown	
1993	NRK Fjernsynet	Leif Erik Forberg	NRK P2	Leif Erik Forberg	Unknown	
1994	NRK Fjernsynet	Jostein Pedersen	NRK P1	Jostein Pedersen	Sverre Christophersen	
1995	NRK Fjernsynet	Annette Groth	NRK P1	Stein Dag Jensen	Sverre Christophersen	
1996	NRK Fjernsynet	Jostein Pedersen	NRK P1	Stein Dag Jensen and Anita Skorgan	Ragnhild Sælthun Fjørtoft	
1997	NRK1	Jostein Pedersen	NRK P1	Kristian Lindeman	Ragnhild Sælthun Fjørtoft	
1998	NRK1	Jostein Pedersen	NRK P1	Stein Dag Jensen	Ragnhild Sælthun Fjørtoft	
1999	NRK1	Jostein Pedersen	NRK P1	Jon Branæs	Ragnhild Sælthun Fjørtoft	
2000	NRK1	Jostein Pedersen	NRK P1	Stein Dag Jensen	Marit Åslein	
2001	NRK1	Jostein Pedersen	NRK P1	Stein Dag Jensen and Hege Tepstad	Roald Øyen	
2002	NRK1	Jostein Pedersen	No radio broadcast		Did not participate	
2003	NRK1	Jostein Pedersen	NRK P1	Unknown	Roald Øyen	
2004	NRK2 (Semi-final); NRK1 (All shows)	Jostein Pedersen	NRK P1 (Final)	Unknown	Ingvild Helljesen	
2005	NRK1	Jostein Pedersen	NRK P1	Unknown	Ingvild Helljesen	
2006	NRK1	Jostein Pedersen	NRK P1 (Final)	Unknown	Ingvild Helljesen	
2007	NRK1	Per Sundnes	NRK P1 (Final)	Unknown	Synnøve Svabø	
2008	NRK1 (SF1/final); NRK3 (SF2)	Hanne Hoftun	No radio broadcast		Stian Barsnes-Simonsen	
2009	NRK1	Synnøve Svabø	No radio broadcast		Stian Barsnes-Simonsen	
2010	NRK1	Olav Viksmo-Slettan	No radio broadcast		Anne Rimmen	
2011	NRK1	Olav Viksmo-Slettan	No radio broadcast		Nadia Hasnaoui	
2012	NRK1	Olav Viksmo-Slettan	No radio broadcast		Nadia Hasnaoui	
2013	NRK1	Olav Viksmo-Slettan	No radio broadcast		Tooji	
2014	NRK1	Olav Viksmo-Slettan	No radio broadcast		Margrethe Røed	
2015	NRK1	Olav Viksmo-Slettan	NRK P1 (Final)	Per Sundnes	Margrethe Røed	
2015	NRK Tegnspråk	Sign language interpreters	NRK P1 (Final)	Per Sundnes	Margrethe Røed	
2015	NRK3 (Final)	Ronny Brede Aase, Silje Nordnes and Markus Neby	NRK P1 (Final)	Per Sundnes	Margrethe Røed	
2016	NRK1	Olav Viksmo-Slettan	NRK P1 (SF2/Final)	Ole Christian Øen	Elisabeth Andreassen	
2016	NRK3 (Final)	Ronny Brede Aase, Silje Nordnes and Markus Neby	NRK P1 (SF2/Final)	Ole Christian Øen	Elisabeth Andreassen	
2017	NRK1	Olav Viksmo-Slettan	NRK P1 (SF2/Final)	Ole Christian Øen	Marcus & Martinus	
2017	NRK3 (Final)	Ronny Brede Aase, Silje Nordnes and Markus Neby	NRK P1 (SF2/Final)	Ole Christian Øen	Marcus & Martinus	
2017	NRK Tegnspråk (Final)	Sign language interpreters	NRK P1 (SF2/Final)	Ole Christian Øen	Marcus & Martinus	
2018	NRK1	Olav Viksmo-Slettan	NRK P1 (Final)	Ole Christian Øen	Aleksander Walmann and Jowst	
2018	NRK3 (Final)	Ronny Brede Aase, Silje Nordnes and Markus Neby	NRK P1 (Final)	Ole Christian Øen	Aleksander Walmann and Jowst	
2019	NRK1	Olav Viksmo-Slettan	NRK P1 (Final)	Ole Christian Øen	Alexander Rybak	
2019	NRK3 (Final)	Ronny Brede Aase, Silje Nordnes and Markus Neby	NRK P1 (Final)	Ole Christian Øen	Alexander Rybak	
~~2020~~	~~NRK1~~	~~Marte Stokstad~~	Not announced before cancellation			
2021	NRK1	Marte Stokstad	NRK P1 (Final)	Ole Christian Øen	Silje Skjemstad Cruz	
2021	NRK3 (Final)	Martin Lepperød and Adelina Ibishi	NRK P1 (Final)	Ole Christian Øen	Silje Skjemstad Cruz	
2022	NRK1	Marte Stokstad	NRK P1 (Final)	Jon Marius Hyttebakk and Marit Sofie Strand	Tix	
2023	NRK1	Marte Stokstad	NRK P1 (Final)	Jon Marius Hyttebakk	Ben Adams	
2023	NRK3 (Final)	Arian Engebø, Egil Skurdal, Adelina Ibishi and Nate Kahungu	NRK P3 (Final)	Arian Engebø, Egil Skurdal, Adelina Ibishi and Nate Kahungu	Ben Adams	
2024	NRK1	Marte Stokstad	NRK P1 (Final)	Jon Marius Hyttebakk	Ingvild Helljesen	
2025	NRK1	Marte Stokstad	NRK P1 (Final)	Jon Marius Hyttebakk	Tom Hugo	
2026	NRK1	Marte Stokstad	NRK P1 (Final)	Jonas Bergløv and Jon Marius Hyttebakk	Elisabeth Andreassen	

=== Costume designers ===
Year	Costume designers
2007	CåreJånni Enderud

== Photo gallery ==
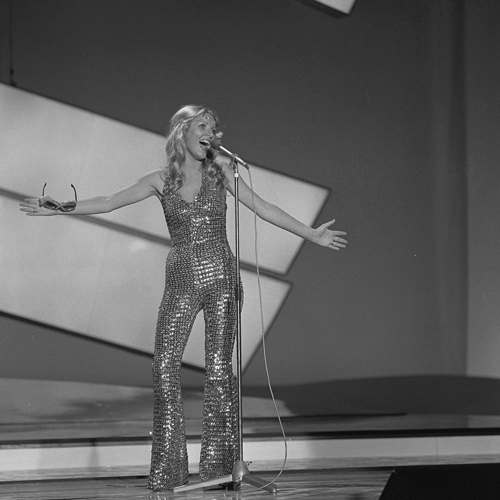
Anne-Karine Strøm performing "Mata Hari" in The Hague (1976)

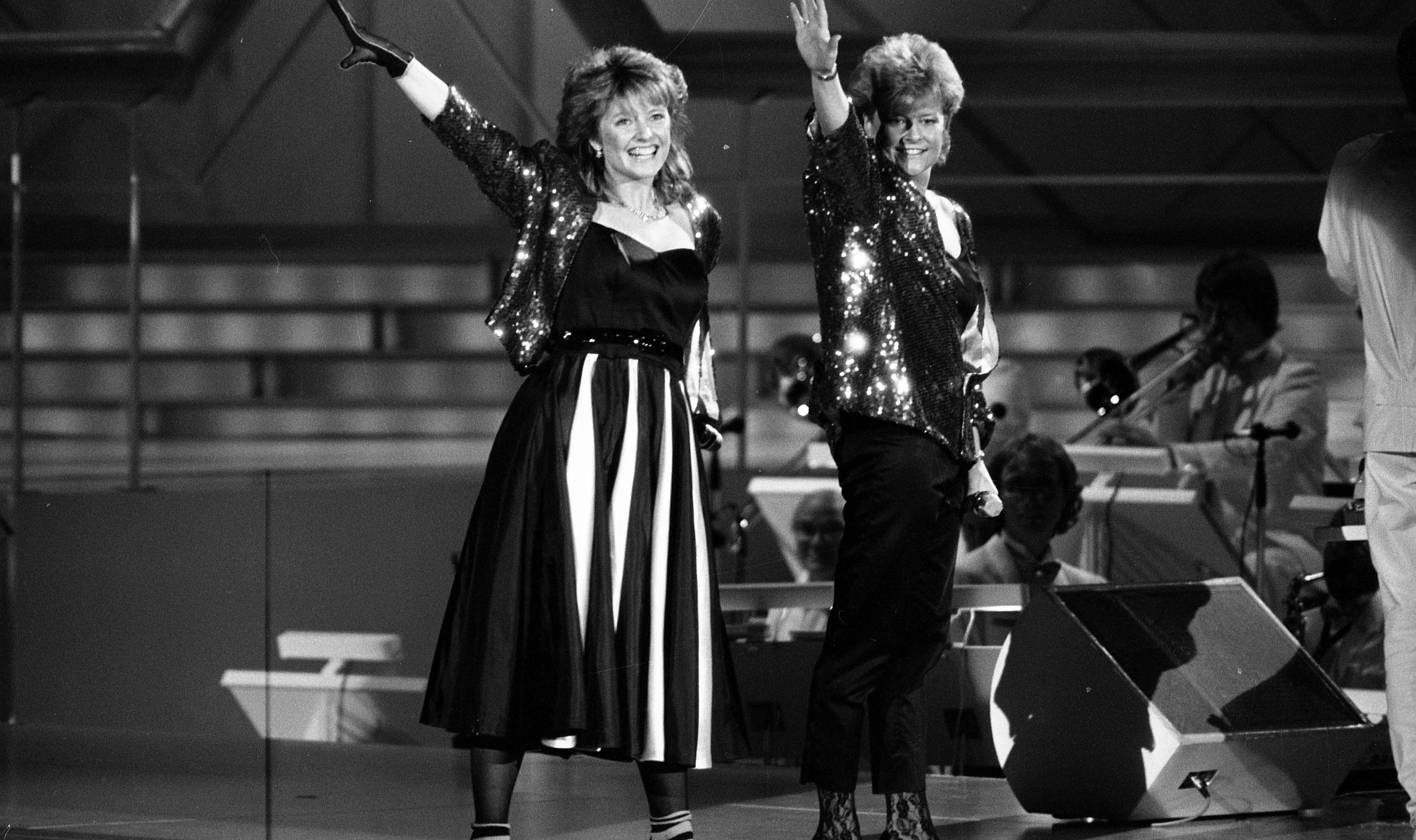
Bobbysocks performing "La det swinge" in Gothenburg (1985)

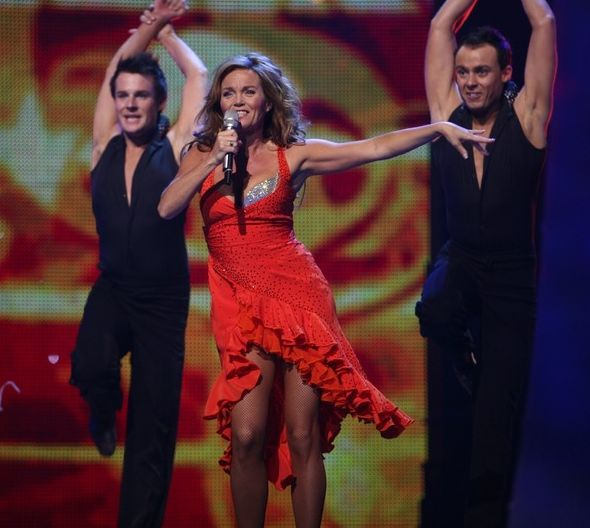
Guri Schanke performing "Ven a bailar conmigo" in Helsinki (2007)

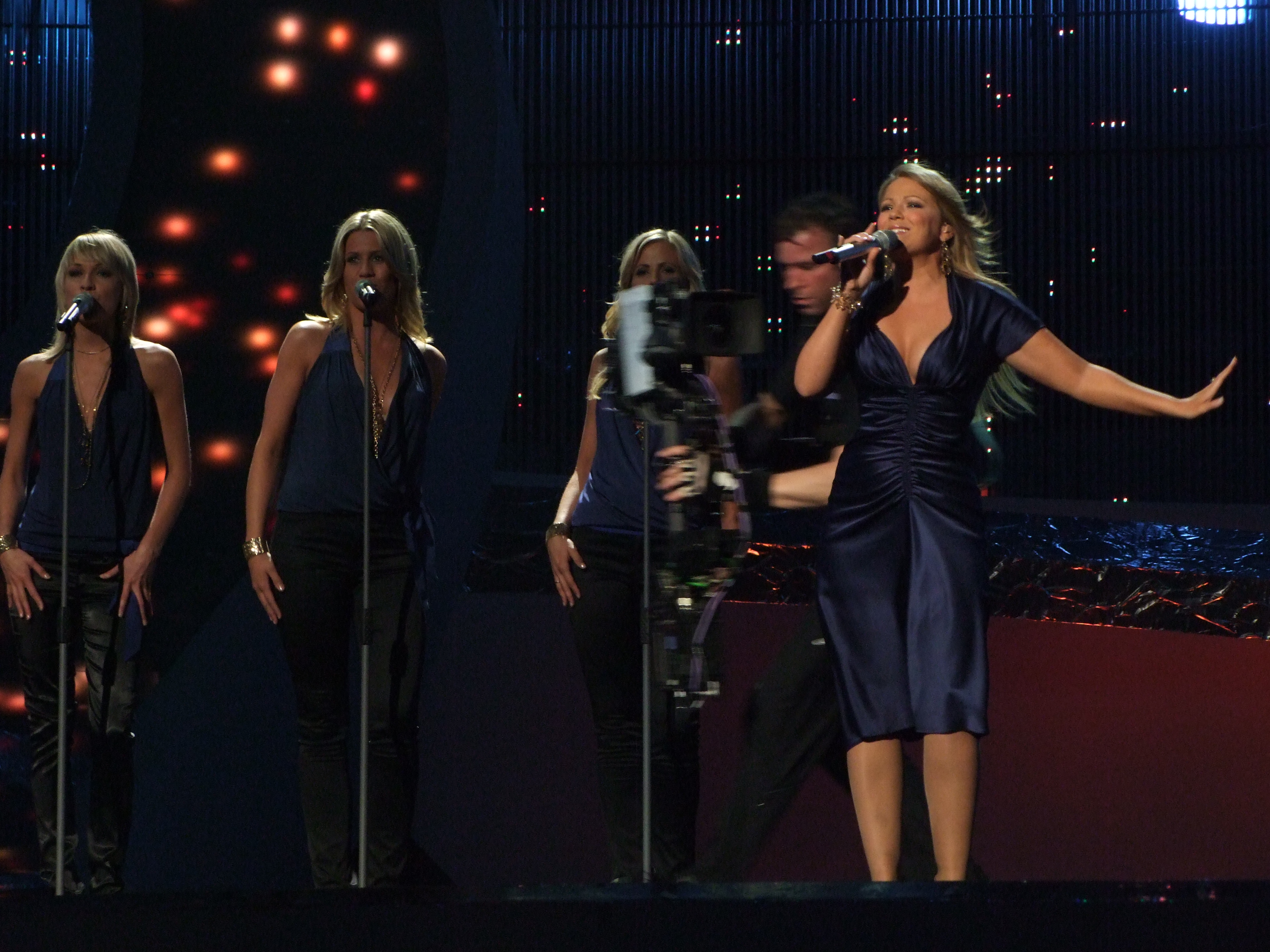
Maria Haukaas Storeng performing "Hold On Be Strong" in Belgrade (2008)

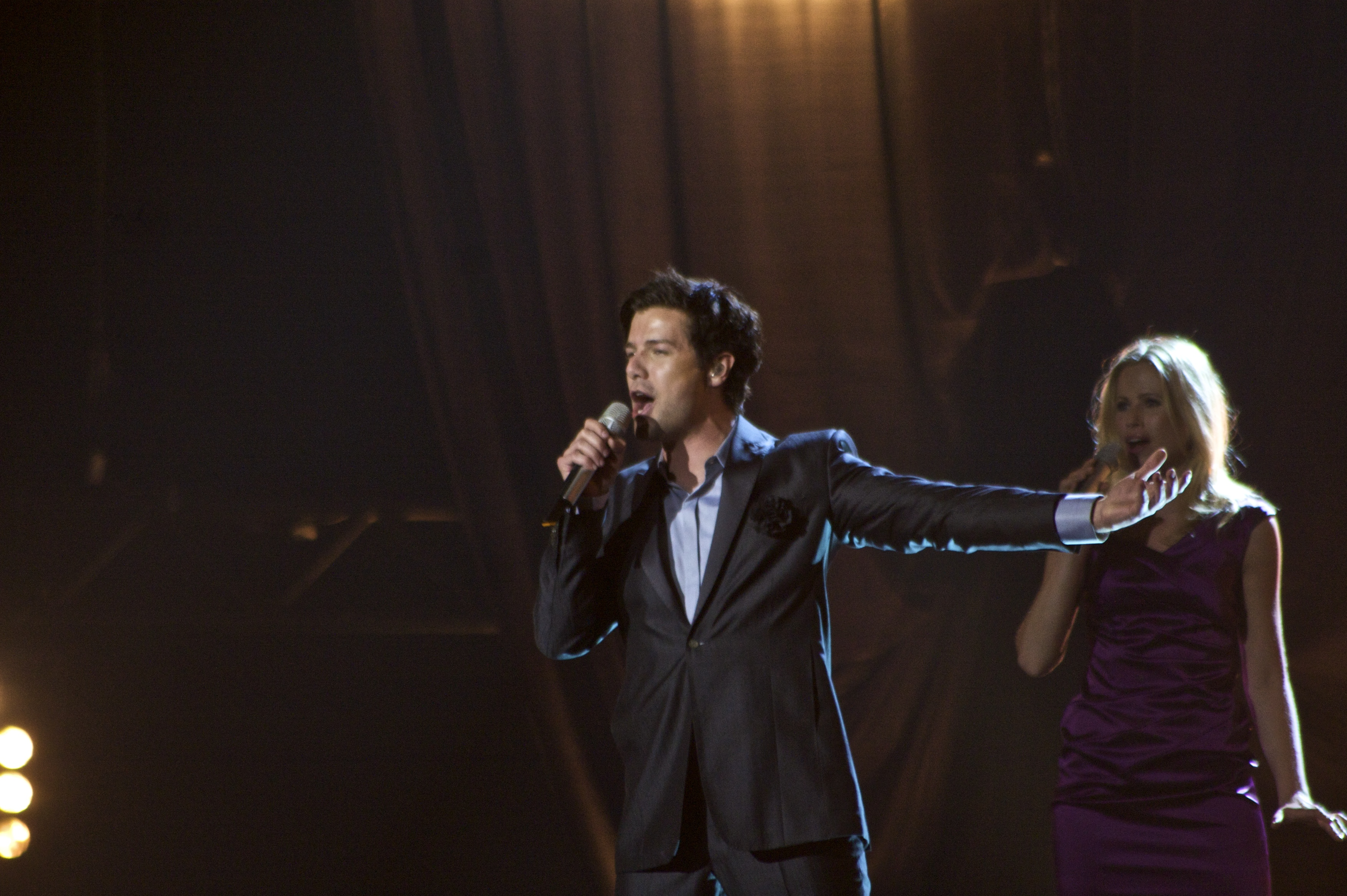
Didrik Solli-Tangen performing "My Heart Is Yours" in Oslo (2010)

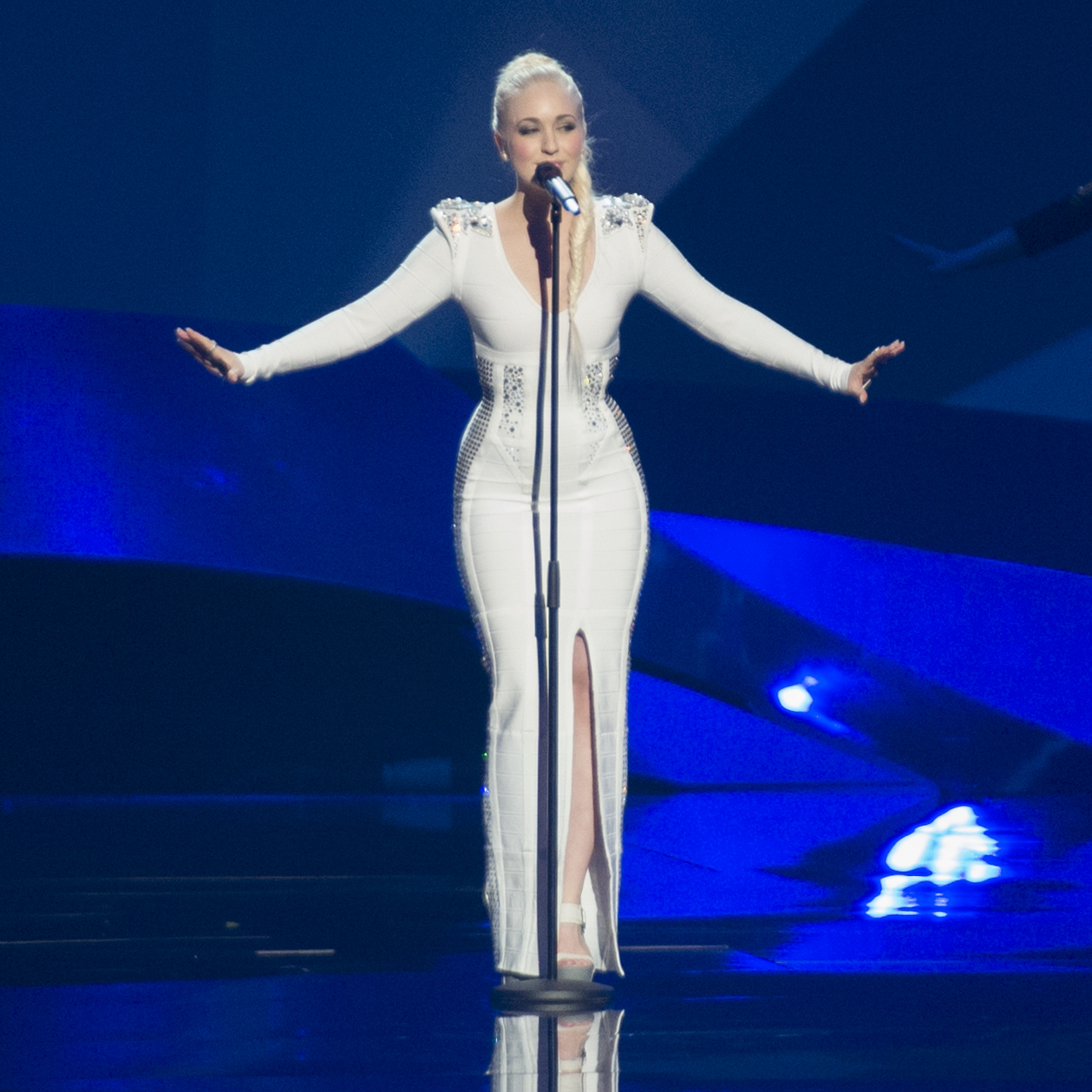
Margaret Berger performing "I Feed You My Love" in Malmö (2013)

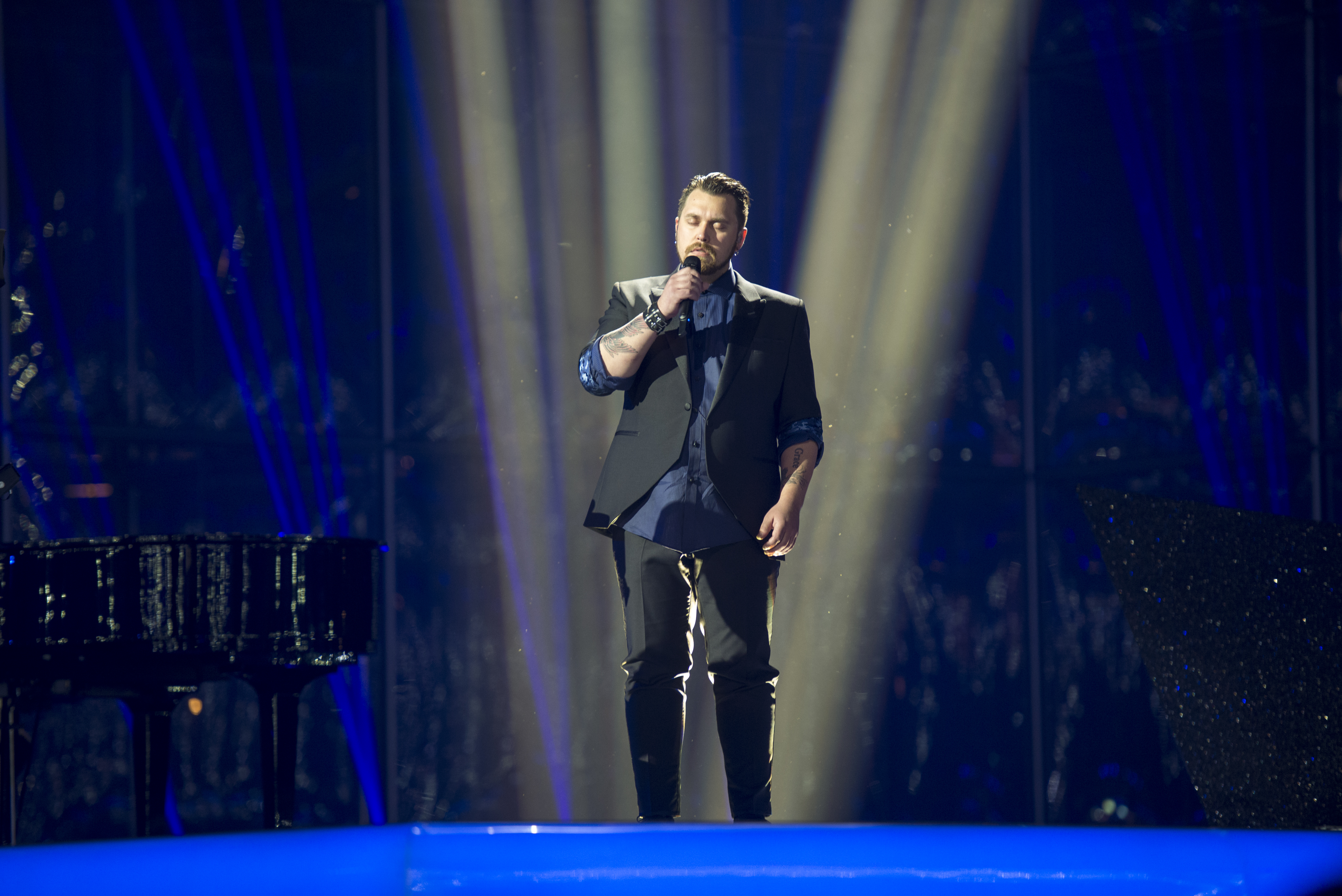
Carl Espen performing "Silent Storm" in Copenhagen (2014)

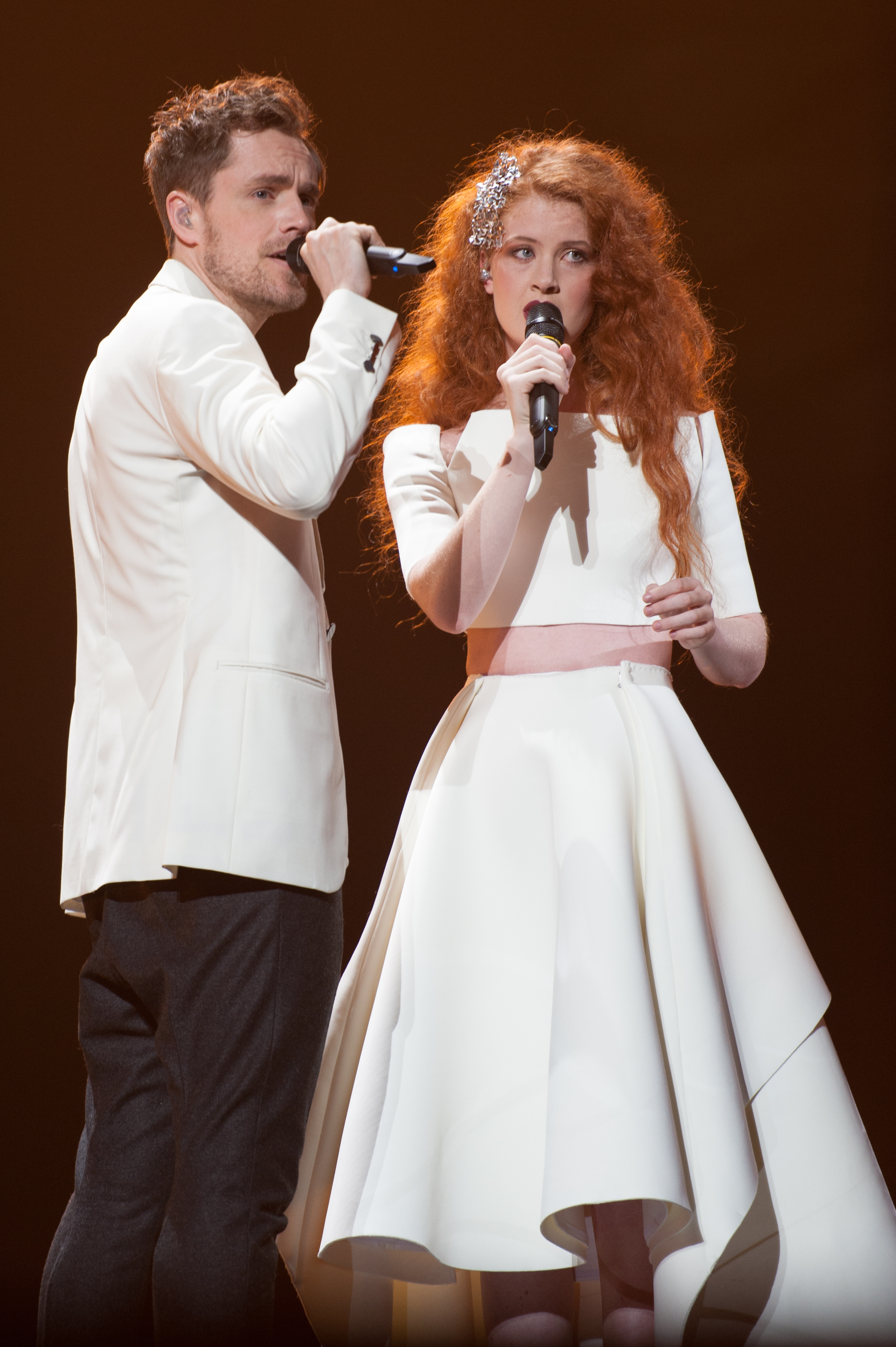
Mørland and Debrah Scarlett performing "A Monster Like Me" in Vienna (2015)

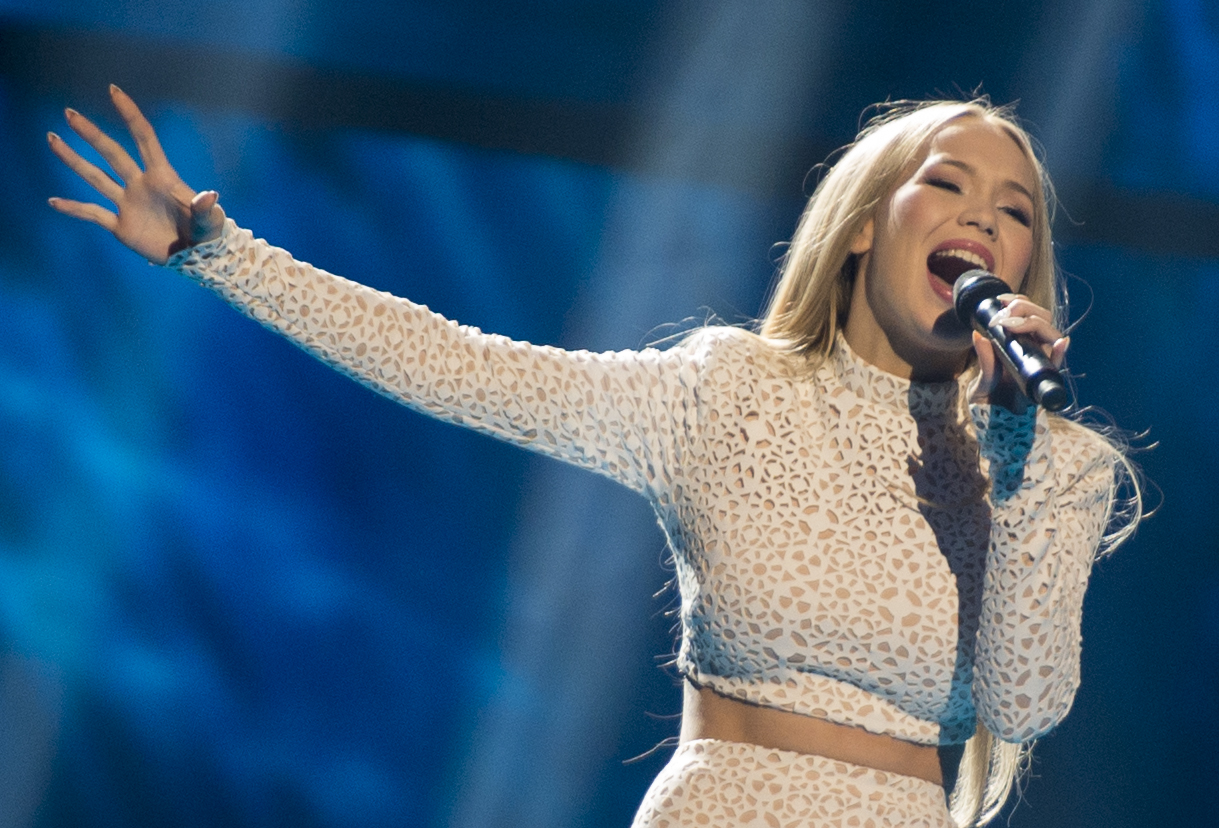
Agnete performing "Icebreaker" in Stockholm (2016)

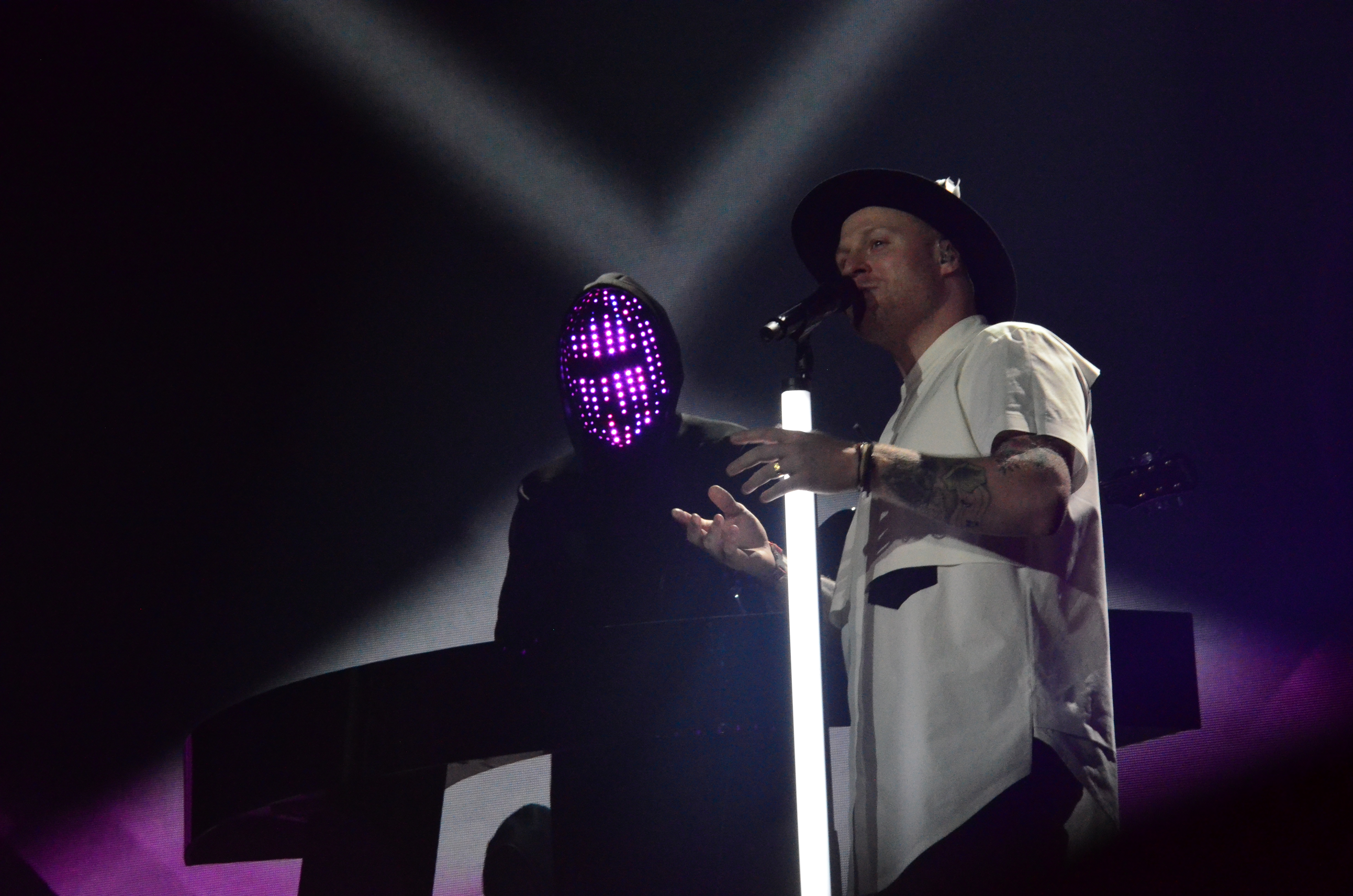
Jowst and Aleksander Walmann performing "Grab the Moment" in Kyiv (2017)

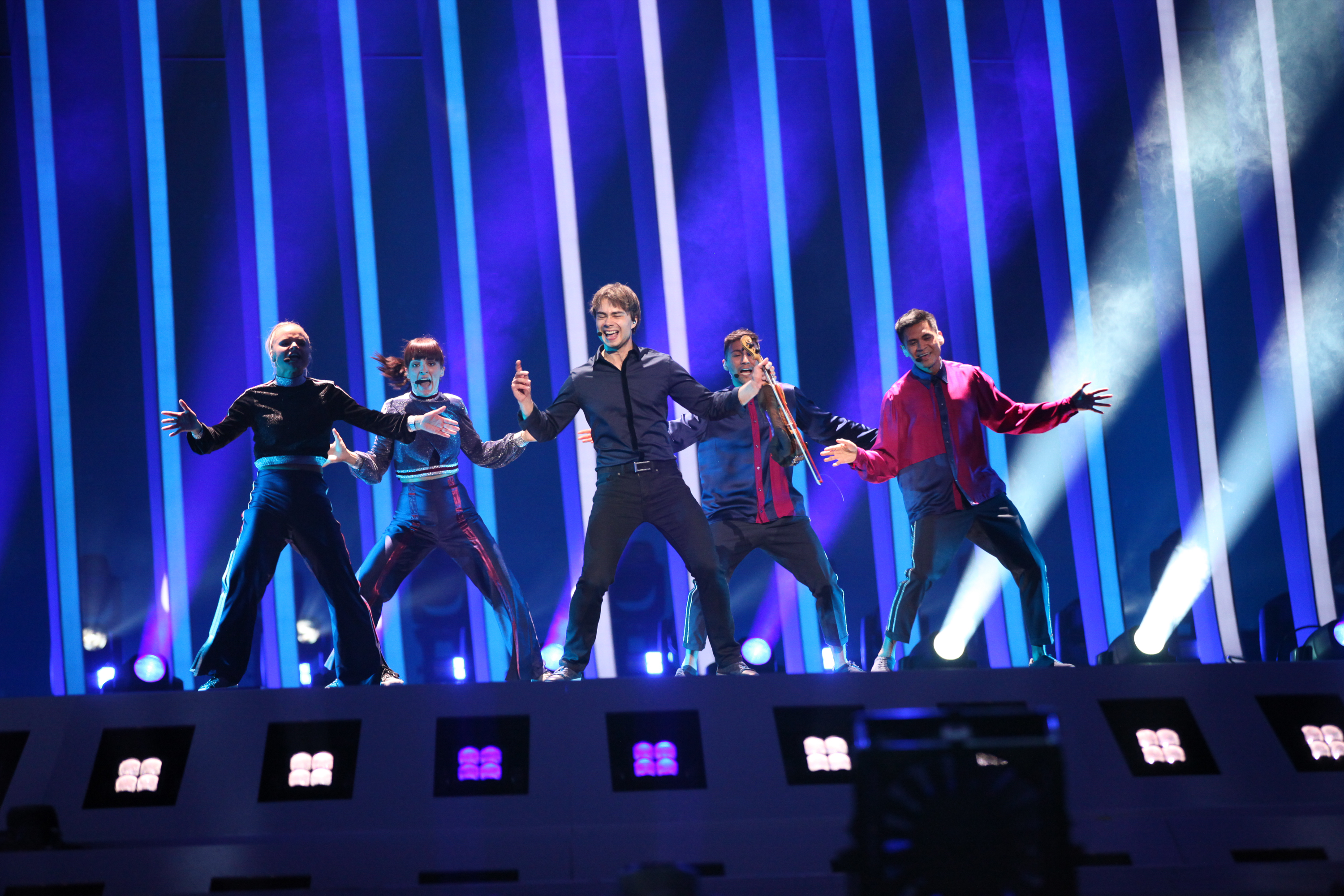
Alexander Rybak performing "That's How You Write a Song" in Lisbon (2018)

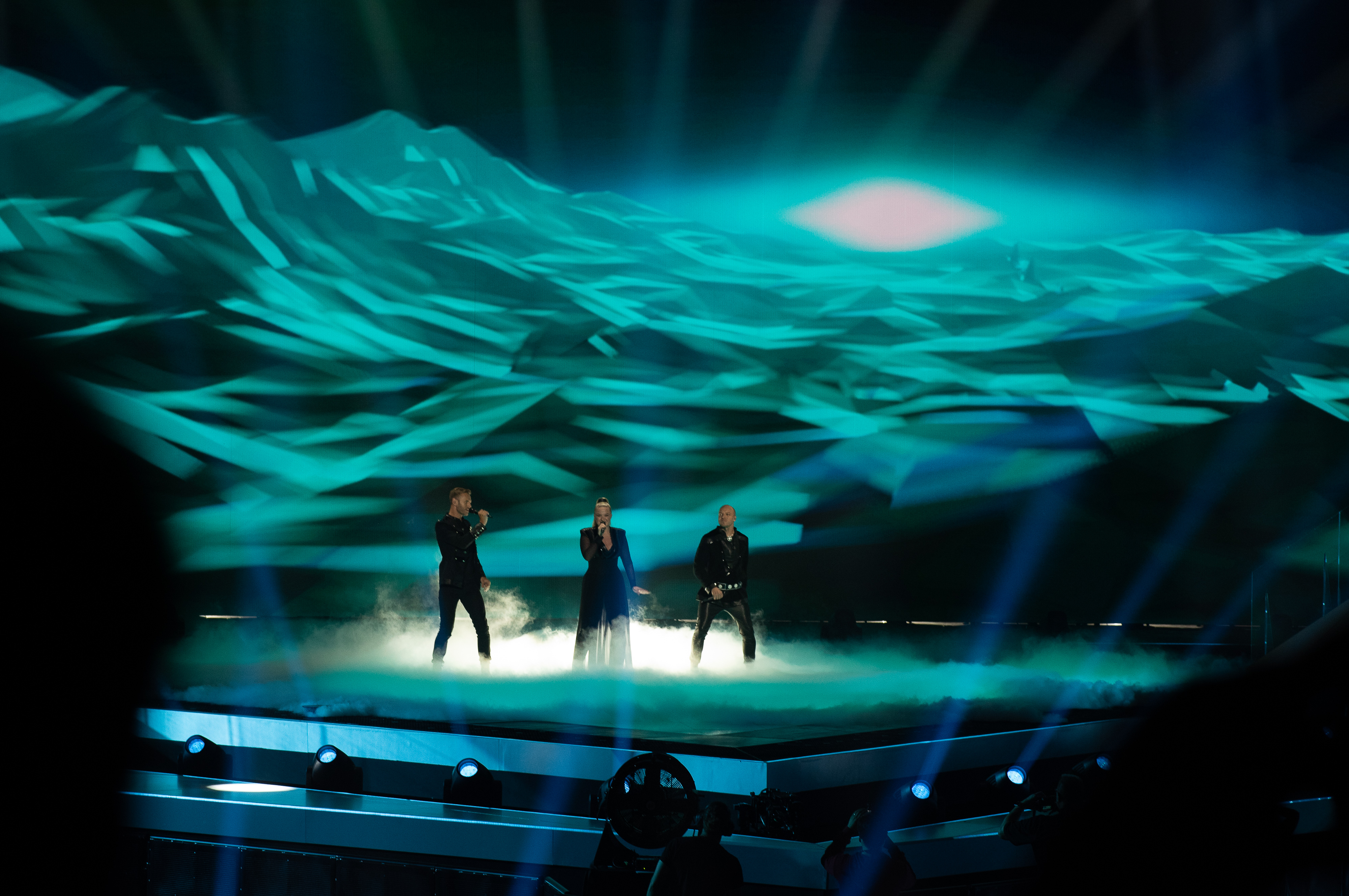
Keiino performing "Spirit in the Sky" in Tel Aviv (2019)

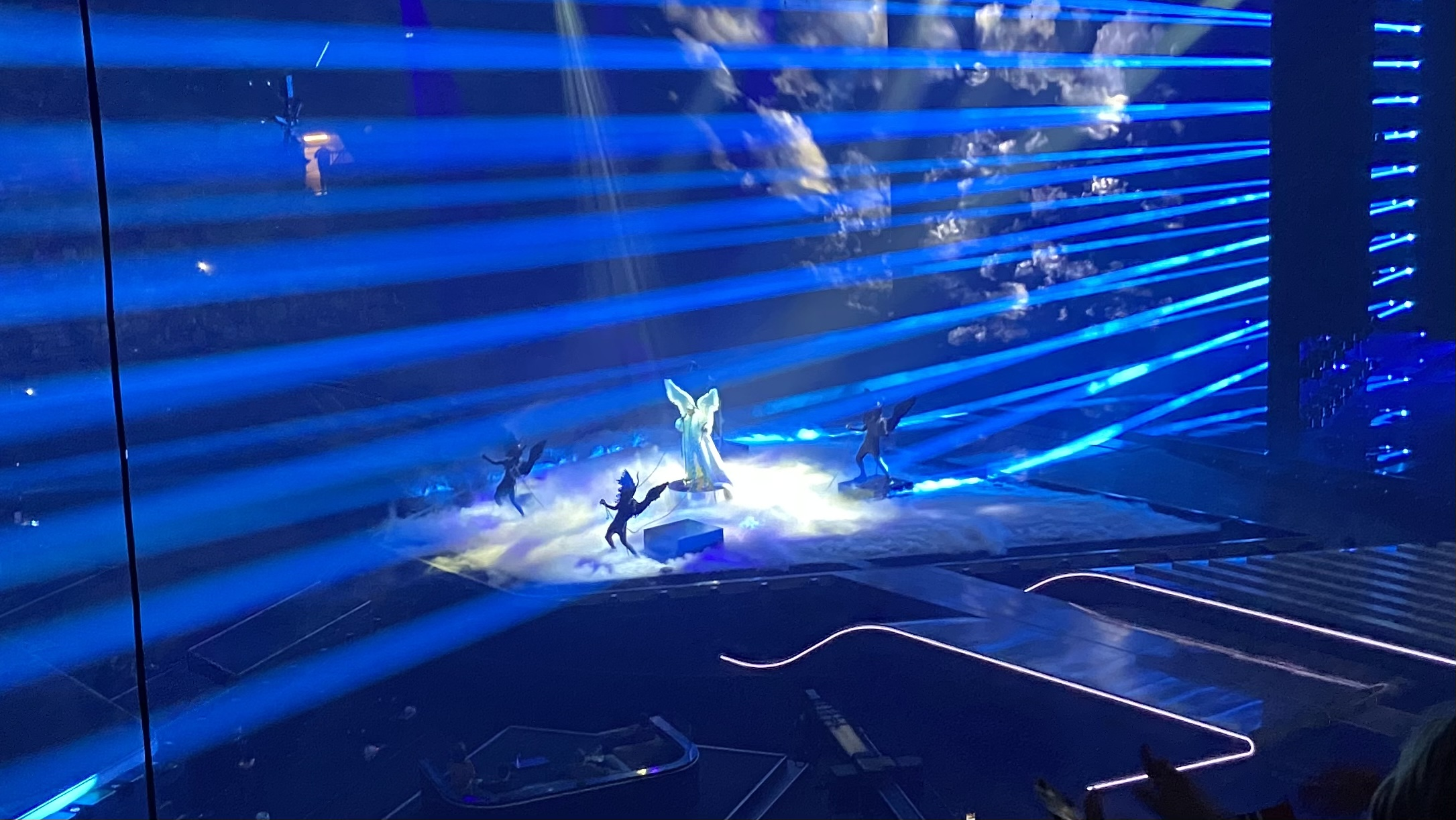
Tix performing "Fallen Angel" in Rotterdam (2021)

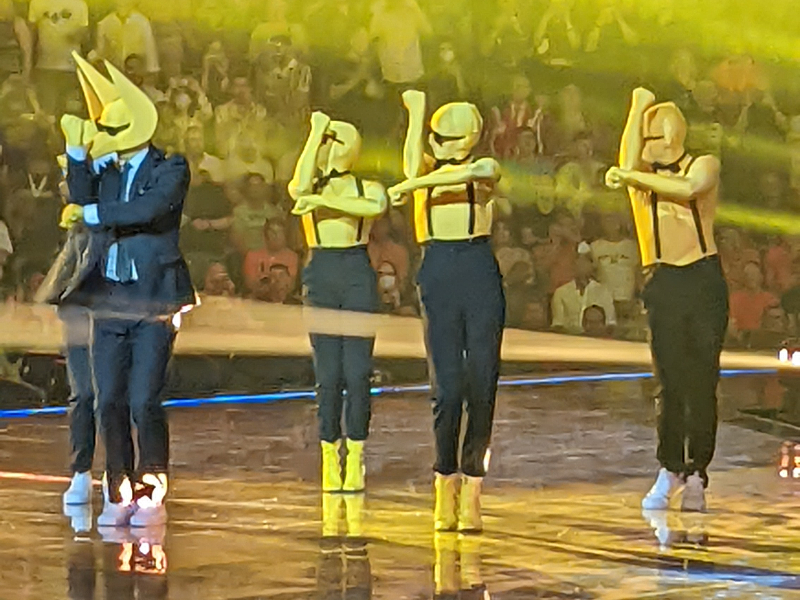
Subwoolfer performing "Give That Wolf a Banana" in Turin (2022)

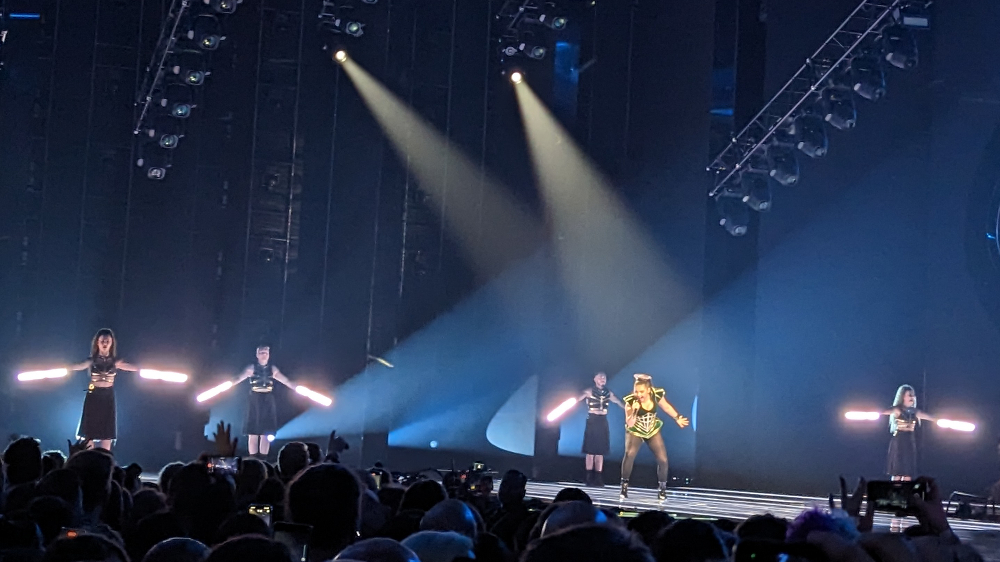
Alessandra performing "Queen of Kings" in Liverpool (2023)

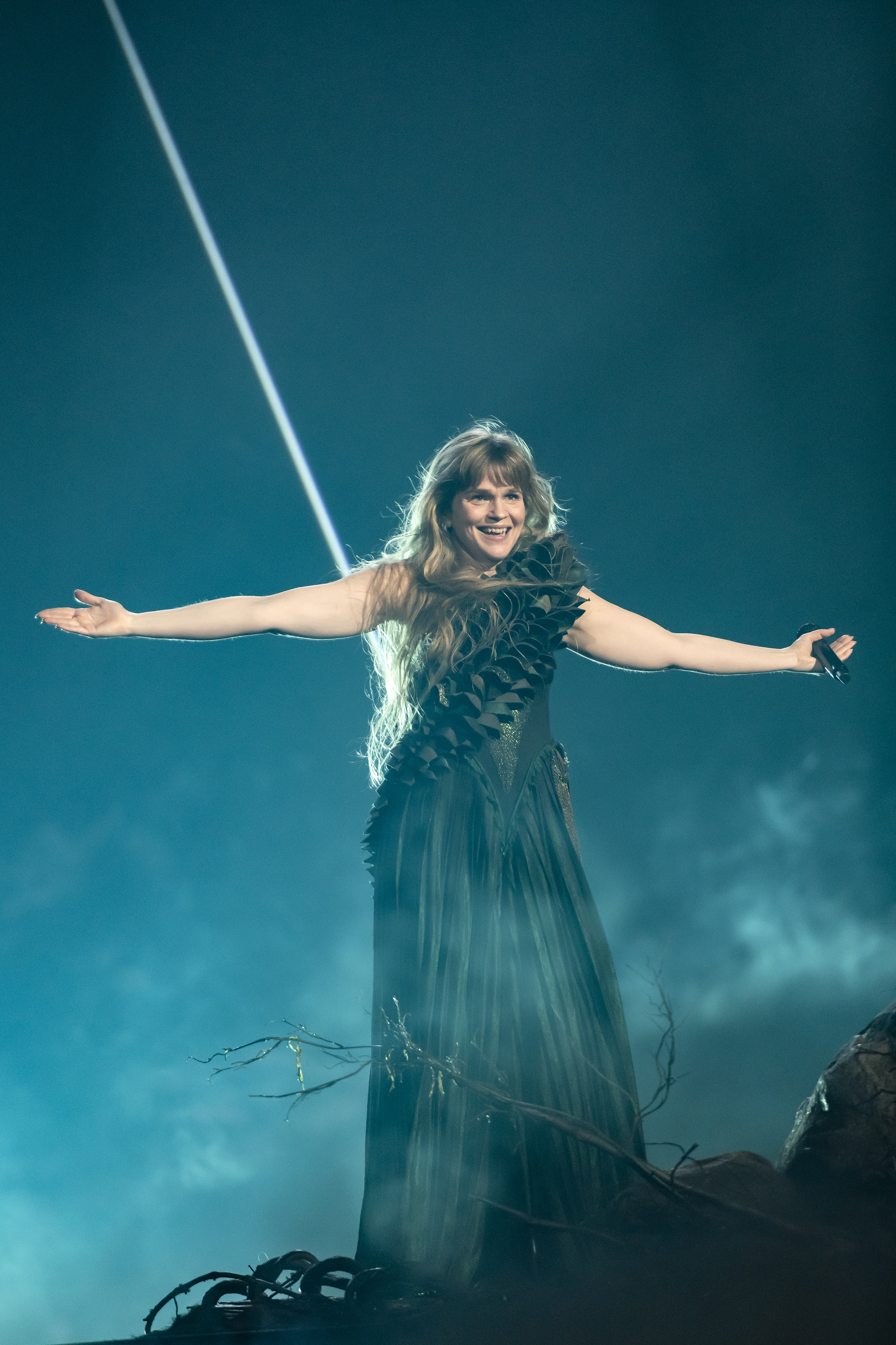
Gåte performing "Ulveham" in Malmö (2024)

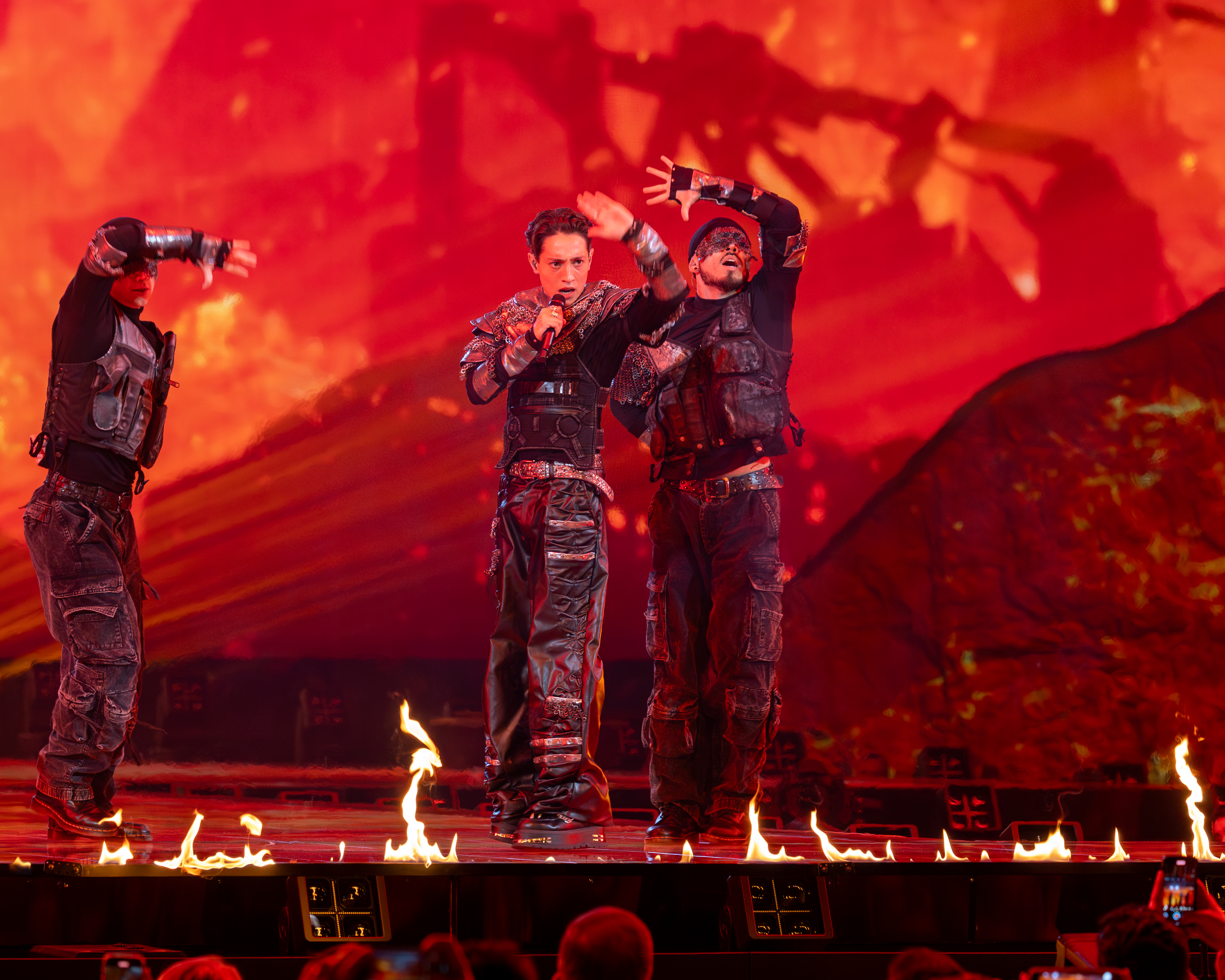
Kyle Alessandro performing "Lighter" in Basel (2025)

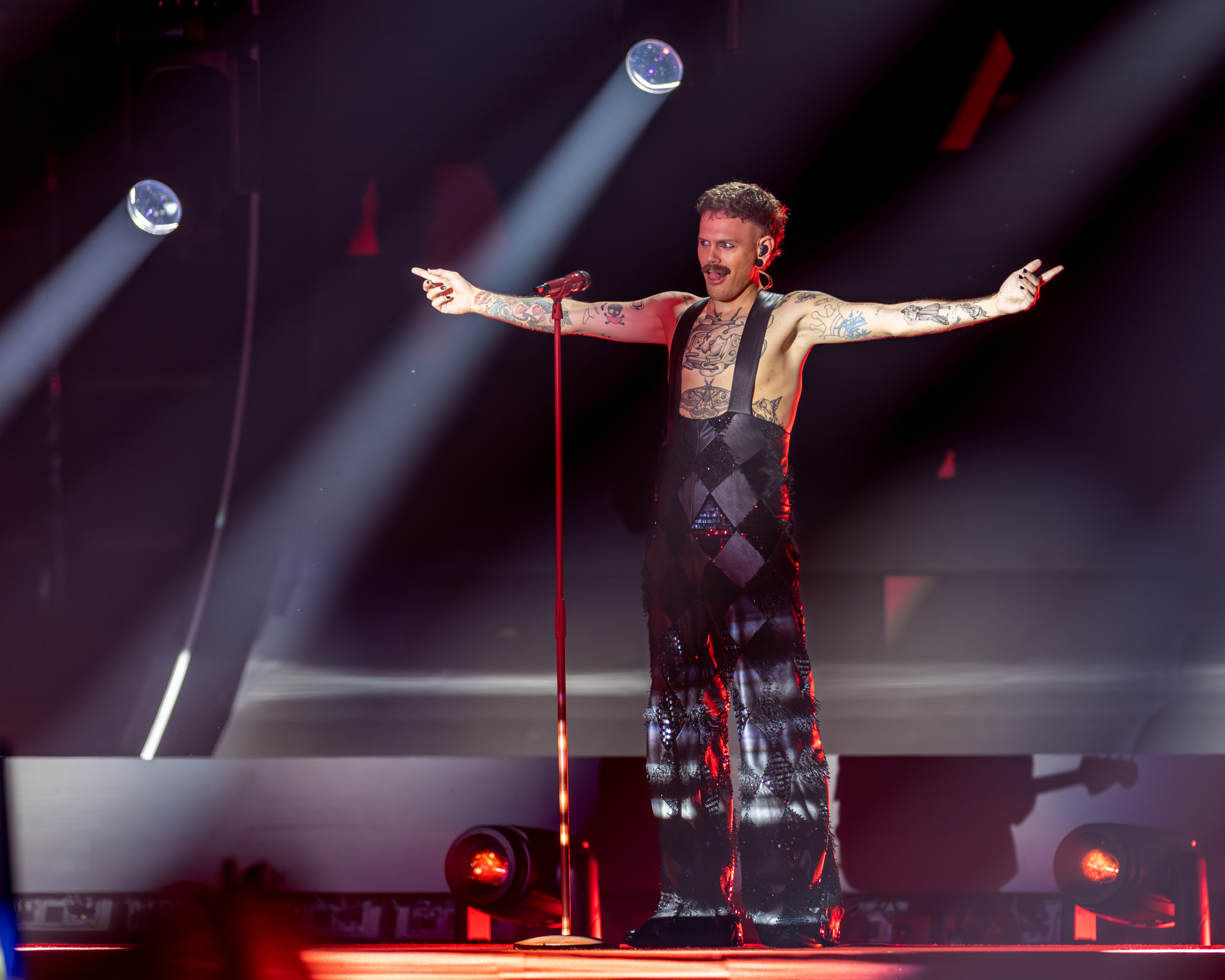
Jonas Lovv performing "Ya Ya Ya" in Vienna (2026)

== See also ==
- Melodi Grand Prix
- Norway in the Junior Eurovision Song Contest – Junior version of the Eurovision Song Contest.
