= Anita Skorgan =

Norwegian singer-songwriter

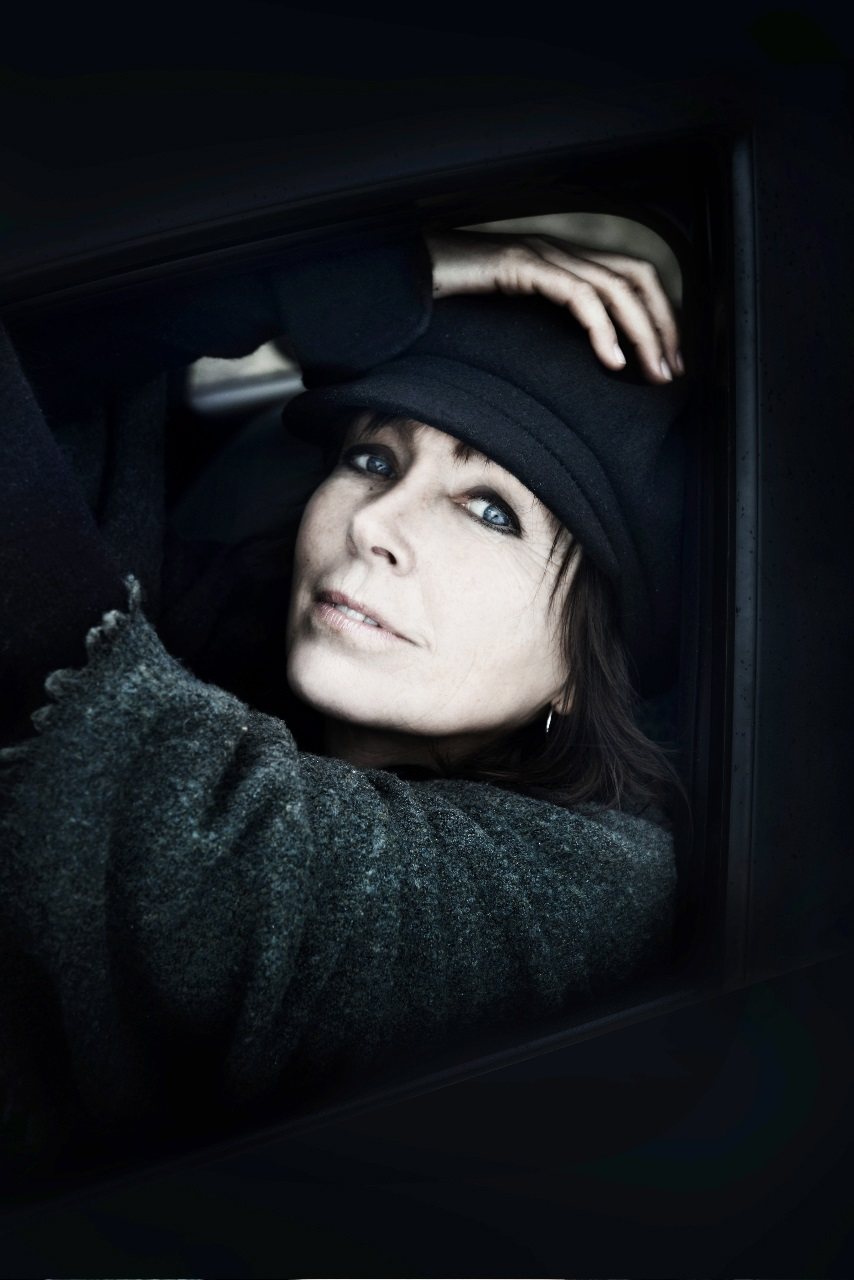

Background information
- Born: 13 November 1958 (age 67); Gothenburg, Sweden
- Origin: Norway
- Occupation: Singer-songwriter

Anita Skorgan (born 13 November 1958) is a Norwegian singer-songwriter. She represented Norway in the Eurovision Song Contest in 1977 (14th), 1979 (11th) and with Jan Teigen in 1982 (12th). She was also a backing singer at the 1981 and 1983 contests, and co-wrote the 1988 Norwegian Eurovision entry "For vår jord", which placed fifth.

== Personal life ==
Born in Gothenburg, Sweden, Skorgan was once married to Jahn Teigen, another successful Norwegian singer-songwriter; constantly in the tabloids, the two were considered the first superstar celebrity couple in Norway. Together they have a daughter.

== Career ==
She represented Norway in the Eurovision Song Contest a total of five times: twice as a solo artist, once with Jahn Teigen, once as his backing singer in 1983, and also as Finn Kalvik's backing singer in his 1981 performance. In 1977 in London she sang "Casanova", finishing 14th. She had a bit more Eurovision success in Jerusalem two years later, lifting her song "Oliver" to 11th place. Back in England, she returned to the Eurovision stage with her then-husband Jahn Teigen to perform "Adieu", which was voted to a 12th position in Harrogate. She and Jahn between them appeared at every single Eurovision Song Contest final from 1977 until 1983 except 1980, namely 6 times in 7 years.

As her music career expanded, the demand for Anita Skorgan grew also. Before she knew it, she landed multiple appearances on the hit television show "Melodi Grand Prix" seven times between 1976 and 1985. On 17 November 2001 she appeared with her old classmates on the popular Norwegian TV show "Den store klassefesten" (The Big Class Reunion).

Having previously co-written the 1979 and 1983 entries, Skorgan co-wrote Norway's entry at the Eurovision Song Contest in 1988. The song "For vår jord" (For our earth) performed by Karoline Krüger, would give Skorgan her best-ever Eurovision result as a performer or writer, finishing fifth in Dublin. She was also one of the writers of "You Used To Be Mine", which came fifth in Norway's Melodi Grand Prix 1999, the show which selected the country's entry to the 1999 Eurovision Song Contest in Jerusalem.

Additional instances of her filmographic life include appearances on Prima Veras saga om Olav den hellige in 1983 and Stjerner i sikte in 1997.

In 1995 she gave her voice for the singing parts of the Disney movie Pocahontas and its sequel; in 1997 she sang as Anastasia in Anastasia, and in 1998 she sang as Kayley in the movie Quest for Camelot.

In 2004 she founded the band Queen Bees.

In November 2010 she was interviewed and sang live on the Jeremy Vine Show on BBC Radio 2. In July 2011 she was again interviewed, twice, on the Jeremy Vine Show following the 2011 Norway attacks.

== Discography ==
(Peak positions in VG-lista Norwegian Albums or Singles Chart in parentheses)

=== Albums ===
- 1975: Til en venn
- 1976: Du er nær meg (#16)
- 1976: Tänk på mej
- 1977: Young Girl (#12)
- 1978: Anita Skorgan
- 1979: Ingen vei tilbake
- 1979: Krama dej
- 1980: De fineste
- 1981: Pastell (#21)
- 1983: Cheek to Cheek (with Jahn Teigen) (#1)
- 1985: Karma (#10)
- 1986: White Magic (#6)
- 1990: Basic
- 1994: Julenatt (#13)
- 2001: Gull
- 2008: Julenatt
- 2009: Hele veien - 47 utvalgte sanger (#4)
- 2011: På gyllen grunn (#25)
- 2013: La høsten være som den er (#5)

=== EPs ===
- 1973: Fire klassiske pianostykker
- 1973: Aufschwung op. 12 nr. 2

=== MC-Cassettes ===
- 1981: Anita Skorgans beste

=== Singles ===
- 1977: "Casanova"(#4)
- 1979: "Oliver" (#6)
- 1982: "Adieu" (with Jahn Teigen) (#3)
- 1983: "Friendly" (with Jahn Teigen) (#2)
- 2009: "I denne julenatt" (#19)

Awards and achievements
| Preceded by Anne-Karine Strøm with "Mata Hari" | Norway in the Eurovision Song Contest; 1977 | Succeeded by Jahn Teigen with "Mil etter mil" |
| Preceded by Jahn Teigen with "Mil etter mil" | Norway in the Eurovision Song Contest; 1979 | Succeeded by Sverre Kjelsberg & Mattis Hætta with "Sámiid Ædnan" |
| Preceded by Finn Kalvik with "Aldri i livet" | Norway in the Eurovision Song Contest; 1982 (with Jahn Teigen) | Succeeded by Jahn Teigen with "Do Re Mi" |
