= Bendik Singers =

Norwegian vocal group

The Bendik Singers were a four-member Norwegian vocal group, brought together by singer and composer Arne Bendiksen to participate in the Norwegian Eurovision Song Contest selection, Melodi Grand Prix, in 1973.

The group consisted of Anne-Karine Strøm, Ellen Nikolaysen and brothers Bjørn and Philip Kruse. They performed Bendiksen's song "Å for et spill" at the Melodi Grand Prix in Oslo on 17 February 1973, and were voted the winners, earning the Norwegian ticket to the 18th Eurovision Song Contest, held in Luxembourg City on 7 April. Before the contest the song was translated into English, with words and phrases also included from other European languages, and retitled "It's Just a Game". On the night of the contest, the song finished seventh of the 17 participating entries, Norway's first top 10 placing since 1966.

The following year, Strøm won Melodi Grand Prix as a solo artist with "The First Day of Love"; at the 1974 Eurovision she was provided with backing vocals by Anne Lise Gjøstøl and the Kruses, and the performance is sometimes credited to 'Anne-Karine Strøm featuring the Bendik Singers'. Nikolaysen represented Norway in the 1975 Eurovision, and Strøm made her third appearance in 1976, meaning that for four consecutive years at least one member of the 1973 group appeared at Eurovision.

Awards and achievements
Preceded by Grethe Kausland & Benny Borg with "Småting"	Norway in the Eurovision Song Contest; 1973	Succeeded by Anne-Karine Strøm with "The First Day of Love"
