= Anne-Karine Strøm =

Norwegian singer (born 1951)

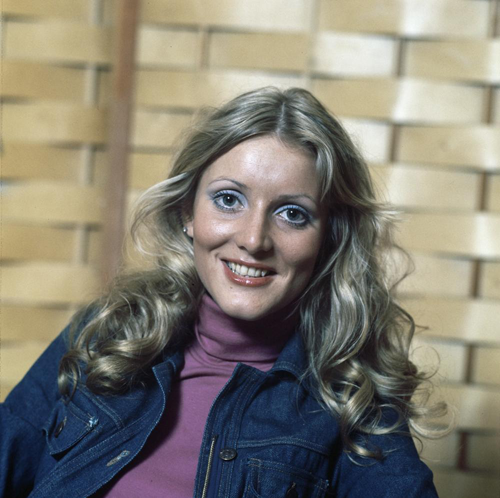
- Anne-Karine Strøm in 1976

Background information
- Born: 15 October 1951 (age 74)
- Origin: Oslo, Norway
- Genres: Pop, Schlager, Jazz
- Occupation: Singer

Anne-Karine Strøm (born 15 October 1951) is a Norwegian singer, best known for having taken part in the Norwegian Eurovision Song Contest selection, Melodi Grand Prix, in six consecutive years between 1971 and 1976, winning on three occasions (twice as a soloist and once as a member of an ensemble) and representing Norway in the Eurovision Song Contests of 1973, 1974 and 1976.

== Melodi Grand Prix ==
Strøm's Melodi Grand Prix appearances were as follows:

- 1971: "Hør litt på meg" – 10th
- 1972: "Håp" – 4th
- 1973: "Å for et spill" (as member of the Bendik Singers) – 1st
- 1974: "Hvor er du" – 1st
- 1975: "1+1=2" – 4th
- 1976: "Mata Hari" – 1st

== Eurovision Song Contest ==
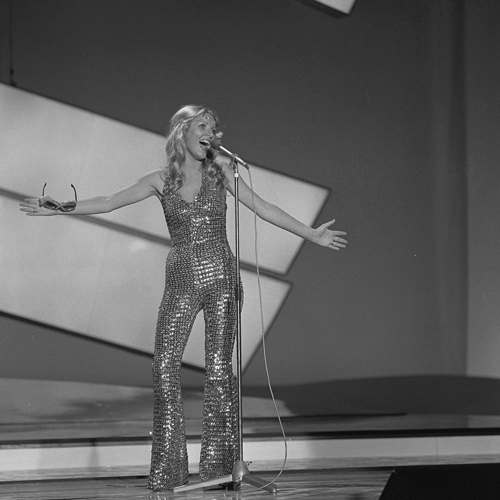
Anne-Karine Strøm at the Eurovision Song Contest 1976

The Bendik Singers' 1973 winning song was given English-language lyrics and retitled "It's Just A Game" for the 18th Eurovision Song Contest, which took place on 7 April in Luxembourg City, where it finished in seventh place of 17 entries.

Strøm travelled to Brighton, England for the 1974 contest, held on 6 April. Again, the song had been translated into English as "The First Day of Love", and backing vocals were provided by the other Bendik Singers. This was the notable contest which was won by ABBA and also featured several already internationally established names (Olivia Newton-John, Gigliola Cinquetti, Mouth & MacNeal). In this competitive field, "The First Day of Love" struggled to attract votes and ended as one of four songs sharing last place with just three votes each.

Strøm's final Eurovision appearance, at the 1976 contest in The Hague on 3 April, ended in complete failure, as "Mata Hari" placed last of the 18 participating songs. Prior to the contest "Mata Hari", a very modern and contemporary disco-style song, had been expected to do well, but it was suggested afterwards that Strøm's rather odd outfit and performance on the night may have cost votes. With two last-place finishes from three entries, Strøm is usually cited as the least successful artist to have appeared in more than one Eurovision Song Contest as the only artist to date finish in last place twice.

== Post-Eurovision ==
In the late 1970s Strøm began performing in musical cabarets with Øystein Sunde and her then husband Ole Paus. She released three albums between 1978 and 1986, which reflected a move towards a more serious style of music.

== Albums discography ==
- 1971: Drømmebilde
- 1975: Anne Karin
- 1978: Album
- 1982: Casablancas Døtre
- 1986: Landet utenfor

Awards and achievements
Preceded by Grethe Kausland & Benny Borg with "Småting"	Norway in the Eurovision Song Contest; 1973 (as member of Bendik Singers)	Succeeded by Anne-Karine Strøm with "The First Day of Love"
Preceded by Bendik Singers with "It's Just A Game"	Norway in the Eurovision Song Contest; 1974	Succeeded by Ellen Nikolaysen with "Touch My Life (With Summer)"
Preceded by Ellen Nikolaysen with "Touch My Life (With Summer)"	Norway in the Eurovision Song Contest; 1976	Succeeded by Anita Skorgan with "Casanova"
