= Arne Bendiksen =

- Norwegian singer, composer, and producer

Background information
- Born: Arne Joachim Bendiksen; 19 October 1926; Bergen, Norway
- Died: 26 March 2009 (aged 82)
- Occupations: Singer, composer, producer
- Years active: 1950s-2009
- Formerly of: The Monn Keys, Spiral

Arne Joachim Bendiksen (19 October 1926 – 26 March 2009) was a Norwegian singer, composer, and producer, described as "the father of pop music" in Norway. He represented Norway in the Eurovision Song Contest 1964.

== Career ==
Bendiksen was born in Bergen, Norway. In the 1950s, 1960s, and 1970s, he was a major figure in Norwegian popular music, first as a member of the group The Monn Keys, later as a soloist and composer for other artists. Besides writing his own songs, he also translated many foreign hits into Norwegian, making them Norwegian hits. Arne Bendiksen took part in the Norwegian Eurovision Song Contest selections several times, both as an artist and as a songwriter. He represented Norway in Eurovision once as a singer: in 1964 (Eurovision Song Contest 1964) with Spiral. Four times he took part as composer, most memorable as songwriter for Åse Kleveland's Intet er nytt under solen in 1966 (Eurovision Song Contest), finishing third.

Beginning in 1964, he was the boss of his own record company. Thanks to him, popular artists like Wenche Myhre and Kirsti Sparboe reached fame. However, in the Eurovision Song Contest finals of 1969, Norway received only 1 point for the song Oj, oj, oj, så glad jeg skal bli, which he had composed and was performed by Kirsti Sparboe.

Despite this setback, he continued his work as a singer/songwriter throughout the 1970s. In the 1980s, he entered the popular children's cassette industry and released his major children's work Barnefest i Andeby – Children's party in Duckburg – a cassette filled with catchy songs about the various Disney characters inhabiting the fictional city of Duckburg. This popular cassette got a sequel, released especially for the Christmas season, called Jul i Andeby – Christmas in Duckburg.

In June 2006, his all-new self-composed children's musical stage debuted in the small elementary school Fjellstrand Skole in Nesodden, Akershus.

Arne Bendiksen died on 26 March 2009, after having been sick for a short period of time. The cause of death was heart failure.

== Famous songs ==
- "Jeg vil ha en blå ballong"
- "Intet er nytt under solen"
- "Oj, oj, oj, så glad jeg skal bli"
- "Lykken er..."
- "Og han kvakk-, kvakk-, kvakk-, kvakk-, kvakker når han ser, pengene blir fler' og fler'!"
- "Knekke egg"
- "Det blir ikke regn i dag"

Awards and achievements
Preceded by Anita Thallaug with "Solhverv"	Norway in the Eurovision Song Contest; 1964	Succeeded by Kirsti Sparboe with "Karusell"
