= Benny Borg =

Swedish-born Norwegian singer and composer

- Born: 13 November 1945 (age 80); Gothenburg, Sweden
- Occupations: Singer and composer
- Spouse: Kirsti Sparboe (m. 1972–1978)
- Awards: Spellemannprisen (1973); Herman Wildenvey Poetry Award (2004)

Benny Borg (born 13 November 1945) is a Swedish-born Norwegian singer and composer.

He was born in Gothenburg, but moved to Norway in 1968, and was married to Norwegian singer and actress Kirsti Sparboe from 1972 to 1978. They had no children, but was stepfather to Kirsti’s daughter from a previous marriage, Christine. As a singer and musician, he is known for his collaboration with the Dizzie Tunes, and with Grethe Kausland. He won a Spellemannprisen award in 1973, and represented Norway in the Eurovision Song Contest 1972. In 2004 he won the Herman Wildenvey Poetry Award.

Awards and achievements
Preceded by Hanne Krogh with "Lykken er"	Norway in the Eurovision Song Contest; 1972 (together with Grethe Kausland, with the song "Småting")	Succeeded by Bendik Singers with "It's Just A Game"
