= Norway in the Eurovision Song Contest 2007 =

- Eurovision Song Contest 2007
- Participating broadcaster: Norsk rikskringkasting (NRK)
- Country: Norway
- Selection process: Melodi Grand Prix 2007
- Selection date: 10 February 2007

Competing entry
- Song: "Ven a bailar conmigo"
- Artist: Guri Schanke
- Songwriters: Thomas G:son

Placement
- Semi-final result: Failed to qualify (18th)

Participation chronology

Norway was represented at the Eurovision Song Contest 2007 with the song "Ven a bailar conmigo", written by Thomas G:son, and performed by Guri Schanke. The Norwegian participating broadcaster, Norsk rikskringkasting (NRK), organised the national final Melodi Grand Prix 2007 in order to select its entry for the contest. 18 entries competed in the national final that consisted of three semi-finals, a Last Chance round and a final. Eight entries ultimately qualified to compete in the final on 10 February 2007 where the winner was determined over two rounds of voting. In the first round of voting, a public televote exclusively selected the top four entries to advance to the competition's second round—the Gold Final. In the second round of voting, "Ven a bailar conmigo" performed by Guri Schanke was selected as the winner following the combination of votes from three regional jury groups and a public televote.

Norway competed in the semi-final of the Eurovision Song Contest which took place on 10 May 2007. Performing during the show in position 19, "Ven a bailar conmigo" was not announced among the top 10 entries of the semi-final and therefore did not qualify to compete in the final. This marked the first time that Norway failed to qualify to the final of the Eurovision Song Contest from a semi-final since the introduction of semi-finals in 2004. It was later revealed that Norway placed 18th out of the 28 participating countries in the semi-final with 48 points.

== Background ==
Prior to the 2007 contest, Norsk rikskringkasting (NRK) had participated in the Eurovision Song Contest representing Norway 45 times since its first entry in 1960. It had won the contest on two occasions: in 1985 with the song "La det swinge" performed by Bobbysocks!, and in 1995 with the song "Nocturne" performed by Secret Garden. It also had the two distinctions of having finished last in the Eurovision final more than any other country and for having the most nul points (zero points) in the contest, the latter being a record the nation shared together with Austria. It had finished last 10 times and had failed to score a point during four contests. Following the introduction of semi-finals in 2004, Norway has, to this point, finished in the top 10 once: in 2005 when "In My Dreams" performed by Wig Wam finished ninth.

As part of its duties as participating broadcaster, NRK organises the selection of its entry in the Eurovision Song Contest and broadcasts the event in the country. The broadcaster confirmed its intentions to participate at the 2007 contest on 26 June 2006. NRK has traditionally organised the national final Melodi Grand Prix to select its entry for the contest in all but one of its participation. Along with its participation confirmation, the broadcaster revealed details regarding its selection procedure and announced the organization of Melodi Grand Prix 2007 in order to select its 2007 entry.

== Before Eurovision ==
=== Melodi Grand Prix 2007 ===
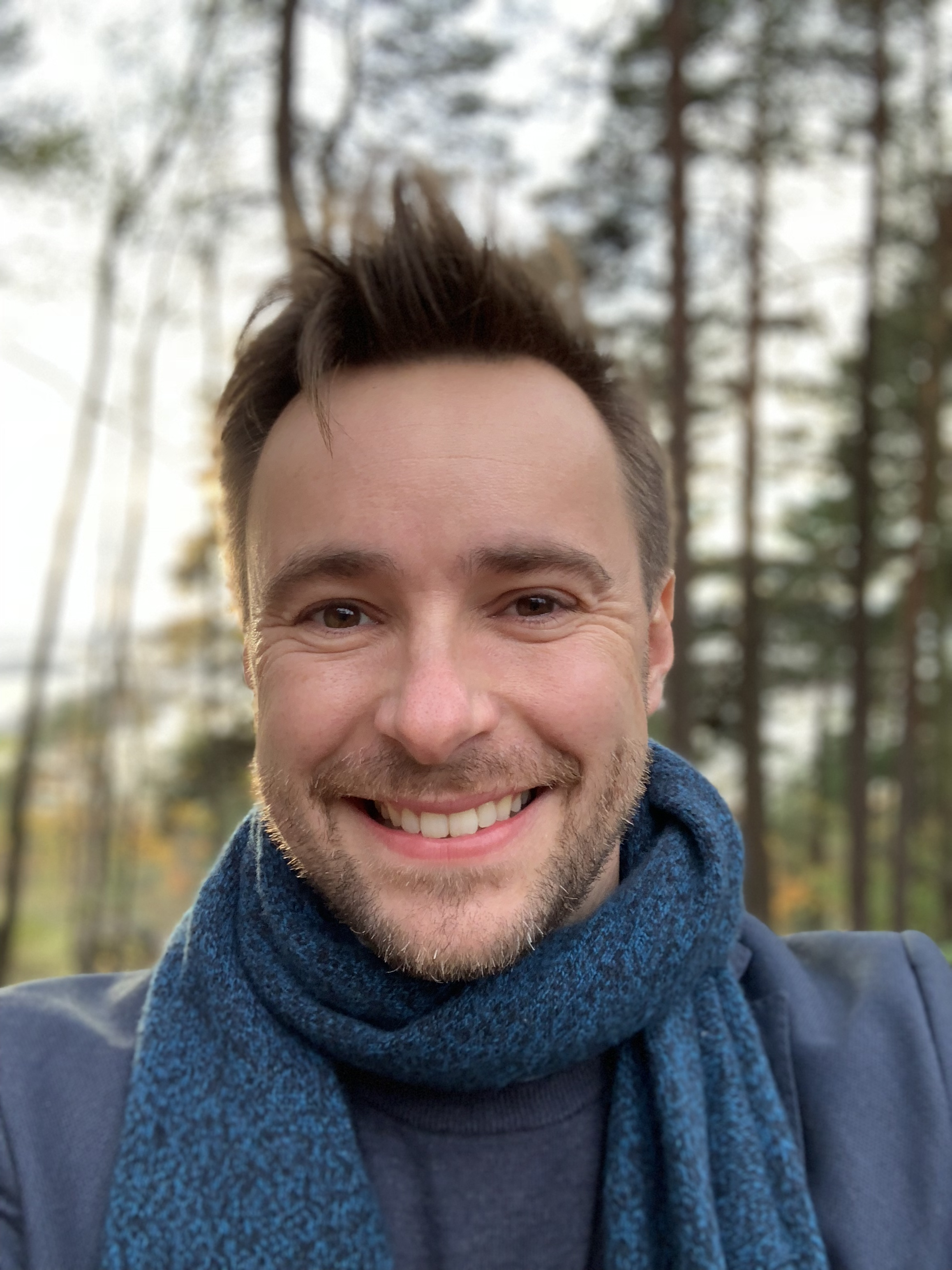
Stian Barsnes Simonsen (pictured in 2018) alongside Synnøve Svabø, were the two hosts of Melodi Grand Prix 2007.

Melodi Grand Prix 2007 was the 45th edition of the national final Melodi Grand Prix organised by NRK to select its entry for the Eurovision Song Contest 2007. 18 songs were selected to compete in a five-week-long process that commenced on 20 January 2007 and concluded with the final on 10 February 2007. All shows were hosted by Synnøve Svabø and Stian Barsnes Simonsen and televised on NRK1 as well as streamed online at NRK's official website nrk.no.

==== Format ====
The competition consisted of five shows: three semi-finals on 20 January 2007, 27 January 2007 and 3 February 2007, a Last Chance round (Sistesjansen) on 8 February 2007 and a final on 10 February 2007. Seven songs competed in each semi-final and the top two entries directly qualified to the final. The entries that placed third and fourth proceeded to the Last Chance round, and the bottom two were eliminated from the competition. An additional two entries qualified to the final from the Last Chance round. The results of the semi-finals and Last Chance round were determined exclusively by public televoting, while the results in the final were determined by jury voting and public televoting. Viewers could vote through telephone and SMS, and for the semi-finals, the public was able to cast their votes in advance during the NRK P1 radio programme Nitimen that was broadcast on the day before each show was held.

==== Competing entries ====
A submission period was opened by NRK between 26 June 2006 and 1 September 2006. Songwriters of any nationality were allowed to submit entries, while performers of the selected songs would be chosen by NRK in consultation with the songwriters. At the close of the deadline, 464 submissions were received, of which 262 came from Swedish songwriters and 143 came from Norwegian songwriters. 18 songs were selected for the competition, 14 from the public call for submissions and four from artists and composers directly invited to compete. The six acts and songs competing in each of the three semi-finals were revealed on 27 December 2006, 3 January 2007 and 9 January 2007, respectively.

Artist	Song	Songwriter(s)	Selection
Andreea	"I Wanna Be With You"	Maria Marcus	Invited by NRK
Amelia	"Unbelievable"	Svein Finneide, Ken Ingwersen, Daniel Pandher, Jens Thoresen, Tommy la Verdi, Halvor Holter	Public submission
Christina Undhjem	"Here"	Eirik Husabø	Public submission
Crash!	"Wannabe"	Trond "Teeny" Holter	Public submission
Blue Moon Band	"Goodbye to Yesterday"	Kjetil Røsnes, Kirsti Johansen	Public submission
Dusty Cowshit	"Chicken Rodeo"	Dusty Cowshit	Public submission
Guri Schanke	"Ven a bailar conmigo"	Thomas G:son	Invited by NRK
Hazen	"Better Than This"	Mikael Jensen, Eivind Skådal, Morten Hazen	Public submission
Jannicke Abrahamsen	"Rocket Ride"	Knut-Øyvind Hagen, Thomas G:son, Andreas Rickstrand	Public submission
Jenny Jensen	"Vil du ha svar?"	Mats Larsson, Åsa Karlsstrøm	Invited by NRK
Infinity	"Hooked on You"	Birgitte Moe, Rune Minde	Public submission
Malin Schavenius	"Under stjernene"	Thomas Thörnholm, Dan Attlerud, Kurre Westling, Micke Løvdalen	Public submission
Marianne Solberg	"Livets små stjerner"	Kirsti Carr	Public submission
Marika Lejon	"Perfect Sin"	Adam Kalvermark	Public submission
Monica Hjelle	"Creator"	Jan Eggum, Kaja Huuse	Public submission
Stian Joneid	"Are You Ready?"	Kim A. Hagen, Hans Petter Moen	Public submission
Torhild Sivertsen and the Funky Family	"Love on the Dancefloor"	Taiwo Karlsen, Kehinde Karlsen	Public submission
Trine Rein feat. Andreas Ljones	"Maybe"	Niclas Molinder, Joacim Persson, Pelle Ankarberg	Invited by NRK

==== Semi-finals ====
Six songs competed in each of the three semi-finals that took place on 20 January, 27 January and 3 February 2007. The first semi-final took place at the Finnmarkshallen in Alta, the second semi-final took place at the Bodø Spektrum in Bodø, and the third semi-final took place at the Brunstad Conference Center in Stokke. In each semi-final the top two directly qualified to the final, while the third and fourth placed songs proceeded to the Last Chance round.

Semi-final 1 – 20 January 2007
R/O	Artist	Song	Result
1	Torhild Sivertsen and the Funky Family	"Love on the Dancefloor"	Final
2	Blue Moon Band	"Goodbye to Yesterday"	Last Chance
3	Marika Lejon	"Perfect Sin"	—N/a
4	Marianne Solberg	"Livets små stjerner"	—N/a
5	Stian Joneid	"Are You Ready?"	Last Chance
6	Infinity	"Hooked on You"	Final

Semi-final 2 – 27 January 2007
R/O	Artist	Song	Result
1	Guri Schanke	"Ven a bailar conmigo"	Final
2	Hazen	"Better Than This"	Last Chance
3	Malin Schavenius	"Under stjernene"	Last Chance
4	Andreea	"I Wanna Be With You"	—N/a
5	Amelia	"Unbelievable"	—N/a
6	Dusty Cowshit	"Chicken Rodeo"	Final

Semi-final 3 – 3 February 2007
R/O	Artist	Song	Result
1	Jannicke Abrahamsen	"Rocket Ride"	Last Chance
2	Trine Rein feat. Andreas Ljones	"Maybe"	Last Chance
3	Monica Hjelle	"Creator"	—N/a
4	Crash!	"Wannabe"	Final
5	Christina Undhjem	"Here"	—N/a
6	Jenny Jensen	"Vil du ha svar?"	Final

==== Last Chance round ====
The Last Chance round took place on 8 February 2007 at the Oslo Spektrum in Oslo. The six entries that placed third and fourth in the preceding three semi-finals competed and the top two entries qualified to the final.

Last Chance – 8 February 2007
R/O	Artist	Song	Result
1	Blue Moon Band	"Goodbye to Yesterday"	—N/a
2	Stian Joneid	"Are You Ready?"	—N/a
3	Hazen	"Better Than This"	—N/a
4	Malin Schavenius	"Under stjernene"	—N/a
5	Trine Rein feat. Andreas Ljones	"Maybe"	Final
6	Jannicke Abrahamsen	"Rocket Ride"	Final

==== Final ====
Eight songs that qualified from the preceding three semi-finals and the Last Chance round competed during the final at the Oslo Spektrum in Oslo on 10 February 2007. The winner was selected over two rounds of voting. In the first round, public televoting selected the top four entries to proceed to the second round, the Gold Final. In the Gold Final, three regional juries from the three semi-final host cities each distributed points as follows: 2,000, 4,000, 6,000 and 10,000 points. The results of the public televote were then revealed by Norway's five regions and added to the jury scores, leading to the victory of "Ven a bailar conmigo" performed by Guri Schanke with 108,541 votes. In addition to the performances of the competing entries, the interval act featured Christine Guldbrandsen, who represented Norway in 2006, performing her entry "Alvedansen" as well as her new song "Dansekjolen".

Final – 10 February 2007
R/O	Artist	Song	Result
1	Infinity	"Hooked on You"	—N/a
2	Jenny Jensen	"Vil du ha svar?"	—N/a
3	Trine Rein feat. Andreas Ljones	"Maybe"	—N/a
4	Dusty Cowshit	"Chicken Rodeo"	Gold Final
5	Torhild Sivertsen and the Funky Family	"Love on the Dancefloor"	—N/a
6	Jannicke Abrahamsen	"Rocket Ride"	Gold Final
7	Crash!	"Wannabe"	Gold Final
8	Guri Schanke	"Ven a bailar conmigo"	Gold Final

Gold Final – 10 February 2007
R/O	Artist	Song	Jury	Televote	Total	Place
1	Dusty Cowshit	"Chicken Rodeo"	14,000	55,062	69,062	4
2	Jannicke Abrahamsen	"Rocket Ride"	14,000	64,433	78,443	2
3	Crash!	"Wannabe"	24,000	46,203	70,203	3
4	Guri Schanke	"Ven a bailar conmigo"	14,000	94,541	108,541	1

Detailed Regional Jury Votes
R/O	Song	Alta	Bodø	Stokke	Total
1	"Chicken Rodeo"	2,000	10,000	2,000	14,000
2	"Rocket Ride"	6,000	2,000	6,000	14,000
3	"Wannabe"	10,000	4,000	10,000	24,000
4	"Ven a bailar conmigo"	4,000	6,000	4,000	14,000
Spokespersons
Alta – Marit Hætta Øverli; Bodø – Jonas Ueland Kolstad; Stokke – Tove Lisbeth Vasvik

Detailed Regional Televoting Results
R/O	Song	East	South	North	Central	West	Total
1	"Chicken Rodeo"	30,508	11,761	2,923	4,473	5,397	55,062
2	"Rocket Ride"	32,902	13,179	3,869	6,604	7,879	64,433
3	"Wannabe"	24,684	8,634	2,478	4,489	5,918	46,203
4	"Ven a bailar conmigo"	50,867	12,021	6,225	11,829	13,599	94,541
Spokespersons
Eastern Norway – Jorun Vang; Southern Norway – Knut Knudsen Eigenland; Northern Norway – Nina Birgitte Einem; Central Norway – Tom Erik Sørensen; Western Norway – Øyver Bakke

==== Ratings ====
Viewing figures by show
Show	Date	Viewers	Ref.
Semi-final 1	20 January 2007	769,000	
Semi-final 2	27 January 2007	748,000	
Semi-final 3	3 February 2007	734,000	
Last Chance	8 February 2007	664,000	
Final	10 February 2007	986,000	

=== Promotion ===
Guri Schanke made several appearances across Europe to specifically promote "Ven a bailar conmigo" as the Norwegian Eurovision entry by performing the song during the sixth show of the Spanish Eurovision national final Misión Eurovisión 2007 on 17 February, and during the final of the Lithuanian Eurovision national final on 3 March.

== At Eurovision ==
According to Eurovision rules, all nations with the exceptions of the host country, the "Big Four" (France, Germany, Spain and the United Kingdom) and the ten highest placed finishers in the 2006 contest are required to qualify from the semi-final on 10 May 2007 in order to compete for the final on 12 May 2007. On 12 March 2007, an allocation draw was held which determined the running order for the semi-final and Norway was set to perform in position 19, following the entry from Macedonia and before the entry from Malta.

In Norway, the semi-final and the final were broadcast on NRK1 with commentary by Per Sundnes. The final was also broadcast via radio on NRK P1. NRK appointed Synnøve Svabø as its spokesperson to announce the Norwegian votes during the final.

=== Semi-final ===
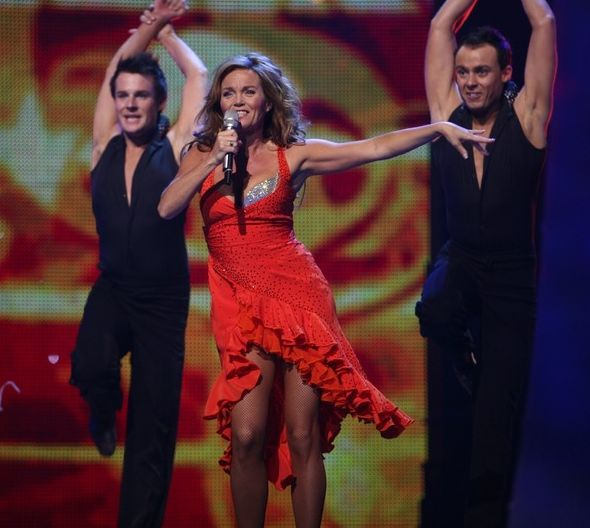
Guri Schanke during a rehearsal before the semi-final

Guri Schanke took part in technical rehearsals on 4 and 6 May, followed by dress rehearsals on 9 and 10 May. The Norwegian performance featured Guri Schanke performing a Latin-inspired routine on stage in a short brown dress together with two dancers and three backing vocalists. The colour of Schanke's dress, designed by Norwegian designer Carejanni Enderud and featured 25,000 Swarovski crystals, changed twice later on during the performance, first into orange and ultimately into gold. The performance concluded with Schanke being thrusted into the air on top of the dancers' arms. The LED screens displayed musical notes that changed colours throughout the song. The two dancers on stage with Guri Schanke were Asmund Grinaker and Bjørn Holthe, while the three backing vocalists were Åshild Kristin Stensrud, Jorunn Hauge and Karianne Kjærnes.

At the end of the show, Norway was not announced among the top 10 entries in the semi-final and therefore failed to qualify to compete in the final. This marked the first time that Norway failed to qualify to the final of the Eurovision Song Contest from a semi-final since the introduction of semi-finals in 2004. It was later revealed that Norway placed 18th in the semi-final, receiving a total of 48 points. The semi-final was watched by 706,000 viewers in Norway.

=== Voting ===
Below is a breakdown of points awarded to Norway and awarded by Norway in the semi-final and grand final of the contest. The nation awarded its 12 points to Iceland in the semi-final and to Sweden in the final of the contest.

==== Points awarded to Norway ====
Points awarded to Norway (Semi-final)
Score	Country
12 points	
10 points	
8 points	
7 points	Denmark; Iceland
6 points	Sweden
5 points	
4 points	Estonia; Spain
3 points	Andorra; Armenia; Netherlands
2 points	Malta; Montenegro; Poland; Portugal
1 point	Finland; Hungary; Moldova

==== Points awarded by Norway ====
Points awarded by Norway (Semi-final)
Score	Country
12 points	Iceland
10 points	Hungary
8 points	Serbia
7 points	Latvia
6 points	Turkey
5 points	Slovenia
4 points	Denmark
3 points	Belarus
2 points	Andorra
1 point	Netherlands

Points awarded by Norway (Final)
Score	Country
12 points	Sweden
10 points	Serbia
8 points	Hungary
7 points	Turkey
6 points	Bosnia and Herzegovina
5 points	Russia
4 points	Finland
3 points	Latvia
2 points	Ukraine
1 point	Moldova
