= Melodi Grand Prix 2007 =

Norwegian music competition

Dates and venues
- Semi-final 1: 20 January 2007; Finnmarkshallen, Alta
- Semi-final 2: 27 January 2007; Bodø Spektrum, Bodø
- Semi-final 3: 3 February 2007; Brunstad Conference Center, Stokke
- Second chance: 8 February 2007; Spektrum Arena, Oslo
- Final: 10 February 2007; Spektrum Arena, Oslo

Organisation
- Broadcaster: Norsk rikskringkasting (NRK)
- Presenters: Synnøve Svabø; Stian Barsnes Simonsen

Participants
- Number of entries: 18: 6 in each semi-final; 8 in the final (2 from each semi-final, 2 from the Second Chance round); 4 in the gold final

Vote
- Voting system: Jury and SMS and telephone voting Semi-finals; Televoting selects eight finalists over four semi-finals Final; Televoting selects four of the 8 finalists to progress to a "Gold Final"; 3 regional juries awarded the Gold finalists 2,000, 4,000, 6,000 and 10,000 points Televoting is conducted again, with each televote added to the songs' totals over five regions
- Winning song: "Ven a bailar conmigo" by Guri Schanke

Guri Schanke and dancers performing "Ven a bailar conmigo" at Melodi Grand Prix 2007

Melodi Grand Prix 2007 (shortened MGP 2007) is the television show organised by Norsk rikskringkasting (NRK) to select its entry for the Eurovision Song Contest 2007.

As with in 2006, there were three semifinals held before the final, where televoting decided the top four songs, the top two of which went to the final (in random order), and the songs who were placed 3rd and 4th went to the 'Second Chance' semifinal (also in random order).

On 12 October 2006, NRK announced that it had received 464 songs for the 2007 Melodi Grand Prix, over half of which came from Sweden. However, in the final selection of the 18 participating entries, only five were written partially or entirely by Swedish composers, less than half the number of the 13 Swedish entries in Melodi Grand Prix 2006. This was most probably the results of the heavy criticism NRK received from Norwegian composers due to the heavy Swedish dominance in MGP 2006.

Just like in MGP 2006, Synnøve Svabø and Stian Barsnes Simonsen hosted all five shows. However, 2006's additional side commentator, Jostein Pedersen, was swapped with trend guru and television host Per Sundnes, though Sundnes played a slightly smaller role than his predecessor, primarily being in charge of interval reports from the different host cities. However, he will substitute Jostein Pedersen as the new Norwegian Eurovision commentator for NRK in Helsinki.

== Schedule ==
Date	City	Venue	Notes
20 January 2007	Alta	Finnmarkshallen	Semi-final 1
27 January 2007	Bodø	Bodø Spektrum	Semi-final 2
3 February 2007	Stokke	Brunstad Conference Center	Semi-final 3
8 February 2007	Oslo	Oslo Spektrum	Second Chance
10 February 2007	Oslo	Oslo Spektrum	Final

== Semi-finals ==
=== Semi-final 1 ===
Semi-final 1 – 20 January 2007
R/O	Song	Artist	Songwriter(s)	Place
1	"Love on the Dancefloor"	Torhild Sivertsen and The Funky Family	Taiwo Karlsen, Kehinde Karlsen	Final
2	"Goodbye To Yesterday"	Blue Moon Band	Kjetil Røsnes, Kirsti Johansen	Siste Sjansen
3	"Perfect Sin"	Marika Lejon	Adam Kalvermark	—N/a
4	"Livets små stjerner"	Marianne Solberg	Kirsti Carr	—N/a
5	"Are You Ready?"	Stian Joneid	Kim A. Hagen, Hans Petter Moen	Siste Sjansen
6	"Hooked on You"	Infinity	Birgitte Moe, Rune Minde	Final

=== Semi-final 2 ===
Semi-final 2 – 27 January 2007
R/O	Song	Artist	Songwriter(s)	Place
1	"Ven a bailar conmigo"	Guri Schanke	Thomas G:son	Final
2	"Better Than This"	Hazen	Mikael Jensen, Eivind Skådal, Morten Hazen	Siste Sjansen
3	"Under stjernene"	Malin Schavenius	Thomas Thörnholm, Dan Attlerud, Kurre Westling, Micke Løvdalen	Siste Sjansen
4	"I Wanna Be With You"	Andreea	Maria Marcus	—N/a
5	"Unbelievable"	Amelia	Svein Finneide, Ken Ingwersen, Daniel Pandher, Jens Thoresen, Tommy la Verdi, Halvor Holter	—N/a
6	"Chicken Rodeo"	Dusty Cowshit	Dusty Cowshit	Final

=== Semi-final 3 ===
Semi-final 3 – 3 February 2007
R/O	Song	Artist	Songwriter(s)	Place
1	"Rocket Ride"	Jannicke Abrahamsen	Knut-Øyvind Hagen, Thomas G:son, Andreas Rickstrand	Siste Sjansen
2	"Maybe"	Trine Rein feat. Andreas Ljones	Niclas Molinder, Joachim Persson, Pelle Ankarberg	Siste Sjansen
3	"Creator"	Monica Hjelle	Jan Eggum, Kaja Huuse	—N/a
4	"Wannabe"	Crash!	Trond "Teeny" Holter	Final
5	"Here"	Christina Undhjem	Eirik Husabø	—N/a
6	"Vil du ha svar?"	Jenny Jensen	Mats Larsson, Åsa Karlsstrøm	Final

=== Siste Sjansen round ===
Siste Sjansen – 8 February 2007
R/O	Song	Artist	Songwriter(s)	Place
1	"Goodbye To Yesterday"	Blue Moon Band	Kjetil Røsnes, Kirsti Johansen	—N/a
2	"Are You Ready?"	Stian Joneid	Kim A. Hagen, Hans Petter Moen	—N/a
3	"Better Than This"	Hazen	Mikael Jensen, Eivind Skådal, Morten Hazen	—N/a
4	"Under stjernene"	Malin Schavenius	Thomas Thörnholm, Dan Attlerud, Kurre Westling, Micke Løvdalen	—N/a
5	"Maybe"	Trine Rein feat. Andreas Ljones	Niclas Molinder, Joachim Persson, Pelle Ankarberg	Final
6	"Rocket Ride"	Jannicke Abrahamsen	Knut-Øyvind Hagen, Thomas G:son, Andreas Rickstrand	Final

== Final ==
Final – 10 February 2007
R/O	Song	Artist	Songwriter(s)	Place
1	"Hooked on You"	Infinity	Birgitte Moe, Rune Minde	—N/a
2	"Vil du ha svar?"	Jenny Jensen	Mats Larsson, Åsa Karlsstrøm	—N/a
3	"Maybe"	Trine Rein featuring Andreas Ljones	Niclas Molinder, Joachim Persson, Pelle Ankarberg	—N/a
4	"Chicken Rodeo"	Dusty Cowshit	Dusty Cowshit	Gold Final
5	"Love on the Dancefloor"	Torhild Sivertsen & The Funky Family	Taiwo Karlsen, Kehinde Karlsen	—N/a
6	"Rocket Ride"	Jannicke Abrahamsen	Knut-Øyvind Hagen, Thomas G:son, Andreas Rickstrand	Gold Final
7	"Wannabe"	Crash!	Trond "Teeny" Holter	Gold Final
8	"Ven a bailar conmigo"	Guri Schanke	Thomas G:son	Gold Final

Gold Final
Song	Artist	Songwriter(s)	Jury	Televotes	Total	Place
"Chicken Rodeo"	Dusty Cowshit	Dusty Cowshit	14,000	55,062	69,062	4
"Rocket Ride"	Jannicke Abrahamsen	Knut-Øyvind Hagen, Thomas G:son, Andreas Rickstrand	14,000	64,443	78,443	2
"Wannabe"	Crash!	Trond "Teeny" Holter	24,000	46,203	70,203	3
"Ven a bailar conmigo"	Guri Schanke	Thomas G:son	14,000	94,541	108,541	1

=== Voting ===
Song	Juries				Televoting Regions					
Song	Alta	Bodø	Stokke	Total	Eastern Norway	Southern Norway	Northern Norway	Central Norway	Western Norway	Total
"Chicken Rodeo"	2,000	10,000	2,000	14,000	30,508	11,761	2,923	4,473	5,397	55,062
"Rocket Ride"	6,000	2,000	6,000	14,000	32,902	13,179	3,869	6,604	7,879	64,443
"Wannabe"	10,000	4,000	10,000	24,000	24,684	8,634	2,478	4,489	5,918	46,203
"Ven a bailar conmigo"	4,000	6,000	4,000	14,000	50,867	12,021	6,225	11,829	13,599	94,541

=== Spokespersons ===
- Alta: Marit Hætta Øverli
- Bodø: Jonas Ueland Kolstad
- Stokke: Tove Lisbeth Vasvik
- Eastern Norway: Jorun Vang
- Southern Norway: Knut Knudsen Eigenland
- Northern Norway: Nina Birgitte Einem
- Central Norway: Tom Erik Sørensen
- Western Norway: Øyver Bakke

== Past Grand Prix experience ==
- Trine Rein took part in the Melodi Grand Prix 2006 final, where also the two songwriters of "Are You Ready", Moen and Hagen, participated as artists. Unlike Trine, they reached the super final where they became the runners up behind Christine Guldbrandsen. Also present in the qualifying rounds the same year were Christina Undhjem and Jannicke Abrahamsen. Jannicke also reached the second chance round, where she failed to qualify for the final.
- Both Andreea and Marianne Solberg, the latter one as part of the five member group Blissed, took part in Melodi Grand Prix 2005, where both failed to reach the super final.
- Malin Schavenius finished joint last in Melodi Grand Prix 2004, without any points at all.
- Trond "Teeny" Holter, composer of Crash!'s "Wannabe", competed two years in a row as a guitarist in the glam rock band Wig Wam. In 2004, their "Crazy Things" finished third in that year's super final. In MGP 2005 they won the national final with a margin of more than 10,000 televotes. Their song "In My Dreams" finished on ninth place in the Eurovision Song Contest 2005 final after previously having qualified through the semi-final the same week.
- Jan Eggum, the composer of "Creator", took part as an artist in Melodi Grand Prix 1988 with the song "Deilige drøm" (Lovely Dream), where he finished tenth and last. Early rumours said that Mia Gundersen, a three time Melodi Grand Prix participant, would sing his song.
- Thomas G:son has written or co-written more than 30 national final entries for six different countries; Sweden, Norway, Finland, Spain, Latvia and Romania. Two of them, "Listen To Your Heartbeat" by Friends and "Invincible" by Carola, won the Swedish Melodifestivalen in respectively 2001 and 2006, and both went on to finish fifth in the Eurovision Song Contest 2001 and 2006. His most successful MGP entry so far was the drag duo Queentastic's "Absolutely Fabulous", which finished third in MGP 2006.
- Kirsti Carr, composer of "Livets små stjerner", took part in Melodi Grand Prix 2006 as an artist of the song "Misled", which reached the second chance round, but failed to gain enough televotes to reach the final from there.

== This Year's Melodi Grand Prix ==
- A total of 260,249 televotes were counted in the gold final, down with about 4,450 from the MGP gold final of 2006.
- After a rather unexciting vote announcement sequence, as Guri won with more than 30,000 televotes more than the runner up Jannicke, the 45-year-old famous musical artist and Dancing with the Stars participant Guri Schanke, was declared the winner of Melodi Grand Prix 2007. Though the punk-pop/rock group Crash! won the votes of the three juries by a landslide – composed as they all were by three younger and three older than 30 years – they were the least favourites among the televoters. Guri Schanke won four out of the five televoting regions, only missing out on the South of Norway by a couple of thousand votes. Guri received about 38% of the televotes in the gold final, a much higher percentage and total number of votes than Christine Guldbrandsen received the year before.
- Ven a bailar conmigo, as is the title of Guri's winning entry, is Spanish and means come with me to dance or simply come dance with me. The entry was specifically order by the Norwegian broadcaster NRK who wanted Guri Schanke to dance and sing an uptempo, fiery Latino song – due to Guri's second place in the Norwegian version of the popular TV series Dancing with the Stars – airing on the commercial TV station TV2 – where she learned to dance tango perfectly, amongst other dances. Even the songwriter Thomas G:son – Sweden's answer to Ralph Siegel concerning the record of Eurovision Song Contest and national final compositions – was personally contacted and invited by NRK. The leading Eurovision fan site, ESCToday.com, has already crowned Thomas G:son to be the new Eurovision king stealing the privilege from Ireland's triple winner Johnny Logan. Both Guri and Thomas thought NRK had a fantastic idea and decided to jump into it. Since then, NRK has promoted Guri and her song as the one to beat, even being announced a week before the other entrants in her semi final and giving her the last, and thus best, starting position in the big final.
- NRK video of Guri Schanke's winning performance of her latino entry Ven a bailar conmigo.
- Before the results of the gold final were announced, last year's winner Christine Guldbrandsen made a spectacular entrance into the stage of Oslo Spektrum, where she was descending from the sky looking like a real angel. She sang two of her own songs, one from her new album that was released commercially five days prior to the final, plus a remixed version of her own Eurovision entry Alvedansen.
- The after party for participants, hosts, previous MGP and Eurovision artists and other invited guests, was this year held at the new, and Norway's only, Hard Rock Café situated on Oslo's main street, the Karl Johan Street, the location of Norway's royal castle and parliament, plus Oslo's central train station and parts of its university. There, all the super finalists performed their songs once again, as well as Bobbysocks who sang their Eurovision winning entry La det swinge. Guri Schanke promised not to put her heals onto the roof as she said, but rather enjoy her victory in a more relaxed manner with just a glass of champagne or two.

== See also ==
- Eurovision Song Contest 2007

=== ESC history ===
- Norway in the Eurovision Song Contest 2007
- Norway in the Eurovision Song Contest

=== MGP history ===
- Melodi Grand Prix
