= History of Melodi Grand Prix =

Melodi Grand Prix, the Norwegian selection for the Eurovision Song Contest, began in 1960, the year of Norway's debut in the contest. It has been held almost every year since.

== Overview ==
=== Debut in 1960 ===
Norway first participated in the Eurovision Song Contest in 1960, and the first Melodi Grand Prix was therefore held that same year. Since then, MGP has been organized every year except 1970 (boycott in all Nordic countries), 1991 (internal selection) and 2002 (Norway had not qualified due to the poor result the year before).

Norway's first Eurovision participant, in 1960 in London, was Nora Brockstedt, receiving a fourth place for her evergreen "Voi Voi" in London. She also took part the following year with Sommer i Palma. Although this is 45 years ago, and Nora is well beyond 80, she still records music and releases albums, nowadays as a jazz artist, and now and then show up at concerts, including the spectacular Eurovision memorial gala concert during the annual pan-European gay pride event, the Europride 2005, held in Norway's capital Oslo.

The Norwegian Minister of Culture for the Labour Party from 1990 to 1996, Åse Kleveland, represented Norway in the contest during the 1960s. With her dark, very characteristic, sort of masculine voice, she performed her entry "Intet er nytt under solen" (Nothing New Under The Sun), achieving a third place for Norway. In 1986 she was the sole presenter of the Eurovision Song Contest 1986 held in the Grieg Hall in Norway's second city, Bergen.

=== Two victories ===
Norway has won the Eurovision Song Contest (ESC) three times. The first time was in 1985 in Gothenburg, Sweden, where the female duo Bobbysocks won the trophy achieving 123 points in total for the uptempo schlager tune "La det swinge" (Let it swing). Bobbysocks consists of Hanne Krogh and Elisabeth Andreassen - also known as Bettan - who had both experience from previous ESC finals. The young Hanne Krogh represented Norway already in 1971 with the sweet ballad "Lykken er" (Happiness is), while Bettan took part for Sweden in 1982 in the duo Chips. She also represented Norway in 1994 and 1996, ending up sixth and second with two ballads. Hanne Krogh returned to the Eurovision stage in 1991 being a quarter of the group Just 4 Fun. The two ladies reunited in 2005, first for the grand Eurovision memory concert during EuroPride 2005 in Oslo, then to perform at Eurovision's 50th anniversary show, Congratulations, in Copenhagen, Denmark.

==== The new age revolution ====
The second victory was brought to Norway by the Nordic-Celtic, mainly instrumental group Secret Garden. With the melody "Nocturne", composer Rolf Løvland and Irish violinist Fionnuala Sherry - together with the singer and the Swedish harpist - was awarded with 148 points. This was the very first time an entirely ethnic song won an ESC final, and started a massive wave of ethnic ESC entries until the 1998 contest - already the next year another Celtic melody won, Eimear Quinn's "The Voice". Petter Skavlan's scarce use of words in "Nocturne" - only 24 in the three-minute song altogether - created a great controversy in Norway's neighbouring country Sweden, of whose jury decided to boycott what they looked upon as an inappropriate entry for the so-called "schlager" contest, being one of only three juries not to give the winning composition any points at all (the two other were Austria and Croatia), while six juries awarded it the maximum 12 points.

==== World-wide fame ====
Secret Garden went on to become one of the most successful acts to have won the ESC, and is today a global performance, not only on their own, but also being the original group behind songs as "You Raise Me Up", which already has been recorded with different artists more than 125 times and which thanks to artists like Josh Groban and the Irish boyband Westlife is still listened to. Rolf Løvland was also the composer of Norway's other ESC winner, "La det swinge", as well as Norway's ESC entries in 1987 ("Mitt liv" by Kate Gulbrandsen) and 1994 ("Duett" by Bettan and Jan Werner Danielsen).

=== Expansion and success ===
Since the last couple of years of the 1990s, a major evolution has been going on within the MGP concept walls. Broadcaster NRK decided it was time to reflect the modern pop music to a higher degree. The national music industry was approached more intensively, in a desire to attract younger, more professional talents. All doubts aside, singing in English should be no drawback anymore, directing the obvious fact that a significant proportion of professional Norwegian artists sing in English these days. The next step implemented was making the event bigger, by moving the MGP final into the number one concert hall of Norway, the Oslo Spektrum, as a permanent location. The Spektrum has a capacity of 9,700, a "handful" more than the TV studios which had been used a few years earlier.

The increased efforts slowly lead to results, with successes in 1998 and 2000. However Norway also experienced its failures. In 2001, Haldor Lægreid came joint last, relegating Norway from the 2002 contest. After another success in 2003, with Jostein Hasselgård coming 4th with "I'm Not Afraid To Move On", Norway again finished last in the contest, with Knut Anders Sørum "High" receiving only 3 points in the 2004 contest, all from neighbours Sweden.

2005 saw another success for Norway. Glam-rock group Wig Wam took the victory in Melodi Grand Prix 2005. The winning song, "In My Dreams" enjoyed vast commercial success, and went to the top of the national single chart, staying at number one for three weeks and spending a total of 19 weeks on the chart.

=== New format and criticism ===
For the 2006 Melodi Grand Prix, NRK decided to change the format of the contest. After the success of Sweden in the contest and their national final Melodifestivalen, NRK decided to copy some aspects of the contest. Three semi-finals, each containing six songs, preceded the grand final of the contest in Oslo. The top 2 songs qualified directly to the final, while the third and fourth placed songs of each semi-final competed for two final spots in the final in a Siste Sjansen (Last chance) round, held before the final.

The first winner of the new format was Christine Guldbrandsen with "Alvedansen", performed in Norwegian. NRK received criticism due to their selection of songs, as 12 of the 18 competing songs were composed by Swedish songwriters. At Eurovision, Guldbransen came 14th in the final, failing to directly qualify Norway to the final of the 2007 contest.

Despite the criticism, NRK was determined to allow anyone to compete in Melodi Grand Prix. For the 2007 contest, 464 songs were submitted to NRK, with more than half of them coming from Sweden. The winner was Guri Schanke's "Ven a bailar conmigo", written by Swedish songwriter Thomas G:son. The song, however, failed to make an impact at Eurovision, coming 18th in the semi-final and failing to qualify to the final.

=== Norwegians only, and a third Eurovision victory ===
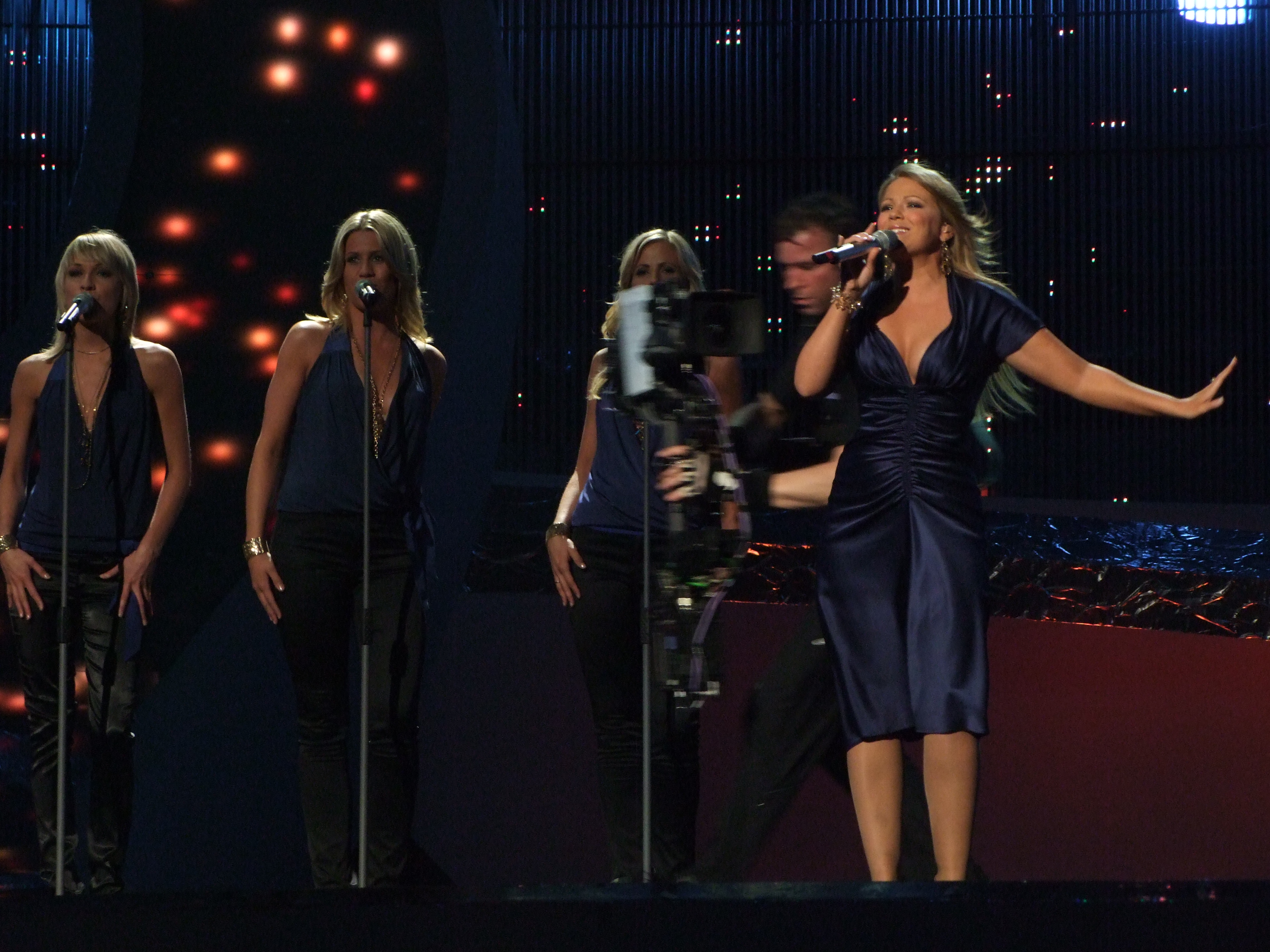
Maria Haukaas Storeng performing "Hold On Be Strong" at the first semi-final at Eurovision.

Confirming that Melodi Grand Prix would again be open to all, NRK opened the submission for entries. 600 submissions were received for MGP, however only 34% came from within Norway. Despite the small number of Norwegian-composed songs, the 2008 edition of Melodi Grand Prix was a Norwegian-only event. This selection again rose suspicions that a change in policy had been made by NRK, however this was denied.

The 2008 winner was Maria Haukaas Storeng with "Hold On Be Strong", composed by Mira Craig. The song went on to qualify to the final, where it came 5th with 182 points. This was Norway's first Top 5 finish since 2003, and was a success for Norway and for Norwegian songwriters. Due to this, NRK decided to close off Melodi Grand Prix to Norwegians only, making it a showcase of Norwegian writing talent.

The 2009 edition was the first to implement these new measures. A respectable figure of 350 songs was submitted to NRK, despite a loss of numbers, which was expected due to the new nationality rules. Although only 18 songs were once again planned to compete in the contest, NRK decided to increase this number to 21, due to the high quality of the entries received.

The winner of the contest was Alexander Rybak and "Fairytale". The song won with the biggest margin of votes seen in the contest's history, and was the first Melodi Grand Prix winner to reach number 1 in the Norwegian singles chart before winning. The song instantly became favourite to win at Eurovision, and has continuously been the favourite with bookmakers.

"Fairytale" went on to win Eurovision, becoming the largest winner in the history of the Eurovision Song Contest, receiving 387 points from all 41 voting countries. Rybak scored the biggest winning margin in Eurovision history, beating Iceland's Yohanna by 169 points, as well as receiving the most 12 points to be received by one country in one contest receiving 16. The song also went on to be a chart success around Eurovision, charting in the top 10 in 13 countries, including charting at number 1 in 4 countries.

After Norway's win in 2009, the 2010 contest was held in Oslo, Norway. The contest took place in the Telenor Arena on 25, 27 and 29 May 2010.

== Venues ==
=== Final ===
City	Venues (years)	Total
Oslo	NRK Television Centre (1960—1965, 1969, 1971—1972, 1974—1983, 1995—2000); Oslo Centralteatret (1966—1968); Chateau Neuf (1973, 1984—1985, 1987—1988, 1993); Hotel Royal Christiania (1990); Oslo Spektrum (1992, 1994, 2001, 2003—2019, 2025); H3 Arena (2021—2022)	56
Trondheim	Trondheim Spektrum (2020, 2023–2024)	3
Stavanger	Stavanger Forum (1986, 1989)	2
Lillehammer	Håkons Hall (2026)	1

=== Semifinals (since 2006) ===
City	Venues (years)	Total
Bodø	Bodø Spektrum (2006—2010)	5
Alta	Finnmarkshallen (2006—2007)	2
Kongsvinger	Kongsvinger Hall (2008—2009)	2
Skien	Skien Fritidspark (2009—2010)	2
Bergen	Framohallen (2006)	1
Stokke	Brunstad Conference Center (2007)	1
Stavanger	Sandvigå (2008)	1
Ålesund	Sunnmørshallen (2009 Second Chance)	1
Ørland	Ørland hovedflystasjon (2010)	1
Sarpsborg	Sparta Amfi (2010 Second Chance)	1

The Second Chance round was held in Oslo every year from 2006 to 2008. These are not included.

== See also ==
- Melodi Grand Prix winners
- Norway in the Eurovision Song Contest
- Norsk Rikskringkasting
