= Norway in the Eurovision Song Contest 2006 =

- Eurovision Song Contest 2006
- Participating broadcaster: Norsk rikskringkasting (NRK)
- Country: Norway
- Selection process: Melodi Grand Prix 2006
- Selection date: 4 February 2006

Competing entry
- Song: "Alvedansen"
- Artist: Christine Guldbrandsen
- Songwriters: Kjetil Fluge; Christine Guldbrandsen; Atle Halstensen

Placement
- Final result: 14th, 36 points

Participation chronology

Norway was represented at the Eurovision Song Contest 2006 with the song "Alvedansen", written by Kjetil Fluge, Christine Guldbrandsen, and Atle Halstensen, and performed by Guldbrandsen herself. The Norwegian participating broadcaster, Norsk rikskringkasting (NRK), organised the national final Melodi Grand Prix 2006 in order to select its entry for the contest. 18 entries competed in the national final that consisted of three semi-finals, a Last Chance round and a final. Eight entries ultimately qualified to compete in the final on 4 February 2006 where the winner was determined over two rounds of public televoting. The top four entries in the first round of voting advanced to the competition's second round—the Gold Final. In the second round of public televoting, "Alvedansen" performed by Christine Guldbrandsen was selected as the winner with 77,568 votes.

As one of the ten highest placed finishers in 2005, Norway automatically qualified to the finals of the 2006 contest. Norway performed in position 5 and placed fourteenth out of the 24 participating countries with 36 points.

== Background ==
Prior to the 2006 contest, Norsk rikskringkasting (NRK) had participated in the Eurovision Song Contest representing Norway 44 times since its first entry in 1960. It had won the contest on two occasions: in 1985 with the song "La det swinge" performed by Bobbysocks!, and in 1995 with the song "Nocturne" performed by Secret Garden. It also had the two distinctions of having finished last in the Eurovision final more than any other country and for having the most nul points (zero points) in the contest, the latter being a record the nation shared together with Austria. The country had finished last 10 times and had failed to score a point on four occasions. Following the introduction of semi-finals in 2004, Norway has, to this point, finished in the top 10 once: in 2005 when "In My Dreams" performed by Wig Wam finished ninth.

As part of its duties as participating broadcaster, NRK organises the selection of its entry in the Eurovision Song Contest and broadcasts the event in the country. The broadcaster confirmed its intentions to participate at the 2006 contest on 4 July 2005. NRK has traditionally organised the national final Melodi Grand Prix to select its entry for the contest in all but one of its participations. Along with its participation confirmation, the broadcaster revealed details regarding its selection procedure and announced the organization of Melodi Grand Prix 2006 in order to select its 2006 entry.

== Before Eurovision ==
=== Melodi Grand Prix 2006 ===
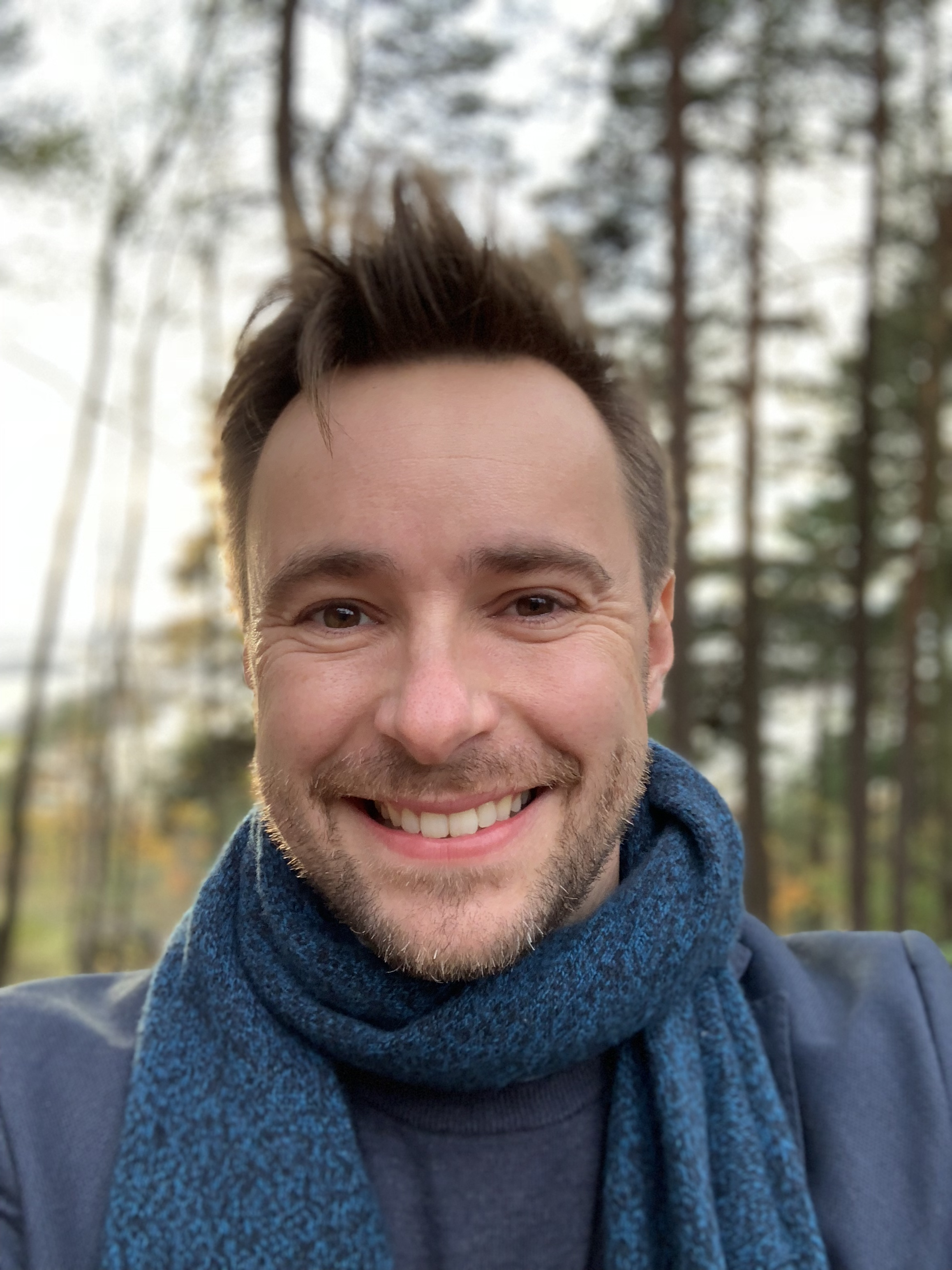
Stian Barsnes Simonsen (pictured in 2018) alongside Synnøve Svabø, were the two hosts of Melodi Grand Prix 2006.

Melodi Grand Prix 2006 was the 44th edition of the national final Melodi Grand Prix, organised by NRK to select its entry for the Eurovision Song Contest 2006. 18 songs were selected to compete in a five-week-long process that commenced on 13 January 2006 and concluded with the final on 4 February 2006. All shows were hosted by Synnøve Svabø and Stian Barsnes Simonsen and televised on NRK1 with commentary by Jostein Pedersen as well as streamed online at NRK's official website nrk.no.

==== Format ====
The competition consisted of five shows: three semi-finals on 13, 20 and 27 January 2006, a Last Chance round (Sistesjansen) on 3 February 2006 and a final on 4 February 2006. Seven songs competed in each semi-final and the top two entries directly qualified to the final. The entries that placed third and fourth proceeded to the Last Chance round, and the bottom two were eliminated from the competition. An additional two entries qualified to the final from the Last Chance round. The results of the all shows were determined exclusively by public televoting. Viewers could vote through telephone and SMS.

==== Competing entries ====
A submission period was opened by NRK between 4 July 2005 and 1 October 2005. Songwriters of any nationality were allowed to submit entries, however NRK reserved the right to choose the performers for the selected songs written by foreign songwriters. Songs longer than three minutes were also eligible to compete, however they could only last up to 3:20. At the close of the deadline, 586 submissions were received. 18 songs were selected for the competition and the six acts and songs competing in each of the three semi-finals were revealed on 20 December 2005, 27 December 2005 and 2 January 2006, respectively. Among the artists were past Eurovision entrants Tor Endresen who represented Norway in 1997, Hanne Haugsand who represented Norway in 2000 as part of the group Charmed, and Geir Rönning who represented Finland in 2005.

| Artist | Song | Songwriter(s) |
|---|---|---|
| Arlene Wilkes | "Sunshine" | Niclas Molinder, Joacim Persson, Pelle Ankarberg, Brian Hobbes |
| Birgitte Einarsen | "Saturday" | Nichas Molinder, Joacim Persson, Pelle Ankarberg, Brian Hobbes |
| Christina Undhjem | "My Dream" | Lars Halvor Jensen, Christina Undhjem |
| Christine Guldbrandsen | "Alvedansen" | Kjetil Fluge, Christine Guldbrandsen, Atle Halstensen |
| Hanne Haugsand | "Heaven's In Your Eyes" | Kristian Hermansen |
| Hans-Petter Moen and Kim Arne Hagen | "I Hear Music" | Hans-Petter Moen, Kim Arne Hagen |
| Jannicke Abrahamsen | "I Wanna Be" | Nichlas Molinder, Joachijm Persson, Pelle Ankarberg, Brian Hobbes, Stefan Berg |
| Jorun Erdal and Geir Rönning | "Lost and Found" | Claes Andreasson, Torbjörn Wassenius, Jonas Liberg |
| Kathrine Strugstad | "Paparazzi World" | Thomas Thörnholm, Danne Attlerud |
| Kirsti Carr | "Misled" | Snorre Rønning, Kirsti Carr |
| Marit Strømøy | "Too Much Love" | Niklas Andersson, Kristian Landgren, Thomas Lindberg |
| Mocci Ryen | "Tonight" | M. Nubar, Mocci Ryen |
| Ovi Martin | "The Better Side of Me" | Even Olsen |
| Phung | "Shut Up and Kiss Me" | Kee Marcello |
| Queentastic | "Absolutely Fabulous" | Thomas G:son, Andreas Rickstrand, Gerard James Borg |
| Tor Endresen | "Dreaming of a New Tomorrow" | Peter Bertilson, Frank Ådahl |
| Trine Rein | "Here for the Show" | Claes Andreasson, Torbjörn Wassenius, Jonas Liberg |
| Veronica Akselsen | "Like a Wind" | Stig Lindell, Kent Mattson, Eva-Lena Carlqvist |

==== Semi-finals ====
Six songs competed in each of the three semi-finals that took place on 13, 20 and 27 January 2006. The first semi-final took place at the Finnmarkshallen in Alta, the second semi-final took place at the Nordlandshallen in Bodø, and the third semi-final took place at the Framohallen in Bergen. In each semi-final the top two directly qualified to the final, while the third and fourth placed songs proceeded to the Last Chance round.

Semi-final 1 – 13 January 2006
| R/O | Artist | Song | Result |
|---|---|---|---|
| 1 | Trine Rein | "Here for the Show" | Final |
| 2 | Jorun Erdal and Geir Rönning | "Lost and Found" | Final |
| 3 | Kirsti Carr | "Misled" | Last Chance |
| 4 | Christina Undhjem | "My Dream" | —N/a |
| 5 | Mocci Ryen | "Tonight" | —N/a |
| 6 | Arlene Wilkes | "Sunshine" | Last Chance |

Semi-final 2 – 20 January 2006
| R/O | Artist | Song | Result |
|---|---|---|---|
| 1 | Queentastic | "Absolutely Fabulous" | Final |
| 2 | Hanne Haugsand | "Heaven's In Your Eyes" | —N/a |
| 3 | Ovi Martin | "The Better Side of Me" | Last Chance |
| 4 | Marit Strømøy | "Too Much Love" | —N/a |
| 5 | Hans-Petter Moen and Kim Arne Hagen | "I Hear Music" | Final |
| 6 | Jannicke Abrahamsen | "I Wanna Be" | Last Chance |

Semi-final 3 – 27 January 2006
| R/O | Artist | Song | Result |
|---|---|---|---|
| 1 | Birgitte Einarsen | "Saturday" | Last Chance |
| 2 | Veronica Akselsen | "Like a Wind" | Last Chance |
| 3 | Phung | "Shut Up and Kiss Me" | —N/a |
| 4 | Christine Guldbrandsen | "Alvedansen" | Final |
| 5 | Kathrine Strugstad | "Paparazzi World" | —N/a |
| 6 | Tor Endresen | "Dreaming of a New Tomorrow" | Final |

==== Last Chance round ====
The Last Chance round took place on 3 February 2006 at the Oslo Spektrum in Oslo. The six entries that placed third and fourth in the preceding three semi-finals competed and the top two entries qualified to the final.

Last Chance – 3 February 2006
| R/O | Artist | Song | Result |
|---|---|---|---|
| 1 | Kirsti Carr | "Misled" | —N/a |
| 2 | Arlene Wilkes | "Sunshine" | —N/a |
| 3 | Ovi Martin | "The Better Side of Me" | —N/a |
| 4 | Jannicke Abrahamsen | "I Wanna Be" | —N/a |
| 5 | Birgitte Einarsen | "Saturday" | Final |
| 6 | Veronica Akselsen | "Like a Wind" | Final |

==== Final ====
Eight songs that qualified from the preceding three semi-finals and the Last Chance round competed during the final at the Oslo Spektrum in Oslo on 4 February 2006. The winner was selected over two rounds of public televoting. In the first round, the top four entries were selected to proceed to the second round, the Gold Final. In the Gold Final, the results of the public televote were revealed by Norway's five regions and led to the victory of "Alvedansen" performed by Christine Guldbrandsen with 77,568 votes. In addition to the performances of the competing entries, the interval act featured the lead singer of Wig Wam (who represented Norway in 2005), Åge Sten Nielsen, performing his entry "In My Dreams".

Final – 4 February 2006
| R/O | Artist | Song | Result |
|---|---|---|---|
| 1 | Trine Rein | "Here for the Show" | —N/a |
| 2 | Hans-Petter Moen and Kim Arne Hagen | "I Hear Music" | Gold Final |
| 3 | Tor Endresen | "Dreaming of a New Tomorrow" | —N/a |
| 4 | Queentastic | "Absolutely Fabulous" | Gold Final |
| 5 | Birgitte Einarsen | "Saturday" | —N/a |
| 6 | Christine Guldbrandsen | "Alvedansen" | Gold Final |
| 7 | Veronica Akselsen | "Like a Wind" | —N/a |
| 8 | Jorun Erdal and Geir Rønning | "Lost and Found" | Gold Final |

Gold Final – 4 February 2006
| R/O | Artist | Song | Northern Norway | Central Norway | Southern Norway | Eastern Norway | Western Norway | Total | Place |
|---|---|---|---|---|---|---|---|---|---|
| 1 | Hans-Petter Moen and Kim Arne Hagen | "I Hear Music" | 5,816 | 9,253 | 10,548 | 31,520 | 10,086 | 67,223 | 2 |
| 2 | Queentastic | "Absolutely Fabulous" | 4,583 | 6,816 | 9,305 | 33,301 | 7,992 | 61,997 | 3 |
| 3 | Christine Guldbrandsen | "Alvedansen" | 5,119 | 8,341 | 9,522 | 29,713 | 24,873 | 77,568 | 1 |
| 4 | Jorun Erdal and Geir Rønning | "Lost and Found" | 3,872 | 13,137 | 7,102 | 24,191 | 9,603 | 57,905 | 4 |

==== Ratings ====
Viewing figures by show
| Show | Date | Viewers (in millions) | Ref. |
|---|---|---|---|
| Semi-final 1 | 13 January 2006 | 0.789 | |
| Semi-final 2 | 20 January 2006 | 0.787 | |
| Semi-final 3 | 27 January 2006 | 0.741 | |
| Last Chance | 3 February 2006 | 0.684 | |
| Final | 4 February 2006 | 1.264 | |

==== Criticism of foreign songwriters ====
Out of the 18 competing entries in Melodi Grand Prix 2006, only five featured Norwegian songwriters (two of them went on to place in the top two) with a majority of the remaining (12) being written by Swedish songwriters. This led to criticism from the local public and press in the days leading up to the competition. Melodi Grand Prix project manager Stian Malme stated that there were many songs written by Swedes because "they were simply among the better ones". Malme also stated that more than 60% of the submitted songs came from foreign songwriters and emphasised that all performers are Norwegian. On 3 March, NRK held a debate with Norwegian songwriters to raise their participation in future editions of Melodi Grand Prix.

=== Promotion ===
Christine Guldbrandsen specifically promoted "Alvedansen" as the Norwegian Eurovision entry on 15 March 2006 by performing the song during the Greek Eurovision national final Feel the Party.

== At Eurovision ==
According to Eurovision rules, all nations with the exceptions of the host country, the "Big Four" (France, Germany, Spain and the United Kingdom) and the ten highest placed finishers in the 2005 contest are required to qualify from the semi-final in order to compete for the final; the top ten countries from the semi-final progress to the final. As one of the ten highest placed finishers in the 2005 contest, Norway automatically qualified to compete in the final on 20 May 2006. On 21 March 2006, an allocation draw was held which determined the running order and Norway was set to perform in position 5, following the entry from Latvia and before the entry from Spain. Norway placed fourteenth in the final, scoring 36 points.

In Norway, the semi-final and the final were broadcast on NRK1 with commentary by Jostein Pedersen. The final was also broadcast via radio on NRK P1. NRK appointed Ingvild Helljesen as its spokesperson to announce the Norwegian votes during the final.

=== Voting ===
Below is a breakdown of points awarded to Norway and awarded by Norway in the semi-final and grand final of the contest. The nation awarded its 12 points to Bosnia and Herzegovina in the semi-final and to Finland in the final of the contest.

==== Points awarded to Norway ====
Points awarded to Norway (Final)
| Score | Country |
|---|---|
| 12 points | |
| 10 points | |
| 8 points | |
| 7 points | Russia |
| 6 points | Latvia |
| 5 points | Finland |
| 4 points | Iceland |
| 3 points | Moldova; Ukraine |
| 2 points | Greece; Sweden |
| 1 point | Armenia; Belarus; Denmark; Monaco |

==== Points awarded by Norway ====
Points awarded by Norway (Semi-final)
| Score | Country |
|---|---|
| 12 points | Bosnia and Herzegovina |
| 10 points | Sweden |
| 8 points | Finland |
| 7 points | Iceland |
| 6 points | Ireland |
| 5 points | Lithuania |
| 4 points | Russia |
| 3 points | Albania |
| 2 points | Poland |
| 1 point | Turkey |

Points awarded by Norway (Final)
| Score | Country |
|---|---|
| 12 points | Finland |
| 10 points | Sweden |
| 8 points | Bosnia and Herzegovina |
| 7 points | Ireland |
| 6 points | Denmark |
| 5 points | Lithuania |
| 4 points | Romania |
| 3 points | Russia |
| 2 points | United Kingdom |
| 1 point | Germany |
