= AEG =

The initials AEG are used for or may refer to:

== Common meanings ==
- AEG (German company), former German electrical manufacturer
- Anschutz Entertainment Group, an American entertainment company

== Other uses ==
- Thomas & Friends: All Engines Go, a 2021 animated TV series that serves as the reboot of the original Thomas & Friends series
- Automatic electric guns, a type of airsoft gun
- Alderac Entertainment Group, an American game publisher
- Association of Environmental & Engineering Geologists
- Arctic Equestrian Games, an annual horse show held in Norway
- AEG, the FAA LID for Double Eagle II Airport, Albuquerque, New Mexico, US
- AEG, the Aek Godang Airport, Padang Sidempuan, Indonesia (IATA airport code AEG)
- Annissa Essaibi George, an American Democratic Party politician
