= Ven a bailar conmigo =

2007 song by Guri Schanke

Single by Guri Schanke
- Language: English, Spanish
- Released: 2007
- Songwriter: Thomas G:son

Eurovision Song Contest 2007 entry
- Country: Norway
- Artist: Guri Schanke
- Languages: English, Spanish
- Composer: Thomas G:son
- Lyricist: Thomas G:son

Finals performance
- Semi-final result: 18th
- Semi-final points: 48
- Final result: DNQ
- Final points: DNQ

Entry chronology
- ◄ "Alvedansen" (2006)
- "Hold On Be Strong" (2008) ►

"Ven a bailar conmigo" (Spanish pronunciation: [ˈben a βajˈlaɾ komˈmiɣo]; English: "Come dance with me"; Norwegian: "Kom og dans med meg" [ˈkɔmː ɔ ˈdɑns mɛ ˌmæɪ]) is a song by Guri Schanke. It represented Norway in the Eurovision Song Contest 2007 after winning the Melodi Grand Prix 2007.

The song is a Latin-inspired number. Schanke sings about how much she loves to dance and urges her unnamed listener (in Spanish) to "come dance with [her]". BBC commentary during the contest explained that Schanke had participated in a reality-television show with a dancing theme, thus explaining the lyrics.

The song was written and composed by Thomas G:son, who also contributed the Spanish entry in the same contest, "I Love You Mi Vida". This represents one of a very small number of contests where the same writer has represented two countries at once.

== Melodi Grand Prix ==
Schanke won the Norwegian semi-final of Melodi Grand Prix 2007 (the Norwegian national selection) on 27 January, and "Ven a bailar conmigo" soon became a hit in gay bars in Oslo, to which her response was "Fantastic! I love it!". Schanke performed the song in the Norwegian national final (on 10 February 2007), in the English language; however, the title of the song is in Spanish and means 'come dance with me'. It scored shared second place by the judges, but was a runaway winner for viewers, receiving almost 95,000 televotes.

Schanke and dancers performing "Ven a bailar conmigo" at the Norwegian national final

The Norwegian entry's stage performance bore several similarities to that of "Tango! Tango!", another Latino song by Thomas G:son, performed by Petra Nielsen at the Swedish Melodifestivalen 2004:

- Both Petra Nielsen and Schanke are experienced performers of musical theatre.
- Both very short dresses were designed by drag artists. Nielsen's dress was designed by Lars-Åke Wilhelmsson (aka "Babsan") and Cårejonny Enderud, a former member of the Great Garlic Girls, was hired by NRK to design Schanke's costume for her Melodi Grand Prix performance.
- Both performances featured a woman dancing with two men dressed in black. Both women are lifted high up in the air at one point in the performance.

=== Performers ===
- Guri Schanke – vocals
- Christer Tornell – dancer
- Stefan Clarin – dancer

== Eurovision Song Contest ==
As Norway had not finished the previous contest in the top ten, the song was performed in the semi-final. Here, it was performed nineteenth, following Macedonia's Karolina with "Mojot svet" and preceding Malta's Olivia Lewis with "Vertigo". At the close of voting, it had received 48 points, placing 18th in a field of 28 and failing to qualify Norway for the final.

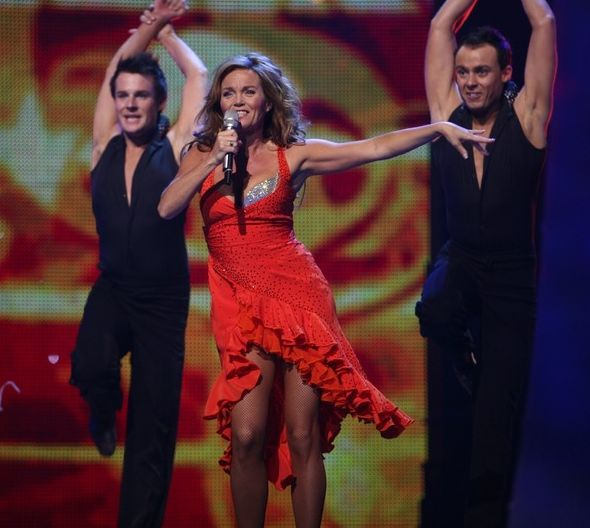
Schanke and dancers performing "Ven a bailar conmigo" at the Eurovision Song Contest

=== Performers ===
- Guri Schanke – vocals
- Bjørn Holthe – dancer
- Asmund Grinaker – dancer
- 3 backing singers (Karianne Kjærnes, Åshild Stensrud and Jorunn Hauge)

== Charts and responses ==
Schanke has not yet released a single, but the song entered as number 1 on the Norwegian radio program Norsktoppen (on air since 1973), a weekly ranking of national pop songs based on a jury and the listener's suggestions.

A music critic in the Swedish tabloid newspaper Expressen wrote that Schanke's performance "glow[ed] like a black hole", and that Norway's entry to Eurovision 2007 was among the worst contributions in that year's upcoming contest. He gave his only top score of that year's contestants to the Swedish The Ark with "The Worrying Kind".

== Remixes ==
A new electronic press kit from NRK contains four remixes. The main remix is made by Hallgeir Rustan (from the original Stargate production team), with extra guitar play by Jarl Ivar Andresen. Another mix is the "DeepFrost Mix" by the Norwegian DeepFrost team (Thomas J. Heyerdahl, Vegard Strand, Jan "Janski" Lindvaag and Rune Helmersen). A third mix, the "East Remix", is made by Andreas Rickstrand (G:son's co-composer "I Love You Mi Vida"). The press kit also contains the karaoke version.

== Covers ==
In late February 2007, it became known that "Ven a bailar conmigo" was to be recorded by Swedish artist Anna Book, for her album Samba Sambero, which was released on 14 March 2007. This was two months before Schanke was to perform the song at the Eurovision Song Contest in Helsinki. Anna Book was one of the contestants in Melodifestivalen 2007 with the song "Samba Sambero", also written by Thomas G:son. Schanke said, in a webchat with the Norwegian newspaper VG before it was known, that the song was specially written for her, and that it was written per request from NRK to Thomas G:son. Schanke's manager, Viggo Lund, said he was surprised to hear about the album release. NRK owns the rights for the songs that are part of Melodi Grand Prix, and the first right to use them. The EBU and NRK started investigations on the case. The Melodi Grand Prix project leader for NRK said in a statement to VG: "We have to look at this positively, and hope the song becomes popular in Sweden."

Finnish singer Kari Hirvonen released a Finnish version titled "Tuu kanssain tanssimaan" on 1 February 2022.

Preceded by "Alvedansen" by Christine Guldbrandsen	Melodi Grand Prix winners 2007	Succeeded by "Hold On Be Strong" by Maria Haukaas Storeng
