= Lejon =

Lejon is a Swedish language surname from the Swedish word for lion. Notable people with the name include:

- Britta Lejon (1964), Swedish politician
- Marika Lejon (1984), Norwegian composer and singer
