= MGP =

MGP may refer to:

== People ==
- Marie Gluesenkamp Perez (born 1988), member of the U.S. House of Representatives
- Morten Gamst Pedersen (born 1981), Norwegian football player for Blackburn Rovers F.C.

== Places ==
- Manga Airport (IATA airport code MGP), Manga, Papua New Guinea; see List of airports by IATA airport code: M
- Multnomah Greyhound Park, Wood Village, Oregon, USA; a former dog-racing track in greater Portland

== Music ==
- Music Genome Project, a music organization project based on mathematical algorithms

=== Melodi Grand Prix ===
- Melodi Grand Prix, the Norwegian Eurovision Song Contest selection
  - Melodi Grand Prix Junior, Norwegian Junior song contest that earlier selected the entry to representing Norway in the MGP Nordic, and before that JESC
- Dansk Melodi Grand Prix, the Danish Eurovision Song Contest selection
  - MGP Junior (Danish TV series), Danish Junior song contest that earlier selected the entry to representing Denmark in the MGP Nordic, and before that JESC
- MGP Nordic, the former Nordic version of Junior Eurovision Song Contest (JESC)

== Sports ==
- Mercedes Grand Prix, the FIA Formula 1 team owned by Dailmer/Mercedes-Benz
- MotoGP, the Formula 1 of motorcycle racing (Moto1), world championship racing series sanctioned by FIM

=== Sports events ===
- Malaysian Grand Prix, a Grand Prix for the Formula One automobile racing series held at the Sepang International Circuit]
- Manx Grand Prix, motorcycle races are held on the Isle of Man
- Motorcycle Grand Prix, a motorcycle race

== Science ==
- Mathematics Genealogy Project, a web-based database for an "academic genealogy" of mathematicians
- Matrix gla protein, a type of protein found in a number of body tissues in mammals, birds, and fish; and the MGP gene that encodes it
- Mouse Genetics Project, a mutant mouse production and phenotyping programme

== Groups, organizations ==
- Arirang Aviation Limited (ICAO airline code MGP; callsign: MAGPIE); see List of airlines of Bangladesh
- Maharashtrawadi Gomantak Party, a political party in Goa, India
- Marina de Guerra del Perú, the Spanish name of the Peruvian Navy
- Mark Goodson Productions, production company owned by Mark Goodson
- MGP Ingredients (Midwest Grain Products), or its subsidiary MGP of Indiana, a company that operates a distillery in Lawrenceburg, Indiana, USA

== Others ==
- Magar language (ISO 639 language code mgp), a Himalayan language
- MagicPoint, a software program for meeting presentations
- Manufactured Gas Plant, a facility for production of coal gas
- Merdeka Generation Package, a Singapore government package
- Moegirlpedia, a Chinese internet encyclopedia
- MG P-type, a 1930s British sports car from Morris Garages
- MGP submachine gun, a family of 9 mm submachine guns and semi-automatic pistols produced by the Peruvian Navy (Marina de Guerra del Perú)

== See also ==
- Melodi Grand Prix (disambiguation)
