= Melodi Grand Prix (disambiguation) =

Melodi Grand Prix is an annual music competition in Norway.

Melodi Grand Prix may also refer to:

- Dansk Melodi Grand Prix, an annual music competition in Denmark
- Melodi Grand Prix Junior, a Norwegian television music competition for children
- Melodi Grand Prix Junior (Denmark), a Danish song competition for children
- Melodi Grand Prix Nordic, a Scandinavian song contest for children, 2002–2009

== See also ==
- MGP (disambiguation)
- History of Melodi Grand Prix
