= Morten Rudå =

Norwegian actor

- Website: www.mortenruda.com

Morten Rudå (born 1 June 1960) is a Norwegian actor.

Rudå, who was one of those who started the drag show group Great Garlic Girls in 1981, has acted in theatre in both Norway and the US, as well as in Norwegian films and television productions. He is a graduate as an actor of the American Academy of Dramatic Arts in New York City (1995) and in theatre studies at Kunsthøgskolen i Oslo (1997).

He has acted at Nord-Trøndelag Teater, Trondheim Opera, Hedmark Teater, Nordland Teater, Riksteatret and Oslo Nye Teater.

== Filmography ==
- Adjø solidaritet (1985)
- Turnaround (1987)
- Fame Factory (2002)
- Pelle politibil (2002)
- Kvinnen i mitt liv (2003)
- Lies Inc. (2004)
- Seks som oss (1 episode, 2005)
- Jul i Tøyengata (2006)
- O' Horten (2007)
- 5 løgner (2007)
- Varg Veum – Kvinnen i kjøleskapet (2008)
- Mørke Sjeler (Dark Souls) (2011)

Behind Closed Curtains (Påfugl blant duer) 2017
