= Melodi Grand Prix 2006 =

Norwegian preselection for the Eurovision Song Contest 2006

Dates and venues
- Semi-final 1: 13 January 2006; Finnmarkshallen, Alta
- Semi-final 2: 20 January 2006; Nordlandshallen, Bodø
- Semi-final 3: 27 January 2006; Framohallen, Bergen
- Second chance: 3 February 2006; Oslo Spektrum, Oslo
- Final: 4 February 2006; Oslo Spektrum, Oslo

Organisation
- Broadcaster: Norsk rikskringkasting (NRK)
- Presenters: Synnøve Svabø and Stian Barsnes Simonsen

Vote
- Winning song: "Alvedansen"

Melodi Grand Prix 2006 (shortened MGP 2006) is the television show organised by Norsk rikskringkasting (NRK) to select its entry for the Eurovision Song Contest 2006.

The contest was held on February 4 in the Oslo Spektrum and was hosted by Synnøve Svabø and Stian Barsnes Simonsen. In addition, the Eurovision commentator for Norwegian television, Jostein Pedersen, played a role as side commentator for all five shows. In the three weeks leading up to the final, four qualification rounds were held; three semifinals and a second-chance round, where the last two final tickets were given out.

The winner was Christine Guldbrandsen with the song "Alvedansen".

== Swedish dominance ==
This year, NRK received 586 compositions, one of the highest numbers ever. However, the foreign songs exceed 60% of this total, coming mainly from Swedish composers. And as a result, 13 out of the 18 semi final entries are written by Swedes and two of them by Danes. However, the top two songs at MGP 2006 were written by Norwegians.

== A new concept ==
The three initial semi finals were held in three different Norwegian cities, based on the successful formula that has been used in the Swedish Melodifestivalen since 2002. That is to say, the semi-final concept in Norway is new of the year. NRK has decided that those cities which were awarded with the concept this year, will have the right to host one semi final each for the next three years.

== Semi-finals ==
=== Semi-final 1 ===
Semi-final 1: 13 January, 2006 - Finnmarkshallen, Alta
R/O	Song	Artist	Songwriter(s)	Place
1	"Here For The Show"	Trine Rein	Claes Andreasson, Torbjörn Wassenius, Jonas Liberg	Final
2	"Lost And Found"	Jorun Erdal & Geir Rönning	Claes Andreasson, Torbjörn Wassenius, Jonas Liberg	Final
3	"Misled"	Kirsti Carr	Snorre Rønning, Kirsti Carr	Siste Sjansen
4	"My Dream"	Christina Undhjem	Lars Halvor Jensen, Christina Undhjem	—N/a
5	"Tonight"	Mocci Ryen	M. Nubar, Mocci Ryen	—N/a
6	"Sunshine"	Arlene Wilkes	Nichlas Molinder, Joachijm Persson, Pelle Ankarberg, Brian Hobbes	Siste Sjansen

=== Semi-final 2 ===
Semi-final 2: 20 January, 2006 - Nordlandshallen, Bodø
R/O	Song	Artist	Songwriter(s)	Place
1	"Absolutely Fabulous"	Queentastic	Thomas G:son, Andreas Rickstrand, Gerard James Borg	Final
2	"Heaven's In Your Eyes"	Hanne Haugsand	Kristian Hermansen	—N/a
3	"The Better Side of Me"	Ovi Martin	Even Olsen	Siste Sjansen
4	"Too Much Love"	Marit Strømøy	N. Anderson, Kristian Landgren, Thomas Lindberg	—N/a
5	"I Hear Music"	Hans-Petter Moen & Kim Arne Hagen	Hans-Petter Moen, Kim Arne Hagen	Final
6	"I Wanna Be"	Jannicke Abrahamsen	Nichlas Molinder, Joachijm Persson, Pelle Ankarberg, Brian Hobbes, Stefan Berg	Siste Sjansen

=== Semi-final 3 ===
Semi-final 3: 27 January, 2006 - Framohallen, Bergen
R/O	Song	Artist	Songwriter(s)	Place
1	"Saturday"	Birgitte Einarsen	Nichlas Molinder, Joachijm Persson, Pelle Ankarberg, Brian Hobbes	Siste Sjansen
2	"Like A Wind"	Veronica Akselsen	Stig Llindell, Kent Mattson, Eva-Lena Carlqvist	Siste Sjansen
3	"Shut Up And Kiss Me"	Phung	K. Marcello	—N/a
4	"Alvedansen"	Christine Guldbrandsen	Kjetil Fluge, Atle Halstensen	Final
5	"Paparazzi World"	Kathrine Strugstad	Thomas Thörnholm, Dan Attlerud	—N/a
6	"Dreaming Of A New Tomorrow"	Tor Endresen	Peter Bertilson, Frank Ådahl	Final

=== Siste Sjansen round ===
Siste Sjansen: 3 February, 2006 - Spektrum, Oslo
R/O	Song	Artist	Songwriter(s)	Place
1	"Misled"	Kirsti Carr	Snorre Rønning, Kirsti Carr	—N/a
2	"Sunshine"	Arlene Wilkes	Nichlas Molinder, Joachijm Persson, Pelle Ankarberg, Brian Hobbes	—N/a
3	"The Better Side of Me"	Ovi Martin	Even Olsen	—N/a
4	"I Wanna Be"	Jannicke Abrahamsen	Nichlas Molinder, Joachijm Persson, Pelle Ankarberg, Brian Hobbes, Stefan Berg	—N/a
5	"Saturday"	Birgitte Einarsen	Nichlas Molinder, Joachijm Persson, Pelle Ankarberg, Brian Hobbes	Final
6	"Like A Wind"	Veronica Akselsen	Stig Llindell, Kent Mattson, Eva-Lena Carlqvist	Final

== Final ==
Final: 4 February, 2006 - Spektrum, Oslo
R/O	Song	Artist	Songwriter(s)	Place
1	"Here For The Show"	Trine Rein	Claes Andreasson, Torbjörn Wassenius, Jonas Liberg	—N/a
2	"I Hear Music"	Hans-Petter Moen & Kim Arne Hagen	Hans-Petter Moen, Kim Arne Hagen	Gold Final
3	"Dreaming of a New Tomorrow"	Tor Endresen	Peter Bertilson, Frank Ådahl	—N/a
4	"Absolutely Fabulous"	Queentastic	Thomas G:son, Andreas Rickstrand, Gerard James Borg	Gold Final
5	"Saturday"	Birgitte Einarsen	Nichlas Molinder, Joachijm Persson, Pelle Ankarberg, Brian Hobbes	—N/a
6	"Alvedansen"	Christine Guldbrandsen	Kjetil Fluge, Atle Halstensen	Gold Final
7	"Like a Wind"	Veronica Akselsen	Stig Llindell, Kent Mattson, Eva-Lena Carlqvist	—N/a
8	"Lost and Found"	Jorun Erdal & Geir Rönning	Claes Andreasson, Torbjörn Wassenius, Jonas Liberg	Gold Final

Gold Final
Song	Artist	Songwriter(s)	Televoting Regions					Total	Place
Song	Artist	Songwriter(s)	Northern Norway	Central Norway	Southern Norway	Eastern Norway	Western Norway	Total	Place
"I Hear Music"	Hans-Petter Moen & Kim Arne Hagen	Hans-Petter Moen, Kim Arne Hagen	5,816	9,253	10,548	31,520	10,086	67,223	2
"Absolutely Fabulous"	Queentastic	Thomas G:son, Andreas Rickstrand, Gerard James Borg	4,583	6,816	9,305	33,301	7,992	61,997	3
"Alvedansen"	Christine Guldbrandsen	Kjetil Fluge, Atle Halstensen	5,119	8,341	9,522	29,713	24,873	77,568	1
"Lost and Found"	Jorun Erdal & Geir Rönning	Claes Andreasson, Torbjörn Wassenius, Jonas Liberg	3,872	13,137	7,102	24,191	9,603	57,905	4

- A total of 264,693 televotes were counted in the super final.
- Both the top two songs in the super final were composed by Norwegians, despite NRK having only selected five songs with Norwegian composers out of the initial 18 semi final entries.

=== Spokespersons ===
- Northern Norway: Nina Birgitte Einem
- Central Norway: Kristin Haug
- Southern Norway: Knut Knudsen Eigenland
- Eastern Norway: Jonas Brønna
- Western Norway: Øyver Bakke
