= Dark Souls (film) =

2011 Norwegian horror film

- Directed by: César Ducasse, Mathieu Péteul
- Written by: César Ducasse, Mathieu Péteul
- Produced by: Maria Havig-Gjelseth, César Ducasse, Mathieu Péteul
- Starring: Morten Rudå, Kyrre Haugen Sydness, Ida Elise Broch, Johanna Gustavsson, Jan Hårstad, Karl Sundby, Henrik Scheele
- Cinematography: César Ducasse; Mathieu Peteul
- Edited by: César Ducasse; Mathieu Peteul
- Music by: Wojciech Golczewski
- Production company: Addict Films
- Distributed by: Addict Films
- Release date: 14 January 2011
- Running time: 95 minutes
- Country: Norway / France
- Language: Norwegian

Dark Souls (Norwegian: Mørke Sjeler) is a 2011 Norwegian horror film, written, directed, and co-edited by César Ducasse and Mathieu Péteul. It premiered in Norway on 14 January 2011.

== Plot ==
A young girl, Johanna (Johanna Gustavsson), is jogging alone in the woods when she is suddenly attacked and seemingly murdered by a mask-wearing maniac with a power drill.

Later that same day, her father Morten (Morten Rudå) receives a phone call from the police pronouncing her dead just as he sees her walk in the front door of their house. Morten tells the police that his daughter is completely fine and sitting in front of him. But strange things soon begin to happen to Johanna; she is disorientated and becomes pale and unresponsive. She is in a zombie-like state, not uttering a word and with difficulties walking and eating, but most noticeably she constantly vomits a strange black substance.

Johanna is admitted to the hospital where the doctors find a strange tumor in her head and surgery is needed right away, although the doctors can't guarantee she will survive the operation. But Morten refuses and takes his daughter home where he cares for her twenty four hours a day. Similar attacks begin to happen in the area and new victims are found by the police who have no leads in these bizarre cases, except the fact that most of the victims have been drilled in the head and end as walking dead, vomiting black bile.

Johanna's father takes it on himself to find out the truth. He embarks on a dark thrill ride of lost memories, conspiracy and zombie-like symptoms. Finding the mysterious darkness within is the source of the bizarre world he has uncovered.

== Cast ==
- Morten Rudå: Morten Ravn
- Johanna Gustavsson: Johanna Ravn
- Kyrre Haugen Sydness: Richard Askestad
- Ida Elise Broch: Maria
- Jan Hårstad: Dr. Hansen
- Karl Sundby: Offshore Diver
- Henrik Scheele: Chief of Police
- Marianne Rødje: Wendy
- Gustav-Adolf Hegh: Old man
- Kristian Holter: Driller

== Release ==
=== Home media ===
The film was released on DVD in the United States by Eagle One Media on June 17, 2014.

== Reception ==
Inger Merete Hobbelstad from Dagbladet stated that the film had a promising start, but stated that the film was ruined by an uneven execution which they called "almost ridiculously amateurish," and an illogical plot. Per Ivar Henriksbø from Gudbrandsdølen Dagningen gave the film a negative review, writing, "Dark Souls is unfortunately based on the fact that people act irrationally and act accordingly. Therefore, it becomes more annoying than exciting."
