= César Ducasse =

French film director, writer and editor

César Ducasse (born November 1, 1979) is a French film director, writer and editor, best known for directing the Norwegian cult horror Dark Souls (Mørke sjeler).

== Career ==
César Ducasse graduated from l’École Supérieure de Réalisation Audiovisuelle in 2001. He launched Addict Films, an independent production company developing music videos and feature films.

In 2001 he directed a music video for the Aphex Twin’s Milkman song, and a short film, Cryo, that won awards in short film festivals.

In 2004, he produced and directed the science-fiction film Lies Inc. Greatly influenced by American novelist Philip K. Dick, the film received a theater and DVD release in Nordic countries (Norway, Sweden, Denmark, Finland). The film is known to be the first Norwegian Sci-Fi.

In 2007 he directed a second music video, Petiatil CxHtdui, and started to work for Norwegian TV, editing popular shows like Asbjørn Brekke Show, Nissene over skog og hei, På tur med Dag Otto and Kompani Lauritzen.

His last feature film, Dark Souls (Mørke sjeler), a horror thriller, was released in Norwegian theaters in January 2011, and subsequently hit Blu-ray and DVD shelves shortly after. Dark Souls was in competition at the 29th Brussels International Fantastic Film Festival, and at the 44th edition of the Sitges Film Festival.

Dark Souls received mixed reviews in Norway upon theater release. However, it was sold to over 20 countries and received mainly positive reviews abroad.

== Awards ==
César Ducasse shared a best director award with Mathieu Peteul at the 2010 São Paulo Fantastico Festival for the film Dark Souls (Mørke sjeler). The film was also awarded in six other film festivals
