= Jan Hårstad =

Norwegian actor and political writer

- Born: 23 April 1943
- Occupation: Actor

Jan Edgar Hårstad (born 23 April 1943) is a Norwegian actor and political writer.

Hårstad played Johannes Rosmer in NRK Fjernsynsteatret's production of Rosmersholm in 1978. Later, he played "Blomster-Johan" in NRK's Christmas show Amalies jul from 1995.

He writes for publications including the Communist newspaper Friheten, and the website Document.no.

== Selected filmography ==
- The Witch Hunt (1981)
- Etter Rubicon (1987)
- Mørke Sjeler (Dark Souls) (2011)

== Awards ==
- 1983 – Per Aabels ærespris
- 1983 – Nationaltheatrets venners pris
