= Good Evening, Europe! =

2003 song by Birgitte Einarsen

Good Evening, Europe! is a national final song for the Eurovision Song Contest. It was performed by musical theatre singer Birgitte Einarsen in the Norwegian Melodi Grand Prix 2003, where it ended third, placing after Jostein Hasselgård and Alfie. Birgitte performed the song at a concert during EuroPride 2005 in Oslo.

The song is an uptempo disco tune. As the title indicates, Good Evening, Europe!, the song plays on the phrase used every year when the Eurovision hosts are addressing the millions of televiewers across Europe. The lyrics have plenty of references to the contest and lyrical parts are direct "steals" or copies of Eurovision song titles, and/or lyrics, plus songs performed by famous Eurovision participants like ABBA.

Good Evening, Europe! is composed by Arve Furset, who among other songs also penned Jostein Hasselgård's I'm Not Afraid To Move On which placed fourth at the Eurovision Song Contest 2003 in Latvia.

== Allusions ==
- Carola (Captured in a lovestorm)
- Charlotte Nilsson (Take me to your heaven)
- ABBA (The winner takes it all)
- Charmed (My Heart Goes Boom)
- Katrina & The Waves (Love Shine a Light)
- Olsen Brothers (Fly on the wings of love)
- Ruslana (Wild Dances; The Same Star)
