= Guri Schanke =

Norwegian actress and singer (born 1961)

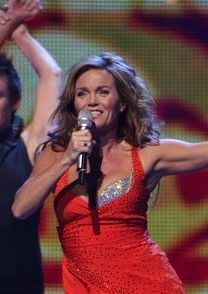
- Guri Schanke at the Eurovision Song Contest 2007

Background information
- Born: Guri Annika Schanke; 14 December 1961 (age 64)
- Origin: Oslo, Norway
- Genres: Melodic music, Pop
- Occupations: Actress, singer
- Instrument: Voice
- Years active: 1982–present
- Website: web.archive.org/web/20070212052334/http://www.kjentfolk.no/skuespillere/schanke/

Guri Annika Schanke (Norwegian pronunciation: [ˈɡʉ̂ːrɪ ˈskɑ̂ŋkə]; born 14 December 1961) is a Norwegian actress and singer. She is known in Norway for her acting career, and was part of the 2005 round of the Norwegian version of Dancing with the Stars, where she came in second.

== Career ==
Her debut as an actress came in 1982 on Oslo Nye Teater. Since then she has been part of a number of successful musicals, such as Les Misérables, Summer in Tyrol and Annie Get Your Gun. She has taken part in a number of TV show and productions, for example the Norwegian TV series Hotel Cæsar. She was married to comedian Øivind Blunck from 1991 to 2010.

Every year, between Christmas and New Year's Eve, the Norwegian TV channel NRK airs the televised musical theatre comedy The Spanish Fly (1990), also starring Guri Schanke and her then future to be husband, Øivind Blunck.

== Melodi Grand Prix ==
Guri won the 2007 Norsk Melodi Grand Prix with her song "Ven a bailar conmigo" written by Thomas G:son. Guri, won Norsk Melodi Grand Prix 2007 with 108 541 votes, which was 30 000 votes more than the song in 2nd place. Thanks to her win in Oslo in NMGP, Guri represented Norway in the 2007 Eurovision Song Contest

MGP 2007 Results:

1. Guri Schanke – Ven a bailar conmigo 108 541 votes
2. Jannicke Abrahamsen – Rocket ride 78 433 votes
3. Crash! – Wannabe 64 285 votes
4. Dusty Cowshit – Chicken rodeo 63 062 votes

== Eurovision Song Contest ==
Guri Schanke, representing Norway with "Ven a bailar conmigo", participated in the semi-final on 10 May 2007 in Helsinki, but failed to reach the top 10 for qualification into the final. She performed in the 19th position following Macedonia's Karolina Gočeva with "Mojot svet" and preceding Malta's Olivia Lewis with "Vertigo".

== Disney ==
Schanke has lent her voice to several Norwegian versions of Walt's animated features including:

- Pocahontas – as Pocahontas
- The Little Mermaid – as Ariel The Little Mermaid 2: Return to the Sea and The Little Mermaid 3: Ariel's Beginning
- 101 Dalmatians – as Perdita
- The Aristocats – as Duchess the white cat
- Oliver & Company
- Chip 'n Dale Rescue Rangers – Gadget Hackwrench

== See also ==
- Melodi Grand Prix 2007
- Eurovision Song Contest 2007

Awards and achievements
Preceded by Christine Guldbrandsen with "Alvedansen"	Norway in the Eurovision Song Contest; 2007	Succeeded by Maria Haukaas Storeng with "Hold On Be Strong"
