= Arctic Equestrian Games =

Annual horse show held in Norway

Arctic Equestrian Games (AEG) is an annual horse show held at Oslofjord Convention Center and arranged by Vestfold Horse Show AS, and is Norway's biggest horseshow. The first AEG was held in February 2006 at the Center in Stokke. AEG is limited for horseriders who are qualified as elite riders.

The current AEG president is Eirik Berentsen.

== Competitions ==
=== AEG 2006 ===
The AEG was first held in 2006 and featured concerts by Briskeby, Sandra Lyng Haugen and several other performers. The show was criticized for lacking transportation to the site and expensive food, but was praised for the service provided by the show's personnel.

=== AEG 2007 ===
The 2007 Games lasted eleven days, involving 250 riders and 550 horses.

== AEG Promotion Cup ==
Entry in the games occurs through qualifying in the AEG Promotion Cup, which is open to all Norwegian riding clubs.

== Venue ==
AEG is held at Oslofjord Convention Center.

== Program ==
For the first two years it was held, the AEG offered both horse riding, equestrian competitions and shows such as concerts and stand-up comedy.
