= Jorun Erdal =

Norwegian singer

- Born: Jorun Irene Erdal; 14 May 1963 (age 63); Oslo, Norway
- Occupations: Singer, musical theatre artist
- Website: www.jorunerdal.no

Jorun Irene Erdal (born 14 May 1963 in Oslo) is a Norwegian singer and musical theatre artist.

Erdal started her musical career touring Norway for three years with the band Ice. Later she was a backup vocalist for Hege Schøyen and Øivind Blunck.

In 1993/1994 under the name "Paparazzi Mama" she performed a dance-pop cover of the song "Mercedes Benz".

Since 1999 she has been involved with the Norwegian Eurovision Song Contest selections, the Melodi Grand Prix, participating as a judge in 1999, and competing in 2000, 2005, and 2006. In 2000 she came in fourth with Another You, and in 2005 her I Am Rock 'n' Roll came second. In Melodi Grand Prix 2006 she sang Lost and Found, a duet with Geir Rönning. The duo placed 4th.

== Discography ==
=== Singles ===
- 2006: "Lost and Found" (Jorun Erdal and Geir Rönning)
