= Great Garlic Girls =

Norwegian drag group

Great Garlic Girls is a Norwegian drag group that has performed a number of drag shows since 1981. It was started by Morten Rudå, Olav Klingen, and Simen Sand.

Up until 1992, the group consisted of Olav Klingen, Jonny Nymoen and Terje Schrøder. Olav Klingen had to quit the group in 1992, when he was involved in an accident which put a stop to his career.

Jonny Nymoen informed about his retirement from the stage due to problems with his hips in an interview with Se & Hør in April 2016.

Terje Schrøder is still active in the group, with Ronny Wilhelm as the replacement after Jonny Nymoen (2015) and Thomas Anholt as actor/dancer (since 2009). Former members include Kåre Jonny (Cårejonni) Enderud, Geir Lillejord and Dean Erik Andersen.

In 1986, they won the Melodi Grand Prix with the song "Romeo" together with Ketil Stokkan, and in the same year represented Norway in the international final of the Eurovision Song Contest in Grieg Hall in Bergen.

Simen Sand has since the beginning been the choreographer for the Great Garlic Girls. The group has toured Norway, Denmark, Sweden, West-Germany, the Faroes and Iceland, and has been part of TV-shows in Norway and Denmark. The group delivered Norway's Festival Rose d'Or contribution in 1987.

The Great Garlic Girls reached number one on the Italian charts in 2006, with the song "High Energy". High Energy was also the name of the group's show in 2003.

The group's management was earlier Taran Management, but today the group is represented by Nama Management.

== See also ==
- List of drag groups
- Queentastic - Dean Erik Andersen and Geir Lillejord
- Romeo (Ketil Stokkan song) - The Norwegian entry in the Eurovision Song Contest 1986 - the dancers were Olav Klingen and Jonny Nymoen
