= Geir Rönning =

Norwegian-Finnish singer-songwriter (born 1962)

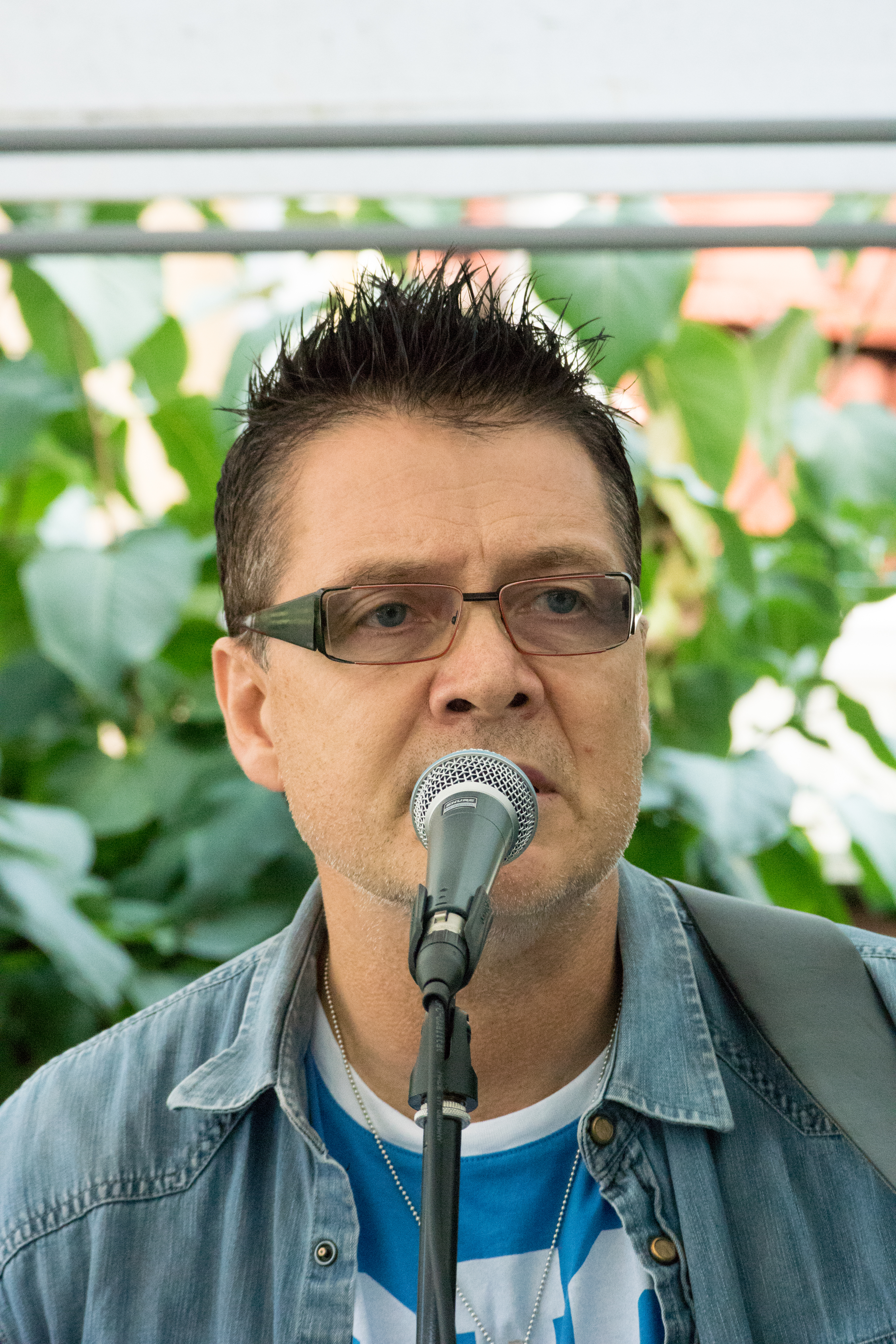
- Rönning in 2015

Background information
- Born: Geir Rønning; 5 November 1962 (age 63)
- Origin: Ålesund, Norway
- Genres: Pop, Soul
- Occupations: Singer, songwriter
- Instrument: Vocals
- Years active: 1994–present
- Website: web.archive.org/web/20051227112725/http://www.geirronning.com/

Geir Rönning (born 5 November 1962) is a Norwegian-Finnish professional singer-songwriter from Ålesund. He later moved to the capital Oslo in the 1980s, and later on to Stockholm, Sweden, where he found opportunity to start a musical career. He later moved to Finland, which he represented in the Eurovision Song Contest in 2005. He returned to Norway in 2006 to try unsuccessfully to represent Norway in Eurovision through a joint song with Jorun Erdal. In 2010, he had a comeback trying to represent this time Finland in Eurovision. The same year he also took part in the Swedish Idol 2010, coming seventh. Rönning has also performed multiple times together with well-known Swedish pianist Robert Wells and his international Rhapsody in Rock concept. Rönnings lives in Kauniainen, Finland.

== Musical career ==
=== Melodi Grand Prix (1994–1997) ===
In 1994 Geir's career as a composer started. That year he composed the song Gi alt vi har, which was performed by Jahn Teigen in Melodi Grand Prix 1994, the national selection for the Eurovision Song Contest. In the years 1994 till 1997, Geir wrote four composed four songs for and performed three songs in Melodi Grand Prix.

=== Moving to Finland ===
Around the time of the millennium change, Geir settled in Finland, where he became the lead singer of a five-member rock 'n' roll band, among them the guitarist of Leningrad Cowboys. Geir has also toured outside the Nordic countries; he's done gigs in Albania, Romania, England and the USA.

=== Finnish Euroviisut 2002, 2004 ===
In 2002 Geir returned to Eurovision spin-offs. This year he participated in the Finnish national final for the first time, with the ballad I Don't Wanna Throw It All Away, finishing third. He returned once again to the Finnish national final stage in 2004, this time finishing fifth with I Don't Need To Say.

=== Eurovision Song Contest 2005 ===
Finally it was three times lucky for Geir in 2005, when he won the entire Finnish Eurovision selection with the song "Why?", a ballad concerning the Beslan terror tragedy in Russia. That didn't matter much however, neither did the heavy televoting from Norway and Sweden. Geir ended just 18th with 50 points in the semi-final of the Eurovision Song Contest 2005, which that year was held in the Ukrainian capital Kyiv. He had to be among the top ten to advance to the final night.

=== Melodi Grand Prix 2006 ===
Despite his Eurovision participation in 2005, Geir wants to try again, this time representing his home country Norway. By being one of the two most popular acts (out of six) in the semi-final in Alta, northern Norway, Geir and his companion Jorun Erdal qualified directly to the final night of Melodi Grand Prix 2006, performing the ABBAesque schlager Lost And Found, written by three experienced Swedish composers. In the final in Norway's biggest concert hall, the Oslo Spektrum they ended 4th out of 8.

=== Finnish Euroviisut 2010 ===
Geir has also participated in the Eurovision Song Contest 2010 qualifiers in Finland.

=== Swedish Idol 2010 ===
In 2010, he reached the finals of Swedish Idol 2010. He was eliminated on 5 November, placing seventh.

== Discography ==
=== Albums ===
- 1996: Første gang
- 2005: Ready for the Ride
- 2008: Bare du som vet

=== Singles ===
- 2002: "I Don't Wanna Throw It All Away"
- 2004: "I Don't Need to Say"
- 2005: "Why?"
- 2006: "Lost and Found" (Jorun Erdal and Geir Rönning)

== See also ==
- Finland in the Eurovision Song Contest
- Eurovision Song Contest 2005
- Melodi Grand Prix 2006

Awards and achievements
Preceded by Jari Sillanpää with Takes 2 To Tango	Finland in the Eurovision Song Contest; 2005	Succeeded by Lordi with Hard Rock Hallelujah
