= Aek Godang Airport =

Aek Godang Airport Bandar Udara Aek Godang
- IATA: AEG; ICAO: WIME

Summary
- Airport type: Public
- Operator: Government
- Serves: Padang Sidempuan
- Location: North Padang Lawas Regency, North Sumatra, Indonesia
- Time zone: WIB (UTC+07:00)
- Elevation AMSL: 922 ft / 281 m
- Coordinates: 01°24′0.37″N 99°25′49.63″E
- Website: aeg.informasibandara.org

Map
- Location of the airport in Sumatra

Runways
Direction	Length		Surface
Direction	m	ft	Surface
11/29	1,396	4,580	Asphalt
- Source: DAFIF

Aek Godang Airport is located in North Padang Lawas Regency, North Sumatra, Indonesia.
