= Infinity (band) =

Norwegian band

- Origin: Oslo, Norway
- Genres: Eurodance
- Years active: 1997–present
- Members: Kjell Gabriel Henriksen; Birgitte Moe
- Past members: Egil Marius Storstein

Infinity is a Eurodance band from Norway that formed in the late 1990s. Its current members are Kjell Gabriel Hendrichs from Asker and Birgitte Moe from Bærum.

== History ==
Infinity was formed in 1995 as Barbie-Q, consisting of three rappers and a singer. Birgitte Moe (born in 1975) was working as cashier for a bakery at Sandvika Storsenter and Kjell Gabriel Hendrichs (born Kjell-Gabriel Eikli Henriksen in 1974) was working in a record store in the same shopping mall. They met in the bakery and started to talk. Birgitte had already been to audition for another Norwegian band Devotion and asked Kjell if she could sing for his band. After Birgitte joined the band, they changed their name to Infinity to avoid rights issues.

In 1998 Infinity consisted of Kjell Gabriel Henriksen, Birgitte Moe and Egil Marius Storstein (born 1969). Their first single “Happy” was released on 11 May 1998 and peaked at number two on VG-lista. It was followed by “Feeling Good” and “Makin’ Out”, both released later in 1998. Infinity released their first album, www.happy-people.net, on 25 January 1999 with a corresponding website (now offline). The single “This Time It’s For Real” (February 1999) was the last single to be released from their debut album and the first that did not chart. “Come on and Dance” (1999) was released as a promo single only. Egil Marius Storstein left the band in 2000, reducing the number of members to just two. Two singles, “Boys & Girls” (May 2000) and “1-2-3-4” (May 2001), of which neither charted followed. A new album called www.sporty-people.net were planned and a corresponding website was created. However, the album was never released and the recently released singles have yet to appear on an album.

During the spring 2001 Infinity switched record label to MTG. The promo singles “Naked in the Rain” and “Can You Hear” were released, shortly followed by the regular single “Sleeping My Day Away”, the band's first-ever cover. Their second album, Naked in the Rain was released on 19 October 2001. “Can You Hear” was re-released as a regular single in 2002 with the same track list, then called “Hear Me Out”. It peaked at number twelve on VG-lista and featured radio and extended versions of both “Can You Hear” and “Hear Me Out”. According to Infinity's now offline website “Can You Hear” is just another version of “Hear Me Out” and only the latter showed up on the album. In May 2003 Infinity recorded the track “Pink Panther” for a local “russebuss” with the same name. Yet another two promo singles, ”L.O.V.E.” and ”One More Chance (Na Na Na)”, were released later in 2003.

Infinity announced their comeback in 2007 and on Saturday, January 20, 2007, Infinity participated in the semi-final of the Norwegian national Eurovision Song Contest (Melodi Grand Prix) with the song "Hooked on You", winning one of two spots from the semi-final in Alta for the Norwegian final in February. They were not selected as Norway's entry in Eurovision Song Contest. In an interview with Budstikka prior to the national final Infinity told that they had planned a comeback for a long time and that there were still a lot of cool songs waiting to be released, but except for a re-release of their 1998 single Happy in 2010 they have not released any new material since Hooked on You. However, the band is still active and is currently participating in the We Love the 90's tour in Norway along with other 90's groups, including Reset. In 2009 www.happy-people.net was released digitally for its 10th anniversary, featuring six bonus tracks that were not present on the original release. It is still the best-selling dance album in Norway.

== Discography ==
=== Studio albums ===
Title	Details	Peak chart positions
Title	Details	NOR
www.happy-people.net	Release date: January 25, 1999; Label: EMI; Formats: CD	2
Naked in the Rain	Release date: October 21, 2001; Label: MTG; Formats: CD	—
"—" denotes releases that did not chart

=== Singles ===
Year	Single	Peak chart positions	Album
Year	Single	NOR	Album
1998	"Happy"	9	www.happy-people.net
1998	"Feeling Good"	10	www.happy-people.net
1998	"Makin’ Out"	15	www.happy-people.net
1999	"This Time It's For Real"	—	www.happy-people.net
2000	"Boys & Girls"	—	Singles only
2001	"1-2-3-4"	—	Singles only
2001	"Naked in the Rain"	—	Naked in the Rain
2001	"Sleepin' My Day Away"	—	Naked in the Rain
2002	"Hear Me Out"	12	Naked in the Rain
2003	"Pink Panther" (Ordered russ music)	—	Singles only
2007	"Hooked on You" *	—	Singles only
2010	"Happy 2010"	—	Singles only
2016	"Rainbow sky"	—	Singles only

* For their participation in Melodi Grand Prix 2007. A CD with all songs in this show was released, including Hooked on You. It also appeared on the compilation album “Hits For Kids 17”, which is part of a series of compilation albums featuring popular music (like Now That's What I Call Music!) mixed with more child-friendly music (such as Melodi Grand Prix Junior songs). However, Hooked on You was not released as an independent single.
