= Moegirlpedia =

Chinese internet encyclopedia

- Website logo in Chinese (top) and English (bottom)

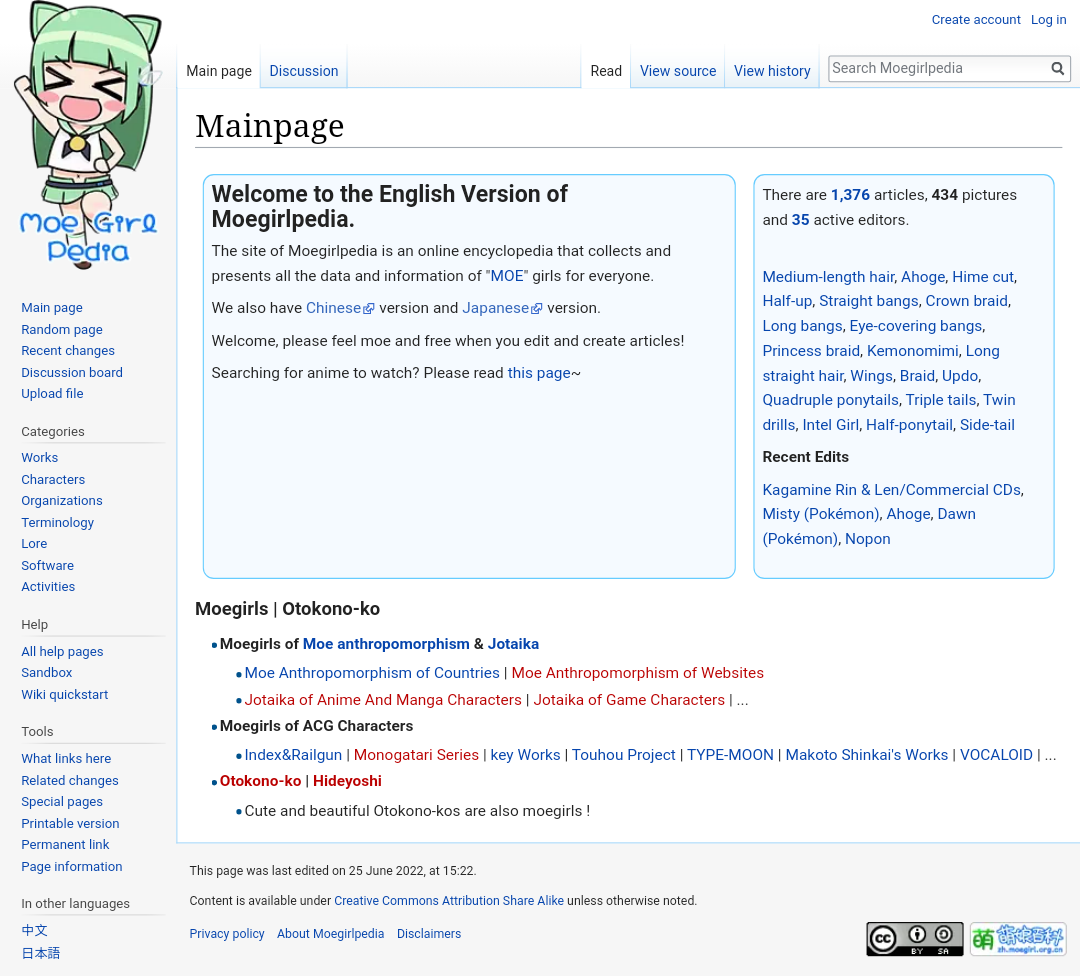
- Main page of the English Moegirlpedia
- Native name: 萌娘百科
- Website type: Online encyclopedia
- Available in: Chinese (primary), English, Japanese
- Owners: Hangzhou Mengpai Network Co., Ltd
- Founder: Baskice
- Website: zh.moegirl.org.cn (in Chinese); en.moegirl.org.cn (in English); ja.moegirl.org.cn (in Japanese); commons.moegirl.org.cn (Commons)
- Commercial: No
- Registration: No; registration required to edit
- Users: Users: 1,073,223 (As of 2 October 2024); Active users: 1,351 (As of 2 October 2024)
- Launched: October 11, 2010; 15 years ago
- Current status: active
- Content license: Chinese: CC BY-NC-SA 3.0 CN; English, Japanese: CC BY-SA 3.0

Moegirlpedia

Chinese name
- Chinese: 萌娘百科
- Literal meaning: Cute Girl Encyclopedia
Transcriptions
Standard Mandarin
- Hanyu Pinyin: Méngniáng Bǎikē
- Wade–Giles: Meng2-niang2 pai3-k`o1
Yue: Cantonese
- Yale Romanization: Màhngnèuhng Baakfō

Japanese name
- Japanese: 萌えっ娘百科事典

Moegirlpedia, (Note: Chinese: 萌娘百科; pinyin: Méngniáng Bǎikē; Japanese: 萌えっ娘百科事典; rōmaji: Moe-emusume hyakkajiten; lit. 'Cute Girl Encyclopedia') commonly shortened as Mengbai, (Note: Chinese: 萌百; pinyin: Méngbǎi) is a Chinese wiki encyclopedia launched in October 11, 2010, and features anime, comics, and video games, commonly abbreviated in China as ACG, and mainly contains female characters, moe anthropomorphism works, and Chinese authors' original works.

== History ==
Moegirlpedia was launched on October 11, 2010, initially named Green Dam Girl Wiki (Chinese: 绿坝娘wiki), later renamed Chinese Moegirl Pedia (Chinese: 中华萌娘小百科), and then simplified to Moegirlpedia on May 1, 2011.

By 2015, it reached more than 10,000 articles; in 2016, the number of articles in Moegirlpedia reached about 20,000; in 2019, the number of articles in Moegirlpedia reached about 40,000; by the beginning of 2020, Moegirlpedia had collected about 60,000 articles, with more than 1,400 active editors; and by August 2020, the number of articles has reached 70,000, with more than 2,000 active editors. At the same time, Moegirlpedia also opened accounts on major social media platforms, and by 2019, it has garnered 450,000 followers on Weibo.

On July 19, 2020, to restore Mainland Chinese access after the original moegirl.org domain was blacklisted by China's Ministry of IIT, Moegirlpedia moved its servers from the United States to Mainland China, where it is subject to censorship by the government of China.

During the twelfth anniversary of the site in 2022, Moegirlpedia shut down for repairs and resumed operations on October 31, with an announcement that it would be stepping up its censorship of sensitive content. On February 15, 2023, Moegirlpedia began placing advertisements on the site once again. On September 11, 2023, Moegirlpedia launched its ad-free membership. On March 29, 2024, Moegirlpedia launched its content review system, similar to Baidu Baike, where edited content is being reviewed before being fully visible.

== Content ==
The entire content of Moegirlpedia is written in a moe context, and it is a "public encyclopedia that anyone can edit freely", providing a platform for editing and publishing anime and other moe-themed works. There are three versions of Moegirlpedia: Chinese, English and Japanese. Moegirlpedia's Chinese text content is published under the Creative Commons Attribution-Noncommercial-Share Alike 3.0 China (BY-NC-SA 3.0 CN) license, allowing it to be modified and reused for non-commercial purposes as long as the original authors are attributed and the license is not substantially changed, while the English and Japanese text content is published under Creative Commons-Attribution-Share Alike 3.0 license.

Moegirlpedia defines as "an encyclopedia of everything can be moe", and mainly includes ACG characters, works, and terms with a preference for female characters, moe anthropomorphic works, and original works by Chinese-speaking authors as well as a large number of entries on second gen-related terms, including more than a hundred Moe stereotypes, and more than two hundred Moe points terms are classified into seven categories: body, appearance, mental, relationship, spiritual, behavior, and expressions. Most of the nearly a hundred Moe personalities included have more than five character entries as examples. The articles are not only illustrated, but also have strikethroughs and blacked-out text to increase the sense of humor, and also include some unencyclopedic comments.

Moegirlpedia articles appear in the form of "Moe", for example, the emoticon "_(:з"∠)_", which symbolizes lying on the floor and signifies a lack of motivation, has been anthropomorphized as "May Disease Emoticon Lady", a long-haired girl in a sundress. In the "Science" category, there are "Moe Confucius' Analects", "Moe Sun Zi's Art of War", and "The Cute Schrodinger's Cat", including "Moegirls" of the Periodic Table of the Elements, as well as "Moegirls" of China, Japan, and the United States. Chen Rui, the founder of Hangzhou Mengpai, the company that operates Moegirlpedia, said, "We are just using a new, more Moe-fied package to make it better understood and more in line with the young people's own preferences and aesthetics."

In the early days, Moegirlpedia only included female characters and girly characters, but later it also opened up to male characters and anime terms.

On April 8, 2014, when Microsoft announced that it was discontinuing maintenance of Windows XP, Moegirlpedia posted on its homepage, "XP-tan, thank you! And goodbye..." as a farewell to the operating system's anthropomorphized product, XP-tan. After the popularity of the illustrated character "Danxia" in the 2019 Hunan Education Publishing House high school geography textbook, Moegirlpedia included Danxia in just seven days, setting a record for the fastest inclusion.

== Controversies ==
=== Moecoin controversy ===
In early 2018, Baskice, the founder of Moegirlpedia, launched a virtual currency called "Moecoin" in Moegirlpedia, with Seikasha, International Otaku Expo Association (IOEA) and Silver Cross Society appearing on the list of partners in the white paper. On March 12, 2018, the CEOs of Seikasha, the International Otaku Expo Association, and SCS issued statements denying their involvement with Moecoin, by that time the project had already raised Moecoins with a total value of approximately CNY 2.55 million, while Moegirlpedia released an announcement on June 3 claiming that what had been exposed was a mirror site of the same name. On March 29, 2019, the project team announced that the Moecoins were currently in a state of stagnation, and therefore decided to start refunding the coins, by which time the value of the Moecoins on the account was less than CNY 300,000, currently in a state of stagnation, and thus decided to start refunding the coins from circulation.

=== Censorship ===
On October 12, 2022, Moegirlpedia's parent company, Hangzhou Mengpai Network Co. Ltd., was scrutinized by the public security authorities for content violating Cybersecurity Law of the People's Republic of China. On the next day, Moegirlpedia announced on Bilibili that the website was temporarily inaccessible due to technical reasons, and there were reports that it was related to the 20th National Congress of the Chinese Communist Party, and that it resumed operations on October 31, with restrictions on editing, and announced that it would follow the requirements of China's regulatory authorities to "strengthen the examination of political, pornographic, and violent content", and that more than 524 articles had been rectified and 194 non-compliant accounts have been removed. The removal includes Tokyo Ghoul, 1989 Tiananmen Square protests and massacre and enjo kōsai.

The editing restriction was lifted between November 18 and 26 and the blocked keyword database underwent several subsequent improvements. Historical reversions of entries that have not been reviewed are also not viewable. Around May 2023, Moegirlpedia imposed sitewide semi-protection, and new registered users were required to manually request permission from administrators to edit. The sitewide semi-protection was disabled since April 2024. On March 29, 2024, Moegirlpedia launched content review system to review all content except discussion boards for compliance, and the content submitted by editors is being reviewed before they are made public, and plans were made to remove sitewide semi-protection and blocked keyword database from the site.
