= Birgitte Einarsen =

Norwegian singer and musical theatre artist

Birgitte Einarsen is a Norwegian singer and musical theatre artist from Helgeroa in Larvik, Vestfold county. She was born in 1975. Birgitte has performed in popular musicals like Grease, Fame and The Little Shop of Horrors. She has also done the show My First, My Last, My Everything.

She became famous both in Norway and abroad in 2003, following her performance in that year's Melodi Grand Prix, which is used to select the Norwegian entry for the Eurovision Song Contest. Her entry was the uptempo disco song Good Evening, Europe!, which is the phrase used every year when the ESC hosts address millions of viewers across Europe. like the title, almost all of the lyrics were a reference to the Song Contest, usually direct quotes from past Eurovision entries, or from other songs sung by former Eurovision participants. The song was written by Arve Furset, who also composed the winning song by Jostein Hasselgård.

In 2006, Birgitte sang again, in Melodi Grand Prix 2006, performing another disco tune, Saturday. Her entry did not win direct entrance to the national final, but going through the Second Chance round, it did ultimately qualify. Singing in the grand final, she failed to make the top four.

== See also ==
- Melodi Grand Prix 2006
- Good Evening, Europe!
