= Jostein Pedersen =

Norwegian music journalist

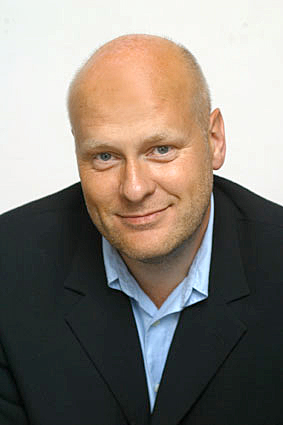
Jostein Pedersen.

Jostein Pedersen (born 11 August 1959 in Dønna) is a Norwegian musical journalist and reporter, television commentator and "music intelligencia". He was the Norwegian commentator to the Eurovision Song Contest in 1994, and from 1996 to 2006. Since then he has covered the Song Contest on VG's web TV channel. He lives in London, England.

== Career ==
=== Early career ===
Pedersen began his career in the music industry already in his late teens. He initially worked as a regular vendor at the local record shop, but slowly moved up in the system, eventually becoming a successful music journalist. From journalism, he advanced to become a disc jockey at local radio stations, before joining a new record company, Non Stop Music, where he sold records for new and more experienced artists, including popular rock icon Åge Aleksandersen and the woman who later became the best selling female artist of Norway, Sissel Kyrkjebø. Pedersen had first real breakthrough when Norway's only national radio broadcaster at that time, NRK, approached him about a new project which at that time was completely new in Norway; radioshows at night hours. Soon he was head-hunted once again and started working in one of Norwegian radio history's most popular radio programmes —Nitimen. He was the youngest member of the cast and he would later express that during these years he was in a constant state of happiness; it was a dream come true.

=== Eurovision commentator ===
After several years in radio he moved to television broadcasting in 1994, where he was responsible for the shows on TV during the Winter Olympics in Lillehammer during February 1994. Not long after the Olympics finished, Pedersen was hired as the new commentator for the Eurovision Song Contest, representing the Norwegian broadcaster, NRK, and it was for this role he would become famous in the following decade. While his British counterpart, radio legend Terry Wogan, was known to be biased against all the nations' entries, except the British ones, Pedersen became known for his "mean-spirited" comments on the Swedish entries and entrants, and kept up the long tradition of rivalry and sarcastic comments and jokes between Norway and Sweden. In 1995, he did not return to the contest, but he rejoined the following year, and ever since 1996, he has been a permanent ingredient in the popular, annual show, and has raised the level of entertainment several degrees since the old, bygone days.

Beside his juicy and sometimes controversial remarks, he is also known for his dark and masculine, yet pleasant and tranquilizing voice, which has aided his rise in popularity. In 2004 and 05, he also joined as side commentator in the Melodi Grand Prix, the Norwegian Eurovision nationals.

In 2006, NRK announced that it would not renew his contract for another year, and thus he would not be commenting the Eurovision. No reason for his departure was given, and it was announced that Per Sundnes would follow Pedersen as the new commentator. He would however not retire from the Contest completely, covering the finals live on his blog. In 2007, he joined national newspaper VG's new Eurovision broadcast, where he comments on the songs and artists, and he remains here today.

== Journalism ==
In addition to his work with TV and radio, Pedersen has published four books: three non-fiction and one novel called "Stort" (Great) (1996). It caused a sensation in Norway and was dubbed "the Norwegian American Psycho" as it described the sex, drugs and rock’n’roll lifestyle of the 80s. It became an instant cult classic as soon after publishing it went out of print owing to the publisher’s bankruptcy. In later interviews Pedersen has refused to comment on the book, despite the fact it is hailed as “a classic” and it figures in numerous dissertations. Currently it is a sought after item in second hand shops and antique dealers. His travelogue about English customs and ways of life called A Norwegian in London (En nordmann i London) (2005) was a success in his native Norway.

He has written extensively about pop, rock and classical music since the early ‘80s and is regarded as one of Norway’s leading authorities in either field. His website has an archive of more than 300 articles where there are also posted articles originally written for the gay and punk underground press. To the general public he is well known as a champion of Norwegian pop, rock and classical music both in radio, television and print.

In addition to his Eurovision work, Pedersen has produced and presented radio and TV profiles on both domestic and international celebrities. He also has produced documentaries on celebrities such as Wenche Myhre and Jahn Teigen of Norway, and international celebrities such as The Bee Gees.

Pedersen presented a weekly column London Calling for Norway’s most popular radio breakfast show Nitimen between 1997 and 2007. In the summers of 2007 and 2008 he was a runaway hit as the breakfast host in the NRK’s regional programs in the county of Nordland where he was born.

== See also ==
- Norway in the Eurovision Song Contest
- Melodi Grand Prix 2006
- Terry Wogan
- Eurovision Song Contest
