= Queentastic =

Norwegian drag queen group

Queentastic is a group of Norwegian drag artists, established in early 2005.

== Background ==
Members Dean Erik Andersen, born in 1971 in Kristiansand, and Geir Lillejord, born in Skien in 1968, both have previous drag experience from their membership in Great Garlic Girls - another Norwegian drag act (two members of which backed Ketil Stokkan's Eurovision Song Contest 1986 entry as dancers. In fact, Dean had previously substituted for Geir (a founder of the group), which marked the beginning of their association. The duo competed as one of 18 acts in the Norwegian selections for Eurovision Song Contest, the Melodi Grand Prix 2006. They had previously presented their weekly show Sex, Drag & Rock 'n' Roll together at the current premium queer nightclub in Norway - the Oslo-based Naken - in company with a third drag queen and designer Cårejånni Enderud. Enderud also designed the duo's costumes for their Melodi Grand Prix performances. The show also toured to Kristiansand and Bergen. Geir has also performed as part of the Ruth & Vigdis duo along with Enderud.

Queentastic's Melodi Grand Prix entry was the Alcazar-inspired disco song Absolutely Fabulous, inspired by the British comedy series with the same name. The song was written by Gerard James Borg and composed by Thomas G:son. The duo qualified to the super final round of MGP and finished third.

In 2007 Queentastic released a song for the Norwegian pride called Drop-Dead Gorgeous also penned by Gerard James Borg and composed by Thomas G:son.

== See also ==
- List of drag groups
- Melodi Grand Prix 2006
- Eurovision Song Contest 2006
- Absolutely Fabulous (BBC series)

Scandinavian drag artists

- After Dark (Sweden)
- Babsan (Sweden)
- DQ (Denmark)
- Rickard Engfors (Sweden)
- The Pink Lady´s (Norway)
- Skrellex (Norway)
