= Marika Lejon =

Norwegian composer and singer (born 1984)

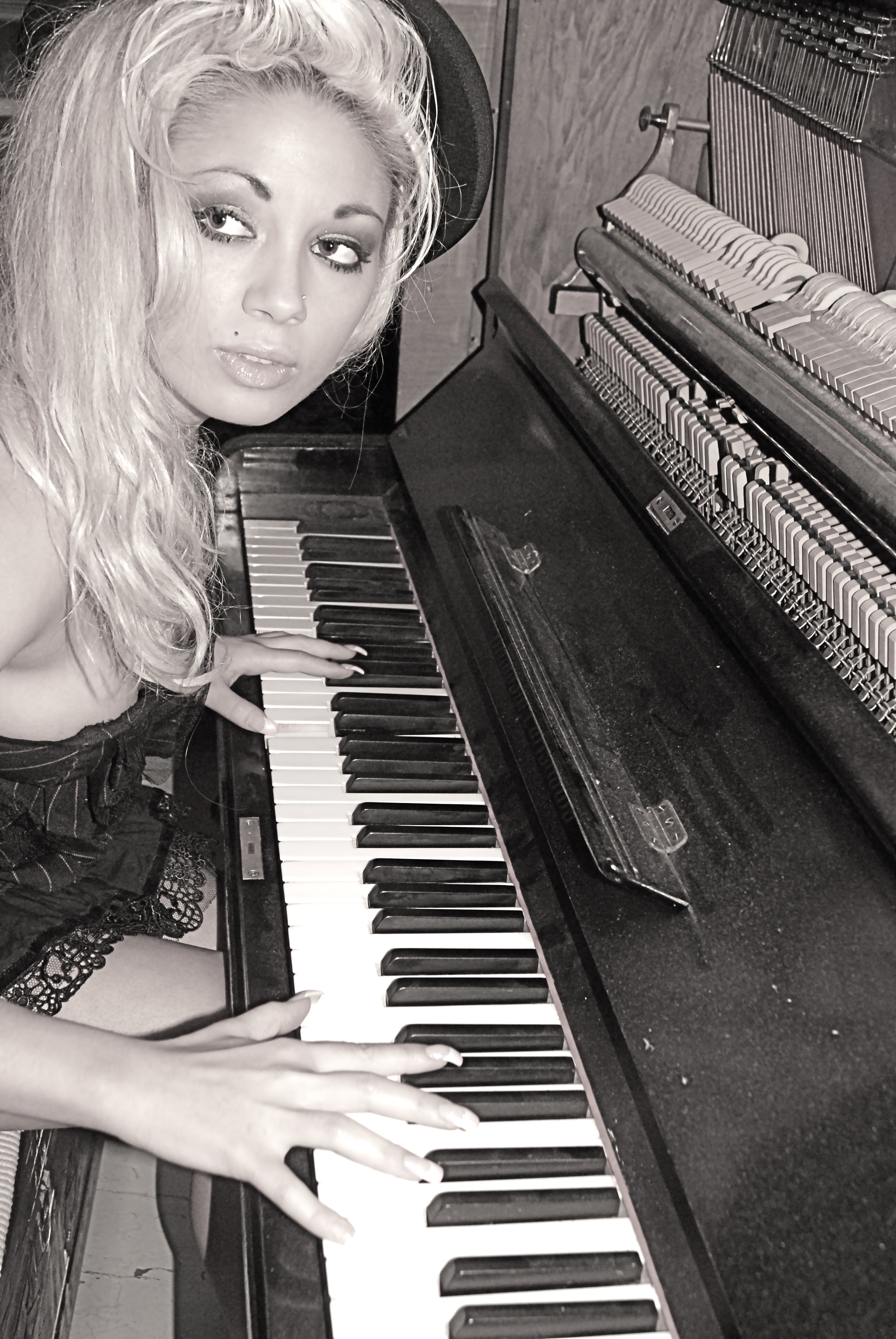
- Marika visiting director Johnsen

Background information
- Born: Marika Saralotta Lejon; 3 October 1984 (age 41); Stavanger, Rogaland, Norway
- Genres: Pop music, folk, Electro pop, Metal pop
- Occupation: Singer-songwriter
- Years active: 2004–present
- Website: marikalejon.com

Marika Lejon (born 3 October 1984 in Stavanger) is a Norwegian composer and singer. She grew up in Søgne Municipality, in the south of Norway, with a Norwegian father and a Czech mother. Her parents were both journalists, so she had the opportunity to travel and see the world.

She was educated at University of Oslo in Media Studies, and completed a master's degree autumn 2010. She was also educated nutritionist at Norges Idrettshøgskole and webmaster at Gjøvik University College. From 2014 to 2015 Marika Lejon worked as an editor for Gymgrossisten Magazine (CDON Group). Since 2007 she has worked as a journalist for different magazines.

== Music ==
At the age of 5, she started to learn how to play the piano by a private music teacher. Two years later she ditched the piano in favor of voice-lessons which lasted until she was 16. At the age of 6, she started composing music. Before she started performing on TV, she participated in, among other things, NM Rock 2000 (Finale of the Rockefeller in Oslo, where she was voted as the best vocalist), by:Larm 2002 (youngest participant). NRK.no.

Lejon released her first single "To Milan" in 2004. She participated in "Kjempesjansen" autumn 2006 with the self-composed song "Again" and the gypsy song "Nane Tsocha". She participated in the Melodi Grand Prix 2007 (the Norwegian Eurovision Song Contest selection) with the song "Perfect Sin" which was written by the Swedish Adam AlverMark. Then she participated in the Norwegian's Got Talents on TV2. In 2009 she released her debutalbum "My Fire". She calls the genre on this record "Gipsypop".

In 2011 she participated for the second time in the Melodi Grand Prix with the self-composed song "Hungry for You (Gipsy Dance)", but didn't get to the finals. According to her, she wrote the song while she was writing the thesis, longing for dancing and laughter.

Lejon released her second album "Before Death" in 2015. The name of the album was decided, because all the songs were made before her mother dies of cancer in 2014. The cover was also made in Iceland (at Reynisdrangar), just one month before her mother died.

In August 2015 Lejon became a mother to Lorren Karlotta Arnthorsdottir Lejon.

11 June 2018, Lejon received the Dixi award, awarded by the Norwegian Minister of Children and Equality, Linda Hofstad Helleland. Lejon received the award because of her work to prevent sexual abuse. She is the editor of a platform where assailants can share their stories anonymously.

== Discography ==
=== Albums ===
- My Fire (2009)
- Before Death (2015)

=== Singles ===
- "To Milan" (2004)
- "Perfect Sin" (2007)
- "Hard As Steel" (2008)
- "Hungry for You (Gipsy Dance)" (2011)
