= Oslofjord Convention Center =

Building in Vestfold, Norway

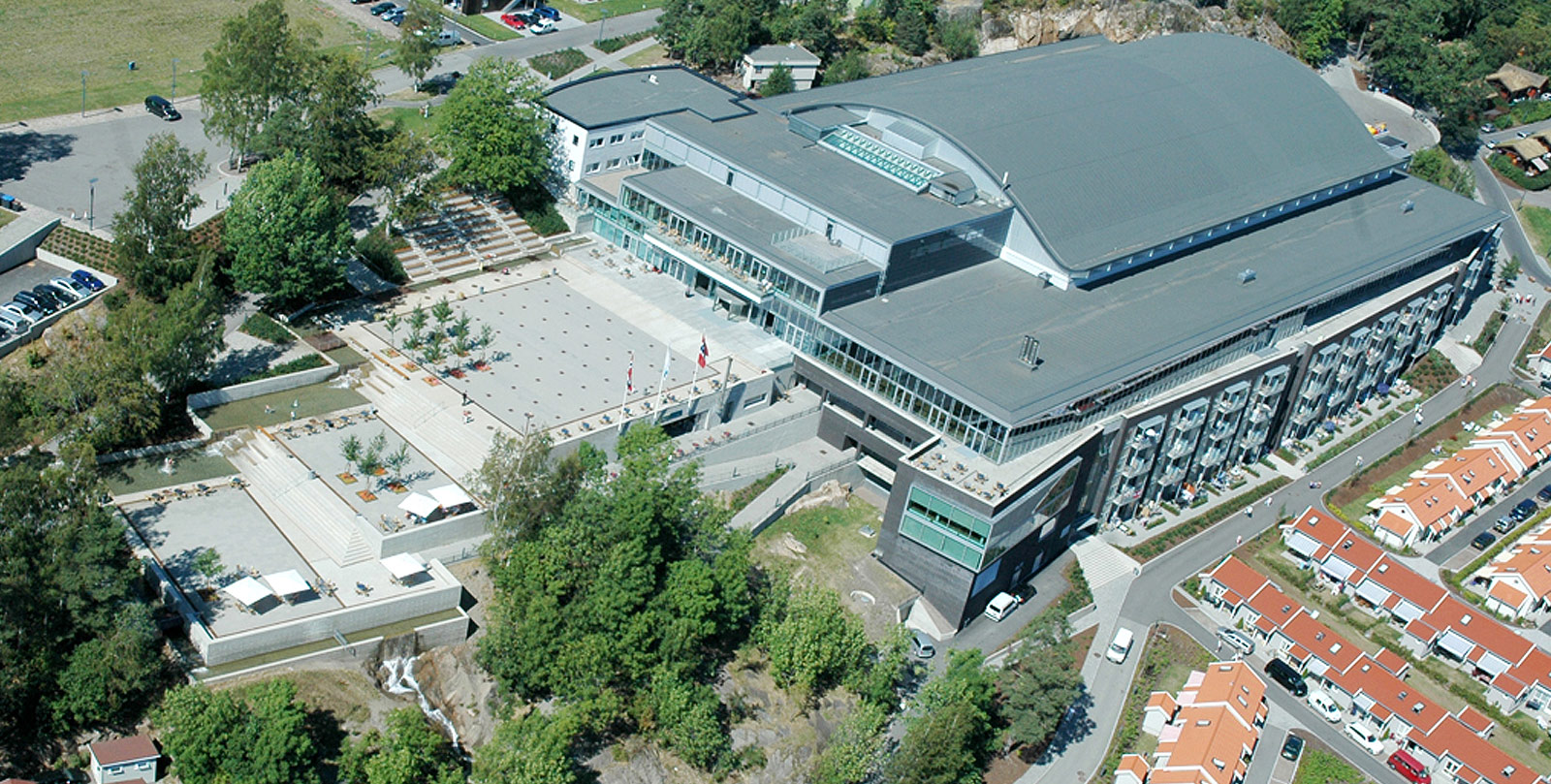
- Interactive map of Oslofjord Convention Center
- Location: Stokke, Norway
- Coordinates: 59.228°N 10.365°E
- Owner: Oslofjordstiftelsen
- Operator: Oslofjord Convention Center AS

Construction
- Renovated: 2022

Website
- www.oslofjord.com

Oslofjord Convention Center is a convention center in Stokke, Norway, as well as the company established to manage the facility.

== Ownership and management ==
Oslofjord Convention Center is one of Europe’s largest venues for conferences, conventions, events and large-scale gatherings, with accommodation, meeting facilities and event arenas integrated across one destination.

Since 2024, the venue has been owned by Oslofjordstiftelsen, an independent and non-religious commercial foundation established to own, develop and operate Oslofjord as a professional event destination.

Oslofjordstiftelsen has no owners, and all surplus is reinvested in the operation and further development of the venue. Daily operations, sales, event delivery and business development are carried out by Oslofjord Convention Center AS, while the organisation is managed by an experienced leadership team and board with backgrounds from large-scale events, operations and business.

The site has a long history as a gathering place and was for many years primarily used by Brunstad Christian Church (BCC). From around 2000 onwards, the area was extensively developed with new hotel buildings, event venues and infrastructure, laying the foundation for its current capacity and role as an international event destination. BCC remains one of several tenants using the venue during parts of the year but has no ownership interest in Oslofjord.

Today, Oslofjord continues to evolve as a commercial destination for national and international conferences, conventions and events.. Until 2000 the facility was only used by Brunstad Christian Church. Following a major upgrade in 2004, the center now operates as a commercial convention center hosting large-scale corporate exhibitions and conventions.

== Oslofjord Convention Center ==
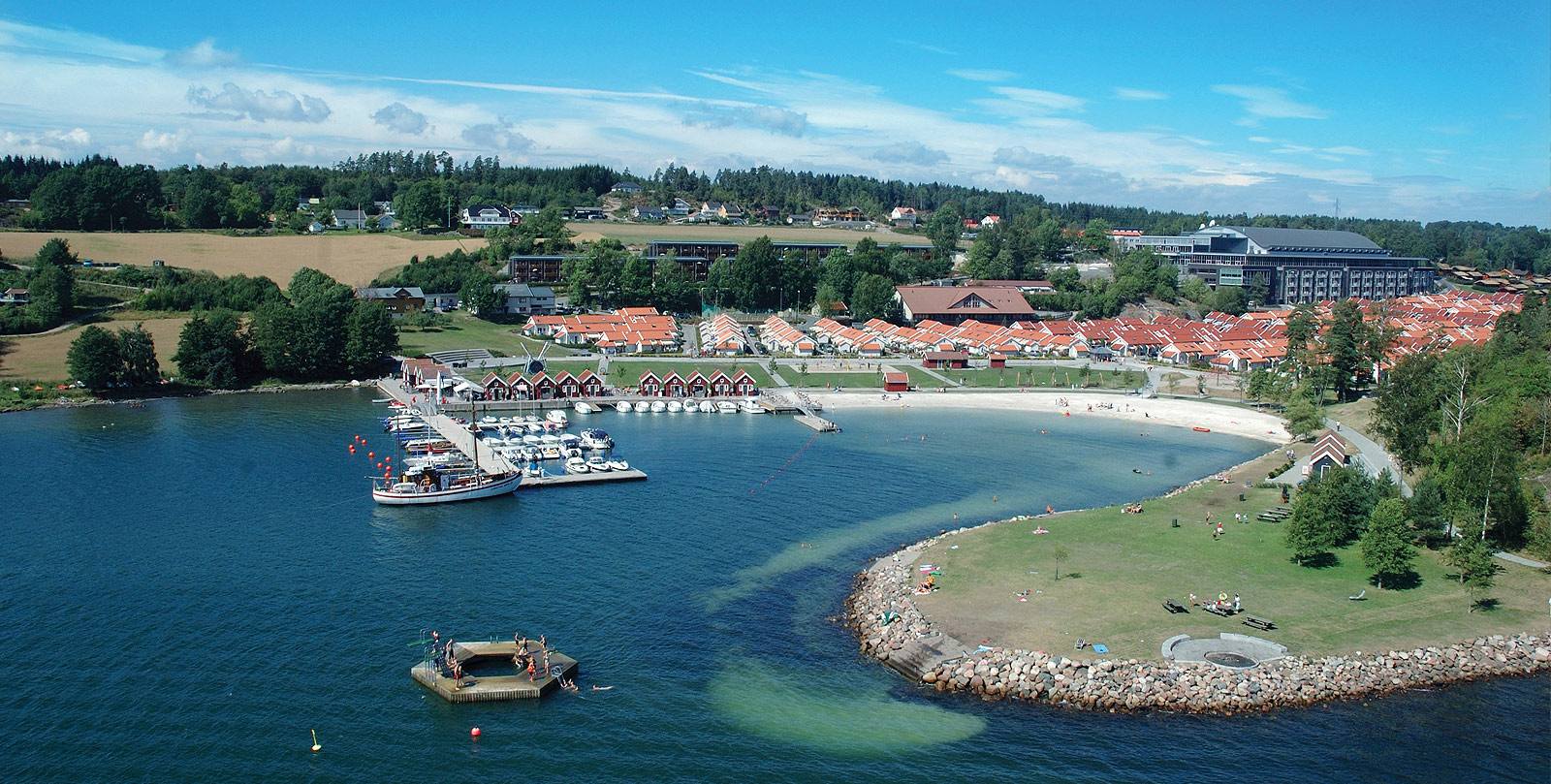
Oslofjord Convention Center by the fjord in Stokke, Norway

Oslofjord Convention Center is a conference and event venue located in Melsomvik, between the cities of Sandefjord and Tønsberg in Vestfold, Norway. Situated on the shores of the Oslofjord, the facility comprises conference venues, hotels, sports facilities, restaurants and outdoor areas within a single integrated campus.

The venue is used for conferences, conventions, exhibitions, cultural events, sports competitions and other large-scale gatherings. Oslofjord Convention Center has accommodation capacity for approximately 9,000 guests and can host up to 14,000 participants per day across its various facilities.

The site has undergone extensive development since the early 2000s, including the construction of hotels, event venues, sports facilities and supporting infrastructure. A major expansion designed by Norwegian architect Niels Torp was completed in phases, with the newest conference facilities opening in 2022.

The venue includes several event and meeting facilities, among them:

Conference Center South, featuring a plenary hall with seating for up to 6,800 people. Conference Center North, opened in 2022, with meeting rooms and banquet facilities. Oslofjord Arena, a multi-purpose arena opened in 2018 and used for sports, exhibitions, concerts and other events. Oslofjord Hotel, containing hotel rooms, meeting facilities, restaurants and hospitality areas.

The venue also includes extensive outdoor areas, beaches, sports facilities and recreational spaces. Oslofjord Arena comprises an indoor ice rink, outdoor football pitches, climbing facilities and other sports amenities.

== Events ==
The largest horse show in Norway, the Arctic Equestrian Games, is held at Oslofjord Convention Center. The first event was held in February 2006.
