= Synnøve Svabø =

Norwegian talk show host

- Born: Synnøve Svabø; 22 September 1968 (age 56); Sunnmøre, Norway

Synnøve Svabø (born 22 September 1968 in Sunnmøre, Norway) is a Norwegian talk show host. Svabø is best known for her 1997 boob stunt on Thorbjørn Jagland who was then the Prime Minister of Norway Jagland was caught on national television placing his hands on Synnøve Svabø’s breasts. At the time Svabø was hosting the Weekend Globoid talk show.

In 2009 she was NRK's commentator in the final of the Eurovision Song Contest. During the ESC, the NRK received many complaints from Norwegian viewers who said Svabø "talked too much". Many viewers chose to watch the final on the Swedish SVT because of her. Among these, was the leader of the Broadcasting Council in the NRK, Kjellaug Nakkim.
