= Finnmarkshallen =

Indoor sports venue in Alta, Norway

Coordinates: 69.9746°N 23.2955°E

- Interactive map of Finnmarkshallen
- Capacity: 1,000
- Field size: 100 x 64 m

Construction
- Opened: 1996

Tenant
- Alta IF

Finnmarkshallen is an indoor sports venue located in the town of Alta in Alta Municipality in Finnmark county, Norway. Opened in 1996, it is the home ground of the association football club Alta IF, that plays in the Norwegian Second Division. The hall is owned by the municipality, and has a seated capacity for 1,000 people. The venue has artificial turf.
