= Forente Artister =

Norwegian charity musical group

Forente Artister (English: United Artists) was a group of Norwegian artists that went together in 1985 to record the song Sammen for livet (English: Together for Life) in order to raise money for the victims of hunger in Africa. The lyrics were written by Halvdan Sivertsen and the melody by Åge Aleksandersen. This project was inspired by Band Aid and Forente Artister was thus part of a large humanitarian initiative. The project resulted in an album which in addition to Sammen for livet also consisted of several newly recorded songs by some of the participators. The song and the project received a special award in the Spellemannsprisen 1985 (The Norwegian equivalent to Grammy Awards).

== Artists participating on «Sammen for livet» ==
- Åge Aleksandersen (songwriter og vocal)
- Halvdan Sivertsen (songwriter og vocal)
- Benedicte Adrian (vocal)
- Frank Aleksandersen (vocal)
- Alex (vocal)
- Maj Britt Andersen (vocal)
- Elisabeth Andreassen (vocal)
- Erlend Antonsen (vocal)
- Lillian Askeland (vocal)
- Gudny Aspaas (vocal)
- Beranek (vocal)
- Ingrid Bjørnov (vocal)
- Bo (vocal)
- Casino Steel (vocal)
- Freddy Dahl (vocal)
- Jan Dahlen (vocal)
- Anne Danielsen (vocal)
- Jan Eggum (vocal)
- Bjørn Eidsvåg (vocal)
- Sidsel Endresen (vocal)
- Amund Enger (vocal)
- Ole Evenrud aka Ole I'Dole (vocal)
- Torstein Flakne (vocal)
- Lage Fosheim (vocal)
- Susanne Fuhr (vocal)
- Kari Gjærum (vocal)
- Trond Granlund (vocal)
- Helge Gaarder (vocal)
- Lasse Hafreager (vocal, keyboard)
- Randi Hansen (vocal)
- Ole Hedemann (vocal)
- Anita Hegerland (vocal)
- Kine Hellebust (vocal)
- Svein Hovland (vocal)
- Magne Høyland (vocal)
- Bjøro Håland (vocal)
- Trond Ingebretsen (vocal)
- Håkon Iversen (vocal)
- Gry Jannicke Jarlum aka Jannicke (vocal)
- Jonas Fjeld (vocal)
- Finn Kalvik (vocal)
- Kai Kiil (vocal)
- Tove Karoline Knutsen (vocal)
- Pete Knutsen (vocal)
- Karin Krog (vocal)
- Hanne Krogh (vocal)
- Marit Mathiesen (vocal)
- Wenche Myhre (vocal)
- Marius Müller (vocal, guitar)
- Turid Pedersen (vocal)
- Anne Grete Preus (vocal)
- Inger Lise Rypdal (vocal)
- Eivind Rølles (vocal)
- Frode Rønli (vocal)
- Viggo Sandvik (vocal)
- Hege Schøyen (vocal)
- Claudia Scott (vocal)
- Anita Skorgan (vocal)
- Olav Stedje (vocal)
- Ketil Stokkan (vocal)
- Terje Storli (vocal)
- Per Øystein Sørensen (vocal)
- Ina Tangerud (vocal)
- Jahn Teigen (vocal)
- Lynni Treekrem (vocal)
- Terje Tysland (vocal)
- Rolf Vingsternes (vocal)
- Bente Lill Viste (vocal)
- Eldar Vågan (vocal)
- Brynjulf Blix (musician)
- Jon Christensen (musician)
- Rolf Graf (musician)
- Kate Gulbrandsen (musician)
- Svein Dag Hauge (musician)
- Per Hillestad (musician)
- Geir Holmsen (musician)
- Per Kolstad (musician)
- Geir Langslet Eriksen (musician)
- Rolf Løvland (musician)
- Paolo (musician)
- Bent Patey (musician)
- Nils Bjarne Kvam (produsent)
- Bengt Eriksen (technician)
- Inge Holst-Jacobsen (technician)
- Rune Lindquist (technician)
- Tore Tambs Lyche (technician)
- Rune Nordal (technician)
- Roger Valstad (technician)

== Venn ( Friend ) (2005) ==
In January 2005, after the earthquake and tsunami in the Indian Ocean 2004, a collection of Norwegian artist came together to record the song "Friend" which was written by Espen Lind and Lene Marlin. The initiative was taken by The Spellemann Award who gathered a total of 70 Norwegian artists to volunteer for flood victims in Southeast Asia. The song was released on the double album Friend and a number of artists donated their songs for this album project. The song "Friend" was produced by Bjorn Nessjø and Stargate. The money from the sale of this album was earmarked for Red Cross work in the hard-hit Aceh province in Indonesia.

== Participating artists on "Venn" ( "Friend" ) ==
- Espen Lind
- Lene Marlin
- Morten Abel
- Rein Alexander
- Maj Britt Andersen
- Elisabeth Andreassen
- Marianne Antonsen
- Maria Arredondo
- Nora Brockstedt
- Thomas Dybdahl
- Karen Jo Fields
- Espen Grjotheim
- Tore Hansen
- Anita Hegerland
- Hilde Heltberg
- Sivert Høyem
- Bjøro Håland
- Kari Iveland
- Jenny Jenssen
- Lise Karlsnes
- Dina (artist)
- Hanne Krogh
- Kine Ludvigsen
- Sandra Lyng Haugen
- Kurt Nilsen
- Odd Nordstoga
- Sissel Kyrkjebø
- Ravi
- Samsaya
- Odd Arne Sørensen
- Knut Anders Sørum
- Mariann Thomassen
- Liv Marit Wedvik
- Leif Anders Wentzel
- Bertine Zetlitz
