= Svein Dag Hauge =

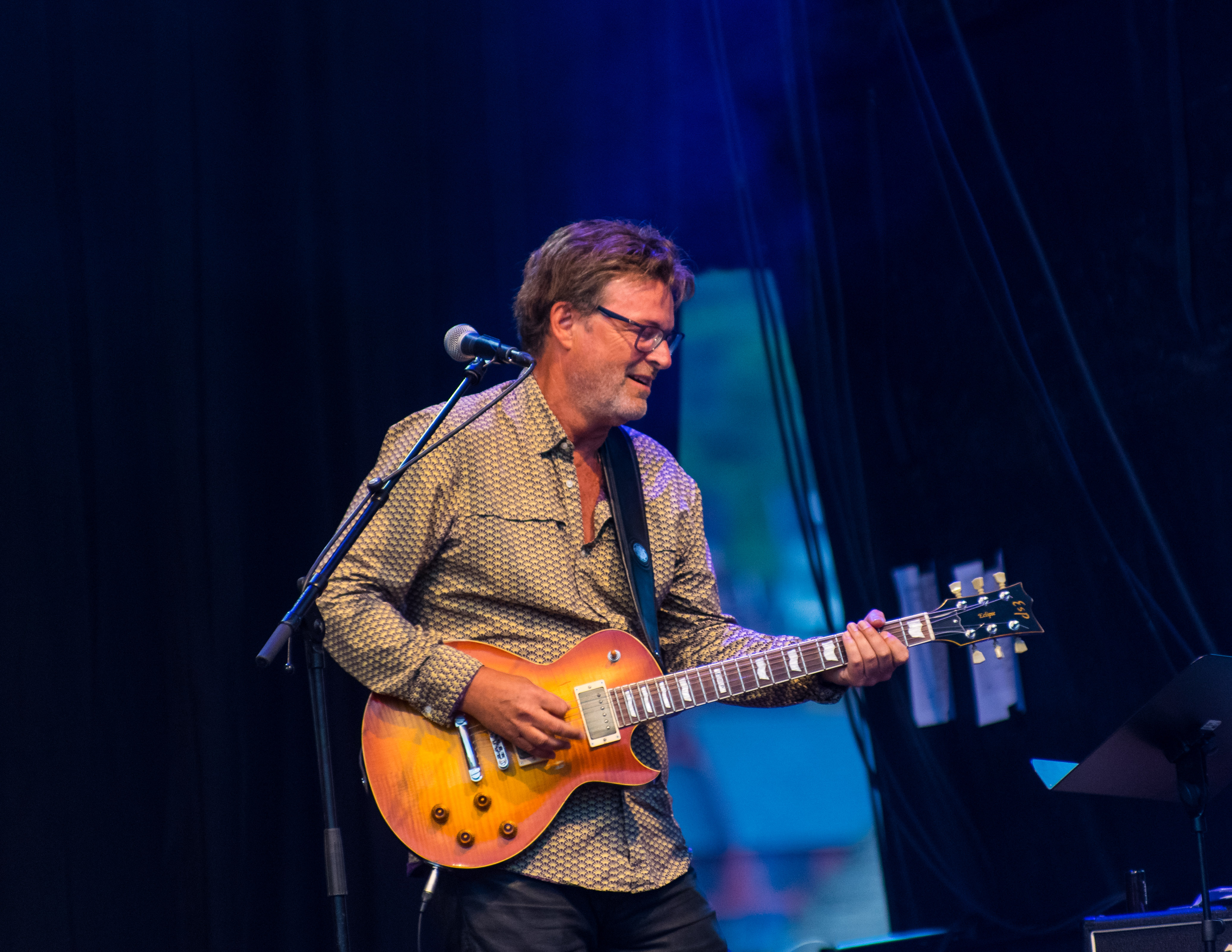

Background information
- Born: 23 October 1956 (age 69); Årdal, Sogn og Fjordane, Norway
- Genres: Jazz, pop
- Occupations: Musician, composer
- Instrument: Guitar
- Label: Polydor Records

Svein Dag Hauge (born 23 October 1956 in Årdal Municipality, Norway) is a Norwegian jazz musician (guitar) and record producer, known from the band Lava and numerous recordings as a studio musician.

== Career ==
His early career began in Olav Stedje Band «Compact» (1973). In addition, he has been a key producer for such Olav Stedje, contributed with Jahn Teigen, Trond-Viggo Torgersen, Dollie de Luxe, Marius Müller, Randi Hansen, Ketil Stokkan, Bobbysocks, Torhild Nigar, Hilde Heltberg and Tre Busserulls. Recently, he has been responsible for productions at Den Norske Opera (Izzat, 2006).

In 1986, he produced the album A Matter of Attitude by Danish heavy rockers Fate.

He received the diploma, one of the jury's special awards during Spellemannprisen 1981, as well as receiving Gammleng-prisen 1985 in the class Studio.

== Honors ==
- 1981: Spellemannprisen the jurys special award
- 1984: Spellemannprisen in the class Pop, within Lava
- 1985: Gammleng-prisen in the class Studio

== Discography ==
=== Solo albums ===
Within Lava

- 1980: Lava (Polydor Records)
- 1981: Cruisin (Polydor Records)
- 1982: Prime Time (Polydor Records)
- 1984: Fire (Polydor Records)
- 1985: Prime Cuts (Polydor Records), Compilation
- 1990: Rhythm of Love (Polydor Records)
- 1996: The Very Best of Lava (Polydor Records), Compilation
- 2003: Polarity (Polydor Records)
- 2005: Alibi (Polydor Records)
- 2009: Symphonic Journey (Polydor Records), live album

=== Collaborations ===
With Olav Stedje

- 1981: Ta Meg Med (Hot Line)
- 1982: Tredje Stedje (Hot Line)
- 2006: Livstegn (Tylden & Co)
- 2011: Ikkje Utan Deg (Tylden & Co)

With Jahn Teigen

- 1979: En Dags Pause (RCA Victor)
- 1983: Friendly (RCA Victor), featuring Anita Skorgan

With Alex

- 1979: Hello I Love You! (Mercury Records)

With Trond Granlund

- 1981: Pleasant Surprise (CBS Records)
- 1982: Stay The Night (CBS Records)

With Eigil Berg

- 1981: Alhambra (Mercury Records)

With George Keller

- 1981: Resten Kan Du Tenke Deg (Snowflake Skandinavisk Artist Produksjon)

With Anita Skorgan

- 1981: Pastell (Snowflake Skandinavisk Artist Produksjon)
- 1985: Karma (Sonet Records)

With Kjell Fjalsett

- 1982: Forandring (New Song)

With Ketil Bjørnstad

- 1983: Aniara (Slagerfabrikken), Rock opera
- 2006: Coastlines (), feat. Lill Lindfors

Within Prima Vera

- 1983: Her Kommer Olavs Menn'' (Sonet Records)

With Terje Bakke & Test 1

- 1983: Høyt Spill (Test Records)

With Rust

- 1983: Rust (EMI Records)

Within Silhouette

- 1984: Silhouette (RCA Victor)

With Egil Eldøen

- 1985: Welcome Into My Heart (Sonet Records)
- 1988: Here We Go Again (Sonet Records)

With Lill Lindfors

- 1985: Människors Makt (Slagerfabrikken)

Within Mr. Walker And The Walkmen

- 1985: Walking (CBS Records)

Within CCCP

- 1985: Let's Spend The Night Together (Plateselskapet)

With Pål Thowsen

- 1986: Call Me Stranger (Polydor Records)

With Sissel Kyrkjebø

- 1986: Sissel (Noahs Ark)
- 1986: Glade Jul (Noahs Ark)
- 1994: Se Ilden Lyse (Forenede Fonogramprodusenter)

With Kate Gulbrandsen

- 1987: The Beauty And The Beat (Mariann Records)

With Jørn Hoel

- 1987: Varme Ut Av Is (Polydor Records)

With Eyvind Skeie and Sigvald Tveit

- 1987: Det Gode Landet (Fablos Records)

With Rita Eriksen

- 1988: Back From Wonderland (Desperado Records)

With Scott & Steel

- 1988: Scott & Steel (Self Release)

With Halvdan Sivertsen

- 1990: Førr Ei Dame (Plateselskapet)

With Geirr Lystrup and Maj Britt Andersen

- 1990: Maurits Og Den Store Barnålkrigen (Juni Records)

With Dag Kolsrud

- 1991: December II (MD Records)

With Elisabeth Andreassen

- 1992: Stemninger (Polydor Records)

With Silje Vige

- 1993: Alle Mine Tankar (Kirkelig Kulturverksted)

With Andrew Matheson

- 1993: Night Of The Bastard Moon (MCA Records)

With Tom Pacheco

- 1994: Robert And Ramona Single (Sonet Records)

With Hilde Heltberg

- 1997: Blant Konger Og Lus (Mega Records)

With Annbjørg Lien

- 1999: Baba Yaga (Grappa Music)

With Dollie de Luxe

- 2005: Rock Vs. Opera (Grappa Music)

Awards
Preceded by Freddy Lindquist and Jon Christensen	Recipient of the Studio Gammleng-prisen; 1985	Succeeded by Bjørn Nessjø and Per Nyhaug
