= Rolf Graf (musician) =

- Born: 28 April 1960; Oslo, Norway
- Died: 1 July 2013 (aged 53) Oslo, Norway
- Genres: Jazzrock, Rock, Pop
- Occupation: Musician
- Instrument(s): Bass guitar, trumpet, vocals
- Labels: Polydor
- Formerly of: Lava
- Website: grafmusic.com/rolf

Rolf Graf (28 April 1960 – 1 July 2013) was a Norwegian singer, bass guitarist, composer and record producer, and the younger brother of keyboardist Haakon Graf (b. 21 March 1955) and the jazz singer Randi Elisabeth Graf (b. 12 September 1966). He is best known as the bassist in the band Lava, but was also recognized as music producer, musician and songwriter for other artists like Randy Crawford, Mezzoforte and Sissel Kyrkjebø. He also released three solo albums and was editor of the journal Musikkpraksis.

== Career ==
=== Musician ===
Graf was born and died in Oslo, Norway. He was raised in a musical family and was greatly inspired by his older brother Haakon known from bands like 'Ruphus', 'Hawk on Flight', and collaborations with such as Terje Rypdal and Jan Garbarek. Graf started his career in 1967 on trumpet, and debuted as a soloist 1 Christmas Day 1972 in Manglerud church.

In 1974 he substituted the trumpet to bass guitar and started the following year a rock band together with the guitarist Marius Müller. In 1979 he got his first professional studio job as a funk bass player. Graf was among the first funk bassists in Norway that restrained slap and snap technique, and the artist and vocalist Alex, or Alex Naumik Sandøy, who was among the first artists to introduced the funk rock in Norway, hired him to play on her album Daddy Child, because her bass player and producer Svein Gundersen failed to play this new style.

The same year he also received a request from Svein Dag Hauge to join the band Lava, where Marius Müller just had joined and recommended Graf, after meeting with Hauge. Lava's second album Cruisin', sold to Silver and climbed the charts. Grafs first composition, "Take Your Time" (with lyrics by Ivar Dyrhaug), climbed to the top of the European summit. Seven CD album was recorded at Lava and a variety of studio work, as well as a composer and producer on numerous recordings.

In 1985 Graf recorded his debut solo album The Boy Next Door, which was released in 13 European countries. This led to appearances in British and Danish TV shows. From the mid 1980s onwards 1990s Graf worked in various compositions, including with Olav Stedje og Egil Eldøen in the band project 'Stedje/Graf/Eldøen', and this was the first band to play at the opening of Rockefeller Music Hall in 1986. Otherwise contributed Graf as a studio musician with artists like Sissel Kyrkjebø, Randy Crawford and Elisabeth Andreassen.

For a period in the 1990s, Graf worked in Los Angeles and New York as a songwriter and producer, and had the production of an American band called 'The Ancestors' where he replaced the producer Eddie Kramer, and collaborated with musician and actor Rick Springfield as songwriter. Graf has also produced the debut album Stille vann by Norwegian artist Torhild Nigar in the New York studio Manhattan Center Studios.

Lava made their comeback album Polarity in 2003. This led to a lot of activity on the Norwegian music scene, and appearances on NRK television along with Hanne Boel, among others. In 2005 the band released the sequel Alibi, and in 2009 Lava released their last album, Symphonic Journey, in collaboration with Kringkastingsorkesteret.

=== Composer ===
Graf was invited to participate as a composer in Melodi Grand Prix 1983, and delivered the song "Melodi" performed by Olav Stedje as number four. In Melodi Grand Prix 1985 he performed his self-composed song, "II & II". Since this he participated several times in the 1980s and 1990s, but then only as a songwriter. In 1984 he launched a side project called 'Mr. Walker & The Walkmen' together with Steinar Fjeld and Ståle Rasmussen, and got a hit with "This Is Your Walkman Talking". During 1985, 30 of his compositions released on record with different musicians, including himself. Best known from this time were the ballad "Shine", performed together with Egil Eldøen and the Swedish singer Frank Ådahl. The song was the highlight of Grafs debut solo album, The Boy Next Door. The album was released in 13 countries, and Graf appeared on television in England and Denmark.

=== Producer ===
As a producer worked Graf with several other musicians, including Randy Crawford (USA), Mezzoforte (Iceland), The Ancestors (USA), Tindrum, Aina Olsen, Trine Rein, Jan Werner Danielsen, Torhild Nigar and 'Floweryard'. He also created music for the movies Frida – med hjertet i hånden, Petra og kuule småkryp by Torhild Nigar and Brødrene Dal Og Vikingsverdets Forbannelse. In 1996 he produced the album I evighet by Elisabeth Andreassen, who received second place in the international Melodi Grand Prix final in Oslo Spektrum.

Late 1980s Graf started a trio with Egil Eldøen and Olav Stedje. Musically, this was a continuation of the acoustic, country rock, inspired by Eagles and Crosby, Stills & Nash. The trio was disbanded before they managed to make a record together. In the early 1990s he was oriented towards Latin music within the trio 'Some Like It Hot' including Lakki Patey (band leader) and Sergio Gonzales (reunited in 2004).

In 2001 Graf finally found time to record a new solo album Oddity Two Acceptance, where he played almost all the instruments by himself. The album also includes a retake of "Shine".

Graf also taught in 'Knowledge of the music industry' at 'Nordisk Institutt for Scene og Studio', and wrote a recipe for the project Opp og Fram on behalf of Høgskolen i Harstad.

In 2011 Graf worked with other musicians and artists including Ronni Le Tekrø and Jan Ingvar Toft.

Graf was buried in Holmenkollen Chapel on 11 July 2013.

== Discography ==
=== Solo albums ===
- 1985: The Boy Next Door (Mariann)
- 1997: Floating (MultiMusic)
- 2001: Oddity To Acceptance (MultiMusic)

=== Collaborations ===
Tom Bråthen & Phoenix

- 1979: Jeg Drømmer Om Nashville

Lava

- 1980: Lava (Polydor Records)
- 1981: Cruisin' (Polydor Records)
- 1982: Prime Time (Polydor Records)
- 1984: Fire (Polydor Records)
- 1985: Prime Cuts (Polydor Records)
- 1990: Rhythm of Love (Polydor Records)
- 1996: The Very Best of Lava (Polydor Records)
- 2003: Polarity (Polydor Records)
- 2005: Alibi (album)|Alibi (Polydor Records)
- 2009: Symphonic Journey (Polydor Records)

Svein Strøm

- 1980: My Life Is My Life

Gry Jannicke Jarlum

- 1981: Min Stil
- 1983: Draculas Datter
- 1989: Svake mennesker
- 2005: Aksepterad – De 18 Beste Norske

Eigil Berg

- 1981: Alhambra
- 1986: Here We Go Again

Trond-Viggo Torgersen

- 1981: Det by'ner nå!
- 1997: Trond-Viggos beste

Marius Müller

- 1981: Den Du Veit
- 1982: Er'e Så Nøye 'A
- 1983: Marius

Prima Vera

- 1981: Den 5te

Dollie de Luxe

- 1981: Dollies dagbok
- 1982: First Act

Trond Granlund

- 1981: Pleasant Surprise

Olav Stedje

- 1982: Olav Stedje
- 1982: Tredje Stedje
- 1995: Bot og bedring
- 1998: 21 Beste
- 2009: I Levande Live

Hilde Heltberg

- 1982: Hilde Heltberg
- 1991: Girls Don't

Thorleif Larsen alias Igor Kill

- 1983: Igor Kill

Vazelina Bilopphøggers

- 1983: Vælkømmin Tel Øss

Bjarte Leithaug

- 1984: En underlig familie

Arnold Børud

- 1984: Balladen Om Jesus – Rock-Opera

Forente artister

- 1985: Sammen For Livet

Alf Cranner

- 1985: Din tanke er fri

Bobbysocks

- 1985: Bobbysocks
- 1986: Waiting for the Morning

Randi Hansen

- 1985: Ansiktet i speilet

Mr. Walker and the Walkmen

- 1985: Walking

Randy Crawford

- 1986: Abstract Emotions
- 1992: Through the Eyes of Love
- 1999: Hits

Aina S. Olsen

- 1988: Living in a Boy's World

Small Affairs

- 1988: Out of Memory

Rita Eriksen

- 1988: Back from Wonderland (1988)

Mezzoforte

- 1989: Playing for Time
- 2003: The Very Best of Mezzoforte
- 2007: Anniversary Edition
- 2008: Live in Reykjavik

Tvers

- 1989: Tvers synger Crouch

Viggo & Reidar

- 1989: Tidligere utgitt på alvor

Romance

- 1989: Angel

Ola Fjellvikås

- 1989: Min Mona Lisa

Captain Miracle

- 1990: Voyage To Sensational Alex Harvey Band

TinDrum

- 1991: Cool, Calm and Collected

Oks Singers & Band

- 1992: Live! Camp Meeting

Hanne Krogh

- 1994: 40 Beste

Torhild Nigar

- 1994: Stille Vann

Jan Werner Danielsen

- 1994: All By Myself

Elisabeth Andreassen

- 1996: I evighet
- 1996: Eternity

Bare Egil Band

- 1996: Absolutt Ikke Bare Egil Band

Merethe Trøan

- 1996: Æ Gir Dæ Min Vår
- 1996: Søtt & Salt (1996)
- 1996: Kom Te Mæ (1996)
- 1997: Ild & vann (1997)

Jannicke Abrahamsen

- 199: Jannicke 7

KLM

- 1997: Viking Arne
- 1997: Brødrene Dal på vikingtokt
- 2002: De Beste

Triple & Touch

- 1998: De 3 Vise Männen
- 2008: 1000 Gånger

Oslo Gospel Choir

- 1999: Millenium
- 1999: Power

Øyvind Blunck

- 1999: Fridtjofs Helaften

Kikki, Bettan & Lotta

- 2002: Vem é dé du vill ha

Floweryard

- 2003: The Rain
- 2003: Path of Tears
- 2003:Morning Mist

Clausen + Wille

- 2003: Fri

Tommy Michaelsen

- 2005: Completely

Trygve Wikstøl

- 2006: Hei

Det Betales

- 2007: Har du det bra?
- 2007: Guri & en Chevy

Hovedøen Social Club

- 2009: Ay caramba!

Otto Graf

- 2009: Autographs

Cecilie Nesstrand

- 2011: Tør du tenke, with Jan Toft
- 2011: Ett Liv

Other projects

- 1983: DEFA-kampanjen 83–84
- 1989: Musikalen Jungelboken
- 1992: Norwegian Power Ballads
- 1994: Up And Coming: The Sound Of Young Norway
- 1994: Fine Norske Vinterlåter
- 1994: Gloryland WorldCup USA 94
- 1995: Solskiva – Årets Nye Sommersanger
- 1996: Topp Hits 2
- 1996: Smurfehits 1
- 1996: Norsk Gull! Topplag Med 20 Norske Artister
- 2003: Våre Beste Vinterlåter
- 2004: En Annen Dans
- 2006: Barna Synger Pophits
