= Per Kolstad =

Norwegian pianist

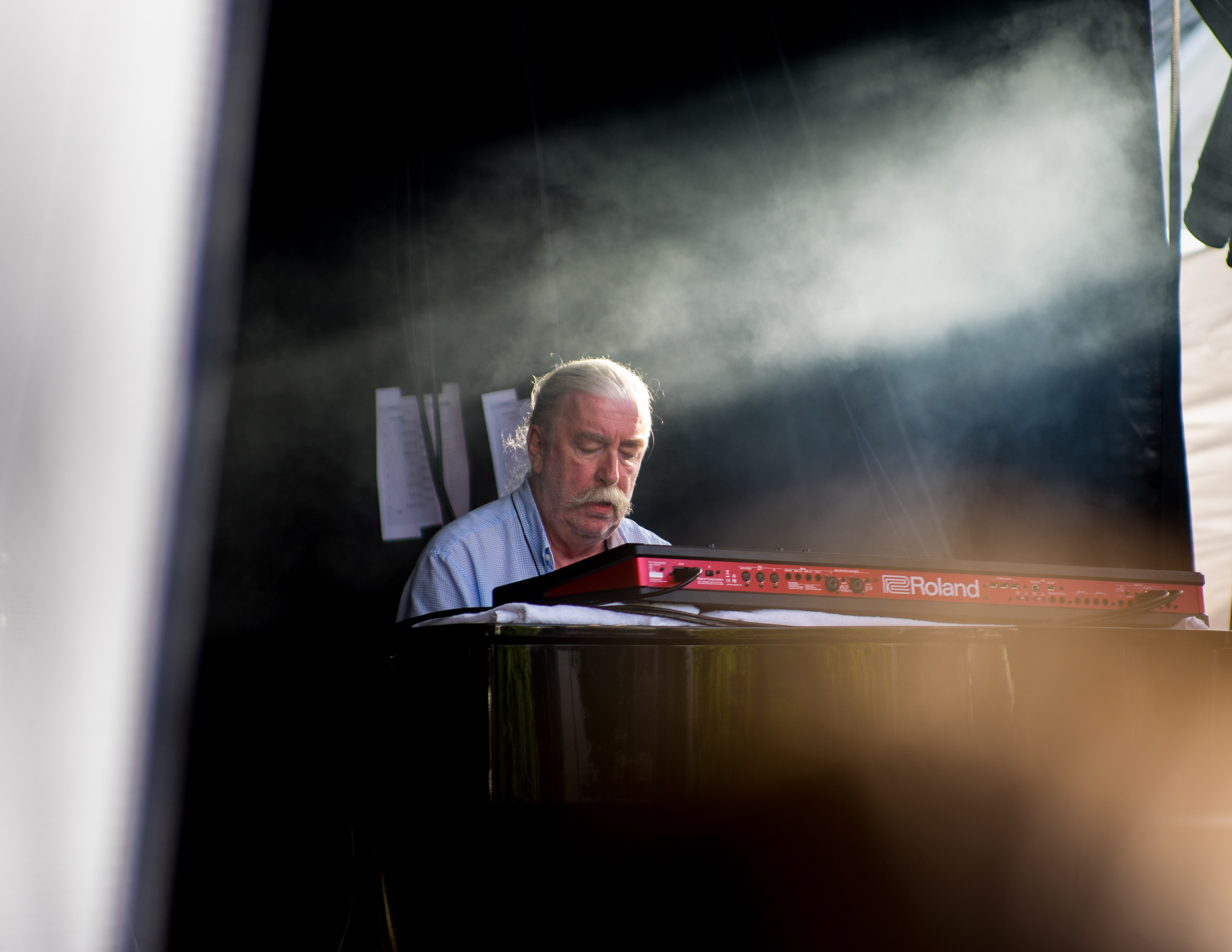

Background information
- Born: Per Atle Kolstad; 23 April 1953 (age 72)
- Origin: Norway
- Genres: Jazz, pop music
- Occupation(s): Musician, composer
- Instrument: Piano
- Labels: Polydor Records
- Website: www.groove.no/artist/57531637/per-kolstad

Per Atle Kolstad (born 25 April 1953 in Norway) is a Norwegian musician (piano & keyboards), known from the band Lava, Jonas Fjeld Band and Prima Vera, and has numerous recordings as a studio musician.

== Career ==
Kolstad has collaborated with singers and musicians like Jan Groth, Odd Nordstoga, Olav Stedje, Steinar Albrigtsen, Marius Müller, Gry Jannicke Jarlum, Tor Endresen, Bjørn Eidsvåg, Finn Kalvik, Sissel Kyrkjebø and Alf Cranner. He was also keyboardist within the band Son of Sam. In 1984 he received Spellemannprisen as part of the band Lava for their album Fire.

Kolstad is an associate professor at the Agder University College (2013).

== Honors ==
- 1984: Spellemannprisen in the class Pop, within Lava

== Discography ==
=== Lava albums ===
Within Lava

- 1982: Prime Time (Polydor Records)
- 1984: Fire (Polydor Records)
- 1985: Prime Cuts (Polydor Records), Compilation
- 1990: Rhythm of Love (Polydor Records)
- 1996: The Very Best of Lava (Polydor Records), Compilation
- 2003: Polarity (Polydor Records)
- 2005: Alibi (Polydor Records)
- 2009: Symphonic Journey (Polydor Records), live album

=== Collaborations ===
With Alex

- 1980: Daddy's Child (Polydor Records)

With Stein Ove Berg

- 1981: Bergtatt (NorDisc)

With Olav Stedje

- 1982: Tredje Stedje (Hot Line)
- 2006: Livstegn (Tylden & Co)
- 2011: Ikkje Utan Deg (Tylden & Co)

With Kjell Fjalsett

- 1982: Forandring (New Song)

With Terje Bakke & Test 1

- 1983: Høyt Spill (Test Records)

Within Silhouette

- 1984: Silhouette (RCA Victor)

Within Doxa

- 1984: Så Langt... (Klango Records)
- 1986: Noe Som Spirer (Scan Music)

With Jonas Fjeld Band

- 1985: Neck'n Neck (EMI Records)
- 1993: Texas Jensen (Stageway Records)

With Lill Lindfors

- 1985: Människors Makt (Slagerfabrikken)

Within Mr. Walker And The Walkmen

- 1985: Walking (CBS Records)

With Sissel Kyrkjebø

- 1986: Sissel (Noahs Ark)
- 1986: Glade Jul (Noahs Ark)
- 1994: Se Ilden Lyse (Forenede Fonogramprodusenter)

With Pål Thowsen

- 1986: Call Me Stranger (Polydor Records)

With Anne Grete Preus

- 1988: Fullmåne (Warner Music Norway)

With Rita Eriksen

- 1988: Back From Wonderland (Desperado Records)

With Egil Eldøen

- 1988: Here We Go Again (Sonet Records)

With Tom Russell Band

- 1989: Poor Man's Dream (Sonet Records)

With Geirr Lystrup & Maj Britt Andersen

- 1990: Maurits Og Den Store Barnålkrigen (Juni Records)

With Ketil Bjørnstad

- 1991: Rift - En Rockopera (Hete Blikk)

With Bjørn Eidsvåg

- 1993: Allemannsland (Norsk Plateproduksjon)

With Steinar Albrigtsen

- 1994: The Troubadour (Norsk Plateproduksjon)

With Jack Lewis

- 1996: Don't Mess Around (Rough Diamond Productions)

With Elisabeth Andreassen

- 1996: Bettans Jul (Polydor Records)

With Espen Lind

- 1997: Red (Universal Music), on the track «Niki's Theme»

With Hilde Heltberg

- 1997: Blant Konger Og Lus (Mega Records)

With Ole Paus

- 1997: Hellige Natt - Jul I Skippergata (Kirkelig Kulturverksted)
