= Geir Langslet =

Norwegian jazz pianist and band leader

- Born: 9 October 1956 (age 69); Horten, Vestfold, Norway
- Genres: Jazz, pop
- Occupations: Musician, composer
- Instruments: Piano, keyboards
- Label: Polydor

Geir Langslet (born 9 October 1956 in Horten, Norway) is a Norwegian jazz pianist and band leader raised in Fredrikstad.

== Career ==
Langslet is a graduate of the Berklee College of Music. He was a member of the band LAVA for 20 years, and participated in numerous recordings and tours in the 1980s and 1990s. He has been orchestra conductor for NRK for several years, including for Melodi Grand Prix five times, from 1995 to 1999. He had conducted the Norwegian entries in the Eurovision Song Contest three times in 1995, 1997 and 1998. He has also been band leader for "The show must go on", which is a Queen tribute concert show with Åge Sten Nilsen. Now he is a band leader for the show «Tina-Simply the Best», which is a tribute to Tina Turner.

== Honors ==
- 1984: Spellemannprisen in the class POP, with LAVA.

== Discography ==
- 1980: Lava (Polydor Records)
- 1981: Cruisin (Polydor Records)
- 1982: Prime Time (Polydor Records)
- 1984: Fire (Polydor Records)
- 1985: Prime Cuts (Polydor Records), Compilation
- 1990: Rhythm of Love (Polydor Records)
- 1996: The Very Best of Lava (Polydor Records), Compilation
- 2003: Polarity (Polydor Records)
- 2005: Alibi (Polydor Records)
- 2009: Symphonic Journey (Polydor Records), live album

With Jahn Teigen

- 1979: En Dags Pause (RCA Victor)

With Alex

- 1979: Hello I Love You! (Mercury Records)
- 1980: Daddy's Child (Polydor Records)
- 1981: Alex' Beste (Polydor Records), Compilation

With Trond Granlund

- 1981: Pleasant Surprise (CBS Records)

With Stein Ove Berg

- 1981: Bergtatt (NorDics)

With Anita Skorgan

- 1981: Pastell (Snowflake Skandinavisk Artist Produksjon )

With Prima Vera

- 1981: Ha Ha He He Ho! (De Gærne Har'e Godt) (RCA Victor)
- 1983: Her Kommer Olavs Menn (RCA Victor)

With Olav Stedje

- 1982: Tredje Stedje (Hot Line)
- 2006: Livstegn (Tylden & Co)
- 2011: Ikkje Utan Deg (Tylden & Co)

With Kjell Fjalsett

- 1982: Forandring (New Song)

With Ketil Bjørnstad

- 1983: Aniara (New Song), Rock opera

With Terje Bakke & Test 1

- 1983: Høyt Spill (Test Records)

Within Silhouette

- 1984: Silhouette (RCA Victor)

Within Doxa

- 1984: Så Langt... (Klango Records)
- 1986: Noe Som Spirer (Scan Music)

With Lill Lindfors

- 1985: Människors Makt (Slagerfabrikken)

With Sissel Kyrkjebø

- 1986: Sissel (Noahs Ark)
- 1986: Glade Jul (Noahs Ark)
- 1994: Se Ilden Lyse (Forenede Fonogramprodusenter)

With Pål Thowsen

- 1986: Call Me Stranger (Polydor Records)

With Rita Eriksen

- 1988: Back From Wonderland (Desperado Records)

With Egil Eldøen

- 1988: Here We Go Again (Sonet Records)

With Elisabeth Andreassen

- 1996: Bettans Jul (Polydor Records)
