= Per Hillestad =

Norwegian drummer and record producer

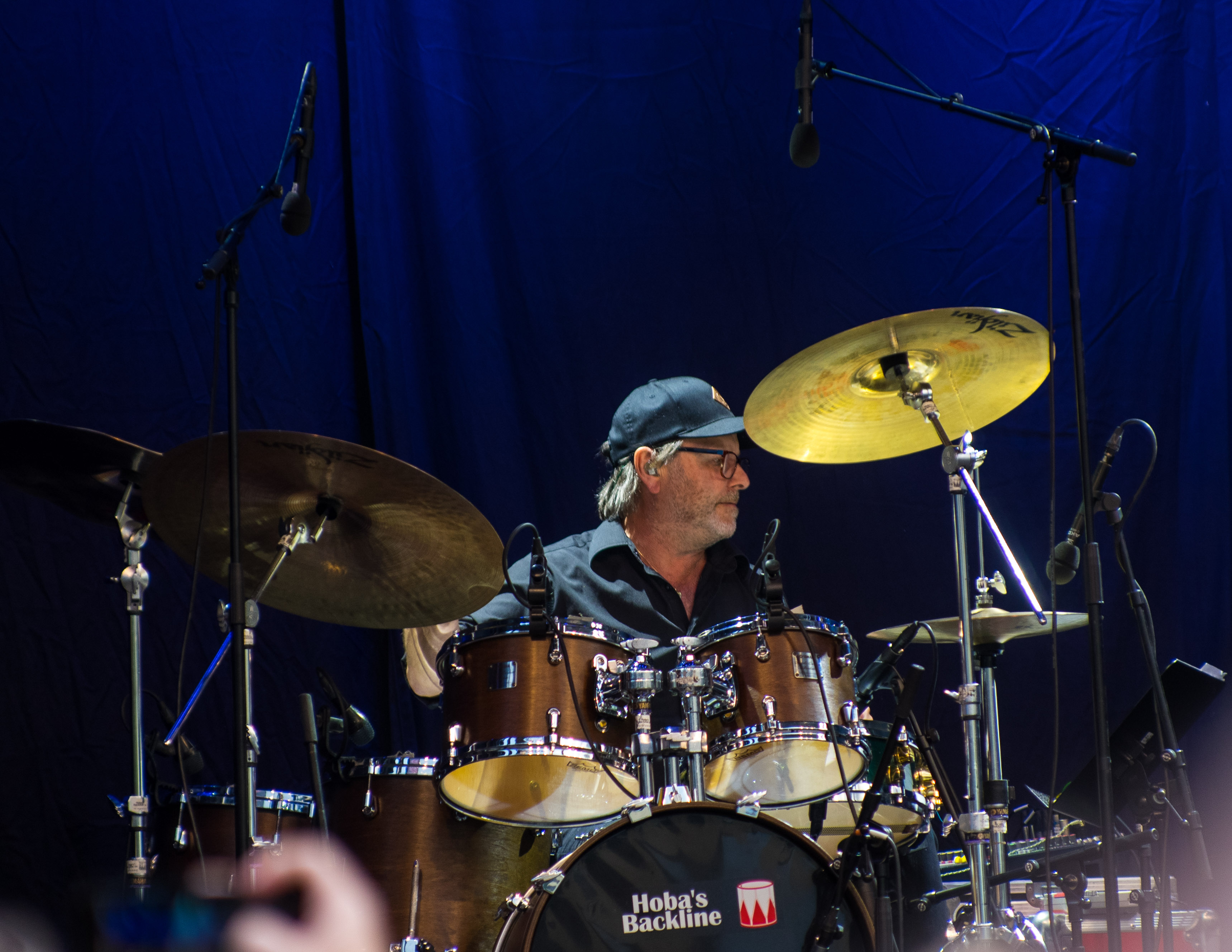

Background information
- Born: 25 March 1959 (age 67); Øvre Årdal, Sogn og Fjordane
- Origin: Norway
- Genres: Jazz, pop
- Occupations: Musician and composer
- Instruments: Drums and percussions

Per Hillestad (born 25 March 1959 in Øvre Årdal, Norway) is a Norwegian musician (drums) and record producer, known as drummer in Lava and was contributing in releases by a-ha, Vamp, Jonas Fjeld, Bjølsen Valsemølle and Marius Müller.

== Career ==
Hillestad founded "supergroup" Lava in Årdal 1977, together with Kjell Hestetun, Stein Eriksen and Svein Dag Hauge. From 1980 Lava released a series of albums receiving very good reviews. They were awarded Spellemannsprisen in 1984 for the album Fire, and has been nominated for the award several times. Lava has among others toured together with the vocalist Randy Crawford in Australia, Asia and Africa.

Hillestad also played on albums by Vigdis Eidsvåg (Mørk Og Mjuk 2000), D.D.E. (Vi E Konga 2003), Øystein Sunde (Sånn Er'e Bare 2005) and Jan Groth (2006).

== Honors ==
- 1984: Spellemannsprisen in the class Pop, within the band Lava
- 1995: Gammleng-prisen in the class Studio.

== Discography (in selection) ==
Within Lava

- 1980: Lava Single (Polydor Records)
- 1981: Cruisin (Polydor Records)
- 1982: Prime Time (Polydor Records)
- 1984: Fire (Polydor Records)
- 1985: Prime Cuts (Polydor Records)
- 1989: The Rhythm of Love (Mercury Records)
- 1993: The Very Best of Lava (Polydor Records), Compilation
- 2003: Polarity (Tylden & Co)
- 2005: Alibi (Tylden & Co)
- 2009: Symphonic Journey (Tylden & Co), live album with KORK

With Ketil Bjørnstad

- 1983: Aniara (Slagerfabrikken), rock opera
- 1991: Rift – En Rockopera (Hete Blikk)
- 1992: Messe For En Såret Jord (Kirkelig Kulturverksted)
- 1993: Water Stories (ECM Records), including Terje Rypdal, Jon Christensen & Bjørn Kjellemyr
- 1994: For Den Som Elsker (Kirkelig Kulturverksted), with lyrics by Stein Mehren performed by Frøydis Armand
- 1996: Haugtussa (Kirkelig Kulturverksted), with lyrics by Arne Garborg performed by Lynni Treekrem

With Silhouette

- 1984: Silhouette (RCA Victor), texts & music written by Philip A. Kruse & George Keller

With Øystein Sunde

- 1984: I Husbukkens Tegn (Spinner Records)
- 1986: Overbuljongterningpakkmesterassistent (Spinner Records)
- 1989: Kjekt Å Ha (Tomato Records)
- 1994: Du Må'kke Komme Her Og Komme Her (Philips Records)

With Lill Lindfors

- 1985: Människors Makt (Slagerfabrikken)

With Jonas Fjeld

- 1985: Neck'n Neck (CBS Records)
- 1989: Svært Nok For Meg (EMI Records)
- 1992: Texas Jensen (Stageway Records)

With Act

- 1985: September Field (Odeon)

With Vindél

- 1986: Perfect Crime (Bahama Records)

With Marius Müller's Funhouse

- 1991: Maximum (Second Hand Records)
- 1995: Mia's Song Single (Sonet Records)
- 2009: Plugged 2 – Rett Og Slett (Slagerfabrikken)

With Sissel Kyrkjebø

- 1987: Sissel (Noahs Ark)
- 1994: Se Ilden Lyse (Forenede Fonogramprodusenter)

With Doxa

- 1987: Noe Som Spirer (Scan Music), feat. Sigurd Køhn

With Anne Grete Preus

- 1988: Fullmåne (Warner Music Norway)

With Rita Eriksen

- 1988: Back From Wonderland (Desperado Records)

With Egil Eldøen

- 1988: Here We Go Again (Sonet Records)

With Fra Lippo Lippi

- 1989: The Colour Album (The Record Station)
- 2011: Fra Lippo Lippi (Rune Arkiv), Compilation

With Dag Lauvland

- 1989: 1 Step Closer (WEA)

With Hans-Inge Fagervik

- 1989: Painted Pictures (My Own Records)

With Hanne Krogh

- 1989: Hanne (Sonet Records)

With a-ha

- 1990: East of the Sun, West of the Moon (Warner Bros. Records)
- 1993: Memorial Beach (Warner Bros. Records)
- 2000: Minor Earth Major Sky (Warner Bros. Records)

With Dag Kolsrud

- 1990: December (RCA Records)

With Bjørn Eidsvåg

- 1990: Tatt Av Vinden (Norsk Plateproduksjon)

With Lynni Treekrem

- 1991: Ut I Vind (Columbia Records)

With Morten Harket

- 1992: Poetenes Evangelium (Kirkelig Kulturverksted)

With Yellow Pages

- 1992: Her Story (EMI Records)

With Animal Farm

- 1994: Animal Farm (Norsk Plateproduksjon)

With Anne Grimstad Fjeld

- 2000: Tein (Anchi Litt Av Hvert...)

With Svein Tang Wa

- 2005: På Kanten (Trembling Records)

With Jonnys Daughter

- 2005: Happy Blue Year (Nobel Records)

With Kristin Sevaldsen & The Millionairs

2011: Transit (d'Label Records)
