= Kåre Kolve =

Norwegian jazz saxophonist

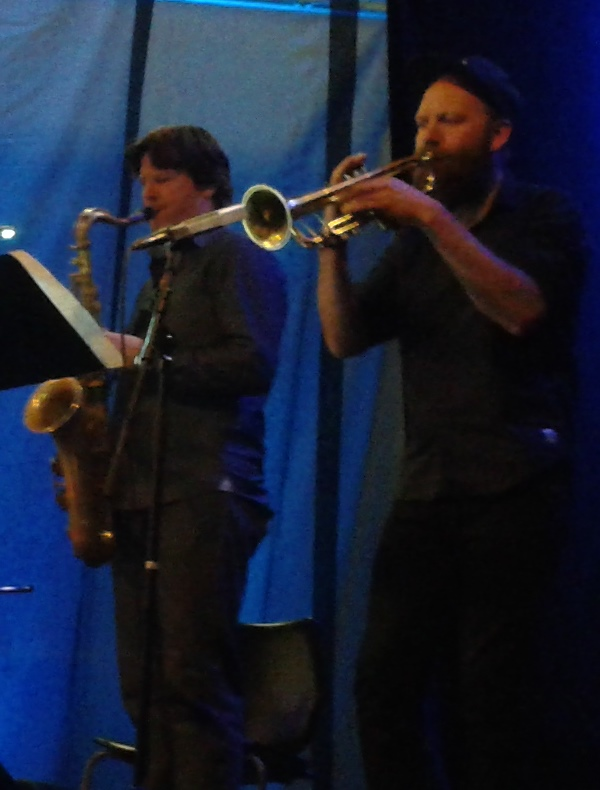
- Kolve's Interactions including with Mathias Eick at Vossajazz 2016.

Background information
- Born: 10 August 1967 (age 59); Voss Municipality, Hordaland, Norway
- Origin: Norway
- Genres: Jazz
- Occupations: Musician, band leader, composer
- Instrument: Saxophone
- Website: kaarekolve.no

Kåre Kolve (born 10 August 1964) is a Norwegian jazz musician (saxophone), and the older brother of the vibraphonist Ivar Kolve. He is known as bandleader of his own Kåre Kolve Quartet, several album releases and the collaborations within the bands "Lava", "Mezzoforte" and "Tre Små Kinesere".

== Career ==
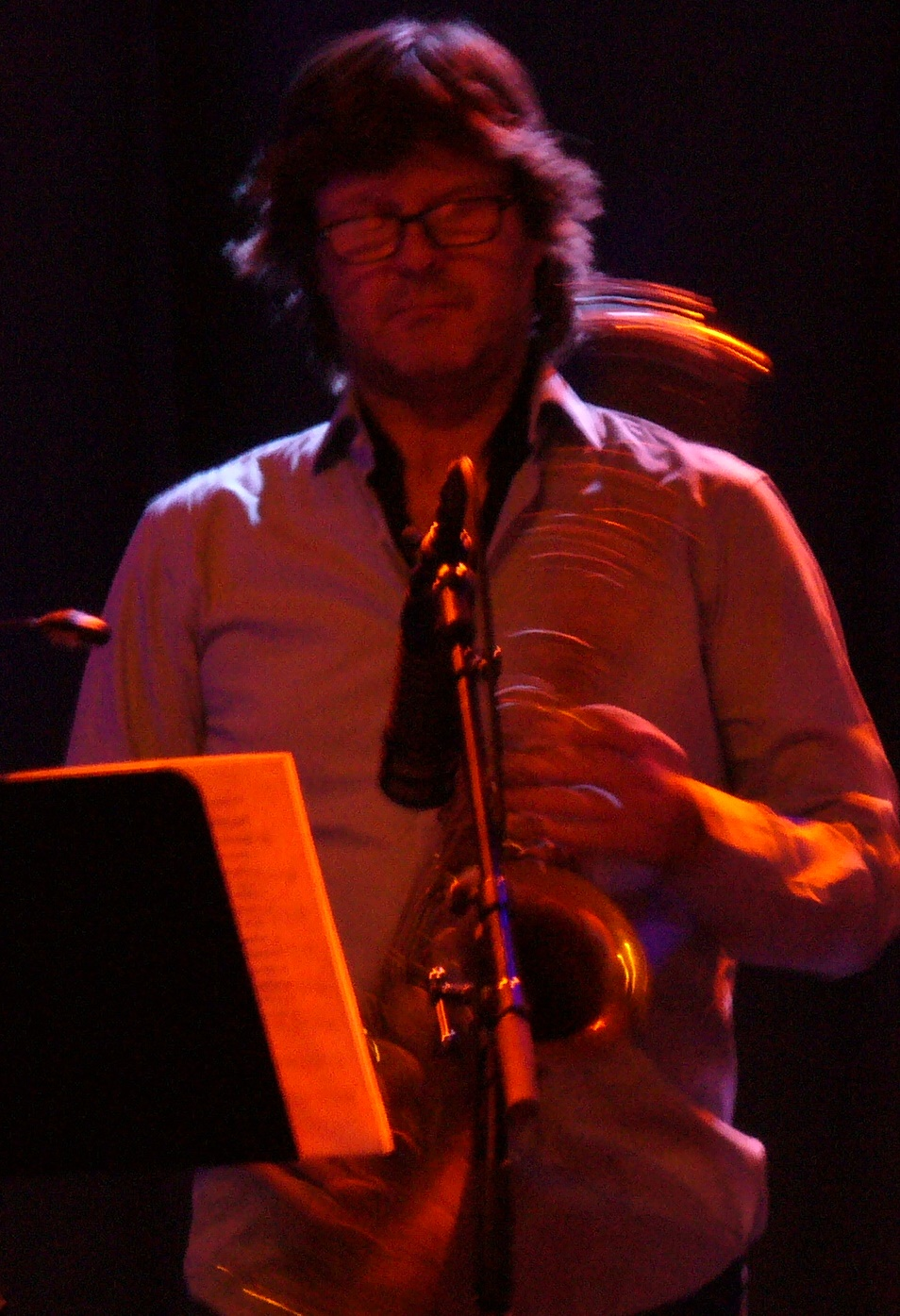
Kåre Kolve at Vossajazz 2014.

After a year at Trøndertun Folkehøgskole, Kolve studied music on the Jazz program at Trondheim Musikkonsevatorium (1984–87), where he participated in "Trondheim Bop-service" and "First Set" releasing the album Going (1992). He is known from long time collaboration within the Norwegian jazz rock band "Lava", including four album releases, and the Icelandic jazz rock band "Mezzoforte" (1991–95), including the albums Fortissimos (1991) and Daybreak (1993). He is one of the driving forces of the band "Mambo Compañeros" together with Marit Hætta Øverli in Trondheim (1996–), including the album Viva Salsa (2003). Kolve has appeared on releases such as Innerst i sjelen (1994) with Sissel Kyrkjebø, Marit Hætta Øverli and Ole Edvard Antonsen, and he led his own Kåre Kolve Quartet with Espen Berg, including two releases.

At Vossajazz 2014, he appeared within the Polyostinat experience, by his brother Ivar Kolve. Together they performed within a team of Norwegian musicians, including Jørn Øien, Ellen Andrea Wang and last but not the least Jarle Vespestad. They delivered a poly rhythmic and poly harmonic treat for the discerning ear.

== Honors ==
- 2015: Commission Interactions for the Vossajazz and Trondheim Jazz Festival

== Discography (in selection) ==
=== Solo albums ===
As Kåre Kolve Quartet including Espen Berg (piano), Jo Fougner Skaansar (bass) and Magnus Forsberg (drums)

- 2009: My Direction (Curling Legs)
- 2010: Further Directions (Curling Legs)

Commission for Vossajazz including with Mathias Eick, Per Oddvar Johansen, Espen Berg, Ivar Kolve, and Anders Jormin

- 2017: Interactions (Curling Legs), live at the 2015 Vossajazz

=== Collaborative works ===
With Terje Tysland

- 1988: Kainn Æ Få Lov (Plateselskapet)

Within "Lava»

- 1990: The Rhythm of Love (Mercury)
- 1996: The Very Best of Lava (Polydor), Compilation
- 2005: Alibi (Tylden & Co)
- 2009: Symphonic Journey (Tylden & Co)

Within "First Set»

- 1992: Going

Within "Mezzoforte»

- 1991: Fortissimos (RCA), Compilation
- 1991: Better Love (RCA)
- 1994: After Hours (ZYX Music)
- 1994: Daybreak (CNR Music)

With Frank and Rita Eriksen

- 1994: The Water Is Wide (BMG, Norway)

Within "Tre Små Kinesere»

- 1996: Tro Håp & Kjærlighet (Columbia)
- 1998: Storeslem (Columbia)

Within "Postgirobygget»

- 1996: Essensuell (Norske Gram)

Within "Trondheim Storband»

- 2002: Urban Lazy (Not on Label)

Within "Mambo Compañeros»

- 2003: Viva Salsa

With Espen Lind

- 2008: Army of One (BMG, Norway)

With Annjo K. Greenall

- 2012: Eg Vandrar Langs Kaiane (Øra Fonogram)
