= Herodes Falsk =

Norwegian actor, comedian and songwriter

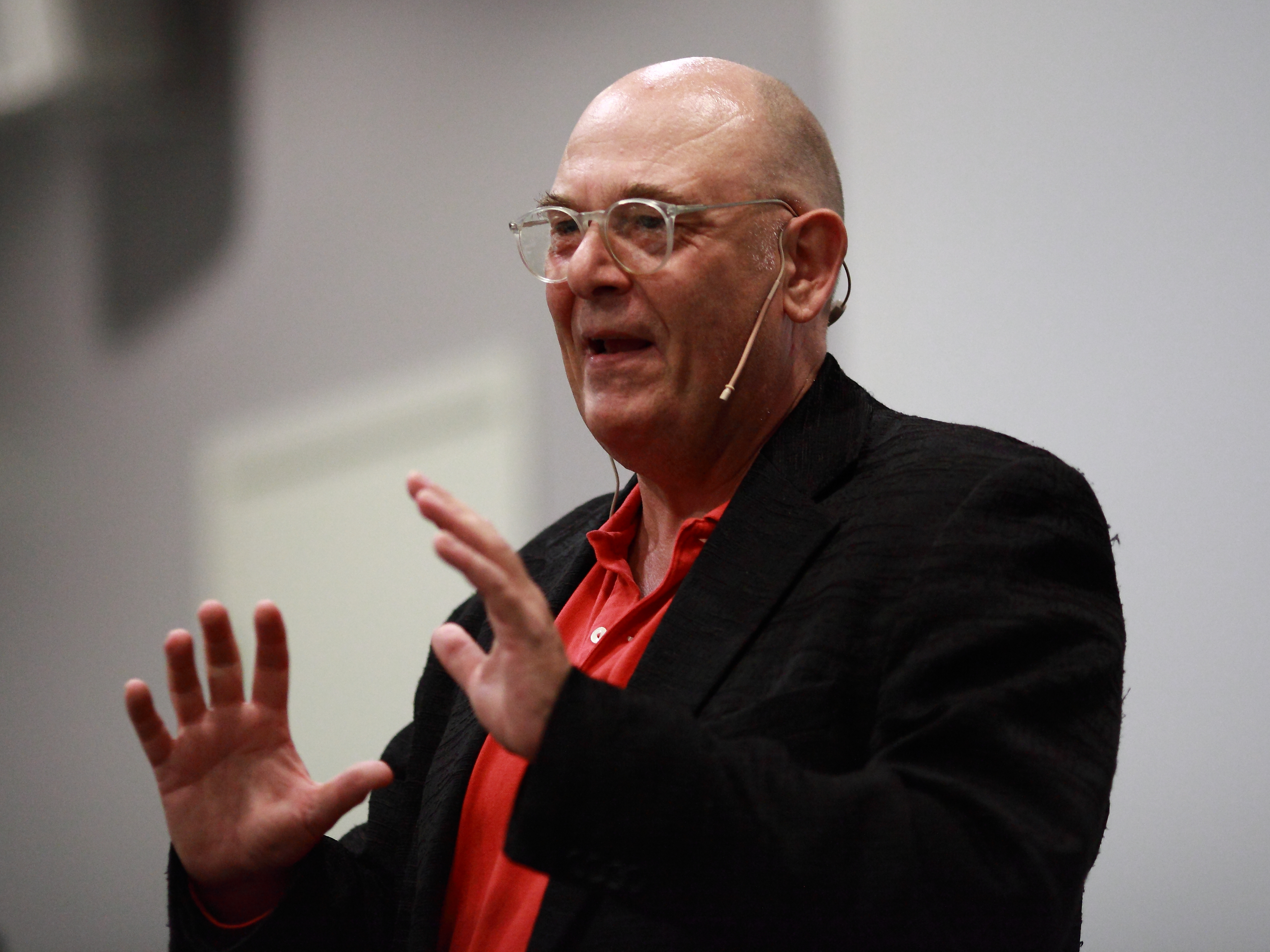
- Herodes Falsk in performance, 2011

Background information
- Born: 9 July 1954 (age 70)
- Origin: Drammen, Norway
- Genres: stand-up comedy, sketch comedy, comedy music
- Occupation(s): Comedian, songwriter, actor
- Years active: 1969–present
- Website: falsk.no

Kim Bård Hansen (born 9 July 1954), better known by his stage name Herodes Falsk, is a Norwegian comedian, actor, author, and songwriter. Falsk is probably best known for his work with the musical comedy trio Prima Vera alongside Jahn Teigen and Tom Mathisen, and for his longtime collaboration with Mathisen after Prima Vera's breakup in 1984. He is also often credited as Norway's first stand-up comedian.

== Early career (1969–1976) ==
Kim Hansen was born and grew up in Drammen. His career in showbusiness began at age 15 when he in late 1969 became friends with Terje Jensen, a young guitarist and songwriter also from Drammen. The two shared a similar musical taste, listening to artists like Jethro Tull, Captain Beefheart, Frank Zappa and Led Zeppelin. Jensen also played in a local rock band called Frosk, and Hansen became the band's manager and roadie.

It was during this time Kim Hansen became Herodes Falsk. According to his autobiography, when reading a short newspaper story about Frosk in 1972, he realized that the band and its members were "too average", looking like regular long-haired boys with ordinary names, and that an image change was needed to make it in the music industry. Thus, Terje Jensen began using the stage name Jonas Fjeld, a name he still uses today. Hansen became Herodes Falsk, and the other bandmembers also picked eccentric stage names. Also, the band itself changed its name to Jonas Fjeld Rock n' Rolf Band, and the bandmembers began wearing outrageous outfits on stage. In line with this new image, Falsk would begin joining the band on stage, even though he did not sing or play any instruments, usually dancing around on stage, telling jokes or reading dirty poetry in-between songs as well as various other crazy antics.

The image change seemed to pay dividends, because in 1973 the band got a record deal, and for Falsk, who was still the band's manager, it became much easier to book concert dates. By late 1975, the band had released three albums, but felt they weren't getting enough backing from their record company, and wanted to get fired from their contract. To achieve this, they decided to make an album containing the absolute worst music the guys could imagine, and Falsk was given the task of producing the record, only because he had absolutely no experience in the field. The album was named Endelig! (Uff, ikke nå igjen?) (translated: At Last! (Oh no, not again?)), was recorded in just four days, and featured JFRRB's take on protest songs, disco, football chants, Swedish dansband music, yodeling and every other genre that the band hated – and to everyone's surprise, the album became an overwhelming success, peaking at number 15 on the Norwegian national album chart, and was by far JFRRB's most successful album to date in terms of record sales.

The unexpected success of "Endelig!" saddled JFRRB with the label of being a humor band, which was a label they did not want. Even though JFRRB's concerts had always contained an element of comedy, Jonas Fjeld and the other members regarded themselves as serious musicians, so in order to distance themselves from the humor band label, they dropped the silly stage costumes and "Rock n' Rolf" from its name and became the Jonas Fjeld Band. No longer required to perform clownery on stage, Falsk left the band in 1976 to pursue other projects.

== Prima Vera (1976–1984) ==
After leaving Jonas Fjeld Band, Falsk hooked up with his childhood friend Tom Mathisen. Together they wrote a collection of comedy sketches and humorous songs in the summer of 1976, and were later joined by former Popol Vuh singer Jahn Teigen whom Falsk had become friends with on the road. Both Mathisen and Teigen were accomplished musicians, and although Falsk was no musician himself, he had in his own words become a half-decent songwriter during his years with the Jonas Fjeld Band. Falsk, Teigen and Mathisen also shared a common sense of absurd humor, and decided to form the musical comedy group Prima Vera.

=== Early years ===
Prima Vera performed together for the first time in October 1976, and toured extensively for the next year. Prima Vera's comedy shows contained a mix of sketches, music performed by Teigen and Mathisen, and monologues performed by Falsk. They also became famous for their silly costumes and their trademark lime green tights which they wore at all times on stage, as well as during most of their other public appearances. Their self-titled debut album Prima Vera was released in September 1977, and although it failed to make the charts, it sold well enough that the guys decided to make a follow-up album the next year. One of the songs recorded for the debut album was a song called "Arne Belinda", which was a mock version of "Anna Lovinda", a song recorded several years earlier by TV host Erik Bye, with different lyrics. However, as the song's original composer, Bye refused to allow Prima Vera the right to use the song on their album. Annoyed by this, Falsk included "Arne Belinda" on the debut album's track list, with the line "Censored by Erik Bye" written underneath.

For their 1978 follow-up album, Brakara, Prima Vera decided to include "Arne Belinda" anyway, by slightly altering the song's melody so that Erik Bye could no longer be credited as composer. This move gave Prima Vera much publicity ahead of the release, and with rumors of Bye going to court to have the album stopped, people flocked to the music stores to secure a copy before the album was withdrawn from the market, and to hear what the fuss was all about. As a result, Brakara sold 130,000 copies in Norway, went platinum, and reached the top of the album chart, where it remained in the top five for 13 weeks. The rumored lawsuit from Erik Bye never came, but in his 2004 autobiography Falsk credits the "Arne Belinda" debacle as the single-biggest reason Brakara topped the charts, claiming this was "the kind of publicity you couldn't buy with all the money in the world", and helped make Prima Vera a national phenomenon.

In 1979, Prima Vera released their third album Salmer og sanger vi gjerne hiver, which stayed in the charts for 11 weeks, peaking at #2, only beaten by Pink Floyd's The Wall. In-between their work with Prima Vera, Teigen also had a solo career as a more serious artist (at least compared to Prima Vera), and Falsk wrote many songs for the Teigen albums Teigen's Tivoli (1977), This Year's Loser (1978), En dags pause (1979) and Mentalkrem (1980), with the latter two albums reaching the top of the Norwegian album chart.

=== Later years ===
Prima Vera's fourth album The Best of Ebba, released in 1980, was a compilation album containing the band's greatest hits plus one new song. It did not make the charts. However, the band's fifth release, 1981's Prima Vera den 5'te provided more success, spurred on by another controversy. The original album cover had a superimposed image of Teigen, Falsk and Mathisen standing behind King Olav V, Crown Princess Sonja and Queen Elizabeth II. Even though the image itself was quite innocent, with no evidence that any member of Norway's royal family was ever offended by the picture, the band was forced to withdraw the album from the market, and re-release it with a different cover. Of course, Prima Vera milked this controversy for all it was worth, and the album peaked at #2 in the charts, spending 16 weeks in the Top 20.

Prima Vera's sixth and final studio album was Ha Ha He He Ho (De gærne har det godt), which was released in September 1982. The album did not sell quite as well as the previous records, peaking at #7 in the charts, and in 1983, the band went on hiatus as Teigen wanted to focus on his solo career. Falsk wrote the Teigen songs "Adieu" (1982) and "Do Re Mi" (1983), which Teigen performed in the Eurovision Song Contest, the former in duet with Teigen's future wife Anita Skorgan. However, with Teigen wanting to become a more "serious" artist, the relationship between Falsk and Teigen was becoming strained. They had several arguments during the recording of Teigen and Skorgan's 1983 album Cheek to Cheek, which Falsk co-produced, and went on to spend six weeks at #1 in the Norwegian charts.

In addition to their albums and touring with their music/comedy shows, Prima Vera also made two musicals, both written by Falsk. The first was Fantomets glade bryllup (The Phantom's happy wedding) which was performed on Centralteateret in Oslo in 1978, and became a box office success despite lukewarm reviews. The second musical was named Fisle Narrepanne i Tyrol and was performed at Centralteateret in 1981. Both musicals heavily featured Prima Vera's own brand of humor and silliness. They also made a film which premiered in the summer of 1983 called Prima Vera og soga om Olav den hellige (Prima Vera and the saga of Olav the holy). The film received generally poor reviews, and many critics viewed it as a rip-off of Monty Python and the Holy Grail.

=== Breakup ===
Falsk and Mathisen had little contact with Teigen in 1984 as Teigen and Anita Skorgan toured extensively in Norway and Sweden to support the Cheek to Cheek album – but in November 1984, Teigen contacted Falsk and Mathisen, and asked them to join him for a series of shows in Stockholm. Even before the shows, the climate between Teigen and the other two Prima Vera members was poor. With little time for rehearsals, they decided to perform basically the same show they had performed in Oslo two years earlier, with only minor adaptations for the Swedish audience. The show was a disaster, and was followed by a bitter argument backstage. The same night, Falsk and Mathisen returned to Norway without even saying goodbye, and with that Prima Vera was history. In his autobiography, Falsk writes that he never spoke to Teigen again for the next 15 years.

== After Prima Vera (1984–present) ==
During Prima Vera's hiatus in early 1984, Falsk toured Norway with a solo stand-up comedy show. Prima Vera's shows had always had a certain element of toilet humor in their material, but for his solo act, Falsk got even dirtier. Falsk's solo act was described by some critics as vulgar and obscene, but in spite of this, or maybe because of it, the show was a big hit with the fans. The show was also recorded and released as an album, called Born in Drammen, which is believed to be the first ever stand-up comedy album released in Norway. The album title is a reference to Bruce Springsteen's Born in the USA, which topped the charts in Norway at the time, and the album cover is an almost exact copy of the Born in the USA cover, except that Falsk is not wearing jeans or even underpants on the picture. After the Prima Vera breakup, Falsk did another comedy tour in 1985, and released a second comedy album called Falskboy, which also contained a few songs by Tom Mathisen.

=== Falsk/Mathisen ===
In late 1985, Falsk and Mathisen resumed their partnership, and released the video Sammen er vi som et hardkokt egg, which contained a series of new sketches, and later the same year the duo released the album Viggo & Reidar synger julen inn (Jul i containeren), a parody of Christmas albums. In October 1986, Falsk and Mathisen returned to the theatre for their first show since the Prima Vera breakup, called Fusk, and for once they received mostly positive reviews. In 1987, Falsk and Mathisen released the album Hubaluba, which was followed by a tour in 1988. Shortly before Christmas, they also released the album Tidligere utgitt på alvor (Previously released seriously), where they performed mock versions of previously released songs by mainstream artists like Arne Bendiksen, Rune Rudberg, and their former bandmate Jahn Teigen.

In 1989, Falsk and Mathisen wrote and created the film Showbiz, where Falsk played the movie's protagonist, a loser obsessed with becoming a pop star, while Mathisen played six different supporting roles. According to Falsk, he and Mathisen were determined to break every screenwriting rule and ignore every film cliché when writing the script. Falsk also directed the film, which was slaughtered by the critics after its premiere in September 1989, and bombed at the box office. Nonetheless, Showbiz has become something of a cult film in Norway. The duo's next project, the television show Tom Mathisen og Herodes Falsks latterlige verden (The ridiculous world of Tom Mathisen and Herodes Falsk), which aired on the cable channel TVNorge, was more successful. The TV show was basically an extension of Falsk/Mathisen's live act and featured sketches, songs, television parodies and bits of Falsk's stand-up material.

In September 1990, Falsk/Mathisen released their most successful album Fylla har skylda, which reached #7 in the album chart. The album's title track was also released as a single, and the following year, Falsk/Mathisen took Fylla har skylda to the stage, and performed a series of sold-out shows at the prestigious Chat Noir revue theatre in Oslo, followed by a tour. In 1992, they wrote a new show, Tar'n helt ut, which also sold out Chat Noir, and created a second TV series, called Sen lunch.

In 1993, the duo released the album To grunner til å ikke ha sex i kveld, which peaked at #10 in the charts, and was followed by a Chat Noir show in 1994. In early 1995, Falsk went solo and toured Norway with his stand-up comedy show Sånn er jeg, og det er du også which became a huge success. At the end of the tour, Falsk took his show to Chat Noir, where it became the first one-man show ever performed at the scene. After performing for sold-out audiences throughout the summer of 1995, Falsk reunited with Mathisen to create the TV series Nådeløs kveldskos, which introduced some of Falsk/Mathisen's most memorable characters, like the drunken Sami chef Ante Valente, the spaced-out hippie Donovan Østby, and disco singers Børre & Gibb. They also released a disco album in character as Børre & Gibb in late 1995, while an album of Falsk's solo show Sånn er jeg, og det er du også was released in February 1996.

After taking most of 1996 off, Falsk/Mathisen returned in 1997 with the album Chili Kick and the TV show Høy puls, which aired on TV3 and included Falsk experimenting with jazz poetry. In 1998, they continued to explore new genres by creating and starring in the sit-com Piker, vin og sang. However, the show was cancelled after one season. Then, in the summer of 1999 they toured with the show Det æ'kke lett å være hann which was described as a stand-up musical, where Falsk did most of the talking with his stand-up routine, while Mathisen played guitar in the backing band.

=== Prima Vera reunion ===
After Prima Vera's breakup in 1984, Herodes Falsk and Jahn Teigen did not speak to each other for 15 years. Even when a compilation album of the band's greatest hits called Absolute Prima Vera was released in 1994, Teigen and Falsk/Mathisen held separate press conferences to promote the album. However, in 1999, after the funeral of their mutual friend, guitarist Marius Müller who died in a car accident, Teigen and Falsk talked for the first time since the breakup, and cleared the air. In March 2000, at a memorial concert for Müller exactly one year after his death, Prima Vera performed for the first time in 18 years at Rockefeller in Oslo.

In September 2000, Prima Vera returned to the stage with the show Prima Vera (a)Live, and performed 26 sold-out shows at Sentrum Scene in Oslo, followed by a short tour in early 2001. With the exception of a sketch featuring Falsk's Ante Valente character, the guys did not write any new material for the reunion show, but performed their most popular material from the old days. Prima Vera also reunited for a one-off Christmas show at Oslo Spektrum in November 2001.

=== Recent projects ===
Following the Prima Vera reunion, Falsk again went solo, and performed the stand-up show En gentleman fra Drammen at Scene West in Oslo during the summer of 2001. The following summer, he did a new solo show called Sommer, sol og krig at the same venue. In 2003, Falsk/Mathisen reunited and added Alex Rosén as a third member, and created the show Credo Zeppo which they also claimed was a new religion. The show made fun of organized religion and was, like Falsk's previous solo shows, performed at Scene West. However, the show was cancelled after one week following bad reviews and poor ticket sales.

In 2005, Falsk wrote his autobiography De gærne har det godt (It's good to be crazy), where he writes about his experiences during his many years in show business, and in December 2006, Falsk/Mathisen reunited once again to perform a one-off show at Sentrum Scene, which was followed by a short tour in early 2007. In recent years, Falsk has begun a second career as a public speaker, and has been hired in this capacity by many of Norway's largest companies. He has also continued his writing career by releasing the crime novel Elsk din neste in 2009.

== Discography ==
Jonas Fjeld Rock n' Rolf Band

- Jonas Fjeld Rock n' Rolf Band (1973)
- The Best of JFRRB (1974)
- Pans fløyte (1974)
- Endelig! (Uff, ikke nå igjen?) (1975)

Prima Vera

- Prima Vera (1977)
- Brakara (1978)
- Salmer og sanger vi gjerne hiver (1979)
- The Best of Ebba (1980)
- Prima Vera den 5'te (1981)
- Ha Ha He He Ho (De gærne har det godt) (1982)

Herodes Falsk (solo)

- Born in Drammen (1984)
- Falskboy (1985)
- Sånn er jeg... og det er du også (1996)

Tom Mathisen & Herodes Falsk

- Viggo og Reidar synger julen inn (Jul i containeren) (1985)
- Hubaluba (1987)
- Showbiz (1988)
- Tidligere utgitt på alvor (1988)
- Fylla har skylda (1990)
- Alle fine damer har ei stygg venninne (1991)
- To grunner til å ikke ha sex i kveld (1993)
- Børre & Gibbs Happy 52 minutter (1995)
- Funky Fisk (1995)
- Chili Kick (1997)
- Credo Zeppo (2003)

== Filmography ==
- Prima Vera og soga om Olav den hellige (1983)
- Showbiz (1989)
