= Lava (band) =

Norwegian jazz-rock band

- Origin: Årdal, Norway
- Genres: Pop, jazz
- Years active: 1977–present
- Label: Polydor Records
- Members: Svein Dag Hauge; Ole Petter Hansen Chylie; Johannes Hetland; Jonny Sjo; Kåre Kolve
- Past members: Sigurd Køhn; Rolf Graf; Geir Langslet; Stein Eriksen; Kjell Hestetun; Per Kolstad; Per Hillestad

Lava (established 1977 in Årdal Municipality, Norway) is a Norwegian jazz-rock band, known from a series of recordings in the 1980s (Polydor Records).

== Career ==
The initiators Per Hillestad (drums), Svein Dag Hauge (guitar) were joined by Kjell Hestetun (bass) and Stein Eriksen (keyboards) and released the jazz funk influenced album Lava (1980), with contributions from Geir Langslet (keyboards) and Olav Stedje (vocals).

When Hestetun and Eriksen left the band, the quartet Hauge, Hillestad and Langslet and bassist Rolf Graf continued releasing the album Cruisin (1981), with contributions by Per Kolstad (piano), Sigurd Køhn (saxophone) and Marius Müller (guitar), and the track «Take Your Time» became Norway and Europe hit.

Their third album was Prime Time (1982) with Egil Eldøen as new vocalist accompanied by Sidsel Endresen on one track. In addition to the regular lineup, Per Kolstad and Sigurd Køhn contributed on this album. It was followed by a tour with Randy Crawford (1983), also contributing on the album Fire (1984). This is Lavas best-selling albums and it was awarded Spellemannsprisen (1984) in the class Pop.

Later, the group released Prime Cuts (1985), Rhythm of Love (1990) and The Very Best of Lava (1996). On the next two albums Polarity (2003) and Alibi (2005), Geir Langslet was substituted by Stein Austrud (keyboards) Kåre Kolve contributed as saxophonist. The last album Symphonic Journey (2009) was recorded live with Kringkastingsorkestret at Rockefeller. Lava also collaborated with guest artists like Randy Crawford.

== Band members ==
Present members

- Svein Dag Hauge - guitar (1977-)
- Per Hillestad - drums & percussion (1977-)
- Rolf Graf - bass (1980-)
- Per Kolstad - piano (1982-1989, 2003-)

Associated members

- Stein Austrud - keyboards (2003-)
- Kåre Kolve - saxophone (1990-)
- Eythor Gunnarsson - keyboards (1990-)

Past members

- Kjell Hestetun - bass (1980-)
- Stein Eriksen - keyboards (1980-)
- Egil Eldøen - vocals (1982-)
- Sigurd Køhn - saksofon (1982-1989, 2003-2004)
- Marius Müller - guitar (1980-1981)
- Geir Langslet - keyboards (1980-2003)

Guest vocalists

- Sidsel Endresen
- Randy Crawford

== Honors ==
- 1984: Spellemannprisen in the class Pop

== Discography ==
=== Studio albums ===
Title	Album details	Peak chart positions
Title	Album details	NOR
Lava	Released: 1980; Label: Polydor (#2382104)	—
Cruisin	Released: 1981; Label: Polydor (#2382120)	7
Prime Time	Released: 1982; Label: Polydor (#2382134)	6
Fire	Released: 1984; Label: Polydor (#821631)	2
The Rhythm of Love	Released: 1990; Label: Mercury (#842682)	6
Polarity	Released: 2003; Label: Tylden & Co (#GTACD8200)	24
Alibi	Released: 2005; Label: Tylden & Co (#GTACD8239)	—
Water	Released: 2019; Label: Beatstone (#NOA1Z1909)	—
"—" denotes items that did not chart or were not released in that territory.

=== Compilation albums ===
Title	Album details	Peak chart positions
Title	Album details	NOR
Prime Cuts	Released: 1985; Label: Polydor (#825462)	—
The Very Best of Lava	Released: 1996; Label: Polydor (#533035)	17
"—" denotes items that did not chart or were not released in that territory.

=== Live albums ===
Title	Album details
Symphonic Journey	Released: 2009; Label: Tylden & Co (#GTACD8462)

Awards
Preceded by The Monroes	Recipient of the Pop Spellemannprisen; 1984	Succeeded by a-ha
