= Rolf Graf =

Rolf Graf may refer to:

- Rolf Graf (cyclist)
- Rolf Graf (musician)
