= Langslet =

Langslet is a Norwegian surname. Notable people with the surname include:

- Geir Langslet (born 1956), Norwegian jazz pianist and band leader
- Lars Roar Langslet (1936–2016), Norwegian politician
