= Tom Mathisen =

Norwegian actor and comedian

Tom Mathisen (born 14 August 1952) is a Norwegian comedian, actor, screenwriter and musician. He usually handles bass, guitar and vocals. He was in the comedy group Prima Vera from 1976 to 1983 along with Jahn Teigen and Herodes Falsk. Later he continued to work with Herodes Falsk on many TV shows and records. He is also known as "Fortelleren" (The Narrator) in the Brødrene Dal series.

== Performances ==
In addition to solo appearances with guitar and vocals, Mathisen has performed in several groups:

- Tom Mathisen & Herodes Falsk - vocals, guitar, bass
- Prima Vera - vocals, guitar, bass
- Snu - vocals, bass, guitar, mandolin, harmonica
- Viggo og Reidar - guitar, vocals and several other instruments
- Credo Zeppo - vocals
- Mulens Portland Combo - jazz guitar
