= Eriksen (duo) =

Norwegian musical duo

Eriksen is a Norwegian duo consisting of siblings Rita Eriksen and Frank Eriksen both musicians and on vocals. The duo plays music in the roots, country, blues and folk genres.

== Career ==
Eriksen was formed in 1989 and has released a series of studio albums, the first two with English lyrics. Their debut album Two Blue received the Norwegian Grammy Award 1992 in roots and country music.

They have collaborated with several artists, including the American blues musician Delbert McClinton who sang a duet with Rita Eriksen on the song "Movin' Time" written by Jeff Wasserman and Torstein Flakne on the album Two Blue. Eriksen sold 170,000 albums combined.

Sony BMG released the compilation album Eriksen - De aller beste (The very best) in the spring of 2009. The album was heavily promoted by television campaign, reached #1 in the Norwegian albums chart and went platinum.

== Members ==
=== Rita Eriksen ===
Rita Eriksen (born May 26, 1966 in Sola) besides being a member of a duo ia also a famous solo artist in the same genres. She has recorded a number of albums notably Tideland (1996) together with the Irish singer Dolores Keane and The Cardigans, Hjerteslag (2008) and Øyeblikk (2014). Rita Eriksen is also a member of vocal group Queen Bees with Anita Skorgan and Hilde Heltberg.

=== Frank Eriksen ===
Frank Eriksen (born 1961 in Sola Municipality, Norway) is a Norwegian guitarist and singer. In addition to his membership in the duo, he is a member of the Irish-inspired band The Tramps since 2000.

== Discography ==
=== Studio albums ===
Year	Album	Peak positions	Certification
Year	Album	NOR	Certification
1992	Two Blue	8	
1994	The Water is Wide	6	
1995	Alt vende tebage	3	
1998	Blåmandag	40	

=== Eriksen Compilation Albums ===
Year	Album	Peak positions	Certification
Year	Album	NOR	Certification
2009	De aller beste	1	

=== Rita Eriksen discography ===
Refer to Rita Eriksen

=== Frank Eriksen (as part of The Tramps) ===
- 2000: Halfway to the Moon
- 2002: Roadkill (live album)
- 2004: Best of the Tramps (compilation album)
