= Helge Gaarder =

- Born: 25 November 1953; Oslo, Norway
- Died: 15 April 2004 (aged 50)
- Occupations: Singer, composer, journalist and producer
- Parent: Inger Margrethe Gaarder
- Relatives: Jostein Gaarder (brother)

Helge Gaarder (25 November 1953 – 15 April 2004) was a Norwegian singer, composer, journalist and producer.

Gaarder was born in Oslo to children's writer Inger Margrethe Gaarder, and was a brother of Jostein Gaarder. He was a member of various musical groups, including the anarchist band Geitost, the punk band Kjøtt, the experimental band Montasje, and the rock band Cirkus Modern. In 1984 he issued the solo album Eine keine Angst Musik. Gaarder was also journalist for the music magazine Puls, was part of the project Forente Artister, and worked as producer for Concerts Norway.

== Musical career ==
Gaarder joined several bands, one of them being the anarchist band Geitost, for which he played guitar, piano and provided vocals. In 1979, the band released the single Parkalåt/Imorra Babylon, which sold 500 copies. Two Norwegian companies refused to press the album, so it was released in Sweden.

The same year, Gaarder also become a member of the new wave band Kjøtt. Considered to be one of the first Norwegian new wave bands, Kjøtt released one album (Op., 1981) alongside several EPs and singles in their lifetime. Despise the band's short life span, they are widely considered one of the most influential Norwegian bands of all time, due to both the music itself and the fact that their lyrics were exclusively in Norwegian, which was unusual among local bands at the time.

After leaving Kjøtt, Garrder formed the experimental band Montasje. The band released one album, Presence! in 1982. In 1983, Garrder and the band's drummer, Ola Snortheim, left Montasje to form the rock band Cirkus Modern. They released three albums from 1984-1986 to generally positive acclaim.

In 1984, Gaarder released his first and only solo album, Eine Keine Angst Musik.

In 1985, he participated in Forente Artister, a collection of artists who together released the charity single Sammen for livet. The song and the project received a special award in the 1985 Spellemannsprisen.
