= Steinar Albrigtsen =

Norwegian musician

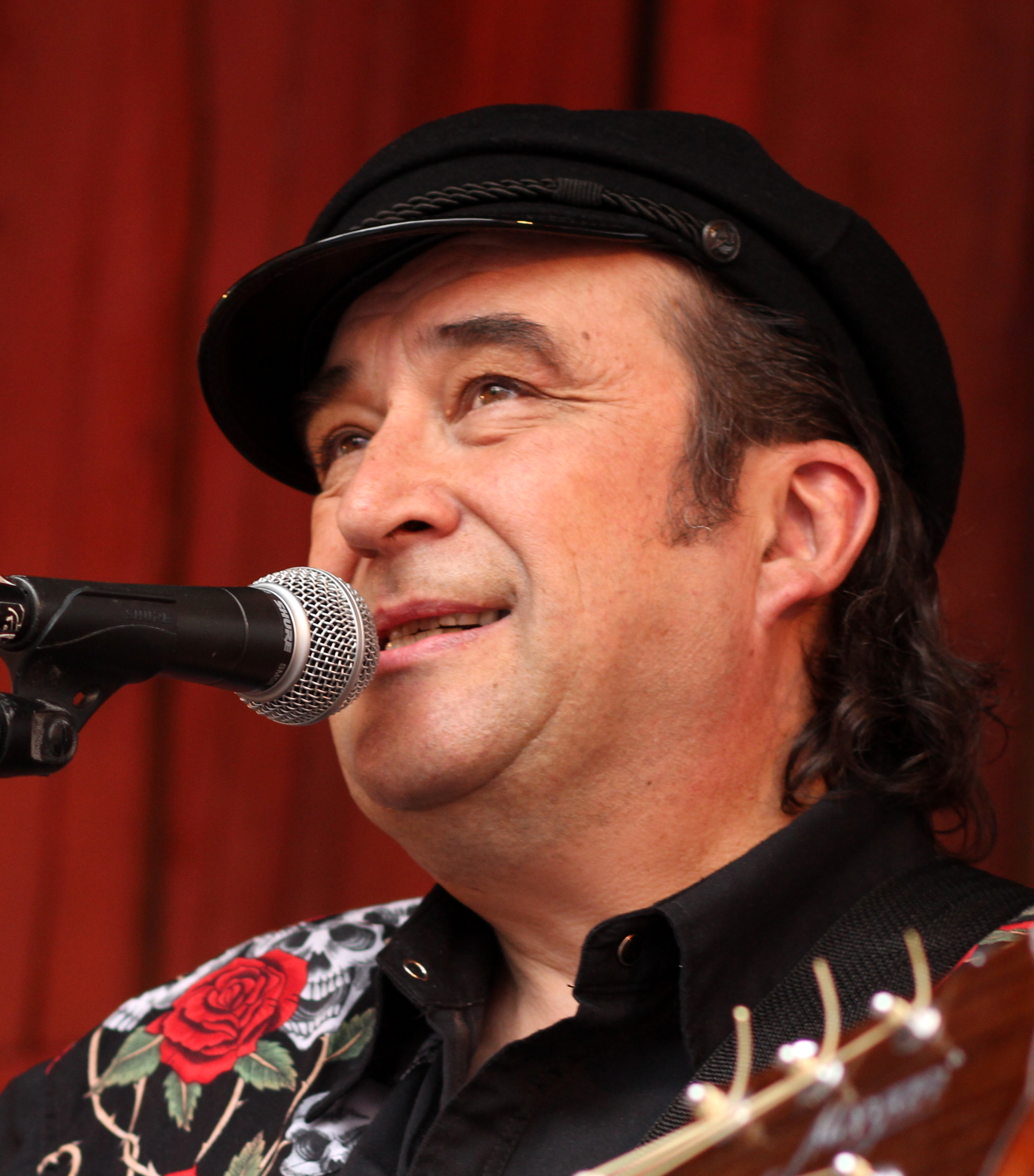
Albrigtsen at Notodden Blues Festival 2013

Steinar Karl Albrigtsen (born 4 January 1957) is a Norwegian singer and guitarist working in the genres country, blues and jazz.

He was born in Hammerfest, but grew up in Tromsdalen, together with Jørn Hoel. Albrigtsen released his album debut Alone Too Long in 1990. It sold 180,000 copies and earned Albrigtsen a Spellemann Award. In 2012 Albrigtsen participated in and won Det store korslaget with Team Steinar from Tromsø.

== Discography ==
- Alone Too Long (1990)
- Bound To Wander (1992)
- Big Storm Coming (1993) – with Tom Pacheco
- The Troubadour (1994)
- Life Is Good (1996)
- Get Together (1997) – with Jørn Hoel
- Nobodies (2000) – with Tom Pacheco
- Stripped (2001)
- Bop 'N Roll (2006) – with the Blue Cats
- Moment Of Peace (2007)
- Bilda fra ei anna tid (2011) – with translated lyrics by Jim Croce
- Sjelevenn (2014) – with Monika Nordli
- The Sailor (2015)
- The Daily Blues (2017)
- The Pacheco Project (2023) – Tom Pacheco tribute album
