= Kari Gjærum =

Norwegian singer (born 1952)

Kari Gjærum (born 23 November 1952 in Porsgrunn) is a Norwegian singer. She was educated at the Østlandets Musikk-konservatorium and Statens Operaskole and has been a professional artist since 1979. She has worked as a singer and backing singer on a number of recordings with other artists, participated in several TV-productions and musicals and shows. She has played leading roles in the Carte Blanche-show Jazzle Dazzle on Victoria Theater in Oslo in 1985 and in the children's musical Alexsander on Chateau Neuf. She played Fantine in Les Misérables on Det Norske Teateret in 1988. She has also worked in shows with artists like Wenche Myhre and Vazelina Bilopphøggers.

Together with Marianne vor Thornburg and Lupe Moe she was a member of the group Chico-Chac which in 1986 released the album Chico-Chac. In 1989 she participated in the Norwegian final of Eurovision Song Contest with the song Barneøyne. She has also appeared as a backing singer several times in the competition, and made a total of 11 appearances in Norway's preselection, the Norsk Melodi Grand Prix, and 5 appearances in the international final. She was a backing singer when Bobbysocks won the Eurovision Song Contest in 1985.
