= Tom Pacheco =

American singer-songwriter

Tomas Pacheco (born November 4, 1946 in New Bedford, Massachusetts) is an American folk singer-songwriter and guitarist. He has collaborated several times with the Norwegian singer and guitarist Steinar Albrigtsen.

== Discography ==
=== Albums ===
- 1965 Turn Away from the Storm
- 1971 Pacheco & Alexander
- 1976 Swallowed Up in the Great American Heartland
- 1976 The Outsider
- 1989 Eagle in the Rain
- 1991 Sunflowers & Scarecrows
- 1992 Tales from the Red Lake
- 1993 Big Storm Comin' (with Steinar Albrigtsen), EU #85, NO #2
- 1994 Luck of Angels
- 1995 Bluefields
- 1997 Woodstock Winter (with members from The Band)
- 1998 Bare Bones & Barbed Wire
- 1999 The Lost American Songwriter (Bare Bones II)
- 2000 Nobodies (with Steinar Albrigtsen), NO #15
- 2002 There Was a Time
- 2003 Year of the Big Wind
- 2005 13 Stones (Bare Bones IV)
- 2005 Rebel Spring
- 2006 Bloodlines
- 2007 The Best of Tom Pacheco, The Secret Hits Vol. 1
- 2008 Railroad Rainbows & Talking Blues
- 2010 I'll Leave a Light for You
- 2011 The Best of Tom Pacheco, The Secret Hits Vol. 2
- 2023 The Pacheco Project (2023) (with Steinar Albrigtsen) – Tom Pacheco tribute album
