= Popol Ace =

1970s Norwegian progressive rock band

- Also known as: Popol Vuh, Arman Sumpe Dur Express
- Origin: Oslo, Norway
- Genres: progressive rock
- Years active: 1972–1978
- Labels: Polydor, Universal, Grappa
- Past members: Jahn Teigen; Pete Knutsen; Arne Schulze; Terje Methi; Thor Andreassen; Pjokken Eide
- Website: Popol Ace

Popol Vuh, later known as Popol Ace, was a 1970s Norwegian progressive rock band from Oslo, that became popular in the 1970s Norwegian rock scene with such songs as "All We Have Is the Past", "Queen of all Queens" and "Music Box". The band was originally a larger jazz-rock inspired act that featured a brass section named Arman Sumpe Dur Express. The horn players left the group and they named the new band Popol Vuh. The band later changed its name to Popol Ace to avoid confusion with the German band Popol Vuh. In 1972 they won Norway's Grammy award, the Spellemannprisen, for the Group category. The band's downfall came with the lead singer Jahn Teigen leaving the band for a solo career.

In 2017 they were inducted into Norway's Rockheim rock music hall of fame. Grappa Musikkforlag released the 3LP box set It Was 50 Years Ago Today on November 11, 2022 featuring live recordings taken from Sveriges Radio and NRK's archives. Sven Ohrvik played keyboards on tracks 11-20. In 2023, French progressive rock label Musea Records reissued Stolen From Time in a remastered version.

== Last line-up ==
- Jahn Teigen – vocals
- Pete Knutsen – guitar, keyboards
- Arne Schulze – guitar
- Terje Methi – bass
- Thor Andreassen – drums and percussion
- Pjokken Eide – flute, trombone

== Honors ==
=== Spellemannsprisen ===
- Spellemannprisen 1972 won in the class Group

=== Other ===
- 2017: Rockheim Hall of Fame inductees

== Discography ==
as Popol Vuh

- 1972 Popol Vuh, Polydor 2923 009
- 1973 Quiche Maya, Polydor 2382 038

as Popol Ace

- 1975 Stolen From Time, Polydor 2480 332
- 1978 Curly Sounds, Polydor 2383 498
- 1994 Cat of 9 Tales, Polydor 523908-2 (compilation)
- 2003 All We Have, Universal/Polydor (albums 1-4 + 5th disc of rarities)
- 2006 The Best of Popol Ace, Universal (compilation)
- 2022 It Was 50 Years Ago Today, Grappa GRLP4748-1 (LP)
- 2023 Stolen From Time, Musea Records FGBG 5067 (CD + LP)

Awards
| Preceded by first recipient | Recipient of the Group Spellemannprisen; 1973 | Succeeded by Saft |
