= Bjøro Håland =

Norwegian country singer (born 1943)

Bjøro Håland (born 6 October 1943) is a Norwegian country singer.

He was born on Håland in the Audnedalen valley of Vest-Agder county, Norway, and grew up with five siblings. In 1960, he emigrated to the United States. He worked as a construction worker and sang in bars. He moved back to Norway in 1966.

== Discography ==
- Diamonds Are Forever (2007)
- Mine Salmer (2004)
- Blue Sky (2000)
- All The Best (1995)
- The Door To My Heart (1995)
- Nashville-Here We Go Again (1990)
- Rett Fra Hjertet (1989)
- By Request (1989)
- Bjøro Håland 87 (1987)
- Bjøro's best (1986)
- Just For You (1984)
- Min Stetson Og Gitar (1984)
- On Tour (1983)
- Mitt Julealbum (1983)
- Bjøro Håland (1982)
- My Nashville Album (1981)
- To My Friends (1980)
