= Gry Jannicke Jarlum =

Norwegian-Swedish singer and author

Gry Jannicke Jarlum in 1981

Gry Jannicke Jarlum (born 6 April 1962 in Oslo) is a Norwegian singer and author, best known for her 1981 album Svake mennesker which was at number one on the VG-lista for 16 weeks. She is also known for her book Du er jeg (1994), about her alleged experience with extraterrestrial life.
