= Randi Hansen =

Norwegian pop singer (born 1958)

Randi Hansen (born 24 November 1958, in Tromsø) is a Norwegian pop singer who formerly lived in Harstad, where she had a background as a music teacher at Heggen videregående skole. She was most active in the 1980s, and is best known for the song "Hvis æ fikk være sola di", which is on her debut album, Ho Randi. This sold 80,000 copies.

She released six solo albums before she took a pause in her career and raised a family, and has worked on twelve other albums. However, in 2008, she came back with a new album: Tid som går.

== Discography ==
- 1979 – Ho Randi
- 1980 – Hjerterdame
- 1981 – Æ undres
- 1982 – Hjæmlandet
- 1983 – Stille natt, Christmas record with Olav Stedje
- 1985 – Ansiktet i speilet
- 2008 – Tid som går
