= Trond-Viggo Torgersen =

Norwegian physician, television host, actor, comedian, singer, songwriter and artist

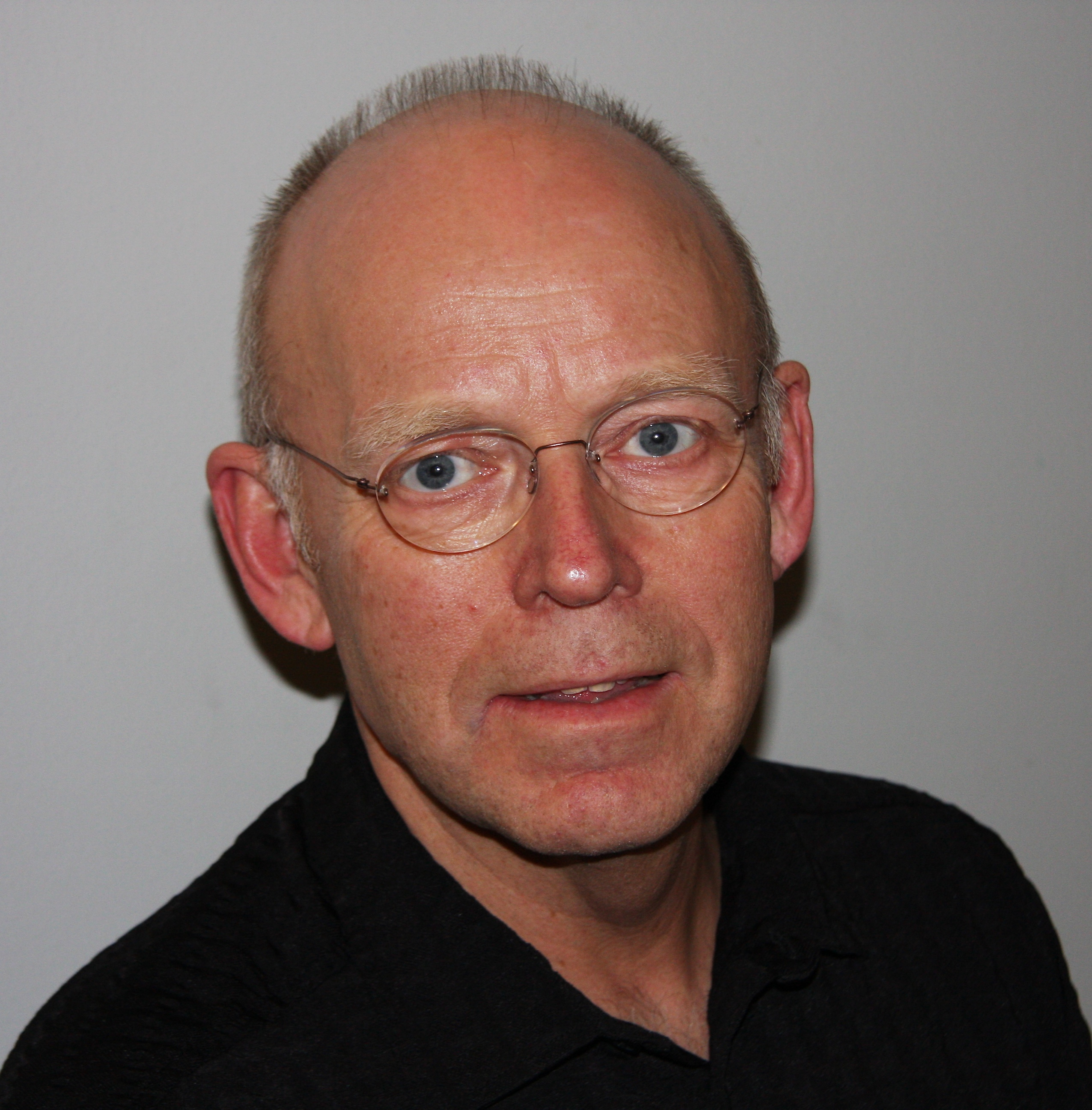
- Torgersen in November 2009; Photo: Bjarne Thune
- Born: 14 June 1952 (age 73); Oslo, Norway
- Spouse: Kristin Helle-Walle

Trond-Viggo Torgersen (born 14 June 1952 in Oslo, Norway) is a Norwegian physician, broadcaster, television host, actor, comedian, singer, songwriter, artist and former children's ombudsman.

== Artistic career ==
Torgersen started in NRK making programs for children and youth, like Flode and Kroppen, and he was the first program host for Halvsju. He has published several children's albums and was awarded Spellemannprisen 1981 in the class Children's music, together with George Keller, for the album Det by'ner nå. Familiar songs like "Tenke sjæl", "Hjalmar", "Slapp reggae", "Stilig" and "Puss, puss, så får du en suss" is signed by Torgersen. He has also written several plays for children and adults. Hjalmar og Flode has been set up on Oslo Nye Teater, Hordaland Teater and Rogaland Teater.

His books Kroppen (The Body), Flode alene (Flode Alone) and Tenke sjæl (approx. To Think for Yourself) have been translated into several languages.

In recent years, he is perhaps best known as a comedian and artist on radio and television, and from concert stages across the country. In Norway he is especially known for the characters «Vaktmester'n», and «Fem på gaten», and had several programs from Samfundet in Trondheim entitled Trond-Viggo og Samfundet.

Torgersen studied medicine, was Norway's second Ombudsman for children, and is now appointed as Head of NOU Ungdommens maktutredning (Youth power survey) for the Barne- og likestillings- og inkluderingsdepartementet (Ministry of Children, Equality and Inclusion). He is married to Kristin Helle-Valle. He currently resides in Bergen.

== The Backing Band ==
- Atle Halstensen - keyboards, accordion and backing vocals
- Mats Grønner – guitars, banjo and backing vocals
- Jens Fossum – bass and backing vocals
- Eirik Andre Rydningen – percussion and backing vocals

Former member

- Bernt Rune Stray – guitars and backing vocals

== Discography ==
=== Albums ===
- Kua med fletter og juret på tvers (1976)
- Harunosågirebort (1977)
- Bare barn er barn (Men alle er vi barnebarn) (1979)
- Eyvind & Trond-Viggo (1979) with Eyvind Solås
- Petter og ulven (1980)
- Det by'ner nå! (1981)
- Trond-Viggo Vol. I (1976-1978) (1992)
- Trond-Viggo Vol. II (1981-1985) (1992)
- Eyvind & Trond-Viggo|Samleplate (1994)
- Trond-Viggos beste (1997)
- Barnetimen for de store (2002)
- De du kan + Noe nytt & Noe rart (2007)

=== Singles ===
- Rappe pølse/pølse (1991) with Trond Kirkvaag
- Body roll (1991) as Vaktmester'n

=== Audiobooks ===
- Hjalmar og flode (2003)
- Tenke sjæl (2007)

== Career Overview ==
- Artist, freelance in NRK 1974–1989
- Doctor and Researcher 1980–1989
- Barneombud 1989–1995
- Advisor for the television director in NRK 1995–1997
- Channel Manager NRK2 1997–1998
- Manager of cultureNRK 1998–2000
- Journalist Entertainment Division NRK 2000–Current
