= One 2 Many =

Norwegian band

- Origin: Norway, Sweden
- Genres: Pop, pop rock
- Years active: 1987–1989
- Labels: A&M Records
- Past members: Dag Kolsrud; Camilla Griehsel; Jan Gisle Ytterdal

One 2 Many was a short-lived Norwegian-Swedish band consisting of Dag Kolsrud (keyboards), Camilla Griehsel (vocals) and Jan Gisle Ytterdal (guitar).

Formed in 1987, the band released their first and only album Mirror on A&M Records in 1988. The Scandinavian pop track "Downtown", was an immediate success in Europe, reaching #1 for five weeks in Norway. In the US, the song was also a success, reaching #37 on the Billboard Hot 100, #18 on the AC chart and #30 on the Dance chart in May 1989. Three further singles were released, namely "Another Man", "Writing on the Wall" and "Nearly There", but while promotion was still underway, the band had already split. Allmusic labels them a candidate for the "least remembered one-hit wonder ever".

Kolsrud went on to join the band Guys in Disguise, after which he pursued a solo career. He was previously a-ha's world tour musical director (1986-1987). Griehsel met British singer Colin Vearncombe (a.k.a. Black) and married him in 1990. She went on to become an opera singer and has lived and performed in London and Cork, Ireland. In 2008, she released an album, Rum and Chocolate.

== Discography ==
=== Album ===
Year	Album	Label	UK Albums Chart	Norway
1988	Mirror	A&M Records	–	3

=== Singles ===
Year	Single	Label	UK Singles Chart	US Hot 100	Norway	Netherlands	Belgium
October 1988	"Downtown"	A&M Records	65		1	29	38
March 1989	"Another Man"	A&M Records	–	–	–	–	-
May 1989	"Downtown" (re-issue)	A&M Records	43	37	–	–	-
August 1989	"Writing on the Wall"	A&M Records	–	–	–	–	-
November 1989	"Nearly There"	A&M Records	–	–	–	–	-
