= Jahn Teigen =

Norwegian singer, musician, and comedian (1949–2020)

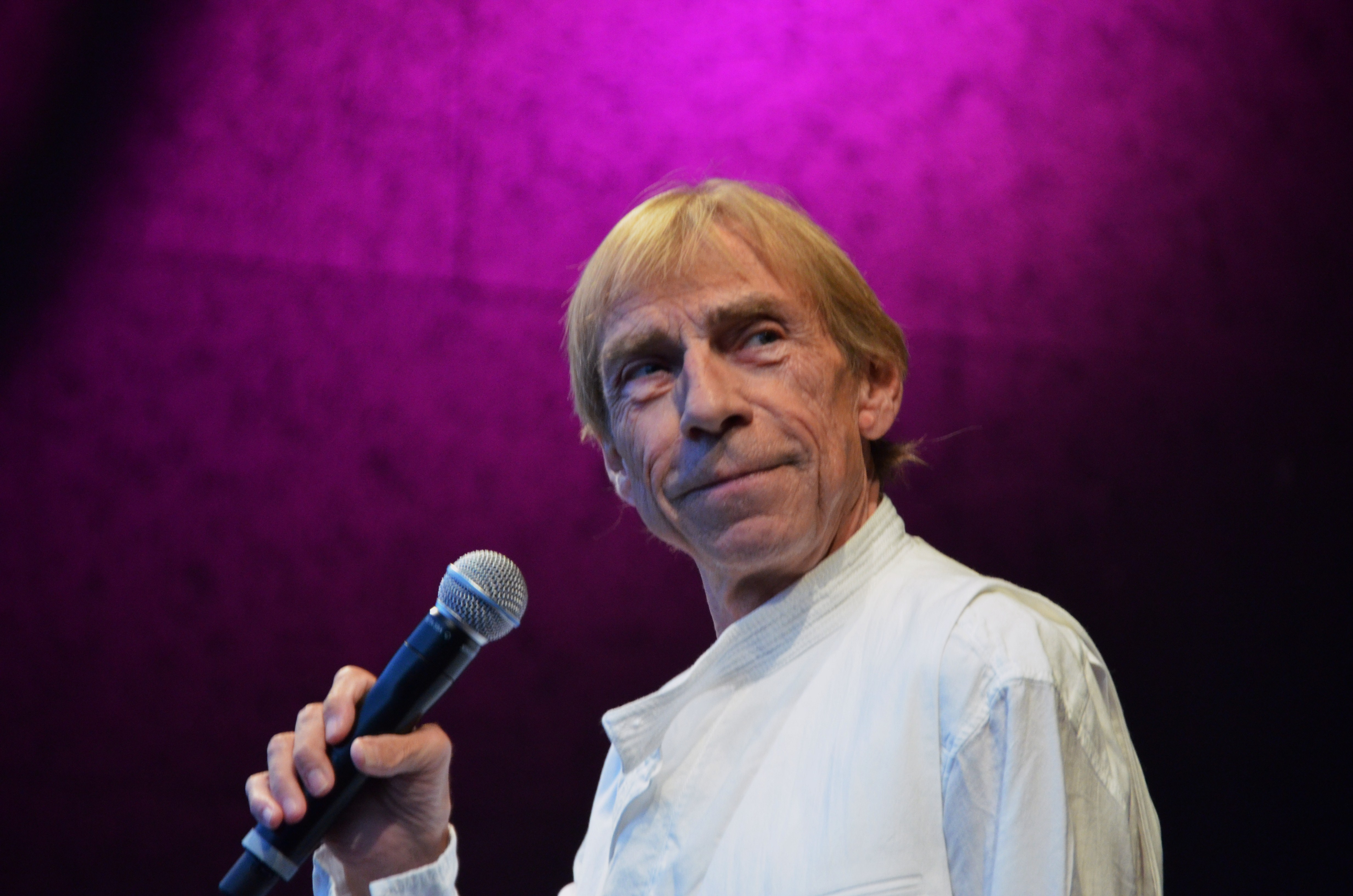
- Jahn Teigen in 2011

Background information
- Born: Jan Teigen; 27 September 1949; Tønsberg, Norway
- Died: 24 February 2020 (aged 70) Ystad, Sweden
- Genres: Pop, rock, comedy rock, progressive rock
- Instruments: Vocals, guitar, bass, percussion
- Years active: 1967–2020

Jahn Teigen (born Jan Teigen; 27 September 1949 – 24 February 2020) was a Norwegian singer, musician and comedian. He represented Norway in the Eurovision Song Contest three times, in 1978, 1982 and 1983, From October 2006 until his death in February 2020, he lived in Sweden.

== Biography ==
=== Popol Vuh ===
Jahn Teigen was born in Tønsberg. He started his career in the late 1960s when he released a few singles and one album with Enemies. However, his commercial breakthrough did not come until the early 1970s as the lead singer of the 6-member rock band Popol Vuh. They released three successful albums, the first self-titled in 1973. Their most popular album was released in 1976, called Stolen From Time, but this time under their new name Popol Ace, to avoid confusion with the German rock band with the same name that also was popular in the 1970s. Popol Vuh is actually a Maya Indian word in the Quiché language, meaning book of the community. Popol Vuh/Popol Ace was actually a refinement of the even-older 8-member group Arman Sumpe Dur Express. During 1971 and the first half of 1972, Arman Sumpe D.E. was on a long-lasting concert tour throughout Norway playing more than 140 concerts. Jahn performed at one of Europe's two largest music festivals, the Roskilde Festival, in 1972, becoming one of the major attractions as part of Popol Vuh (credited as Arman Sumpe). He had previously performed in Roskilde at the Fjordvilla Club in 1968 with the band Red Squares.

=== Prima Vera ===
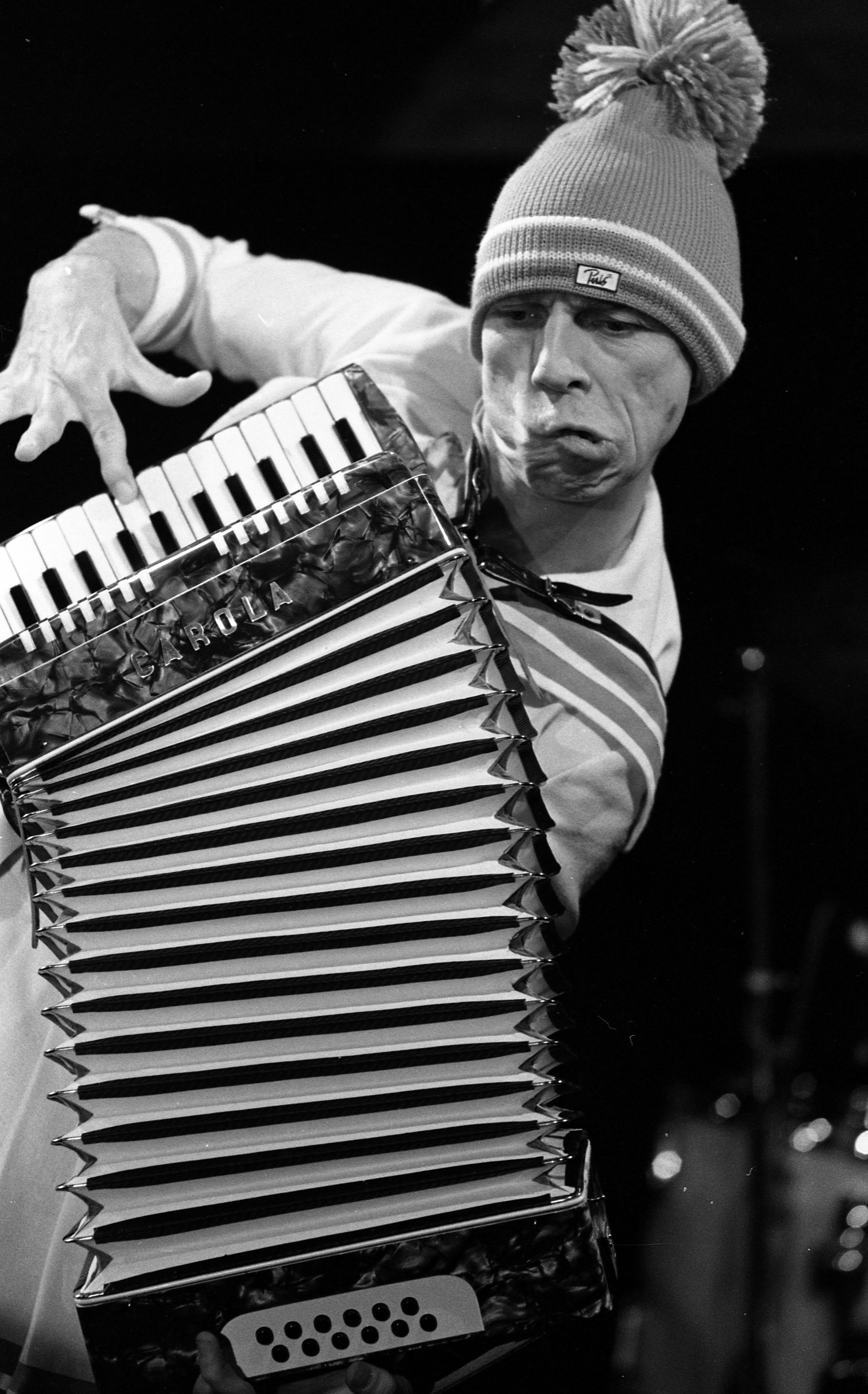
Teigen in 1983

Jahn Teigen was a member of the Norwegian humour trio Prima Vera, with Herodes Falsk and Tom Mathisen, who released seven albums between 1977 and 1984. Most of their repertoire consists of popular hits with the most ridiculous lyrics. (This struck a chord with the Norwegian audience, since, at the time, to ensure airplay, English-language songs often were re-recorded with Norwegian lyrics.) Their breakthrough album, 1978s Brakara, went to number 1 in the charts and sold more than 100,000 copies, and includes Teigen's spirited mock-Russian rendition of Mil Etter Mil, Zagra Znja Zagra. This 30-second version is the only available recording of the original arrangement; whether in English or Norwegian, Jahn Teigen's serious recordings of the song feature more electric guitar. The serious version was also a huge hit, making Teigen one of the few performers ever to have success with both a serious version and a parody of the same song simultaneously. Prima Vera had a number of hits, including such classics as Så lykkelig i Sverige ('So happy in Sweden', a version of The Turtles' Happy Together), Det er Norge som er bra and De gærne har det godt.

Teigen decided to leave Prima Vera in 1984, and did not speak with his former bandmates for 15 years, until they reconciled in 1999 at the funeral of their mutual friend Marius Müller. Prima Vera then had a brief reunion in the early 2000s.

=== Eurovision Song Contest ===
In 1978 in Paris Jahn Teigen made his first appearance on the Eurovision stage, performing the song Mil etter mil (Mile after mile), which received no points from any of the participating nations. This was the first occurrence of zero points with the new, and current, voting system of the Eurovision Song Contest. The song gained a huge audience in Norway; The single dominated the national singles chart for more than four months, being among the 10 most-bought singles for no less than 19 consecutive weeks, for five of those also topping the chart for the nation's most popular international hit. It remains Teigen's most successful hit. His runner-up single was called Jeg gi'kke opp, meaning I don't give up, and his first album release the same year was This Year's Loser.

Jahn Teigen returned to the Eurovision stage in 1982 in Harrogate, United Kingdom, where he sang Adieu in duet with Anita Skorgan (to whom he was married 1984-1988 and with whom he has a daughter) ending up at 12th place. In 1983, in Munich, Germany, he went solo again, with Anita Skorgan and three other women as backing vocalists, with the melody Do re mi, composed together with Anita Skorgan, which gave him his best position, a respectable 9th place. Teigen took part in the Norwegian national Eurovision final, called the Melodi Grand Prix, a record fourteen times between 1974 and 2005 with a total of 16 songs. Besides winning the Melodi Grand Prix four times, Teigen also finished as the runner-up on four occasions. In addition to this, Teigen was the host of Melodi Grand Prix and provided the interval act of the Melodi Grand Prix on a number of occasions. He also acted as commentator for Norwegian television in 1991 in Rome, together with John Andreassen.

==== Melodi Grand Prix participations ====
Year	Song	Place	Notes
1974	"Hvor er du?"	1	Performed with a small orchestra. Anne-Karine Strøm sang the song at Eurovision.
1975	"Kjærlighetens under"	2	Performed with a small orchestra.
1976	"Hastverk"	3	Performed with a small orchestra.
1976	"Alltid en vind"	4	Performed with a small orchestra together with Gudny Aspaas.
1976	"Voodoo"	2	Together with Gudny Aspaas with a small orchestra and Inger Lise Rypdal with a large orchestra.
1978	"Mil etter mil"	1	Finished 20th at Eurovision with 0 points.
1980	"Ja"	9	
1982	"Adieu"	1	Together with Anita Skorgan. Finished 12th at Eurovision with 40 points.
1983	"Do Re Mi"	1	Finished 9th at Eurovision with 53 points.
1988	"Glasnost"	2	
1989	"Optimist"	–	One of the finalists, but did not advance to the Superfinal.
1990	"Smil"	2	With Anita Skorgan and Carola Häggkvist as Backing vocalists.
1993	"Jackpot"	8	
1994	"Gi alt vi har"	5	
1996	"Ariel"	4	Together with Øystein Wiik. The duo called themselves To tenorer.
2005	"My Heart Is My Home"	4	

=== Extensive recording material ===
Teigen has released 17 albums as a soloist as of 1 January 2006. Six of these were best of collections, the last two being Jahn Teigens beste in 1994 and Fra null til gull (From nul till gold or From zero to hero as Teigen stated he would call an English release) in 2004, celebrating his 35+ years as popular artist. His most successful albums to date were En dags pause (One day's break) released in 1979, Mentalkrem (Mental cream) in 1980 and Klovn uten scene (Clown without stage) in 1988.

=== Stage work ===
In 1992 he took the part of the Executioner in the London run of the heavily panned Norwegian opera-musical Which Witch.

== Honours ==
- Knight First Class of the Order of St. Olav (2011)

== Memorable hits ==
- Voodoo (remembered mostly for his skeleton costume on stage in the Norwegian Eurovision Song Contest 1976)
- Mil etter mil (1978)
- Min første kjærlighet (1978)
- Adieu (1982)
- Glasnost (1988)
- Det vakreste som fins (1988)
- Optimist (1989)
- Gi meg fri (1992)

== Discography ==
=== Popol Vuh ===
==== Albums ====
- Popol Vuh (1973)
- Quiche Maya (1974)

=== Popol Ace ===
==== Album ====
- Stolen From Time (1976)
- Curly Sounds (1978) Note; Asa Krogtoft is the singer on this album, Jahn had left the group to go solo and work with Prima Vera.

===== Collection (best of) albums =====
- Popol Ace (1975)
- Cat of 9 Tales (1994)
- All We Have (2003) A box set with all their studio albums remastered on CD + one CD only available in this box called Popoloddities with demos, rarities and live recordings. Five songs were taken from a reunion concert (with Jahn back) at Rebekka West in Oslo in 1994.

==== DVD ====
- Silently Loud (2004) two DVD set with one DVD containing a reunion concert at Rockefeller in Oslo in 2003 with KORK and one containing material from the archives of NRK (Norsk rikskringkasting) from the 1970s.

=== Jahn Teigen ===
==== Singles ====
- Mil etter mil (1978)
- Jeg gi'kke opp (1978)
- Har du lyst på litt mer (1979)
- Ja (1980)
- Bli bra igjen (1982)
- Do re mi (1983)
- Glasnost (1988)
- Slå ring (1988)
- Optimist (1989)
- I skyggen av en drøm (1990)
- Gi meg fri (1992)
- Ensom natt (1993)

==== Albums ====
- Teigens tivoli (1977)
- This Year's Loser (1978)
- En dags pause (1979)
- Mentalkrem (1980)
- Klar dag/Instamatik (1982)
- Klovn uten scene (1988)
- Esilio paradiso (1992)
- Rondo (1993)
- Lys (1996)
- Magnet (2000)
- Utkledd som meg selv (2003)

===== Collection albums =====
- 67-76 (1976)
- All We Have Is The Past (1980)
- Hopp 78–83 (1983)
- Jahn Teigen (1989)
- Jahn Teigens beste: Litt av historien (1994)
- Hele historien (4 cd box 1994)
- Fra null til gull (2004) rerecordings of his old hits, done live in the studio.
- EMI Gull (2005)
- 40 største hits (2009)

==== DVD ====
- Jahn Teigen fra Tønsberg (2011) DVD/CD from his hugely successful retrospective stage show which ran for 2 years 2009-2011 in Tønsberg and Oslo.

=== Prima Vera ===
==== Albums ====
- Prima Vera (1977)
- Brakara (1978)
- Salmer og sanger vi gjerne hiver (1979)
- Den 5te (1981)
- Fisle Narrepanne i Tyrol (1981)
- Ha ha he he ho de gærne har'e godt (1982)
- Her kommer Olavs menn (1983)
- The Prima Vera Show (1999)

===== Collection albums =====
- The best of EBBA (1980)
- Absolute Prima Vera (1994)

==== Album ====
- "Teigen synger Falsk" (1975)

=== Jahn Teigen & Anita Skorgan ===
==== Single ====
- Adieu (1982)
- Friendly (1983)

==== Albums ====
- Cheek To Cheek (1983)

Awards and achievements
Preceded by Anita Skorgan with "Casanova"	Norway in the Eurovision Song Contest; 1978	Succeeded by Anita Skorgan with "Oliver"
Preceded by Finn Kalvik with "Aldri i livet"	Norway in the Eurovision Song Contest; 1982 (with Anita Skorgan)	Succeeded by Jahn Teigen with "Do Re Mi"
Preceded by Jahn Teigen & Anita Skorgan with "Adieu"	Norway in the Eurovision Song Contest; 1983	Succeeded by Dollie de Luxe with "Lenge leve livet"
