= Marius Müller (musician) =

Norwegian musician and radio/TV host

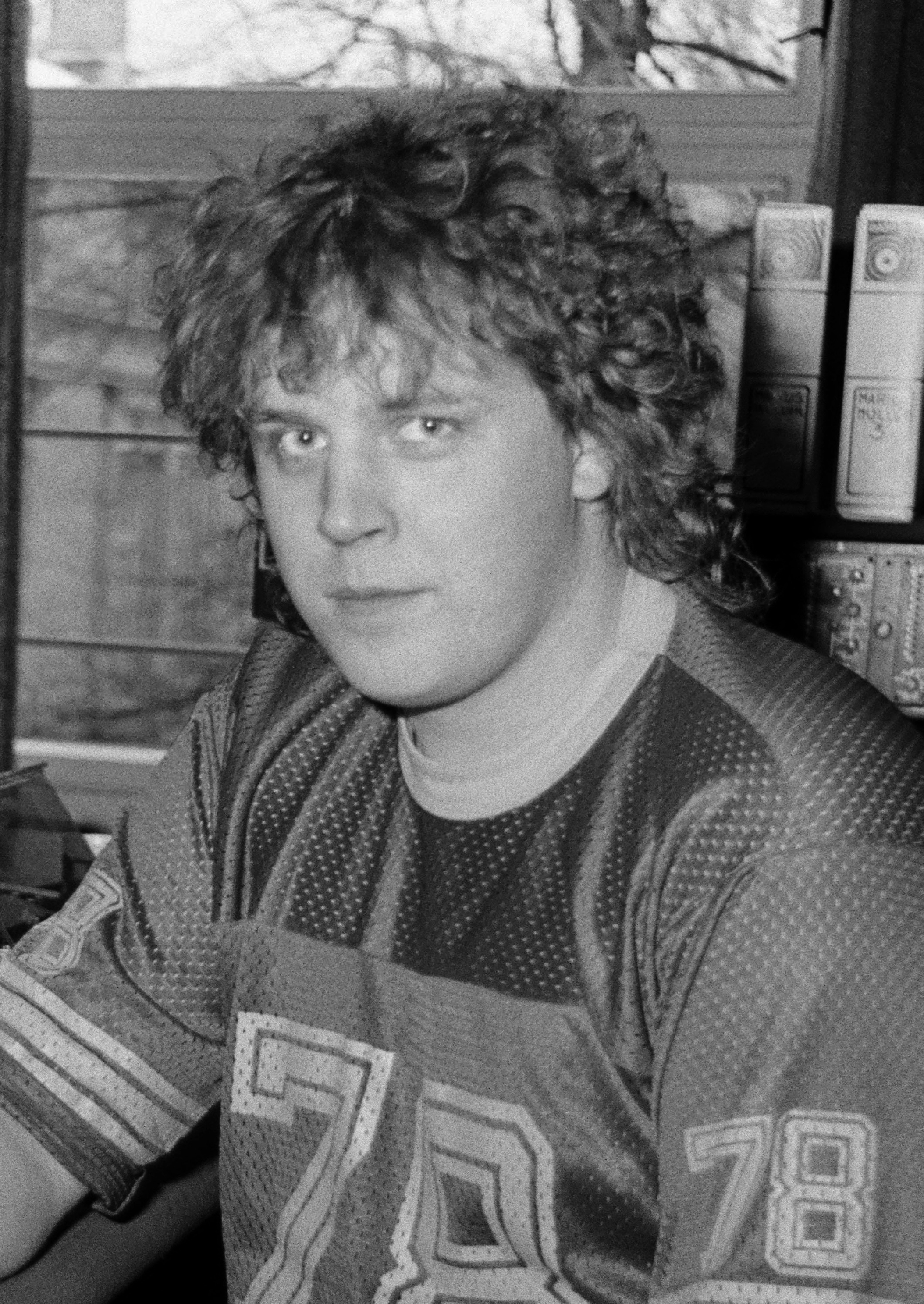

Background information
- Born: 29 June 1958; Narvik, Norway
- Died: 14 March 1999 (aged 40) Oslo, Norway
- Genres: Rock
- Occupations: Musician, composer
- Instruments: Guitar, vocals

Marius Müller (29 June 1958 – 14 March 1999) was a Norwegian guitarist, vocalist, songwriter, radio host, television host and record producer. He was raised in Manglerud, Oslo and began his career as a professional musician at sixteen. He first became famous in 1981 with the song "Den du veit" and released a total of six solo albums and five albums within the band Funhouse where he was the front man. Müller died 14 March 1999 in a car accident in Groruddalen, Oslo. He was considered one of the foremost guitarists in Norway.

== Career ==
Müller decided early on that he would become a guitarist. From the time he was six he heard loads of records with The Beatles together with his big brother. At nine, while vacationing at Sjusjøen with his family, he heard the tune "The Wind Cries Mary" by Jimi Hendrix play on the hotel jukebox. This was a turning point for him, "a sensory experience that made me decide to do something with my life", he said later in an interview with Aftenposten.

Twelve years old, he started his first band with buddies from the block in Manglerud where he grew up. Sixteen years old and straight from lower secondary school, he became a professional guitarist (later also songwriter) when he joined the French band Jackson Quintet on their world tour as they visited Northern Norway. In the next 24 years he worked tirelessly with his guitar as real companion, both as a musician, composer, record producer and radio and television host.

After the tour, with the French band, he worked among others with musicians like Jahn Teigen, Alex and Olav Stedje. He also was part of the band Lava, before he suddenly became a pop star when he went solo and released his debut album Den du veit (1981). The title melody was a major plague, and was compared with the ballad Carmen (1983) for always hanging on him. Marius Müller was "Den du veit" (the one you know). Ten years later when interviewed by Verdens Gang, he said that not for anything in the world he would like to experience success of that kind as "popbamse" again. Then he had established himself as a guitarist of far more weight.

In the late 1980s he formed Funhouse and this was his band until it split up in 1997. In Funhouse, Müller took on the role of the guitarist and the band lived on its reputation as a potent live band on concert stages all across Norway.

Parallel to Funhouse, Müller had a solo career and gave inter alia instrumental album Seks (1995). He also worked as a studio musician and producer, as well as within a composer team, working on the movie soundtrack for Veiviseren and on the Prima Vera film Soga om Olav den Hellige. He was awarded Gammleng-prisen as a studio musician in 1985. In the spring of 1996 he was one of the hosts of the radio show Herreavdelingen on NRK P3.

== Honors ==
- Gammleng-prisen 1985 in the class Studio musician

== Discography ==
=== Solo albums ===
- 1981: Den Du Veit (NorCD)
- 1982: Er'e Så Nøye 'a (NorCD)
- 1983: Marius (NorCD)
- 1985: The Big Beat (Sonet Records)
- 1986: Hard Asfalt (Sonet Records), various
- 1987: Boom Boom (Sonet Records)
- 1995: Seks (Sonet Records)
- 2000: Marius Müller (Universal Music), compilation

=== Within Funhouse ===
- 1990: Funhouse (Sonet Records)
- 1991: Maximum (Second Hand Records)
- 1993: Big (Sonet Records)
- 1994: Plugged! Live (Sonet Records), recorded at Rockefeller Music Hall (Oslo) 30. oktober 1993
- 1998: Det Norske Huset (Norske Gram)
- 2009: Plugged 2 – Rett Og Slett, live at the club Smuget in Oslo
