= Prima Vera (band) =

Norwegian comedy group

Prima Vera was a Norwegian comedy group existing from 1976 to 1984. For the most part, their music was humorous songs, often Norwegian versions of well-known international hits with totally unrelated, funny, or sarcastic lyrics. The group ended in 1984 when one of the members, Jahn Teigen, left the group to focus on his own career, which had a more serious character. This led to controversies with one of the other members, Herodes Falsk, until a short reunion of the group in 2000.

== Members ==
- Tom Mathisen
- Jahn Teigen
- Herodes Falsk (lyrics)

== Discography ==
- Du er eit svin/Jeg bare sitter her og kjeder meg (single, 1977)
- Prima Vera (1977)
- Brakara (1978)
- Salmer og sanger vi gjerne hiver (1979)
- Best of Ebba (compilation album, 1980)
- Fisle Narrepanne i Tyrol (1981)
- Den 5te (1981)
- Ha ha he he ho! (De gærne har'e godt) (1982)
- Her kommer Olavs Menn (1983)
- Absolute Prima Vera (1994)
- Prima Vera Show (1996)
- Rest of the best vol 2.5 (compilation album, 2000)
