= Trond Granlund =

- Born: 29 July 1950 (age 74); Oslo, Norway
- Genres: Rock, folk
- Occupation(s): Singer, songwriter
- Years active: 1973–present

Trond Granlund (born in Oslo, Norway, on 29 July 1950) is a Norwegian rock and folk singer, composer and guitarist.

Granlund grew up on Torshov and Manglerud in Oslo, and has lived in Lørenskog since 1968. He started performing in 1973, releasing the independent Rock album. He released his first solo album, Trond Granlund, in 1976 and has been prolific in releasing of albums. Until the mid-1990s, most of his output was in English, but with the album Tida er'e ingen som kan snu in 1995, he started to release albums almost exclusively in Norwegian.

An autobiographical album, På vei til rock 'n roll (meaning "on the road to rock'n'roll"), was released in 2001. An autobiographical book was published in 2012 titled and his next book coming time, the Council in 2007. In 2012, he published his book Sanger jeg lærte av mamma og pappa (meaning "songs I learned from my mom and dad"). He is married and have one daughter and three sons.

== Awards ==
- 1981: Norwegian Grammy in "pop category" for Pleasant Surprise
- 1985: "Gammleng Award" in "pop category"

== Discography ==
=== Albums ===
Studio albums

- 1973: Rock
- 1976: Granlund
- 1977: Utstøtt
- 1978: Made in Manchester
- 1979: Starstruck
- 1980: Eloise (NOR #13)
- 1981: Pleasant Surprise (NOR #2)
- 1982: Stay the Night (NOR #12)
- 1983: Driftin' (NOR #11)
- 1985: Hearts in Danger (NOR #20)
- 1986: The Ride
- 1989: Promise the Moon
- 1990: Roots
- 1992: Pleasure and Tears
- 1993: I Can't Quit Now
- 1995: Tida er'e ingen som kan snu
- 1997: Bilder inni hue
- 2000: Østkantfolk
- 2002: På vei til rock'n'roll
- 2005: En litt forvirra fyr
- 2007: Kommer tid, kommer råd
- 2010: Sanger jeg lærte av faren min (NOR #14)
- 2012: Bror min og jeg (NOR #36)

Live

- 2012: En rønner fra Manglerud – Live fra NRK Studio 19 (NOR #30)

Compilations

- 1998: Fra Manglerud til Manchester 1973–1998
- 2003: Høyt, lavt og langt

=== Singles ===
Year	Single	Chart position
Year	Single	NOR
1980	"Give Me Time"	4
1980	"Eloise"	7
1981	"Girl 16"	3
1982	"Vente på noe"	6

Awards
Preceded by Dollie de Luxe	Recipient of the Pop Spellemannprisen; 1981	Succeeded by Olav Stedje
