= Hilde Heltberg =

Norwegian singer, guitarist and songwriter

Hilde Heltberg (30 September 1959 – 4 September 2011) was a Norwegian singer, guitarist and songwriter, born in Oslo, Norway.

== Career ==
Heltberg started her career in the late 70s when she entered a talent competition judged by Stein Ove Berg, who became her mentor. She later joined the band Uncle John's Band, and, in 1982, X-tra, with Trond Granlund. She released her first, self-titled, solo album in 1982, but found a more individual style in 1983 with På bare bein (On bare feet), produced by Jonas Fjeld.

All in all Heltberg released 12 albums over the course of her career. She also participated in the Norwegian qualification for the Eurovision Song Contest three times as an artist: in 1980, 1984 and 1985, and as a songwriter in 2000. Her last single, titled "Elske fritt" (Free love) was released in 2009. Heltberg died from cancer at Rikshospitalet on 4 September 2011.

== Discography ==
=== Albums ===
- 1982: Hilde Heltberg
- 1983: På bare bein
- 2012: Elske det umulige

=== Singles ===
- 2009: "Elske fritt"

Melodi Grand Prix (Eurovision selection)

- MGP 1980: "Maestro"
- MGP 1984: "Ditt smil"
- MGP 1985: "Livet har en sjanse"
