= Rita Eriksen =

Norwegian singer (born 1966)

Rita Eriksen (born May 26, 1966, in Sola Municipality, Norway) is a Norwegian singer, as solo artist and in the 1990s, as part of the Norwegian singing duo Eriksen with her sibling guitarist and singer Frank Eriksen. Rita Eriksen was also briefly a member of vocal group Queen Bees.

== Career ==
Early life

Eriksen was early interested in music and vocal performance. Taking part in extra curricular musical activities such as choir and forming a band with Ivar Magne and Terje and other childhood friends in the 7th grade.

In duo Eriksen

In 1989, she formed the duo Eriksen is a Norwegian duo consisting of Rita on vocals and Frank Eriksen, her sibling, on guitar and vocals. The duo played music in the roots / country / blues / show genre. The duo released four studio albums; the two first one with English subtitles. For debut album Two Blue in 1992, the duo received the 1992 Norwegian Grammy Award 1992 in roots and country music. The duo collaborated with several artists, including the American blues musician Delbert McClinton who sang a duet with Rita Eriksen on the song "Movin' Time" written by Jeff Wasserman and Torstein Flakne on the album Two Blue. Eriksen sold 170,000 albums combined. Sony BMG released the compilation album Eriksen - De aller beste (The very best) in the spring of 2009. The album was heavily promoted by television campaign, reached #1 in the Norwegian albums chart and went platinum. In addition to his membership in the duo, Frank was a member of the Irish-inspired band The Tramps since 2000.

Solo

Rita Eriksen based in Oslo also pursued her own solo career concurrently with the duo releasing her debut solo album was Back from Wonderland in 1988. She recorded and released the album Tideland, together with the Irish singer Dolores Keane and The Cardigans.

In addition she was a member in the vocal group Queen Bees with Anita Skorgan and Hilde Heltberg

Eriksen collaborated with a number of Norwegian artists and participated as a guest vocalist on several recordings (including Jonas Brothers, Three Little Chinese and Hellbillies). The most famous is her contribution to the song "Tir n'a noir" by Vamp. In 1997, she won Gammleng-prisen Award.

In 2008, Rita Eriksen made a big comeback with the album Hjerteslag (Heartbeat). It was Rita Eriksen's first album in 10 years. The single "Karl Johan" went platinum. Rita Eriksen also released her 2009 Christmas album Velkommen inn (Welcome) giving new lyrics to traditional Christmas songs. Lyrics were contributed by Erik Hillestad, Martin Alfsen and Ingvar Hovland

Eriksen also debuted in musical theater as a singing actor at Rogaland Teater in the play Skyfri himmel (Clear sky).

She returned in 2014 releasing her new solo album Øyeblikk.

== Discography ==
=== Albums ===
Solo

Year	Album	Peak positions	Certification
Year	Album	NOR	Certification
1988	Back from Wonderland		
1996	Tideland (joint album with Dolores Keane)	12	
2008	Hjerteslag	6	
2009	Frelsesarmeens Juleplate 2009 - Velkommen inn	10	
2014	Øyeblikk	11	

as part of duo Eriksen

- 1992: Two Blue
- 1994: The Water is Wide
- 1995: Alt vende tebage
- 1998: Blåmandag
- 2009: De aller beste (compilation album)

as part of Queen Bees

- 2005: From the Fountain

=== Singles ===
Featured in

- 2010: "Every Little Thing She Does Is Magic" (Georg Wadenius featuring Rita Eriksen)
