= Olav Stedje =

Norwegian singer-songwriter (born 1954)

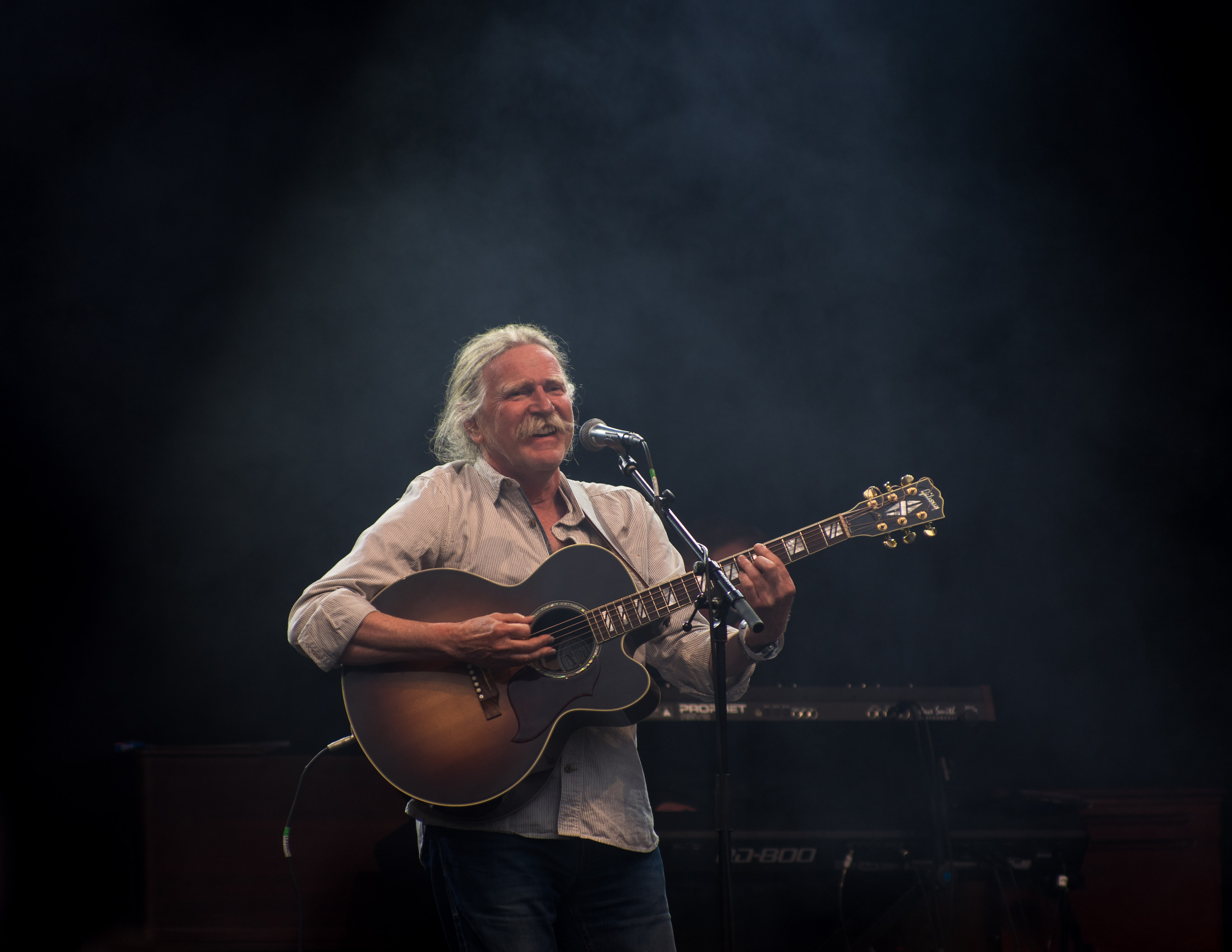
Olav Stedje (2021)

Olav Stedje (Born 8 June 1953) is a Norwegian singer-songwriter, known for a number of soft rock recordings, six silver albums and three attempts in Melodi Grand Prix.

== Early life ==
Stedje was born in Sogndal Municipality, and made his debut as a solo singer within the local band Compact in the early 1970s, releasing two singles. He had his Norwegian break through with the album Ta meg med in 1981, receiving an Spellemannpris in 1982.

== Honors ==
- 1982: Spellemannprisen in the class Pop

== Discography ==
- Ta meg med (Take me with you) (1981)
- Stedje (1982)
- Tredje stedje (Third stedje) (1983)
- Rocken Bom (1984)
- Silje (1984)
- Når sola renn (When the sun run) (1986)
- Eg kjem likevel (I'll come anyway) (1987)
- Ei gåve til deg (A gift to you) (1990)
- Bot og bedring (Stay well) (Tylden Records, 1995)
- 21 beste (The best 21) (Tylden Records, 1998)
- Livstegn (Lifesigns) (25 September 2006)

Awards
Preceded by Trond Granlund	Recipient of the Pop Spellemannprisen; 1982	Succeeded by The Monroes
