= List of Eurovision Song Contest entries (1956–2003) =

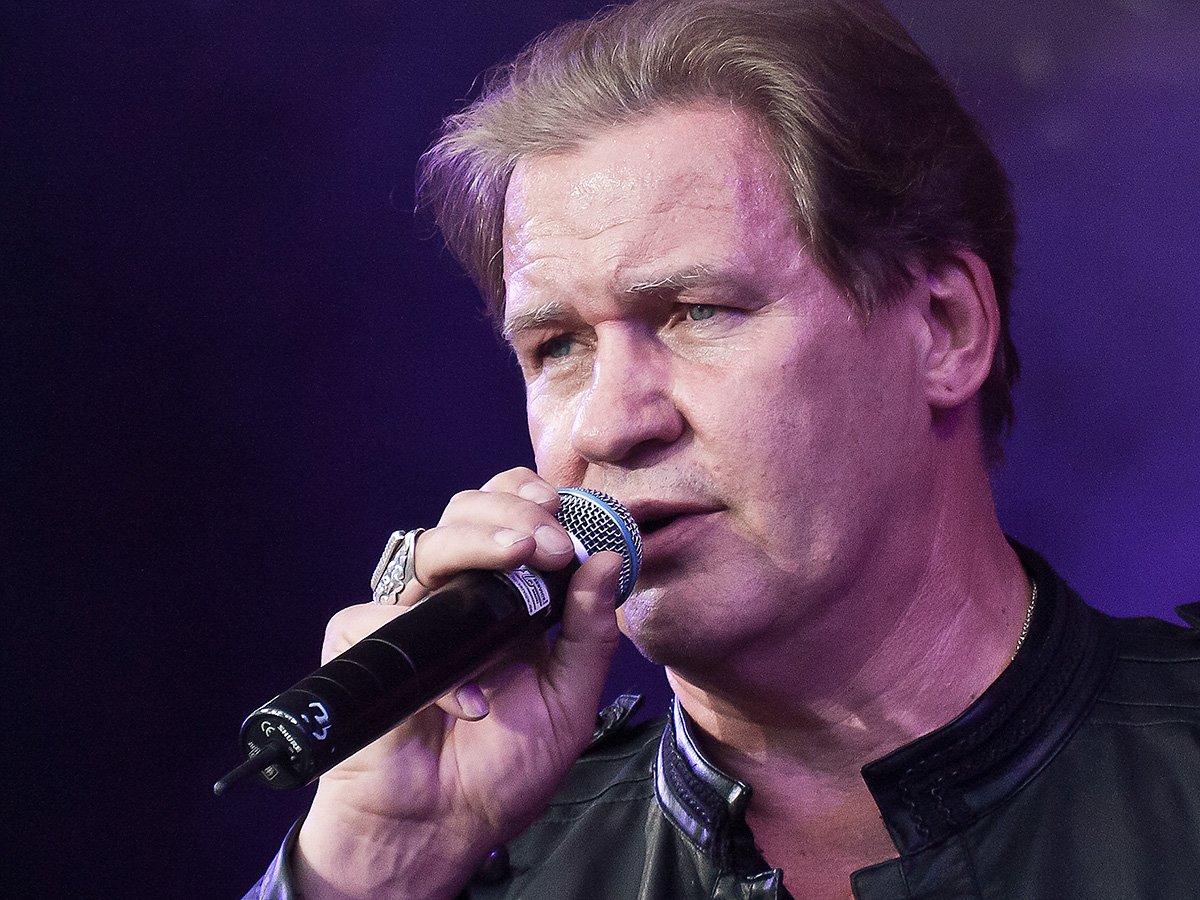
Ireland's Johnny Logan has won the contest three times as a performer and composer, and was the first performer to win multiple contests.

Since the Eurovision Song Contest began in 1956 and until semi-finals were introduced in 2004, a total of 917 entries were submitted, comprising songs and artists which represented thirty-eight countries. The contest, organised by the European Broadcasting Union (EBU), is held annually between members of the union, with participating broadcasters from different countries submitting songs to the event and casting votes to determine the most popular in the competition. From an original seven participating countries in the first edition, over twenty entries were submitted into the competition in the early 2000s, before the contest started expanding more rapidly in 2004.

Principally open to active member broadcasters of the EBU, eligibility to participate in the contest is not determined by geographic inclusion within the traditional boundaries of Europe. Several countries from outside of Europe have previously submitted entries into the contest, including countries in Western Asia and North Africa, as well as transcontinental countries with only part of their territory in Europe.

Between 1956 and 2003, Germany made the most contest appearances, participating in all but one event since its founding. Morocco conversely had participated the fewest times, competing only once in 1980. Ireland held the record for the most victories, having won the contest seven times, including four wins in the 1990s. France, Luxembourg and the United Kingdom were the second-most successful nations in the contest, having won on five occasions. In addition to its five contest wins, the United Kingdom also placed second fifteen times – more than any other country – and also holds the record for the most consecutive contest appearances, competing in every edition since 1959. Although it had also achieved two contest wins, Norway held the record for the most last-place finishes in contest history, having featured at the bottom of the scoreboard nine times.

Contests
1950s							1956	1957	1958	1959
1960s	1960	1961	1962	1963	1964	1965	1966	1967	1968	1969
1970s	1970	1971	1972	1973	1974	1975	1976	1977	1978	1979
1980s	1980	1981	1982	1983	1984	1985	1986	1987	1988	1989
1990s	1990	1991	1992	1993	1994	1995	1996	1997	1998	1999
2000s	2000	2001	2002	2003	2004	2005	2006	2007	2008	2009
2010s	2010	2011	2012	2013	2014	2015	2016	2017	2018	2019
2020s	~~2020~~	2021	2022	2023	2024	2025	2026			
Entries which failed to qualify; 1956–2003; Withdrawn and disqualified entries; 1956–2003; 2004–present

== Entries ==
The following tables list the entries which have been performed at the contest between 1956 and 2003. Entries are listed by order of their first performance in the contest; entry numbers provide a cumulative total of all songs performed at the contest throughout its history, and a second cumulative total outlines the total entries for each country. Songs which were performed multiple times are counted only once in the tables, with entry numbers for the performances of semi-final qualifiers marked in italics in the respective finals. For the purposes of the first contest, where each country was represented by two songs, each song is counted as a distinct entry but both songs are counted as a single entry for that country.

Only songs which have competed in the contest final. Songs which failed to qualify from the 1993 qualifying round for new Eastern European countries or the 1996 audio-only qualifying round are subsequently not counted as official entries and are not included in the participation history for each country on the official Eurovision website.

In line with the official Eurovision Song Contest website, entries which represented the former West Germany prior to German reunification (until 1990) and those from the subsequently unified state Germany (since 1991) are considered to have represented the same country. Also in keeping with the official Eurovision records, the 1992 entry which represented the Federal Republic of Yugoslavia, subsequently renamed Serbia and Montenegro in 2003, is listed as having represented Yugoslavia rather than Serbia and Montenegro; Serbia and Montenegro is therefore considered to have made its first appearance in 2004.

Table key

1 Winner – Winning entries in each edition of the contest
2 Second place – Entries which came second in each edition of the contest
3 Third place – Entries which came third in each edition of the contest
◁ Last place – Entries which came last in each edition of the contest

=== 1950s ===
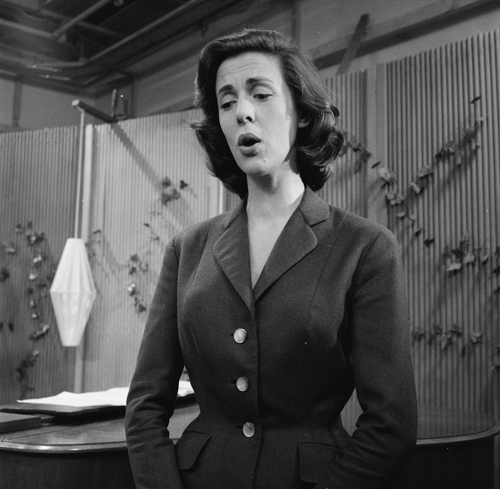
The Netherlands' Jetty Paerl performed the first ever Eurovision entry in 1956.

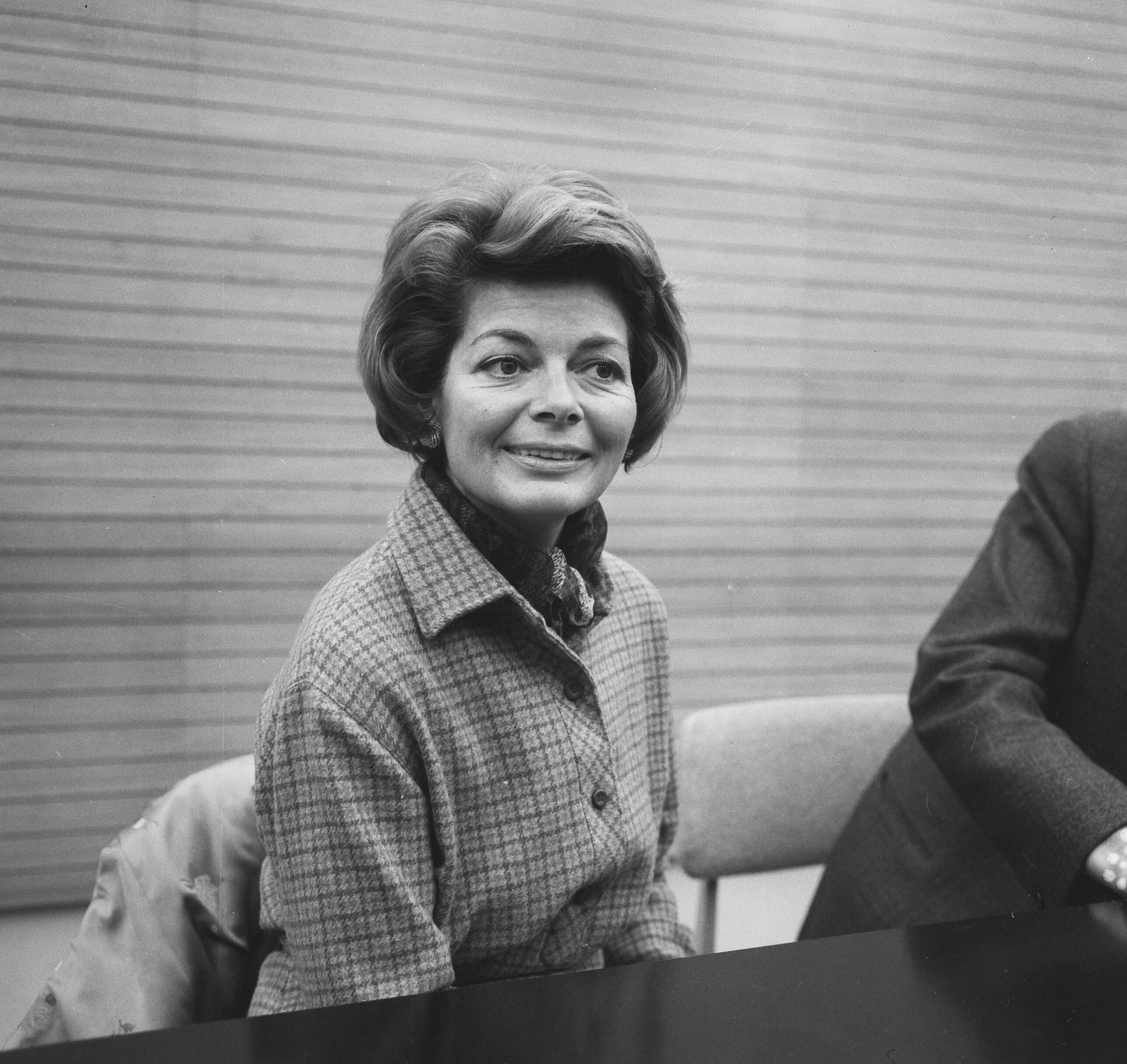
Lys Assia contributed four Eurovision entries for Switzerland, including the contest's first winning entry.

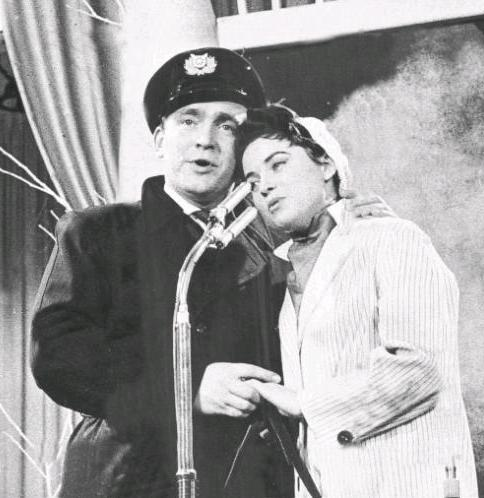
Denmark's debut entrants Birthe Wilke and Gustav Winckler were also the first duo to perform at Eurovision.

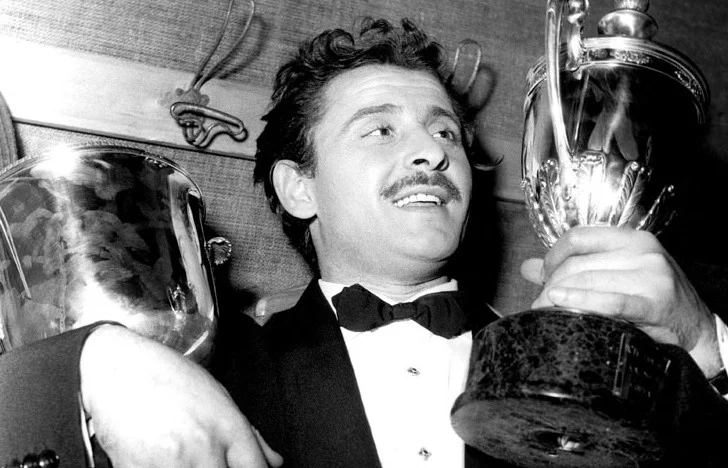
Domenico Modugno performed three different Eurovision entries for Italy in the 1950s and 1960s.

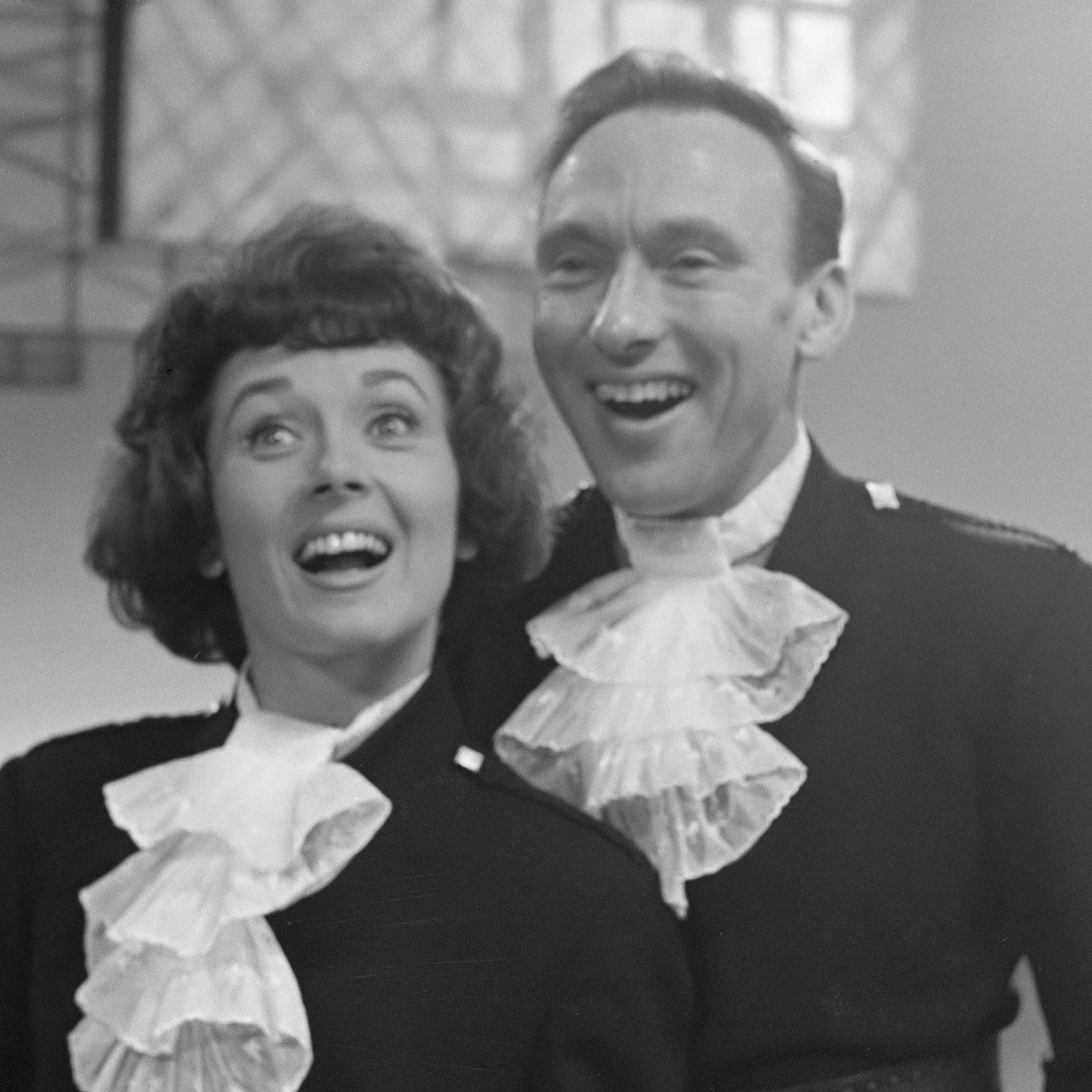
Pearl Carr and Teddy Johnson were the first of sixteen acts to place second in the contest for the United Kingdom.

Eurovision Song Contest 1956
#	R/O	Country	#	Artist	Song	Language	Songwriter(s)	Placing (Note: The full results of the first contest are unknown as only the winner was announced. The official Eurovision website lists all remaining entries as having placed second.)
1	1	Netherlands	1 (1)	Jetty Paerl	"De vogels van Holland"	Dutch	Cor Lemaire; Annie M. G. Schmidt	—N/a
2	2	Switzerland	1 (1)	Lys Assia	"Das alte Karussell"	German	Georg Betz-Stahl	—N/a
3	3	Belgium	1 (1)	Fud Leclerc	"Messieurs les noyés de la Seine"	French	Jean Miret; Robert Montal; Jack Say	—N/a
4	4	Germany	1 (1)	Walter Andreas Schwarz	"Im Wartesaal zum großen Glück"	German	Walter Andreas Schwarz	—N/a
5	5	France	1 (1)	Mathé Altéry	"Le Temps perdu"	French	André Lodge; Rachèle Thoreau	—N/a
6	6	Luxembourg	1 (1)	Michèle Arnaud	"Ne crois pas"	French	Christian Guittreau	—N/a
7	7	Italy	1 (1)	Franca Raimondi	"Aprite le finestre"	Italian	Virgilio Panzuti; Pino Perotti	—N/a
8	8	Netherlands	1 (2)	Corry Brokken	"Voorgoed voorbij"	Dutch	Jelle de Vries	—N/a
9	9	Switzerland	1 (2)	Lys Assia	"Refrain"	French	Émile Gardaz; Géo Voumard	1
10	10	Belgium	1 (2)	Mony Marc	"Le Plus Beau Jour de ma vie"	French	Claude Alix; David Bee	—N/a
11	11	Germany	1 (2)	Freddy Quinn	"So geht das jede Nacht"	German	Peter Moesser; Lotar Olias	—N/a
12	12	France	1 (2)	Dany Dauberson	"Il est là"	French	Simone Vallauris	—N/a
13	13	Luxembourg	1 (2)	Michèle Arnaud	"Les Amants de minuit"	French	Pierre Lambry; Simone Laurencin	—N/a
14	14	Italy	1 (2)	Tonina Torrielli	"Amami se vuoi"	Italian	Vittorio Mascheroni; Mario Panzeri	—N/a

Eurovision Song Contest 1957
#	R/O	Country	#	Artist	Song	Language	Songwriter(s)	Placing
15	1	Belgium	2	Bobbejaan Schoepen	"Straatdeuntje"	Dutch	Eric Franssen; Harry Frékin	8
16	2	Luxembourg	2	Danièle Dupré	"Tant de peine"	French	Jean-Pierre Kemmer; Jacques Taber	4
17	3	United Kingdom	1	Patricia Bredin	"All"	English	Alan Stranks; Reynell Wreford	7
18	4	Italy	2	Nunzio Gallo	"Corde della mia chitarra"	Italian	Giuseppe Fiorelli; Mario Ruccione	6
19	5	Austria	1	Bob Martin	"Wohin, kleines Pony?"	German	Kurt Svab; Hans Werner	10 ◁
20	6	Netherlands	2	Corry Brokken	"Net als toen"	Dutch	Willy van Hemert; Guus Jansen	1
21	7	Germany	2	Margot Hielscher	"Telefon, Telefon"	German	Friedrich Meyer; Ralph Maria Siegel	4
22	8	France	2	Paule Desjardins	"La Belle Amour"	French	Francis Carco; Guy Lafarge	2
23	9	Denmark	1	Birthe Wilke and Gustav Winckler	"Skibet skal sejle i nat"	Danish	Erik Fiehn; Poul Sørensen	3
24	10	Switzerland	2	Lys Assia	"L'Enfant que j'étais"	French	Émile Gardaz; Géo Voumard	8

Eurovision Song Contest 1958
#	R/O	Country	#	Artist	Song	Language	Songwriter(s)	Placing
25	1	Italy	3	Domenico Modugno	"Nel blu, dipinto di blu"	Italian	Franco Migliacci; Domenico Modugno	3
26	2	Netherlands	3	Corry Brokken	"Heel de wereld"	Dutch	Benny Vreden	9 ◁
27	3	France	3	André Claveau	"Dors mon amour"	French	Pierre Delanoë; Hubert Giraud	1
28	4	Luxembourg	3	Solange Berry	"Un grand amour"	French	Michel Eric; Monique Laniece; Raymond Roche	9 ◁
29	5	Sweden	1	Alice Babs	"Lilla stjärna"	Swedish	Åke Gerhard; Gunnar Wersén	4
30	6	Denmark	2	Raquel Rastenni	"Jeg rev et blad ud af min dagbog"	Danish	Harry Jensen	8
31	7	Belgium	3	Fud Leclerc	"Ma petite chatte"	French	André Dohet	5
32	8	Germany	3	Margot Hielscher	"Für zwei Groschen Musik"	German	Walter Brandin; Friedrich Meyer; Fred Rauch	7
33	9	Austria	2	Liane Augustin	"Die ganze Welt braucht Liebe"	German	Günther Leopold; Kurt Werner	5
34	10	Switzerland	3	Lys Assia	"Giorgio"	German, Italian	Paul Burkhard; Fridolin Tschudi	2

Eurovision Song Contest 1959
#	R/O	Country	#	Artist	Song	Language	Songwriter(s)	Placing
35	1	France	4	Jean Philippe	"Oui oui oui oui"	French	Pierre Cour; Hubert Giraud	3
36	2	Denmark	3	Birthe Wilke	"Uh, jeg ville ønske jeg var dig"	Danish	Carl Andersen; Otto Lington	5
37	3	Italy	4	Domenico Modugno	"Piove"	Italian	Domenico Modugno; Dino Verde	6
38	4	Monaco	1	Jacques Pills	"Mon ami Pierrot"	French	Raymond Bravard; Florence Veran	11 ◁
39	5	Netherlands	4	Teddy Scholten	"Een beetje"	Dutch	Willy van Hemert; Dick Schallies	1
40	6	Germany	4	Alice and Ellen Kessler	"Heut' woll'n wir tanzen geh'n"	German	Astrid Voltmann; Helmut Zander	8
41	7	Sweden	2	Brita Borg	"Augustin"	Swedish	Åke Gerhard; Harry Sandin	9
42	8	Switzerland	4	Christa Williams	"Irgendwoher"	German	Lothar Löffler	4
43	9	Austria	3	Ferry Graf	"Der K. und K. Kalypso aus Wien"	German	Günther Leopold; Norbert Pawlicki	9
44	10	United Kingdom	2	Pearl Carr and Teddy Johnson	"Sing Little Birdie"	English	Stan Butcher; Syd Cordell	2
45	11	Belgium	4	Bob Benny	"Hou toch van mij"	Dutch	Hans Flower; Ke Riema	6

=== 1960s ===
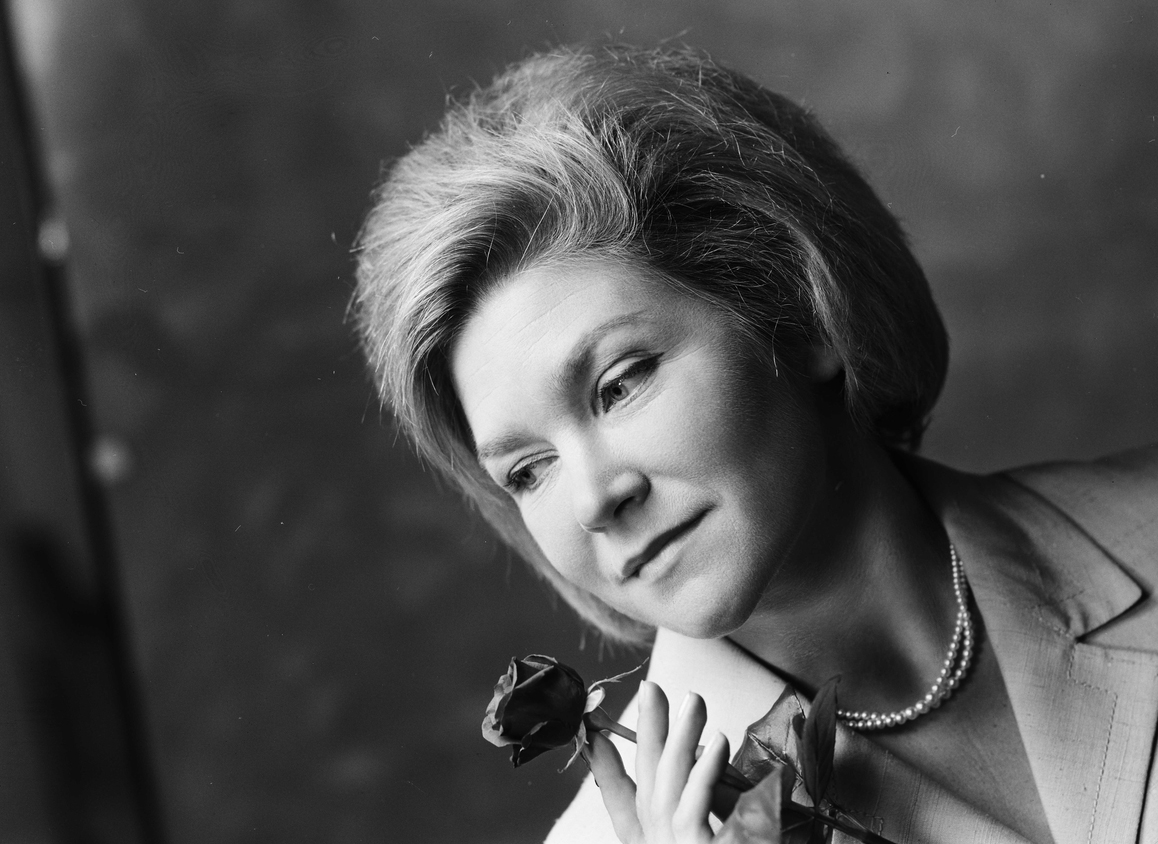
Nora Brockstedt performed the first Norwegian entry in 1960.

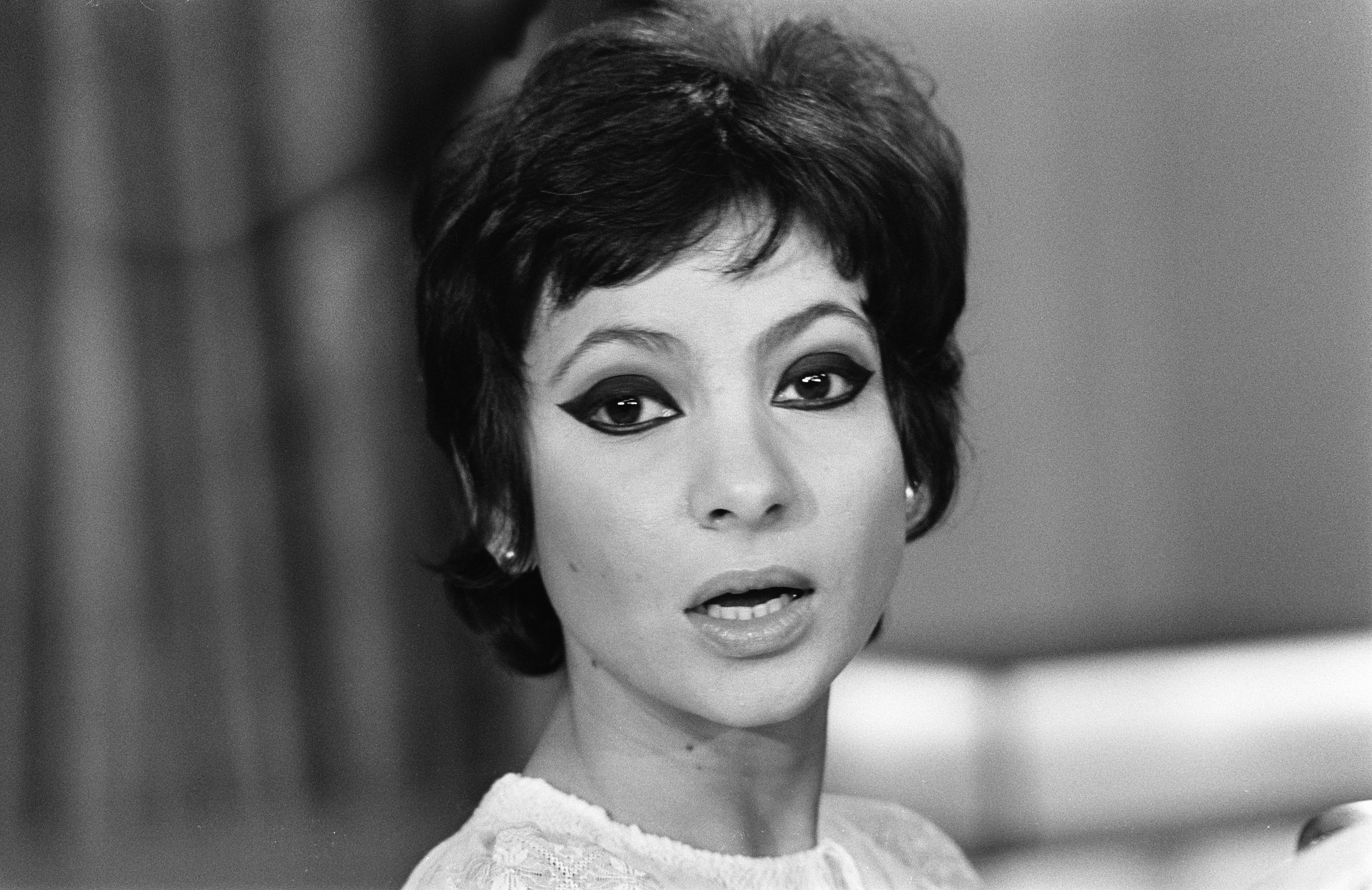
In 1963, with the song from Switzerland, Esther Ofarim performed the 100th Eurovision entry.

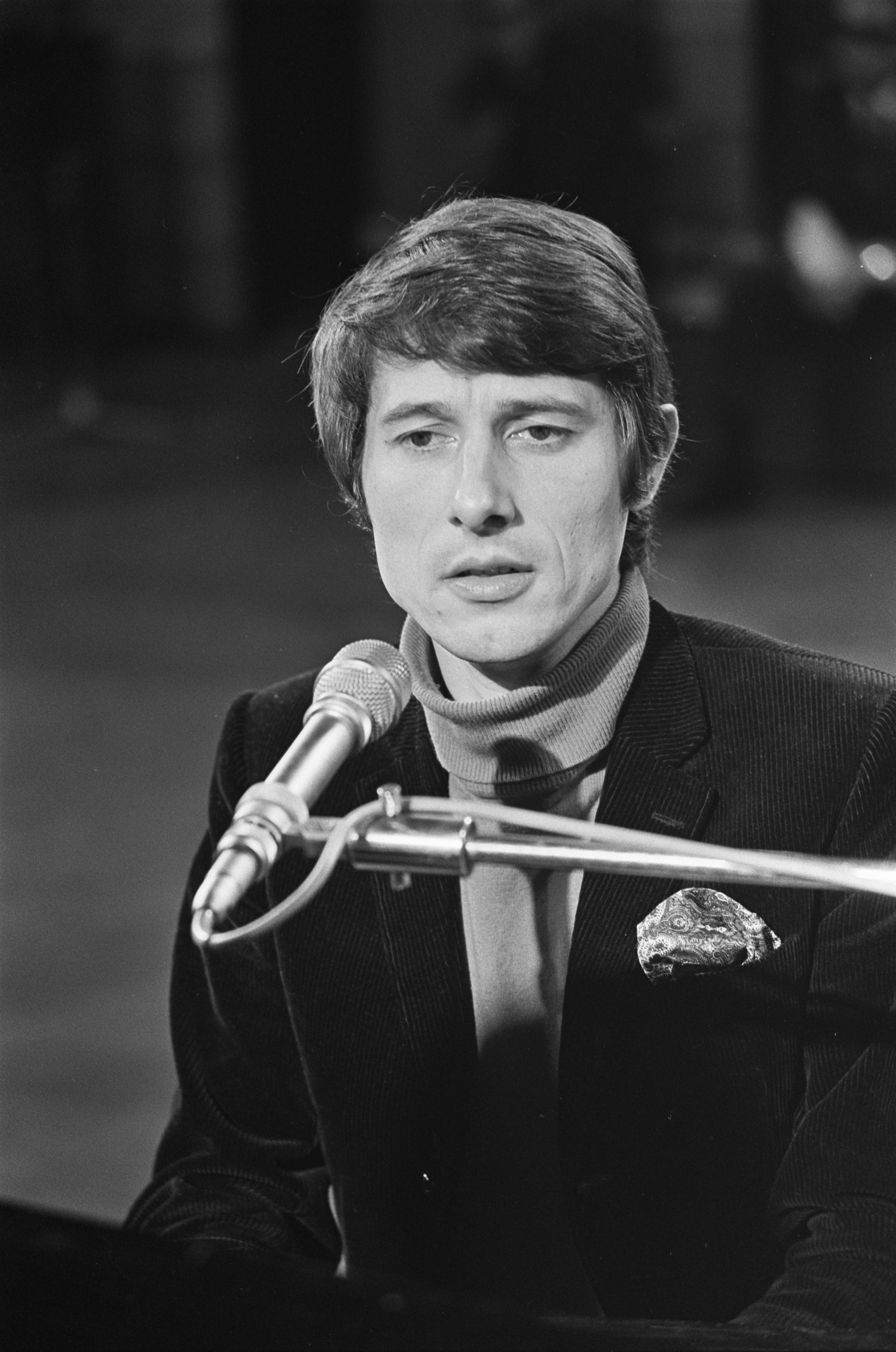
Udo Jürgens performed three consecutive contest entries for Austria in 1964, 1965 and 1966.

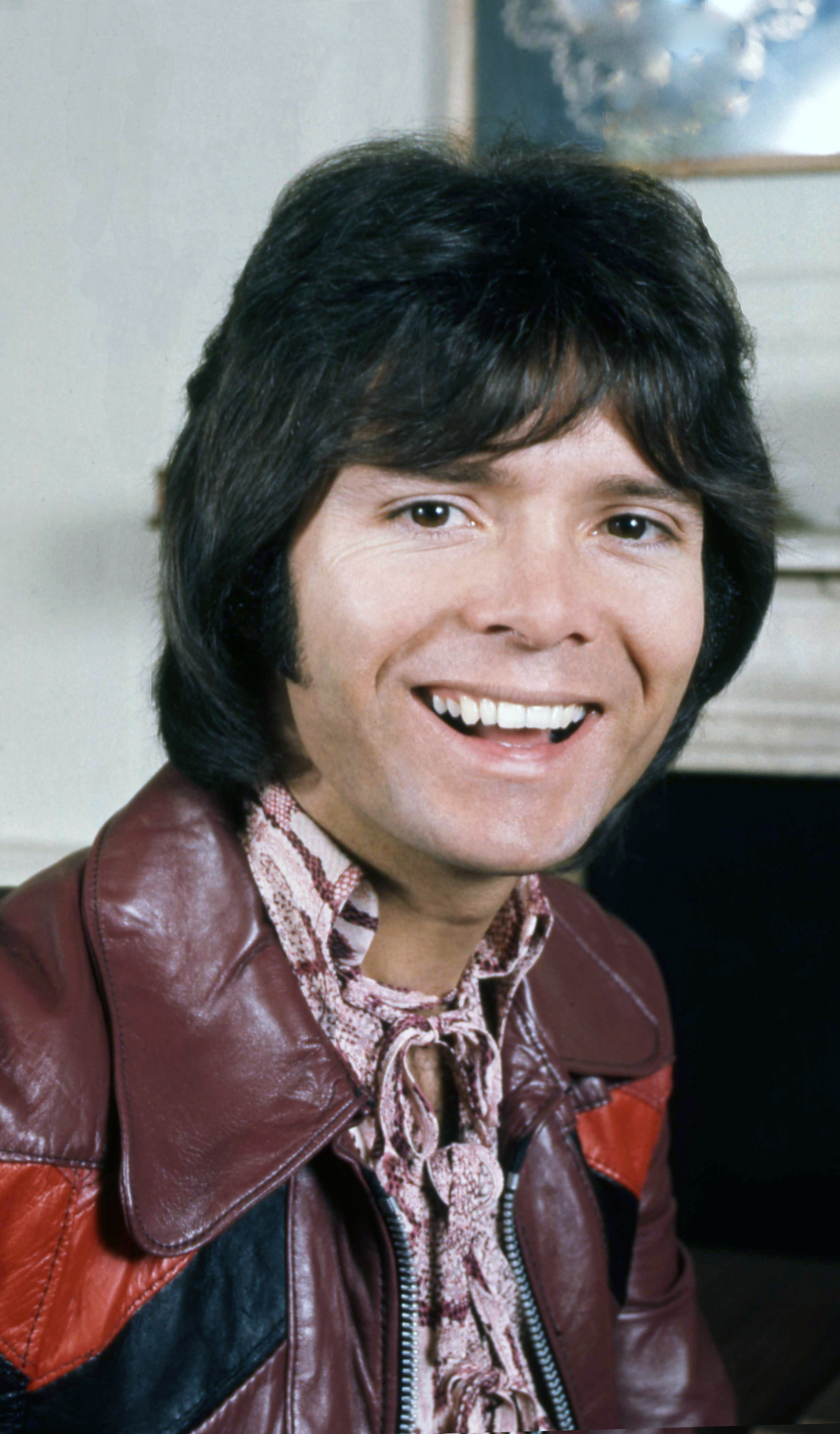
Cliff Richard contributed two Eurovision entries for the United Kingdom, in 1968 and 1973.

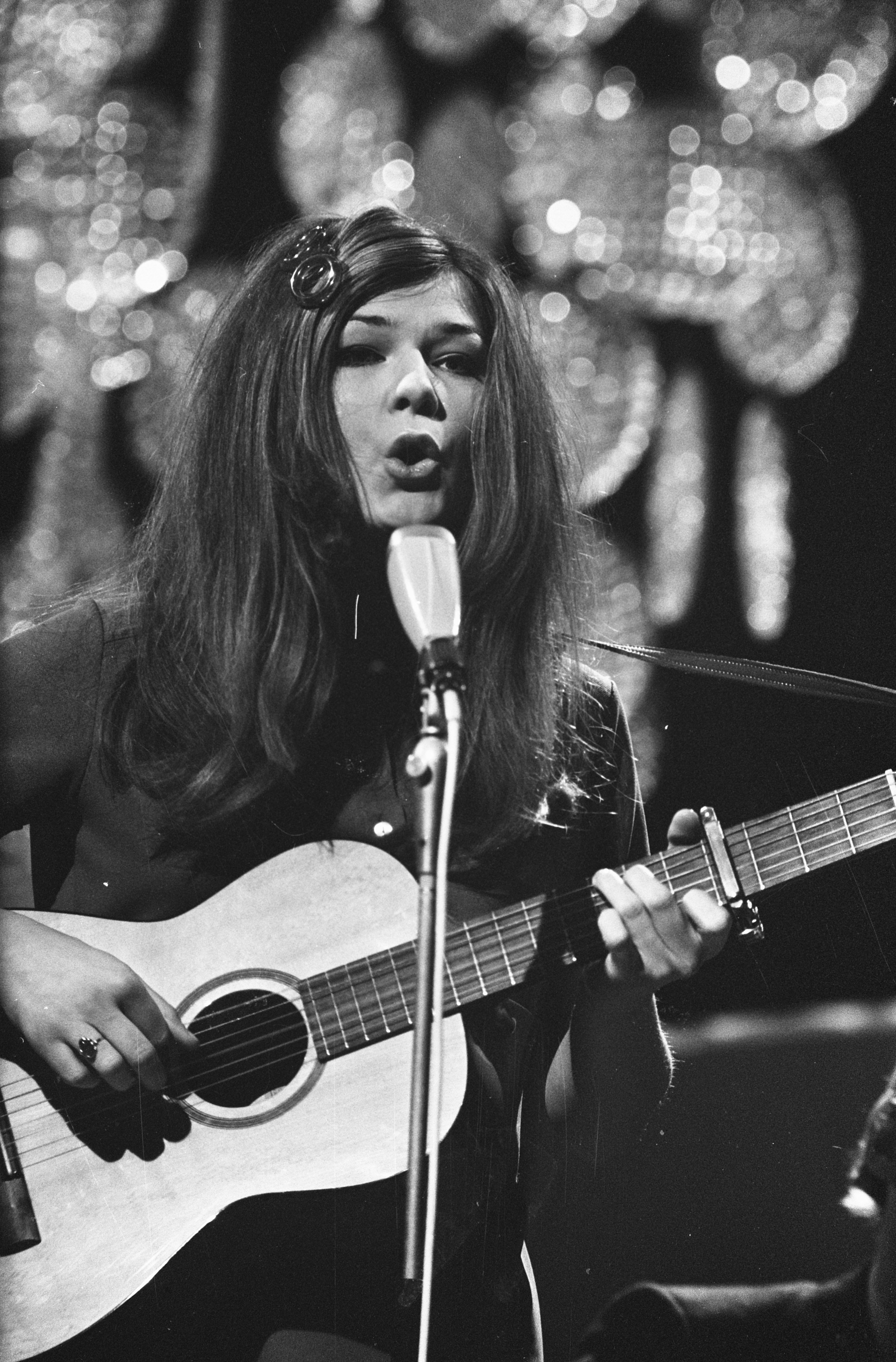
The Netherlands' Lenny Kuhr performed the contest's 200th entry and was one of the four winners of the 1969 contest.

Eurovision Song Contest 1960
#	R/O	Country	#	Artist	Song	Language	Songwriter(s)	Placing
46	1	United Kingdom	3	Bryan Johnson	"Looking High, High, High"	English	John Watson	2
47	2	Sweden	3	Siw Malmkvist	"Alla andra får varann"	Swedish	Åke Gerhard; Ulf Källqvist	10
48	3	Luxembourg	4	Camillo Felgen	"So laang we's du do bast"	Luxembourgish	Henri Moots; Jean Roderès	13 ◁
49	4	Denmark	4	Katy Bødtger	"Det var en yndig tid"	Danish	Sven Buemann; Vilfred Kjær	10
50	5	Belgium	5	Fud Leclerc	"Mon amour pour toi"	French	Robert Montal; Jack Say	6
51	6	Norway	1	Nora Brockstedt	"Voi-voi"	Norwegian	George Elgaaen	4
52	7	Austria	4	Harry Winter	"Du hast mich so fasziniert"	German	Robert Gilbert; Robert Stolz	7
53	8	Monaco	2	François Deguelt	"Ce soir-là"	French	Pierre Dorsey; Hubert Giraud	3
54	9	Switzerland	5	Anita Traversi	"Cielo e terra"	Italian	Mario Robbiani	8
55	10	Netherlands	5	Rudi Carrell	"Wat een geluk"	Dutch	Willy van Hemert; Dick Schallies	12
56	11	Germany	5	Wyn Hoop	"Bonne nuit ma chérie"	German	Franz Josef Breuer; Kurt Schwabach	4
57	12	Italy	5	Renato Rascel	"Romantica"	Italian	Renato Rascel; Dino Verde	8
58	13	France	5	Jacqueline Boyer	"Tom Pillibi"	French	Pierre Cour; André Popp	1

Eurovision Song Contest 1961
#	R/O	Country	#	Artist	Song	Language	Songwriter(s)	Placing
59	1	Spain	1	Conchita Bautista	"Estando contigo"	Spanish	Augusto Algueró; Antonio Guijarro	9
60	2	Monaco	3	Colette Deréal	"Allons, allons les enfants"	French	Pierre Delanoë; Hubert Giraud	10
61	3	Austria	5	Jimmy Makulis	"Sehnsucht"	German	Leopold Andrejewitsch	15 ◁
62	4	Finland	1	Laila Kinnunen	"Valoa ikkunassa"	Finnish	Eino Hurme; Sauvo Puhtila	10
63	5	Yugoslavia	1	Ljiljana Petrović	"Neke davne zvezde" (Неке давне звезде)	Serbo-Croatian	Miroslav Antić; Jože Privšek	8
64	6	Netherlands	6	Greetje Kauffeld	"Wat een dag"	Dutch	Pieter Goemans; Dick Schallies	10
65	7	Sweden	4	Lill-Babs	"April, april"	Swedish	Bo Eneby; Bobbie Ericsson	14
66	8	Germany	6	Lale Andersen	"Einmal sehen wir uns wieder"	German, French	Ernst Bader; Rudolf Maluck	13
67	9	France	6	Jean-Paul Mauric	"Printemps (avril carillonne)"	French	Francis Baxter; Guy Favereau	4
68	10	Switzerland	6	Franca di Rienzo	"Nous aurons demain"	French	Émile Gardaz; Géo Voumard	3
69	11	Belgium	6	Bob Benny	"September, gouden roos"	Dutch	Wim Brabants; Hans Flower	15 ◁
70	12	Norway	2	Nora Brockstedt	"Sommer i Palma"	Norwegian	Egil Hagen; Jan Wølner	7
71	13	Denmark	5	Dario Campeotto	"Angelique"	Danish	Aksel V. Rasmussen	5
72	14	Luxembourg	5	Jean-Claude Pascal	"Nous les amoureux"	French	Jacques Datin; Maurice Vidalin	1
73	15	United Kingdom	4	The Allisons	"Are You Sure?"	English	John Alford; Bob Day	2
74	16	Italy	6	Betty Curtis	"Al di là"	Italian	Carlo Donida; Giulio Rapetti	5

Eurovision Song Contest 1962
#	R/O	Country	#	Artist	Song	Language	Songwriter(s)	Placing
75	1	Finland	2	Marion Rung	"Tipi-tii"	Finnish	Kari Tuomisaari	7
76	2	Belgium	7	Fud Leclerc	"Ton nom"	French	Eric Channe; Tony Golan	13 ◁
77	3	Spain	2	Víctor Balaguer	"Llámame"	Spanish	Miguel Portoles; Mario Selles	13 ◁
78	4	Austria	6	Eleonore Schwarz	"Nur in der Wiener Luft"	German	Bruno Uher	13 ◁
79	5	Denmark	6	Ellen Winther	"Vuggevise"	Danish	Kjeld Bonfils; Sejr Volmer-Sørensen	10
80	6	Sweden	5	Inger Berggren	"Sol och vår"	Swedish	Åke Gerhard; Ulf Källqvist	7
81	7	Germany	7	Conny Froboess	"Zwei kleine Italiener"	German	Christian Bruhn; Georg Buschor	6
82	8	Netherlands	7	De Spelbrekers	"Katinka"	Dutch	Henny Hamhuis; Lodewijk Post; Joop Stokkermans	13 ◁
83	9	France	7	Isabelle Aubret	"Un premier amour"	French	Roland Valade; Claude-Henri Vic	1
84	10	Norway	3	Inger Jacobsen	"Kom sol, kom regn"	Norwegian	Ivar Andersen; Kjell Karlsen	10
85	11	Switzerland	7	Jean Philippe	"Le Retour"	French	Émile Gardaz; Géo Voumard	10
86	12	Yugoslavia	2	Lola Novaković	"Ne pali svetla u sumrak" (Не пали светла у сумрак)	Serbo-Croatian	Dragutin Britvić; Jože Privšek	4
87	13	United Kingdom	5	Ronnie Carroll	"Ring-A-Ding Girl"	English	Stan Butcher; Syd Cordell	4
88	14	Luxembourg	6	Camillo Felgen	"Petit bonhomme"	French	Jacques Datin; Maurice Vidalin	3
89	15	Italy	7	Claudio Villa	"Addio, addio"	Italian	Franco Migliacci; Domenico Modugno	9
90	16	Monaco	4	François Deguelt	"Dis rien"	French	Henri Salvador; René Rouzaud	2

Eurovision Song Contest 1963
#	R/O	Country	#	Artist	Song	Language	Songwriter(s)	Placing
91	1	United Kingdom	6	Ronnie Carroll	"Say Wonderful Things"	English	Philip Green; Norman Newell	4
92	2	Netherlands	8	Annie Palmen	"Een speeldoos"	Dutch	Pieter Goemans	13 ◁
93	3	Germany	8	Heidi Brühl	"Marcel"	German	Charly Niessen	9
94	4	Austria	7	Carmela Corren	"Vielleicht geschieht ein Wunder"	German, English	Erwin Halletz; Norman Newell; Peter Wehle	7
95	5	Norway	4	Anita Thallaug	"Solhverv"	Norwegian	Dag Kristoffersen	13 ◁
96	6	Italy	8	Emilio Pericoli	"Uno per tutte"	Italian	Giulio Rapetti; Tony Renis; Alberto Testa	3
97	7	Finland	3	Laila Halme	"Muistojeni laulu"	Finnish	Börje Sundgren	13 ◁
98	8	Denmark	7	Grethe and Jørgen Ingmann	"Dansevise"	Danish	Otto Francker; Sejr Volmer-Sørensen	1
99	9	Yugoslavia	3	Vice Vukov	"Brodovi" (Бродови)	Serbo-Croatian	Mario Nardelli	11
100	10	Switzerland	8	Esther Ofarim	"T'en va pas"	French	Émile Gardaz; Géo Voumard	2
101	11	France	8	Alain Barrière	"Elle était si jolie"	French	Alain Barrière	5
102	12	Spain	3	José Guardiola	"Algo prodigioso"	Spanish	Fernando Garcia Morcillo; Camillo Murillo Janero	12
103	13	Sweden	6	Monica Zetterlund	"En gång i Stockholm"	Swedish	Bobbie Ericsson; Beppe Wolgers	13 ◁
104	14	Belgium	8	Jacques Raymond	"Waarom?"	Dutch	Wim Brabants; Hans Flower	10
105	15	Monaco	5	Françoise Hardy	"L'amour s'en va"	French	Françoise Hardy	5
106	16	Luxembourg	7	Nana Mouskouri	"À force de prier"	French	Raymond Bernard; Pierre Delanoë	8

Eurovision Song Contest 1964
#	R/O	Country	#	Artist	Song	Language	Songwriter(s)	Placing
107	1	Luxembourg	8	Hugues Aufray	"Dès que le printemps revient"	French	Hugues Aufray; Jacques Plante	4
108	2	Netherlands	9	Anneke Grönloh	"Jij bent mijn leven"	Dutch	Ted Powder; René de Vos	10
109	3	Norway	5	Arne Bendiksen	"Spiral"	Norwegian	Egil Hagen; Sigurd Jansen	8
110	4	Denmark	8	Bjørn Tidmand	"Sangen om dig"	Danish	Morgens Dam; Aksel V. Rasmussen	9
111	5	Finland	4	Lasse Mårtenson	"Laiskotellen"	Finnish	Lasse Mårtenson; Sauvo Puhtila	7
112	6	Austria	8	Udo Jürgens	"Warum nur, warum?"	German	Udo Jürgens	6
113	7	France	9	Rachel	"Le Chant de Mallory"	French	Pierre Cour; André Popp	4
114	8	United Kingdom	7	Matt Monro	"I Love the Little Things"	English	Tony Hatch	2
115	9	Germany	9	Nora Nova	"Man gewöhnt sich so schnell an das Schöne"	German	Rudi von der Dovenmühle; Niels Nobach	13 ◁
116	10	Monaco	6	Romuald	"Où sont-elles passées"	French	Pierre Barouh; Francis Lai	3
117	11	Portugal	1	António Calvário	"Oração"	Portuguese	Rogério Braçinha; Francisco Nicholson; João Nobre	13 ◁
118	12	Italy	9	Gigliola Cinquetti	"Non ho l'età"	Italian	Mario Panzeri; Nicola Salerno	1
119	13	Yugoslavia	4	Sabahudin Kurt	"Život je sklopio krug" (Живот је склопио круг)	Serbo-Croatian	Srđan Matijević; Stevan Raičković	13 ◁
120	14	Switzerland	9	Anita Traversi	"I miei pensieri"	Italian	Sanzio Chiesa; Giovanni Pelli	13 ◁
121	15	Belgium	9	Robert Cogoi	"Près de ma rivière"	French	Robert Cogoi	10
122	16	Spain	4	Nelly with Tim and Tony	"Caracola"	Spanish	Fina de Calderón	12

Eurovision Song Contest 1965
#	R/O	Country	#	Artist	Song	Language	Songwriter(s)	Placing
123	1	Netherlands	10	Conny Vandenbos	"Het is genoeg"	Dutch	Johnny Holshuyzen; Karel Prior	11
124	2	United Kingdom	8	Kathy Kirby	"I Belong"	English	Phil Peters; Peter Lee Sterling	2
125	3	Spain	5	Conchita Bautista	"Qué bueno, qué bueno"	Spanish	Antonio Figueroa Egea	15 ◁
126	4	Ireland	1	Butch Moore	"I'm Walking the Streets in the Rain"	English	Teresa Conlon; Joe Harrigan; George Prendergast	6
127	5	Germany	10	Ulla Wiesner	"Paradies, wo bist du?"	German	Hans Blum; Barbara Kist	15 ◁
128	6	Austria	9	Udo Jürgens	"Sag ihr, ich lass sie grüßen"	German	Frank Bohlen; Udo Jürgens	4
129	7	Norway	6	Kirsti Sparboe	"Karusell"	Norwegian	Jolly Kramer-Johansen	13
130	8	Belgium	10	Lize Marke	"Als het weer lente is"	Dutch	Jaak Dreesen; Jef Van den Berg	15 ◁
131	9	Monaco	7	Marjorie Noël	"Va dire à l'amour"	French	Raymond Bernard; Jacques Mareuil	9
132	10	Sweden	7	Ingvar Wixell	"Absent Friend"	English	Alf Henrikson; Dag Wirén	10
133	11	France	10	Guy Mardel	"N'avoue jamais"	French	Françoise Dorin; Guy Mardel	3
134	12	Portugal	2	Simone de Oliveira	"Sol de inverno"	Portuguese	Jeronimo Bragança; Carlos Nóbrega e Sousa	13
135	13	Italy	10	Bobby Solo	"Se piangi, se ridi"	Italian	Gianni Marchetti; Giulio Rapetti; Roberto Satti	5
136	14	Denmark	9	Birgit Brüel	"For din skyld"	Danish	Poul Henningsen; Jørgen Jersild	7
137	15	Luxembourg	9	France Gall	"Poupée de cire, poupée de son"	French	Serge Gainsbourg	1
138	16	Finland	5	Viktor Klimenko	"Aurinko laskee länteen"	Finnish	Reino Helismaa; Toivo Kärki	15 ◁
139	17	Yugoslavia	5	Vice Vukov	"Čežnja" (Чежња)	Serbo-Croatian	Julio Marić; Žarko Roje	12
140	18	Switzerland	10	Yovanna	"Non, à jamais sans toi"	French	Bob Calfati; Jean Charles	8

Eurovision Song Contest 1966
#	R/O	Country	#	Artist	Song	Language	Songwriter(s)	Placing
141	1	Germany	11	Margot Eskens	"Die Zeiger der Uhr"	German	Hans Bradtke; Walter Dobschinski	10
142	2	Denmark	10	Ulla Pia	"Stop – mens legen er go'"	Danish	Erik Kåre	14
143	3	Belgium	11	Tonia	"Un peu de poivre, un peu de sel"	French	Paul Quintens; Phil Van Cauwenbergh	4
144	4	Luxembourg	10	Michèle Torr	"Ce soir je t'attendais"	French	Jacques Chaumelle; Bernard Kesslair	10
145	5	Yugoslavia	6	Berta Ambrož	"Brez besed"	Slovene	Elza Budau; Mojmir Sepe	7
146	6	Norway	7	Åse Kleveland	"Intet er nytt under solen"	Norwegian	Arne Bendiksen	3
147	7	Finland	6	Ann-Christine	"Playboy"	Finnish	Ossi Runne	10
148	8	Portugal	3	Madalena Iglésias	"Ele e ela"	Portuguese	Carlos Canelhas	13
149	9	Austria	10	Udo Jürgens	"Merci, Chérie"	German	Thomas Hörbiger; Udo Jürgens	1
150	10	Sweden	8	Lill Lindfors and Svante Thuresson	"Nygammal vals"	Swedish	Björn Lindroth; Bengt-Arne Wallin	2
151	11	Spain	6	Raphael	"Yo soy aquél"	Spanish	Manuel Alejandro	7
152	12	Switzerland	11	Madeleine Pascal	"Ne vois-tu pas ?"	French	Pierre Brenner; Roland Schweizer	6
153	13	Monaco	8	Téréza	"Bien plus fort"	French	Gérard Bourgeois; Jean-Max Rivière	17 ◁
154	14	Italy	11	Domenico Modugno	"Dio, come ti amo"	Italian	Domenico Modugno	17 ◁
155	15	France	11	Dominique Walter	"Chez nous"	French	Claude Carrère; Jacques Plante	16
156	16	Netherlands	11	Milly Scott	"Fernando en Philippo"	Dutch	Gerrit den Braber; Kees de Bruyn	15
157	17	Ireland	2	Dickie Rock	"Come Back to Stay"	English	Rowland Soper	4
158	18	United Kingdom	9	Kenneth McKellar	"A Man Without Love"	English	Peter Callander; Cyril Ornadel	9

Eurovision Song Contest 1967
#	R/O	Country	#	Artist	Song	Language	Songwriter(s)	Placing
159	1	Netherlands	12	Thérèse Steinmetz	"Ringe-dinge"	Dutch	Gerrit den Braber; Johnny Holshuysen	14
160	2	Luxembourg	11	Vicky	"L'amour est bleu"	French	Pierre Cour; André Popp	4
161	3	Austria	11	Peter Horton	"Warum es hunderttausend Sterne gibt"	German	Karin Bognar; Kurt Peche	14
162	4	France	12	Noëlle Cordier	"Il doit faire beau là-bas"	French	Pierre Delanoë; Hubert Giraud	3
163	5	Portugal	4	Eduardo Nascimento	"O vento mudou"	Portuguese	Nuno Nazareth Fernandes; João Magalhães Pereira	12
164	6	Switzerland	12	Géraldine	"Quel cœur vas-tu briser ?"	French	Daniël Faure; Gérard Gray	17 ◁
165	7	Sweden	9	Östen Warnerbring	"Som en dröm"	Swedish	Patrice Hellberg; Marcus Österdahl; Curt Peterson	8
166	8	Finland	7	Fredi	"Varjoon – suojaan"	Finnish	Lasse Mårtenson; Alvi Vuorinen	12
167	9	Germany	12	Inge Brück	"Anouschka"	German	Hans Blum	8
168	10	Belgium	12	Louis Neefs	"Ik heb zorgen"	Dutch	Paul Quintens; Phil Van Cauwenbergh	7
169	11	United Kingdom	10	Sandie Shaw	"Puppet on a String"	English	Phil Coulter; Bill Martin	1
170	12	Spain	7	Raphael	"Hablemos del amor"	Spanish	Manuel Alejandro	6
171	13	Norway	8	Kirsti Sparboe	"Dukkemann"	Norwegian	Tor Hultin; Ola B. Johannessen	14
172	14	Monaco	9	Minouche Barelli	"Boum-Badaboum"	French	Serge Gainsbourg	5
173	15	Yugoslavia	7	Lado Leskovar	"Vse rože sveta"	Slovene	Urban Koder; Milan Lindič	8
174	16	Italy	12	Claudio Villa	"Non andare più lontano"	Italian	Gino Mescoli; Vito Pallavicini	11
175	17	Ireland	3	Sean Dunphy	"If I Could Choose"	English	Wesley Burrowes; Michael Coffey	2

Eurovision Song Contest 1968
#	R/O	Country	#	Artist	Song	Language	Songwriter(s)	Placing
176	1	Portugal	5	Carlos Mendes	"Verão"	Portuguese	José Alberto Diogo; Pedro Osório	11
177	2	Netherlands	13	Ronnie Tober	"Morgen"	Dutch	Joop Stokkermans; Theo Strengers	16 ◁
178	3	Belgium	13	Claude Lombard	"Quand tu reviendras"	French	Roland Dero; Jo Van Wetter	7
179	4	Austria	12	Karel Gott	"Tausend Fenster"	German	Walter Brandin; Udo Jürgens	13
180	5	Luxembourg	12	Chris Baldo and Sophie Garel	"Nous vivrons d'amour"	French	Jacques Demarny; Carlos Leresche	11
181	6	Switzerland	13	Gianni Mascolo	"Guardando il sole"	Italian	Sanzio Chiesa; Aldo D'Addario	13
182	7	Monaco	10	Line and Willy	"À chacun sa chanson"	French	Jean-Claude Olivier; Roland Valade	7
183	8	Sweden	10	Claes-Göran Hederström	"Det börjar verka kärlek, banne mej"	Swedish	Peter Himmelstrand	5
184	9	Finland	8	Kristina Hautala	"Kun kello käy"	Finnish	Esko Linnavalli; Juha Vainio	16 ◁
185	10	France	13	Isabelle Aubret	"La Source"	French	Guy Bonnet; Henri Dijan; Daniël Faure	3
186	11	Italy	13	Sergio Endrigo	"Marianne"	Italian	Sergio Endrigo	10
187	12	United Kingdom	11	Cliff Richard	"Congratulations"	English	Phil Coulter; Bill Martin	2
188	13	Norway	9	Odd Børre	"Stress"	Norwegian	Tor Hultin; Ola B. Johannessen	13
189	14	Ireland	4	Pat McGeegan	"Chance of a Lifetime"	English	John Kennedy	4
190	15	Spain	8	Massiel	"La La La"	Spanish	Ramón Arcusa; Manuel de la Calva (Dúo Dinámico)	1
191	16	Germany	13	Wencke Myhre	"Ein Hoch der Liebe"	German	Horst Jankowski; Carl J. Schäuble	6
192	17	Yugoslavia	8	Lući Kapurso and Hamo Hajdarhodžić	"Jedan dan" (Један дан)	Serbo-Croatian	Đelo Jusić; Stipica Kalogjera; Stijepo Stražičić	7

Eurovision Song Contest 1969
#	R/O	Country	#	Artist	Song	Language	Songwriter(s)	Placing
193	1	Yugoslavia	9	Ivan	"Pozdrav svijetu" (Поздрав свијету)	Serbo-Croatian	Milan Lentić	13
194	2	Luxembourg	13	Romuald	"Catherine"	French	André Borly; Paul Mauriat; André Pascal	11
195	3	Spain	9	Salomé	"Vivo cantando"	Spanish	Aniano Alcalde; María José de Cerato	1
196	4	Monaco	11	Jean Jacques	"Maman, Maman"	French	Jo Perrier	6
197	5	Ireland	5	Muriel Day	"The Wages of Love"	English	Michael Reade	7
198	6	Italy	14	Iva Zanicchi	"Due grosse lacrime bianche"	Italian	Carlo Daiano; Piero Soffici	13
199	7	United Kingdom	12	Lulu	"Boom Bang-a-Bang"	English	Alan Moorhouse; Peter Warne	1
200	8	Netherlands	14	Lenny Kuhr	"De troubadour"	Dutch	David Hartsema; Lenny Kuhr	1
201	9	Sweden	11	Tommy Körberg	"Judy, min vän"	Swedish	Britt Lindeborg; Roger Wallis	9
202	10	Belgium	14	Louis Neefs	"Jennifer Jennings"	Dutch	Paul Quintens; Phil Van Cauwenbergh	7
203	11	Switzerland	14	Paola	"Bonjour, bonjour"	German	Henry Mayer; Jack Stark	5
204	12	Norway	10	Kirsti Sparboe	"Oj, oj, oj, så glad jeg skal bli"	Norwegian	Arne Bendiksen	16 ◁
205	13	Germany	14	Siw Malmkvist	"Primaballerina"	German	Hans Blum	9
206	14	France	14	Frida Boccara	"Un jour, un enfant"	French	Eddy Marnay; Émile Stern	1
207	15	Portugal	6	Simone de Oliveira	"Desfolhada portuguesa"	Portuguese	Nuno Nazareth Fernandes; José Carlos Ary dos Santos	15
208	16	Finland	9	Jarkko and Laura	"Kuin silloin ennen"	Finnish	Toivo Kärki; Juha Vainio	12

=== 1970s ===
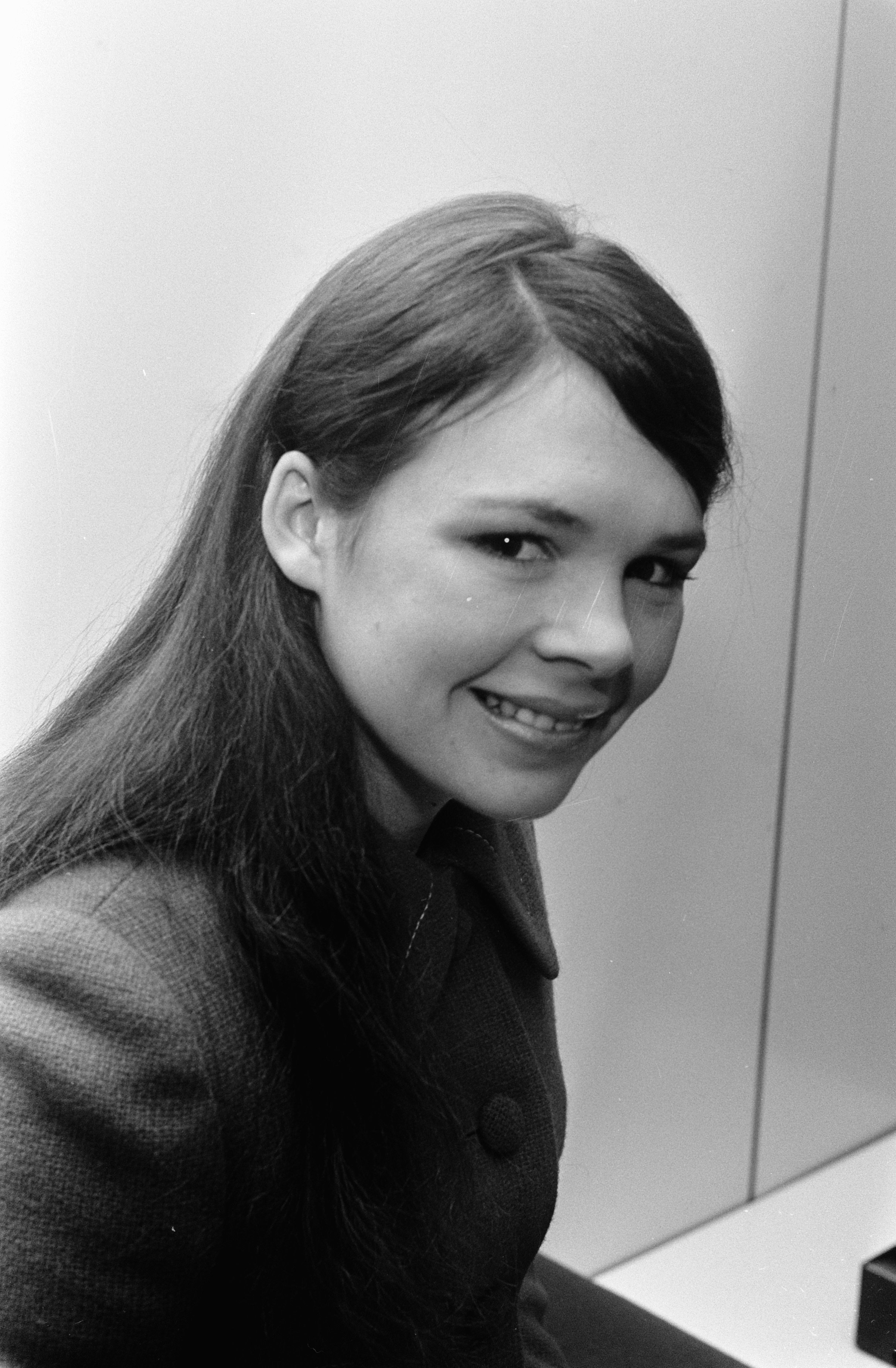
Dana performed the first of a record seven winning entries for Ireland in 1970.

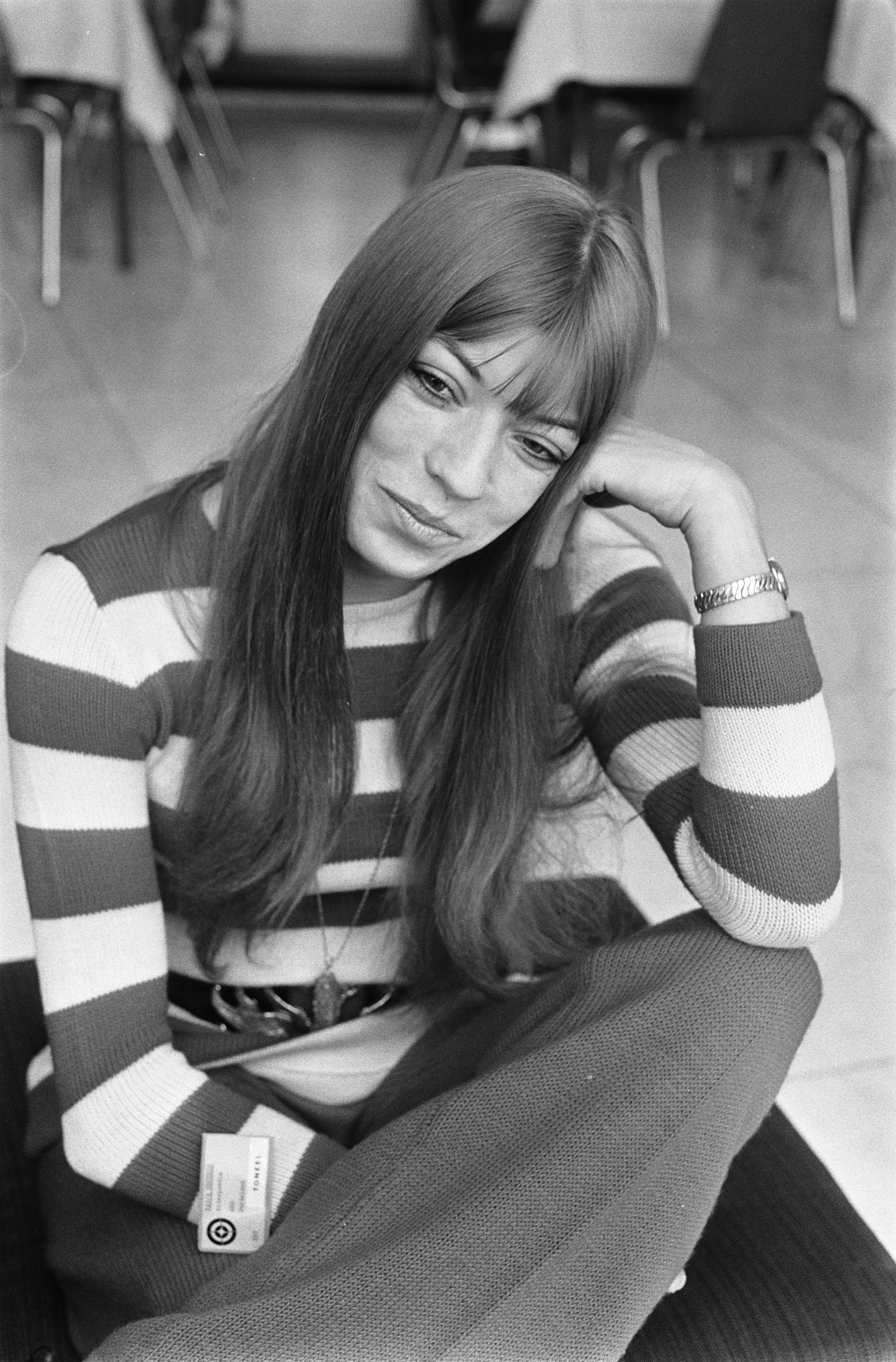
Katja Ebstein performed three Eurovision entries for Germany.

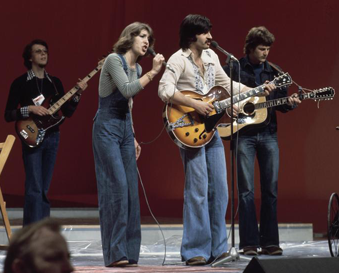
Peter, Sue and Marc made four separate contest appearances for Switzerland in the 1970s and 1980s.

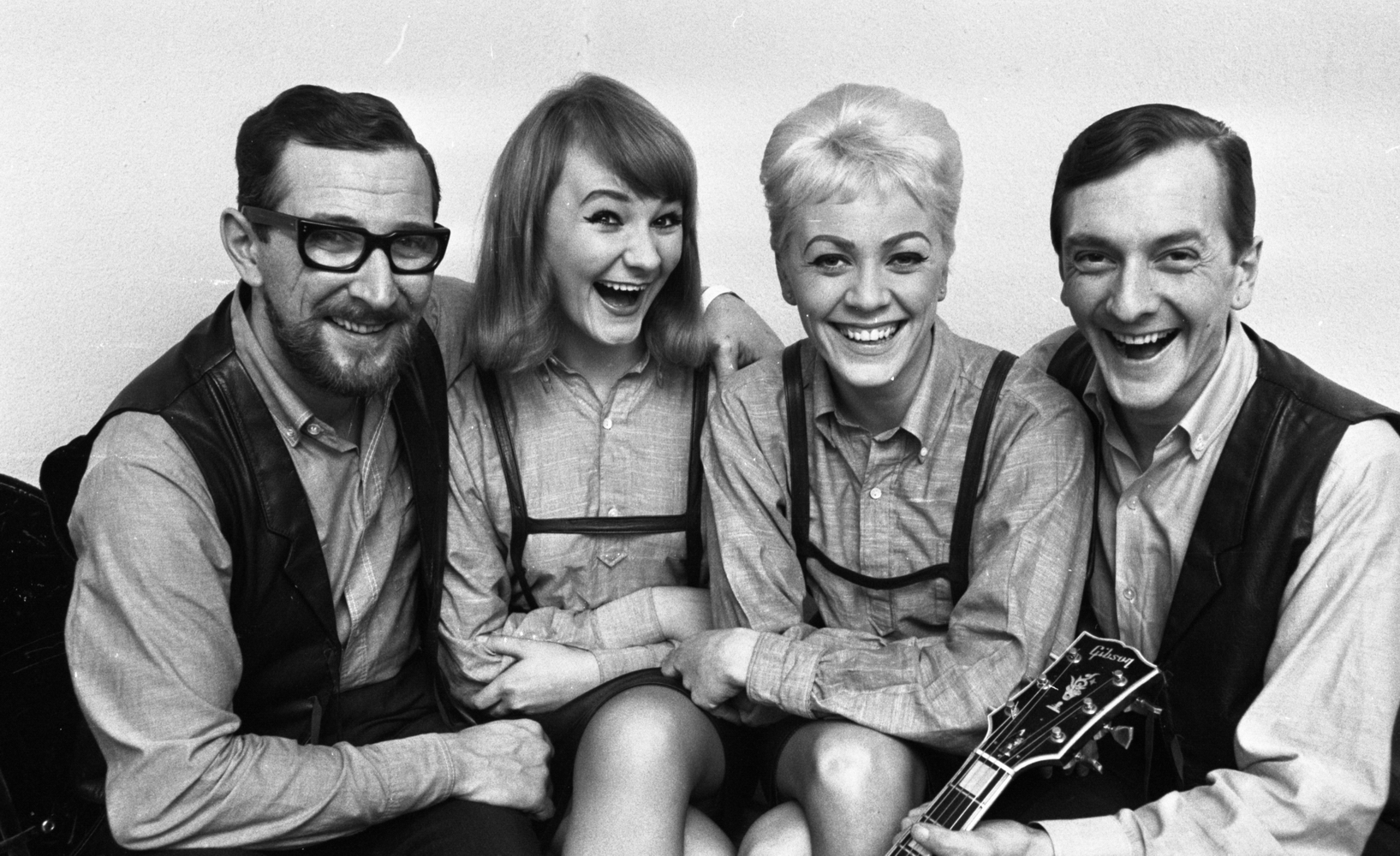
Family Four represented Sweden at two consecutive contests, in 1971 and 1972.

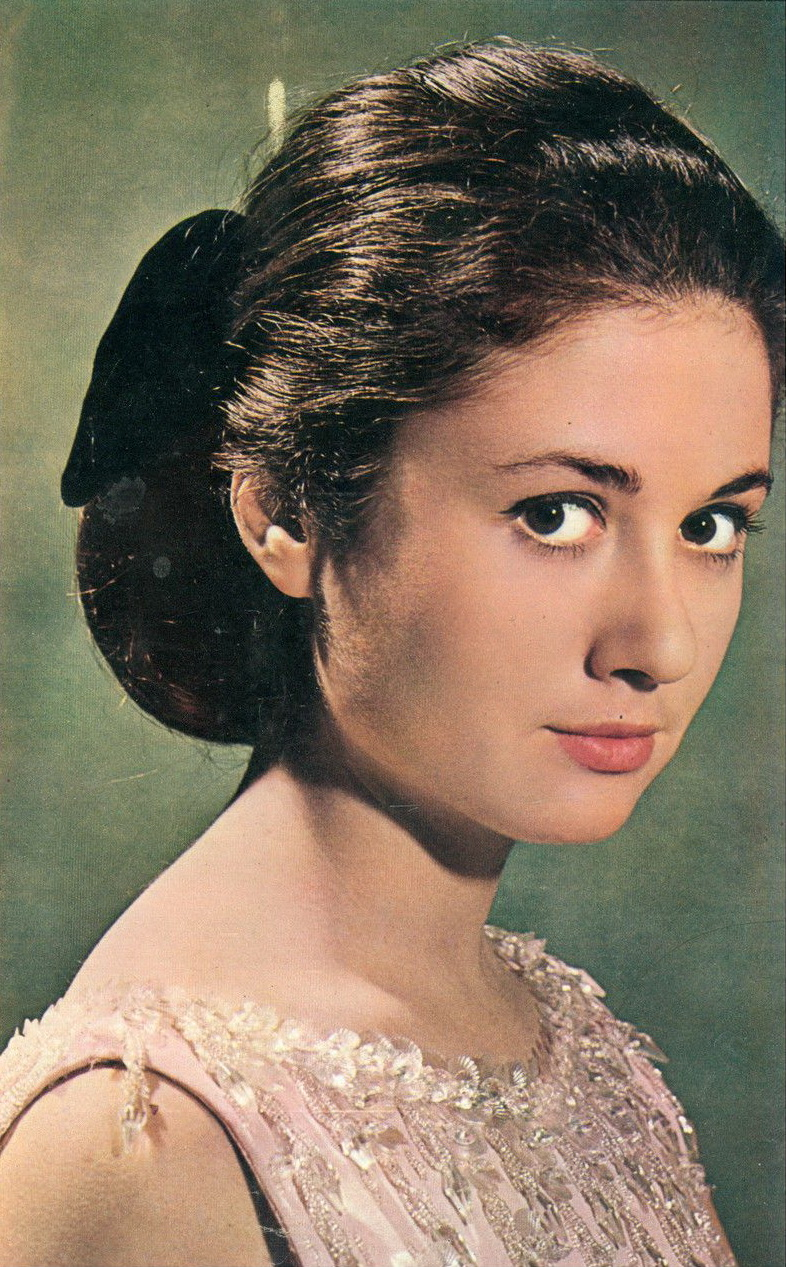
Gigliola Cinquetti performed two Italian entries, winning in 1964 and placing second in 1974.

Eurovision Song Contest 1970
#	R/O	Country	#	Artist	Song	Language	Songwriter(s)	Placing
209	1	Netherlands	15	Patricia and Hearts of Soul	"Waterman"	Dutch	Pieter Goemans	7
210	2	Switzerland	15	Henri Dès	"Retour"	French	Henri Dès	4
211	3	Italy	15	Gianni Morandi	"Occhi di ragazza"	Italian	Gianfranco Baldazzi; Sergio Bardotti; Lucio Dalla	8
212	4	Yugoslavia	10	Eva Sršen	"Pridi, dala ti bom cvet"	Slovene	Mojmir Sepe; Dušan Velkaverh	11
213	5	Belgium	15	Jean Vallée	"Viens l'oublier"	French	Jean Vallée	8
214	6	France	15	Guy Bonnet	"Marie-Blanche"	French	Guy Bonnet; André-Pierre Dousset	4
215	7	United Kingdom	13	Mary Hopkin	"Knock, Knock (Who's There?)"	English	John Carter; Geoff Stephens	2
216	8	Luxembourg	14	David Alexandre Winter	"Je suis tombé du ciel"	French	Eddy Marnay; Yves de Vriendt	12 ◁
217	9	Spain	10	Julio Iglesias	"Gwendolyne"	Spanish	Julio Iglesias	4
218	10	Monaco	12	Dominique Dussault	"Marlène"	French	Eddie Barclay; Henri Dijan; Jimmy Walter	8
219	11	Germany	15	Katja Ebstein	"Wunder gibt es immer wieder"	German	Christian Bruhn; Günter Loose	3
220	12	Ireland	6	Dana	"All Kinds of Everything"	English	Derry Lindsay; Jackie Smith	1

Eurovision Song Contest 1971
#	R/O	Country	#	Artist	Song	Language	Songwriter(s)	Placing
221	1	Austria	13	Marianne Mendt	"Musik"	German (Note: Specifically Viennese German)	Manuel Rigoni; Richard Schönherz	16
222	2	Malta	1	Joe Grech	"Marija l-Maltija"	Maltese	Joe Grech; Charles Misfud	18 ◁
223	3	Monaco	13	Séverine	"Un banc, un arbre, une rue"	French	Jean-Pierre Bourtayre; Yves Dessca	1
224	4	Switzerland	16	Peter, Sue and Marc	"Les Illusions de nos vingt ans"	French	Peter Reber; Maurice Tézé	12
225	5	Germany	16	Katja Ebstein	"Diese Welt"	German	Fred Jay; Dieter Zimmermann	3
226	6	Spain	11	Karina	"En un mundo nuevo"	Spanish	Tony Luz; Rafael Trabucchelli	2
227	7	France	16	Serge Lama	"Un jardin sur la terre"	French	Jacques Demarny; Henri Dijan; Alice Dona	10
228	8	Luxembourg	15	Monique Melsen	"Pomme, pomme, pomme"	French	Pierre Cour; Hubert Giraud	13
229	9	United Kingdom	14	Clodagh Rodgers	"Jack in the Box"	English	David Myers; John Worsley	4
230	10	Belgium	16	Jacques Raymond and Lily Castel	"Goeie morgen, morgen"	Dutch	Paul Quintens; Phil Van Cauwenbergh	14
231	11	Italy	16	Massimo Ranieri	"L'amore è un attimo"	Italian	Giancarlo Bigazzi; Enrico Polito; Gaetano Savio	5
232	12	Sweden	12	The Family Four	"Vita vidder"	Swedish	Håkan Elmquist	6
233	13	Ireland	7	Angela Farrell	"One Day Love"	English	Ita Flynn; Donald Martin	11
234	14	Netherlands	16	Saskia and Serge	"Tijd"	Dutch	Gerrit den Braber; Joop Stokkermans	6
235	15	Portugal	7	Tonicha	"Menina do alto da serra"	Portuguese	Nuno Nazareth Fernandes; José Carlos Ary dos Santos	9
236	16	Yugoslavia	11	Krunoslav Slabinac	"Tvoj dječak je tužan" (Твој дјечак је тужан)	Serbo-Croatian	Zvonimir Golob; Ivan Krajač	14
237	17	Finland	10	Markku Aro and Koivisto Sisters	"Tie uuteen päivään"	Finnish	Rauno Lehtinen	8
238	18	Norway	11	Hanne Krogh	"Lykken er"	Norwegian	Arne Bendiksen	17

Eurovision Song Contest 1972
#	R/O	Country	#	Artist	Song	Language	Songwriter(s)	Placing
239	1	Germany	17	Mary Roos	"Nur die Liebe läßt uns leben"	German	Joachim Heider; Joachim Relin	3
240	2	France	17	Betty Mars	"Comé-comédie"	French	Frédéric Botton	11
241	3	Ireland	8	Sandie Jones	"Ceol an Ghrá"	Irish	Joe Burkett; Liam Mac Uistín	15
242	4	Spain	12	Jaime Morey	"Amanece"	Spanish	Augusto Algueró; Ramón Arcusa	10
243	5	United Kingdom	15	The New Seekers	"Beg, Steal or Borrow"	English	Tony Cole; Graeme Hall; Steve Wolfe	2
244	6	Norway	12	Grethe Kausland and Benny Borg	"Småting"	Norwegian	Ivar Børsum; Kåre Grøttum	14
245	7	Portugal	8	Carlos Mendes	"A festa da vida"	Portuguese	José Calvário; José Niza	7
246	8	Switzerland	17	Véronique Müller	"C'est la chanson de mon amour"	French	Catherine Desage; Véronique Müller	8
247	9	Malta	2	Helen and Joseph	"L-imħabba"	Maltese	Charles Camilleri; Albert Cassola	18 ◁
248	10	Finland	11	Päivi Paunu and Kim Floor	"Muistathan"	Finnish	Juha Flinck; Nacke Johansson	12
249	11	Austria	14	The Milestones	"Falter im Wind"	German	Manuel Rigoni; Richard Schönherz; Heinz Unger	5
250	12	Italy	17	Nicola Di Bari	"I giorni dell'arcobaleno"	Italian	Nicola Di Bari; Dalmazio Masini; Piero Pintucci	6
251	13	Yugoslavia	12	Tereza	"Muzika i ti" (Музика и ти)	Serbo-Croatian	Nikica Kalogjera; Ivan Krajač	9
252	14	Sweden	13	The Family Four	"Härliga sommardag"	Swedish	Håkan Elmquist	13
253	15	Monaco	14	Anne-Marie Godart and Peter McLane	"Comme on s'aime"	French	Raymond Bernard; Jean Dréjac	16
254	16	Belgium	17	Serge and Christine Ghisoland	"À la folie ou pas du tout"	French	Bob Milan; Daniel Nélis	17
255	17	Luxembourg	16	Vicky Leandros	"Après toi"	French	Yves Dessca; Klaus Munro; Mario Panas	1
256	18	Netherlands	17	Sandra and Andres	"Als het om de liefde gaat"	Dutch	Hans van Hemert; Dries Holten	4

Eurovision Song Contest 1973
#	R/O	Country	#	Artist	Song	Language	Songwriter(s)	Placing
257	1	Finland	12	Marion Rung	"Tom Tom Tom"	English	Bob Barratt; Rauno Lehtinen	6
258	2	Belgium	18	Nicole and Hugo	"Baby Baby"	Dutch	Ignace Baert; Erik Marijsse	17 ◁
259	3	Portugal	9	Fernando Tordo	"Tourada"	Portuguese	José Carlos Ary dos Santos; Fernando Tordo	10
260	4	Germany	18	Gitte	"Junger Tag"	German	Stephan Lego; Günther-Eric Thöner	8
261	5	Norway	13	Bendik Singers	"It's Just a Game"	English, French	Arne Bendiksen; Bob Williams	7
262	6	Monaco	15	Marie	"Un train qui part"	French	Boris Bergman; Bernard Liamis	8
263	7	Spain	13	Mocedades	"Eres tú"	Spanish	Juan Carlos Calderón	2
264	8	Switzerland	18	Patrick Juvet	"Je vais me marier, Marie"	French	Pierre Delanoë; Patrick Juvet	12
265	9	Yugoslavia	13	Zdravko Čolić	"Gori vatra" (Гори ватра)	Serbo-Croatian	Kemal Monteno	15
266	10	Italy	18	Massimo Ranieri	"Chi sarà con te"	Italian	Giancarlo Bigazzi; Enrico Polito; Gaetano Savio	13
267	11	Luxembourg	17	Anne-Marie David	"Tu te reconnaîtras"	French	Vline Buggy; Claude Morgan	1
268	12	Sweden	14	The Nova	"You're Summer"	English	Carl-Axel Dominique; Monica Dominique; Lars Forssell	5
269	13	Netherlands	18	Ben Cramer	"De oude muzikant"	Dutch	Pierre Kartner	14
270	14	Ireland	9	Maxi	"Do I Dream"	English	Jack Brierley; George F. Crosbie	10
271	15	United Kingdom	16	Cliff Richard	"Power to All Our Friends"	English	Guy Fletcher; Doug Flett	3
272	16	France	18	Martine Clémenceau	"Sans toi"	French	Anne Grégory; Paul Koulak	15
273	17	Israel	1	Ilanit	"Ey Sham" (אי שם)	Hebrew	Nurit Hirsh; Ehud Manor	4

Eurovision Song Contest 1974
#	R/O	Country	#	Artist	Song	Language	Songwriter(s)	Placing
274	1	Finland	13	Carita	"Keep Me Warm"	English	Eero Koivistoinen; Frank Robson	13
275	2	United Kingdom	17	Olivia Newton-John	"Long Live Love"	English	Valerie Avon; Harold Spiro	4
276	3	Spain	14	Peret	"Canta y sé feliz"	Spanish	Pedro Pubill Calaf	9
277	4	Norway	14	Anne-Karine and the Bendik Singers	"The First Day of Love"	English	Philip Kruse; Frode Thingnæs	14 ◁
278	5	Greece	1	Marinella	"Krassi, thalassa ke t' agori mou" (Κρασί, θάλασσα και τ' αγόρι μου)	Greek	Giorgos Katsaros; Pythagoras	11
279	6	Israel	2	Poogy	"Natati La Khaiai" (נתתי לה חיי)	Hebrew	Alon Oleartchik; Danny Sanderson	7
280	7	Yugoslavia	14	Korni Grupa	"Generacija '42" (Генерација '42)	Serbo-Croatian	Kornelije Kovač	12
281	8	Sweden	15	ABBA	"Waterloo"	English	Stig Anderson; Benny Andersson; Björn Ulvaeus	1
282	9	Luxembourg	18	Ireen Sheer	"Bye Bye I Love You"	French	Humbert Ibach; Michael Kunze; Ralph Siegel	4
283	10	Monaco	16	Romuald	"Celui qui reste et celui qui s'en va"	French	Jean-Pierre Bourtayre; Michel Jourdan	4
284	11	Belgium	19	Jacques Hustin	"Fleur de liberté"	French	Franck F. Gérald; Jacques Hustin	9
285	12	Netherlands	19	Mouth and MacNeal	"I See a Star"	English	Gerrit den Braber; Hans van Hemert	3
286	13	Ireland	10	Tina Reynolds	"Cross Your Heart"	English	Paul Lyttle	7
287	14	Germany	19	Cindy and Bert	"Die Sommermelodie"	German	Kurt Feltz; Werner Scharfenberger	14 ◁
288	15	Switzerland	19	Piera Martell	"Mein Ruf nach dir"	German	Pepe Ederer	14 ◁
289	16	Portugal	10	Paulo de Carvalho	"E depois do adeus"	Portuguese	José Calvário; José Niza	14 ◁
290	17	Italy	19	Gigliola Cinquetti	"Sì"	Italian	Carrado Conti; Daniele Pace; Mario Panzeri; Laurenzo Pilat	2

Eurovision Song Contest 1975
#	R/O	Country	#	Artist	Song	Language	Songwriter(s)	Placing
291	1	Netherlands	20	Teach-In	"Ding-a-dong"	English	Dick Bakker; Will Luikinga; Eddy Ouwens	1
292	2	Ireland	11	The Swarbriggs	"That's What Friends Are For"	English	Jimmy Swarbrigg; Tommy Swarbrigg	9
293	3	France	19	Nicole	"Et bonjour à toi l'artiste"	French	Jeff Barnel; Pierre Delanoë	4
294	4	Germany	20	Joy Fleming	"Ein Lied kann eine Brücke sein"	German, English	Michael Holm; Rainer Pietsch	17
295	5	Luxembourg	19	Géraldine	"Toi"	French	Phil Coulter; Pierre Cour; Bill Martin	5
296	6	Norway	15	Ellen Nikolaysen	"Touch My Life with Summer"	English	Svein Hundnes	18
297	7	Switzerland	20	Simone Drexel	"Mikado"	German	Simone Drexel	6
298	8	Yugoslavia	15	Pepel in kri	"Dan ljubezni"	Slovene	Tadej Hrušovar; Dušan Velkaverh	13
299	9	United Kingdom	18	The Shadows	"Let Me Be the One"	English	Paul Curtis	2
300	10	Malta	3	Renato	"Singing This Song"	English	Sammy Galea; M. Iris Mifsud	12
301	11	Belgium	20	Ann Christy	"Gelukkig zijn"	Dutch, English	Mary Boduin	15
302	12	Israel	3	Shlomo Artzi	"At Ve'Ani" (את ואני)	Hebrew	Shlomo Artzi; Ehud Manor	11
303	13	Turkey	1	Semiha Yankı	"Seninle Bir Dakika"	Turkish	Hikmet Münir Ebcioğlu; Kemal Ebcioğlu	19 ◁
304	14	Monaco	17	Sophie	"Une chanson c'est une lettre"	French	Boris Bergman; André Popp	13
305	15	Finland	14	Pihasoittajat	"Old Man Fiddle"	English	Hannu Karlsson; Kim Kuusi; Arthur Ridgway Spencer	7
306	16	Portugal	11	Duarte Mendes	"Madrugada"	Portuguese	José Luis Tinoco	16
307	17	Spain	15	Sergio and Estíbaliz	"Tú volverás"	Spanish	Juan Carlos Calderón	10
308	18	Sweden	16	Lars Berghagen	"Jennie, Jennie"	English	Lars Berghagen	8
309	19	Italy	20	Wess and Dori Ghezzi	"Era"	Italian	Andrea Lo Vecchio; Shel Shapiro	3

Eurovision Song Contest 1976
#	R/O	Country	#	Artist	Song	Language	Songwriter(s)	Placing
310	1	United Kingdom	19	Brotherhood of Man	"Save Your Kisses for Me"	English	Tony Hiller; Martin Lee; Lee Sheriden	1
311	2	Switzerland	21	Peter, Sue and Marc	"Djambo Djambo"	English	Peter Reber	4
312	3	Germany	21	Les Humphries Singers	"Sing, Sang, Song"	German	Kurt Hertha; Ralph Siegel	15
313	4	Israel	4	Chocolate, Menta, Mastik	"Emor Shalom" (אמור שלום)	Hebrew	Matti Caspi; Ehud Manor	6
314	5	Luxembourg	20	Jürgen Marcus	"Chansons pour ceux qui s'aiment"	French	Vline Buggy; Fred Jay; Jack White	14
315	6	Belgium	21	Pierre Rapsat	"Judy et Cie"	French	Pierre Rapsat; Eric Van Hulse	8
316	7	Ireland	12	Red Hurley	"When"	English	Brendan Graham	10
317	8	Netherlands	21	Sandra Reemer	"The Party Is Over Now"	English	Hans van Hemert	9
318	9	Norway	16	Anne-Karine Strøm	"Mata Hari"	English	Philip Kruse; Frode Thingnæs	18 ◁
319	10	Greece	2	Mariza Koch	"Panaghia mou, panaghia mou" (Παναγιά μου, Παναγιά μου)	Greek	Mihalis Fotiades; Mariza Koch	13
320	11	Finland	15	Fredi and the Friends	"Pump-Pump"	English	Pertti Reponen; Matti Siitonen	11
321	12	Spain	16	Braulio	"Sobran las palabras"	Spanish	Braulio García Bautista	16
322	13	Italy	21	Romina and Al Bano	"We'll Live It All Again"	English, Italian	Albano Carrisi; Detto Mariano; Romina Power	7
323	14	Austria	15	Waterloo and Robinson	"My Little World"	English	Gerhard Heinz	5
324	15	Portugal	12	Carlos do Carmo	"Uma flor de verde pinho"	Portuguese	Manuel Alegre; José Niza	12
325	16	Monaco	18	Mary Christy	"Toi, la musique et moi"	French	Georges Costa; Gilbert Sinoué	3
326	17	France	20	Catherine Ferry	"Un, deux, trois"	French	Jean-Paul Cara; Tony Rallo	2
327	18	Yugoslavia	16	Ambasadori	"Ne mogu skriti svoju bol" (Не могу скрити своју бол)	Serbo-Croatian	Slobodan Đurasović; Slobodan Vujović	17

Eurovision Song Contest 1977
#	R/O	Country	#	Artist	Song	Language	Songwriter(s)	Placing
328	1	Ireland	13	The Swarbriggs Plus Two	"It's Nice to Be in Love Again"	English	Jimmy Swarbrigg; Tommy Swarbrigg	3
329	2	Monaco	19	Michèle Torr	"Une petite française"	French	Jean Albertini; Paul de Senneville; Olivier Toussaint	4
330	3	Netherlands	22	Heddy Lester	"De mallemolen"	Dutch	Frank Affolter; Wim Hogenkamp	12
331	4	Austria	16	Schmetterlinge	"Boom Boom Boomerang"	German	Georg Herrnstadt; E. Lukas Resetarits; Willi Resetarits; Herbert Zöchling-Tampier	17
332	5	Norway	17	Anita Skorgan	"Casanova"	Norwegian	Dag Nordtømme; Svein Strugstad	14
333	6	Germany	22	Silver Convention	"Telegram"	English	Michael Kunze; Sylvester Levay	8
334	7	Luxembourg	21	Anne-Marie B	"Frère Jacques"	French	Guy Béart; Pierre Cour	16
335	8	Portugal	13	Os Amigos	"Portugal no coração"	Portuguese	José Carlos Ary dos Santos; Fernando Tordo	14
336	9	United Kingdom	20	Lynsey de Paul and Mike Moran	"Rock Bottom"	English	Mike Moran; Lynsey de Paul	2
337	10	Greece	3	Pascalis, Marianna, Robert and Bessy	"Mathema solfege" (Μάθημα σολφέζ)	Greek	Giorgos Hatzinasios; Sevi Tiliakou	5
338	11	Israel	5	Ilanit	"Ahava Hi Shir Lishnayim" (אהבה היא שיר לשניים)	Hebrew	Edna Peleg; Eldad Shrem	11
339	12	Switzerland	22	Pepe Lienhard Band	"Swiss Lady"	German	Peter Reber	6
340	13	Sweden	17	Forbes	"Beatles"	Swedish	Sven-Olof Bagge; Claes Bure	18 ◁
341	14	Spain	17	Micky	"Enséñame a cantar"	Spanish	Fernando Arbex	9
342	15	Italy	22	Mia Martini	"Libera"	Italian	Luigi Albertelli; Salvatore Fabrizio	13
343	16	Finland	16	Monica Aspelund	"Lapponia"	Finnish	Monica Aspelund; Aarno Raninen	10
344	17	Belgium	22	Dream Express	"A Million in One, Two, Three"	English	Luc Smets	7
345	18	France	21	Marie Myriam	"L'Oiseau et l'Enfant"	French	Jean-Paul Cara; Joe Garcy	1

Eurovision Song Contest 1978
#	R/O	Country	#	Artist	Song	Language	Songwriter(s)	Placing
346	1	Ireland	14	Colm C. T. Wilkinson	"Born to Sing"	English	Colm C. T. Wilkinson	5
347	2	Norway	18	Jahn Teigen	"Mil etter mil"	Norwegian	Kai Eide	20 ◁
348	3	Italy	23	Ricchi e Poveri	"Questo amore"	Italian	Sergio Bardotti; Dario Farina; Mauro Lusini	12
349	4	Finland	17	Seija Simola	"Anna rakkaudelle tilaisuus"	Finnish	Reijo Karvonen; Seija Simola	18
350	5	Portugal	14	Gemini	"Dai li dou"	Portuguese	Vítor Mamede; Carlos Quintas	17
351	6	France	22	Joël Prévost	"Il y aura toujours des violons"	French	Didier Barbelivien; Gérard Stern	3
352	7	Spain	18	José Vélez	"Bailemos un vals"	Spanish	Ramón Arcusa; Manuel de la Calva (Dúo Dinámico)	9
353	8	United Kingdom	21	Co-Co	"The Bad Old Days"	English	Stephanie De Sykes; Stuart Slater	11
354	9	Switzerland	23	Carole Vinci	"Vivre"	French	Pierre Alain; Alain Morisod	9
355	10	Belgium	23	Jean Vallée	"L'amour ça fait chanter la vie"	French	Jean Vallée	2
356	11	Netherlands	23	Harmony	"'t Is OK"	Dutch	Toon Gispen; Dick Kooiman; Eddy Ouwens	13
357	12	Turkey	2	Nilüfer and Nazar	"Sevince"	Turkish	Hulki Aktunç; Dağhan Baydur; Onno Tunç	18
358	13	Germany	23	Ireen Sheer	"Feuer"	German	Jean Frankfurter; John Möring	6
359	14	Monaco	20	Caline and Olivier Toussaint	"Les Jardins de Monaco"	French	Jean Albertini; Didier Barbelivien; Paul de Senneville; Olivier Toussaint	4
360	15	Greece	4	Tania Tsanaklidou	"Charlie Chaplin" (Τσάρλυ Τσάπλιν)	Greek	Sakis Tsilikis; Yiannis Xanthoulis	8
361	16	Denmark	11	Mabel	"Boom Boom"	Danish	Christian Have; Andy Kulmbak; Peter Nielsen; Michael Trempenau	16
362	17	Luxembourg	22	Baccara	"Parlez-vous français ?"	French	Frank Dostal; Rolf Soja; Peter Zentner	7
363	18	Israel	6	Izhar Cohen and the Alphabeta	"A-Ba-Ni-Bi" (א-ב-ני-בי)	Hebrew	Nurit Hirsh; Ehud Manor	1
364	19	Austria	17	Springtime	"Mrs. Caroline Robinson"	German	Gerhard Markel; Walter Markel; Norbert Niedermayer	15
365	20	Sweden	18	Björn Skifs	"Det blir alltid värre framåt natten"	Swedish	Peter Himmelstrand	14

Eurovision Song Contest 1979
#	R/O	Country	#	Artist	Song	Language	Songwriter(s)	Placing
366	1	Portugal	15	Manuela Bravo	"Sobe, sobe, balão sobe"	Portuguese	Carlos Nóbrega e Sousa	9
367	2	Italy	24	Matia Bazar	"Raggio di luna"	Italian	Piero Cassano; Giancarlo Golzi; Carlo Marrale; Antonella Ruggiero; Salvatore Stellita	15
368	3	Denmark	12	Tommy Seebach	"Disco Tango"	Danish	Keld Heick; Tommy Seebach	6
369	4	Ireland	15	Cathal Dunne	"Happy Man"	English	Cathal Dunne	5
370	5	Finland	18	Katri Helena	"Katson sineen taivaan"	Finnish	Vexi Salmi; Matti Siitonen	14
371	6	Monaco	21	Laurent Vaguener	"Notre vie c'est la musique"	French	Jean Albertini; Didier Barbelivien; Jean Baudlot; Paul de Senneville	16
372	7	Greece	5	Elpida	"Socrates" (Σωκράτη)	Greek	Doros Georgiades; Sotia Tsotou	8
373	8	Switzerland	24	Peter, Sue and Marc, Pfuri, Gorps and Kniri	"Trödler und Co."	German	Peter Reber	10
374	9	Germany	24	Dschinghis Khan	"Dschinghis Khan"	German	Bernd Meinunger; Ralph Siegel	4
375	10	Israel	7	Milk and Honey	"Hallelujah" (הללויה)	Hebrew	Shimrit Orr; Kobi Oshrat	1
376	11	France	23	Anne-Marie David	"Je suis l'enfant soleil"	French	Hubert Giraud; Eddy Marnay	3
377	12	Belgium	24	Micha Marah	"Hey Nana"	Dutch	Guy Beyers; Charles Dumolin	18 ◁
378	13	Luxembourg	23	Jeane Manson	"J'ai déjà vu ça dans tes yeux"	French	Jean Renard	13
379	14	Netherlands	24	Xandra	"Colorado"	Dutch	Rob Bolland; Ferdi Bolland; Gerard Cox	12
380	15	Sweden	19	Ted	"Satellit"	Swedish	Kenneth Gärdestad; Ted Gärdestad	17
381	16	Norway	19	Anita Skorgan	"Oliver"	Norwegian	Philip Kruse; Anita Skorgan	11
382	17	United Kingdom	22	Black Lace	"Mary Ann"	English	Peter Morris	7
383	18	Austria	18	Christina Simon	"Heute in Jerusalem"	German	André Heller; Peter Wolf	18 ◁
384	19	Spain	19	Betty Missiego	"Su canción"	Spanish	Fernando Moreno	2

=== 1980s ===
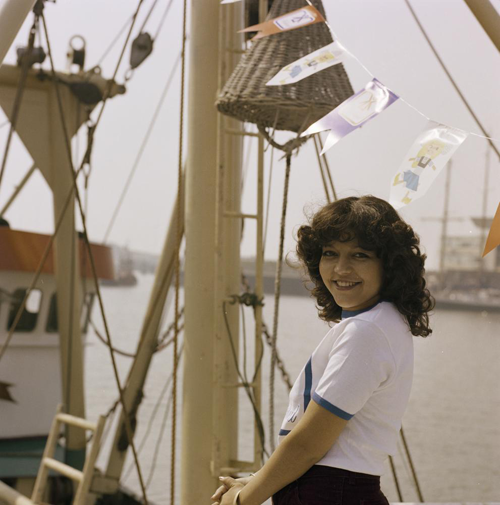
In 1980 Morocco's Samira Bensaïd performed the first, and as of 2025, the only Eurovision entry from an African country.

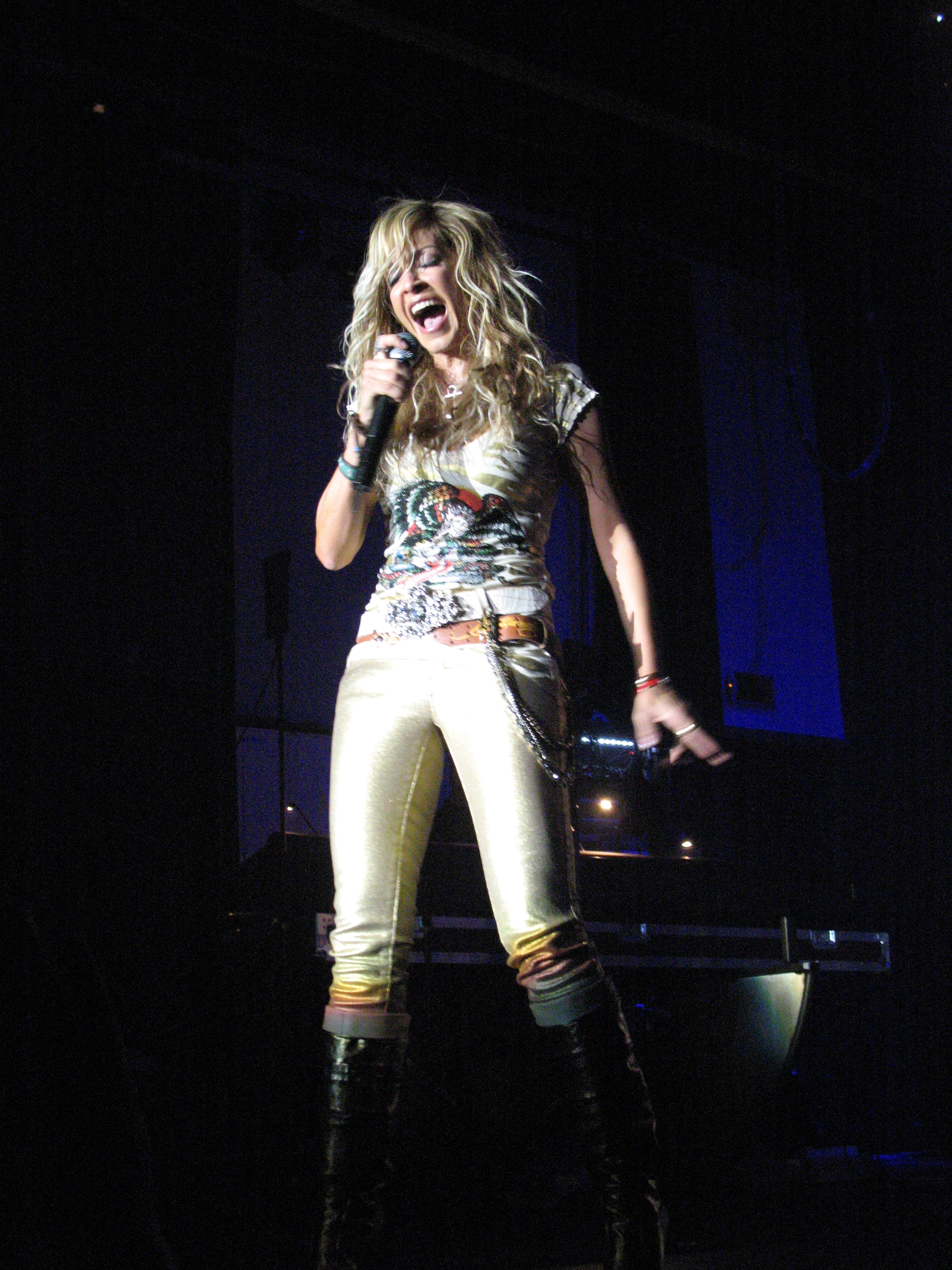
Anna Vissi competed at Eurovision three times for both Greece and Cyprus.

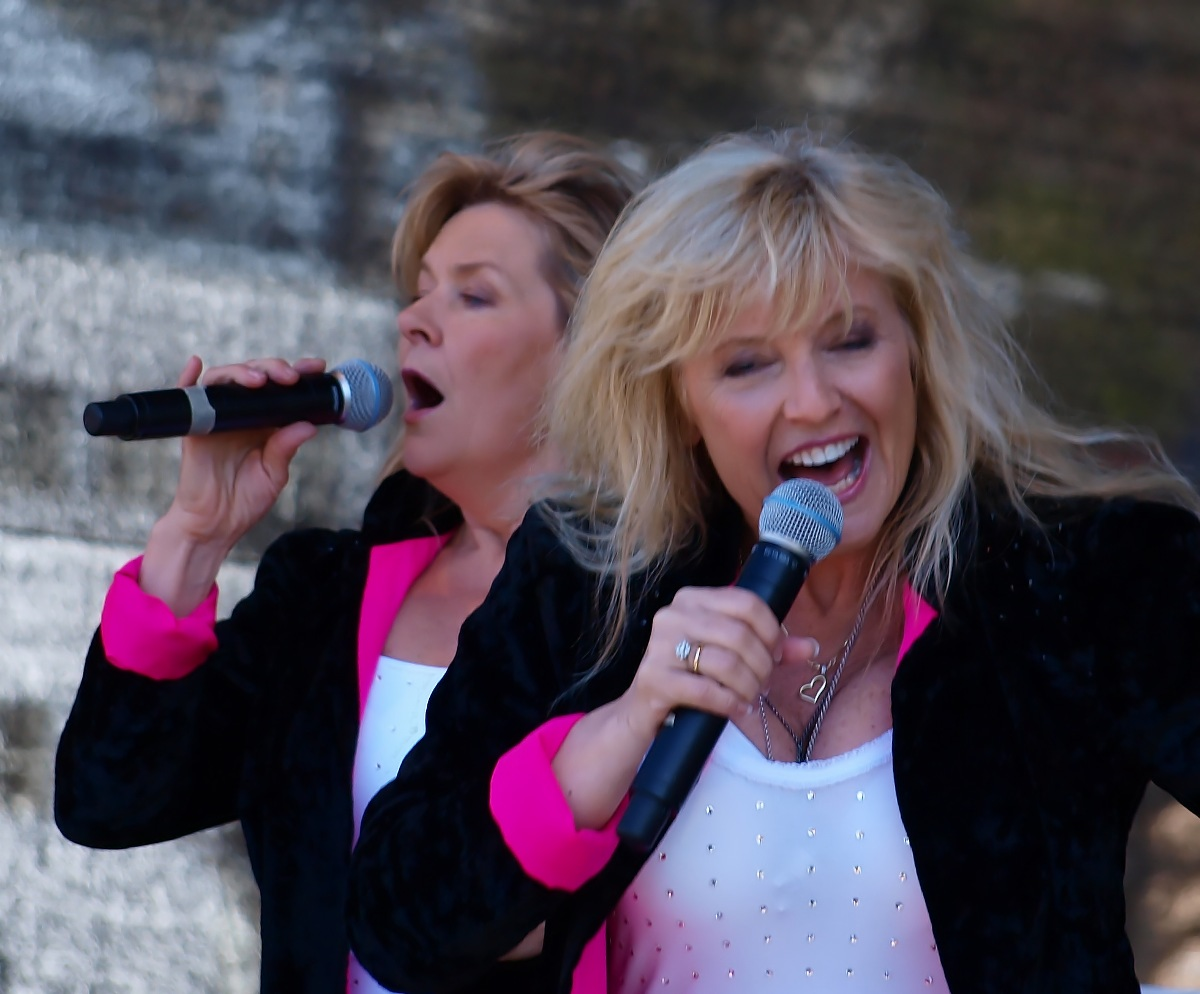
Bobbysocks! were the first Norwegian act to win the contest in 1985.

Eurovision Song Contest 1980
#	R/O	Country	#	Artist	Song	Language	Songwriter(s)	Placing
385	1	Austria	19	Blue Danube	"Du bist Musik"	German	Klaus-Peter Sattler	8
386	2	Turkey	3	Ajda Pekkan	"Pet'r Oil"	Turkish	Attila Özdemiroğlu; Şanar Yurdatapan	15
387	3	Greece	6	Anna Vissi and the Epikouri	"Autostop" (Ωτοστόπ)	Greek	Jick Nacassian; Rony Sofou	13
388	4	Luxembourg	24	Sophie and Magaly	"Papa Pingouin"	French	Jean-Paul Cara; Pierre Delanoë; Bernd Meinunger; Ralph Siegel	9
389	5	Morocco	1	Samira Bensaïd	"Bitakat Hob" (بطاقة حب)	Arabic	Abdel Ati Amenna; Malou Rouanne	18
390	6	Italy	25	Alan Sorrenti	"Non so che darei"	Italian	Alan Sorrenti	6
391	7	Denmark	13	Bamses Venner	"Tænker altid på dig"	Danish	Bjarne Gren Jensen; Flemming Jørgensen	14
392	8	Sweden	20	Tomas Ledin	"Just nu"	Swedish	Tomas Ledin	10
393	9	Switzerland	25	Paola	"Cinéma"	French	Véronique Müller; Peter Reber	4
394	10	Finland	19	Vesa-Matti Loiri	"Huilumies"	Finnish	Aarno Raninen; Vexi Salmi	19 ◁
395	11	Norway	20	Sverre Kjelsberg and Mattis Hætta	"Sámiid ædnan"	Norwegian	Sverre Kjelsberg; Ragnar Olsen	16
396	12	Germany	25	Katja Ebstein	"Theater"	German	Bernd Meinunger; Ralph Siegel	2
397	13	United Kingdom	23	Prima Donna	"Love Enough for Two"	English	Stephanie De Sykes; Stuart Slater	3
398	14	Portugal	16	José Cid	"Um grande, grande amor"	Portuguese	José Cid	7
399	15	Netherlands	25	Maggie MacNeal	"Amsterdam"	Dutch	Alex Alberts; Frans Smit; Sjoukje Smit; Robert Verwey	5
400	16	France	24	Profil	"Hé, hé m'sieurs dames"	French	Richard de Bordeaux; Richard Joffo; Sylvano Santorio	11
401	17	Ireland	16	Johnny Logan	"What's Another Year"	English	Shay Healy	1
402	18	Spain	20	Trigo Limpio	"Quédate esta noche"	Spanish	José Antonio Martín	12
403	19	Belgium	25	Telex	"Euro-Vision"	French	Dan Lacksman; Michel Moers; Marc Moulin	17

Eurovision Song Contest 1981
#	R/O	Country	#	Artist	Song	Language	Songwriter(s)	Placing
404	1	Austria	20	Marty Brem	"Wenn du da bist"	German	Werner Böhmler	17
405	2	Turkey	4	Modern Folk Trio and Ayşegül	"Dönme Dolap"	Turkish	Ali Kocatepe	18
406	3	Germany	26	Lena Valaitis	"Johnny Blue"	German	Bernd Meinunger; Ralph Siegel	2
407	4	Luxembourg	25	Jean-Claude Pascal	"C'est peut-être pas l'Amérique"	French	Sophie Makhno; Jean-Claude Petit; Jean-Claude Villeminot	11
408	5	Israel	8	Habibi	"Halayla" (הלילה)	Hebrew	Shlomit Aharon; Yuval Dor; Shuki Levy	7
409	6	Denmark	14	Tommy Seebach and Debbie Cameron	"Krøller eller ej"	Danish	Keld Heick; Tommy Seebach	11
410	7	Yugoslavia	17	Seid Memić Vajta	"Lejla" (Лејла)	Serbo-Croatian	Ranko Boban	15
411	8	Finland	20	Riki Sorsa	"Reggae O.K."	Finnish	Olli Ojala; Jim Pembroke	16
412	9	France	25	Jean Gabilou	"Humanahum"	French	Jean-Paul Cara; Joe Gracy	3
413	10	Spain	21	Bacchelli	"Y sólo tú"	Spanish	Amado Jaén	14
414	11	Netherlands	26	Linda Williams	"Het is een wonder"	Dutch	Bart van der Laar; Cees de Wit	9
415	12	Ireland	17	Sheeba	"Horoscopes"	English	Joe Burkett; Jim Kelly	5
416	13	Norway	21	Finn Kalvik	"Aldri i livet"	Norwegian	Finn Kalvik	20 ◁
417	14	United Kingdom	24	Bucks Fizz	"Making Your Mind Up"	English	John Danter; Andy Hill	1
418	15	Portugal	17	Carlos Paião	"Playback"	Portuguese	Carlos Paião	18
419	16	Belgium	26	Emly Starr	"Samson"	Dutch	Kick Dandy; Penny Els; Giuseppe Marchese	13
420	17	Greece	7	Yiannis Dimitras	"Feggari kalokerino" (Φεγγάρι καλοκαιρινό)	Greek	Yiannis Dimitras; Giorgos Niarchos	8
421	18	Cyprus	1	Island	"Monika" (Μόνικα)	Greek	Doros Georgiades; Stavros Sideras	6
422	19	Switzerland	26	Peter, Sue and Marc	"Io senza te"	Italian	Nella Martinetti; Peter Reber	4
423	20	Sweden	21	Björn Skifs	"Fångad i en dröm"	Swedish	Bengt Palmers; Björn Skifs	10

Eurovision Song Contest 1982
#	R/O	Country	#	Artist	Song	Language	Songwriter(s)	Placing
424	1	Portugal	18	Doce	"Bem bom"	Portuguese	Pedro Brito; Tozé Brito; António Avelar de Pinho	13
425	2	Luxembourg	26	Svetlana	"Cours après le temps"	French	Cyril Assous; Michel Jouveaux	6
426	3	Norway	22	Jahn Teigen and Anita Skorgan	"Adieu"	Norwegian	Herodes Falsk; Jahn Teigen	12
427	4	United Kingdom	25	Bardo	"One Step Further"	English	Simon Jefferis	7
428	5	Turkey	5	Neco	"Hani?"	Turkish	Faik Tuğsuz; Olcayto Ahmet Tuğsuz	15
429	6	Finland	21	Kojo	"Nuku pommiin"	Finnish	Juice Leskinen; Jim Pembroke	18 ◁
430	7	Switzerland	27	Arlette Zola	"Amour on t'aime"	French	Pierre Alain; Alain Morisod	3
431	8	Cyprus	2	Anna Vissi	"Mono i agapi" (Μόνο η αγάπη)	Greek	Anna Vissi	5
432	9	Sweden	22	Chips	"Dag efter dag"	Swedish	Monica Forsberg; Lasse Holm	8
433	10	Austria	21	Mess	"Sonntag"	German	Rudolf Leve; Michael Scheickl	9
434	11	Belgium	27	Stella	"Si tu aimes ma musique"	French	Fred Bekky; Bobott; Rony Brack; Jo May	4
435	12	Spain	22	Lucía	"Él"	Spanish	Paco Cepero; Ignacio Román	10
436	13	Denmark	15	Brixx	"Video-Video"	Danish	Jens Brixtofte	17
437	14	Yugoslavia	18	Aska	"Halo, halo" (Хало, хало)	Serbo-Croatian	Aleksandar "Sanja" Ilić; Miro Zec	14
438	15	Israel	9	Avi Toledano	"Hora" (הורה)	Hebrew	Yoram Taharlev; Avi Toledano	2
439	16	Netherlands	27	Bill van Dijk	"Jij en ik"	Dutch	Dick Bakker; Liselore Gerritsen	16
440	17	Ireland	18	The Duskeys	"Here Today, Gone Tomorrow"	English	Sally Keating	11
441	18	Germany	27	Nicole	"Ein bißchen Frieden"	German	Bernd Meinunger; Ralph Siegel	1

Eurovision Song Contest 1983
#	R/O	Country	#	Artist	Song	Language	Songwriter(s)	Placing
442	1	France	26	Guy Bonnet	"Vivre"	French	Guy Bonnet; Fulbert Cant	8
443	2	Norway	23	Jahn Teigen	"Do Re Mi"	Norwegian	Herodes Falsk; Anita Skorgan; Jahn Teigen	9
444	3	United Kingdom	26	Sweet Dreams	"I'm Never Giving Up"	English	Jan Pulsford; Ron Roker; Phil Wigger	6
445	4	Sweden	23	Carola Häggkvist	"Främling"	Swedish	Monica Forsberg; Lasse Holm	3
446	5	Italy	26	Riccardo Fogli	"Per Lucia"	Italian	Maurizio Fabrizio; Riccardo Fogli; Vincenzo Spampinato	11
447	6	Turkey	6	Çetin Alp and the Short Wave	"Opera"	Turkish	Aysel Gürel; Buğra Uğur	19 ◁
448	7	Spain	23	Remedios Amaya	"Quién maneja mi barca"	Spanish	José Miguel Évoras; Isidro Muñoz	19 ◁
449	8	Switzerland	28	Mariella Farré	"Io così non ci sto"	Italian	Thomas Gonzenbach; Remo Kessler; Nella Martinetti	15
450	9	Finland	22	Ami Aspelund	"Fantasiaa"	Finnish	Kaisu Liuhala; Kari Kuusamo	11
451	10	Greece	8	Christie	"Mou les" (Μου λες)	Greek	Sophia Fildissi; Antonis Plessas	14
452	11	Netherlands	28	Bernadette	"Sing Me a Song"	Dutch	Martin Duiser; Piet Souer	7
453	12	Yugoslavia	19	Daniel	"Džuli" (Џули)	Serbo-Croatian	Mario Mihaljević; Danijel Popović	4
454	13	Cyprus	3	Stavros and Constantina	"I agapi akoma zi" (Η αγάπη ακόμα ζει)	Greek	Stavros Sideras	16
455	14	Germany	28	Hoffmann and Hoffmann	"Rücksicht"	German	Volker Lechtenbrink; Michael Reinecke	5
456	15	Denmark	16	Gry Johansen	"Kloden drejer"	Danish	Lars Christensen; Flemming Gernyx; Christian Jacobsen	17
457	16	Israel	10	Ofra Haza	"Hi" (חי)	Hebrew	Ehud Manor; Avi Toledano	2
458	17	Portugal	19	Armando Gama	"Esta balada que te dou"	Portuguese	Armando Gama	13
459	18	Austria	22	Westend	"Hurricane"	German	Heli Deinboek; Heinz Nessizius; Peter Vieweger	9
460	19	Belgium	28	Pas de Deux	"Rendez-vous"	Dutch	Paul Peyskens; Walter Verdin	18
461	20	Luxembourg	27	Corinne Hermès	"Si la vie est cadeau"	French	Alain Garcia; Jean-Pierre Millers	1

Eurovision Song Contest 1984
#	R/O	Country	#	Artist	Song	Language	Songwriter(s)	Placing
462	1	Sweden	24	Herreys	"Diggi-Loo Diggi-Ley"	Swedish	Britt Lindeborg; Torgny Söderberg	1
463	2	Luxembourg	28	Sophie Carle	"100% d'amour"	French	Jean-Michel Bériat; Jean-Pierre Goussaud; Patrick Jaymes	10
464	3	France	27	Annick Thoumazeau	"Autant d'amoureux que d'étoiles"	French	Vladimir Cosma; Charles Level	8
465	4	Spain	24	Bravo	"Lady, Lady"	Spanish	Miguel Blasco; Amaia Saizar	3
466	5	Norway	24	Dollie de Luxe	"Lenge leve livet"	Norwegian	Benedicte Adrian; Ingrid Bjørnov	17
467	6	United Kingdom	27	Belle and the Devotions	"Love Games"	English	Paul Curtis; Graham Sacher	7
468	7	Cyprus	4	Andy Paul	"Anna Mari-Elena" (Άννα Μαρί-Έλενα)	Greek	Andy Paul	15
469	8	Belgium	29	Jacques Zegers	"Avanti la vie"	French	Henri Seroka; Jacques Zegers	5
470	9	Ireland	19	Linda Martin	"Terminal 3"	English	Johnny Logan	2
471	10	Denmark	17	Hot Eyes	"Det' lige det"	Danish	Søren Bundgaard; Keld Heick	4
472	11	Netherlands	29	Maribelle	"Ik hou van jou"	Dutch	Peter van Asten; Richard de Bois	13
473	12	Yugoslavia	20	Ida and Vlado	"Ciao, amore"	Serbo-Croatian	Slobodan Bučevac; Milan Perić	18
474	13	Austria	23	Anita	"Einfach weg"	German	Walter Müller; Brigitte Seuberth	19 ◁
475	14	Germany	29	Mary Roos	"Aufrecht geh'n"	German	Michael Kunze; Michael Reinecke	13
476	15	Turkey	7	Beş Yıl Önce, On Yıl Sonra	"Halay"	Turkish	Ülkü Aker; Selçuk Başar	12
477	16	Finland	23	Kirka	"Hengaillaan"	Finnish	Jukka Siikavire; Jussi Tuominen	9
478	17	Switzerland	29	Rainy Day	"Welche Farbe hat der Sonnenschein"	German	Günter Loose	16
479	18	Italy	27	Alice and Franco Battiato	"I treni di Tozeur"	Italian	Franco Battiato; Rosario Consentino; Giusto Pio	5
480	19	Portugal	20	Maria Guinot	"Silêncio e tanta gente"	Portuguese	Maria Guinot	11

Eurovision Song Contest 1985
#	R/O	Country	#	Artist	Song	Language	Songwriter(s)	Placing
481	1	Ireland	20	Maria Christian	"Wait Until the Weekend Comes"	English	Brendan Graham	6
482	2	Finland	24	Sonja Lumme	"Eläköön elämä"	Finnish	Petri Laaksonen; Veli-Pekka Lehto	9
483	3	Cyprus	5	Lia Vissi	"To katalava arga" (Το κατάλαβα αργά)	Greek	Lia Vissi	16
484	4	Denmark	18	Hot Eyes	"Sku' du spørg' fra no'en"	Danish	Søren Bundgaard; Keld Heick	11
485	5	Spain	25	Paloma San Basilio	"La fiesta terminó"	Spanish	Juan Carlos Calderón	14
486	6	France	28	Roger Bens	"Femme dans ses rêves aussi"	French	Didier Pascalis	10
487	7	Turkey	8	MFÖ	"Didai didai dai"	Turkish	Mazhar Alanson; Fuat Güner; Özkan Uğur	14
488	8	Belgium	30	Linda Lepomme	"Laat me nu gaan"	Dutch	Pieter Verlinden; Bert Vivier	19 ◁
489	9	Portugal	21	Adelaide	"Penso em ti, eu sei"	Portuguese	Tozé Brito; Luís Fernando; Adelaide Ferreira	18
490	10	Germany	30	Wind	"Für alle"	German	Hanne Haller	2
491	11	Israel	11	Izhar Cohen	"Olé, Olé" (עולה, עולה)	Hebrew	Hamutal Ben-Ze'ev; Kobi Oshrat	5
492	12	Italy	28	Al Bano and Romina Power	"Magic, Oh Magic"	Italian	Dario Farina; Michael Hoffmann; Christiano Minellono	7
493	13	Norway	25	Bobbysocks!	"La det swinge"	Norwegian	Rolf Løvland	1
494	14	United Kingdom	28	Vikki	"Love Is"	English	James Kaleth; Vikki Watson	4
495	15	Switzerland	30	Mariella Farré and Pino Gasparini	"Piano, piano"	German	Anita Kerr; Trudi Müller-Bosshard	12
496	16	Sweden	25	Kikki Danielsson	"Bra vibrationer"	Swedish	Ingela Forsman; Lasse Holm	3
497	17	Austria	24	Gary Lux	"Kinder dieser Welt"	German	Geoff Bastow; Mick Jackson; Michael Kunze	8
498	18	Luxembourg	29	Margo, Franck Olivier, Chris Roberts, Malcolm Roberts, Ireen Sheer and Diane Solomon	"Children, Kinder, Enfants"	French	Jean-Michel Bériat; Bernd Meinunger; Ralph Siegel	13
499	19	Greece	9	Takis Biniaris	"Miazoume" (Μοιάζουμε)	Greek	Takis Biniaris; Maro Bizani	16

Eurovision Song Contest 1986
#	R/O	Country	#	Artist	Song	Language	Songwriter(s)	Placing
500	1	Luxembourg	30	Sherisse Laurence	"L'Amour de ma vie"	French	Frank Dostal; Alain Garcia; Rolf Soja	3
501	2	Yugoslavia	21	Doris	"Željo moja" (Жељо моја)	Serbo-Croatian	Zrinko Tutić	11
502	3	France	29	Cocktail Chic	"Européennes"	French	Georges Costa; Michel Costa	17
503	4	Norway	26	Ketil Stokkan	"Romeo"	Norwegian	Ketil Stokkan	12
504	5	United Kingdom	29	Ryder	"Runner in the Night"	English	Maureen Darbyshire; Brian Wade	7
505	6	Iceland	1	ICY	"Gleðibankinn"	Icelandic	Magnús Eiríksson	16
506	7	Netherlands	30	Frizzle Sizzle	"Alles heeft ritme"	Dutch	Rob ten Bokum; Peter Schön	13
507	8	Turkey	9	Klips ve Onlar	"Halley"	Turkish	İlhan İrem; Melih Kibar	9
508	9	Spain	26	Cadillac	"Valentino"	Spanish	José María Guzmán	10
509	10	Switzerland	31	Daniela Simons	"Pas pour moi"	French	Nella Martinetti; Atilla Şereftuğ	2
510	11	Israel	12	Moti Giladi and Sarai Tzuriel	"Yavo Yom" (יבוא יום)	Hebrew	Moti Giladi; Yoram Zadok	19
511	12	Ireland	21	Luv Bug	"You Can Count On Me"	English	Kevin Sheerin	4
512	13	Belgium	31	Sandra Kim	"J'aime la vie"	French	Angelo Crisci; Jean-Pierre Furnémont; Rosario Marino	1
513	14	Germany	31	Ingrid Peters	"Über die Brücke geh'n"	German	Hans Blum	8
514	15	Cyprus	6	Elpida	"Tora zo" (Τώρα ζω)	Greek	Phivos Gavris; Peter Yiannaki	20 ◁
515	16	Austria	25	Timna Brauer	"Die Zeit ist einsam"	German	Peter Cornelius; Peter Janda	18
516	17	Sweden	26	Lasse Holm and Monica Törnell	"E' de' det här du kallar kärlek"	Swedish	Lasse Holm	5
517	18	Denmark	19	Lise Haavik	"Du er fuld af løgn"	Danish	John Hatting	6
518	19	Finland	25	Kari	"Never the End"	Finnish	Kari Kuivalainen	15
519	20	Portugal	22	Dora	"Não sejas mau p'ra mim"	Portuguese	Guilherme Inês; Luís Oliveira; Zé da Ponte	14

Eurovision Song Contest 1987
#	R/O	Country	#	Artist	Song	Language	Songwriter(s)	Placing
520	1	Norway	27	Kate Gulbrandsen	"Mitt liv"	Norwegian	Hanne Krogh; Rolf Løvland	9
521	2	Israel	13	Datner and Kushnir	"Shir Habatlanim" (שיר הבטלנים)	Hebrew	Zohar Laskov	8
522	3	Austria	26	Gary Lux	"Nur noch Gefühl"	German	Stefanie Werger; Kenneth Westmore	20
523	4	Iceland	2	Halla Margrét	"Hægt og hljótt"	Icelandic	Valgeir Guðjónsson	16
524	5	Belgium	32	Liliane Saint-Pierre	"Soldiers of Love"	Dutch	Marc De Coen; Liliane Keuninckx; Gyuri Spies	11
525	6	Sweden	27	Lotta Engberg	"Boogaloo"	Swedish	Christer Lundh; Mikael Wendt	12
526	7	Italy	29	Umberto Tozzi and Raf	"Gente di mare"	Italian	Giancarlo Bigazzi; Raf Riefoli; Umberto Tozzi	3
527	8	Portugal	23	Nevada	"Neste barco à vela"	Portuguese	Alfredo Azinheira; Jorge Mendes	18
528	9	Spain	27	Patricia Kraus	"No estás solo"	Spanish	Patricia Kraus; Rafael Martínez; Rafael Trabucchelli	19
529	10	Turkey	10	Seyyal Taner and Grup Lokomotif	"Şarkım Sevgi Üstüne"	Turkish	Olcayto Ahmet Tuğsuz	22 ◁
530	11	Greece	10	Bang	"Stop" (Στοπ)	Greek	Vassilis Dertilis; Thanos Kalliris	10
531	12	Netherlands	31	Marcha	"Rechtop in de wind"	Dutch	Peter Koelewijn	5
532	13	Luxembourg	31	Plastic Bertrand	"Amour amour"	French	Roger Jouret; Alec Mansion	21
533	14	United Kingdom	30	Rikki	"Only the Light"	English	Richard Peebles	13
534	15	France	30	Christine Minier	"Les mots d'amour n'ont pas de dimanche"	French	Gérard Curci; Marc Minier	14
535	16	Germany	32	Wind	"Laß die Sonne in dein Herz"	German	Bernd Meinunger; Ralph Siegel	2
536	17	Cyprus	7	Alexia	"Aspro mavro" (Άσπρο μαύρο)	Greek	Andros Papapavlou; Maria Papapavlou	7
537	18	Finland	26	Vicky Rosti	"Sata salamaa"	Finnish	Petri Laaksonen; Veli-Pekka Lehto	15
538	19	Denmark	20	Bandjo with Anne-Cathrine Herdorf	"En lille melodi"	Danish	Helge Engelbrecht; Jacob Jonia	5
539	20	Ireland	22	Johnny Logan	"Hold Me Now"	English	Seán Sherrard	1
540	21	Yugoslavia	22	Novi fosili	"Ja sam za ples" (Ја сам за плес)	Serbo-Croatian	Stevo Cvikić; Rajko Dujmić	4
541	22	Switzerland	32	Carol Rich	"Moitié moitié"	French	Jean-Jacques Egli	17

Eurovision Song Contest 1988
#	R/O	Country	#	Artist	Song	Language	Songwriter(s)	Placing
542	1	Iceland	3	Beathoven	"Sókrates"	Icelandic	Sverrir Stormsker	16
543	2	Sweden	28	Tommy Körberg	"Stad i ljus"	Swedish	Py Bäckman	12
544	3	Finland	27	Boulevard	"Nauravat silmät muistetaan"	Finnish	Kirsti Willberg; Pepe Willberg	20
545	4	United Kingdom	31	Scott Fitzgerald	"Go"	English	Julie Forsyth	2
546	5	Turkey	11	MFÖ	"Sufi (Hey Ya Hey)"	Turkish	Mazhar Alanson; Fuat Güner; Özkan Uğur	15
547	6	Spain	28	La Década	"La chica que yo quiero (Made in Spain)"	Spanish	Francisco Dondiego; Enrique Peiró	11
548	7	Netherlands	32	Gerard Joling	"Shangri-La"	Dutch	Peter de Wijn	9
549	8	Israel	14	Yardena Arazi	"Ben Adam" (בן אדם)	Hebrew	Boris Dimitshtein; Ehud Manor	7
550	9	Switzerland	33	Céline Dion	"Ne partez pas sans moi"	French	Nella Martinetti; Atilla Şereftuğ	1
551	10	Ireland	23	Jump the Gun	"Take Him Home"	English	Peter Eades	8
552	11	Germany	33	Maxi and Chris Garden	"Lied für einen Freund"	German	Bernd Meinunger; Ralph Siegel	14
553	12	Austria	27	Wilfried	"Lisa Mona Lisa"	German	Ronnie Herbholzheimer; Klaus Kofler; Wilfried Scheutz	21 ◁
554	13	Denmark	21	Hot Eyes	"Ka' du se hva' jeg sa'"	Danish	Søren Bundgaard; Keld Heick	3
555	14	Greece	11	Afroditi Fryda	"Clown" (Κλόουν)	Greek	Dimitris Sakislis	17
556	15	Norway	28	Karoline Krüger	"For vår jord"	Norwegian	Erik Hillestad; Anita Skorgan	5
557	16	Belgium	33	Reynaert	"Laissez briller le soleil"	French	Philippe Anciaux; Joseph Reynaerts; Dany Willem	18
558	17	Luxembourg	32	Lara Fabian	"Croire"	French	Jacques Cardona; Alain Garcia	4
559	18	Italy	30	Luca Barbarossa	"Ti scrivo"	Italian	Luca Barbarossa	12
560	19	France	31	Gérard Lenorman	"Chanteur de charme"	French	Claude Lemesle; Gérard Lenorman	10
561	20	Portugal	24	Dora	"Voltarei"	Portuguese	José Calvário; José Niza	18
562	21	Yugoslavia	23	Srebrna krila	"Mangup" (Мангуп)	Serbo-Croatian	Stevo Cvikić; Rajko Dujmić	6

Eurovision Song Contest 1989
#	R/O	Country	#	Artist	Song	Language	Songwriter(s)	Placing
563	1	Italy	31	Anna Oxa and Fausto Leali	"Avrei voluto"	Italian	Franco Berlincioni; Franco Ciani; Franco Fasano	9
564	2	Israel	15	Gili and Galit	"Derekh Hamelekh" (דרך המלך)	Hebrew	Shaike Paikov	12
565	3	Ireland	24	Kiev Connolly and the Missing Passengers	"The Real Me"	English	Kiev Connolly	18
566	4	Netherlands	33	Justine Pelmelay	"Blijf zoals je bent"	Dutch	Cees Bergman; Geertjan Hessing; Jan Kisjes; Aart Mol; Erwin van Prehm; Elmer Veerfoff	15
567	5	Turkey	12	Pan	"Bana Bana"	Turkish	Timur Selçuk	21
568	6	Belgium	34	Ingeborg	"Door de wind"	Dutch	Stef Bos	19
569	7	United Kingdom	32	Live Report	"Why Do I Always Get It Wrong"	English	John Beeby; Brian Hodgson	2
570	8	Norway	29	Britt Synnøve Johansen	"Venners nærhet"	Norwegian	Inge Enoksen; Leiv N. Grøtte	17
571	9	Portugal	25	Da Vinci	"Conquistador"	Portuguese	Pedro Luís; Ricardo	16
572	10	Sweden	29	Tommy Nilsson	"En dag"	Swedish	Alexander Bard; Ola Håkansson; Tim Norell	4
573	11	Luxembourg	33	Park Café	"Monsieur"	French	Yves Lacomblez; Bernard Loncheval; Maggie Parke; Gast Waltzing	20
574	12	Denmark	22	Birthe Kjær	"Vi maler byen rød"	Danish	Søren Bundgaard; Keld Heick	3
575	13	Austria	28	Thomas Forstner	"Nur ein Lied"	German	Dieter Bohlen; Joachim Horn-Bernges	5
576	14	Finland	28	Anneli Saaristo	"La dolce vita"	Finnish	Matti Puurtinen; Turkka Mali	7
577	15	France	32	Nathalie Pâque	"J'ai volé la vie"	French	G.G. Candy; Sylvain Lebel; Guy Mattéoni	8
578	16	Spain	29	Nina	"Nacida para amar"	Spanish	Juan Carlos Calderón	6
579	17	Cyprus	8	Fanny Polymeri and Yiannis Savvidakis	"Apopse as vrethoume" (Απόψε ας βρεθούμε)	Greek	Efi Meletiou; Marios Meletiou	11
580	18	Switzerland	34	Furbaz	"Viver senza tei"	Romansh	Marie Louise Werth	13
581	19	Greece	12	Marianna	"To diko sou asteri" (Το δικό σου αστέρι)	Greek	Marianna Efstratiou; Yiannis Kyris; Villy Sanianou	9
582	20	Iceland	4	Daníel	"Það sem enginn sér"	Icelandic	Valgeir Guðjónsson	22 ◁
583	21	Germany	34	Nino de Angelo	"Flieger"	German	Dieter Bohlen; Joachim Horn-Bernges	14
584	22	Yugoslavia	24	Riva	"Rock Me"	Serbo-Croatian	Stevo Cvikić; Rajko Dujmić	1

=== 1990s ===
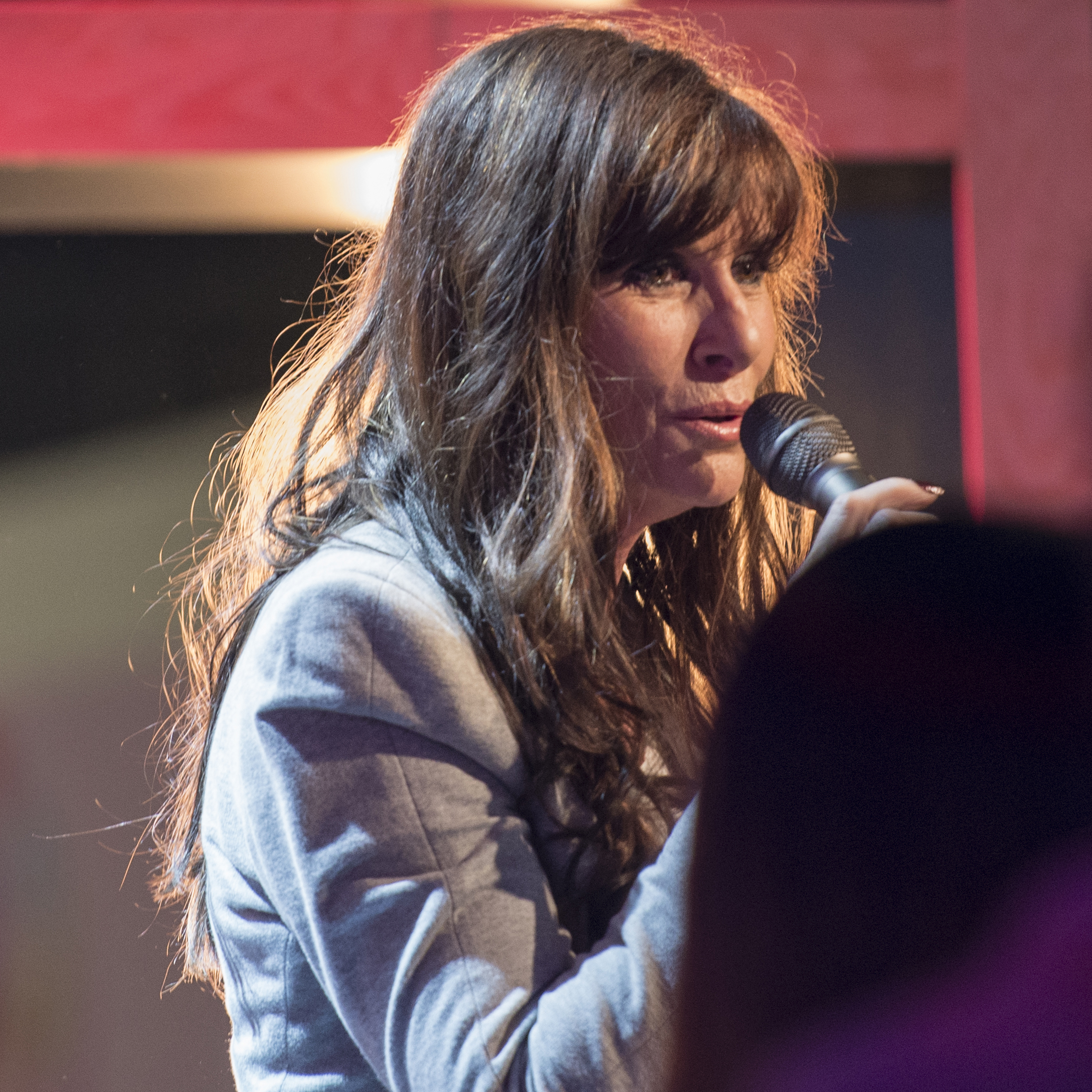
Linda Martin performed the first of three consecutive Eurovision winners for Ireland in the 1990s.

Edyta Górniak performed Poland's first Eurovision entry in 1994.

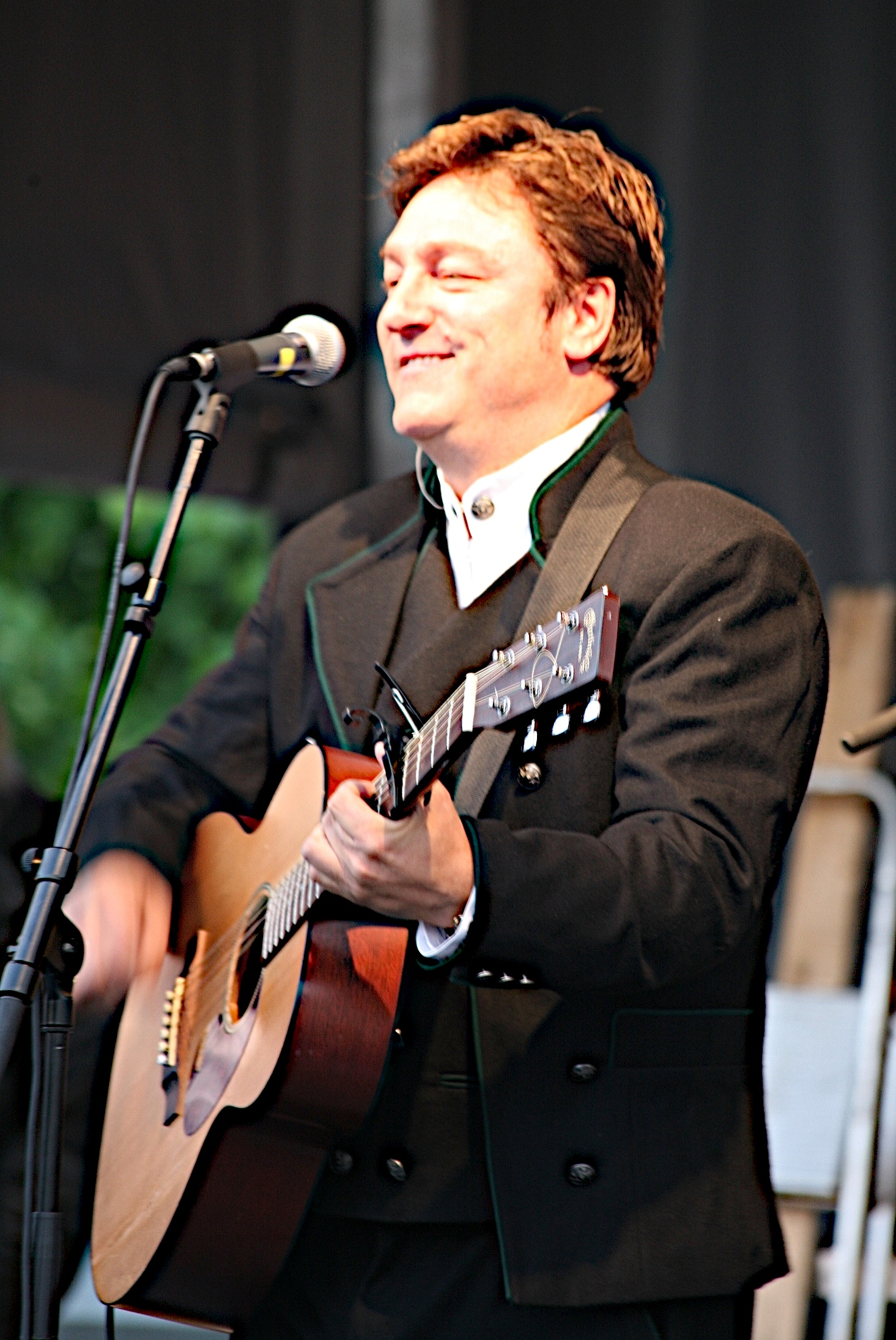
Tor Endresen received nul points for his entry in 1997, the fourth Norwegian act to achieve this feat.

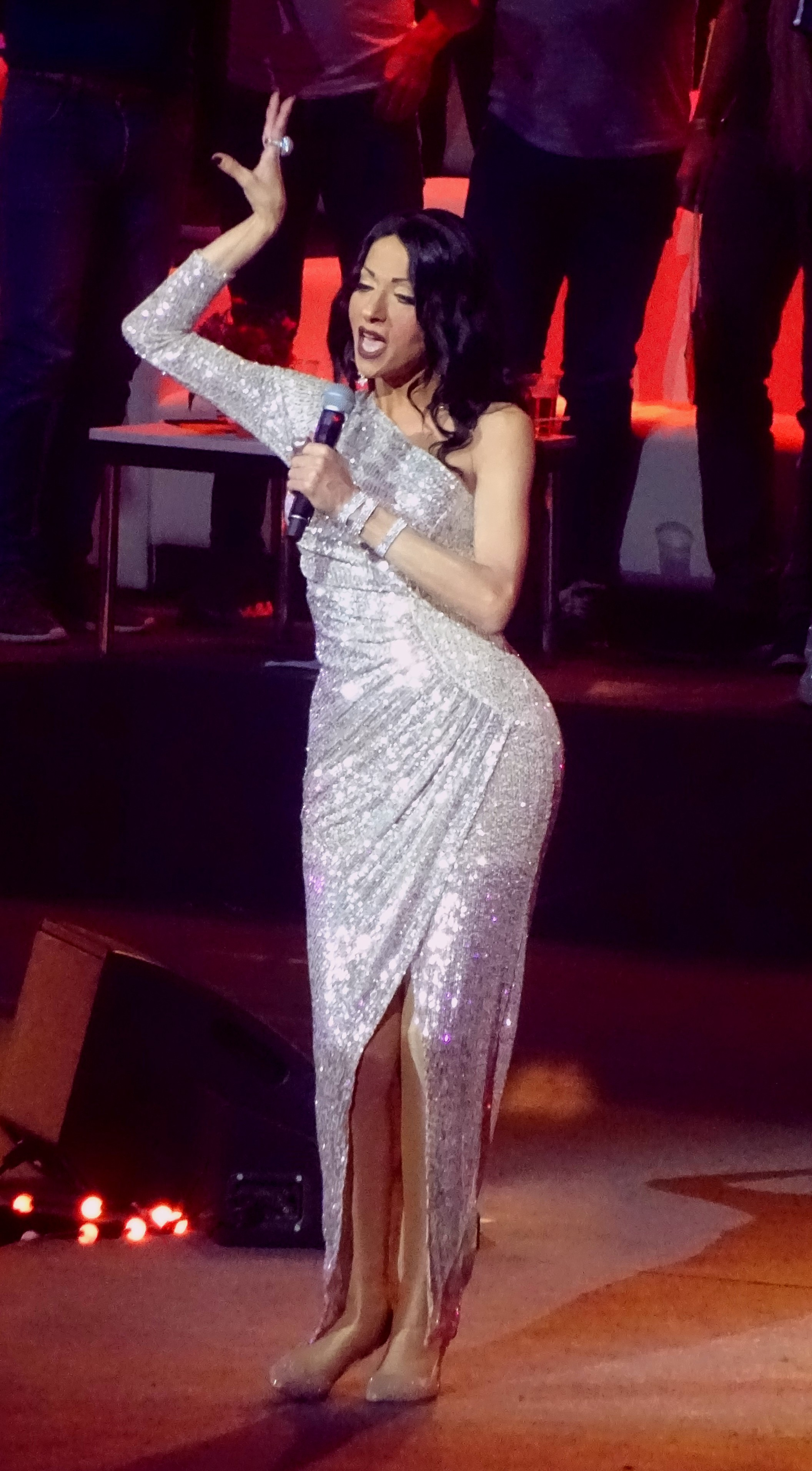
Dana International earned Israel's third Eurovision victory in 1998, and became the contest's first transgender winner.

Eurovision Song Contest 1990
#	R/O	Country	#	Artist	Song	Language	Songwriter(s)	Placing
585	1	Spain	30	Azúcar Moreno	"Bandido"	Spanish	José Luis Abel; Raúl Orellana; Jaime Stinus	5
586	2	Greece	13	Christos Callow	"Horis skopo" (Χωρίς σκοπό)	Greek	Giorgos Palaiokastriris; Giorgos Papagiannakis	19
587	3	Belgium	35	Philippe Lafontaine	"Macédomienne"	French	Philippe Lafontaine	12
588	4	Turkey	13	Kayahan	"Gözlerinin Hapsindeyim"	Turkish	Kayahan Açar	17
589	5	Netherlands	34	Maywood	"Ik wil alles met je delen"	Dutch	Alice May	15
590	6	Luxembourg	34	Céline Carzo	"Quand je te rêve"	French	Thierry Delianis; Jean-Charles France	13
591	7	United Kingdom	33	Emma	"Give a Little Love Back to the World"	English	Paul Curtis	6
592	8	Iceland	5	Stjórnin	"Eitt lag enn"	Icelandic	Aðalsteinn Ásberg Sigurðsson; Hörður G. Ólafsson	4
593	9	Norway	30	Ketil Stokkan	"Brandenburger Tor"	Norwegian	Ketil Stokkan	21 ◁
594	10	Israel	16	Rita	"Shara Barkhovot" (שרה ברחובות)	Hebrew	Rami Kleinstein; Tzruya Lahav	18
595	11	Denmark	23	Lonnie Devantier	"Hallo Hallo"	Danish	John Hatting; Keld Heick; Torben Lendager	8
596	12	Switzerland	35	Egon Egemann	"Musik klingt in die Welt hinaus"	German	Cornelia Lackner	11
597	13	Germany	35	Chris Kempers and Daniel Kovac	"Frei zu leben"	German	Michael Kunze; Ralph Siegel	9
598	14	France	33	Joëlle Ursull	"White and Black Blues"	French	Georges Augier de Moussac; Serge Gainsbourg	2
599	15	Yugoslavia	25	Tajči	"Hajde da ludujemo" (Хајде да лудујемо)	Serbo-Croatian	Zrinko Tutić; Alka Vuica	7
600	16	Portugal	26	Nucha	"Há sempre alguém"	Portuguese	Luís Filipe; Francisco Teotónio Pereira; Frederico Teotónio Pereira; Jan van Dijck	20
601	17	Ireland	25	Liam Reilly	"Somewhere in Europe"	English	Liam Reilly	2
602	18	Sweden	30	Edin-Ådahl	"Som en vind"	Swedish	Mikael Wendt	16
603	19	Italy	32	Toto Cutugno	"Insieme: 1992"	Italian	Toto Cutugno	1
604	20	Austria	29	Simone	"Keine Mauern mehr"	German	Mario Botazzi; Nanna Berry; Wolfgang Berry	10
605	21	Cyprus	9	Anastasiou	"Milas poli" (Μιλάς πολύ)	Greek	Haris Anastasiou; John Vickers	14
606	22	Finland	29	Beat	"Fri?"	Swedish	Janne Engblom; Kim Engblom; Stina Engblom; Tina Krause	21 ◁

Eurovision Song Contest 1991
#	R/O	Country	#	Artist	Song	Language	Songwriter(s)	Placing
607	1	Yugoslavia	26	Baby Doll	"Brazil" (Бразил)	Serbo-Croatian	Dragana Šarić; Zoran Vračević	21
608	2	Iceland	6	Stefán and Eyfi	"Nína"	Icelandic	Eyjólfur Kristjánsson	15
609	3	Malta	4	Paul Giordimaina and Georgina	"Could It Be"	English	Paul Abela; Raymond Mahoney	6
610	4	Greece	14	Sophia Vossou	"Anixi" (Άνοιξη)	Greek	Andreas Mikroutsikos	13
611	5	Switzerland	36	Sandra Simó	"Canzone per te"	Italian	Renato Mascetti	5
612	6	Austria	30	Thomas Forstner	"Venedig im Regen"	German	Wolfgang Eltner; Hubert Moser; Robby Musenbichler	22 ◁
613	7	Luxembourg	35	Sarah Bray	"Un baiser volé"	French	Patrick Hippert; Linda Lecomte; Mick Wersant	14
614	8	Sweden	31	Carola	"Fångad av en stormvind"	Swedish	Stephan Berg	1
615	9	France	34	Amina	"C'est le dernier qui a parlé qui a raison"	French	Amina Annabi; Wasis Diop	2
616	10	Turkey	14	Can Uğurluer, İzel Çeliköz, Reyhan Karaca	"İki Dakika"	Turkish	Aysel Gürel; Şevket Uğurluer	12
617	11	Ireland	26	Kim Jackson	"Could It Be That I'm in Love"	English	Liam Reilly	10
618	12	Portugal	27	Dulce	"Lusitana paixão"	Portuguese	Fred Micaelo; Zé da Ponte; Jorge Quintela	8
619	13	Denmark	24	Anders Frandsen	"Lige der hvor hjertet slår"	Danish	Michael Elo	19
620	14	Norway	31	Just 4 Fun	"Mrs. Thompson"	Norwegian	Dag Kolsrud; P.G. Roness; Kaare Skevik	17
621	15	Israel	17	Duo Datz	"Kan" (כאן)	Hebrew	Uzi Hitman	3
622	16	Finland	30	Kaija	"Hullu yö"	Finnish	Ile Kallio; Jukka Välimaa	20
623	17	Germany	36	Atlantis 2000	"Dieser Traum darf niemals sterben"	German	Helmut Frey; Alfons Weindorf	18
624	18	Belgium	36	Clouseau	"Geef het op"	Dutch	Jan Leyers; Bob Savenberg; Koen Wauters; Kris Wauters	16
625	19	Spain	31	Sergio Dalma	"Bailar pegados"	Spanish	Luis Gómez-Escolar; Julio Seijas	4
626	20	United Kingdom	34	Samantha Janus	"A Message to Your Heart"	English	Paul Curtis	10
627	21	Cyprus	10	Elena Patroklou	"S.O.S."	Greek	Kypros Charalambous; Andreas Christou	9
628	22	Italy	33	Peppino di Capri	"Comme è ddoce 'o mare"	Neapolitan	Giampiero Artegiani; Marcello Marocchi	7

Eurovision Song Contest 1992
#	R/O	Country	#	Artist	Song	Language	Songwriter(s)	Placing
629	1	Spain	32	Serafín	"Todo esto es la música"	Spanish	Luis Miguélez; Alfredo Valbuena	14
630	2	Belgium	37	Morgane	"Nous on veut des violons"	French	Claude Barzotti; Anne-Marie Gaspard	20
631	3	Israel	18	Dafna	"Ze Rak Sport" (זה רק ספורט)	Hebrew	Ehud Manor; Kobi Oshrat	6
632	4	Turkey	15	Aylin Vatankoş	"Yaz Bitti"	Turkish	Aldoğan Şimşekyay; Aylin Uçanlar	19
633	5	Greece	15	Cleopatra	"Olou tou kosmou i elpida" (Όλου του κόσμου η ελπίδα)	Greek	Christos Lagos	5
634	6	France	35	Kali	"Monté la riviè"	French, Antillean Creole	Rémy Bellenchombre; Kali	8
635	7	Sweden	32	Christer Björkman	"I morgon är en annan dag"	Swedish	Niklas Strömstedt	22
636	8	Portugal	28	Dina	"Amor d'água fresca"	Portuguese	Dina; Rosa Lobato de Faria	17
637	9	Cyprus	11	Evridiki	"Teriazoume" (Ταιριάζουμε)	Greek	George Theofanous	11
638	10	Malta	5	Mary Spiteri	"Little Child"	English	Georgina Abela; Raymond Mahoney	3
639	11	Iceland	7	Heart 2 Heart	"Nei eða já"	Icelandic	Friðrik Karlsson; Grétar Örvarsson; Stefán Hilmarsson	7
640	12	Finland	31	Pave	"Yamma Yamma"	Finnish	Hector; Pave	23 ◁
641	13	Switzerland	37	Daisy Auvray	"Mister Music Man"	French	Gordon Dent	15
642	14	Luxembourg	36	Marion Welter and Kontinent	"Sou fräi"	Luxembourgish	Ab van Goor; Jang Linster	21
643	15	Austria	31	Tony Wegas	"Zusammen geh'n"	German	Dieter Bohlen; Joachim Horn-Bernges	10
644	16	United Kingdom	35	Michael Ball	"One Step Out of Time"	English	Paul Davies; Tony Ryan; Victor Stratton	2
645	17	Ireland	27	Linda Martin	"Why Me"	English	Johnny Logan	1
646	18	Denmark	25	Lotte Nilsson and Kenny Lübcke	"Alt det som ingen ser"	Danish	Carsten Warming	12
647	19	Italy	34	Mia Martini	"Rapsodia"	Italian	Giancarlo Bigazzi; Giuseppe Dati	4
648	20	Yugoslavia	27	Extra Nena	"Ljubim te pesmama" (Љубим те песмама)	Serbian	Gale Janković; Radivoje Radivojević	13
649	21	Norway	32	Merethe Trøan	"Visjoner"	Norwegian	Eva Jansen; Robert Morley	18
650	22	Germany	37	Wind	"Träume sind für alle da"	German	Bernd Meinunger; Ralph Siegel	16
651	23	Netherlands	35	Humphrey Campbell	"Wijs me de weg"	Dutch	Edwin Schimscheimer	9

Eurovision Song Contest 1993
#	R/O	Country	#	Artist	Song	Language	Songwriter(s)	Placing
652	1	Italy	35	Enrico Ruggeri	"Sole d'Europa"	Italian	Enrico Ruggeri	12
653	2	Turkey	16	Burak Aydos, Öztürk Baybora and Serter	"Esmer Yarim"	Turkish	Burak Aydos	21
654	3	Germany	38	Münchener Freiheit	"Viel zu weit"	German	Stefan Zauner	18
655	4	Switzerland	38	Annie Cotton	"Moi, tout simplement"	French	Christophe Duc; Jean-Jacques Egli	3
656	5	Denmark	26	Seebach Band	"Under stjernerne på himlen"	Danish	Keld Heick; Tommy Seebach	22
657	6	Greece	16	Katerina Garbi	"Ellada, hora tou fotos" (Ελλάδα, χώρα του φωτός)	Greek	Dimosthenis Stringlis	9
658	7	Belgium	38	Barbara	"Iemand als jij"	Dutch	Tobana; Marc Vliegen	25 ◁
659	8	Malta	6	William Mangion	"This Time"	English	William Mangion	8
660	9	Iceland	8	Inga	"Þá veistu svarið"	Icelandic	Friðrik Sturluson; Jon Kjell Seljeseth	13
661	10	Austria	32	Tony Wegas	"Maria Magdalena"	German	Johann Bertl; Christian Kolonovits; Thomas Spitzer	14
662	11	Portugal	29	Anabela	"A cidade até ser dia"	Portuguese	Pedro Abrantes; Paulo da Costa; Marco Quelhas	10
663	12	France	36	Patrick Fiori	"Mama Corsica"	French, Corsican	François Valéry	4
664	13	Sweden	33	Arvingarna	"Eloise"	Swedish	Lasse Holm; Gert Lengstrand	7
665	14	Ireland	28	Niamh Kavanagh	"In Your Eyes"	English	Jimmy Walsh	1
666	15	Luxembourg	37	Modern Times	"Donne-moi une chance"	French, Luxembourgish	Patrick Hippert; Jimmy Martin	20
667	16	Slovenia	1	1X Band	"Tih deževen dan"	Slovene	Tomaž Kosec; Cole Moretti	22
668	17	Finland	32	Katri Helena	"Tule luo"	Finnish	Matti Puurtinen; Jukka Saarinen	17
669	18	Bosnia and Herzegovina	1	Fazla	"Sva bol svijeta"	Bosnian	Dino Dervišhalidović; Fahrudin Pecikoza	16
670	19	United Kingdom	36	Sonia	"Better the Devil You Know"	English	Dean Collinson; Red	2
671	20	Netherlands	36	Ruth Jacott	"Vrede"	Dutch	Jochem Fluitsma; Eric van Tijn; Henk Westbroek	6
672	21	Croatia	1	Put	"Don't Ever Cry"	Croatian, English	Andrej Baša; Đorđe Novković	15
673	22	Spain	33	Eva Santamaría	"Hombres"	Spanish	Carlos Toro	11
674	23	Cyprus	12	Zymboulakis and Van Beke	"Mi stamatas" (Μη σταματάς)	Greek	Aristos Moschovakis; Rodoula Papalambrianou	19
675	24	Israel	19	Lehakat Shiru	"Shiru" (שירו)	Hebrew, English	David Chris; Shaike Paikov; Yoram Taharlev	24
676	25	Norway	33	Silje Vige	"Alle mine tankar"	Norwegian	Bjørn Erik Vige	5

Eurovision Song Contest 1994
#	R/O	Country	#	Artist	Song	Language	Songwriter(s)	Placing
677	1	Sweden	34	Marie Bergman and Roger Pontare	"Stjärnorna"	Swedish	Peter Bertilsson; Mikael Littwold	13
678	2	Finland	33	CatCat	"Bye Bye Baby"	Finnish	Markku "Make" Lentonen; Kari Salli	22
679	3	Ireland	29	Paul Harrington and Charlie McGettigan	"Rock 'n' Roll Kids"	English	Brendan Graham	1
680	4	Cyprus	13	Evridiki	"Ime anthropos ki ego" (Είμαι άνθρωπος κι εγώ)	Greek	George Theofanous	11
681	5	Iceland	9	Sigga	"Nætur"	Icelandic	Friðrik Karlsson; Stefán Hilmarsson	12
682	6	United Kingdom	37	Frances Ruffelle	"We Will Be Free (Lonely Symphony)"	English	George De Angelis; Mark Dean	10
683	7	Croatia	2	Tony Cetinski	"Nek' ti bude ljubav sva"	Croatian	Željen Klašterka; Željko Krznarić	16
684	8	Portugal	30	Sara	"Chamar a música"	Portuguese	Rosa Lobato de Faria; João Carlos Mota Oliveira	8
685	9	Switzerland	39	Duilio	"Sto pregando"	Italian	Giuseppe Scaramella	19
686	10	Estonia	1	Silvi Vrait	"Nagu merelaine"	Estonian	Ivar Must; Leelo Tungal	24
687	11	Romania	1	Dan Bittman	"Dincolo de nori"	Romanian	Dan Bittman; Antonio Furtuna	21
688	12	Malta	7	Moira Stafrace and Christopher Scicluna	"More than Love"	English	Christopher Scicluna; Moira Stafrace	5
689	13	Netherlands	37	Willeke Alberti	"Waar is de zon"	Dutch	Coot van Doesburgh; Edwin Schimscheimer	23
690	14	Germany	39	Mekado	"Wir geben 'ne Party"	German	Bernd Meinunger; Ralph Siegel	3
691	15	Slovakia	1	Martin Ďurinda and Tublatanka	"Nekonečná pieseň"	Slovak	Martin Ďurinda; Martin Sarvaš	19
692	16	Lithuania	1	Ovidijus Vyšniauskas	"Lopšinė mylimai"	Lithuanian	Ovidijus Vyšniauskas; Gintaras Zdebskis	25 ◁
693	17	Norway	34	Elisabeth Andreasson and Jan Werner Danielsen	"Duett"	Norwegian	Rolf Løvland; Hans Olav Mørk	6
694	18	Bosnia and Herzegovina	2	Alma and Dejan	"Ostani kraj mene"	Bosnian	Adi Mulahalilović; Edo Mulahalilović	15
695	19	Greece	17	Kostas Bigalis and the Sea Lovers	"To trehandiri (Diri Diri)" (Το τρεχαντήρι (Ντίρι Ντίρι))	Greek	Kostas Bigalis	14
696	20	Austria	33	Petra Frey	"Für den Frieden der Welt"	German	Brunner & Brunner; Alfons Weindorf	17
697	21	Spain	34	Alejandro Abad	"Ella no es ella"	Spanish	Alejandro Abad	18
698	22	Hungary	1	Friderika	"Kinek mondjam el vétkeimet?"	Hungarian	Szilveszter Jenei	4
699	23	Russia	1	Youddiph	"Vechny strannik" (Вечный странник)	Russian	Piligrim; Lev Zemlinski	9
700	24	Poland	1	Edyta Górniak	"To nie ja!"	Polish	Jacek Cygan; Stanisław Syrewicz	2
701	25	France	37	Nina Morato	"Je suis un vrai garçon"	French	Bruno Maman; Nina Morato	7

Eurovision Song Contest 1995
#	R/O	Country	#	Artist	Song	Language	Songwriter(s)	Placing
702	1	Poland	2	Justyna	"Sama"	Polish	Mateusz Pospieszalski; Wojciech Waglewski	18
703	2	Ireland	30	Eddie Friel	"Dreamin'"	English	Richard Abbott; Barry Woods	14
704	3	Germany	40	Stone and Stone	"Verliebt in Dich"	German	Cheyenne Stone	23 ◁
705	4	Bosnia and Herzegovina	3	Davor Popović	"Dvadeset prvi vijek"	Bosnian	Sinan Alimanović; Zlatan Fazlić	19
706	5	Norway	35	Secret Garden	"Nocturne"	Norwegian	Rolf Løvland; Petter Skavlan	1
707	6	Russia	2	Philipp Kirkorov	"Kolybelnaya dlya vulkana" (Колыбельная для вулкана)	Russian	Ilya Bershadsky; Ilya Reznik	17
708	7	Iceland	10	Bo Halldórsson	"Núna"	Icelandic	Björgvin Halldórsson; Jón Örn Marinósson; Ed Welch	15
709	8	Austria	34	Stella Jones	"Die Welt dreht sich verkehrt"	German	Mischa Krausz	13
710	9	Spain	35	Anabel Conde	"Vuelve conmigo"	Spanish	José María Purón	2
711	10	Turkey	17	Arzu Ece	"Sev!"	Turkish	Melih Kibar; Zeynep Talu	16
712	11	Croatia	3	Magazin and Lidija	"Nostalgija"	Croatian	Tonči Huljić; Vjekoslava Huljić	6
713	12	France	38	Nathalie Santamaria	"Il me donne rendez-vous"	French	Didier Barbelivien; François Bernheim	4
714	13	Hungary	2	Csaba Szigeti	"Új név egy régi ház falán"	Hungarian	Ferenc Balázs; Attila Horváth	22
715	14	Belgium	39	Frédéric Etherlinck	"La voix est libre"	French	Pierre Theunis	20
716	15	United Kingdom	38	Love City Groove	"Love City Groove"	English	Yinka Charles; Paul Hardy; Tatsiana Mais; Stephen "Beanz" Rudden; Jay Williams	10
717	16	Portugal	31	Tó Cruz	"Baunilha e chocolate"	Portuguese	António Victorino de Almeida; Rosa Lobato de Faria	21
718	17	Cyprus	14	Alexandros Panayi	"Sti fotia" (Στη φωτιά)	Greek	Alexandros Panayi	9
719	18	Sweden	35	Jan Johansen	"Se på mej"	Swedish	Håkan Almqvist; Ingela "Pling" Forsman; Bobby Ljunggren	3
720	19	Denmark	27	Aud Wilken	"Fra Mols til Skagen"	Danish	Lise Cabble; Mette Mathiesen	5
721	20	Slovenia	2	Darja Švajger	"Prisluhni mi"	Slovene	Sašo Fajon; Primož Peterca	7
722	21	Israel	20	Liora	"Amen" (אמן)	Hebrew	Hamutal Ben-Ze'ev; Moshe Datz	8
723	22	Malta	8	Mike Spiteri	"Keep Me in Mind"	English	Ray Agius; Alfred Sant	10
724	23	Greece	18	Elina Konstantopoulou	"Pia prosefhi" (Ποια προσευχή)	Greek	Antonis Pappas; Nikos Terzis	12

Eurovision Song Contest 1996
#	R/O	Country	#	Artist	Song	Language	Songwriter(s)	Placing
725	1	Turkey	18	Şebnem Paker	"Beşinci Mevsim"	Turkish	Levent Çoker; Selma Çuhacı	12
726	2	United Kingdom	39	Gina G	"Ooh Aah... Just a Little Bit"	English	Steve Rodway; Simon Tauber	8
727	3	Spain	36	Antonio Carbonell	"Ay, qué deseo"	Spanish	Antonio Carmona; José Miguel Carmona; Juan Carmona	20
728	4	Portugal	32	Lúcia Moniz	"O meu coração não tem cor"	Portuguese	José Fanha; Pedro Osório	6
729	5	Cyprus	15	Constantinos	"Mono gia mas" (Μόνο για μας)	Greek	Andreas Giorgallis; Rodoula Papalambrianou	9
730	6	Malta	9	Miriam Christine	"In a Woman's Heart"	English	Paul Abela; Alfred Sant	10
731	7	Croatia	4	Maja Blagdan	"Sveta ljubav"	Croatian	Zrinko Tutić	4
732	8	Austria	35	George Nussbaumer	"Weil's dr guat got"	German (Note: Specifically Vorarlbergisch, a High Alemannic dialect)	Mischa Krausz; George Nussbaumer	10
733	9	Switzerland	40	Kathy Leander	"Mon cœur l'aime"	French	Régis Mounir	16
734	10	Greece	19	Marianna Efstratiou	"Emis forame to himona anixiatika" (Εμείς φοράμε το χειμώνα ανοιξιάτικα)	Greek	Kostas Bigalis; Iro Trigoni	14
735	11	Estonia	2	Maarja-Liis Ilus and Ivo Linna	"Kaelakee hääl"	Estonian	Priit Pajusaar; Kaari Sillamaa	5
736	12	Norway	36	Elisabeth Andreassen	"I evighet"	Norwegian	Torhild Nigar	2
737	13	France	39	Dan Ar Braz and l'Héritage des Celtes	"Diwanit bugale"	Breton	Dan Ar Braz	19
738	14	Slovenia	3	Regina	"Dan najlepših sanj"	Slovene	Aleksander Kogoj	21
739	15	Netherlands	38	Maxine and Franklin Brown	"De eerste keer"	Dutch	Peter van Asten; Piet Souer	7
740	16	Belgium	40	Lisa del Bo	"Liefde is een kaartspel"	Dutch	Siirak Brogden; Daniël Ditmar; John Terra	16
741	17	Ireland	31	Eimear Quinn	"The Voice"	English	Brendan Graham	1
742	18	Finland	34	Jasmine	"Niin kaunis on taivas"	Finnish	Timo Niemi	23 ◁
743	19	Iceland	11	Anna Mjöll	"Sjúbídú"	Icelandic	Anna Mjöll Ólafsdóttir; Ólafur Gaukur Þórhallsson	13
744	20	Poland	3	Kasia Kowalska	"Chcę znać swój grzech"	Polish	Robert Amirian; Kasia Kowalska	15
745	21	Bosnia and Herzegovina	4	Amila Glamočak	"Za našu ljubav"	Bosnian	Sinan Alimanović; Adnan Bajramović; Aida Frljak	22
746	22	Slovakia	2	Marcel Palonder	"Kým nás máš"	Slovak	Juraj Burian; Jozef Urban	18
747	23	Sweden	36	One More Time	"Den vilda"	Swedish	Nanne Grönvall; Peter Grönvall	3

Eurovision Song Contest 1997
#	R/O	Country	#	Artist	Song	Language	Songwriter(s)	Placing
748	1	Cyprus	16	Hara and Andreas Konstantinou	"Mana mou" (Μάνα μου)	Greek	Constantina Konstantinou	5
749	2	Turkey	19	Şebnem Paker and Grup Etnic	"Dinle"	Turkish	Mehtap Alnıtemiz; Levent Çoker	3
750	3	Norway	37	Tor Endresen	"San Francisco"	Norwegian	Tor Endresen; Arne Myksvoll	24 ◁
751	4	Austria	36	Bettina Soriat	"One Step"	German	Marc Berry; Ina Siber	21
752	5	Ireland	32	Marc Roberts	"Mysterious Woman"	English	John Farry	2
753	6	Slovenia	4	Tanja Ribič	"Zbudi se"	Slovene	Saša Lošić; Zoran Predin	10
754	7	Switzerland	41	Barbara Berta	"Dentro di me"	Italian	Barbara Berta	22
755	8	Netherlands	39	Mrs. Einstein	"Niemand heeft nog tijd"	Dutch	Ed Hooijmans	22
756	9	Italy	36	Jalisse	"Fiumi di parole"	Italian	Carmen di Domenico; Alessandra Drusian; Fabio Ricci	4
757	10	Spain	37	Marcos Llunas	"Sin rencor"	Spanish	Marcos Llunas	6
758	11	Germany	41	Bianca Shomburg	"Zeit"	German	Bernd Meinunger; Ralph Siegel	18
759	12	Poland	4	Anna Maria Jopek	"Ale jestem"	Polish	Magda Czapińska; Tomasz Lewandowski	11
760	13	Estonia	3	Maarja	"Keelatud maa"	Estonian	Harmo Kallaste; Kaari Sillamaa	8
761	14	Bosnia and Herzegovina	5	Alma Čardžić	"Goodbye"	Bosnian	Sinan Alimanović; Milić Vukašinović	18
762	15	Portugal	33	Célia Lawson	"Antes do adeus"	Portuguese	Rosa Lobato de Faria; Thilo Krasmann	24 ◁
763	16	Sweden	37	Blond	"Bara hon älskar mig"	Swedish	Stephan Berg	14
764	17	Greece	20	Marianna Zorba	"Horepse" (Χόρεψε)	Greek	Manolis Manouselis	12
765	18	Malta	10	Debbie Scerri	"Let Me Fly"	English	Ray Agius	9
766	19	Hungary	3	V.I.P.	"Miért kell, hogy elmenj?"	Hungarian	Krisztina Bokor Fekete; Sándor Józsa; Attila Kornyei; Viktor Rakonczai	12
767	20	Russia	3	Alla Pugacheva	"Primadonna" (Примадонна)	Russian	Alla Pugacheva	15
768	21	Denmark	28	Kølig Kaj	"Stemmen i mit liv"	Danish	Thomas Lægaard; Lars Pedersen	16
769	22	France	40	Fanny	"Sentiments songes"	French	Jean-Paul Dréau	7
770	23	Croatia	5	E.N.I.	"Probudi me"	Croatian	Alida Šarar; Davor Tolja	17
771	24	United Kingdom	40	Katrina and the Waves	"Love Shine a Light"	English	Kimberley Rew	1
772	25	Iceland	12	Paul Oscar	"Minn hinsti dans"	Icelandic	Páll Óskar Hjálmtýsson; Trausti Haraldsson	20

Eurovision Song Contest 1998
#	R/O	Country	#	Artist	Song	Language	Songwriter(s)	Placing
773	1	Croatia	6	Danijela	"Neka mi ne svane"	Croatian	Petar Grašo	5
774	2	Greece	21	Thalassa	"Mia krifi evaisthisia" (Μια κρυφή ευαισθησία)	Greek	Yiannis Malachias; Yiannis Valvis	20
775	3	France	41	Marie Line	"Où aller"	French	Moïse Crespy; Jean-Philippe Dary; Marie-Line Marolany; Micaël Sene	24
776	4	Spain	38	Mikel Herzog	"¿Qué voy a hacer sin ti?"	Spanish	Alberto Estébanez; Mikel Herzog	16
777	5	Switzerland	42	Gunvor	"Lass ihn"	German	Egon Egemann; Gunvor Guggisberg	25 ◁
778	6	Slovakia	3	Katarína Hasprová	"Modlitba"	Slovak	Gabriel Dušík; Anna Wepperyová	21
779	7	Poland	5	Sixteen	"To takie proste"	Polish	Olga Pruszkowska; Jarosław Pruszkowski	17
780	8	Israel	21	Dana International	"Diva" (דיווה)	Hebrew	Yoav Ginai; Svika Pick	1
781	9	Germany	42	Guildo Horn	"Guildo hat euch lieb"	German	Stefan Raab	7
782	10	Malta	11	Chiara	"The One That I Love"	English	Sunny Aquilina; Jason Cassar	3
783	11	Hungary	4	Charlie	"A holnap már nem lesz szomorú"	Hungarian	Attila Horváth; István Lerch	23
784	12	Slovenia	5	Vili Resnik	"Naj bogovi slišijo"	Slovene	Matjaž Vlašič; Urša Vlašič	18
785	13	Ireland	33	Dawn Martin	"Is Always Over Now"	English	Gerry Morgan	9
786	14	Portugal	34	Alma Lusa	"Se eu te pudesse abraçar"	Portuguese	José Cid	12
787	15	Romania	2	Mălina Olinescu	"Eu cred"	Romanian	Adrian Romcescu; Liliana Ștefan	22
788	16	United Kingdom	41	Imaani	"Where Are You?"	English	Scott English; Phil Manikiza; Simon Stirling	2
789	17	Cyprus	17	Michael Hajiyanni	"Genesis" (Γένεσις)	Greek	Michael Hajiyanni; Zenon Zindilis	11
790	18	Netherlands	40	Edsilia	"Hemel en aarde"	Dutch	Jochem Fluitsma; Eric van Tijn	4
791	19	Sweden	38	Jill Johnson	"Kärleken är"	Swedish	Håkan Almqvist; Ingela "Pling" Forsman; Bobby Ljunggren	10
792	20	Belgium	41	Mélanie Cohl	"Dis oui"	French	Philippe Swan	6
793	21	Finland	35	Edea	"Aava"	Finnish	Alexi Ahoniemi; Tommy Mansikka-Aho	15
794	22	Norway	38	Lars A. Fredriksen	"Alltid sommer"	Norwegian	David Eriksen; Linda Andernach Johannesen; Per Kristian Ottestad	8
795	23	Estonia	4	Koit Toome	"Mere lapsed"	Estonian	Peeter Pruuli; Maria Rahula; Tomi Rahula	12
796	24	Turkey	20	Tüzmen	"Unutamazsın"	Turkish	Canan Tunç; Erdinç Tunç	14
797	25	Macedonia	1	Vlado Janevski	"Ne zori, zoro" (Не зори, зоро)	Macedonian	Vlado Janevski; Grigor Koprov	19

Eurovision Song Contest 1999
#	R/O	Country	#	Artist	Song	Language	Songwriter(s)	Placing
798	1	Lithuania	2	Aistė	"Strazdas"	Samogitian	Sigitas Geda; Linas Rimša	20
799	2	Belgium	42	Vanessa Chinitor	"Like the Wind"	English	Ilia Beyers; Wim Claes; Emma Philippa Hjälmås; John Terra	12
800	3	Spain	39	Lydia	"No quiero escuchar"	Spanish	Adolfo Carmona Zamarreno; Carlos López González; Alejandro Piqueras Ramírez; Fernando Rodríguez Fernández	23 ◁
801	4	Croatia	7	Doris Dragović	"Marija Magdalena"	Croatian	Tonči Huljić; Vjekoslava Huljić	4
802	5	United Kingdom	42	Precious	"Say It Again"	English	Paul Varney	12
803	6	Slovenia	6	Darja Švajger	"For a Thousand Years"	English	Primož Peterca	11
804	7	Turkey	21	Tuba Önal and Grup Mistik	"Dön Artık"	Turkish	Canan Tunç; Erdinç Tunç	16
805	8	Norway	39	Van Eijk	"Living My Life Without You"	English	Stig André van Eijk	14
806	9	Denmark	29	Trine Jepsen and Michael Teschl	"This Time I Mean It"	English	Ebbe Ravn	8
807	10	France	42	Nayah	"Je veux donner ma voix"	French	Gilles Arcens; René Colombies; Pascal Graczyk; Luigi Rutigliano	19
808	11	Netherlands	41	Marlayne	"One Good Reason"	English	Alan Michael; Tjeerd van Zanen	8
809	12	Poland	6	Mietek Szcześniak	"Przytul mnie mocno"	Polish	Seweryn Krajewski; Wojciech Ziembicki	18
810	13	Iceland	13	Selma	"All Out of Luck"	English	Selma Björnsdóttir; Sveinbjörn I. Baldvinsson; Þorvaldur Bjarni Þorvaldsson	2
811	14	Cyprus	18	Marlain	"Tha'ne erotas" (Θα'ναι έρωτας)	Greek	George Kallis; Andreas Karanicolas	22
812	15	Sweden	39	Charlotte Nilsson	"Take Me to Your Heaven"	English	Lars Diedricson; Gert Lengstrand	1
813	16	Portugal	35	Rui Bandeira	"Como tudo começou"	Portuguese	Tó Andrade; Jorge do Carmo	21
814	17	Ireland	34	The Mullans	"When You Need Me"	English	Bronagh Mullan	17
815	18	Austria	37	Bobbie Singer	"Reflection"	English	Dave Moskin	10
816	19	Israel	22	Eden	"Happy Birthday"	Hebrew, English	Gabriel Butler; Moshe Datz; Ya'akov Lamai; Jacky Oved	5
817	20	Malta	12	Times Three	"Believe 'n Peace"	English	Christopher Scicluna; Moira Stafrace	15
818	21	Germany	43	Sürpriz	"Journey to Jerusalem – Kudüs'e Seyahat"	German, Turkish, English	Bernd Meinunger; Ralph Siegel	3
819	22	Bosnia and Herzegovina	6	Dino and Béatrice	"Putnici"	Bosnian, French	Dino Dervišhalidović	7
820	23	Estonia	5	Evelin Samuel and Camille	"Diamond of Night"	English	Maian Kärmas; Priit Pajusaar; Glen Pilvre; Kaari Sillamaa	6

=== 2000s ===
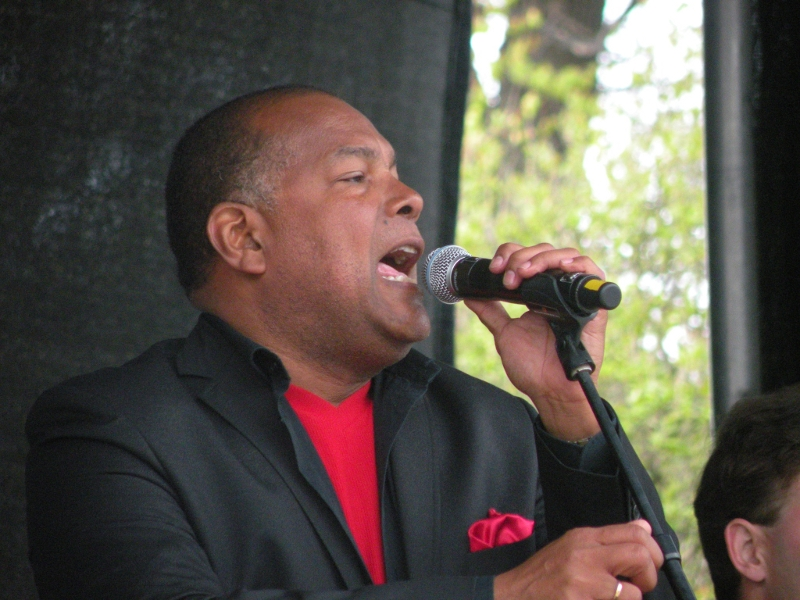
Dave Benton became the first black artist to win the contest, winning alongside Tanel Padar in 2001.

Eurovision Song Contest 2000
#	R/O	Country	#	Artist	Song	Language	Songwriter(s)	Placing
821	1	Israel	23	PingPong	"Sameach" (שמייח)	Hebrew	Roy Arad; Guy Asif; Ronen Ben Tal	22
822	2	Netherlands	42	Linda	"No Goodbyes"	English	Ellert Driessen; John O'Hare	13
823	3	United Kingdom	43	Nicki French	"Don't Play That Song Again"	English	Gerry Shephard; John Springate	16
824	4	Estonia	6	Ines	"Once in a Lifetime"	English	Jana Hallas; Alar Kotkas; Ilmar Laisaar; Pearu Paulus	4
825	5	France	43	Sofia Mestari	"On aura le ciel"	French	Benoît Heinrich; Pierre Legay	23
826	6	Romania	3	Taxi	"The Moon"	English	Dan Teodorescu	17
827	7	Malta	13	Claudette Pace	"Desire"	English	Gerard James Borg; Philip Vella	8
828	8	Norway	40	Charmed	"My Heart Goes Boom"	English	Morten Henriksen; Tore Madsen	11
829	9	Russia	4	Alsou	"Solo"	English	Brandon Barnes; Andrew Lane	2
830	10	Belgium	43	Nathalie Sorce	"Envie de vivre"	French	Silvio Pezzuto	24 ◁
831	11	Cyprus	19	Voice	"Nomiza" (Νόμιζα)	Greek, Italian	Silvia M. Klemm; Alexandros Panayi	21
832	12	Iceland	14	August and Telma	"Tell Me!"	English	Örlygur Smári; Sigurður Örn Jónsson	12
833	13	Spain	40	Serafín Zubiri	"Colgado de un sueño"	Spanish	José María Purón	18
834	14	Denmark	30	Olsen Brothers	"Fly on the Wings of Love"	English	Jørgen Olsen	1
835	15	Germany	44	Stefan Raab	"Wadde hadde dudde da?"	German, English	Stefan Raab	5
836	16	Switzerland	43	Jane Bogaert	"La vita cos'è?"	Italian	Thomas Marin; Bernie Staub	20
837	17	Croatia	8	Goran Karan	"Kad zaspu anđeli"	Croatian	Nenad Ninčević; Zdenko Runjić	9
838	18	Sweden	40	Roger Pontare	"When Spirits Are Calling My Name"	English	Peter Dahl; Thomas Holmstrand; Linda Jansson	7
839	19	Macedonia	2	XXL	"100% te ljubam" (100% те љубам)	Macedonian, English	Dragan Karanfilovski; Orče Zafirovski	15
840	20	Finland	36	Nina Åström	"A Little Bit"	English	Luca Genta; Gerrit aan 't Goor	18
841	21	Latvia	1	Brainstorm	"My Star"	English	Renārs Kaupers	3
842	22	Turkey	22	Pınar and the S.O.S.	"Yorgunum Anla"	Turkish, English	Pınar Ayhan; Sühan Ayhan; Orkun Yazgan	10
843	23	Ireland	35	Eamonn Toal	"Millennium of Love"	English	Gerry Simpson; Raymond J. Smyth	6
844	24	Austria	38	The Rounder Girls	"All to You"	English	Dave Moskin	14

Eurovision Song Contest 2001
#	R/O	Country	#	Artist	Song	Language	Songwriter(s)	Placing
845	1	Netherlands	43	Michelle	"Out on My Own"	English	André Remkes; Dirk Jan Vermeij	18
846	2	Iceland	15	Two Tricky	"Angel"	English	Einar Bárðarson; Magnús Þór Sigmundsson	22 ◁
847	3	Bosnia and Herzegovina	7	Nino	"Hano"	Bosnian, English	Nino Pršeš	14
848	4	Norway	41	Haldor Lægreid	"On My Own"	English	Ole Henrik Antonsen; Tom-Steinar Hanssen; Ole Jørgen Olsen	22 ◁
849	5	Israel	24	Tal Sondak	"Ein Davar" (אין דבר)	Hebrew	Yair Klinger; Shimrit Orr	16
850	6	Russia	5	Mumiy Troll	"Lady Alpine Blue"	English	Ilya Lagutenko	12
851	7	Sweden	41	Friends	"Listen to Your Heartbeat"	English	Thomas G:son; Henrik Sethsson	5
852	8	Lithuania	3	Skamp	"You Got Style"	English, Lithuanian	Vilius Alesius; Viktoras Diawara; Erica Jennings	13
853	9	Latvia	2	Arnis Mednis	"Too Much"	English	Arnis Mednis; Gustavs Terzens	18
854	10	Croatia	9	Vanna	"Strings of My Heart"	English	Tonči Huljić; Vjekoslava Huljić	10
855	11	Portugal	36	MTM	"Só sei ser feliz assim"	Portuguese	Marco Quelhas	17
856	12	Ireland	36	Gary O'Shaughnessy	"Without Your Love"	English	Pat Sheridan	21
857	13	Spain	41	David Civera	"Dile que la quiero"	Spanish	Alejandro Abad	6
858	14	France	44	Natasha St-Pier	"Je n'ai que mon âme"	French, English	Jill Kapler	4
859	15	Turkey	23	Sedat Yüce	"Sevgiliye Son"	Turkish, English	Figen Çakmak; Nurdan Güneri; Semih Güneri	11
860	16	United Kingdom	44	Lindsay Dracass	"No Dream Impossible"	English	Russ Ballard; Chris Winter	15
861	17	Slovenia	7	Nuša Derenda	"Energy"	English	Lucienne Lončina; Matjaž Vlašič	7
862	18	Poland	7	Piasek	"2 Long"	English	Robert Chojnacki; Andrzej Piaseczny	20
863	19	Germany	45	Michelle	"Wer Liebe lebt"	German, English	Eva Richter; Matthias Stingl; Gino Trovatello	8
864	20	Estonia	7	Tanel Padar, Dave Benton and 2XL	"Everybody"	English	Maian-Anna Kärmas; Ivar Must	1
865	21	Malta	14	Fabrizio Faniello	"Another Summer Night"	English	Georgina Abela; Paul Abela	9
866	22	Greece	22	Antique	"Die for You"	Greek, English	Antonis Pappas; Nikos Terzis	3
867	23	Denmark	31	Rollo and King	"Never Ever Let You Go"	English	Stefan Nielsen; Søren Poppe	2

Eurovision Song Contest 2002
#	R/O	Country	#	Artist	Song	Language	Songwriter(s)	Placing
868	1	Cyprus	20	One	"Gimme"	English	George Theofanous	6
869	2	United Kingdom	45	Jessica Garlick	"Come Back"	English	Martyn Baylay	3
870	3	Austria	39	Manuel Ortega	"Say a Word"	English	Alexander Kahr; Robert Pflugler	18
871	4	Greece	23	Michalis Rakintzis	"S.A.G.A.P.O."	English	Michalis Rakintzis	17
872	5	Spain	42	Rosa	"Europe's Living a Celebration"	Spanish	Toni Ten; Xasqui Ten	7
873	6	Croatia	10	Vesna Pisarović	"Everything I Want"	English	Milana Vlaović	11
874	7	Russia	6	Prime Minister	"Northern Girl"	English	Irina Antonyan; Kim Breitburg; Evgeniy Fridlyand; Karen Kavaleryan	10
875	8	Estonia	8	Sahlene	"Runaway"	English	Jana Hallas; Alar Kotkas; Ilmar Laisaar; Pearu Paulus	3
876	9	Macedonia	3	Karolina	"Od nas zavisi" (Од нас зависи)	Macedonian	Vladimir Krstevski; Nikola Perevski	19
877	10	Israel	25	Sarit Hadad	"Light a Candle"	Hebrew, English	Yoav Ginai; Svika Pick	12
878	11	Switzerland	44	Francine Jordi	"Dans le jardin de mon âme"	French	Francine Lehmann	22
879	12	Sweden	42	Afro-dite	"Never Let It Go"	English	Marcos Ubeda	8
880	13	Finland	37	Laura	"Addicted to You"	English	Janina Frostell; Maki Kolehmainen; Tracy Lipp	20
881	14	Denmark	32	Malene	"Tell Me Who You Are"	English	Michael Ronson	24 ◁
882	15	Bosnia and Herzegovina	8	Maja	"Na jastuku za dvoje" (На јастуку за двоје)	Serbian, English	Ružica Čavić; Stevo Cvikić; Dragan Mijatović	13
883	16	Belgium	44	Sergio and the Ladies	"Sister"	English	Dirk Paelinck; Marc Paelinck	13
884	17	France	45	Sandrine François	"Il faut du temps"	French	Rick Allison; Patrick Bruel; Marie-Florence Gros	5
885	18	Germany	46	Corinna May	"I Can't Live Without Music"	English	Bernd Meinunger; Ralph Siegel	21
886	19	Turkey	24	Buket Bengisu and Group Safir	"Leylaklar Soldu Kalbinde"	Turkish, English	Figen Çakmak; Fani Hodara; Sami Hodara	16
887	20	Malta	15	Ira Losco	"7th Wonder"	English	Gerard James Borg; Philip Vella	2
888	21	Romania	4	Monica Anghel and Marcel Pavel	"Tell Me Why"	English	Mirela Fugaru; Ionel Tudor	9
889	22	Slovenia	8	Sestre	"Samo ljubezen"	Slovene	Barbara Pešut; Robert Pešut	13
890	23	Latvia	3	Marie N	"I Wanna"	English	Marija Naumova; Marats Samauskis	1
891	24	Lithuania	4	Aivaras	"Happy You"	English	Aivaras Stepukonis	23

Eurovision Song Contest 2003
#	R/O	Country	#	Artist	Song	Language	Songwriter(s)	Placing
892	1	Iceland	16	Birgitta	"Open Your Heart"	English	Birgitta Haukdal; Hallgrímur Óskarsson; Sveinbjörn I. Baldvinsson	8
893	2	Austria	40	Alf Poier	"Weil der Mensch zählt"	German (Note: Specifically Styrian, a Southern Bavarian dialect)	Alf Poier	6
894	3	Ireland	37	Mickey Harte	"We've Got the World"	English	Martin Brannigan; Keith Molloy	11
895	4	Turkey	25	Sertab Erener	"Everyway That I Can"	English	Demir Demirkan; Sertab Erener	1
896	5	Malta	16	Lynn Chircop	"To Dream Again"	English	Cynthia Sammut; Alfred Zammit	25
897	6	Bosnia and Herzegovina	9	Mija Martina	"Ne brini"	Croatian, English	Arjana Kunštek; Ines Prajo	16
898	7	Portugal	37	Rita Guerra	"Deixa-me sonhar"	Portuguese, English	Paulo Martins	22
899	8	Croatia	11	Claudia Beni	"Više nisam tvoja"	Croatian, English	Andrej Babić	15
900	9	Cyprus	21	Stelios Constantas	"Feeling Alive"	English	Stelios Constantas	20
901	10	Germany	47	Lou	"Let's Get Happy"	English	Bernd Meinunger; Ralph Siegel	11
902	11	Russia	7	t.A.T.u.	"Ne ver', ne boysia" (Не верь, не бойся)	Russian	Mars Lasar; Valery Polienko	3
903	12	Spain	43	Beth	"Dime"	Spanish	Amaya Martínez; Jesús María Pérez	8
904	13	Israel	26	Lior Narkis	"Words for Love"	Hebrew	Yossi Gispan; Yoni Ro'eh	19
905	14	Netherlands	44	Esther Hart	"One More Night"	English	Alan Michael; Tjeerd van Zanen	13
906	15	United Kingdom	46	Jemini	"Cry Baby"	English	Martin Isherwood	26 ◁
907	16	Ukraine	1	Olexandr	"Hasta la vista"	English	Svika Pick; Mirit Shem Or	14
908	17	Greece	24	Mando	"Never Let You Go"	English	Mando; Teri Siganos	17
909	18	Norway	42	Jostein Hasselgård	"I'm Not Afraid to Move On"	English	Arve Furset; VJ Strøm	4
910	19	France	46	Louisa Baïleche	"Monts et merveilles"	French	Hocine Hallaf	18
911	20	Poland	8	Ich Troje	"Keine Grenzen – Żadnych granic"	German, Polish, Russian	André Franke; Joachim Horn-Bernges; Jacek Łągwa; Michał Wiśniewski	7
912	21	Latvia	4	F.L.Y.	"Hello from Mars"	English	Mārtiņš Freimanis; Lauris Reiniks	24
913	22	Belgium	45	Urban Trad	"Sanomi"	Imaginary	Yves Barbieux	2
914	23	Estonia	9	Ruffus	"Eighties Coming Back"	English	Vaiko Eplik	21
915	24	Romania	5	Nicola	"Don't Break My Heart"	English	Mihai Alexandru; Nicola	10
916	25	Sweden	43	Fame	"Give Me Your Love"	English	Calle Kindbom; Carl Lösnitz	5
917	26	Slovenia	9	Karmen	"Nanana"	English	Karmen Stavec; Martin Štibernik	23

== Entries which failed to qualify ==
Qualifying competitions were held in advance of the 1993 and 1996 editions of the contest, as a measure to reduce the number of competing entries. In 1993 Kvalifikacija za Millstreet was held between seven new Eastern European countries competing for three places in the contest proper; in 1996 an audio-only competition was held for all interested participants, with Norway automatically qualified as host country and 29 additional countries competing for 22 places in the contest. Unlike the semi-final system in place since 2004, in which countries that do not advance from the semi-finals are still credited as having participated in the contest, countries which competed in these qualifying rounds but failed to progress to the main contest have not been credited with having participated in that year's contest.

Kvalifikacija za Millstreet
Country	Artist	Song	Language	Songwriter(s)
Estonia	Janika Sillamaa	"Muretut meelt ja südametuld"	Estonian	Leelo Tungal; Andres Valkonen
Hungary	Andrea Szulák	"Árva reggel"	Hungarian	Emese Hatvani; György Jakab; László Pásztor
Romania	Dida Drăgan	"Nu pleca"	Romanian	Dida Drăgan; Adrian Ordean
Slovakia	Elán	"Amnestia na neveru"	Slovak	Ján Baláž; Boris Filan; Jozef Ráž

Eurovision Song Contest 1996 Qualifying Round
Country	Artist	Song	Language	Songwriter(s)
Denmark	Dorthe Andersen and Martin Loft	"Kun med dig"	Danish	Keld Heick; Jascha Richter
Germany	Leon	"Planet of Blue"	German	Hanne Haller; Anna Rubach
Hungary	Gjon Delhusa	"Fortuna"	Hungarian	Gjon Delhusa
Israel	Galit Bell	"Shalom Olam" (שלום עולם)	Hebrew	Eyal Madan; Doron Vitenberg
Macedonia	Kaliopi	"Samo ti" (Само ти)	Macedonian	Kaliopi Grill
Romania	Monica Anghel and Sincron	"Rugă pentru pacea lumii"	Romanian	Cornel Fugaru; Mirela Voiculescu
Russia	Andrey Kosinskiy	"Ya eto ya" (Я это я)	Russian	Nikolai Denisov; Andrey Kosinskiy

== Withdrawn and disqualified entries ==
On a number of occasions entries into the contest have been prevented from competing at a late stage, either through withdrawal by the participating broadcaster or through disqualification by the European Broadcasting Union. The list below highlights cases where an entry for a given country had been planned in a particular year but which ultimately did not occur, either by withdrawal, disqualification or the cancellation of the contest.

On a number of occasions participation in the contest has been either suggested or attempted by countries which are ineligible due to a lack of a participating EBU member broadcaster, such as past media reports of interest by broadcasters in China, Kosovo, Liechtenstein and Qatar. Participation has also been suggested for a number of nations and territories whose participation is currently covered by another country. Potential entries from Wales and Scotland (currently countries of the United Kingdom) and the Faroe Islands (currently a territory of Denmark) have been reported, but are generally prevented due to the exclusive participation rights of the sovereign nation to which they belong. Wales and Scotland have participated in other Eurovision events where the United Kingdom as a whole do not participate, including the Junior Eurovision Song Contest and Eurovision Choir.

Rescinded Eurovision entries
Year	Country	Artist	Song	Language	Reason	Participated with another song or artist	Ref(s)
1967	Italy	Claudio Villa	"Non pensare a me"	Italian	Disqualified	Yes	
1968	Norway	Odd Børre	"Jeg har aldri vært så glad i noen som deg"	Norwegian	Withdrawn	Yes	
1971	Switzerland	Peter, Sue and Marc	"Légende de mon pays"	French	Withdrawn	Yes	
1973	Malta	No artist or song selected			Withdrawn	No	
1974	France	Dani	"La Vie à vingt-cinq ans"	French	Withdrawn	No	
1976	Germany	Tony Marshall	"Der Star"	German	Disqualified	Yes	
1977	Tunisia	No artist or song selected			Withdrawn	No	
1978	Greece	Robert Williams and Anna Vissi	"Na xereis s' agapo" (Να ξέρεις σ' αγαπώ)	Greek	Disqualified	Yes	
1979	Turkey	Maria Rita Epik and 21. Peron	"Seviyorum"	Turkish	Withdrawn	No	
1982	Greece	Themis Adamantidis	"Sarantapente kopelies" (Σαρανταπέντε κοπελιές)	Greek	Disqualified	No	
1985	Belgium	Mireille Capelle	"Vannacht"	Dutch	Withdrawn	Yes	
1986	Greece	Polina	"Wagon-lit" (Βαγκόν λι)	Greek	Withdrawn	No	
1988	Cyprus	Yiannis Dimitrou	"Thimame" (Θυμάμαι)	Greek	Disqualified	No	
1990	Austria	Duett	"Das Beste"	German	Disqualified	Yes	
1992	Switzerland	Géraldine Olivier	"Soleil, soleil"	German	Disqualified	Yes	
1999	Bosnia and Herzegovina	Hari Mata Hari	"Starac i more"	Bosnian	Disqualified	Yes	
1999	Germany	Corinna May	"Hör den Kindern einfach zu"	German	Disqualified	Yes	
2002	Lithuania	B'Avarija	"We All"	English	Disqualified	Yes	

== See also ==
- List of countries in the Eurovision Song Contest
- List of Junior Eurovision Song Contest entries
