= Switzerland in the Eurovision Song Contest 1983 =

- Eurovision Song Contest 1983
- Participating broadcaster: Swiss Broadcasting Corporation (SRG SSR)
- Country: Switzerland
- Selection process: Concours Eurovision de la Chanson 1983
- Selection date: 26 March 1983

Competing entry
- Song: "Io così non ci sto"
- Artist: Mariella Farré
- Songwriters: Thomas Gonzenbach; Remo Kessler; Nella Martinetti

Placement
- Final result: 15th, 28 points

Participation chronology

Switzerland was represented at the Eurovision Song Contest 1983 with the song "Io così non ci sto", composed by Thomas Gonzenbach and Remo Kessler, with lyrics by Nella Martinetti, and performed by Mariella Farré. The Swiss participating broadcaster, the Swiss Broadcasting Corporation (SRG SSR), selected its entry for the contest through a national final.

== Before Eurovision ==
=== Regional selections ===
The Swiss Broadcasting Corporation (SRG SSR) held a national final to select its entry for the Eurovision Song Contest 1983. The national final was a collaboration between three broadcasters that composed SRG SSR: the Swiss-German and Romansh broadcaster Schweizer Fernsehen der deutschen und rätoromanischen Schweiz (SF DRS), the Swiss-French broadcaster Télévision suisse romande (TSR), and the Swiss-Italian broadcaster Televisione svizzera di lingua italiana (TSI). Since 1982, unlike previous Swiss national finals, where all composite broadcasters internally selected their entries, said broadcasters could hold their own regional selection methods.

==== Ed è subito sabato ====
Swiss-Italian broadcaster Televisione svizzera di lingua italiana (TSI) held its preliminary round in the radio program Ed è subito sabato. The event consisted of two semifinals on 5 and 11 December and a final on 18 December with each round airing at 10:30 CET. The voting consisted of a jury of radio and television license holders and the public. The three highest scoring songs would advance to the nationwide final.

It is known that ten songs competed in the event, however little information regarding the show's events and full lineup are known. Among the participants was Marc Dietrich, who represented Switzerland in 1971, 1976, 1979, and 1981 as a member of Peter, Sue & Marc. Mariella Farré would later represent 1985 alongside Pino Gasparini.

===== Final =====
The final was broadcast on 11 December 1982 at 10:30 CET. The running order and the majority of the songs are currently unknown.

Ed è subito sabato (Final) — 18 December 1982 (known songs)
Artist(s)	Song	Songwriter(s)		Result
Artist(s)	Song	Composer	Lyricist	Result
I Centrocittà	"Vivo in un mundo"	Ferninando Morandi		Qualified
Marc Dietrich	"Grazie"	Nella Martinetti		—N/a
Mariella Farré	"Io cosí non ci sto"	Remo Kessler; Thomas Gonzenbach	Nella Martinetti	Qualified
Ray & Corry Knobel	"Canzone amara"	Corry Knobel		Qualified

==== Swiss-German and Romansh selection ====
Following the successful reception of the 1982 Swiss-German preliminary round, Schweizer Radio DRS (DRS) once again held regional public selection rounds to select the Swiss-German songs in the nationwide national final.

About 18 songs were set to be selected by an internal jury. The submission deadline was on 30 October 1982 and applicants must be at least 17 years old. Singers and songwriters from Switzerland, Liechtenstein, or foreigners with residence from the two countries were allowed to submit their songs. A total of 101 songs were submitted, with 20 ultimately being selected.

The event consisted of two semifinals and a final. It was held in Zurich, was solely broadcast on DRS radio and was hosted by Ueli Beck. The songs were accompanied by Hans Moeckel and the DRS Big Band. The three highest scoring songs in the final advanced to the nationwide Swiss national final. Unlike last year, the entries were prerecorded from the day before the rounds were broadcast to prevent live technical difficulties.

Conflicting reports between Swiss press and the participants claim either 17 or 20 songs performed in two semifinals, with ten songs competing in each. Of the reported 20 entrants, only 12 artists and 17 songs are identified and/or implied to take part. Among the participants was the group Rainy Day, which represented Switzerland in 1984. The songs "La stiala" and "Mira cheu" by Rezia Spontana were the first songs in Romansh to compete in a Swiss Eurovision preselection.

List of known participants and entries
Artist(s)	Song	Songwriter(s)	
Artist(s)	Song	Composer	Lyricist
Anetta & Wolfgang	Unknown		
Angela	"Mona Lisa"	Philipp Martin	
Angela	Unknown		
Bernadette Wälle	"Eine Nacht mit dir"	Unknown	
Bernadette Wälle	"Träume"	Unknown	
Christian Hunziker	"D'Änglischüebig"	Christian Hunziker	
Colette Meury	"Wo bist du"	Unknown	
Dany Bolla	"Ein bißchen Nostalgie"	Günther Loose; Rolf Häfliger (Note: Specific songwriting roles are unknown.)	
Ireen Indra	Unknown		
Katrin Hasler Trio	Unknown		
Manuela Felice	"Odulidam"	Walter Kehl	
Manuela Felice	Unknown		
Marco Nomisch	"Picknick in der Badewanne"	Marco Nomisch	
Rainy Day	Unknown		
Rainy Day	Unknown		
Rezia Spontana	"La stiala"	Benedetto Vigne	
Rezia Spontana	"Mira cheu"	Peter Wydler	Benedetto Vigne

===== Semifinal 1 =====
The first semifinal was broadcast on 4 December 1982 from 19:30 to 21:30 CET. Throughout the event, the voting consisted of a 15-member jury panel of radio and television staff members and radio listeners who called designated phone numbers for each song of their choice. Unlike the previous year, the studio audience did not have voting rights to "ensure a fair selection process." The five best scoring songs in each semifinal advanced to the final. The running order, the majority of the songs, and one artist are unknown.

Semifinal 1 — 4 December 1982 (known songs)
Artist(s)	Song	Result
Anetta & Wolfgang	Unknown	Unknown
Angela	Unknown	Unknown
Bernadette Wälle	Unknown (Note: Unknown which semifinals either of her songs were performed in)	—N/a
Colette Meury	"Wo bist du"	Unknown
Dany Bolla	"Ein bißchen Nostalgie"	Unknown
Manuela Felice	Unknown (Note: Unknown which semifinal "Odulidam" was performed in)	Unknown
Marco Nomisch	"Picknick in der Badewanne"	Unknown
Rainy Day	Unknown	Unknown
Rezia Spontana	Unknown (Note: Unknown which semifinals either of their songs were performed in)	Qualified

===== Semifinal 2 =====
The second semifinal was broadcast on 11 December 1982 at 19:30 CET. The running order, the majority of the songs, and two artists are unknown.

Semifinal 2 — 11 December 1982 (known songs)
Artist(s)	Song	Result
Angela	"Mona Lisa"	Qualified
Bernadette Wälle	Unknown	—N/a
Christian Hunziker	"D'Änglischüebig"	Qualified
Ireen Indra	Unknown	Unknown
Katrin Hasler Trio	Unknown	Unknown
Manuela Felice	Unknown	Unknown
Rainy Day	Unknown	Unknown
Rezia Spontana	Unknown	Qualified

===== Final =====
The final was broadcast on 18 December 1982 from 19:30 CET. About 2,000 telephone calls from radio listeners were received to partly decide the qualifiers. The running order and five remaining qualifiers are unknown.

Final — 18 December 1982 (known songs)
Artist(s)	Song	Place
Manuela Felice	"Odulidam"	1
Angela	"Mona Lisa"	2
Christian Hunziker	"D'Änglischüebig"	3
Rezia Spontana	"Mira cheu"	4
Rezia Spontana	"La stiala"	5

=== Concours Eurovision de la Chanson 1983 ===
SRG SSR received 176 total song submissions (101 in German, 46 in French, and 29 in Italian), and ultimately selected nine to take part in the selection (three per language). Among the participants were Mariella Farré, who would later represent Switzerland in 1985, and Daniela Simons, who would later represent Switzerland in 1986.

Swiss German and Romansh broadcaster Schweizer Fernsehen der deutschen und rätoromanischen Schweiz (SF DRS) staged the national final on 26 March at 20:00 CET at its studios in Zurich. It was hosted by Marie-Thérèse Gwerder, with Hans Moeckel and Peter Jacques accompanying the performances with Moeckel's Big Band. Nicole, who won Eurovision for Germany in 1982, and Vivian Reed made guest appearances. The national final was broadcast on TV DRS and TSR (with commentary by Serge Moisson).

Participating entries
Broadcaster	Artist(s)	Song	Songwriter(s)		Language
Broadcaster	Artist(s)	Song	Composer(s)	Lyricist	Language
RTSI	Mariella Farré	"Io cosí non ci sto"	Remo Kessler; Thomas Gonzenbach	Nella Martinetti	Italian
RTSI	I Centrocittà	"Vivo in un mundo"	Ferninando Morandi		Italian
RTSI	Ray & Corry Knobel	"Canzone amara"	Corry Knobel		Italian
SF DRS	Manuela Felice	"Odulidam"	Walter Kehl		German
SF DRS	Angela	"Mona Lisa"	Philipp Martin		German
SF DRS	Christian Hunziker	"D'Änglischüebig"	Christian Hunziker		Swiss German, English
TSR	Alexandre Castel	"Elle était folle"	Alexandre Castel		French
TSR	Claude Lander	"Il faut juste vivre"	Claude Lander		French
TSR	Daniela Simons	"Dis-moi tout"	Alexandre Castel		French

The voting consisted of regional public votes which were sent to the three divisions of SRG SSR (DRS, TSR, TSI: German, French, and Italian speaking, respectively), a press jury, and a jury of music experts. Applications for viewers from Switzerland and Liechtenstein to join the regional juries were sent via postcard until 21 March, and 50 viewers from each canton were randomly selected to cast their votes to their broadcaster divisions via phone call. Additionally, one random voter in the public jury would be drawn to be invited to attend the Eurovision Song Contest as an audience member along with a companion. The selected voter was Yvonne Niederberger. Due to technical difficulties regarding the Swiss-Italian jury, their votes were announced later than scheduled. The winner was the song "Io cosí non ci sto", composed by Remo Kessler and Thomas Gonzenbach with lyrics from Nella Martinetti and performed by Mariella Farré.

Final — 26 March 1983
R/O	Artist(s)	Song	Regional Juries			Press Jury	Expert Jury	Total	Place
R/O	Artist(s)	Song	DRS	TSR	TSI	Press Jury	Expert Jury	Total	Place
1	Alexandre Castel	"Elle était folle"	2	3	3	1	7	16	8
2	Manuela Felice	"Odulidam"	8	10	7	7	6	38	3
3	Christian Hunziker	"D'Änglischüebig"	6	1	2	2	8	19	6
4	Mariella Farré	"Io così non ci sto"	7	6	10	10	10	43	1
5	I Centrocittà	"Vivo in un mondo"	5	4	6	6	4	25	4
6	Claude Lander	"Il faut juste vivre"	4	7	4	4	2	21	5
7	Ray & Corry Knobel	"Canzone amara"	3	5	5	5	1	19	6
8	Angela	"Mona Lisa"	10	8	8	8	5	39	2
9	Daniela Simons	"Dis-moi tout"	1	2	1	3	3	10	9

== At Eurovision ==
At the Eurovision Song Contest 1983, held at the Rudi-Sedlmayer-Halle in Munich, the Swiss entry was the eighth entry of the night following Spain and preceding Finland. The Swiss conductor at the contest was Robert Weber. At the close of voting, Switzerland had received 28 points, placing Switzerland in fifteenth place out of twenty entries, the country's worst placing and its first time placing outside of the top 10 since 1974.

=== Voting ===
Each participating broadcaster assembled a jury panel with at least eleven members. The jurors awarded 1-8, 10, and 12 points to their top ten songs.

Points awarded to Switzerland
Score	Country
12 points	
10 points	
8 points	
7 points	Italy; Yugoslavia
6 points	Austria
5 points	Luxembourg
4 points	
3 points	
2 points	
1 point	Belgium; Norway; Spain

Points awarded by Switzerland
Score	Country
12 points	Netherlands
10 points	France
8 points	United Kingdom
7 points	Israel
6 points	Portugal
5 points	Sweden
4 points	Finland
3 points	Luxembourg
2 points	Germany
1 point	Cyprus
