= Greece in the Eurovision Song Contest 1983 =

- Eurovision Song Contest 1983
- Participating broadcaster: Hellenic Broadcasting Corporation (ERT)
- Country: Greece
- Selection process: National final
- Selection date: 18 March 1983

Competing entry
- Song: "Mou les"
- Artist: Christie Stasinopoulou
- Songwriters: Antonis Plessas; Sofia Fildissi

Placement
- Final result: 14th, 32 points

Participation chronology

Greece was represented at the Eurovision Song Contest 1983 with the song "Mou les", composed by Antonis Plessas, with lyrics by Sofia Fildissi, and performed by Christie Stasinopoulou. The Greek participating broadcaster, the Hellenic Broadcasting Corporation (ERT), selected its entry through a national final.

== Before Eurovision ==
=== National final ===
The Hellenic Broadcasting Corporation (ERT) held the national final on 18 March 1983 at its television studios in Peania, hosted by Mako Georgiadou. Originally, there were 11 songs taking part, but song 7, "Horos tis nichtas" by Petros Dourdouvakis was possibly disqualified, as it was not included in the voting results. The winning song was chosen by a 50-member jury composed of "experts" and members of the public.

Final – 18 March 1983
R/O	Singer	Song	Place
1	Cleopatra	"Irini"	5
2	Nikos Nomikos	"Kalokerino dilino"	8
3	Ariel Konstandinidi	"Tha figo"	10
4	Gianna Komninou	"Matia mou melachrina"	7
5	Dimitris Lidos	"Ta dentra"	4
6	Dakis	"Agapi, agapi"	2
7	Petros Dourdouvakis	"Horos tis nichtas"	11
8	Christie Stasinopoulou	"Mou les"	1
9	Theodosia Stinga	"O profitis"	9
10	Dafni Bokota	"Ioulietta"	6
11	Alexandros Molfesis	"To hameno radevou"	3

== At Eurovision ==
The contest was broadcast on ERT1 and on radio station B Programma.

"Mou les" was performed tenth on the night (following Finland's "Fantasiaa" by Ami Aspelund and preceding the Netherlands' "Sing Me a Song" by Bernadette). At the close of voting, it had received 32 points, placing 14th in a field of 20. The conductor of the Greek entry was Mimis Plessas.

=== Voting ===
Points awarded to Greece
Score	Country
12 points	Cyprus; Spain
10 points	
8 points	
7 points	
6 points	
5 points	Finland
4 points	
3 points	France
2 points	
1 point	

Points awarded by Greece
Score	Country
12 points	Luxembourg
10 points	Sweden
8 points	Finland
7 points	France
6 points	Yugoslavia
5 points	United Kingdom
4 points	Austria
3 points	Israel
2 points	Italy
1 point	Germany
