= France in the Eurovision Song Contest 1983 =

- Eurovision Song Contest 1983
- Participating broadcaster: Antenne 2
- Country: France
- Selection process: National final
- Selection date: 20 March 1983

Competing entry
- Song: "Vivre"
- Artist: Guy Bonnet
- Songwriters: Guy Bonnet; Fulbert Cant

Placement
- Final result: 8th, 56 points

Participation chronology

France was represented at the Eurovision Song Contest 1983 with the song "Vivre", composed by Guy Bonnet, with lyrics by Fulbert Cant, and performed by Bonnet himself. The French participating broadcaster, Antenne 2, selected its entry through a national final. Bonnet had previously represented France in 1970.

== Before Eurovision ==
=== National final ===
Antenne 2 took on the responsibility of participating in Eurovision representing France in 1983, after the country had been absent from the 1982 contest when previous broadcaster Télévision Française 1 (TF1) opted out, citing the facile nature of the music on offer in Eurovision as they perceived it. Antenne 2 decided to choose its first entry via a broadcast national final. The national final was also aired in Canada's TVFQ 99 on 22 May.

The national final was held on 20 March 1983, hosted by Jean-Pierre Foucault and 1977 contest winner Marie Myriam. Fourteen songs took part with the winner chosen by a panel of TV viewers who were telephoned and asked to vote on the songs. Other participants included previous French representatives Isabelle Aubret (1962 and 1968) and Joël Prévost (1978).

R/O	Artist	Song	Place
1	Philippe Houbert	"Les manèges de l'amour"	12
2	Joël Prévost	"Je t'aime"	9
3	Claude Merlebois	"Je reviendrai"	8
4	Jean-Marc Courtois	"L'homme est un mobile"	7
5	Joséphine Coppola	"Passionément"	14
6	Kali	"Je vous oublie"	13
7	Guy Bonnet	"Vivre"	1
8	Rebecca	"Mais où est l'amour"	11
9	Isabelle Aubret	"France France"	3
10	Nicolas Leyani	"Quand je vois le soleil"	6
11	Jean-Paul Cara	"À Chantefrance"	5
12	Christine Fontane	"Avec"	10
13	La Compagnie Créole	"Vive le Douanier Rousseau"	2
14	Anne-Marie Gancel	"J'en appelle à la vie"	4

== At Eurovision ==
On the night of the final Bonnet performed first in the running order, preceding Norway. At the close of voting "Vivre" had received 56 points, placing France 8th of the 20 entries. The French jury awarded its 12 points to contest winners Luxembourg.

=== Voting ===
Points awarded to France
Score	Country
12 points	
10 points	Italy; Switzerland
8 points	
7 points	Greece
6 points	Finland
5 points	
4 points	Cyprus; Germany
3 points	Luxembourg; Norway; Portugal; Yugoslavia
2 points	Netherlands
1 point	Israel

Points awarded by France
Score	Country
12 points	Luxembourg
10 points	Germany
8 points	Israel
7 points	Italy
6 points	Sweden
5 points	United Kingdom
4 points	Portugal
3 points	Greece
2 points	Netherlands
1 point	Finland
