= Džuli =

1983 song by Daniel Popović

"Džuli (Julie)"

Single by Daniel Popović

from the album Julie
- B-side: "Come To My Adria"
- Released: 1983
- Recorded: 1982
- Genre: Pop
- Length: 2:58
- Label: Jugoton (original version); Ariola Records (English version)
- Composer: Daniel Popović
- Lyricists: Mario Mihaljević (both versions); Rajko Simunović (English version)
- Producers: Mato Došen (Jugoton); Giorgio Osana (Ariola)

Eurovision Song Contest 1983 entry
- Country: Yugoslavia
- Artist: Daniel
- Language: Serbo-Croatian
- Composer: Milan Popović
- Lyricist: Mario Mihaljević
- Conductor: Radovan Papović

Finals performance
- Final result: 4th
- Final points: 125

Entry chronology
- ◄ "Halo, Halo" (1982)
- "Ciao, amore" (1984) ►

Music video
- "Džuli" (original) on YouTube

"Džuli" (Serbo-Croatian Cyrillic: Џули; English version: "Julie") was the Yugoslav entry in the Eurovision Song Contest 1983, performed in Serbo-Croat by Montenegrin singer Daniel. It was performed 12th on the night, following the Netherlands' Bernadette with "Sing Me a Song" and preceding Cyprus' Stavros & Constantina with "I agapi akoma zi". At the close of voting, it received 125 points, and came 4th in a field of 20.

Daniel Popović also recorded the song in English (as "Julie") and Hebrew (as "Julia", under the pseudonym Daniel Popenthal).

It became a hit in Europe, being covered by artists such as Swedish dansband Wizex on the 1983 album Julie (as "Julie") with Swedish lyrics by Tommy Stjernfeldt. According to a list of top five best Croatian songs of all time compiled by RTL television show Croatian Number One published in 2021 and taking in account week at number one on charts, number of sales and air time, "Džuli" ranked at number five.

It was succeeded as Yugoslav representative at the 1984 contest by Ida & Vlado with "Ciao, amore".

== English version ==
"Julie", an English version of the song also recorded by Daniel, became a Top 10 hit in 1983 at the European singles charts in Austria, Belgium, Germany, Netherlands, Norway and Switzerland.

=== Weekly charts ===
Julie (English version)

Chart (1983)	Peak position
Austria (Ö3 Austria Top 40)	2
Belgium (Ultratop 50 Flanders)	2
Germany (Official German Charts)	13
Netherlands (Single Top 100)	3
Norway (VG-lista)	3
Switzerland (Schweizer Hitparade)	6

== Credits and personnel ==
- Daniel – music, guitar, vocals
- Mario Mihaljević – lyrics (original and English)
- Rajko Simunović – lyrics (English)
- Mato Došen – arranger, producer (Jugoton Records)
- Giorgio Osana – producer (Ariola Records)
