= Israel in the Eurovision Song Contest 1983 =

- Eurovision Song Contest 1983
- Participating broadcaster: Israel Broadcasting Authority (IBA)
- Country: Israel
- Selection process: Kdam Eurovision 1983
- Selection date: 5 March 1983

Competing entry
- Song: "Chai"
- Artist: Ofra Haza
- Songwriters: Avi Toledano; Ehud Manor

Placement
- Final result: 2nd, 136 points

Participation chronology

Israel was represented at the Eurovision Song Contest 1983 with the song "Chai", composed by Avi Toledano, with lyrics by Ehud Manor, and performed by Ofra Haza. The Israeli participating broadcaster, the Israel Broadcasting Authority (IBA), selected its entry for the contest through Kdam Eurovision 1983.

== Before Eurovision ==
=== Kdam Eurovision 1983 ===
The Israel Broadcasting Authority (IBA) held the national final on 5 March 1983 at the Jerusalem Theatre, co-hosted by Daniel Pe'er (who also co-hosted Eurovision 1979 in Jerusalem) and Dalia Mazor. One of the competitors was Pe'er's 1979 co-host Yardena Arazi, who also competed as a member of Chocolate, Menta, Mastik in the 1976 contest. Arazi finished second, as she had in the previous year's national selection, and would later claim that the votes were incorrectly tallied and she, not Haza, had actually earned the ticket to Munich. However, she did not want to appear to be a sore loser, and let Haza take the victory. Arazi would later compete once again in 1985 in 1985 (as Israel sat the 1984 contest out due to coinciding with Yom HaZikaron), finishing third, and would eventually be internally selected by the IBA in 1988, performing all the songs (including the eventual entry "Ben Adam"). The winner was chosen through several regional juries.

Final – 5 March 1983
R/O	Artist	Song	Points	Place
1	Kesem	"Ha'agada al Bel"	56	3
2	Gitit Shoval	"Beyti"	5	10
3	Ilana Avital	"Od va'od"	37	5
4	Osnat Vishinski	"Knafayim"	5	10
5	Isolir Band	"Kol mi"	34	6
6	Pnina Rosenblum	"Tamid isha"	2	13
7	Ofra Haza	"Chai"	73	1
8	Michal Tal	"Madu'a ze kashe"	3	12
9	Anat Rekem	"Ya lel ya lel"	30	7
10	Yaldey Ha'shemesh	"Holech ve shar"	29	8
11	Yardena Arazi	"Shiru shir Amen"	72	2
12	Riki Gal	"Panim"	12	9
13	Banana	"Madonna"	48	4

Detailed Regional Jury Votes
R/O	Song	Tel Aviv	Tiberias	Haifa	Yavne	Jerusalem	Degania Bet	Lod	Total
1	"Ha'agada al Bel"	10	8	10	10	8	7	3	56
2	"Beyti"	2	1	1			1		5
3	"Od va'od"	5	2	6	6	6	5	7	37
4	"Knafayim"		3	2					5
5	"Kol mi"	6	5	5	4	5	4	5	34
6	"Tamid isha"				1	1			2
7	"Chai"	12	10	7	12	12	8	12	73
8	"Madu'a ze kashe"				2			1	3
9	"Ya lel ya lel"	7	7		3	2	3	8	30
10	"Holech ve shar"	3	4	3	5	4	6	4	29
11	"Shiru shir Amen"	8	12	12	8	10	12	10	72
12	"Panim"	1		4		3	2	2	12
13	"Madonna"	4	6	8	7	7	10	6	48

== At Eurovision ==
Both Ofra Haza and conductor Nansi Silviu Brandes remarked that competing in Munich held a special significance to the Israeli delegation. 1983 marked eleven years from the Munich massacre, which saw the murder of 11 Israeli Olympic athletes by the Palestinian terrorist organization Black September during the 1972 Summer Olympics. Additionally, following a visit to the Dachau concentration camp, Haza noted what significance there would be to an Israeli song winning in Germany, particularly one with a message of "all of Israel [being] alive". British commentator Terry Wogan remarked prior to their performance that the song and Haza's vocals had been well-received in rehearsals, and that Israel was considered "a sleeper" to potentially win the contest.

Israel performed sixteenth on the night of the contest, following Denmark and preceding Portugal. Unlike the previous year, in which Avi Toledano's "Hora" coming second was still a fair distance behind winner Germany, "Chai" was in contention through most of the voting, with two countries (Austria and the Netherlands) awarding Israel a maximum 12 points. Indeed, nine countries had Israel in their top three (including ten points from Belgium, host country Germany, eventual winner Luxembourg, Portugal, the United Kingdom, and Yugoslavia; and eight points from France), all but two rated them five points or higher (Greece and Italy, who each awarded three points), and only two more (Cyprus and Turkey) failed to award Israel any points at all. Nevertheless, this proved to make all the difference, as by the end of the voting it left Israel with a total of 136 points, placing second, six points adrift of winning the contest.

It was the second consecutive silver finish for Israel, and, as was the case the year before, the Israeli jury awarded twelve points to the winning song, in this case Luxembourg's Corinne Hermes with "Si la vie est cadeau".

=== Voting ===
Points awarded to Israel
Score	Country
12 points	Austria; Netherlands
10 points	Belgium; Germany; Luxembourg; Portugal; United Kingdom; Yugoslavia
8 points	France
7 points	Denmark; Finland; Switzerland
6 points	Norway; Spain
5 points	Sweden
4 points	
3 points	Greece; Italy
2 points	
1 point	

Points awarded by Israel
Score	Country
12 points	Luxembourg
10 points	Yugoslavia
8 points	Sweden
7 points	Finland
6 points	Italy
5 points	Cyprus
4 points	Norway
3 points	Netherlands
2 points	Austria
1 point	France

== After Eurovision ==
Ofra Haza went on to have a successful international career following her Eurovision participation. 1984 saw the release of her album Yemenite Songs, a collection of Yemeni Jewish songs and poems recalling Haza's heritage. It included her version of Rabbi Shalom Shabazi's poem "Im Nin'alu", which was remixed by Izhar Ashdot in 1987 and became a major hit in Europe the year after. Her international debut album, Shaday (1988), wound up selling over a million copies worldwide.

Her 1992 album Kirya became the first Israeli album to be nominated for a Grammy, and in 1994 she performed at the Nobel Peace Prize Concert, an achievement she shares with a handful of fellow Eurovision contestants, including Secret Garden, Jan Werner Danielsen, Alexander Rybak, Il Volo, and Wenche Myhre. She provided the voice of Yocheved in 1998's The Prince of Egypt for eighteen different international versions. She died February 23 in 2000 from AIDS-related complications, but remains an influential and highly popular figure in Israel to this day.

As stated above, Israel did not participate in the 1984 contest due to a conflict with Yom HaZikaron. "Chai" was therefore succeeded as the Israeli entry by Izhar Cohen's "Olé, Olé" in 1985.
