= Germany in the Eurovision Song Contest 1983 =

- Eurovision Song Contest 1983
- Participating broadcaster: ARD (Note: Arbeitsgemeinschaft der öffentlich-rechtlichen Rundfunkanstalten der Bundesrepublik Deutschland) – Bayerischer Rundfunk (BR)
- Country: Germany
- Selection process: Ein Lied für München
- Selection date: 19 March 1983

Competing entry
- Song: "Rücksicht"
- Artist: Hoffmann & Hoffmann
- Songwriters: Michael Reinecke; Volker Lechtenbrink

Placement
- Final result: 5th, 94 points

Participation chronology

Germany was represented at the Eurovision Song Contest 1983 with the song "Rücksicht", composed by Michael Reinecke, with lyrics by Volker Lechtenbrink, and performed by duo Hoffmann & Hoffmann. The German participating broadcaster on behalf of ARD, Bayerischer Rundfunk (BR), selected their entry through a national final. In addition, BR was also the host broadcaster and staged the event at the Rudi-Sedlmayer-Halle in Munich, after winning the previous edition with the song "Ein bißchen Frieden" by Nicole.

== Before Eurovision ==
=== Ein Lied für München ===
Ein Lied für München was the national final that selected the German entry for the Eurovision Song Contest 1983. It was produced by Bayerischer Rundfunk (BR) and held in its Studio 4 in Unterföhring on 19 March 1983 at 20:15 CET. Rainer Bertram served as the director. The final was broadcast on Deutsches Fernsehen and in radio stations Bayern 1, Frankfurt 1, NDR 1, RIAS 1 and WDR 1. It was hosted by Carolin Reiber and Rudolf Rohlinger.

Twelve songs took part and the winner was chosen by a panel of 500 people who had been selected as providing a representative cross-section of the German public. Among the participants were former German representative Wencke Myhre (1968) and future entrant Ingrid Peters (1986).

Ein Lied für München – 19 March 1983
| R/O | Artist | Song | Songwriters | Votes | Place |
|---|---|---|---|---|---|
| 1 | Holger Thomas | "Mein Hit heißt Susi Schmidt" | Jean Frankfurter; Robert Jung | 2,609 | 10 |
| 2 | Veronika Fischer | "Unendlich weit" | Achim Oppermann; Christoph Busse | 2,523 | 11 |
| 3 | Hoffmann & Hoffmann | "Rücksicht" | Michael Reinecke; Volker Lechtenbrink | 4,251 | 1 |
| 4 | Angela Branca | "Warum hältst Du mich nicht fest?" | Alexander Gordan; Konrad Wolf | 3,222 | 8 |
| 5 | Bernd Clüver | "Mit 17" | Dieter Bohlen; René Marcardt | 3,933 | 3 |
| 6 | Ingrid Peters and July Paul | "Viva la Mamma" | Michael Hofmann; Werner Schüler | 3,983 | 2 |
| 7 | Peter Rubin | "Wie ein Mann" | Günther-Eric Thöner; Peter Rubin; Barbara Wittner | 3,427 | 6 |
| 8 | Wencke Myhre & Sohn Dani | "Wir beide gegen den Wind" | Achim Oppermann; Christoph Busse | 3,752 | 5 |
| 9 | Harry Belten | "Angelo" | Michael Zai; Theo Werdin | 2,111 | 12 |
| 10 | Leinemann | "Ich reiß' alle Mauern ein" | Hansi Goldfuß; Gerd Thumser | 3,314 | 7 |
| 11 | Mara | "Sternenland" | Joachim Heider; Norbert Hammerschmidt | 2,987 | 9 |
| 12 | Costa Cordalis | "Ich mag Dich" | Costa Cordalis; Jean Frankfurter | 3,902 | 4 |

== At Eurovision ==
The contest was broadcast on Deutsches Fernsehen and on radio stations Bayern 1, Frankfurt 1, NDR 2, and RIAS 1 with commentary by Ado Schlier. The show was watched by 13.57 million viewers in Germany.

On the night of the final Hoffmann & Hoffmann performed 14th in the running order, following Cyprus and preceding Denmark. At the close of voting "Rücksicht" had received 94 points, placing Germany 5th of the 20 entries, the country's fifth consecutive top 5 finish. The German jury awarded its 12 points to Sweden.

"Rücksicht" became the biggest domestic hit of Hoffmann & Hoffmann's career, reaching number 8 on the German singles chart. Already before the international final, the song had sold 150,000 copies.

=== Voting ===
The German jury consisted of 11 non-professional jurors.

Points awarded to Germany
| Score | Country |
|---|---|
| 12 points | Luxembourg |
| 10 points | France; Netherlands; Norway |
| 8 points | Portugal; Sweden |
| 7 points | Austria; United Kingdom |
| 6 points | Belgium; Italy |
| 5 points | |
| 4 points | Finland |
| 3 points | Denmark |
| 2 points | Switzerland |
| 1 point | Greece |

Points awarded by Germany
| Score | Country |
|---|---|
| 12 points | Sweden |
| 10 points | Israel |
| 8 points | Luxembourg |
| 7 points | Finland |
| 6 points | Yugoslavia |
| 5 points | Cyprus |
| 4 points | France |
| 3 points | United Kingdom |
| 2 points | Netherlands |
| 1 point | Norway |
