= Finland in the Eurovision Song Contest 1983 =

- Eurovision Song Contest 1983
- Participating broadcaster: Yleisradio (Yle)
- Country: Finland
- Selection process: National final
- Selection date: 28 January 1983

Competing entry
- Song: "Fantasiaa"
- Artist: Ami Aspelund
- Songwriters: Kari Kuusamo; Kaisu Liuhala

Placement
- Final result: 11th, 41 points

Participation chronology

Finland was represented at the Eurovision Song Contest 1983 with the song "Fantasiaa", composed by Kari Kuusamo, with lyrics by Kaisu Liuhala, and performed by Ami Aspelund. The Finnish participating broadcaster, Yleisradio (Yle), selected its entry through a national final.

== Before Eurovision ==
=== National final ===
Ten entries were selected for the competition from around 300 received submissions. The members of the selection jury were Harri Wessman, Kimmo Salminen, Raila Kinnunen, Markku Fagerlund, Heljä Kaste, Janne Riilas, Veijo Miettinen, Arto Vilkko, Risto Hiltunen, Ossi Runne, Erkki Pohjanheimo, and Heikki Seppälä. The composers got to choose between Ami Aspelund, Kirka, Meiju Suvas, Opus 5, and Tapani Kansa to perform their songs. Yleisradio (Yle) held the national final on 28 January 1983. at its studios in Helsinki, hosted by Maria Valkama. The winner was chosen by postcard voting that lasted two days. The results were announced on 11 February 1983.

Final – 28 January 1983
| R/O | Artist | Song | Songwriter(s) | Votes | Place |
|---|---|---|---|---|---|
| 1 | Kirka | "Täytyy uskaltaa" | Kisu Jernström; Kassu Halonen; Impi Riimi | 22,237 | 2 |
| 2 | Ami Aspelund and Opus 5 | "Hymni Äiti Teresalle" | Jaska Linkola | 2,306 | 10 |
| 3 | Tapani Kansa | "Kadonneen rakkauden unelma" | Jukka Koivisto; Chrisse Johansson | 19,247 | 3 |
| 4 | Kirka | "Kaksi vaan" | Olli Ahvenlahti; Asko Koskela | 3,057 | 8 |
| 5 | Ami Aspelund | "Fantasiaa" | Kari Kuusamo; Kaisu Liuhala | 44,131 | 1 |
| 6 | Opus 5 | "Muista mua musiikilla" | Markku Johansson; Juha Vainio | 3,474 | 6 |
| 7 | Tapani Kansa | "Kun kyynelilläni nuottini kastelen" | Markku Anttila; Jussi Asu | 12,205 | 4 |
| 8 | Meiju Suvas | "Laulujen laulu" | Aarno Raninen; Pertti Reponen | 3,101 | 7 |
| 9 | Kirka | "Tuhanteen aamuun laulun teen" | Jukka Siikavire; Jussi Tuominen | 8,703 | 5 |
| 10 | Meiju Suvas | "Rakastunut nainen" | Valto Laitinen; Raul Reiman | 2,401 | 9 |

== At Eurovision ==
On the night of the final Aspelund performed 9th in the running order, following Switzerland and preceding Greece. Aspelund was accompanied by Johnny Gustafsson, Pave Maijanen and Jokke Seppälä as backing vocalists, and Kari Kuusamo as a pianist and a backing vocalist. The costumes were designed by Satu-Marja Nygren, and the choreography was made by a dance group Jazz Girls. At the close of voting "Fantasiaa" had picked up 41 points, placing Finland joint 11th of the 20 entries, the country's highest finish since 1977. The Finnish jury awarded its 12 points to Yugoslavia.

=== Voting ===
Points awarded to Finland
| Score | Country |
|---|---|
| 12 points | |
| 10 points | |
| 8 points | Greece |
| 7 points | Germany; Israel |
| 6 points | United Kingdom |
| 5 points | |
| 4 points | Switzerland |
| 3 points | Turkey |
| 2 points | Austria; Norway |
| 1 point | France; Luxembourg |

Points awarded by Finland
| Score | Country |
|---|---|
| 12 points | Yugoslavia |
| 10 points | Sweden |
| 8 points | Luxembourg |
| 7 points | Israel |
| 6 points | France |
| 5 points | Greece |
| 4 points | Germany |
| 3 points | Netherlands |
| 2 points | Portugal |
| 1 point | Italy |
