= Austria in the Eurovision Song Contest 1983 =

- Eurovision Song Contest 1983
- Participating broadcaster: Österreichischer Rundfunk (ORF)
- Country: Austria
- Selection process: Aus zwölf wird eins
- Selection date: 17 March 1983

Competing entry
- Song: "Hurricane"
- Artist: Westend
- Songwriters: Peter Vieweger; Heli Deinboek; Heinz Nessizius

Placement
- Final result: 9th, 53 points

Participation chronology

Austria was represented at the Eurovision Song Contest 1983 with the song "Hurricane", composed by Peter Vieweger, with lyrics by Heli Deinboek and Heinz Nessizius, and performed by Westend. The Austrian participating broadcaster Österreichischer Rundfunk (ORF), selected its entry through a national final.

== Before Eurovision ==
=== Aus zwölf wird eins ===
Österreichischer Rundfunk (ORF) held the national final Aus zwölf wird eins ("From twelve to one") at its television studios in Vienna, hosted by Brigitte Xander. It took place on 17 March 1983 at 20:15 CET (19:15 UTC) and was broadcast on FS2. The winning song was chosen by 328 people aged between 16 and 60. Waterloo represented Austria in 1976 alongside Robinson.

Final – 17 March 1983
R/O	Artist	Song	Points	Place
1	Wallner and Licha	"Bleib doch hier"	461	8
2	Johannes Raimann	"Summa is"	193	12
3	Andreas Wörz	"Musik Musik"	252	10
4	Patrick Nes	"Ein Wort von dir"	625	5
5	Westend	"Hurricane"	1,238	1
6	G & E & ETW	"Hallo Welt"	572	6
7	The Hornettes	"Hello Mr. Radio"	817	3
8	Gary Lux	"Bleib wie du bist"	647	4
9	Ines Reiger and Do-Re-Mi	"Träume sind unser Leben"	559	7
10	Manuela Leeb	"Du bist mein Talisman"	408	9
11	The Duncan Sisters	"Heute nacht wird gelacht"	234	11
12	Waterloo	"Freiheit"	1,216	2

== At Eurovision ==
On the night of the final Westend performed 18th in the running order, following Portugal and preceding Belgium. At the close of voting "Hurricane" placing Austria 9th of the 20 entries. The Austrian jury awarded its 12 points to the runner-up, Ofra Haza from Israel.

=== Voting ===
Points awarded to Austria
Score	Country
12 points	
10 points	Turkey
8 points	
7 points	
6 points	Denmark
5 points	Italy; Portugal
4 points	Greece; Netherlands; Sweden; Yugoslavia
3 points	Belgium; Cyprus; United Kingdom
2 points	Israel
1 point	

Points awarded by Austria
Score	Country
12 points	Israel
10 points	United Kingdom
8 points	Sweden
7 points	Germany
6 points	Switzerland
5 points	Luxembourg
4 points	Netherlands
3 points	Norway
2 points	Finland
1 point	Yugoslavia
