= United Kingdom in the Eurovision Song Contest 1983 =

- Eurovision Song Contest 1983
- Participating broadcaster: British Broadcasting Corporation (BBC)
- Country: United Kingdom
- Selection process: A Song for Europe 1983
- Selection date: 24 March 1983

Competing entry
- Song: "I'm Never Giving Up"
- Artist: Sweet Dreams
- Songwriters: Ron Roker; Phil Wigger; Jan Pulsford

Placement
- Final result: 6th, 79 points

Participation chronology

The United Kingdom was represented at the Eurovision Song Contest 1983 with the song "I'm Never Giving Up", written by Ron Roker, Phil Wigger, and Jan Pulsford, and performed by the band Sweet Dreams. The British participating broadcaster, the British Broadcasting Corporation (BBC), selected its entry through a national final.

== Before Eurovision ==
The BBC initially approached Bonnie Tyler to represent the UK at the contest, but the offer was turned down.

=== A Song for Europe 1983 ===
The British Broadcasting Corporation (BBC) used once again the television show A Song for Europe to select its entry, as it had since its debut at the contest in 1957.

==== Competing entries ====
About 445 entries were submitted for the national final. Of the entries, songwriters Tony Hiller, Martin Lee and Paul Curtis had had songs in the Eurovision final before. Stephanie De Sykes and Stuart Slater had twice won the A Song for Europe contest previously, in both 1978 and 1980. Songwriter Marty Kristian had competed with the New Seekers in 1972. His group featured former New Seekers singer Kathy Ann Rae and former entrant Lance Aston (of Prima Donna). "When the Kissing Stops", written by Martin Lee and Barry Upton of Brotherhood of Man together with their longtime writing partner Tony Hiller (who had co-written "Save Your Kisses For Me" with Lee), was originally intended for the group themselves, but they decided it would be best not to risk losing and thus not to take part; although all four members of the group attended the broadcast. The group did go on to record the song however and it featured on their album Lightning Flash. The writers of "Keeping Our Love Alive", Doug Flett and Guy Fletcher had written many previous British finalists, including the 1973 winner "Power to All Our Friends". The group Casablanca were short lived, but the three main artists, Des Dyer, Samantha Spencer-Lane and Carla Donnelly all featured in other editions of the British final.

==== Final ====
The final was held on 24 March 1983 at the BBC Television Theatre in London, and was hosted by Terry Wogan. The BBC Concert Orchestra under the direction of John Coleman as conductor accompanied all the songs, but all the music was pre-recorded. Prior to the voting, a dance and song montage filmed at the Royal Mint was played featuring the song "Money (That's What I Want)". The votes of eight regional juries based in Cardiff, Belfast, Norwich, Glasgow, Bristol, Birmingham, Manchester and London decided the winner. Each jury region awarded 15 points to their favourite song, 12 points to the second, 10 points to the third and then 9, 8, 7, 6 and 5 points in order of preference for the songs from 4th to 8th.

A Song for Europe 1983 – 24 March 1983
R/O	Artist	Song	Songwriter(s)	Points	Place
1	Sweet Dreams	"I'm Never Giving Up"	Ron Roker; Phil Wigger; Jan Pulsford	109	1
2	Sam Childs	"I'm Going Home"	Geoff Stephens; Graham Preskett	50	8
3	Stuart Slater	"All Around the World"	Stephanie De Sykes; Stuart Slater	63	5
4	Casablanca	"With Love"	Des Dyer; Clive Scott	72	3
5	Mirror	"We've Got All the Time in the World"	Tony Hiller; Paul Curtis	91	2
6	Audio	"Love on Your Mind"	Marty Kristian; Trevor Spencer	68	4
7	Rubic	"When the Kissing Stops"	Tony Hiller; Martin Lee; Barry Upton	63	5
8	Ritzy	"Keeping Our Love Alive"	Guy Fletcher; Doug Flett	60	7

Detailed Jury Votes
R/O	Song	Cardiff	Belfast	Norwich	Glasgow	Bristol	Birmingham	Manchester	London	Total
1	"I'm Never Giving Up"	15	12	15	15	15	15	10	12	109
2	"I'm Going Home"	10	5	6	8	5	5	5	6	50
3	"All Around the World"	6	7	12	9	10	6	6	7	63
4	"With Love"	5	10	10	5	8	12	7	15	72
5	"We've Got All the Time in the World"	12	15	8	12	12	7	15	10	91
6	"Love on Your Mind"	8	9	5	10	6	9	12	9	68
7	"When the Kissing Stops"	9	8	7	6	7	10	8	8	63
8	"Keeping Our Love Alive"	7	6	9	7	9	8	9	5	60
Jury Spokespersons
Cardiff – Iwan Thomas; Belfast – David Olver; Norwich – Ian Masters; Glasgow – Ken Bruce; Bristol – Andy Batten-Foster; Birmingham – Marjorie Lofthouse; Manchester – John Mundy; London – Colin Berry

== At Eurovision ==
After Bardo's "One Step Further" in the Eurovision Song Contest 1982, the United Kingdom placed one spot better at sixth place, scoring 79 points, with "I'm Never Giving Up" by Sweet Dreams.

The contest was broadcast on BBC1 (with commentary by Terry Wogan). Wogan also provided commentary to viewers in Ireland (RTÉ 1) and Australia (Channel 0/28).

Due to the contest being held on St. George's Day, BBC Radio 2 opted not to broadcast the contest as they had already made plans to broadcast The St. George's Day Concert held at the same time. Colin Berry returned as spokesperson for the UK jury.

=== Voting ===
Points awarded to the United Kingdom
Score	Country
12 points	Sweden
10 points	Austria
8 points	Switzerland
7 points	
6 points	Cyprus; Luxembourg
5 points	Denmark; France; Greece; Netherlands; Norway; Turkey
4 points	
3 points	Germany
2 points	Italy; Portugal
1 point	

Points awarded by the United Kingdom
Score	Country
12 points	Yugoslavia
10 points	Israel
8 points	Sweden
7 points	Germany
6 points	Finland
5 points	Norway
4 points	Belgium
3 points	Austria
2 points	Denmark
1 point	Netherlands
