= Portugal in the Eurovision Song Contest 1983 =

- Eurovision Song Contest 1983
- Participating broadcaster: Radiotelevisão Portuguesa (RTP)
- Country: Portugal
- Selection process: Festival RTP da Canção 1983
- Selection date: 5 March 1983

Competing entry
- Song: "Esta balada que te dou"
- Artist: Armando Gama
- Songwriter: Armando Gama

Placement
- Final result: 13th, 33 points

Participation chronology

Portugal was represented at the Eurovision Song Contest 1983 with the song "Esta balada que te dou", written and performed by Armando Gama. The Portuguese participating broadcaster, Radiotelevisão Portuguesa (RTP), selected its entry at the Festival RTP da Canção 1983.

== Before Eurovision ==
=== Festival RTP da Canção 1983 ===
Radiotelevisão Portuguesa (RTP) held the Festival RTP da Canção 1983 at the Coliseu do Porto in Porto on 5 March 1983, hosted by Valentina Torres and Eládio Clímaco. The winning song was chosen by the votes of 22 regional juries.

Armando Gama previously took part in the 1980 Portuguese semi-finals with the group Sarabanda. Carlos Paião had represented Portugal in Eurovision in 1981.

Final – 5 March 1983
R/O	Artist	Song	Points	Place
1	Sofia	"Erva ruim"	52	9
2	Sofia	"Terra desmedida"	80	8
3	Ana	"Parabéns, parabéns a você"	99	6
4	Armando Gama	"Esta balada que te dou"	232	1
5	Cândida Branca Flor and Carlos Paião	"Vinho do Porto (Vinho de Portugal)"	148	4
6	Xico Jorge	"Mal d'amores"	27	11
7	Herman José	"A cor do teu baton"	209	2
8	Jorge Fernando	"Rosas brancas para o meu amor"	86	7
9	Helena Isabel	"E afinal quem és tu?"	149	3
10	Broa de Mel	"No calor da noite"	45	10
11	Tessa	"Ave do paraíso"	6	12
12	Alexandra	"Rosa flor mulher"	143	5

== At Eurovision ==
On the night of the final Gama performed 17th in the running order, following Israel and preceding Austria. At the close of voting "Esta balada que te dou" placing Portugal 13th of the 20 entries. The Portuguese jury awarded its 12 points to the winner song from Luxembourg.

=== Voting ===
Points awarded to Portugal
Score	Country
12 points	
10 points	
8 points	
7 points	Luxembourg
6 points	Netherlands; Switzerland
5 points	Spain
4 points	France
3 points	
2 points	Finland; Yugoslavia
1 point	Sweden

Points awarded by Portugal
Score	Country
12 points	Luxembourg
10 points	Israel
8 points	Germany
7 points	Italy
6 points	Norway
5 points	Austria
4 points	Sweden
3 points	France
2 points	United Kingdom
1 point	Belgium
