= I'm Never Giving Up =

1983 single by Sweet Dreams

Single by Sweet Dreams
- B-side: "Two Way Mirror"
- Released: March 1983
- Genre: Pop
- Length: 3.00
- Label: Arista Records
- Composers: Ron Roker; Phil Wigger
- Lyricists: Ron Roker; Jan Pulsford; Phil Wigger

Eurovision Song Contest 1983 entry
- Country: United Kingdom
- Artists: Bobby McVay; Carrie Gray; Helen Kray
- As: Sweet Dreams
- Language: English
- Composers: Ron Roker; Phil Wigger
- Lyricists: Ron Roker; Jan Pulsford; Phil Wigger
- Conductor: John Coleman

Finals performance
- Final result: 6th
- Final points: 79

Entry chronology
- ◄ "One Step Further" (1982)
- "Love Games" (1984) ►

"I'm Never Giving Up", written and composed by Ron Roker, Jan Pulsford, and Phil Wigger, was the United Kingdom's entry at the Eurovision Song Contest 1983, performed by the trio Sweet Dreams.

Sweet Dreams won the right to perform at Munich by winning the UK national final, A Song for Europe, where they were the first act to perform. In Munich, the song was performed third on the night, after Norway's Jahn Teigen with "Do Re Mi", and before Sweden's Carola Häggkvist with "Främling". At the end of judging that evening, "I'm Never Giving Up" took the sixth-place slot with 79 points. Sweden awarded the UK its only 12 points of the night.

The song was sung up-tempo and related to the story of the singers "never giving up" in their quest to win back their lover, and restoring their love "the way it was before". The trio was dressed in exercise gear, with McVay colour-coordinated in blue, and Gray and Kray in red and yellow accessories, respectively. Also unique that year was their use of stools as props, sliding off them at one point to signify a key change in the melody.

After Eurovision, the song was placed at No. 21 on the UK Singles Chart during an eight-week run. It would become Sweet Dreams' only hit before they disbanded at the end of 1983.

== Charts ==
Chart performance for "I'm Never Giving Up"
Chart (1983)	Peak position
Ireland (IRMA)	25
UK Singles (OCC)	21
