= Yugoslavia in the Eurovision Song Contest 1983 =

- Eurovision Song Contest 1983
- Participating broadcaster: Jugoslavenska radiotelevizija (JRT)
- Country: Yugoslavia
- Selection process: Jugovizija 1983
- Selection date: 4 March 1983

Competing entry
- Song: "Džuli"
- Artist: Danijel
- Songwriters: Danijel Popović; Mario Mihaljević

Placement
- Final result: 4th, 125 points

Participation chronology

Yugoslavia was represented at the Eurovision Song Contest 1983 with the song "Džuli", composed by Danijel Popović, with lyrics by Mario Mihaljević, and performed by Danijel himself. The Yugoslav participating broadcaster, Jugoslavenska radiotelevizija (JRT), selected its entry through Jugovizija 1983.

== Before Eurovision ==
=== Jugovizija 1983 ===
Jugovizija 1983 took place on 4 March 1983 at the Studio M in Novi Sad, hosted by Vesna Momirov and Tomislav Dražić. Each of the eight Jugoslavenska radiotelevizija (JRT) participating sub-national broadcasters (RTV Sarajevo, RTV Skopje, RTV Novi Sad, RTV Titograd, RTV Zagreb, RTV Belgrade, RTV Ljubljana, and RTV Pristina) entered two songs to Jugovizija, making a national final of sixteen songs. The winner was decided by the votes of the regional juries of the eight broadcasters, which could not vote for their own entries.

The winner was "Džuli" representing RTV Titograd, written by Danijel Popović and Mario Mihaljević, and performed by Danijel himself.

R/O	Broadcaster	Artist	Song	Points	Place
1	(Socialist Republic of Serbia) RTV Novi Sad	Milorad Nonin	"Sviraj za Mariju"	31	8
2	(Socialist Republic of Montenegro) RTV Titograd	Brano Mališić	"Vrati se"	18	11
3	(Socialist Republic of Serbia) RTV Novi Sad	Sunčeve pege	"Ti si nemoguć"	24	9
4	(Socialist Republic of Croatia) RTV Zagreb	Mišo Kovač	"Posadi cvijet"	22	10
5	(Socialist Republic of Slovenia) RTV Ljubljana	Marijan Smode	"Adrijana"	44	4
6	(Socialist Republic of Macedonia) RTV Skopje	Silva Delovska and Kim	"Opera"	12	13
7	(Socialist Republic of Serbia) RTV Belgrade	Lepa Brena and Slatki Greh	"Sitnije, Cile, sitnije"	34	7
8	(Socialist Republic of Slovenia) RTV Ljubljana	Hazard	"Najlepše pesmi"	9	14
9	(Socialist Republic of Bosnia and Herzegovina) RTV Sarajevo	COD	"Dođi da me vidiš"	16	12
10	(Socialist Republic of Serbia) RTV Pristina	Shpresa Gashi and Sabri Fejzullahu	"Fjala bëhet zog, dielli bëhet sy"	3	15
11	(Socialist Republic of Macedonia) RTV Skopje	Maja Odžaklievska	"Lidu lidu du"	46	3
12	(Socialist Republic of Serbia) RTV Pristina	Milica Milisavljević Dugalić and Gazmend Pallaska	"Dashuria në lulezim"	3	15
13	(Socialist Republic of Serbia) RTV Belgrade	Bebi Dol	"Rudi"	36	6
14	(Socialist Republic of Bosnia and Herzegovina) RTV Sarajevo	Indexi	"Na svoj način"	40	5
15	(Socialist Republic of Croatia) RTV Zagreb	Novi fosili	"Volim te od 9 do 2"	54	2
16	(Socialist Republic of Montenegro) RTV Titograd	Danijel	"Džuli"	72	1

== At Eurovision ==
The contest was broadcast on TV Beograd 1, TV Novi Sad, TV Prishtina, and TV Zagreb 1, all with commentary by Oliver Mlakar, as well as on TV Ljubljana 1.

On the night of contest Yugoslavia performed 12th, following Netherlands and preceding Cyprus. At the close of voting "Džuli" had received 125 points, placing 4th out of 20 competing countries, which was Yugoslavia's joint-best placing at the contest, sharing with 1962 Yugoslav entry "Ne pali svetla u sumrak" by Lola Novaković, and would remain so until their victory in 1989. The Yugoslav jury awarded its 12 points to contest winners Luxembourg.

=== Voting ===
Points awarded to Yugoslavia
Score	Country
12 points	Belgium; Denmark; Finland; Turkey; United Kingdom
10 points	Israel; Spain
8 points	Cyprus; Luxembourg; Norway
7 points	Netherlands
6 points	Germany; Greece
5 points	
4 points	
3 points	
2 points	
1 point	Austria; Italy

Points awarded by Yugoslavia
Score	Country
12 points	Luxembourg
10 points	Israel
8 points	Italy
7 points	Switzerland
6 points	Cyprus
5 points	Netherlands
4 points	Austria
3 points	France
2 points	Portugal
1 point	Sweden
