= Spain in the Eurovision Song Contest 1983 =

- Eurovision Song Contest 1983
- Participating broadcaster: Televisión Española (TVE)
- Country: Spain
- Selection process: Internal selection
- Announcement date: 1 March 1983

Competing entry
- Song: "¿Quién maneja mi barca?"
- Artist: Remedios Amaya
- Songwriters: José Miguel Évoras; Isidro Muñoz

Placement
- Final result: 19th, 0 points

Participation chronology

Spain was represented at the Eurovision Song Contest 1983 with the song "¿Quién maneja mi barca?", composed by José Miguel Évoras, with lyrics by Isidro Muñoz, and performed by Remedios Amaya. The Spanish participating broadcaster, Televisión Española (TVE), internally selected its entry for the contest. The song, performed in position 7, placed nineteenth –tying for last place with the song from Turkey– out of twenty competing entries with 0 points.

== Before Eurovision ==
Televisión Española (TVE) internally selected "¿Quién maneja mi barca?" performed by Remedios Amaya as its entry for the Eurovision Song Contest 1983. The song was composed by José Miguel Évoras, and had lyrics by Isidro Muñoz. TVE announced the song, songwriters, and performer on 1 March 1983.

== At Eurovision ==
On 23 April 1983, the Eurovision Song Contest was held at the Rudi-Sedlmayer-Halle in Munich hosted by Bayerischer Rundfunk (BR) on behalf of ARD and broadcast live throughout the continent. Amaya performed "¿Quién maneja mi barca?" 7th on the evening, following Turkey and preceding Switzerland. Since during rehearsals the organizers realized that the dress Tony Benítez had designed for her was not suitable for the stage, she had to wear the dress used in the video clip, and since she did not have matching shoes, she performed barefoot. José Miguel Évoras conducted the event's orchestra performance of the Spanish entry. At the close of voting "¿Quién maneja mi barca?" had received nul points placing in 19th place, last place tied with Turkey.

TVE broadcast the contest in Spain on TVE 1 with commentary by José-Miguel Ullán. Before the event, TVE aired a talk show hosted by Cristina García Ramos introducing the Spanish jury, which continued after the contest commenting on the results.

=== Voting ===
TVE assembled a jury panel with eleven members. The following members comprised the Spanish jury:

- María del Carmen Campos – administrative assistant
- Luis Fernando Reyes – economist
- Paloma Pérez – stewardess
- Bautista Serra – industrialist
- María Rosario Cano – student
- Marcial Pereira – student
- Gloria Moro – housewife
- Virginia Mataix – actress
- Abelardo Cano Santano – teacher
- Antonio Hipólito Romero – taxi driver
- Antonio Prieto – runner

The jury was chaired by Enrique Nicanor, with Rosa Campano as spokesperson. Francisco Javier Alfaro was the notary public. These did not have the right to vote, but the president decided in the event of a tie. The jury awarded its maximum of 12 points to Greece. Spain did not receive any points.

Points awarded by Spain
Score	Country
12 points	Greece
10 points	Yugoslavia
8 points	Belgium
7 points	Luxembourg
6 points	Israel
5 points	Portugal
4 points	Denmark
3 points	Italy
2 points	Sweden
1 point	Switzerland
