= Netherlands in the Eurovision Song Contest 1983 =

- Eurovision Song Contest 1983
- Participating broadcaster: Nederlandse Omroep Stichting (NOS)
- Country: Netherlands
- Selection process: Nationaal Songfestival 1983
- Selection date: 23 February 1983

Competing entry
- Song: "Sing Me a Song"
- Artist: Bernadette
- Songwriters: Piet Souer; Martin Duiser

Placement
- Final result: 7th, 66 points

Participation chronology

The Netherlands was represented at the Eurovision Song Contest 1983 with the song "Sing Me a Song", composed by Piet Souer, with lyrics by Martin Duiser, and performed by Bernadette. The Dutch participating broadcaster, Nederlandse Omroep Stichting (NOS), selected its entry through a national final.

== Before Eurovision ==
=== Nationaal Songfestival 1983 ===
Nederlandse Omroep Stichting (NOS) held the national final at the Congresgebouw in The Hague, hosted by Ivo Niehe. Five acts took part performing two songs each and voting was by 12 regional juries, who each had 30 points to divide between the songs. "Sing Me a Song" emerged the unexpected winner by a margin of just 1 point over the pre-final favourite "Een beetje van dit" by Vulcano, largely thanks to the South Holland jury awarding 19 of its 30 points to the song.

Final – 23 February 1983
R/O	Artist	Song	Points	Place
1	Mystique	"Rendez-vous"	25	8
2	Vulcano	"Met jou d'rbij"	27	5
3	Bernadette	"Soms"	26	6
4	Deuce	"Computer Games"	26	6
5	Music Hall	"Stop die show"	54	3
6	Mystique	"Op zo'n dag"	8	10
7	Bernadette	"Sing Me a Song"	69	1
8	Vulcano	"Een beetje van dit"	68	2
9	Deuce	"Stopwatch"	20	9
10	Music Hall	"Voulez-vous danser"	37	4

== At Eurovision ==
On the night of the final Bernadette performed 11th in the running order, following Greece and preceding Yugoslavia. At the close of voting "Sing Me a Song" had received 66 points, placing the Netherlands 7th of the 20 entries. The Dutch jury awarded its 12 points to Israel.

The Dutch conductor at the contest was Piet Souer.

=== Voting ===
Points awarded to the Netherlands
Score	Country
12 points	Switzerland
10 points	
8 points	
7 points	Norway
6 points	Sweden
5 points	Cyprus; Yugoslavia
4 points	Austria; Denmark; Italy; Luxembourg
3 points	Finland; Israel
2 points	Belgium; France; Germany; Turkey
1 point	United Kingdom

Points awarded by the Netherlands
Score	Country
12 points	Israel
10 points	Germany
8 points	Norway
7 points	Yugoslavia
6 points	Portugal
5 points	United Kingdom
4 points	Austria
3 points	Sweden
2 points	France
1 point	Luxembourg
