= Cyprus in the Eurovision Song Contest 1983 =

- Eurovision Song Contest 1983
- Participating broadcaster: Cyprus Broadcasting Corporation (CyBC)
- Country: Cyprus
- Selection process: Internal selection
- Announcement date: 23 February 1983

Competing entry
- Song: "I agapi akoma zi"
- Artist: Stavros and Constantina
- Songwriter: Stavros Sideras

Placement
- Final result: 16th, 26 points

Participation chronology

Cyprus was represented at the Eurovision Song Contest 1983 with the song "I agapi akoma zi", written by Stavros Sideras, and performed by Stavros and Constantina. The Cypriot participating broadcaster, the Cyprus Broadcasting Corporation (CyBC), internally selected its entry for the contest.

== Before Eurovision ==
=== Internal selection ===
The Cyprus Broadcasting Corporation (CyBC) opened a submission period for Cypriot artists and composers to submit songs from 16 November 1982 until 22 January 1983. Each artist or composer were only allowed to submit up to two entries each. By the end of the submission period, CyBC had received 22 entries. The internal selection took place on 23 February 1983 and the results were decided by an 11-member jury.

Stavros Siders was the sole singer on the recording of "I agapi akoma zi" which participated in the internal selection. However, the song was later changed to be a duet together with singer Dina Constantina.

Internal selection - 23 February 1983
Artist	Song	Songwriter(s)	Place
Stavros Sideras	"I agapi akoma zi" (Η αγάπη ακόμα ζει)	Stavros Sideras	1
	"Vrochi kai Kyriaki" (Βροχή και Κυριακή)		2

== At Eurovision ==
On the night of the final Stavros and Constantina performed thirteenth in the running order, following Yugoslavia and preceding Germany. At the close of voting "I agapi akoma zi" had received 26 points, placing Cyprus in 16th of the 20 participating countries. The Cypriot jury awarded its 12 points to Greece.

=== Voting ===
Points awarded to Cyprus
Score	Country
12 points	
10 points	
8 points	
7 points	
6 points	Yugoslavia
5 points	Germany; Israel
4 points	Belgium; Norway
3 points	
2 points	
1 point	Denmark; Switzerland

Points awarded by Cyprus
Score	Country
12 points	Greece
10 points	Luxembourg
8 points	Yugoslavia
7 points	Sweden
6 points	United Kingdom
5 points	Netherlands
4 points	France
3 points	Austria
2 points	Denmark
1 point	Italy
