= Eurovision Song Contest 1983 =

International song competition

Date and venue
- Final: 23 April 1983
- Venue: Rudi-Sedlmayer-Halle; Munich, West Germany

Organisation
- Organiser: European Broadcasting Union (EBU)
- Scrutineer: Frank Naef

Production
- Host broadcaster: ARD (Note: Arbeitsgemeinschaft der öffentlich-rechtlichen Rundfunkanstalten der Bundesrepublik Deutschland – "Working group of public broadcasters of the Federal Republic of Germany") – Bayerischer Rundfunk (BR)
- Director: Rainer Bertram
- Executive producers: Christian Hayer; Günther Lebram
- Musical director: Dieter Reith
- Presenter: Marlene Charell

Participants
- Number of entries: 20
- Returning countries: France; Greece; Italy
- Non-returning countries: Ireland
- Participation map: Competing countries Countries that participated in the past but not in 1983

Vote
- Voting system: Each country awarded 12, 10, 8-1 point(s) to their 10 favourite songs
- Winning song: Luxembourg "Si la vie est cadeau"

The Eurovision Song Contest 1983 was the 28th edition of the Eurovision Song Contest, held on 23 April 1983 at the Rudi-Sedlmayer-Halle in Munich, West Germany, and presented by Marlene Charell. It was organised by the European Broadcasting Union (EBU) and host broadcaster Bayerischer Rundfunk (BR) on behalf of ARD, who staged the event after winning the 1982 contest for Germany with the song "Ein bißchen Frieden" by Nicole. Despite being that their first win at the contest, it was actually the second time that ARD had hosted the competition, having previously done so in 1957 in Frankfurt.

Broadcasters from twenty countries participated in the contest, with France, Greece, and Italy all returning this year. Radio Telefís Éireann (RTÉ) decided not to participate citing industrial action, making this Ireland's first absence since its debut in 1965.

The winner was Luxembourg with the song "Si la vie est cadeau" by Corinne Hermes, which equalled the record of five victories set by France in 1977. This record would in turn be beaten by Ireland in 1994. It was also the second year in a row where the winning entry was performed last on the night and the second year in a row in which Israel won 2nd place. For the third year in a row at least one country ended up with nul points, in this case Spain and Turkey.

The 1983 contest was the first to be televised in Australia, via Channel 0/28 (now SBS) in Sydney and Melbourne. The contest went on to become popular in Australia, leading to their eventual debut at the 60th anniversary contest in 2015.

== Location ==
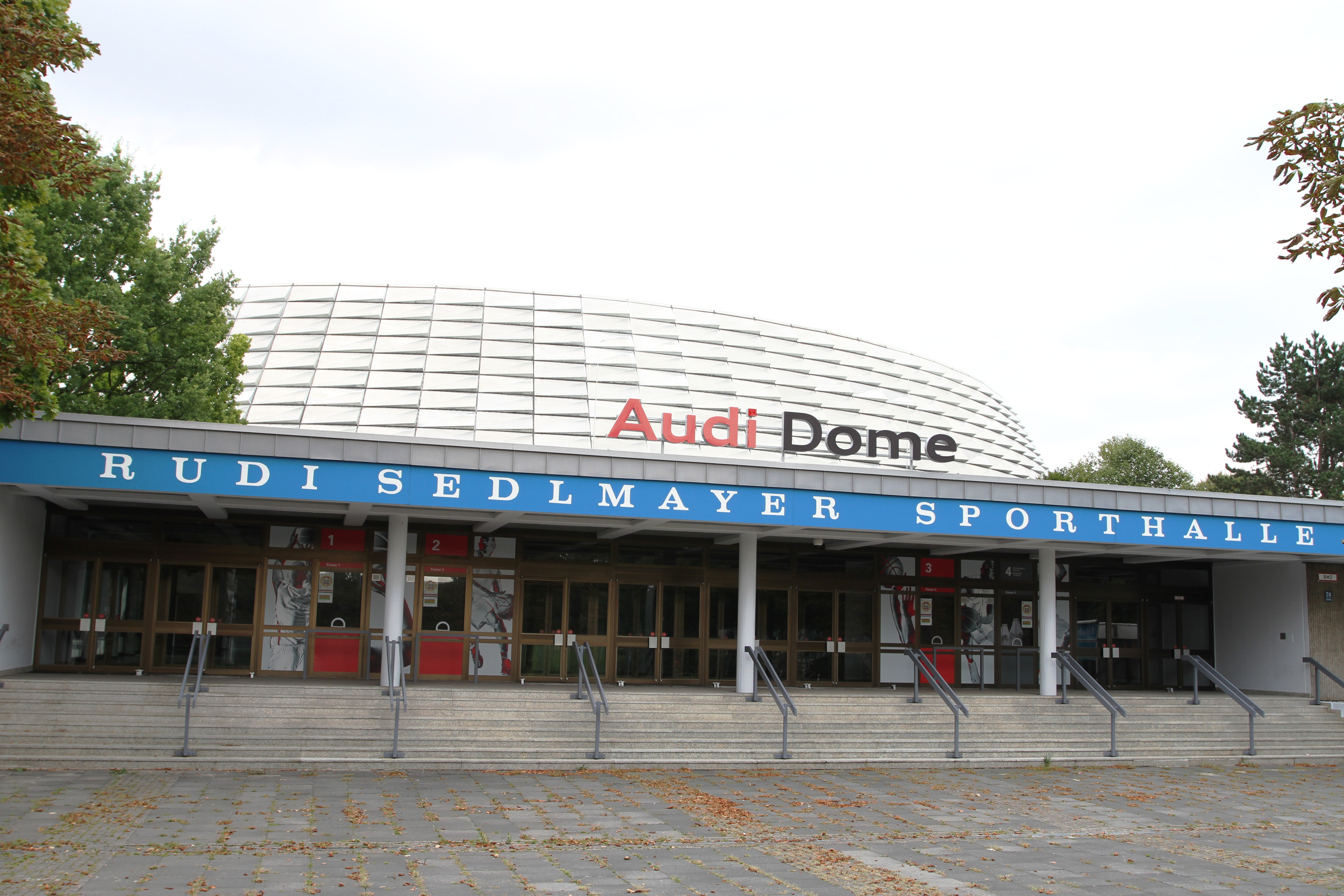
Rudi-Sedlmayer-Halle, Munich – host venue of the 1983 contest.

Munich is a German city and capital of the Bavarian state. Rudi-Sedlmayer-Halle was chosen to host the contest. The hall opened in 1972 to host basketball events for the 1972 Summer Olympics. Due to staging and production necessities, the 5,500 seats of the arena had to be reduced to 3,200 for the night of the final and until the 1985 contest, this was the largest arena to host the event. From this number, 2,000 seats were reserved for the delegations and journalists, and 1,200 tickets were on sale for the general public. The ticket prices ranged from 20 to 50 DM.

== Participants ==
Twenty countries took part in the contest, with France, Greece, and Italy returning to the competition. On the other hand, Ireland was absent this year for the first time since its debut in 1965 because of the financial difficulties of the national broadcaster, Radio Telefís Éireann (RTÉ).

Several of the performing artists had previously competed as lead artists representing the same country in past editions: Guy Bonnet had represented France in 1970; and Jahn Teigen had represented Norway in 1978, and in 1982 along Anita Skorgan. In addition, Sandra Reemer, who had represented the Netherlands in 1972 along with Andres Holten, in 1976, and in 1979; Anita Skorgan who represented Norway in 1977, in 1979, in 1982 along Jahn Teigen, and provided backing vocals in 1981; and Izolda Barudžija, who represented Yugoslavia in 1982 as part of Aska; provided backing vocals for the same country in this contest.

Eurovision Song Contest 1983 participants
Country	Broadcaster	Artist	Song	Language	Songwriter(s)	Conductor
Austria	ORF	Westend	"Hurricane"	German	Heli Deinboek; Heinz Nessizius; Peter Vieweger	Richard Oesterreicher
Belgium	BRT	Pas de Deux	"Rendez-vous"	Dutch	Paul Peyskens; Walter Verdin	Freddy Sunder
Cyprus	CyBC	Stavros and Constantina	"I agapi akoma zi" (Η αγάπη ακόμα ζει)	Greek	Stavros Sideras	Michalis Rozakis
Denmark	DR	Gry Johansen	"Kloden drejer"	Danish	Lars Christensen; Flemming Gernyx; Christian Jacobsen	Allan Botschinsky
Finland	YLE	Ami Aspelund	"Fantasiaa"	Finnish	Kari Kuusamo; Kaisu Liuhala	Ossi Runne
France	Antenne 2	Guy Bonnet	"Vivre"	French	Guy Bonnet; Fulbert Cant	François Rauber
Germany	BR (Note: On behalf of the German public broadcasting consortium ARD)	Hoffmann and Hoffmann	"Rücksicht"	German	Volker Lechtenbrink; Michael Reinecke	Dieter Reith
Greece	ERT	Christie	"Mou les" (Μου λες)	Greek	Sophia Fildissi; Antonis Plessas	Mimis Plessas
Israel	IBA	Ofra Haza	"Chai" (חי)	Hebrew	Ehud Manor; Avi Toledano	Silvio Nanssi Brandes
Italy	RAI	Riccardo Fogli	"Per Lucia"	Italian	Maurizio Fabrizio; Riccardo Fogli; Vincenzo Spampinato	Maurizio Fabrizio
Luxembourg	CLT	Corinne Hermès	"Si la vie est cadeau"	French	Alain Garcia; Jean-Pierre Millers	Michel Bernholc
Netherlands	NOS	Bernadette	"Sing Me a Song"	Dutch	Martin Duiser; Piet Souer	Piet Souer
Norway	NRK	Jahn Teigen	"Do Re Mi"	Norwegian	Herodes Falsk; Anita Skorgan; Jahn Teigen	Sigurd Jansen
Portugal	RTP	Armando Gama	"Esta balada que te dou"	Portuguese	Armando Gama	Mike Sergeant
Spain	TVE	Remedios Amaya	"Quién maneja mi barca"	Spanish	José Miguel Évoras; Isidro Muñoz	José Miguel Évoras
Sweden	SVT	Carola Häggkvist	"Främling"	Swedish	Monica Forsberg; Lasse Holm	Anders Ekdahl
Switzerland	SRG SSR	Mariella Farré	"Io così non ci sto"	Italian	Thomas Gonzenbach; Remo Kessler; Nella Martinetti	Robert Weber
Turkey	TRT	Çetin Alp and the Short Wave	"Opera"	Turkish	Aysel Gürel; Buğra Uğur	Buğra Uğur
United Kingdom	BBC	Sweet Dreams	"I'm Never Giving Up"	English	Jan Pulsford; Ron Roker; Phil Wigger	John Coleman
Yugoslavia	JRT	Daniel	"Džuli" (Џули)	Serbo-Croatian	Mario Mihaljević; Danijel Popović	Radovan Papović

Eurovision Song Contest 1983 – Participation summaries by country
- Austria; Belgium; Cyprus; Denmark; Finland; France; Germany; Greece; Israel; Italy; Luxembourg; Netherlands; Norway; Portugal; Spain; Sweden; Switzerland; Turkey; United Kingdom; Yugoslavia

== Production ==
The local production of the contest started in June 1982. The final was produced by Bayerischer Rundfunk (BR) on behalf of ARD, with production costs of 1.2 million DM, further 1.5 million DM for the organisation and broadcaster, making a total of 2.7 million DM. With the help of donations and other contributions, Bayerischer Rundfunk was able to reduce the costs at its own expense to about 1 million DM. The city of Munich had to contribute 60,000 DM to a reception for the participating delegations.

The contest was directed by Rainer Bertram. Dieter Reith served as the general musical director of the 60-piece orchestra. Christian Hayer and Günther Lebram served as the executive producers. Other leading figures in the production included Wolf Mittler, Sylvia de Bruycker, Christof Schmid and Joachim Krausz. Rehearsals started on 18 April 1983.

=== Stage design ===
The stage was designed by Hans Gailling. The set was an arc-shaped stage surrounding the orchestra section and had a size of 4 by 34 metres (13 ft × 112 ft). A 26 metres (85 ft) large and 7 metres (23 ft) high steel construction with frames resembling giant electric heaters was used as the background. The 33 frames were equipped with three light panels each, at which hundreds of light bulbs were suspended. In total, 63,000 light bulbs, which could be controlled manually or by sound frequency, lit up and flashed in different sequences and combinations depending on the nature and rhythm of the songs.

== Format ==
Various receptions and events were organised in the week leading up to the final. On 19 April 1983, a cruise on Lake Starnberg with several participants was held by the German National Tourist Board as a press event for 250 journalists. The Tourist Board also organised a bus tour for several participants to Linderhof Palace and Garmisch-Partenkirchen on 20 April 1983. On 19 April 1983, a reception for the participants was held at the Antiquarium in the Munich Residenz, on behalf of Franz Josef Strauss, minister-president of the state of Bavaria. Parties and receptions for the artists were also organised by the record labels Ariola, Polydor and Deutsche Grammophon. Ralph Siegel, composer of the winning entry for Germany in 1982, and his own record label Jupiter Records, held a party for 1,000 guests, including many artists, on 21 April 1983.

A press centre with television monitors, typewriters, telephones and paper notebooks was installed for the 600 journalists covering the event.

German Bundespost installed a post office from 18 to 23 April at the Rudi-Sedlmayr-Halle and stamped letters from there with a special Eurovision Song Contest postmark.

=== Presentation format ===
Instead of pre-filmed "postcards", the production team for this edition chose not to produce the postcards for technical reasons. During the change of the stage elements, the name of the next country was shown on screen accompanied by music from the orchestra, followed by a presentation of the upcoming entry by Marlene Charell.

After the first rehearsals, the Austrian and British commentators complained that, since there were no postcards, they felt that there was not enough time to introduce the upcoming entry to their viewers, and subsequently threatened to withdraw from the contest. As a reaction, for the live show and latter rehearsals, the name of the upcoming country was shown on screen for a certain time so that commentators had enough time.

For the introduction of each entry, Charell stood in front of individual flower arrangements with flowers in the colours of the corresponding entry’s national flag. The floral arrangements were provided by the International Garden Expo 83 organization, as the event was also scheduled to start five days after the contest. Hostess Marlene Charell made all of her announcements in German before translating a repetition in both French and English. In all three languages, Charell named the country, song title, performing artist, author, composer and conductor. The decision not to use postcards apparently left Marlene lost during the event, as she would have to use three languages to introduce each of the participants.

Due to host Charell's use of three languages, the voting went on for nearly an hour, stretching the Eurovision contest past three hours for the second time ever, the first after 1979. In addition, Charell made 13 language mistakes throughout the night, some as innocuous as mixing up the words for "points" between the three languages, some as major as nearly awarding points to "Schweden" (Sweden) that were meant for "Schweiz" (Switzerland).

The language problems also occurred during the contest introductions, as Charell mispronounced the Finnish singer Ami Aspelund's surname as "Aspesund", Spanish singer Remedios Amaya's name as "Ramedios" and Portuguese singer Armando Gama's name as "Armendo". Furthermore, she introduced the Norwegian conductor Sigurd Jansen as "...Johannes...Skorgan...", and Yugoslavian conductor Radovan Papović as "Rodovan Popović" having been forced to make up a name on the spot after forgetting the conductor's name.

== Contest overview ==
The contest took place on 23 April 1983, beginning at 21:00 CEST (19:00 UTC). At the start of the broadcast, a 7-minutes-long film with views of various sights of Germany and of the host city Munich was shown. As part of the introduction, a parade of nations was called by the presenter Marlene Charell. The interval act was a dance number set to a medley of German songs which had become internationally famous, including "Strangers in the Night". The host Marlene Charell was the lead dancer accompanied by her ballet with 20 dancers from her company.

Considered the big favourite of the night by the press, the Luxembourgish entry did not enjoy the same prestige among the local public who considered it a bad joke, and this was reflected in a series of hostilities from the public in Munich, to the point that the show director Rainer Bertram and Roger Kreischer, their counterpart at the Luxembourgish broadcaster RTL, openly criticized the mocking tone of the local media and the public present at the venue towards the Luxembourgish entry. It was famously seen during the broadcast that a good part of the public present at the contest site voluntarily left during the performance of Corinne Hermès, which according to the draw was the last of the 20 participating songs. Other embarrassing reactions towards the Luxembourgish participant were recorded during the voting. Each time the name Luxembourg was announced by the jury spokespeople from each country, laughters and some joking words were heard and when high scores appeared, boos and another low slangs ensued. When Corinne Hermès performed her reprise, a great part of the audience was already leaving.

After the show, a reception for 1,600 guests on behalf of the city of Munich took place in a tent of the International Garden Expo 83.

Results of the Eurovision Song Contest 1983
R/O	Country	Artist	Song	Points	Place
1	France	Guy Bonnet	"Vivre"	56	8
2	Norway	Jahn Teigen	"Do Re Mi"	53	9
3	United Kingdom	Sweet Dreams	"I'm Never Giving Up"	79	6
4	Sweden	Carola Häggkvist	"Främling"	126	3
5	Italy	Riccardo Fogli	"Per Lucia"	41	11
6	Turkey	Çetin Alp and the Short Wave	"Opera"	0	19
7	Spain	Remedios Amaya	"Quién maneja mi barca"	0	19
8	Switzerland	Mariella Farré	"Io così non ci sto"	28	15
9	Finland	Ami Aspelund	"Fantasiaa"	41	11
10	Greece	Christie	"Mou les"	32	14
11	Netherlands	Bernadette	"Sing Me a Song"	66	7
12	Yugoslavia	Daniel	"Džuli"	125	4
13	Cyprus	Stavros and Constantina	"I agapi akoma zi"	26	16
14	Germany	Hoffmann and Hoffmann	"Rücksicht"	94	5
15	Denmark	Gry Johansen	"Kloden drejer"	16	17
16	Israel	Ofra Haza	"Chai"	136	2
17	Portugal	Armando Gama	"Esta balada que te dou"	33	13
18	Austria	Westend	"Hurricane"	53	9
19	Belgium	Pas de Deux	"Rendez-vous"	13	18
20	Luxembourg	Corinne Hermès	"Si la vie est cadeau"	142	1

=== Spokespersons ===
Each participating broadcaster appointed a spokesperson who was responsible for announcing the votes for its respective country via telephone. Known spokespersons at the 1983 contest are listed below.

- Denmark – Bent Evold
- Finland – Solveig Herlin
- Netherlands – Flip van der Schalie
- Spain – Rosa Campano
- Sweden – Agneta Bolme Börjefors
- United Kingdom – Colin Berry

== Detailed voting results ==
Each participating broadcaster assembled a jury consisting of 11 non-professional jurors who awarded 12, 10, 8, 7, 6, 5, 4, 3, 2, 1 point(s) to their top ten songs.

Detailed voting results
		Total score	France	Norway	United Kingdom	Sweden	Italy	Turkey	Spain	Switzerland	Finland	Greece	Netherlands	Yugoslavia	Cyprus	Germany	Denmark	Israel	Portugal	Austria	Belgium	Luxembourg
Contestants	France	56		3			10			10	6	7	2	3	4	4		1	3			3
Contestants	Norway	53			5	3		6					8			1	8	4	6	3	7	2
Contestants	United Kingdom	79	5	5		12	2	5		8		5	5		6	3	5		2	10		6
Contestants	Sweden	126	6	12	8		8	7	2	5	10	10	3	1	7	12	10	8	4	8	5	
Contestants	Italy	41	7			2		4	3		1	2		8	1			6	7			
Contestants	Turkey	0																				
Contestants	Spain	0																				
Contestants	Switzerland	28		1			7		1					7						6	1	5
Contestants	Finland	41	1	2	6			3		4		8				7		7		2		1
Contestants	Greece	32	3						12		5				12							
Contestants	Netherlands	66	2	7	1	6	4	2		12	3			5	5	2	4	3		4	2	4
Contestants	Yugoslavia	125		8	12		1	12	10		12	6	7		8	6	12	10		1	12	8
Contestants	Cyprus	26		4						1				6		5	1	5			4	
Contestants	Germany	94	10	10	7	8	6			2	4	1	10				3		8	7	6	12
Contestants	Denmark	16			2	7		1	4						2							
Contestants	Israel	136	8	6	10	5	3		6	7	7	3	12	10		10	7		10	12	10	10
Contestants	Portugal	33	4			1			5	6	2		6	2								7
Contestants	Austria	53			3	4	5	10				4	4	4	3		6	2	5		3	
Contestants	Belgium	13			4				8										1			
Contestants	Luxembourg	142	12			10	12	8	7	3	8	12	1	12	10	8	2	12	12	5	8	

=== 12 points ===
Below is a summary of all 12 points in the final:

N.	Contestant	Nation(s) giving 12 points
6	Luxembourg	France, Greece, Israel, Italy, Portugal, Yugoslavia
5	Yugoslavia	Belgium, Denmark, Finland, Turkey, United Kingdom
2	Greece	Cyprus, Spain
2	Israel	Austria, Netherlands
2	Sweden	Germany, Norway
1	Germany	Luxembourg
1	Netherlands	Switzerland
1	United Kingdom	Sweden

== Broadcasts ==
Each participating broadcaster was required to relay the contest via its networks. Non-participating EBU member broadcasters were also able to relay the contest as "passive participants". Broadcasters were able to send commentators to provide coverage of the contest in their own native language and to relay information about the artists and songs to their television viewers. Host broadcaster BR provided 30 commentator boxes for this purpose.

The contest was reportedly broadcast in 30 countries, including the Eastern Bloc countries, Jordan and Hong Kong. No official accounts of the global viewing figures are known to exist, with estimates given in the press at the time ranging from 300 to 600 million viewers. Known details on the broadcasts in each country, including the specific broadcasting stations and commentators are shown in the tables below.

Broadcasters and commentators in participating countries
Country	Broadcaster	Channel(s)	Commentator(s)	Ref.
Austria	ORF	FS2	Ernst Grissemann	
Belgium	BRT	TV1	Luc Appermont	
Belgium	BRT	BRT 2 Omroep Brabant	Luk de Laat	
Belgium	RTBF	Télé 2	Jacques Mercier	
Belgium	RTBF	RTBF 1		
Cyprus	CyBC	RIK		
Denmark	DR	DR TV	Jørgen de Mylius	
Finland	YLE	TV1	Erkki Pohjanheimo	
Finland	YLE	Rinnakkaisohjelma	Markus Similä	
France	Antenne 2		Léon Zitrone	
France	RFO	RFO-Martinique (Note: Delayed broadcast on 8 June 1983 at 20:02 (AST))		
Germany	ARD	Deutsches Fernsehen	Ado Schlier	
Germany	BR	Bayern 1	Ado Schlier	
Germany	HR	Frankfurt 1	Ado Schlier	
Germany	NDR	NDR 2	Ado Schlier	
Germany	RIAS	RIAS 1	Ado Schlier	
Greece	ERT	ERT1, B Programma		
Israel	IBA	Israeli Television, Reshet Bet		
Italy	RAI	Rete Uno (Note: Deferred broadcast at 22:00 (CEST))	Paolo Frajese	
Luxembourg	CLT	RTL Télévision	Valérie Sarn	
Netherlands	NOS	Nederland 1	Willem Duys	
Norway	NRK	NRK Fjernsynet	Ivar Dyrhaug	
Norway	NRK	NRK (Note: Deferred broadcast at 22:50 (CEST))	Erik Heyerdahl	
Portugal	RTP	RTP1	Eládio Clímaco	
Portugal	RDP	Antena 1		
Spain	TVE	TVE 1	José-Miguel Ullán	
Sweden	SVT	TV1	Ulf Elfving	
Sweden	RR	SR P3	Kent Finell	
Switzerland	SRG SSR	TV DRS	Theodor Haller	
Switzerland	SRG SSR	TSR (Note: Broadcast through a second audio programme on TV DRS)	Georges Hardy	
Switzerland	SRG SSR	TSI	Giovanni Bertini	
Turkey	TRT	TRT Televizyon		
United Kingdom	BBC	BBC1	Terry Wogan	
United Kingdom	BFBS	BFBS Radio	Richard Nankivell	
Yugoslavia	JRT	TV Beograd 1, TV Novi Sad, TV Prishtina, TV Zagreb 1	Oliver Mlakar	
Yugoslavia	JRT	TV Ljubljana 1		

Broadcasters and commentators in non-participating countries
Country	Broadcaster	Channel(s)	Commentator(s)	Ref.
Australia	SBS	Channel 0/28 (Note: Deferred broadcast the following day at 19:30 (AEST))	Terry Wogan	
Czechoslovakia	ČST	II. program (Note: Delayed broadcast on 20 May 1983 at 22:00 (CEST))		
Faroe Islands	SvF (Note: Delayed broadcast on 1 May 1983 at 20:00 (WEST))			
Greenland	KNR	KNR (Note: Delayed broadcast on 30 April 1983 at 20:20 (WGST))		
Iceland	RÚV	Sjónvarpið		
Ireland	RTÉ	RTÉ 1	Terry Wogan	
Ireland	RTÉ	RTÉ Radio 1	Brendan Balfe	
Poland	TP	TP1 (Note: Delayed broadcast on 21 May 1983 at 20:15 (CEST))		
Romania	TVR	Programul 1 (Note: Delayed broadcast in a shortened format on 30 April 1983 at 22:20 (EEST))		
South Africa	SABC	Radio 5		
