= Denmark in the Eurovision Song Contest 1983 =

- Eurovision Song Contest 1983
- Participating broadcaster: Danmarks Radio (DR)
- Country: Denmark
- Selection process: Dansk Melodi Grand Prix 1983
- Selection date: 5 March 1983

Competing entry
- Song: "Kloden drejer"
- Artist: Gry Johansen
- Songwriters: Flemming Gernyx; Christian Jacobsen; Lars Christensen

Placement
- Final result: 17th, 16 points

Participation chronology

Denmark was represented at the Eurovision Song Contest 1983 with the song "Kloden drejer", written by Flemming Gernyx, Christian Jacobsen, and Lars Christensen, and performed by Gry Johansen. The Danish participating broadcaster, Danmarks Radio (DR), organised the Dansk Melodi Grand Prix 1983 in order to select its entry for the contest.

== Before Eurovision ==
=== Dansk Melodi Grand Prix 1983 ===
Danmarks Radio (DR) held the Dansk Melodi Grand Prix 1983 on 5 March at TV-Byen in Gladsaxe, hosted by Jørgen de Mylius. Ten songs took part with the winner being decided by voting from five regional juries.

The 1983 contest also saw the first DMGP appearance of Kirsten Siggaard who, as a member of Hot Eyes and as a solo singer, would become a familiar face at DMGP and Eurovision for years to come. John Hatting had been a member of the previous year's Danish representatives Brixx.

Final – 5 March 1983
R/O	Artist	Song	Points	Place
1	Plateau	"Mennesker mødes"	36	4
2	John Hatting	"Stjernerne er drevet bort"	30	5
3	Snapshot	"Gi'r du et knus"	50	2
4	Vivian Johansen and Los Valentinos	"Fred"	19	8
5	Merete Ruud-Hansen	"Hen over engen"	23	6
6	Käte and Per	"Sesam, luk dig op"	37	3
7	Kirsten Siggaard and Sir Henry	"Og livet går"	22	7
8	Joy	"Hvor går livet hen"	5	10
9	Gry Johansen	"Kloden drejer"	60	1
10	Roberto	"Aldrig igen"	17	9

Detailed Regional Jury Votes
R/O	Song	West Jutland	East Jutland	Funen, Lolland-Falster and Bornholm	Zealand	Capital Region	Total
1	"Mennesker mødes"	7	6	8	8	7	36
2	"Stjernerne er drevet bort"	5	7	4	8	6	30
3	"Gi'r du et knus"	10	10	10	10	10	50
4	"Fred"	3	4	5	3	4	19
5	"Hen over engen"	8	4	6	3	2	23
6	"Sesam, luk dig op"	6	8	8	5	10	37
7	"Og livet går"	5	5	3	4	5	22
8	"Hvor går livet hen"	1	1	1	1	1	5
9	"Kloden drejer"	12	12	12	12	12	60
10	"Aldrig igen"	2	2	2	8	3	17

== At Eurovision ==
On the evening of the final Johansen performed 15th in the running order, following Germany and preceding Cyprus. At the close of voting "Kloden drejer" had received 16 points, placing Denmark 17th of the 20 entries. The Danish jury awarded its 12 points to Yugoslavia.

The contest was broadcast on DR TV, with commentary by Jørgen de Mylius.

=== Voting ===
Points awarded to Denmark
Score	Country
12 points	
10 points	
8 points	
7 points	Sweden
6 points	
5 points	
4 points	Spain
3 points	
2 points	Cyprus; United Kingdom
1 point	Turkey

Points awarded by Denmark
Score	Country
12 points	Yugoslavia
10 points	Sweden
8 points	Norway
7 points	Israel
6 points	Austria
5 points	United Kingdom
4 points	Netherlands
3 points	Germany
2 points	Luxembourg
1 point	Cyprus
