= Turkey in the Eurovision Song Contest 1983 =

- Eurovision Song Contest 1983
- Participating broadcaster: Turkish Radio and Television Corporation (TRT)
- Country: Turkey
- Selection process: 7. Eurovision Şarkı Yarışması Türkiye Finali
- Selection date: 4 March 1983

Competing entry
- Song: "Opera"
- Artist: Çetin Alp and the Short Wave
- Songwriters: Buğra Uğur; Aysel Gürel

Placement
- Final result: 19th, 0 points

Participation chronology

Turkey was represented at the Eurovision Song Contest 1983 with the song "Opera", composed by Buğra Uğur, with lyrics by Aysel Gürel, and performed by Çetin Alp & the Short Wave. The Turkish participating broadcaster, the Turkish Radio and Television Corporation (TRT), selected its entry through a national final.

== Before Eurovision ==
=== 7. Eurovision Şarkı Yarışması Türkiye Finali ===
The Turkish Radio and Television Corporation (TRT) held the national final on 4 March 1983 at its studios in Ankara, hosted by Başak Doğru. Eight songs competed and the winner was determined by an expert jury.

Final – 4 March 1983
R/O	Artist	Song	Lyricist	Composer	Place
1	Vedat Sakman	"Müzisyen"	Vedat Sakman		—N/a
2	Hakan Sıvacı	"Boğaziçi"	Salim Ağırbaş	Gürol Ağırbaş	—N/a
3	Ayşegül Aldinç	"Heyecan"	Cansın Erol	Selahattin İçli	3
4	Mehmet Şengenç	"Yaşayamam"	Yusuf Eradam		—N/a
5	Coşkun Demir	"Dön Bana"	Karen Garson	Aydın Esen	—N/a
6	Çetin Alp and the Short Waves	"Opera"	Aysel Gürel	Buğra Uğur	1
7	Mavi Yolcular	"Heyamola"	Ali Kocatepe		—N/a
8	Beş Yıl Önce, On Yıl Sonra	"Atlantis"	Aysel Gürel	Attila Özdemiroğlu	2

== At Eurovision ==
On the evening of the contest Alp performed 6th following Italy and preceding Spain. At the close of voting Opera had received nul points placing Turkey joint 19 place (along with Spain). The Turkish jury awarded its 12 points to Yugoslavia.

=== Voting ===
Turkey did not receive any points at the Eurovision Song Contest 1983.

Points awarded by Turkey
Score	Country
12 points	Yugoslavia
10 points	Austria
8 points	Luxembourg
7 points	Sweden
6 points	Norway
5 points	United Kingdom
4 points	Italy
3 points	Finland
2 points	Netherlands
1 point	Denmark
