= Aspelund =

Aspelund is a Norwegian, Finnish, and also a rare Swedish-language surname. Notable people with the surname include:

- Ami Aspelund (born 1953), Finnish singer
- Helge Aspelund, Finnish chemist
- Monica Aspelund (born 1946), Finnish singer
