= Norway in the Eurovision Song Contest 1983 =

- Eurovision Song Contest 1983
- Participating broadcaster: Norsk rikskringkasting (NRK)
- Country: Norway
- Selection process: Melodi Grand Prix 1983
- Selection date: 25 February 1983

Competing entry
- Song: "Do Re Mi"
- Artist: Jahn Teigen
- Songwriters: Jahn Teigen; Anita Skorgan; Herodes Falsk

Placement
- Final result: 9th, 53 points

Participation chronology

Norway was represented at the Eurovision Song Contest 1983 with the song "Do Re Mi", written by Jahn Teigen, Anita Skorgan, and Herodes Falsk, and performed by Teigen himself. The Norwegian participating broadcaster, Norsk rikskringkasting (NRK), selected its entry through the Melodi Grand Prix 1983. This was the third and final Eurovision appearance by Teigen. Although uncredited on this occasion, one of his backing singers was Anita Skorgan, making her fourth appearance in seven years.

== Before Eurovision ==
=== Melodi Grand Prix 1983 ===
Norsk rikskringkasting (NRK) held the Melodi Grand Prix 1983 at its studios in Oslo, hosted by Ivar Dyrhaug. Ten songs took part in the final, with the winner chosen by voting from 12 regional juries.

Final – 25 February 1983
R/O	Artist	Song	Points	Place
1	Ketil Stokkan	"Samme charmeur"	107	2
2	Anita Hegerland	"Nå er jeg alene"	57	7
3	Elisabeth Berg	"Music"	20	10
4	Nissa Nyberget	"Du ber meg om evighet"	70	5
5	Cathy Ryen	"Lengsel"	59	6
6	Olav Stedje	"Melodi"	83	4
7	Jahn Teigen	"Do Re Mi"	120	1
8	Inger Lise Rypdal and Freddy Dahl	"Elegi"	37	9
9	Susanne Fuhr	"Det fineste jeg vet"	45	8
10	Dizzie Tunes	"Gjennom ild og vann"	98	3

Detailed Regional Jury Votes
R/O	Song	Karasjok	Oslo	Stavanger	Trondheim	Elverum	Vadsø	Bergen	Porsgrunn	Tromsø	Kristiansand	Ålesund	Bodø	Total
1	"Samme charmeur"	10	8	6	5	8	10	12	8	12	6	10	12	107
2	"Nå er jeg alene"	6	3	7	1	3	5	4	6	8	5	4	5	57
3	"Music"	1	1	1	7	1	1	1	1	1	2	1	2	20
4	"Du ber meg om evighet"	3	10	8	4	5	6	7	5	4	4	6	8	70
5	"Lengsel"	5	5	4	3	7	4	5	4	5	10	3	4	59
6	"Melodi"	8	12	5	2	4	8	10	7	6	7	7	7	83
7	"Do Re Mi"	12	6	12	8	6	12	8	12	10	12	12	10	120
8	"Elegi"	2	4	2	12	2	2	3	2	2	1	2	3	37
9	"Det fineste jeg vet"	4	2	3	6	10	3	2	3	3	3	5	1	45
10	"Gjennom ild og vann"	7	7	10	10	12	7	6	10	7	8	8	6	98

== At Eurovision ==
On the night of the final Teigen performed second in the running order, following France and preceding the United Kingdom. At the close of voting "Do Re Mi" had picked up 53 points (the highest being 8s from Denmark and the Netherlands), placing Norway joint 9th (with Austria) of the 20 entries, the country's first top 10 finish since 1973. The Norwegian jury awarded its 12 points to Sweden.

=== Voting ===
Points awarded to Norway
Score	Country
12 points	
10 points	
8 points	Denmark; Netherlands
7 points	Belgium
6 points	Portugal; Turkey
5 points	United Kingdom
4 points	Israel
3 points	Austria; Sweden
2 points	Luxembourg
1 point	Germany

Points awarded by Norway
Score	Country
12 points	Sweden
10 points	Germany
8 points	Yugoslavia
7 points	Netherlands
6 points	Israel
5 points	United Kingdom
4 points	Cyprus
3 points	France
2 points	Finland
1 point	Switzerland
