= Hoffmann & Hoffmann =

German musical duo

Hoffmann & Hoffmann were a German singing duo consisting of brothers Michael Hoffmann (born 3 December 1950, Karlsruhe) and Günter Hoffmann (born 4 October 1951, Karlsruhe - died 15 March 1984, Rio de Janeiro, Brazil). They had several hits in Germany and are known for their participation in the 1983 Eurovision Song Contest.

== Career ==
The Hoffmanns' first success came in 1977 with the single "Himbeereis zum Frühstück" ("Raspberry Ice-Cream for Breakfast"), a German version of The Bellamy Brothers' "Crossfire", which reached the top 20. They had four further minor charting singles in the next few years, but their career seemed to lose impetus.

== Eurovision Song Contest ==
In 1983, the Hoffmanns took part in the German Eurovision selection, and their song "Rücksicht" ("Consideration") was chosen to go forward to the 28th Eurovision Song Contest, held on home ground in Munich on 23 April. "Rücksicht" finished the evening in a respectable fifth place of 20 entries.

== Post-Eurovision ==
"Rücksicht" proved to be the biggest hit of the Hoffmanns' career, but did not translate into the lasting success the brothers had hoped for. Less than a year after their Eurovision appearance, Günter Hoffmann committed suicide, aged 32, by jumping from a hotel window in Rio de Janeiro on 15 March 1984.

Thereafter, Michael Hoffmann worked mainly as a producer and composer for artists including fellow Eurovision veterans Gitte Hænning, Wencke Myhre and Nicole. In 1987, he entered the German Eurovision heats as a solo singer with the song "Ich geb' nicht auf", which finished fifth. He has since gone on to become a producer of spiritual and meditative music.

== Chart singles ==
(Indicates highest position on German Singles Chart)

- 1977: "Himbeereis zum Frühstück" (#14)
- 1979: "Alles, was ich brauche, bist Du" (#22)
- 1980: "Wenn ich Dich verlier" (#35)
- 1980: "Warten" (#61)
- 1981: "Ein Engel unterm Dach" (#71)
- 1983: "Rücksicht" (#8)

Preceded by Nicole with Ein bißchen Frieden	Germany in the Eurovision Song Contest; 1983	Succeeded by Mary Roos with Aufrecht geh'n
