= Belgium in the Eurovision Song Contest 1983 =

- Eurovision Song Contest 1983
- Participating broadcaster: Belgische Radio- en Televisieomroep (BRT)
- Country: Belgium
- Selection process: Eurosong 1983
- Selection date: 19 March 1983

Competing entry
- Song: "Rendez-vous"
- Artist: Pas de Deux
- Songwriters: Walter Verdin; Paul Peyskens

Placement
- Final result: 18th, 13 points

Participation chronology

Belgium was represented at the Eurovision Song Contest 1983 with the song "Rendez-vous", composed by Walter Verdin, with lyrics by Paul Peyskens, and performed by the band Pas de Deux. The Belgian participating broadcaster, Flemish Belgische Radio- en Televisieomroep (BRT), selected its entry through a national final.

The 1983 national final has gone down as the most controversial in Belgian Eurovision history due to the extreme hostility shown by the audience towards Pas de Deux's victory.

== Before Eurovision ==
=== Eurosong 1983 ===
The selection consisted of three semi-finals, followed by the final on 19 March 1983. All the shows took place at the Amerikaans Theater in Brussels and were hosted by Luc Appermont. Each show had live music from the BRT Big Band conducted by Freddy Sunder, and each artist had the option to use backing vocals provided by Bob Baelemans, Fred Beekmans, Luc Smets, and Linda Williams.

==== Competing entries ====
Flemish broadcaster Belgische Radio- en Televisieomroep (BRT) selected nine artists for Eurosong 1983. Three women, three men, and three groups, with one from each category being an unknown artist, a known artist, and an artist with a unique style. However, it is unknown which of the artists fit into those groups, especially since all three groups were fairly unknown in Belgium at the time. Each of the nine artists competed with three songs.

Artist	Song	Songwriter(s)
Bart Kaëll	"Primaballerina"	Tony Kolenberg; Guy Grammant
Bart Kaëll	"Stop"	Tony Kolenberg; Guy Grammant
Bart Kaëll	"Symfonie"	Tony Kolenberg; Guy Grammant
Espresso	"Het regent"	Marc De Coninck; René Van Wijck
Espresso	"Love"	Marc De Coninck; René Van Wijck
Espresso	"Rij je mee"	Marc De Coninck; René Van Wijck
Gene Summer	"Verliefd op twee"	Fred Beekmans
Gene Summer	"Vlaanderen"	Gyuri Spies; Henk van Montfoort
Gene Summer	"Zonder wikken en wegen"	Bob Baelemans; Luc Smets
Marina Marcia	"Goodbye"	Tony Kolenberg; Guy Grammant
Marina Marcia	"Love, Liebe"	Tony Kolenberg; Guy Grammant
Marina Marcia	"Tic tac"	Tony Kolenberg; Guy Grammant
Pas de Deux	"Cello"	William Overloop; Walter Verdin; Dett Peyskens
Pas de Deux	"Hartedief (Cardiocleptomanie)"	Frank Michiels; Walter Verdin; Dett Peyskens
Pas de Deux	"Rendez-vous"	Walter Verdin; Paul Peyskens
Sofie	"Ik wil enkel van je houden"	Gus Roan
Sofie	"Met zondagochtend"	Fred Beekmans
Sofie	"Nummer één"	Fred Beekmans
Venus	"Addio, addio"	Gus Roan
Venus	"Boemerang"	Fred Beekmans
Venus	"Bye, Bye, Scoubidou"	Willy Van Couwenberghe
Wim De Craene	"Gisteren"	Wim De Craene
Wim De Craene	"Het exuberante leven van Leentje De Vries"	Wim De Craene
Wim De Craene	"Kristien"	Wim De Craene
Yvette Ravel	"Als je droomt van liefde"	Luc Smets; Yvette Ravel
Yvette Ravel	"Herinneringen"	Jacques Ran; Yvette Ravel
Yvette Ravel	"Niemand weet"	Muys; Yvette Ravel

==== Semi-finals ====
Three semi-finals were held to select the nine songs for the Belgian final. One semi-final was each dedicated to the male singers, female singers and groups. Each act performed their three candidate songs and an expert jury consisting of people from the BRT Light Music Service chose the best song from each act to go forward to the final.

Semi-final 1 – Eurosong Dames – 19 February 1983
R/O	Artist	Song	Result
1	Yvette Ravel	"Als je droomt van liefde"	Qualified
2	Marina Marcia	"Love, Liebe"	—N/a
3	Sofie	"Met zondagochtend"	—N/a
4	Yvette Ravel	"Herinneringen"	—N/a
5	Yvette Ravel	"Niemand weet"	—N/a
6	Marina Marcia	"Goodbye"	—N/a
7	Marina Marcia	"Tic tac"	Qualified
8	Sofie	"Nummer één"	Qualified
9	Sofie	"Ik wil enkel van je houden"	—N/a

Semi-final 2 – Eurosong Heren – 26 February 1983
R/O	Artist	Song	Place
1	Gene Summer	"Verliefd op twee"	—N/a
2	Bart Kaëll	"Stop"	—N/a
3	Wim De Craene	"Gisteren"	—N/a
4	Gene Summer	"Vlaanderen"	—N/a
5	Gene Summer	"Zonder wikken en wegen"	Qualified
6	Bart Kaëll	"Symfonie"	Qualified
7	Bart Kaëll	"Primaballerina"	—N/a
8	Wim De Craene	"Kristien"	Qualified
9	Wim De Craene	"Het exuberante leven van Leentje De Vries"	—N/a

Semi-final 3 – Eurosong Groepen – 5 March 1983
R/O	Artist	Song	Place
1	Venus	"Addio, addio"	—N/a
2	Espresso	"Rij je mee"	—N/a
3	Pas de Deux	"Hartedief (Cardiocleptomanie)"	—N/a
4	Venus	"Bye, Bye, Scoubidou"	Qualified
5	Venus	"Boemerang"	—N/a
6	Espresso	"Het regent"	—N/a
7	Espresso	"Love"	Qualified
8	Pas de Deux	"Rendez-vous"	Qualified
9	Pas de Deux	"Cello"	—N/a

==== Final ====
The national final was held on 19 March 1983 with nine songs competing. Voting was done by an 8-member jury of people from BRT, who each ranked their top four songs and awarded them 10, 7, 5 and 1 point(s). The jury was chaired by Tania Humblet and consisted of: Rita Goossens, Claude Blondeel, Paul De Wijngaart, Jan Schoukens, Johannes Thuy, Roel Van Bambost, Mike Verdrengh, and Zaki. Pas de Deux were the runaway winners, being placed first by six of the eight jury members.

Final – 19 March 1983
R/O	Artist	Song	Points	Place
1	Venus	"Bye, Bye, Scoubidou"	1	7
2	Gene Summer	"Zonder wikken en wegen"	2	6
3	Yvette Ravel	"Als je droomt van liefde"	6	5
4	Espresso	"Love"	1	7
5	Marina Marcia	"Tic tac"	1	7
6	Bart Kaëll	"Symfonie"	32	4
7	Pas de Deux	"Rendez-vous"	67	1
8	Sofie	"Nummer één"	40	2
9	Wim De Craene	"Kristien"	34	3

==== Controversy ====
Before the jury had even started voting, they were disappointed by the quality of the songs and had even considered refusing to pick a winner. It is rumoured that they purposefully voted for "Rendez-vous", a very minimalistic song, in protest. When the votes were starting to be announced, the audience in the theatre appeared to be rooting for a Bart Kaëll win, and as it became obvious midway through the voting that Pas de Deux were heading for a clear victory, pandemonium ensued, with each voting announcement being greeted with jeers, whistles and catcalls. Many walked out in disgust before the end of the transmission and Pas de Deux (who seemed to find the audience reaction amusing rather than upsetting) reprised their winning song to a half-empty house, having to compete against a chorus of jeers and booing. The jury members retreated to the bar in the Amerikaans Theater to hide from any aggressive Bart Kaëll fans.

The results of the national final also caused some uproar across Flanders. Several readers' letters appear in newspapers and magazines, along with their own articles, complain about the results of the national final. Some say that the jury are 'deaf' or 'left-wing alternatives', or that Pas De Deux are 'fake Flemish who speak French at home'. The singer Sofie was also upset by the results of Eurosong 1983 as she was tipped to win and was upset that the jury would choose to vote for a song out of protest when she really wanted to go to the Eurovision Song Contest. The BRT 2 radio channel also boycotts Pas De Deux.

The issue even got brought up in the Flemish Parliament. Jan Caudron, a member of the People's Union party, questioned the minister of culture, Karel Poma, on why Flanders is being represented by a band with a French name and a song with a French title. Poma responds by saying that 'Pas de deux' is a technical term in choreography, and that 'Rendez-vous' is a loanword used in Dutch and several other languages.

== At Eurovision ==
On the night of the final Pas de Deux performed 19th in the running order, following Austria and preceding the eventual winner Luxembourg. At the close of the voting "Rendez-vous" had received only 13 votes (8 from Spain, 4 from the United Kingdom, and 1 from Portugal), placing Belgium 18th of the 20 entries, ahead only of the nul-points Spanish and Turkish entries. The Belgian jury awarded its 12 points to Yugoslavia.

=== Voting ===
Points awarded to Belgium
Score	Country
12 points	
10 points	
8 points	Spain
7 points	
6 points	
5 points	
4 points	United Kingdom
3 points	
2 points	
1 point	Portugal

Points awarded by Belgium
Score	Country
12 points	Yugoslavia
10 points	Israel
8 points	Luxembourg
7 points	Norway
6 points	Germany
5 points	Sweden
4 points	Cyprus
3 points	Austria
2 points	Netherlands
1 point	Switzerland
