= Kristi Stassinopoulou =

Greek singer, lyricist and fiction writer

Chrisavgi "Kristi" Stassinopoulou (Athens, 20 January 1956) is a Greek singer, lyricist, and fiction writer. A native Athenian, she is an internationally known artist of the world music circuit. She is accompanied by composer, arranger, co-producer and multi-instrumentalist Stathis Kalyviotis. Their music combines traditional Greek rhythms and sounds, Byzantine vocal lines, rebetiko music, psychedelic rock, She represented Greece in the Eurovision Song Contest 1983 in Munich.

Her work has been compared to that of Hedningarna, Grace Slick and Björk.

== Studies and early years ==
Kristi Stassinopoulou has studied acting and drama at the school of Theatro Tehnis, Karolos Koun and at the theatre-school of Petros Katselis.

In 1978, while still a student, she participated in an audition for the Greek production of the rock opera Jesus Christ Superstar by Tim Rice and Andrew Lloyd Webber and was selected from 300 professionals and amateur singers for the role of Mary Magdalene; that was her debut as a professional singer.

In 1983 Stassinopoulou represented Greece in the Eurovision Song Contest in Munich, where she interpreted the song of Antonis Plessas, Mou Les.

At that year she was picked for the role of Juan Perón's young mistress in Tim Rice's and Andrew Lloyd Webber's rock opera Evita, produced in Athens by Aliki Vougiouklaki, who was playing the main role of Evita Peron.

== Collaboration with Stathis Kalyviotis ==
In 1989, Stassinopoulou met multi-instrumentalist/songwriter Stathis Kalyviotis, member -among others- of the Anipofori (The Unbearables), one of the first Greek punk bands in the early 80s, the first to do their songs in Greek lyrics and not in English, as was the habit in the Greek indie-underground-rock scene of the times.

Together with Stathis Kalyviotis, drummer Vangelis Vekios and guitarist Kostis Anagnostopoulos they formed, Selana (sometimes cited as Selena), a band with an ethnopunk sound that never made an album, but became cult, often performing also as the support group of late Pavlos Sidiropoulos.

In 1997, Stassinopoulou and Kalyviotis produced their first album Ifantokosmos which was released by the independent label Thesis. Their next album, Echotropia, was released in 1999. It was distributed in Greece, N. America and Brasil and was the first Greek album to reach the Top 10 position in the World Music Charts Europe.

In July 2000, Stassinopoulou, Kalyviotis and their band were the first Greeks to perform at the International Jazz Festival in Montreal , on its 21st edition. Their first North American appearance took place in July 2002 and it was organized by Dan Berhman. There they played a.o. at the Winnipeg Folk Festival in Canada, the Millennium Stage of the Kennedy Centre in Washington DC, the Central Park Summer StageFestival in New York.

In May 2001, she participated in the Greece in Britain series of concerts at the Barbican Theatre of London; Charlie Gillett, who was in the audience, hosted Stassinopoulou and Kalyviotis live in his Saturday BBC Radio 3 show, The Sound of the World.

In 2002, The Secrets of the Rocks was released in Greece by Hitch Hyke Records. In October 2002 Stassinopoulou, Kalyviotis and their band played at Womex in Essen, Germany. In January 2003 The Secrets of the Rocks reached number 1 on the World Music Charts Europe, went number 2 in February and remained for 6 months in total in the top-10 list. The album was also released in N. America, Spain the U.K.

In March 2003, Stassinopoulou was the cover story of the world music UK magazine, fRoots, interviewed by Ian Anderson. In October 2003 she played in Union Chappell, London, in the Europe in Union series of concerts organized by fRoots. In August and September 2004, Stassinopoulou and Kalyviotis toured for one-month tour in 17 cities in Brazil, Mostra de Artes Mediterraneo, Roteiro Verde 2005.

In 2007, Taxidoscopio was released in Spain, Germany, Japan and Greece and was included in the top-15 of WOMEX World Music CDs of the year. Together with their band, or as a duo, Stassinopoulou and Kalyviotis have appeared on several music festivals and clubs in Europe, N. America and Brazil.

In 2012, Greekadelia was released worldwide by World Music Network/Riverboat. The album was launched at the Green Note, Camden, London on 24 June. In the World Music Charts Europe of August 2012 the album was number one charts hit.

== Other activities ==
Stassinopoulou has published two books:

Her first book Epta Fores stin Amorgo (Seven Times in Amorgos) containing seven mystery short stories set on the Cycladic island of Amorgos, was published in 1993 by Kastaniotis Editions.

Her second book Pyrini Romfaia (Fiery Sword) is a novel of magic set in Athens in the early 1990s and was published in 1995 by Livanis Editions.

She has also been writing and publishing short-stories and articles mainly on music, in magazines and fanzines. Stassinopoulou has also worked as a radio producer, presenting her own radio shows in the Athenian-based radios: Sky 100,4 (1989–1992), Kanali 15 (1992-3), En Lefko (1998-9)..

Stassinopoulou also supplied voices of Ariel in the 1990 Greek dub of The Little Mermaid, Belle in the Greek dub of Beauty and the Beast, Shanti in the Greek dub of The Jungle Book, Bambi's mother in the Greek dub of Bambi, and she voiced a supporting character in the Greek dub of The Rescuers Down Under.

== Discography ==
Year	Title	Notes
1986	Kristi Stasinopoulou	-
1993	By the lake with the Poppies	-
1997	Ifantokosmos	-
2001	Echotropia	Top10 in the World Music Charts Europe
2003	The Secrets of the Rocks	#1 in the World Music Charts Europe
2006	Taxidoskopio	-
2012	Greekadelia	#1 in the World Music Charts Europe
2016	NYN	No 1 in Transglobal World Music Charts
