= Vincenzo Spampinato =

Italian singer-songwriter

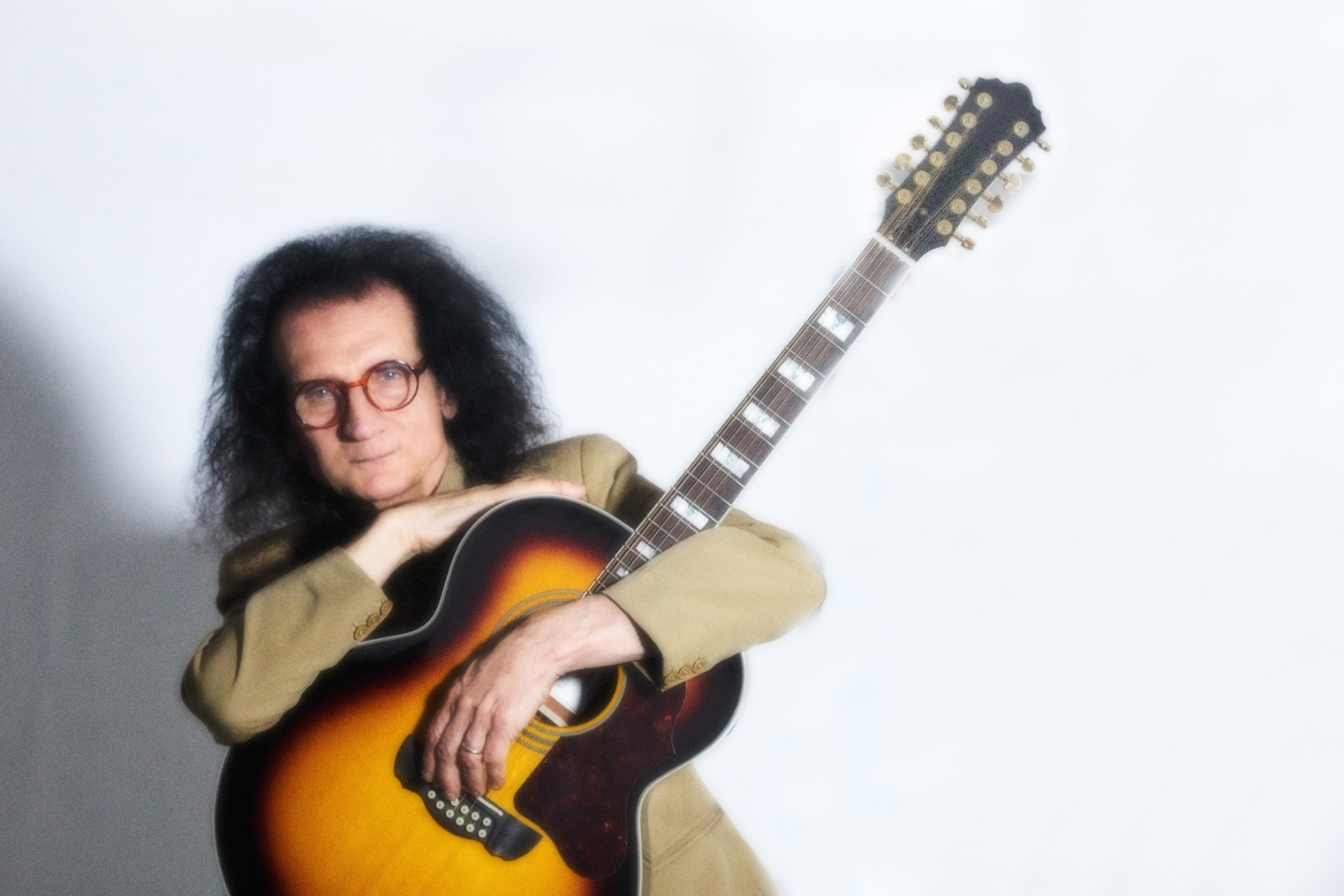
- Born: 1953 (age 72–73); Catania, Italy
- Occupation: singer-songwriter

Vincenzo Spampinato (born in 1953) is an Italian pop-rock singer-songwriter, composer and lyricist.

== Background ==
Born in Catania, at very young age Spampinato was a member of the musical group Rovers. He debuted as a soloist in 1978, then he achieved some success with the songs "Batti un colpo Maria" (1979) and "Innamorati di me" (1981) and with the album Dolce e amaro (1980). In the eighties he started a productive collaboration with Riccardo Fogli, composing for him "Per Lucia" (Italian entry in the 1983 Eurovision Song Contest) and three consecutive albums. From the nineties he is also active as composer of musical scores for television, theatre and commercials.

Spampinato is the composer of "Madreterra", the official anthem of Sicily from 2003.
