= Remedios Amaya =

Spanish flamenco singer

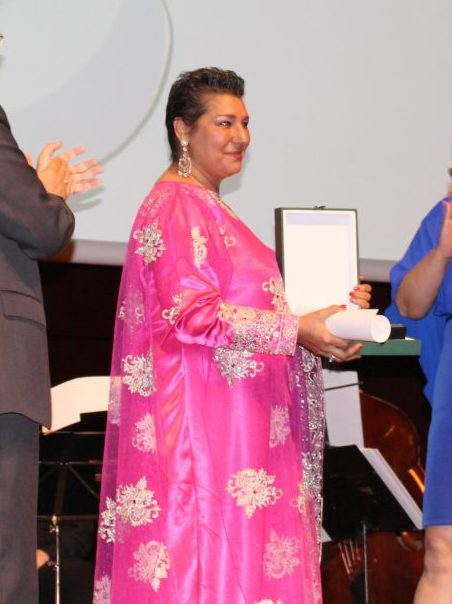
- Remedios Amaya (2017)

Background information
- Born: María Dolores Amaya Vega; 1 May 1962; Seville, Spain
- Genres: Flamenco
- Occupation: Singer

María Dolores Amaya Vega (born 1 May 1962 in Seville), better known by her stage name Remedios Amaya (Spanish pronunciation: [reˈmeðjos aˈmaʝa]), is a Spanish flamenco singer. She represented Spain at the Eurovision Song Contest 1983. Remedios Amaya has been popular with international audiences since the debut of her first self-titled album in '78.

Her first album, the self-titled Remedios Amaya, was published in 1978. In 1983 she was internally selected by Televisión Española to represent Spain in the Eurovision Song Contest 1983 in Munich. She scored nul points with the song "¿Quién maneja mi barca?".

Amaya's first works, Luna nueva (1983) and Seda en mi piel (1984), were an example of flamenco-rock. In 1997 she released the album Me voy contigo (1997), produced by Vicente Amigo; the album sold more than 150,000 copies. It included her biggest hit, "Turu Turai". The following albums were Gitana soy (2001) and Sonsonete (2002), and in 2004 she released a Greatest Hits compilation. In 2016, she released a new album, Rompiendo el silencio.

Awards and achievements
Preceded by Lucía with "Él"	Spain in the Eurovision Song Contest; 1983	Succeeded by Bravo with "Lady, Lady"
