= Mariella Farré =

- Birth name: Gabriella Filomeno
- Born: 7 January 1963 (age 62)
- Origin: Thurgau, Switzerland
- Genres: Pop
- Occupation: Singer
- Website: Mariella Farré

Mariella Farré (born 7 January 1963 in Thurgau as Gabriella Filomeno) is a Swiss singer of Italian descent, best known for her participation in the Eurovision Song Contests of 1983 and 1985.

Farré's first attempt at Eurovision came in 1981 when, as a newcomer, she entered the Swiss selection heat, only for her song "Una cosa meravigliosa" to finish sixth and last. She was to have more luck in 1983 with "Io così non-ci sto" ("I Don't Like It This Way"), which won the selection and went forward to the 28th Eurovision Song Contest which took place on 23 April in Munich, where it finished in a disappointing 15th place of the 20 entries. Undeterred, Farré returned in 1985 with two participating songs; a solo entitled "Oh, mein Pierrot", and "Piano, piano", a duet with Pino Gasparini (himself a Eurovision veteran, having been the lead singer with Switzerland's 1977 entrants the Pepe Lienhard Band). "Piano, Piano" (which despite its title was sung in German) emerged the winner and advanced to the 1985 Eurovision, held in Gothenburg, Sweden on 4 May. Farré this time got a slightly better result, 12th of 19.

Farré subsequently moved into dance and choreography, which she has made into a successful career. She currently owns and runs two dance training schools in the Aargau canton of northern Switzerland.

Awards and achievements
Preceded by Arlette Zola with "Amour on t'aime"	Switzerland in the Eurovision Song Contest; 1983	Succeeded by Rainy Day with "Welche Farbe hat der Sonnenschein?"
Preceded by Rainy Day with "Welche Farbe hat der Sonnenschein?"	Switzerland in the Eurovision Song Contest; 1985 (with Pino Gasparini)	Succeeded by Daniela Simmons with "Pas pour moi"
