= Sweden in the Eurovision Song Contest 1983 =

- Eurovision Song Contest 1983
- Participating broadcaster: Sveriges Television (SVT)
- Country: Sweden
- Selection process: Melodifestivalen 1983
- Selection date: 26 February 1983

Competing entry
- Song: "Främling"
- Artist: Carola Häggkvist
- Songwriters: Lasse Holm; Monica Forsberg

Placement
- Final result: 3rd, 126 points

Participation chronology

Sweden was represented at the Eurovision Song Contest 1983 with the song "Främling", composed by Lasse Holm, with lyrics by Monica Forsberg, and performed by Carola Häggkvist. The Swedish participating broadcaster, Sveriges Television (SVT), selected its entry through Melodifestivalen 1983.

== Before Eurovision ==
=== Melodifestivalen 1983 ===
Melodifestivalen 1983 was the selection for the 23rd song to represent Sweden at the Eurovision Song Contest. It was the 22nd time that this system of picking a song had been used. 90 songs were submitted to Sveriges Television (SVT) for the competition. The final was held in the Palladium in Malmö on 26 February 1983, presented by Bibi Johns and was broadcast on TV1 but was not broadcast on radio.

"Främling" was the first entry ever to get maximum points from all of the eleven juries, prompting the presenter to say before the final votes were announced: "Det här är inte alls spännande!" (This isn't at all exciting!). It was performed by the 17-year-old –and then unknown– Carola Häggkvist, who quickly went on to be one of Sweden's most popular singers. The song was written by Lasse Holm and Monica Forsberg, who had also written the previous winning song together.

R/O	Artist	Song	Songwriter(s)	Place
1	Ritz	"Marionett"	Monica Forsberg; Peter Wanngren	Qualified
2	Kerstin Dahlberg	"Här är min sång till dig"	Olle Bergman; Claes Bure	—N/a
3	Karin Glenmark	"Se"	Östen Warnerbring	Qualified
4	Kikki Danielsson	"Varför är kärleken röd?"	Torgny Söderberg	Qualified
5	Peter Lundblad and Agneta Olsson	"Vill du ha mig efter gryningen"	Peter Lundblad; Agneta Olsson	—N/a
6	Karina Rydberg	"Nu börjar mitt liv"	Peter Himmelstrand	—N/a
7	Ann-Louise Hanson and John Ballard	"Bara en enda gång"	Ingela 'Pling' Forsman; Anders Glenmark	Qualified
8	Maria Wickman	"Okej, jag ger mig"	Anders Hall; Johan Nordlander; Henrik Wikström	—N/a
9	Nils-Åke Runesson	"Värmen som du gav"	Nils-Åke Runesson; Lennart Kristensson	—N/a
10	Carola Häggkvist	"Främling"	Lasse Holm; Monica Forsberg	Qualified

Artist	Song	Songwriter(s)	Points	Place
Ritz	"Marionett"	Monica Forsberg; Peter Wanngren	34	4
Karin Glenmark	"Se"	Östen Warnerbring	37	3
Kikki Danielsson	"Varför är kärleken röd?"	Torgny Söderberg	45	2
Ann-Louise Hanson and John Ballard	"Bara en enda gång"	Ingela 'Pling' Forsman; Anders Glenmark	27	5
Carola Häggkvist	"Främling"	Lasse Holm; Monica Forsberg	88	1

Voting
Song	Luleå	Norrköping	Umeå	Karlstad	Falun	Gothenburg	Sundsvall	Växjö	Örebro	Stockholm	Malmö	Total
"Marionett"	1	4	2	2	4	6	2	6	1	4	2	34
"Se"	6	2	4	1	6	4	4	1	2	1	6	37
"Varför är kärleken röd"	4	6	6	6	2	2	6	2	4	6	1	45
"Bara en enda gång"	2	1	1	4	1	1	1	4	6	2	4	27
"Främling"	8	8	8	8	8	8	8	8	8	8	8	88

== At Eurovision ==
The final, held in Munich, attracted an estimate of 5,6 million viewers (about 70% of Sweden's population back then). Carola was drawn #4 in a field of 20 and was considered a big favourite for the title.

Sweden received 12 points from Norway and Germany, and ended up with 126 points and a 3rd place.

=== Voting ===
Points awarded to Sweden
Score	Country
12 points	Germany; Norway
10 points	Denmark; Finland; Greece
8 points	Austria; Israel; Italy; United Kingdom
7 points	Cyprus; Turkey
6 points	France
5 points	Belgium; Switzerland
4 points	Portugal
3 points	Netherlands
2 points	Spain
1 point	Yugoslavia

Points awarded by Sweden
Score	Country
12 points	United Kingdom
10 points	Luxembourg
8 points	Germany
7 points	Denmark
6 points	Netherlands
5 points	Israel
4 points	Austria
3 points	Norway
2 points	Italy
1 point	Portugal
