= Daniela Simmons =

Swiss singer

Daniela Borruso-Sereftug (born 9 December 1959), better known by the stage name Daniela Simmons (sometimes written Simons), is a singer/songwriter/musician who represented Switzerland at the Eurovision Song Contest 1986 in Bergen with the song Pas pour moi. The song finished second behind Belgium's entry. Simmons had made previous attempts to represent Switzerland. In 1983, she came last in the national selection with Dis moi tout but took second place in 1985 with Repars à zéro. Simmons made one further Eurovision attempt in 1991 but finished second in the national heat with Come finirà?.

Awards and achievements
Preceded by Mariella Farré & Pino Gasparini with "Piano, Piano"	Switzerland in the Eurovision Song Contest; 1986	Succeeded by Carol Rich with "Moitié, moitié"
