= Ilana Avital =

Israeli singer and actress

Ilana Abiktal אילנה אביטל
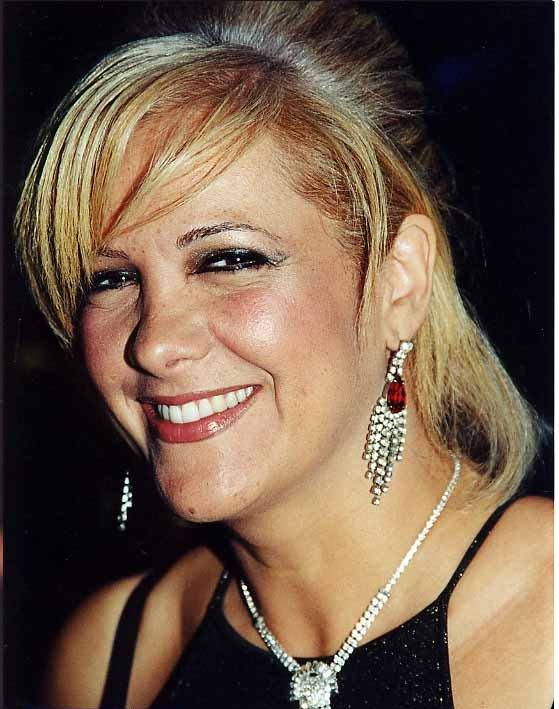

Background information
- Also known as: Lena; Sandy Miller
- Born: Brigitte Abitbol; February 18, 1960 (age 66); Paris, France
- Genre: Pop
- Occupation: Singer
- Years active: 1977 – present
- Labels: Hed Arzi; NMC; בן מוש הפקות; IMP

Ilana Avital (Hebrew: אילנה אביטל; born February 18, 1960) is an Israeli singer and actress. She also gained fame internationally, known as Lena and Sandy Miller.

== Biography ==
Avital was born in Paris, France as Brigitte Abitbol in a family of Tunisian Jewish origin. When she was 11 she immigrated to Israel with her family. At 13, she was signed to a major French record company. In 1977, she took part in the Israel Song Festival with "אותך" (Otcha, meaning You) when she was just 17. In 1978, she came third at the International Song Festival in Chile with the song "לאהוב" (Love). Her debut album לאהוב אותך was released after the competition. Her next single was "שלום חבר" (Dear Friend) and a same titled album that followed.

Avital moved briefly with her husband Shlomo Zach and son to Canada continuing her career. She released an album which was a great success in Canada, particularly with the single "Adios Amigo". Under the name Sandy Miller, she released a double-A sided single "Sympathy/Tell Her I Tried". Eventually the couple moved to France for an international career for Ilana, before coming back to Israel.

In 1984, she released her album called בזכות ימים כאלה ("right of these days" that included children's songs, and the song "Aba, Ima, ve'Eretz Israel" ("Father, Mother and the Land of Israel") composed by her. It remains a very popular children's tune in Israel.

In the 1980s and beginning of the 1990s, Avital continued to take part in many other festivals particularly in a number of selection processes for Eurovision for Israel (known as Kdam Eurovision) and for France, but without winning. The first time for her bid to represent Israel in Eurovision was in 1983 with the song "Od va'od" (More and more). She returned again for a second try in 1987 with "Dai li dai" (Enough is enough). In 1991 she came back to try with "A'avati ha'achrona" (My last love) and for a fourth occasion with 1996 with "Laisse moi t'aimer". She also took once in the French selection process for Eurovision finishing second.

In 1998 she played in the French musical production of Beauty and the Beast. She gained more fame after her French release Ilina Made in France that included classics like "ne me quitte pas" and "Encore une fois". She moved to acting, like in the TV series לגעת באושר (Touching Happiness) and a small role in the sequel film in the series of Lemon Popsicle and in the series סיטי טאוור ("City Tower").

In May 2002, she was in the musical מרי לו ("Mary Lou") at the Habima Theatre and in 2004, released her double album collection. She also wrote a children's book and took part in 2005–2006 in two musicals "צלילי המוסיקה" (Sound of Music) and "סינדרלה" (Cinderella). She also served as an assistant artistic director of an arts school in Haifa. She also had a number of hit singles and in 2011 took part in reality television program היכל התהילה (Hall of Fame), alongside a number of well-established Israeli singers on Channel 24.

== Private life ==
In 1978 she married Shlomo Zach, her manager and they had a son, Amit, born in 1979. In May 1987, the couple divorced after nine years of marriage. In 1988, Avital remarried businessman Shai Techmeier, and in 1993 had her second son, before she divorced again in 2001.

== Discography ==
=== Albums ===
- 1978: לאהוב אותך – Love you
- 1981: שלום חבר – Hello Friend
- 1981: זינוק – Leap
- 1985: רגעים – Moments
- 1987: בלי בושה – Shamelessly
- 1988: כיוונים נעלמים – Directions disappear
- 1990: ילד המחר – Tomorrow's Child
- 1993: אותך... פעם שנייה – You... Second time
- 1999: אילנה – תוצרת צרפת – Ilana – Made in France
- 2001: נוגעת באושר – Concerns in happiness

Various

- 1995: אוסף הזהב – Greatest Hits compilation, with some hits re-recorded
- 2004: סיכוי לאהבה – Chance of Love – double album collection of 1980s and 1990s hits.
- 2005: היי – Hey – a mini album with 7 remixes of earlier songs

== Filmography ==
Acting

- 2001: Laga'at Ba'osher as Levana Ezer (TV Series)
- 2001: City Tower as Dafna Sharon (TV Series)
- 2007: A Dangerous Dance as Mrs. Davidi
