= Bernadette (singer) =

Dutch singer

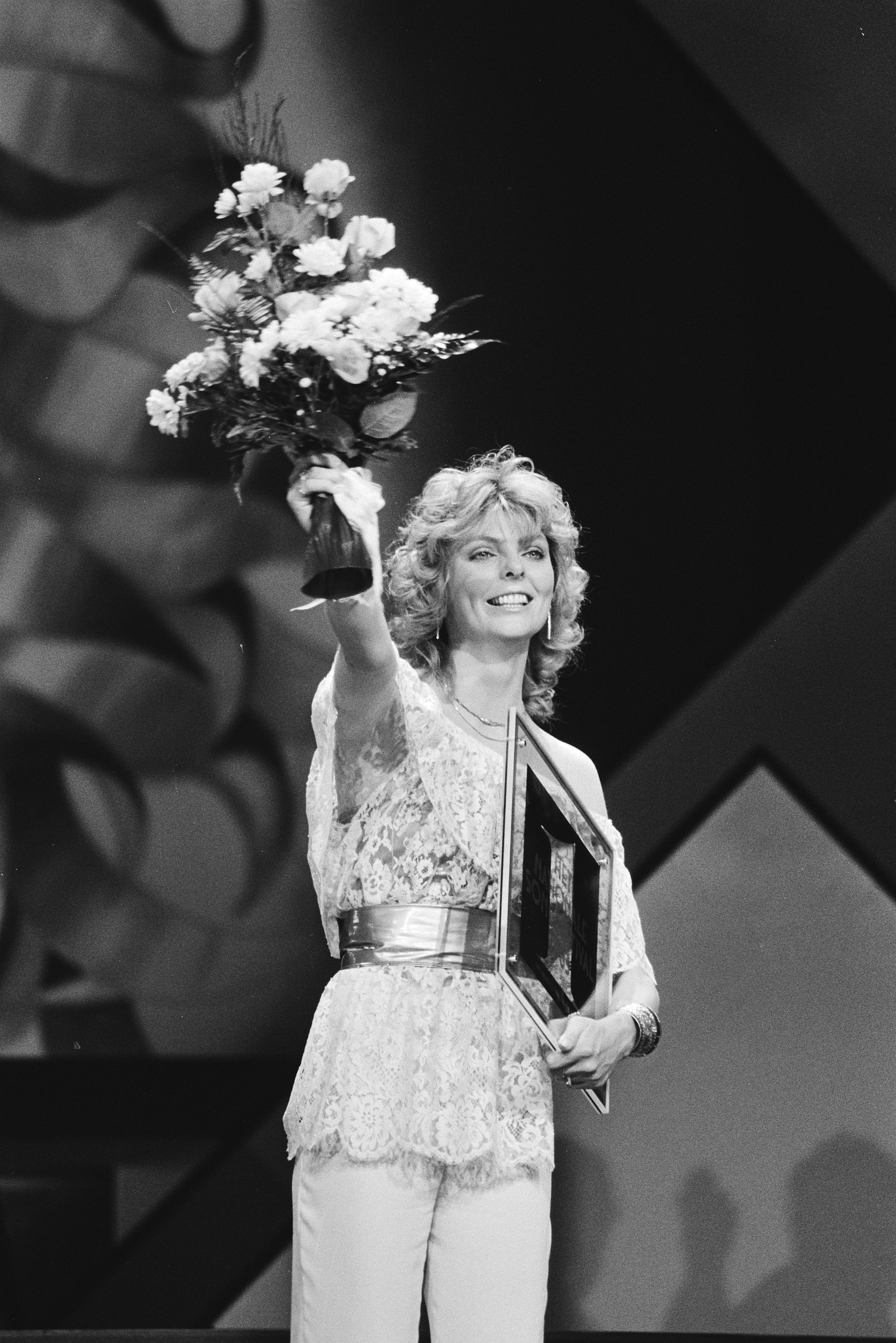
- Bernadette in 1983

Background information
- Born: Bernadette Kraakman; 1 March 1959 (age 66)
- Origin: Volendam, Netherlands
- Genres: Pop
- Occupation: Singer

Bernadette (born Bernadette Kraakman; 1 March 1959) is a Dutch singer, best known for her participation in the 1983 Eurovision Song Contest.

Bernadette was not a well-known name when she took part with two songs in the 1983 Dutch Eurovision selection, but she emerged the narrow victor (by just one point) with "Sing Me a Song", which despite the title was sung in Dutch. She went forward to the 28th Eurovision Song Contest, held in Munich on 23 April, where "Sing Me a Song" finished a solid seventh of the 20 entries.

Following her unsuccessful partnership with Ingrid Simons in the duo Double Trouble in 1986, Bernadette became a voiceover and backing singer, having worked with artists such as Harry Slinger and Rob de Nijs.

Bernadette was the voice of Snow White in the Dutch dubbing of Walt Disney's Snow White and the Seven Dwarfs and the Blue Fairy in the Dutch version of Pinocchio.

Awards and achievements
Preceded by Bill van Dijk with "Jij en ik"	Netherlands in the Eurovision Song Contest; 1983	Succeeded by Maribelle with "Ik hou van jou"
