= Ado Schlier =

German radio personality (1935–2026)

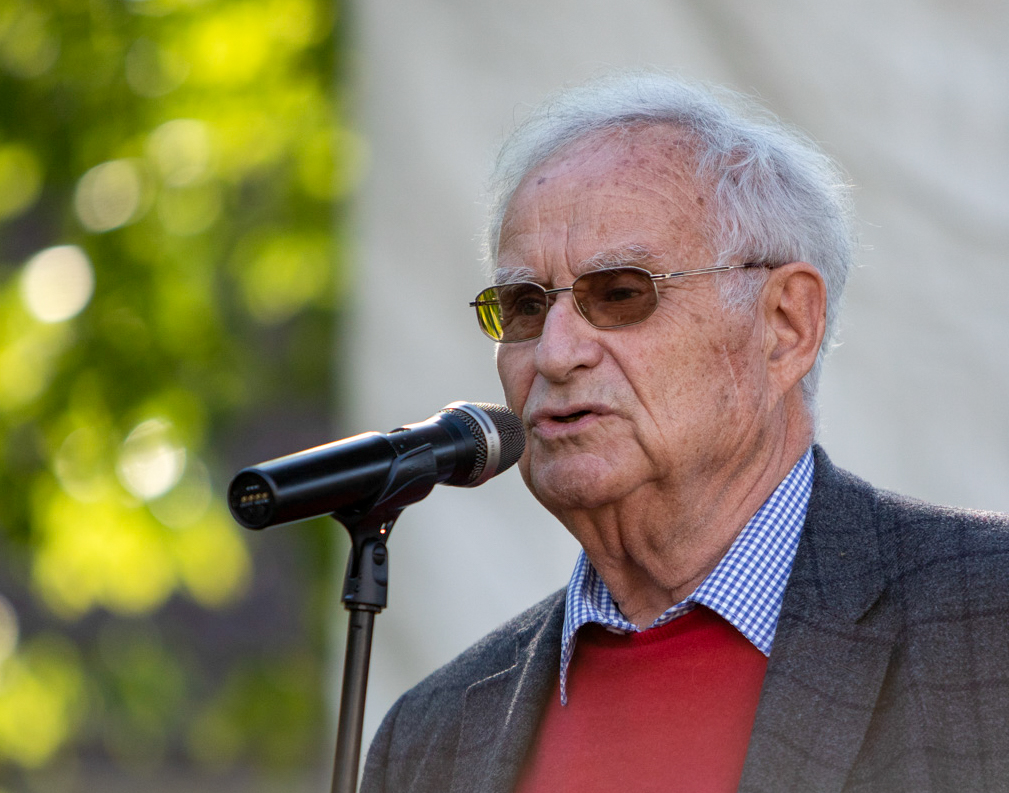
- Schlier in 2019
- Born: 31 January 1935; Würzburg, Gau Main Franconia, Germany
- Died: 14 January 2026 (aged 90); Würzburg, Bavaria, Germany
- Occupation: Radio personality

Ado Schlier (31 January 1935 – 14 January 2026) was a German radio personality.

In 1963, Schlier organized the Münchner Jazztage, a jazz festival which lasted one week and sold out the congress hall in the Deutsches Museum. He was notably the director of the music festival Songs an einem Sommerabend from 1987 to 2016. On the radio, he was a longtime personality for Radio Salzburg and Bayerischer Rundfunk.

Schlier died in Würzburg on 14 January 2026, at the age of 90.
