= Ami Aspelund =

Finnish singer (born 1953)

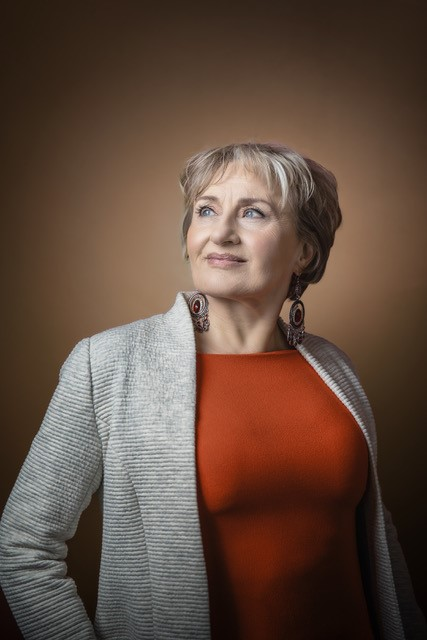
- Ami Aspelund in 2023

Background information
- Born: Anne-Marie Aspelund; 7 September 1953 (age 72); Vaasa, Finland
- Years active: 1973–present
- Website: amiaspelund.com

Ami Aspelund (born Anne-Marie Aspelund on 7 September 1953) is a Finnish singer. She is the younger sister of singer Monica Aspelund.

== Career ==
Born in Vaasa, Ami Aspelund released her first single in 1973 called "Apinamies", which is a Finnish version of Jungle Jim's "Big Fat Orang Uman".

Aspelund participated in the Rostock Festival in 1981, and in the Eurovision Song Contest 1983 with the song "Fantasiaa" ("Fantasy", music by Kari Kuusamo and lyrics by Kaisu Liuhala) finishing in 11th place with 41 points. In 1985, she entered the Knokke Song Contest.

Her debut album was published in 1974 and she has published many albums, sung both in Finnish and in her native language Swedish.

== Discography ==
=== Albums ===
- Ami (1974)
- Credo – minä uskon (1975)
- Karibu (1975)
- Yön jälkeen (1976)
- Cascade (1976)
- Fågel blå (1978)
- Sinilintu (1978)
- Tänään huipulla (1982)
- Fantasy dream (1983)
- Framtidens skugga (1983)
- Fenor och vingar (1986)
- Rio Herne (1994)
- Sylvian paluu (1997)
- Sylvias återkomst (1996)
- 20 suosikkia tänään huipulla (2000)
- Ami Live! (2005)
- Pärlor (2005)
- På resa! (2008)

=== Singles ===
- "Apinamies" / "Bumerangi" (1973)
- "Waterloo" / "Kun pois hän on" (1974)
- "Tänään huipulla" / "Tiedä mitä tahdot" (1974)
- "Mä halusin niin" / "Suukkosuma" (1975)
- "Päivä kaunein on tullut" / "Nuoruuteni on ohi" (1975)
- "Koska sun taas nähdä saan" / "Ja rakastan vielä" (1975)
- "Chanson d'amour" / "Onnen hetket" (1977)
- "Vapaana" / "Ihmeiden aika" (1977)
- "Sinilintu" / "Charleston" (1978)
- "Fågel blå" / "Charleston" (1978)
- "Fågel blau" / "Der erste Flug" (1982)
- "Mitt äppelträd" / "Fågel blå" (1982)
- "You are my life" (Ami Aspelund ja Jokke Seppälä) / "Flight 205" (Jokke Seppälä) (1982)
- "Rakkaudesta ystävyyteen" / "Tahtoo lisää" (1983)
- "Fantasiaa" / "Fantasy dream" (1983)
- "Clown" / "Private secretary" (1983)

Preceded by Kojo with Nuku pommiin	Finland in the Eurovision Song Contest; 1983	Succeeded by Kirka with Hengaillaan
