= Per Lucia =

1983 song by Riccardo Fogli

Single by Riccardo Fogli
- Language: Italian
- Released: 1983
- Label: CDG
- Composer: Maurizio Fabrizio
- Lyricists: Riccardo Fogli; Vincenzo Spampinato

Eurovision Song Contest 1983 entry
- Country: Italy
- Artist: Riccardo Fogli
- Language: Italian
- Composer: Maurizio Fabrizio
- Lyricists: Riccardo Fogli; Vincenzo Spampinato
- Conductor: Maurizio Fabrizio

Finals performance
- Final result: 11th
- Final points: 41

Entry chronology
- ◄ "Non so che darei" (1980)
- "I treni di Tozeur" (1984) ►

"Per Lucia" (Italian pronunciation: [per luˈtʃiːa]; "For Lucia") is a song recorded by Italian singer Riccardo Fogli with music composed by Maurizio Fabrizio and Italian lyrics written by Vincenzo Spampinato and Fogli himself. It represented Italy in the Eurovision Song Contest 1983 held in Munich.

== Background ==
=== Conception ===
"Per Lucia" was composed by Maurizio Fabrizio with Italian lyrics by Vincenzo Spampinato and Riccardo Fogli. It is a ballad, with the singer singing about the lengths he wants to go to in order to impress Lucia, his lover. He claims at one point, for example, that he wants to make a feast for the entire country.

=== Selection ===
Radiotelevisione italiana (RAI) internally selected "Per Lucia" performed by Fogli as it entrant for the 28th edition of the Eurovision Song Contest. Fogli had already achieved overwhelming popularity in Italy and Spanish-language countries, and his victory at the Sanremo Music Festival the previous year made it spread worldwide.

After its selection, they decided to release a greatest hits album including the Eurovision entry, "Storie di tutti i giorni (Sanremo 1982's winning song), and the hits from his last four studio albums at the time: "Che ne sai" (1979), "Alla fine di un lavoro" (1980), "Campione" (1981) and "Compagnia" (1982). This compilation was released in Scandinavia and Greece and reached number 20 on the Finnish album charts in June 1983.

Fogli also recorded an English-language version of the song, titled "For Lucia", which was released as a promo single.

=== Eurovision ===
On 23 April 1983, the Eurovision Song Contest was held at the Rudi-Sedlmayer-Halle in Munich hosted by Bayerischer Rundfunk (BR) on behalf of ARD and broadcast live throughout the continent. Fogli performed "Per Lucia" fifth on the evening, following Sweden's "Främling" by Carola Häggkvist and preceding Turkey's "Opera" by Çetin Alp & The Short Waves. Fabrizio conducted the event's live orchestra in the performance of the Italian entry.

At the close of voting, it had received 41 points, placing eleventh in a field of twenty. It was succeeded as Italian entry at the 1984 contest by "I treni di Tozeur" by Alice & Battiato.

== Charts ==
Charts (1983)	Peak position
Finland (The Official Finnish Charts)	17
Germany (Official German Charts)	63
Italy (FIMI)	38

Year-end Charts (1983)	Position
Finland (The Official Finnish Charts)	75

== Legacy ==
=== Covers ===
- Swedish dansband Wizex covered the song on the 1983 album Julie as "Här är sången" ("Here is the song") with lyrics in Swedish by Monica Forsberg.
- There are two Finnish-language cover versions of the song: "Kirje sulle" ("A letter to you"), written by Raul Reiman and recorded by Katri Helena, and "Vielä kerran kaikki muuttuu" ("Everything changes once more"), written by Turkka Mali and recorded by Jonna Tervomaa.
- A Croatian cover version, "Tebi Lucija", was sung by Slovenian singer Oto Pestner and released after the contest for the compilation album Evrovizijske melodije 2, due to the popularity of Eurovision in Yugoslavia.
