= Si la vie est cadeau =

1983 song by Corinne Hermès

Single by Corinne Hermès
- Language: French
- B-side: "Pour un jour de toi"
- Released: 2 May 1983
- Recorded: 1983
- Genre: Chanson
- Length: 3:05
- Label: Polydor Records; PolyGram Music; Saban Records
- Composer: Jean-Pierre Millers
- Lyricist: Alain Garcia
- Producer: Jean-Pierre Millers

Corinne Hermès singles chronology
"Le Blouson gris" (1979)	"Si la vie est cadeau" (1983)	"Vivre à deux" (1983)

Eurovision Song Contest 1983 entry
- Country: Luxembourg
- Artist: Corinne Hermès
- Language: French
- Composer: Jean-Pierre Millers
- Lyricist: Alain Garcia
- Conductor: Michel Bernholc

Finals performance
- Final result: 1st
- Final points: 142

Entry chronology
- ◄ "Cours après le temps" (1982)
- "100% d'amour" (1984) ►

Official performance video
- "Si la vie est cadeau" on YouTube

"Si la vie est cadeau" (French pronunciation: [si la vi ɛ kado]; "If Life Is a Gift") is a song recorded by French singer Corinne Hermès with music composed by Jean-Pierre Millers and French lyrics written by Alain Garcia. It represented Luxembourg in the Eurovision Song Contest 1983 held in Munich, resulting in the country's last win to date at the contest.

== Background ==
=== Conception ===
"Si la vie est cadeau" was composed by Jean-Pierre Millers with French lyrics by Alain Garcia. It is a dramatic ballad dealing with the wonder of life, likening it to a gift. The lyrics tell of the singer's suffering in love with a man "who promised [her] the whole world" and did not follow through: "what about the child I wanted to give to you in the spring?". She then sings that any kind of gift is welcome, whether it be given, stolen or returned, and warns that the good times are too short, implying that the listener should savor them for all they are worth.

Corinne Hermès recorded the song in French, English –as "Words of Love"–, and German –as "Liebe gibt und nimmt"–.

=== Eurovision ===
The Compagnie Luxembourgeoise de Télédiffusion (CLT) internally selected "Si la vie est cadeau" performed by Hermès as its entrant for the 28th edition of the Eurovision Song Contest.

On 23 April 1983, the Eurovision Song Contest was held at the Rudi-Sedlmayer-Halle in Munich hosted by Bayerischer Rundfunk (BR) on behalf of ARD and broadcast live throughout the continent. Hermès performed "Si la vie est cadeau" twentieth and last on the evening, following Belgium's "Rendez-vous" by Pas de Deux. Michel Bernholc conducted the event's live orchestra in the performance of the Luxembourgian entry.

At the close of voting, it had received 142 points, placing first in a field of twenty, winning the contest. This win brought Luxembourg equal with France on five contest wins each, however both countries would later be eclipsed by Ireland and Sweden, which would win seven times each. It is also Luxembourg's last win to date at the contest. It was succeeded in 1984 as winner by "Diggi-Loo Diggi-Ley" performed by Herreys representing Sweden. It was succeeded as Luxembourgian entrant in 1984 by "100% d'amour" by Sophie Carle.

== Commercial performance ==
Compared to the previous years' Eurovision winners, "Si la vie est cadeau" proved to be only a moderate commercial success, peaking at #2 in France; #3 in Belgium; #12 in Ireland; #13 in Sweden; #14 in Switzerland; #31 in the Netherlands, #67 in Germany, #89 in the UK and failing to chart in most other European countries.

== Legacy ==
The Finnish rendering "Lahjan sain" was recorded by Lea Laven being the title cut of her 1983 album release.

Preceded by "Ein bißchen Frieden" by Nicole	Eurovision Song Contest winners 1983	Succeeded by "Diggi-Loo Diggi-Ley" by Herreys
