= Netherlands in the Eurovision Song Contest 1975 =

- Eurovision Song Contest 1975
- Participating broadcaster: Nederlandse Omroep Stichting (NOS)
- Country: Netherlands
- Selection process: Nationaal Songfestival 1975
- Selection date: 26 February 1975

Competing entry
- Song: "Ding-a-dong"
- Artist: Teach-In
- Songwriters: Dick Bakker; Will Luikinga; Eddy Ouwens

Placement
- Final result: 1st, 152 points

Participation chronology

The Netherlands was represented at the Eurovision Song Contest 1975 with the song "Ding-a-dong", composed by Dick Bakker, with lyrics by Will Luikinga and Eddy Ouwens, and performed by six-member group Teach-In. The Dutch participating broadcaster, Nederlandse Omroep Stichting (NOS), selected its entry through a national final. The entry eventually won the Eurovision Song Contest.

== Before Eurovision ==
=== Nationaal Songfestival 1975 ===
Nederlandse Omroep Stichting (NOS) held the national final at the Jaarbeurs in Utrecht, hosted by Willem Duys. For the first time since 1970, the performer had not been preselected by the broadcaster, and the 1975 selection consisted of two stages. Firstly, each of the three participating acts performed a song and 5-member international jury voted for the best song; then the chosen song was performed by all three acts and a 100-member public jury voted for the act they wanted to perform it. Teach-In were chosen with over half of the public vote.

Song selection – 26 February 1975
R/O	Song	Points	Place
1	"Ik heb geen geld voor de trein"	1	2
2	"Dinge dong"	4	1
3	"Circus"	0	3

Performer selection – 26 February 1975
R/O	Artist	Points	Place
1	Albert West	33	2
2	Teach-In	56	1
3	Debbie	11	3

== At Eurovision ==
The free-language rule applied in 1975, so prior to the contest the song was translated into English as "Ding-a-dong" and performed in English at the final. On the evening of the final Teach-In performed first in the running order, preceding Ireland. 1975 saw the introduction of the current Eurovision scoring system, and "Ding-a-dong" received six maximum 12 points votes from Israel, Malta, Norway, Spain, Sweden, and the United Kingdom. At the close of voting it had received 152 points in total (with points from every other participating country), winning the contest by a 14-point margin over runners-up the United Kingdom. This was the fourth Eurovision victory for the Netherlands. The Dutch jury awarded its 12 points to Luxembourg.

The Dutch conductor at the contest was Harry van Hoof.

This was the first time in Eurovision history that the contest was won by the song which had opened the show, though this would happen again with the United Kingdom the following year and Sweden in 1984.

"Ding-a-dong" reached number 3 on the Dutch Singles chart and also became a hit in several other markets, including the United Kingdom where it peaked at number 13, and Sweden where it made number 2.

=== Voting ===
Points awarded to the Netherlands
Score	Country
12 points	Israel; Malta; Norway; Spain; Sweden; United Kingdom
10 points	Finland; Luxembourg; Monaco
8 points	Germany; Ireland; Yugoslavia
7 points	Portugal
6 points	Switzerland
5 points	France
4 points	Turkey
3 points	Belgium
2 points	
1 point	Italy

Points awarded by the Netherlands
Score	Country
12 points	Luxembourg
10 points	Israel
8 points	France
7 points	Switzerland
6 points	Ireland
5 points	Belgium
4 points	United Kingdom
3 points	Yugoslavia
2 points	Norway
1 point	Malta
