= Germany in the Eurovision Song Contest 1975 =

- Eurovision Song Contest 1975
- Participating broadcaster: ARD (Note: Arbeitsgemeinschaft der öffentlich-rechtlichen Rundfunkanstalten der Bundesrepublik Deutschland) – Hessischer Rundfunk (HR)
- Country: Germany
- Selection process: Ein Lied für Stockholm
- Selection date: 3 February 1975

Competing entry
- Song: "Ein Lied kann eine Brücke sein"
- Artist: Joy Fleming
- Songwriters: Rainer Pietsch; Michael Holm

Placement
- Final result: 17th, 15 points

Participation chronology

Germany was represented at the Eurovision Song Contest 1975 with the song "Ein Lied kann eine Brücke sein", composed by Rainer Pietsch, with lyrics by Michael Holm, and performed by Joy Fleming. The German participating broadcaster on behalf of ARD, Hessischer Rundfunk (HR), selected their entry through a national final.

== Before Eurovision ==
=== Ein Lied für Stockholm ===
Hessischer Rundfunk (HR) held the national final, Vorentscheid 1975: Ein Lied für Stockholm, on 3 February at its Studio 1 in Frankfurt am Main, hosted by journalist Karin Tietze-Ludwig, already well known for hosting the international preview Auftakt für Brighton a year before.

Fifteen songs made it to the national final, which was broadcast by HR to ARD broadcasters across West Germany. The winner was decided by nine regional juries with four members each. Each jury member would assign points 1 to 5 for their five favorite songs. The highest score a song could receive (with every jury member from every region voting 5 on one song) was 180.

The winning entry was "Ein Lied kann eine Brücke sein", performed by Joy Fleming and composed by Reiner Pietsch with lyrics by Michael Holm. Other notable competitors included 1971 Contest winner Séverine, two-time German representative Katja Ebstein, past German representative Mary Roos, and Peggy March, well known in Germany and briefly in the U.S. for the song "I Will Follow Him".

R/O	Artist	Song	Songwriters	Points	Place
1	Marianne Rosenberg	"Er gehört zu mir"	Joachim Heider; Christian Heilburg	86	10
2	Peggy March	"Alles geht vorüber"	Ralph Siegel; Kurt Hertha	128	2
3	Peter Horton	"Am Fuß der Leiter"	Günter Ress; Miriam Frances	79	11
4	Die Jokers	"San Francisco Symphony"	Peter Martin; Werner Schüler	57	12
5	Séverine	"Dreh dich im Kreisel der Zeit"	Peter Orloff; Elisabeth Bertram	97	7
6	Joy Fleming	"Ein Lied kann eine Brücke sein"	Rainer Pietsch; Michael Holm	134	1
7	Maggie Mae	"Die total verrückte Zeit"	Henry Meier; Georg Buschor	97	7
8	Werner W. Becker	"Heut' bin ich arm, heut' bin ich reich"	Klaus Munro; Werner W. Becker	54	13
9	Mary Roos	"Eine Liebe ist wie ein Lied"	Hans Blum; Ingetraut Blum	115	3
10	Ricci Hohlt	"Du"	Chris Juwens; Joachim Relin	38	14
11	Ricky Gordon	"Sonja, ich rufe dich"	Rudi Edelmann; Angie Richter	37	15
12	Jürgen Marcus	"Ein Lied zieht hinaus in die Welt"	Jack White; Fred Jay	90	9
13	Love Generation	"Hör wieder Radio"	Peter Schirmann; Gisela Kieler	115	3
14	Katja Ebstein	"Ich liebe dich"	Christian Bruhn; Michael Kunze	110	5
15	Shuki and Aviva	"Du und ich und zwei Träume"	Rainer Maria Erhardt; Jean Frankfurter	108	6

== At Eurovision ==
Joy Fleming performed fourth on the night of the contest, following France and preceding Luxembourg. At the close of the voting the song had received 15 points, placing 17th in a field of 19 competing countries. It was the lowest ranking Germany had seen in the competition to this point, and would continue to hold the distinction of having the lowest ranking out of all the German Eurovision songs until 1991, when the German entry that year placed 18th. Joy Fleming later blamed her clothing and apparel for the low placement. She stated that she would have preferred wearing trousers but that Hans-Otto Grünefeldt, entertainment program director of HR, forced her to wear a green dress and fake pearls instead.

=== Voting ===
Points awarded to Germany
Score	Country
12 points	
10 points	
8 points	Luxembourg
7 points	
6 points	
5 points	
4 points	Spain
3 points	Malta
2 points	
1 point	

Points awarded by Germany
Score	Country
12 points	Finland
10 points	United Kingdom
8 points	Netherlands
7 points	Belgium
6 points	Switzerland
5 points	Spain
4 points	Italy
3 points	Monaco
2 points	Yugoslavia
1 point	Israel
