= Ding-a-dong =

1975 song by Teach-In

- French 7" single cover

Single by Teach-In

from the album Festival
- B-side: "Let Me In"
- Released: 1975
- Label: Philips
- Composer: Dick Bakker
- Lyricists: Will Luikinga; Eddy Ouwens

Music video
- "Dinge-dong" on YouTube on TopPop

Eurovision Song Contest 1975 entry
- Country: Netherlands
- Artists: Getty Kaspers; Ard Weeink; Chris de Wolde; John Gaasbeek; Koos Versteeg; Rudi Nijhuis
- As: Teach-In
- Language: English
- Composer: Dick Bakker
- Lyricists: Will Luikinga; Eddy Ouwens
- Conductor: Harry van Hoof

Finals performance
- Final result: 1st
- Final points: 152

Entry chronology
- ◄ "I See a Star" (1974)
- "The Party's Over" (1976) ►

Official performance video
- "Ding-a-dong" on YouTube

"Ding-a-dong" is a song recorded by Dutch band Teach-In, with music composed by Dick Bakker and lyrics written by Will Luikinga and Eddy Ouwens. It represented the Netherlands in the Eurovision Song Contest 1975, held in Stockholm, winning the contest. It reached number 1 in both the Swiss and the Norwegian Singles Chart. Teach-In recorded the song in English, Dutch, and German.

== Background ==
=== Conception ===
"Ding-a-dong" was composed by Dick Bakker with lyrics by Will Luikinga and Eddy Ouwens. It is an up-tempo ode to positive thought though the song is written entirely in a minor key. It sings that one should "sing a song that goes ding ding-a-dong" when one is feeling unhappy, with the chorus proclaiming "Ding-a-dong every hour, when you pick a flower. Even when your lover is gone, gone, gone."

In the original Dutch version the "ding-a-dong" describes the heartbeat of the singer remembering the separation from her lover in the past. As well as "ding-a-dong", the lyrics also contain "bim-bam-bom" representing a fearful heartbeat and "tikke-(tikke)-tak" for the ticking of the clock while waiting for the lover to return.

=== Eurovision ===
On 26 February 1975, "Dinge dong" –the original Dutch version of "Ding-a-dong"– competed in the 19th edition of the Nationaal Songfestival, the national final organized by Nederlandse Omroep Stichting (NOS) to select its song and performer for the 20th edition of the Eurovision Song Contest. The song won the three-song competition, so it became the Dutch entry for Eurovision. Once selected, it was performed by the three competing acts: Albert West, Debbie, and Teach-In. Teach-In received more points than their rivals, so they became the performers for Eurovision. Teach-In then recorded the song in Dutch –as "Dinge-dong"–, English –as Ding-a-dong–, and German –as "Ding ding-a-dong".

On 22 March 1975, the Eurovision Song Contest was held at Sankt Eriks-Mässan in Stockholm hosted by Sveriges Radio (SR), and broadcast live throughout the continent. Teach-In performed in English "Ding-a-dong" (Note: During broadcast, it was introduced in the onscreen titles as "Ding dinge dong") first on the evening preceding Ireland's "That's What Friends Are For" by The Swarbriggs. Harry van Hoof conducted the live orchestra in the performance of the Dutch entry.

At the close of voting, it had received 152 points, placing first in a field of nineteen, winning the contest. The song was the first winner under the current Eurovision voting system whereby each country awards scores of 1–8, 10, and 12.

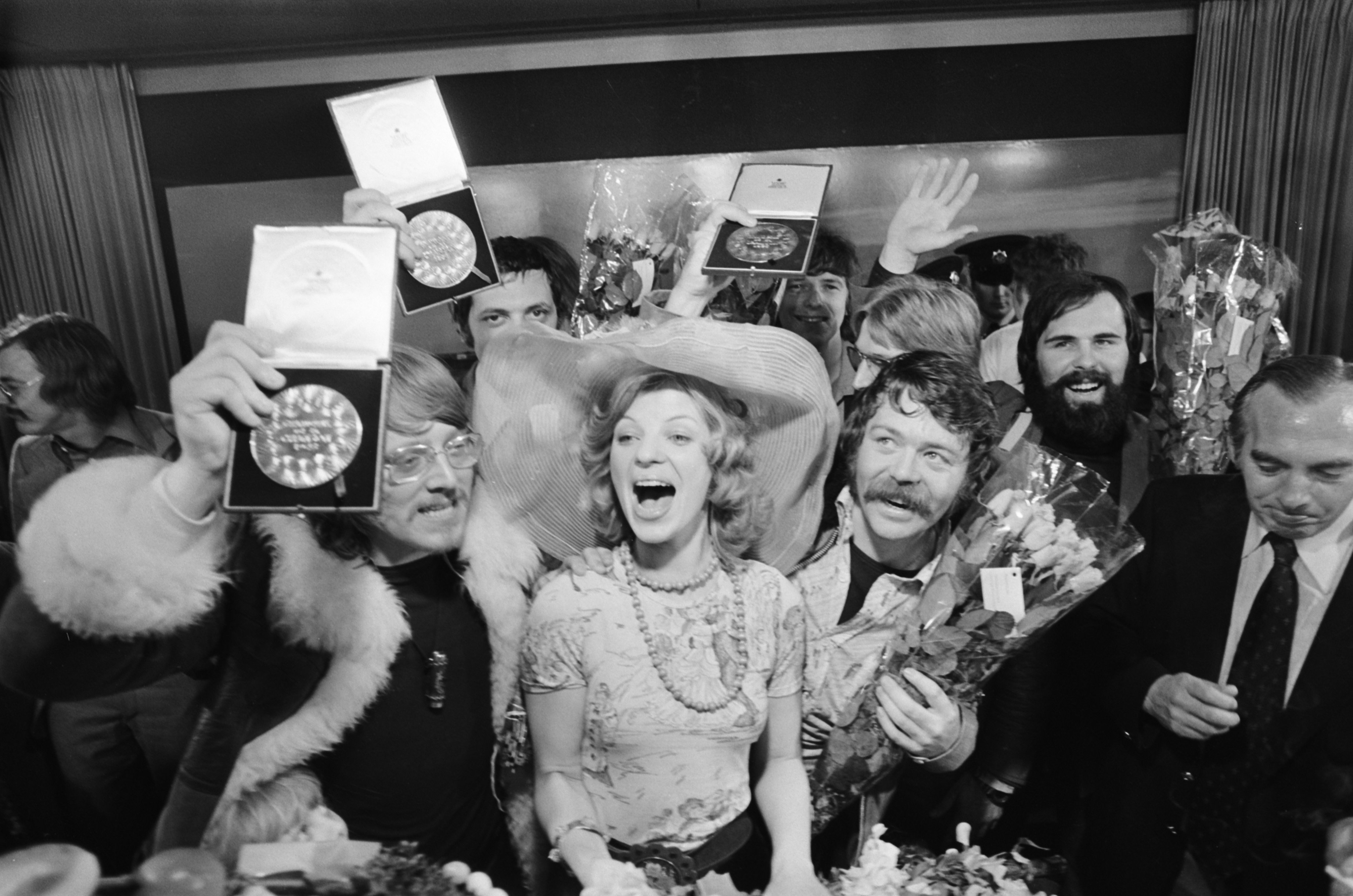
Teach-In and the songwriters arriving at Schiphol Airport after Eurovision.

"Ding-a-dong" was notable for being one of the Eurovision winners that had quirky or entirely nonsensical titles or lyrics, following in the footsteps of Massiel's "La, la, la" in 1968 and Lulu's "Boom Bang-a-Bang" in 1969, and later followed by the Herreys' "Diggi-Loo Diggi-Ley" in 1984. As the first song was performed during the evening, the victory ran contrary to the fact that success usually went to songs performed later in the broadcast. This was the first of three occasions when the first song would win the contest, the second coming the following year in 1976, and the third in 1984.

=== Aftermath ===
Teach-In performed their song in the Eurovision twenty-fifth anniversary show Songs of Europe held on 22 August 1981 in Mysen. On 22 May 2021, the interval act "Rock the Roof" in the Eurovision Song Contest 2021 grand final featured "Ding-a-dong" performed by Teach-In.

== Chart history ==
=== Weekly charts ===
Chart (1975)	Peak position
Australia (Kent Music Report)	64
Belgium (Ultratop 50 Flanders)	2
Belgium (Ultratop 50 Wallonia)	7
Germany (GfK)	9
Ireland (IRMA)	8
Netherlands (Dutch Top 40)	3
Netherlands (Single Top 100)	3
Norway (VG-lista)	1
Switzerland (Schweizer Hitparade)	1
UK Singles (OCC)	13
US Adult Contemporary (Billboard)	22

=== Year-end charts ===
Chart (1975)	Position
Belgium (Ultratop 50 Flanders)	54
France (IFOP)	29
Switzerland (Schweizer Hitparade)	13

== Legacy ==
=== beFour cover ===
"Ding-A-Dong"

Single by beFour

from the album Friends 4 Ever
- Released: 17 April 2009
- Recorded: 2009
- Genre: Pop
- Length: 3:32
- Songwriters: Will Luikinga, Eddy Ouwens

BeFour singles chronology
"No Limit" (2009)	"Ding-A-Dong" (2009)

"Ding-a-Dong" was also recorded by German band beFour for their fourth studio album Friends 4 Ever and released on 17 April 2009 as its second single in Germany, Austria, and Switzerland.

==== Weekly charts ====
Chart (2009)	Peak position
Germany (GfK)	61

=== Other covers ===
- Edwyn Collins did a cover of the song for Eurotrash.
- Sarolta Zalatnay made the first Hungarian version in 1975.
- Russian musicians Alyona Apina and Murat Nasyrov recorded "Лунные ночи" ("Lunnyje nochi", "Moonlight nights") to the melody of "Ding-a-Dong" in 1997.
- Bessy Argyraki sang a cover in Greek, included in her LP Robert & Bessie (1975).
- Füsun Önal covered this song as "Söyleyin Arkadaşlar" ("Tell me friends") in Turkish, included in her first LP Alo... Ben Füsun (1975).
- Ayla Algan covered this song as "Dünya Tersine Dönse" ("If the world turns back") in Turkish, included in firstly her 45 rpm Dünya Tersine Dönse/Sen De Katıl Bize (1975), laterly in her second LP after Yunus Emre and the first commercial one Ayla Algan (1976).
- András Csonka recorded a Hungarian language version "Ding Dong" in 2001.
- Hanne recorded a Finnish language version "Ding-a-Dong" in 1975.
- The Dutch language television series, Schaep Ahoy, featured a version of the song sung by the cast members in its first episode in 2015.
- 1984 & Dana Winner released a dance/pop version on 8th November 2024.

== Notes ==
Preceded by "Waterloo" by ABBA	Eurovision Song Contest winners 1975	Succeeded by "Save Your Kisses for Me" by Brotherhood of Man
