= Ein Lied kann eine Brücke sein =

1975 song by Joy Fleming

Single by Joy Fleming
- Released: 1975
- Genre: Soul
- Length: 3:31
- Label: Atlantic
- Songwriters: Michael Holm; Rainer Pietsch
- Producer: Peter Kirsten

Eurovision Song Contest 1975 entry
- Country: Germany
- Artist: Joy Fleming
- Composer: Rainer Pietsch
- Lyricist: Michael Holm
- Conductor: Rainer Pietsch

Finals performance
- Final result: 17th
- Final points: 15

Entry chronology
- ◄ "Die Sommermelodie" (1974)
- "Sing Sang Song" (1976) ►

"Ein Lied kann eine Brücke sein" (German pronunciation: [aɪn ˈliːt kan ʔaɪnə ˈbʁʏkə zaɪn]; English: "A Song Can Be a Bridge") is a song performed by German singer Joy Fleming, which served as Germany's entry in the Eurovision Song Contest 1975 in Stockholm, Sweden. The soul-influenced song was composed by Rainer Pietsch, while the lyrics were written by singer Michael Holm, with Peter Kirsten overseeing its production. Lyrically, "Ein Lied kann eine Brücke sein" is an ode to the unifying force of music.

Following its win at Ein Lied für Stockholm, the German national final to select their entry, it finished in 17th in a field of 19 competing countries on the night of the Eurovision Song Contest, having received 15 points. It was the lowest ranking Germany had seen in the competition to this point. Commercially, "Ein Lied kann eine Brücke sein" became Fleming's highest-charting single, peaking at number 32 on the West German Singles Chart, as well as one of her signature songs along with "Neckarbrückenblues" (1971).

== Background ==
"Ein Lied kann eine Brücke sein" was written by Rainer Pietsch and Michael Holm, while production was helmed by Peter Kirsten. Put together by Pietsch during "months of meticulous work on the mixing desk," the song is a dramatic and soul influenced ballad, with Fleming singing that a song can be the means of changing oneself and reaching goals. Critics described the song "as three-minute cascade of nervously arranged tones, 180 seconds of tension, momentum and speed – enough space between the song's melodic lines to give Fleming room to really unpack the tube again for the final chorus." Holm later called the song an "arrangement masterpiece" and praised Fleming's "incomparable vocal power." Fleming also recorded the song in English, as "Bridge of Love," with English lyrics by Fred Jay.

== Ein Lied für Stockholm ==
On 3 February 1975, Fleming and "Ein Lied kann eine Brücke sein" participated in the national final to select Germany's entry for the Eurovision Song Contest 1975. Held at the Hessischer Rundfunk Studio 1 in Frankfurt am Main and hosted by journalist Karin Tietze-Ludwig, a line-up of well-known singers – also consisting of Mary Roos, Marianne Rosenberg, Jürgen Marcus, Peggy March, two-time German representative Katja Ebstein, and former ESC winner Séverine – led to what was declared an "extremely exciting race" in the preliminary round. "Ein Lied kann eine Brücke sein" was one out of fifteen songs that made it to the national final. The winner was decided by nine regional juries with four members each. Fleming eventually finished first, having earned tight 134 points of the jury vote over Peggy March's "Alles geht vorüber."

== Eurovision Song Contest ==
Fleming performed fourth on the night of the contest on 22 March 1975, following France's Nicole Rieu with "Et bonjour à toi l'artiste" and preceding Luxembourg's Géraldine with "Toi." On stage in Stockholm, she was backed by three British singers: Madeline Bell of Blue Mink and sisters Sue Glover and Sunny Leslie from vocal duo Sue and Sunny, all of which had previously provided backing at the contest or would participate in subsequent selection contest for Eurovision. Although not German speakers, the trio nevertheless sang the backing which included the last chorus performed in English. At the close of the voting the song had received 15 points, placing 17th in a field of 19 competing countries. It was the lowest ranking Germany had seen in the competition to this point, and would continue to hold the distinction of having the lowest ranking out of all the German Eurovision songs until 1991, when German entry Atlantis 2000 and their song "Dieser Traum darf niemals sterben" placed 18th that year.

Fleming later blamed her clothing and apparel for the low placement. In 2010, she stated that she would have preferred wearing trousers but that Hans-Otto Grünefeldt, entertainment program director of Hessischer Rundfunk, forced her to wear a green dress and fake pearls instead. Holm declared the song's performance in his 2023 biography Rückkehr nach Mendocino as a "complete crash, a blow to our ambitions" after he had been assured that "Ein Lied kann eine Brücke" was considered a "secret favorite during rehearsals for the show." He felt that composer Rainer Pietsch's "oversized ego" at that time as well as his unconventional and highly energetic count-in when he conducted the orchestra during Fleming's performance in Stockholm, had left a negative impression on the juries. Holm also noted that the song could have been too "pop" for the contest.

== Legacy ==
Despite its relatively low placing, "Ein Lied kann eine Brücke sein" has become something of a fan favourite, with the commemorative CDs released to coincide with the Congratulations: 50 Years of the Eurovision Song Contest special in late 2005 featuring it. It has also been covered by a wide range of other artists over the past five decades, including fellow German Eurovision participant Guildo Horn, as well as Czech singer Karel Gott, and Dutch singer Eloy de Jong. In 2002, the song gave the title to Eurovision historian Jan Feddersen's anthology Ein Lied kann eine Brücke sein: die Deutsche und Internationale Geschichte des Grand Prix Eurovision. In 2021, German online magazine laut.de ranked it second on their list of the best German Eurovision Song Contest entries, calling it a "masterpiece," while citing its placement as "a disgrace."

Fleming's career remained unharmed by the song's failure. In the German media, the placing of "Ein Lied kann eine Brücke sein" on the night of the contest was perceived as unfair, and Fleming somewhat benefited from the image of having been shortchanged during the contest. In 1986, she made a further Eurovision bid, participating in Ein Lied für Bergen, the German national contest, with the song "Miteinander," a duet with singer Marc Berry, finishing fourth. Fleming made two further attempts in 2001 and in 2002, this time performing "Power of Trust" with singers Lesley Bogaert and Brigitte Oelke and "Joy to the World" with the group Jambalaya, respectively. Both songs finished as runner-up. In 2023, Holm disclosed that American singer Frank Sinatra recorded a yet-unreleased version of "Bridge of Love" for one his albums.

== Track listings ==
All tracks produced by Peter Kirsten.

7" single
No.	Title	Writer(s)	Length
1.	"Ein Lied kann eine Brücke sein"	Michael Holm; Rainer Pietsch	3:31
2.	"Die Nacht zeigt nicht jedem ihr Gesicht"	Holm; Pietsch	3:46

7" single
No.	Title	Writer(s)	Length
1.	"Bridge of Love" (Ein Lied kann eine Brücke sein)	Fred Jay; Holm; Pietsch	3:31
2.	"Divorcee"	Jerry Rix; Pete Bellotte; Ralf Nowy	2:47

== Credits and personnel ==
Credits lifted from the liner notes of "Ein Lied kann eine Brücke sein."

- Joy Fleming – vocalist
- Michael Holm – writer
- Peter Kirsten – producer
- Rainer Pietsch – writer

== Charts ==
Weekly chart performance for "Ein Lied kann eine Brücke sein"
Chart (1975)	Peak position
West Germany (GfK)	32

Preceded by "Die Sommermelodie" by Cindy & Bert	Germany in the Eurovision Song Contest; 1975	Succeeded by "Sing Sang Song" by Les Humphries Singers
