= Malta in the Eurovision Song Contest 1975 =

- Eurovision Song Contest 1975
- Participating broadcaster: Maltese Broadcasting Authority (MBA)
- Country: Malta
- Selection process: Song for Europe 1975
- Selection date: 5 February 1975

Competing entry
- Song: "Singing This Song"
- Artist: Renato
- Songwriters: Sammy Galea; M. Iris Mifsud

Placement
- Final result: 12th, 32 points

Participation chronology

Malta was represented at the Eurovision Song Contest 1975 with the song "Singing This Song", composed by Sammy Galea, with lyrics by M. Iris Mifsud, and performed by Renato. The Maltese participating broadcaster, the Maltese Broadcasting Authority (MBA), selected its entry for the contest through a national final.

== Before Eurovision ==
=== National selection ===
Song for Europe 1975 was the national final format developed by the Maltese Broadcasting Authority (MBA) which determined the song that would represent Malta at the Eurovision Song Contest 1975. The competition consisted of two parts. The first part was the Malta Song Festival 1975, where the top 5 songs would then go on to the Song for Europe contest. The two contests were organised by two separate organisations; the Malta Song Festival was organised by the Malta Song Festival Board, while Song for Europe was organised by MBA. The use of Malta Song Festival as part of the Maltese national final was a cooperation between the two organisations, this led to the broadcaster not actually being in control of the songs in its own national final. It was decided to send a song in English for the Eurovision Song Contest 1975 as the MBA believed that the Maltese language was one of the reasons for their last place finishes in 1971 and 1972

==== Competing entries ====
The Malta Song Festival Board opened submission period for songs from late November 1974 until 20 December 1974, which was later extended to 28 December 1974. The Malta Song Festival Board shortlisted 12 artists which composers could pick from to perform their songs: Edwin Galea, Mary Rose Mallia, Mary Spiteri, Renato, The Greenfields, Victoria Briffa, John Lucas, Enzo Guzman, Joe Cutajar, Joe Agius, Joe Bugeja, and Bayzo.

Competing entries
Artist	Song		Songwriter(s)	
Artist	Maltese Title	English title	Composer	Lyricist
Bayzo	"Bejn lejl u nhar"	"Adorable You"	Edmond Barbara	Clemente Zammit
Edwin Galea	"Kantaw ilkoll flimkien"	"Try and Try Again"	Edward Briffa	
Mary Spiteri	"Id fid"	"Try a Little Love Today"	Victor Fenech	Mary Morey Micallef
Mary Spiteri	"Rokna minn qalbi"	"Live for Tomorrow"	Paul Abela	Mary Sant
Mary Rose Mallia	"Il-loghba tal-imħabba"	"Love Is a Gamble"	Carmen Zammit	
Mary Rose Mallia	"Min jaf"	"Fly Away Little Bird"	Messina Galea	Marie Therese Stevens
Renato	"Dinja gdida"	"A New World"	Joe Ellul	
Renato	"Idhaq u iccajta"	"Singing This Song"	Sammy Galea	M. Louise MiFsud
The Greenfields	"Imħabba għal xulxin"	"Love for You and Me"	Charles Bajada	
The Greenfields	"L-ghanja tal-imħabba"	"Sing a Song of Love"	Charles Mifsud	Charles Bajada

==== Malta Song Festival 1975 ====
Malta Song Festival 1975 was held on 1 February 1975 at the Alhambra Theatre. All songs were sung twice, once in Maltese and then again in English, and the top five qualified to Song for Europe 1975.

R/O	Artist	Song		Result
R/O	Artist	Maltese Title	English title	Result
1	The Greenfields	"Imħabba għal xulxin"	"Love for You and Me"	—N/a
2	Bayzo	"Bejn lejl u nhar"	"Adorable You"	—N/a
3	Mary Spiteri	"Rokna minn qalbi"	"Live for Tomorrow"	Qualified
4	Renato	"Dinja gdida"	"A New World"	Qualified
5	Mary Spiteri	"Id fid"	"Try a Little Love Today"	Qualified
6	Mary Rose Mallia	"Min jaf"	"Fly Away Little Bird"	—N/a
7	Renato	"Idhaq u iccajta"	"Singing This Song"	Qualified
8	Mary Rose Mallia	"Il-loghba tal-imħabba"	"Love Is a Gamble"	—N/a
9	The Greenfields	"L-ghanja tal-imħabba"	"Sing a Song of Love"	Qualified
10	Edwin Galea	"Kantaw ilkoll flimkien"	"Try and Try Again"	—N/a

==== Song for Europe 1975 ====
Song for Europe 1975 was held on 5 February 1975 at the MBA studios. The voting was done by 2 separate juries; a 20-member jury consisting of 20 members of the public, 2 from each of Malta's electoral districts, who each gave 1 point to a song of their choice; and an 8-member jury consisting of 7 international juries and a Maltese jury, who each gave 6 points to their favourite song, 3 points to their second favourite, and 1 point to their third favourite.

R/O	Artist	Song	Points	Place
1	Mary Spiteri	"Live for Tomorrow"	35	2
2	Renato	"A New World"	3	5
3	The Greenfields	"Sing a Song of Love"	8	4
4	Mary Spiteri	"Try a Little Love Today"	12	3
5	Renato	"Singing This Song"	42	1

== At Eurovision ==
On the night of the final Renato performed tenth in the running order, following United Kingdom and preceding Belgium. At the close of voting "Singing This Song" had received 32 points, getting 12th place.

The Maltese conductor at the contest was Vince Tempera.

=== Voting ===
Points awarded to Malta
Score	Country
12 points	
10 points	
8 points	France
7 points	Belgium
6 points	
5 points	Luxembourg
4 points	Switzerland
3 points	
2 points	Norway; Yugoslavia; Turkey
1 point	Netherlands; Israel

Points awarded by Malta
Score	Country
12 points	Netherlands
10 points	Italy
8 points	United Kingdom
7 points	France
6 points	Switzerland
5 points	Luxembourg
4 points	Ireland
3 points	Germany
2 points	Sweden
1 point	Monaco
