= United Kingdom in the Eurovision Song Contest 1975 =

- Eurovision Song Contest 1975
- Participating broadcaster: British Broadcasting Corporation (BBC)
- Country: United Kingdom
- Selection process: Artist: Internal selection Song: A Song for Europe 1975
- Selection date: 15 February 1975

Competing entry
- Song: "Let Me Be the One"
- Artist: The Shadows
- Songwriter: Paul Curtis

Placement
- Final result: 2nd, 138 points

Participation chronology

The United Kingdom was represented at the Eurovision Song Contest 1975 with the song "Let Me Be the One", written by Paul Curtis, and performed by the Shadows. The British participating broadcaster, the British Broadcasting Corporation (BBC), selected its entry through a national final, after having previously selected the performers internally.

== Before Eurovision ==
=== Artist selection ===
The British Broadcasting Corporation (BBC) selected the Shadows to represent the United Kindgdom, after BBC executive Bill Cotton had stated that he specifically wanted a group to sing for Britain in 1975. His choice was met with a negative response by the UK media, the song writing community and the general public. The choice of the Shadows led to calls from the Music Publishers Association for the songwriters and composers to be allowed to select the artist of their choice to perform the songs in future UK selections for Eurovision and the low postal vote persuaded the BBC that a new format was indeed needed. This was inaugurated in 1976.

=== A Song for Europe 1975 ===
Members of the group were responsible for two of the six shortlisted songs, causing a further outcry from the music publishers associations. The Shadows performed one song a week for six weeks on the BBC1 series Lulu, hosted by 1969 Eurovision joint winner Lulu. Uniquely, although the group were seen performing weekly, in fact they only recorded one performance of each of the six songs in December 1974, for a special edition of the series broadcast on 15 February 1975. These performances were then shown individually for the six week period, before being shown back-to-back in the final, followed by an immediate repeat of all six. Viewers cast votes via postcard for their favourite song and the winning entry announced on 22 February was "Let Me Be the One" which received 17,477 votes, the lowest published figure known for a winning song in the UK finals that used either voting by mail or telephone. The winning song was written by Paul Curtis, who won the A Song for Europe contest another three times, making him the most successful writer in the history of the British selection process. He also wrote a further 21 songs that reached the British finals. "Let Me Be the One" became the record ninth British entry to place 2nd in the Eurovision Song Contest.

A Song for Europe 1975 – 15 February 1975
R/O	Song	Songwriter(s)	Votes	Place
1	"No No Nina"	John Farrar; Peter Best	1,261	6
2	"This House Runs on Sunshine"	Brian Bennett; Mike Redway	10,451	3
3	"Don't Throw It All Away"	Gary Benson; David Mindel	3,099	4
4	"Cool Clear Air"	Guy Fletcher; Doug Flett	1,601	5
5	"Stand Up Like a Man"	Ben Findon; Michael Myers	14,294	2
6	"Let Me Be the One"	Paul Curtis	17,477	1

=== Chart success ===
The Shadows released all six songs from the A Song for Europe 1975 final shortly after the contest on the album Specs Appeal. The top two songs were released on single, peaking at No.12 in the UK singles chart, their first hit single since 1967. Gary Benson released his own recording of "Don't Throw It All Away", which had placed 4th in the final, reaching No. 20 in the UK singles chart later in 1975. Amongst others, Olivia Newton-John, Barrington Levy and The Delfonics all released versions of this song. Subsequently, all six songs by the Shadows were made available on CD compilations and re-issues, including an instrumental demo version of "No No Nina" which had placed last in the UK selection. The Dooleys recorded a version of the runner-up "Stand Up Like a Man" and French singer Keeley Hawes recorded a French version of the winner, "Laisse-moi danser tu l'été", whilst a Danish version, "Lad mig blive din" was recorded by Eurovision Song Contest 1963 co-winner Grethe Ingmann.

== At Eurovision ==
"Let Me Be the One" won the national and went on to come 2nd in the contest.

For the Eurovision Song Contest, broadcast on 22 March 1975, Pete Murray provided the BBC Television commentary, having previously presented the contest for BBC Radio in 1968 and 1969, 1972 and 1973. Terry Wogan once again provided the radio commentary on BBC Radio 2. British Forces Radio had been scheduled to broadcast the contest with commentary provided by Richard Astbury, but technical difficulties prevented the broadcast from going ahead.

=== Voting ===
Points awarded to the United Kingdom
Score	Country
12 points	France; Luxembourg; Monaco; Yugoslavia
10 points	Belgium; Germany; Israel; Spain
8 points	Malta; Switzerland
7 points	Finland; Norway
6 points	
5 points	Portugal; Sweden
4 points	Netherlands
3 points	Ireland; Italy
2 points	
1 point	

Points awarded by the United Kingdom
Score	Country
12 points	Netherlands
10 points	Italy
8 points	France
7 points	Sweden
6 points	Ireland
5 points	Switzerland
4 points	Finland
3 points	Luxembourg
2 points	Monaco
1 point	Israel
