= Eurovision Song Contest 1975 =

International song competition

Date and venue
- Final: 22 March 1975
- Venue: Stockholmsmässan; Stockholm, Sweden

Organisation
- Organiser: European Broadcasting Union (EBU)
- Scrutineer: Clifford Brown

Production
- Host broadcaster: Sveriges Radio (SR)
- Director: Bo Billtén
- Executive producer: Roland Eiworth
- Musical director: Mats Olsson
- Presenter: Karin Falck

Participants
- Number of entries: 19
- Debuting countries: Turkey
- Returning countries: France; Malta
- Non-returning countries: Greece
- Participation map: Competing countries Countries that participated in the past but not in 1975

Vote
- Voting system: Each country awarded 12, 10, 8-1 points to their ten favourite songs
- Winning song: Netherlands "Ding-a-dong"

The Eurovision Song Contest 1975 was the 20th edition of the Eurovision Song Contest, held on 22 March 1975 at the Stockholmsmässan in Stockholm, Sweden, and presented by Karin Falck. It was organised by the European Broadcasting Union (EBU) and host broadcaster Sveriges Radio (SR), who staged the event after winning the 1974 contest for Sweden with the song "Waterloo" by ABBA.

Broadcasters from nineteen countries were represented at the contest – a new record number of participants. Turkey made its first entry in the contest, and France and Malta returned after a one- and two-year absence, respectively. Greece, after participating for the first time in the previous year's event, opted not to participate in 1975, due to the Turkish invasion of Cyprus in 1974.

The winner was the Netherlands with the song "Ding-a-dong", composed by Dick Bakker, written by Will Luikinga and Eddy Ouwens, and performed by the group Teach-In. This was the Netherlands' fourth contest victory, matching the record number of contest wins previously set by France and Luxembourg. Having been the opening song of the contest, it was also the first time that a country had won from first position in the running order. The United Kingdom, Italy, France, and Luxembourg rounded out the top five, with the United Kingdom achieving a record-extending ninth second-place finish.

A new voting system was introduced at this contest; each country gave 12 points to its favourite, 10 points to its second favourite, and then 8 points to 1 point to other countries in descending order of preference. This numerical order of awarded points has since been used in every subsequent edition of the contest.

== Location ==
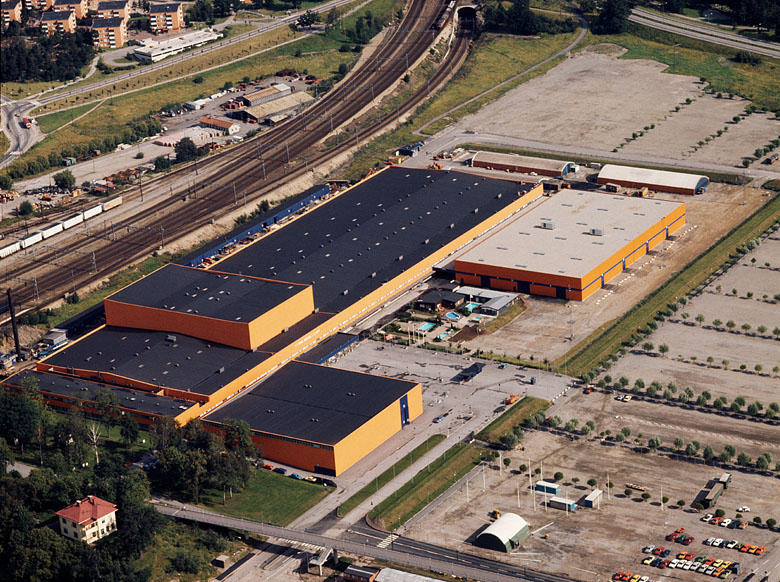
Stockholmsmässan, Stockholm – host venue of the 1975 contest

The 1975 contest took place in Stockholm, Sweden, following the country's victory at the 1974 contest with the song "Waterloo" performed by ABBA. It was the first time that Sweden had hosted the event. The chosen venue was the Sankt Eriks-Mässan, an exhibition centre in the Älvsjö district of southern Stockholm opened in 1971; in 1976 the venue was renamed to Stockholmsmässan.

The Swedish broadcaster Sveriges Radio (SR) had initially been reluctant to stage the event, mainly due to the high costs that came with it which would have been placed on the organisation. There had also been considerable pressure and disquiet from left-wing groups in the country that initially opposed the amount of money being spent by the public broadcaster on a commercial event, which subsequently developed into a wider protest against the general commercialisation of music in Sweden; this led to street protests and a counter-festival, Alternativfestivalen ('the Alternative Festival'), being held during the week of Eurovision 1975.

SR had attempted to negotiate with the European Broadcasting Union (EBU) and other participating broadcasters to enact a form of cost-sharing to fund the event, however a solution failed to materialise prior to the contest and SR was ultimately faced with funding the contest alone. These discussions, however, did eventually lead to the introduction of a new financing system for 1976 and future events, with the running costs of the event being split across all participating countries. However, fears of the potential costs required to host the event should Sweden have won again, coupled with the pressure from left-wing groups, meant that SR ultimately decided not to participate in the 1976 event.

== Participants ==
Eurovision Song Contest 1975 – Participation summaries by country
- Belgium; Finland; France; Germany; Ireland; Israel; Italy; Luxembourg; Malta; Monaco; Netherlands; Norway; Portugal; Spain; Sweden; Switzerland; Turkey; United Kingdom; Yugoslavia

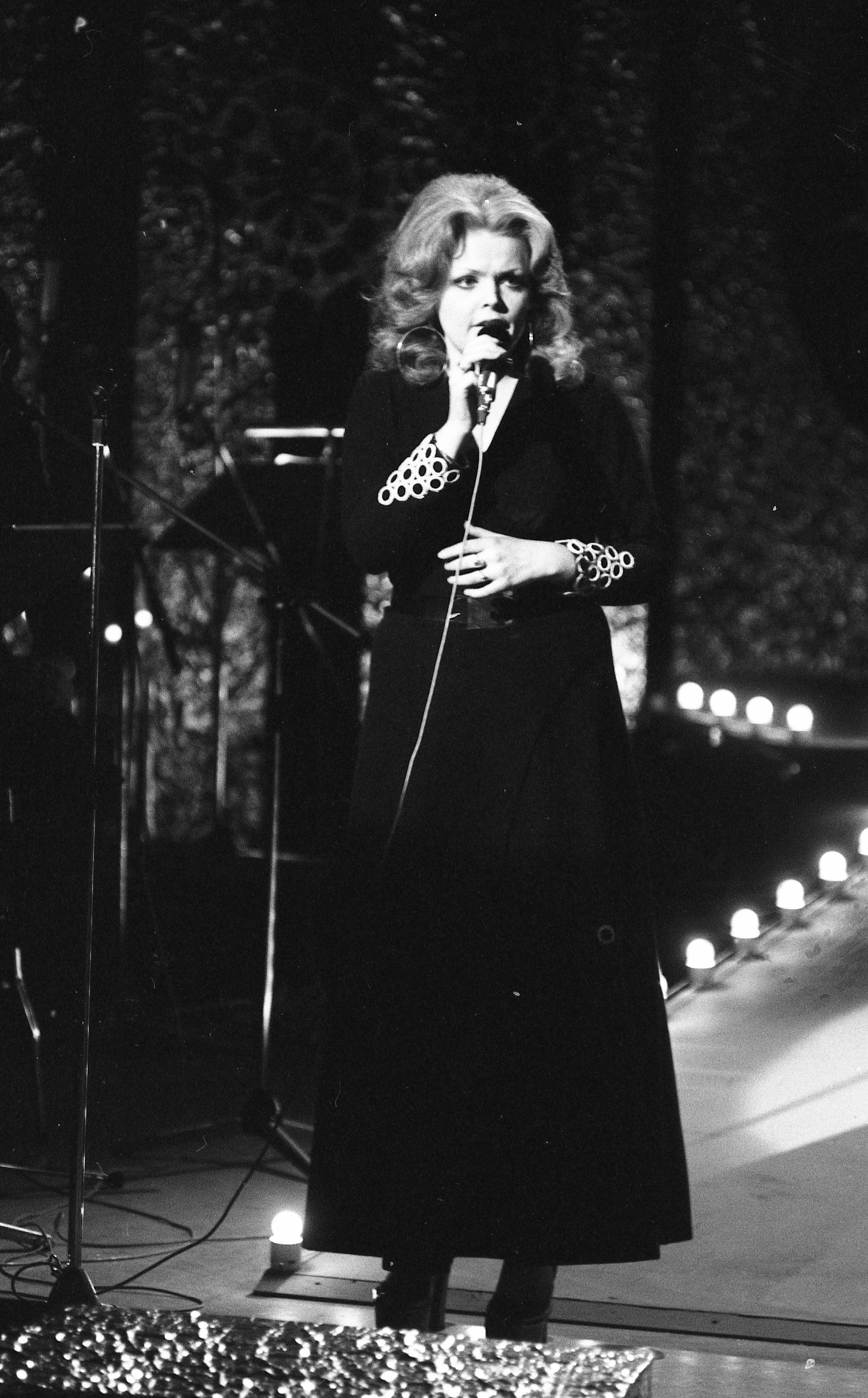
Ellen Nikolaysen represented Norway for a second time

A total of 19 countries participated in the 1975 contest – a new record number of participants. This included the first ever appearance of Turkey, and entries from France and Malta, which last participated in 1973 and 1972, respectively. Broadcasters in Greece, which participated for the first time in 1974, and Austria, last seen in the contest in 1972, had also considered participating in the contest, however no entries from these countries were ultimately submitted; Greece had reportedly decided against participating at a late stage, and may have opted to refuse to compete alongside Turkey following the Turkish invasion of Cyprus.

Ellen Nikolaysen competed in the contest for a second time, having previously participated for Norway in 1973 as a member of the Bendik Singers. Additionally, John Farrar, a member of the Shadows, had previously supported the United Kingdom in 1973 as a backing vocalist.

Eurovision Song Contest 1975 participants
Country	Broadcaster	Artist	Song	Language	Songwriter(s)	Conductor
Belgium	BRT	Ann Christy	"Gelukkig zijn"	Dutch, English	Mary Boduin	Francis Bay
Finland	YLE	Pihasoittajat	"Old Man Fiddle"	English	Hannu Karlsson; Kim Kuusi; Arthur Ridgway Spencer	Ossi Runne
France	TF1	Nicole	"Et bonjour à toi l'artiste"	French	Jeff Barnel; Pierre Delanoë	Jean Musy
Germany	HR (Note: On behalf of the German public broadcasting consortium ARD)	Joy Fleming	"Ein Lied kann eine Brücke sein"	German, English	Michael Holm; Rainer Pietsch	Rainer Pietsch
Ireland	RTÉ	The Swarbriggs	"That's What Friends Are For"	English	Jimmy Swarbrigg; Tommy Swarbrigg	Colman Pearce
Israel	IBA	Shlomo Artzi	"At Ve'Ani" (את ואני)	Hebrew	Shlomo Artzi; Ehud Manor	Eldad Shrem
Italy	RAI	Wess and Dori Ghezzi	"Era"	Italian	Andrea Lo Vecchio; Shel Shapiro	Natale Massara
Luxembourg	CLT	Géraldine	"Toi"	French	Phil Coulter; Pierre Cour; Bill Martin	Phil Coulter
Malta	MBA	Renato	"Singing This Song"	English	Sammy Galea; M. Iris Misfud	Vince Tempera
Monaco	TMC	Sophie	"Une chanson c'est une lettre"	French	Boris Bergman; André Popp	André Popp
Netherlands	NOS	Teach-In	"Ding-a-dong"	English	Dick Bakker; Will Luikinga; Eddy Ouwens	Harry van Hoof
Norway	NRK	Ellen Nikolaysen	"Touch My Life with Summer"	English	Svein Hundnes; Johnny Sareussen	Carsten Klouman
Portugal	RTP	Duarte Mendes	"Madrugada"	Portuguese	José Luís Tinoco	Pedro Osório
Spain	TVE	Sergio and Estíbaliz	"Tú volverás"	Spanish	Juan Carlos Calderón	Juan Carlos Calderón
Sweden	SR	Lars Berghagen	"Jennie, Jennie"	English	Lars Berghagen	Lars Samuelson
Switzerland	SRG SSR	Simone Drexel	"Mikado"	German	Simone Drexel	Peter Jacques
Turkey	TRT	Semiha Yankı	"Seninle Bir Dakika"	Turkish	Hikmet Münir Ebcioğlu; Kemal Ebcioğlu	Timur Selçuk
United Kingdom	BBC	The Shadows	"Let Me Be the One"	English	Paul Curtis	Alyn Ainsworth
Yugoslavia	JRT	Pepel in kri (Note: Credited on screen as "Ashes and Blood")	"Dan ljubezni"	Slovene	Tadej Hrušovar; Dušan Velkaverh	Mario Rijavec

== Production and format ==
The Eurovision Song Contest 1975 was produced by SR. Roland Eiworth served as executive producer, Bo Billtén served as producer and director, Bo-Ruben Hedwall served as production designer and Mats Olsson served as musical director, leading the orchestra. A separate musical director could be nominated by each participating delegation to lead the orchestra during its country's performance, with the host musical director also available to conduct for those countries which did not send their own conductor. On behalf of the contest organisers, the EBU, the event was overseen by Clifford Brown as scrutineer.

Each participating broadcaster submitted one song, which was required to be no longer than three minutes in duration. As in 1973 and 1974, artists were able to perform in any language, and not necessarily that of the country their represented. A maximum of six performers were allowed on stage during each country's performance. Each entry could utilise all or part of the live orchestra and could use instrumental-only backing tracks, however any backing tracks used could only include the sound of instruments featured on stage being mimed by the performers.

Rehearsals in the contest venue for the competing entries began on 19 March 1975, with each participating act having a 50-minute slot on stage to perform through its entry with the orchestra. The first full rehearsals for all entries were held over two days on 19 and 20 March and conducted without stage costumes. A second round of rehearsals, this time in full costume, was held for all acts on 21 March, with each country given 20 minutes on stage. This was followed that evening with a general dress rehearsal, including a dummy voting process. Technical rehearsals and a final dress rehearsal were held on the morning of 22 March. During the dress rehearsals some of the artists performed their songs in different languages to that which they would be presented during the live broadcast; specifically, the Yugoslav and Portuguese acts performed their entries in English in the dress rehearsal, and then in Slovene and Portuguese in the final, respectively. The Dutch entrants were given an additional rehearsal shortly before the live transmission; this was requested by Dick Bakker, the composer of the Dutch song. Bakker felt that during the general rehearsals the sound quality was noticeably poorer during their entry, the first to perform each time, and that the sound technicians needed time to fix their equipment, which was generally done during their rehearsal slot.

There was a tight security situation at the venue in the run-up to, and during, the event; the Swedish Security Service (SÄPO) had received intelligence reports that the contest may become a target of the West German far-left militant group the Red Army Faction (RAF). The threat to the contest did not ultimately materialise, however one month after the event the RAF targeted the West German embassy in Stockholm.

=== Voting procedure ===
Following the abandoned attempt at introducing a new voting system at the previous year's event, plans for a new system to replace both the system used between 1971 and 1973 and that used in 1974 came to fruition in autumn 1974. A sub-group, comprising individuals from Germany's ARD, Sweden's SR, and Finland's YLE, was set up, and various new voting systems were proposed: ARD suggested that each country should identify its top nine entries and award points ranging between 1 and 10, while YLE proposed a scoring system to award points to eight countries, with the favourite of each country given 14 points, then 10, 7 and 5–1. The Finnish broadcaster also proposed as a compromise awarding to nine countries 10 and 8–1 points. Based on the above ideas, the UK's BBC proposed the 12, 10 and 8–1 pattern which was later adopted for this contest, and which had been used in all subsequent editions as of 2025.

Each country had a jury of eleven members ranging from ages 16 to 60, with a recommendation that there should be a balance between the sexes and that half should be under 25 years old. Each jury member awarded all songs a score between one and five immediately after they had been performed, with no abstentions allowed and without voting for the country they represented. The song which gained the most votes received 12 points, followed by 10 points to the song which got the second highest number of votes, and then between 8 and 1 points for the third- to tenth-placed songs. Ties for any of the positions would be decided by a show of hands. The order of presenting the points by each country's spokesperson was done in performance order; it would not be until 1980 that the points would be awarded in ascending order, starting at 1 point and finishing with 12 points.

== Contest overview ==
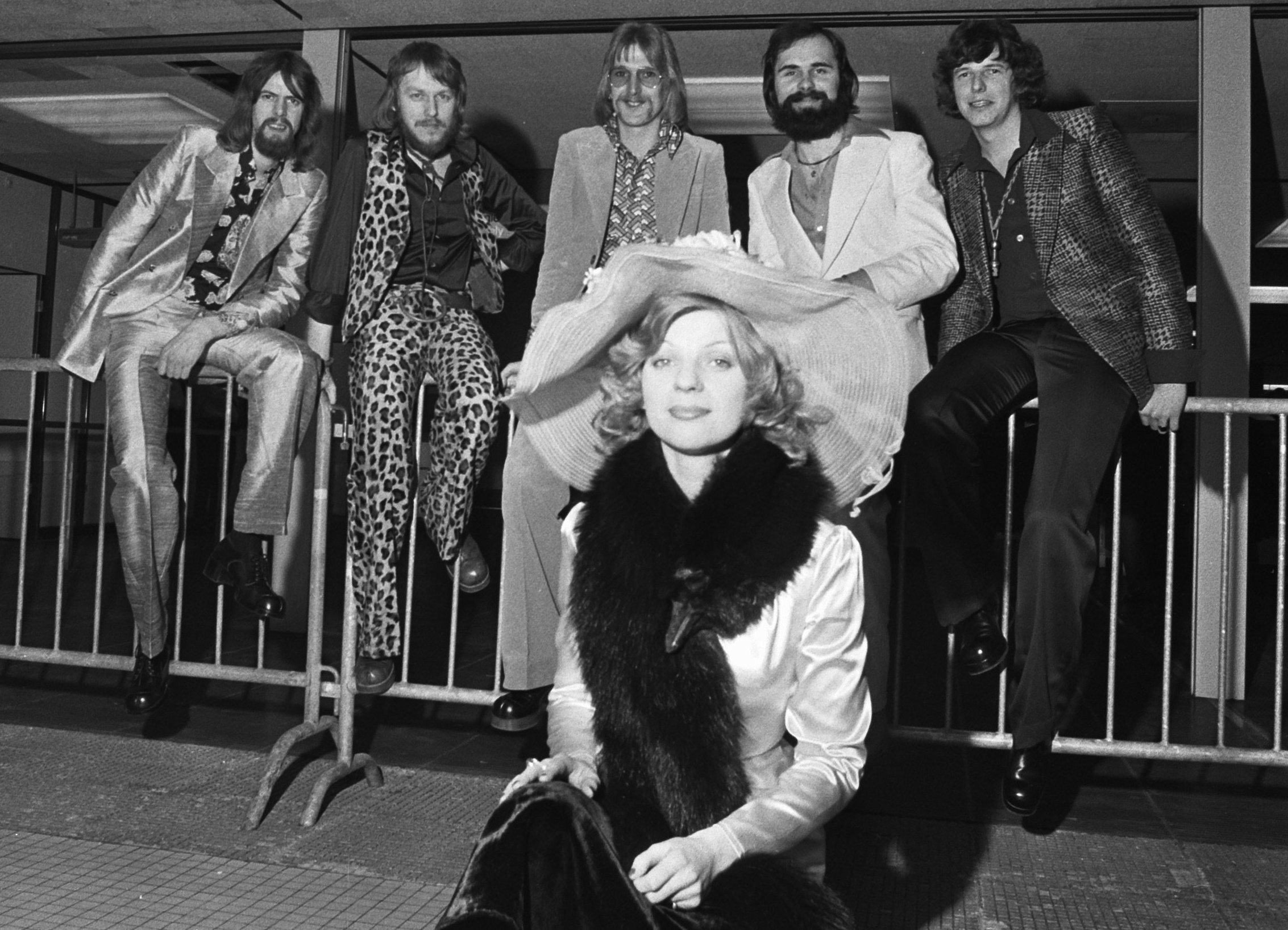
Members of Teach-In at Schiphol Airport prior to the contest

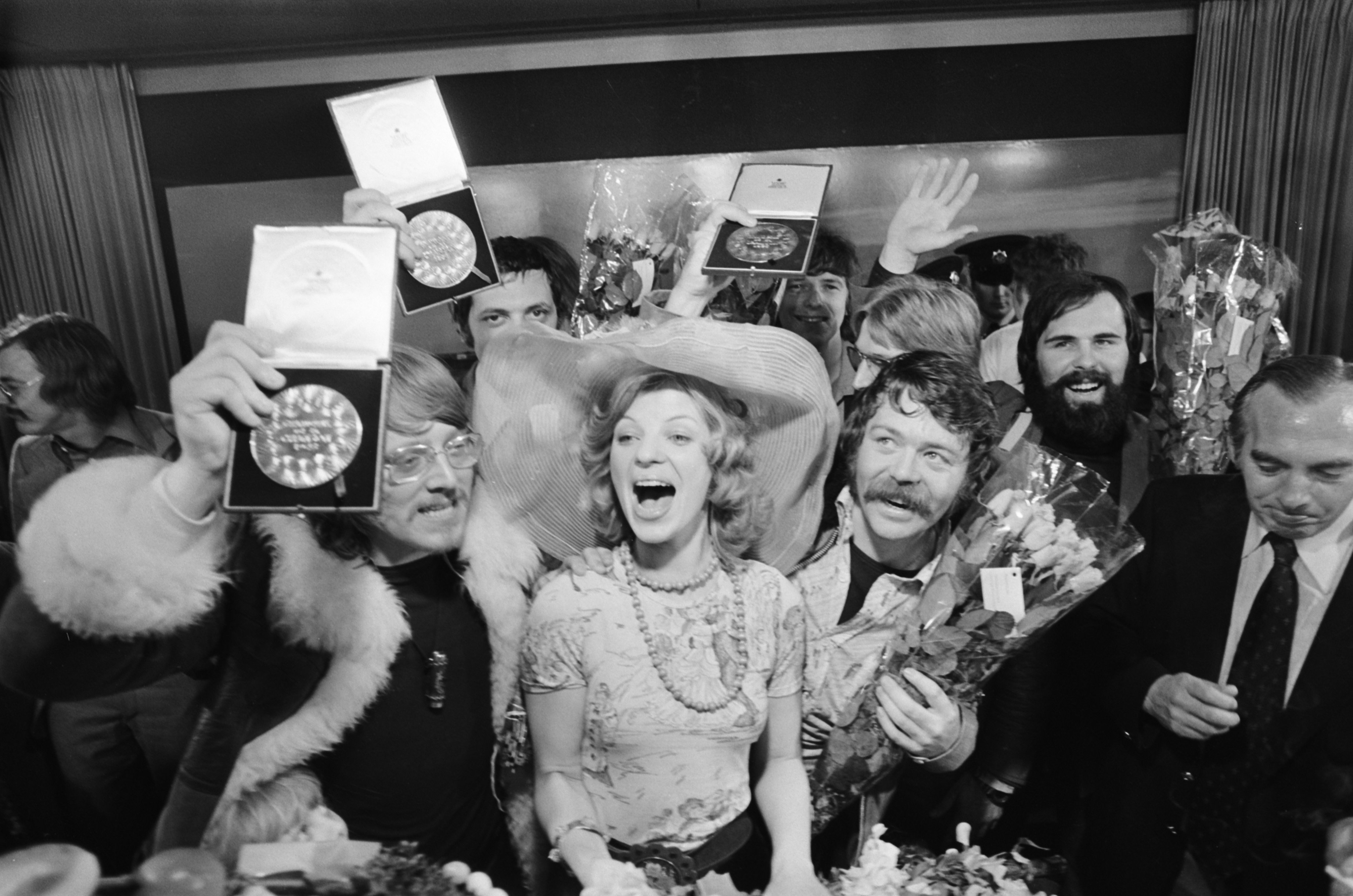
Teach-In and the songwriters of "Ding-a-dong" at Schiphol Airport following the contest, with the medallions awarded to the songwriters

The contest was held on 22 March 1975, beginning at 21:00 (CET) and lasting 2 hours and 12 minutes. The contest was presented by the Swedish television presenter, producer and director Karin Falck. Following the confirmation of the 19 participating countries, a draw was held in Geneva on 24 January 1975 to determine the running order (R/O) of the contest.

The contest was opened by a film montage portraying various cultural stereotypes of Sweden and the Swedish people. Each entry was preceded by a video postcard, which served as an introduction to that country's entry and to create a transition between entries to allow stage crew to make changes on stage; the postcards showed each country's entrant backstage painting a portrait of themselves and the flag of their nation onto a blank canvas. The interval act was entitled "The World of John Bauer" (Swedish: John Bauers värld), comprising a montage of examples of the Swedish illustrator's work, particularly from his anthology Among Gnomes and Trolls, set to music from the orchestra. The medallions awarded to the winning songwriters were presented by the Secretary-General of the European Broadcasting Union Henrik Hahr.

The winner was the Netherlands represented by the song "Ding-a-dong", composed by Bakker, written by Will Luikinga and Eddy Ouwens, and performed by Teach-In. It was the Netherlands' fourth contest win, following victories in 1957, 1959 and 1969; the Netherlands thus joined France and Luxembourg as the countries with the most contest wins at that point. It was additionally the first time that the song which was performed first had gone on to win the contest. The UK came second for a record-extending ninth time, and Malta, which had come last in its two previous contest appearances, achieved its best result to date with a twelfth-place finish. Turkey, meanwhile, finished in last place on its debut appearance.

Results of the Eurovision Song Contest 1975
R/O	Country	Artist	Song	Points	Place
1	Netherlands	Teach-In	"Ding-a-dong"	152	1
2	Ireland	The Swarbriggs	"That's What Friends Are For"	68	9
3	France	Nicole	"Et bonjour à toi l'artiste"	91	4
4	Germany	Joy Fleming	"Ein Lied kann eine Brücke sein"	15	17
5	Luxembourg	Géraldine	"Toi"	84	5
6	Norway	Ellen Nikolaysen	"Touch My Life with Summer"	11	18
7	Switzerland	Simone Drexel	"Mikado"	77	6
8	Yugoslavia	Pepel in kri	"Dan ljubezni"	22	13
9	United Kingdom	The Shadows	"Let Me Be the One"	138	2
10	Malta	Renato	"Singing This Song"	32	12
11	Belgium	Ann Christy	"Gelukkig zijn"	17	15
12	Israel	Shlomo Artzi	"At Ve'Ani"	40	11
13	Turkey	Semiha Yankı	"Seninle Bir Dakika"	3	19
14	Monaco	Sophie	"Une chanson c'est une lettre"	22	13
15	Finland	Pihasoittajat	"Old Man Fiddle"	74	7
16	Portugal	Duarte Mendes	"Madrugada"	16	16
17	Spain	Sergio and Estíbaliz	"Tú volverás"	53	10
18	Sweden	Lars Berghagen	"Jennie, Jennie"	72	8
19	Italy	Wess and Dori Ghezzi	"Era"	115	3

=== Spokespersons ===
Each participating broadcaster appointed a spokesperson, connected to the contest venue via telephone lines and responsible for announcing, in English or French, the votes for its respective country. Known spokespersons at the 1975 contest are listed below.

- Finland – Kaarina Pönniö
- Spain – José María Íñigo
- Sweden – Sven Lindahl
- United Kingdom – Ray Moore

== Detailed voting results ==
Jury voting was used to determine the points awarded by all countries. The announcement of the results from each country was conducted in the order in which they performed, with the spokespersons announcing their country's points in English or French in performance order. The detailed breakdown of the points awarded by each country is listed in the tables below, with voting countries listed in the order in which they presented their votes.

Detailed voting results of the Eurovision Song Contest 1975
		Total score	Netherlands	Ireland	France	Germany	Luxembourg	Norway	Switzerland	Yugoslavia	United Kingdom	Malta	Belgium	Israel	Turkey	Monaco	Finland	Portugal	Spain	Sweden	Italy
Contestants	Netherlands	**152**		8	5	8	10	**12**	6	8	**12**	**12**	3	**12**	4	10	10	7	**12**	**12**	1
Contestants	Ireland	68	6		6			4	7	1	6	4	**12**				1	4	3	10	4
Contestants	France	91	8	**12**					3		8	7	2	7	1	7		**12**	8	8	8
Contestants	Germany	15					8					3							4		
Contestants	Luxembourg	84	**12**	10	3					7	3	5		6	5		5	8	6	4	10
Contestants	Norway	11	2													2					7
Contestants	Switzerland	77	7	2	10	6	2	1			5	6	8		7	5	4	2			**12**
Contestants	Yugoslavia	22	3	4		2							5					1		7	
Contestants	United Kingdom	138	4	3	**12**	10	**12**	7	8	**12**		8	10	10		**12**	7	5	10	5	3
Contestants	Malta	32	1		8		5	2	4	2			7	1	2						
Contestants	Belgium	17	5			7				3										2	
Contestants	Israel	40	10	1	1	1	1	5	2		1		1		6		3			6	2
Contestants	Turkey	3														3					
Contestants	Monaco	22				3	4				2	1		2			2	3			5
Contestants	Finland	74		5		**12**	6	10	**12**	5	4			8		8			1	3	
Contestants	Portugal	16			2										**12**				2		
Contestants	Spain	53		7		5		3	5	4			4	4	3	4	8				6
Contestants	Sweden	72			7		7	8	1	6	7	2		3	8	6	6	6	5		
Contestants	Italy	115		6	4	4	3	6	10	10	10	10	6	5	10	1	**12**	10	7	1	

=== 12 points ===
The below table summarises how the maximum 12 points were awarded from one country to another. The winning country is shown in bold. The Netherlands received the maximum score of 12 points from six of the voting countries, with the UK receiving four sets of 12 points, Finland and France each receiving two sets of maximum scores, and Ireland, Italy, Luxembourg, Portugal and Switzerland receiving one maximum score each.

Distribution of 12 points awarded at the Eurovision Song Contest 1975
N.	Contestant	Nation(s) giving 12 points
6	**Netherlands**	Israel, Malta, Norway, Spain, Sweden, United Kingdom
4	United Kingdom	France, Luxembourg, Monaco, Yugoslavia
2	Finland	Germany, Switzerland
2	France	Ireland, Portugal
1	Ireland	Belgium
1	Italy	Finland
1	Luxembourg	Netherlands
1	Portugal	Turkey
1	Switzerland	Italy

== Broadcasts ==
Broadcasters competing in the event were required to relay the contest via its networks; non-participating EBU member broadcasters were also able to relay the contest. Broadcasters were able to send commentators to provide coverage of the contest in their own native language and to relay information about the artists and songs to their television viewers.

In addition to the participating nations, the contest was also reportedly aired, live or deferred, by broadcasters in Eastern European countries via Intervision, and in Australia, Denmark, Greece, Hong Kong, Iceland, Japan, Jordan, Morocco and South Korea. The contest was reported to have had a possible maximum audience of over 700 million people.

A planned broadcast in Chile by its public broadcaster Televisión Nacional de Chile was prevented by SR, following pressure from the Swedish Musicians' Union in opposition to the Chilean military dictatorship. Rolf Rembe, spokesman for the union, said that broadcasting the festival to Chile "would give the impression that relations between Chile and world artists are normal".

Known details on the broadcasts in each country, including the specific broadcasting stations and commentators are shown in the tables below.

Broadcasters and commentators in participating countries
Country	Broadcaster	Channel(s)	Commentator(s)	Ref.
Belgium	BRT	BRT, BRT 1	Jan Geysen and Robrecht Willaert	
Belgium	RTB	RTB	Paule Herreman	
Belgium	RTB	RTB 2		
Finland	YLE	TV1	Heikki Seppälä	
Finland	YLE	Rinnakkaisohjelma	Erkki Melakoski	
France	TF1		Georges de Caunes	
Germany	ARD	Deutsches Fernsehen	Werner Veigel	
Ireland	RTÉ	RTÉ	Mike Murphy	
Ireland	RTÉ	RTÉ Radio	Liam Devally	
Israel	IBA	Israeli Television		
Italy	RAI	Programma Nazionale TV, Secondo Programma	Silvio Noto	
Luxembourg	CLT	RTL Télé-Luxembourg		
Malta	MBA	TVM, Radio Malta	Norman Hamilton	
Netherlands	NOS	Nederland 2	Willem Duys	
Norway	NRK	NRK Fjernsynet, NRK (Note: Deferred broadcast on NRK at 23:00 (CET))	John Andreassen	
Portugal	RTP	I Programa		
Spain	TVE	TVE 1	José Luis Uribarri	
Spain	RNE	RNE Canarias		
Spain	Cadena SER (Note: Simulcast on Radio Castellón, Radio Girona, Radio Huesca, Radio San Sebastián, Radio Sevilla, Radio Valladolid, and Radio Zaragoza.)		Joaquín Prat	
Sweden	SR	TV1	Åke Strömmer	
Sweden	SR	SR P3	Ursula Richter	
Switzerland	SRG SSR	TV DRS		
Switzerland	SRG SSR	TSR	Georges Hardy	
Switzerland	SRG SSR	TSI (Note: Delayed broadcast the following day at 15:15 (CET))		
Switzerland	SRG SSR	RSR 1	Robert Burnier	
Turkey	TRT	TRT Televizyon		
United Kingdom	BBC	BBC1	Pete Murray	
United Kingdom	BBC	BBC Radio 2 (Note: Simulcast on BBC Radio 1, BBC Radio Birmingham, BBC Radio Brighton, BBC Radio Carlisle, BBC Radio Cleveland, BBC Radio Leeds, BBC Radio London, BBC Radio Medway, and BBC Radio Newcastle.)	Terry Wogan	
United Kingdom	BFBS	BFBS Radio	Terry Wogan	
Yugoslavia	JRT	TV Beograd 1		
Yugoslavia	JRT	TV Koper-Capodistria		
Yugoslavia	JRT	TV Ljubljana 1		
Yugoslavia	JRT	TV Sarajevo		
Yugoslavia	JRT	TV Skopje (Note: Deferred broadcast at 22:45 (CET))		
Yugoslavia	JRT	TV Zagreb 1		

Broadcasters and commentators in non-participating countries
Country	Broadcaster	Channel(s)	Commentator(s)	Ref.
Austria	ORF	FS2	Ernst Grissemann	
Denmark	DR	DR TV	Per Møller Hansen	
Greece	EIRT	EIRT (Note: Deferred broadcast the following day)		
Hungary	MTV	MTV1 (Note: Delayed broadcast on 20 April 1975 at 16:05 (CET))		
Iceland	RÚV	Sjónvarpið (Note: Delayed broadcast on 13 April 1975 at 21:10 (WET))	Dóra Hafsteinsdóttir	
Poland	TP	TP1 (Note: Deferred broadcast in a shortened format on 26 April 1975 at 00:20 (CET))		
Romania	TVR	Programul 1 (Note: Delayed broadcast on 5 April 1975 at 22:05 (EET))		
South Korea	KBS	KBS (Note: Delayed broadcast on 25 April 1975 at 19:35 (KST))		

== Notes and references ==
=== Bibliography ===
- Dubin, Adam; Vuletic, Dean; Obregón, Antonio, eds. (2022). The Eurovision Song Contest as a Cultural Phenomenon: from Concert Halls to the Halls of Academia. Abingdon-on-Thames, United Kingdom; New York, NY, United States: Routledge. pp. 180–188. doi:10.4324/9781003188933-16. ISBN 978-1-032-03774-5. OCLC 1296690839.
- Murtomäki, Asko (2007). Finland 12 points! Suomen Euroviisut (in Finnish). Helsinki, Finland: Teos. ISBN 951-851-106-3.
- O'Connor, John Kennedy (2010). The Eurovision Song Contest: The Official History (2nd ed.). London, United Kingdom: Carlton Books. ISBN 978-1-84732-521-1.
- Roxburgh, Gordon (2014). Songs for Europe: The United Kingdom at the Eurovision Song Contest. Vol. Two: The 1970s. Prestatyn, United Kingdom: Telos Publishing. ISBN 978-1-84583-093-9.
- Thorsson, Leif; Verhage, Martin (2006). Melodifestivalen genom tiderna : de svenska uttagningarna och internationella finalerna [Melodifestivalen through the ages: the Swedish selections and international finals] (in Swedish). Stockholm, Sweden: Premium Publishing. ISBN 91-89136-29-2.
- West, Chris (April 2020). Eurovision! A History of Modern Europe Through the World's Greatest Song Contest (Updated ed.). London, United Kingdom: Melville House UK. ISBN 978-1-911545-55-2.
