= Norway in the Eurovision Song Contest 1975 =

- Eurovision Song Contest 1975
- Participating broadcaster: Norsk rikskringkasting (NRK)
- Country: Norway
- Selection process: Melodi Grand Prix 1975
- Selection date: 25 January 1975

Competing entry
- Song: "Touch My Life (with Summer)"
- Artist: Ellen Nikolaysen
- Songwriter: Svein Hundsnes

Placement
- Final result: 18th, 11 points

Participation chronology

Norway was represented at the Eurovision Song Contest 1975 with the song "Touch My Life (with Summer)", written by Svein Hundsnes, and performed by Ellen Nikolaysen. The Norwegian participating broadcaster, Norsk rikskringkasting (NRK), organised the national final Melodi Grand Prix 1975 in order to select its entry for the contest. Nikolaysen had previously represented Norway in 1973 as a member of the Bendik Singers, and had also provided backing vocals for Anne-Karine Strøm in 1974.

== Before Eurovision ==
=== Melodi Grand Prix 1975 ===
Norsk rikskringkasting (NRK) held the Melodi Grand Prix 1975 at its studios in Oslo, hosted by Bergljot Engeset. Five songs were presented in the final with each song sung twice by different singers, once with a small combo and once with a full orchestra. The winning song was chosen by voting from a 10-member "expert" jury. "Touch My Life (with Summer)" was performed in Norwegian at the Melodi Grand Prix titled "Det skulle ha vært sommer nå" and was translated into English before going to Eurovision.

Final – 25 January 1975
R/O	Artist		Song	Points	Place
R/O	Combo	Orchestra	Song	Points	Place
1	Øystein Sunde	Benny Borg	"En enkel sang"	30	3
2	Stein Ingebrigtsen	Ellen Nikolaysen	"Det skulle ha vært sommer nå"	39	1
3	Maj-Britt Andersen	Anne-Karine Strøm	"1+1=2"	23	4
4	Jahn Teigen	Jan Høiland	"Kjærlighetens under"	32	2
5	Brit Elisabeth Haagensli	Gro Anita Schønn	"Ah, du gjør meg så glad"	16	5

Detailed Jury Votes
R/O	Song	S. Børja	H. Hurum	S. Jansen	K. Krog	E. Kapstad	R. Levin	G. Rugstand	T. Rypdal	S. Skguen	K. Siem	Total
1	"En enkel sang"	2	3	3	4	3	3	4	2	2	4	30
2	"Det skulle ha vært sommer nå"	5	4	5	5	4	4	3	5	2	4	39
3	"1+1=2"	1	2	4	4	2	1	1	3	1	4	23
4	"Kjærlighetens under"	1	3	2	3	5	5	5	2	3	3	32
5	"Ah, du gjør meg så glad"	1	1	1	2	2	2	2	1	1	3	16

== At Eurovision ==
During the preparation of the contest, the song "Det skulle ha vært sommer nå" was translated as "Touch My Life (with Summer)".

On the night of the final Nikolaysen performed 6th in the running order, following Luxembourg and preceding Switzerland. At the close of voting, Norway picked up only 11 points, placing Norway 18th of the 19 entries, ahead only of Turkey.

=== Voting ===
Points awarded to Norway
Score	Country
12 points	
10 points	
8 points	
7 points	Italy
6 points	
5 points	
4 points	
3 points	
2 points	Monaco; Netherlands
1 point	

Points awarded by Norway
Score	Country
12 points	Netherlands
10 points	Finland
8 points	Sweden
7 points	United Kingdom
6 points	Italy
5 points	Israel
4 points	Ireland
3 points	Spain
2 points	Malta
1 point	Switzerland
