= Un corpo e un'anima =

Single by Wess & Dori Ghezzi

from the album Un corpo e un'anima
- B-side: "Sempre tu"
- Released: 1974
- Genre: pop
- Label: Durium
- Songwriter(s): Luigi Albertelli; Felice "Lubiak" Piccarreda; Damiano Dattoli; Umberto Tozzi
- Producer(s): Felice Piccarreda

Wess & Dori Ghezzi singles chronology
| "Noi due per sempre" (1974) | "Un corpo e un'anima" (1974) | "Era" (1975) |

Audio
- "Un corpo e un'anima" on YouTube

"Un corpo e un'anima" (lit. 'One body and one soul') is a 1974 song recorded by Wess and Dori Ghezzi.

== Background ==
The song was the surprise winner of the 1974 edition of Canzonissima. It became Wess and Ghezzi's signature song and the first hit composed by Umberto Tozzi.

== Track listing ==
| No. | Title | Writer(s) | Length |
|---|---|---|---|
| 1. | "Un corpo e un'anima" | Luigi Albertelli, Lubiak, Damiano Dattoli, Umberto Tozzi | 3:44 |
| 2. | "Sempre tu" | Cristiano Malgioglio, Italo Janne, Lubiak | 3:17 |

== Charts ==
| Chart (1975) | Peak position |
|---|---|
| Italy (Musica e dischi) | 1 |
