= Switzerland in the Eurovision Song Contest 1975 =

- Eurovision Song Contest 1975
- Participating broadcaster: Swiss Broadcasting Corporation (SRG SSR)
- Country: Switzerland
- Selection process: Concours Eurovision de la Chanson 1975
- Announcement date: 21 February 1975

Competing entry
- Song: "Mikado"
- Artist: Simone Drexel
- Songwriter: Simone Drexel

Placement
- Final result: 6th, 77 points

Participation chronology

Switzerland was represented at the Eurovision Song Contest 1975 with the song "Mikado", written and performed by Simone Drexel. The Swiss participating broadcaster, the Swiss Broadcasting Corporation (SRG SSR), selected its entry for the contest through a national final.

== Before Eurovision ==
=== Concours Eurovision de la Chanson 1975 ===
The Swiss Broadcasting Corporation (SRG SSR) held a national final to select its entry for the Eurovision Song Contest 1975. The broadcaster received 96 total song submissions, and ultimately selected seven to take part in the selection on December 10 and 11, with four being performed in French, two in Italian, and one in German. Among the participants was Peter, Sue & Marc— who represented Switzerland in 1971, and would repeat this in 1976, 1979, and 1981.

Swiss French broadcaster Télévision suisse romande (TSR) staged the national final on 12 February 1975 at 21:15 CET in Geneva. It was presented by Heidi Abel, Claude Evelyne, and Daniela Grigioni, with Roger Volet conducting the orchestra. The national final was broadcast on TV DRS, TSR, TSI and on radio station RSR 1.

Participating entries
Broadcaster	Artist(s)	Song	Songwriter(s)		Language
Broadcaster	Artist(s)	Song	Composer(s)	Lyricist	Language
TSR	Peter, Sue & Marc	"Lève-toi soleil"	Eric Merz; Peter Reber	Peter Reber	French
TSR	Henri	"Evasion"	Henri Huber		French
TSR	Pierre Alain	"Le chercheur d'or"	Pierre Alain	Christian Vellas	French
TSR	Gérald Matthey	"Chante avec nous"	Gérald Matthey	Jean-Jacques Egli	French
TSI	I Nuovi Angeli	"Liverpool"	Andreas Wyden		Italian
TSI	Marisa Frigerio	"Ricominciare"	Raffaele Gilardi	Marisa Frigerio	Italian
DRS	Simone Drexel	"Mikado"	Simone Drexel		German

The voting consisted of regional public votes which were sent to the three divisions of SRG SSR (DRS, TSR, TSI: German, French and Italian speaking, respectively) from February 12 to 16, a press jury, and a jury of music experts.

The results and winner were announced live on television on 21 February in Bern. The votes were delivered in rankings, rather than points. An estimate of 30,000 votes were cast by the public via postcard. For an unknown reason, the bottom four songs ranked by the press jury were converted into totals of 3. The winner was the song "Mikado" performed and written by Simone Drexel.

Final — 12 February 1975
R/O	Artist(s)	Song	Regional Juries			Press Jury	Expert Jury	Total	Place
R/O	Artist(s)	Song	DRS	TSR	TSI	Press Jury	Expert Jury	Total	Place
1	Peter, Sue & Marc	"Lève-toi soleil"	2	3	5	1	2	13	2
2	I Nuovi Angeli	"Liverpool"	4	6	3	3	7	23	5
3	Henri	"Evasion"	7	5	7	3 (Note: Originally ranked fourth, and would have had a total of 29 if unaltered)	6	28	7
4	Simone Drexel	"Mikado"	1	1	2	2	1	7	1
5	Pierre Alain	"Le chercheur d'or"	6	4	6	3 (Note: Originally ranked fifth, and would have had a total of 26 if unaltered)	5	24	6
6	Marisa Frigerio	"Ricominciare"	5	7	1	3 (Note: Originally ranked sixth, and would have had a total of 22 if unaltered)	3	19	4
7	Gérald Matthey	"Chante avec nous"	3	2	4	3 (Note: Originally ranked seventh, and would have had a total of 20 if unaltered)	4	16	3

=== Releases ===
Simone Drexel recorded and released "Mikado" in a titular single in 1975. She would also release the song in English and French that same year. In 1998, the song was featured in a CD compilation titled "Concours Eurovision De La Chanson 1956-1998: Schweizer Beiträge", which compiled every Swiss Eurovision entry at the time.

Most of the other songs from the selection were also commercially released, with the majority being released in 1975. Henri would not release "Evasion" until 2016 under his own modern arrangement, rather than that of Pierre Favre's in the selection. "Le chercheur d'or" by Pierre Alain has not been commercially released.

== At Eurovision ==
At the Eurovision Song Contest 1975, held at Sankt Eriks-Mässan in Stockholm, the Swiss entry was the seventh entry of the night following Norway and preceding Yugoslavia. The Swiss conductor at the contest was Peter Jacques. At the close of voting, Switzerland had received 77 points in total; finishing in sixth place out of nineteen countries.

The contest was broadcast on SRG SSR via TV DRS in German-speaking Switzerland, TSR (with commentary from Georges Hardy) and RSR 1 (with commentary from Robert Burnier) in Romandy, and TSI (Note: Delayed broadcast the following day at 15:15 (CET)) in Ticino.

=== Voting ===
Each participating broadcaster assembled a jury panel with at least eleven members. The jurors awarded 1-8, 10, and 12 points to their top ten songs. Until 1980, the votes were given in the order the awarded songs were performed in, rather than in ascending numerical order.

Points awarded to Switzerland
Score	Country
12 points	Italy
10 points	France
8 points	Belgium
7 points	Netherlands; Turkey
6 points	Germany; Malta
5 points	Monaco; United Kingdom
4 points	Finland
3 points	
2 points	Ireland; Luxembourg; Portugal
1 point	Norway

Points awarded by Switzerland
Score	Country
12 points	Finland
10 points	Italy
8 points	United Kingdom
7 points	Ireland
6 points	Netherlands
5 points	Spain
4 points	Malta
3 points	France
2 points	Israel
1 point	Sweden
