= Finland in the Eurovision Song Contest 1975 =

- Eurovision Song Contest 1975
- Participating broadcaster: Yleisradio (Yle)
- Country: Finland
- Selection process: National final
- Selection date: 8 February 1975

Competing entry
- Song: "Old Man Fiddle"
- Artist: Pihasoittajat
- Songwriters: Kim Kuusi; Arthur Ridgway Spencer; Hannu Karlsson

Placement
- Final result: 7th, 74 points

Participation chronology

Finland was represented at the Eurovision Song Contest 1975 with the song "Old Man Fiddle", composed by Kim Kuusi, with lyrics by Arthur Ridgway Spencer, and performed by the band Pihasoittajat. The Finnish participating broadcaster, Yleisradio (Yle), selected its entry through a national final.

== Before Eurovision ==
Yleisradio (Yle) invited 16 composers for the competition. The Finnish national selection consisted of four semi finals and a final. It was the first year the Finnish selection shows were broadcast in colour.

=== Semi-finals ===
The semi-finals were held on 4, 11, 18 and 25 January. Four songs were performed in each semi-final and a professional jury consisting eleven members chose two songs from each semi final to qualify for the final. After the semi-finals, a wildcard was also chosen for the final.

Semi-final 1 – 4 January 1975
R/O	Artist	Song	Songwriters	Place	Result
1	M. A. Numminen	"Voittolaulu"	Jorma Panula; M. A. Numminen	3	—N/a
2	Maarit	"Mätämakee"	Seppo Paakkunainen; Ritva Paakkunainen	1	Qualified
3	Ritva Oksanen	"Suuri naapuri"	Antti Hyvärinen; Jukka Virtanen	4	—N/a
4	Dans	"Hei lähde maailmaan"	Esko Linnavalli; Erkki Liikanen	2	Qualified

Semi-final 2 – 11 January 1975
R/O	Artist	Song	Songwriters	Place	Result
1	Kari Fall	"Maailman tie"	Kaj Backlund; Monica Aspelund	4	—N/a
2	Heikki Kinnunen	"Hyljätyn laulu"	Kaj Chydenius; Marja-Leena Mikkola	3	—N/a
3	Pepe Willberg	"Ovi elämään"	Markku Johansson; Vexi Salmi	1	Qualified
4	Marjatta Leppänen	"Naisen vuosi"	Jaakko Salo; Jukka Virtanen	2	Qualified

Semi-final 3 – 18 January 1975
R/O	Artist	Song	Songwriters	Place	Result
1	Mon-Ami	"Fasten Seatbelts"	Lasse Mårtenson; Jukka Virtanen	4	—N/a
2	Danny	"Seikkailija"	Kari Kuuva; Jyrki Hämäläinen	1 (Note: Yle's old article mentions that Pihasoittajat won the semi, while Yle Elävä arkisto's article mentions that Danny won the semi)	Qualified
3	Pihasoittajat	"Viulu-ukko"	Kim Kuusi; Hannu Karlsson	2	Qualified
4	Jukka Kuoppamäki	"Hyvästi ystäväni"	Jukka Kuoppamäki	3	—N/a

Semi-final 4 – 25 January 1975
R/O	Artist	Song	Songwriters	Place	Result
1	Agit Prop	"On jotain mikä yhdistää"	Henrik Otto Donner; Pentti Saaritsa	3	Wildcard
2	Tapani Kansa	"Luonnollisuus"	Rauno Lehtinen	4	—N/a
3	Vesa-Matti Loiri and Sivupersoonat	"Laulu"	Eero Koivistoinen; Juha Vainio	1	Qualified
4	Kirka and The Islanders	"Oh, New York rakkain"	Carita Holmström; Raul Reiman	2	Qualified

=== Final ===
Yle held the national final on 8 February at its television studios in Helsinki, hosted by Alpo "Apeli" Halinen. The winner was chosen by regional juries. Each jury group consisted of 15 members, and each juror distributed their points between 1–5 points for each song.

Final – 8 February 1975
R/O	Artist	Song	Points	Place
1	Pihasoittajat	"Viulu-ukko"	379	1
2	Marjatta Leppänen	"Naisen vuosi"	196	9
3	Agit Prop	"On jotain mikä yhdistää"	228	7
4	Maarit	"Mätämakee"	205	8
5	Dans	"Hei lähde maailmaan"	256	6
6	Vesa-Matti Loiri and Sivupersoonat	"Laulu"	308	3
7	Danny	"Seikkailija"	368	2
8	Pepe Willberg	"Ovi elämään"	279	4
9	Kirka and The Islanders	"Oh, New York rakkain"	265	5

Scoreboard
R/O	Song	Turku	Helsinki	Tampere	Mikkeli	Kuopio	Seinäjoki	Rovaniemi	Total
1	"Viulu-ukko"	48	55	54	46	58	57	61	379
2	"Naisen vuosi"	25	25	29	33	30	29	25	196
3	"On jotakin mikä yhdistää"	22	41	33	31	38	26	37	228
4	"Mätämakee"	34	28	30	32	23	29	29	205
5	"Hei lähde maailmaan"	42	38	32	38	28	38	40	256
6	"Laulu"	43	49	37	45	41	40	53	308
7	"Seikkailija"	54	49	55	60	50	53	47	368
8	"Ovi elämään"	30	48	42	43	44	39	33	279
9	"Oh, New York rakkain"	43	45	35	46	26	29	41	265

The winning song "Viulu-ukko" was performed in Finnish in the national selection shows but it was translated into English for the international Song Contest as "Old Man Fiddle".

== At Eurovision ==
On the night of the final Pihasoittajat performed 15th in the running order, following Monaco and preceding Portugal. The Finnish entry was conducted by Ossi Runne. At the close of voting, Finland picked up 74 points and placed 7th of the 19 entries.

Among the members of the Finnish jury were Tero Lehto, Merja Nyström, Ari Montonen and Hilkka Sokura.

=== Voting ===
Points awarded to Finland
Score	Country
12 points	Germany; Switzerland
10 points	Norway
8 points	Monaco; Israel
7 points	
6 points	Luxembourg
5 points	Ireland; Yugoslavia
4 points	United Kingdom
3 points	Sweden
2 points	
1 point	Spain

Points awarded by Finland
Score	Country
12 points	Italy
10 points	Netherlands
8 points	Spain
7 points	United Kingdom
6 points	Sweden
5 points	Luxembourg
4 points	Switzerland
3 points	Israel
2 points	Monaco
1 point	Ireland
