= Mats Olsson =

Mats Olsson may refer to:

- Mats Olsson (handballer) (born 1960), Swedish handball player
- Mats Olsson (musician) (1929–2013), Swedish musician
