= Ireland in the Eurovision Song Contest 1975 =

- Eurovision Song Contest 1975
- Participating broadcaster: Radio Telefís Éireann (RTÉ)
- Country: Ireland
- Selection process: Artist: Internal selection Song: National Song Contest
- Selection date: 9 February 1975

Competing entry
- Song: "That's What Friends Are For"
- Artist: The Swarbriggs
- Songwriters: Tommy Swarbrigg; Jimmy Swarbrigg

Placement
- Final result: 9th, 68 points

Participation chronology

Ireland was represented at the Eurovision Song Contest 1975 with the song "That's What Friends Are For", written and performed by The Swarbriggs. The Irish participating broadcaster, Radio Telefís Éireann (RTÉ), selected its entry through a national final, after having previously selected the performer internally.

== Before Eurovision ==
=== National Song Contest ===
==== Competing Entries ====
Radio Telefís Éireann (RTÉ) internally selected The Swarbriggs in October 1974 and opened song submissions. They received 335 entries from public submissions, 295 in English and 40 in Irish. RTÉ chose seven entries from the public submissions and another song was required to be composed by Tommy and Jimmy Swarbrigg, which was "That's What Friends Are For".

==== Final ====
RTÉ held the eleventh National Song Contest at its studios in Dublin, hosted by Mike Murphy. This was the first edition of the National Song Contest to be broadcast in colour. For a second year, RTÉ pre-selected their representatives and The Swarbriggs performed eight songs which were voted on by ten regional juries.

Final – 9 February 1975
R/O	Song	Points	Place
1	"This Is Our Very Own Song"	10	4
2	"Butterfly Morning"	1	8
3	"Bláithín"	3	6
4	"Lady in Blue"	6	5
5	"Come and Keep Me Warm"	19	3
6	"That's What Friends Are For"	36	1
7	"Baberó Dederó"	3	6
8	"Goodbye To Goodbye"	22	2

Detailed Regional Jury Votes
R/O	Song	Waterford	Castlebar	Birr	Tralee	Sligo	Cork	Cavan	Dublin	Letterkenny	Galway	Total
1	"This Is Our Very Own Song"		2	1	2	2	1				2	10
2	"Butterfly Morning"			1								1
3	"Bláithín"			1			1			1		3
4	"Lady In Blue"				1	3				2		6
5	"Come And Keep Me Warm"						5	1	4	5	4	19
6	"That's What Friends Are For"	5	7	7		5	1	6	3	2		36
7	"Baberó Dederó"								1		2	3
8	"Goodbye To Goodbye"	5	1		7		2	3	2		2	22

== At Eurovision ==
On the night of the final The Swarbriggs performed second in the running order, following the Netherlands and preceding France. At the close of voting "That's What Friends Are For" had picked up 68 points (including a maximum 12 from Belgium), placing Ireland 9th of the 19 entries.

=== Voting ===
Points awarded to Ireland
Score	Country
12 points	Belgium
10 points	Sweden
8 points	
7 points	Switzerland
6 points	France; Netherlands; United Kingdom
5 points	
4 points	Italy; Malta; Norway; Portugal
3 points	Spain
2 points	
1 point	Finland; Yugoslavia

Points awarded by Ireland
Score	Country
12 points	France
10 points	Luxembourg
8 points	Netherlands
7 points	Spain
6 points	Italy
5 points	Finland
4 points	Yugoslavia
3 points	United Kingdom
2 points	Switzerland
1 point	Israel
