= Simone Drexel =

Swiss singer and songwriter

Simone Drexel (born 13 May 1957 in St. Gallen) is a Swiss singer and songwriter.

In 1975 she represented Switzerland in the Eurovision Song Contest with her self penned entry Mikado which finished sixth on the night. In 1984, following the birth of her daughter, Drexel retired from the music industry and a year later she started working in Transfusion medicine.

In recent years Drexel has returned to the music industry as a music teacher, she is also the lead singer of the group Bluesonix.

Awards and achievements
Preceded by Piera Martell with "Mein Ruf nach dir"	Switzerland in the Eurovision Song Contest; 1975	Succeeded by Peter, Sue and Marc with "Djambo, Djambo"
