= Sweden in the Eurovision Song Contest 1975 =

- Eurovision Song Contest 1975
- Participating broadcaster: Sveriges Radio (SR)
- Country: Sweden
- Selection process: Melodifestivalen 1975
- Selection date: 15 February 1975

Competing entry
- Song: "Jennie, Jennie"
- Artist: Lasse Berghagen
- Songwriter: Lasse Berghagen

Placement
- Final result: 8th, 72 points

Participation chronology

Sweden was represented at the Eurovision Song Contest 1975 with the song "Jennie, Jennie", written and performed by Lasse Berghagen. The Swedish participating broadcaster, Sveriges Radio (SR), selected its entry through Melodifestivalen 1975. In addition, SR was also the host broadcaster and staged the event at the Sankt Eriks-Mässan in Stockholm, after winning the previous edition with the song "Waterloo" by ABBA.

== Before Eurovision ==
=== Melodifestivalen 1975 ===
Melodifestivalen 1975 was the selection for the 16th song to represent Sweden at the Eurovision Song Contest. It was the 15th time that Sveriges Radio (SR) used this system of picking a song. 10 songwriters were selected by SR for the competition. The final was held in the SR television studios in Gothenburg on 15 February 1975, presented by Karin Falck and was broadcast on TV1 but was not broadcast on radio.

R/O	Artist	Song	Songwriter(s)	Conductor	Points	Place
1	Landslaget	"Den gamla jukeboxen"	Lasse Lindbom	Bengt Palmers	47	7
2	Nils-Åke Runesson	"Oh, Juicy"	Nils-Åke Runesson	Lars Samuelson	25	10
3	Ann-Christine Bärnsten	"Ska vi plocka körsbär i min trädgård?"	Little Gerhard; Börje Carlsson	Alain Leroux	30	9
4	Hadar Kronberg with Glenmarks	"Lady Antoinette"	Hadar Kronberg	Bruno Glenmark	48	6
5	Lasse Berghagen	"Jennie, Jennie"	Lasse Berghagen	Lars Samuelson	117	1
6	Ted Gärdestad	"Rockin' 'n' Reelin'"	Ted Gärdestad; Kenneth Gärdestad	Sven-Olof Walldoff	47	7
7	Svenne and Lotta	"Bang en boomerang"	Benny Andersson; Björn Ulvaeus; Stig Anderson	Sven-Olof Walldoff	84	3
8	Björn Skifs	"Michelangelo"	Bengt Palmers; Björn Skifs	Bengt Palmers	55	5
9	Göran Fristorp	"Som min vän"	Göran Fristorp	Leif Strand	59	4
10	Gimmicks	"Sången lär ha vingar"	Bo Sylvén; Bo Carlgren	Lars Samuelson	93	2

=== Voting ===
R/O	Song	Luleå	Falun	Karlstad	Gothenburg	Umeå	Örebro	Norrköping	Malmö	Sundsvall	Växjö	Stockholm	Total
1	"Den gamla jukeboxen"	4		2	1	18	1	2		7	2	10	47
2	"Oh, Juicy"	2		1		5	5	1	6	3		2	25
3	"Ska vi plocka körsbär i min trädgård?"	1	1		3	4	4	5		3		9	30
4	"Lady Antoinette"	7	2	7		2	9	12	1	3	1	4	48
5	"Jennie, Jennie"	14	18	6	15	4	7	24	3	9	16	1	117
6	"Rockin' 'n' Reeling"	3	7	16	7	1		1	3	3	3	3	47
7	"Bang en boomerang"	7		8	5	8	16	5	14	1	15	5	84
8	"Michelangelo"	4	2	12	12	2	10		6	3	3	1	55
9	"Som min vän"	4	1	3	5	2		1	3	14	9	17	59
10	"Sången lär ha vingar"	9	24		7	9	3	4	19	9	6	3	93

== At Eurovision ==
At the ESC final in Stockholm, Berghagen performed 18th, and sang the song in English. This year, the 12 points voting system was for the first time in use. Berghagen did not receive any 12s (Sweden's highest score was 8 points from Norway and Turkey), but finished 8th (out of 19) with 72 points.

=== Voting ===
Points awarded to Sweden
Score	Country
12 points	
10 points	
8 points	Norway; Turkey
7 points	France; Luxembourg; United Kingdom
6 points	Finland; Monaco; Portugal; Yugoslavia
5 points	Spain
4 points	
3 points	Israel
2 points	Malta
1 point	Switzerland

Points awarded by Sweden
Score	Country
12 points	Netherlands
10 points	Ireland
8 points	France
7 points	Yugoslavia
6 points	Israel
5 points	United Kingdom
4 points	Luxembourg
3 points	Finland
2 points	Belgium
1 point	Italy
