= Renato Micallef =

Maltese singer

Nazzareno Alessandro Micallef Garrett, better known by his stage name Renato Micallef (born 19 November 1951) is a Maltese pop singer. Renato has been active in the Maltese music scene since the age of 12.

Renato has toured North America, Australia and the United Kingdom where his website claims he won an award for Singer Of The Year in 1980.

In 1975, he represented Malta in the Eurovision Song Contest, finishing in 12th place with Singing This Song. In 1990, he represented Malta again in the Cavan International Song Festival, with the song Our Little World of Yesterday, which won first prize.

He has also hosted his own Television and Radio including the popular Separju on Super One Radio and also toured with one of his favourite singers, Shirley Bassey. His record releases include Ave Maria and Lovin' You. Renato is also a very popular local entertainer and performs regularly in leading venues.

Awards and achievements
Preceded by Helen & Joseph with "L-imħabba"	Malta in the Eurovision Song Contest; 1975	Succeeded by Paul & Georgina with "Could It Be"
