= Wess =

American and Italian musician (1945–2009)

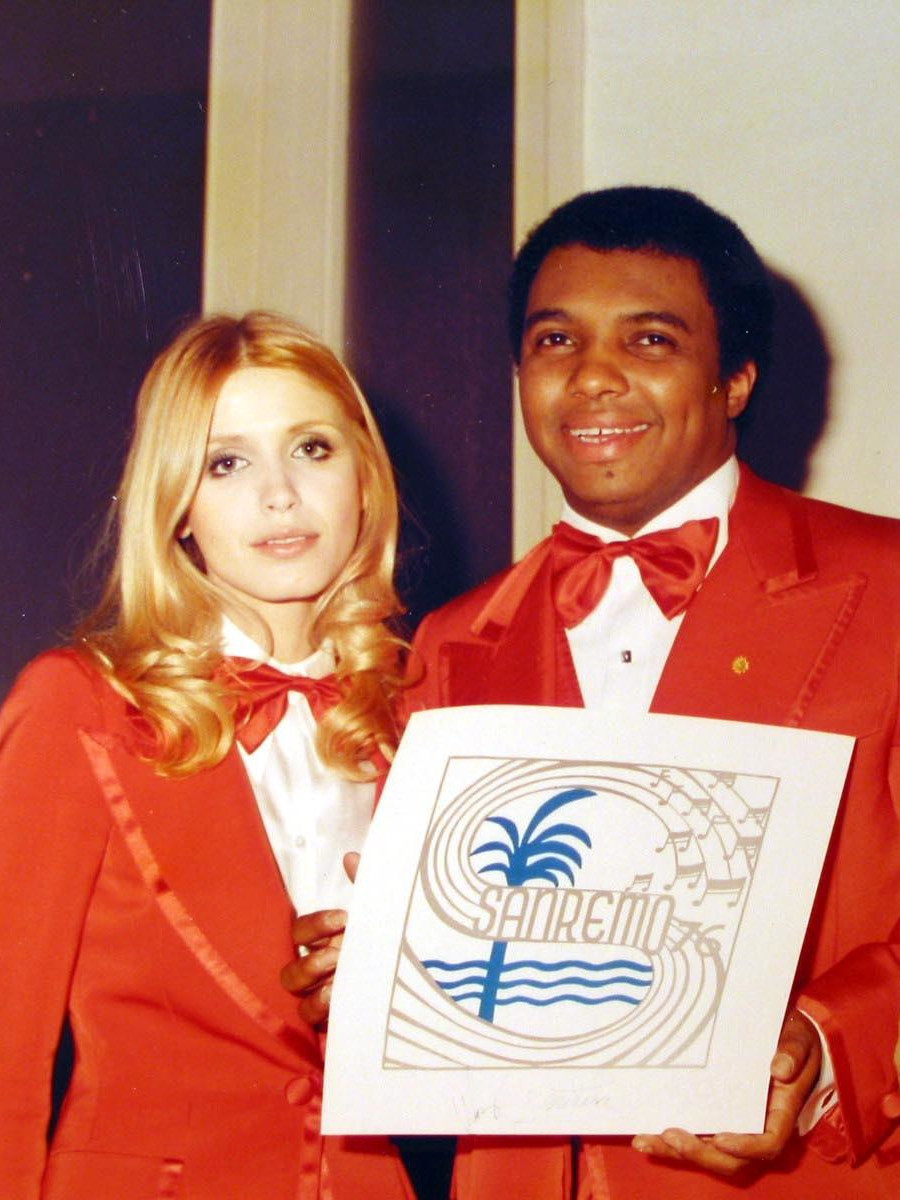
- Wess with Dori Ghezzi (Sanremo 1976)

Background information
- Born: Wesley Johnson; August 13, 1945; Winston-Salem, North Carolina, U.S.
- Died: September 21, 2009 (aged 64) Winston-Salem, North Carolina, U.S.
- Genres: Pop, soul
- Occupations: Singer, musician
- Instruments: Vocals, bass guitar
- Years active: 1964–2009
- Labels: Durium, London, UAR

Wesley Johnson (August 13, 1945 – September 21, 2009), known by his stage name Wess, was an American-born Italian singer and bass guitarist, perhaps mostly known for representing Italy along with Dori Ghezzi at the Eurovision Song Contest 1975 in Stockholm, Sweden, placing third with the song "Era".

Originally from North Carolina, Wess moved to Italy in the 1960s in pursuit of a musical career. He formed a successful duo with Ghezzi and achieved some hits in Italy, such as "Voglio stare con te", "Come stai? Con chi sei?" and "Un corpo e un'anima". Wess also was a singer and played bass guitar for the soul-funk band Wess & The Airedales in the 1960s and early 1970s.

== Personal life ==
Wess was the father of Deborah Johnson and UK-based R&B singer Romina Johnson, who often accompanied him as a backing singer. He died following a breathing crisis in his hometown of Winston-Salem in 2009, just one day after performing in New York City during a tour.

== In popular media ==
In its winter 2018 issue, Oxford American magazine published an essay about Johnson's life as a young performer in Winston-Salem, North Carolina, and how his earliest experiences affected his career in Italy.

== See also ==
- List of bass guitarists

Preceded by Gigliola Cinquetti	Italy in the Eurovision Song Contest; 1975 (with Dori Ghezzi)	Succeeded by Al Bano and Romina Power
