= Dick Bakker =

Dutch composer, conductor and music producer (born 1947)

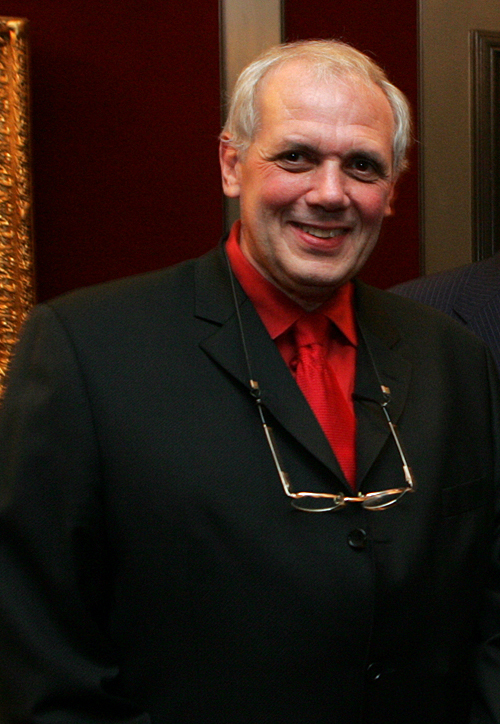

Dick Bakker (born 23 May 1947) is a Dutch composer, conductor and music producer. He succeeded Rogier van Otterloo as conductor of the Metropole Orkest, serving between 1991 and 2005.

Bakker composed the winning Eurovision Song Contest entry of 1975 for Teach-In. He has remained an associate with the Eurovision Song Contest and the Nationaal Songfestival, composing the Dutch entry for the 1982 Event sung by Bill van Dijk. He conducted three Dutch Eurovision entries, in 1996, 1997 and 1998. Bakker is a strong supporter of an orchestra's return to the contest.

Bakker has worked as a studio engineer and arranger for Falco (on "Garbo", 1988), Shocking Blue (on Venus), Rudi Carrell and Paloma Blanca.

== See also ==
- List of Eurovision Song Contest winners
- Metropole Orkest
- Netherlands in the Eurovision Song Contest
