= Joy Fleming =

German singer (1944–2017)

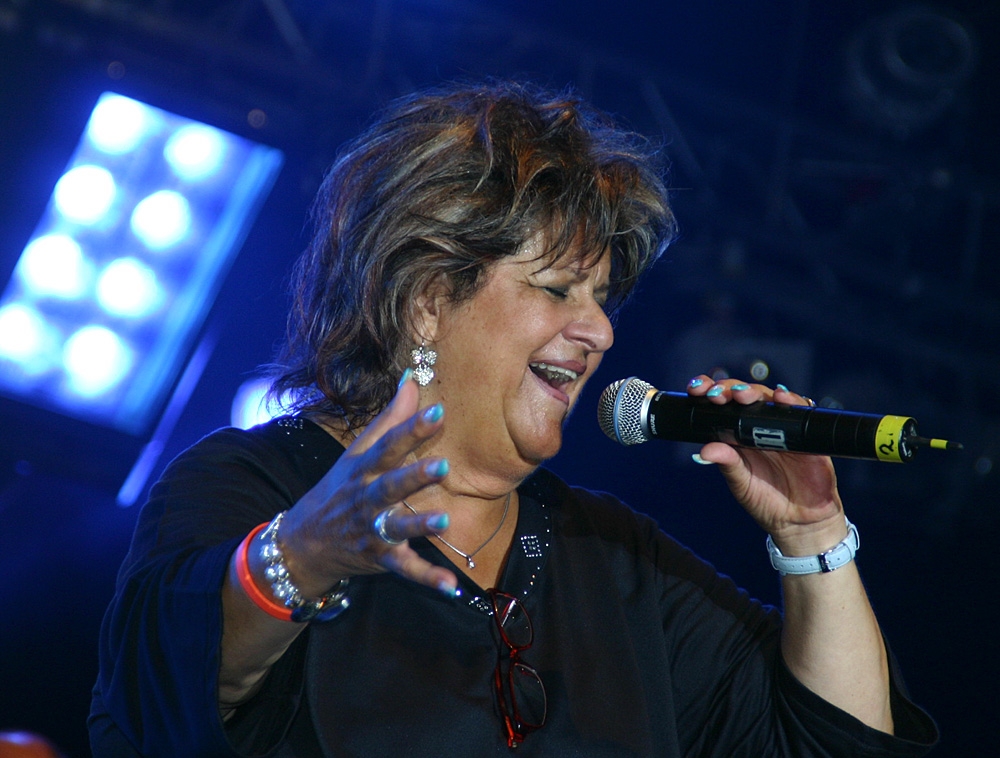
- Fleming in 2005

Background information
- Birth name: Erna Raad
- Also known as: Erna Libenow
- Born: 15 November 1944; Rockenhausen, Germany
- Died: 27 September 2017 (aged 72); Sinsheim, Germany
- Genres: Schlager; soul
- Occupation: Singer-songwriter

Joy Fleming (born Erna Raad, 15 November 1944 – 27 September 2017) was a German singer. She is best known for her performance in the Eurovision Song Contest in 1975. She performed the song "Ein Lied kann eine Brücke sein" and was placed seventeenth out of nineteen countries. Despite its relatively low placing, the song has become popular amongst many Eurovision fans.

She had a hit Disco record with the song and album "The Final Thing" in 1978 on Atlantic Records in the U.S. This was a covered song by the original artist Steve Bender (a member of the German Disco Group Dschinghis Khan) who also did the first version in 1976.

She made a further Eurovision bid in 1986, participating in the German national contest with the song "Miteinander". Her next involvement with Eurovision came in 2001 when, under a somewhat confusing arrangement with Swiss television she co-sang their contribution to the German final. The song, "Power of Trust" was performed with two other singers, Lesley Bogaert and Brigitte Oelke, and was placed second. Fleming made another attempt in 2002 and finished as runner-up yet again, this time performing "Joy to the World" with the group Jambalaya.

She died in her sleep in her home in Sinsheim on 27 September 2017.

Preceded by Cindy & Bert with Die Sommermelodie	Germany in the Eurovision Song Contest; 1975	Succeeded by Les Humphries Singers with Sing Sang Song
