= Nicole Rieu =

French singer

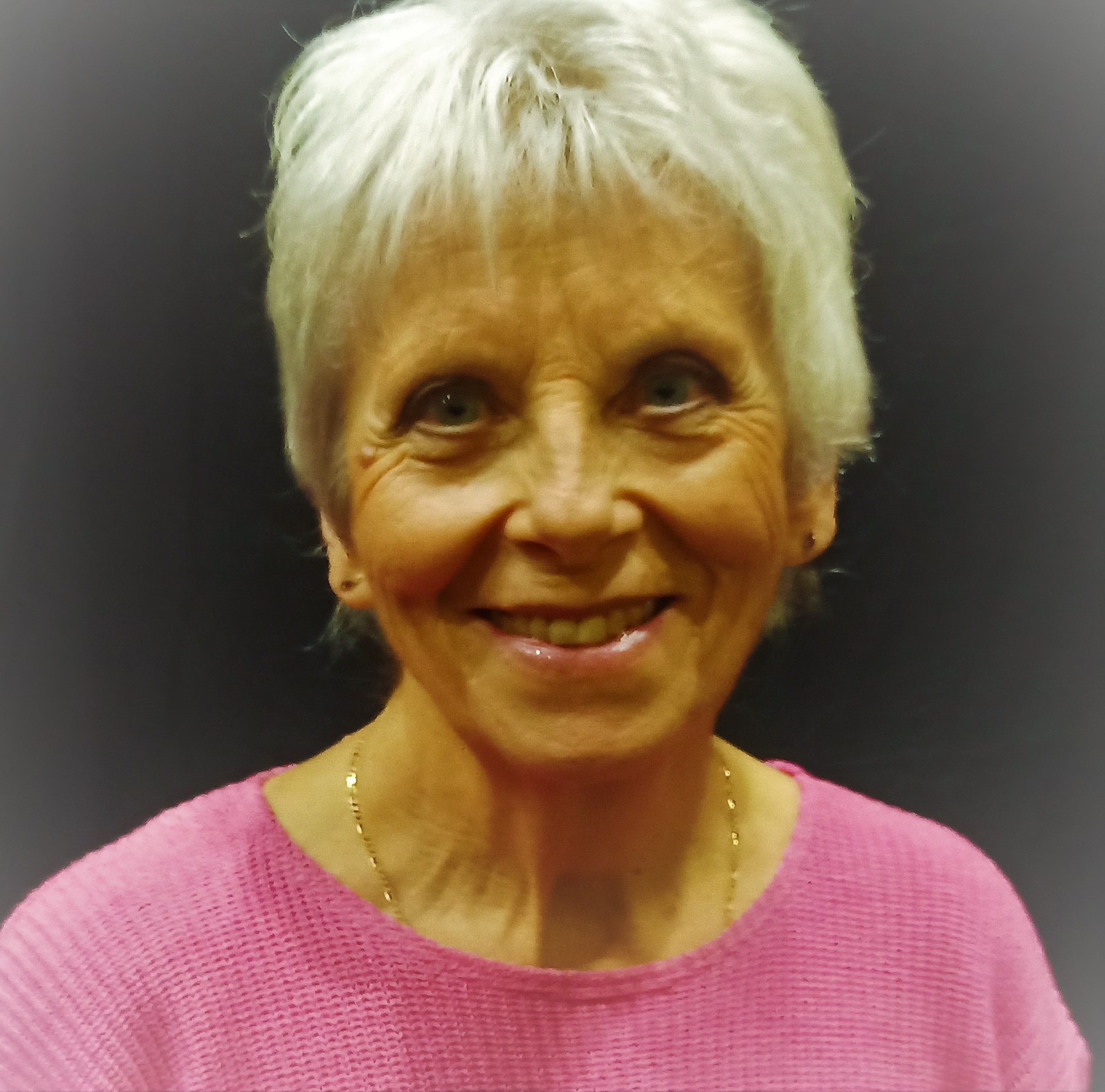

Background information
- Born: 16 May 1949 (age 76)
- Origin: Chaumont, Haute-Marne, France
- Genres: Pop
- Occupation: Singer
- Website: Nicole Rieu

Nicole Rieu (born 16 May 1949) is a French singer, best known outside France for her participation in the 1975 Eurovision Song Contest.

Rieu signed her first record contract with AZ Records in 1969. In 1973 she was spotted by the larger Barclay label, where she was offered a deal, and scored a hit with her first release "Je suis". In 1975, Rieu was chosen internally by channel TF1 as the French representative for the 20th Eurovision Song Contest with the Pierre Delanoë-penned song "Et bonjour à toi l'artiste". The contest was held on 22 March in Stockholm, and Rieu finished in fourth place of 19 entrants.

An English language version of the song with the title "Live for Love" and with lyrics by Lynsey de Paul was also released that was covered by Ben Thomas and released as a single later that year.

Rieu followed her Eurovision appearance with further successful singles such as "Je m'envole" and "En courant" (a French-language version of Diana Ross' "Theme from Mahogany") in 1976, "L'immigrant" (1977) and "La goutte d'eau" (1979). She took a career break of several years in the 1980s in order to concentrate on raising her son, since when she has continued to tour and release albums at sporadic intervals.

Preceded by Martine Clemenceau withSans toi	France in the Eurovision Song Contest; 1975	Succeeded by Catherine Ferry withUn, deux, trois
