= Bayzo =

Maltese singer

- Born: Tony Camilleri; 3 April 1947; St. Paul's Bay, Malta
- Died: 1 February 2018 (aged 70)
- Occupation: Singer
- Musical career
- Instrument: Vocals
- Years active: 1967–2018
- Labels: The Voice Of Friendship And Solidarity; Ministeru Ta' L-Affarijiet Barranin; Bonaci Brothers; Not On Label; N.D.P.C.

Bayzo (3 April 1947 – 1 February 2018) was a Maltese singer born in St. Paul's Bay. He is known for his unique voice and songs such as "Qalu li raw", which was played at the Malta Song Festival in 1986.

== Career ==
=== The Malta Bums ===
During his sixty-year-long career, he had been one of the main singers of The Malta Bums. His song L-Ewwel Tfajla li ħabbejt remains known.

Bayzo, along with Freddie Portelli, Paul Pirrone, Mario Pirrone, Tony Muscat and Tony Bartolo, and later member Freddie Scicluna were meeting in the fields of St Paul's Bay areas and singing. From there, The Malta Bums, originally known as The Bums, were founded.

With The Malta Bums, Bayzo lived and played in Germany for six months, where he originated Viva Malta at the end of 1967.

=== Festivals ===
After having been separated from the Malta Bums, he merged his group with Freddie Scicluna, Bayzo's Klikka, which was active in many hotels and nightclubs, and took part in numerous festivals and musicals.

He went to a tour in Australia, Canada and the United States, where he sang and played for Maltese emigrants.

He represented Malta in some contests, in which it took part in Poland and Slovakia.

=== Film ===
Bayzo was given a part in the RAI film "Cristoforo Colombo" (1984), parts of which were filmed in Malta and also in the Dominican Republic. Bayzo spent six weeks on this set, along with actors John Suda and Lino Mintoff.

=== Rock operas ===
He had taken part in Dream, the first rock opera from Malta, which first played at the Manoel Theatre in 1974.

In 1982, he was one of the singers of a popular rock opera in Malta known as The Lord, and was respected for his unique style as well as the meekness he always held.

== Awards ==
- 27 June 2013: l-Midalja Ġieħ San Pawl il-Baħar

== Death ==
The Labour Party considered the death of Bayzo as a major loss to the Maltese musical scene because for years, he was known as one of the main personages in the Maltese musical field. While they recalled his international performances which promoted Maltese music, it referred especially to Bayzo's performance in rock operas.
