= Geraldine Brannigan =

Irish singer (born 1954)

Geraldine Brannigan (sometimes listed as Geraldine Branagan; born 1954), known professionally as Géraldine, is an Irish singer, known for finishing in fifth place in the Eurovision Song Contest 1975 with the song "Toi" while representing Luxembourg.

== Career ==
Together with her band, she was active in the Irish showband scene. As Geraldine & the Brannigans they competed in the Irish preliminary to the Eurovision Song Contest 1973. Entitled Fadó Fadó/"Long, Long Ago" they finished in fourth place.

In 1978, as Geraldine & Pickles, Brannigan represented Ireland with the song Say It With Music at the Yamaha Music Festival in Tokyo.

Brannigan performed her single "Casablanca" (co-written by Martin & Coulter) in an episode of the Benny Hill Show shown on ITV in March 1979. The follow-up track, "Back Street Band" was featured on an episode of Juke Box Jury hosted by Noel Edmonds, shown on BBC 1 on 16 June 1979. The panel of Pete Murray, Bob Geldof, Linda Lewis and Isla St Clair voted it a 'miss'. Both tracks failed to chart in the UK despite the television exposure.

An album was released in 1981 (as The GB Band) in which her future husband Phil Coulter as a composer had participated.

She also toured South Africa in 1982 with guitarist Tony Cox.

=== Eurovision ===
As a solo singer, Brannigan was commissioned in 1975 by the broadcaster RTL to compete for Luxembourg at the 1975 Eurovision Song Contest in Stockholm. "Toi" was co-written by Irish singer-songwriter Phil Coulter, Scottish producer Bill Martin and French songwriter Pierre Cour. Coulter conducted the orchestra for the song, which came fifth. All three writers had written previous Eurovision winning songs (Martin & Coulter in 1967 and Cour in 1960).

== Personal life ==
In November 1998, Brannigan married her long-time partner Phil Coulter at Wicklow registry office, witnessed by their six children, Danielle, Dominique, Alexandra, Daragh, Ryan and Georgina, and 16 guests. Coulter had noticed Brannigan in a Guinness television advertisement in Dublin and felt that he had to meet her. He later said in an interview on Miriam Meets... on RTÉ Radio 1, that it was love at first sight.
