= Dori Ghezzi =

Italian singer (born 1946)

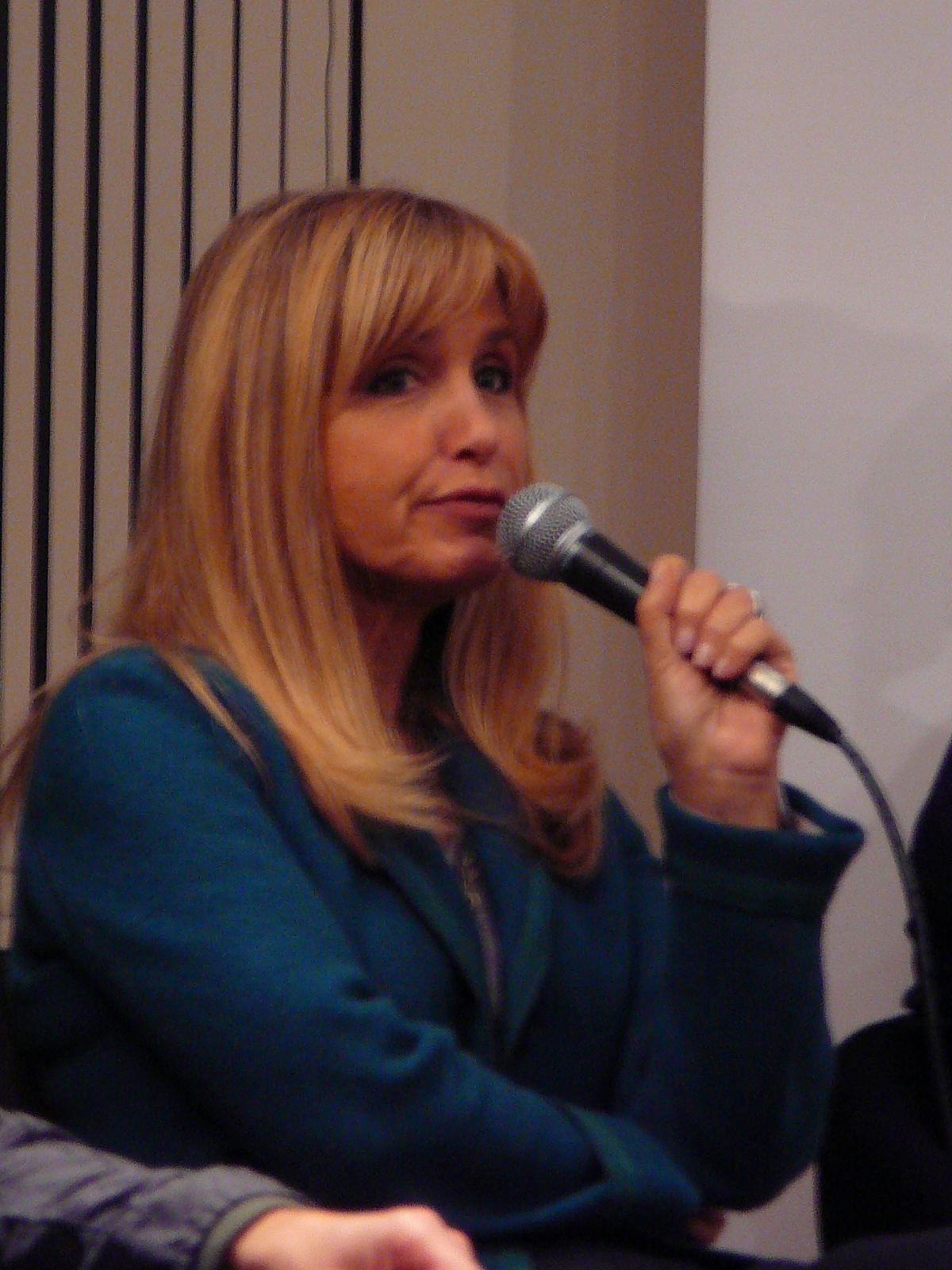
- Dori Ghezzi in 2008

Background information
- Born: 30 March 1946 (age 80)
- Origin: Lentate sul Seveso, Kingdom of Italy
- Genre: Pop
- Occupation: Singer
- Years active: 1966–1989
- Label: Durium
- Spouse: Fabrizio De André (m. 1989; died 1999)

Dori Ghezzi (born 30 March 1946) is an Italian singer who was active as a recording artist between 1966 and 1989. In the 1970s, Ghezzi worked mainly in a duo with American singer Wess, and the couple represented Italy in the Eurovision Song Contest 1975.

== Early career ==
Ghezzi was born in Lentate sul Seveso, in the province of Monza and Brianza.

After winning a regional song festival in 1966, Ghezzi was offered a recording contract with Milan-based record label Durium. In the following years, she released several successful singles, including "Vivere per vivere" and "Casatschock". Ghezzi made her first appearance in the Sanremo Festival in 1970, performing "Occhi a mandorla", a duet with Rossano, but the song failed to qualify for the final. In the period 1970–72, Ghezzi mainly recorded Italian cover versions of popular French and British songs of the time.

== With Wess ==
In 1972, Ghezzi's fellow Durium recording artist Wess suggested that the pair team up as a duo to record "Voglio stare con te", a version of the British hit "United We Stand". This proved a big chart success, and Durium proposed that Wess and Ghezzi become a regular recording partnership. Ghezzi had a solo album ready for release in 1973, which, along with a single "Adamo ed Eva", would be her last solo recording venture of the 1970s. Thereafter, Wess and Ghezzi became a successful and prolific duo, releasing seven albums and many singles before they parted ways in 1979. They took part in San Remo twice, coming sixth in 1973 ("Tu nella mia vita") and second in 1976 ("Come stai, con chi sei?").

== Eurovision Song Contest ==
In 1975, Wess and Ghezzi were chosen by broadcaster RAI to be Italy's representatives at that year's Eurovision Song Contest with the song "Era" ("It Was"). They went forward to the 20th Eurovision, held on 22 March in Stockholm, where "Era", an unusual song for Eurovision at the time, proved different enough to impress the voting juries and placed third in a field of 19.

== Kidnapping ==
In 1974, Ghezzi became the partner of singer Fabrizio De André, and the couple set up home in Sardinia, where Ghezzi had given birth to a daughter in 1977. On the evening of 27 August 1979, Ghezzi and De André were kidnapped by members of Sardinia's Anonima sequestri, and were held captive in the Supramonte mountains for almost four months before being released (Ghezzi on 21 December, De André the following day) on payment of a ransom, reportedly in the region of 500 million lire, believed to have been raised by De André's family. The pair subsequently stated that they had been well-treated by their captors; when the kidnappers were apprehended and put on trial, De André would show understanding and sympathy in his testimony.

== 1980s and retirement ==
Following the split from Wess, Ghezzi resumed her solo career in 1980 with the release of the album Mamadodori, dedicated to her daughter. Piccole donne followed in 1983, and the song "Margherita non lo sa" earned Ghezzi third place at that year's San Remo. 1987 saw the album Velluti e carte vetrate and 14th place at San Remo with "E non si finisce mai", while her last album Il cuore delle donne, the title track of which became Ghezzi's final San Remo entry (placing 16th), came in 1989. Ghezzi and De André married on 7 December 1989.

Ghezzi retired from her singing career on medical advice in 1990, having developed a serious problem with her vocal cords, and has since made only infrequent and secondary contributions to recordings by other artists. De André died of lung cancer in 1999 and Ghezzi has since dedicated herself to preserving and promoting his artistic heritage. She is the president of the Fondazione Fabrizio De André.

== Sanremo Music Festival entries ==
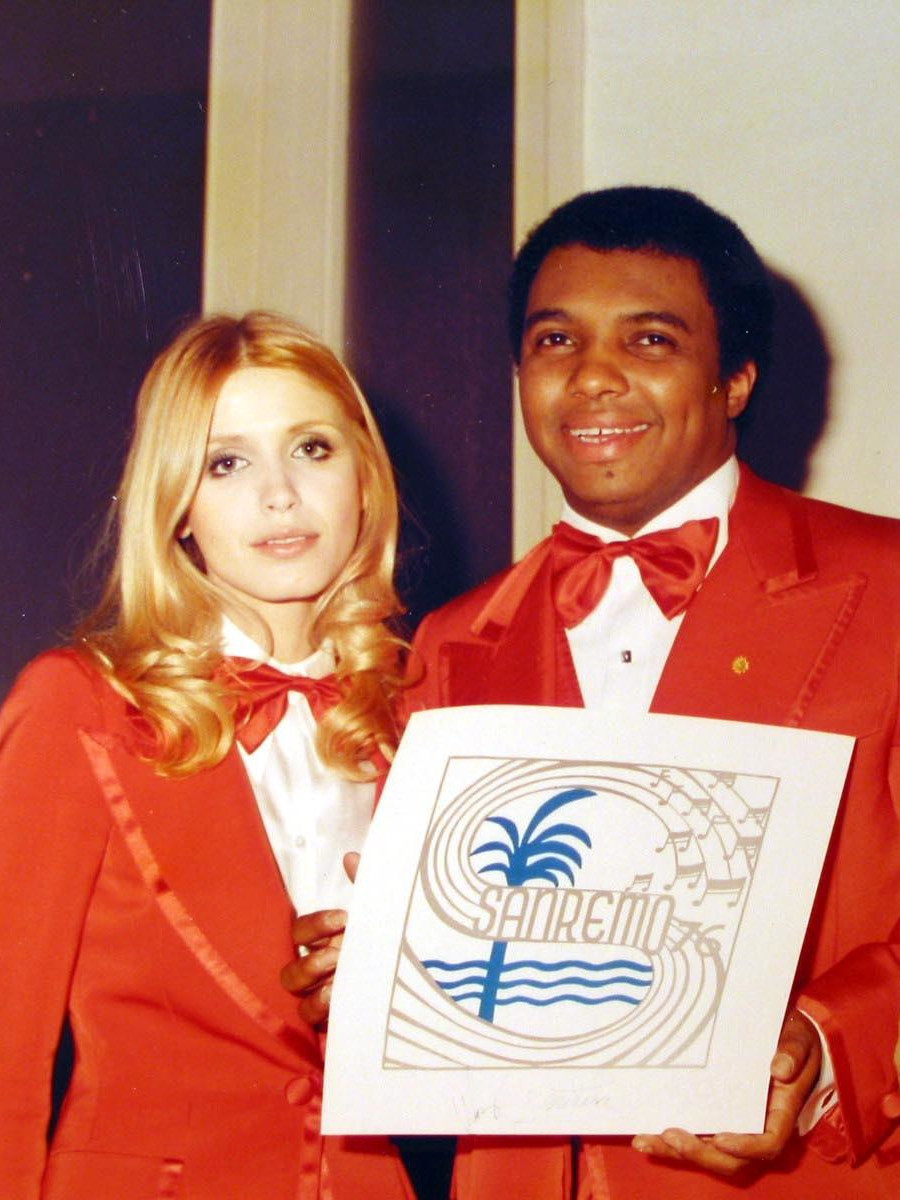
Ghezzi and Wess during the 1976 edition

- 1970: "Occhi a mandorla" (with Rossano) – Semi-final
- 1973: "Tu nella mia vita" (with Wess) – 6th
- 1976: "Come stai, con chi sei?" (with Wess) – 2nd
- 1983: "Margherita non lo sa" – 3rd
- 1987: "E non si finisce mai" – 14th
- 1989: "Il cuore delle donne" – 16th

== Discography ==
Solo albums

- Dori Ghezzi (1974)
- Casatschock (1979)
- Mamadodori (1980)
- Piccole donne (1983)
- Velluti e carte vetrate (1987)
- Il cuore delle donne (1989)

Albums with Wess

- Wess & Dori Ghezzi (1973)
- Un corpo e un'anima (1974)
- Terzo album (1975)
- Amore bellissimo (1976)
- I nostri successi (1976)
- Insieme (1977)
- In due (1979)
- Tu nella mia vita (2000)

Singles

- "Vivere pur vivere" (1967)
- "Pagina uno" (1968)
- "Isabelle" (1968)
- "Casatschock" (1968) – Italy #7
- "La mia festa" (1969)
- "Quello la" (1970)
- "Occhi a mandorla" (1970)
- "Gli occhi di quella" (1971)
- "Bluebirds Over the Mountain" (1971)
- "Ma chi e che cos'e" (1972)
- "Gira la ruota" (1972)
- "Adamo et eva" (1973)
- "Mamadodori" (1980) – Italy #33
- "Vola via" (1983)
- "Margherita non lo sa" (1983) – Italy #11
- "Nessuno mai piu" / "Spezzacuori" (1986) – Italy #46
- "Cercarti" (1987)
- "E non si finisce mai" (1987) – Italy #34
- "Il cuore delle donne" (1989) – Italy #19

== See also ==
- List of kidnappings
- List of solved missing person cases: 1950–1999

Preceded by Gigliola Cinquetti	Italy in the Eurovision Song Contest; 1975 (with Wess)	Succeeded by Al Bano and Romina Power
