= Mats Olsson (musician) =

Swedish musician, arranger and conductor of popular music

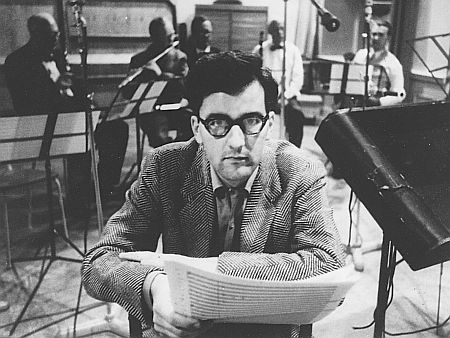
Mats Olsson (musician)

Mats Olsson (3 November 1929 – 11 September 2013) was a Swedish musician.

Olsson was a prominent arranger and conductor of popular music. He was the musical director for the Swedish national final of the Eurovision Song Contest on multiple occasions in the 1960s and 1970s. He was the conductor for the Swedish ESC entries in 1967, 1968 and 1972; as well as musical director of the Eurovision Song Contest 1975. He died on 11 September 2013, aged 83.

Preceded by (United Kingdom) Ronnie Hazlehurst	Eurovision Song Contest conductor 1975	Succeeded by (Netherlands) Jan Stulen
