= Eddy Ouwens =

Dutch musician and record producer

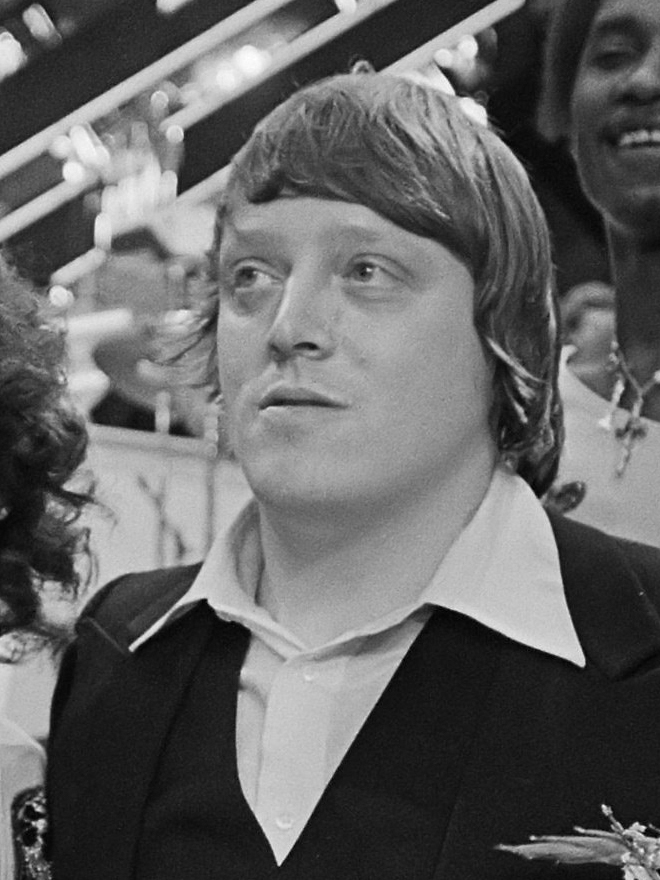
Eddy Ouwens (1978)

Eddy Ouwens (born 30 May 1946, Rotterdam), also known as Danny Mirror, is a Dutch musician and record producer.

== Overview ==
He was a founder member in 1966 of the Rotterdam-based group, Eddy Nelson & the Eddysons. After a few hits he left to work as a producer and produced Teach-In (band), Bolland & Bolland and The Shoes. In 1970, he released the single, "Everybody's Nobody" / "Every Little Sigh Becomes a Lie", under the name Eddy Owens.

Ouwens co-wrote the Netherlands Eurovision Song Contest entries in 1975 ("Ding-A-Dong" performed by Teach-In), and 1978 ("'t Is OK" performed by Harmony).

In August 1977, following the death of Elvis Presley, he recorded and released the single "I Remember Elvis Presley (The King Is Dead)" as his tribute to the departed 'King'. It spent nine weeks on the UK Singles Chart and peaked at number four. In his native Netherlands, the record made number one.

To extend this success, Ouwens invited The Jordanaires, Presley's original backing vocalists, to record a medley album of 50 Presley songs. It was released in 1981 under the name of 'Danny Mirror & The Jordanaires'.
