= Teach-In (band) =

1970s Dutch band

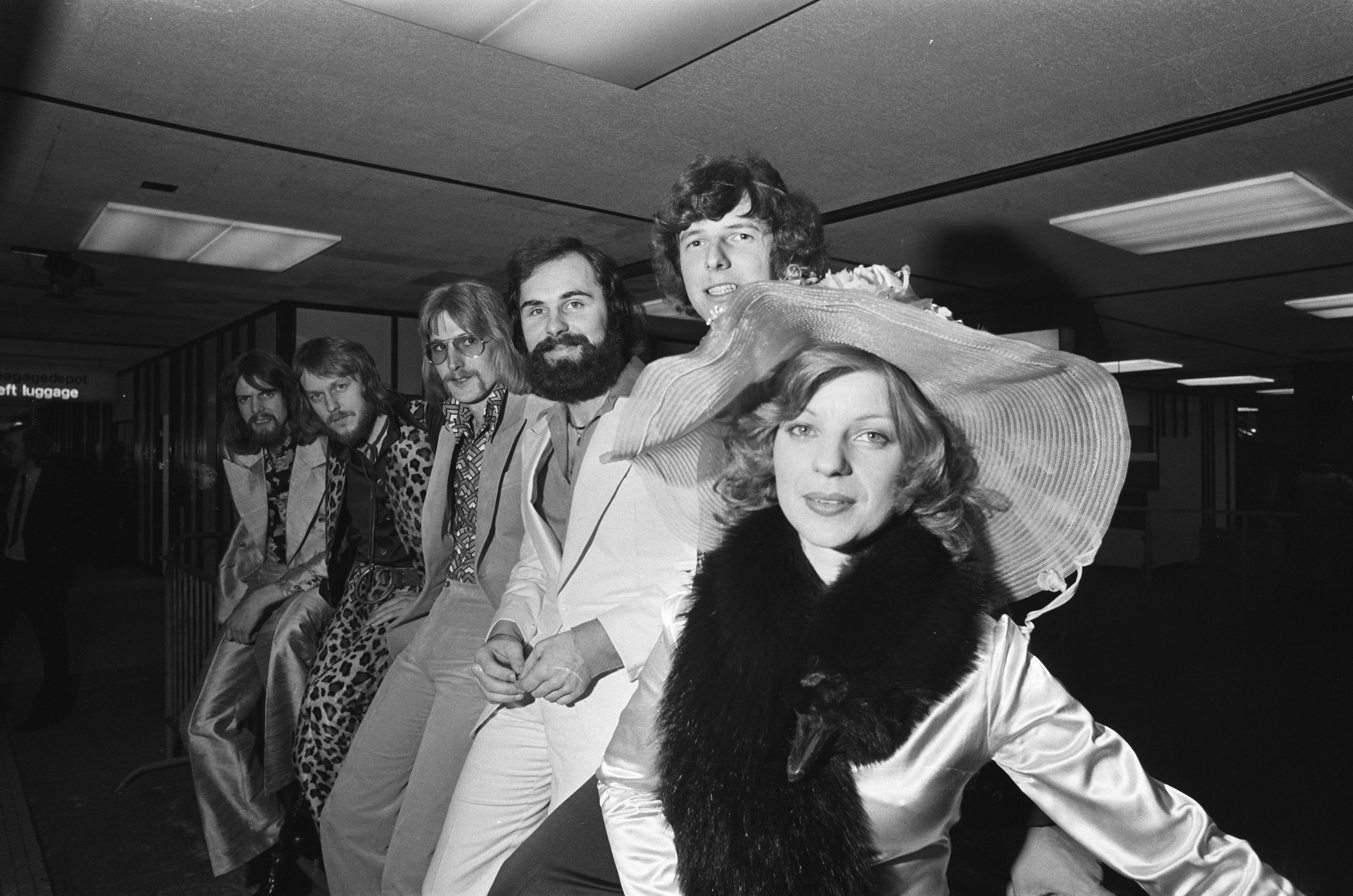
- Teach-In in 1975

Background information
- Origin: Enschede, Netherlands
- Genres: Pop
- Years active: 1967–1980, 2007, 2021
- Members: Koos Versteeg; Rudi Nijhuis; Stora Combo; Chris De Wolde; Betty Vermeulen; Marianne Wolsink; Nick de Vos
- Past members: Hilda Felix; Henk Westendorp; John Snuverink; Frans Schaddelee; Getty Kaspers; John Gaasbeek; Ard Weeink; Hans Nijland

Teach-In was a Dutch band active from 1967 until 1980. After scoring several top 20 hits in their home country by the early 1970s, the band came to international attention by winning the Eurovision Song Contest 1975 with the song "Ding-a-dong”. Throughout the band's career, there were several changes in line-up.

== History ==
=== 1967–1969: Foundation and early steps ===
Teach-In was formed in 1967 in Enschede. The first lineup: Hilda Felix (vocals), Henk Westendorp (vocals, later in Superfly), John Snuverink (vocals, guitar), Frans Schaddelee (bass), leader Koos Versteeg (vocals & keys) and Rudi Nijhuis (drums).

=== 1970s: Peak, changes and Eurovision victory ===
==== 1970–1974: Fly Away / In the Summernight ====
In 1971, only Koos and Rudi remained in Teach-In, and the rest of the band comprised Getty Kaspers (vocals, in 1976 solo as Getty), John Gaasbeek (bass, already in 1964 in the Stora Combo (later known as Orkest Freddie Golden, he also left in 1976), Chris De Wolde (guitar) and Ard Weeink (also until 1976). A recording contract was signed with CNR Records and Eddy Ouwens became their producer and co-composer.

Teach-In's first single was "Spoke the Lord Creator" (originally a song by Focus), released in 1972, which didn't chart.

In 1974 Teach-In had three top 15 hits in the Netherlands: "Fly Away", "In the Summernight" and "Tennessee Town". In the Summernight also reached number 5 in a South African charts.

==== 1975: Ding-a-dong / Goodbye Love ====
In March 1975, Teach-In participated in the Eurovision Song Contest 1975 with the song "Ding-a-dong" (written by Will Luikinga and Eddy Ouwens) and won. Teach-In broke a Eurovision convention that favours songs performing later in the program by winning the contest despite performing first. This was a first for the competition and was repeated a year later by Brotherhood of Man in the Eurovision Song Contest 1976. This feat has only been repeated by one further act; the Herreys in 1984. "Ding-a-Dong" had a chart entry in nearly every European country, as well as a number 22 placing in the USA on the Easy Listening chart. In the Netherlands it reached number 3 in the charts.

In October 1975 "Goodbye Love" became another Dutch top 10-hit.

==== 1976–1979: Upside Down / Dear John ====
"Rose Valley", released in February 1976, reached just the top 20. Tensions due to the busy concert scheme made Getty Kaspers leave the band, after which she pursued a solo career. Also John Gaasbeek and Ard Weeink quit. Hans Nijland (bass, in 1977 replaced by Nick de Vos), Betty Vermeulen (vocals), Marianne Wolsink (vocals, ex-Head) were included as new members. The group's next single "Upside Down" reached number 2 in the Netherlands.

In 1978 the Disco rage nearly destroyed Teach-In's popularity. A new look and sound had to be adopted and "Dear John" became a top 10 hit in October. John in this song is John Travolta, who they ask to teach them to dance. In 1979 a theme song for a Dutch TV charity show supporting Greenpeace hit the top 10.

In June 1979, two ex-members of Teach-In, Getty and John Gaasbeek, joined by Wilma van Diepen, formed the Balloon trio. Later on, Getty tried a new solo career, recording a couple of discs including the Getty Album. The Getty Album features De eerste liefde is een feest with lyrics in Dutch, originally När du tar mig i din famn/The Queen of Hearts by Agnetha Fältskog in Swedish and English. Getty's vocals can also be heard on Rick van der Linden's Cum Laude album and on recordings made by Radio Veronica.

=== 1980–2021: Disbandonment and reunifications ===
1980's single "Regrets" proved to be the Teach-In's swan song as the group disbanded soon after.

In 1997, news came that the original line up (with Getty Kaspers) had re-recorded some of their old hits and had plans to tour again.

Teach-In reunited to sing "Ding-a-Dong" at a show in Maastricht on 31 August 2007.

The band reunited to perform at the final of the Eurovision Song Contest 2021 as an interval act.

== Discography ==
=== Studio albums ===
Year	Title	Details	Peak chart positions
Year	Title	Details	NL
1974	Roll Along	Released: 1974; Label: CNR	—
1975	Festival	Released: March 1975; Label: CNR	8
1976	Get On Board	Released: 1976; Label: CNR	—
1977	See the Sun	Released: 1977; Label: Negram	—
1979	Teach In	Released: 1979; Label: CNR	—
1980	Room 115	Released: 2018; Label: Red Bullet	—
"—" denotes releases that did not chart.

=== Compilation albums ===
Year	Title	Details
1975	Our Sings	Released: 1975; Label: Telefunken; Germany-only release
1991	Ding-A-Dong	Released: 1991; Label: EMI
1991	The Original Teach In Hit Collection	Released: 1991; Label: PPF
1992	The Very Best Of	Released: 1992; Label: Diamond
2005	Teach In	Released: 2005; Label: CNR Music
2010	Best of Teach In	Released: 26 April 2010; Label: Red Bullet

=== Singles ===
Year	Single	Peak chart positions														
Year	Single	NL 40	NL 100	BE (FLA)	BE (WA)	FRA	GER	IRE	NOR	SPA	SA	SWE	SWI	UK	US AC	ZIM
1971	"Spoke the Lord Creator (Chorale St. Anthony's)"	— (Note: "Spoke the Lord Creator (Chorale St. Anthony's)" didn't enter the Dutch Top 40, but did peak at number 2 on the Tipparade.)	—	—	—	—	—	—	—	—	—	—	—	—	—	—
1971	"Can't Be So Bad"	—	—	—	—	—	—	—	—	—	—	—	—	—	—	—
1972	"So Easy to Sing (Cord di Schiavi Ebrei)"	—	—	—	—	—	—	—	—	—	—	—	—	—	—	—
1974	"Fly Away"	5	6	8	49	—	—	—	—	—	—	—	—	—	—	1
1974	"In the Summernight"	5	3	3	44	—	—	—	—	—	5	—	—	—	—	19
1974	"Tennessee Town"	13	9	22	—	—	—	—	—	—	—	—	—	—	—	—
1975	"Ding-A-Dong"	3	3	2	7	4	9	8	1	3	—	4	1	13	22	13
1975	"Goodbye Love"	5	5	18	48	—	—	—	—	—	—	—	—	—	—	—
1975	"Rose Valley"	17	19	13	—	—	—	—	—	—	—	—	—	—	—	—
1976	"Upside Down"	2	3	1	24	—	—	—	—	—	—	—	—	—	—	—
1977	"A Ride in the Night"	31	— (Note: "A Ride in the Night" did enter the Dutch Single Top 100 (then a Top 30), but did peak at number 7 on the Single Tip chart.)	—	—	—	—	—	—	—	—	—	—	—	—	—
1977	"See the Sun"	26	26	—	—	—	—	—	—	—	—	—	—	—	—	—
1977	"(Do You Wanna Play) My Rock and Roll Song"	— (Note: "(Do You Wanna Play) My Rock and Roll Song" didn't enter the Dutch Top 40, but did peak at number 5 on the Tipparade.)	—	—	—	—	—	—	—	—	—	—	—	—	—	—
1978	"Dear John"	5	5	2	—	—	22	—	—	—	—	20	—	—	—	—
1979	"The Robot"	20	16	18	—	—	—	—	—	—	—	—	—	—	—	—
1979	"Greenpeace"	10	5	30	—	—	—	—	—	—	—	—	—	—	—	—
1980	"Regrets"	— (Note: "Regrets" didn't enter the Dutch Top 40, but did peak at number 6 on the Tipparade.)	31	—	—	—	—	—	—	—	—	—	—	—	—	—
1980	"Bad Day"	—	—	—	—	—	—	—	—	—	—	—	—	—	—	—
"—" denotes releases that did not chart or were not released in that territory.

== Notes ==
Awards and achievements
Preceded by (Sweden) ABBA with "Waterloo"	Winner of the Eurovision Song Contest; 1975	Succeeded by (United Kingdom) Brotherhood of Man with "Save Your Kisses for Me"
Preceded by Mouth & MacNeal with "I See A Star"	Netherlands in the Eurovision Song Contest; 1975	Succeeded by Sandra Reemer with "The Party's Over"
