= Era (song) =

Eurovision song by Wess & Dori Ghezzi

Single by Wess and Dori Ghezzi

from the album Wess & Dori
- Language: Italian
- Released: 1975
- Genre: pop
- Label: Durium
- Songwriters: Shel Shapiro; Andrea Lo Vecchio

Wess and Dori Ghezzi singles chronology
"Un corpo e un'anima" (1974)	"Era" (1975)	"È l'amore che muore" (1975)

Music video
- "Era" on YouTube

Eurovision Song Contest 1975 entry
- Country: Italy
- Artists: Wess and Dori Ghezzi
- As: Wess & Dori Ghezzi
- Language: Italian
- Composer: Shel Shapiro
- Lyricist: Andrea Lo Vecchio
- Conductor: Natale Massara

Finals performance
- Final result: 3rd
- Final points: 115

Entry chronology
- ◄ "Sì" (1974)
- "We'll Live It All Again" (1976) ►

"Era" (English translation: "It Was") was the Italian entry in the Eurovision Song Contest 1975, composed by British-Italian singer-songwriter Shel Shapiro (born David Norman Shapiro, formerly of The Rokes and Colin Hicks & The Cabin Boys) and Andrea Lo Vecchio, and performed in Italian by American-born singer Wesley Johnson, known as Wess, and Italian Dori Ghezzi.

== Background ==
Starting with "Voglio stare con te", an Italian version of Brotherhood of Man's hit "United We Stand", in the 1970s Wess and Dori Ghezzi enjoyed a number of hits, notably "Tu nella mia vita" and "Con chi stai con chi sei". They were chosen to represent Italy at Eurovision following their victory at Canzonissima with the song "Un corpo e un'anima".

== At Eurovision ==
The song was performed nineteenth on the night, following Sweden's Lars Berghagen with "Jennie, Jennie"). At the close of voting, it had received 115 points, placing it 3rd in a field of 19.

It was succeeded as Italian representative at the 1976 contest by Al Bano & Romina Power with "We'll Live It All Again".

== Other versions ==
The duo also recorded the song in English ("Fallin'"), French ("Qui vivra verra") and Spanish ("Era").

Among the artists who covered the song, Bessy Argyraki and Robert Williams recorded a Greek version titled "Μόνο".

== Charts ==
Chart (1975)	Peak position
Italy (Musica e dischi)	12
Norway (VG-lista)	3
Netherlands (Dutch Top 40)	20
Netherlands (Single Top 100)	23
Switzerland (Schweizer Hitparade)	6
