= Belgium in the Eurovision Song Contest 1963 =

- Eurovision Song Contest 1963
- Participating broadcaster: Belgische Radio- en Televisieomroep (BRT)
- Country: Belgium
- Selection process: Canzonissima 1963
- Selection date: 16 February 1963

Competing entry
- Song: "Waarom?"
- Artist: Jacques Raymond
- Songwriters: Hans Flower; Wim Brabants

Placement
- Final result: 10th, 4 points

Participation chronology

Belgium was represented at the Eurovision Song Contest 1963 with the song "Waarom?", composed by Hans Flower with lyrics by Wim Brabants, and performed by Jacques Raymond. The Belgian participating broadcaster, Dutch-speaking Belgische Radio- en Televisieomroep (BRT), selected its entry through a national final. Raymond had previously finished second in the 1961 national final, and would later represent the country in a duet with Lily Castel in 1971.

== Before Eurovision ==
=== Canzonissima ===
Canzonissima was the national final format developed by Dutch-speaking broadcaster Belgische Radio- en Televisieomroep (BRT) which determined the song that would represent Belgium at the Eurovision Song Contest 1963. The competition consisted of nine semi-finals held between October 1962 and February 1963, and a final on 16 February 1963.

Canzonissima 1963 was the first of four series of the show, with seasons in 1966–1967, 1967–1968, and 1970–1971. The 1966–1967 and 1970–1971 editions of the show acted as BRT's national final for the Eurovision Song Contest in their respective years. The Canzonissima format would also inspire the format for Eurosong 1975, the first edition of Eurosong – the long-term Dutch-speaking selection for the Eurovision Song Contest.

==== Format ====
Canzonissima 1963 consisted of nine semi-finals and final. Each semi-final consisted of twelve songs which would be scored by a jury panel and through audience voting. The top three songs from each semi-final qualified to the next semi-final, whilst the remaining songs would be eliminated and be replaced with new songs in the next semi-final. For a song to qualify to the final, it would have to finish in the top three in three consecutive semi-finals.

Since songs introduced in semi-finals 8 and 9 could not participate in three semi-finals, the rules for qualification were changed in semi-final 9. Instead, songs would have to get more than the average number of points that every song that qualified to the final got in their last semi-final.

==== Competing entries ====
Twelve artists, chosen by BRT, competed in Canzonissima 1963: Bob Benny, Chris Ellis, Enny Denita, Freddy Sunder, Jacques Raymond, Jean Walter, Jo Leemans, Lieve Olga, Lize Marke, Rina Pia, Staf Wesenbeek, and Will Ferdy. However, a list published by Brugsch Handelsblad prior to the start of the first show claimed that Chris Wijnen would compete, instead of Bob Benny.

BRT opened submission periods for interested composers for all nine semi-finals separately. The submission deadline for each semi-final was 21 days prior to the airing of that semi-final. All submissions had to be anonymous (the names of the songwriter(s) of an entry were only revealed after a song was chosent to compete), include the lyrics and at least a piano score of the song, not have been published beforehand, and had to last no longer than 3½ minutes. A total of 88 songs were chosen to compete in Canzonissima 1963.

The songwriter(s) of a song were allowed to pick which of the twelve artists they would like to perform their song. However, BRT did not always follow the songwriter(s) recommendation. If a songwriter did not specify an artist then the same jury that chose the competing entries would select an artist for them.

Competing entries and respective performers (in the semi-finals)
Artist	Song	Songwriter(s)	
Artist	Song	Composer(s)	Lyricist(s)
Bob Benny	"Dans een polka"	A. Vetsy	Frankie Woods
Bob Benny	"Estramadura"	P. Vanondzeil	Yvonne Lex
Bob Benny	"Kleine blauwe zwaluw"	Clem De Ridder	Armand Preud'homme
Bob Benny	"Mia bella Marinella"	Fer Roes	
Bob Benny	"Morgen is 't weer vakantietijd"	Jacques Raymond; Ronny Clarck	Jacques Raymond
Bob Benny	"Twee harten"	Henri Wolfaert	
Bob Benny	"Van hart tot hart"	And. Simons	
Chris Ellis	"Geen eigenwijze nozem"	Leon van Ingelgem	Hektor van den Eede
Chris Ellis	"In de lente van mijn leven"	André Frère	
Chris Ellis	"In Shangai"	Ernie Frank; Noel Lambré	
Chris Ellis	"Paris"	Roger Snoeck	Ke Riema
Chris Ellis	"Toen... werd ik verliefd"	C. Knegtel; Louis Baret; Louis van Rymenant	
Chris Ellis	"Veel mooier"	Jean Marryn	M. Demil
Enny Denita	"De eerste melodie"	Nelly D'Hondt	Frans Buermans
Enny Denita	"Heimwee naar mijn dorpje"	Armand Beliën	Maurits Willems; Hellemans
Enny Denita	"Laat ons dromen"	Jean Corti	Leopold Loos
Enny Denita	"Leugens"	Aimé Demuydt; Marcel Hellemans	Marcel Hellemans
Enny Denita	"Mijn droom is voorbij"	Omer de Cock	Frans Buermans
Enny Denita	"Song festival"	Dave Baker; Marcel Hellemans	Marcel Hellemans
Enny Denita	"Verlangen"	Marcel Hellemans	Henk van Montfoort
Enny Denita	"Wanneer de rozen bloeien"	Hans Flower	Clem De Ridder
Freddy Sunder	"De lente in mijn hart"	Cl. Moreau	Frankie Woods
Freddy Sunder	"Dingen waarvan ik veel hou"	M. van der Linden	
Freddy Sunder	"Namanouito"	Roger Snoeck	Ke Riema
Freddy Sunder	"O wist je"	L. Logie	
Freddy Sunder	"Ontrouw"	Freddy Sunder	François Vermetten
Jacques Raymond	"De oude berkenboom"	Guido Van Hove	Emiel Van Hove
Jacques Raymond	"Denk steeds aan mij"	A. Gork	E. Nelly
Jacques Raymond	"Het beloofde land"	Paul Quintens	Phil van Cauwenbergh
Jacques Raymond	"Het geluk"	A. Van Steyvoort; L. Van Steyvoort	
Jacques Raymond	"Illusie"	Jacques Raymond; Ronny Clarck	Jacques Raymond
Jacques Raymond	"Fata morgana"	L. van Rymenant; Jef Van den Berg	Ernie Sons
Jacques Raymond	"Langs de blauwe wegen"	Jef Van den Berg	Valeer Van Kerckhoven
Jacques Raymond	"Romantiek"	Val Dewaert	
Jacques Raymond	"Voorbij"	Jef Van den Berg	Henk van Montfoort
Jacques Raymond	"Waarom?"	Hans Flower	Clem De Ridder
Jean Walter	"Als je lacht... (ben je veel mooier)"	Jef Van den Berg	Leonard van Dijck
Jean Walter	"Belinda"	Al Van Dam; Jean Walter	Louis Baret
Jean Walter	"Blauw, blauw"	A. Vetsy	Frankie Woods
Jean Walter	"De gouden wals"	Paul Bouveroux	Clem De Ridder
Jean Walter	"Erna"	Hans Flower	Co Flower
Jean Walter	"Hello aardig meisje"	Wilfried De Puydt	
Jean Walter	"Op mijn schildersatelier"	Jef Van den Berg	
Jean Walter	"Snel gaat de tijd"	Jean Walter; Willy Albimoor; Ke Riema	
Jean Walter	"Stof en as"	Hans Flower	Frans Buermans
Jo Leemans	"'k Ben zo gelukkig"	Jef Van den Berg	Henk van Montfoort
Jo Leemans	"Een lied"	Paul Quintens	Phil Van Cauwenbergh
Jo Leemans	"Er zweeft een engel"	Will Ferdy; F. Coene	Willy Hartman
Jo Leemans	"Kleurensymfonie"	Jef Van den Berg	Anton Peters
Jo Leemans	"Levensdroom"	Jacques Raymond	
Jo Leemans	"Mambo op het strand"	Freddy Bruce; Dave Baker	Jo Deensen
Jo Leemans	"Meer dan eens"	Val Dewaert	
Jo Leemans	"Zo mooi"	Pol Dorlois	
Lieve Olga	"Con amore"	Marius Mario	Huby Hermans
Lieve Olga	"Ik hou van Antwerpen"	Willy Lauwens	
Lieve Olga	"Vierentwintig uren"	Jef Van den Berg	Franz van den Bosch
Lieve Olga	"Zij aan zij"	A. van Steyvoort	Nelly Byl
Lize Marke	"3 x 3 = 9"	Jef Van den Berg	Valeer Van Kerckhoven
Lize Marke	"Alleen maar 'liedjes zingen'"	Armand Beliën	Gust Van Gool
Lize Marke	"Het houten brugje"	Jef Van den Berg	B. Gillaerts
Lize Marke	"Luister naar de wind"	André Poppe	Lia Cliquet
Lize Marke	"Mijn engel"	Jozef Bergers; Val Dewaert	
Lize Marke	"Saksisch porselein"	Pol Dorlois	
Lize Marke	"Troubadour"	Pol Dorlois	
Rina Pia	"Antonio"	Al Van Dam	Louis Baret
Rina Pia	"Dat is hij"	Marcel Denies	Henk van Montfoort
Rina Pia	"Dromen"	Al Van Dam	Ernie Sons
Rina Pia	"Er speelt een orgel"	Al Van Dam	Ernie Sons
Rina Pia	"Het sprookje"	Al Van Dam	Ernie Sons
Rina Pia	"Mijn kleine gouden ster"	Jacques Raymond; Ronny Clarck	
Rina Pia	"'t Was met mimosa"	Al Van Dam	Louis Baret
Rina Pia	"Zeg mij dat mijn hart"	Al Van Dam	Louis Baret
Staf Wesenbeek	"Als jij maar bij me bent"	Ben Maes	Ke Riema
Staf Wesenbeek	"Blij refrein"	Willy Claes	Bert Champagne
Staf Wesenbeek	"Dat klein gebaar"	André Van Steyvoort	Lieve Van Steyvoort
Staf Wesenbeek	"Dromen aan 't kanaal"	Jef Van den Berg	Franz van den Bosch
Staf Wesenbeek	"Heimwee naar jou"	Jacques Raymond; Ronny Clarck	Jacques Raymond
Staf Wesenbeek	"Kom, zeg me eens"	Val. Dewaert	Kestens-Dewaert
Staf Wesenbeek	"Nooit meer"	Ernie Frank; Noel Lambré	
Staf Wesenbeek	"Slechts jij alleen"	Paul Quintens	Phil Van Cauwenbergh
Staf Wesenbeek	"Zonder jou"	Henk van Montfoort; Marcel Denies	Louis Baret
Will Ferdy	"Dag lieve juffrouw lente"	Armand Preud'homme	Lode Verbeeck
Will Ferdy	"'k Had het willen zien"	Hans Flower	Louis Baret
Will Ferdy	"Het straatje"	Henri Cordon	
Will Ferdy	"Kleine jongen"	Paul Bouveroux; B. Gillaerts	
Will Ferdy	"Lente"	Will Ferdy; F. Coene	Louis Verbeeck
Will Ferdy	"Ode aan de zon"	Henk van Montfoort; Marcel Denies	Henk van Montfoort
Will Ferdy	"Toen"	J. Marinto	Ke Riema

==== Shows ====
===== Semi-finals =====
Voting in the semi-finals was done by an applause meter and a 5-member jury panel. The applause meter gave out 1 to 50 points depending on how loud the applause from the audience was, but since it only counted noise, boos were also counted by the applause meter. The 5-member jury panel consisted of Pieter Leemans, Jef Claessen, Frank Engelen, Gaston Nuyts, and Gerd Mertens, who would each give out 1 to 10 points to every song.

Semi-final 1 – 13 October 1962
R/O	Artist	Song	Public	Jury	Total	Place	Result
1	Jo Leemans	"Mambo op het strand"	19	23	42	9	—N/a
2	Staf Wesenbeek	"Dromen aan 't kanaal"	34	39	73	2	Advanced
3	Lieve Olga	"Vierentwintig uren"	16	26	42	9	—N/a
4	Jacques Raymond	"Het beloofde land"	25	23	48	7	—N/a
5	Lize Marke	"Saksisch porselein"	27	45	72	3	Advanced
6	Freddy Sunder	"Dingen waarvan ik veel hou"	15	29	44	8	—N/a
7	Will Ferdy	"Dag lieve juffrouw lente"	21	39	60	5	—N/a
8	Rina Pia	"'t Was met mimosa"	13	26	39	12	—N/a
9	Bob Benny	"Kleine blauwe zwaluw"	50	36	86	1	Advanced
10	Chris Ellis	"Paris"	29	39	68	4	—N/a
11	Jean Walter	"Als je lacht... (ben je veel mooier)"	15	42	57	6	—N/a
12	Enny Denita	"Laat ons dromen"	19	23	42	9	—N/a

Semi-final 2 – 27 October 1962
R/O	Artist	Song	Public	Jury	Total	Place	Result
1	Bob Benny	"Mia bella Marinella"	38	33	71	5	—N/a
2	Enny Denita	"De eerste melodie"	32	25	57	9	—N/a
3	Staf Wesenbeek	"Dromen aan 't kanaal"	32	31	63	8	—N/a
4	Lize Marke	"Het houten brugje"	45	29	74	3	Advanced
5	Jean Walter	"Op mijn schildersatelier"	25	22	47	12	—N/a
6	Rina Pia	"Dat is hij	36	19	55	11	—N/a
7	Jacques Raymond	"Voorbij"	32	32	64	7	—N/a
8	Lize Marke	"Saksisch porselein"	45	41	86	1	Advanced
9	Staf Wesenbeek	"Dat klein gebaar"	31	26	57	9	—N/a
10	Bob Benny	"Kleine blauwe zwaluw"	41	31	72	4	—N/a
11	Jo Leemans	"'k Ben zo gelukkig"	43	26	69	6	—N/a
12	Will Ferdy	"Ode aan de zon"	43	33	76	2	Advanced

Semi-final 3 – 10 November 1962
R/O	Artist	Song	Public	Jury	Total	Place	Result
1	Will Ferdy	"Kleine jongen"	33	25	58	10	—N/a
2	Lize Marke	"Het houten brugje"	45	30	75	4	—N/a
3	Jean Walter	"De gouden wals"	31	29	60	9	—N/a
4	Jo Leemans	"Levensdroom"	41	20	61	8	—N/a
5	Freddy Sunder	"Namanouito"	38	19	57	11	—N/a
6	Lieve Olga	"Ik hou van Antwerpen"	34	18	52	12	—N/a
7	~~Will Ferdy~~	~~"Ode aan de zon"~~	~~50~~	~~30~~	~~80~~	~~3~~	Disqualified
8	Rina Pia	"Er speelt een orgel"	46	38	84	2	Advanced
9	Staf Wesenbeek	"Zonder jou"	50	22	72	6	—N/a
10	Lize Marke	"Saksisch porselein"	50	41	91	1	Qualified
11	Jacques Raymond	"Langs de blauwe wegen"	43	31	74	5	—N/a
12	Chris Ellis	"Toen... werd ik verliefd	50	22	72	6	—N/a

After semi-final 3, "Ode aan de zon" was disqualified as it was released by the composer Henk van Montfoort. Because of this, the 4th places of semi-final 2 and semi-final 3 were added to semi-final 4, causing it to have 14 songs instead of 12.

Semi-final 4 – 24 November 1962
R/O	Artist	Song	Public	Jury	Total	Place	Result
1	Jacques Raymond	"Illusie"	34	30	64	9	—N/a
2	Chris Ellis	"In Shangai"	38	17	55	13	—N/a
3	Staf Wesenbeek	"Nooit meer"	36	19	55	13	—N/a
4	Rina Pia	"Er speelt een orgel"	44	36	80	1	Advanced
5	Bob Benny	"Van hart tot hart"	37	32	69	6	—N/a
6	Lize Marke	"Het houten brugje"	36	30	66	7	—N/a
7	Jacques Raymond	"Het geluk"	42	23	65	8	—N/a
8	~~Bob Benny~~	~~"Kleine blauwe zwaluw"~~	~~47~~	~~32~~	~~79~~	~~2~~	Disqualified
9	Lieve Olga	"Zij aan zij"	44	20	64	9	—N/a
10	Freddy Sunder	"O wist je"	44	26	70	5	—N/a
11	Jo Leemans	"Zo mooi"	41	30	71	4	—N/a
12	Jean Walter	"Hello aardig meisje"	32	25	57	12	—N/a
13	Enny Denita	"Mijn droom is voorbij"	40	35	75	3	Advanced
14	Staf Wesenbeek	"Als jij maar bij me bent"	35	25	60	11	—N/a

After semi-final 4, "Kleine blauwe zwaluw" was disqualified as Bob Benny had published the song. Instead, "Zo mooi" by Jo Leemans qualified for the next semi-final.

Semi-final 5 – 8 December 1962
R/O	Artist	Song	Public	Jury	Total	Place	Result
1	Rina Pia	"Antonio"	35	21	56	9	—N/a
2	Lize Marke	"Alleen maar 'liedjes zingen'"	37	26	63	4	—N/a
3	Jean Walter	"Belinda"	35	24	59	7	—N/a
4	Enny Denita	"Heimwee naar mijn dorpje"	23	21	44	12	—N/a
5	Jo Leemans	"Een lied"	30	28	58	8	—N/a
6	Will Ferdy	"'k Had het willen zien"	25	36	61	5	—N/a
7	Rina Pia	"Er speelt een orgel"	36	39	75	1	Qualified
8	Lieve Olga	"Con amore"	42	24	66	3	Advanced
9	Bob Benny	"Morgen is 't weer vakantietijd"	25	30	55	10	—N/a
10	Chris Ellis	"Geen eigenwijze nozem"	28	27	55	10	—N/a
11	Enny Denita	"Mijn droom is voorbij"	21	39	60	6	—N/a
12	Jo Leemans	"Zo mooi"	37	35	72	2	Advanced

Semi-final 6 – 22 December 1962
R/O	Artist	Song	Public	Jury	Total	Place	Result
1	Jacques Raymond	"Fata morgana"	25	18	43	10	—N/a
2	Chris Ellis	"In de lente van mijn leven"	24	15	39	12	—N/a
3	Stef Wesenbeek	"Blij refrein"	30	21	51	7	—N/a
4	Rina Pia	"Dromen"	34	33	67	1	Advanced
5	Freddy Sunder	"De lente in mijn hart"	26	20	46	9	—N/a
6	Jo Leemans	"Zo mooi"	25	37	62	3	Qualified
7	Jean Walter	"Blauw, blauw"	28	20	48	8	—N/a
8	Enny Denita	"Song festival"	33	23	56	6	—N/a
9	Jacques Raymond	"De oude berkenboom"	26	32	58	5	—N/a
10	Lieve Olga	"Con amore"	42	22	66	2	Advanced
11	Stef Wesenbeek	"Slechts jij alleen"	26	17	43	10	—N/a
12	Lize Marke	"3 x 3 = 9"	37	25	62	3	Advanced

Semi-final 7 – 5 January 1963
R/O	Artist	Song	Public	Jury	Total	Place	Result
1	Rina Pia	"Dromen"	29	34	63	4	—N/a
2	Stef Wesenbeek	"Heimwee naar jou"	23	24	47	9	—N/a
3	Lize Marke	"3 x 3 = 9"	34	27	61	5	—N/a
4	Jacques Raymond	"Waarom?"	34	32	66	2	Advanced
5	Enny Denita	"Leugens"	27	26	53	6	—N/a
6	Jean Walter	"Stof en as"	20	20	40	11	—N/a
7	Lieve Olga	"Con amore"	39	25	64	3	Qualified
8	Jo Leemans	"Er zweeft een engel"	24	27	51	8	—N/a
9	Bob Benny	"Twee harten"	27	25	52	7	—N/a
10	Lize Marke	"Luister naar de wind"	41	39	80	1	Advanced
11	Will Ferdy	"Het straatje"	17	20	37	12	—N/a
12	Rina Pia	"Het sprookje"	23	24	47	9	—N/a

Semi-final 8 – 19 January 1963
R/O	Artist	Song	Public	Jury	Total	Place	Result
1	Jacques Raymond	"Romantiek"	28	21	49	7	—N/a
2	Enny Denita	"Verlangen"	23	26	49	7	—N/a
3	Jean Walter	"Snel gaat de tijd"	18	27	45	10	—N/a
4	Lize Marke	"Mijn engel"	41	21	62	3	Advanced
5	Will Ferdy	"Lente"	28	29	57	5	—N/a
6	Jo Leemans	"Meer dan eens"	29	31	60	4	—N/a
7	Stef Wesenbeek	"Kom, zeg me eens"	24	23	47	9	—N/a
8	Jacques Raymond	"Waarom?"	31	34	65	2	Advanced
9	Lize Marke	"Luister naar de wind"	50	40	90	1	Advanced
10	Bob Benny	"Dans een polka"	34	21	55	6	—N/a
11	Rina Pia	"Mijn kleine gouden ster"	22	22	44	11	—N/a
12	Freddy Sunder	"Ontrouw"	21	18	39	12	—N/a

Semi-final 9 – 2 February 1963
R/O	Artist	Song	Public	Jury	Total	Place	Result
1	Chris Ellis	"Veel mooier"	19	19	38	12	—N/a
2	Jacques Raymond	"Denk steeds aan mij"	29	28	57	5	—N/a
3	Lize Marke	"Mijn engel"	31	22	53	7	—N/a
4	Will Ferdy	"Toen"	38	19	57	5	—N/a
5	Enny Denita	"Wanneer de rozen bloeien"	16	24	40	11	—N/a
6	Jean Walter	"Erna"	25	24	49	8	—N/a
7	Lize Marke	"Troubadour"	31	28	59	4	—N/a
8	Rina Pia	"Zeg mij dat mijn hart"	22	23	45	10	—N/a
9	Jacques Raymond	"Waarom?"	41	35	76	2	Qualified
10	Lize Marke	"Luister naar de wind"	50	39	89	1	Qualified
11	Bob Benny	"Estramadura"	35	27	62	3	—N/a
12	Jo Leemans	"Kleurensymfonie"	16	32	48	9	—N/a

To qualify from the ninth semi-final, songs had to receive at least 73 points, the average number of points that every previous song that qualified to the final got in their last semi-final.

===== Final =====
The final was held on 16 February at the Amerikaans Theater in Brussels, hosted by Denise Maes and Bob Boon. The winner was chosen by two separate juries. The first jury consisted of 20 professionals, while the second jury consisted of 20 people who were mostly winners of De Muziek Kampioen, a Dutch-speaking music quiz show. At the start of the show, the hosts explained that the competition was exclusively to select the song that would represent Belgium in the Eurovision Song Contest 1963, and not the artist. However, Jacques Raymond was selected as the performer of "Waarom?" at the Eurovision Song Contest 1963 anyway. Each song was sung twice by two different artists; songs 1, 2, 3, 4, and 6 were performed by Anita Berry, and song 5 was performed by John De Mol, then every song was performed by the singer who performed it in the semi-finals.

Final – 16 February 1963
R/O	Artist	Song	Jury 1	Jury 2	Total	Place
1	Anita Berry	"Saksisch porselein"	124	123	247	4
1	Lize Marke	"Saksisch porselein"	124	123	247	4
2	Anita Berry	"Er speelt een orgel"	127	147	274	3
2	Rina Pia	"Er speelt een orgel"	127	147	274	3
3	Anita Berry	"Zo mooi"	114	127	241	5
3	Jo Leemans	"Zo mooi"	114	127	241	5
4	Anita Berry	"Con amore"	60	126	186	6
4	Lieve Olga	"Con amore"	60	126	186	6
5	John de Mol	"Waarom?"	114	178	292	1
5	Jacques Raymond	"Waarom?"	114	178	292	1
6	Anita Berry	"Luister naar de wind"	169	120	289	2
6	Lize Marke	"Luister naar de wind"	169	120	289	2

== At Eurovision ==
On the night of the final Raymond performed 14th in the running order, following Sweden and preceding Monaco. Voting was by each national jury awarding 5-4-3-2-1 to their top 5 songs, and at the close of the voting "Waarom?" had received 4 points (all from Austria), placing Belgium 10th of the 16 competing entries. The Belgian jury awarded its 5 points to contest winners Denmark.

The contest was broadcast on BRT (with commentary by the hosts of the national final) and RTB (with commentary by Pierre Delhasse).

=== Voting ===
Points awarded to Belgium
Score	Country
5 points	
4 points	Austria
3 points	
2 points	
1 point	

Points awarded by Belgium
Score	Country
5 points	Denmark
4 points	Switzerland
3 points	Italy
2 points	Austria
1 point	France
