= Jos Brink =

Dutch actor (1942–2007)

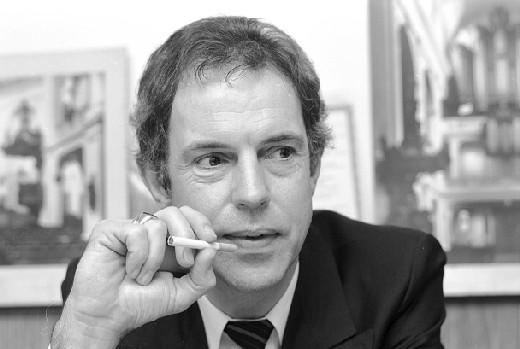
- Born: 19 June 1942; Heiloo, Netherlands
- Died: 17 August 2007 (aged 65); Amsterdam, Netherlands
- Occupations: Comedian, presenter

Jos Brink (19 June 1942 – 17 August 2007) was a Dutch actor, radio and musical performer, film producer, television and radio personality, columnist and author. Brink was also a pastor engaged to the oecumenical congregation De Duif in Amsterdam.

Brink was born in Heiloo, North Holland. He did much to promote acceptance of homosexuality in Dutch society and was a well-known out gay person. He started living with his artistic partner Frank Sanders in 1973.

In a 1979 TV show Thank You, Your Majesty he kissed Queen Juliana (1909–2004) while congratulating her on her 70th birthday.

== Biography ==
Jos Brink was born in Heiloo, North Holland, where his family stayed during the Second World War. After the war, the liberal Remonstrant family with five sons lived successively in Rotterdam and Zuidoostbeemster, where his father worked at the tax authorities in Purmerend. Later, his parents moved to Heerlen. During his youth, Brink was regularly taken by his parents to theater performances in Amsterdam.

=== Education and career ===
During his secondary school years, Brink enrolled at Minjon, the youth training of the AVRO. He made his debut at the radio drama core of the Nederlandse Radio Unie in 1959 with three words in the radio play, De Z-mysterie van de hoorspelkern.

Among other things, he played "Van Bergen" in the radio play Testbemanning. Brink had set his sights on a career as an artist, but his father thought that was a bad idea for financial reasons. He then went on to study acting.

In the sixties, Jos Brink was a presenter at the AVRO radio program Tussen Tien Plus En Twintig Min. He was the presenter of the concert of The Rolling Stones in the Kurhaus, Scheveningen (1964), which was broken off after riots broke out in the audience within fifteen minutes of the start. That same year, he sailed through the canals of Amsterdam with the Beatles.

In the period 1962–1967, the Brink family lived in Tilburg.

Brink has played in many cabaret and musical performances, including Tekstpierement, together with his future husband Frank Sanders. Wobbewoaf (1969) was Brink's first solo show. His real breakthrough came in the seventies, with the musical Maskerade (1979) and his own television show De Jos Brink Show (1986). He lent his voice to numerous radio commercials in the late sixties and early seventies. The presenter went on TV around the world after he spontaneously kissed Queen Juliana in a program celebrating her seventieth birthday.

Brink then made a splash as a panel member of the quiz Babbelonië. He also became known with the television shows Wedden dat..?, De 64.000 Gulden Vraag on RTL 4, and with the television program TV Toppers on the NCRV. "Wedden dat" was also a popular television program in Vlaanderen. In December 2005, he was seen in the musical "Als op het Leidseplein" about the life of lyricist Jacques van Tol. He also played in the musical Sonneveld about the life of the eponymous Wim Sonneveld. In 2005, he also played the role of museum director in the Dutch youth film Sinterklaas en het Geheim van de Robijn by director Martijn van Nellestijn.

From May 2006, he was part of the cabaret company Purper 101. In 2007, Brink would again be part of this cabaret company. In 2006, he would again play in the new Sinterklaas film Sinterklaas en het Uur van de Waarheid, but due to circumstances, this role was taken over by Purper colleague Frans Mulder. Brink remained involved in the behind-the-scenes production. Brink regularly played Sinterklaas on TV and in private circles.

Brink spoke openly about his homosexual orientation and has always strongly advocated for its acceptance. Brink was a buddy for many years at the ecumenical community De Duif in Amsterdam. He regularly wrote contributions for the Gay Krant and developed a play about the disease aids, called A new death. Brink was also active as a pastor-preacher (he derived the authority for this from the Remonstrant Church) and he was associated as a leader at the ecumenical base community De Duif in Amsterdam.

== Awards ==
- Gouden Televizier-Ring for AVRO's Puzzeluur (1979) and for Wedden, dat..? (1986)
- Ridder in de Orde van Oranje-Nassau (1988)
- Eremedaille van Verdienste by the Ministry of Culture in Belgium (1989)
- Frans Banninck Cocq Penning by the Municipality of Amsterdam (2002)

== Death ==
Jos Brink died of colorectal cancer in Amsterdam on 17 August 2007, aged 65.
