= Gay Krant =

Dutch LGBTQ magazine

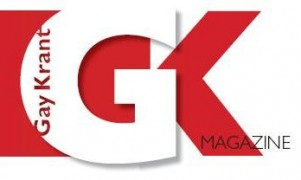
Gaykrant-logo

Gay Krant was a Dutch magazine written for the gay community, published every month since 1980. It was published by the Best Publishing Group under leadership of Henk Krol. The magazine has its headquarters in Amsterdam.

After a bankruptcy in 2013, the magazine was taken over by the companies behind the other gay media Winq, Gay.nl and OUTTV. The Gay Krant then first appeared as a combined edition with homoglossy Winq under the name Winq | Gaykrant, but eventually the indication Gaykrant disappeared and nowadays the magazine is simply called Winq.

Since August 2017, Gaykrant has been re-launched (online only) and is part of the Gaykrant Foundation. The aim is to make all old editions available online.

== Gay Krant Award ==
- 1992 – Jos Brink and Frank Sanders
- 1996 – Jan van Kilsdonk
- 2000 – Paul de Leeuw
- 2004 – Boris Dittrich
- 2006 – Will Ferdy
