= Lily Castel =

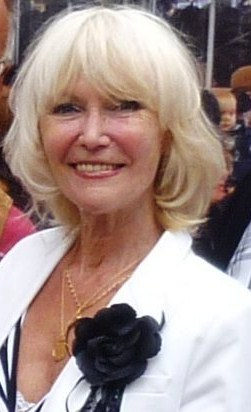

Background information
- Born: Alice van Acker; 10 April 1937 (age 89)
- Origin: Ghent, Belgium
- Genre: Pop
- Occupation: Singer

Lily Castel (born Alice van Acker on 10 April 1937) is a Belgian singer, best known for her participation with Jacques Raymond in the 1971 Eurovision Song Contest.

== Background ==
Castel started out as a dancer before auditioning for television talent show Ontdek de Ster in 1958. She obtained regular work singing with orchestras, and through the 1960s appeared on television and performed internationally, including at the Sopot International Song Festival. In 1970, she toured with former Eurovision singer Lize Marke.

== Career ==
Along with Jacques Raymond, Ann Christy, Nicole Josy and Hugo Deltas, Castel was one of the team members from Belgium that were to represent their country at the 10th European Song Cup Contest to be held at the venue of the Casino, Knokkele-Zoute in Brussels on July 12 -18 1968.

Castel recorded the Barbara Ruskin song "Gentlemen Please" which was released on the Decca label in 1969.

=== Eurovision Song Contest ===
The 1971 selection process for the Belgian Eurovision entry had resulted in a comprehensive victory for the song "Goeiemorgen, morgen" ("Good Morning, Morning"), performed by Nicole & Hugo, to be the representative for the 16th Eurovision Song Contest, to take place on 3 April in Dublin. Less than a week before the contest, however, Nicole fell ill with jaundice and the duo had to withdraw. As last-minute replacements, BRT drafted in Castel and Belgium's 1963 Eurovision veteran Jacques Raymond. It was a race against time for the pair, not least when they arrived in Dublin to find that the stage layout at the Gaiety Theatre was unsuitable for the routine they had rehearsed. In the circumstances they gave a creditable performance on the night, but "Goeiemorgen, morgen" could not win over the juries and finished in joint 14th place in a field of 18.

== Later career ==
Castel remains active, having been a successful performer in concerts and variety shows for many years.

Preceded by Jean Vallée with "Viens l'oublier"	Belgium in the Eurovision Song Contest (with Jacques Raymond); 1971	Succeeded by Serge & Christine Ghisoland with "À la folie ou pas du tout"
