= Belgium in the Eurovision Song Contest 1975 =

- Eurovision Song Contest 1975
- Participating broadcaster: Belgische Radio- en Televisieomroep (BRT)
- Country: Belgium
- Selection process: Eurosong
- Selection date: 1 March 1975

Competing entry
- Song: "Gelukkig zijn"
- Artist: Ann Christy
- Songwriter: Mary Boduin

Placement
- Final result: 15th, 17 points

Participation chronology

Belgium was represented at the Eurovision Song Contest 1975 with the song "Gelukkig zijn", written by Mary Boduin, and performed by Ann Christy. The Belgian participating broadcaster, Flemish Belgische Radio- en Televisieomroep (BRT), selected its entry through a national final. Ann Christy had previously taken part in the 1971 and 1973 national finals. Future Belgian representatives Micha Marah (1979) and Dream Express (1977) also took part in the national final.

== Before Eurovision ==
=== Eurosong ===
Eurosong was the national final format developed by Flemish broadcaster Belgische Radio- en Televisieomroep (BRT) which determined the song that would represent Belgium at the Eurovision Song Contest 1975. This was the first edition of Eurosong, which would become the name of every BRT and VRT national final after 1975 (With the exception of 1996), and would become synonymous with the Eurovision Song Contest itself in Belgium. This was also the first ever national final called Eurosong in the history of Eurovision Song Contest national finals, a name that would be adopted by several other countries for their national finals, such as: Ireland, the Czech Republic, North Macedonia, Bosnia and Herzegovina, and Slovakia.

==== Format ====
The first stage of the selection process consisted of seven semi-finals at the Amerikaans Theater in Brussels, taking part between 17 November 1974 and 16 February 1975, hosted by Staf Van Berendoncks. The format was similar to the former Belgian national final Canzonissima, where each semi-final had ten artists and the top three songs would be reused by their artists in the next semi-final while the other seven artists would select new songs. Songs that got top three in two consecutive semi-finals qualified to the final.

==== Competing entries ====
BRT shortlisted eight singers and two groups for Eurosong 1975: Ann Christy, Rita Deneve, Ingriani, Micha Marah, Ann Michel, Connie Neefs, Luk Bral, Joe Harris, The Lollipops, and Magenta. A rule in Eurosong 1975 allowed artists to also participate with bands, causing Dream Express, Jeremiah, Road, and The Pebbles to participate as well. A total of 58 songs competed in Eurosong 1975.

Competing entries
Artist	Song	Songwriter(s)	
Artist	Song	Composer(s)	Lyricist(s)
Ann Christy	"Als je eenzaam bent"	Ignace Baert	Erik Marijsse
Ann Christy	"Gelukkig zijn"	Mary Boduin	
Ann Christy	"Oh mon amour"	Léonil McCormick	Nelly Bijl
Ann Christy and Dream Express	"Hartenbreker"	Luc Smets	Nelly Bijl
Ann Michel	"Alleen voortaan"	Gerd Frank, G. Van den Ostende	Cahelo
Ann Michel	"Als de lente komt"	Gerd Frank, G. Van den Ostende	Phil Van Cauwenbergh
Ann Michel	"Droomland aan zee"	Rudy Witt	Ernie Frank, Dolphi
Ann Michel	"Je hebt je vergist"	Gerd Frank, G. Van den Ostende	Cahelo
Ann Michel	"Mijn gentleman"	Jacques Raymond	Raymond Resmann
Connie Neefs	"Come On Baby"	Gerd Frank, G. Van Ostende, Ernie Frank	
Connie Neefs	"Fils à papa"	Jacques Raymond	Raymond Resmann
Connie Neefs	"Ik ben funny"	Rudy Witt, Frank Ernie	Dolphi
Connie Neefs	"Leven moet je drinken"	D. Hermes	Huguette De Backer
Connie Neefs	"Mijn droom"	Gerd Frank, G. Van den Ostende, Huguette De Backer	
Connie Neefs	"Ook dat nog"	Luc Smets	Walter Ertveld
Connie Neefs	"Vraag niet waarom"	Paul Quintens	Phil Van Cauwenbergh
Ingriani	"Dan zal ik dansen"	Greta Mestdagh	
Ingriani	"Hey capitano"	Eddy Govert	
Ingriani	"Hey hey dandy"	Greta Mestdagh	
Ingriani	"Lady"	Greta Mestdagh, Rick Vervecken	
Ingriani	"Zo zacht"	Eddy Govert	
Joe Harris	"De wereld"	Joe Harris, Van Winkele, Pavic	
Joe Harris	"De wereld zingt een nieuw refrein"	J. Paul, J. R. Van Herck	
Joe Harris	"Hou je van mij"	J. Leopold, Roos Windels	
Joe Harris	"Sla je handen in elkaar"	Eddy Govert	
Joe Harris	"Zo was er niemand"	J. Van Hoeck, Roos Windels	
Joe Harris and Jeremiah	"Het is zo goed weer thuis te zijn"	Joe Harris, Van Winkele, Pavic	
Luk Bral	"Alleen"	Dirk Devriendt	Luk Bral
Luk Bral	"Alles wat ik heb"	Willy van Couwenberghe	Luk Bral
Luk Bral	"Een zonnige zondagmiddag"	Dirk Devriendt	Luk Bral
Luk Bral	"Laat een jongenshart nooit alleen"	Romain Schoonis	Luk Bral
Luk Bral	"Kom geef mij je kleine hand"	Luk Bral	
Luk Bral	"Morgen zal alles beter gaan"	Luk Bral	
Luk Bral and Road	"Ik wil terug naar mijn moeder"	Willy van Couwenberghe	Luk Bral
Magenta	"Alleen je lichaam"	Roland Arnould, Wim Reiling	Roland Arnould
Magenta	"De dikke encyclopedie"	Roland Arnould, Wim Reiling	Roland Arnould
Magenta	"Een kind van nog geen zeven"	Roland Arnould, Wim Reiling	Roland Arnould
Magenta	"Het land van friet en pils"	A. Arnould, Wim Reiling	
Magenta	"Mens wat wil je meer"	Roland Arnould, Wim Reiling	Roland Arnould
Magenta	"Wat over Frits en zin familie wordt verteld"	Roland Arnould, Wim Reiling	Roland Arnould
Magenta	"Zonder geld, zonder vrouw, zonder baan"	Roland Arnould, Wim Reiling	Roland Arnould
Micha Marah	"Ik weet"	Willy Van Couwenberghe	Albert Lepage
Micha Marah	"Kom bij mij"	Willy Van Couwenberghe	Albert Lepage
Micha Marah	"Weet je waarom"	Willy Van Couwenberghe	Albert Lepage
Micha Marah	"Zeven uur is liefde"	Willy Van Couwenberghe	Albert Lepage
Micha Marah and the Pebbles	"'t Is over"	Fred Bekky, Bob Baelemans	
Rita Deneve	"Ben je vergeten dat ik van je hou"	J. G. Callebaut	Yan Nick
Rita Deneve	"Ciao adieu, auf wiedersehen"	J. G. Callebaut	Yan Nick
Rita Deneve	"Dance Dance Mama"	J. G. Callebaut, P. Montouris	Mary Boduin
Rita Deneve	~~"Maar toch blijf je de eerste"~~	Unknown	
Rita Deneve	"Niemand, is er dan niemand"	Sylvain Van Holmen	Yan Nick
Rita Deneve	"Vogelvrij"	Sylvain Van Holmen	Penny Els
The Lollipops	"Hello Everyone, Everywhere in the World"	Bobby Ranger	
The Lollipops	"Kansas City Joe"	C. Van Mere, José Fontaine	
The Lollipops	"Love, Love, Love"	Johan Stollz, Rick Vervecken	E. Debacker
The Lollipops	"My Love, Oh My Love"	Ignace Baert	Erik Marijsse
The Lollipops	"Shalala"	Willy van Couwenberghe	Van Mere
The Lollipops	"Valentijn"	Paul Quintens	Phil van Cauwenbergh
The Lollipops	"'t Was een mooie tijd"	C. Van Mere, José Fontaine, Rick Vervecken	

==== Shows ====
===== Semi-finals =====
Voting in the semi-finals was done by five provincial juries, each consisting of ten members of the public, five men and five women. After every show, all fifty were replaced. Since songs introduced in semi-final 9 could not get top three in two semi-finals and qualify to the final, the rules to qualify for the final were changed for semi-final 9. Songs had to receive at least 377 points, the average number of points that every song that qualified to the final got in their last semi-final.

The first four semi-finals were recorded on a Saturday and broadcast on the Sunday. The fifth semi-final was never recorded and broadcast due to a strike at BRT, but it still took place behind closed doors. The sixth and seventh semi-finals were broadcast live on a Saturday.

Semi-final 1 – 17 November 1974
R/O	Artist	Song	Points	Place	Result
1	Micha Marah	"Kom bij mij"	365	3	Advanced
2	Ingriani	"Hey capitano"	336	4	—N/a
3	Magenta	"Het land van friet en pils"	250	8	—N/a
4	The Lollipops	"Shalala"	219	9	—N/a
5	Connie Neefs	"Ik ben funny"	331	5	—N/a
6	Joe Harris	"De wereld zingt een nieuw refrein"	275	7	—N/a
7	Luk Bral	"Kom geef mij je kleine hand"	286	6	—N/a
8	Rita Deneve	"Ben je vergeten dat ik van je hou"	377	1	Advanced
9	Ann Michel	"Mijn gentleman"	340	2	Advanced

Ann Christy was absent from semi-final 1 as she was abroad at the time.

Semi-final 2 – 1 December 1974
R/O	Artist	Song	Points	Place	Result
1	Ann Michel	"Mijn gentleman"	401	1	Qualified
2	Micha Marah	"Kom bij mij"	383	2	Qualified
3	Ingriani	"Zo zacht"	316	6	—N/a
4	Magenta	"Alleen je lichaam"	189	9	—N/a
5	The Lollipops	"Kansas City Joe"	142	10	—N/a
6	Connie Neefs	"Ook dat nog"	231	7	—N/a
7	Ann Christy	"Als je eenzaam bent"	376	3	Advanced
8	Joe Harris	"Sla je handen in elkaar"	321	5	—N/a
9	Luk Bral	"Alleen"	226	8	—N/a
10	Rita Deneve	"Ben je vergeten dat ik van je hou"	372	4	—N/a

Semi-final 3 – 15 December 1974
R/O	Artist	Song	Points	Place	Result
1	Ann Michel	"Alleen voortaan"	360	3	Advanced
2	Micha Marah	"Weet je waarom"	360	3	Advanced
3	Ingriani	"Dan zal ik dansen"	380	2	Advanced
4	Magenta	"De dikke encyclopedie"	192	8	—N/a
5	The Lollipops	"Hello Everyone, Everywhere in the World"	350	5	—N/a
6	Connie Neefs	"Mijn droom"	323	6	—N/a
7	Ann Christy	"Als je eenzaam bent"	413	1	Qualified
8	Joe Harris	"Hou je van mij"	311	7	—N/a
9	Luk Bral	"Een zonnige zondagmiddag"	156	9	—N/a

Rita Deneve would have participated with the song "Maar toch blijf je de eerste" but was absent due to the birth of her son.

Semi-final 4 – 29 December 1974
R/O	Artist	Song	Points	Place	Result
1	Luk Bral	"Alles wat ik heb"	269	9	—N/a
2	Rita Deneve	"Vogelvrij"	314	6	—N/a
3	Ann Michel	"Alleen voortaan"	359	3	Qualified
4	Micha Marah	"Weet je waarom"	356	4	—N/a
5	Ingriani	"Dan zal ik dansen"	375	1	Qualified
6	Magenta	"Zonder geld, zonder vrouw, zonder baan"	186	10	—N/a
7	The Lollipops	"Valentijn"	296	8	—N/a
8	Connie Neefs	"Come On Baby"	318	5	—N/a
9	Ann Christy	"Gelukkig zijn"	372	2	Advanced
10	Joe Harris	"Zo was er niemand"	305	7	—N/a

Semi-final 5 – 18 January 1975
R/O	Artist	Song	Points	Place	Result
1	Joe Harris and Jeremiah	"Het is zo goed weer thuis te zijn"	387	3	Advanced
2	Luk Bral	"Morgen zal alles beter gaan"	279	7	—N/a
3	Rita Deneve	"Niemand, is er dan niemand"	337	4	—N/a
4	Ann Michel	"Je hebt je vergist"	321	6	—N/a
5	Micha Marah	"Zeven uur is liefde"	325	5	—N/a
6	Ingriani	"Hey hey dandy"	402	2	Advanced
7	Magenta	"Mens wat wil je meer"	262	9	—N/a
8	The Lollipops	"My Love, Oh My Love"	220	10	—N/a
9	Connie Neefs	"Leven moet je drinken"	267	8	—N/a
10	Ann Christy	"Gelukkig zijn"	423	1	Qualified

The fifth semi-final was not broadcast due to a strike at BRT, but it still took place.

Semi-final 6 – 1 February 1975
R/O	Artist	Song	Points	Place	Result
1	Ann Christy and Dream Express	"Hartenbreker"	319	4	—N/a
2	Joe Harris and Jeremiah	"Het is zo goed weer thuis te zijn"	325	3	Qualified
3	Luk Bral	"Laat een jongenshart nooit alleen"	233	9	—N/a
4	Rita Deneve	"Ciao adieu, aufwiedersehn"	317	5	—N/a
5	Ann Michel	"Droomland aan zee"	272	7	—N/a
6	~~Micha Marah~~	~~"Ik weet"~~	~~381~~	~~1~~	Disqualified
7	Ingriani	"Hey hey dandy"	378	2	Qualified
8	Magenta	"Een kind van nog geen zeven"	192	10	—N/a
9	The Lollipops	"Love, Love, Love"	281	6	—N/a
10	Connie Neefs	"Fils à papa"	262	8	—N/a

After Semi-final 6, Micha Marah withdrew "Ik weet" as she wanted to participate with a different song in semi-final 7.

Semi-final 7 – 15 February 1975
R/O	Artist	Song	Points	Place	Result
1	Connie Neefs	"Vraag niet waarom"	329	5	—N/a
2	Ann Christy	"Oh mon amour"	351	3	—N/a
3	Joe Harris	"De wereld"	341	4	—N/a
4	Luk Bral and Road	"Ik wil terug naar mijn moeder"	209	10	—N/a
5	Rita Deneve	"Dance Dance Mama"	394	1	Qualified
6	Ann Michel	"Als de lente komt"	286	7	—N/a
7	Micha Marah and the Pebbles	"'t Is over"	384	2	Qualified
8	Ingriani	"Lady"	329	5	—N/a
9	Magenta	"Wat over Frits en zin familie wordt verteld"	242	8	—N/a
10	The Lollipops	"'t Was een mooie tijd"	235	9	—N/a

===== Final =====
The final, consisting of ten songs, took place on 1 March 1975 also at the Amerikaans Theater, hosted by Staf Van Berendoncks. Six singers were involved, with four (including Christy) performing two songs apiece. Voting was by five regional juries, each consisting of 20 members of the public, and "Gelukkig zijn" emerged the winner by a margin of almost 60 points.

Final – 1 March 1975
R/O	Artist	Song	Points	Place
1	Ann Christy	"Als je eenzaam bent"	765	3
2	Ann Michel	"Mijn gentleman"	598	10
3	Joe Harris and Jeremiah	"Het is zo goed weer thuis te zijn"	600	9
4	Ingriani	"Dan zal ik dansen"	744	4
5	Micha Marah	"Kom bij mij"	695	7
6	Rita Deneve	"Dance Dance Mama"	727	6
7	Ann Michel	"Alleen voortaan"	626	8
8	Ingriani	"Hey hey dandy"	767	2
9	Ann Christy	"Gelukkig zijn"	825	1
10	Micha Marah and the Pebbles	"'t Is over"	735	5

Detailed Regional Jury Results
R/O	Song	Brabant	East Flanders	Limburg	West Flanders	Antwerp	Total
1	"Als je eenzaam bent"	160	156	150	150	149	765
2	"Mijn gentleman"	112	115	120	122	129	598
3	"Het is zo goed weer thuis te zijn"	103	110	139	123	125	600
4	"Dan zal ik dansen"	138	147	148	175	136	744
5	"Kom bij mij"	148	126	149	127	145	695
6	"Dans dans mama"	128	146	168	137	148	727
7	"Alleen voortaan"	124	116	129	117	140	626
8	"Hey hey dandy"	138	159	150	160	160	767
9	"Gelukkig zijn"	195	156	164	154	156	825
10	"'t Is over"	175	123	166	144	127	735

== At Eurovision ==
On the night of the final Christy performed 11th in the running order, following Israel and preceding Malta. Under the free-language rule in operation at the time, Christy performed the first half of the song in Dutch, before switching to English. At the close of the voting "Gelukkig zijn" had received 17 points, placing Belgium 15th of the 19 participating countries.

=== Voting ===
Points awarded to Belgium
Score	Country
12 points	
10 points	
8 points	
7 points	Germany
6 points	
5 points	Netherlands
4 points	
3 points	Yugoslavia
2 points	Sweden
1 point	

Points awarded by Belgium
Score	Country
12 points	Ireland
10 points	United Kingdom
8 points	Switzerland
7 points	Malta
6 points	Italy
5 points	Yugoslavia
4 points	Spain
3 points	Netherlands
2 points	France
1 point	Israel
