= Ann Christy (singer) =

Belgian singer (1945–1984)

Background information
- Born: Christiane Leenaerts; 22 September 1945
- Origin: Antwerp, Belgium
- Died: 7 August 1984 (aged 38) Jette
- Genre: Pop
- Occupation: Singer

Ann Christy (born Christianne Leenaerts, 22 September 1945 – 7 August 1984) was a Belgian singer who is best known internationally for her participation in the Eurovision Song Contest 1975.

== Early career ==
Christy began a singing career with The Adams Orchestra, whose drummer, Marc Hoyois, she later married. Her first solo recordings were met with little success. During this period, she toured in Belgium and France with Salvatore Adamo. In 1968, she won the Knokke Cup singing contest.

== Eurovision Song Contest ==
Christy's first attempt to represent Belgium in the Eurovision Song Contest came in 1970 with the song "Le temps, le vent" ("Time, Wind"), which failed to progress past the semi-final stage. She did better the following year, when "Dag vreemde man" ("Hello Stranger") finished in second place. A third attempt in 1973, when each of five chosen acts performed two songs, ended in third place for "Bye Bye". (Christy's other song, "Meeuwen" ("Seagulls"), was unplaced).

Christy was successful in 1975, when "Gelukkig zijn" ("Being Happy") was chosen as Belgium's representative in the twentieth Eurovision Song Contest, which took place on 22 March in Stockholm. The song ended the evening in 15th place out of 19 entries.

== Later career ==
In 1977 Christy played in 152 performances of a musical adaptation of Shakespeare's A Midsummer Night's Dream in the town of Mechelen.

She had a major hit in Belgium in 1980 with "De Roos", a Dutch-language version of Bette Midler's "The Rose". In 2008, this track topped a list of 1,000 classics voted for by the general public in a poll for Belgian radio channel, Radio 2.

Compilations of Christy's work have been issued regularly in Belgium since her death, and recently these have included previously unreleased recordings.

== Death ==
Christy was diagnosed with cervical cancer in 1982, and died on 7 August 1984, aged 38.

Preceded by Jacques Hustin with "Fleur de liberté"	Belgium in the Eurovision Song Contest; 1975	Succeeded by Pierre Rapsat with "Judy et Cie"
