= Robert Cogoi =

Belgian singer (1939–2022)

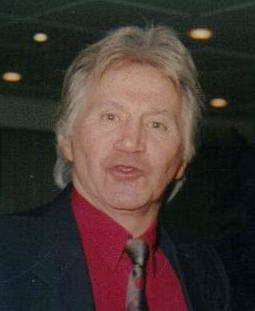
- Cogoi in 2004

Background information
- Birth name: Mirko Kogoj
- Born: 25 October 1939; Châtelet, Belgium
- Died: 14 May 2022 (aged 82)
- Genres: Pop, Chanson
- Occupation: Singer

Robert Cogoi (born Mirko Kogoj, 25 October 1939 – 14 May 2022) was a Belgian singer, best known for his participation in the 1964 Eurovision Song Contest.

== Early career ==
Cogoi was born in Châtelet to Slovene parents. In 1961 he picked up a contract with Philips Records, and the following year, won first prize at the Grand Prix International des Variétés at the Casino in Ostend with the song "Si un jour", which went on to sell 100,000 copies in France, earning Cogoi a gold disc.

== Eurovision Song Contest ==
In 1964, Cogoi was chosen as the Belgian representative to perform his self-penned song "Près de ma rivière" ("Close by My River") in the ninth Eurovision Song Contest, which took place on 21 March in Copenhagen. For the first time since the inaugural contest in 1956, the Belgian entry was chosen by internal selection on the part of TV channel RTBF rather than by a public or jury vote. "Près de ma rivière" received only two votes (from Monaco and Portugal), which was enough for a joint tenth-place finish of 16 entries, as four other songs received no votes at all.

== Later career ==
Cogoi continued releasing albums and singles, with modest success, until the late 1960s. In 1976 he appeared in the Belgium film Les arpents dorés.

After many years out of the public eye, Cogoi made a guest appearance, along with several other former Eurovision participants, at the Belgian Eurovision national final in 2005.

== Discography ==
=== Singles ===
- Si un jour (1962)
- Pardonnez-moi Seigneur (1962)
- Je m'sens très seul (1963)
- Tu mens, mon amour (1963)
- Je fais serment (1963)
- Dou, dou, dou, doux (1963)
- Quand le soleil dit bonjour aux montagnes (1964)
- Près de ma rivière (1964, außerhalb Kanadas nur als EP veröffentlicht)
- Quand le jour se lève (1964, nur in Kanada)
- Quand (1964, nur in Kanada)
- Pas une place pour me garer (1966)
- J'avais besoin de parler à quelqu'un (1966)
- La télé (1966)
- Pas une place pour me garer (1966, nur in Kanada)
- Pour le meilleur et pour le pire (1967)
- Je te demande pardon (1967)
- L'église (1967, nur in Kanada)
- El bandido (1967, nur in Kanada)
- Gina (1968)
- Mon île aux cocotiers (1968)
- Au four et au moulin (1969)
- Ma richesse (1969)
- "La Station Service"/"Le Monde Est Grand " ("Hej Gamle Man") (1971)
- "Oublie Barbara" (1971)

=== EP`s ===
- Si un jour (1962)
- Je m'sens très seul (1963)
- Je serais mieux chez moi (1963)
- Dou, dou, dou, doux (1963)
- Près de ma rivière (1964)
- Non, rien n'a changé (1964)
- Quand le soleil dit bonjour aux montagnes (1964)
- Attendez, attendez (1965)
- Ça se voit sur ton visage (1965)
- 8h, 11h10’, 15h23’ (1966)
- J'avais besoin de parler à quelqu'un (1966)
- La télé (1966)
- Monica (1967)
- Je te demande pardon (1967)

=== Albums ===
- Je serais mieux chez moi... (1963)
- Personne... (1964)
- Les grands succès de Robert Cogoi (1964)
- Je m'sens très seul (1964)
- Robert Cogoi (1967)

Preceded by Jacques Raymond with "Waarom?"	Belgium in the Eurovision Song Contest; 1964	Succeeded by Lize Marke with "Als het weer lente is"
