= De Duif =

Church in Amsterdam, Netherlands

Coordinates: 52.3613°N 4.8968°E

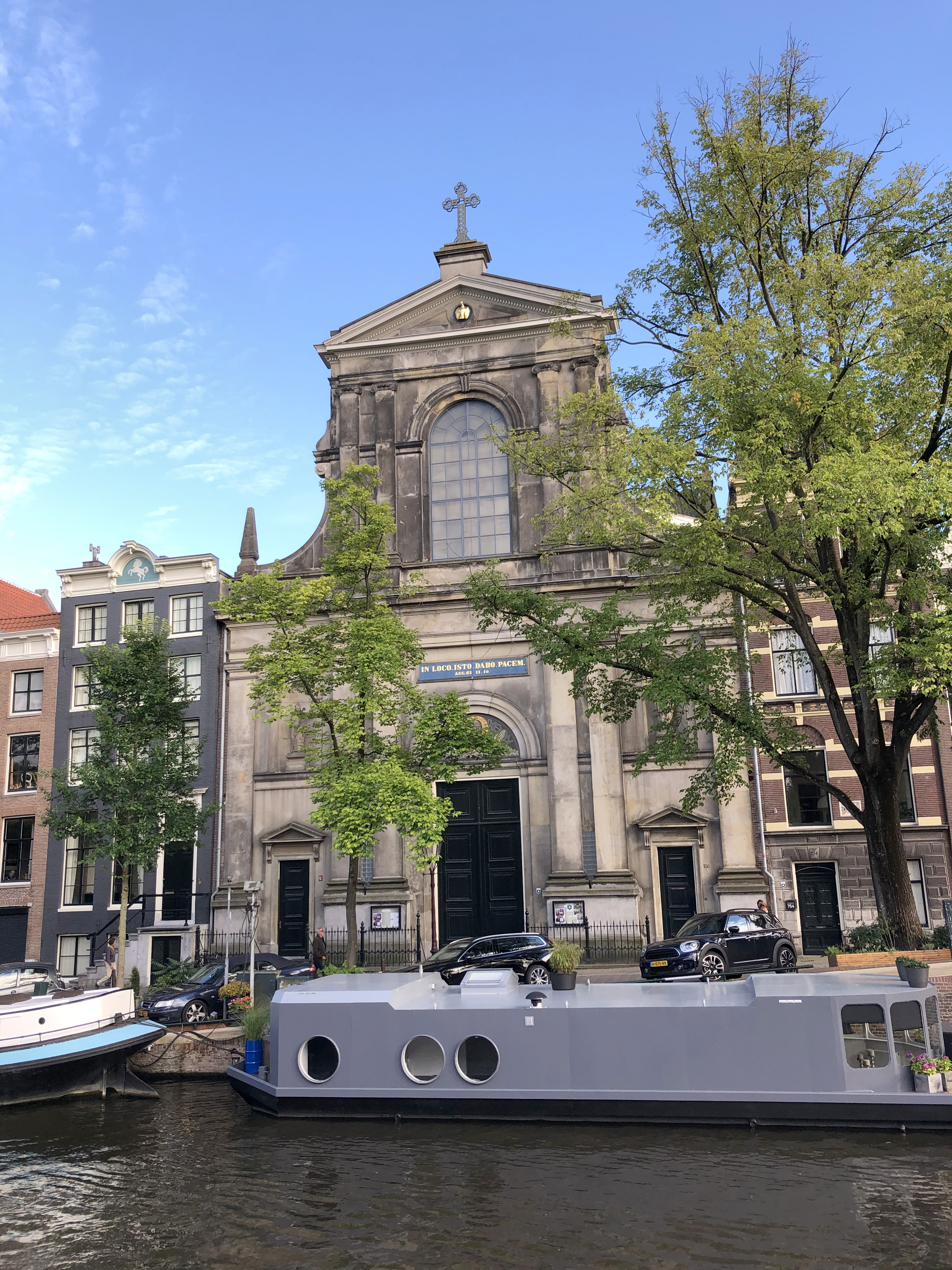
De Duif, a church building in Amsterdam

De Duif is a church on the Prinsengracht in Amsterdam. At present – after the recent restoration by Stadsherstel Amsterdam – it is rented out for all kinds of events.

== History ==
The church was built in 1858 as the Roman Catholic St. Willibrorduskerk designed by the architect Theo Molkenboer. It was a modern replacement for the old St. Willibrordus church which had become too small. That had been the first Catholic church to be built in the Netherlands that was not a hidden church and which had been built on the former location of a sugar factory called "Het Fortuyn", which had burnt down at the close of the 18th century. The original St. Willibrorduskerk was itself a replacement for the century-old hidden church called "Het Vrededuifje" which had stood on the "Kerkstraat".

De Duif is built in the neo classicist style and has a Neo-baroque front. From the opposite site of the canal one has a good view off this building. It is a rijksmonument and inside there is a large Smits-orgel, which is a rijksmonument because it was built by Franciscus Cornelius Smits and his son. This organ was the largest built north of the big Dutch rivers and was taken into service on 25 September 2006, after a restoration. Since 1974 the church is the seat of the "Oecumenische Basisgemeente De Duif" which has its Sunday meetings here.

== Events ==
The building is high and wide and can house events with hundreds of visitors. The acoustics make it suitable for concerts of choirs, orchestras, singers, etc. In fact it is used for things like dance performances, product presentations, television production, theater, shows and business meeting events. In Amsterdam "De Duif" is popular as location for marriage and funerals. It hosts yearly events like the Tangomagia and the Tribal Art Fair. In the summer of 2006 it was one of the locations of the Holland Festival. The building is managed by Stadsherstel.

== Pigeon racing ==
De Duif (the pigeon) is also the name of the oldest and largest pigeon racing magazine of Belgium, founded in 1888.
