= Jo Leemans =

Belgian singer

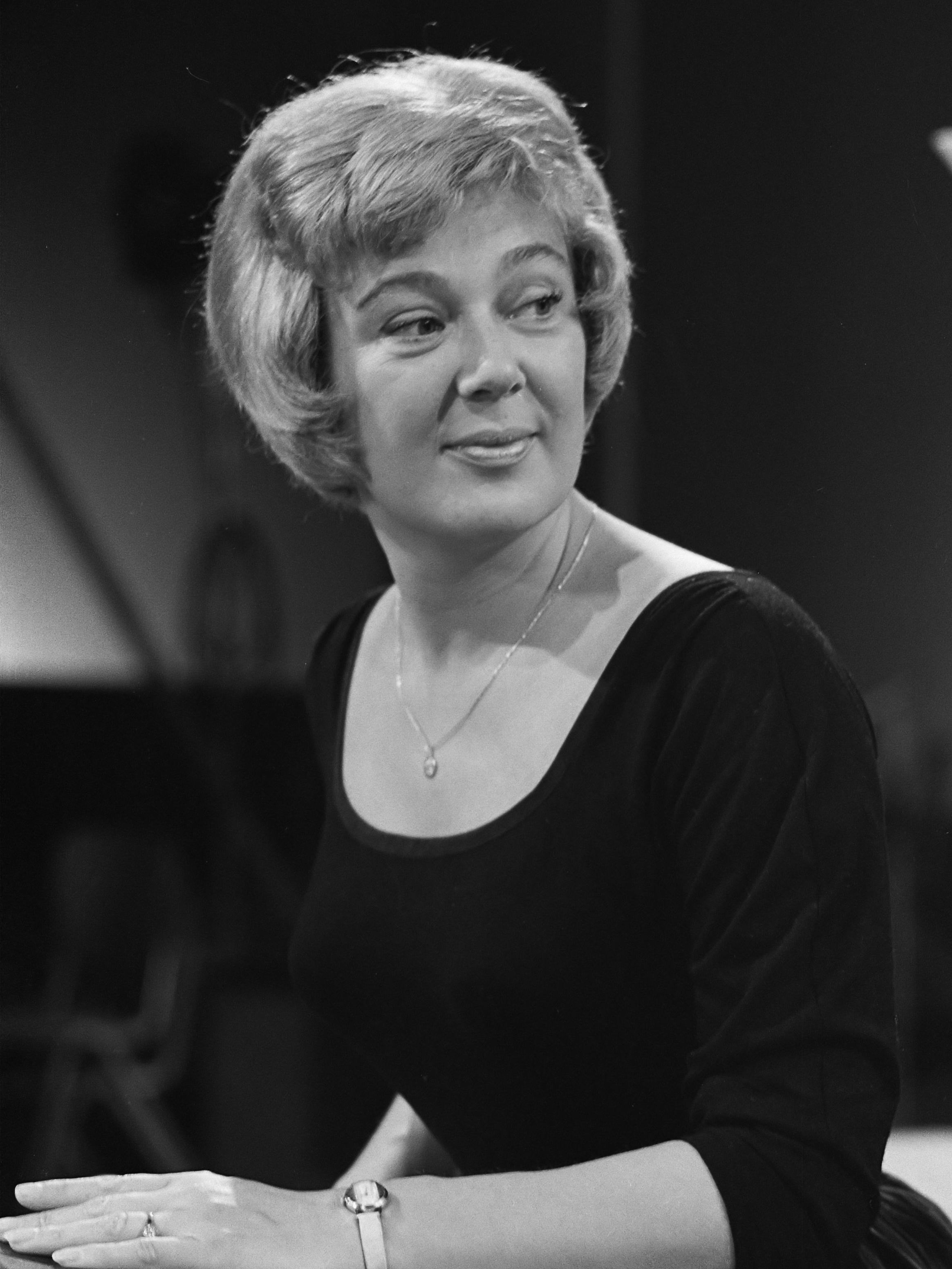
- Jo Leemans (1963)
- Born: Josephine Leemans-Verbustel; 13 August 1927 (age 98); Mechelen, Belgium
- Occupations: broadcast presenter, singer

Josephine Leemans-Verbustel (born 13 August 1927 in Mechelen, Belgium), better known as Jo Leemans, is a Belgian singer who was given the nickname "The Flemish Doris Day" in the 1950s.

She had multiple number 1 hits in the national hit parade including "Que Sera Sera", a Dutch cover of the song by Doris Day, only one month after the original.

Asides from being a singer, she also had a career as a TV and radio host.

== Sources ==
- (in Dutch) Jo Leemans at the Belgian pop and rock archive
- (in Dutch) Dutch Wikipedia page on Jo Leemans
