= Tangomagia =

Tango-event in Amsterdam

Tangomagia was an annual international Tango-event in Amsterdam, occurring between Christmas and New Year's Eve, from 27 to 30 December.

== Program ==
The festival had workshops, the tango-café and the milongas. There was a possibility to follow workshops from the Argentinian maestros. Every afternoon from 16:00 till 20:00 hours there was a tango-café where people can dance on the music of a DJ. In the evenings from 22 - 1 or 3 o'clock there were milongas with performances of the maestros, with live-music most of the time. The music style was traditional tango; no fusion or neo-tango. Every-day there was an "after party" from 3 - 7 so that the visitors had the opportunity to return home by train. The entrance was limited to a few hundred visitors. Most of them came to dance, only a few are just watching.

In 2013, in cooperation with the Muziekgebouw aan 't IJ, there was one evening where non-dancers could visit the festival. During the concert of Sexteto Silencio, there was an opportunity to enjoy the music. The concert was promoted by the Muziekgebouw.

== Locations ==
In 2005 they used "Crea" for the workshops, "Muziekgebouw aan het IJ", "De Duif" (a church) and "Hotel Arena" for the milongas. In previous years they also used the Beurs van Berlage and "Meervaart".

In 2013, the festival started in "De Kompaszaal" and had a main evening in "Het Muziekgebouw aan het IJ". The heart of the festival was "Dansmakers aan het IJ" in the former Kromhout plant. The final evening was in "De Duif".

== History ==
In 1997 was the first Tangomagia festival. Due to the great financial losses of the organizing foundation in 2011 and 2012 (Stichting Zandunga) a bankruptcy was declared on June 3, 2014. Thanks to financial rescue management, the 2013 edition was the last edition. After this, in 2015 the Dutch International Tangoweek foundation was founded to create a non-profit and independent organisation to promote the Argentine Tango in The Netherlands.
