= Will Ferdy =

Belgian singer (1927–2022)

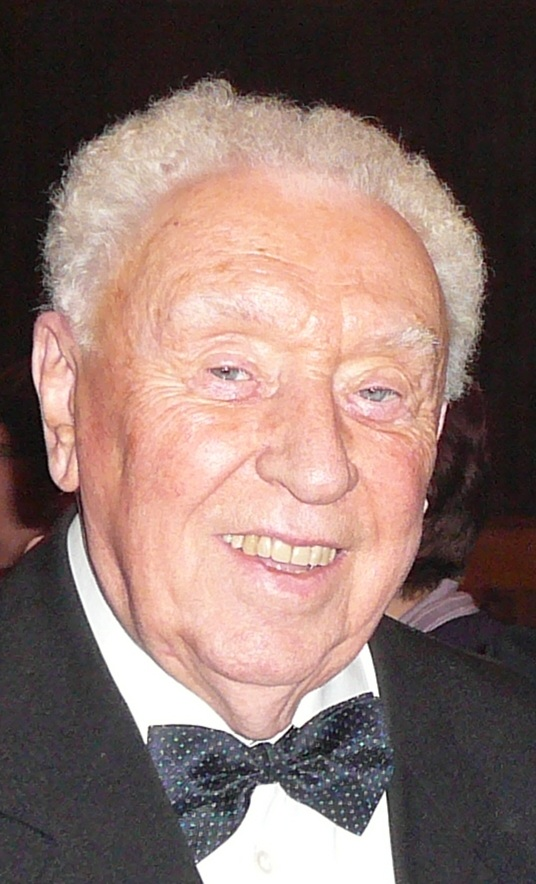
- Ferdy in 2013
- Born: Werner Ferdinande; 9 March 1927; Ghent, Belgium
- Died: 8 November 2022 (aged 95); Antwerp, Belgium
- Occupation: Singer

Werner Ferdinande (9 March 1927 – 8 November 2022), known as Will Ferdy, was a Belgian singer. He became known for the songs Christine, Belijdenis, De stervende, Ziede gij me gere, and Het Schrijverke, which is a song, based on the poem Het Schrijverke with the same name, by Guido Gezelle. He was a figurehead within the gay community, because he was the first Flemish singer to come out. He received the Gay Krant award in 2006. Earlier in his career, Ferdy was also active as a comedian.

Ferdy suffered from Parkinson's disease. He died in Antwerp on 8 November 2022, at the age of 95.
