= Jacques Raymond =

Belgian singer (born 1938)

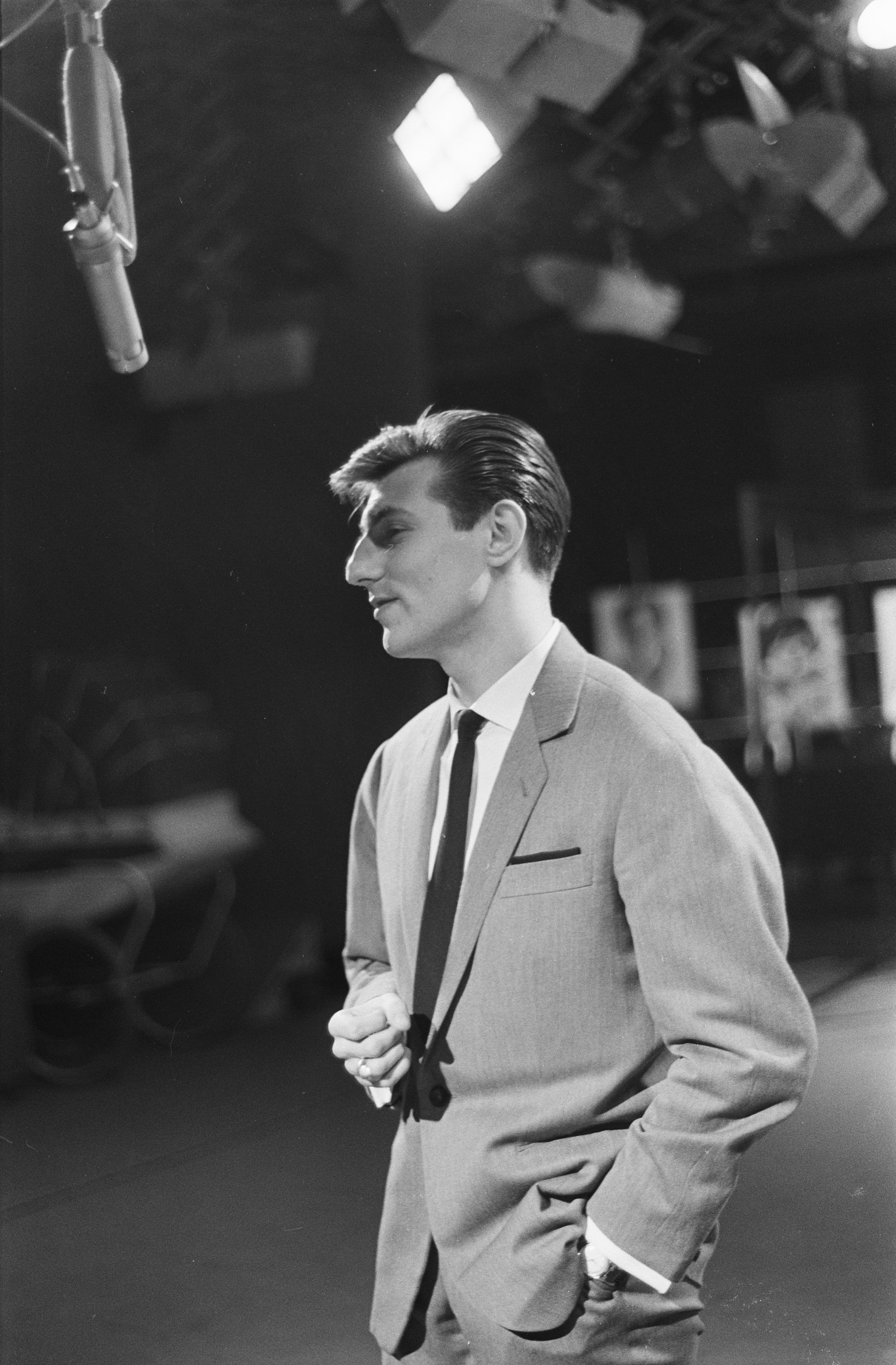
- Raymond (1963)

Background information
- Born: Jozef Remon; 13 October 1938 (age 87)
- Origin: Temse, Belgium
- Genres: Pop, schlager
- Occupation: Singer

Jacques Raymond (born Jozef Remon on 13 October 1938) is a Belgian singer.

He represented Belgium in the Eurovision Song Contest 1963 with the Dutch song "Waarom?". In the Eurovision Song Contest 1971, he teamed up with Lily Castel to sing "Goeiemorgen, Morgen" for the Belgian entry on short notice after Nicole Josy of Nicole & Hugo fell ill.

== Discography ==
- Goeiemorgen, morgen
- Heel veel liefs en tot ziens
- Ik blijf op je wachten
- Klappen in de handen
- Jouw good-bye
- Onder 't groen van de bomen
- You're so simpatico
- Slotakkoord
- Permettete, signorina
- Tannia

== Singles ==
- Waarom (1963)
- Die dolle Dolly (1964)
- Keine Freunde (1968)
- Nooit was ik zo verliefd
- Nina
- Sylvie

== See also ==
- Belgium in the Eurovision Song Contest

Preceded by Fud Leclerc with "Ton nom"	Belgium in the Eurovision Song Contest; 1963	Succeeded by Robert Cogoi with "Près de ma rivière"
Preceded by Jean Vallée with "Viens l'oublier"	Belgium in the Eurovision Song Contest (with Lily Castel); 1971	Succeeded by Serge & Christine Ghisoland with "À la folie ou pas du tout"
