= Lize Marke =

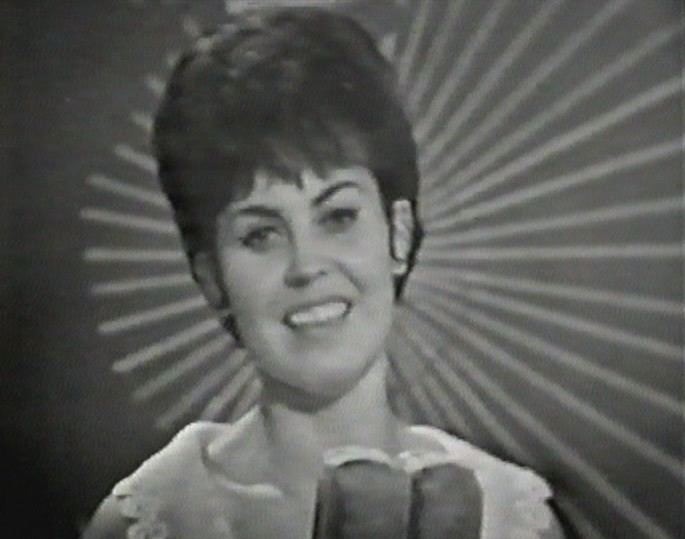
- Lize Marke at Eurovision

Background information
- Birth name: Liliane Couck
- Born: 1 December 1936 (age 88)
- Origin: Denderleeuw, Belgium
- Genres: Pop
- Occupation: Singer

Lize Marke (born Liliane Couck, Denderleeuw, 1 December 1936) is a Belgian singer, best known for her participation in the 1965 Eurovision Song Contest.

== Eurovision Song Contest ==
Marke started singing professionally in 1962, and first participated in the Belgian Eurovision selection in 1963, when she performed two songs, "Luister naar de wind" and "Saksisch porselein", which made the final, finishing in second and fourth respectively.

Marke sung all six songs in the 1965 Eurovision selection, and "Als het weer lente is" ("When It's Spring Again") was chosen by jury vote as the Belgian representative in the tenth Eurovision Song Contest, held on 20 March in Naples, Italy. "Als het weer lente is" failed to score, finishing in joint last place (with Finland, Germany and Spain) of the 18 entrants. It was Belgium's second "nul pointer", following Fud Leclerc's zero in 1962. Marke was the first female singer to represent Belgium at Eurovision since Mony Marc in the inaugural contest of 1956.

== Later career ==
In 1965, Marke fronted her own television show on Belgian channel VRT. Thereafter her career went quieter, although she continued to release records and perform live until the mid-1970s. A compilation CD of her recordings was issued in 2002.

== Discography ==
Singles

- 1963 "Luister naar de wind"
- 1964 "Esta noch no"
- 1965 "Als het weer lente is"
- 1967 "Kerstnacht"
- 1967 "Lara's Lied"
- 1967 "Wat is 't leven toch mooi"
- 1970 "Zeemeeuw"
- 1974 "Papillon"
- 1975 "Vlaanderen mijn vaderland"

=== Alben ===
- "Aandacht voor"
- "Mijn lied(eren) voor jou"

Preceded by Robert Cogoi with "Près de ma rivière"	Belgium in the Eurovision Song Contest; 1965	Succeeded by Tonia with "Un peu de poivre, un peu de sel"
