= History of the Eurovision Song Contest =

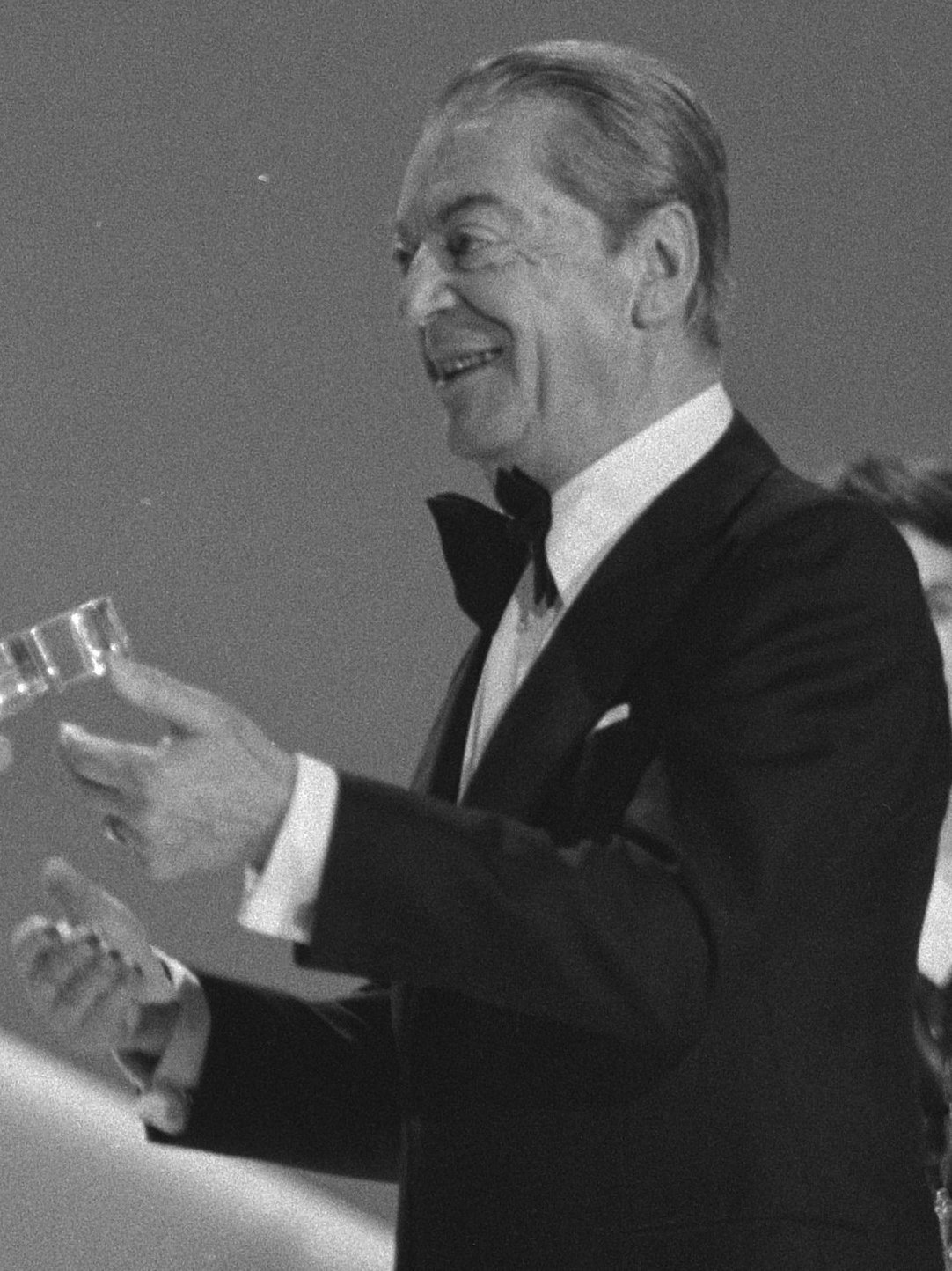
Marcel Bezençon (1907–1981) was one of the key figures involved in creating the Eurovision Song Contest.

The Eurovision Song Contest (French: Concours Eurovision de la chanson) was first held in 1956. Following a series of exchange broadcasts in 1954 through its Eurovision transmission network, the European Broadcasting Union (EBU) commissioned an international song competition, from an idea proposed by Sergio Pugliese and developed by Marcel Bezençon, and originally based on the Sanremo Music Festival in Italy.

70 contests have been held since its first edition, and 1,789 songs representing 52 countries have been performed on the Eurovision stage as of 2026. The contest has seen numerous changes since its inauguration, such as the introduction of relegation in the 1990s, and subsequently semi-finals in the 2000s, as a response to growing numbers of interested participants. The rules of the contest have also seen multiple changes over the years, with the voting system and language criteria being modified on several occasions.

The Eurovision Song Contest is the longest-running annual international televised music competition in the world, as determined by Guinness World Records, and around 40 countries now regularly take part each year. Several other competitions have been inspired by Eurovision in the years since its formation, and the EBU has also created a number of complimentary contests which focus on other aspects of music and culture. The 2020 edition of the contest was the first to be cancelled, as no competitive event was able to take place due to the COVID-19 pandemic.

== Competition overview ==
Table key
| ◇ | Contest cancelled |

| Edition | Year | Date of final | Host broadcaster(s) | Venue | Host city | Countries | | Winning country | Ref |
| Edition | Year | Date of final | Host broadcaster(s) | Venue | Host city | Total | Final | Winning country | Ref |
|---|---|---|---|---|---|---|---|---|---|
| 1st | 1956 | 24 May | SRG SSR/RSI | Teatro Kursaal | Lugano | 7 (Note: Each country in the first contest was represented by two songs.) | | Switzerland | |
| 2nd | 1957 | 3 March | ARD/HR | Großer Sendesaal des Hessischen Rundfunks | Frankfurt | 10 | | Netherlands | |
| 3rd | 1958 | 12 March | NTS | AVRO Studios | Hilversum | 10 | | France | |
| 4th | 1959 | 11 March | RTF | Palais des Festivals | Cannes | 11 | | Netherlands | |
| 5th | 1960 | 29 March | BBC | Royal Festival Hall | London | 13 | | France | |
| 6th | 1961 | 18 March | RTF | Palais des Festivals | Cannes | 16 | | Luxembourg | |
| 7th | 1962 | 18 March | CLT | Villa Louvigny | Luxembourg City | 16 | | France | |
| 8th | 1963 | 23 March | BBC | BBC Television Centre | London | 16 | | Denmark | |
| 9th | 1964 | 21 March | DR | Tivolis Koncertsal | Copenhagen | 16 | | Italy | |
| 10th | 1965 | 20 March | RAI | Sala di Concerto della RAI | Naples | 18 | | Luxembourg | |
| 11th | 1966 | 5 March | CLT | Villa Louvigny | Luxembourg City | 18 | | Austria | |
| 12th | 1967 | 8 April | ORF | Großer Festsaal der Wiener Hofburg | Vienna | 17 | | United Kingdom | |
| 13th | 1968 | 6 April | BBC | Royal Albert Hall | London | 17 | | Spain | |
| 14th | 1969 | 29 March | TVE | Teatro Real | Madrid | 16 | | France; Netherlands; Spain; United Kingdom | |
| 15th | 1970 | 21 March | NOS | RAI Expositie-en-Congrescentrum | Amsterdam | 12 | | Ireland | |
| 16th | 1971 | 3 April | RTÉ | Gaiety Theatre | Dublin | 18 | | Monaco | |
| 17th | 1972 | 25 March | BBC | Usher Hall | Edinburgh | 18 | | Luxembourg | |
| 18th | 1973 | 7 April | CLT | Nouveau Théâtre Municipal | Luxembourg City | 17 | | Luxembourg | |
| 19th | 1974 | 6 April | BBC | Brighton Dome | Brighton | 17 | | Sweden | |
| 20th | 1975 | 22 March | SR | Stockholmsmässan | Stockholm | 19 | | Netherlands | |
| 21st | 1976 | 3 April | NOS | Nederlands Congresgebouw | The Hague | 18 | | United Kingdom | |
| 22nd | 1977 | 7 May (Note: The 1977 contest was originally scheduled for 2 April, but a strike by BBC camera operators and technicians resulted in a postponement until 7 May.) | BBC | Wembley Conference Centre | London | 18 | | France | |
| 23rd | 1978 | 22 April | TF1 | Palais des Congrès de Paris | Paris | 20 | | Israel | |
| 24th | 1979 | 31 March | IBA | International Convention Centre | Jerusalem | 19 | | Israel | |
| 25th | 1980 | 19 April | NOS | Nederlands Congres Centrum | The Hague | 19 | | Ireland | |
| 26th | 1981 | 4 April | RTÉ | RDS Simmonscourt | Dublin | 20 | | United Kingdom | |
| 27th | 1982 | 24 April | BBC | Harrogate International Centre | Harrogate | 18 | | Germany | |
| 28th | 1983 | 23 April | ARD/BR | Rudi-Sedlmayer-Halle | Munich | 20 | | Luxembourg | |
| 29th | 1984 | 5 May | RTL | Théâtre Municipal de la Ville de Luxembourg | Luxembourg City | 19 | | Sweden | |
| 30th | 1985 | 4 May | SVT | Scandinavium | Gothenburg | 19 | | Norway | |
| 31st | 1986 | 3 May | NRK | Grieghallen | Bergen | 20 | | Belgium | |
| 32nd | 1987 | 9 May | RTBF | Palais de Centenaire | Brussels | 22 | | Ireland | |
| 33rd | 1988 | 30 April | RTÉ | RDS Simmonscourt | Dublin | 21 | | Switzerland | |
| 34th | 1989 | 6 May | SRG SSR/TSR | Palais de Beaulieu | Lausanne | 22 | | Yugoslavia | |
| 35th | 1990 | 5 May | JRT/RTZ | Vatroslav Lisinski Concert Hall | Zagreb | 22 | | Italy | |
| 36th | 1991 | 4 May | RAI | Cinecittà (Studio 15) | Rome | 22 | | Sweden | |
| 37th | 1992 | 9 May | SVT | Malmö Isstadion | Malmö | 23 | | Ireland | |
| 38th | 1993 | 15 May | RTÉ | Green Glens Arena | Millstreet | 25 | | Ireland | |
| 39th | 1994 | 30 April | RTÉ | Point Theatre | Dublin | 25 | | Ireland | |
| 40th | 1995 | 13 May | RTÉ | Point Theatre | Dublin | 23 | | Norway | |
| 41st | 1996 | 18 May | NRK | Oslo Spektrum | Oslo | 23 | | Ireland | |
| 42nd | 1997 | 3 May | RTÉ | Point Theatre | Dublin | 25 | | United Kingdom | |
| 43rd | 1998 | 9 May | BBC | National Indoor Arena | Birmingham | 25 | | Israel | |
| 44th | 1999 | 29 May | IBA | International Convention Centre | Jerusalem | 23 | | Sweden | |
| 45th | 2000 | 13 May | SVT | Stockholm Globe Arena | Stockholm | 24 | | Denmark | |
| 46th | 2001 | 12 May | DR | Parken Stadium | Copenhagen | 23 | | Estonia | |
| 47th | 2002 | 25 May | ETV | Saku Suurhall | Tallinn | 24 | | Latvia | |
| 48th | 2003 | 24 May | LTV | Skonto Hall | Riga | 26 | | Turkey | |
| 49th | 2004 | 15 May | TRT | Abdi İpekçi Arena | Istanbul | 36 | 24 | Ukraine | |
| 50th | 2005 | 21 May | NTU | Palace of Sports | Kyiv | 39 | 24 | Greece | |
| 51st | 2006 | 20 May | ERT | O.A.C.A. Olympic Indoor Hall | Athens | 37 | 24 | Finland | |
| 52nd | 2007 | 12 May | YLE | Hartwall Areena | Helsinki | 42 | 24 | Serbia | |
| 53rd | 2008 | 24 May | RTS | Belgrade Arena | Belgrade | 43 | 25 | Russia | |
| 54th | 2009 | 16 May | C1R | Olimpiyskiy Arena | Moscow | 42 | 25 | Norway | |
| 55th | 2010 | 29 May | NRK | Telenor Arena | Oslo | 39 | 25 | Germany | |
| 56th | 2011 | 14 May | ARD/NDR | Esprit Arena | Düsseldorf | 43 | 25 | Azerbaijan | |
| 57th | 2012 | 26 May | İTV | Baku Crystal Hall | Baku | 42 | 26 | Sweden | |
| 58th | 2013 | 18 May | SVT | Malmö Arena | Malmö | 39 | 26 | Denmark | |
| 59th | 2014 | 10 May | DR | B&W Hallerne | Copenhagen | 37 | 26 | Austria | |
| 60th | 2015 | 23 May | ORF | Wiener Stadthalle | Vienna | 40 | 27 | Sweden | |
| 61st | 2016 | 14 May | SVT | Ericsson Globe | Stockholm | 42 | 26 | Ukraine | |
| 62nd | 2017 | 13 May | UA:PBC | International Exhibition Centre | Kyiv | 42 | 26 | Portugal | |
| 63rd | 2018 | 12 May | RTP | Altice Arena | Lisbon | 43 | 26 | Israel | |
| 64th | 2019 | 18 May | IPBC | Expo Tel Aviv | Tel Aviv | 41 | 26 | Netherlands | |
| 65th | 2020 | 16 May ◇ | NPO, NOS and AVROTROS ◇ | Rotterdam Ahoy ◇ | Rotterdam ◇ | 41 ◇ | 26 ◇ | No winner | |
| 65th | 2021 | 22 May | NPO, NOS and AVROTROS | Rotterdam Ahoy | Rotterdam | 39 | 26 | Italy | |
| 66th | 2022 | 14 May | RAI | Palasport Olimpico | Turin | 40 | 25 | Ukraine | |
| 67th | 2023 | 13 May | BBC | M&S Bank Arena Liverpool | Liverpool | 37 | 26 | Sweden | |
| 68th | 2024 | 11 May | SVT | Malmö Arena | Malmö | 37 | 25 (Note: 26 countries were set to perform, but the Netherlands was disqualified from the contest between the second semi-final and the final.) | Switzerland | |
| 69th | 2025 | 17 May | SRG SSR | St. Jakobshalle | Basel | 37 | 26 | Austria | |
| 70th | 2026 | 16 May | ORF | Wiener Stadthalle | Vienna | 35 | 25 | Bulgaria | |
| 71st | 2027 | 15 May | BNT | Arena Burgas | Burgas | 36 | 25 | TBD | |

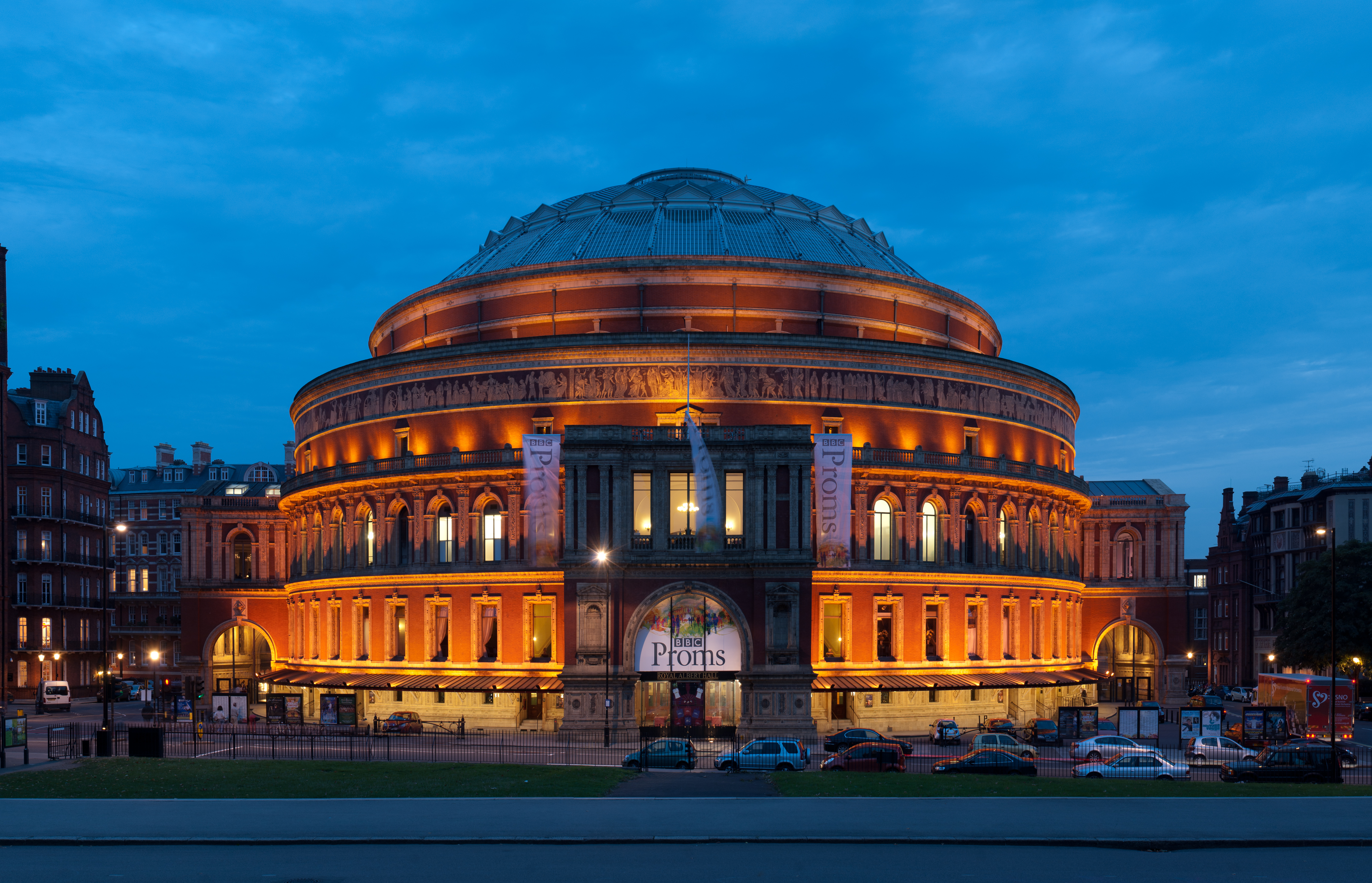
London: Royal Albert Hall, venue of the 1968 contest.

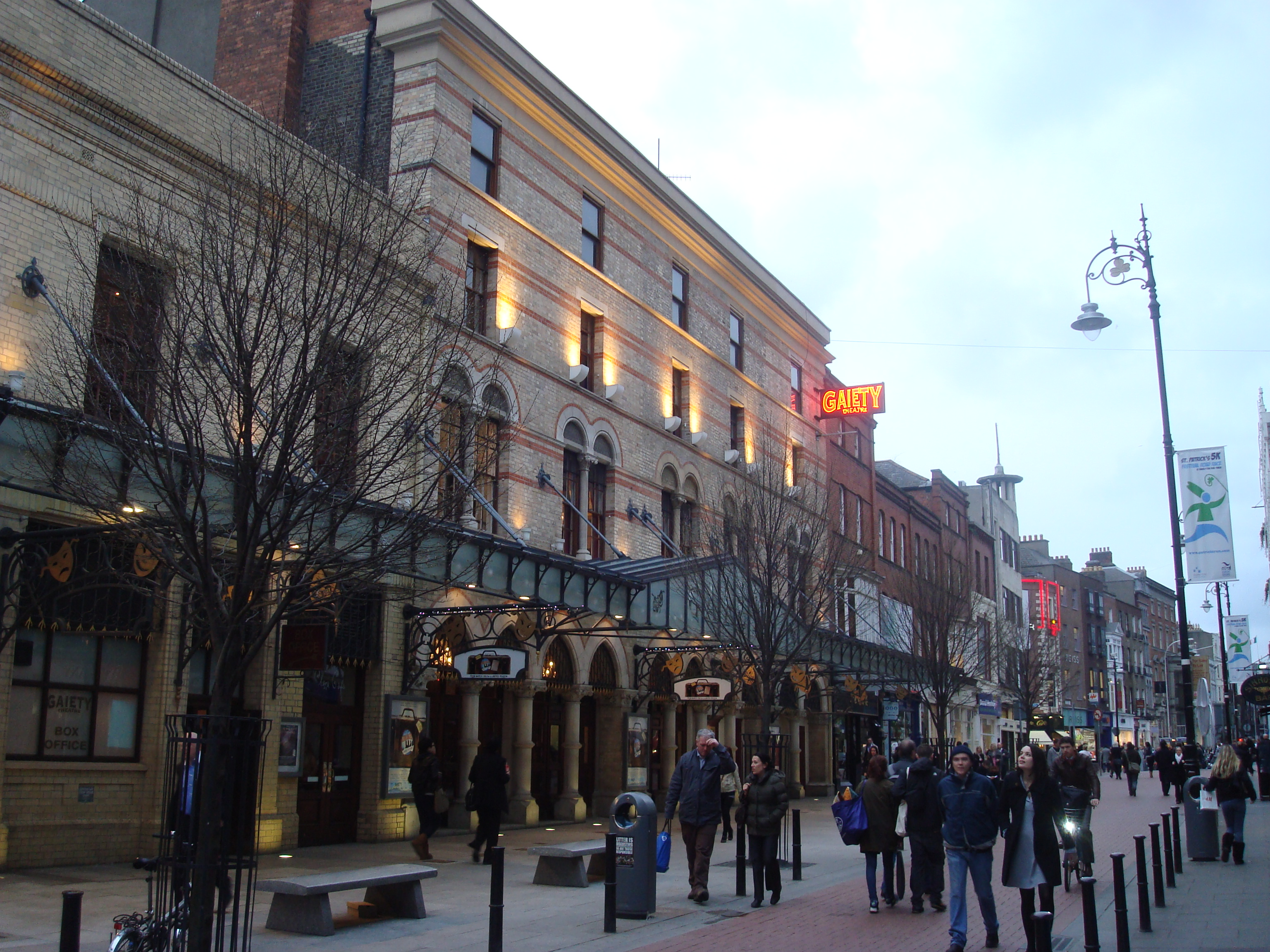
Dublin: Gaiety Theatre, venue of the 1971 contest.

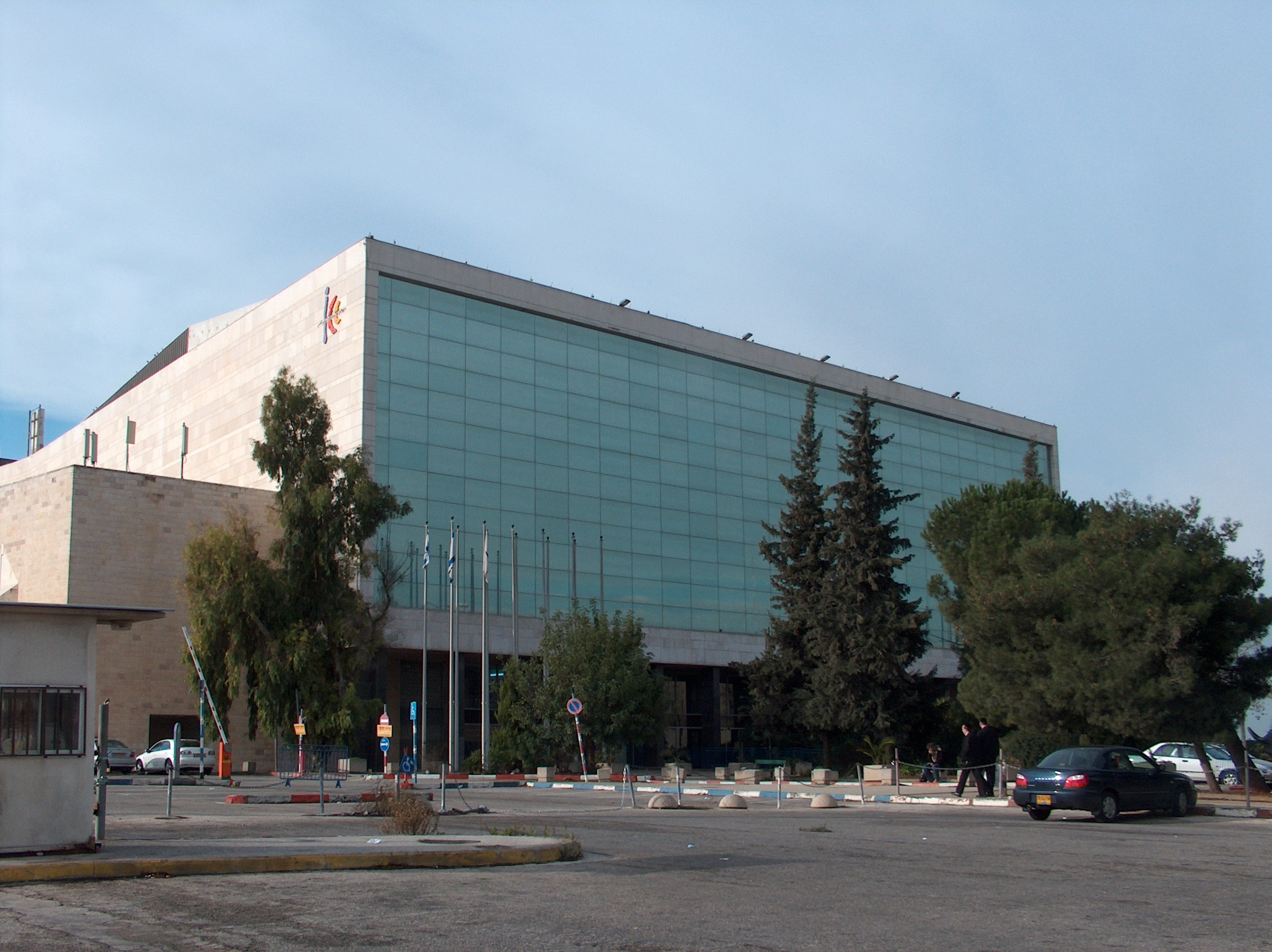
Jerusalem: International Convention Centre, venue of the 1979 and 1999 contests.

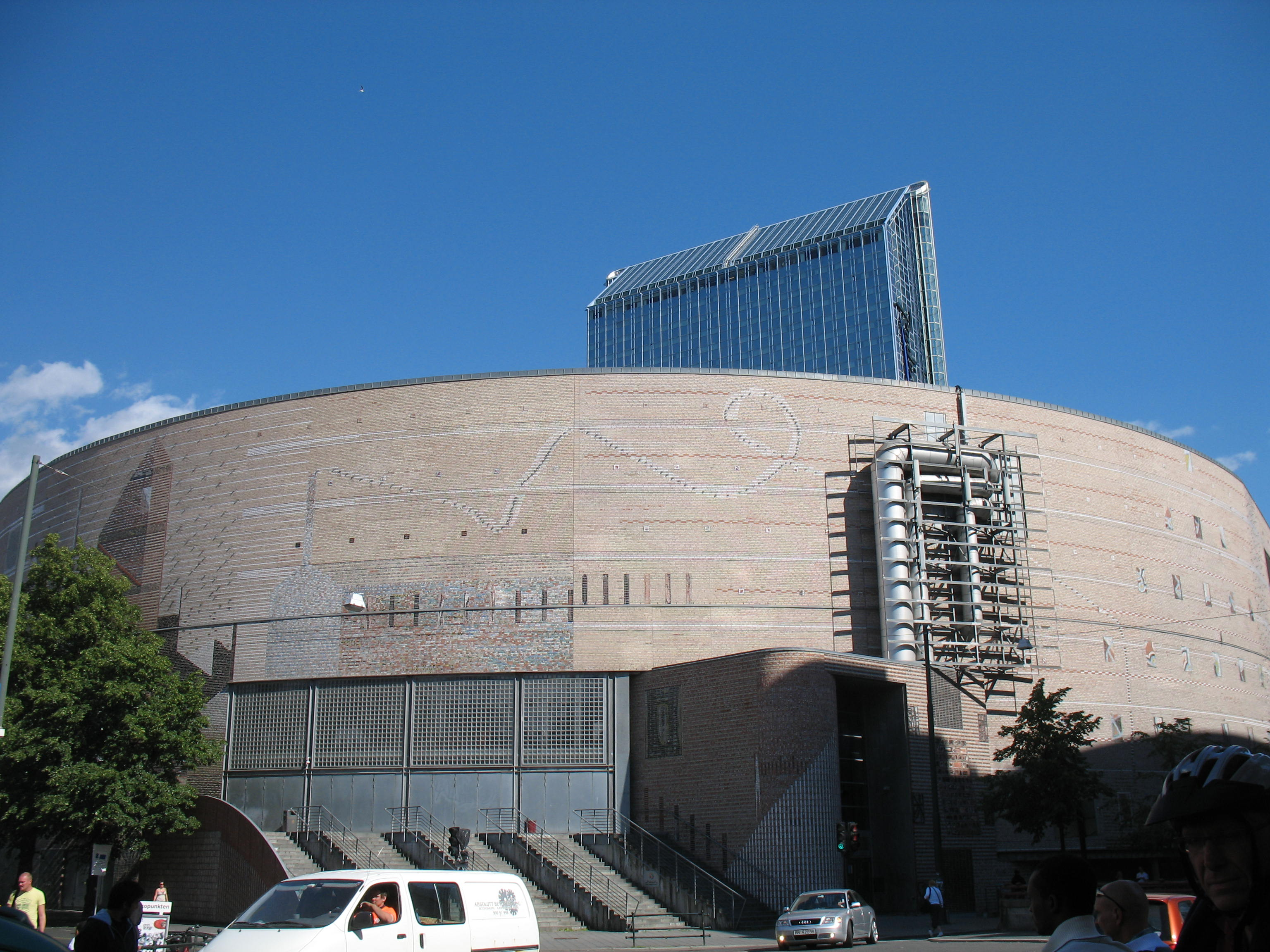
Oslo: Oslo Spektrum, venue of the 1996 contest.

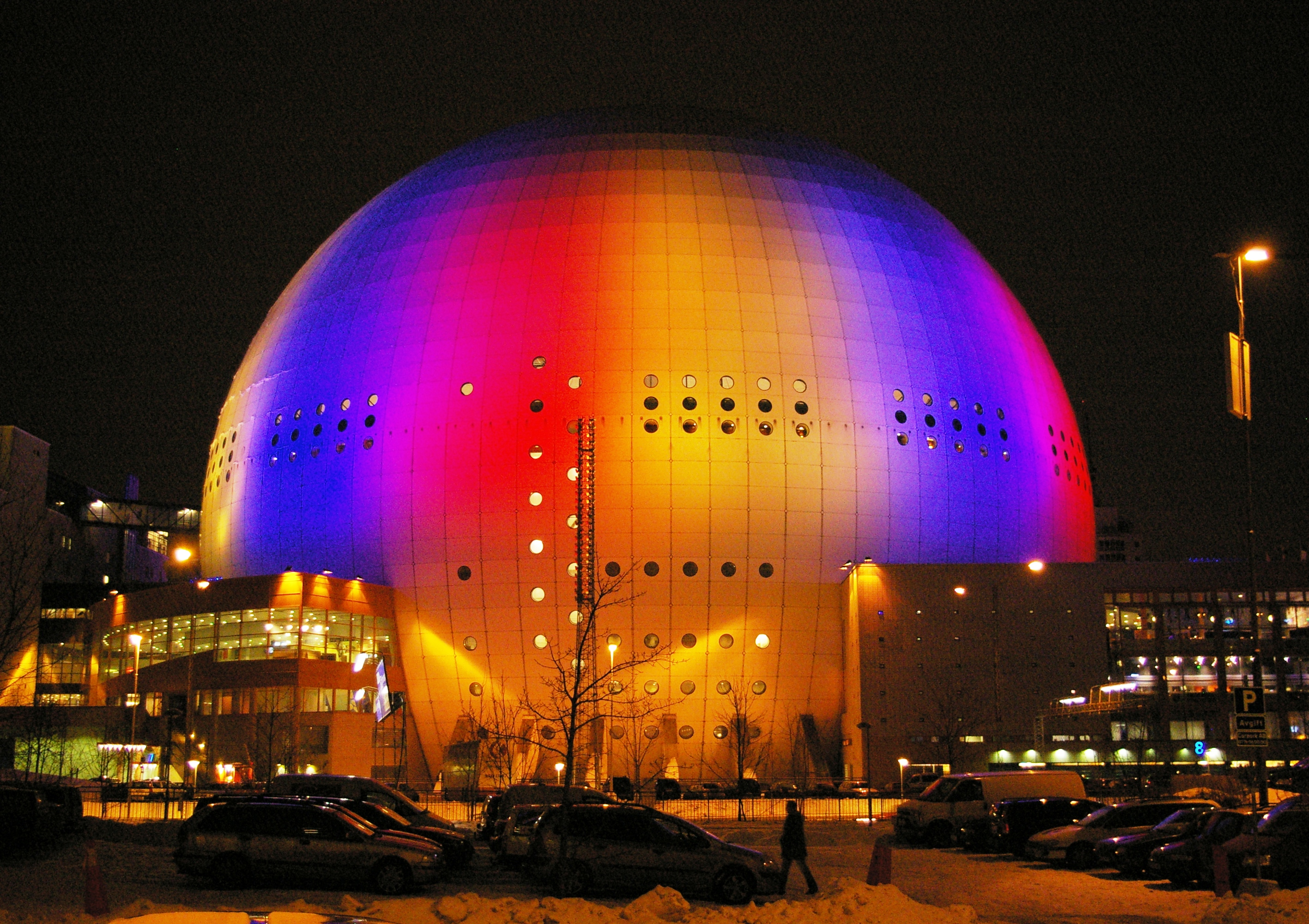
Stockholm: Globe Arena, venue of the 2000 and 2016 contests.

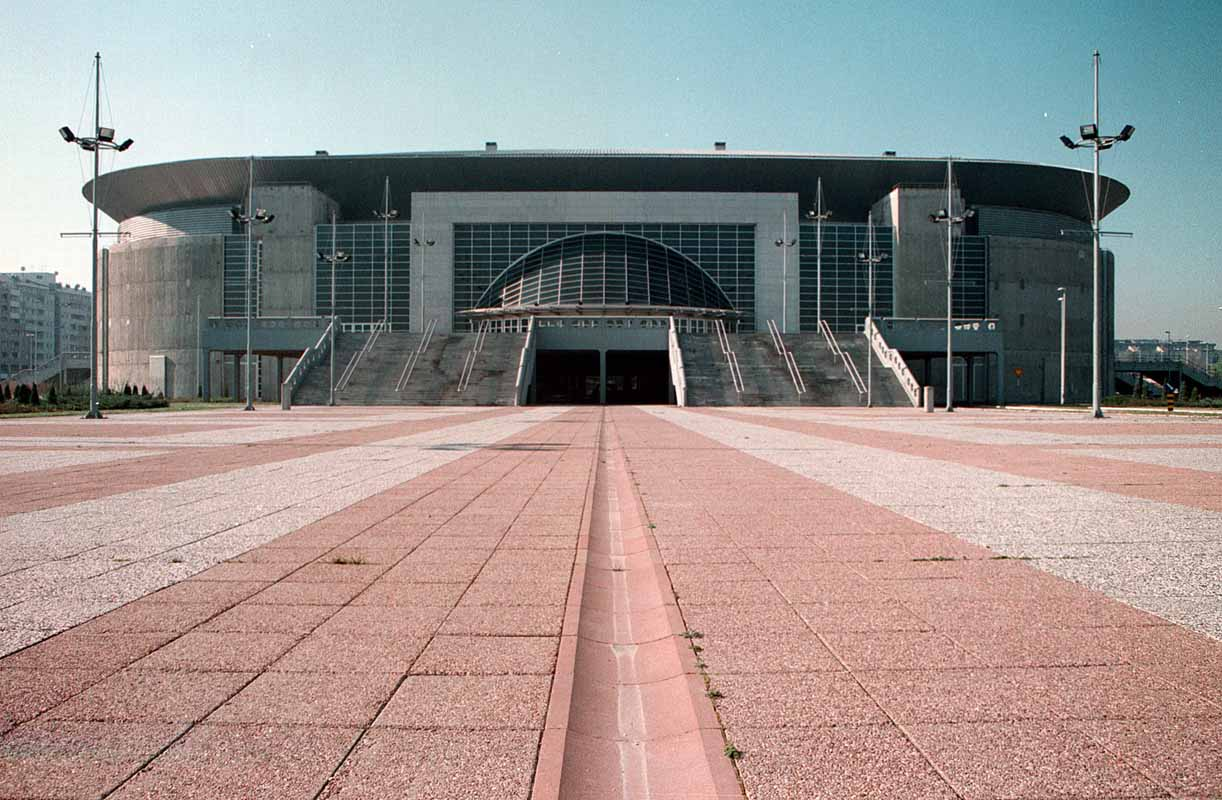
Belgrade: Belgrade Arena, venue of the 2008 contest.

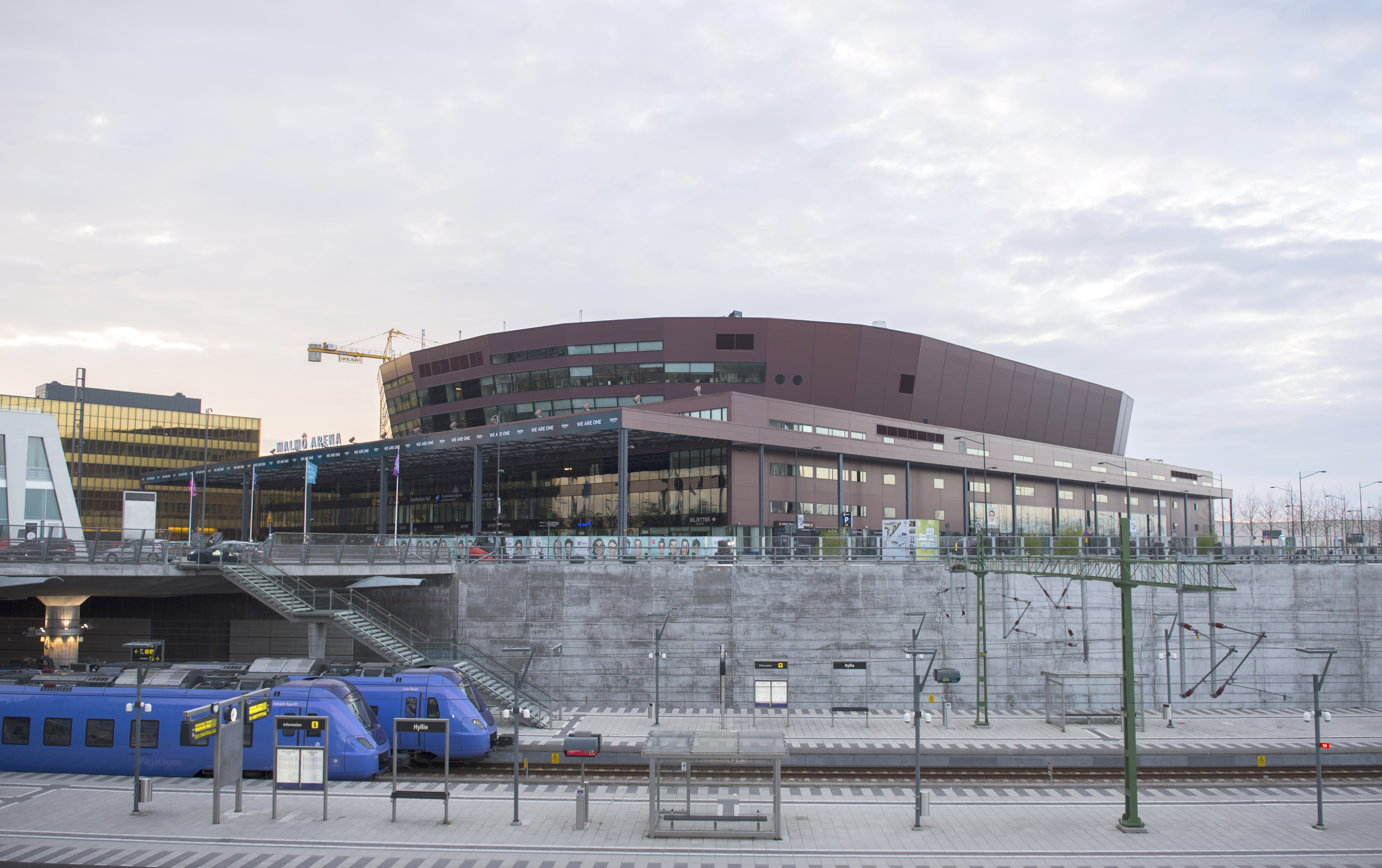
Malmö: Malmö Arena, venue of the 2013 and 2024 contests.

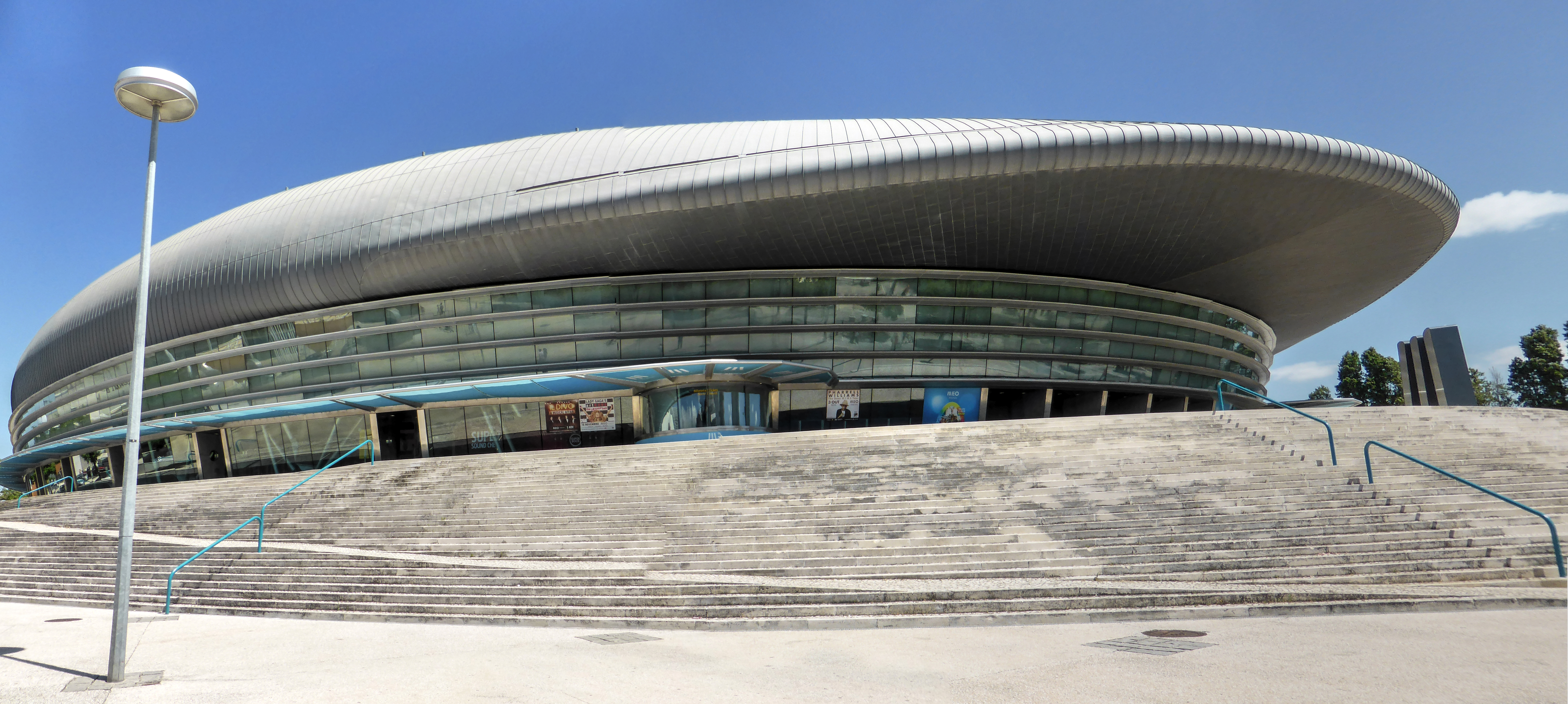
Lisbon: Altice Arena, venue of the 2018 contest.

=== Contest themes and slogans ===
An individual slogan has been associated with each edition of the contest since 2002, with the exception of 2009. This slogan is decided by the host broadcaster and is then used to develop the contest's visual identity and design. This slogan is typically used by the producers in planning and formulating the show's visual identity, and is channelled into the contest's stage design, the opening and interval acts, and the "postcards": short videos interspersed between the entries which usually highlight the host country, and in many cases introduce the competing acts. The slogan of the 2023 contest, "United by Music", was announced on 14 November 2023 to be retained for future editions of the event. For the 2025 contest in Basel, Switzerland, the host broadcaster SRG SSR introduced a motto for that year's event, "Welcome Home", which was included in addition to the "United by Music" slogan within the visual identity and design.

Individual contest slogans
| Year | Host city | Slogan |
|---|---|---|
| 2002 | Tallinn | A Modern Fairytale |
| 2003 | Riga | A Magical Rendez-vous |
| 2004 | Istanbul | Under the Same Sky |
| 2005 | Kyiv | Awakening |
| 2006 | Athens | Feel the Rhythm |
| 2007 | Helsinki | True Fantasy |
| 2008 | Belgrade | Confluence of Sound |
| 2009 | Moscow | United Colors of Music |
| 2010 | Oslo | Share the Moment |
| 2011 | Düsseldorf | Feel Your Heart Beat! |
| 2012 | Baku | Light Your Fire! |
| 2013 | Malmö | We Are One |
| 2014 | Copenhagen | #JoinUs |
| 2015 | Vienna | Building Bridges |
| 2016 | Stockholm | Come Together |
| 2017 | Kyiv | Celebrate Diversity |
| 2018 | Lisbon | All Aboard! |
| 2019 | Tel Aviv | Dare to Dream |
| 2020 | Rotterdam ◇ | Open Up ◇ |
| 2021 | Rotterdam | Open Up |
| 2022 | Turin | The Sound of Beauty |
| 2023 | Liverpool | United by Music (Note: Originally used for 2023 and later applied to all future editions of the contest) |
| 2024 | Malmö | United by Music |
| 2025 | Basel | United by Music |
| 2026 | Vienna | United by Music |
| 2027 | Burgas | United by Music |

== Origins ==
The European Broadcasting Union (EBU) was formed in 1950, when the British Broadcasting Corporation (BBC) hosted a conference with 23 organisations at the Imperial Hotel in Torquay, England, with the aim of establishing cooperation on creative endeavours and setting a foundation for the exchange of television programmes across borders. "Eurovision" as a term in telecommunications was first used by British journalist George Campey in the Evening Standard in 1951, when he referred to a BBC programme being relayed by Dutch television; the EBU's Eurovision transmission network was subsequently founded in 1954, at the time formed of a series of microwave links across Europe.

In the years following the formation of the EBU a number of big events were transmitted via their infrastructure, including the coronation of Elizabeth II, which was broadcast in France, Belgium, the Netherlands, and Germany, in addition to the United Kingdom. In September 1953, an EBU meeting in London resulted in a series of international exchange programmes organised the following year, entitled the "European Television Season", and relayed live across Europe through the Eurovision network. The first of these programmes was shown on 6 June 1954, showing coverage of the Narcissus Festival held in Montreux, Switzerland, followed by a tour of Vatican City. Further events were broadcast over the following days, including the Palio di Siena, an athletics meet in Glasgow, a parade by the Royal Navy passing Queen Elizabeth II, and live transmission of football matches from the 1954 FIFA World Cup in Switzerland, the first time the FIFA World Cup was accompanied by live television coverage.

Following this summer season of programmes, the EBU formed a "Programme Committee" to investigate new initiatives for cooperation between broadcasters each year, with Marcel Bezençon, Director-General of the Swiss Broadcasting Corporation (SRG SSR), serving as the committee's first President, and Rene McCall, deputy director of the BBC, and Jean d'Arcy, Director of the French broadcaster Radiodiffusion-Télévision Française (RTF), serving as Vice Presidents. This committee met in Monte Carlo in January 1955, and approved two new projects for further study: a European song competition, initially proposed by Sergio Pugliese from the Italian broadcaster Radiotelevisione italiana (RAI), and a contest of amateur entertainers; the latter idea was eventually discarded. On 19 October 1955, at the annual General Assembly of the EBU, held in the Palazzo Corsini in Rome under the Presidency of the Director-General of the BBC Sir Ian Jacob, the EBU agreed to the organising of the song contest, under the initial title of the European Grand Prix, and accepted a proposal by the Swiss delegation to host the event in Lugano in the spring of 1956. A planning sub-group was formed to establish the rules of the competition, headed by Eduard Hass of SRG SSR, which used the Italian Sanremo Music Festival as a basis for their work, with several amendments and additions made to better reflect this new international version.

== 1950s ==
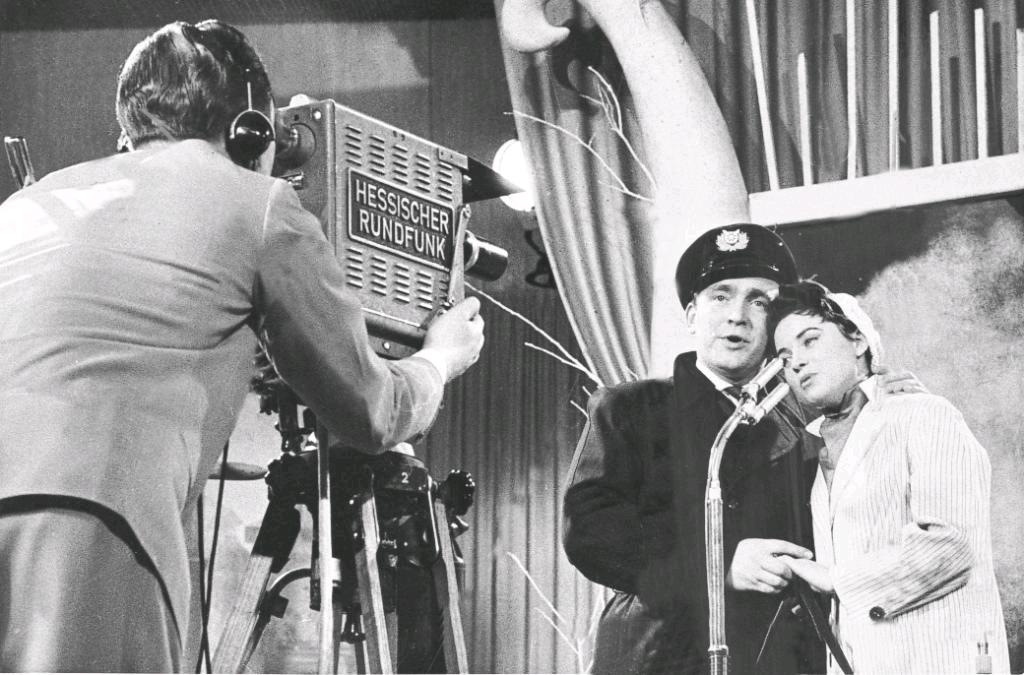
Gustav Winckler and Birthe Wilke, representing Denmark at the 1957 contest in Frankfurt.

The Eurovision Song Contest 1956 was the first edition of the contest, organised by Radio svizzera italiana (RSI) on behalf of the Swiss Broadcasting Corporation (SRG SSR) and held on 24 May 1956 at the Teatro Kursaal in Lugano, Switzerland. The regulations for this first contest allowed one participating broadcast organisation from each country to submit two songs of between 3 and 3½ minutes in length, the only edition to permit more than one song per country. Each country was strongly encouraged to hold a national contest to select their competing entries. Seven countries entered the inaugural contest, with entries received from Belgium, France, West Germany, Italy, Luxembourg, the Netherlands and Switzerland. Voting in this first contest was held behind closed doors: two jury members from each country situated at the venue ranked the competing songs, including those of their own country. Switzerland's Lys Assia was crowned the contest's first winner, with the song "Refrain". Only the overall winner of the contest was announced at its conclusion, and the full results have never been made public. No known video footage of the event is known to survive beyond newsreel of the winning reprise; audio of most of the contest however does exist.

The Eurovision Song Contest 1957 was the second edition of the contest, organised by Hessischer Rundfunk (HR) on behalf of ARD and held on 3 March 1957 at the Großer Sendesaal des hessischen Rundfunks in Frankfurt, West Germany. Early rules established that a different broadcaster would take on the task of organising the contest each year, and Germany was selected to host the 1957 event. Ten countries entered this second contest, with the seven original broadcasters joined by Austria, Denmark and the United Kingdom, with each country submitting one song for consideration. Taking inspiration from the Festival of British Popular Songs, organised by the BBC in August 1956 which included a scoreboard and voting by regional juries, the contest organisers decided to incorporate these ideas into the pan-European contest, allowing viewers at home to follow the voting procedure. A new voting system was introduced in tandem, with a jury of ten members in each country casting a single vote for their favourite song; jury members from one country could not vote for the song of their own country, a rule which still applies to the present day. The Netherlands was voted the winner, represented by Corry Brokken with the song "Net als toen".

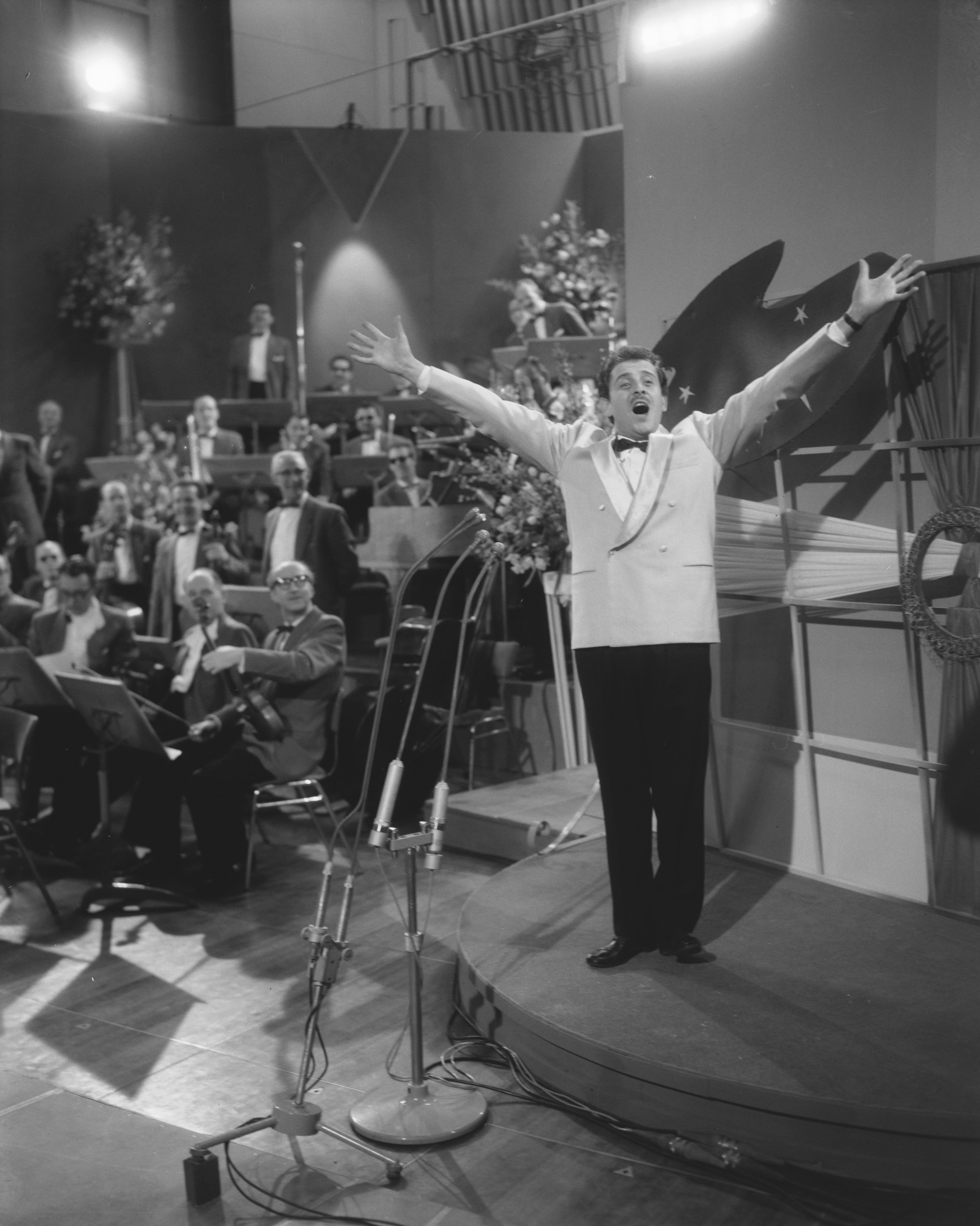
Italy's Domenico Modugno performing in a rehearsal ahead of the 1958 contest in Hilversum.

The Eurovision Song Contest 1958 was the third edition of the contest, organised by Nederlandse Televisie Stichting (NTS) and held on 12 March 1958 at the AVRO Studios in Hilversum, Netherlands. This marked the first time that the winning country of the previous edition was given the honour of hosting, setting a precedent that continues to be observed. The United Kingdom decided not to compete in this edition, however Sweden made its debut, keeping the total number of competing countries at ten. A new rule limiting the duration of each competing entry to 3 minutes was introduced, prompted by the previous year's contest when the Italian entry lasted for over 5 minutes. France gained its first win in the contest, represented by André Claveau and "Dors, mon amour". Despite only placing third, Italy's "Nel blu, dipinto di blu", popularly known as "Volare" and performed by Domenico Modugno, would go on to greater commercial success than the winning song, hitting number one on the US Billboard Hot 100 and being recorded by various artists over the years, with combined sales of over 22 million copies worldwide.

The Eurovision Song Contest 1959 was the fourth edition of the contest, organised by Radiodiffusion-Télévision Française (RTF) and held on 11 March 1959 at the Palais des Festivals in Cannes, France. 11 countries competed in this edition, which saw the United Kingdom returning to the contest along with new entrants Monaco, while Luxembourg decided to withdraw. The Netherlands's Teddy Scholten was crowned the winner with the song "Een beetje", becoming the first country to win the contest twice. This contest also marked the only time that the top three entries were given a reprise performance, with the United Kingdom's Pearl Carr & Teddy Johnson and France's Jean Philippe also performing for a second time at the broadcast's conclusion.

== 1960s ==
The Eurovision Song Contest 1960 was the fifth edition of the contest, organised by the British Broadcasting Corporation (BBC) and held on 29 March 1960 at the Royal Festival Hall in London, United Kingdom. Dutch broadcaster NTS declined the opportunity to stage the event for the second time in three years, leading the EBU to approach the BBC to host the event as the previous year's runner-up. The number of competing countries grew to 13, as Luxembourg returned and Norway sent its first entry. France recorded their second contest win, with Jacqueline Boyer taking the title with "Tom Pillibi".

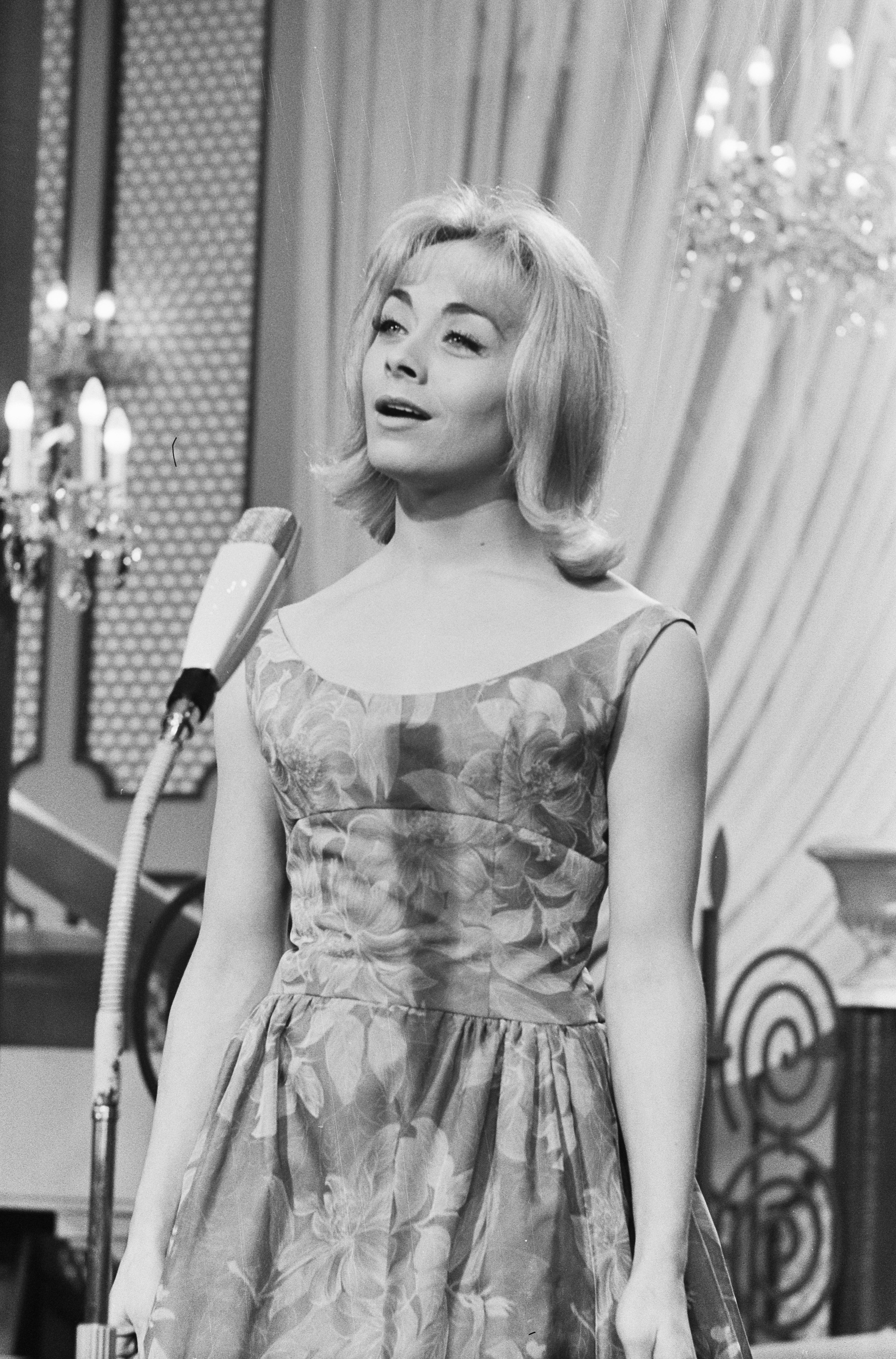
Isabelle Aubret gave France its third win in five years, when she won the 1962 contest in Luxembourg City.

The Eurovision Song Contest 1961 was the sixth edition of the contest, organised by RTF and held on 18 March 1961 at the Palais des Festivals in Cannes, France. France became the first country to host two contests, with the Palais des Festivals having also hosted the 1959 event. This was also the first contest to be held on a Saturday night, which has now become the standard time-slot for the contest's final. A record 16 countries competed in this year's event, with debut entries from Finland, Spain and Yugoslavia. Luxembourg became the fourth country to win the Eurovision title, with French singer Jean-Claude Pascal giving the Grand Duchy their first win with "Nous les amoureux".

The Eurovision Song Contest 1962 was the seventh edition of the contest, organised by Compagnie Luxembourgeoise de Radiodiffusion (CLT) and held on 18 March 1962 at the Grand Auditorium de RTL, Villa Louvigny in Luxembourg City, Luxembourg. For the first time there was no change in the countries competing, with the same line-up seen as in 1961. A new voting system was implemented at this contest, with each country now giving 3, 2 and 1 points to the top three songs as determined by the combined votes of the assembled jury. France's Isabelle Aubret was crowned the winner with "Un premier amour", giving France its third victory in five years.

The Eurovision Song Contest 1963 was the eighth edition of the contest, organised by the BBC and held on 23 March 1963 at the BBC Television Centre in London, United Kingdom. France's RTF had declined the offer to stage the contest once again, and the BBC stepped in to host the contest for the second time. A modification of the voting system used in 1962 was adopted, with countries now giving 5, 4, 3, 2 and 1 points for their favourite songs. In a close fought contest for first place between Denmark and Switzerland, Grethe and Jørgen Ingmann emerged victorious with "Dansevise" for Denmark, giving the Scandinavian country their first victory on the final vote.

The Eurovision Song Contest 1964 was the ninth edition of the contest, organised by Danmarks Radio (DR) and held on 21 March 1964 at the Tivoli Concert Hall in Copenhagen, Denmark. Sweden were forced to withdraw due to industrial action by the Swedish Musicians' Union, however as Portugal made its debut appearance the total number of competing countries remained at 16. Another modification of the voting system now saw each country giving 5, 3 and 1 points to the top 3 songs based on the total of all votes cast by jury members, with each jury member having three votes to distribute among the songs; if all members voted for only two songs, these would get 6 and 3 points, and if all members voted for the same song it would get 9 points. This event marked the first time that the contest was interrupted by a protester, when a man demonstrating against the right-wing dictatorships of Spain and Portugal and the inclusion of these countries in the contest entered the stage holding a banner stating "Boycott Franco and Salazar", before being quickly removed as cameras cut to a shot of the scoreboard. No footage of this protest remains however as, like the 1956 contest, no video footage of the contest is known to exist, but footage of the opening sequence and the winning reprise, as well as audio recordings are known to survive. Italy's Gigliola Cinquetti scored a landslide victory with the song "Non ho l'età", gaining almost three times as many points as the United Kingdom in second place and giving Italy its first Eurovision win.

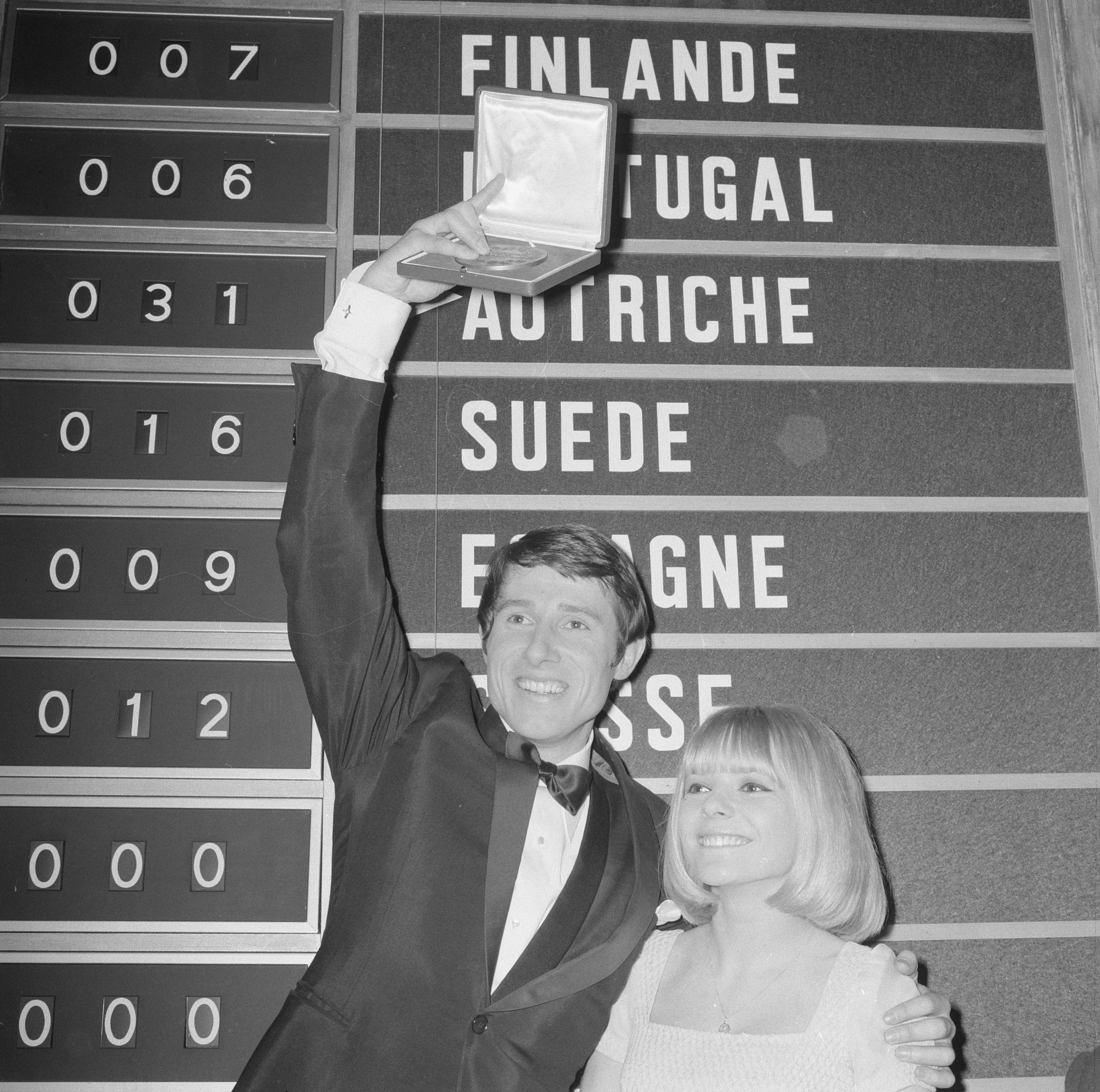
France Gall and Udo Jürgens at the 1966 contest in Luxembourg City, as Jürgens celebrates his win for Austria.

The Eurovision Song Contest 1965 was the tenth edition of the contest, organised by Radiotelevisione italiana (RAI) and held on 20 March 1965 at the Sala di Concerto della RAI in Naples, Italy. A record 18 countries competed in this anniversary event, with Sweden making its return and Ireland making its debut. With the contest being picked up by the Eastern Europe Intervision network and broadcast in countries such as the Soviet Union, Czechoslovakia, Poland, Hungary and East Germany for the first time, the 1965 contest was the biggest yet with an estimated global audience of 150 million viewers. Sweden's entry caused some controversy when their entry was performed in English, rather than in their national language Swedish; as there was no rule in place to dictate in what language a country could perform this was allowed despite protest from other competing countries. Luxembourg won for the second time, with French chanteuse France Gall performing "Poupée de cire, poupée de son". It was the first time that a pop song had won the contest, which would become an international hit for Gall, and would have an influence on the type of songs entered into the contest in years to come.

Ahead of the 1966 contest, the EBU invited broadcasters to submit proposals on ideas they believed should be introduced in future editions. This was prompted by concerns from CLT on their ability to stage the next event. Some ideas in common among several broadcasters included: the introduction of semi-finals to reduce the number of competing acts, with some also suggesting that competing countries should be split on a geographic or linguistic basis; music experts having a 50% stake in the result to enable more of an emphasis being placed on musical quality; and a tightening of the rules on language and submission cut-off, with the creation of an executive supervisor role in order to oversee the contest and raise production standards. Further proposals on changes to the contest included holding the event over multiple locations, with performances and hosting duties split across two or three different competing countries; this proposal was rejected following concerns raised that musical quality and consistency would suffer in a contest held across multiple locations and with multiple orchestras, and that the risk of technical failure would also increase by using multiple venues. The EBU went on to adopt a number of the suggestions raised, with the following contest featuring music experts in the national juries, and the implementation of a language rule stipulating that songs must be performed in one of the national languages of the participating country. Other changes, such as semi-finals and splitting countries by set criteria, would subsequently be revisited in decades to come.

The Eurovision Song Contest 1966 was the eleventh edition of the contest, organised by CLT and held on 5 March 1966 at the Grand Auditorium de RTL, Villa Louvigny in Luxembourg City, Luxembourg. This marked Luxembourg's second contest as host broadcaster, using the same venue as that in 1962. This contest saw the first performance by a black artist at Eurovision, when Milly Scott represented the Netherlands. Udo Jürgens secured Austria's first win with "Merci, Chérie"; this was Jürgens' third attempt at victory, having previously finished 6th in 1964 and 4th in 1965.

The Eurovision Song Contest 1967 was the twelfth edition of the contest, organised by Österreichischer Rundfunk (ORF) and held on 8 April 1967 at the Großer Festsaal der Wiener Hofburg in Vienna, Austria. Denmark withdraw from this contest, reducing the number of competing countries to 17. The scoring system last used in 1961, with ten members casting a single vote for their favourite, was reintroduced, with at least half of the jury members in each country required to be less than 30 years old. A number of other innovations introduced for the first time at this contest, such as shots of the green room during the voting process and each country's broadcaster appointing an official representative, have since become integral parts of the present-day contest. The United Kingdom's Sandie Shaw won the contest with "Puppet on a String" in a landslide victory, with the UK gaining more than twice as many votes as the runner-up Ireland to gain its first Eurovision title.

The Eurovision Song Contest 1968 was the thirteenth edition of the contest, organised by the BBC and held on 6 April 1968 at the Royal Albert Hall in London, United Kingdom. This was the first edition of the contest to be produced in colour. A tight voting sequence saw Spain and the United Kingdom vie for first place by the end, with the votes of the final juries being decisive in favour of Spain's Massiel by just one vote. Spanish broadcaster TVE had originally selected Joan Manuel Serrat as its representative, but when he demanded to sing "La La La" in Catalan in the contest, TVE replaced him with Massiel who sang the song in Spanish and ultimately won the contest.

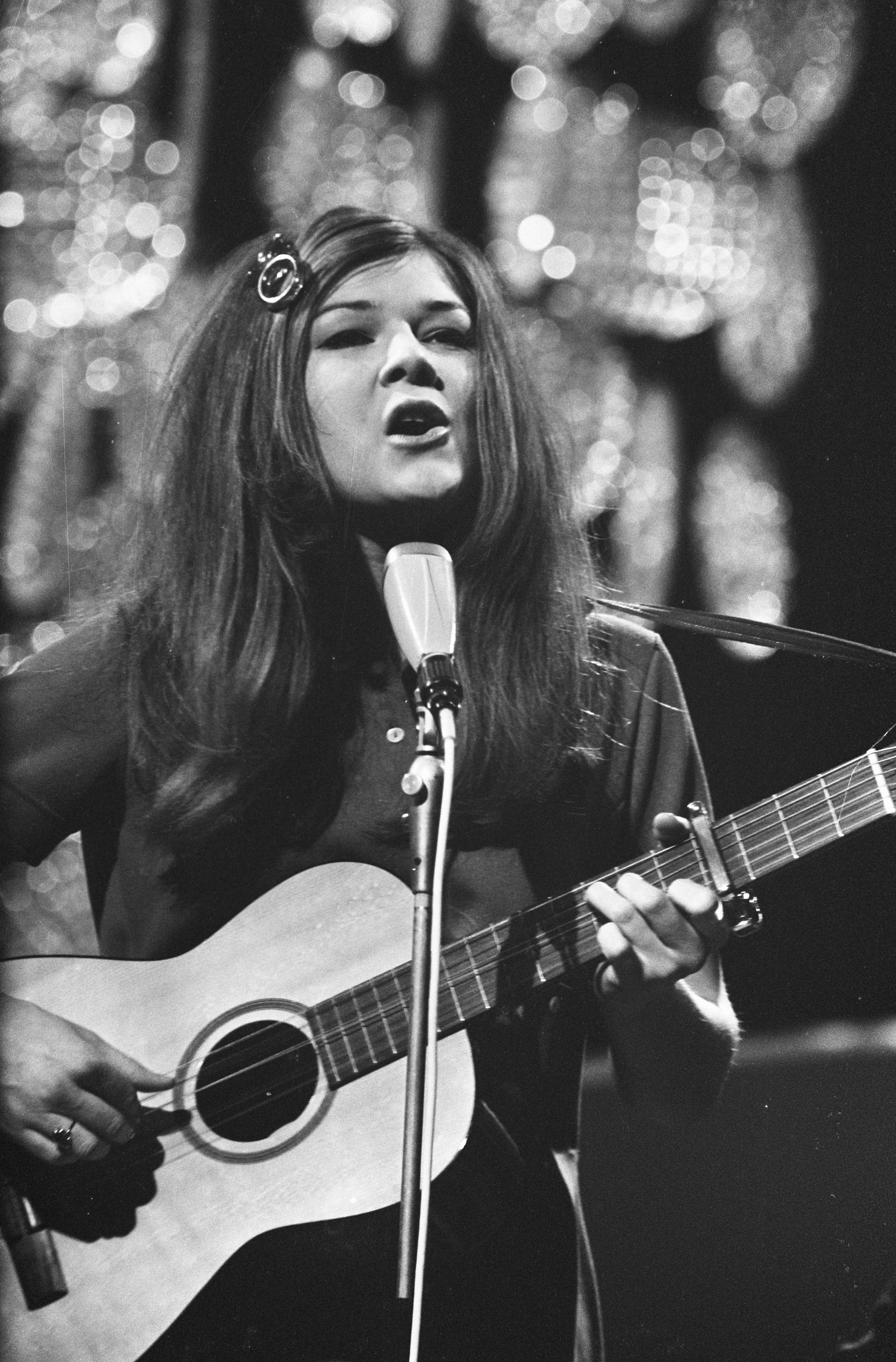
The Netherlands' Lenny Kuhr was one of four winners at the 1969 contest.

The Eurovision Song Contest 1969 was the fourteenth edition of the contest, organised by Televisión Española (TVE) and held on 29 March 1969 at the Teatro Real in Madrid, Spain. 16 countries entered this year's contest, with Austria refusing to take part due to the Spanish dictatorship. A tight voting sequence saw France, Spain, the Netherlands and the United Kingdom in contention for first place, when with the votes of the final jury, all four countries finished on an equal number of points. With no rules in place to break a tie for first place all four countries were declared victors, the only time that more than one country has won in a single year. As four medals had fortunately been struck for the prize-giving, Spain's Salomé, the UK's Lulu, the Netherlands' Lenny Kuhr and France's Frida Boccara were all able to receive their prize ahead of a reprise of all four winning songs: "Vivo cantando", "Boom Bang-a-Bang", "De troubadour", and "Un jour, un enfant" respectively. The result meant that France gained a new record fourth win in the contest, with the Netherlands recording its third win, and both Spain and the United Kingdom earning their second wins; Spain also became the first country to achieve two wins in a row.

== 1970s ==
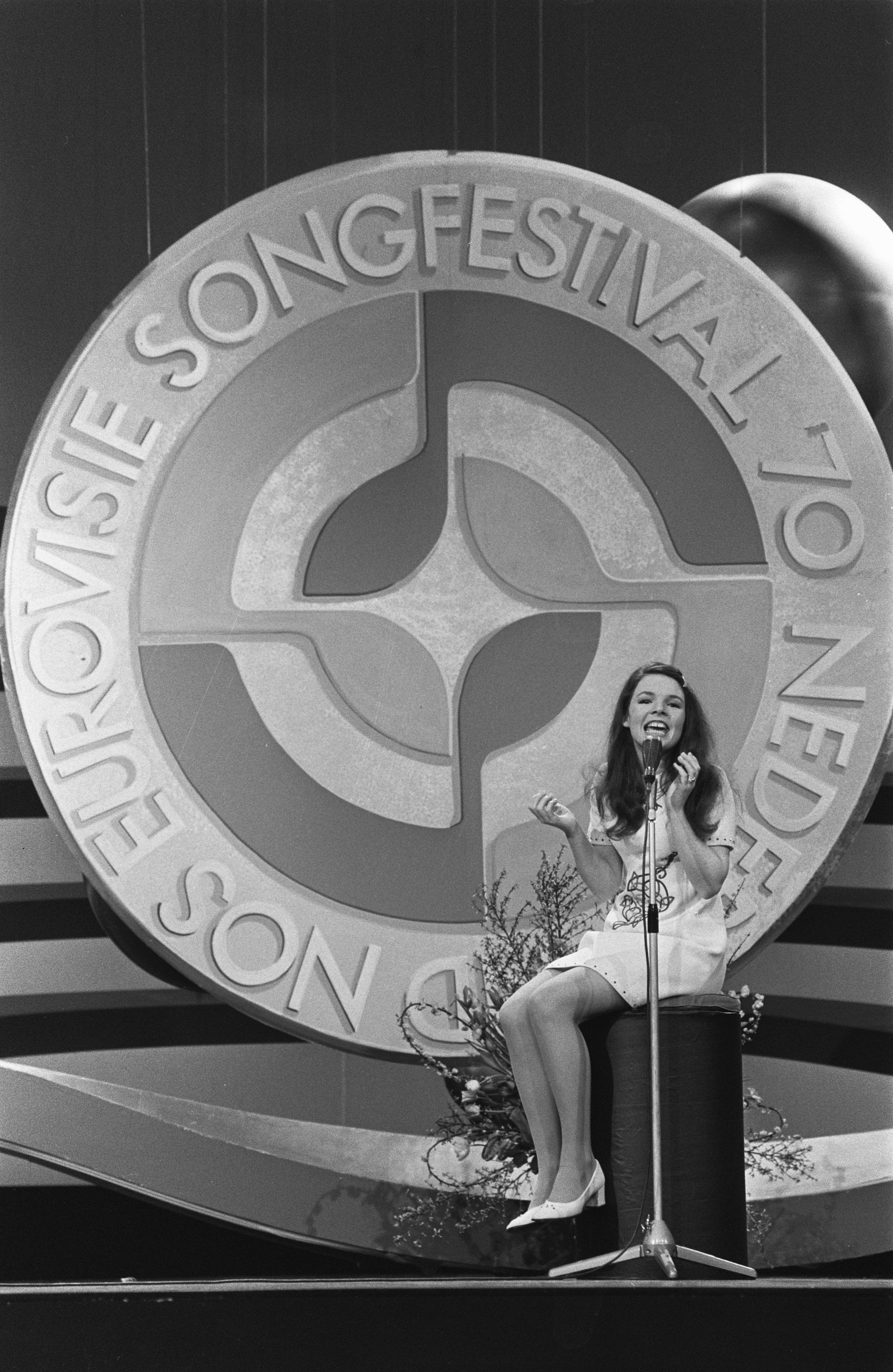
Dana became the first of seven Irish winners at the 1970 contest in Amsterdam.

The Eurovision Song Contest 1970 was the fifteenth edition of the contest, organised by Nederlandse Omroep Stichting (NOS) and held on 21 March 1970 at the RAI Congrescentrum in Amsterdam, Netherlands. A draw was held to determine the host country of this contest following the four-way tie for first place in 1969, which chose the Netherlands as hosts over France, as Spain and the United Kingdom declined to take part in the draw due to having hosted recent contests. Widespread dissatisfaction with the result of the 1969 contest led to the withdrawals of Finland, Norway, Sweden and Portugal, with Austria and Denmark also declining to participate in response, leaving only 12 countries to compete in Amsterdam, the lowest number of participants since 1959. A tie-break rule was introduced for the first time to ensure there would be no further joint winners: in the result of a tie for first place the artists of the countries involved would perform again, and the juries in all other remaining countries would determine the winner by a show of hands; if that too resulted in a tie then the countries would share the title. A number of innovations which have since become regular features of the contest were first implemented in this year, originally as a way to extend the broadcast due to the low number of participating entries. These include an extended opening film sequence highlighting the host country, and short film clip "postcards" highlighting the participants or host country which were placed between the competing songs. Ireland, which would go on to win more times than any other country, recorded its first win here, with Dana taking the contest with "All Kinds of Everything".

The Eurovision Song Contest 1971 was the sixteenth edition of the contest, organised by Radio Telefís Éireann (RTÉ) and held on 3 April 1971 at the Gaiety Theatre in Dublin, Ireland. 18 participants in total were present, the biggest contest since 1966, with Norway, Sweden, Finland, Austria and Portugal returning and Malta making its debut. Groups were allowed to participate for the first time, with the maximum number of performers allowed on stage set at six; previously only one or two principal vocalists had been permitted with support from a maximum of three supporting artists. A new voting system was also introduced for this contest, implemented to ensure that there would be a clear-cut winner and to avoid countries receiving nul points: two jurors from each country, one below the age of 25 and the other above, ranked all songs except that of their own country on a scale of one to five. Monaco recorded their first and only win, with French singer Séverine victorious for the principality with "Un banc, un arbre, une rue".

The Eurovision Song Contest 1972 was the seventeenth edition of the contest, organised by the BBC and held on 25 March 1972 at the Usher Hall in Edinburgh, United Kingdom. Monaco's Télé Monte-Carlo (TMC) had initially expressed interest in hosting, however no suitable venue in Monaco was available in time for the contest. After Spain's TVE and Germany's ARD, having come second and third the previous year, and France's ORTF had turned down the opportunity to host, the BBC offered once again to step in, taking the contest outside of London and England for the first time, to the Scottish capital. The same 18 countries from 1971 were again present, and the same voting system was implemented. The contest was broadcast in 28 countries, and for the first time was available live in Asia, with viewers able to watch the show in Japan, Taiwan, the Philippines, Hong Kong and Thailand. Luxembourg earned their third contest win, represented by the Greek singer Vicky Leandros with "Après toi"; it was Leandros' second attempt at Eurovision, having previously come 4th for Luxembourg in 1967.

The Eurovision Song Contest 1973 was the eighteenth edition of the contest, organised by CLT and held on 7 April 1973 at the Nouveau Théâtre in Luxembourg City, Luxembourg. Israel made its first appearance, becoming the first non-European nation to enter the contest, while Austria and Malta both withdrew, bringing the total participating nations to 17. Coming less than a year after the Munich massacre, security was unusually tight in light of Israel's debut, with the venue sealed off by the authorities and the Israeli delegation being isolated in their hotel and surrounded by armed guards when not required at the venue; the audience had also been warned not to stand during the show at the risk of being shot. This year marked the first abolition of the language rule, allowing participants the freedom to choose the language in which they wished to perform: several countries capitalised on this, with Finland and Sweden performing in English, while Norway performed in both English and French. Pre-recorded backing tracks were also permitted for the first time, however all vocals were still required to be performed live and any instruments featured on the track had to be seen on stage. Luxembourg won the contest for the second year in a row, with the French singer Anne-Marie David giving Luxembourg its fourth win with "Tu te reconnaîtras"; Luxembourg thus became the first country to win two outright back-to-back victories, Spain having won in both 1968 and 1969 but sharing the latter title.

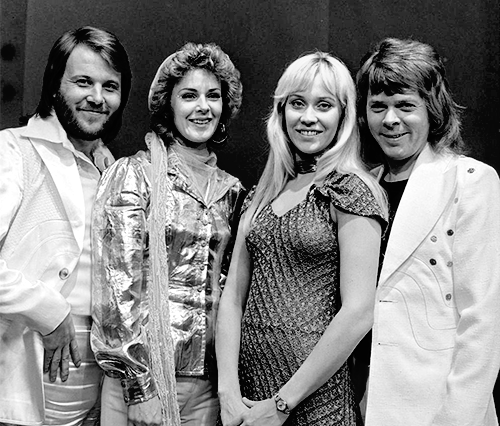
Sweden's ABBA went on to achieve worldwide fame following their Eurovision win in 1974.

The Eurovision Song Contest 1974 was the nineteenth edition of the contest, organised by the BBC and held on 6 April 1974 at The Dome in Brighton, United Kingdom. Luxembourg's CLT turned down the offer to host the contest for a second year in a row, and Spain's RTVE as runner-up in 1973 had also rejected hosting duties; an offer by Israel's IBA was turned down due to their limited technical capabilities, and in the end the BBC threw its hat into the ring once again to take on the contest for the fifth time. 17 countries competed in total, with Greece making its debut appearance; France withdrew a number of days before the event following the death of the President of France Georges Pompidou, in a mark of respect as his funeral was arranged for the day of the contest. The voting system was modified once again to bring back the system last used in 1970, with 10 jury members casting a single vote for their favourite song. Sweden's ABBA were declared the winners of the contest with "Waterloo", giving Sweden its first Eurovision title. ABBA's win in the contest would propel them to worldwide fame, with an estimated 380 million records sold across their career, with "Waterloo" alone selling five million copies and becoming one of the contest's most successful winning songs.

The Eurovision Song Contest 1975 was the twentieth edition of the contest, organised by Sveriges Radio (SR) and held on 22 March 1975 at the Stockholmsmässan in Stockholm, Sweden. A then-record 19 countries took part in this edition, which saw Greece withdrawing, France and Malta returning, and Turkey making its debut entry. SR had initially been hesitant in staging the contest due to the expense that came with it, and had wanted all competing countries to share the costs, however these cost sharing plans were not implemented in time for the '75 event. The Stockholm event also saw demonstrations by left-wing activists who opposed the high costs of hosting the event. A new voting system was introduced at this contest, which has been the basis for the rewarding of points at all future contests: each country's jury awarded 12 points to their top placed song, 10 points to their second placed, and then 8 to 1 points for those ranked third to tenth. The Netherlands was the first country to win the contest under this new system, with Teach-In achieving a fourth Dutch Eurovision win with "Ding-a-dong".

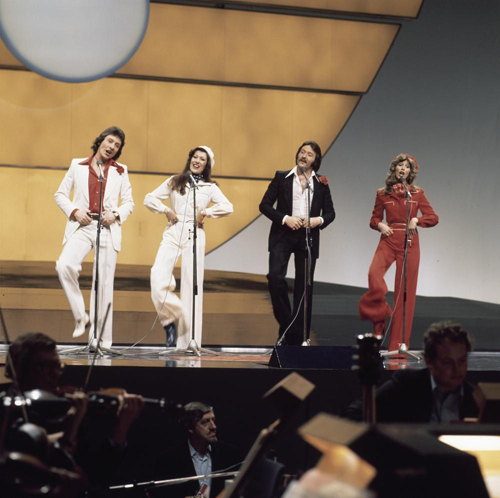
"Save Your Kisses for Me" by Brotherhood of Man would become the contest's most successful winning song, selling over six million copies worldwide.

The Eurovision Song Contest 1976 was the twenty-first edition of the contest, organised by NOS and held on 3 April 1976 at the Nederlands Congresgebouw in The Hague, Netherlands. The previous year's host Sweden, in response to the protests during the 1975 event and fearful of the costs involved in staging the event should they win again, decided to withdraw, joining Malta and Turkey, however with Austria and Greece returning a total of 18 countries took to the stage for the Netherlands' third contest as hosts. Partly in response to the concerns raised by the Swedish broadcaster, all competing countries were now required to contribute to the costs of running Eurovision, with the value of the contribution fee dependent on the country's viewership and population. The United Kingdom earned its third Eurovision victory, courtesy of Brotherhood of Man and "Save Your Kisses for Me", which would go on to sell over six million records worldwide, more than any other winning song in the history of the contest.

The Eurovision Song Contest 1977 was the twenty-second edition of the contest, organised by the BBC and held on 7 May 1977 at the Wembley Conference Centre in London, United Kingdom. Originally scheduled to take place on 2 April, a strike by BBC cameramen and technicians forced a five-week delay. The language rule was re-introduced at this contest, meaning that songs could only be performed in one of the national languages of the country it represented. 18 countries took part in the London contest, with Sweden returning and Yugoslavia withdrawing; an attempt was also made by Tunisia to take part in the contest for the first time, however this eventually did not materialise, despite being drawn to perform fourth on stage. France set a new record in recording its fifth Eurovision win, with Marie Myriam taking the contest with "L'Oiseau et l'Enfant", in what would become France's last victory to date.

The Eurovision Song Contest 1978 was the twenty-third edition of the contest, organised by TF1 and held on 22 April 1978 at the Palais des Congrès in Paris, France. A new record of 20 countries competed in France's third showing as host, with Denmark and Turkey returning, the former making its first appearance since 1966. Israel won the contest for the first time, represented by Izhar Cohen and the Alphabeta with the song "A-Ba-Ni-Bi". Israel's win proved problematic for a number of non-competing broadcasters who were airing the event, particularly those in the Arab world with limited recognition of Israel, and many broadcasters ended the transmission of the event early when it became clear that Israel would win.

The Eurovision Song Contest 1979 was the twenty-fourth edition of the contest, organised by the Israel Broadcasting Authority (IBA) and held on 31 March 1979 at the International Convention Centre in Jerusalem. 19 countries took part, with Turkey, who had initially intended to participate and had already selected their act, withdrawing at a late stage following pressure from Arab nations who objected to a predominantly Muslim nation taking part in Israel. A tight result saw Israel and Spain vie for first place, with Spain leading by only one point going into the final vote, which was Spain's own; by giving the hosts 10 points they awarded Israel its second victory in a row, handing the victory to Milk and Honey and the song "Hallelujah".

== 1980s ==
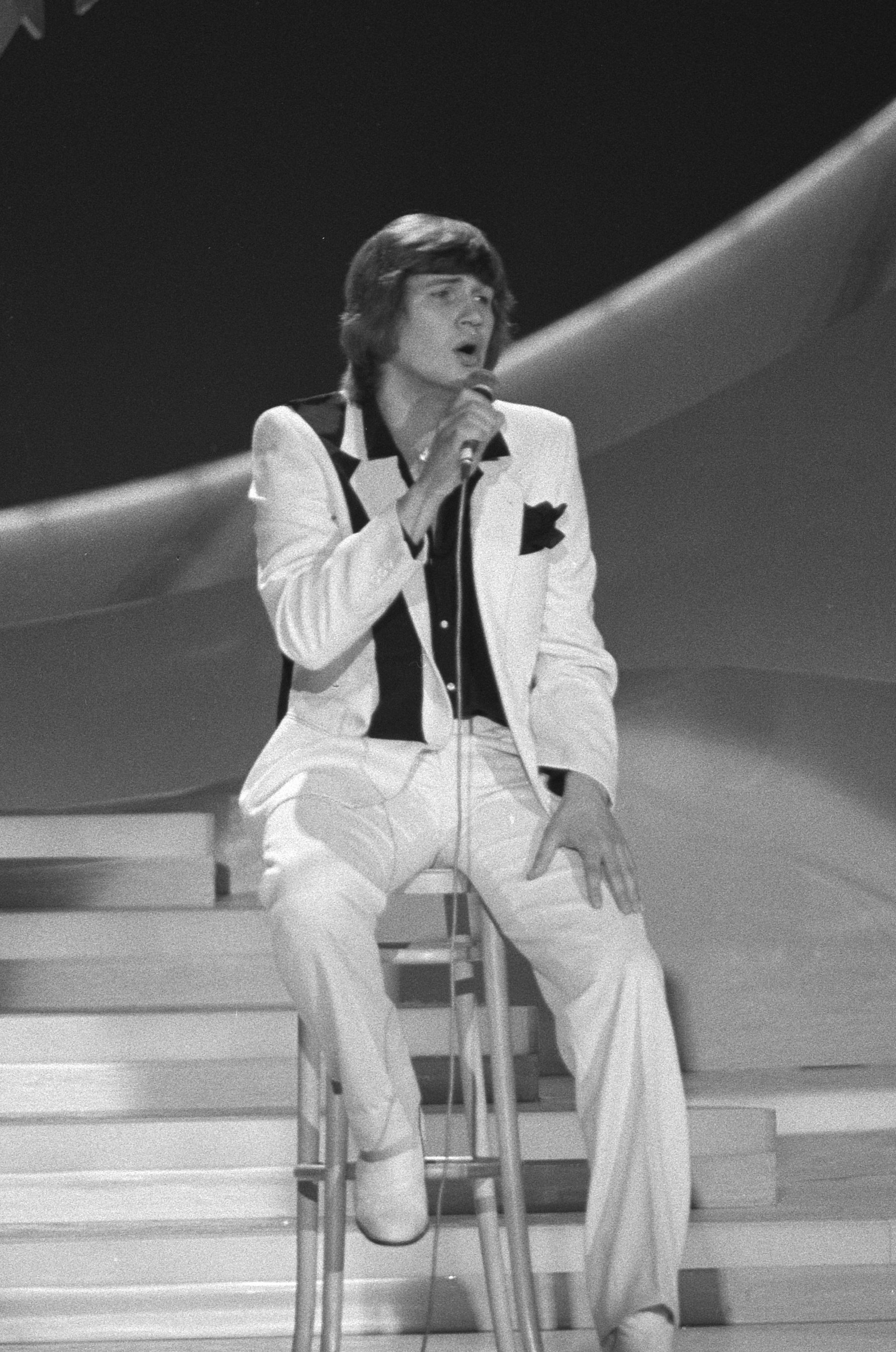
Ireland's Johnny Logan would go on to win the contest three times, picking up his first Eurovision win in 1980 in The Hague.

The Eurovision Song Contest 1980 was the twenty-fifth edition of the contest, organised by NOS and held on 19 April 1980 at the Nederlands Congresgebouw in The Hague, Netherlands. Israel, having won the previous year, had initially agreed to host the contest, however due to the cost of hosting the event for a second year in a row, IBA eventually declined to host the event. After a number of other broadcasters, including the BBC, appeared reluctant to stage the event, NOS stepped in on the understanding that they could host a scaled-back production, using the same venue as in 1976. The 19 April date proved problematic for Israel as it conflicted with Yom HaZikaron, and after failed attempts to move the date Israel ultimately pulled out, the first and only time that the previous year's winning country was unable to defend its title. Monaco also withdrew from the contest, however the number of competing countries remained steady at 19, with Turkey returning and Morocco making its debut entry, becoming the first African country to compete in the contest. Johnny Logan recorded the first of his three Eurovision wins in The Hague, giving Ireland its second victory with the song "What's Another Year".

The Eurovision Song Contest 1981 was the twenty-sixth edition of the contest, organised by RTÉ and held on 4 April 1981 at the RDS Simmonscourt in Dublin, Ireland. 20 countries competed in total, with Cyprus making its debut appearance, Israel and Yugoslavia returning, and Morocco and Italy withdrawing, the latter for the first time since the contest was formed. A worldwide audience of around 500 million viewers was expected, with some 30 countries taking the broadcast across Europe, Asia and North Africa. The voting came down to a close contest between Switzerland, the United Kingdom and Germany, and the UK gained its fourth victory by a 4-point margin over Germany. Bucks Fizz, specially formed for the contest, would have great success in the following years, and their Eurovision winning song "Making Your Mind Up" would go on to become a Europe-wide hit.

The Eurovision Song Contest 1982 was the twenty-seventh edition of the contest, organised by the BBC and held on 24 April 1982 at the Harrogate Convention Centre in Harrogate, United Kingdom. 18 countries competed in total, with France and Greece withdrawing. French broadcaster TF1 in withdrawing criticised the contest's musical quality and describing it as a "monument to drivel", where as Greece, which would have performed second on the night, was forced to pull out a few weeks before the contest when it was discovered that its intended entry had been previously released and based on a Greek folk song. Germany dominated the voting and would win with the biggest margin yet seen under the current system (61 points), as well as gaining a new record number of 12 points, with 9 juries placing them top. Nicole became the first German act to win the contest, 26 years after their first entry, and during the winning reprise would perform her winning entry "Ein bißchen Frieden" in English, French, Dutch and the original German.

The Eurovision Song Contest 1983 was the twenty-eighth edition of the contest, organised by Bayerischer Rundfunk (BR) on behalf of ARD and held on 23 April 1983 at the Rudi-Sedlmayer-Halle in Munich, West Germany. 20 countries were present at Germany's second contest has hosts, with returns from Italy, Greece and France, with the latter represented by a new broadcaster, Antenne 2, following a public outcry over the previous year's absence, however Ireland withdrew for the first time due to a financial crisis at broadcaster RTÉ. Luxembourg recorded its fifth outright win after a close vote over Israel, Sweden and Yugoslavia, with the French singer Corinne Hermès cementing the Grand Duchy as one of the contest's most successful countries with "Si la vie est cadeau".

The Eurovision Song Contest 1984 was the twenty-ninth edition of the contest, organised by RTL and held on 5 May 1984 at the Théâtre Municipal in Luxembourg City, Luxembourg. 19 countries in total took part, with Ireland returning and Israel declining to participate as the date of the contest clashed with Yom HaZikaron, with Greece also withdrawing at a late stage after broadcaster ERT decided that their potential songs were too low quality for the event. Désirée Nosbusch, chosen as the hostess for the event, became the youngest person to compère the contest, at only 19 years old. 10 years after ABBA had earned Sweden its first Eurovision win, Herreys gave the Scandinavian country its second, taking the contest with "Diggi-Loo Diggi-Ley".

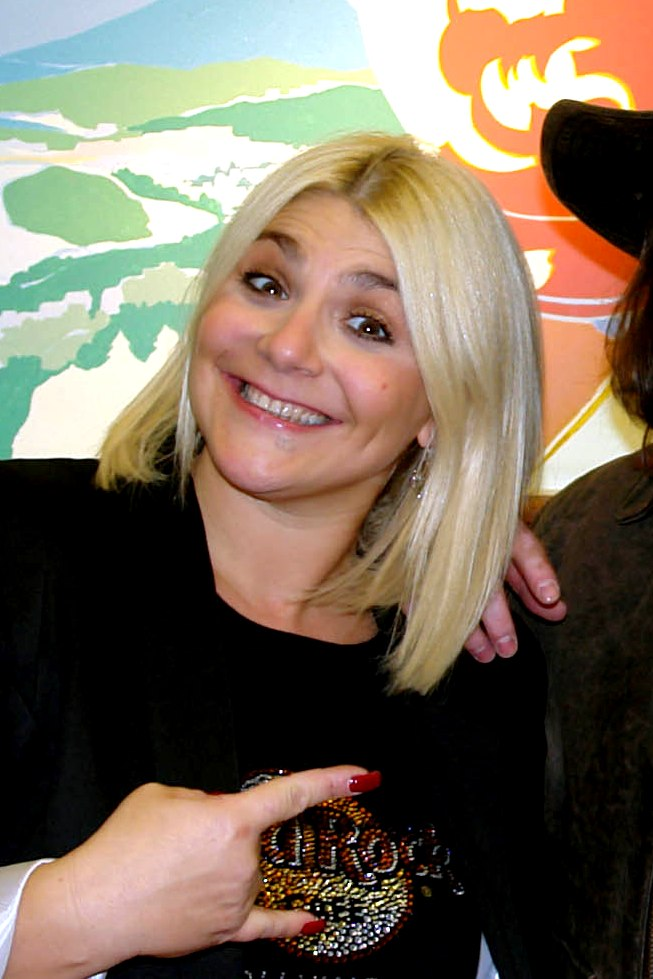
Sandra Kim (pictured in 2012) became the contest's youngest winner in 1986, at 13 years old.

The Eurovision Song Contest 1985 was the thirtieth edition of the contest, organised by Sveriges Television (SVT) and held on 4 May 1985 at the Scandinavium in Gothenburg, Sweden. With over 8,000 spectators present in the arena, the 1985 event was the largest yet held, and was the first contest to be broadcast live via satellite. 19 countries were again present, with Israel and Greece returning but Yugoslavia and the Netherlands withdrawing, the latter for the first time; in both cases the contest clashed with national memorial days, with the Remembrance of the Dead held in the Netherlands and in Yugoslavia the anniversary of the death of President Josip Broz Tito. A close-fought contest in the voting between Norway, Germany and Sweden saw the perennial losers victorious for the first time: Norway had previously come last on six occasion, more than any other country, leading to great celebrations in the arena when Bobbysocks! were crowned the winners with "La det swinge".

The Eurovision Song Contest 1986 was the thirty-first edition of the contest, organised by Norsk rikskringkasting (NRK) and held on 3 May 1986 at the Grieghallen in Bergen, Norway. 20 countries competed in total: the Netherlands and Yugoslavia returned after a year's absence and Iceland made its debut appearance. Italy had decided to opt-out of this year's event, while Greece withdrew at a late stage due to the contest coinciding with Holy Saturday. In a landmark event the 500th song to grace the Eurovision stage was performed at this contest, courtesy of Luxembourg's Sherisse Laurence and "L'Amour de ma vie". This contest also saw one of the first open representations of a member of the LGBT community, when members of the Norwegian drag group the Great Garlic Girls accompanied the home nation's singer Ketil Stokkan. Belgium scored its first and only victory to date, with Sandra Kim becoming the contest's youngest ever winner, at only 13 years old, with the song "J'aime la vie"; Kim had previously told producers before the contest that she was 15 years old, and when the truth was revealed the Swiss delegation, who had come second, protested and petitioned for Belgium to be disqualified to no avail.

The Eurovision Song Contest 1987 was the thirty-second edition of the contest, organised by Radio-télévision belge de la Communauté française (RTBF) and held on 9 May 1987 at the Palais de Centenaire in Brussels, Belgium. Belgium had at that point waited longer than any other country to host its first contest, 31 years after their debut entry. Since the contest's formation two broadcasters had been responsible for choosing Belgium's entries, with French-language RTBF and Dutch-language Belgische Radio- en Televisieomroep (BRT) alternating every other year. Initially BRT had wanted to co-produce the first Belgian contest with RTBF, the broadcaster which had won the previous year, however disagreements quickly arose between the two organisations, and so RTBF organised the contest on its own, with BRT selecting the Belgian entry. 22 countries entered the contest, a new record, with Italy and Greece making a return and joining the 20 countries from the previous year. Johnny Logan, the winner of the 1980 contest, returned for Ireland and became the first artist to record two wins in the contest with "Hold Me Now", and in doing so giving Ireland its third contest win.

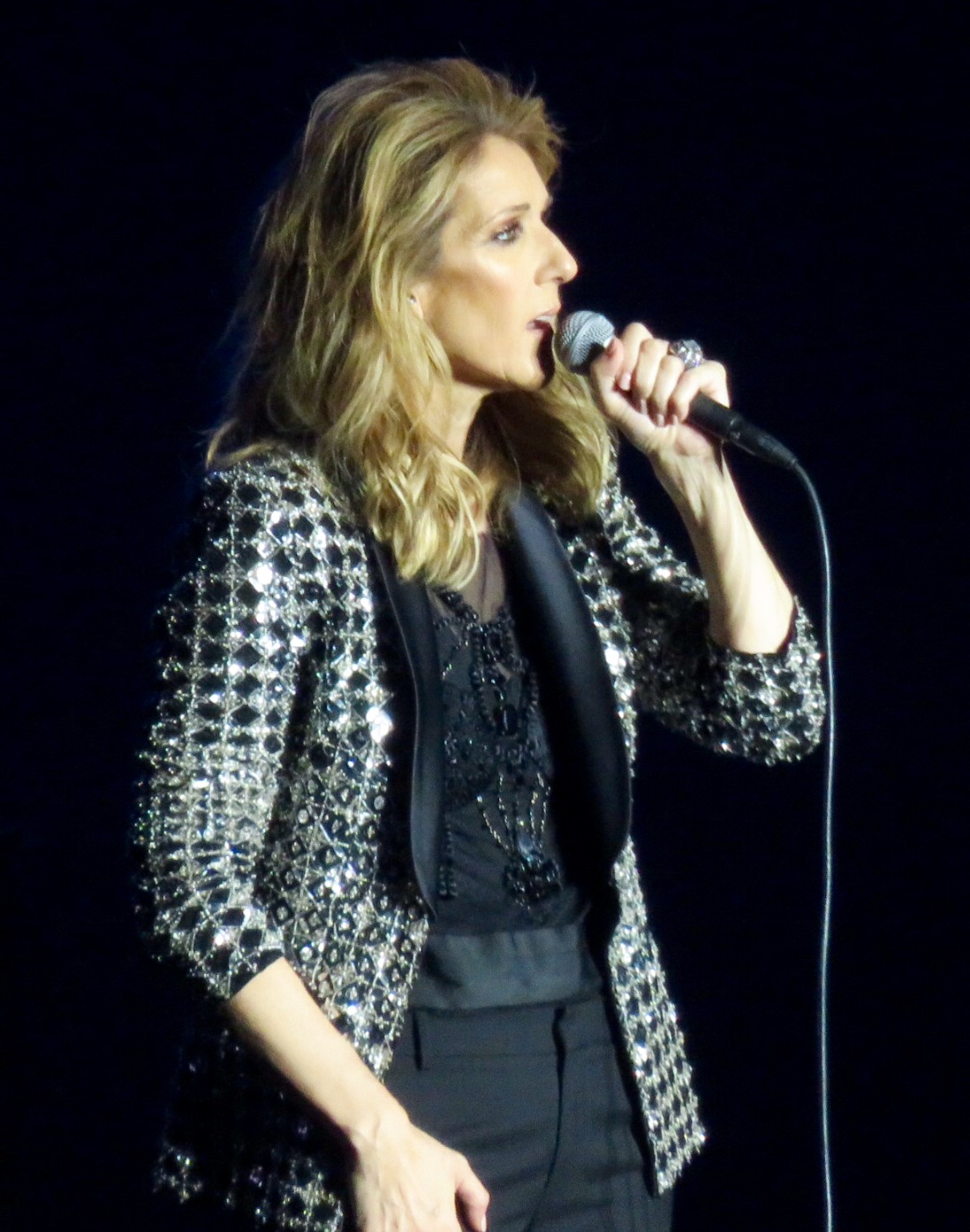
Céline Dion, one of the world's best-selling artists, was still relatively unknown outside of her native Canada when she won the 1988 contest for Switzerland.

The Eurovision Song Contest 1988 was the thirty-third edition of the contest, organised by RTÉ and held on 30 April 1988 at the RDS Simmonscourt in Dublin, Ireland. This was Ireland's third contest, which fell in the same year as the millennium of Dublin's founding. The same group of countries from 1987 entered, however Cyprus was forced to withdraw at a late stage when it was discovered that their entry had previously competed in the Cypriot national selection in 1984. The RTÉ production team made a great effort to modernise the contest and attract a younger audience, with a modern stage commissioned, the largest yet seen, which featured two giant video walls, and the first ever use of a computerised scoreboard. In one of the closest contests yet seen, Switzerland emerged victorious by only a single point over the United Kingdom, with a then-unknown Céline Dion earning Switzerland its second victory with "Ne partez pas sans moi". Although her Eurovision-winning song was not commercially successful, Dion would later become one of the world's best-selling artists, having sold over 200 million records throughout her career.

The Eurovision Song Contest 1989 was the thirty-fourth edition of the contest, organised by Télévision suisse romande (TSR) on behalf of SRG SSR and held on 6 May 1989 at the Palais de Beaulieu in Lausanne, Switzerland. This marked the second Eurovision to be held in Switzerland, 33 years after the inaugural contest was held in the Alpine country. With Cyprus returning, the final contest of the 1980s equalled the record of 22 competing countries set in 1987. A modification to the tie-break rule was implemented this year: a count-back would now occur for the countries which were tied for first place, with the country with the most 12 points being declared the winner, with further comparisons against 10 points and lower also conducted if required to break the tie. Two of the competing acts created controversy in the run-up to the contest due to their young age, with France's Nathalie Pâque and Israel's Gili Netanel becoming the youngest ever participants in contest history at 11 and 12 years old respectively. Yugoslavia recorded their only win in the contest, when Riva took victory with "Rock Me".

== 1990s ==
The Eurovision Song Contest 1990 was the thirty-fifth edition of the contest, organised by Radiotelevizija Zagreb (RTZ) on behalf of Jugoslovenska radio-televizija (JRT) and held on 5 May 1990 at the Vatroslav Lisinski Concert Hall in Zagreb, Yugoslavia. In response to the Israeli and French singers in 1989, the EBU introduced a new age rule, barring anyone below the age of 16 on the day of the contest from competing; this rule means that Sandra Kim, the contest's youngest winner at 13 years old, remains so in perpetuity. Italy's Toto Cutugno became the first winner of the decade, giving Italy its second win with Insieme: 1992, an ode to the planned formation of the European Union in 1992.

The Eurovision Song Contest 1991 was the thirty-sixth edition of the contest, organised by RAI and held on 4 May 1991 at Studio 15 di Cinecittà in Rome, Italy. This was the second edition of the contest to be held in Italy, and was presented by the two previous Italian winners, Gigliola Cinquetti and Toto Cutugno. The contest was originally planned to be held in Sanremo, the site of the Sanremo Music Festival which was the inspiration for Eurovision, however following the outbreak of the Gulf War, RAI decided to move the contest to the Italian capital to better ensure the security of the foreign delegations. The Netherlands once again withdrew as the contest fell on the Remembrance of the Dead memorial, but Malta made its first appearance in the contest since 1975, keeping the contest participants at 22; Germany also made its first appearance as a unified country following German reunification in October 1990. The closest ever final result was recorded, with Sweden and France both finishing with the same number of points; Sweden was subsequently declared the winner when, in the only ever use of the tie-break rule in contest history, a count-back revealed that Sweden had collected more 10 points than France, after both countries had collected the same number of 12 points. Carola therefore became the third Swedish act to win the contest with "Fångad av en stormvind" in her second participation in the contest, having previously come third in 1983.

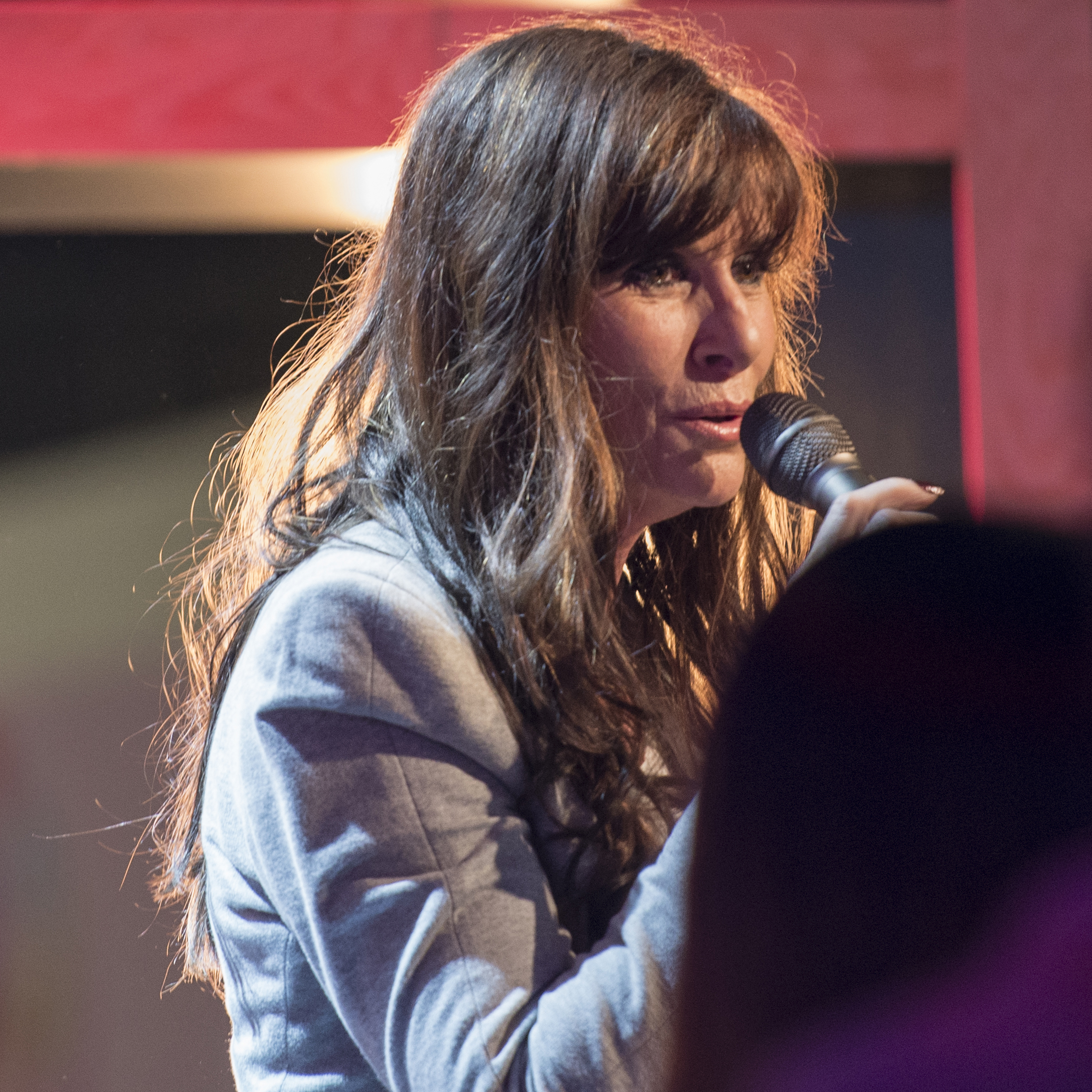
In winning the 1992 contest, Linda Martin was the first of three Irish artists in a row to win Eurovision in the early 1990s.

The Eurovision Song Contest 1992 was the thirty-seventh edition of the contest, organised by SVT and held on 9 May 1992 at the Malmö Isstadion in Malmö, Sweden. A new record 23 countries entered the contest, with the Netherlands making its return. This contest would mark the last appearance of Yugoslavia, having already begun the process of breaking up and now representing the Federal Republic of Yugoslavia. Ireland's Linda Martin emerged the winner with the Johnny Logan-penned "Why Me?", giving Ireland its fourth win and Logan his third as both performer and songwriter; it was Martin's second contest appearance, having previously come second for Ireland in 1984. With the United Kingdom and Malta taking second and third, this was the first contest to have solely English-language songs feature in the top 3.

The Eurovision Song Contest 1993 was the thirty-eighth edition of the contest, organised by RTÉ and held on 15 May 1993 at the Green Glens Arena in Millstreet, Ireland. It remains the only Irish production of the contest to be held outside of Dublin and, as a small town of only 1,500 people, Millstreet became the smallest Eurovision host to date, although the Green Glens Arena was able to hold up to 8,000 spectators. Changes in Europe in the 1990s were first reflected at this contest, with several new countries formed following the dissolution of the Soviet Union and breakup of Yugoslavia wishing to compete for the first time. In order to accommodate this growing number, the first Eurovision pre-selection took place in Ljubljana, Slovenia on 3 April, Kvalifikacija za Millstreet; seven countries competed for three places at the contest, with the former Yugoslav states Slovenia, Bosnia and Herzegovina and Croatia emerging the winners and joining 22 countries which had taken part in Malmö, with only Yugoslavia absent, banned from competing following UN sanctions. In order to better manage the participating countries in years to come, a relegation system was introduced, which saw the bottom-placed countries missing out the following year and replaced by new and returning countries. A two-horse race soon developed in the voting between the United Kingdom and Ireland, with the final jury crucial in giving victory to the hosts: Niamh Kavanagh became the first Irish act to win on home soil with "In Your Eyes", their second consecutive win and a record-equalling fifth win in total.

The Eurovision Song Contest 1994 was the thirty-ninth edition of the contest, organised by RTÉ and held on 30 April 1994 at the Point Theatre in Dublin, Ireland. RTÉ thus became the first broadcaster to host two consecutive contests. Seven countries joined the contest for the first time, replacing the bottom six countries from Millstreet, and Italy which withdrew voluntarily; Luxembourg, one of those countries relegated, subsequently failed to return the following year, and their 1993 entry would remain their last for 31 years. Estonia, Hungary, Romania and Slovakia, which had failed to qualify from Kvalifikacija za Millstreet the previous year, joined new entries from Lithuania, Poland and Russia in debuting, competing alongside the top 18 countries from Millstreet. Riverdance, which would go on to become one of the world's most successful dance productions, made its debut in this edition as the interval act; originally a seven-minute performance, it would later be expanded into a full show which would go on to be performed at over 450 venues worldwide and be seen by over 250 million people. Satellite links were used during the voting at this contest, which enabled the jury spokespersons to be seen in vision for the first time. Ireland secured its third consecutive win, a feat yet to be replicated, and earned a record-breaking sixth win courtesy of Paul Harrington and Charlie McGettigan and "Rock 'n' Roll Kids"; Poland secured the best-ever showing yet seen for a debut country, when Edyta Górniak placed second.

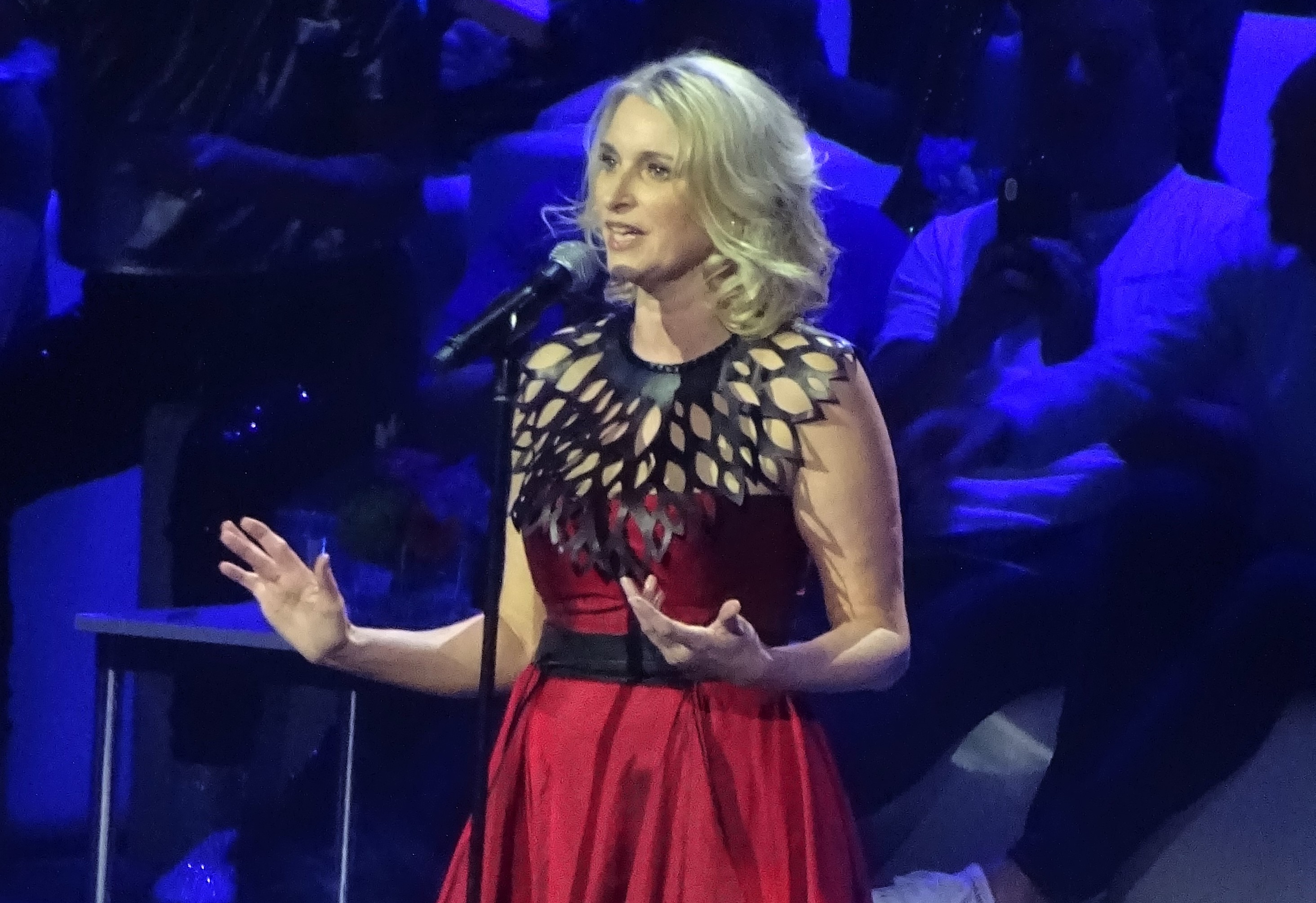
Eimear Quinn became the seventh artist to win the contest for Ireland in 1996, which remains a record to this day.

The Eurovision Song Contest 1995 was the fortieth edition of the contest, organised by RTÉ and held on 13 May 1995 at the Point Theatre in Dublin, Ireland. RTÉ had concerns about staging the contest for a third consecutive year, and the BBC submitted an offer to take on the event, as well as proposing a joint production in Belfast, the capital of Northern Ireland; ultimately RTÉ decided to produce the contest solo, hosting its third consecutive contest, which remains a record, with the Point Theatre becoming the first venue to host two contests in a row. The number of competing countries was reduced to 23, with the bottom seven countries from 1994 relegated and the five countries relegated at Millstreet in 1993 returning. Norway scored its second contest victory with the Irish-Norwegian duo Secret Garden and the song "Nocturne"; some criticism arose following its victory that, as a mainly instrumental number containing only 24 words in total, the winning song should not have been eligible for the song contest, to no avail.

The Eurovision Song Contest 1996 was the forty-first edition of the contest, organised by NRK and held on 18 May 1996 at the Oslo Spektrum in Oslo, Norway. A new qualifying system was introduced at this contest, principally to appease Germany, one of the contest's biggest financial backers, which otherwise would have been relegated, which saw all countries, except the host nation, competing in an audio-only qualifying round. 29 countries submitted entries for this qualifying round, with all competing nations and Norway voting and deciding the 22 countries which would advance to the final and join Norway as the host country and previous year's winner. Germany however would be one of the seven countries to be eliminated, along with Hungary, Denmark, Russia, Israel, Romania and the former Yugoslav Republic of Macedonia, in what would have been their debut entry. For the first and only time to date, the voting was conducted using virtual reality technology, with the graphics for the scoreboard superimposed over the contest's 'blue room'. Ireland secured its record seventh win, with Eimear Quinn providing its fourth win in five years with "The Voice". As in previous contests the most commercially successful contest entry would be one of the losing songs, with the UK's "Ooh Aah... Just a Little Bit" by Gina G becoming an international hit, reaching the top 20 of the US Billboard Hot 100 and eventually being nominated for a Grammy Award; it also remains the last UK entry to reach number one on the UK Singles Chart.

The Eurovision Song Contest 1997 was the forty-second edition of the contest, organised by RTÉ and held on 3 May 1997 at the Point Theatre in Dublin, Ireland. 25 countries competed in the third contest held at the Point Theatre, with a new relegation system implemented to reduce the number of competing entries: the number of points each country earned in the last four contests was used to calculate an average score for each country, and the countries with the lowest average were made to sit out for a year. Israel withdrew voluntarily due to the contest conflicting with Yom HaShoah, giving a reprieve to Bosnia and Herzegovina which would have otherwise been relegated; Italy also made a brief return after a four-year absence, in what would be their last entry for fourteen years. The first use of televoting was implemented at this contest on a trial basis, with the points from Austria, Switzerland, Germany, Sweden and the United Kingdom being determined by the viewing public rather than an assembled jury. Full backing tracks were also now permitted without restriction, allowing songs to be performed without live music if desired, although live vocals were still required. The United Kingdom emerged victorious for the fifth time, 16 years after their last win, with Katrina and the Waves and "Love Shine a Light".

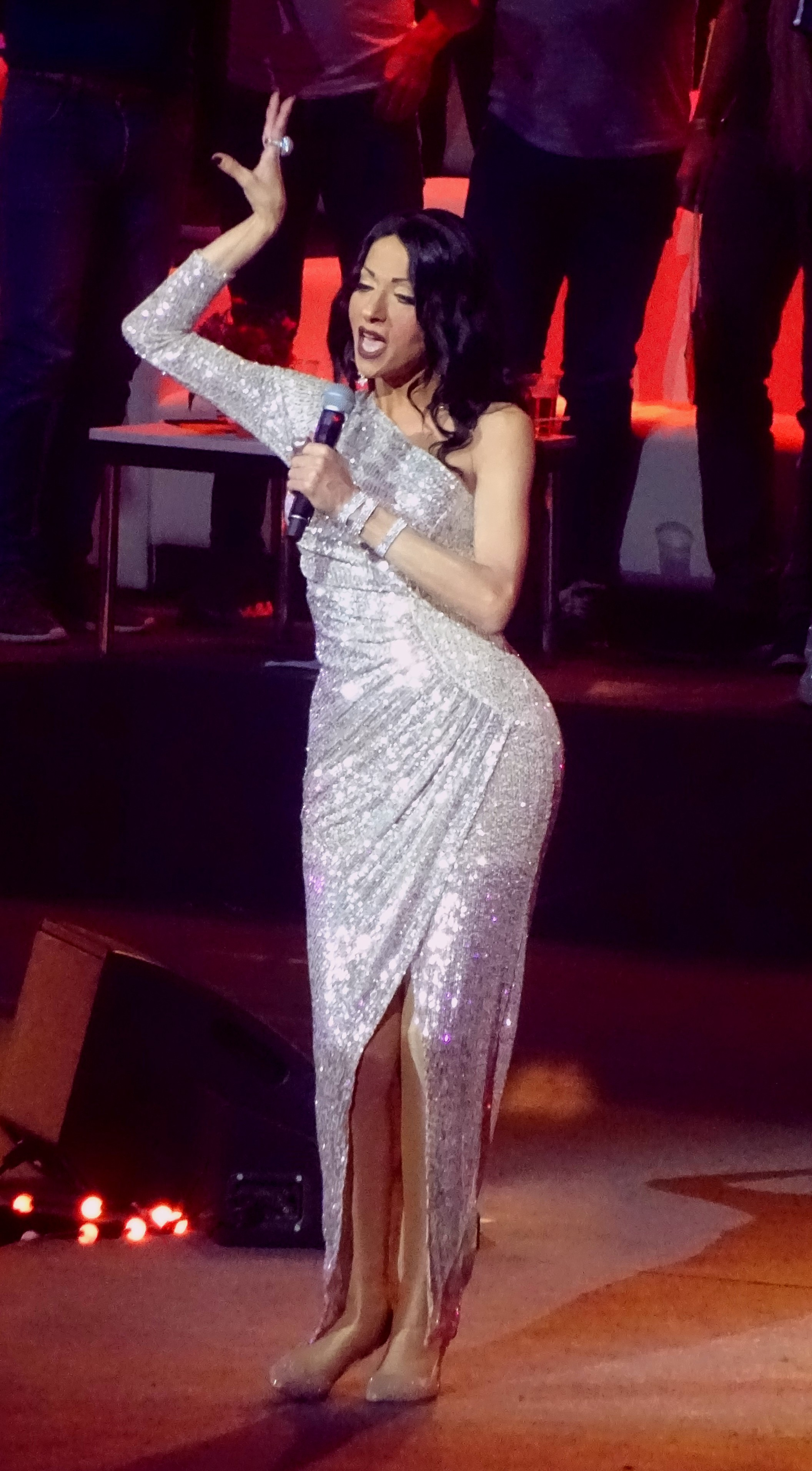
Israel's Dana International became the contest's first trans and LGBT performer to win the contest in 1998.

The Eurovision Song Contest 1998 was the forty-third edition of the contest, organised by the BBC and held on 9 May 1998 at the National Indoor Arena in Birmingham, United Kingdom. 25 countries were featured in the eighth contest held in the UK, a new record, with Macedonia making its debut appearance. Following the successful trial in 1997 televoting took place in the majority of countries for the first time at this contest. The first result widely determined by the viewing public saw Israel, the UK and Malta vie for first place, with Israel's Dana International declared victorious with the final result, giving Israel its third win with "Diva". Dana International, the contest's first trans performer, had emerged a controversial figure in Israel following her selection for the contest, with criticism being levied by conservative sections of Israeli society and death threats being received from fanatical factions.

The Eurovision Song Contest 1999 was the forty-fourth edition of the contest, organised by IBA and held on 29 May 1999 at the International Convention Centre in Jerusalem, Israel. 23 countries took part in Israel's second contest as hosts, with Lithuania returning after a 5-year absence. It was the first contest not to feature an orchestra, which had become an optional requirement this year, a change which IBA had utilised in an effort to cut costs. This change, which proved controversial, meant that all entries would be accompanied by a backing track for the first time, a decision which former winner Johnny Logan claimed had turned the contest into "karaoke". The language rule was also relaxed once again, which allowed artists the option to perform in any language, with many now choosing to sing in English. The "Big Four" group of countries was formed at this contest, a rule which saw the contest's largest financial backers, Germany, France, Spain and the United Kingdom, now being exempt from relegation and able to participate every year. The contest became a close race between Sweden and Iceland, with Charlotte Nilsson earning Sweden's fourth contest win with "Take Me to Your Heaven". Following the winning reprise the broadcast was concluded by all participating artists assembling on-stage to perform "Hallelujah", the Israeli winning song from 1979, as a tribute to the victims of the then-ongoing war in the Balkans.

== 2000s ==
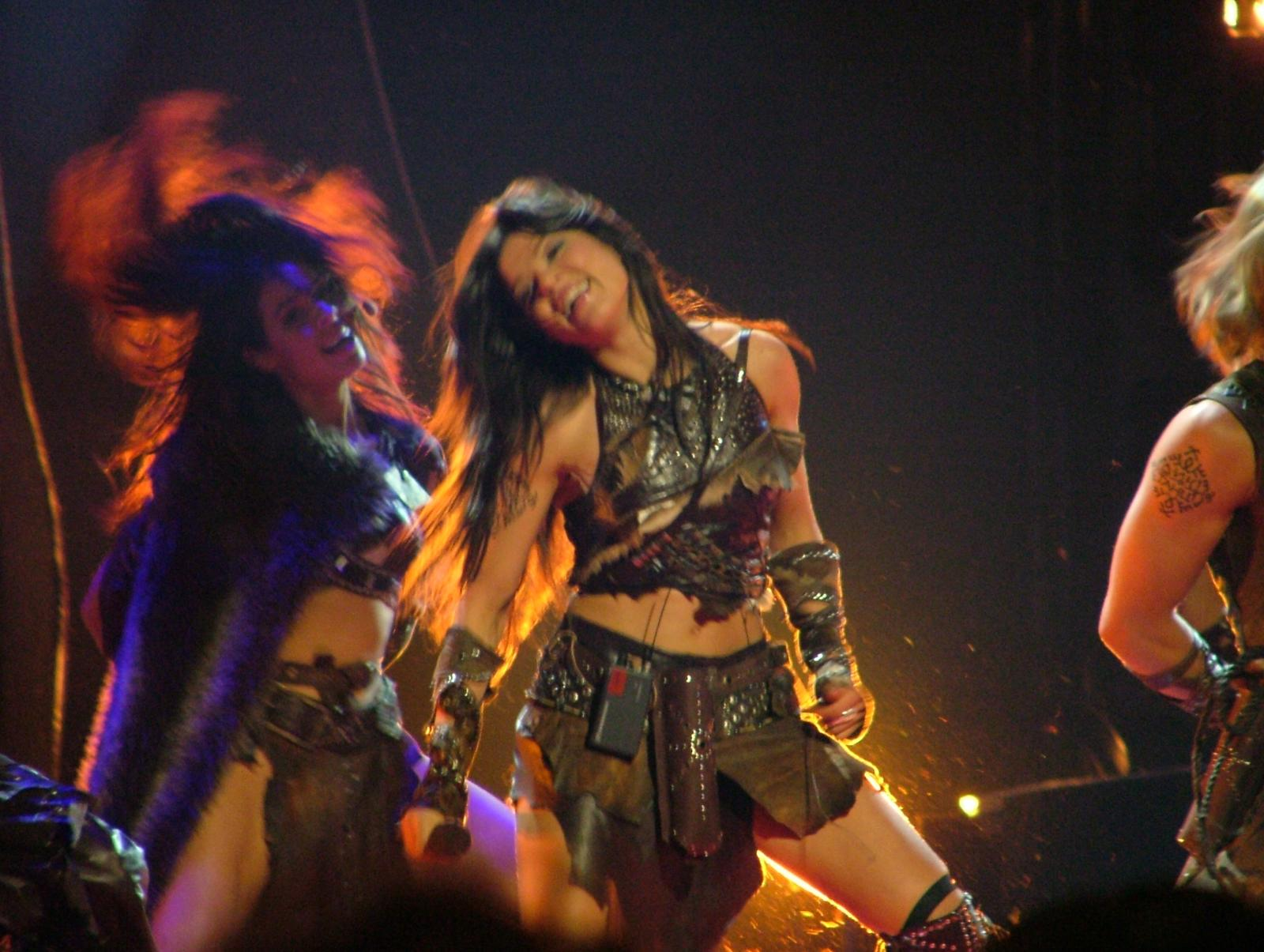
Ruslana earned Ukraine its first victory on only its second contest appearance in 2004.

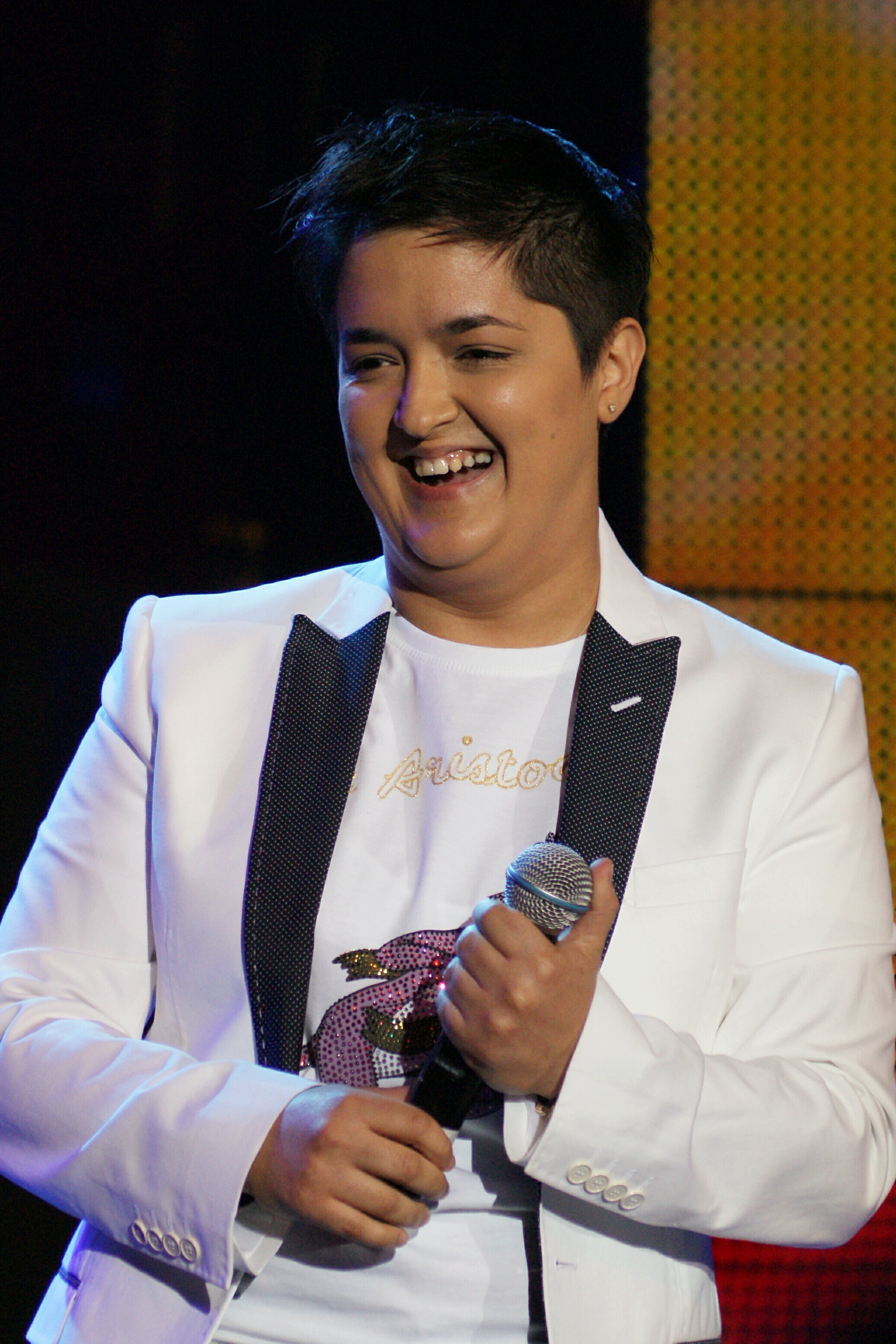
Serbia became only the second country to win on its debut appearance, when Marija Šerifović was victorious in 2007.

The Eurovision Song Contest 2000 was the forty-fifth edition of the contest, organised by SVT and held on 13 May 2000 at the Globe Arena in Stockholm, Sweden. 24 countries competed in the contest, with Latvia making its first appearance. The first contest of the new millennium was held before the biggest crowd yet seen in its history, with over 13,000 spectators witnessing the show in the arena, and it was the first contest to be broadcast live via the internet. Denmark secured its second win, its first since 1963, represented by the Olsen Brothers with the song "Fly on the Wings of Love". Russia, which had placed second, petitioned for the song's disqualification for the partial use of a vocoder, which was rejected by the EBU.

The Eurovision Song Contest 2001 was the forty-sixth edition of the contest, organised by DR and held on 12 May 2001 at the Parken Stadium in Copenhagen, Denmark. A retractable roof was specially constructed over the football stadium for the contest, and with 38,000 spectators it became the biggest live audience ever seen at Eurovision, a record which still stands. 23 countries competed in total, and the relegation system was again altered, by removing the average score comparison and bringing back the system used in 1994 and 1995 of relegating the bottom-placed countries, with the Big Four being exempt no matter their placing. Estonia was declared the winner, represented by Tanel Padar, Dave Benton and 2XL with "Everybody". With its victory, Estonia became the first country from the former Eastern Bloc to win the contest, sparking an eight-year chain of victories for new countries, and Aruba-born Benton became the first black artist to win the contest.

The Eurovision Song Contest 2002 was the forty-seventh edition of the contest, organised by Eesti Televisioon (ETV) and held on 25 May 2002 at the Saku Suurhall in Tallinn, Estonia. 24 countries participated in the first contest to be held behind the former Iron Curtain. The Marcel Bezençon Awards, a series of additional prizes honouring some of the best songs and artists in each contest's final as voted for by the accredited press, commentators and composers, were first awarded at this contest and have been subsequently featured at every contest since, traditionally handed out backstage shortly before the grand final. Latvia earned its first title, only two years after their first entry, represented by Marie N and "I Wanna". Latvia had originally been relegated due to its poor performance in Copenhagen, but was given a reprieve when Portugal decided to withdraw voluntarily.

The Eurovision Song Contest 2003 was the forty-eighth edition of the contest, organised by Latvian Television (LTV) and held on 24 May 2003 at the Skonto Hall in Riga, Latvia. 26 countries took part in the contest, with Ukraine joining the contest for the first time. This would become the last contest to be held over a single evening, with an announcement in January 2003 that from 2004 a semi-final would be introduced: the top 10 countries from the 2003 event alongside the "Big Four" would qualify automatically for the final in 2004, with all other countries competing in the semi-final for 10 qualification places. Turkey gained its first Eurovision win, with Sertab Erener victorious in one of the closest contests ever seen, as "Everyway That I Can" triumphed with only three points separating the top three countries.

The Eurovision Song Contest 2004 was the forty-ninth edition of the contest, organised by the Turkish Radio and Television Corporation (TRT) and held on 12 and 15 May 2004 at the Abdi İpekçi Arena in Istanbul, Turkey. A record 36 countries competed in the first contest held under the new format, with the relegated countries from 2003 being joined by Albania, Andorra, Belarus and Serbia and Montenegro in their debut appearances, with Monaco also making its first appearance after a 25-year absence. 22 countries entered the first Eurovision semi-final, with the top 10 joining the 14 automatic qualifiers in the final. Ukraine emerged the winner, in only their second contest appearance, represented by Ruslana and "Wild Dances".

The Eurovision Song Contest 2005 was the fiftieth edition of the contest, organised by the National Television Company of Ukraine (NTU) and held on 19 and 21 May 2005 at the Palace of Sports in Kyiv, Ukraine. 39 countries competed in total, with debut entries from Moldova and Bulgaria, and a return from Hungary for the first time since 1998. Lebanon had also planned to make a debut appearance, however they withdrew at a late stage due to issues with competing alongside Israel. Greece's Helena Paparizou became the winner of the anniversary edition of the contest with "My Number One", the first win for Greece after 31 years of competition.

On 22 October 2005, a special competition was held to celebrate the contest's 50th anniversary. Congratulations: 50 Years of the Eurovision Song Contest was organised by DR and held at the Forum Copenhagen in Copenhagen, Denmark, hosted by former Eurovision contestants Katrina Leskanich and Renārs Kaupers. 14 songs from Eurovision history, chosen by fans and the contest's Reference Group, competed to determine the most popular song from the contest's first 50 years. Broadcast live in 31 countries which had competed in Eurovision at that point, the combined votes of the viewing public and juries selected a winner over two rounds. The winning song, announced at the end of the show, was "Waterloo" by ABBA, the winning song from the 1974 contest for Sweden.

The Eurovision Song Contest 2006 was the fifty-first edition of the contest, organised by the Hellenic Broadcasting Corporation (ERT) and held on 18 and 20 May 2006 at the Olympic Indoor Hall in Athens, Greece. 37 nations competed in the contest, with the first appearance of Armenia. Serbia and Montenegro had intended to compete, but controversy over the winner of their national selection resulted in their late withdrawal. A new landmark was achieved at this contest with the performance of the 1,000th song in Eurovision history, when Ireland's Brian Kennedy performed "Every Song Is a Cry for Love" in the semi-final. 45 years after first entering the contest, Finland secured its first win, represented by Lordi and "Hard Rock Hallelujah".

The Eurovision Song Contest 2007 was the fifty-second edition of the contest, organised by Yleisradio (YLE) and held on 10 and 12 May 2007 at the Hartwall Arena in Helsinki, Finland. A record 42 countries competed in the contest, which saw the debut entries from the Czech Republic, Georgia, Montenegro and Serbia, the latter two as independent countries for the first time. 28 countries competed in the single semi-final, the biggest number of participants ever seen in a Eurovision show. Serbia became only the second country to win on its debut appearance, represented by Marija Šerifović and "Molitva".

The Eurovision Song Contest 2008 was the fifty-third edition of the contest, organised by the Radio Television of Serbia (RTS) and held on 20, 22 and 24 May 2008 at the Belgrade Arena in Belgrade, Serbia. A new record 43 countries competed in the contest, with Azerbaijan and San Marino making their first appearances in the contest. A second semi-final was introduced at this contest, with all countries except the hosts and the "Big Four" now competing on one of the two semi-finals. Russia gained its first contest win, represented by Dima Bilan and the song "Believe"; it was Bilan's second appearance in the contest, having previously come second for Russia in 2006.

The Eurovision Song Contest 2009 was the fifty-fourth edition of the contest, organised by Channel One (C1R) and held on 12, 14 and 16 May 2009 at the Olimpiyskiy Arena in Moscow, Russia. 42 countries competed, including Slovakia in its first appearance in 11 years. Georgia's entry was embroiled in controversy, when it was accused of being critical of Russian leader Vladimir Putin following the recent Russo-Georgian War; after requests made by the EBU to change the lyrics were rejected, Georgia subsequently withdrew. Juries returned to the contest this year, with the points awarded in the final decided by an equal mix of jury and televoting; the qualifiers from the semi-finals however remained predominantly decided by televoting in this contest. Norway secured its third contest win, as Alexander Rybak earned a runaway victory with "Fairytale"; with 387 points, Rybak earned the highest points total yet seen in the contest, which remains the highest total under this system.

== 2010s ==
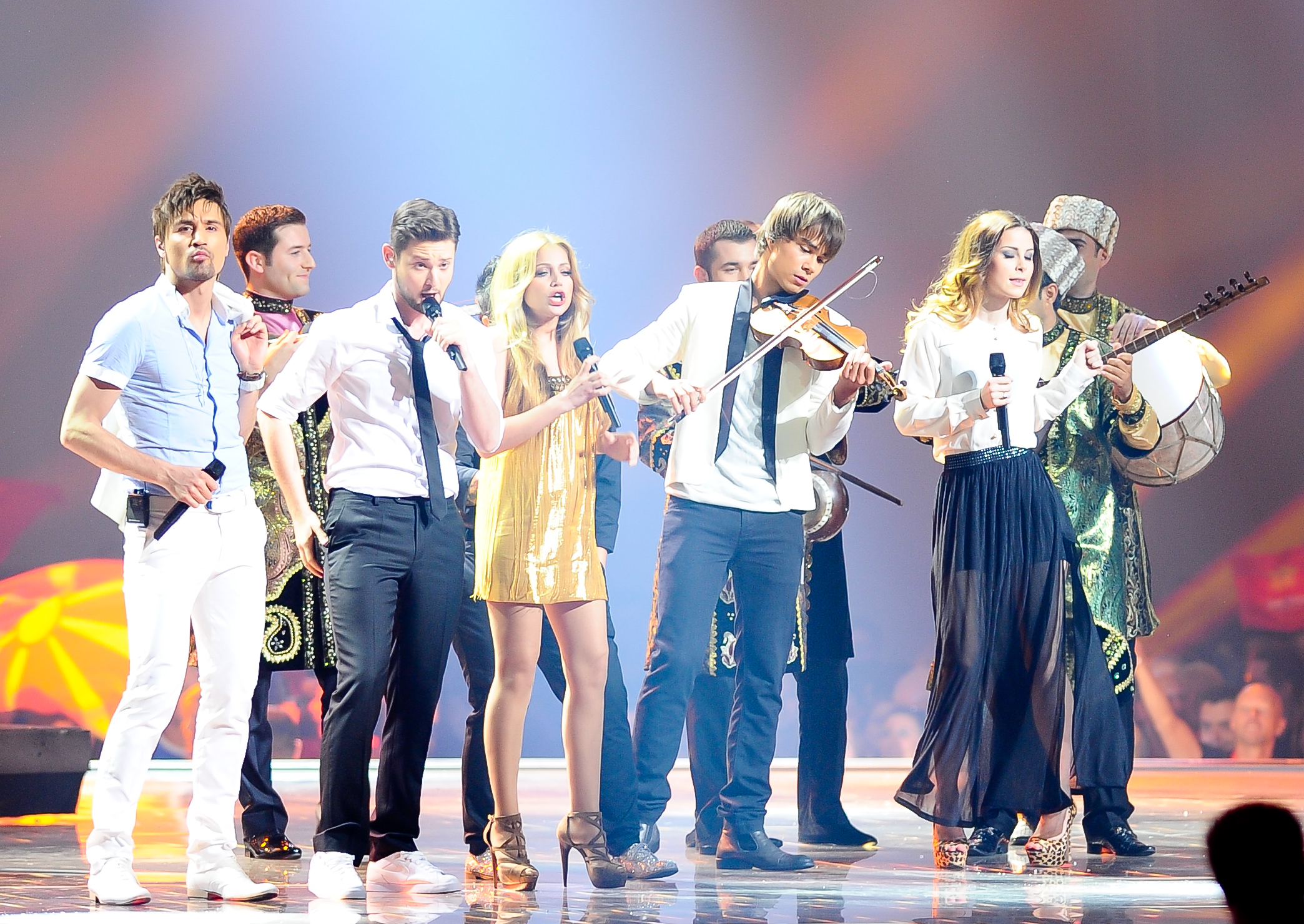
Five previous Eurovision-winning acts performed as part of the interval at the 2012 contest in Baku.

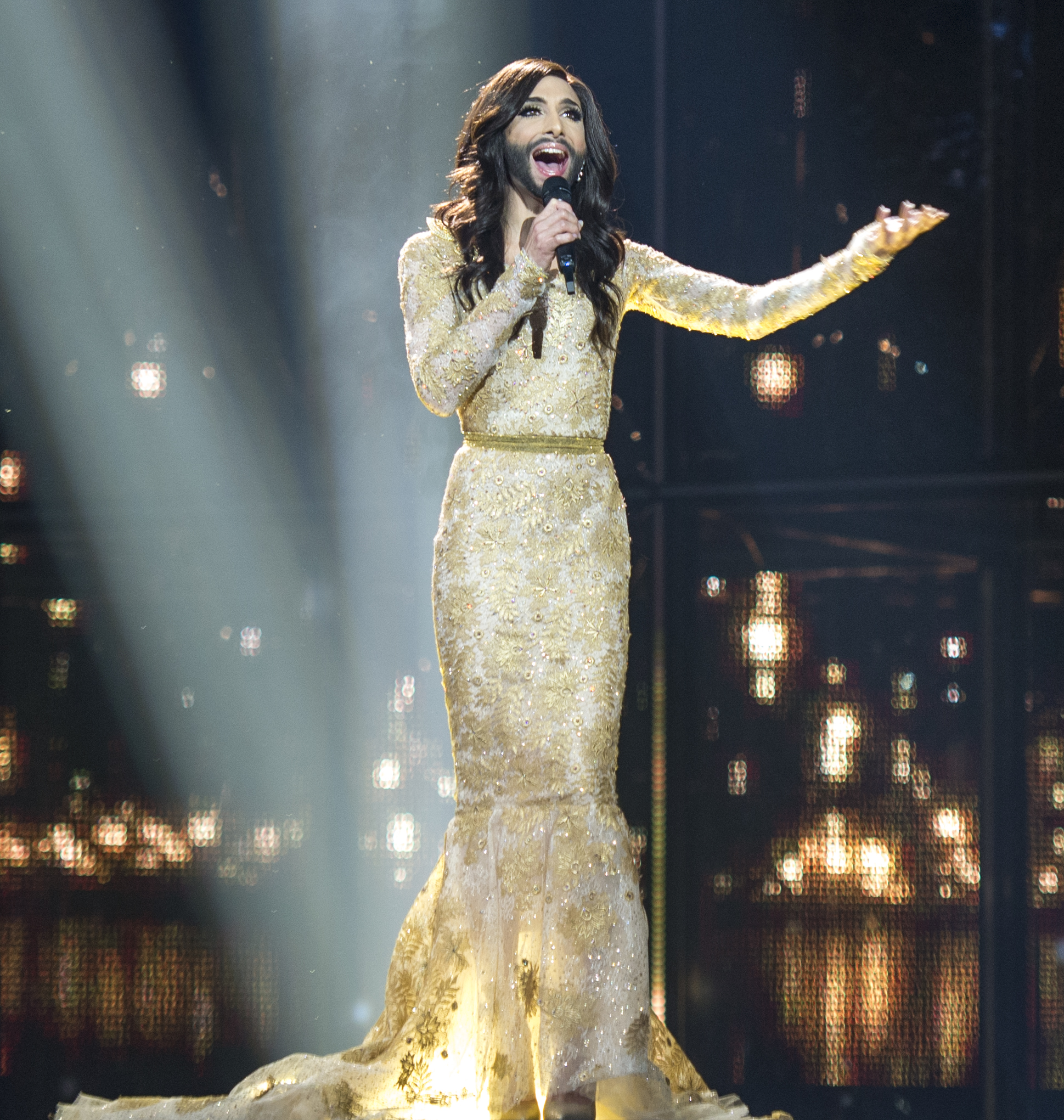
Conchita Wurst became the second Austrian artist to win the contest in 2014.

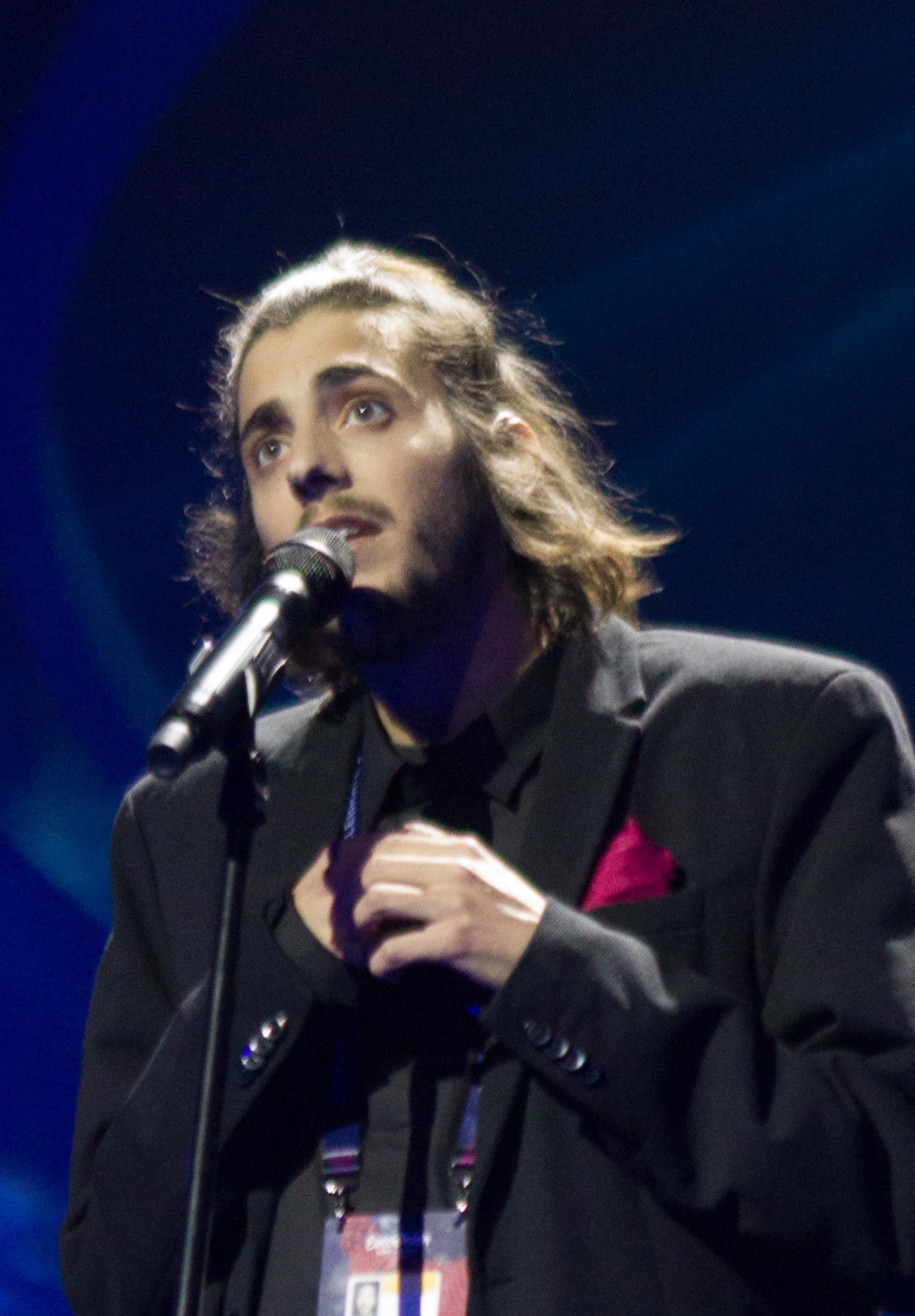
Portugal gained its first Eurovision title after 53 years of competition, when Salvador Sobral won the 2017 contest.

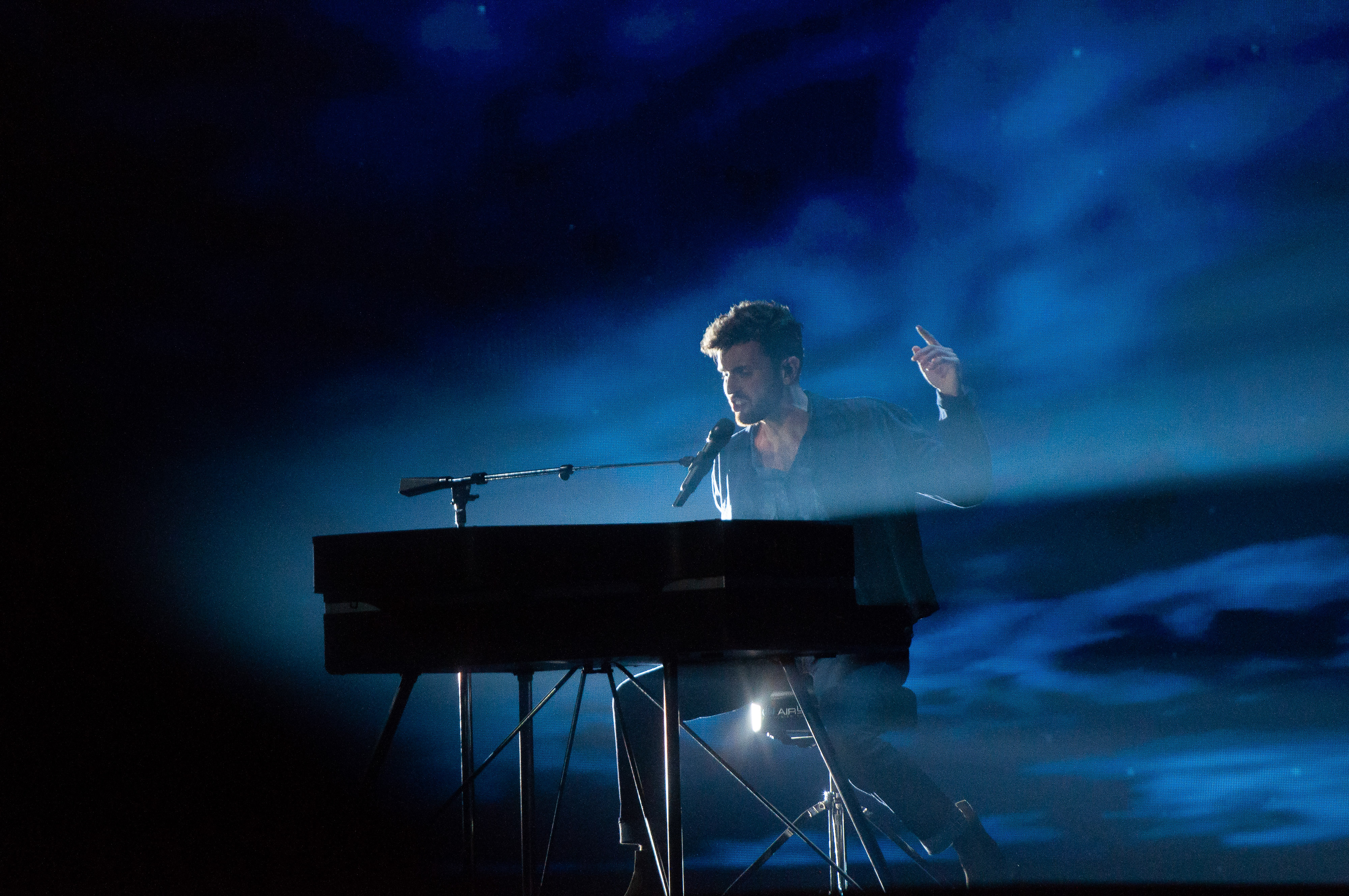
Duncan Laurence's "Arcade", winner of the 2019 contest for the Netherlands, became the first Eurovision song of the 21st century to chart on the US Billboard Hot 100.

The Eurovision Song Contest 2010 was the fifty-fifth edition of the contest, organised by NRK and held on 25, 27 and 29 May 2010 at the Telenor Arena in Oslo, Norway. 39 countries participated in total, with Georgia returning after a year's absence. Several countries withdrew for this year due to the effects of the 2008 financial crisis, including Andorra which has yet to make a reappearance, with the crisis also impacting the production of the contest. The mix of jury and televoting seen in the 2009 final was extended into the semi-finals this year, each with an equal stake in determining the 10 qualifiers in each semi-final. Germany gained its second contest win, becoming the first "Big Four" country to win since its formation in 1999, with Lena the first German winner in 28 years with "Satellite".

The Eurovision Song Contest 2011 was the fifty-sixth edition of the contest, organised by Norddeutscher Rundfunk (NDR) on behalf of ARD and held on 10, 12 and 14 May 2011 at the Düsseldorf Arena in Düsseldorf, Germany. 43 countries competed in the third contest held on German soil, equalling the record set in 2008; among the returning countries was Italy, making its first appearance since 1997, which automatically qualified for the final as a member of the newly expanded "Big Five". Azerbaijan earned its first title, represented by Ell & Nikki and the song "Running Scared".

The Eurovision Song Contest 2012 was the fifty-seventh edition of the contest, organised by İctimai Television (İTV) and held on 22, 24 and 26 May 2012 at the Baku Crystal Hall in Baku, Azerbaijan. 42 countries competed in the contest; Armenia had originally applied to compete, but withdrew at a late stage due to security concerns related to the ongoing conflict between Armenia and Azerbaijan. The contest was also marked by concerns over Azerbaijan's human rights record, as well as tensions with neighbouring Iran over the "anti-Islamic" nature of the contest. Sweden secured its fifth Eurovision title, represented by Loreen and "Euphoria", which would go on to become a great commercial success following the contest, selling over two million copies worldwide.

The Eurovision Song Contest 2013 was the fifty-eighth edition of the contest, organised by SVT and held on 14, 16 and 18 May 2013 at the Malmö Arena in Malmö, Sweden. 39 countries competed in total, with Armenia returning after a year's absence; among the withdrawing countries were Slovakia and Turkey, which have yet to make subsequent appearances in the contest, with the Turkish broadcaster TRT citing amendments to the contest rules in recent years, as well as espousing criticism of the LGBT nature of some performances, as reasons for their continued non-participation. Denmark won the contest for the third time, represented by Emmelie de Forest and "Only Teardrops".

The Eurovision Song Contest 2014 was the fifty-ninth edition of the contest, organised by DR and held on 6, 8 and 10 May 2014 at the B&W Hallerne in Copenhagen, Denmark. Artists representing 37 countries competed in Denmark's third contest as host, with Austria emerging as the victor to gain their second victory, their first in 48 years, with Conchita Wurst and "Rise Like a Phoenix". The bearded drag queen's victory proved controversial among some, particularly in Russia where several conservative voices voiced criticism of her win. Developments in Russia, particularly the introduction of a gay propaganda law and the annexation of Crimea from Ukraine, were also present in the contest when audible booing could be heard during the Russian entry and voting.

In celebration of the contest's sixtieth anniversary, the EBU organised a special concert at the Hammersmith Apollo in London, United Kingdom on 31 March 2015. Eurovision Song Contest's Greatest Hits featured live performances from fifteen previous Eurovision acts from thirteen countries, video montages of past editions of the contest and footage of former entries, and a performance by the cast of Riverdance, originally conceived as the interval performance for the 1994 contest before being developed into a full production. A BBC production, the concert was recorded live and aired as a delayed broadcast on various dates that suited the individual participating broadcasters: the BBC and Ireland's RTÉ were the first to broadcast the event, in a simulcast on 3 April 2015.

The Eurovision Song Contest 2015 was the sixtieth edition of the contest, organised by ORF and held on 19, 21 and 23 May 2015 at Wiener Stadthalle in Vienna, Austria. 39 countries were initially announced as appearing at the contest, the first held in Austria since 1967; Australia was later added as the 40th country, making its first appearance in what was billed as a one-off to celebrate the contest's 60th anniversary. Australia would advance directly to the final, meaning 27 countries would compete in the largest final ever seen in the contest. Sweden earned its sixth contest victory, represented by Måns Zelmerlöw and "Heroes".

The Eurovision Song Contest 2016 was the sixty-first edition of the contest, organised by SVT and held on 10, 12 and 14 May 2016 at the Globe Arena in Stockholm, Sweden. 43 countries were initially announced as being represented at the contest, with Australia being invited to compete for a second time; Romania was subsequently barred from competing due to outstanding debts owed by the Romanian broadcaster TVR, leaving 42 countries to compete in Sweden's sixth outing as hosts. The voting system was transformed for the first time in over 30 years at this contest: each country would now award two sets of points, representing the votes of each country's jury and public separately. Ukraine recorded its second win in the contest, courtesy of Jamala with "1944".

The Eurovision Song Contest 2017 was the sixty-second edition of the contest, organised by the Public Broadcasting Company of Ukraine (UA:PBC) and held on 9, 11 and 13 May 2017 at the International Exhibition Centre in Kyiv, Ukraine. 43 countries applied to take part in the contest, however only 42 would subsequently take part in Ukraine's second contest: Russia were unable to compete after Ukrainian authorities banned their selected performer Yuliya Samoylova from entering Ukraine due to illegally entering Crimea in 2015, with proposals for Samoylova to compete via satellite from Russia being rejected by the Russian broadcaster. Portugal earned its first Eurovision title, 53 years after first entering the contest, with Salvador Sobral earning the biggest points total ever seen in Eurovision history as "Amar pelos dois" gained 758 points.

The Eurovision Song Contest 2018 was the sixty-third edition of the contest, organised by Rádio e Televisão de Portugal (RTP) and held on 8, 10 and 12 May 2018 at the Altice Arena in Lisbon, Portugal. 43 countries competed in this contest, matching the previous record, with Russia returning after its absence the previous year. This contest saw the performance of Eurovision's 1,500th song, when former winner Alexander Rybak performed "That's How You Write a Song" in the second semi-final for Norway. Israel gained its fourth Eurovision title, represented by Netta with "Toy".

The Eurovision Song Contest 2019 was the sixty-fourth edition of the contest, organised by the Israeli Public Broadcasting Corporation (IPBC/Kan) and held on 14, 16 and 18 May 2019 at Expo Tel Aviv in Tel Aviv, Israel. The third Israeli contest was marked by controversy on multiple fronts, with Orthodox religious leaders and politicians in Israel calling on the contest to not interfere with Shabbat, while other groups, including BDS, called for a boycott of the event in response to the country's policies towards Palestinians in the West Bank and Gaza, and in opposition to what some consider as "pinkwashing" by the Israeli government. 42 countries were initially announced as competing in this contest, with Australia having secured participation rights up to 2023. However, only 41 countries entered when Ukraine subsequently withdrew: conflicts between the Ukrainian broadcaster UA:PBC and the winner of its national selection Maruv led to the latter refusing to compete, resulting in its withdrawal after other acts from the selection also declined to partake. The Netherlands recorded its fifth Eurovision win and first in 44 years, courtesy of Duncan Laurence with "Arcade", which would later become a sleeper hit in 2021, becoming the most-streamed Eurovision song on Spotify and the first since "Ooh Aah... Just a Little Bit" to chart on the US Billboard Hot 100, eventually reaching the top 30 of the chart.

== 2020s ==
The Eurovision Song Contest 2020 was scheduled to be held on 12, 14 and 16 May 2020 at Rotterdam Ahoy in Rotterdam, Netherlands and organised by Nederlandse Publieke Omroep (NPO), NOS and AVROTROS. 41 countries applied to enter what would have been the Netherlands' fifth contest as hosts, but in March 2020, for the first time in its history, the contest was cancelled due to the uncertainty caused by the COVID-19 pandemic and the restrictions put in place by governments across Europe, which included lockdowns and travel restrictions. In its place, a special broadcast from Media Park in Hilversum, Eurovision: Europe Shine a Light, was held on what would have been the day of the final, in a celebration and showcase of the artists and songs that would have competed in the 2020 contest in a non-competitive format, as well as featuring performances by former Eurovision artists.

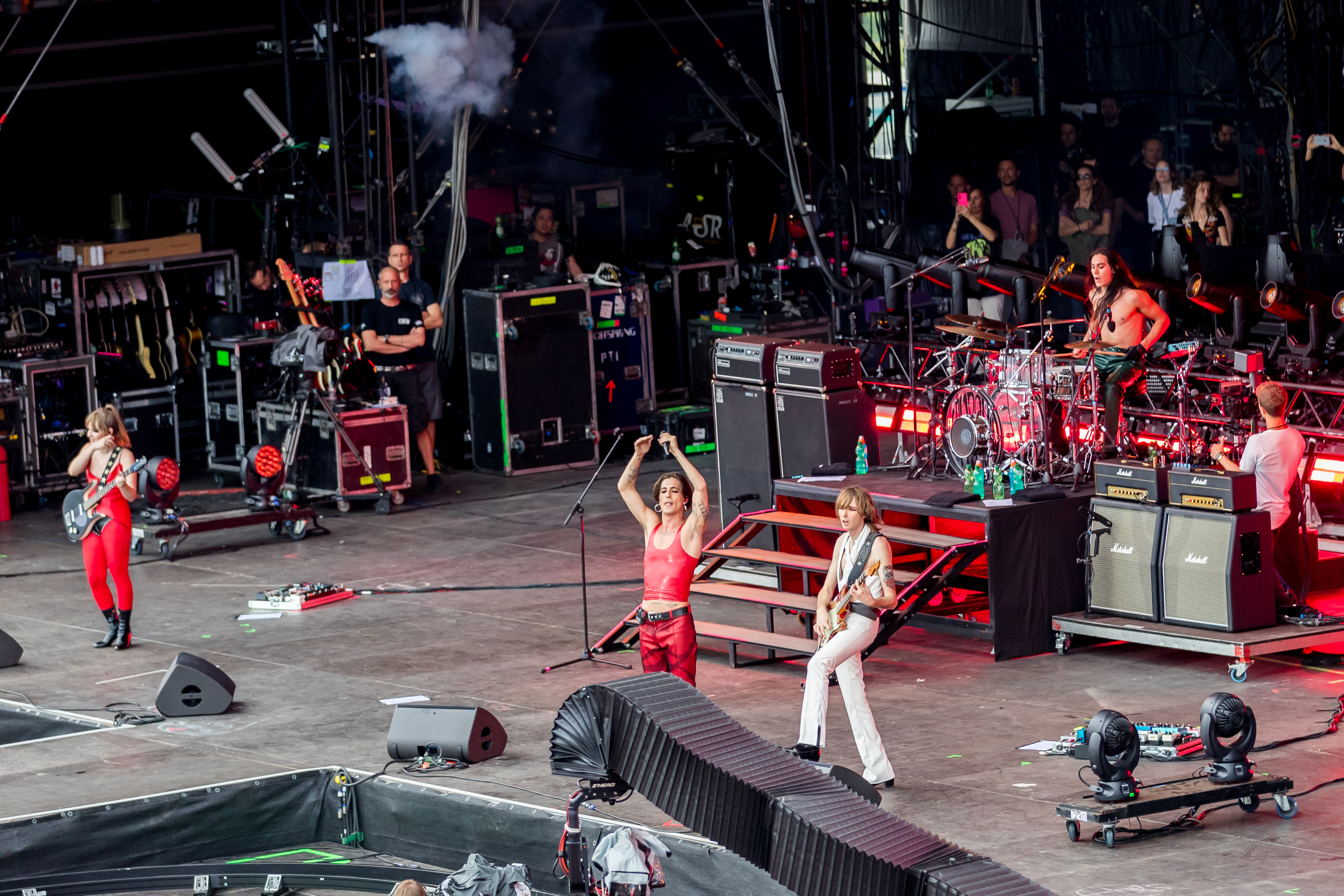
Italy's Måneskin achieved international breakthrough following their Eurovision win in 2021.

The Eurovision Song Contest 2021 was the sixty-fifth edition of the contest, held on 18, 20 and 22 May 2021 at Rotterdam Ahoy in Rotterdam, Netherlands and organised by NPO, NOS and AVROTROS. Rotterdam was revealed as the host city of the 2021 contest during Eurovision: Europe Shine a Light. Many of the artists which had initially been selected to compete in 2020 were confirmed for their countries once again, however any song entered into the 2020 contest was ineligible for 2021 per the rules of the contest. Pre-recorded backing vocals were permitted for the first time in 2021 on a trial basis, announced as an effort to modernise and increase the sustainability of the contest. The same 41 countries which had originally planned to enter the 2020 contest were initially announced as competing again in this contest, however, a late withdrawal of Armenia and subsequent disqualification of the entry from Belarus brought the number of competing countries down to 39. Multiple contingency scenarios were devised in response to the COVID-19 pandemic, ranging from a normal, albeit less-crowded contest (which was the chosen option) to a fully-remote contest with participants performing via 'live-on-tape' recordings. Australia and Iceland were ultimately unable to perform at the contest live: the Australian delegation opted to use their 'live-on-tape' performance given logistical difficulties in travelling abroad as part of the country's pandemic response; while Iceland competed using rehearsal footage following a COVID-19 outbreak among its delegation. Italy recorded its third Eurovision win, becoming the second "Big Five" country to win since its formation, as Måneskin ended a 31-year wait for victory with "Zitti e buoni". Second-placed France and third-placed Switzerland also achieved their best results since 1991 and 1993 respectively. Måneskin's win in the contest marked the band's international breakthrough, with their releases entering numerous European and global weekly charts in the months following their victory.

The Eurovision Song Contest 2022 was the sixty-sixth edition of the contest, held on 10, 12 and 14 May 2022 at the PalaOlimpico in Turin, Italy and organised by RAI. 41 countries applied to take part in the contest, with Armenia and Montenegro submitting their first entries since 2019. Russia, which had initially appeared on the list, was subsequently barred from competing following its invasion of Ukraine in February 2022, resulting in 40 countries competing in Italy's third outing as hosts. Ukraine recorded its third win in the contest, represented by Kalush Orchestra with "Stefania", while the United Kingdom, which placed second, and Spain, which placed third, also achieved their best results since 1998 and 1995 respectively.

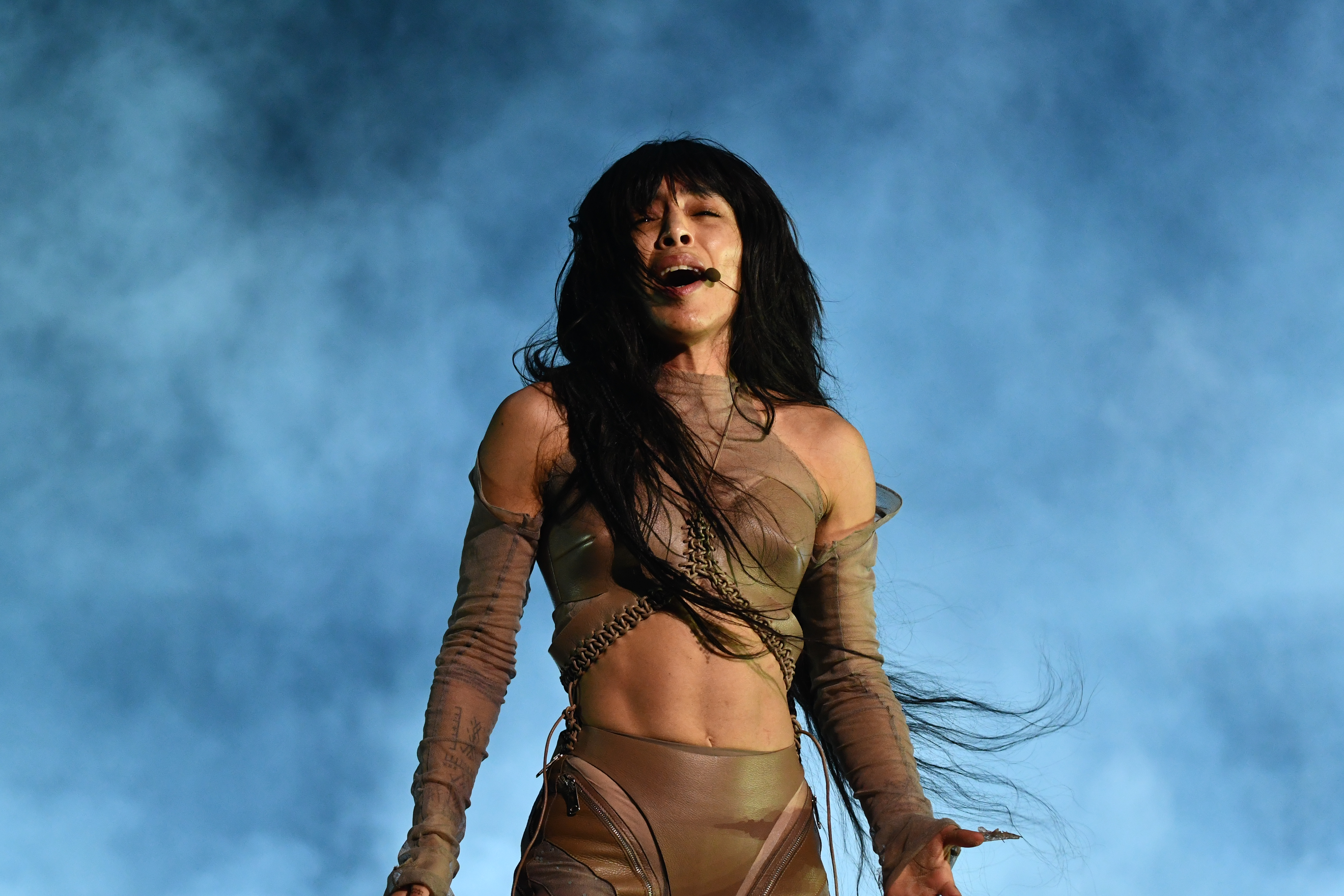
Upon winning the 2023 contest, Loreen became the second artist to win the contest twice, having previously won in 2012, and helped Sweden equal Ireland's record of seven contest wins.

The Eurovision Song Contest 2023 was the sixty-seventh edition of the contest, held on 9, 11 and 13 May 2023 at the Liverpool Arena in Liverpool, United Kingdom and organised by the BBC. Ukraine's UA:PBC was initially given the opportunity to host following its victory the previous year, but due to security concerns caused by the Russian invasion of the country, the BBC was chosen, as the runner-up, to host the contest on its behalf. 37 countries applied to take part in the ninth contest held in the UK, with several countries withdrawing for this year due to the effects of the global energy crisis. Substantial changes to the voting system were made for this contest, with full televoting returning to determine the qualifiers from the semi-finals, and viewers from non-participating countries being allowed to vote in all shows, with their votes being aggregated and awarded as one set of points from an "extra country" for the overall public vote. Loreen, the winner of the 2012 contest, returned for Sweden and became the second artist to record two wins in the contest with "Tattoo", and in doing so giving Sweden a record-tying seventh contest win.

The Eurovision Song Contest 2024 was the sixty-eighth edition of the contest, held on 7, 9 and 11 May 2024 at the Malmö Arena in Malmö, Sweden and organised by SVT. 37 countries applied to take part in the seventh contest held on Swedish soil, with Luxembourg making its first appearance since 1993. Romania, whose broadcaster TVR had been given additional time to finalise its plans, ultimately opted not to participate this year. The slogan of the previous year's event in Liverpool, "United by Music", was retained for 2024 and all future editions, thus ending the practice of individual slogans being created for each edition which had begun in 2002. Switzerland recorded its third victory and first in 36 years, courtesy of Nemo with "The Code", while second-placed Croatia obtained its best result as an independent nation. This edition was beset by numerous controversies, most notably Israel's participation amidst the Gaza war with protests and petitions calling for or against the country's removal, and audible booing during the Israeli entry and voting, as well as the disqualification of the Netherlands ahead of the final due to a backstage incident involving its entrant Joost Klein and a production staff member, though the country retained its right to vote.

The Eurovision Song Contest 2025 was the sixty-ninth edition of the contest, held on 13, 15 and 17 May 2025 at St. Jakobshalle in Basel, Switzerland and organised by SRG SSR. 38 countries initially registered to compete in the contest, with Montenegro returning after a two-year absence. Moldova, which had initially appeared on the list, subsequently withdrew due to economic reasons and the quality of its national selection, resulting in 37 countries partaking in the third edition held in Switzerland. Austria earned its third victory, represented by JJ with "Wasted Love". Israel's participation was once again a contentious issue, and the country ultimately won the public vote and finished in second place.

The Eurovision Song Contest 2026 was the seventieth edition of the contest, held on 12, 14 and 16 May 2026 at Wiener Stadthalle in Vienna, Austria and organised by ORF. Israel's presence in the contest continued to cause controversy, with Iceland, Ireland, the Netherlands, Slovenia, and Spain choosing not to participate this year after Israel was permitted to compete. Bulgaria, Moldova, and Romania returned after recent absences, resulting in Austria's third contest as hosts featuring 35 countries, the lowest amount of participants since 2003, before semi-finals were introduced. The juries were again brought in to determine half of the results of the semi-finals, with other adjustments made to the voting rules in reaction to Israel's result the previous year. Bulgaria earned its first Eurovision title, courtesy of Dara with "Bangaranga".

The Eurovision Song Contest 2027 will be the seventy-first edition of the contest, to be held on 11, 13 and 15 May 2027 at Arena Burgas in Burgas, Bulgaria and organised by Bulgarian National Television (BNT).

== Sources ==
- O'Connor, John Kennedy (2010). The Eurovision Song Contest: The Official History (2nd ed.). London: Carlton Books. ISBN 978-1-84732-521-1.
- Roxburgh, Gordon (2012). Songs for Europe: The United Kingdom at the Eurovision Song Contest. Vol. One: The 1950s and 1960s. Prestatyn: Telos Publishing. ISBN 978-1-84583-065-6.
- Roxburgh, Gordon (2014). Songs for Europe: The United Kingdom at the Eurovision Song Contest. Vol. Two: The 1970s. Prestatyn: Telos Publishing. ISBN 978-1-84583-093-9.
- Roxburgh, Gordon (2016). Songs for Europe: The United Kingdom at the Eurovision Song Contest. Vol. Three: The 1980s. Prestatyn: Telos Publishing. ISBN 978-1-84583-118-9.
- Roxburgh, Gordon (2020). Songs for Europe: The United Kingdom at the Eurovision Song Contest. Vol. Four: The 1990s. Prestatyn: Telos Publishing. ISBN 978-1-84583-163-9.
- West, Chris (2020). Eurovision! A History of Modern Europe Through the World's Greatest Song Contest (2nd ed.). London: Melville House UK. ISBN 978-1-911545-55-2.
