= Portugal in the Eurovision Song Contest 1976 =

- Eurovision Song Contest 1976
- Participating broadcaster: Radiotelevisão Portuguesa (RTP)
- Country: Portugal
- Selection process: Artist: Internal selection Song: Grande Prémio TV da Canção Portuguesa 1976
- Announcement date: 7 March 1976

Competing entry
- Song: "Uma flor de verde pinho"
- Artist: Carlos do Carmo
- Songwriters: José Niza; Manuel Alegre

Placement
- Final result: 12th, 24 points

Participation chronology

Portugal was represented at the Eurovision Song Contest 1976 with the song "Uma flor de verde pinho", composed by José Niza, with lyrics by Manuel Alegre, and performed by Carlos do Carmo. The Portuguese participating broadcaster, Radiotelevisão Portuguesa (RTP), selected its entry at the Grande Prémio TV da Canção Portuguesa 1976, after having previously selected the performer internally.

== Before Eurovision ==
=== Grande Prémio TV da Canção Portuguesa 1976 ===
Radiotelevisão Portuguesa (RTP) held the Grande Prémio TV da Canção Portuguesa 1976 at its Lumiar studios in Lisbon on 7 March 1976, hosted by António Vitorino de Almeida, Ana Zanatti, and Eládio Clímaco. Eight songs took part in the final. Thilo Krasmann conducted all the songs.

For the first time, only one singer was chosen to perform all the songs: Carlos do Carmo, a highly respected fado singer, was invited to perform the eight songs, chosen by public contest.

The voting system was once again changed: for the first time, the public was invited to participate in the choosing of the song, casting votes via postcards until 3 March. On 22 February, the eight compositions were presented to the general public, on RTP1 and on the 23rd on RTP2, although the respective authors and composers were not yet known. On 7 March, and after the votes of the Portuguese people were scrutinized, the eight songs are again presented from 8th to 1st place, where the authors of each theme and the percentage of votes obtained for each song were revealed.

Grande Prémio TV da Canção Portuguesa - 7 March 1976
R/O	Song	Percentage	Place
1	"Onde é que tu moras"	4.70%	7
2	"Estrela da tarde"	9.29%	6
3	"Os lobos e ninguém"	9.84%	5
4	"Novo fado alegre"	23.97%	2
5	"No teu poema"	13.24%	3
6	"Maria-criada, Maria-senhora"	3.58%	8
7	"Cantiga de Maio"	10.13%	4
8	"Uma flor de verde pinho"	25.25%	1

== At Eurovision ==
On the night of the final, Carmo performed 15th in the running order, following Austria and preceding Monaco. At the close of the voting the song had received 24 points, coming 12th in the field of 18 competing countries. The orchestra during the Portuguese entry was conducted by Thilo Krasmann.

=== Voting ===
Points awarded to Portugal
Score	Country
12 points	France
10 points	
8 points	
7 points	
6 points	Luxembourg
5 points	
4 points	Greece
3 points	
2 points	
1 point	Finland; Italy

Points awarded by Portugal
Score	Country
12 points	United Kingdom
10 points	Italy
8 points	Belgium
7 points	Switzerland
6 points	Netherlands
5 points	France
4 points	Norway
3 points	Monaco
2 points	Israel
1 point	Greece
