= Netherlands in the Eurovision Song Contest 1976 =

- Eurovision Song Contest 1976
- Participating broadcaster: Nederlandse Omroep Stichting (NOS)
- Country: Netherlands
- Selection process: Nationaal Songfestival 1976
- Selection date: 18 February 1976

Competing entry
- Song: "The Party's Over"
- Artist: Sandra Reemer
- Songwriter: Hans van Hemert

Placement
- Final result: 9th, 56 points

Participation chronology

The Netherlands was represented at the Eurovision Song Contest 1976 with the song "The Party's Over", written by Hans van Hemert, and performed by Sandra Reemer. The Dutch participating broadcaster, Nederlandse Omroep Stichting (NOS), selected its entry through a national final. In addition, NOS was also the host broadcaster and staged the event at the Nederlands Congresgebouw in The Hague, after winning the previous edition with the song "Ding-a-dong" by Teach-In. This was the second of Reemer's three Eurovision appearances for the Netherlands: she had sung in the 1972 contest in a duo with Dries Holten (Andres), and would also take part in the 1979 contest under the name of Xandra.

== Before Eurovision ==
=== Nationaal Songfestival 1976 ===
Nederlandse Omroep Stichting (NOS) held the national final at the Nederlands Congresgebouw in The Hague (the same venue where the Eurovision final was to take place) on 18 February 1976, hosted by Willem Duys.

Five songs took part, with the winner being decided by eleven regional juries who each had 10 points to allocate between the songs. All the acts were well-known hitmakers in the Netherlands. "The Party's Over" emerged the winner.

Final – 18 February 1976
R/O	Artist	Song	Points	Place
1	Spooky & Sue	"Do You Dig It"	5	5
2	Bolland & Bolland	"Souvenir"	30	2
3	Sandra Reemer	"The Party's Over"	35	1
4	Rosy & Andres	"I Was Born to Love"	17	4
5	Lucifer	"Someone Is Waiting for You"	23	3

== At Eurovision ==
On the night of the final Reemer performed 8th in the running order, following Ireland and preceding Norway. At the close of voting "The Party's Over" had received 56 points from 14 countries, placing the Netherlands 9th of the 18 entries. The Dutch jury awarded its 12 points to France.

The Dutch conductor at the contest was Harry van Hoof.

=== Voting ===
Points awarded to the Netherlands
Score	Country
12 points	
10 points	
8 points	Israel
7 points	Greece
6 points	Portugal
5 points	Yugoslavia
4 points	Austria; Belgium; Germany; Luxembourg; Switzerland
3 points	Spain
2 points	Ireland; Italy; Monaco
1 point	Norway

Points awarded by the Netherlands
Score	Country
12 points	France
10 points	United Kingdom
8 points	Monaco
7 points	Austria
6 points	Switzerland
5 points	Luxembourg
4 points	Belgium
3 points	Norway
2 points	Israel
1 point	Finland
