= Norway in the Eurovision Song Contest 1976 =

- Eurovision Song Contest 1976
- Participating broadcaster: Norsk rikskringkasting (NRK)
- Country: Norway
- Selection process: Melodi Grand Prix 1976
- Selection date: 7 February 1976

Competing entry
- Song: "Mata Hari"
- Artist: Anne-Karine Strøm
- Songwriters: Frode Thingnæs; Philip Kruse

Placement
- Final result: 18th, 7 points

Participation chronology

Norway was represented at the Eurovision Song Contest 1976 with the song "Mata Hari", composed by Frode Thingnæs, with lyrics by Philip Kruse, and performed by Anne-Karine Strøm. The Norwegian participating broadcaster, Norsk rikskringkasting (NRK), organised the national final Melodi Grand Prix 1976 in order to select its entry for the contest. This was a third Eurovision appearance in four contests for Strøm (after 1973 and 1974).

== Before Eurovision ==
=== Melodi Grand Prix 1976 ===
Norsk rikskringkasting (NRK) held the Melodi Grand Prix 1976 at Centralteatret in Oslo, hosted by Jan Voigt. Five songs were presented in the final with each song sung twice by different singers, once with a small combo and once with a full orchestra which was conducted by Helge Hurum. The winning song was chosen by voting from ten regional juries.

Final – 7 February 1976
| R/O | Artist | | Song | Songwriters(s) | Points | Place |
| R/O | Combo | Orchestra | Song | Songwriters(s) | Points | Place |
|---|---|---|---|---|---|---|
| 1 | Jahn Teigen | Anita Skorgan | "Hastverk" | Kristian Hauger; Hans Hauger | 226 | 3 |
| 2 | Gudny Aspaas & Jahn Teigen | Dag Spantell, Anne Lise Gjøstøl, Gro Anita Schønn & Stein Ingebrigtsen | "Alltid en vind" | Tor Hultin; Bjørn Endreson | 147 | 4 |
| 3 | Gudny Aspaas | Hans Petter Hansen | "Du fikk meg glad" | Magne Amdahl; Kjell Erik Vindtorn | 131 | 5 |
| 4 | Gudny Aspaas & Jahn Teigen | Inger Lise Rypdal & Jahn Teigen | "Voodoo" | Terje Rypdal | 351 | 2 |
| 5 | Gudny Aspaas | Anne-Karine Strøm | "Mata Hari" | Frode Thingnæs; Philip Kruse | 643 | 1 |

Detailed Regional Jury Votes
| R/O | Song | Vadsø | Tromsø | Bodø | Trondheim | Ålesund | Bergen | Stavanger | Kristiansand | Lillehammer | Oslo | Total |
|---|---|---|---|---|---|---|---|---|---|---|---|---|
| 1 | "Hastverk" | 13 | 19 | 12 | 21 | 36 | 41 | 11 | 48 | 21 | 4 | 226 |
| 2 | "Alltid en vind" | 9 | 20 | 14 | 10 | 18 | 21 | 15 | 14 | 6 | 20 | 147 |
| 3 | "Du fikk meg glad" | 13 | 12 | 12 | 5 | 20 | 7 | 7 | 33 | 13 | 9 | 131 |
| 4 | "Voodoo" | 31 | 27 | 31 | 47 | 23 | 25 | 29 | 17 | 71 | 50 | 351 |
| 5 | "Mata Hari" | 84 | 72 | 81 | 67 | 53 | 54 | 88 | 38 | 39 | 67 | 643 |

== At Eurovision ==
On the night of the final Strøm performed 9th in the running order, following the Netherlands and preceding Greece. At the close of voting "Mata Hari" had picked up only 7 points, placing Norway last of the 18 entries, the fourth time the country had finished the evening at the foot of the scoreboard. The Norwegian jury awarded its 12 points to contest winners the United Kingdom.

=== Voting ===
Points awarded to Norway
| Score | Country |
|---|---|
| 12 points | |
| 10 points | |
| 8 points | |
| 7 points | |
| 6 points | |
| 5 points | |
| 4 points | Portugal |
| 3 points | Netherlands |
| 2 points | |
| 1 point | |

Points awarded by Norway
| Score | Country |
|---|---|
| 12 points | United Kingdom |
| 10 points | Switzerland |
| 8 points | France |
| 7 points | Israel |
| 6 points | Belgium |
| 5 points | Monaco |
| 4 points | Finland |
| 3 points | Italy |
| 2 points | Austria |
| 1 point | Netherlands |
