= Tony Rallo =

French songwriter and orchestra conductor

Tony Rallo is a songwriter and orchestra conductor from Tunis.

== Biography ==
Rallo has written a number of songs for other artists, such as Dalida, Catherine Ferry, Caroline Verdi, Francis Lalanne, Daniel Guichard, Johnny Hallyday, and Charles Aznavour.

He was the orchestra leader for a number of arrangements for Aznavour and Dalida on the Barclay label. He was also conductor for the French Eurovision Song Contest entry in 1976, Catherine Ferry's song "Un, Deux, Trois".

As a performer, Rallo scored a top 40 hit in the UK singles chart, with the double a-side single "Holdin' On"/"Burnin' Alive" reaching number 34 in March 1980. The song was credited to Tony Rallo and the Midnite Band, the band being made up of session musicians, including backing vocalists John and Arthur Simms (as The Midnite Voices), drummer Peter Van Hooke, bassist Mo Foster, guitarists Rick Hitchcock and Hugh Burns, keyboardist John Mealing, percussionist Frank Ricotti, synthesizer programmist Georges Rodi, the Pat Halling String Ensemble, and brass section Michael Brecker, Randy Brecker, George Young, and Jon Faddis. Most of the Midnite Band were regular collaborators with producer Alec R. Costandinos, and had appeared on the Love & Kisses album You Must Be Love.
