= Eurovision Song Contest 1976 =

International song competition

Date and venue
- Final: 3 April 1976
- Venue: Nederlands Congresgebouw; The Hague, Netherlands

Organisation
- Organiser: European Broadcasting Union (EBU)
- Scrutineer: Clifford Brown

Production
- Host broadcaster: Nederlandse Omroep Stichting (NOS)
- Director: Theo Ordeman
- Executive producer: Fred Oster
- Musical director: Jan Stulen
- Presenter: Corry Brokken

Participants
- Number of entries: 18
- Returning countries: Austria; Greece
- Non-returning countries: Malta; Sweden; Turkey
- Participation map: Competing countries Countries that participated in the past but not in 1976

Vote
- Voting system: Each country awarded 12, 10, 8-1 points to their 10 favourite songs
- Winning song: United Kingdom "Save Your Kisses for Me"

The Eurovision Song Contest 1976 was the 21st edition of the Eurovision Song Contest, held on 3 April 1976 at the Nederlands Congresgebouw in The Hague, Netherlands, and presented by Corry Brokken. It was organised by the European Broadcasting Union (EBU) and host broadcaster Nederlandse Omroep Stichting (NOS), who staged the event after winning the 1975 contest for the Netherlands with the song "Ding-a-dong" by Teach-In. Brokken had also won the contest for the Netherlands in 1957.

Broadcasters from eighteen countries participated in the contest with Sweden, Malta, and Turkey opting not to return after participating the previous year. Malta would not make their return until 1991. On the other hand, Austria and Greece returned to the competition, having been absent since 1972 and 1974 respectively.

The winner was the United Kingdom with the song "Save Your Kisses for Me", written and composed by Tony Hiller, Lee Sheriden and Martin Lee, and performed by the group Brotherhood of Man. This was the country's third victory in the contest, following their wins in 1967 and 1969. France, Monaco, Switzerland and Austria rounded out the top five.

The winning song went on to become the biggest selling winning single in the history of the contest and won with 80.39% of the possible maximum score and an average of 9.65 out of 12; a record under the voting system introduced in 1975.

== Location ==
Location of the chosen host city (in blue), other bidding cities (in red) and cities that expressed interest but ultimately did not bid (in grey)

Following the Netherlands' win in the 1975 contest, five Dutch cities bid to host the Eurovision Song Contest 1976: Amsterdam, Groningen, Rotterdam, The Hague, and Utrecht. Enschede, the hometown of the winning band Teach-In, had also expressed interest in hosting, but was ruled out due to a lack of adequate venues and sufficient hotel rooms. Amsterdam's RAI Congrescentrum and The Hague's Nederlands Congresgebouw were favoured as the most suitable venues by executive producer Fred Oster. Ultimately, the Nederlands Congresgebouw was selected; its isolated location, combined with the proximity of two major hotels, made it the ideal choice for implementing the strict security measures required in light of Israel's participation. The Willem-Alexander Hall at the venue could accommodate 1,500 spectators.

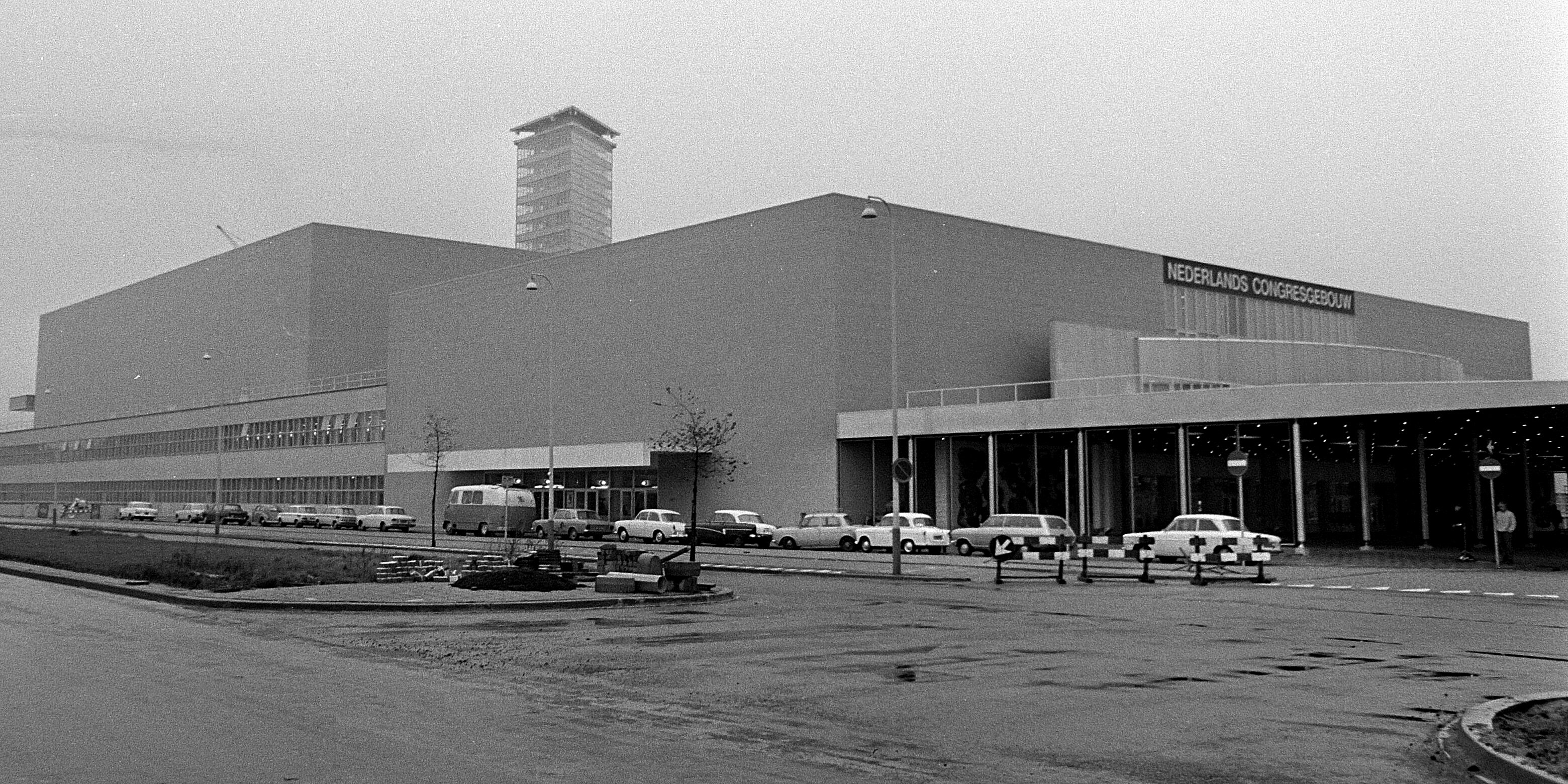
Nederlands Congresgebouw, host venue of the 1976 contest

== Participants ==
Eurovision Song Contest 1976 – Participation summaries by country
- Austria; Belgium; Finland; France; Germany; Greece; Ireland; Israel; Italy; Luxembourg; Monaco; Netherlands; Norway; Portugal; Spain; Switzerland; United Kingdom; Yugoslavia

Sweden, Malta and, Turkey all decided not to participate this year, while Austria and Greece returned to the contest, making for eighteen participating countries.

Liechtenstein attempted to enter the contest, but was ineligible due to the lack of an EBU member broadcaster.

After many controversies related to the previous year's contest, the Swedish broadcaster, Sveriges Radio (SR), decided not to participate, as they did not have enough money to host another contest if they won again. SR's withdrawal forced the introduction of a new rule in which from 1977 onwards, registration and maintenance fees would be introduced for each of the participating broadcasters, which was meant for financing future contests. These demands forced the Maltese broadcaster to withdraw, as it had a very small budget for 1976.

As the author and historian John Kennedy O'Connor notes in his book The Eurovision Song Contest – The Official History, "there had been public demonstrations in Sweden against the contest, which also played a part in SR's decision not to take part".

Several of the performing artists had previously competed as lead artists representing the same country in past editions: Fredi had represented Finland in 1967; Anneli Koivisto as part of "The Friends" had represented Finland in 1971 as part of Koivistolaiset; Peter, Sue and Marc had represented Switzerland in 1971; Sandra Reemer had represented the Netherlands in 1972 along Andres Holten; and Anne-Karine Strøm had represented Norway in 1973 as part of the Bendik Singers and in 1974.

Greece's participation sparked controversy as it referred to the Turkish invasion of Cyprus. The previous year, Greece had withdrawn from the contest for the same reason, and in 1976, it was Turkey who withdrew. The organizers informed Mariza Koch that they were not responsible for her physical integrity, as there were threats that armed Turks would be present at the venue and shoot her on stage. She signed a waiver stating that she would sing at her own risk. Rumors circulated that she was wearing a bulletproof vest when she went on stage.

Eurovision Song Contest 1976 participants
Country	Broadcaster	Artist	Song	Language	Songwriter(s)	Conductor
Austria	ORF	Waterloo and Robinson	"My Little World"	English	Gerhard Heinz	Erich Kleinschuster
Belgium	RTB	Pierre Rapsat	"Judy et Cie"	French	Pierre Rapsat; Eric Van Hulse	Michel Bernholc
Finland	YLE	Fredi and the Friends	"Pump-Pump"	English	Pertti Reponen; Matti Siitonen	Ossi Runne
France	TF1	Catherine Ferry	"Un, deux, trois"	French	Jean-Paul Cara; Tony Rallo	Tony Rallo
Germany	HR (Note: On behalf of the German public broadcasting consortium ARD)	Les Humphries Singers	"Sing, Sang, Song"	German, English	Kurt Hertha; Ralph Siegel	Les Humphries
Greece	ERT	Mariza Koch	"Panaghia mou, panaghia mou" (Παναγιά μου, παναγιά μου)	Greek	Mihalis Fotiades; Mariza Koch	Mihalis Rozakis
Ireland	RTÉ	Red Hurley	"When"	English	Brendan Graham	Noel Kelehan
Israel	IBA	Chocolate, Menta, Mastik	"Emor Shalom" (אמור שלום)	Hebrew	Matti Caspi; Ehud Manor	Matti Caspi
Italy	RAI	Romina and Al Bano	"We'll Live It All Again"	English, Italian	Albano Carrisi; Detto Mariano; Romina Power	Maurizio Fabrizio
Luxembourg	CLT	Jürgen Marcus	"Chansons pour ceux qui s'aiment"	French	Vline Buggy; Fred Jay; Jack White	Jo Plée
Monaco	TMC	Mary Christy	"Toi, la musique et moi"	French	Georges Costa; Gilbert Sinoué	Raymond Donnez
Netherlands	NOS	Sandra Reemer	"The Party Is Over Now"	English	Hans van Hemert	Harry van Hoof
Norway	NRK	Anne-Karine Strøm	"Mata Hari"	English	Philip Kruse; Frode Thingnæs	Frode Thingnæs
Portugal	RTP	Carlos do Carmo	"Uma flor de verde pinho"	Portuguese	Manuel Alegre; José Niza	Thilo Krasmann
Spain	TVE	Braulio	"Sobran las palabras"	Spanish	Braulio García Bautista	Joan Barcons
Switzerland	SRG SSR	Peter, Sue and Marc	"Djambo Djambo"	English	Peter Reber	Mario Robbiani
United Kingdom	BBC	Brotherhood of Man	"Save Your Kisses for Me"	English	Tony Hiller; Martin Lee; Lee Sheriden	Alyn Ainsworth
Yugoslavia	JRT	Ambasadori	"Ne mogu skriti svoju bol" (Не могу скрити своју бол)	Serbo-Croatian	Slobodan Đurašović; Slobodan Vujović	Esad Arnautalić

== Format ==
Following the confirmation of the eighteen competing countries, the draw to determine the running order of the contest was held on 8 January 1976.

As with the Dutch hosted contest of 1970, each song was introduced by a pre-recorded film of the performing artist on location in their home nation. Unlike the 1970 films, the Dutch broadcaster made all of the films themselves, sending a crew to each nation to capture the footage. Both the artists from Monaco and Luxembourg were filmed in their respective nations, despite again not being from the country they were representing. Each film was preceded by an animated insert featuring the flags of the eighteen participating nations and ended with a profile shot of the artists.

The interval act was The Dutch Swing College Band led by Peter Schilperoort, who performed live on the stage, intercut with brief interviews with the artists from France, Israel, Austria, Belgium and Spain backstage in the green room conducted by Hans van Willigenburg. Willigenburg asked each of the five artists which song they thought would win, but only French singer Catherine Ferry was willing to give a definite answer; correctly predicting the United Kingdom.

The Dutch broadcasters made the decision to use the same logo of the 1970 version held in the same country (in Amsterdam), but modified to be in black instead of the colors on the flag of the Netherlands. This logo was seen in promotions and in the introduction of the festival. This is one of the only times a Eurovision logo for the contest was used more than once.

The scoring system introduced in the previous year's competition returned in 1976. Each jury voted internally and awarded 12 points to the highest scoring song, 10 to the second highest, then 8 to the third, and then 7 to 1 (from fourth to tenth best song, according to the jury). Unlike today, the points were not given in order (from 1 up to 12), but in the order the songs were performed. The current procedure was not established until 1980 (also held in The Hague).

== Contest overview ==
The following tables reflect the officially verified scores given by each jury, adjusted after the transmission. During the live broadcast, France failed to announce the 4 points they awarded to Yugoslavia, an error overlooked by the scrutineer, Clifford Brown. Thus in the live show, Norway were placed 17th and Yugoslavia 18th. After the broadcast, the scores were adjusted and the two nations swapped places, with Yugoslavia's score being adjusted from 6 to 10 points, moving Norway down to last place.

In terms of points gained as a percentage of maximum available, the winning UK entry from Brotherhood of Man is statistically the most successful winning Eurovision entry since the introduction of the 'douze points' scoring system inaugurated in 1975. (Note: As noted on a TOTP2 Eurovision special, the 1997 Katrina and the Waves entry Love Shine a light ranks third in the rankings of points achieved as a percentage of maximum available with 227 out of 288 or 78.81%, behind Nicole's "Ein bißchen Frieden" in 1982 (161 out of 204 or 78.92%) and Brotherhood of Man's "Save Your Kisses for Me" in 1976 (164 out of 204 or 80.39%). For comparison, Elena Paparizou's 2005 win took 230 points out of a possible 456, or only 50.04% while Portugal's dominant 2017 win from Salvador Sobral took 758 points from a possible 984 available, equating to 77.04%. In the "pre-12 points" era, there was an even bigger win than Brotherhood of Man: Anne-Marie David achieved 80,6% of the votes in 1973 with "Tu te reconnaitras".)

Results of the Eurovision Song Contest 1976
R/O	Country	Artist	Song	Points	Place
1	United Kingdom	Brotherhood of Man	"Save Your Kisses for Me"	164	1
2	Switzerland	Peter, Sue and Marc	"Djambo Djambo"	91	4
3	Germany	Les Humphries Singers	"Sing, Sang, Song"	12	15
4	Israel	Chocolate, Menta, Mastik	"Emor Shalom"	77	6
5	Luxembourg	Jürgen Marcus	"Chansons pour ceux qui s'aiment"	17	14
6	Belgium	Pierre Rapsat	"Judy et Cie"	68	8
7	Ireland	Red Hurley	"When"	54	10
8	Netherlands	Sandra Reemer	"The Party Is Over Now"	56	9
9	Norway	Anne-Karine Strøm	"Mata Hari"	7	18
10	Greece	Mariza Koch	"Panaghia mou, panaghia mou"	20	13
11	Finland	Fredi and the Friends	"Pump-Pump"	44	11
12	Spain	Braulio	"Sobran las palabras"	11	16
13	Italy	Romina and Al Bano	"We'll Live It All Again"	69	7
14	Austria	Waterloo and Robinson	"My Little World"	80	5
15	Portugal	Carlos do Carmo	"Uma flor de verde pinho"	24	12
16	Monaco	Mary Christy	"Toi, la musique et moi"	93	3
17	France	Catherine Ferry	"Un, deux, trois"	147	2
18	Yugoslavia	Ambasadori	"Ne mogu skriti svoju bol"	10	17

=== Spokespersons ===
Each participating broadcaster appointed a spokesperson who was responsible for announcing the votes for its respective country via telephone. Known spokespersons at the 1976 contest are listed below.

- Belgium – André Hagon
- Finland – Erkki Vihtonen
- Luxembourg – Jacques Harvey
- Spain – José María Íñigo
- United Kingdom – Ray Moore

== Detailed voting results ==
Detailed voting results
		Total score	United Kingdom	Switzerland	Germany	Israel	Luxembourg	Belgium	Ireland	Netherlands	Norway	Greece	Finland	Spain	Italy	Austria	Portugal	Monaco	France	Yugoslavia
Contestants	United Kingdom	164		12	8	12	8	12	3	10	12	12	10	12	4	10	12	10	7	10
Contestants	Switzerland	91	12		5	4	1	7	1	6	10	2	7	4		8	7	4	6	7
Contestants	Germany	12		2			2	1						2					2	3
Contestants	Israel	77	6	7	3		7	5	4	2	7		8	1	10	6	2	1		8
Contestants	Luxembourg	17						6	6	5										
Contestants	Belgium	68	7	6		1				4	6		12		8	3	8	8	5	
Contestants	Ireland	54	10		1	3	3					8		5	12	2		6	3	1
Contestants	Netherlands	56		4	4	8	4	4	2		1	7		3	2	4	6	2		5
Contestants	Norway	7								3							4			
Contestants	Greece	20						2					4		5		1		8	
Contestants	Finland	44	2		6	6			5	1	4			6		7		7		
Contestants	Spain	11	3									1			3			3	1	
Contestants	Italy	69	1	8		2			12		3	10	6			1	10		10	6
Contestants	Austria	80	4	3	10	10	5	3	10	7	2	6	5	8				5		2
Contestants	Portugal	24					6					4	1		1				12	
Contestants	Monaco	93	5	5	7	7	12	8	8	8	5		2	7	7	5	3			4
Contestants	France	147	8	10	12	5	10	10	7	12	8	5	3	10	6	12	5	12		12
Contestants	Yugoslavia	10		1	2							3							4	

=== 12 points ===
Below is a summary of all 12 points in the final:

N.	Contestant	Nation(s) giving 12 points
7	United Kingdom	Belgium, Greece, Israel, Norway, Portugal, Spain, Switzerland
5	France	Austria, Germany, Monaco, Netherlands, Yugoslavia
1	Belgium	Finland
1	Italy	Ireland
1	Ireland	Italy
1	Monaco	Luxembourg
1	Portugal	France
1	Switzerland	United Kingdom

== Broadcasts ==
Each participating broadcaster was required to relay the contest via its networks. Non-participating EBU member broadcasters were also able to relay the contest as "passive participants". Broadcasters were able to send commentators to provide coverage of the contest in their own native language and to relay information about the artists and songs to their television viewers.

The contest was reportedly broadcast in 33 countries, including the participating countries, EBU member broadcasters in Algeria, Morocco, Iceland, Tunisia, and Turkey; in Bulgaria, Czechoslovakia, Hungary, Poland, Romania, and the Soviet Union via Intervision; and in Hong Kong, Japan, and Mexico. There were also reportedly 27 television and 17 radio commentator teams present at the contest. At least 25 radio stations from eight countries were reported to have broadcast the contest. There was an estimated global audience of 450 to 500 million television viewers and 80 million listeners.

Known details on the broadcasts in each country, including the specific broadcasting stations and commentators are shown in the tables below.

Broadcasters and commentators in participating countries
Country	Broadcaster	Channel(s)	Commentator(s)	Ref(s)
Austria	ORF	FS2	Ernst Grissemann	
Belgium	RTB	RTB	Paule Herreman	
Belgium	RTB	RTB 2		
Belgium	BRT	BRT, BRT 1	Luc Appermont	
Finland	YLE	TV1	Heikki Seppälä	
Finland	YLE	Rinnakkaisohjelma	Erkki Melakoski	
France	TF1		Jean-Claude Massoulier	
Germany	ARD	Deutsches Fernsehen	Werner Veigel	
Greece	ERT	ERT, A Programma		
Ireland	RTÉ	RTÉ	Mike Murphy	
Ireland	RTÉ	RTÉ Radio		
Israel	IBA	Israeli Television		
Italy	RAI	Rete Uno	Silvio Noto	
Luxembourg	CLT	RTL Télé-Luxembourg	Jacques Navadic	
Netherlands	NOS	Nederland 2	Willem Duys	
Netherlands	NOS	Hilversum 3		
Norway	NRK	NRK Fjernsynet	Jo Vestly	
Norway	NRK	NRK (Note: Deferred broadcast at 23:00 (CET))	Erik Heyerdahl	
Portugal	RTP	I Programa		
Spain	TVE	TVE 1	José Luis Uribarri	
Switzerland	SRG SSR	TV DRS	Theodor Haller	
Switzerland	SRG SSR	TSR	Georges Hardy	
Switzerland	SRG SSR	TSI		
Switzerland	SRG SSR	RSI 1		
United Kingdom	BBC	BBC1	Michael Aspel	
United Kingdom	BBC	BBC Radio 2 (Note: Simulcast on BBC Radio 1, BBC Radio Birmingham, BBC Radio Brighton, BBC Radio Derby, BBC Radio Humberside, BBC Radio Leicester, BBC Radio London, BBC Radio Manchester, BBC Radio Medway, BBC Radio Merseyside, BBC Radio Nottingham, BBC Radio Oxford, BBC Radio Solent, and BBC Radio Stoke.)	Terry Wogan	
United Kingdom	BFBS	BFBS Radio	Andrew Pastouna	
Yugoslavia	JRT	TV Beograd 1, TV Zagreb 1	Oliver Mlakar	
Yugoslavia	JRT	TV Koper-Capodistria		
Yugoslavia	JRT	TV Ljubljana 1		

Broadcasters and commentators in non-participating countries
Country	Broadcaster	Channel(s)	Commentator(s)	Ref(s)
Czechoslovakia	ČST	II. program (Note: Delayed broadcast in a shortened format on 19 June 1976 at 22:25 (CET))		
Denmark	DR	DR TV	Per Møller Hansen	
Hungary	MR	Petőfi Rádió (Note: Delayed broadcast in a shortened format on 8 August 1976 at 15:33 (CET))		
Iceland	RÚV	Sjónvarpið (Note: Delayed broadcast on 25 April 1976 at 20:35 (WET))	Jón Skaptason	
Jordan	JTV	JTV2 (Note: Delayed broadcast in a shortened format on 17 April 1976 at 21:10 (EET))		
Poland	TP	TP1 (Note: Deferred broadcast in a shortened format at 01:15 (CET))		
Romania	TVR	Programul 1 (Note: Delayed broadcast in a shortened format on 29 April 1976 at 21:40 (EET))		
Sweden	SR	SR P3	Ursula Richter	
Turkey	TRT	TRT Televizyon	Başak Doğru	

== See also ==
- OTI Festival 1976
