= Ireland in the Eurovision Song Contest 1976 =

- Eurovision Song Contest 1976
- Participating broadcaster: Radio Telefís Éireann (RTÉ)
- Country: Ireland
- Selection process: National Song Contest
- Selection date: 8 February 1976

Competing entry
- Song: "When"
- Artist: Red Hurley
- Songwriter: Brendan Graham

Placement
- Final result: 10th, 54 points

Participation chronology

Ireland was represented at the Eurovision Song Contest 1976 with the song "When", written by Brendan Graham, and performed by Red Hurley. The Irish participating broadcaster, Radio Telefís Éireann (RTÉ), selected its entry through a national final.

== Before Eurovision ==
=== National Song Contest ===
Radio Telefís Éireann (RTÉ) held the twelfth National Song Contest on Sunday 8 February 1976 at its studios in Dublin, hosted by Mike Murphy. Eight songs took part, with the winner chosen by voting from eight regional juries.

Other participants included past and future Irish representatives The Swarbriggs (1975 and 1977), Cathal Dunne (1979) and Linda Martin (winner in 1992) who performed as a member of the group Chips.

Final – 8 February 1976
R/O	Artist	Song	Points	Place
1	MacWilliams	"Old-Fashioned Song"	4	6
2	Cahir O'Doherty	"If I Had Your Love"	0	7
3	Mary Clifford	"Cá bhfuil Grá?"	12	3
4	The Swarbriggs	"The Way of Love"	6	5
5	Chips	"We Can Fly"	16	2
6	Red Hurley	"When"	32	1
7	Trinity	"Cé'n fáth atáim i nGrá?"	0	7
8	Cathal Dunne	"Danny"	10	4

Detailed Regional Jury Votes
R/O	Song	Clifden	Donegal	Cork	Mullingar	Dublin	Dundalk	Wexford	Limerick	Total
1	"Old-Fashioned Song"	1	1			2				4
2	"If I Had Your Love"									0
3	"Cá bhfuil Grá?"	1	4	1	2		1	3		12
4	"The Way of Love"	3						2	1	6
5	"We Can Fly"	2	2	7	2	1		2		16
6	"When"	3	3	1	6	1	9	1	8	32
7	"Cé'n fáth atáim i nGrá?"									0
8	"Danny"			1		6		2	1	10

== At Eurovision ==
On the evening of the final Hurley performed 7th in the running order, following Belgium and preceding the Netherlands. At the close of voting, "When" had picked up 54 points, placing Ireland 10th of the 18 entries. Ireland received one maximum 12 from Italy, which the Irish jury reciprocated by awarding their 12 to the Italian song.

=== Voting ===
Points awarded to Ireland
Score	Country
12 points	Italy
10 points	United Kingdom
8 points	Greece
7 points	
6 points	Monaco
5 points	Spain
4 points	
3 points	France; Israel; Luxembourg
2 points	Austria
1 point	Germany; Yugoslavia

Points awarded by Ireland
Score	Country
12 points	Italy
10 points	Austria
8 points	Monaco
7 points	France
6 points	Luxembourg
5 points	Finland
4 points	Israel
3 points	United Kingdom
2 points	Netherlands
1 point	Switzerland
