= France in the Eurovision Song Contest 1976 =

- Eurovision Song Contest 1976
- Participating broadcaster: Télévision Française 1 (TF1)
- Country: France
- Selection process: National final
- Selection date: 29 February 1976

Competing entry
- Song: "Un, deux, trois"
- Artist: Catherine Ferry
- Songwriters: Tony Rallo; Jean-Paul Cara

Placement
- Final result: 2nd, 147 points

Participation chronology

France was represented at the Eurovision Song Contest 1976 with the song "Un, deux, trois", composed by Tony Rallo, with lyrics by Jean-Paul Cara, and performed by Catherine Ferry. The French participating broadcaster, Télévision Française 1 (TF1), selected its entry through a national final.

== Before Eurovision ==
=== National final ===
Télévision Française 1 (TF1) opted to choose its 1976 entry via public selection. Two semi-finals were held, followed by the final on 29 February.

==== Semi-finals ====
Each semi-final contained seven songs, with the top three in each going forward to the final. The qualifiers were chosen by public televoting.

Semi-final 1 – 15 February 1976
R/O	Artist	Song	Televote	Place	Result
1	Christian Gaubert	"Ophélie"	2,354	6	—N/a
2	Sabrina Lory	"Pourquoi"	3,457	5	—N/a
3	Harmony 5	"Ne dis pas que tu m'aimes"	4,474	2	Qualified
4	Christopher Laird	"Vivre une page d'amour"	1,911	7	—N/a
5	Christian Borel	"Les chevaux de l'automne"	4,109	4	—N/a
6	Catherine Ferry	"Un, deux, trois"	4,776	1	Qualified
7	Caroline Verdi	"Aimer quelq'un d'heureux"	4,263	3	Qualified

Semi-final 2 – 22 February 1976
R/O	Artist	Song	Televote	Place	Result
1	Karine Day	"Ça ne fait rien"	3,639	5	—N/a
2	Isabelle Aubret	"Je te connais déjà"	3,345	6	—N/a
3	Jean Guidoni	"Marie-Valentine"	4,336	2	Qualified
4	Laurence Cartier	"Si tu penses à l'amour"	3,876	3	Qualified
5	Evelyne Geller	"Quelqu'un dans ma vie"	4,394	1	Qualified
6	Les Troubadours	"Trois petits soldats"	3,264	7	—N/a
7	Edwige	"Énergie, lumière, amour"	3,724	4	—N/a

==== Final ====
The final took place on 29 February 1976, hosted by Evelyn Leclercq, Enrico Macias and Demis Roussos. Once again, the winner was chosen by a public vote.

Final – 29 February 1976
R/O	Artist	Song	Televote	Place
1	Catherine Ferry	"Un, deux, trois"	6,348	1
2	Caroline Verdi	"Aimer quelqu'un d'heureux"	2,036	4
3	Jean Guidoni	"Marie-Valentine"	5,482	2
4	Laurence Cartier	"Si tu penses à l'amour"	1,949	5
5	Evelyne Geller	"Quelqu'un dans ma vie"	1,644	6
6	Harmony 5	"Ne dis pas que tu m'aimes"	4,014	3

== At Eurovision ==
On the night of the final Ferry performed 17th in the running order, following Monaco and preceding Yugoslavia. Prior to the contest most observers noted that the 1976 contest was the easiest for many years to predict, with "Un, deux, trois" and the United Kingdom's "Save Your Kisses for Me" as the only possible winners. The predictions proved accurate as the two quickly surged well ahead of the field in the voting, and after half the national juries had given their votes France held the lead by 82 points to the United Kingdom's 77. However the United Kingdom scored the stronger in the second half, and ran out the winner with 164 points to France's 147. However "Un, deux, trois" finished a huge 55 points ahead of third-placed Monaco. "Un, deux, trois" had picked up five maximum 12s (from Austria, Germany, Monaco, the Netherlands, and Yugoslavia) and gained the distinction of becoming the first ever non-winning Eurovision song to pick up points from every other national jury. In terms of points received as a percentage of the maximum possible total (72.06%) it remains the most successful runner-up ever under the 12 points system and outranks most subsequent winners.

The French jury awarded its 12 points to Portugal.

=== Voting ===
Points awarded to France
Score	Country
12 points	Austria; Germany; Monaco; Netherlands; Yugoslavia
10 points	Belgium; Luxembourg; Spain; Switzerland
8 points	Norway; United Kingdom
7 points	Ireland
6 points	Italy
5 points	Greece; Israel; Portugal
4 points	
3 points	Finland
2 points	
1 point	

Points awarded by France
Score	Country
12 points	Portugal
10 points	Italy
8 points	Greece
7 points	United Kingdom
6 points	Switzerland
5 points	Belgium
4 points	Yugoslavia
3 points	Ireland
2 points	Germany
1 point	Spain
