= Finland in the Eurovision Song Contest 1976 =

- Eurovision Song Contest 1976
- Participating broadcaster: Yleisradio (Yle)
- Country: Finland
- Selection process: National final
- Selection date: 31 January 1976

Competing entry
- Song: "Pump-Pump"
- Artist: Fredi and the Friends
- Songwriters: Matti Siitonen; Pertti Reponen

Placement
- Final result: 11th, 44 points

Participation chronology

Finland was represented at the Eurovision Song Contest 1976 with the song "Pump-Pump", composed by Matti Siitonen, with lyrics by Pertti Reponen, and performed by Fredi and the Friends. The Finnish participating broadcaster, Yleisradio (Yle), selected its entry through a national final.

== Before Eurovision ==
=== National final ===
Nine entries were selected for the competition from 245 received submissions. Yleisradio (Yle) held the Finnish national final on 31 January 1976 at its television studios in Helsinki, hosted by Matti Elo. The winner was chosen by regional juries. Each juror distributed their points between 1–5 points for each song.

Before the winner's performance, a protestor arrived on stage, criticising the winning entry and the commercialization of Eurovision.

Final – 31 January 1976
R/O	Artist	Song	Songwriter(s)	Points	Place
1	Anneli Sari and Deszö Balogh	"Mustalaiskaravaani"	Deszö Balogh; Tuula Valkama	353	2
2	Fredi ja Ystävät	"Pump pump"	Matti Siitonen; Vexi Salmi	380	1
3	Paula Koivuniemi and Finlandia-kvartetti	"Posket hehkuu ja haitari soi"	Matti Bergström; Pirjo Bergström	182	9
4	Mikko Alatalo Band	"Myyty mies"	Matti Laakso	306	5
5	Kirka	"Neidonryöstö"	Jukka Siikavire; Erkki Mäkinen	314	4
6	Monica Aspelund	"Joiku"	Aarno Raninen; Monica Aspelund	289	6
7	Markku Aro	"Ruska"	Martti Pohjalainen; Juha Vainio	330	3
8	Jouko, Kosti and Paavo	"Can-can"	Paul Fagerlund; Vexi Salmi	275	7
9	Inga Thommessen	"Tillsammans med barn"	Lasse Mirsch; Inga Thommessen	191	8

Scoreboard
R/O	Song	Rovaniemi	Seinäjoki	Tampere	Joensuu	Helsinki	Kouvola	Turku	Total
1	"Mustalaiskaravaani"	49	51	43	27	87	37	59	353
2	"Pump pump"	52	46	63	38	90	46	45	380
3	"Posket hehkuu ja haitari soi"	23	25	23	16	41	23	31	182
4	"Myyty mies"	31	55	56	31	49	33	51	306
5	"Neidonryöstö"	50	36	35	29	66	48	50	314
6	"Joiku"	36	38	44	29	70	35	37	289
7	"Ruska"	40	49	49	40	68	35	49	330
8	"Can-can"	40	31	46	28	50	38	42	275
9	"Tillsammans med barn"	26	28	19	20	37	31	30	191

The winning song was performed in Finnish in the national final but translated into English for Eurovision. The lyrics in English were written by Pertti Reponen. However the song title didn't change.

== At Eurovision ==
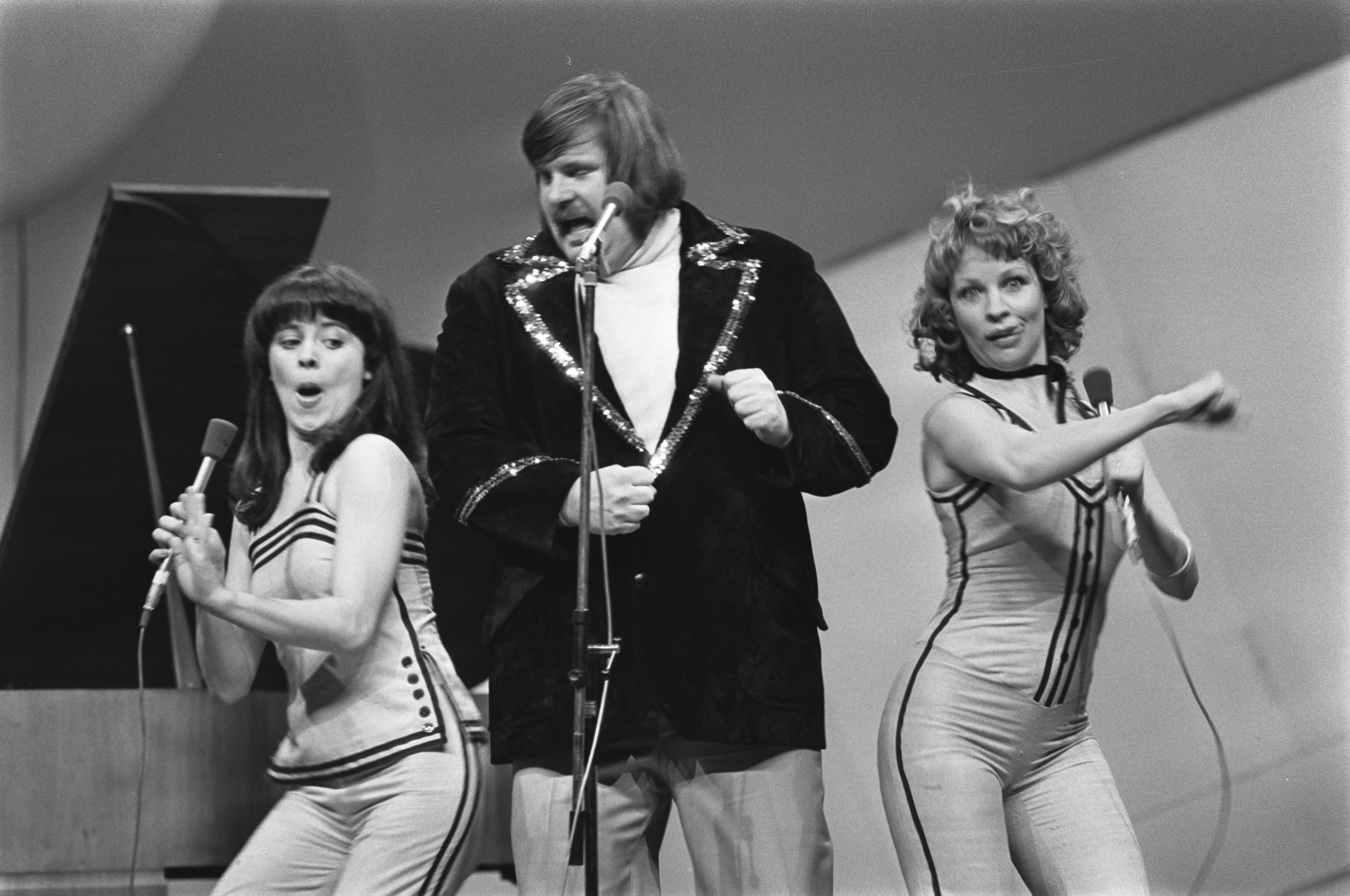
Fredi and the Friends (Titta Jokinen and Anneli Koivisto) performing "Pump-Pump" on stage

On the night of the final Fredi and the Friends performed 11th in the running order following Greece and preceding Spain. The Friends was formed by vocalists Titta Jokinen and Anneli Koivisto, backing vocalists Aimo Lehto and Irma Tapio, and a pianist and a backing vocalist Antti Hyvärinen. The performance's choreography was made by Aira Samulin. The entry was conducted by Ossi Runne. At the close of voting "Pump-Pump" had picked up 44 points, placing Finland 11th of the 18 entries.

=== Voting ===
Points awarded to Finland
Score	Country
12 points	
10 points	
8 points	
7 points	Austria; Monaco
6 points	Germany; Israel; Spain
5 points	Ireland
4 points	Norway
3 points	
2 points	United Kingdom
1 point	Netherlands

Points awarded by Finland
Score	Country
12 points	Belgium
10 points	United Kingdom
8 points	Israel
7 points	Switzerland
6 points	Italy
5 points	Austria
4 points	Greece
3 points	France
2 points	Monaco
1 point	Portugal
