= Belgium in the Eurovision Song Contest 1976 =

- Eurovision Song Contest 1976
- Participating broadcaster: Radiodiffusion-télévision belge (RTB)
- Country: Belgium
- Selection process: Avant-première Eurovision
- Selection date: 21 January 1976

Competing entry
- Song: "Judy et Cie"
- Artist: Pierre Rapsat
- Songwriters: Pierre Rapsat; Eric van Hulse

Placement
- Final result: 8th, 68 points

Participation chronology

Belgium was represented at the Eurovision Song Contest 1976 with the song "Judy et Cie", composed by Pierre Rapsat, with lyrics by Eric van Hulse, and performed by Rapsat himself. The Belgian participating broadcaster, Walloon Radiodiffusion-télévision belge (RTB), selected its entry through a national final.

== Before Eurovision ==
=== Avant-première Eurovision ===
Walloon broadcaster Radiodiffusion-télévision belge (RTB) had the turn to participate in the Eurovision Song Contest 1976 representing Belgium. Five artists were invited to the competition who then submitted one song each. As well as the eventual participants, Two Man Sound and Johan Verminnen were also invited but declined. Johan Verminnen stated that he was asked too late and was unable to find a suitable song in the short time.

The national final only lasted a total of 20 minutes. Pre-recorded performances of the five songs were aired on 21 January 1976 at 20:25 CET until 20:40 CET in a show hosted by Jacques Mercier. RTB then aired a programme about skating, and at 21:55 CET a five minute programme was aired where Henri Billen, the artistic director for RTB, announced the winning song.

Only the winner was announced, which was chosen by a jury consisting of prominent members of RTB as well as journalists and specialists who represented the public. This was controversial as some newspapers claimed that the jury was effectively a professional jury and did not represent the public. Known members of the jury are composers Frank Engelen and Willy Albimoor.

Final – 21 January 1976
R/O	Artist	Song	Songwriter(s)	Place
1	Didier Vincent	"Je viens chanter"	Didier Vincent; Jean-Paul Gréven	—N/a
2	Le Grand Frisson	"La musique"	Christian Bragard	—N/a
3	Délizia	"Monsieur, chante pour moi"	Salvatore Adamo	—N/a
4	Pierre Rapsat	"Judy et Cie"	Pierre Rapsat; Eric van Hulse	1
5	Andrée Simons	"H Coco"	Andrée Simons; Claude Lombard	—N/a

== At Eurovision ==
On the evening of the final Rapsat performed 6th in the running order, following Luxembourg and preceding Ireland. At the close of the voting "Judy et Cie" had received 68 points from 11 countries, placing Belgium 8th of the 18 competing entries. The Belgian jury awarded its 12 points to contest winners the United Kingdom.

=== Voting ===
Points awarded to Belgium
Score	Country
12 points	Finland
10 points	
8 points	Italy; Monaco; Portugal
7 points	United Kingdom
6 points	Norway; Switzerland
5 points	France
4 points	Netherlands
3 points	Austria
2 points	
1 point	Israel

Points awarded by Belgium
Score	Country
12 points	United Kingdom
10 points	France
8 points	Monaco
7 points	Switzerland
6 points	Luxembourg
5 points	Israel
4 points	Netherlands
3 points	Austria
2 points	Greece
1 point	Germany
