= Spain in the Eurovision Song Contest 1976 =

- Eurovision Song Contest 1976
- Participating broadcaster: Televisión Española (TVE)
- Country: Spain
- Selection process: Voces a 45... Hacia el Eurofestival 76
- Announcement date: 28 February 1976

Competing entry
- Song: "Sobran las palabras"
- Artist: Braulio
- Songwriter: Braulio García Bautista

Placement
- Final result: 16th, 11 points

Participation chronology

Spain was represented at the Eurovision Song Contest 1976 with the song "Sobran las palabras", written and performed by Braulio. The Spanish participating broadcaster, Televisión Española (TVE), selected its entry through a national final. The song, performed in position 12, placed sixteenth out of eighteen competing entries with 11 points.

== Before Eurovision ==
=== National selection ===
Televisión Española (TVE) held the national selection of its entry for the Eurovision Song Contest 1976 at its studios in Prado del Rey, hosted by Pilar Cañada and Jana Escribano, and aired on TVE 1. It consisted of three special shows of its regular musical program Voces a 45, specifically staged and titled for the occasion Hacia el Eurofestival 76. All the twenty-eight songs in competition were presented on 8 February 1976, were performed again on 15 February, and the final results were revealed on 28 February. Radio Nacional de España (RNE) also aired all the songs on Radio Nacional: on 9–13 February it aired six songs each day on its regular program Estudio 15-18, and on 14 February it aired all the songs in a special broadcast. Fourteen performers participated, each one with two songs, accompanied by the RTVE Light Symphony Orchestra conducted by Agustín Serrano. The winner was chosen by postal vote with a voucher printed in several weekly magazines. (Note: Each viewer could only send one vote. They had to attach a photocopy of their National Identity Card (or that of the head of the household for those under 16) to the completed voucher for the vote to be considered valid. The voucher appeared in the following weekly magazines: Diez Minutos, Garbo, ¡Hola!, La Actualidad Española, Lecturas, Personas, Pronto, Semana, Teleprograma, Teleradio, and Telva. The deadline was 22 February. Three trips for two people each to attend the Eurovision Song Contest were raffled off among the voters of the winning song.) Only the top four songs with the most votes were revealed.

Show 1 – 8 February 1976
R/O	Artist	Song
1	Miguel Ángel	"Cuando todos cantemos juntos"
2	Miguel Ángel	"Adiós María"
3	Juan Erasmo Mochi	"Ángel mío"
4	Juan Erasmo Mochi	"Vive conmigo"
5	Mike Kennedy & Los Bravos	"Dios bendiga la música"
6	Mike Kennedy & Los Bravos	"Nunca nunca nunca"
7	Don Francisco & José Luis	"Entre los pliegues de una manta"
8	Don Francisco & José Luis	"Canta y ya seremos dos"
9	Tony Landa	"Para tí"
10	Tony Landa	"Adiós"
11	Óscar Janot	"Óyeme"
12	Óscar Janot	"Ven conmigo"
13	Morena & Clara	"Tu mal comportamiento"
14	Morena & Clara	"El chico que yo más quiero"
15	Braulio	"A tí que hoy despiertas a la vida"
16	Braulio	"Sobran las palabras"
17	Myriam de Ryu	"El músico y la rosa"
18	Myriam de Ryu	"Pequeño ruiseñor"
19	Nubes Grises	"Recuerdos"
20	Nubes Grises	"Nace el sentimiento"
21	Lorenzo Santamaría	"Piensa en mí"
22	Lorenzo Santamaría	"Si tu fueras mi mujer"
23	Daniel Velázquez	"Perdóname, perdóname"
24	Daniel Velázquez	"Palabras, sólo palabras"
25	María José Prendes	"Yo soy mujer sin tí"
26	María José Prendes	"Adiós amor"
27	Eddie Santiago	"Una vez más"
28	Eddie Santiago	"Dime"

Results
Artist	Song	Place
Braulio	"Sobran las palabras"	1
Lorenzo Santamaría	"Si tu fueras mi mujer"	2
Eddie Santiago	"Una vez más"	3
Daniel Velázquez	"Perdóname, perdóname"	4

=== Controversy over voting vouchers ===
Nearly 85,000 votes were received. Controversy arose when it was discovered that some participating artists' teams had abused the voting system by collecting votes for their candidate.

=== Promotion ===
On 1 April 1976, TVE aired on TVE 1 a special program dedicated to Braulio titled Impresiones canarias, directed by Miguel Lluch, and filmed on location in the Canary Islands.

== At Eurovision ==
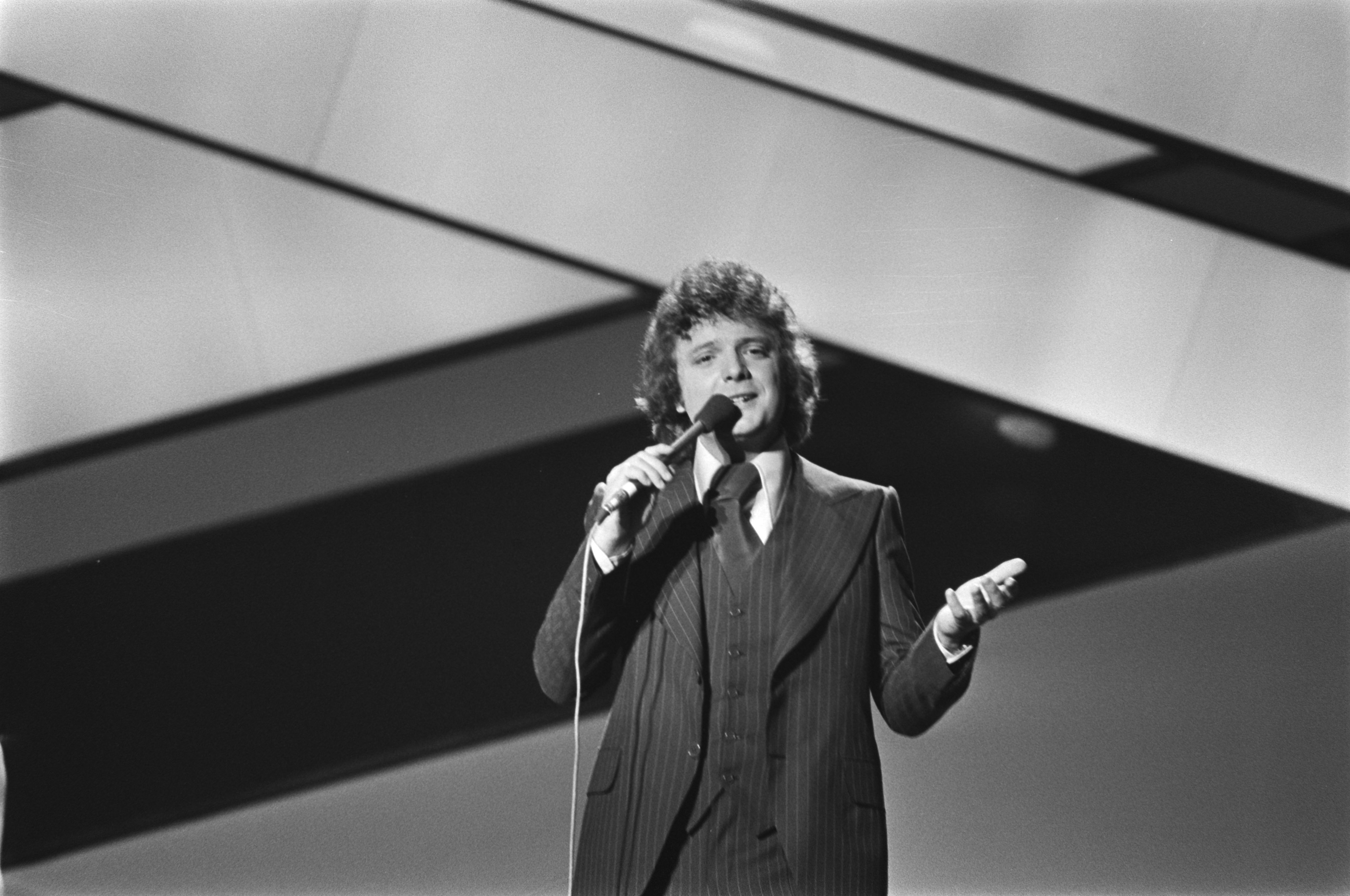
Braulio performing at Eurovision.

The Eurovision Song Contest 1976 was held on 3 April 1976 at the Nederlands Congresgebouw in The Hague, the Netherlands. Braulio performed "Sobran las palabras" twelfth in the running order, following Finland and preceding Italy. Joan Barcons conducted the event's orchestra performance of the Spanish entry. The song received 11 points, coming sixteenth in a field of eighteen.

TVE broadcast the contest in Spain on TVE 1 with commentary by José Luis Uribarri. Before the event, TVE aired a talk show hosted by José María Íñigo introducing the Spanish jury, which continued after the contest commenting on the results.

=== Voting ===
TVE assembled a jury panel with eleven members. The following members comprised the Spanish jury:

- Alfonso Lapeña – Head of Broadcasting at TVE (chairperson)
- Francisco Otero Besteiro – sculptor
- Ángel Nieto – motorcycle racer
- Javier Escrivá – actor
- Mercedes Alonso – actress
- Pilar Trenas – journalist
- Pedro Gutiérrez "El Niño de la Capea" – bullfighter
- Florentino Casanova – student
- Rita Aragón – actress
- Ana Alonso – student
- Cristina Galbó – actress

The secretary and spokesperson was José María Íñigo. The jury awarded its maximum of 12 points to the United Kingdom.

Points awarded to Spain
Score	Country
12 points	
10 points	
8 points	
7 points	
6 points	
5 points	
4 points	
3 points	Italy; Monaco; United Kingdom
2 points	
1 point	France; Greece

Points awarded by Spain
Score	Country
12 points	United Kingdom
10 points	France
8 points	Austria
7 points	Monaco
6 points	Finland
5 points	Ireland
4 points	Switzerland
3 points	Netherlands
2 points	Germany
1 point	Israel
