= United Kingdom in the Eurovision Song Contest 1976 =

- Eurovision Song Contest 1976
- Participating broadcaster: British Broadcasting Corporation (BBC)
- Country: United Kingdom
- Selection process: A Song for Europe 1976
- Selection date: 25 February 1976

Competing entry
- Song: "Save Your Kisses for Me"
- Artist: Brotherhood of Man
- Songwriters: Tony Hiller; Lee Sheriden; Martin Lee

Placement
- Final result: 1st, 164 points

Participation chronology

The United Kingdom (Note: Presented as the Great Britain.) was represented at the Eurovision Song Contest 1976 with the song "Save Your Kisses for Me", written by Tony Hiller, Lee Sheriden, and Martin Lee, and performed by Brotherhood of Man. The British participating broadcaster, the British Broadcasting Corporation (BBC), selected its entry through a national final titled A Song for Europe 1976. The entry eventually won the Eurovision Song Contest.

== Before Eurovision ==
=== A Song for Europe 1976 ===
Following the lowest published figure known for the public vote in the British national finals that used either voting by mail or telephone in 1975 and the BBC's choice of The Shadows singing all the shortlisted songs, calls from the Music Publishers Association for the songwriters and composers to be allowed to select the artist of their choice to perform the songs in future British selections for Eurovision led to an 'all-comers' final being reinstated in 1976. It was a reversion to the format used for the national finals from 1961 to 1963. Twelve songs were chosen by the Music Publisher's Association, with the songwriters choosing their own artist.

==== Final ====
The show took place on 25 February 1976 at the Royal Albert Hall in London. Michael Aspel (who had hosted the 1969 UK final) acted as presenter for the event. Fourteen regional juries voted on the songs: Bristol, Bangor, Leeds, Norwich, Newcastle, Aberdeen, Birmingham, Manchester, Belfast, Cardiff, Plymouth, Glasgow, Southampton and London. Each jury ranked the songs 1-12, awarding 12 points for their favourite down to 1 point for their least preferred. The songs were backed by the Alyn Ainsworth Orchestra. A Song for Europe was watched in 6.3 million homes (giving it a general viewing figure of 12.6 million viewers), and finishing as the 18th-most watched programme of the week. "Save Your Kisses for Me" won the national final and ultimately went on to win the Eurovision Song Contest itself. Host Michael Aspel did not name any of the jury spokespersons from the UK regions and none of them identified themselves by name, only naming the region they represented.

Frank Ifield had taken part in the A Song for Europe 1962 contest in the UK, where he'd placed second. Polly Brown became the only artist to perform two songs in a multi-artist UK national final. Apart from her solo entry, Brown was also one half of the duo 'Sweet Dreams'. With a change in line-up, 'Co-Co' would return in the A Song for Europe 1978 contest, which they would win and go on to represent the UK in the Eurovision Song Contest 1978. The band featured Cheryl Baker who ultimately won Eurovision for the United Kingdom in 1981 with Bucks Fizz. 'Sunshine' also returned two years later, also with a different line-up. Hazell Dean would return in the A Song for Europe 1984 contest.

A Song for Europe 1976 – 25 February 1976
| R/O | Artist | Song | Songwriter(s) | Points | Place |
|---|---|---|---|---|---|
| 1 | Co-Co | "Wake Up" | David Hayes; Phil Dennys (Note: Although credited in the contest to Hayes and Dennys, it was later revealed the song was written by Alan Merrill and Jake Hooker and originally recorded by the Arrows.) | 138 | 2 |
| 2 | Polly Brown | "Do You Believe in Love at First Sight?" | Ron Roker; Gerry Shury; Chris Rae; Frank McDonald | 71 | 10 |
| 3 | Brotherhood of Man | "Save Your Kisses for Me" | Tony Hiller; Lee Sheriden; Martin Lee | 140 | 1 |
| 4 | Hazell Dean | "Couldn't Live Without You" | Paul Curtis | 77 | 8 |
| 5 | Champagne | "A Love for All Seasons" | Wayne Bickerton; Tony Waddington | 77 | 8 |
| 6 | Frank Ifield | "Ain't Gonna Take No for an Answer" | Tony Craig; Eddie Adamberry | 21 | 12 |
| 7 | Sunshine | "Maria" | Rod McQueen; Eva McQueen | 80 | 7 |
| 8 | Tammy Jones | "Love's a Carousel" | Harold Spiro | 98 | 6 |
| 9 | Joey Valentine | "Going to the Movies" | Daniel Boone | 52 | 11 |
| 10 | Sweet Dreams | "Love, Kiss and Run" | Barry Blue; Stephen Worth | 109 | 4 |
| 11 | Louisa Jane White | "Take the Money and Run" | Roger Saunders; Scott English | 100 | 5 |
| 12 | Tony Christie | "Queen of the Mardi Gras" | Geoff Stephens; Tony Macaulay | 129 | 3 |

Regional jury votes
| R/O | Song | Bristol | Bangor | Leeds | Norwich | Newcastle | Aberdeen | Birmingham | Manchester | Belfast | Cardiff | Plymouth | Glasgow | Southampton | London | Total |
|---|---|---|---|---|---|---|---|---|---|---|---|---|---|---|---|---|
| 1 | "Wake Up" | 11 | 11 | 11 | 12 | 9 | 9 | 11 | 10 | 9 | 10 | 12 | 7 | 5 | 11 | 138 |
| 2 | "Do You Believe in Love at First Sight?" | 2 | 3 | 8 | 9 | 3 | 2 | 12 | 8 | 4 | 4 | 6 | 3 | 2 | 5 | 71 |
| 3 | "Save Your Kisses for Me" | 9 | 9 | 12 | 8 | 12 | 12 | 5 | 11 | 11 | 11 | 10 | 12 | 8 | 10 | 140 |
| 4 | "Couldn't Live Without You" | 3 | 4 | 4 | 6 | 2 | 8 | 10 | 6 | 8 | 7 | 4 | 5 | 7 | 3 | 77 |
| 5 | "A Love for All Seasons" | 8 | 5 | 2 | 5 | 11 | 3 | 6 | 5 | 7 | 5 | 5 | 2 | 4 | 9 | 77 |
| 6 | "Ain't Gonna Take No for an Answer" | 4 | 1 | 1 | 1 | 1 | 1 | 1 | 3 | 2 | 1 | 2 | 1 | 1 | 1 | 21 |
| 7 | "Maria" | 6 | 6 | 5 | 4 | 5 | 11 | 4 | 1 | 6 | 3 | 11 | 8 | 6 | 4 | 80 |
| 8 | "Love's a Carousel" | 1 | 12 | 10 | 7 | 7 | 10 | 2 | 4 | 10 | 9 | 7 | 4 | 9 | 6 | 98 |
| 9 | "Going to the Movies" | 5 | 10 | 3 | 2 | 4 | 6 | 3 | 2 | 3 | 2 | 1 | 6 | 3 | 2 | 52 |
| 10 | "Love, Kiss and Run" | 12 | 2 | 7 | 11 | 8 | 4 | 8 | 7 | 5 | 8 | 8 | 9 | 12 | 8 | 109 |
| 11 | "Take the Money and Run" | 7 | 8 | 6 | 3 | 10 | 5 | 9 | 9 | 1 | 6 | 9 | 10 | 10 | 7 | 100 |
| 12 | "Queen of the Mardi Gras" | 10 | 7 | 9 | 10 | 6 | 7 | 7 | 12 | 12 | 12 | 3 | 11 | 11 | 12 | 129 |
Regional jury spokespersons
Bristol – Chris Denham; Bangor – Elfyn Thomas; Leeds – Brian Baines; Norwich – John Crowest; Newcastle – Mike Neville; Aberdeen – Gerry Davis; Birmingham – Tom Coyne; Manchester – Mike Riddoch; Belfast – Michael Baguley; Cardiff – Iwan Thomas; Plymouth – Donald Heighway; Glasgow – David Findlay; Southampton – Peter Macann; London – Ray Moore

=== Chart success ===
International singing stars Dionne Warwick and Jean Terrell (former lead singer of The Supremes) both recorded and released versions of the song "Do You Believe In Love At First Sight?" despite the song's poor placing in the contest. Only the winning song reached the UK singles chart: "Save Your Kisses for Me" became a UK No.1 single, the group had a 2 further UK No.1 singles over the next 18 months. The track was the biggest selling single of 1976 in the UK and the sixth biggest selling for the 1970s in Britain, with sales well in excess of 1 million copies. Globally, the track attained sales of over 6 million, making it the biggest selling winning single in the history of the Eurovision Song Contest.

== At Eurovision ==
By scoring 164 points out of a possible maximum of 204, the UK achieved the highest relative score ever reached under the "Douze Points" voting system inaugurated in the Eurovision Song Contest 1975 and used ever since, with 80.4% of the possible score attained. No song has ever achieved this since, although previously in 1973, Luxembourg's winning entry scored 80.6% under a different voting system.

Michael Aspel provided the television commentary for the UK at the Eurovision Song Contest for BBC 1, Terry Wogan once again provided the radio commentary for BBC Radio 2 listeners and Andrew Pastouna provided commentary for British Forces Radio. The BBC appointed Ray Moore as its spokesperson to announce the British Jury results. The contest was seen by 8.85 million viewers.

=== Voting ===
Points awarded to the United Kingdom
| Score | Country |
|---|---|
| 12 points | Belgium; Greece; Israel; Norway; Portugal; Spain; Switzerland |
| 10 points | Austria; Finland; Monaco; Netherlands; Yugoslavia |
| 8 points | Germany; Luxembourg |
| 7 points | France |
| 6 points | |
| 5 points | |
| 4 points | Italy |
| 3 points | Ireland |
| 2 points | |
| 1 point | |

Points awarded by the United Kingdom
| Score | Country |
|---|---|
| 12 points | Switzerland |
| 10 points | Ireland |
| 8 points | France |
| 7 points | Belgium |
| 6 points | Israel |
| 5 points | Monaco |
| 4 points | Austria |
| 3 points | Spain |
| 2 points | Finland |
| 1 point | Italy |

== Congratulations: 50 Years of the Eurovision Song Contest ==
"Save Your Kisses for Me" was one of fourteen Eurovision songs selected by fans to compete in the Congratulations 50th anniversary special in 2005. In spite of it and another British entry ("Congratulations") being among the participating songs, as well as the presence of Katrina Leskanich (of the UK's victorious 1997 act Katrina and the Waves) as co-host, the United Kingdom did not broadcast Congratulations as they felt it wouldn't attract enough of an audience. They opted to create their own special, Boom Bang-a-Bang: 50 Years of Eurovision, hosted by 1998 host and longtime British commentator Sir Terry Wogan.

The song was drawn to appear thirteenth in the running order, following "Hold Me Now" by Johnny Logan and preceding "My Number One" by Helena Paparizou. At the end of the first round, "Save Your Kisses for Me" was announced as one of the five songs advancing to the final round. It was later revealed that the song finished fifth, scoring 154 points.

"Save Your Kisses for Me" ultimately finished fifth in the final round, scoring 230 points (including, as in 1976, a maximum 12 from Israel).

=== Voting ===
Points awarded to "Save Your Kisses for Me" (Round 1)
| Score | Country |
|---|---|
| 12 points | |
| 10 points | Poland; Portugal; Ukraine |
| 8 points | Denmark; Latvia; Russia |
| 7 points | Croatia; Norway; Turkey |
| 6 points | Austria; Israel; Lithuania; Macedonia; Monaco; Serbia and Montenegro; Slovenia; Spain |
| 5 points | Malta; Netherlands |
| 4 points | Andorra; Bosnia and Herzegovina; Cyprus |
| 3 points | Iceland |
| 2 points | Greece; Romania; Switzerland |
| 1 point | |

Points awarded to "Save Your Kisses for Me" (Round 2)
| Score | Country |
|---|---|
| 12 points | Israel |
| 10 points | Latvia; Poland; Portugal; Ukraine |
| 8 points | Austria; Denmark; Lithuania; Monaco; Netherlands; Norway; Russia; Spain |
| 7 points | Andorra; Finland; Iceland; Macedonia; Slovenia; Turkey |
| 6 points | Belgium; Bosnia and Herzegovina; Croatia; Cyprus; Germany; Greece; Ireland; Malta; Romania; Serbia and Montenegro; Sweden; Switzerland |
