= Switzerland in the Eurovision Song Contest 1976 =

- Eurovision Song Contest 1976
- Participating broadcaster: Swiss Broadcasting Corporation (SRG SSR)
- Country: Switzerland
- Selection process: Concorso eurovisione della canzone 1976
- Selection date: 14 January 1976

Competing entry
- Song: "Djambo Djambo"
- Artist: Peter, Sue and Marc
- Songwriter: Peter Reber

Placement
- Final result: 4th, 91 points

Participation chronology

Switzerland was represented at the Eurovision Song Contest 1976 with the song "Djambo Djambo", written by Peter Reber, and performed by Peter, Sue and Marc. The Swiss participating broadcaster, the Swiss Broadcasting Corporation (SRG SSR), selected its entry for the contest through a national final.

== Before Eurovision ==
=== Concorso eurovisione della canzone 1976 ===
The Swiss Broadcasting Corporation (SRG SSR) held a national final to select its entry for the Eurovision Song Contest 1976. The broadcaster received 90 total song submissions (48 in French, 27 in German, and 15 in Italian), and ultimately selected ten to take part in the selection, with five being performed in French, three in Italian, and two in German. Among the participants were Anita Traversi, who had represented Switzerland in 1960 and 1964; Henri Dès, who had represented Switzerland in 1970; and Peter, Sue and Marc, who had represented Switzerland in 1971, and would repeat this in 1979 and 1981.

Shortly before the final, "Sing mit mir" by Any Spirig, who was drawn to perform as the seventh song, was disqualified due to the artist refusing to attend the dress rehearsals as a result of constant technical errors regarding the sound quality.

Swiss Italian broadcaster Televisione svizzera di lingua italiana (TSI) staged the national final on 14 January 1976 at 21:00 (CET) at the Palazzo dei Congressi in Lugano. It was presented by Mascia Cantoni and Ezio Guidi, with Mario Robbiani conducting the orchestra. The Swingles and Lys Assia, the latter of which had won Eurovision for Switzerland in 1956 and also represented the country in 1957 and 1958, made guest appearances.

Participating entries
Broadcaster	Artist(s)	Song	Songwriter(s)		Language
Broadcaster	Artist(s)	Song	Composer	Lyricist	Language
TSR	Georgia Gibson	"Oui, c'est bien fait pour moi"	Maurice Tézé		French
TSR	Georgia Gibson	"Des lendemains"	Maurice Tézé		French
TSR	Groupe Osmose	"Polo"	Denis Favrichon		French
TSR	Michel Guex	"Musique dans les cours"	Michel Geux	Alain Portmann	French
TSR	Henri Dès	"C'est pour la vie"	Henri Dès		French
TSI	Anita Traversi	"Arrivederci"	Charles Chambertin	Anita Traversi	Italian
TSI	Anita Traversi	"La giostra gira"	Charles Chambertin	Anita Traversi	Italian
TSI	Marisa Frigerio	"Con un sorriso"	Marisa Frigerio		Italian
DRS	Peter, Sue & Marc	"Djambo Djambo"	Peter Reber		German
DRS	~~Any Spirig~~	~~"Sing mit mir"~~	~~Hans Moeckel~~	~~Hans Gmür~~	German

The voting consisted of regional public votes which were sent to the three divisions of SRG SSR (DRS, TSR, TSI: German, French and Italian speaking, respectively), a 45-member press jury, and a 14-member jury of music experts from Bern. Applications for viewers to join the regional juries were sent via postcard until 10 January, and 50 viewers from each canton cast their votes to their broadcaster divisions via phone call. The winner was the song "Djambo Djambo", written by Peter Reber, and performed by Peter, Sue and Marc, marking the trio's second appearance (of four) in the Eurovision Song Contest.

Final — 14 January 1976
R/O	Artist(s)	Song	Regional Juries			Press Jury	Expert Jury	Total	Place
R/O	Artist(s)	Song	DRS	TSR	TSI	Press Jury	Expert Jury	Total	Place
1	Georgia Gibson	"Oui, c'est bien fait pour moi"	7	7	3	5	4	26	6
2	Groupe Osmose	"Polo"	4	6	3	3	7	23	8
3	Michel Guex	"Musique dans les cours"	6	9	6	3	7	31	3
4	Anita Traversi	"Arrivederci"	2	1	1	1	2	7	9
5	Henri Dès	"C'est pour la vie"	3	5	4	7	9	28	4
6	Peter, Sue and Marc	"Djambo Djambo"	9	6	8	9	8	40	1
7	Anita Traversi	"La giostra gira"	5	4	5	4	1	19	7
8	Georgia Gibson	"Des lendemains"	4	8	7	8	6	33	2
9	Marisa Frigerio	"Con un sorriso"	8	2	9	6	3	28	4

=== Controversy ===
Following the national final it was reported that Peter, Sue and Marc had used playback in their entry in a way that did not appear to comply with the rules regarding playback, with more instruments audible than those shown onstage. The use of playback was also speculated to have played a role towards their victory, as there were technical issues regarding the sound quality which hindered the audio of the songs that were performed with the orchestra. Georgia Gibson and Henri Dès, who both participated in the national final, filed complaints to Michel Stocker, the spokesperson for Swiss participation in the Eurovision Song Contest at the time, regarding the audio issues and requesting that Peter, Sue and Marc be disqualified. Gibson, who placed second in the selection, was speculated to be the considered a replacement if the trio were disqualified.

On 6 March it was reported that Peter, Sue and Marc would not be disqualified from the contest, as the complaints against their participation only applied to the recording method of the song, not the use of playback in the selection itself.

=== Releases ===
Peter, Sue and Marc first recorded and released "Djambo Djambo" in German and later in English for its Eurovision language change in 1976. In 1998, the song was featured in a CD compilation titled "Concours Eurovision De La Chanson 1956-1998: Schweizer Beiträge", which compiled every Swiss Eurovision entry at the time.

Most of the other songs from the selection were also commercially released, with the majority being released in 1976. Henri Dès first released "C'est pour la vie" in an album the year before. Neither of Anita Traversi's songs have been commercially released.

== At Eurovision ==
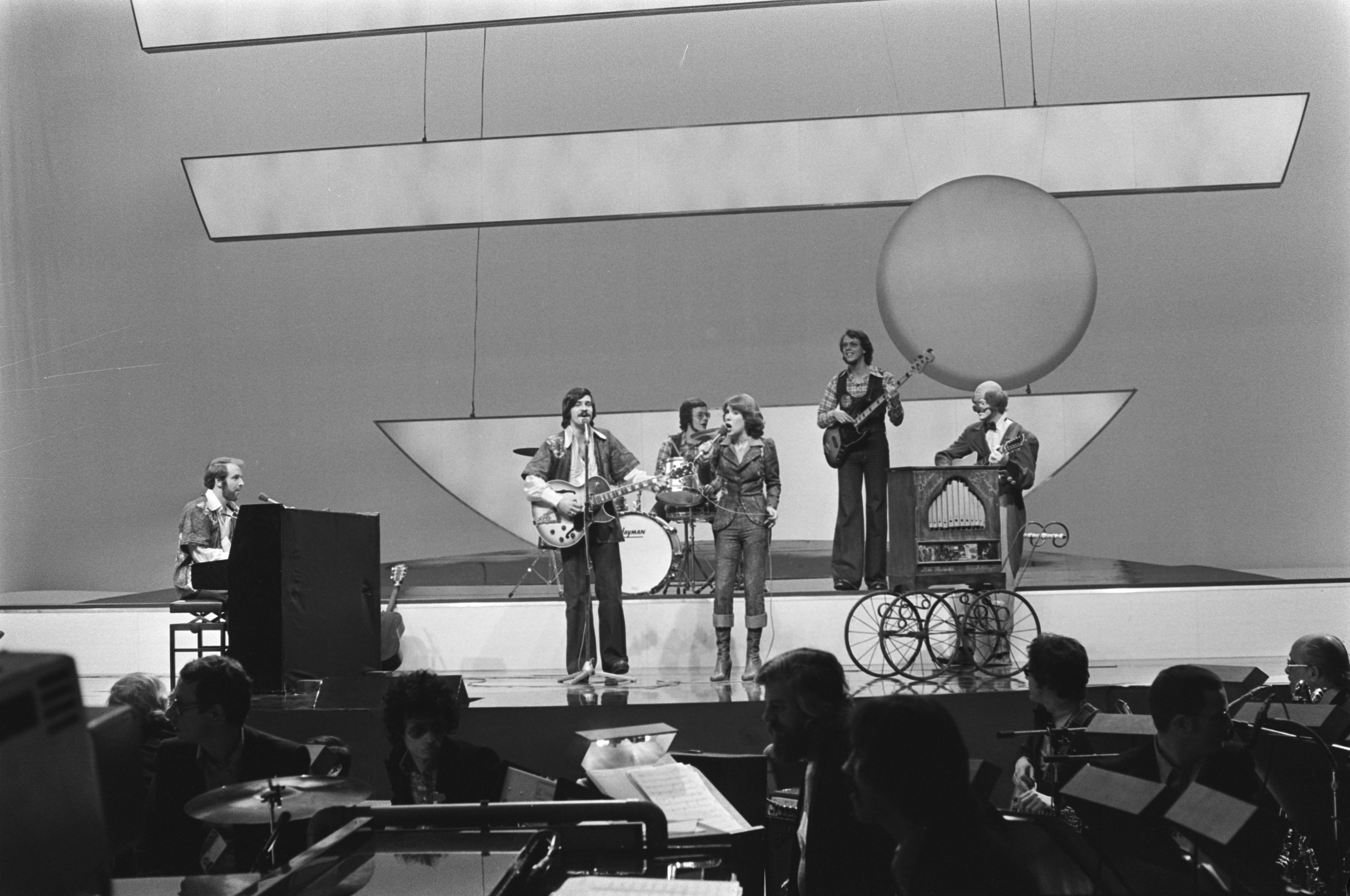
Peter, Sue and Marc in the Eurovision Song Contest 1976

At the Eurovision Song Contest 1976, held at Nederlands Congresgebouw in The Hague, the Swiss entry was the second entry of the night following the United Kingdom and preceding Germany. The Swiss conductor at the contest was Mario Robbiani, who accompanied the orchestra in the Swiss national final, as well as writing and conducting many previous Swiss entries in the contest. The Swiss entry was performed solely in English, marking the first time Switzerland performed in a non-native language in the contest. At the close of voting, Switzerland had received 91 points in total; finishing in fourth place out of eighteen countries.

The contest was broadcast on SRG SSR via TV DRS (with commentary from Theodor Haller) in German-speaking Switzerland, TSR (with commentary from Georges Hardy) in Romandy, and TSI and RSI 1 in Ticino.

=== Voting ===
Each participating broadcaster assembled a jury panel with at least eleven members. The jurors awarded 1-8, 10, and 12 points to their top ten songs. Until 1980, the votes were given in the order the awarded songs were performed in, rather than in ascending numerical order.

Points awarded to Switzerland
Score	Country
12 points	United Kingdom
10 points	Norway
8 points	Austria
7 points	Belgium; Finland; Portugal; Yugoslavia
6 points	France; Netherlands
5 points	Germany
4 points	Israel; Monaco; Spain
3 points	
2 points	Greece
1 point	Ireland; Luxembourg

Points awarded by Switzerland
Score	Country
12 points	United Kingdom
10 points	France
8 points	Italy
7 points	Israel
6 points	Belgium
5 points	Monaco
4 points	Netherlands
3 points	Austria
2 points	Germany
1 point	Yugoslavia
