= Germany in the Eurovision Song Contest 1976 =

Coordinates: 52°5′35.3″N 4°17′0.2″E

- Eurovision Song Contest 1976
- Participating broadcaster: ARD (Note: Arbeitsgemeinschaft der öffentlich-rechtlichen Rundfunkanstalten der Bundesrepublik Deutschland) – Hessischer Rundfunk (HR)
- Country: Germany
- Selection process: Ein Lied für Den Haag
- Announcement date: 18 February 1976

Competing entry
- Song: "Sing Sang Song"
- Artist: Les Humphries Singers
- Songwriters: Ralph Siegel; Kurt Hertha

Placement
- Final result: 15th, 12 points

Participation chronology

Germany was represented at the Eurovision Song Contest 1976 with the song "Sing Sang Song", composed by Ralph Siegel, with lyrics by Kurt Hertha, and performed by Les Humphries Singers. The German participating broadcaster on behalf of ARD, Hessischer Rundfunk (HR), organised the national final Ein Lied für Den Haag in order to select its entry for the contest. The national final was won by the song "Der Star" performed by Tony Marshall, but it was disqualified later. "Sing Sang Song", that originally was the runner-up, was promoted and announced as the German entry for Eurovision.

== Before Eurovision ==
=== Ein Lied für Den Haag ===
The final was held over two nights – 31 January and 1 February – at the television studios in Frankfurt, hosted by Max Schautzer. 12 songs took part with six performed on each evening, with the winner chosen by postcard voting, the results of which were announced on 18 February. "Der Star" performed by Tony Marshall was the public choice by a margin of over 20,000 votes.

Between the participants in the national selection were Ireen Sheer (who represented Germany in 1978 and Luxembourg in 1974 and 1985), Lena Valaitis (who represented Germany in 1981), and Piera Martell (who represented Switzerland 1974).

Winner

R/O	Artist	Song	Songwriter(s)	Votes	Place
1	Tina York	"Das alte Haus"	Frank Cornely	17,562	12
2	Love Generation	"Thomas Alva Edison"	Günther-Eric Thöner; Erich Offierowski	58,846	5
3	Lena Valaitis	"Du machst Karriere"	Hans-Georg Moslener; Wolfgang Mürmann	47,714	7
4	Bruce Low	"Der Jahrmarkt unserer Eitelkeit"	Horst-Heinz Henning; Christine Neuhausen	43,352	9
5	Ina Deter	"Wenn du so bist wie dein Lachen"	Ina Deter	27,903	10
6	Nina & Mike	"Komm geh mit mir"	Karl-Heinz Bardo	61,944	4
7	Maggie Mae	"Applaus für ein total verrücktes Haus"	Werner Twardy; Dieter Lieffers	71,882	3
8	Les Humphries Singers	"Sing Sang Song"	Ralph Siegel; Kurt Hertha	96,705	2
9	Ireen Sheer	"Einmal Wasser, einmal Wein"	Günther-Eric Thöner; Erich Offierowski	45,032	8
10	Meeting Point	"Es ist ein Mensch"	Wilton Kullmann	53,568	6
11	Tony Marshall	"Der Star"	Detlef Petersen	118,250	1
12	Piera Martell	"Ein neuer Tag"	Jürgen Triebel; Horst-Herbert Krause	24,525	11

=== Disqualification and replacement ===
The winning entry was disqualified later when it was discovered that it had been performed in public prior to the national final. The runner-up, "Sing Sang Song" performed by Les Humphries Singers, was therefore promoted and announced as the German entry for Eurovision.

== At Eurovision ==
On the evening of the contest, the Les Humphries Singers performed 3rd in the running order, following Switzerland and preceding Israel. At the close of voting "Sing Sang Song" had received 12 points, placing Germany 15th of the 18 entries. The German jury awarded 12 points to France.

The show was watched by 11.6 million viewers in Germany.

=== Voting ===
Points awarded to Germany
Score	Country
12 points	
10 points	
8 points	
7 points	
6 points	
5 points	
4 points	
3 points	Yugoslavia
2 points	France; Luxembourg; Spain; Switzerland
1 point	Belgium

Points awarded by Germany
Score	Country
12 points	France
10 points	Austria
8 points	United Kingdom
7 points	Monaco
6 points	Finland
5 points	Switzerland
4 points	Netherlands
3 points	Israel
2 points	Yugoslavia
1 point	Ireland
