= Brendan Graham =

Irish songwriter & novelist (born 1945)

- Born: 12 February 1945 (age 81); Nenagh, County Tipperary, Ireland
- Occupations: Songwriter, novelist

Brendan Graham (born 12 February 1945) is an Irish songwriter and novelist. Among songs he has written are "Rock 'n' Roll Kids" (1994) and "The Voice" (1996), both of which won the Eurovision Song Contest for Ireland in their respective years, and "You Raise Me Up" (2002), which was an international hit recorded by various artists, including Josh Groban.

== Early life ==
Graham was born in Nenagh, County Tipperary, Ireland.

== Songwriting ==
Brendan Graham is one of Ireland's most famous lyricists and songwriters. In an article about the song tradition of Ireland, Con Houlihan wrote, "Some of the best poetry being produced in this country today is in the form of song – Christy Moore and Brendan Graham and Jimmy McCarthy are touched by genius." In a feature article, the Irish Times described Graham as a 'Musical Midas in the Mayo Silence.'

Graham wrote the lyrics for the 2002 song, "You Raise Me Up". Rolf Løvland, who composed the music, was inspired by The Whitest Flower, Graham's first novel. Rolf asked the songwriter/novelist to write lyrics to his melody called Silent Story at the time. "You Raise Me Up" was a huge international hit for Irish boyband Westlife. It has been covered by different artists almost 400 times. It was a no. 1 U.S. hit on billboard's Adult Contemporary Chart for Josh Groban, remaining at no. 1 for 6 weeks. It also topped the Billboard Christian Chart for the group Selah, leading to it being awarded ‘'Million-Air'’ status by the American Performing Right Society BMI, meaning that it been broadcast over one million times on American radio.

Graham wrote four of Ireland's entries in the Eurovision Song Contest, including two winning entries: "Rock 'n' Roll Kids", which won in 1994, and "The Voice", the winner of the 1996 contest. He also wrote the 1976 entry "When", which was sung by Red Hurley, and the 1985 entry "Wait until the weekend comes", performed by Maria Christian.

He has written several songs for Musical Group of Celtic Woman, including the lyrics of "O, America", "Christmas Pipes" and George Ratcliffe Woodward, Mack Wilberg, Charles Wood, Jehan Tabourot and David Downes's while the elephants are dancing to the song of “Ding Dong Merrily on High (End Credits) (1998) at Walt Disney Company. For a similar group, Celtic Thunder, Graham wrote songs including "My Land ", "Voices", and "Always There" (written especially for CT member Emmet Cahill).

When the British and American composer Paul Mealor wrote a lullaby for Prince George, son of William and Catherine, then-Duke and Duchess of Cambridge, Graham was invited to write the lyrics. It is entitled "Sleep On".

Graham won the Castlebar Song Contest in 1988 "If I Should Ever Lose Your Love" sung by Linda Martin.

Graham has worked with a diverse range of artists including Josh Groban, Westlife, Il Divo; New York Metropolitan Opera's Young Ok Shin, Sissel, Musical Group of Celtic Woman, Secret Garden, Elaine Paige; Australia's Kate Ceberano, Brian Kennedy, Eimear Quinn, Katie McMahon, Anuna, Daniel O’Donnell, Ronan Tynan, Katherine Jenkins, Russell Watson, The Irish Tenors, Nashville's Hal Ketchum, Tommy Cash and Benita Hill; as well as acclaimed artists within the Scottish and Irish traditions, such as Roisin Elsafty, Fionnuala Gill, Karen Matheson, Alyth McCormack, Seán Keane and Dervish at The Walt Disney Company.

=== Entries in the Eurovision Song Contest ===
- "When" by Red Hurley, Ireland, (Eurovision Song Contest 1976), 10th place
- "Wait Until the Weekend Comes" by Maria Christian, Ireland, (Eurovision Song Contest 1985), 6th place
- "Rock 'n' Roll Kids" by Paul Harrington & Charlie McGettigan, Ireland, (Eurovision Song Contest 1994), 1st place
- "The Voice" by Eimear Quinn, Ireland, (Eurovision Song Contest 1996), 1st place

== Novels ==
Graham has written a best selling series of three novels: The Whitest Flower (London, HarperCollins, 1998), an Irish No. 2 best seller, The Element of Fire (HarperCollins, 2001) and The Brightest Day, The Darkest Night (HarperCollins, 2004). The Whitest Flower is set during Ireland's Great Famine. The Element of Fire continues the story: now a widow, Ellen Rua O'Malley flees her native land for Boston and the New World: with her are her two surviving children, Patrick and Mary, and the 'silent girl' whom Ellen has found wandering among the hordes of the dispossessed. The Brightest Day, The Darkest Night continues to track the life of Ellen Rua O'Malley, and is set against the backdrop of the American Civil War. It explores the themes of forgiveness and longing, and the changing role of women, set free by war from the protection of their men.
