= Luxembourg in the Eurovision Song Contest 1976 =

- Eurovision Song Contest 1976
- Participating broadcaster: Compagnie Luxembourgeoise de Télédiffusion (CLT)
- Country: Luxembourg
- Selection process: National final
- Announcement date: 21 February 1976

Competing entry
- Song: "Chansons pour ceux qui s'aiment"
- Artist: Jürgen Marcus
- Songwriters: Jack White; Fred Jay; Vline Buggy

Placement
- Final result: 14th, 17 points

Participation chronology

Luxembourg was represented at the Eurovision Song Contest 1976 with the song "Chansons pour ceux qui s'aiment", composed by Jack White, with lyrics by Fred Jay and Vline Buggy, and performed by Jürgen Marcus. The Luxembourgish participating broadcaster, the Compagnie Luxembourgeoise de Télédiffusion (CLT), selected its entry through a national final. Marcus was the first German singer to represent Luxembourg, as their 1974 representative Ireen Sheer, although German-based, was British by birth.

== Before Eurovision ==
=== Sélection Nationale pour le Concours Eurovision de la Chanson 1976 ===
A national final featuring five acts was organised by the Compagnie Luxembourgeoise de Télédiffusion (CLT) to select its entry for the Eurovision Song Contest 1976. Video recordings of the five competing entries, filmed on 5 February 1976 at its studios in Villa Louvigny, were presented on 14 February 1976 and the public was able to vote for their favourite song through postcard voting until 19 February 1976. The winner, "Chansons pour ceux qui s'aiment" performed by Jürgen Marcus, was selected following the 50/50 combination of votes from an eight-member jury and the results of around 2,000 postcards submitted by the public, and was announced during a special broadcast on 21 February 1976. The jury consisted of French, German, English, and Luxembourgish-speaking presenters of Radio Luxembourg: André Torrent, Sam Bernett, Helga Guitton, Jochen Pützenbacher, Barry Alldis, Stuart Henry, Jeannine Theisen, and Raymond Tholl.

Final – 21 February 1976
R/O	Artist	Song	Songwriter(s)	Place
1	Best Wishes	"Brasilo, Brasila"	Kurt Hertha; Franck Gérald; Ralph Siegel	2
2	Jürgen Marcus	"Chansons pour ceux qui s'aiment"	Jack White; Fred Jay; Vline Buggy	1
3	Marianne Rosenberg	"Tout peut arriver au cinéma"	Christian Heilburg; Joachim Heider	3
4	Il était une fois	"Tu sais quel amour est une fleur"	Richard Dewitte; Serge Koolenn	4
5	Gianni Nazzaro	"Un jour l'amour viendra"	Jean-Max Riviere; D. Barbelivien; G. Giannotti	5

== At Eurovision ==
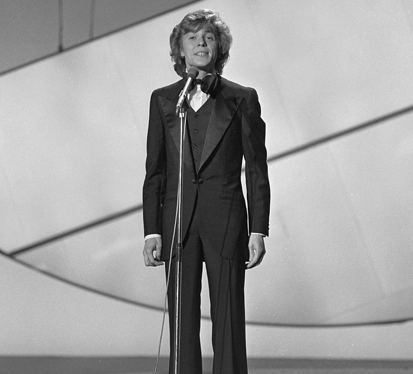
Marcus during Eurovision rehearsals

On the evening of the final Marcus performed 5th in the running order, following Israel and preceding Belgium, and conducted by Jo Plée. At the close of voting "Chansons pour ceux qui s'aiment" had picked up 17 points, placing Luxembourg 14th of the 18 entries. The Luxembourgish jury awarded its 12 points to Monaco.

=== Voting ===
Points awarded to Luxembourg
Score	Country
12 points	
10 points	
8 points	
7 points	
6 points	Belgium; Ireland
5 points	Netherlands
4 points	
3 points	
2 points	
1 point	

Points awarded by Luxembourg
Score	Country
12 points	Monaco
10 points	France
8 points	United Kingdom
7 points	Israel
6 points	Portugal
5 points	Austria
4 points	Netherlands
3 points	Ireland
2 points	Germany
1 point	Switzerland
