= Fredi (singer) =

Finnish singer (1942–2021)

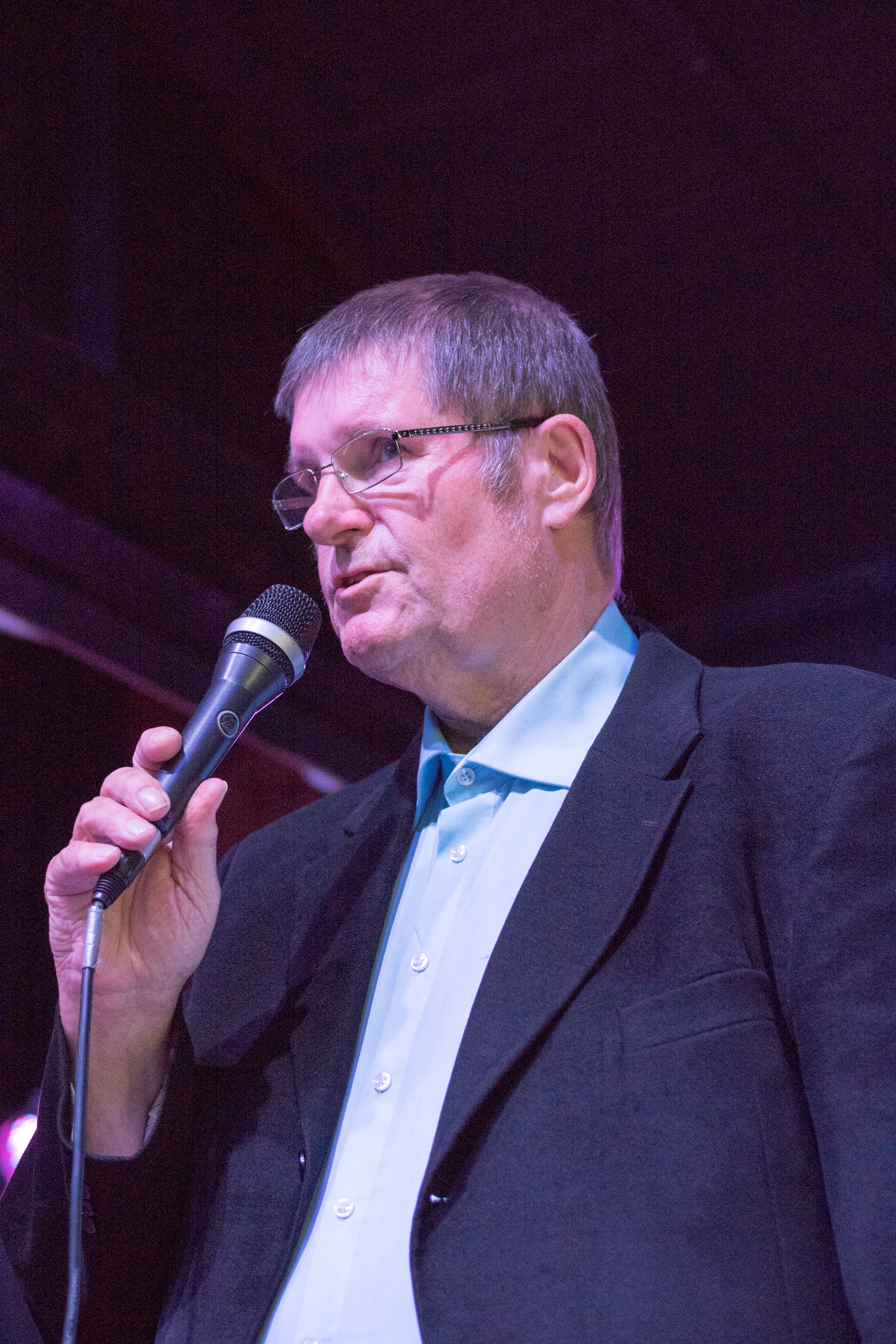
Fredi in 2014

Matti Kalevi Siitonen (23 July 1942 – 23 April 2021), known professionally as Fredi, was a Finnish comedic actor, musician, singer/songwriter and television presenter. Domestically he was best known as a founding member of the comedic variety ensemble Kivikasvot.

== Career ==
Fredi was born in Mikkeli. In 1965 he recorded his first song, "Roskisdyykkarin Balladi" as Folk Fredi. A year later he dropped the Folk name and was simply known as Fredi. Internationally he represented his country at the Eurovision Song Contest 1967 in Vienna, Austria with the song "Varjoon - suojaan" ("Into the shadow--into shelter"), which received three points and finished 12th out of 17. Fredi returned to Eurovision in 1976 at The Hague, Netherlands, with the group Fredi & Friends. Their song "Pump-Pump" received 44 points, finishing 11th out of 18.

In Finland Fredi had more than 20 Top 10 hit singles, and achieved diamond status with many studio albums like Avaa sydämesi mulle (Open Your Heart to Me) and Rakkauslauluja (Lovesongs). In 1968, he recorded Finnish cover versions of Tom Jones's "Delilah" and Procol Harum's "Whiter Shade of Pale" and five years later, David Bowie's "Starman" and Elton John's "Goodbye Yellow Brick Road". In 1977, he released his first Christmas album, containing covers of "Silent Night" and "White Christmas". In 1978 he released one of his most critically acclaimed albums Tänään Fredi (Today, Fredi). It contained hit singles "Syntinen yö" ("The sinful night"), and Finnish covers of the Bee Gees' Stayin' Alive ("Elää mä sain") and Space's "Magic Fly" ("Se outoa on"). The album peaked at #5 in the Finnish Albums Chart and was certified gold. Fredi sold over 177,000 certified records, which places him among the 50 best-selling male soloists in Finland.

In 2010, Fredi started presenting his own talk show, "Fredin Vieraana" ("Fredi's guests.") His shows included songs at the opening and closing of each episode, and interviews with Finnish musicians and singers such as Katri Helena and Titta Jokinen.

== Personal life and death ==
Fredi was the husband of the former mayor of Helsinki, Eva-Riitta Siitonen. They were married in 1969 and on 13 November 1970, Eva-Riitta gave birth to the late Hanna-Riikka Siitonen, who was a singer and actress. Fredi was also the stepfather of Petri, Eva-Riitta's son from a previous relationship.

Fredi died on 23 April 2021, at the age of 78.

== Discography ==
- 1969 – Fredi (Gold)
- 1972 – Niin paljon kuuluu rakkauteen (Diamond)
- 1973 – Rakkauden Sinfonia (Gold)
- 1974 – Avaa sydämesi mulle (Diamond)
- 1975 – Rakkauslauluja (Diamond)
- 1976 – Laula Kanssain (Gold)
- 1978 – Tänään Fredi (Gold)
- 1980 – Elämä on ihanaa

Preceded by Ann-Christine with Playboy	Finland in the Eurovision Song Contest; 1967	Succeeded by Kristina Hautala with Kun kello käy
Preceded by Pihasoittajat with Old Man Fiddle	Finland in the Eurovision Song Contest; 1976	Succeeded by Monica Aspelund with Lapponia
