= Pierre Rapsat =

Belgian singer-songwriter

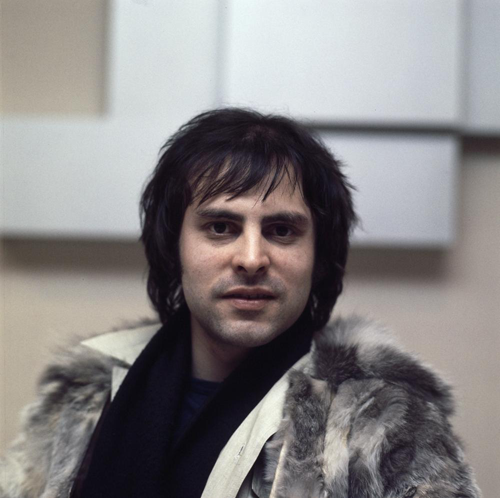
- Pierre Rapsat in 1976

Background information
- Born: Pierre Raepsaet; 28 May 1948; Brussels, Belgium
- Died: 20 April 2002 (aged 53) Verviers, Belgium
- Genres: Pop
- Occupation: Singer-songwriter

Pierre Rapsat (born Pierre Raepsaet, 28 May 1948 – 20 April 2002) was a Belgian singer-songwriter who had a very successful career in his homeland and also spells of popularity in other Francophone countries. Outside these areas, he is best known for his participation in the 1976 Eurovision Song Contest.

== Early life and career ==
Rapsat was born in the Ixelles municipality of Brussels to a Flemish father and a mother of Asturian descent. His father spent two years in the Dachau concentration camp, and his mother fled her country during the civil war. When Rapsat was 10 years old the family moved to Verviers, which remained his home for the rest of his life.

Pierre Rapsat began writing songs at the age of 13, influenced by British pop music, including The Beatles and The Rolling Stones, as well as French chanson, particularly the works of Léo Ferré and Georges Brassens. He also acquired his first guitar at that age. By 18, he had decided to pursue a career in music, focusing on songwriting and composition.

In the early stages of his career, Rapsat performed with various dance orchestras and musical groups. In 1970, he founded his first band, Laurélie, which released one album before disbanding. He subsequently joined the Brussels-based group Jenghiz Khan and recorded the album Welt Cult. The group also disbanded shortly thereafter.

Following these experiences, Rapsat chose to pursue a solo career in 1973. His musical style was eclectic, ranging from rock to chanson, but at this stage earned him little success.

== Eurovision Song Contest ==
In 1976 Rapsat's self-composed song "Judy et Cie" ("Judy and Co.") was chosen as the Belgian entry for the twenty first Eurovision Song Contest, which took place on 3 April in The Hague. With its haunting melody and melancholy lyrics, it was an unusual and atypical song for Eurovision at that time. In a strong field, it finished the evening in eighth place out of 18 entries, and is often cited by Eurovision fans as being among Belgium's best.

== Later career ==
Rapsat's first major success post-Eurovision came in 1982 with the album Lâchez les fauves which sold 30,000 copies in Wallonia. The albums Ligne claire (1984) and J'aime ça (1986) also sold well, and marked Rapsat's first success in the French market. He continued to release albums to critical acclaim in Belgium throughout the 1990s, although during this period his French success abated. It was not until the release of Dazibao in 2001 that he broke out of the Belgian market once again to enjoy widespread success and acclaim in other Francophone countries. Dazibao marked a major comeback for Rapsat in France and was also very popular in Switzerland and Luxembourg.

== Death ==
In 2001 Rapsat was diagnosed with cancer and was forced to cut down on live appearances while he underwent chemotherapy. He made his final live appearance at a concert in Ath on 1 March 2002. Rapsat died at his home in Verviers on 20 April 2002, aged 53.

== Tribute ==
In 2002, the Prix Québec/Wallonie-Bruxelles, established in 1984, was renamed the Rapsat-Lelièvre Prize in tribute to Pierre Rapsat and Sylvain Lelièvre, a Québécois singer and poet. The two artists, both highly regarded in the Francophone world, died within days of each other. Rapsat had been the first recipient of the award in 1984.

In 2005 the Belgian television channel RTBF broadcast a show called Le plus grand Belge (The Greatest Belgian) in which viewers were invited to cast their vote by Internet, SMS or telephone. Rapsat was voted into 51st place.

To mark the 10th anniversary of the death of Rapsat, artists were invited to perform one of his songs during the 2012 edition of the Les Francofolies de Spa festival.

In 2022, marking the twentieth anniversary of his death, Pierre Rapsat was posthumously awarded the Knight's Medal of the Order of La Pléiade in Spa, as well as the title of Commander of the Walloon Order of Merit.

The municipal school of Stembert (Verviers) was named "Pierre Rapsat" in his honor.

== Discography ==
1973 – New York (in English)
1. Introduction (No dreams allowed)
2. Natural Daisy
3. Music man
4. Subway bats
5. Dreams allowed
6. Sammy the bee
7. Cool roses
8. Lookin' up the sky
9. New-York (Foundation)
10. New-York (Civilisation)

1973 – New York (in French)
1. Introduction (Voyage)
2. Jonquille
3. Music man
4. La clé
5. Le géant
6. Bon appétit
7. Trois roses froides
8. Sans histoire
9. New-York (Fondation)
10. New-York (Civilisation)

1975 – Musicolor (in English)
1. Week Day Lament
2. The Man who Laughed at Death
3. Shadow and the Light
4. Dreamer
5. Just a Day in a Town in Wales
6. Speedway
7. Magical Fish
8. Rapsatus Vulgaris (showman)
9. Buster Keaton
10. Musicolor Holiday

1975 – Musicolor (in French)
1. Faut pas grand-chose pour être heureux
2. Un jour, les couleurs
3. L'ombre et la lumière
4. Djumbo, l'averick
5. Chanson à ma femme
6. Musicolor
7. Adieu, les clowns !
8. Le brochet
9. Rapsatus vulgaris
10. Buster Keaton

1976 – Judy et Cie
1. Judy et cie
2. Sammy the Bee
3. Djumbo l'averick
4. Buster Keaton
5. Trois roses froides
6. Harold et Maude
7. Music Man
8. Rien qu'une vie
9. Faut pas grand-chose pour être heureux
10. Doc Holyday
11. New York (fondation)
12. New York (civilisation)

1977 – Je suis moi
1. L'oiseau de malheur
2. Les artistes d'eau douce
3. Les chauves-souris du métro
4. L'enfant du 92e
5. Les machines
6. Gauguin
7. Les canaux de Mars
8. Nous les Beatles
9. Qu'on est bien
10. Je suis moi

1978 – Gémeaux
1. Gémeaux
2. Poupée mécanique
3. Soleil
4. Cinémathèque
5. Qui ?
6. Country boy
7. Tout ça
8. Les mots
9. Avanti la musica ! (Les notes)
10. 34 tours

1979 – 1980
1. 1980
2. Quarante degrés
3. Paul cow-boy
4. Délire animé
5. Casseurs de raison
6. Vie en scope
7. S.O.S. (Tu prends ton téléphone)
8. À projeter
9. Transplanet express
10. Epilogue

1980 – Donner tout son cœur
1. Donner tout son cœur
2. Où vas-tu tous les soirs ?
3. 'Tention les yeux
4. Pas d'électricité
5. Musique sans paroles
6. Bizarre hostile
7. T'as pas été sympa
8. Brouillard
9. Time is not Money

1981 – Un coup de rouge, un coup de blues
1. Un coup de rouge, un coup de blues
2. Mais où est passé le Président Rosko ?!
3. C'est parfois l'eldorado
4. Luna-park
5. Emmène-moi
6. La revanche
7. Radio Hara-Kiri
8. Chevauchée fantastique
9. Flash-back (c'est dimanche)
10. John

1982 – Seul dans la métropole (compilation)
1. Seul dans la métropole
2. Bizarre hostile
3. Un coup de rouge, un coup de blues
4. Donner tout son cœur
5. 1980
6. Je suis moi
7. L'enfant du 92e
8. Paul cow-boy
9. La revanche
10. Tention les yeux

1982 – Lâchez les fauves
1. Passagers de la nuit
2. Lâchez les fauves
3. Courir jusqu'au bout de la rue
4. Sujets tabou
5. La ballade du globe-trotter
6. C'est toujours un mystère
7. Visage
8. Cover girl, quel est ton nom
9. Année lumière

1984 – Ligne claire
1. Illusions
2. C'était un ange noir
3. Animal
4. Mutant
5. Immortel
6. Elle m'appelle
7. Décalage horaire
8. Comme un vieux slow
9. Joan joue aux dominos
10. Silence d'or

1986 – J'aime ça
1. Nouveau monde
2. Où es-tu Julian
3. Douce Guérilla
4. Une sensation
5. Les jours melancos
6. Ecris ton nom
7. Galerie des pas perdus
8. Histoire d'eau
9. Parce qu'un jour

1988 – Haut les mains
1. Soleil noir
2. Que tout recommence
3. C'est un secret
4. Locomotive, la téquila coulera pour toi
5. Happy end
6. Sans retour
7. Dans les lignes de la main
8. Belladone
9. Ton cœur bat

1989 – J'ouvre les yeux
1. J'ouvre les yeux
2. Lorelei 1990
3. Cœur d'ange, t'as rendez-vous avec le diable
4. Ushuaïa, droit vers le soleil
5. Singapore Sling
6. Où tu veux, quand tu veux
7. Quelque chose a changé
8. Le cri de la ville
9. La légende d'Hiva Oa
10. L'éclat de Véga

1991 – J'ai besoin de nous (compilation)
1. L'enfant du 92e (nouvelle version)
2. Cover girl, quel est ton nom
3. Gémeaux
4. Où es-tu Julian
5. Elle m'appelle
6. Les artistes d'eau douce (nouvelle version)
7. Passagers de la nuit
8. Noï
9. C'est un secret
10. New-York (nouvelle version)
11. Judy et Cie
12. Animal
13. Soleil noir
14. C'est toujours un mystère
15. Illusions
16. Écris ton nom
17. Que tout recommence
18. J'ai besoin de nous (inédit)

1992 – Brasero
1. Comme un brasero
2. Je joue encore
3. Feu sacré
4. Goodbye Mr Fender
5. L'évanescente Vanessa
6. Julian est revenu
7. Jeux dangereux
8. Aurore
9. Salut visage pâle
10. L'effet boomerang
11. Parking man

1995 – Pierre Rapsat
1. À l'aube d'un millénaire
2. Blue note dans l'univers
3. En baskets et la boule à Z
4. Comment cesse-t-on d'aimer ?
5. Marie-Joana
6. À l'envers c'est l'endroit (que je préfère)
7. Elle se cache les seins
8. L'accordéon cajun
9. Le jour se lève
10. Mpeg2 le nouveau pouvoir
11. Outsider
12. La dernière chanson

1997 – En concert : Passager d'un soir
1. Blue note dans l'univers
2. Elle m'appelle
3. Comme un brasero
4. Aurore
5. Passager de la nuit
6. Le jour se lève
7. Illusions
8. Marie-Joana
9. En baskets et la boule à Z
10. Où es-tu Julian ?
11. À l'envers c'est l'endroit
12. Les machines
13. New York
14. Soleil noir
15. Ecris ton nom
16. Un dimanche en automne

1998 – Volte-Face
1. J'attends le soleil
2. Mensonge
3. Pile ou face
4. Viva Maria
5. Si les femmes
6. Nouvelle Oasis
7. Fragile
8. Une belle journée ...
9. Le brochet
10. Lucifer
11. Me glisser dans tes rêves
12. Jamais été alone

2001 – Dazibao
1. Les rêves sont en nous
2. Adeu
3. Ensemble (intro)
4. Ensemble
5. Jardin secret
6. Sitcom
7. On existe encore
8. Un cœur qui se bat
9. Chacun pour soi
10. Rien qu'une chanson
11. Tout le monde veut y croire
12. Dazibao

2002 – Tous les rêves

Disс 1

1. C'est toujours un mystère
2. Où es-tu Julian?
3. Adeu
4. Judy et cie
5. Un cœur qui se bat
6. Illusions
7. Chacun pour soi
8. Passagers de la nuit
9. Jardin secret
10. Joan joue aux dominos
11. On existe encore
12. Blue note dans l'univers
13. Si les femmes

Disс 2

1. Dazibao
2. Aurore
3. Pile ou face
4. J'attends le soleil
5. Elle m'appelle
6. Animal
7. Soleil noir
8. L'enfant du 92e
9. Ensemble (intro)
10. Ensemble
11. Les rêves sont en nous
12. Rien qu'une chanson (duo avec Lio)

2003 – Tous les rêves (DVD)
1. C'est toujours un mystère
2. Où es-tu Julian
3. Adeu
4. Judy & cie
5. Un cœur qui se bat
6. Illusions
7. Chacun pour soi
8. Passagers de la nuit
9. Jardin secret
10. Joan joue aux dominos
11. On existe encore
12. Blue note dans l'univers
13. Si les femmes
14. Dazibao
15. Aurore
16. Pile ou face
17. J'attends le soleil
18. Elle m'appelle
19. Animal
20. Soleil noir
21. L'enfant du 92e
22. Ensemble
23. Les rêves sont en nous

2003 – Saisons (anthology, volume 1)

Disс 1

1. Les saisons (inédit)
2. Nos esprits se mélangent (inédit)
3. Qu'il est difficile de se dire je t'aime (inédit)
4. Ensemble
5. Tout le monde veut y croire (duo avec Lio)
6. Adeu
7. Les Rêves sont en nous
8. Judy & Cie
9. Rien qu'une chanson
10. Pile ou face
11. J'attends le soleil
12. Blue note dans l'univers
13. Comment cesse-t-on d'aimer?
14. Comme un brasero
15. Goodbye Mr Fender
16. Aurore
17. La légende d'Hiva Oa
18. New-York

Disс 2

1. Un dimanche en automne
2. J'ai besoin de nous
3. Passagers de la nuit
4. Elle m'appelle
5. Illusions
6. C'est toujours un mystère
7. Lâchez les fauves
8. Je suis moi
9. Animal
10. L'enfant du 92e
11. Gémeaux
12. Où es-tu Julian
13. Les artistes d'eau douce
14. Ecris ton nom
15. Un coup de rouge, un coup de blues
16. 1980
17. Bizarre hostile
18. John

2004 – Jardin secret, (anthology, volume 2)

Disque 1

1. Cover girl
2. Si les femmes
3. Un cœur qui se bat
4. À l'envers radio remix
5. Joan joue aux dominos
6. Seul dans la métropole
7. La dernière chanson
8. Année-lumière
9. Les machines
10. Donner tout son cœur
11. Silence d'or
12. Me glisser dans tes rêves
13. J'ouvre les yeux
14. Sujet tabou
15. Belladone
16. Visage
17. J'ai perdu l'Amérique

Disque 2

1. Soleil Noir
2. Je joue encore
3. Jardin secret
4. C'est un secret
5. Noï
6. La revanche
7. Lâchez les fauves
8. Que tout recommence
9. Le jour se lève
10. Attention les yeux
11. Immortel
12. Fragile
13. Où tu veux, quand tu veux
14. Le plat pays
15. Brouillard (Live à Verviers 1982)
16. Time is not Money (Live à Verviers 1982)

Preceded by Ann Christy with "Gelukkig zijn"	Belgium in the Eurovision Song Contest; 1976	Succeeded by Dream Express with "A Million in One, Two, Three"
