= Jürgen Marcus =

German singer (1948–2018)

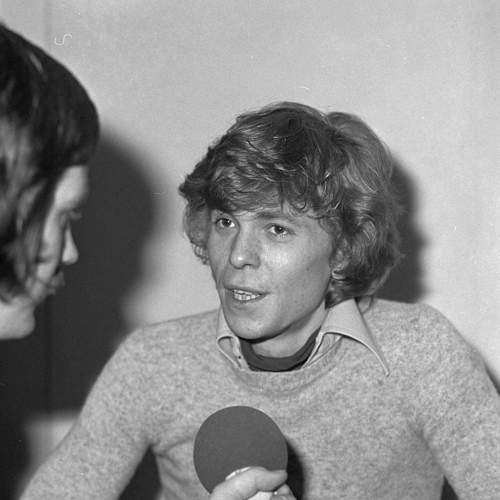
- Marcus in 1976

Background information
- Born: Jürgen Beumer; 6 June 1948; Herne, Allied-occupied Germany
- Died: 17 May 2018 (aged 69) Munich, Germany
- Genres: Pop; Schlager
- Occupation: Singer
- Years active: 1970–2017
- Label: Telefunken

Jürgen Marcus (born Jürgen Beumer; 6 June 1948 – 17 May 2018) was a German schlager singer who was most successful during the 1970s, when he had 14 chart hits in Germany. He is also known for his participation on behalf of Luxembourg in the 1976 Eurovision Song Contest.

== Career ==
Marcus was signed to a recording contract in 1970 and his single releases became popular almost immediately. His first charting single came in the same year, and he subsequently enjoyed three consecutive top 10 hits in 1972–73, including the highest-charting single of his career, "Eine neue Liebe ist wie ein neues Leben", which peaked at No. 2. He was a regular on German TV music shows, and in 1972 appeared in a film, Heut hau'n wir auf die Pauke.

== Eurovision Song Contest ==
In 1975, Marcus took part in the German Eurovision selection with the song "Ein Lied zieht hinaus in die Welt". Although the song only managed to place ninth, it went on to become a top 3 hit and the last top 20 entry of his career.

Luxembourgian broadcaster RTL almost invariably chose their Eurovision entry by internal selection. Unusually in 1976, however, they organised a five-song final in which Marcus participated with "Chansons pour ceux qui s'aiment" ("Songs For Those Who Love Each Other"). He won the selection, so went forward to the 21st Eurovision Song Contest which was held on 3 April in The Hague, where "Chansons pour ceux qui s'aiment" fared less well than expected, placing 14th of the 18 entries.

== Later career ==
By the later 1970s, Marcus' recording success had declined and he parted ways with his record company in 1979. Following a last minor hit in 1981, plans and collaborations came to nothing and Marcus largely dropped from sight. His first album for over 20 years (Ich glaub an die Welt) was released in 2004, followed by a Christmas collection in 2006. Another album of new material (Für Immer), came out in 2008. His last album Zeitreif appeared in 2011.

In April 2017, Marcus declared the end of his career, citing chronic obstructive pulmonary disease as the reason. According to his manager and longtime companion Nikolaus Fischer, he died of the disease in the middle of May 2018 in Munich, a few weeks shy of his 70th birthday.

== Charting singles ==
(Indicates highest position on German Singles Chart)

- 1970: "Nur du (El condor pasa)" (No. 32)
- 1971: "Nur Liebe zählt" (No. 47)
- 1972: "Eine neue Liebe ist wie ein neues Leben" (No. 2)
- 1973: "Ein Festival der Liebe" (No. 3)
- 1973: "Schmetterlinge können nicht weinen" (No. 8)
- 1974: "Irgendwann kommt jeder mal nach San Francisco" (No. 17)
- 1974: "Grand Prix d'Amour" (No. 22)
- 1974: "Ich hab' die Liebe nicht erfunden" (No. 23)
- 1975: "Ein Lied zieht hinaus in die Welt" (No. 3)
- 1975: "Ein Engel, der mich liebt" (No. 44)
- 1975: "Auf dem Karussell fahren alle gleich schnell" (No. 32)
- 1976: "Komm mit – auf die Sonnenseite der Straße" (No. 28)
- 1976: "Der Tingler singt für euch alle" (No. 46)
- 1977: "Die Uhr geht vor – du kannst noch bleiben" (No. 33)
- 1981: "Engel der Nacht" (No. 31)

| Preceded by Geraldine | Luxembourg in the Eurovision Song Contest; 1976 | Succeeded by Anne-Marie B |
