= Catherine Ferry (singer) =

French singer

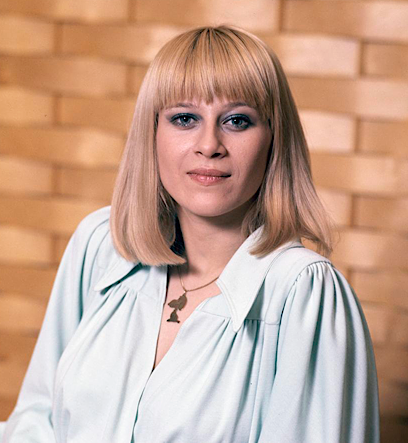
- Catherine Ferry in 1976

Background information
- Born: 1 July 1953 (age 72); Ivry-sur-Seine, France
- Genres: rock, pop, chanson
- Years active: 1976 –
- Labels: Warner Music France (1977–1989), Arthanor Productions (2011 – )
- Website: www.catherineferry.com

Catherine Ferry (born 1 July 1953) is a French singer. In 1976, at the Eurovision Song Contest, Catherine Ferry represented France with the song "Un, deux, trois" (Tony Rallo/Jean Paul Cara). She ranked second in the contest. Among the backing vocalists was Daniel Balavoine, who wrote the B-side "Petit Jean". She worked and was produced mainly by Daniel Balavoine, a famous French singer who wrote nearly 30 songs for her.

In 1977, she took part in the Yamaha Festival in Japan. In 1982, she released the song "Bonjour, Bonjour" (Linda Lecomte/Balavoine) on WEA. In 1983, she participated in the musical fairy tale "Abbacadabra" by Alain Boublil based on ABBA's songs. In 1984, the album "Vivre avec la musique" was released, produced by Andy Scott, with music by Daniel Balavoine, Joe Hammer and Michel Rorive, lyrics by Daniel Balavoine, Linda Lecomte, Patrick Dulphy, Bernard Balavoine and Francis Wauthers.

Balavoine died in 1986, having failed to finish the French lyrics of a song originally written for Frida of Abba. Jean-Jacques Goldman wrote the lyrics of "Quelqu'un Quelque part". Ferry then took time off to have a family.

In the spring of 2010, things came full circle, with Catherine Ferry returning to Geneva in order to record her new single "Petit Jean" with John Woolloff, the guitar player of the late Daniel Balavoine. As her songs became "cult" favourites, one of them, "1, 2, 3", was selected to appear in the movie "Potiche", by French director François Ozon, starring Catherine Deneuve and Gérard Depardieu.

== Discography ==
- Singles
  - 1975 : Julia mon cœur – Chanson pour toi
  - 1976 : 1, 2, 3 – Petit Jean
  - 1976 : Ma chanson d'amour – Petit Jean
  - 1977 : Mélodie bleue – Une histoire d'amour
  - 1977 : J'ai laissé le bon temps rouler – Pour tous ceux qui s'aiment
  - 1978 : J'imagine – Le chanteur anglais
  - 1979 : Dis goodbye à ton goodboy – Baxter
  - 1980 : Tu es mon ennemi – Maman vit avec les animaux
  - 1982 : Bonjour Bonjour – Il est en retard
  - 1983 : Grandis pas – Pourquoi pas
  - 1983 : Vivre avec la musique – Un homme tout perdu
  - 1983 : Prends tout ce qu'on te donne – Raté
  - 1986 : Quelqu'un quelque part – Ce matin
  - 1989 : Manille – Rendez-vous
- Albums
  - 1977 : Catherine Ferry
  - 1984 : Vivre avec la musique
  - 2010 : Reedition remastered

Preceded by Nicole Rieu withEt bonjour à toi l'artiste	France in the Eurovision Song Contest; 1976	Succeeded by Marie Myriam withL'oiseau et l'enfant
