= Red Hurley =

Irish popular singer (born 1949)

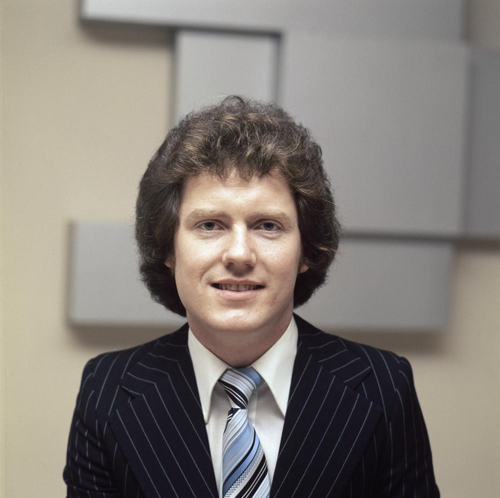
- Red Hurley in 1976

Background information
- Born: Brian Hurley; 11 November 1949 (age 76); Dublin, Ireland
- Genres: Popular music, easy listening, gospel music
- Occupation: Vocalist
- Years active: 1969–present
- Label: Dolphin Records

Brian "Red" Hurley (born 11 November 1949) is an Irish singer. Hurley's career includes singing lead for bands such as The Colours, The Wheels, and The Nevada (né The Nevada Showband). He had a series of number one records in the 1970s while performing with The Nevada. Hurley also represented Ireland at the Eurovision Song Contest in 1976 with the song "When".

== Personal life ==
Hurley was born in 1949 and grew up in Milltown, Dublin, with four brothers (Fran, Liam, Joe, and Des) as well as two sisters (Flo and Olive).

Hurley's first marriage was to Dublin model Patricia Ward and ended in the mid-1980s; they had one daughter together, Kimberley. He met his second wife, Norma, in 1990 when she was a dancer in one of his shows. She was 18 years old performing mutually in a show called Can't Stop The Music at the Gaeity when Hurley was set to perform with Twink. Norma slipped off stage on her first night performing, but stayed as an audience member the remainder of the shows due to her interest in Hurley. She was 18 years old when Hurley was 38 years old, though she told him on their first date she was 23 years old. Eventually they agreed that the age gap did not bother them and they were eventually married in Dublin in 2008. The couple have two daughters, Kristina and Stephanie.

== Career ==
=== 1969-71: Early Career & The "Big Break" ===
Hurley started his career in 1969 as lead vocalist with The Colours. In 1970, he went on to form his first band, The Wheels. He released several successful singles during this period with The Wheels including Isadora, Take Me Tonight and Poor Man's Roses, all of which made it into the Irish charts.

In early 1971, Hurley joined The Nevada, one of Ireland's top pop acts of that era, quickly becoming their most popular ever lead singer with a string of number one hits - many penned by British songwriters Les Reed and Barry Mason specifically for Hurley including "Sometimes", "Kiss Me Goodbye", and "I Never Said Goodbye". He left The Nevada in 1974 to form his own band, the Red Hurley Band, and performed songs such as "Love Is All", "Broken Promises", "Tennessee Special" among others. Hurley toured extensively right up to the late 1980s. Throughout this time, despite domestic success in Ireland, international success eluded him. Though he was signed to Red Bus Records (one of the UK's premier agencies), Hurley was considered an uphill battle for showbiz promoters. Hurley's overall record in the Irish Charts places him with over twenty songs in the Irish Charts and five number-ones overall. Altogether he has recorded over 500 songs in a career spanning the early seventies to the present day. Due to his consistent activity, Hurley has one of the longest chart careers in Irish show-business history.

=== 1970-2005: End of an era and new beginnings ===
Towards the end of the 1970s and into the 1980s, the Irish pop music scene underwent a period of significant change. Established artists like Hurley, whose careers had begun in the showband era, were making way for rock groups like U2 (among others) who were changing the music map in Ireland and internationally. Despite this, Hurley managed to maintain his career in Ireland throughout this time, albeit at a lower profile. In 1976 Hurley represented Ireland at the Eurovision Song Contest. Though one of the early favourites to win the contest, his song finished 10th on the night with 54 points, beaten by the winning UK entry Brotherhood of Man and their song "Save Your Kisses for Me".

Hurley's song "When" became a major chart hit in Ireland and with Eurovision fans, landing it as a regular in Hurley's live show set lists. "When" was written by Brendan Graham, who subsequently composed two Eurovision winning songs for Ireland, "Rock 'n' Roll Kids" in 1994 and "The Voice" for mezzo-soprano Eimear Quinn in 1996. Graham also composed the worldwide hit "You Raise Me Up", a major hit for Josh Groban in the U.S and Westlife in the UK.

Throughout the 90s, while his chart career declined in Ireland, Red Hurley moved to the United States. He gradually made inroads into the market there but would have to wait until 2003 for a return to the music charts with the release of his new album You're Still You. The album was a surprise success in Ireland, eventually leading to a successful comeback in the Irish market and a string of new recordings, as well as the international success (in both the UK and USA) which had previously eluded him. Gradually record sales increased, as did attendance at his live concert performances. Hurley managed to re-establish himself as a major live concert and cabaret artist. Regular appearances on high-profile TV and radio shows in Ireland, the UK and the USA followed.

=== 2010 - Present ===
Red Hurley now enjoys renewed success both in Ireland and the USA. In 2010 he celebrated 40 years in show business with a sell-out tour of Ireland with his special guest, legendary singer Rita Coolidge at Dublin's Grand Canal Theatre. Pulitzer Prize-Winning American author Maya Angelou became an admirer of the singer and helped introduce him to American audiences. A greatest hits compilation 'Red Hurley – The Hits' reached the Irish top ten in 2009 and the singer also starred in a TV special for PBS in America in 2006, filmed before a live audience in Dublin's Olympia Theatre. Speaking in September 2010 of the renewed interest in his career, Hurley said that he was delighted and really enjoying his life again. Kevin Myers, writing in the "Irish Independent" in September 2010 said:

His intuitive sense of the beautiful is one reason why Red Hurley is such a wonderful singer. He will find the key element of any song – a single note or phrase – and elevate that into an unexpected little musical jewel.

Internet concert reviews blog Daniel Lindon Reviews said of Red, 'Rarely has an artist had the persistence and self-belief to rise above many career setbacks and emerge once again triumphant, he is one of the great male voices and his international success is long overdue'. Red Hurley continues to tour regularly in Ireland, USA and in the UK. In August 2014, he was one of the musical soloists chosen to perform at the State Funeral of former Irish Prime Minister, Albert Reynolds. In 2022, Hurley began a 50th anniversary tour in Ireland in venues such as The Civic, the Pavilion Theatre, the Draīocht, among others. He also appeared on Today with Maura and Daithi on 28 November 2022, has been a guest on the RTÉ Radio 1 show from the same network numerous times prior, and appeared with Claudia Boyle on The Late Late Show on 10 October 2020 where they performed "Time To Say Goodbye".

== Irish Charts Positions ==
Song title	Month/Year	Rank	Record Company
*A Poor Man's Roses / I Didn't Even Know	June 1969	#14	Target Records
**Isadora / Amgios	May 1970	#14	Target Records
**Take Me Tonight / Let's Get Started	Sept 1970	#20	Target Records
***Going Away	March 1971	Unknown	Play Records
***Sometimes / I'll Be Home	July 1971	#1	Play Records
***Kiss Me Goodbye / Bring Back The Good Times	Oct 1971	#1	Play Records
***Hold Me / Trudy	April 1972	#3	Play Records
***Arkansas / Hold Me Just One More Time	Feb 1973	#2	Play Records
***I Never Said Goodbye / I'd Like To Teach You	Aug 1973	#5	Play Records
I Know	1974	#5	Release Records
Love Is All / Morea	1975	#1	Release Records
Broken Promises	Jan 1976	#1	Release Records
When	March 1976	#4	PYE Records
Tennessee Special / Granny's Got A Painted Leg	Sept 1976	#3	EMI/Red Bus Records
In Shame Love, In Shame / Listen To The Children	Feb 1977	#3	Release Records
You're My Day, You're My Night / Morena	July 1977	#2	Release Records
You Don't Have To Say You Love Me	May 1978	#5	Release Records
You're So Good To Me / Steppin' Aside	Feb1979	#9	Spider Records
The Furey Man	Nov 1979	#6	Spider Records
I Want To Live With You / Perfect Love	Jan 1981	#29	Spider Records
Hey / Cut Across Shorty	Feb 1983	#15	Crashed Records
Danny	Sept 1983	#15	Crashed Records
I Believe I'm Going To Love You	June 1985	#21	Dolphin Records
Let The Heartaches Begin	June 1987	#20	Dolphin Records
For Always	April 1989	#19	Dolphin Records
We Were in Love	Sept 2006	#27	Ensign Records

*The Colours | **The Wheels | ***The Nevada | Solo unless otherwise specified

Albums	Year	Rank (Irish Charts)
Red Hurley 'Hits'	1973	#1
When	1976	#2
Red Hurley With Love	1978	#8
Warm Red	1981	#23
Various Compilations (Ireland/UK/USA)	1982-2003	Unknown
You're Still You	2003	#8
Always There For Me	2005	#14
Raised on Songs and Stories (USA)	2006	Unknown
Red Hurley 'The Hits Album'	2008	#6
How Great Thou Art	2009	#21
Sings My Soul (USA Only)	2010	Unknown
Red Hurley 'The Hits Album' (Re Issue)	2012	Unknown
Updated Greatest Hits CD	2014	Unknown

Awards and achievements
Preceded by The Swarbriggs with "That's What Friends Are For"	Ireland in the Eurovision Song Contest; 1976	Succeeded by The Swarbriggs Plus Two with "It's Nice to Be in Love Again"
