= World Forum (The Hague) =

Convention center in The Hague, Netherlands

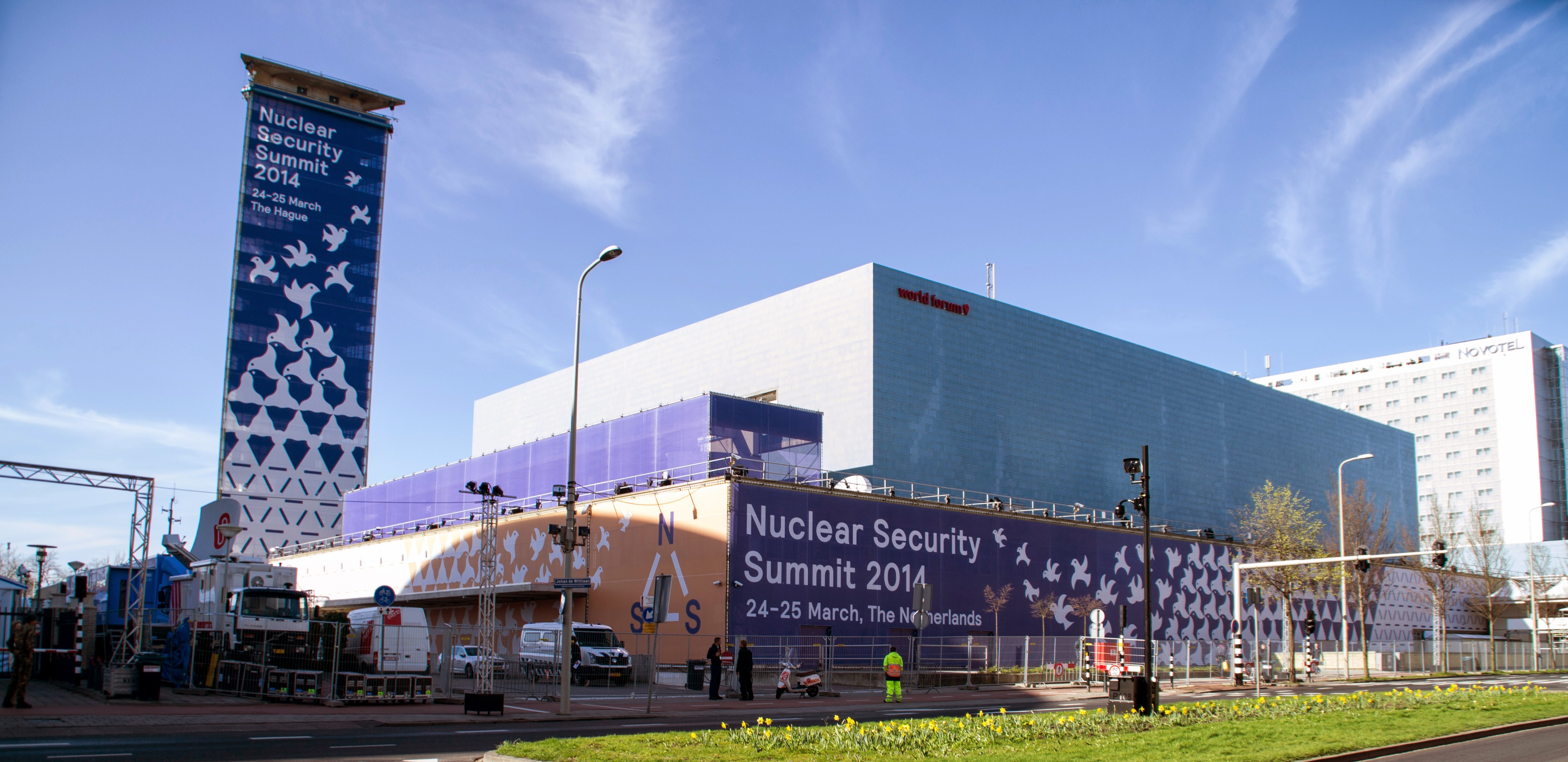
- World Forum during the 2014 Nuclear Security Summit
- Interactive map of World Forum
- Former names: Nederlands Congresgebouw; Nederlands Congres Centrum; World Forum Convention Center
- Location: The Hague, Netherlands
- Coordinates: 52°5′34.5″N 4°16′55.9″E
- Owner: Municipality of The Hague; Trammell Crow Nederland Property Projects (2001–2009); GL Events (2009–2013)
- Capacity: 2,161 (theater)

Construction
- Groundbreaking: 30 June 1964
- Built: 1964–1969
- Opened: 14 March 1969
- Renovated: 1996, 2005
- Expanded: 1986–1989
- Demolished: 2006 (Statenhal)
- Architect: Jacobus Johannes Pieter Oud
- Main contractor: Ballast Nedam

Website
- www.worldforum.nl

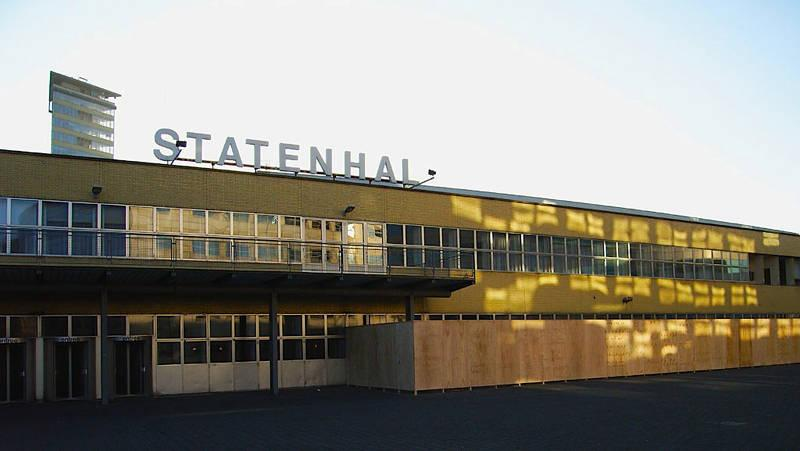
The Statenhal in January 2006 not long before it was demolished.

The World Forum (originally known as Nederlands Congresgebouw and formerly Nederlands Congres Centrum and World Forum Convention Center) is a concert venue and convention centre in The Hague, Netherlands, near the buildings of the Organisation for the Prohibition of Chemical Weapons (OPCW) and one of the administrative offices of the International Baccalaureate.

== History ==
It was opened in 1969 and was designed in the Dutch functionalism style by architect Jacobus Johannes Pieter Oud. His son, Hans Oud, completed the construction after his father's death in 1963.

In 2006 a part of the convention center, including the Statenhal, was demolished to make place for the Europol building. Many concerts and festivals had been held there before, such as the annual North Sea Jazz Festival, and the Eurovision Song Contests of 1976 and 1980. Between 2006 and 2010 The Hague Jazz festival was held at the World Forum (to replace the moved North Sea Jazz festival, which is now held in Rotterdam). Since 2011 the festival is held in the Kyocera Stadium.

== Events ==
Nederlands Congresgebouw

- Wings – 20–21 August 1972
- Queen – 8 December 1974 (their first performance in the Netherlands)
- Eurovision Song Contest – 1976 and 1980
- North Sea Jazz Festival – 1976–2005
- National Song Festival – 22 February 1978 (won by Harmony with their song 't Is OK)
- Finch – 14 November 1978 (their final concert)
- Eric Clapton – 24 February 1990
- 48th World Science Fiction Convention – 23–27 August 1990
- Toto – 30 November 1990
- a-ha – 4 April 1991

Nederlands Congres Centrum

- Celine Dion – 27 May 1995
- Backstreet Boys – 9 December 1996
- Sarah Brightman – 22 May 1999
- Laura Pausini – 18 January 2002
- Laura Pausini – 13 March 2005

World Forum Convention Center

- The Hague Jazz – 2006–2010
- International Conference on Afghanistan – 31 March 2009
- Meet the Future, Science & Technology Summit – 18 November 2010
- The Hague International Model United Nations (THIMUN) – Annually

World Forum

- AnimeCon - Anime Convention – Annually
- Nuclear Security Summit – 24–25 March 2014
- Nick Cave – 16 to 17 May 2015
- Global Entrepreneurship Summit – 4–5 June 2019
- Ukraine Accountability Conference – 14 July 2022
- Volodymyr Zelenskyy speech – 4 May 2023
- IUPAC-CHAINS 2023 – 18–25 August 2023
- 2025 The Hague NATO summit – 24–26 June 2025

== See also ==
- List of convention centres in the Netherlands

Preceded by Stockholmsmässan; Stockholm	Eurovision Song Contest; Venue; 1976	Succeeded by Wembley Conference Centre; London
Preceded by International Convention Center; Jerusalem	Eurovision Song Contest; Venue; 1980	Succeeded by RDS Simmonscourt Pavilion; Dublin
