= We'll Live It All Again =

1976 song by Al Bano and Romina Power

"We'll Live It All Again (Lo rivivrei)"

Single by Al Bano and Romina Power

from the album 1978
- Released: 1976
- Length: 4:07
- Label: Libra
- Composer: Detto Mariano
- Lyricists: Albano Carrisi; Romina Power

Eurovision Song Contest 1976 entry
- Country: Italy
- Artists: Albano Carrisi; Romina Power
- As: Al Bano and Romina Power
- Languages: Italian; English
- Composer: Detto Mariano
- Lyricists: Albano Carrisi; Romina Power
- Conductor: Maurizio Fabrizio

Finals performance
- Final result: 7th
- Final points: 69

Entry chronology
- ◄ "Era" (1975)
- "Libera" (1977) ►

"We'll Live It All Again (Lo rivivrei)" is a song recorded by Italian-American duo Al Bano and Romina Power, with music composed by Detto Mariano and lyrics written by Albano and Romina themselves. It represented Italy in the Eurovision Song Contest 1976 held in The Hague.

== Background ==
=== Conception ===
"We'll Live It All Again (Lo rivivrei)" was composed by Detto Mariano with lyrics written by Albano Carrisi and Romina Power and recorded by themselves as Al Bano and Romina Power. The song is a love duet sung from the perspective of a married couple addressing each other. They recall their first kiss and their early relationship and later sing about their pride at having a daughter together. They tell each other that they would each "live it all again" and if this were the case, "I'd always choose you again".

In addition to the English-Italian version, they recorded the song in Italian –as "E fu subito amore"–, in French –"T'aimer encore une fois"–, in Spanish –"Viviremos todo de nuevo"–, in English-Italian-French, and in English-Spanish. In 1982, they re-recorded the song for their Spanish language album Felicidad with new lyrics and retitled "Vivirlo otra vez".

=== Eurovision ===
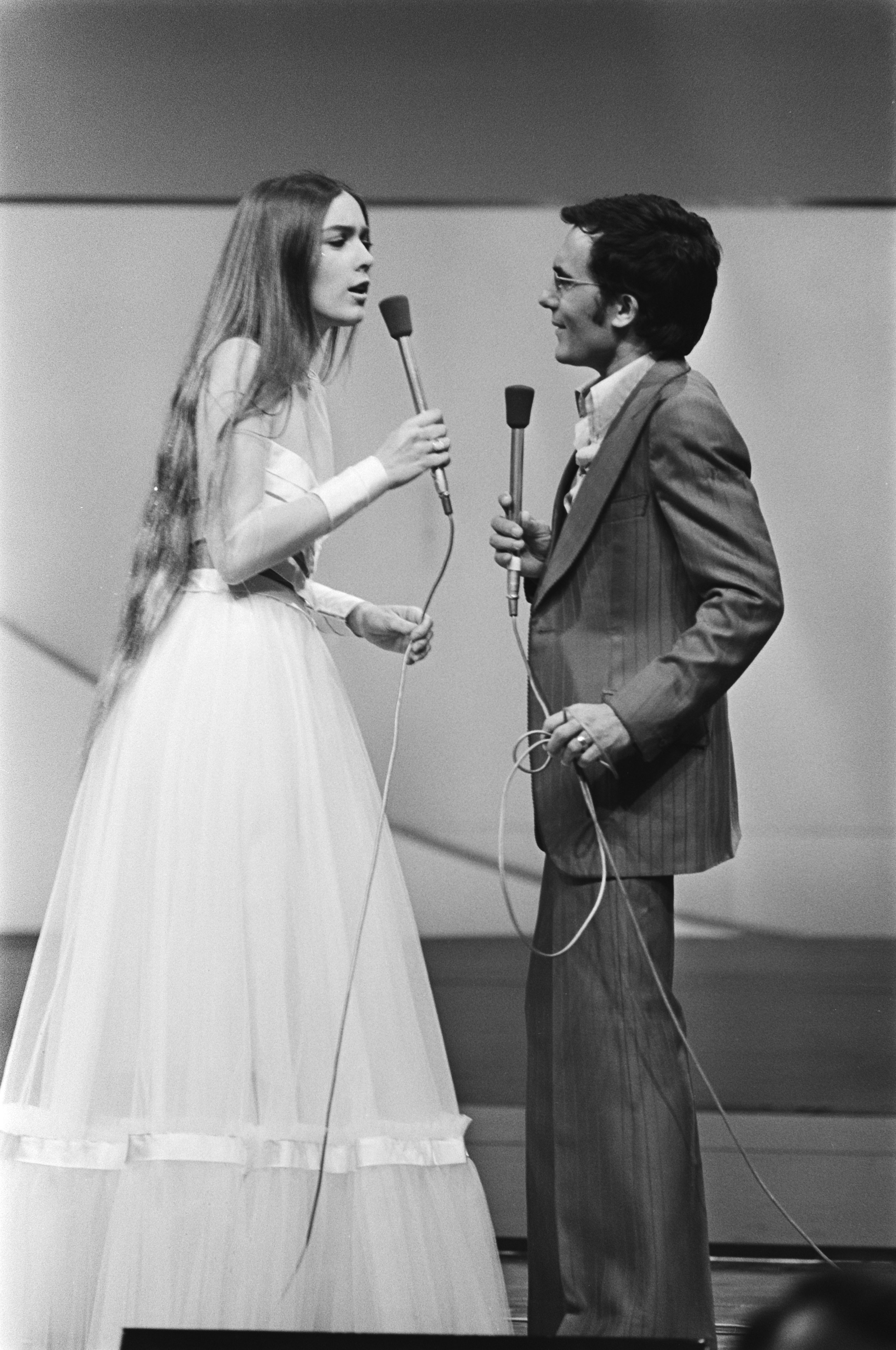
Al Bano and Romina Power in Eurovision.

Radiotelevisione italiana (RAI) internally selected "We'll Live It All Again" as its entry for the 21st edition of the Eurovision Song Contest.

On 3 April 1976, the Eurovision Song Contest was held at the Nederlands Congresgebouw in The Hague hosted by Nederlandse Omroep Stichting (NOS), and broadcast live throughout the continent. Al Bano and Romina Power performed "We'll Live It All Again" in English-Italian thirteenth on the night, following Spain's "Sobran las palabras" by Braulio and preceding Austria's "My Little World" by Waterloo & Robinson. Maurizio Fabrizio conducted the live orchestra in the performance of the Italian entry. It was the country's first entry not to be sung entirely in Italian in the contest, and one of only three –alongside 1984's "I treni di Tozeur" and 1991's "Comme è ddoce 'o mare"– between the country's debut and its 1998–2010 hiatus.

At the close of voting, it had received 69 points, placing seventh in a field of eighteen. It was succeeded as Italian representative at the 1977 contest by "Libera" by Mia Martini. Al Bano and Romina Power returned to the Contest in 1985 with "Magic Oh Magic".

== Track listing ==
- 7" Single

A. "We'll Live It All Again (Lo rivivrei)" – 4:07
B. "Na, na, na" – 3:33

- Spanish 7" Single

A. "Viviremos todo de nuevo" – 4:12
B. "Mai, mai, mai" – 4:00

- French 7" Single

A. "T'aimer encore une fois" (Version française) – 4:05
B. "T'aimer encore une fois" (Version italienne) – 4:05

== Chart performance ==
=== Weekly charts ===
Chart (1976)	Peak position
France (SNEP)	2
