= 1977 in Dutch television =

This is a list of Dutch television related events from 1977.

== Events ==
- 2 February – Heddy Lester is selected to represent Netherlands at the 1977 Eurovision Song Contest with her song "De mallemolen". She is selected to be the twenty-second Dutch Eurovision entry during Nationaal Songfestival held at Congresgebouw in The Hague.
- 7 May – France wins the Eurovision Song Contest with "L'Oiseau et l'Enfant" by Marie Myriam. The Netherlands finish in twelfth place with the song "De mallemolen" by Heddy Lester.

== Television shows ==
=== 1950s ===
- NOS Journaal (1956–present)
- Pipo de Clown (1958–present)

=== 1970s ===
- Sesamstraat (1976–present)

== Births ==
- 1 February – Sonja Silva, TV presenter, actress, model & singer
- 21 February – Dennis Weening, TV & radio presenter
- 13 April – Javier Gozman, Spanish-born stand-up comedian & actor
