= Spain in the Eurovision Song Contest 1977 =

- Eurovision Song Contest 1977
- Participating broadcaster: Televisión Española (TVE)
- Country: Spain
- Selection process: Internal selection
- Announcement date: 9 February 1977

Competing entry
- Song: "Enséñame a cantar"
- Artist: Micky
- Songwriter: Fernando Arbex

Placement
- Final result: 9th, 52 points

Participation chronology

Spain was represented at the Eurovision Song Contest 1977 with the song "Enséñame a cantar", written by Fernando Arbex, and performed by Micky. The Spanish participating broadcaster, Televisión Española (TVE), internally selected its entry for the contest. The song, performed in position 14, placed ninth out of eighteen competing entries with 52 points.

== Before Eurovision ==
Televisión Española (TVE) assembled a jury of 23 members chosen from television, radio, and newspaper media who, locked up on 9 February 1977, internally selected among 25 candidate songs "Enséñame a cantar" performed by Micky as the Spanish entry for the Eurovision Song Contest 1977. The song was written by Fernando Arbex. The title of the song, the songwriter, and the performer were announced that same day. The broadcaster presented the song to the press on 4 March. The song's preview video was directed by Valerio Lazarov and filmed on location in Ibiza. Micky also recorded the song in French as "Apprends-moi à chanter" and in German as "Ich singe la la la".

== At Eurovision ==
On 7 May 1977, the Eurovision Song Contest was held at the Wembley Conference Centre in London hosted by the British Broadcasting Corporation (BBC) and broadcast live throughout the continent. Micky performed "Enséñame a cantar" 14th in the evening, following Sweden and preceding Italy. Rafael Ibarbia conducted the event's orchestra performance of the Spanish entry. At the close of voting "Enséñame a cantar" had received 52 points, placing 9th in a field of 18.

TVE broadcast the contest in Spain on TVE 1 with commentary by Miguel de los Santos. Before the event, TVE aired a talk show hosted by Isabel Tenaille introducing the Spanish jury from Prado del Rey, which continued after the contest commenting on the results.

=== Voting ===
TVE assembled a jury panel with eleven members. The following members comprised the Spanish jury:

- José Martínez Molla – fallas sculptor
- María Antonia Martínez Pérez – secretary
- Claudio Mariscal – endocrinologist
- Celia García Obregón – student
- María José Cantudo – actress
- Rosa Grajal López – stewardess
- Ángel del Pozo – actor and director
- María Ángeles Morán Galván – teacher
- Adolfo Fernández Montero – maître
- Esperanza de la Fuente – nurse
- Roberto Fernández Fernández – draftsman and painter

The jury was chaired by Javier Caballé, who was the coordinator of musical programs at TVE, with Isabel Tenaille as secretary and spokesperson. These did not have the right to vote, but the president decided in the event of a tie. The jury awarded its maximum of 12 points to Greece.

Points awarded to Spain
Score	Country
12 points	
10 points	
8 points	
7 points	Belgium; Finland; Germany; Italy; Luxembourg
6 points	Netherlands
5 points	
4 points	Greece
3 points	Switzerland; United Kingdom
2 points	
1 point	Austria

Points awarded by Spain
Score	Country
12 points	Greece
10 points	France
8 points	Monaco
7 points	Luxembourg
6 points	Israel
5 points	Germany
4 points	Ireland
3 points	United Kingdom
2 points	Italy
1 point	Netherlands
