= Switzerland in the Eurovision Song Contest 1977 =

- Eurovision Song Contest 1977
- Participating broadcaster: Swiss Broadcasting Corporation (SRG SSR)
- Country: Switzerland
- Selection process: Concours Eurovision de la Chanson
- Selection date: 19 January 1977

Competing entry
- Song: "Swiss Lady"
- Artist: Pepe Lienhard Band
- Songwriter: Peter Reber

Placement
- Final result: 6th, 71 points

Participation chronology

Switzerland was represented at the Eurovision Song Contest 1977 with the song "Swiss Lady", written by Peter Reber, and performed by the Pepe Lienhard Band. The Swiss participating broadcaster, the Swiss Broadcasting Corporation (SRG SSR), selected its entry for the contest through a national final.

== Before Eurovision ==
=== Concours Eurovision de la Chanson ===
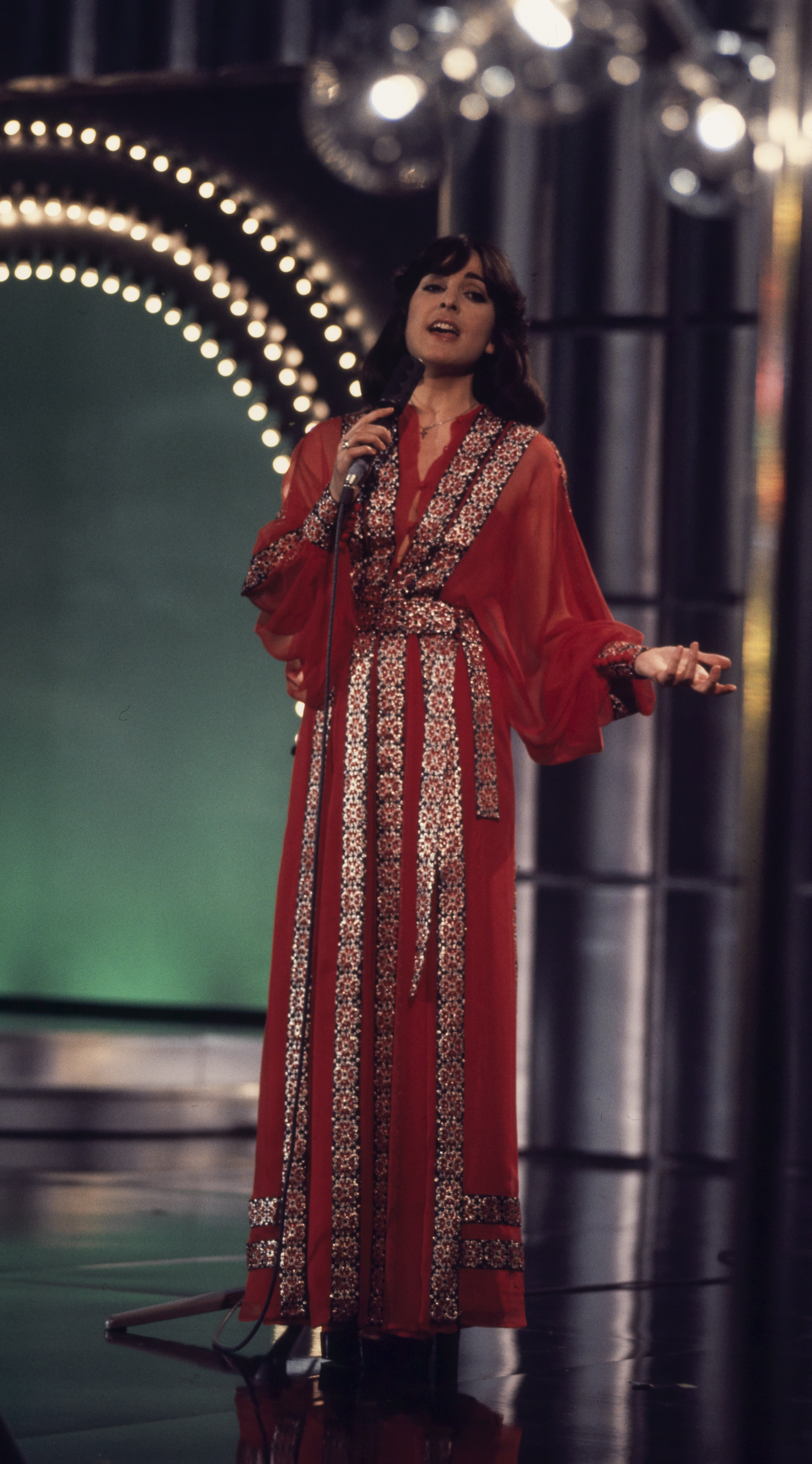
Two members of Pepe Lienhard Band (left to right: Pepe Lienhard and Bill von Arx) and Paola (right) performing in the national final

The Swiss Broadcasting Corporation (SRG SSR) held a national final to select its entry for the Eurovision Song Contest 1977. Auditions were held from 30 August to 22 October, 1976 for interested songwriters, where the broadcaster received 110 total song submissions (64 in French, 32 in German, and 14 in Italian), and shortlisted twenty songs. On 24 November, the national jury ultimately selected ten to take part in the selection, with six being performed in French, three in German, and one in Italian.

Among the participants were Véronique Müller, who represented Switzerland in 1972; Piera Martell, who represented Switzerland in 1974; and Paola del Medico, who represented Switzerland in 1969 and would repeat in 1980. Carole Vinci would later represent Switzerland in 1978. Paola was selected with two different songs, but was required to withdraw one due to a rule stating all participating artists must perform only one song. The song "Wunderbar" was ultimately chosen to be removed from the lineup.

Swiss German and Romansh broadcaster Schweizer Fernsehen der deutschen und rätoromanischen Schweiz (SF DRS) staged the national final on 19 January 1977 at 21:00 CET in Zürich. It was presented by Rita Anderman, with Hans Moeckel conducting the orchestra. Peter, Sue and Marc, who represented Switzerland in 1971 and 1976, and Brotherhood of Man, who won Eurovision for the United Kingdom in 1976, made guest appearances.

Participating entries
Broadcaster	Artist(s)	Song	Songwriter(s)		Language
Broadcaster	Artist(s)	Song	Composer(s)	Lyricist(s)	Language
TSR	Sweet People	"Viens avec nous"	Jean-Jacques Egli		French
TSR	Carole Vinci	"Dites-moi ce qu'est l'amour"	Thierry Fervant	Bernard Pichon	French
TSR	Gérald Matthey	"Le Cœur dans les nuages"	Thierry Fervant	Bernard Pichon	French
TSR	Frédérique Sand	"Faites la vie"	Frank Olivier Hay	Alain Penel; Edmée Cuttat	French
TSR	Paola	"Le Livre blanc"	Peter Reber; Eric Merz		French
DRS	Véronique Müller	"Heyho"	Véronique Müller		German
DRS	Piera Martell	"Aldo Rinaldo"	Max Rüeger		German
DRS	Pepe Lienhard Band	"Swiss Lady"	Peter Reber		German
DRS	~~Paola~~	~~"Wunderbar"~~	~~Peter Reber~~		German
TSI	Leonia	"Passo… vedo"	Raphael Gibardi		Italian

The voting consisted of regional public votes which were sent to the three divisions of SRG SSR (DRS, TSR, TSI: German, French and Italian speaking, respectively), a press jury, and a jury of music experts. Applications for viewers to join the regional juries were sent via postcard until 12 January, and 50 viewers from each canton were randomly selected to cast their votes to their broadcaster divisions via phone call. Additionally, one random voter in the public jury would be drawn to be invited to attend the Eurovision Song Contest as an audience member along with a companion. The selected voter was Verena Hofer. Due to technical difficulties regarding the Swiss-French jury, their votes were announced later than scheduled. The winner was the song "Swiss Lady", written by Peter Reber, and performed by the Pepe Lienhard Band.

Final — 19 January 1977
R/O	Artist(s)	Song	Regional Juries			Press Jury	Expert Jury	Total	Place
R/O	Artist(s)	Song	DRS	TSI	TSR	Press Jury	Expert Jury	Total	Place
1	Sweet People	"Viens avec nous"	7	6	7	7	7	34	3
2	Véronique Müller	"Heyho"	4	4	3	5	2	18	6
3	Piera Martell	"Aldo Rinaldo"	6	5	6	4	5	26	4
4	Leonia	"Passo… vedo"	2	7	2	2	4	17	7
5	Pepe Lienhard Band	"Swiss Lady"	9	9	9	9	8	44	1
6	Carole Vinci	"Dites-moi ce qu'est l'amour"	5	4	5	6	6	26	4
7	Gérald Matthey	"Le Cœur dans les nuages"	1	4	4	3	3	15	8
8	Frédérique Sand	"Faites la vie"	3	1	1	1	1	7	9
9	Paola	"Le Livre blanc"	8	8	8	8	9	41	2

=== Releases ===
The Pepe Lienhard Band first recorded and released "Swiss Lady" in German and English between 1976 and 1977. In 1998, the song was featured in a CD compilation titled "Concours Eurovision De La Chanson 1956-1998: Schweizer Beiträge", which compiled every Swiss Eurovision entry at the time.

The only other participants who commercially released their songs that performed in the selection were Paola, Piera Martell, and Véronique Müller. The full selection has been archived by SRG SSR and is able to be watched online.

== At Eurovision ==
At the Eurovision Song Contest 1977, held at the Wembley Conference Centre in London, the Swiss entry was the twelfth entry of the night following Israel and preceding Sweden. The Swiss conductor at the contest was Peter Jacques, who previously conducted the 1973 Swiss entry. At the close of voting, Switzerland had received 71 points in total; finishing in sixth place out of eighteen countries.

The contest was broadcast on SRG SSR via TV DRS (with commentary from Theodor Haller) in German-speaking Switzerland, TSR (with commentary from Georges Hardy) and RSR 2 (with commentary from Robert Burnier) in Romandy, and TSI and RSI 2 in Ticino.

=== Voting ===
Each participating broadcaster assembled a jury panel with at least eleven members. The jurors awarded 1-8, 10, and 12 points to their top ten songs. Until 1980, the votes were given in the order the awarded songs were performed in, rather than in ascending numerical order.

Points awarded to Switzerland
Score	Country
12 points	
10 points	Austria; Finland; Norway
8 points	Belgium
7 points	
6 points	Greece; Ireland
5 points	Luxembourg
4 points	Israel; Italy; Portugal; United Kingdom
3 points	
2 points	
1 point	

Points awarded by Switzerland
Score	Country
12 points	France
10 points	Israel
8 points	Ireland
7 points	Netherlands
6 points	Monaco
5 points	Finland
4 points	Portugal
3 points	Spain
2 points	Italy
1 point	Greece
