= L'Oiseau et l'Enfant =

1977 song by Marie Myriam

Single by Marie Myriam
- Language: French
- Released: 1977
- Label: Polydor
- Composer: Jean-Paul Cara
- Lyricist: Joe Gracy

Eurovision Song Contest 1977 entry
- Country: France
- Artist: Miriam Lopes
- As: Marie Myriam
- Language: English
- Composer: Jean-Paul Cara
- Lyricist: Joe Gracy
- Conductor: Raymond Donnez

Finals performance
- Final result: 1st
- Final points: 136

Entry chronology
- ◄ "Un, deux, trois" (1976)
- "Il y aura toujours des violons" (1978) ►

Official performance video
- "L'Oiseau et l'Enfant" on YouTube

"L'Oiseau et l'Enfant" (French pronunciation: [lwazo e lɑ̃fɑ̃]; "The Bird and the Child") is a song recording by French singer Marie Myriam with music composed by Jean-Paul Cara and French lyrics written by Joe Gracy. It represented France in the Eurovision Song Contest 1977 held in London, resulting in the country's last win to date at the contest.

== Background ==
=== Conception ===
"L'Oiseau et l'Enfant" was composed by Jean-Paul Cara with French lyrics by Joe Gracy and was recorded by Marie Myriam. She recorded the song in five languages; French, English –as "The Bird and the Child"–, German –"Der Vogel und das Mädchen" with lyrics by Joe Gracy and H. von Schenckendorf–, Spanish –"El zagal y el ave azul"–, and her mother tongue Portuguese –"A ave e a infância"–.

=== Eurovision ===
Between 20 February–6 March 1977, "L'Oiseau et l'Enfant" performed by Marie Myriam competed in the national final that Télévision Française 1 (TF1) organized to select its song and performer for the 22nd edition of the Eurovision Song Contest. The song won the competition so it became the French entry –and Myriam the performer– for Eurovision.

A promo video was released showing Myriam performing the song in an open-air atmosphere, in a section of the Square René Viviani in Paris. This preview video is notable for the prominent presence of the gendarmes having to restrain the crowd, some of whom having climbed the noted "oldest tree in Paris" to catch a glimpse of the singer. On the contest night, she performed in a floor-length orange gown while her five backup singers were clad in black.

On 7 May 1977, the Eurovision Song Contest was held at the Wembley Conference Centre in London hosted by the British Broadcasting Corporation (BBC) and broadcast live throughout the continent. Myriam performed "L'Oiseau et l'Enfant" eighteenth and last in the evening, following Belgium's "A Million in One, Two, Three" by Dream Express. Raymond Donnez conducted the event's live orchestra in the performance of the French entry.

At the close of voting, it had received 136 points, coming first in a field of eighteen, and winning the contest. It was succeeded as French representative at the 1978 contest by "Il y aura toujours des violons" by Joël Prévost.

=== Aftermath ===
Myriam performed her song in the Eurovision twenty-fifth anniversary show Songs of Europe held on 22 August 1981 in Mysen.

== Chart performance ==
=== Weekly charts ===
Chart (1977)	Peak position
Austria (Ö3 Austria Top 40)	15
Belgium (Ultratop 50 Flanders)	6
France (IFOP)	1
Netherlands (Single Top 100)	23
Sweden (Sverigetopplistan)	5
Switzerland (Schweizer Hitparade)	2
West Germany (GfK)	19

== Legacy ==
In 2016, the UNICEF project Kids United covered the song in their second album Tout le bonheur du monde. The song also appeared on SNEP singles charts in August 2016. A cover of the song was used in an advertisement for IKEA in Canada in 2021.

Preceded by "Save Your Kisses for Me" by Brotherhood of Man	Eurovision Song Contest winners 1977	Succeeded by "A-Ba-Ni-Bi" by Izhar Cohen & Alphabeta
