= Hortto Kaalo =

Finnish Romani band

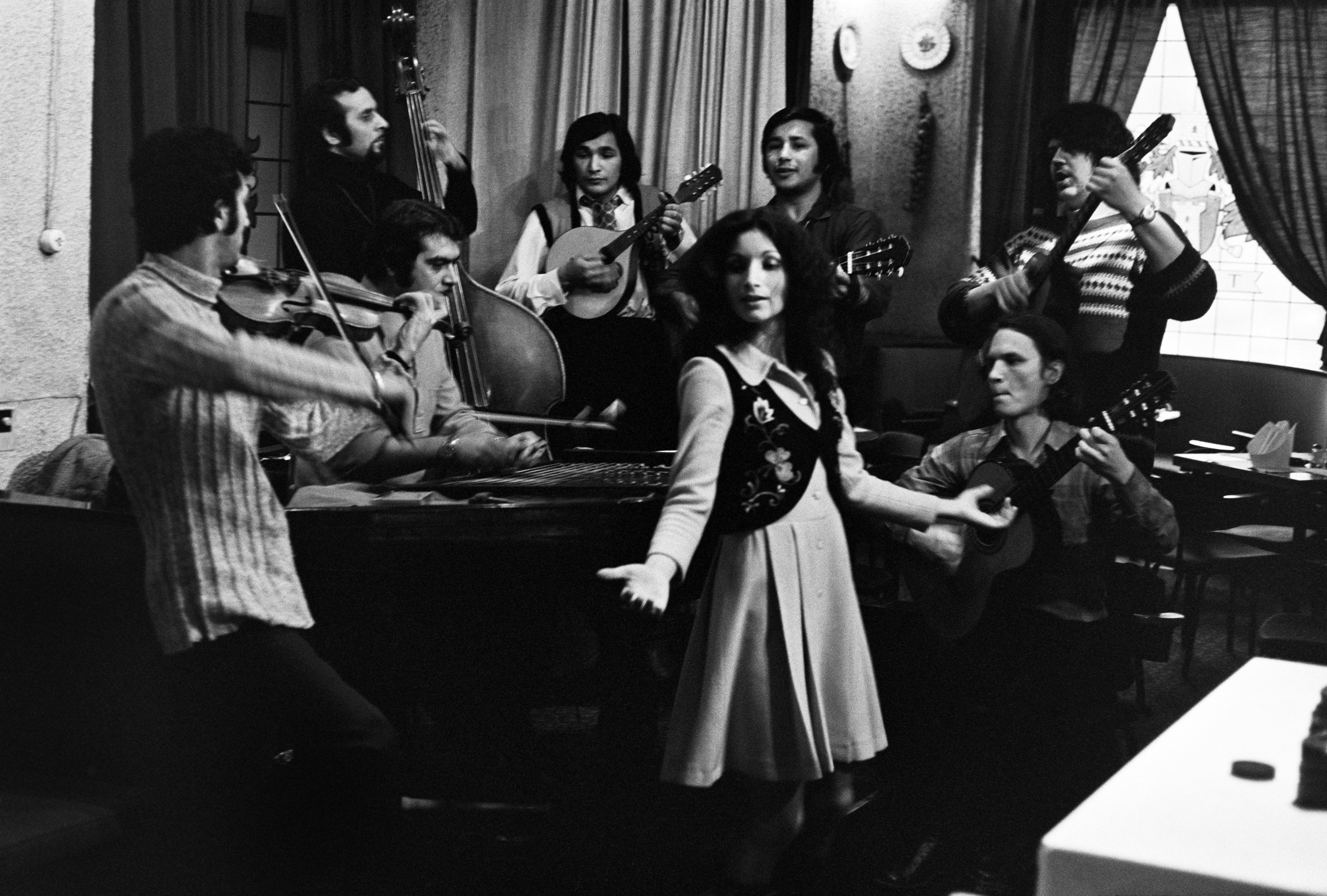
- Hortto Kaalo performing in 1972, with Anneli Sari

Background information
- Origin: Finland
- Genre: Romani music
- Years active: 1969–present
- Labels: Scandia, Rondo

Hortto Kaalo is a Finnish Romani music band performing in both Finnish and Romani. They specialize in Eastern European and French Romani music. The band's name in Romani means 'real Roma'.

The group was formed in 1969 by Feija Åkerlund, Marko Putkonen, Taisto Lundberg, and Heikki Nyman, although Nyman left the group shortly afterwards. Hortto Kaalo has often performed together with the Finnish Romani singer Anneli Sari.

Hortto Kaalo's debut single, the protest song Miksi ovet ei aukene meille? (lit. 'Why won't doors open for us?'), came out in 1970, and has been credited for contributing to the illegalization of racial discrimination in Finland.

In total, the group released six LPs and four compilations. Their first two albums, Hortto Kaalo and Hai Hortto Kaalot (both Scandia Music, 1974) were certified gold.

The group popularized Romani music among mainstream audiences in Finland. Hortto Kaalo was at the peak of their popularity throughout the 1970s. In 1977, the group's song Kauan sitten finished in the second place in the selection contest for the Finnish Eurovision Song Contest entry, losing out to Monica Aspelund's Lapponia.
