= France in the Eurovision Song Contest 1977 =

- Eurovision Song Contest 1977
- Participating broadcaster: Télévision Française 1 (TF1)
- Country: France
- Selection process: National final
- Selection date: 6 March 1977

Competing entry
- Song: "L'Oiseau et l'Enfant"
- Artist: Marie Myriam
- Songwriters: Jean-Paul Cara; Joe Gracy

Placement
- Final result: 1st, 136 points

Participation chronology

France was represented at the Eurovision Song Contest 1977 with the song "L'Oiseau et l'Enfant", composed by Jean-Paul Cara, with lyrics by Joe Gracy, and performed by Marie Myriam. The French participating broadcaster, Télévision Française 1 (TF1), selected its entry through a national final. The entry eventually won the Eurovision Song Contest, making France the first country to achieve five victories in the contest.

== Before Eurovision ==
Following the French success in 1976 with a song chosen through a national final, broadcaster Télévision Française 1 (TF1) again opted for a public selection. The selection process was a cooperation with the French songwriters and composers association SACEM. 360 songs were submitted.

=== National final ===
==== Semi-finals ====
Each semi-final contained seven songs, with the top three in each going forward to the final. The qualifiers were chosen by public televoting.

Semi-final 1 – 20 February 1977
R/O	Artist	Song	Votes	Place	Result
1	Gilles Marchal	"Le Centre du monde"	4,213	4	—N/a
2	Delfine	"Du côté de l'enfance"	5,511	1	Qualified
3	Joël Prévost	"Pour oublier Barbara"	3,918	6	—N/a
4	Pierre Charby	"Chacun sa chanson d'amour"	4,722	3	Qualified
5	Patricia Lavilla	"Vis ta vie"	3,810	7	—N/a
6	Colin Verdier	"La Vie tu sais"	4,881	2	Qualified
7	Maxime Piolot	"Il faut partir"	4,036	5	—N/a

Semi-final 2 – 27 February 1977
R/O	Artist	Song	Votes	Place	Result
1	Monique Pianéa	"Je suis comme elle"	5,001	2	Qualified
2	Corinne Colbert	"La Poupée"	4,879	3	Qualified
3	Elisabeth Jérôme	"Dans les nuages"	3,293	7	—N/a
4	Marie Myriam	"L'Oiseau et l'Enfant"	7,164	1	Qualified
5	Millie	"Un enfant peut-être"	4,332	5	—N/a
6	Primevère	"Dîtes-moi"	4,489	4	—N/a
7	Arlène	"Le cerf-volant"	3,960	6	—N/a

==== Final ====
The final took place on 6 March 1977, hosted by Evelyn Leclercq, Patrick Sébastien and Yves Lecoq. The winner was chosen by public televoting.

Final – 6 March 1977
R/O	Artist	Song	Votes	Place
1	Pierre Charby	"Chacun sa chanson d'amour"	3,562	5
2	Colin Verdier	"La Vie tu sais"	4,845	4
3	Marie Myriam	"L'Oiseau et l'Enfant"	10,178	1
4	Delfine	"Du côté de l'enfance"	6,066	3
5	Monique Pianéa	"Je suis comme elle"	2,740	6
6	Corinne Colbert	"La poupée"	7,565	2

== At Eurovision ==
On the night of the final Myriam performed last in the running order, following Belgium. France won the contest with a final total of 136 points, 15 ahead of the United Kingdom in second place.

=== Voting ===
Points awarded to France
Score	Country
12 points	Finland; Germany; Switzerland
10 points	Ireland; Israel; Italy; Luxembourg; Spain
8 points	Netherlands
7 points	Austria; Greece
6 points	Sweden; United Kingdom
5 points	Portugal
4 points	Belgium; Monaco
3 points	Norway
2 points	
1 point	

Points awarded by France
Score	Country
12 points	United Kingdom
10 points	Ireland
8 points	Netherlands
7 points	Italy
6 points	Portugal
5 points	Monaco
4 points	Finland
3 points	Greece
2 points	Israel
1 point	Germany
