= Finland in the Eurovision Song Contest 1977 =

- Eurovision Song Contest 1977
- Participating broadcaster: Yleisradio (Yle)
- Country: Finland
- Selection process: National final
- Selection date: 22 February 1977

Competing entry
- Song: "Lapponia"
- Artist: Monica Aspelund
- Songwriters: Aarno Raninen; Monica Aspelund

Placement
- Final result: 10th, 50 points

Participation chronology

Finland was represented at the Eurovision Song Contest 1977 with the song "Lapponia", composed by Aarno Raninen, with lyrics by Monica Aspelund, and performed by Aspelund herself. The Finnish participating broadcaster, Yleisradio (Yle), selected its entry through a national final.

== Before Eurovision ==
=== National final ===
Nine entries were selected for the competition from 182 received submissions. Yleisradio (Yle) held the Finnish national final on 22 January 1977 at its television studios in Helsinki, hosted by Tutteli Mensonen. The winner was chosen by seven regional juries. Each jury group consisted of 15 members.

Final – 22 January 1977
R/O	Artist	Song	Songwriter(s)	Points	Place
1	Eeva Kiviharju	"Palokankaan Maikki"	Eeva Kiviharju	291	5
2	Lasse Mårtenson	"Kuusitoista hyvää vuotta"	Lasse Mårtenson	232	7
3	Monica Aspelund	"Lapponia"	Aarno Raninen; Monica Aspelund	431	1
4	Hortto Kaalo	"Kauan sitten"	Reino Markkula; Juha Vainio	346	2
5	Seija Simola	"Yötön yö"	Erik Lindström; Kari Tuomisaari	190	9
6	Viktor Klimenko	"Luonasi oon"	Alexander Klimenko; Viktor Klimenko; Pertti Reponen	336	3
7	Markku Blomqvist	"Liehuva liekinvarsi"	Jukka Siikavire; Erkki Mäkinen	206	8
8	Finntrio	"Illalla sillalla"	Sakari Warsell	296	4
9	Mikko Alatalo and Tabula Rasa	"Rokkilaulaja"	Harri Rinne; Mikko Alatalo	273	6

== At Eurovision ==
On the night of the final Aspelund performed 16th in the running order following Italy and preceding Belgium. Aspelund was accompanied by Aarno Raninen as a pianist and a backing vocalist, and Kari Fall, Reijo Karvonen and Kari Kuusamo as backing vocalists. The Finnish entry was conducted by Ossi Runne. At the close of voting "Lapponia" had picked up 50 points, placing Finland 10th of the 18 entries.

=== Voting ===
Points awarded to Finland
Score	Country
12 points	Ireland
10 points	
8 points	Norway
7 points	Israel
6 points	Austria
5 points	Switzerland
4 points	Netherlands; France
3 points	
2 points	Greece; Sweden
1 point	

Points awarded by Finland
Score	Country
12 points	France
10 points	Switzerland
8 points	Luxembourg
7 points	Spain
6 points	Greece
5 points	Monaco
4 points	United Kingdom
3 points	Belgium
2 points	Italy
1 point	Austria
