= Chips (Irish band) =

Irish pop group

- Origin: Belfast, Northern Ireland
- Genres: Pop, MOR, folk
- Instruments: Vocals, keyboards, guitars, drums
- Years active: 1969–1983, 1989
- Labels: Decca, Rex, Spider
- Past members: Linda Martin; Annie Ferguson; Paul Lyttle; Robin Irvine; Robin Lavery; Adrian Mullen; and others, see below

Chips were an Irish pop band that were formed in Belfast in 1969 and active through the 1970s and early 1980s. They scored hits on the Irish singles chart with songs such as "Love Matters" (1975),"Goodbye Goodbye" (1977) and "David's Song" (1982). The group included Linda Martin who went on to win the 1992 Eurovision Song Contest, a competition the band themselves attempted to enter four times.

== Background ==
In 1969 a Belfast-based band by the name of The Group began going their separate ways as the lead singer had decided to leave. Manager Colin McClelland and keyboardist Bill Morrison decided to form a new band, but instead of an all-male line-up, they were keen to form a male/female group that would be geared more towards folk and pop akin to bands such as The Mamas and the Papas and The Seekers. Taking on schoolgirl Linda Martin and Annie Ferguson, the group named themselves Chips. The original line-up of the band consisted of Morrison on guitar, Robin Irvine on bass, Dick Pentland on organ, Robin Lavery on drums with Martin and Ferguson on vocals with the other members of the band also contributing to vocals to create a harmony sound. The first song that they ever performed as Chips was a cover of "Dedicated to the One I Love". Founding member Morrison left the group in 1970 and was replaced by Paul Lyttle, who would later become the driving force behind their music. During the first two years, Chips gained a reputation as being the top pop band in Belfast and were featured on a UTV documentary Spectrum in 1971. In early 1972 however, Lyttle and Martin (who were in a relationship by this time) decided to leave the band to form a new group called Lyttle People, where they could pursue a new musical direction. Following this, between 1972 and 73 the group underwent a number of line-up changes.

In October 1973, Lyttle and Martin wrapped up their band and returned to Chips. By this time the band were being managed by Peter Bardon and Lyttle focused on a new pop approach for the group. He also wrote the Irish Eurovision Song Contest entry in 1974, sung by Tina. In March 1974, other female singer Ferguson left the group and was replaced briefly by Nicola Kerr but more permanently by Irene McElroy, who would stay with the group for the rest of their career.

In 1974 the band rose to further prominence as they appeared in their own weekly television show on BBC Northern Ireland, while also making an appearance on ITV talent show Opportunity Knocks in Britain. They also issued a novelty single under the name Lily and Chips called "King Kong". The following year, they achieved their first hit in Ireland, when their single "Love Matters" reached No.6 in the Irish singles chart in April. They also made a try for a UK chart entry by appearing on BBC's Top of the Pops. Later in the year they released another hit single with the song "Twice a Week", a song in fully fledged pop territory, similar to ABBA. It reached No.13 in November. Also in this year, they worked extensively in the UK, touring with the Bay City Rollers, who were at the peak of their success at the time. The band talked about the tour in the press, remarking on the level of security at the gigs as well as the hysteria of the fans, but seemed to be going down well as support act.

In February 1976 the band made their first attempt at Eurovision by appearing in the National Song Contest. They finished second in the competition with the song "We Can Fly". At the same time they released their first (and only) album, simply titled Chips, which was produced by British hit producer Nick Tauber.The album featured the group's two recent hits as well as their latest single "I'm a Song (Sing Me)" and their contest entry.

In each of the next two years Chips made it to the national finals for the Eurovision Song Contest again. In 1977 they performed the song "Goodbye Goodbye", which made it to fourth position but became a much bigger success in the charts when it peaked at No.2, just behind the actual winning song "It's Nice to Be in Love Again" by The Swarbriggs (who also included former Chips member, Nicola Kerr). This was their biggest hit in Ireland. In 1978 they entered the song "Happy Days", also placing fourth.

A string of singles followed such as "Here in My Arms", "Automobile", "It's Over" and "New Romance (It's a Mystery)", but it wasn't until 1982 that they scored their next Irish hit with the song "David's Song", which reached No.13 in February. The following month they appeared at the National Song Contest for the fourth and last time with the song "Tissue of Lies", a song composed by member Paul Lyttle. It finished last in the contest. After this, the group issued just one more single "Hi-Lowe" towards the end of the year.

In 1983 Linda Martin competed in the Castlebar Song Contest as a solo artist with the song "Edge of the Universe", written by Shay Healy. The song won the contest and from there on, she concentrated on a solo career, effectively ending the band. The following year she also competed as a solo artist in the National Song Contest with the song "Terminal 3", which she also won and then came second in the Eurovision Song Contest 1984.

Chips continued in some form sporadically for the remainder of the decade. There were occasional shows as Martin's backing band, being billed at shows as "Linda Martin and Chips" and in 1989, briefly re-emerging with a new lead singer, Patricia Roe with the singles "Surrender" (a cover of the Jennifer Rush song) and "Will You Go".

Linda Martin went onto win Eurovision in 1992 and continued a successful solo career in Ireland and Europe. Nicola Kerr forged a career in the UK during the 1980s becoming a member of The New Seekers and performing backing vocals for a number of chart acts. Original member Robin Irvine died in 2022, and Paul Lyttle died in 2023. In 2017 the original line-up of Chips met up and performed an acoustic version of "Dedicated to the One I Love", which was uploaded to YouTube by founding member Bill Morrison.

== Discography ==
Singles:

Date	Single	Irish Charts
1971	"To-day I Killed a Man"	
1971	"Sock it To 'em Sister Nell"	
1973	"Open Your Eyes"	
1974	"King Kong"	
1974	"My World"	
1975	"Love Matters"	6
1975	"Twice a Week"	13
1975	"I'm a Song (Sing Me)"	
1977	"Goodbye Goodbye"	2
1977	"Shine a Light"	
1978	"It's Over"	
1978	"Sooner the Better"	
1978	"Here in My Arms"	
1979	"Automobile"	
1981	"New Romance (It's a Mystery)"	
1982	"David's Song"	13
1982	"Hi-Lowe"	
1989	"Surrender"	
1989	"Will You Go"	

Album:

- February 1976 – Chips
