= Hogenkamp =

Hogenkamp is a Dutch surname. Notable people with the surname include:

- Richèl Hogenkamp (born 1992), Dutch tennis player
- Wim Hogenkamp (1947–1989), Dutch actor, lyricist, and singer

== See also ==
- Hovenkamp
