= Eurovision Song Contest 1977 =

International song competition

Date and venue
- Final: 7 May 1977
- Venue: Wembley Conference Centre; London, United Kingdom

Organisation
- Organiser: European Broadcasting Union (EBU)
- Scrutineer: Clifford Brown

Production
- Host broadcaster: British Broadcasting Corporation (BBC)
- Director: Stewart Morris
- Executive producer: Bill Cotton
- Musical director: Ronnie Hazlehurst
- Presenter: Angela Rippon

Participants
- Number of entries: 18
- Returning countries: Sweden
- Non-returning countries: Yugoslavia
- Participation map: Competing countries Countries that participated in the past but not in 1977

Vote
- Voting system: Each country awarded 12, 10, 8-1 points to their 10 favourite songs
- Winning song: France "L'Oiseau et l'Enfant"

The Eurovision Song Contest 1977 was the 22nd edition of the Eurovision Song Contest, held on 7 May 1977 at the Wembley Conference Centre in London, United Kingdom, and presented by Angela Rippon. It was organised by the European Broadcasting Union (EBU) and host broadcaster the British Broadcasting Corporation (BBC), who staged the event after winning the 1976 contest for the United Kingdom with the song "Save Your Kisses for Me" by Brotherhood of Man. It was the first time the event took place in the month of May since the first contest in 1956.

Broadcasters from eighteen countries participated in the contest; Sweden returned after its absence from the previous edition, while Yugoslavia decided not to enter.

The winner was France with the song "L'Oiseau et l'Enfant", performed by Marie Myriam, written by Joe Gracy, and composed by Jean-Paul Cara. The United Kingdom, Ireland, Monaco and Greece rounded out the top five. Greece's fifth place finish was their best result up to that point. France's fifth win was also a record at the time, and one that France held onto for six years, until being equalled by Luxembourg in 1983.

== Location ==
The British Broadcasting Corporation (BBC) staged the contest at the Wembley Conference Centre. The venue was the first purpose-built conference centre in the United Kingdom, and opened on 31 January 1977—making it a newly built venue at the time. It was demolished in 2006.

At the night of the contest, 2,000 spectators were present in the audience.

=== Host selection ===
Glasgow was the first bidder for hosting the contest, with the venues either the Kelvin Hall or the King's Theatre.

== Participants ==
Eurovision Song Contest 1977 – Participation summaries by country
- Austria; Belgium; Finland; France; Germany; Greece; Ireland; Israel; Italy; Luxembourg; Monaco; Netherlands; Norway; Portugal; Spain; Sweden; Switzerland; ~~Tunisia~~; United Kingdom

Tunisia was set to participate in the contest and had been drawn to perform in the fourth running order slot, but later withdrew. Yugoslavia decided not to enter and would not return to the contest until 1981 due to bad results in the years prior, while Sweden returned to the competition, having missed out the year before. This made for eighteen participating nations.

Several of the performing artists had previously competed as lead artists representing the same country in past editions: Beatrix Neundlinger and Günter Grosslercher as part of Schmetterlinge had represented Austria in 1972 as part of Milestones; Ilanit had represented Israel in 1973; The Swarbriggs had represented Ireland in 1975; and Fernando Tordo and Paulo de Carvalho as part of Os Amigos had represented Portugal in 1973 and in 1974 respectively. In addition, Patricia Maessen, Bianca Maessen, and Stella Maessen as part of Dream Express representing Belgium, had represented the Netherlands in 1970 as Hearts of Soul; and Michèle Torr representing Monaco, had represented Luxembourg in 1966.

The language rule was brought back in this contest, four years after it had been dropped in 1973. However Germany and Belgium were allowed to sing in English, because they had already chosen the songs they were going to perform before the rule was reintroduced.

Eurovision Song Contest 1977 participants
Country	Broadcaster	Artist	Song	Language	Songwriter(s)	Conductor
Austria	ORF	Schmetterlinge	"Boom Boom Boomerang"	German, English	Schurli Herrnstadt; E. Lukas Resetarits; Willi Resetarits; Herbert Zöchling-Tampier	Christian Kolonovits
Belgium	BRT	Dream Express	"A Million in One, Two, Three"	English	Luc Smets	Alyn Ainsworth
Finland	YLE	Monica Aspelund	"Lapponia"	Finnish	Monica Aspelund; Aarno Raninen	Ossi Runne
France	TF1	Marie Myriam	"L'Oiseau et l'Enfant"	French	Jean-Paul Cara; Joe Gracy	Raymond Donnez
Germany	HR (Note: On behalf of the German public broadcasting consortium ARD)	Silver Convention	"Telegram"	English	Sylvester Levay; Michael Kunze	Ronnie Hazlehurst
Greece	ERT	Pascalis, Marianna, Robert and Bessy	"Mathema solfege" (Μάθημα σολφέζ)	Greek	Giorgos Hatzinasios; Sevi Tiliakou	Giorgos Hatzinasios
Ireland	RTÉ	The Swarbriggs Plus Two	"It's Nice to Be in Love Again"	English	Jimmy Swarbrigg; Tommy Swarbrigg	Noel Kelehan
Israel	IBA	Ilanit	"Ahava Hi Shir Lishnayim" (אהבה היא שיר לשניים)	Hebrew	Edna Peleg; Eldad Shrem	Eldad Shrem
Italy	RAI	Mia Martini	"Libera"	Italian	Luigi Albertelli; Salvatore Fabrizio	Maurizio Fabrizio
Luxembourg	CLT	Anne-Marie B	"Frère Jacques"	French	Guy Béart; Pierre Cour	Johnny Arthey
Monaco	TMC	Michèle Torr	"Une petite française"	French	Jean Albertini; Paul de Senneville; Olivier Toussaint	Yvon Rioland
Netherlands	NOS	Heddy Lester	"De mallemolen"	Dutch	Frank Affolter; Wim Hogenkamp	Harry van Hoof
Norway	NRK	Anita Skorgan	"Casanova"	Norwegian	Dag Nordtømme; Svein Strugstad	Carsten Klouman
Portugal	RTP	Os Amigos	"Portugal no coração"	Portuguese	José Carlos Ary dos Santos; Fernando Tordo	José Calvário
Spain	TVE	Micky	"Enséñame a cantar"	Spanish	Fernando Arbex	Rafael Ibarbia
Sweden	SR	Forbes	"Beatles"	Swedish	Sven-Olof Bagge; Claes Bure	Anders Berglund
Switzerland	SRG SSR	Pepe Lienhard Band	"Swiss Lady"	German	Peter Reber	Peter Jacques
United Kingdom	BBC	Lynsey de Paul and Mike Moran	"Rock Bottom"	English	Mike Moran; Lynsey de Paul	Ronnie Hazlehurst

== Format ==
The contest was originally planned to be held on 2 April 1977, but because of a strike of the BBC cameramen and its technicians, it got postponed for a month. The BBC considered moving the contest to the Television Centre, where people who work for the outside broadcast are not involved. However, it would require a guarantee by the Association of Broadcasting and Allied Staffs, which didn't come to fruition. 3 countries offered to stage the contest, including the Netherlands, which hosted last year's contest. This was the first Eurovision Song Contest to be staged in May since the inaugural edition.

Due to strikes by the BBC camera staff, and lack of time to organise the contest, there were no postcards for the viewers in between the songs. However, various shots of the contest's audience were shown, with the various countries' commentators informing the viewers of the upcoming songs. The intended postcards had been devised using footage of the artists in London during a party hosted by the BBC at a London nightclub. When the postcards were seen for the first time by the participant heads of delegation at the Friday dress rehearsal the day before the final, the Norwegian delegation objected to the way their artist was portrayed. However, as it was not possible for the BBC to edit or revise footage, all the postcards had to be dropped from the broadcast. Footage from the party still formed the interval act broadcast prior to the voting sequence.

== Contest overview ==
The following tables reflect the final official scores, verified after the contest transmission. During the voting sequence of the live show, several errors were made in the announcement of the scores, which were then adjusted after the broadcast. Both Greece and France duplicated scores, awarding the same points to multiple countries. From the Greek scores, the United Kingdom, Netherlands, Austria, and Finland all had 1 point deducted after the contest and from the French scores, Austria, Germany, Israel, Italy, and Belgium all had 1 point deducted. None of the adjustments affected the placing of any of the songs.

Results of the Eurovision Song Contest 1977
R/O	Country	Artist	Song	Points	Place
1	Ireland	The Swarbriggs Plus Two	"It's Nice to Be in Love Again"	119	3
2	Monaco	Michèle Torr	"Une petite française"	96	4
3	Netherlands	Heddy Lester	"De mallemolen"	35	12
4	Austria	Schmetterlinge	"Boom Boom Boomerang"	11	17
5	Norway	Anita Skorgan	"Casanova"	18	14
6	Germany	Silver Convention	"Telegram"	55	8
7	Luxembourg	Anne-Marie B	"Frère Jacques"	17	16
8	Portugal	Os Amigos	"Portugal no coração"	18	14
9	United Kingdom	Lynsey de Paul and Mike Moran	"Rock Bottom"	121	2
10	Greece	Pascalis, Marianna, Robert and Bessy	"Mathema solfege"	92	5
11	Israel	Ilanit	"Ahava Hi Shir Lishnayim"	49	11
12	Switzerland	Pepe Lienhard Band	"Swiss Lady"	71	6
13	Sweden	Forbes	"Beatles"	2	18
14	Spain	Micky	"Enséñame a cantar"	52	9
15	Italy	Mia Martini	"Libera"	33	13
16	Finland	Monica Aspelund	"Lapponia"	50	10
17	Belgium	Dream Express	"A Million in One, Two, Three"	69	7
18	France	Marie Myriam	"L'Oiseau et l'Enfant"	136	1

=== Spokespersons ===
Each participating broadcaster appointed a spokesperson who was responsible for announcing the votes for its respective country via telephone. Known spokespersons at the 1977 contest are listed below.

- Finland – Kaarina Pönniö
- Ireland – Brendan Balfe
- Netherlands – Ralph Inbar
- Spain – Isabel Tenaille
- Sweden – Sven Lindahl
- United Kingdom – Colin Berry

== Detailed voting results ==
Detailed voting results
		Total score	Ireland	Monaco	Netherlands	Austria	Norway	Germany	Luxembourg	Portugal	United Kingdom	Greece	Israel	Switzerland	Sweden	Spain	Italy	Finland	Belgium	France
Contestants	Ireland	119		8	1	5	12	5	8	1	12	10	12	8	12	4	8		3	10
Contestants	Monaco	96	5			8	1	6	1	6	7	12	2	6	10	8	12	5	2	5
Contestants	Netherlands	35	3	3							1	1	1	7		1			10	8
Contestants	Austria	11		5			2					3						1		
Contestants	Norway	18							3	2	2				1		5		5	
Contestants	Germany	55	1	1	3	2			2	8	8	8	5		5	5	6			1
Contestants	Luxembourg	17	2													7		8		
Contestants	Portugal	18		2	2			1						4			3			6
Contestants	United Kingdom	121		12	7	12	7	10	12	12			8		8	3	2	4	12	12
Contestants	Greece	92		10	10	4	4	4	6	10	5		3	1	7	12	1	6	6	3
Contestants	Israel	49	7	7	5	3	5							10	3	6			1	2
Contestants	Switzerland	71	6			10	10		5	4	4	6	4				4	10	8	
Contestants	Sweden	2						2												
Contestants	Spain	52			6	1		7	7		3	4		3			7	7	7	
Contestants	Italy	33	8	6				3		3				2		2		2		7
Contestants	Finland	50	12		4	6	8					2	7	5	2					4
Contestants	Belgium	69	4		12		6	8	4	7	10	5	6		4			3		
Contestants	France	136	10	4	8	7	3	12	10	5	6	7	10	12	6	10	10	12	4	

=== 12 points ===
Below is a summary of all 12 points in the final:

N.	Contestant	Nation(s) giving 12 points
6	United Kingdom	Austria, Belgium, France, Luxembourg, Monaco, Portugal
4	Ireland	Israel, Norway, Sweden, United Kingdom
3	France	Finland, Germany, Switzerland
2	Monaco	Greece, Italy
1	Belgium	Netherlands
1	Finland	Ireland
1	Greece	Spain

== Broadcasts ==
Each participating broadcaster was required to relay the contest via its networks. Non-participating EBU member broadcasters were also able to relay the contest as "passive participants". Broadcasters were able to send commentators to provide coverage of the contest in their own native language and to relay information about the artists and songs to their television viewers.

In addition to the participating countries, the contest was also reportedly broadcast in Algeria, Denmark, Iceland, Jordan, Morocco, Tunisia, Turkey, and Yugoslavia; in Bulgaria, Czechoslovakia, Hungary, Poland, Romania, and the Soviet Union via Intervision; in Canada, Japan, Hong Kong, South Africa, and the countries in South America. At least 36 television organizations were reported to broadcast the final. Estimates for the global viewership ranged from 250 to 500 million viewers.

Known details on the broadcasts in each country, including the specific broadcasting stations and commentators are shown in the tables below.

Broadcasters and commentators in participating countries
Country	Broadcaster	Channel(s)	Commentator(s)	Ref(s)
Austria	ORF	FS1	Ernst Grissemann	
Belgium	BRT	TV1	Luc Appermont	
Belgium	BRT	BRT 1		
Belgium	RTB	RTB1	Patrick Duhamel	
Belgium	RTB	RTB 2		
Finland	YLE	TV1		
Finland	YLE	Rinnakkaisohjelma	Matti Paalosmaa	
France	TF1		Georges de Caunes	
Germany	ARD	Deutsches Fernsehen	Werner Veigel	
Greece	ERT	ERT		
Ireland	RTÉ	RTÉ	Mike Murphy	
Ireland	RTÉ	RTÉ Radio	Liam Devally	
Israel	IBA	Israeli Television		
Italy	RAI	Rete Uno (Note: Delayed broadcast on 28 May 1977 at 20:40 (CET))	Silvio Noto	
Luxembourg	CLT	RTL Télé-Luxembourg		
Netherlands	NOS	Nederland 2	Ati Dijckmeester	
Netherlands	NOS	Hilversum 3		
Norway	NRK	NRK Fjernsynet	John Andreassen	
Norway	NRK	NRK (Note: Deferred broadcast at 22:20 (CET))	Erik Heyerdahl	
Portugal	RTP	I Programa		
Spain	TVE	TVE 1	Miguel de los Santos	
Sweden	SR	TV1	Ulf Elfving	
Sweden	SR	SR P3	Ursula Richter and Åke Strömmer	
Switzerland	SRG SSR	TV DRS	Theodor Haller	
Switzerland	SRG SSR	TSR	Georges Hardy	
Switzerland	SRG SSR	TSI		
Switzerland	SRG SSR	RSR 2	Robert Burnier	
Switzerland	SRG SSR	RSI 2		
United Kingdom	BBC	BBC1	Pete Murray	
United Kingdom	BBC	BBC Radio 2 (Note: Simulcast on BBC Radio 1, BBC Radio Brighton, BBC Radio Carlisle, BBC Radio Cleveland, BBC Radio Leeds, BBC Radio London, BBC Radio Medway, BBC Radio Newcastle, and BBC Radio Stoke.)	Terry Wogan	

Broadcasters and commentators in non-participating countries
Country	Broadcaster	Channel(s)	Commentator(s)	Ref(s)
Canada	CBC	CBC-FM (Note: Delayed two-part broadcast on 9 and 16 August 1977 at 13:00 (EDT))	Mieke Hollenbach	
Cyprus	CyBC	RIK		
Czechoslovakia	ČST	II. program (Note: Delayed broadcast in a shortened format on 3 June 1977 at 22:30 (CEST))		
Denmark	DR	DR TV	Claus Toksvig	
Greenland	Nuuk TV (Note: Delayed broadcast on 25 June 1977 at 20:55 (WGST))			
Hong Kong	TVB	TVB Pearl (Note: Deferred broadcast on the following day at 21:15 (HKT))		
Hong Kong	RTV	RTV-2 (Note: Deferred broadcast the following day at 21:20 (HKT))		
Hungary	MTV	MTV2 (Note: Delayed broadcast on 19 November 1977 at 21:30 (CET))		
Iceland	RÚV	Sjónvarpið (Note: Delayed broadcast on 20 May at 21:30 (WET))		
Netherlands Antilles	ATM	TeleAruba (Note: Delayed broadcast on 17 July 1977 at 15:30 (ADT))		
Netherlands Antilles	ATM	TeleCuraçao (Note: Delayed broadcast on 28 May at 23:00 (ADT))		
Poland	TP	TP1 (Note: Delayed broadcast in a shortened format on 3 June 1977 at 23:15 (CET))		
Romania	TVR	Programul 1 (Note: Delayed broadcast in a shortened format on 5 June 1977 at 21:40 (EET))		
Turkey	TRT	TRT Televizyon	Bülend Özveren	
Turkey	TRT		Ümit Tunçağ	
Yugoslavia	JRT	TV Beograd 1		
Yugoslavia	JRT	TV Koper-Capodistria		
Yugoslavia	JRT	TV Ljubljana 1 (Note: Deferred broadcast at 23:10 (CEST))		
Yugoslavia	JRT	TV Zagreb 1		

== See also ==
- OTI Festival 1977
