= United Kingdom in the Eurovision Song Contest 1977 =

- Eurovision Song Contest 1977
- Participating broadcaster: British Broadcasting Corporation (BBC)
- Country: United Kingdom
- Selection process: A Song for Europe 1977
- Selection date: 9 March 1977

Competing entry
- Song: "Rock Bottom"
- Artist: Lynsey de Paul and Mike Moran
- Songwriters: Lynsey de Paul; Michael Moran

Placement
- Final result: 2nd, 121 points

Participation chronology

The United Kingdom was represented at the Eurovision Song Contest 1977 with the song "Rock Bottom", written and performed by Lynsey de Paul and Mike Moran. The British participating broadcaster, the British Broadcasting Corporation (BBC), selected its entry through a national final. In addition, the BBC was also the host broadcaster and staged the event at the Wembley Conference Centre in London, after winning the previous edition with the song "Save Your Kisses for Me" by Brotherhood of Man.

== Before Eurovision ==
=== A Song for Europe 1977 ===
On 9 March 1977, the British Broadcasting Corporation (BBC) held at the New London Theatre the national final to select its entry, A Song for Europe 1977, presented by Terry Wogan. Minutes before the show went live, a strike by BBC cameramen was called, preventing the televised broadcast of the show. The contest went ahead and a few hours later, the audio was aired on BBC Radio 2.

Fourteen regional juries voted on the songs: Bristol, Bangor, Leeds, Norwich, Newcastle, Aberdeen, Birmingham, Manchester, Belfast, Cardiff, Plymouth, Glasgow, Southampton and London. The juries voted internally and then ranked the songs from 1–12, awarding 12 points to the song that received the highest number of votes, 11 points to the second, 10 to the third and so on down to 1 point for their least preferred song. The winning song was "Rock Bottom", written, composed and performed by Lynsey de Paul and Mike Moran. The song says that when people are in a bad situation they should work to solve problems and not be pessimistic about tragedies.

The Eurovision Song Contest 1977 was due to take place in Wembley on 2 April. Due to the cameramen's industrial action that spread throughout the BBC, many live broadcasts were affected in the coming weeks and the Eurovision final was postponed. On 30 March the strike was resolved and the contest was rescheduled for 7 May.

==== Final ====
A Song for Europe 1977 – 25 February 1977
| R/O | Artist | Song | Songwriter(s) | Points | Place |
|---|---|---|---|---|---|
| 1 | Mary Mason | "What Do You Say to Love?" | Nick Ryan; Robin Slater | 132 | 2 |
| 2 | The Foundations | "Where Were You When I Needed Your Love?" | John Macleod; David Myers | 125 | 3 |
| 3 | Tony Monopoly | "Leave a Little Love" | Alan Hawkshaw; Ray Cameron | 66 | 9 |
| 4 | Lyn Paul | "If Everybody Loved the Same as You" | Geoff Stephens; Don Black | 74 | 6 |
| 5 | High Society | "Just for You" | Ron Roker; Gerry Shury; Biddu | 74 | 6 |
| 6 | Carl Wayne | "A Little Give, a Little Take" | Roger Greenaway; Tony Macaulay | 62 | 10 |
| 7 | Lynsey de Paul and Mike Moran | "Rock Bottom" | Lynsey de Paul; Mike Moran | 143 | 1 |
| 8 | Sweet Sensation | "You're My Sweet Sensation" | Melvyn Taggart; Raymond Roberts | 73 | 8 |
| 9 | Val Stokes | "Swings and Roundabouts" | Richard Crowe; Nicholas Portlock | 57 | 12 |
| 10 | Beano | "Everybody Knows" | Freddie Phillips | 60 | 11 |
| 11 | Wesley, Park and Smith | "After All This Time" | David Mindel; Gary Benson | 106 | 5 |
| 12 | Rags | "Promises, Promises" | Richard Gillinson; David Hayes | 120 | 4 |

Regional jury votes
| R/O | Song | Belfast | Bristol | Aberdeen | Leeds | Bangor | London | Birmingham | Cardiff | Glasgow | Manchester | Southampton | Norwich | Newcastle | Plymouth | Total |
|---|---|---|---|---|---|---|---|---|---|---|---|---|---|---|---|---|
| 1 | "What Do You Say to Love?" | 7 | 10 | 10 | 10 | 11 | 9 | 12 | 10 | 9 | 7 | 6 | 12 | 10 | 9 | 132 |
| 2 | "Where Were You When I Needed Your Love?" | 10 | 11 | 8 | 4 | 10 | 8 | 7 | 7 | 11 | 11 | 7 | 9 | 12 | 10 | 125 |
| 3 | "Leave a Little Love" | 1 | 7 | 7 | 1 | 4 | 12 | 1 | 3 | 7 | 6 | 2 | 10 | 3 | 2 | 66 |
| 4 | "If Everybody Loved the Same as You" | 4 | 4 | 5 | 6 | 2 | 5 | 5 | 5 | 8 | 9 | 5 | 7 | 6 | 3 | 74 |
| 5 | "Just for You" | 11 | 1 | 3 | 8 | 9 | 6 | 2 | 2 | 6 | 4 | 4 | 1 | 9 | 8 | 74 |
| 6 | "A Little Give, a Little Take" | 5 | 6 | 6 | 7 | 7 | 4 | 4 | 4 | 1 | 1 | 9 | 3 | 1 | 4 | 62 |
| 7 | "Rock Bottom" | 12 | 12 | 12 | 12 | 12 | 11 | 8 | 9 | 12 | 3 | 12 | 5 | 11 | 12 | 143 |
| 8 | "You're My Sweet Sensation" | 2 | 5 | 4 | 2 | 3 | 10 | 3 | 6 | 2 | 8 | 8 | 6 | 7 | 7 | 73 |
| 9 | "Swings and Roundabouts" | 8 | 2 | 2 | 3 | 5 | 1 | 6 | 1 | 5 | 12 | 1 | 2 | 8 | 1 | 57 |
| 10 | "Everybody Knows" | 3 | 3 | 1 | 5 | 1 | 3 | 11 | 12 | 3 | 2 | 3 | 4 | 4 | 5 | 60 |
| 11 | "After All This Time" | 6 | 8 | 11 | 11 | 6 | 2 | 10 | 11 | 4 | 10 | 11 | 8 | 2 | 6 | 106 |
| 12 | "Promises, Promises" | 9 | 9 | 9 | 9 | 8 | 7 | 9 | 8 | 10 | 5 | 10 | 11 | 5 | 11 | 120 |
Regional jury spokespersons
Belfast – Michael Baguley; Bristol – Chris Denham; Aberdeen – Gerry Davis; Leeds – Brian Baines; Bangor – Emrys Jones; London – Ray Moore; Birmingham – David Shoot; Cardiff – Frank Lincoln; Glasgow – David Findlay; Manchester – Mike Riddoch; Southampton – Paul Harris; Norwich – Ian Masters; Newcastle – Mike Neville; Plymouth – Kevin Crooks

Lyn Paul had previously been a member of The New Seekers when they represented the UK at the Eurovision Song Contest 1972, finishing in 2nd place. The band 'Beano' would return to the competition in A Song for Europe 1980 with a change in name to 'Scramble'. Nichola Martin and Ann Shirley were the two female members of the trio 'Rags'. Both women became instrumental in the success of the Eurovision Song Contest 1981 winners Bucks Fizz. Martin herself returned in A Song for Europe 1981 with the group 'Gem' (aka Paris); ironically going up against Bucks Fizz in the competition.

== At Eurovision ==
At the Eurovision final, the UK entry was performed ninth in the running order and finished in 2nd place, a record 10th British entry to finish 2nd. The winning song reached No.19 in the UK singles chart, the last chart hit for de Paul, her first in two years. A German version of the song was released as "Für immer". De Paul and Moran did release one further single together, but it failed to chart.

Pete Murray provided the television commentary on BBC 1 and Terry Wogan provided the radio commentary on BBC Radio 2; this would be Wogan's final time he provided the contests commentary for radio, as the following year he began regularly presenting the television coverage. The contest was seen by 9.1 million viewers.

The BBC spokesperson to announce the British jury's votes was Colin Berry.

=== Voting ===
Points awarded to the United Kingdom
| Score | Country |
|---|---|
| 12 points | Austria; Belgium; France; Luxembourg; Monaco; Portugal |
| 10 points | Germany |
| 8 points | Israel; Sweden |
| 7 points | Netherlands; Norway |
| 6 points | |
| 5 points | |
| 4 points | Finland |
| 3 points | Spain |
| 2 points | Italy |
| 1 point | |

Points awarded by the United Kingdom
| Score | Country |
|---|---|
| 12 points | Ireland |
| 10 points | Belgium |
| 8 points | Germany |
| 7 points | Monaco |
| 6 points | France |
| 5 points | Greece |
| 4 points | Switzerland |
| 3 points | Spain |
| 2 points | Norway |
| 1 point | Netherlands |
