= Wim Hogenkamp =

Dutch actor, lyricist and singer

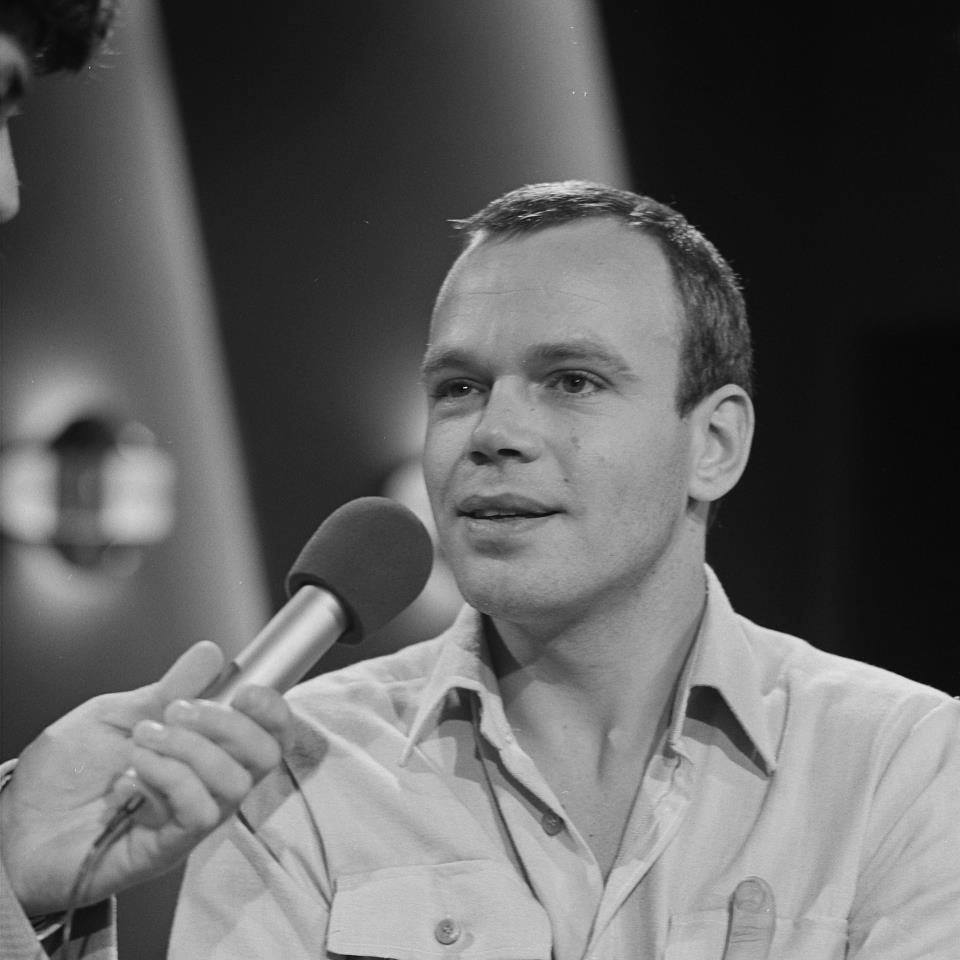

Wim Hogenkamp (Groningen, June 14, 1947 – Amsterdam, February 5, 1989) was a Dutch actor, lyricist and singer. He began his career in advertising, but after receiving drama lessons from actress Fien Berghegge he began playing small roles, especially in stage productions such as Hair and Cyrano de Bergerac. In 1974 and 1975, he posed as a dead body in Q & Q and played the role of Antonie van Slingelandt in Sil Strandjutter. In the movies, Hogenkamp was seen in A Bridge Too Far, directed by Richard Attenborough, and Pastorale 1943, directed by Wim Verstappen. In 1979, he replaced Robert Long in the musical Swingpop produced by Seth Gaaikema.

As a lyricist, he wrote lyrics for several artists: Liesbeth List, Adèle Bloemendaal, Marjol Flore, Robert Paul, Katrien Devos and Ria Valk. He wrote the lyrics for "De mallemolen" which was the Dutch entry in the 1977 Eurovision Song Contest sung by Heddy Lester. In 1982, Hogenkamp and Gerrie van der Klei wrote the first "Dutch Confusical Ball". As a performer, he appeared in two Dutch albums: Heel gewoon (1979) and Punt uit (1981). He won an Edison for Heel Gewoon and for Afscheid, sung by Louis David Price. In German he released the albums Stinknormal and Unbemerkt. Starting in 1987, he ran a theater in Amsterdam that was associated with the restaurant "De Suikerhof". He created the theater troupe Wim Hogenkamp & Partners, where he could help new actors become more well known. Some notable participants of this troupe are Margot Ros, Stan Limburg, André Breedland, Martijn Breebaart and Hilde de Mildt. One program he produced was Diner Spectacle. It included three comedians: Hanny Kroeze, Lasca ten Kate and Kamaran Abdalla. It was directed by Rob Roeleveld (and his deputy Frank Verkerk).

== Death ==
In the late eighties, Hogenkamp became infected with HIV. In early 1989, he was found shot dead in his home in Amsterdam. The circumstances surrounding his death have so far not been resolved, but received special media attention because his body was in the same position as in his role on Q & Q.

Wim Hogenkamp was cremated in Crematorium Westgaarde in Amsterdam.
