= Marko Putkonen =

Finnish opera singer

Marko Putkonen (born 18 October 1947 in Helsinki) is a Finnish opera singer with a bass background.

== Life and career ==
Putkonen is known as a singer of Hortto Kaalo, who specializes in Roma music. He is one of founding member of band Hortto Kaalo, which was founded in 1969. In the 1980s, he began his career as an opera singer. He studied singing at the Sibelius Academy's Opera School (1982–1984), the Zurich Opera Studio (1984–1985) and the Zurich Academy of Music (1985–1986), and was attached to the Zurich Opera (1985–1986) and the Finnish National Opera (1986–2002).

Putkonen's wife is a journalist and theater director Tuovi Putkonen. They have three children, a son Janus Putkonen and daughters Esma Haddas and Krista Putkonen-Örn.
