= Ireland in the Eurovision Song Contest 1977 =

- Eurovision Song Contest 1977
- Participating broadcaster: Radio Telefís Éireann (RTÉ)
- Country: Ireland
- Selection process: National Song Contest
- Selection date: 20 February 1977

Competing entry
- Song: "It's Nice to Be in Love Again"
- Artist: The Swarbriggs Plus Two
- Songwriters: Tommy Swarbrigg; Jimmy Swarbrigg

Placement
- Final result: 3rd, 119 points

Participation chronology

Ireland was represented at the Eurovision Song Contest 1977 with the song "It's Nice to Be in Love Again", written by Tommy and Jimmy Swarbrigg, and performed by themselves, along Alma Carroll and Nicola Kerr, under the stage name The Swarbriggs Plus Two. The Irish participating broadcaster, Radio Telefís Éireann (RTÉ), selected its entry through a national final. The Swarbriggs had previously represented Ireland in 1975.

== Before Eurovision ==
=== National Song Contest ===
Radio Telefís Éireann (RTÉ) held the thirteenth edition of the National Song Contest on Sunday 20 February 1977 at its studios in Dublin, hosted by Mike Murphy. Eight songs took part, with the winner chosen by voting from ten regional juries.Other participants included past and future Irish representatives Dickie Rock (1966) and Colm C. T. Wilkinson (1978), while future Eurovision winner Linda Martin (1992) performed as a member of the group Chips.

R/O	Artist	Song	Points	Place
1	Jamie Stone	"If I Give My Love"	19	2
2	Dickie Rock	"I Can't Go On Without You"	8	6
3	Sunshine	"Look Before You Leap"	0	8
4	D. J. Curtin	"You Cannot Stop The Music"	5	7
5	The Swarbriggs Plus Two	"It's Nice To Be In Love Again"	25	1
6	Denis Allen	"Da-Dum Da-Dum, I Love You So"	12	5
7	Colm C. T. Wilkinson	"There Was A Dream"	18	3
8	Chips	"Goodbye, Goodbye"	13	4

Detailed Regional Jury Votes
R/O	Song	Sligo	Waterford	Buncrana	Thurles	Carrickmacross	Cork	Dublin	Tullamore	Listowel	Galway	Total
1	"If I Give My Love"	1		2	5	1		2	2	1	5	19
2	"I Can't Go On Without You"	1		2			2			3		8
3	"Look Before You Leap"											0
4	"You Cannot Stop The Music"		2						3			5
5	"It's Nice To Be In Love Again"	3		1		7	1	2	1	6	4	25
6	"Da-Dum Da-Dum, I Love You So"	1		2	2	2	3		1		1	12
7	"There Was A Dream"	4	3	1	3			6	1			18
8	"Goodbye, Goodbye"		5	2			4		2			13

== At Eurovision ==
On the night of the final the group performed first in the running order, preceding Monaco. At the close of voting "It's Nice to Be in Love Again" had picked up 119 points, placing Ireland third of the 18 entries. The song had gained four maximum 12s – from Israel, Norway, Sweden and the United Kingdom. The Irish jury awarded its 12 points to Finland.

=== Voting ===
Points awarded to Ireland
Score	Country
12 points	Israel; Norway; Sweden; United Kingdom
10 points	France; Greece
8 points	Italy; Luxembourg; Monaco; Switzerland
7 points	
6 points	
5 points	Austria; Germany
4 points	Spain
3 points	Belgium
2 points	
1 point	Netherlands; Portugal

Points awarded by Ireland
Score	Country
12 points	Finland
10 points	France
8 points	Italy
7 points	Israel
6 points	Switzerland
5 points	Monaco
4 points	Belgium
3 points	Netherlands
2 points	Luxembourg
1 point	Germany
