= Norway in the Eurovision Song Contest 1977 =

- Eurovision Song Contest 1977
- Participating broadcaster: Norsk rikskringkasting (NRK)
- Country: Norway
- Selection process: Melodi Grand Prix 1977
- Selection date: 19 February 1977

Competing entry
- Song: "Casanova"
- Artist: Anita Skorgan
- Songwriters: Svein Strugstad; Dag Nordtømme

Placement
- Final result: 14th, 18 points

Participation chronology

Norway was represented at the Eurovision Song Contest 1977 with the song "Casanova", composed by Svein Strugstad, with lyrics by Dag Nordtømme, and performed by Anita Skorgan. The Norwegian participating broadcaster, Norsk rikskringkasting (NRK), selected its entry through Melodi Grand Prix 1977. This was the first of three Eurovision appearances (and a further uncredited fourth) for Skorgan.

== Before Eurovision ==
=== Melodi Grand Prix 1977 ===
==== Format ====
The format of Melodi Grand Prix 1977 was a lot less centralised than in previous editions. It consisted of each county being assigned to one of five districts with each district providing their own entries to a final. The final would then have six songs, one from each district but two from the district with the Eastern counties. Each district was able to dictate the format of their own semi-finals. These semi-finals were broadcast on regional radio. The North, South, West, and Central Districts had semi-finals with four songs each, while the Eastern District had six songs in their semi-final.

Melodi Grand Prix 1977 Districts
District	Region	Counties	District Office
1	North	Finnmark; Nordland; Troms	Tromsø
2	Central	Møre og Romsdal; Nord-Trøndelag; Sør-Trøndelag	Trondheim
3	West	Hordaland; Sogn og Fjordane	Bergen
4	South	Aust-Agder; Rogaland; Vest-Agder	Kristiansand
5	East	Akershus; Buskerud; Hedmark; Oppland; Oslo; Østfold; Telemark; Vestfold	Oslo

==== Competing entries ====
Norsk rikskringkasting (NRK) opened a submission period for entries which lasted from 16 November 1976 until 10 December 1976. Interested artists were required to send their entries not to NRK but to their respective District Offices. A total of 348 entries were received by the districts and a 3-member jury in each district chose the entries for their district's semi-final.

Entry selection jury members
District	Region	Jury Members	Entries
1	North	Ivar Antonsen, Bernt Johan Otten, Egil Pettersen	25
2	Central	Asmund Bjørken, Ivar Gafseth, Henning Sommerro	40
3	West	Ruth Bakke, Morten Kvelstad, Anders Skjold	48
4	South	Finn Ralph Andersen, Alexander Gluck, Sigurd Undsæth Levland	36
5	East	Lillemor Ekeland Bakke, Elisabeth Grannemann, Tor Hultin	199

Competing entries
District	Region	Song	Songwriter(s)
1	North	"Ikke mitt bord"	Axel Gran
1	North	"Luta lei"	Jarle Okstad
1	North	"Ro i motvind"	Axel Gran
1	North	"Tvilen er vårt liv"	Kjell Pettersen; Kjell Hugo Bjerkaas
2	Central	"Casanova"	Svein Strugstad; Dag Nordtømme
2	Central	"Salomo"	Gunnar Berg
2	Central	Unknown	
2	Central	Unknown	
3	West	"For seint?"	Unknown
3	West	"Robåtrock"	Nils Abrahamsen; John Steffensen; Øyvind Pedersen
3	West	"Tidig"	Ove Thue
3	West	"Vi trenger kjærlighet på vår jord"	Unknown
4	South	"Går her og håper"	Unknown
4	South	"Jonathan"	Erik Jarlsby; Torkjel Rygnestad
4	South	"Mellomspill i regn"	Unknown
4	South	"Storbyjungel"	Unknown
5	East	"Det er hans land"	Kristian Lindemann; Jan Eggum
5	East	"Mærra hass Ka'l"	Helge Stenersen
5	East	"Make Love Not War"	Kåre Grøttum; Bjørn Rønningens
5	East	"Poker"	Frode Thingnes; Phillip Kruse
5	East	"Sang"	Mette Hurlen
5	East	"Springaren"	Petter Hurlen

==== Regional semi-finals ====
===== North =====
The competing entries of the Northern District semi-final were broadcast on 14 January 1977, in a show hosted by Leif Erik Forberg, after which the public was able to send in postcard votes until 19 January 1977. The four entries were recorded by either Turid Pedersen or Kristen Lyngedal and were accompanied by Kurt Samuelsen's quartet, who also arranged all four competing entries. The winner of the semi-final was announced on 21 January 1977.

North District - 14 January 1977
R/O	Artist	Song	Votes	Place	Result
1	Kristen Lyngedal	"Luta lei"	172	3	—N/a
2	Kristen Lyngedal	"Ro i motvind"	45	4	—N/a
3	Turid Pedersen	"Tvilen er vårt liv"	212	2	—N/a
4	Turid Pedersen	"Ikke mitt bord"	236	1	Qualified

===== Central =====
The competing entries of the Central District semi-final were broadcast on 14 January 1977, after which the public was able to send in postcard votes until 19 January 1977. The winner of the semi-final was announced on 21 January 1977.

Central District - 14 January 1977
R/O	Artist	Song	Votes	Place	Result
		"Casanova"	601	1	Qualified
		"Salomo"	489	2	—N/a
				3	—N/a
				4	—N/a

===== West =====
The competing entries of the Western District semi-final were broadcast twice, on 13 January and 17 January 1977, after which the public was able to send in postcard votes until 19 January 1977. All four entries were recorded by either Ellen Margrethe Johansen or Helge Nilsen and were arranged by Brødrene Thue. The winner of the semi-final was announced on 21 January 1977.

West District - 13/17 January 1977
R/O	Artist	Song	Votes	Place	Result
		"For seint?"			—N/a
		"Tidig"		2	—N/a
3	Helge Nilsen	"Robåtrock"		1	Qualified
4		"Vi trenger kjærlighet på vår jord"			—N/a

===== South =====
The competing entries of the South District semi-final were broadcast on 10 January 1977, in a show hosted by Julius Hougen, after which the public was able to send in postcard votes until 19 January 1977. All four entries were recorded by either Hans Petter Hansen or Magne Høyland and were arranged by Håkon Berge. The winner of the semi-final was announced on 21 January 1977.

South District - 10 January 1977
R/O	Artist	Song	Votes	Place	Result
1	Hans Petter Hansen	"Går her og håper"			—N/a
2	Hans Petter Hansen	"Jonathan"		1	Qualified
3	Magne Høyland	"Storbyjungel"			—N/a
4	Magne Høyland	"Mellomspill i regn"			—N/a

===== East =====
The competing entries of the East District semi-final were broadcast on 13 January 1977, after which the public was able to send in postcard votes until 19 January 1977. The entries were recorded by Benny Borg, Nora Brockstedt, and Kirsti Sparboe, with Roy Hellvin's quartet, who also arranged all six competing entries. Around 1,300 votes were received and the winners of the semi-final were announced on 21 January 1977.

East District - 13 January 1977
R/O	Artist	Song	Votes	Place	Result
1	Kirsti Sparboe and Benny Borg	"Poker"		3	—N/a
2	Nora Brockstedt	"Mærra hass Ka'l"		5	—N/a
3	Kirsti Sparboe	"Det er hans land"		4	—N/a
4	Benny Borg	"Make Love Not War"	24.6%	1	Qualified
5	Kirsti Sparboe and Benny Borg	"Sang"		2	Qualified
6	Nora Brockstedt	"Springaren"		6	—N/a

==== Final ====
Prior to the final, the entries were broadcast two at a time in the show Lørdagslag on 29 January, 5 February, and 12 February 1977. The final was held during a special edition of Lørdagslag on 19 February 1977. The competition took place the studios of NRK studios in Oslo and was hosted by Vidar Lønn-Arnesen. The orchestra was conducted by Carsten Klouman. Every song, with the exception of "Sang", was performed by a different singer than in the regional radio semi-finals. The results were decided by regional juries consisting of 8 to 10 members each.

Final – 19 February 1977
R/O	Artist	Song	Points	Place
1	Rune Larsen	"Robåtrock"	59	2
2	Dag Spantell	"Jonathan"	42	5
3	Odd Børre	"Make Love Not War"	25	6
4	Anita Skorgan	"Casanova"	91	1
5	Axel Gran	"Ikke mitt bord"	55	4
6	Kirsti Sparboe and Benny Borg	"Sang"	58	3

Detailed regional jury votes
R/O	Song	Tromsø	Trondheim	Bergen	Kristiansand	Lillehammer	Oslo	Total
1	"Robåt rock"	14	15		10	2	18	59
2	"Jonathan"	11	5	3		16	7	42
3	"Make Love Not War"	3	8	3	8	3		25
4	"Casanova"	13		12	30	32	4	91
5	"Ikke mitt bord"		6	32	1	2	14	55
6	"Sang"	14	21	5	6		12	58

== At Eurovision ==
On the night of the final Skorgan performed 5th in the running order, following Austria and preceding Germany. At the close of voting "Casanova" had picked up 18 points, placing Norway joint 14th of the 18 entries. The Norwegian jury awarded its 12 points to Ireland.

=== Voting ===
Points awarded to Norway
Score	Country
12 points	
10 points	
8 points	
7 points	
6 points	
5 points	Belgium; Italy
4 points	
3 points	Luxembourg
2 points	Portugal; United Kingdom
1 point	Sweden

Points awarded by Norway
Score	Country
12 points	Ireland
10 points	Switzerland
8 points	Finland
7 points	United Kingdom
6 points	Belgium
5 points	Israel
4 points	Greece
3 points	France
2 points	Austria
1 point	Monaco
