= Micky (Spanish singer) =

Spanish singer (born 1943)

- Also known as: El Hombre de Goma ("The Rubber Man")
- Born: Miguel Ángel Carreño Schmelter; 20 October 1943 (age 82); Madrid, Spain
- Genres: Rock, Pop
- Instruments: Vocal, Harmonica

Miguel Ángel Carreño Schmelter (born 20 October 1943, in Madrid), better known as Micky, is a Spanish singer.

He began his music career in 1962 leading the band Micky y Los Tonys, which brought out 30 singles (including hits like "No sé nadar") and 5 albums. Meanwhile, Micky acted in some films as it was usual for singers in Spain in the 1960s and worked for Cadena SER as a radio presenter.

Micky began his solo music career in the 1970s. Some of his first hits were "Soy así" and "El chico de la armónica". The single "Bye bye fräulein" (1976) entered the charts in Germany, Luxembourg, and the Netherlands, and made the Billboard Easy Listening charts in the United States. In 1977 he was chosen to participate for Spain at the Eurovision Song Contest 1977. With the song "Enséñame a cantar", he placed 9th in a field of 18 entries.

In the 1980s and 1990s, he continued his music career but also focusing on theatre and television. In 2003 he participated in the television contest Vivo Cantando, which featured former pop stars. In 2010 he released a new album, La Cuenta Atrás.

| Preceded by Braulio with "Sobran las palabras" | Spain in the Eurovision Song Contest; 1977 | Succeeded by José Vélez with "Bailemos un vals" |
