= Hovenkamp =

Hovenkamp is a surname of Dutch origin. Notable people with the surname include:

- Eva Hovenkamp (born 1996), Dutch sprinter
- Herbert Hovenkamp (born 1948), American legal academic
- Hugo Hovenkamp (born 1950), Dutch footballer

== See also ==
- Hogenkamp
