= Pepe Lienhard =

Swiss bandleader and musician

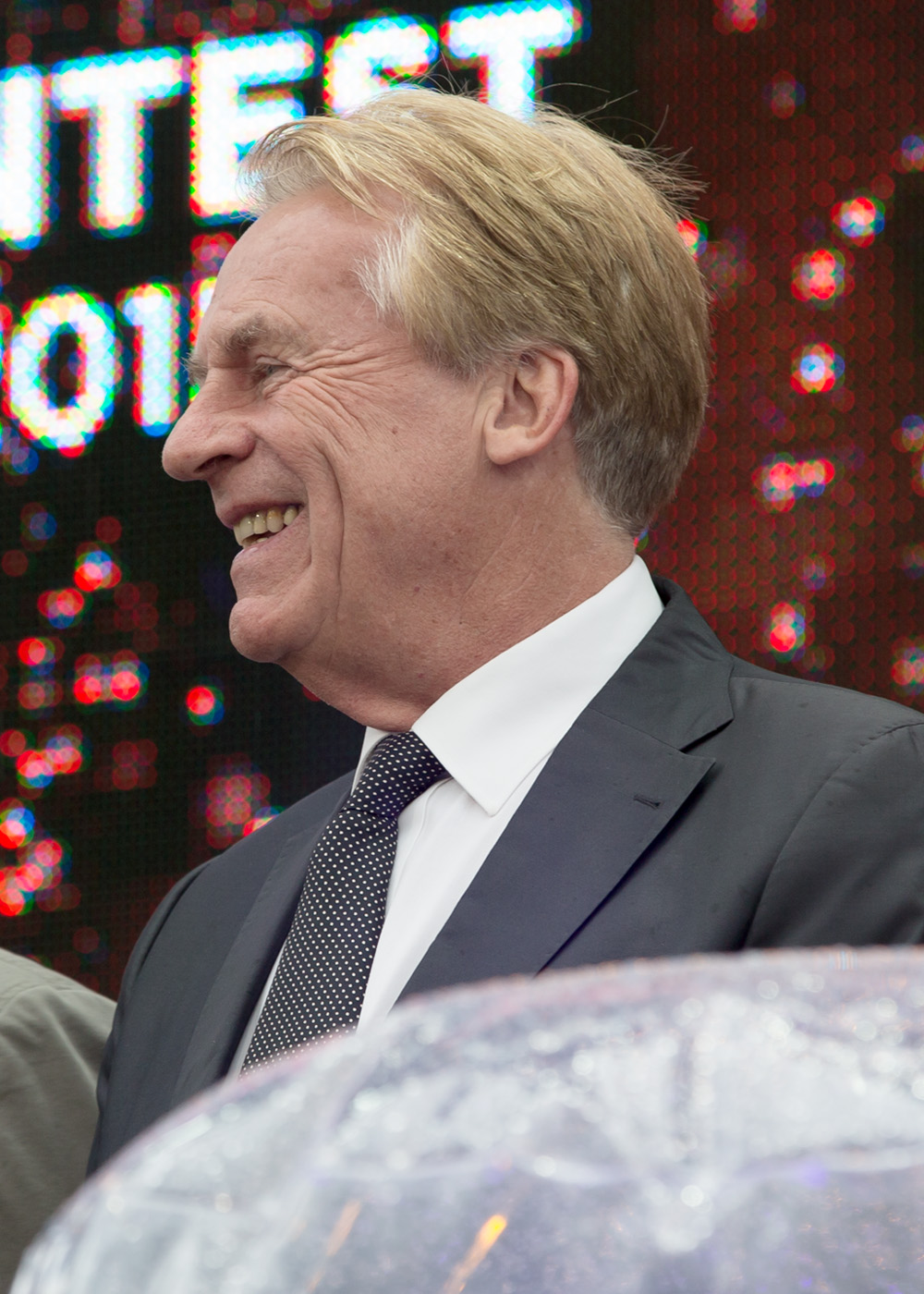
Pepe Lienhard

Pepe Lienhard (born Peter Rudolf Lienhard; 23 March 1946 in Lenzburg) is a Swiss bandleader and musician.

== Life ==
Lienhard started a band called "The College Stompers" while he was still in school. He studied law at university but left without a degree in 1969 and founded a professional big band sextet, the Pepe Lienhard Band, with which he released numerous albums. Their first success came with "Sheila Baby". The group came sixth place at the Eurovision Song Contest 1977 with the song "Swiss Lady".

The band accompanied Udo Jürgens on his tours from 1982 and made several appearances with other stars such as Sammy Davis Jr. and Frank Sinatra.

In a collaboration with the trio of sibling composers Diego Baldenweg with Nora Baldenweg and Lionel Baldenweg, he played the saxophone parts for the score to Rolf Lyssy's feature film "Die Letzte Pointe" (The Final Touch). The soundtrack was awarded with Finalist «Best Feature Film Score» at the Music + Sound Awards (International).

In addition to his continued performances, Lienhard composes arrangements in a variety of styles.

== Successful songs ==
- "Sheila Baby"
- "Swiss Lady"
- "My Honeybee"

== Discography ==
- Saxy LiebesTraum

Awards and achievements
Preceded by Peter, Sue and Marc with "Djambo, Djambo"	Switzerland in the Eurovision Song Contest; 1977	Succeeded by Carole Vinci with "Vivre"
