= Jean-Paul Cara =

French singer and composer

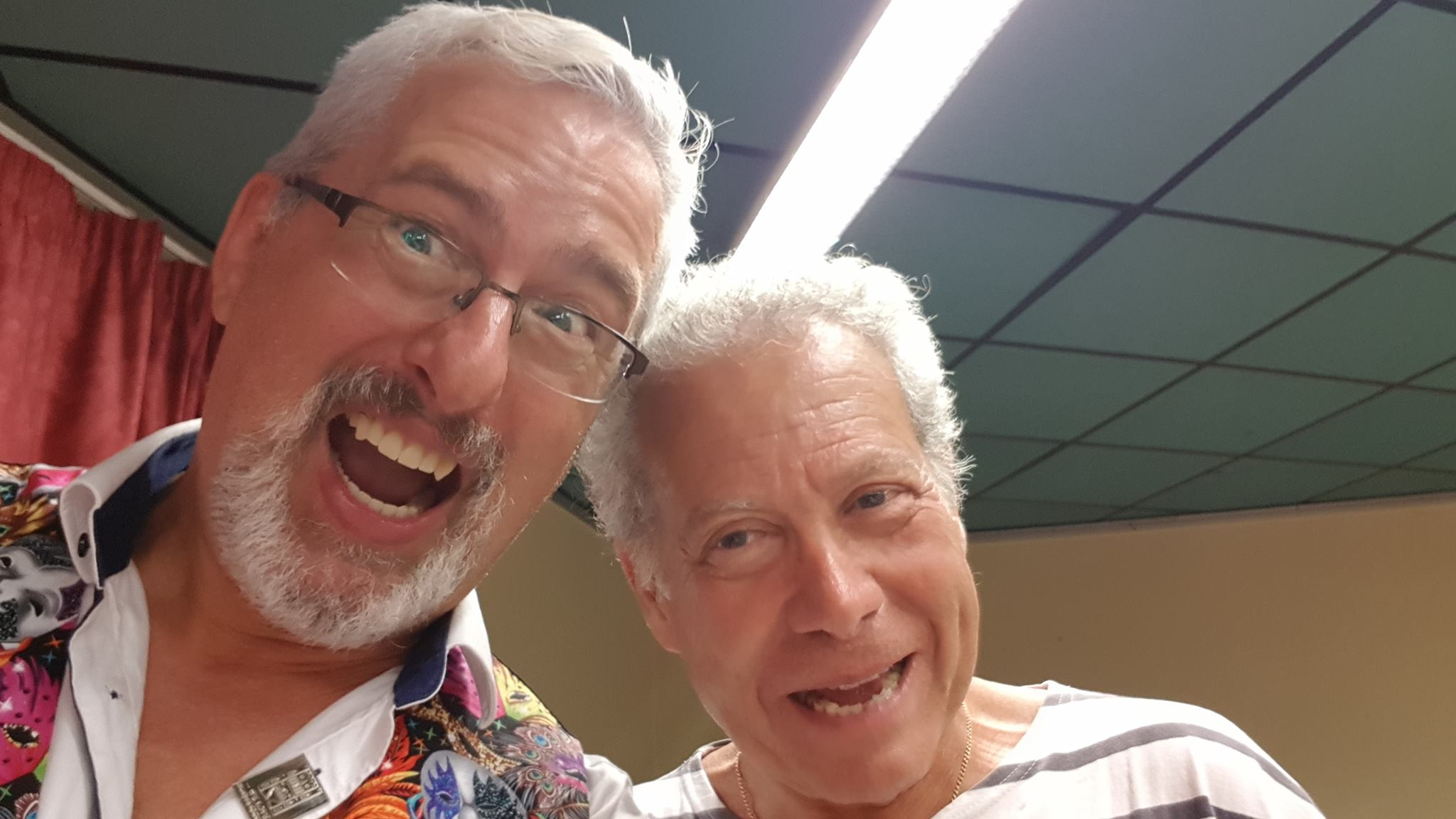
James E Sheen (left) meeting Jean Paul Cara (right) 2016

Jean-Paul Cara (born 9 September 1948) is a French singer and composer. He has authored several songs that have won prizes at the Eurovision Song Contest, most notably the single "L'Oiseau et l'Enfant" in collaboration with Joe Gracy and performed by Marie Myriam (1st place, France 1977).

France has not won a Eurovision since. Cara wrote the song "Un, deux, trois", performed by Catherine Ferry, that came in 2nd place (France 1976). He collaborated with Pierre Delanoë on the French lyrics for the song "Ein bißchen Frieden", composed by Ralph Siegel, that won 1st place (Germany 1982). His 1980 on-stage performance, taking part in Sophie et Magaly's entry of "Papa Pingouin" (Luxembourg 1980), granted them 9th place with 56 points.

In January 2010 Jean-Paul Cara was named an Officier in the Ordre des Arts et des Lettres. He lives in Nébian, France and continues to perform.
