= The Swarbriggs =

Irish musical duo and music promoters

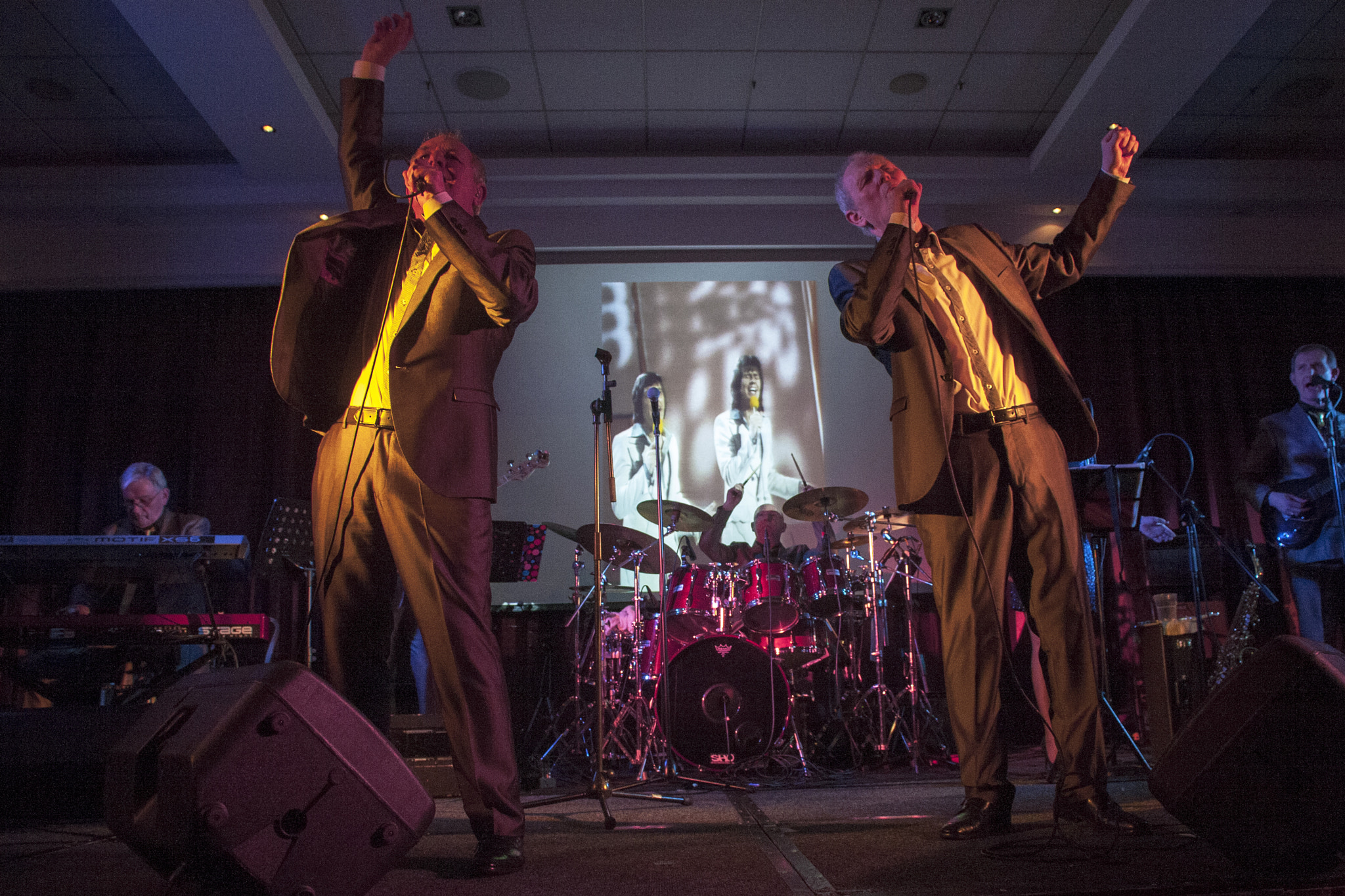
The Swarbriggs in concert

Thomas "Tommy" Swarbrigg and John James "Jimmy" Swarbrigg are Irish music promoters and former pop musicians. As The Swarbriggs, they represented Ireland at the Eurovision Song Contest 1975 with "That's What Friends Are For". As The Swarbriggs Plus Two, with Nicola Kerr and Alma Carroll, they competed again in 1977 with "It's Nice To Be In Love Again". The brothers wrote both songs.

They also scored numerous other top 20 chart hit singles in Ireland during the 1970s, including "Joanne" (a No. 1 hit in 1976), "Looking Through The Eyes of a Beautiful Girl", "If Ma Could See Me Now", "Funny" and many more. They had over 20 top 20 Chart Entries through the 1970s, which were all self composed.

== Early years ==
From 1962, Tommy played trumpet with Joe Dolan's showband, The Drifters (not to be confused with the American group). In 1969 he and the other backing musicians left to form The Times Showband, with Jimmy added as lead vocalist. The brothers wrote their own compositions, which was unusual for a showband, and they scored numerous hit singles in Ireland. By 1973 they had their own television show on Raidió Teilifís Éireann and worked independently of the showband, leaving altogether in 1975, the first year they competed in the Eurovision.

Jimmy Swarbrigg claims that they would have won the Eurovision Song Contest 1977 if not for political voting motivated by a dispute over fishing rights. They ended up placing third that year.

== Musical promotion and management ==
They retired as performers in 1980 and In later years they had various business ventures, including promoting concerts in Ireland for various Irish and foreign artists, including Smokie, Leo Sayer, Meat Loaf (three tours), The (American) Drifters, Jack L, Albert Hammond, Dermot Morgan, and Richie Kavanagh.

== Legacy ==
The brothers were attributed as the inspiration for the 'My Lovely Horse' music video in the channel 4 television series Father Ted.

The re-written song of The Swarbriggs "If Ma Could See Me Now" was heard from the 2002–2008 Mrs Brown's Boys direct-to-video film series in Ireland.

Awards and achievements
Preceded by Tina Reynolds with "Cross Your Heart"	Ireland in the Eurovision Song Contest; 1975	Succeeded by Red Hurley with "When"
Preceded by Red Hurley with "When"	Ireland in the Eurovision Song Contest; 1977	Succeeded by Colm Wilkinson with "Born to Sing"
