= Monica Aspelund =

Finnish singer (born 1946)

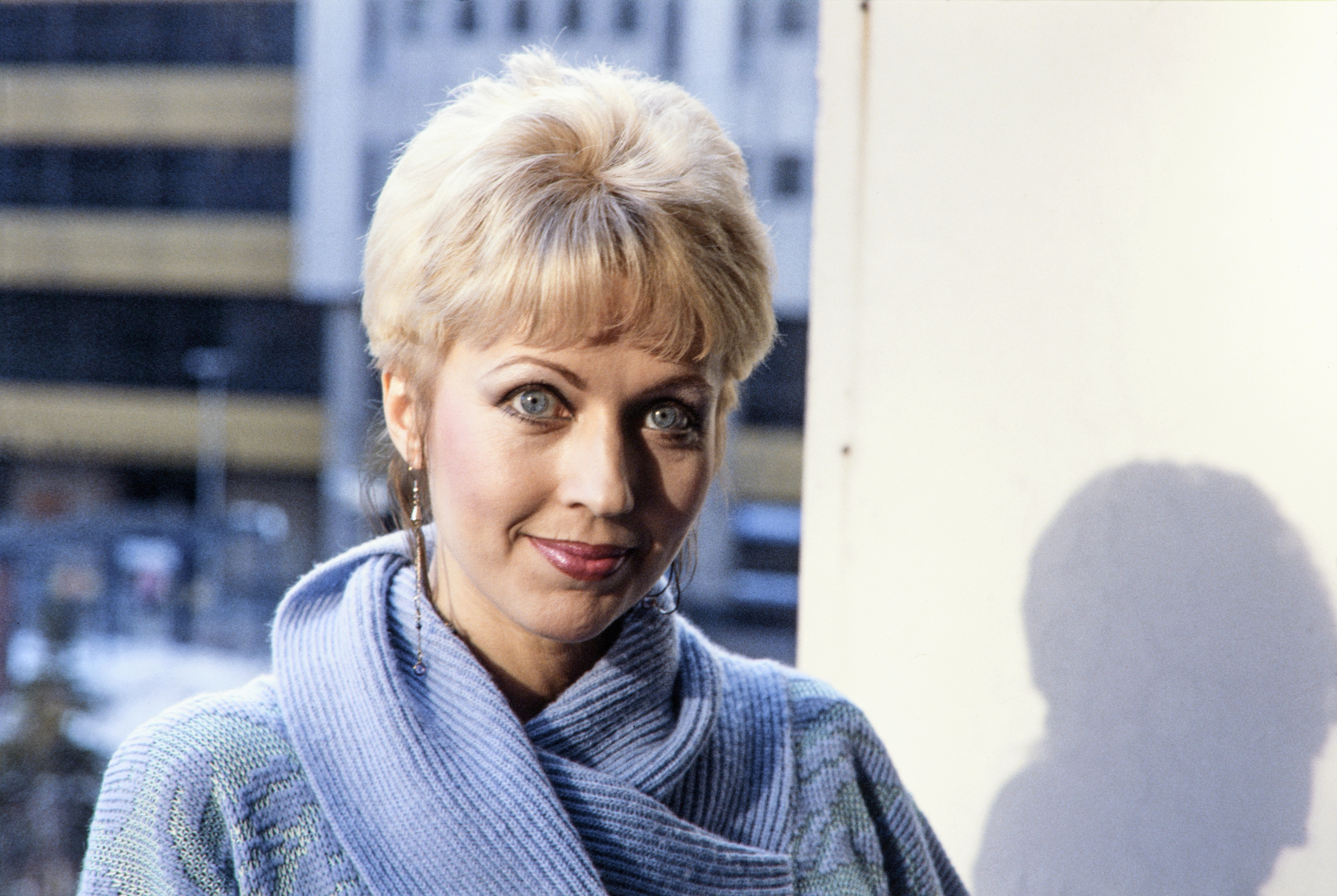
- Monica Aspelund in 1987

Background information
- Born: Monica Helena Aspelund; 16 January 1946 (age 80); Vaasa, Finland
- Years active: 1960–present
- Formerly of: Family Four

Monica Helena Aspelund (born 16 January 1946) is a Finnish singer. She is the older sister of Ami Aspelund.

== Life and career ==
Born in Vaasa into a family of Swedish speaking Finns, Aspelund danced and sang in talent shows from an early age, making her recording debut at age fourteen with "Katso, kenguru loikkaa" a children's song recorded in the autumn of 1960. Aspelund's subsequent singles included Finnish language covers of international hits such as "Tahdon kaikki kirjeet takaisin" ("I'm Gonna Knock on Your Door" - Eddie Hodges, 1961), Lady Sunshine ja Mister Moon" ("Lady Sunshine und Mister Moon" - Conny Froboess, 1962) and "En ilman häntä olla voi" ("I Couldn't Live Without Your Love" - Petula Clark, 1966). As a young woman Aspelund worked as a commercial artist not embarking on a full-time singing career until 1973 when her recordings included a Finnish cover of the Ireen Sheer hit "Goodbye Mama". Also in 1973 Aspelund spent time in Sweden as a member of the group Family Four. In 1974 Aspelund had her first album release, Valkoiset laivat – Sininen meri, a specialty recording commissioned by the Silja Line comprising performances of nautical themed songs by Aspelund and Kai Lind.

Aspelund had been collaborating with Aarno Raninen from 1970 and in 1975 Aspelund had her first mainstream album release with the Monica & Aaron Raninen Orkesteri. The album included "Fasten Seatbelts", which was Aspelund's first entry in the Finnish national preliminary of the Eurovision Song Contest. Aspelund again competed in the Finnish national preliminary for Eurovision in 1976, with the song "Joiku". Aspelund finally won that competition in 1977, with "Lapponia", which at the Eurovision 1977 final held on 7 May 1977, was placed tenth in a field of eighteen. The song's moderate Eurovision placing did not preclude its release in twenty European countries, as well as Australia, Brazil, Israel and Turkey, via the recordings Aspelund made of the song in Dutch, English, French, German and Swedish as well as Finnish. "Lapponia" afforded Aspelund a number 5 hit in Finland and the record also reached number 20 in Sweden. Aspelund again competed in the Finnish national preliminary for Eurovision in 1978 with "Kultaa hopeaa", and with the same song in the Intervision Song Contest and also the Menschen Und Meer Song Festival, taking first place in the last-named competition.

On 30 September 1978, Aspelund was a passenger aboard Finnair Flight 405, which was hijacked by a lone gunman. Aspelund and the rest of the passengers and crew were freed when the hijacker departed from the plane.

Circa 1980 Aspelund, who had just been divorced, relocated with her two-year-old son to Lake Worth, Florida. She performed locally and on Caribbean cruise ships making periodic visits to Finland and Sweden, notably in 1986 when she headlined in the stage musical Cats in Helsinki. It was reported in 2010 that Aspelund had recently returned to Finland on a permanent basis.

== Discography ==
=== Albums ===
- Valkoiset laivat – Sininen meri (Silja Line 1974, Kai Lind)
- Monica ja Aarno Ranisen orkesteri (RCA, 1975)
- Credo – minä uskon (RCA 1975, Ami Aspelund)
- Lapponia (RCA, 1977)
- En karneval (RCA, 1978)
- Laulut ne elämää on (RCA, 1979)
- Valentino's Day (Swe Disc, 1979)

=== Singles ===
- "Katso kenguru loikkaa" / "Kaupungilla juorutaan" (1960)
- "En tiedä" / "Nostakaa ankkurit" (1960)
- "Se on hän" / "Jodel boogie" (1961)
- "Tahdon kaikki kirjeet takaisin" / "Kanssas onneen taas mä astelen" (1961)
- "Hallo hallo hallo" / "Tina ja Marina" (1962)
- "Lady sunshine and mr. moon" / "Tyttö ja raudikko" (1962)
- "Rinnakkain" / "Lauantaina kalastamaan" (1963)
- "Aaveet suolla" / "En pikkusisko olekaan" (1963)
- "Esko kaapissa" / "Kolmas pyörä" (1964)
- "Sua ilman ei lauluni soi" / "Porojen jenkka" (1964)
- "En enää usko rakkauteen" / "Taikakeinu" (1965)
- "En ilman häntä olla voi" / "Espanjalainen kirppu" (1966)
- "Kortin saat sä jostakin" / "Vain rakkaus sen aikaan saa" (1973)
- "Hasta manana" / "Honey honey" (1974)
- "Joiku" /" Maailmantäysi aikaa" (1976)
- "Lapponia" / "La la laula laulu" (1977)
- "Lapponia" / "La la sjung en sång" (1977)
- "Lapponia" / "La la sing a song" (1977)
- "Laponie" / "Chante avec moi" (1977)
- "Lapponia" / "So bist du" (1977)
- "That is the name of the game" / "Valentino's day" (1978)
- "Beating booming" / "Valentino's day" (1978)
- "Golden Christmas" / "Tule joulu kultainen" (1979)
- "Par avion" / "Sulan syliisi" (1980)

Preceded by Fredi with Pump-Pump	Finland in the Eurovision Song Contest; 1977	Succeeded by Seija Simola with Anna rakkaudelle tilaisuus
