= Belgium in the Eurovision Song Contest 1977 =

- Eurovision Song Contest 1977
- Participating broadcaster: Belgische Radio- en Televisieomroep (BRT)
- Country: Belgium
- Selection process: Eurosong 1977
- Selection date: 5 February 1977

Competing entry
- Song: "A Million in One, Two, Three"
- Artist: Dream Express
- Songwriter: Luc Smets

Placement
- Final result: 7th, 69 points

Participation chronology

Belgium was represented at the Eurovision Song Contest 1977 with the song "A Million in One, Two, Three", written by Luc Smets, and performed by Dream Express. The Belgian participating broadcaster, Flemish Belgische Radio- en Televisieomroep (BRT), selected its entry through a national final.

== Before Eurovision ==
=== Eurosong 1977 ===
==== Format ====
Since the last three winners of the Eurovision Song Contest had been pop songs sung in the English language by a nationally famous group, the Flemish broadcaster Belgische Radio- en Televisieomroep (BRT) used this as inspiration for Eurosong 1977. Three pop groups were chosen for Eurosong 1977: Two Man Sound, Trinity, and Dream Express.

The original format for the national final involved each group performing one song each. The best song would then be chosen and would be performed by all three groups, whereby the best combination of artist and song would win Eurosong 1977. This was the same as the format used in Nationaal Songfestival 1975, the Dutch national final for the Eurovision Song Contest 1975. However, Dream Express protested this and a new format for Eurosong 1977 was created: Each group received their own programme, where three songs would be presented and two would qualify to the final. In the final, the top song from each group would go to a second round and then the overall winner would be decided.

Competing entries
Artist	Song	Songwriter(s)
Two Man Sound	"Bye Bye Love"	Sylvain Vanholme
Two Man Sound	"Dancing Man"	Francis Deprijck; Sylvain Vanholme
Two Man Sound	"It's Wonderful"	Sylvaine Vanholme; Penny Els
Dream Express	"A Million in One, Two, Three"	Luc Smets
Dream Express	"Sold It for a Song"	Luc Smets
Dream Express	"Spinning Top"	R. Cane
Trinity	"Drop Drop Drop"	Fred Beekmans; Bob Baelemans
Trinity	"Go Get Your Mother"	Fred Beekmans; Bob Baelemans; Hans van Hemert
Trinity	"Let Your Love Shine On"	Hans van Hemert

==== Semi-finals ====
The semi-finals were held in the Amerikaans Theater in Brussels and were hosted by Luc Appermont. The semi-finals were recorded one week in advance. In each semi-final, the group performed their biggest hits and their three candidate songs, which were voted on by a 192-member jury in the audience. The audience jury was selected from a BRT study to ensure that it was diverse in age and gender. Each jury member voted by giving a score between 1 and 6 to each song and the lowest-scoring song was eliminated from each semi-final.

Semi-final 1 – Two Man Sound – 15 January 1977
R/O	Song	Points	Place	Result
1	"Dancing Man"	842	2	Qualified
2	"It's Wonderful"	761	3	—N/a
3	"Bye Bye Love"	1,014	1	Qualified

Semi-final 2 – Trinity – 22 January 1977
R/O	Song	Points	Place	Result
1	"Go Get Your Mother"	876	2	Qualified
2	"Let Your Love Shine On"	791	3	—N/a
3	"Drop Drop Drop"	1,075	1	Qualified

Semi-final 3 – Dream Express – 29 January 1977
R/O	Song	Points	Place	Result
1	"A Million in One, Two, Three"	978	2	Qualified
2	"Sold It for a Song"	1,006	1	Qualified
3	"Spinning Top"	745	3	—N/a

==== Final ====
The final was broadcast live on 5 February 1977 in the Amerikaans Theater in Brussels and was hosted by Luc Appermont. Voting was done by the same 192-member audience jury from the semi-finals and in the same method. In the first round, each group performed their two songs and the highest scoring song qualified to the next round. The points from the first round weren't revealed until after the show in order to not bias the jury. In the second round, each group performed their song and the highest scoring song won.

The winner of Eurosong 1977 was "A Million in One, Two, Three" by Dream Express. After the announcement of the results, Dream Express fans stormed the stage and Luc Appermont struggled to close the show.

First Round – 5 February 1977
R/O	Artist	Song	Points	Result
1	Two Man Sound	"Dancing Man"	808	Advanced
2	Two Man Sound	"Bye Bye Love"	740	—N/a
3	Dream Express	"A Million in One, Two, Three"	947	Advanced
4	Dream Express	"Sold It for a Song"	922	—N/a
5	Trinity	"Go Get Your Mother"	860	—N/a
6	Trinity	"Drop Drop Drop"	933	Advanced

Second Round – 5 February 1977
R/O	Artist	Song	Points	Place
1	Two Man Sound	"Dancing Man"	812	3
2	Dream Express	"A Million in One, Two, Three"	984	1
3	Trinity	"Drop Drop Drop"	932	2

== At Eurovision ==
The free-language rule which had applied in Eurovision between 1973 and 1976 was abolished by the European Broadcasting Union before the 1977 contest and participants were now obliged once again to perform in an official language of their country. However, as Belgium (along with Germany) were already too far into their selection process, they were given dispensation to perform in English.

On the night of the final Dream Express performed 17th in the running order, following Finland and preceding the eventual winner France. At the close of the voting "A Million in One, Two, Three" had received 69 votes from 11 countries (including the maximum 12 from The Netherlands and 10 from the United Kingdom), placing Belgium 7th of the 18 entries. The Belgian jury awarded its 12 points to the United Kingdom.

=== Voting ===
Points awarded to Belgium
Score	Country
12 points	Netherlands
10 points	United Kingdom
8 points	Germany
7 points	Portugal
6 points	Israel; Norway
5 points	Greece
4 points	Ireland; Luxembourg; Sweden
3 points	Finland
2 points	
1 point	

Points awarded by Belgium
Score	Country
12 points	United Kingdom
10 points	Netherlands
8 points	Switzerland
7 points	Spain
6 points	Greece
5 points	Norway
4 points	France
3 points	Ireland
2 points	Monaco
1 point	Israel
