= Heddy Lester =

Dutch singer and actress (1950–2023)

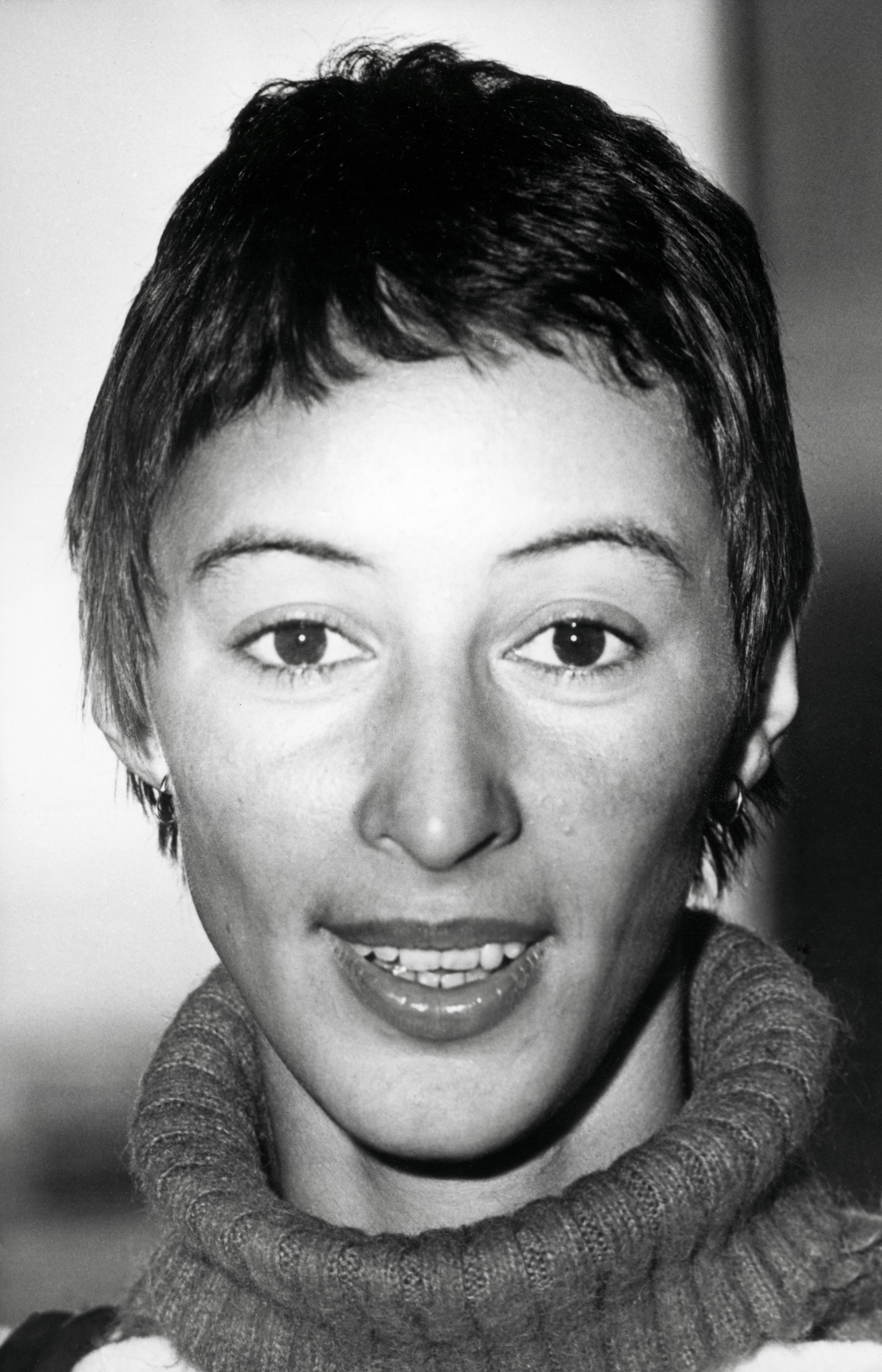
- Lester in 1977

Background information
- Born: Hendrika Georziena Affolter; 18 June 1950; Amsterdam, Netherlands
- Died: 29 January 2023 (aged 72) Amsterdam, Netherlands
- Genres: Pop; musical theatre
- Occupation: Singer

Hendrika Georziena Affolter (18 June 1950 – 29 January 2023), known as Heddy Lester, was a Dutch singer and actress of Jewish-Surinamese origin, best known outside the Netherlands for her participation in the Eurovision Song Contest 1977.

== Career ==
=== Early career ===
Lester was born in Amsterdam. Her professional career started with Gert Balke as the duo April Shower, who had a minor hit with "Railroad Song" in 1971. Her father ran a restaurant in Amsterdam, where she met singer Ramses Shaffy, with whom she started touring. Lester launched her solo career in 1974.

=== Eurovision Song Contest ===
In 1977, Lester's song "De mallemolen" ("The Merry-Go-Round"), with music written by her brother Frank, was chosen by a celebrity panel as the winner in the Dutch Eurovision selection. Lester went forward to take part in the 22nd Eurovision Song Contest, held in London on 7 May. Although "De mallemolen" had been considered a strong contender prior to the contest, it could only manage a disappointing 12th-place finish of 18 entries.

=== Later career ===
After her Eurovision appearance, Lester worked in a variety of both musical and dramatic stage roles, including works by Lorca (Blood wedding), Euripides (The Trojan Women) and Joshua Sobol (Ghetto).

In 2009, Lester, along with several other former Dutch Eurovision contestants, was a special guest on that year's Eurovision selection television programme.

== Personal life and death ==
Lester died on 29 January 2023, at the age of 72, of bladder cancer.

== Discography ==
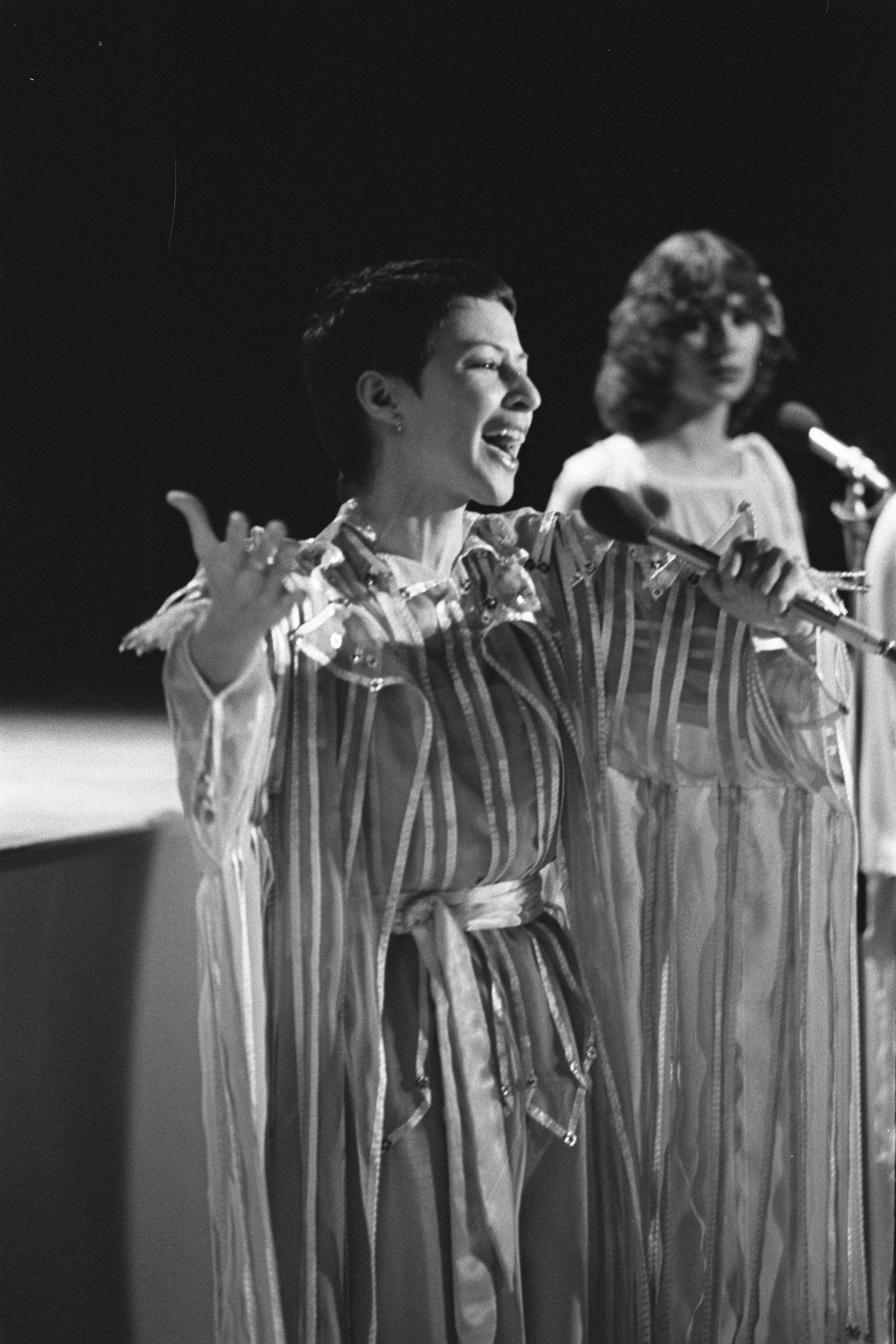
Lester in 1977

=== Singles ===
==== With April Shower ====
- 1971: "Mama Look Upon Me"
- 1971: "Railroad Song" (#30)
- 1972: "It's So Funny"
- 1973: "Danny's Song"

==== As solo artist ====
- 1974: "Friend of Mine"
- 1977: "De mallemolen" (#28)
- 1977: "Words Keep Turning"
- 1978: "Samen"

=== Albums ===
- 1977: Deel van m'n bestaan

Awards and achievements
Preceded by Sandra Reemer with "The Party's Over"	Netherlands in the Eurovision Song Contest; 1977	Succeeded by Harmony with "'t Is OK"
