= Aarno Raninen =

Finnish musician

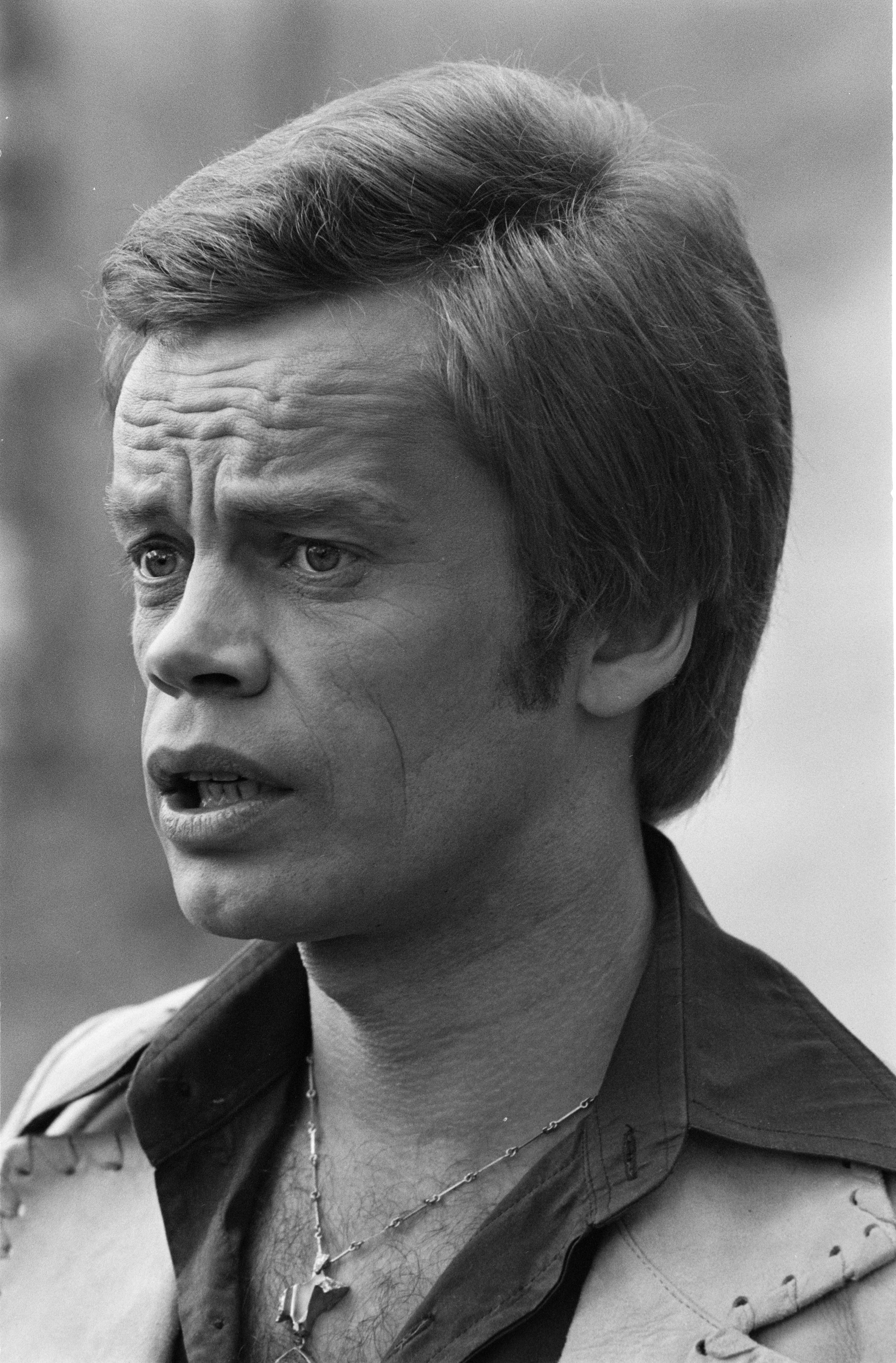
- Born: 27 April 1944
- Died: 3 September 2014 (aged 70)
- Occupation: Musician

Aarno Raninen (27 April 1944 – 3 September 2014) was a Finnish singer, songwriter and musician. His main instrument was piano but he has also mastered violin, cello and accordion.

Born in Kotka, Raninen began his musical studies at a young age. After he moved to Helsinki in 1966 he got a job as a studio conductor at Musiikki-Fazer. While working there he made a lot of cooperative work with the likes of songwriter Juha Vainio. Later on Raninen went to work in Discophon where he wrote lyrics for many Finnish musicians, such as Seija Simola, Carola, Tauno Palo, Vesa-Matti Loiri, Monica Aspelund, Heikki Kinnunen, Arja Koriseva, Erkki Liikanen and the Soitinmenot-ensemble.

An important acquaintance for Raninen has been the songwriter for film and television, Pertti "Pertsa" Reponen. Raninen set the music for at least the following Reponen's TV-series: Älyvapaa palokunta 1983–85, Soitinmenot 1985–87, Kolmannen korvapuusti 1994–95, Paha yskä 1990–92 and Jäitä hattuun. He also set the music for feature films such as Pölhölä, Vääpeli KörmyVääpeli Körmy ja vetenalaiset vehkeet, Auvo ja Kultsi – Kliffaa Hei, Liian iso keikka, Vääpeli Körmy ja marsalkan sauva and Rampe ja Naukkis.

Raninen and his work received several awards over the years, including the win at Syksyn sävel 1968 ("Näin on" performed by Kristian), 10th place at Eurovision in 1977 ("Lapponia" performed by Monica Aspelund) and the main prize at the Menschen und Meer competition in 1978 ("Silver and gold" performed by Monica Aspelund). He died in Tuusula in 2014.
