= Marie Myriam =

French singer of Portuguese descent (born 1957)

- Born: Myriam Lopes; 8 May 1957 (age 69); Luluabourg, Belgian Congo (now Democratic Republic of the Congo)
- Occupation: Singer

Myriam Lopes Elmosnino, professionally known as Marie Myriam (née Lopes; born 8 May 1957, Luluabourg, Belgian Congo, now Democratic Republic of the Congo) is a French singer.

== Career ==
Representing France, she won the Eurovision Song Contest in 1977 with L'oiseau et l'enfant ("The bird and the child") the day before her 20th birthday, with music by Jean Paul Cara. The single reached No. 42 in the UK Singles Chart in June 1977. This achievement made her the first Eurovision winner to be born after the creation of the contest itself.

In 1981, Myriam also represented France in the Yamaha Music Festival with the song "Sentimentale;" she came in ninth place. In recent years, she has read out the votes of the French Jury at the Eurovision Song Contest.

Myriam made an appearance at the 50th anniversary concert in Copenhagen, Denmark, in October 2005 as a guest presenter and performer. The same year, she wrote the introduction to the French edition of The Eurovision Song Contest – The Official History by John Kennedy O'Connor.

== Personal life ==
Myriam was married to music producer Michel Elmosnino from the late 1970s until his death at age 67 on December 20, 2013. The marriage produced two children: Laureen (born 1982), now a master of ceremony, and Rick (born 1990), an assistant director and photographer.

== Discography ==
Marie Myriam discography
- Studio albums: 8
- Compilation albums: 10
- Singles: 32

=== Albums ===
==== Studio albums ====
Title	Album details	Peak chart positions	
Title	Album details	FRA	QUE
Marie Myriam	Released: 1977; Label: Polydor; Formats: LP, MC	18	—
Marie Myriam	Released: 1979; Label: Polydor; Formats: LP, MC	—	—
Marie Myriam sur l'île aux enfants	Released: 1980; Label: Adès; Formats: LP	—	—
Marie Myriam chante Blanche Neige	Released: 1981; Label: Bell; Formats: LP, MC	—	—
Calin caline	Released: 1985; Label: Disc'Az; Formats: LP, MC; Released in Quebec as Marie Myriam	—	37
En plein cœur	Released: April 1988; Label: WEA; Formats: CD, LP, MC	—	—
VII	Released: 1991; Label: 4/4 Musique; Formats: CD, MC; Quebec-only release	—	—
Tous les anges chantent	Released: 17 November 2008; Label: Laureen Music; Formats: CD	—	—
"—" denotes releases that did not chart or were not released in that territory.

==== Compilation albums ====
Title	Album details	Peak chart positions	
Title	Album details	BE (WA)	FRA
Sentimentale	Released: March 1988; Label: Laureen Music; Formats: CD, LP	—	—
Tout simplement	Released: 1992; Label: Mad in France/Laureen Music; Formats:CD, MC	—	—
L'oiseau et l'enfant	Released: 1994; Label: Spectrum Music; Formats: CD	—	—
14 plus grands succès	Released: May 1994; Label: Pomme Music; Formats: CD	—	—
Charmes – Ses plus belles chansons	Released: April 1995; Label: Une Musique; Formats: CD, MC	—	—
Atouts – Ses plus beaux inédits	Released: September 1996; Label: Une Musique; Formats: CD, MC	—	—
Master série	Released: August 1997; Label: Une Musique/PolyGram; Formats: CD	—	—
Encore	Released: 19 November 2007; Label: Laureen Music; Formats: CD	—	—
Référence 80	Released: March 2012; Label: LM Music; Formats: CD	—	—
40 ans de carrière	Release date: 21 April 2017; Label: Wagram Music/Laureen Music; Formats: CD, digital download	84	172
"—" denotes releases that did not chart or were not released in that territory.

=== Singles ===
Name	Year	Peak chart positions										Album
Name	Year	FRA	AUT	BE (FLA)	BE (WA)	GER	NL	QUE	SWE	SWI	UK	Album
"Ma colombe"	1976	—	—	—	—	—	—	2	—	—	—	Non-album single
"L'oiseau et l'enfant"	1977	1	15	6	1	19	23	8	5	2	42	Marie Myriam (1977)
"La leçon de Prévert"	1977	12	—	—	—	—	—	—	—	—	—	Marie Myriam (1977)
"Aime" (Germany-only release)	1977	—	—	—	—	—	—	—	—	—	—	Marie Myriam (1977)
"Toutes les chansons du monde"	1977	—	—	—	—	—	—	5	—	—	—	Marie Myriam (1977)
"L'amour c'est comme la mer" (Canada and Portugal-only release)	1978	—	—	—	—	—	—	21	—	—	—	Marie Myriam (1977)
"Loin, loin"	1978	—	—	—	—	—	—	—	—	—	—	Non-album single
"Un homme libre"	1979	40	—	—	—	—	—	18	—	—	—	Marie Myriam (1979)
"Toujours partir" (b/w "Le cœur somnambule")	1979	60	—	—	—	—	—	— 11	—	—	—	Marie Myriam (1979)
"Casimir, mon ami"	1979	—	—	—	—	—	—	—	—	—	—	Marie Myriam sur l'île aux enfants
"Los olvidados"	1980	—	—	—	—	—	—	15	—	—	—	Non-album singles
"Noël"	1980	—	—	—	—	—	—	—	—	—	—	Non-album singles
"Les visiteurs de Noël"	1980	—	—	—	—	—	—	—	—	—	—	Marie Myriam sur l'île aux enfants
"J'aime quand tu es jaloux"	1981	—	—	—	—	—	—	—	—	—	—	Non-album single
"Un sourire en chantant"	1981	—	—	—	—	—	—	—	—	—	—	Marie Myriam chante Blanche Neige
"Sentimentale"	1982	64	—	—	—	—	—	6	—	—	—	Non-album singles
"Alors"	1983	—	—	—	—	—	—	24	—	—	—	Non-album singles
"Candy grandit"	1983	—	—	—	—	—	—	—	—	—	—	Non-album singles
"La chanson de Nils Holgersson"	1983	—	—	—	—	—	—	—	—	—	—	Non-album singles
"Sur ma planète"	1984	—	—	—	—	—	—	—	—	—	—	Non-album singles
"Nostalgia"	1984	—	—	—	—	—	—	2	—	—	—	Calin caline
"C'est calin caline"	1985	—	—	—	—	—	—	11	—	—	—	Calin caline
"Qu’est-ce que t'as qui va pas ?"	1985	—	—	—	—	—	—	37	—	—	—	Calin caline
"Tout est pardonné"	1987	6	—	—	—	—	—	6	—	—	—	En plein cœur
"Dis-moi les silences"	1988	43	—	—	—	—	—	39	—	—	—	En plein cœur
"En plein cœur"	1988	—	—	—	—	—	—	29	—	—	—	En plein cœur
"Celui qui s'en va" (Canada-only release)	1988	—	—	—	—	—	—	45	—	—	—	En plein cœur
"La solitude des rois"	1989	—	—	—	—	—	—	—	—	—	—	Non-album single
"T'en va pas" (Canada-only release)	1991	—	—	—	—	—	—	14	—	—	—	VII
"P'tit homme"	1992	—	—	—	—	—	—	—	—	—	—	VII
"Un homme libre"	1993	—	—	—	—	—	—	—	—	—	—	Tout simplement
"L'oiseau et l'enfant" (version 2002)	2002	71	—	—	—	—	—	—	—	—	—	Non-album single
"—" denotes releases that did not chart or were not released in that territory.

Awards
Preceded by (United Kingdom) Brotherhood of Man with "Save Your Kisses for Me"	Winner of the Eurovision Song Contest; 1977	Succeeded by (Israel) Izhar Cohen & the Alphabeta with "A-Ba-Ni-Bi"
Preceded by Catherine Ferry with "Un, deux, trois"	France in the Eurovision Song Contest; 1977	Succeeded by Joël Prévost with "Il y aura toujours des violons"
