= Netherlands in the Eurovision Song Contest 1977 =

- Eurovision Song Contest 1977
- Participating broadcaster: Nederlandse Omroep Stichting (NOS)
- Country: Netherlands
- Selection process: Nationaal Songfestival 1977
- Selection date: 2 February 1977

Competing entry
- Song: "De mallemolen"
- Artist: Heddy Lester
- Songwriters: Frank Affolter; Wim Hogenkamp

Placement
- Final result: 12th, 35 points

Participation chronology

The Netherlands was represented at the Eurovision Song Contest 1977 with the song "De mallemolen", composed by Frank Affolter, with lyrics by Wim Hogenkamp, and performed by Heddy Lester. The Dutch participating broadcaster, Nederlandse Omroep Stichting (NOS), selected its entry through a national final.

== Before Eurovision ==
=== Nationaal Songfestival 1977 ===
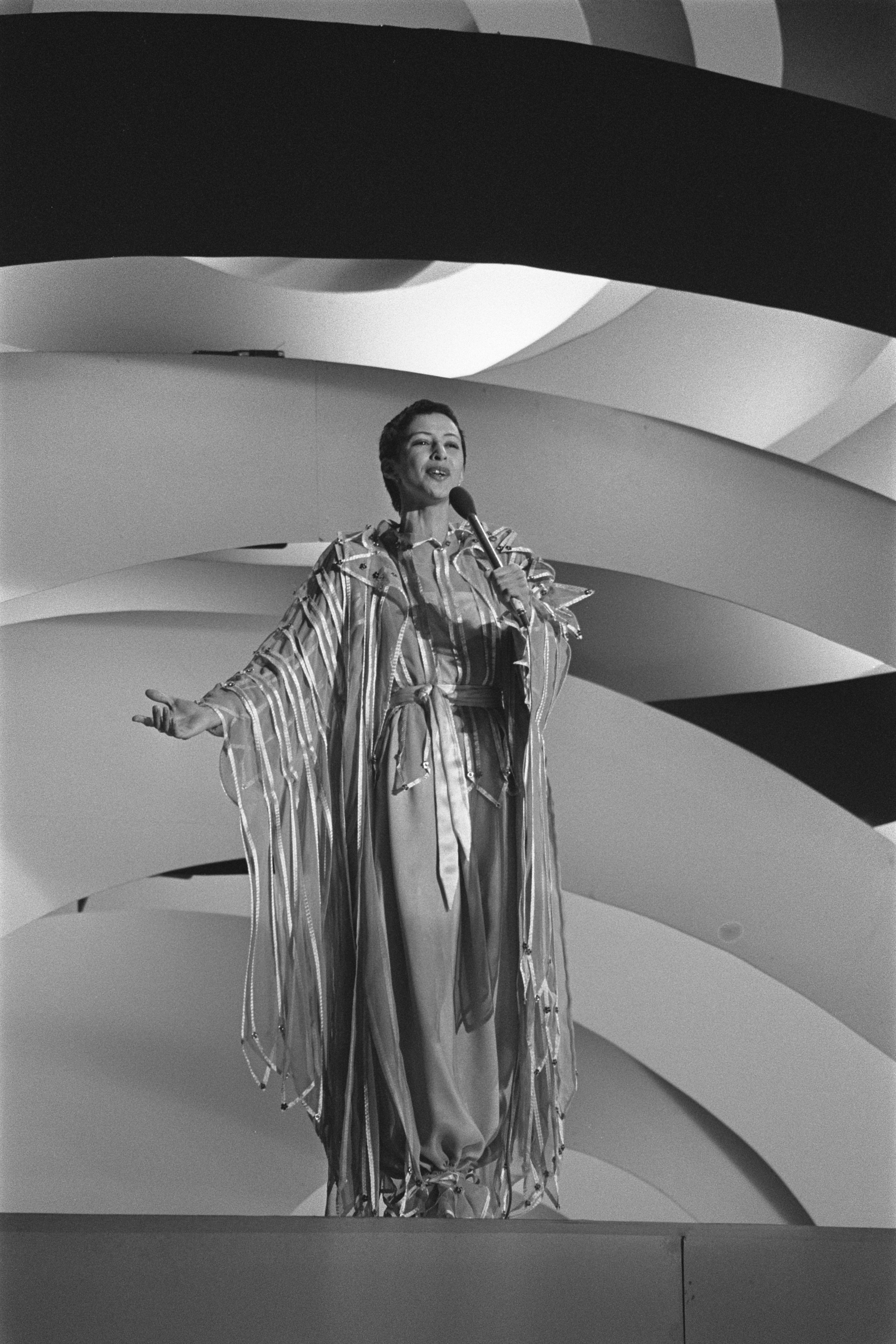
National winner Heddy Lester

The final was held at the Congresgebouw in The Hague, hosted by Ati Dijckmeester. Ten songs took part and voting was by eleven "celebrity" juries of nine people based in each Dutch province. Each juror awarded one point to his/her favourite song, with 99 points available in total. "De mallemolen" emerged the winner by a 5-point margin.

Final – 2 February 1977
| R/O | Artist | Song | Points | Place |
|---|---|---|---|---|
| 1 | Oscar Harris | "Superster" | 5 | 6 |
| 2 | Heddy Lester | "De mallemolen" | 28 | 1 |
| 3 | Arjan Brass | "Annabelle" | 4 | 9 |
| 4 | Bonnie St. Claire | "Stop Me" | 23 | 2 |
| 5 | Rita Hovink | "Toen kwam jij" | 2 | 10 |
| 6 | Air Bubble | "Jany" | 5 | 6 |
| 7 | Peter Cook | "Pinokkio" | 8 | 4 |
| 8 | Loeki Knol | "Ik wil de wereld laten zien dat ik kan dansen" | 5 | 6 |
| 9 | Dick Rienstra | "Jouw lach" | 6 | 5 |
| 10 | Maggie MacNeal | "Jij alleen" | 13 | 3 |

== At Eurovision ==
On the night of the final Lester performed 3rd in the running order, following Monaco and preceding Austria. "De mallemolen" had been one of the front-runners in pre-contest betting, but at the close of voting had managed to muster only 35 points, placing the Netherlands 12th of the 18 entries. The Dutch jury awarded its 12 points to Belgium.

The Dutch conductor at the contest was Harry van Hoof.

Because the normal jury made up of members of the public did not show up on the day of the final for unknown reasons, a jury made up of music and entertainment professionals was brought in at the last minute. These people were Martine Bijl, Tony Nolte, Mieke Telkamp, Eddy Becker, Leo Janssen, Hans Vermeulen, Rien van Wijk, Caroline van Hemert, and Hans van Hemert.

=== Voting ===
Points awarded to the Netherlands
| Score | Country |
|---|---|
| 12 points | |
| 10 points | Belgium |
| 8 points | France |
| 7 points | Switzerland |
| 6 points | |
| 5 points | |
| 4 points | |
| 3 points | Ireland; Monaco |
| 2 points | |
| 1 point | Greece; Israel; Spain; United Kingdom |

Points awarded by the Netherlands
| Score | Country |
|---|---|
| 12 points | Belgium |
| 10 points | Greece |
| 8 points | France |
| 7 points | United Kingdom |
| 6 points | Spain |
| 5 points | Israel |
| 4 points | Finland |
| 3 points | Germany |
| 2 points | Portugal |
| 1 point | Ireland |
