= Sweden in the Eurovision Song Contest 1977 =

- Eurovision Song Contest 1977
- Participating broadcaster: Sveriges Radio (SR)
- Country: Sweden
- Selection process: Melodifestivalen 1977
- Selection date: 26 February 1977

Competing entry
- Song: "Beatles"
- Artist: Forbes
- Songwriters: Claes Bure; Sven-Olof Bagge

Placement
- Final result: 18th, 2 points

Participation chronology

Sweden was represented at the Eurovision Song Contest 1977 with the song "Beatles", composed by Claes Bure, with lyrics by Sven-Olof Bagge, and performed by the band Forbes. The Swedish participating broadcaster, Sveriges Radio (SR), selected its entry through Melodifestivalen 1977. The entry was a tribute to the rock band The Beatles, who had split up some years earlier.

== Before Eurovision ==
=== Melodifestivalen 1977 ===
Melodifestivalen 1977 was the selection for the 17th song to represent Sweden at the Eurovision Song Contest. After hosting the contest in 1975, Sweden chose to skip the following year to save money, and the program also faced criticism from the political left. It was the 16th time that this system of picking a song had been used. 965 songs were submitted to SR for the competition. The final was held in the Cirkus in Stockholm on 26 February 1977, presented by Ulf Elfving and was broadcast on TV1 but was not broadcast on radio.

Three of the ten competing songs were written by Tomas Ledin.

R/O	Artist	Song	Songwriters	Points	Place
1	Lena Andersson	"Det bästa som finns"	Ted Gärdestad; Kenneth Gärdestad	55	8
2	Greta & Malou	"Åh, vilken sång"	Greta Zachrisson; Malou Berg	72	4
3	Mats Rådberg	"Du och jag och sommaren"	Tomas Ledin	19	10
4	Landslaget	"Sommaren -65"	Lasse Lindbom	73	3
5	Kenneth Greuz & Eric Öst	"Ola mä fiola"	Little Gerhard	47	9
6	Tomas Ledin	"Minns du Hollywood?"	Tomas Ledin	63	5
7	Svante Thuresson	"Johan B. Lund"	Åke Larsén; Per-Arne Eklund	75	2
8	Janne Landegren	"Trädets rot"	Jan Sjunneson	60	6
9	Eva Rydberg	"Charlie Chaplin"	Tomas Ledin	57	7
10	Forbes	"Beatles"	Sven-Olof Bagge; Claes Bure	117	1

==== Voting ====
R/O	Song	Luleå	Falun	Karlstad	Gothenburg	Umeå	Örebro	Norrköping	Malmö	Sundsvall	Växjö	Stockholm	Total
1	"Det bästa som finns"	2	1	8	8	8	2	3	7	3	10	3	55
2	"Åh, vilken sång"	5	4	5	7	6	10	10	6	10	2	7	72
3	"Du och jag och sommaren"	1	2	2	2	2	4	1	1	2	1	1	19
4	"Sommaren -65"	7	3	7	3	4	8	6	12	8	5	10	73
5	"Ola mä fiola"	3	10	4	1	5	6	4	4	1	7	2	47
6	"Hollywood"	4	6	12	12	1	5	7	3	4	3	6	63
7	"Johan B. Lund"	8	12	1	10	3	7	8	8	6	8	4	75
8	"Trädets rot"	10	5	6	4	10	1	5	2	5	4	8	60
9	"Charlie Chaplin"	6	8	3	5	7	3	2	5	7	6	5	57
10	"Beatles"	12	7	10	6	12	12	12	10	12	12	12	117

== At Eurovision ==
The contest was held in London, and Forbes performed 12th. Sweden received 2 points from Germany and nothing else, giving them their first last place since 1963.

=== Voting ===
Points awarded to Sweden
Score	Country
12 points	
10 points	
8 points	
7 points	
6 points	
5 points	
4 points	
3 points	
2 points	Germany
1 point	

Points awarded by Sweden
Score	Country
12 points	Ireland
10 points	Monaco
8 points	United Kingdom
7 points	Greece
6 points	France
5 points	Germany
4 points	Belgium
3 points	Israel
2 points	Finland
1 point	Norway
