= Wembley Conference Centre =

Former conference centre in Wembley Park, London, England (1977–2006)

- Interactive map of Wembley Conference Centre
- Location: Empire Way, Wembley, England
- Coordinates: 51.5572°N 0.2847°W
- Capacity: 2,500

Construction
- Groundbreaking: May 1973
- Opened: 31 January 1977
- Closed: 2006
- Demolished: September 2006
- Architect: R. Seifert and Partners

Tenant
- Benson & Hedges Masters (1979–2006)

Wembley Conference Centre was a conference centre in Wembley Park, London, England, that existed from 1977 to 2006, located next to Wembley Arena.

== History ==
In the later 1970s, modern multi-purpose halls began opening in British towns and cities. The first was Wembley Conference Centre on Empire Way in Wembley Park, designed for the British Electric Traction Company by R. Seifert and Partners. Construction began in May 1973 and it was officially opened by the Duke of Kent on 31 January 1977. Its main auditorium (named the Grand Hall) could seat 2,500 people.

The Conference Centre was part of a larger development. Next to it were the 7,770 square feet (722 m^{2}) Greenwich Rooms and Elvin House, a futuristic triangular office block, as well as the Wembley Exhibition Centre. Like the Conference Centre, the Exhibition Centre was part of a national trend for such venues.

The addition of the Conference Centre and exhibition hall to the list of visitor attractions at Wembley Park led to Wembley Hill station being renamed Wembley Complex in May 1978. It retained this name until May 1987, when it was again renamed—this time as Wembley Stadium.

In preparation for a major redevelopment of both Wembley Stadium and the area immediately surrounding it, the conference centre building was demolished in September 2006. A mixed-use development named Quadrant Court was built in its place.

== Events ==
An early event was the January 1977 Model Engineer Exhibition, which had previously been held at the Seymour Hall in Marylebone. On 7 May 1977 the centre was the venue for the 1977 Eurovision Song Contest, in which the United Kingdom came second. On 18 October 1977 it hosted the first ever Brit Awards ceremony (then called the 1977 BPI awards).

The centre was used for numerous conferences, trade events, exhibitions, corporate hospitality, annual general meetings, university graduation ceremonies, banquets, indoor sport, popular music, and dance competitions. It hosted the World Cup Disco Dance Championships in May 1987, won by Jeanette Doughty (Len Goodman Dance Centre), as reported in Dance News.

A classical music concert by the National Youth Orchestra suggested that the centre's acoustics were at best mediocre; in addition to which it was difficult for classical music to attract large enough audiences to fill the Grand Hall.

Between 1979 and 2006, the centre hosted the Benson & Hedges Masters snooker tournament. Other sports held there included boxing, wrestling, bodybuilding and darts.

On 30 August 1995, the Centre hosted the first ever National Television Awards, presented by Eamonn Holmes.

On 7 November 1999, it hosted the darts match between the reigning PDC World Champion Phil Taylor and the reigning BDO World Champion Raymond van Barneveld, with a 60-minute clock ticking down to zero and with the players taking a short break around the half-way stage. The match was broadcast on ITV. Taylor won the match 21–10 in legs.

It hosted three Ricky Hatton boxing matches in which he was victorious. On 21 October 2000, he defeated fellow Briton Jon Thaxton by unanimous decision. On 26 March 2001, he defeated Canadian Tony Pep by a fourth-round TKO two-and-a-half minutes in. On 15 December 2001, he defeated Australian Justin Rowsell by a second-round TKO with thirty-six seconds to go.

During Live Aid on 13 July 1985, the conference centre and exhibition halls were used to provide dressing rooms for the performers.

Between 10 July 2004 and 22 April 2006, it hosted ten Cage Rage mixed martial arts events.

Cage Rage event	Date
Cage Rage 7	10 July 2004
Cage Rage 8	11 September 2004
Cage Rage 9	27 November 2004
Cage Rage 10	26 February 2005
Cage Rage 11	30 April 2005
Cage Rage 12	2 July 2005
Cage Rage 13	10 September 2005
Cage Rage 14	3 December 2005
Cage Rage 15	4 February 2006
Cage Rage 16	22 April 2006

== In popular culture ==
In 1979 the Conference Centre was considered sufficiently futuristic to stand in for a conference centre on the colonised planet Atlay in the BBC science fiction series Blake's 7, in an episode titled "Voice from the Past".

The entrance to the conference centre was also used in Superman IV: The Quest for Peace.

The climax of The Professionals episode "The Madness of Mickey Hamilton" takes place inside the conference centre.

Preceded by Congresgebouw; The Hague	Eurovision Song Contest; Venue; 1977	Succeeded by Palais des Congrès; Paris
